= 250th Rifle Division =

250th Rifle Division (June 26, 1941 - July 1946)
- Active: 1941–1946
- Country: Soviet Union
- Branch: Red Army
- Type: Infantry
- Size: Division
- Engagements: Battle of Smolensk (1941); Battle of Moscow; Demyansk Pocket; Battle of Demyansk (1943); Operation Kutuzov; Battle of Smolensk (1943); Gomel-Rechitsa offensive Rahachow-Zhlobin offensive Operation Bagration; Bobruysk offensive Belostok offensive Vistula-Oder Offensive; East Prussian offensive Heiligenbeil Pocket; Battle of Berlin; Battle of Halbe
- Decorations: Order of the Red Banner; Order of Suvorov
- Battle honours: Bobruysk

Commanders
- Notable commanders: Maj. Gen. Ivan Sergeevich Gorbachyov; Maj. Gen. Pavel Afinogenovich Stepanenko; Col. Vladimir Yosifovich Mizitskii; Maj. Gen. Ivan Vasilevich Mokhin; Maj. Gen. Makhmud-Abdul-Rza Abilov

The 250th Rifle Division was the sixth of a group of 10 regular rifle divisions formed from cadres of NKVD border and internal troops as standard Red Army rifle divisions, very shortly after the German invasion, in the Moscow Military District. It was largely based on what would become the shtat (table of organization and equipment) of July 29, 1941, with several variations. It served under command of 30th Army in an effort to recover Smolensk in late July and in the Dukhovshchina offensives in August and September, and was quickly reduced to a much-weakened state. It was largely encircled in the initial stages of Operation Typhoon but sufficient men and equipment escaped that it was spared being disbanded and, in fact, it was partly rebuilt by incorporating remnants of other disbanded divisions. In October it played a relatively minor role in the defensive operations around Kalinin as part of 22nd Army in Kalinin Front. Early in 1942 the 250th was transferred to the 53rd Army of Northwestern Front, and spent most of the year rebuilding while also containing the German forces in the Demyansk Pocket. After this position was evacuated at the end of February, 1943 the division was transferred to the Reserve of the Supreme High Command and shipped south, joining the 2nd Reserve Army in Steppe Military District. This soon became the 63rd Army in Bryansk Front and the 250th was assigned to the 35th Rifle Corps, where it remained for the duration of the war. During the summer offensive against the German-held salient around Oryol the division helped lead the drive to liberate that city in August, and then advanced through western Russia and into Belarus, now in Central Front (later Belorussian and 1st Belorussian Front). In the initial phase of Operation Bagration the division, now in 3rd Army, was given special recognition for its role in the liberation of the city of Babruysk, and shortly thereafter also received the Order of the Red Banner and the Order of Suvorov. During 1945 it moved, with its Corps and Army, from 2nd Belorussian to 3rd Belorussian Front before returning to 1st Belorussian, seeing combat in Poland, East Prussia and central Germany; its subunits were awarded additional honors and decorations during this period. The 250th had a distinguished career as a combat unit, ending its combat path along the Elbe River. It was disbanded in Belarus in July 1946.

== Formation ==
The 250th Rifle Division began forming within days of the start of the German invasion on June 26, 1941, at Vladimir, in the Moscow Military District. This was based on an NKVD order of that date:

In accordance with a decision of the USSR's government, the NKVD of the USSR is charged with forming fifteen rifle divisions [10 regular and 5 mountain].
1. Lieutenant General I. I. Maslennikov is entrusted with the task of forming fifteen rifle divisions of NKVD forces...
3. Begin forming and deploying the [following] divisions immediately: 243rd Rifle Division, 244th Rifle Division, 246th Rifle Division, 247th Rifle Division, 249th Rifle Division, 250th Rifle Division, 251st Rifle Division, 252nd Rifle Division, 254th Rifle Division, 256th Rifle Division...
4. To form the divisions designated above, assign 1,000 soldiers and non-commissioned officers and 500 command cadre from the NKVD's cadre to each division. Request the Red Army General Staff to provide the remainder of personnel by calling up all categories of soldiers from the reserves.
5. Complete concentrating the NKVD cadre at the formation regions by 17 July 1941...

Although the initial order for its formation came from the NKVD, when it left for the front in early July it was completely under Red Army administration. Its order of battle, which changed considerably over time, was as follows:

- 918th Rifle Regiment
- 922nd Rifle Regiment
- 926th Rifle Regiment
- 916th Rifle Regiment (from 1st Formation of the 247th Rifle Division)
- 790th Artillery Regiment
- 308th Antitank Battalion
- 247th Antiaircraft Battery (later 527th Antiaircraft Battalion, until March 17, 1943)
- 439th Mortar Battalion (from November 1, 1941 to November 10, 1942)
- 329th Reconnaissance Company
- 418th Sapper Battalion
- 670th Signal Battalion (later 670th, 384th Signal Companies)
- 268th Medical/Sanitation Battalion (later 258th)
- 248th Chemical Defense (Anti-gas) Company
- 471st Motor Transport Company (later 311th Auto Transport Battalion)
- 286th Field Bakery (later 387th Motorized Field Bakery)
- 299th Divisional Veterinary Hospital
- 813th Field Postal Station
- 714th Field Office of the State Bank (later 416th)

Maj. Gen. Ivan Sergeevich Gorbachyov, an NKVD officer, was appointed to command on July 7. It is likely that some portion of the division's cadre came from the 54th Nerchinskozavodsk Border Detachment in the Trans-Baikal region which he had led since 1938. The division was first assigned to 30th Army in the Group of STAVKA Reserve Armies, joining the 242nd and 251st Rifle Divisions. On July 21 the commander of 30th Army, Maj. Gen. V. A. Khomenko, ordered each of his rifle divisions to receive a tank battalion from the 110th Tank Division. These battalions were supposed to consist of two companies, one of 10 T-34s and one of 10 BT or T-26 light tanks, plus a BT or T-26 as a headquarters tank.

The division was far from complete when it entered combat. Khomenko reported on August 5 regarding his 250th and 251st Divisions that they had been required to move up to 350 km on foot to their concentration areas and "were taken from their assembly points in the very midst of assembly, and, incomplete, they did not approach being 'knocked together' and went into battle unprepared for combat." The two divisions had no howitzers at all, severe shortages existed in field guns and mortars, and ammunition of all types was short. In addition, the 251st had only about 400 NKVD cadre soldiers. He went on to note:

1. 30th Army received its combat mission while it was forming and assembling. Because the army was formed from poorly-trained reservists, the army's combat capabilities when it received its combat mission were not at the proper level as was confirmed by the outcome of combat operations.
2. The provisioning of the army with weapons and combat equipment was unsatisfactory...
3. Providing the army with all that was suitable and necessary by higher level supply organs occurred very slowly, partially, and was of insufficient quality.

Glantz comments that "These candid reports about the combat state of 30th Army will largely explain why 30th Army operates as it does during the Western Front's three counteroffensives during late July, August, and early September 1941. Given these facts, the army's performance was nothing short of amazing."

=== Battle of Smolensk ===
The 250th officially joined the active army on July 18, just over three weeks after beginning to form up. Three days earlier, the lead elements of 2nd Panzer Group's 29th Motorized Division had reached the southern part of Smolensk. Over the following days German pressure mounted against the three armies of Western Front, commanded by Marshal S. K. Timoshenko, which were almost entirely encircled in that region. On July 19 the commander of the Group of STAVKA Reserve Armies, Lt. Gen. I. A. Bogdanov, was alerted by the STAVKA to begin preparing an offensive operation with his 29th, 30th and 28th Armies to rescue Timoshenko's force. The 30th, starting from its concentration area north of the Western Dvina River, was to advance toward Demidov.

The following day, on behalf of the STAVKA, Army Gen. G. K. Zhukov sent a directive to Timoshenko, who was now acting as commander of the Western Direction. Four reserve armies, including the 30th (now designated as "Group Khomenko"), were to launch attacks toward Dukhovshchina and Smolensk along converging axes. Khomenko was to attack southward from the region southwest of Bely to reach the Maksimovka–Petropole line by the end of July 22 before pushing on toward Dukhovshchina the next morning. A report from 0600 hours on July 23 indicated that the 250th had reached the Belyi line. A further report two days later stated that the Army was engaged in fighting with German motorized infantry 2 km north of Chernyi Ruchei, and that the division had captured Okolitsa, 20 km southwest of Bely, and was now attacking toward Chernyi Ruchei against a battalion of 20th Motorized Division reinforced with an artillery battery and 25-30 mortars.

During this fighting the commander of the 922nd Rifle Regiment, Maj. Dmitri Ignatievich Kuznetsov, distinguished himself. The regiment was defending a section of the Dukhovshchina–Bely road near the villages of Okolitsa and Chernyi Ruchei from hastily-dug trenches under German artillery and air bombardment. Kuznetsov directed his soldiers to repel several German attacks from his command post, despite being wounded in the arm. When the fighting reached its climax he led a counterattack which threw the German forces back, but suffered a more serious wound in the process. He died in a field hospital on July 28. Kuznetsov was posthumously made a Hero of the Soviet Union on August 31, and after the war a street in Demidov was named in his honor.

In orders issued by Timoshenko at 0240 hours on July 26 the division was to destroy the German forces remaining in the Okolitsa area and capture the Sutoki region, 12 km south of that place. During that day and the next 30th Army recorded some tactical successes in advances of 5–15 km against the dug-in company-size battlegroups of 18th Motorized Division, but General Gorbachyov died of wounds sustained in combat. He would be replaced on August 1 by Col. Pavel Afinogenovich Stepanenko. This officer had previously served as chief of staff of 52nd Rifle Corps and would be promoted to the rank of major general on May 21, 1942. By July 31 it was clear that the offensive to recover Smolensk and rescue the three nearly encircled armies had failed, but had also forced Army Group Center's two panzer groups to a near standstill.

In the course of this fighting, by August 1 the three rifle regiments were reduced to the following strengths:

- 918th: 727 men
- 922nd: 1,195 men
- 926th: 526 men

After about two weeks of combat, the division had lost about half its strength. As well, by August 5 the tank battalion was down to eight T-34s, one T-26, two BT-7s and six BT-5s. The same day, Army Group Center began its final effort to seal off the Smolensk pocket and liquidate the forces within it. In a report issued by Timoshenko at 2000 hours on August 3 it was reported that 30th Army had attacked with its main forces in the morning, overcoming strong German resistance, while the 250th was defending along the Losmino–Dvorishche–Okolitsa line against 19th Panzer Division's 73rd and 74th Panzergrenadier Regiments.

=== Dukhovshchina Offensives ===
As of August 8 the divisions of XXXIX Motorized Corps which had been facing 30th Army had been relieved by the infantry divisions of 9th Army's V Army Corps. These divisions were very hard pressed to parry the attacks of Khomenko's forces and Lt. Gen. I. S. Konev's 19th Army east and northeast of Dukhovshchina. In the wake of these assaults the commander of Army Group Center noted "9th Army was also attacked; the day before yesterday the Russians broke through as far as the 5th Division's artillery positions." The chief of staff of OKH, Col. Gen. F. Halder, noted on August 11 in regard to these attacks:

The whole situation makes it increasingly plain that we have underestimated the Russian colossus, who consistently prepared for war with that utterly ruthless determination so characteristic of totalitarian states... At the outset of war, we reckoned with about 200 enemy divisions. Now we have already counted 360. These divisions indeed are not armed and equipped according to our standards, and their tactical leadership is often poor. But they are there, and if we smash a dozen of them, the Russians simply put up another dozen.

Timoshenko began planning for a renewed effort on August 14 which was intended to recapture Dukhovshchina en route to Smolensk. The STAVKA ordered this to be coordinated with Zhukov's Reserve Front on August 17 in order to engulf the entire front from Toropets in the north to Bryansk in the south. In the event, due to the chaotic situation, Timoshenko was forced to conduct the operation in piecemeal fashion and was unable to establish close cooperation with Zhukov.

The operational directive set the goal of encircling and destroying the German 106th, 5th, and 28th Infantry Divisions and 900th Lehr Regiment through concentric attacks with two shock groups, the northern consisting of the 30th Army's 242nd, 251st and 162nd Rifle Divisions, 107th Tank and 45th Cavalry Divisions. The Army was to protect its right flank toward Bely with the 250th Division, penetrate the German defense and then commit the mobile forces to encircle the objective from the west. The 250th, which had the support of the 2nd Battalion of the 542nd Cannon Artillery Regiment, was to hold its present positions, prevent any penetration toward Bely, and prepare to attack in the general direction of Dubovitsa. Its sector was 15 km wide and it faced the bulk of the 129th Infantry Division. The shock group went over to the offensive on August 17, but apart from the 107th Tanks and one regiment of the 162nd which penetrated up to 4 km, the remainder stalled against heavy resistance. A renewed effort the next day was similarly unsuccessful, although the 926th Rifle Regiment concentrated near Pozhimki at noon in preparation for joining the attack.

Army Group Center began a counterstroke on August 20, striking the right flank of 19th Army to the south of 30th Army. Meanwhile, 30th Army maintained its offensive pressure as best it could. The next day Timoshenko decided that, since it appeared that 30th Army's attacks were going nowhere, it would be more useful to transfer its fresh forces to 19th Army's sector; on August 22 he permitted Khomenko to take a day to rest and refit. The next day 30th Army recorded some minor gains, with the 242nd pushing toward Erkhovo and Marker 215.2 in cooperation with the 250th and 107th Tank Divisions. The 250th captured Hill 220.0 and was ordered to develop the success during the night. However, by the end of the day word had reached Timoshenko that 22nd Army, which was supposed to be advancing south of Velikiye Luki, was in fact facing defeat from the forces of 3rd Panzer Group moving northward.

Despite this impending crisis, Stalin, the STAVKA, and Timoshenko remained confident that their armies could collapse Army Group Center's defenses east of Smolensk, and so persisted in their offensive preparations. On August 25 Timoshenko directed Khomenko to continue protecting the Bely axis with at least two regiments of the 250th while preparing to continue the offensive with most of the rest of his forces. At 0145 hours Khomenko dispatched a warning order to his subordinates which included:

250th RD (less 922nd RR) - capture Hill 215.2 and subsequently attack toward Hill 229.6.
250th RD's 918th RR - after being relieved by 134th RD, concentrate in the Zhidki region by 0500 hours on 27 August in readiness to operate with the division's main forces.

Near the end of the day it was reported that the 926th Regiment was fighting to capture Hill 215.2. This was part of a combined attack by the Army's five divisions on a 7 km-wide sector against 106th Infantry Division which gained up to 2.5 km and forced the German division back to its second defensive line. The assault resumed just past noon of the following day, including the "complete" 250th. It was reported as having attacked toward Churkino, completed the conquest of Hill 215.2, and was fighting 500m west of the hill at 1500 hours. Altogether, 30th Army forced the right wing of the damaged 106th Infantry to bend but not break, but at the cost to itself of 182 men killed and wounded. As of 1700 on August 27 the 918th Regiment, in cooperation with the 629th Rifle Regiment of the 134th Division, was moving toward the southwest, with the heads of the columns crossing the Zaozere and Chernyi Ruchei line. A further effort by the division on August 28 reached the northern slopes of Hill 229.6, followed by an attempt to capture it.

==== Second Offensive ====
Timoshenko, determined to carry out his design and press the advantages he had won, issued orders to Western Front to prepare to resume the offensive on September 1 after regrouping. 30th Army was directed to make its main attack toward Demidov, with the objective of reaching that place as well as Velizh by the end of September 8. As part of the regrouping Khomenko ordered the 134th Division to relieve the 242nd's units along the Demekhi and Novoe Morokhovo line while the division in turn relieved the 250th's units in the Hill 215.2 and Shelepy sector, prior to attacking to capture Churkino, Kostino, and Hill 229.6. After an artillery preparation, four armies of the Front went back to the general offensive between 0700 and 0900 hours. 30th Army had the 242nd, 162nd and 251st Rifle and 107th Tank Divisions in first echelon, with the 250th in reserve, facing the German 106th and 35th Divisions. During the day the division was putting itself in order and conducting combat training. On September 2 the 918th Regiment encountered strong resistance along a line 10 km south-southwest of Chernyi Ruchei. The following day the 922nd Regiment was occupying defenses in the Bor and Okolitsa region, the 918th Regiment was conducting a firefight for Kiriakino and Lake Sutoki, and the 926th Regiment was acting as General Khomenko's reserve. At 0230 on September 5 Western Front issued specific missions, including:

250th RD - drive the enemy back from the Sutoki region, capture the Savostino, Vorontsovo, and Nivy region [18-19km south-southwest of Chernyi Ruchei] with part of your forces, and dig in.

This effort was unsuccessful. Finally, at 0335 on September 10 the STAVKA ordered Western Front to go over to the defense. The next day the division, along with two battalions of the 118th Artillery Regiment, was ordered to occupy and firmly defend the Chichata, Ostroluki, Malinovka, Koshelevo, Sutoki and Zyki front along the Rzhat River, prepare a rear defensive line and an antitank region in the Chernyi Ruchei region to prevent a German penetration toward that place or to Bely, and several other detailed measures.

== Operation Typhoon ==
The front west of Moscow was generally quiet through the balance of September as Army Groups Center and South focused on the encirclement and destruction of Southwestern Front east of Kyiv. By the end of the month 30th Army was defending a 66 km-wide sector with four divisions; 19th Army remained on its left (south) flank. General Khomenko correctly determined, due to the terrain, that the Kaniutino axis was likely where the main German attack would come. At the expense of a critical weakening of the Army's other sectors the 162nd Division was moved from reserve to deploy on this flank in two echelons on a frontage of only 6.5 km, with one regiment of the 242nd Division also in the first echelon. In addition to being badly overstretched, the Army was experiencing an acute shortage of artillery, rifles, and engineering assets. Although the STAVKA believed the main German attack would come along the Smolensk–Vyazma highway, in fact it would be aimed at the 19th/30th Army boundary.

Khomenko decided to fire a preemptive artillery bombardment between 1100 and 1130 hours on October 1 in an effort to disrupt the German forces which, by then, were clearly massing against his left flank. While Khomenko's headquarters claimed significant damage had been inflicted, a good deal of the Army's available ammunition was also expended. Operation Typhoon began at 0530 hours on October 2, and the Army boundary was struck by 3rd Panzer Group and 9th Army as Khomenko expected. As early as 1330 he reported to Western Front:

The enemy with up to two infantry divisions supported by tanks and up to 120 aircraft penetrated the front of the 162nd and 242nd Rifle Divisions. By 1130 they had reached the line Krapivnia-Aklimovo-River Osotnia.
The 242nd Rifle Division's 897th Rifle Regiment and the 162nd Rifle Division's 501st Rifle Regiment are fighting in encirclement.
... On the sector of 250th Rifle Division, small groups of the enemy have infiltrated to Zazer'e, and in the area of Murav'evo there are an unestablished number of tanks.

While the overall attack front was up to 45 km wide the main breakthrough sector was only 16 km wide. Overall, the Kaniutino axis was attacked by four German corps consisting of 12 divisions, including three panzer divisions (460-470 tanks) and one motorized division, simultaneously. Shortly after, the 9th Army's VI Army Corps began pushing toward Bely.

Khomenko attempted to counterattack the next day to restore the front, but under the prevailing circumstances this effort failed. By order of Western Front on October 4 the 29th Army's 29th Motorized Rifle Brigade and 53rd Cavalry Division were shifted to occupy a prepared defensive line in front of Bely. Despite its name the 29th Brigade had no motor vehicles, so it travelled primarily by rail, then on foot, losing up to 50 men killed and wounded by air attacks. When it arrived at the city it found German forces already holding the city's southern portion. Meanwhile the 250th had set out on foot for the Bely axis, but never managed to reach it. In the course of October 4 the German Air Force struck the division's units three times, as well as the 53rd Cavalry and the city itself. Up to 170 German aircraft took part in the attacks in groups of 40 - 80 bombers and fighters. The division's units were scattered and failed to occupy the fortified positions of the Bely antitank region. With the limited forces available it was impossible to hold the city.

At 0719 hours on October 5 General Khomenko reported to General Konev, now in command of Western Front, that the 242nd, 107th Motorized (former 107th Tank), and 250th Divisions had been fighting in encirclement for two days. They had run out of ammunition. Since German forces had seized Bely, under the circumstances he requested permission for the three divisions to break out and withdraw to the northeast. Meanwhile, the 247th Rifle Division of 31st Army in Reserve Front was attempting to defend along the Ugra River in a chaotic situation due in part to an abortive attempt to redeploy to the south in the first days of the defensive. On October 7 the German encirclement was completed near Vyazma. The remnants of the 250th and 242nd Divisions passed to the control of this Army while the headquarters of 30th Army went into reserve. The 31st Army commander, Maj. Gen. V. N. Dalmatov, was ordered to organize a defense of the second belt of the Rzhev-Vyazma line. Other than remnants of these two divisions he had under command only the rump of the 247th, which was defending in the vicinity of Sychyovka.

In order to put an end to the confusion that arose during the retreat, at 0810 hours on October 8 Dalmatov ordered Col. S. P. Tarasov, commander of the 247th, to gather together all the units that had retreated to the area of Sychyovka and to the north of that point. The next day, around 500 men of the 250th emerged from encirclement in the Olenino area and arrangements were made to move them by rail to Sychyovka. Another 450-500 men of the division, along with remnants of the 242nd, broke out in the Gusevo area. On October 10 the 247th fell into encirclement by the 1st Panzer Division. Tarasov decided to disable the division's heavy weapons and equipment, split up his personnel into small groups, and begin to make their way out to friendly forces. Several groups, numbering as many as 681 men, managed to escape, nominally forming a composite 916th Rifle Regiment. The 250th's 926th Regiment had been destroyed and on October 14 the 916th was incorporated into the 250th Division as a replacement while the 247th was disbanded. The regiment would later be redesignated as a new 926th.

== Battle of Kalinin ==
The division was transferred to 29th Army on October 15. Due to its heavy casualties the Army did not consider the division a combat-effective unit during the following months. In its first orders received the same day the 250th, along with the 220th Rifle Division, "with their elements will continue to stubbornly defend in accordance with the orders in Military Order No. 029 and prevent the enemy from interfering in the operations" while other forces of the front prepared a counterattack against the German armor beginning to move north of the city.

While retreating to the Kalinin area from Rzhev, the division, along with its Army, became part of the newly formed Kalinin Front on October 17, remaining under command of General Konev. On the 18th he reported that both divisions were falling back northwest of Rzhev under German pressure. In a report on the strength of 29th Army issued on October 20 the 250th was stated as having about 1,000 "bayonets" (riflemen and sappers) under command, in part consisting of stragglers that had been gathered in; its fighting ability was rated "low". The next day, the 250th and 220th were reassigned to 22nd Army, "to prevent an enemy breakthrough to Torzhok from the direction of Selizharovo or Rzhev." By October 23 the Germans were still advancing slowly, with much air and artillery support, against the "skeletal" remnants of the division, but it was still offering resistance, and in the end the German plan to advance northwest from Kalinin was stymied.

=== Demyansk Pocket ===
The 250th spent the winter in Kalinin Front, by the start of December in 31st Army, moving to the reestablished 30th Army during March 1942. In April it was reassigned to the newly-forming 53rd Army in Northwestern Front, where it remained on the southeast side of the Demyansk pocket through most of the rest of the year. In August the Army conducted local attacks against the well-fortified German II Army Corps in support of a further attempt to cut it off and annihilate it, but these were easily fended off. On December 12 General Stepanenko left the division and was replaced by Col. Vladimir Yosifovich Mizitskii. Stepanenko went on to briefly lead the 28th Guards Rifle Division before being given command of the 14th Guards Rifle Corps for the duration of the war. Mizitskii had previously served as deputy commander of the 241st Rifle Division.

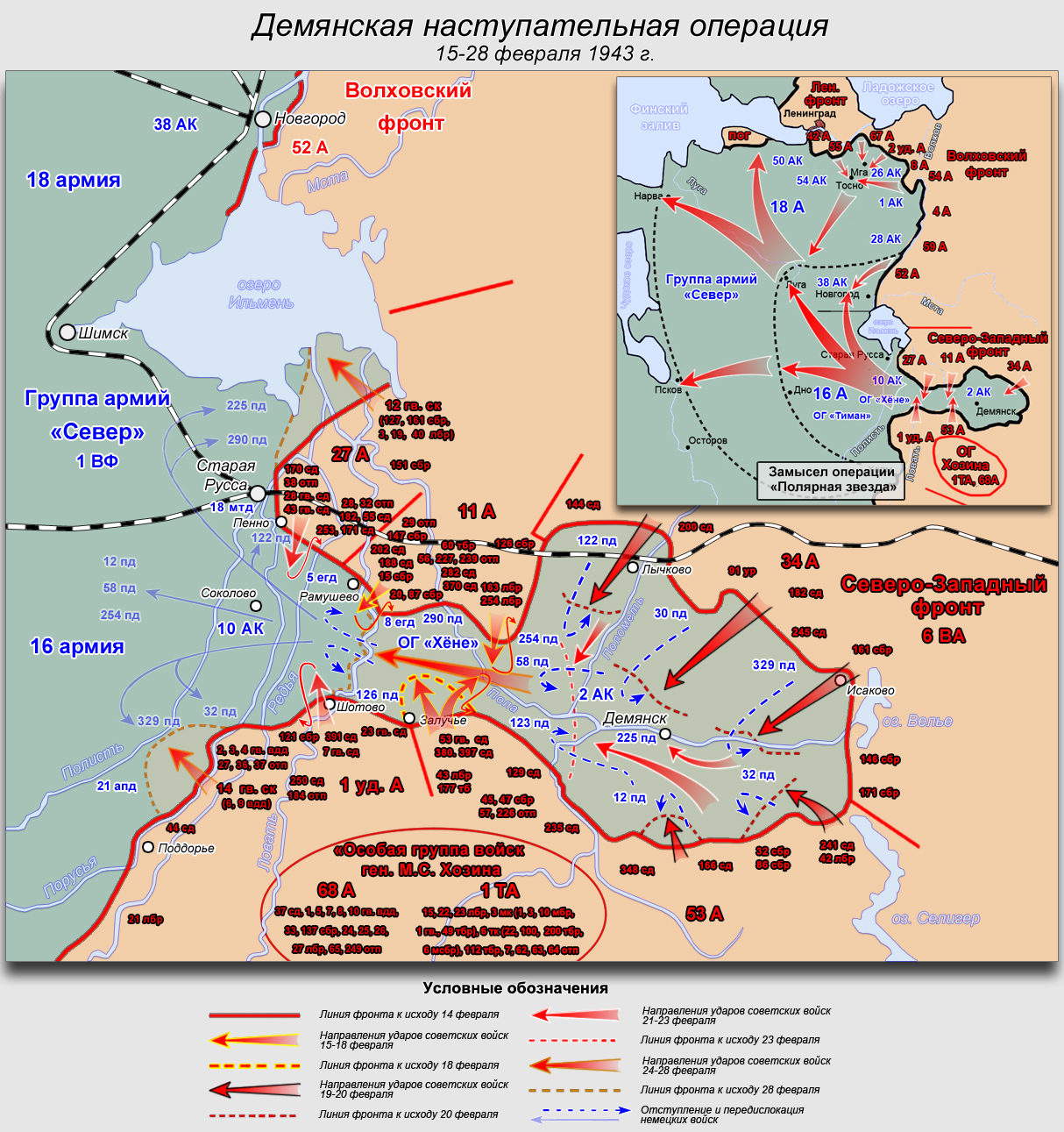
Demyansk Pocket in February 1943. Note position of the 250th in 1st Shock Army.

Marshal Timoshenko, now in command of Northwestern Front, submitted a new plan to the STAVKA on January 14, 1943, to cut off the salient and annihilate the German forces therein. Although continuing to focus on the 1st Shock and 11th Armies north and south of the narrow Ramushevo corridor into the pocket, his plan also incorporated a shock group of 53rd Army, consisting of the 235th, 241st and 250th Rifle Divisions, two ski brigades, a tank brigade and a tank regiment, plus several artillery assets. This group, along with a similar group from 34th Army, was to put pressure on II Corps to prevent it from shifting reserves while also taking advantage of any opportunities to advance into the pocket. The plan was approved on January 17, but was soon supplanted by Marshal Zhukov's more ambitious plan.

On January 31 the German High Command ordered that the Demyansk salient be evacuated, in the wake of the encirclement and upcoming destruction of 6th Army at Stalingrad. Not knowing the German plan, Zhukov was making plans for his Operation Polyarnaya Zvezda to finally crush the salient as a preliminary to the relief of Leningrad. As part of this plan the 250th was transferred to 1st Shock Army, where it took up a reserve position south of the Ramushevo corridor. 1st Shock was unable to join the attack until February 22, by which time Polyarnaya Zvezda had already failed, and the 250th saw little combat. The German evacuation had begun on February 17 and ended on February 28.

=== Move to the South ===
In early March, following the German evacuation, the 250th got new orders to re-deploy to the new 2nd Reserve Army, in reaction to the German winter counteroffensive:

The STAVKA of the Supreme High Command orders:
1. Form a Reserve Front effective at 2400 hours on 13 March 1943.
2. The Reserve Front will include:
a) the 2nd Reserve Army, consisting of the 129th, 235th, 250th, 348th, 380th, and 397th Rifle Divisions, re-stationed in the Yelets, Lipetsk and Lebedian regions...

In April, 2nd Reserve became the 63rd Army, assigned to Bryansk Front, and the division was also assigned to 35th Rifle Corps, where it would remain for the duration. The Army was under command of Lt. Gen. V. Ya. Kolpakchi.

== Operation Kutuzov ==
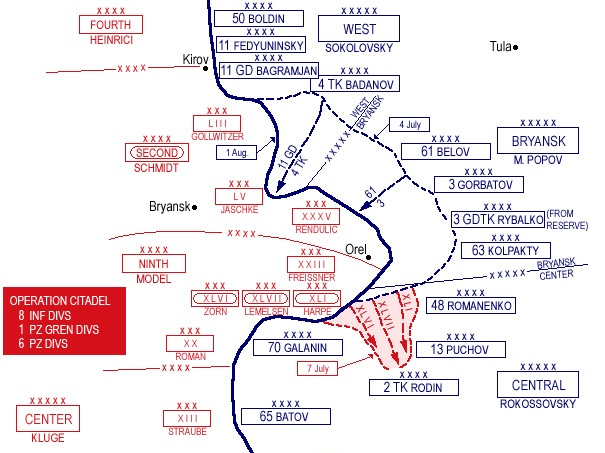
Map of Operation Kutuzov. Note position of 63rd Army.

63rd Army was deployed on the left (south) flank of Bryansk Front, adjacent to Central Front which was holding the northern half of the Kursk salient. Bryansk Front was facing the German-held salient around Oryol. The Soviet plan was to exhaust the expected German offensive toward Kursk before beginning its own summer offensive north and south of the salient. For his part in the northern attack Kolpakchi formed a shock group of six rifle divisions organized in a first and a second echelon plus four Guards heavy tank regiments (KV tanks), a tank regiment, the 1st Guards Tank Corps, four self-propelled artillery regiments, and several artillery units. 35th Corps formed the second echelon, but the 250th was short one rifle regiment. The planned breakthrough sector was 9 km-wide on the Army's right flank from Vyazhi to Orlovka, and 1st Guards Tanks was to be committed only after the German defense was fully penetrated.

Colonel Mizitskii was removed from command on July 5 due to poor performance. He was later appointed as deputy commander of 356th Rifle Division; in September he would be mortally wounded near Chernihiv during a German air raid. The new commander of the 250th was Col. Ivan Vasilevich Mokhin. He had previously led the 272nd and 348th Rifle Divisions and would be promoted to the rank of major general on November 17. The offensive began on July 12, and the division entered the fighting the next day, seizing the Berezovets strongpoint as one of the Army's significant successes that day. The conditions had now been attained for the commitment of 1st Guards Tanks, but this went slowly due to German air attacks. The next day the forces of 63rd and the neighboring 3rd Army began arriving at the Oleshnya River as German reserves began appearing in the form of the 2nd and 8th Panzer Divisions. Their counterattacks rapidly slowed the advance of the 63rd's rifle divisions and on July 16 Kolpakchi ordered them to temporarily go over to the defense.

By July 23 the gradually retreating German forces were attempting to establish a new defense line along the west bank of the Oka River. 3rd and 63rd Armies were ordered to regroup as quickly as possible, preempt this effort, and capture Oryol by concentric attacks from north and south. This offensive was set to begin on July 25, with the 63rd providing the southern force. Kolpakchi chose to attack from his left flank with three divisions and a tank brigade, reaching Oryol along the Rybnitsa River. The 250th, along with the 26th Tank Regiment, was ordered to turn over the Novaya Derevnya–Bogoroditskoe sector to the 287th Rifle Division before attacking along the line Bogoroditskoe–Domnino. It was then to capture the line from Kryukovka to Height 252.7, before attacking toward Tikhonovka. The Army was organized into a single echelon, along a fairly narrow sector of the front. The offensive was preceded by heavy air and artillery raids against German fortifications, artillery positions, and supply links. On the offensive's first day the Army encountered heavy resistance along the west bank of the Optukha River. After fierce fighting the 250th, along with the 287th and 41st Rifle Divisions, had captured the line running along the line of Height 228.5–the nameless heights 1.5 km west of Dadurovo–the eastern slopes of Height 241.3. The German forces had not been seriously disrupted by the artillery and air preparation. Kolpakchi made an effort to renew the offensive overnight, but this was unsuccessful. Another artillery preparation was laid down on the morning of July 26, but during the day only the 287th Division made minor gains. Kolpakchi, lacking reserves, ordered his divisions to dig in temporarily in preparation for a renewal on July 28.

When the attack was renewed the 250th achieved considerable success, capturing a number of strongpoints on Heights 241.0 and 234.2 before getting involved in heavy fighting for Stanovoi Kolodez. However, on the following day the defenders took advantage of previously prepared positions along the line Gremyachii–Kozinovka and again put up stubborn resistance. All attempts by the 250th and 41st Divisions to break through to Oryol were unsuccessful. Kolpakchi again ordered his troops to dug in before a further regrouping. On August 2 the Army's forces overcame the intermediate defense line Stanovoi Kolodez–Olovyannikovo. At dawn the following day a further attack forced the remaining German troops to fall back toward the city, as the vanguards of 3rd Army were advancing from the north. At 2300 hours 63rd Army went over to the attack along its entire front; the German forces fell back almost without resistance until they dug in along the city's outskirts at dawn. Street fighting erupted in the morning and by 1900 hours Oryol was firmly under Soviet control. On August 5 the two Armies began regrouping and reorganizing for pursuit.

By the end of August 11 the 3rd and 63rd Armies reached a line from Dronovo–Kreml–Shakhovtsy. Dmitrovsk-Orlovsky was liberated the next day. The pursuit continued until August 17–18 when the Hagen line of defences was reached at the base of the salient. At this point the Soviet forces began preparing an operation to liberate Bryansk.

== Into Belarus ==
Bryansk was taken on September 17, and on October 10 the Front was disbanded, with 63rd Army going to Central Front (as of October 20, Belorussian Front) before the end of September. As of October 1 it was facing the XXIII Army Corps of 9th Army in the area of Gomel.

=== Gomel-Rechitsa Offensive ===
This offensive took place in several stages. In the first stage the 63rd was one of five armies tasked with seizing and expanding multiple bridgeheads over the Pronya, Sozh, and Dniepr Rivers north and south of Gomel. One of these had been created by 5th and 250th Divisions when they captured Vietka from the 253rd Infantry Division on the west bank of the Sozh, north of Gomel, between September 30-October 3. The initial efforts to expand this bridgehead were unsuccessful. Kolpakchi now reinforced it with 40th Rifle Corps' 287th and 348th Divisions, with the aim breaking out and attacking the forces of German XXXV Army Corps defending the Gomel bridgehead from the north. This effort fared no better. The offensive's second stage began on October 15, but the 63rd Army was only assigned to make strong diversionary attacks close to Gomel while the main effort was made in the south. This effort had limited success on the front of 61st Army but gained a significant bridgehead over the Dniepr on 65th Army's front. This stage ended on October 20 and the offensive as a whole was halted on November 1.

=== Rahachow-Zhlobin Offensive ===
On February 18, 1944, 63rd Army was disbanded and 35th Corps was reassigned to 3rd Army, in what was now 1st Belorussian Front; it would remain in this Army for the duration. Up to February 21 the Army was defending and preparing for an offensive with the aim of forcing the Dniepr; by this date its front extended 88 km from Rudnia along the Dniepr to Zhlobin. The Rahachow-Zhlobin Offensive began that day, preceded by an extensive air preparation and a 10-minute artillery fire raid, but the former 63rd Army divisions were in second echelon. The 250th remained in reserve until it was committed to help force the Drut River near Ozerany on February 23. This was successful, and when the offensive was halted on February 26 the 3rd Army had advanced almost 30 km, placing the Front's forces in ideal positions from which to mount an offensive toward Babruysk come summer.

=== Operation Bagration ===
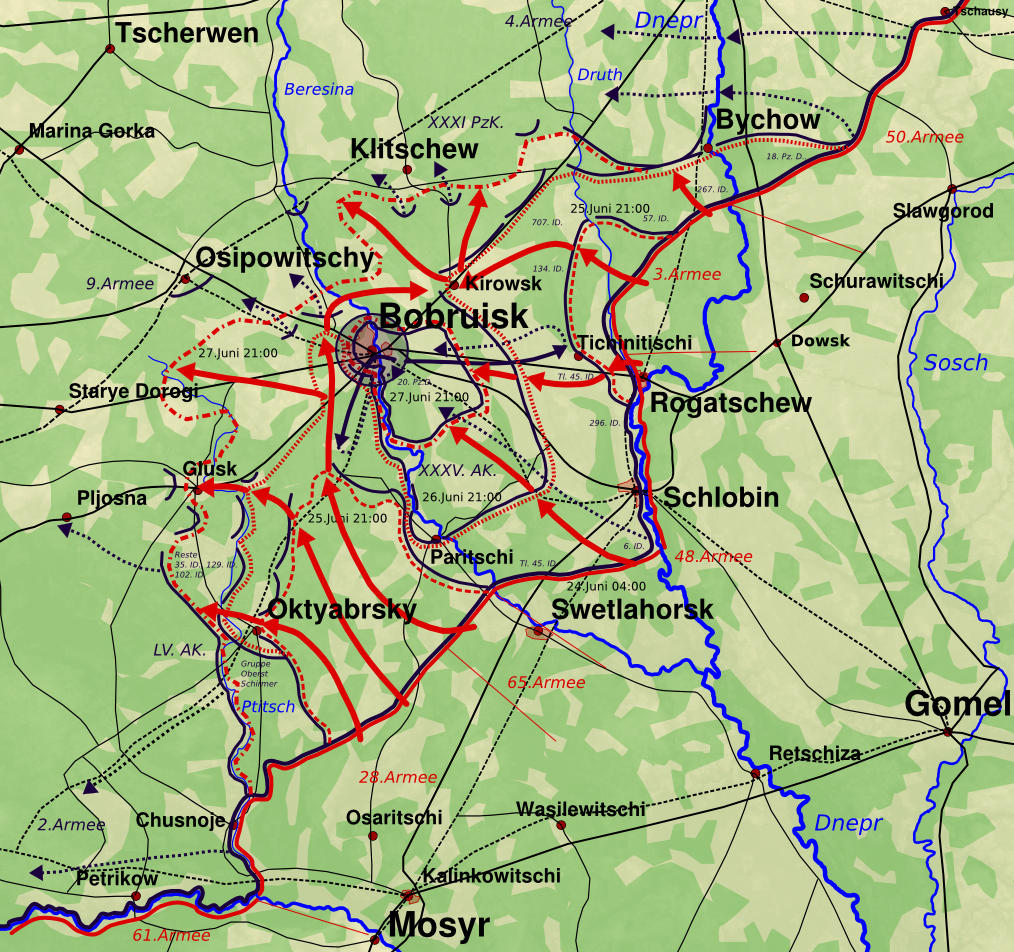
Bobruisk operation - June 24–27. Note positions of 3rd Army.

The commander of 3rd Army, Lt. Gen. (as of June 29, Col. Gen.) A. V. Gorbatov, decided that while securely defending the line from Yanovo to Khomichi on the Army's right flank with part of his forces, he would launch the main attack on the left flank along the sector from Ozerany to the mouth of the Dobritsa River in the general direction of Novoselki, Filippkovichi and Staraya Sharoevshchina. The Army would have an operational formation in two echelons. The right-flank units of 35th Corps were to assist 80th Rifle Corps in the capture of Ozerany. Once the Dobritsa was reached the success would be developed by the 9th Tank Corps and the Army's second echelon, with the objective of assisting 48th Army in taking Babruysk, and the 50th Army in developing the offensive to the west.

At the outset, on June 23, the 35th Corps, under command of Maj. Gen. V. G. Zholudev, formed one of the two first echelon assault corps of the Army, packed into less than 10 km of front opposite the northern half of the sector held by the German 134th Infantry Division. On the second day of the offensive, at 0400 hours, the assault force unleashed a massive two-hour bombardment on the defenders in the Rahachow area, but by 0800 only the first line of German trenches had been taken, as bad weather had scrubbed the planned air support. As the weather cleared towards evening, further lines were taken, and the 9th Tanks prepared to exploit a breakthrough. Northwest of Babruysk on June 26, the tankers cut the road to Mogilev behind the German XXXV Corps, with 35th and 41st Rifle Corps close behind and the 134th Infantry shattered and in flight. On the following day Babruysk was surrounded, along with most of German 9th Army, and it fell to the 250th to help clear and liberate the city, for which the men and women of the division received an honorific:

BOBRUYSK... 250th Rifle Division (Major General Mokhin, Ivan Vasilevich)... The troops who participated in the liberation of Bobruysk, by the order of the Supreme High Command of 29 June 1944, and a commendation in Moscow, are given a salute of 20 artillery salvoes from 224 guns.

On July 2 the division would also be awarded the Order of the Red Banner for its role in the breakthrough to Babruysk.

Immediately following this victory the 3rd Army began to exploit westward. On its main attack axis, at 1800 hours on July 1 the 35th Corps captured the district center of Cherven, cutting the Mogilev–Minsk road, and on the next day, having overcome increasing German resistance along the Minsk road, linked up with units of 2nd Belorussian Front's 50th Army and reached the line Fedorovsk–Khvoiniki. On July 19, as the 250th advanced toward Białystok, General Mokhin was seriously wounded and evacuated to hospital. He was released from hospital in February, 1945, after which he took command of the 2nd formation of the 50th Reserve Rifle Division. Col. Mikhail Andreevich Grekov took over the 250th until July 24, when he was replaced by Col. Makhmud-Abdul-Rza Abilov. This officer, of Lezgin nationality, had previously led the 70th Rifle Division before being wounded. He would be promoted to the rank of major general on April 20, 1945, and would command the division into the postwar. The 250th was one of the first Red Army units into Białystok on July 27, and in recognition the division was awarded the Order of Suvorov, 2nd Degree, on August 9.

== Into Poland and Germany ==
During July the division, along with its Army and Corps, had been transferred to 2nd Belorussian Front, where it would remain for the next six months. On September 6 the 250th played a large role in the liberation of Ostrołęka, and the 918th Rifle Regiment (Lt. Col. Ivashchenko, Ivan Andreevich) was awarded its name as a battle honor. On September 15 the 926th Regiment would receive the Order of Suvorov, 3rd Degree, for its part in the same fighting.

=== Vistula-Oder Offensive ===
At the start of this operation on January 14, 1945, 3rd Army was deployed along the line Mlynarz - the height southeast of Dombrowka. 35th Corps shared duties with 41st Corps in launching the main attack in the direction of Krasnosielc. By the end of the first day, 3rd Army had crushed the defending German 292nd and 129th Infantry Divisions and had broken through to a depth of 5 km on a 10 km front. However, on the next day, the Army's units ran into armor of the Grossdeutchland Panzer Division, halting the advance and even losing some ground. The advance continued on January 17 against strong resistance, and by the end of the day Krasnosielc was being contested. On January 22, the 250th assisted in the taking of Allenstein, and the 926th Rifle Regiment (Maj. Mudrov, Vasilii Fyodorovich) received its name as an honorific. The next day, elements of the Army captured the important center of Willenberg, but spent the next three days fighting off repeated counterattacks. Following this, the advance continued on Guttstadt, while other elements of the Front reached the Baltic and cut off the German forces in East Prussia. On February 19 the 918th and 922nd Rifle Regiments, as well as the 790th Artillery Regiment, would be awarded the Order of the Red Banner while the 308th Antitank Battalion won the Order of Alexander Nevsky, all for their part in the breakthrough of the German defenses north of Warsaw.

==== East Prussian Offensive ====
In February, 3rd Army was reassigned to 3rd Belorussian Front, fighting in East Prussia. On April 5, the 926th Rifle Regiment was given the Order of the Red Banner, while the 790th Artillery Regiment received the Order of Alexander Nevsky, both for their roles in the capture of Wormditt, Melzak, and the surrounding area.

=== Berlin Campaign ===
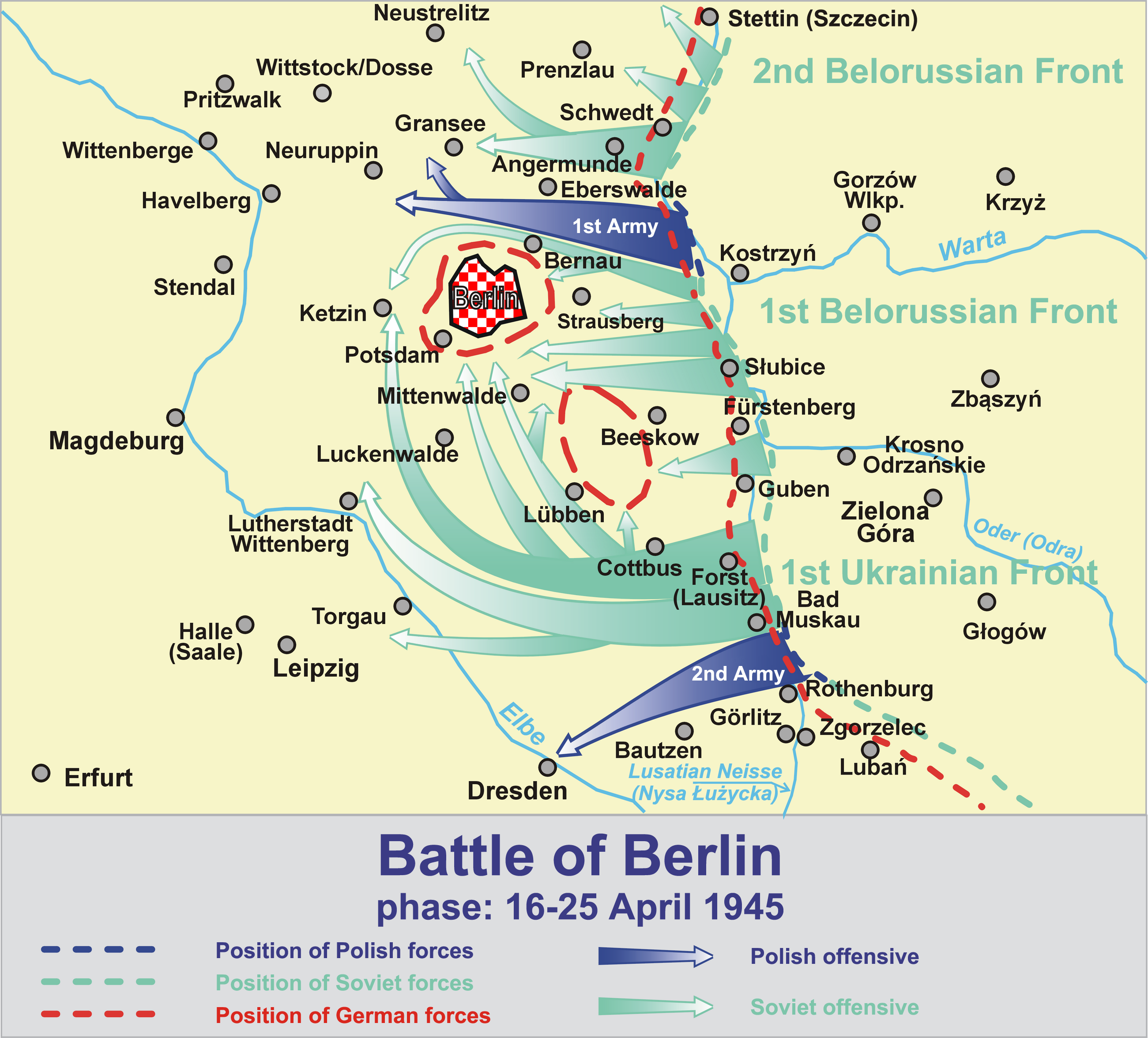
Battle of Berlin April 16–25. Note position of encircled 9th Army.

In April, 3rd Army was once again reassigned, this time to back to 1st Belorussian Front, in preparation for the assault on the German capital. 3rd Army, just arriving from East Prussia, was in the Front's second echelon, concentrated in the area Trebow–Polenzig–Sternberg. By April 25 a large grouping of German forces under command of 9th Army had been encircled southeast of Berlin jointly by 1st Belorussian and 1st Ukrainian Fronts and the 3rd Army was committed to the operation to complete the destruction of this pocket. 35th Corps received orders to attack in the general direction of Kablow and Potz with the objective of reaching the line from Groß Köris to the northwestern shore of the Hoelzerner See to the northwestern shore of the Langer See in conjunction with 41st Corps.

The following day several of the 250th's subunits were rewarded for successes in capturing Braunsberg in Ostpreußen earlier in the East Prussian campaign. The 918th Rifle Regiment received the Order of Kutuzov, 3rd Degree, the 922nd Regiment was given the Order of Alexander Nevsky, and the 418th Sapper Battalion was awarded the Order of the Red Star. In addition, the 308th Antitank Battalion was decorated with the Order of Bogdan Khmelnitsky, 3rd Degree, for its role in the fighting for the Heiligenbeil Pocket.

On April 28 the 35th and 41st Corps were engaged in heavy fighting with the German grouping covering the right flank of the 9th Army's forces, which were trying to break through from the Wendish-Buchholz–Halbe area to the west. As a result of this fighting, units of both Corps, having beaten off up to six counterattacks by infantry and tanks, forced the Hoelzerner See and advanced 500-1,000m to the southeast. By the end of the month the pocket had been eliminated, with roughly two-thirds of its original strength either killed or captured.

When the shooting stopped the division was along the Elbe River, northeast of Magdeburg, and the final full title carried by its men and women was 250th Rifle, Bobruysk, Order of the Red Banner, Order of Suvorov Division. (Russian: 250-я стрелковая Бобруйская Краснознамённая ордена Суворова дивизия).

== Postwar ==
In a final award, on June 11 the 918th Rifle Regiment was decorated with the Order of Suvorov, 3rd Degree, for its part in the liquidation of 9th Army southwest of Berlin.

The division was moved to the Minsk Military District with the 35th Rifle Corps postwar. It was stationed in Barysaw and was disbanded in July 1946, along with the rest of the Corps. General Abilov moved briefly to deputy command of the 96th Guards Rifle Division before taking the same position in 41st Rifle Corps. For most of the years before his retirement in 1955 he commanded the 216th Rifle Division.
