= 153rd Rifle Division (1942) =

- Active: March – December 1942
- Country: Soviet Union
- Branch: Red Army
- Type: Infantry
- Engagements: Battle of Stalingrad

The 153rd Rifle Division (Russian: 153-я стрелковая дивизия) was an infantry division of the Red Army during World War II, active from March to December 1942. For its actions in the Battle of Stalingrad it became the 57th Guards Rifle Division.

== History ==
Colonel Nikolay Aleksandrovich Nikitin was appointed division commander in February 1942. The division formed at Chapayevsk in the Volga Military District beginning on 4 March, in accordance with an order of 1 February. The division arrived on the Stalingrad Front on 12 July, as part of the 63rd Army. The division took defensive positions on the left bank of the Don near the stanitsas of Kazanskaya and Vyoshenskaya. Nikitin was sent to command training courses and replaced by Colonel Andrey Pavlovich Karnov on 10 October. The 153rd fought as part of the Don Front and then shifted to the Southwestern Front on 29 October. Until December the division continued to defend its previous lines on the left bank of the Don. From 16 December, during the start of Operation Little Saturn, the division went over to the offensive, and as part of the front destroyed three Italian divisions and liberated 38 settlements.

The division was the easternmost (leftmost) unit of the 1st Guards Army with its sector stretching to the junction with the 3rd Guards Army, and operated on the secondary axis of advance for the operation. It was placed under the direct operational control of the headquarters. Opposite the division were elements of the Italian Torino, Pasubio, and Celere Cavalry Divisions, spread out along a broad front. The division was tasked with the attack towards Meshkov in conjunction with the 6th Guards Rifle Corps, whose objective was to encircle and destroy the Italian troops in the Boguchar–Meshkov–Migulinskaya area. The 18th Tank Corps, tasked with the encirclement and destruction of the Italian units on the south bank of the Don, was assigned to operate in conjunction with the two infantry units.

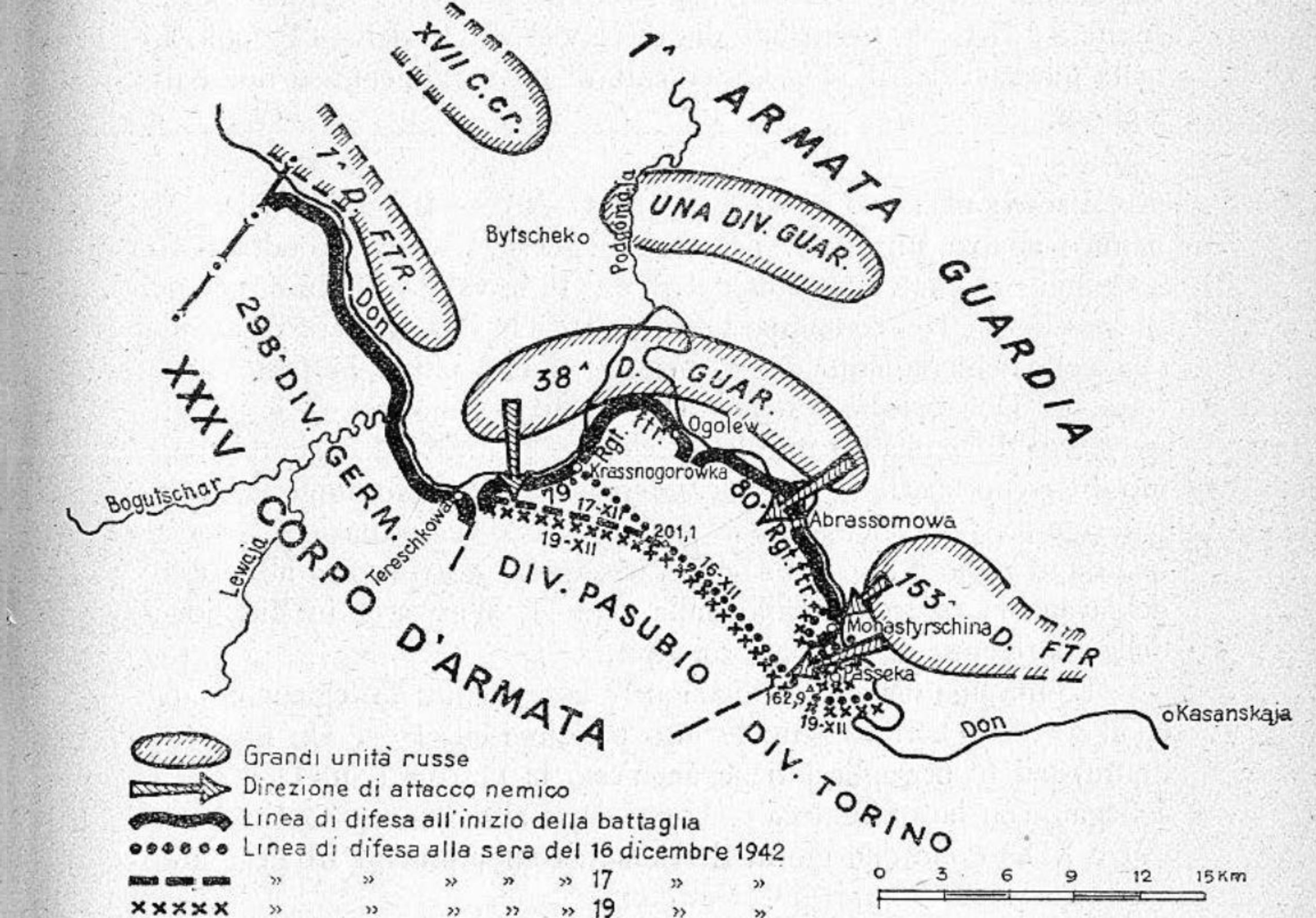
The 153rd's attacks against the Pasubio and Torino divisions, 16 to 19 December

The operation began on 16 December with the artillery preparation beginning at 07:45. The 2nd and 3rd Rifle Battalions of the 563rd Rifle Regiment forced a crossing of the Don, surprising the Italian troops with a bayonet charge. The 153rd's war diary described the Italian troops as fleeing from the frontline in panic. The 5th company of the 563rd's 2nd Battalion took the first Italian trench line. Developing the offensive successfully, the Italian troops abandoned Abrosimovo without much of a fight at 9:30, and the division's units captured Hill 175.5 and 53 Italian prisoners from the Torino Division. Having broken the Italian line between Abrosimovo and Monastyrshchina, the 563rd continued the offensive. The regimental commander moved his command post across the river to Abrosimovo. By the end of 16 December the offensive successfully developed. The Italians in Paseka resisted stubbornly, but were broken. The units reached the line of hill 157.9 on the right and Paseka on the left. During the day the division captured 300 Italian soldiers and equipment, at the cost of more than 200 killed and wounded.

Despite the success on the first day, the task of capturing the second section of Boguchar sovkhoz and Sukhoy Donets had not been accomplished. The division report blamed the delay on the slow advance of the neighboring 38th Guards Rifle Division on the right, which failed to take Hill 266.3. Italian resistance stiffened on the next day and the 563rd became bogged down in fighting for Belaya Gorka-1 and Sukhoy Donets.

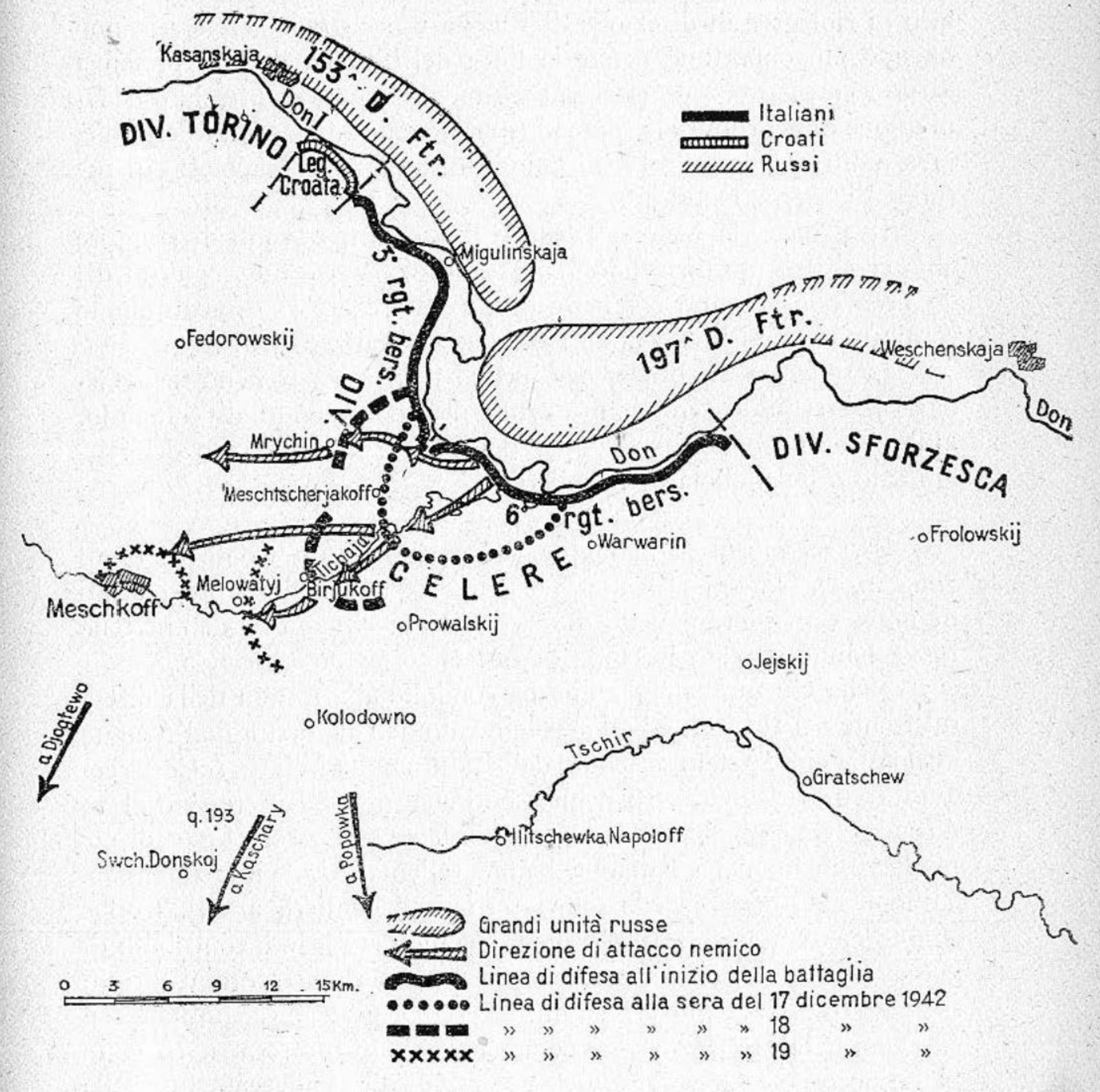
The 153rd's attacks against the Celere Division, 17 to 19 December

By the end of 18 December the division captured Mrykhin, Meshcheryakov, Batalshchikov, Biryukov, Gromtsansky, and Tikhonovskoy.

During the day on 19 December, the 563rd Regiment continued sustained fighting in the Sukhoy Donets area. Breaking the Axis resistance, the regiment captured Sukhoy Donets and began advancing on Kulinkin, which fell without resistance. In Meshkov were the Croatian Light Transport Brigade and what the Soviets believed were SS troops dispatched from France, tasked with holding back the Soviet advance on Meshkov from the direction of Melovaty. The 566th Regiment continued advancing on Konovalov with one battalion, while the 557th, resuming the advance towards Meshkov, had to abandon Melovaty in the face of a counterattack. Meanwhile the training battalion took Beschetny after sustained fighting.

Before dawn on 20 December, the 563rd Rifle Regiment reached the approaches to Kalmykov, from where the Celere division had attempted to break out through Meshkov. After regrouping, the 557th Rifle Regiment took Melovaty at 14:00 after an hour of fighting and entered Meshkov, linking up with two brigades of the 18th Tank Corps to cut off the town. The regiment took Meshkov together with the tank brigades. The 566th and 563rd Regiments captured Kalmykov during the day, with the remaining Italian troops from the Celere Division surrendering after being attacked by the 563rd from three sides. The capture of Meshkov and Kalmykov fulfilled the division objectives for the operation.

By 21 December, the remnants of the Italian troops attempted to escape in small groups towards Millerovo. The division was given the new mission of destroying the retreating troops and to concentrate on the line of Verkhnyakovsky and Melovaty by 20:00 on 21 December, and to be prepared for further operations towards Alekseyevo-Lozovskaya by the morning of 22 December. The division formed an all-around defense around the settlements of Meshkov, Melovaty and Nazarov. Its elements made contact with the 6th Guards Rifle Corps on 21 December, completing the encirclement of the Italian troops around Boguchar and Migulinskaya. The regiments conducted reconnaissance, finding that there were no organized Axis units nearby, only small groups. Over the next several days, the division continued to advance south, although it withdrawn to the army reserve on 23 December due to the "exceptionally catastrophic situation" with fuel in the division and a lack of ammunition. Elements of the division saw sporadic combat with remnants of the Italian 8th Army in the Kozly and Alekseyevo-Lozovskaya areas and reported the capture of more than 400 prisoners in late December.

On 24 December, Karnov reported to the army headquarters that the division suffered from an "exceptionally catastrophic situation with fuel, especially for artillery tractors, the artillery can't move further, and the poor ammunition situation." These logistical problems kept the division out of the major fighting for Chertkovo to the west. The division ended 1942 holding defensive positions northeast of Chertkovo in the area of Mankovo-Kalitvenskaya and Bakay. For its demonstrated "courage, steadfastness, courage, discipline, organization, and the heroism of its personnel" during the operation, the 153rd was reorganized an elite Guards unit designated the 57th Guards Rifle Division on 31 December.
