= 348th Rifle Division =

348th Rifle Division (August 15, 1941 – June 1946)
- Active: 1941–1946
- Country: Soviet Union
- Branch: Red Army
- Type: Division
- Role: Infantry
- Engagements: Battle of Moscow; Battles of Rzhev; Battle of Demyansk (1943); Operation Kutuzov; Battle of Smolensk (1943); Battle of the Dnieper; Operation Bagration; Bobruysk Offensive; Vistula-Oder Offensive; Battle of Königsberg
- Decorations: Order of the Red Banner; Order of Kutuzov
- Battle honours: Bobruisk

Commanders
- Notable commanders: Maj. Gen. Anisim Stefanovich Liukhtikov; Col. Ivan Afanasevich Ilichev; Maj. Gen. Ivan Fyodorovich Grigorevskii; Maj. Gen. Nikolai Aleksandrovich Nikitin; Col. Mikhail Andreevich Grekov

The 348th Rifle Division was first formed in August 1941, as a standard Red Army rifle division, at Kuybyshev. It was assigned to 60th Reserve Army shortly after forming and took part in the winter counteroffensive in front of Moscow. Until the end of 1942 it was involved in the dismal and costly battles around the Rzhev Salient, until it was shifted to take part in the equally difficult fighting around the Demyansk Salient. Both of these German positions were evacuated in March 1943, and, after rebuilding, the division returned to the front to take part in the summer offensive along the Smolensk axis. During Operation Bagration the 348th distinguished itself in the liberation of Bobruysk, and received the name of that city as an honorific. Not long after it was also decorated for its role in the liberation of Białystok. In 1945 it helped to liberate northern Poland during the Vistula-Oder Offensive, before being reassigned to 3rd Belorussian Front in East Prussia. In the last weeks of the war it formed part of the reserves of 1st Belorussian Front during the Berlin Operation.

== Formation ==
The division officially formed on August 15, 1941, in the Volga Military District at Kuybyshev. Its order of battle was as follows:

- 1170th Rifle Regiment
- 1172nd Rifle Regiment
- 1174th Rifle Regiment
- 916th Artillery Regiment
- 472nd Sapper Battalion

Postwar photo of Maj. Gen. A.S. Liukhtikov

Colonel Anisim Stefanovich Liukhtikov was assigned to command of the division on the day it began forming, and he continued in command until September 21, 1942, being promoted to the rank of Major General on August 4 of that year.

In November the division was transferred to the Moscow Military District and added to the 60th (Reserve) Army which was forming there. On November 29 it was assigned to the 30th Army in Western Front. On December 1 it unloaded and concentrated in the area of Zaprudnaya. At the outset of the Moscow counteroffensive on December 6 the division, along with the 18th and 24th Cavalry Divisions, was directed to make a secondary attack toward Rogachevo. In late December the division, along with 30th Army, was shifted to Kalinin Front, and the 348th remained there until the end of 1942. For most of the year it was under command of 30th Army, but in August it was one of the first formations assigned to the re-forming 39th Army, and served in it until December. In September, General Liukhtikov was appointed to command of 39th Army rear services, and Col. Ivan Afanasevich Ilichev was given command of the 348th, which he would hold until April 21, 1943.

=== Operation Mars ===
During the Second Rzhev-Sychevka Offensive Operation, 39th Army was positioned at the apex of the Rzhev Salient, roughly along the line of the upper Volga River. The 348th, which had been in Front reserve for rebuilding for about one month, was the Army's reserve formation. Maj. Gen. A. I. Zygin, commander of 39th Army, had been assigned a rather simple mission which was largely diversionary while the main effort to pinch out the salient took place farther south. His plan was to pinch out a salient of his own, using his 135th, 158th, and 373rd Rifle Divisions, plus two tank brigades, to encircle the German 206th Infantry Division, allowing him to commit the 348th to advance on the town of Olenino beginning on the third day. The key to the operation was seizing the fortified village of Urdom.

When the attack opened on November 25, the other forces of 39th Army did make some initial progress against the thinly-held German lines, and expanded their bridgeheads across the Volga on each side of the 206th Division. Zygin, however, was not fully aware of the presence of elements of 14th Motorized and Grossdeutchland Divisions in reserve. Between them they were able to assist the 206th to contain and even push back the Soviet bridgeheads across the Volga, so the battle became a frontal offensive, and the 348th would remain in reserve until greater progress was made. On November 28, 39th Army tried to renew the offensive, but by the end of the next day Urdom was still in German hands. On November 30, the division was finally committed to the fight for Urdom, and with the help of the remnants of 135th and 373rd Rifle Divisions and a handful of KV heavy tanks to reduce German pillboxes, the village finally fell. However, the German lines held, and this advance marked the end of 39th Army's progress during the operation.

After Operation Mars was closed down, the 348th was reassigned to Northwestern Front, first, briefly, to 1st Shock Army, then to the Front reserves, and finally to 53rd Army, where it was intended to take part in the final liquidation of the Demyansk Pocket. This was forestalled by Hitler's decision to abandon the pocket voluntarily, which began on February 17, 1943. While this move freed up German forces for service elsewhere, it did the same for the Red Army, and on March 11, in the face of a deteriorating situation in the Kursk region, the STAVKA issued the following directive (No. 30071), in part:

"1. Form a Reserve Front effective at 2400 hours on 13 March 1943. 2. The Reserve Front will include: a) The 2nd Reserve Army, consisting of the 129th, 235th, 250th, 348th, 380th, and 397th Rifle Divisions, re-stationed in the Yelets, Lipetsk, and Lebedyan regions..."

This Army was under the command of Lt. Gen. V.I. Morozov. It would become the 2nd formation of 63rd Army on April 27, which was soon assigned to Bryansk Front. On April 25, Col. I. V. Mokhin took command of the division from Colonel Ilichev, but he would only hold it for about a month, until he was succeeded by Col. Ivan Fyodorovich Grigorevskii. This officer would be promoted to the rank of Major General on September 15.

=== Summer Offensive 1943 ===
Following the German offensive at Kursk the 348th, along with the rest of 63rd Army, took part in Operation Kutuzov, the Soviet offensive against the German forces in the Oryol salient north of Kursk. The division began its attack on July 12 from the area of the village of Zalegoshch. Breaking through German positions the division bypassed Oryol from the south before entering street fighting in conjunction with other Soviet forces which subsided on August 5 with the city's full liberation. In recognition of this success, Colonel Grigorevskii was awarded the Order of the Red Banner. During September, Bryansk Front advanced in the direction of its namesake city during the Smolensk Campaign, and liberated it on September 17. In the following days the 348th pressed on. On the morning of September 22 the sub-machinegun company of Lieutenant Sorokin entered the outskirts of Starodub. After receiving reconnaissance reports from this company, Grigorevskii ordered two battalions of the 1174th Rifle Regiment to begin clearing operations; during the day further reserves were committed to the fighting and by evening Starodub was freed.

As of October 1, the division was in 40th Rifle Corps of 63rd Army in Bryansk Front. Ten days later that Front was disbanded and 63rd Army was transferred to Central (later Belorussian) Front. During that Front's Gomel-Rechitsa Offensive, on September 30, just north of Gomel, two divisions of 35th Rifle Corps liberated the town of Vetka and seized a small bridgehead across the Sozh River from the 253rd Infantry Division of XXIII Army Corps. The 348th and 287th Rifle Divisions of 40 Corps were quickly ordered to reinforce the bridgehead. By December 1, both these divisions had been transferred to 35th Corps. When 63rd Army was disbanded in February 1944, the division and its Corps were transferred to 3rd Army, now in 1st Belorussian Front, although the division was soon moved to 41st Rifle Corps. The 348th would remain in this Army for the duration, and a month later returned to 35th Corps, where it would also remain for the duration.

On the eve of the 1944 summer offensive, General Grigorevskii was reassigned to command of the 61st Rifle Corps, which he would hold for the duration of the war. On November 2 he was promoted to the rank of Lieutenant General, and on April 6, 1945, he was awarded the Gold Star of a Hero of the Soviet Union for his services. He was replaced in command of the 348th for about two months by Maj. Gen. Nikolai Aleksandrovich Nikitin.

== Operation Bagration and Into Germany ==
In the plan for Bagration, the 348th's 35th Rifle Corps was chosen as one of two assault corps of 3rd Army, facing the German 134th and 296th Infantry Divisions of XXXV Army Corps north of Rogachev on the Dniepr. On the first two days the advance was slow, but at 1000 hrs. on June 25 the 35th Corps attacked the German 134th Infantry, and was joined by 9th Tank Corps, which helped open a 15 km gap between XXXV Corps and the 57th Infantry Division to the north. By midnight the German corps was falling apart, and six divisions were threatened with encirclement southwest of Bobruisk. On the next day, 9th Tank crossed the rear of XXXV Corps and began destroying the retreating German transport, while 35th and 41st Rifle Corps followed close behind. By nightfall on June 27 Bobriusk was surrounded, and the Soviet forces were reducing the pocket. Between 40,000 and 70,000 were trapped, and forces of 3rd Army were pressing in from the north. At 1000 hrs. on June 29, elements of three Soviet Armies began mopping up the city, which was completed by day's end.

On the same day, while this operation continued, the division was recognized for its role in the liberation of the city, and received its name as an honorific:

"BOBRUISK - ...348th Rifle Division (Major General Nikitin, Nikolai Aleksandrovich)... By order of the Supreme High Command of 29 June 1944 and a commendation in Moscow, the troops who participated in the battles for the liberation of Bobruisk are given a salute of 20 artillery salvoes from 224 guns."

As the Soviet advance continued through Belorussia and into Poland the division was further recognized for its service on August 9 with the award of the Order of the Red Banner for participation in the liberation of Byalistok. On August 30, General Nikitin was replaced in command by Col. Mikhail Andreevich Grekov, who would remain in command for the duration of the war. In September, 3rd Army was reassigned to 2nd Belorussian Front, and the division would take part in the Oder-Vistula Offensive under that command.

At the start of that operation on January 14, 1945, 3rd Army was deployed along the line Mlynarz - the height southeast of Dombrowka. 35th Corps shared duties with 41st Rifle Corps in launching the main attack in the direction of Krasnosielc. By the end of the first day, 3rd Army had crushed the defending German 292nd and 129th Infantry Divisions and had broken through to a depth of 5 km on a 10 km front. However, on the next day, the Army's units ran into armor of the Grossdeutchland Panzer Division, halting the advance and even losing some ground. The advance continued on the 17th against strong resistance, and by the end of the day Krasnosielc was being contested. On January 23, elements of the Army captured the important center of Willenberg, but spent the next three days fighting off repeated counterattacks. Following this, the advance continued on Guttstadt, while other elements of the Front reached the Baltic and cut off the German forces in East Prussia.

On April 5, the division was awarded the Order of Kutuzov, 2nd degree, for its role in the capture of Wormditt, Melzak, and the surrounding area, during the East Prussian campaign. In the Berlin Operation, 3rd Army formed the second echelon of 1st Belorussian Front, employed along the main direction. The 348th ended the war advancing on Berlin.

== Postwar ==
The 348th concluded hostilities with the full title of 348th Rifle, Bobruisk, Order of the Red Banner, Order of Kutuzov Division. (Russian: 348-я стрелковая Бобруйская Краснознамённая ордена Кутузова дивизия.) With the 35th Rifle Corps, the division was withdrawn to Mogilev postwar, and was transferred back to the 40th Rifle Corps. The 348th was disbanded with the corps in June 1946.
