= 250th Division =

250th Division may refer to:

- 250th Infantry Division, German Army, also known as the Blue Division or Spanish Volunteer Division
- 250th Rifle Division, Soviet Union

== See also ==
- List of military divisions by number
