= 63rd Army (Soviet Union) =

WW2 Soviet Red Army formation

- 63-я армия
- Active: 10 Jul. 1942 – 4 Nov. 1942; 27 Apr. 1943 – 18 Feb 1944
- Country: Soviet Union
- Branch: Red Army
- Type: Combined arms
- Size: Field army
- Part of: Stalingrad Front
- Engagements: World War II; Battle of Stalingrad

Commanders
- Notable commanders: Vasily Kuznetzov; Vladimir Kolpakchi

The 63rd Army (Russian: 63-я армия) was a field army established by the Soviet Union's Red Army during World War II.

== First Formation ==
The Army was formed on July 10, 1942 from the 5th Reserve Army, a part of the Reserve of the Supreme High Command.

Since July 12, 1942 the army was incorporated into the newly created Stalingrad Front for defensive battles on approaches to Stalingrad.

On August 20, 1942 the 63rd Army attacked with 197th, 203rd and 14th Guards Rifle Divisions across the river Don against the Italian Sforzesca Division (XXXV Corps) and successfully gained a short-lived bridgehead across the Don northwest of Kletskaya. The advance by 63rd Army was imitated by 1st Guards Army, then to the left of 63rd Army, with an attack on 22 August against German XI Corps west of Sirotinskaya. An Italian counterattack by Celere Cavalry Division on August 23 briefly slowed the 63rd Army, but it continued the expansion of its bridgehead with a breakout attack by 3rd Guards Cavalry Corps (which had crossed the Don on August 23) and by the 14th Guards Rifle Division. Eventually, the arrival of Italian reinforcements on August 28 allowed the XXXV Corps and the German XVII Corps to stop the expansion of the bridgehead.

On September 30, 1942 Stalingrad Front was renamed as Don Front for the battle within the city. On October 29, 1942 the army subordinated to the reconstructed Southwestern Front for the Operation Uranus counter-offensive.

On November 4, 1942, the 63rd Army was granted Guards status and briefly transformed into the 1st Guards Army (Second Formation) before being split and reformed into the 3rd Guards Army on 5 December.

== Second Formation ==
April 27, 1943 the Army was formed for the second time on the basis of the 2nd Reserve Army. Originally it consisted of the 129th, 235th, 250th, 348th, 380th and 397th Rifle Divisions, artillery, engineering, and other parts. On April 29, 1943 the army was incorporated into the Bryansk Front. Initially it conducted defensive operations along the Zusha and Neruch Rivers and the region south of Mtsensk. It participated in Operation Kutuzov at Orel, and the Briansk and Gomel-Rechitsa Offensives. With Markian Popov's Bryansk Front at the Battle of Kursk it comprised the 5th, 41st, 129th, 250th, 287th, 348th and 397th Rifle Divisions. On October 8, 1943 the army was assigned to the Central Front (renamed as Belorussian Front on October 20, 1943). It was disbanded on February 18, 1944, with its troops transferred to the 3rd and 48th armies.

== Commanders ==
- Lieutenant General Vasily Kuznetzov (4 July – 1 November 1942)
- Lieutenant General Vasily Morozov (8 March – 14 May 1943)
- Lieutenant General Vladimir Kolpakchi (14 May 1943 – 10 February 1944)

== Structure on 1 August 1942 ==
- Army headquarters
- 14th Guards Rifle Division – General-major Afanasy Gryaznov (17 July to 31 December 1942)
- 1st Rifle Division- General-major Semenov (17 July to 31 December 1942)
- 127th Rifle Division – Colonel Zaitsev (17 July to 22 September 1942)
- 153rd Rifle Division – Colonel Nikolay Nikitin (17 July to October 1942); Colonel Karnov (from 11 October 1942)
- 197th Rifle Division – General-major M. I. Zaporozhchenko (17 July to 31 December 1942)
- 203rd Rifle Division – Colonel Kashlayev (17 July to 31 December 1942); Colonel Zdanovich (from 3 September 1942)
- 36th Tank Brigade
- 134th Tank Brigade
- 193rd Tank Brigade
- 646th Tank Battalion
- 647th Tank Battalion
- 1110th Artillery Regiment
- 1180th Anti-Tank Artillery Regiment
- 1249th Anti-Tank Artillery Regiment
- 1250th Anti-Tank Artillery Regiment
- 51st Guards Mortar Regiment
- 58th Guards Mortar Regiment
- 79th Guards Mortar Regiment
- 1413rd Sapper Battalion
- 1486th Sapper Battalion

== Structure on 1 October 1942 ==
- Army headquarters
- 14th Guards Rifle Division
- 1st Rifle Division
- 153rd Rifle Division
- 197th Rifle Division
- 203rd Rifle Division
- 6th Guards Cavalry Division- Colonel Belogorodskyi (26 July – 31 December 1942)
- 1110th Artillery Regiment
- 1180th Anti-Tank Artillery Regiment
- 1249th Anti-Tank Artillery Regiment
- 1250th Anti-Tank Artillery Regiment
- 1257th Anti-Aircraft Artillery Regiment
- 26th Machine-gun Battalion
- 28th Machine-gun Battalion
- 350th Independent Engineer Brigade
- 1486th Sapper Battalion
