= Nikolay Aleksandrovich Nikitin =

Soviet Army lieutenant general

- Born: 19 December 1900; Mikhaylovka village, Bobrovsky Uyezd, Voronezh Governorate, Russian Empire
- Died: 9 November 1984 (aged 83) Moscow, Soviet Union
- Allegiance: Russian SFSR; Soviet Union
- Branch: Red Army (later Soviet Army)
- Service years: 1919–1959
- Rank: Lieutenant general
- Commands: 153rd Rifle Division; 348th Rifle Division; 120th Guards Rifle Division; 35th Rifle Corps; 17th Rifle Corps; 45th Rifle Corps; 79th Rifle Corps
- Conflicts: Russian Civil War; World War II
- Awards: Order of Lenin (2)

Nikolay Aleksandrovich Nikitin (Russian: Николай Александрович Никитин; 19 December 1900 – 9 November 1984) was a Soviet Army lieutenant general who held corps and division command during World War II.

An ordinary soldier of the Russian Civil War, Nikitin became an officer and served in Central Asia and Ukraine during the interwar period. A corps chief of staff when Operation Barbarossa began, Nikitin escaped encirclement and rose to command the 153rd Rifle Division during the Battle of Stalingrad. After serving as a corps chief of staff through 1943 and early 1944, he commanded the 348th Rifle Division in Operation Bagration. After commanding the 120th Guards Rifle Division in late 1944, Nikitin led the 35th Rifle Corps in the Soviet advances of 1945. After the war ended in Europe he was sent to command the 17th Rifle Corps in the Soviet invasion of Manchuria. Postwar, Nikitin commanded several corps and held high-level staff positions before his retirement in the late 1950s.

== Early life and Russian Civil War ==
A Russian, Nikolay Aleksandrovich Nikitin was born on 19 December 1900 in the village of Mikhaylovka, Bobrovsky Uyezd, Voronezh Governorate. During the Russian Civil War, he was conscripted into the Red Army on 12 May 1919 and sent as a Red Army man to the Voronezh Reserve Regiment. At the beginning of June he was enrolled as a cadet in the courses for Red Commanders at the reserve battalion of the Southern Front in Kozlov. With the unit, he fought against the Mamontov raid. In battle near Yelets at the beginning of October he was wounded and concussed, after which he was in the hospital in Zadonsk and with the convalescent detachment in Voronezh until February 1920.

After recovering, Nikitin was sent to serve as a Red Army man in the 46th Howitzer Heavy Artillery Battalion of the 46th Yekaterinoslav Rifle Division. With the division, he fought against the Army of Wrangel on the Isthmus of Perekop and the Chonhar Peninsula, participating in the elimination of a White landing in the Melitopol area, battles on the lower Dnieper, the Perekop-Chongar Offensive and the suppression of anti-Soviet forces in Crimea. After the merger of the 46th Rifle Division with the 3rd Kazan Rifle Division, he served in the battalion headquarters as a copyist from December 1920.

== Interwar period ==
Nikitin was sent to the 1st Voronezh Signals Command Courses in August 1921, and after their June 1922 disbandment transferred to the 4th Kursk Infantry School. During his training there he served as an assistant platoon commander from January 1924. Graduating in September of that year, he sent to the Turkestan Front. There he served with the 11th Turkestan Rifle Regiment of the 4th Turkestan Rifle Division, as a platoon and company commander, acting battalion commander, and platoon commander and assistant chief of the regimental school in Alma-Ata. Transferred to the 8th Separate Local Rifle Battalion of the Central Asian Military District in Tashkent in November 1926, Nikitin served there as a company commander, chief of the school for junior command personnel, battalion adjutant, and again as a company commander.

Nikitin was transferred to the 14th Red Banner Mountain Rifle Regiment in Termez in December 1930, serving as a company commander. With this unit he participated in the suppression of the Basmachi movement, for which he was awarded the Order of the Red Banner of Labour of the Tajik SSR in 1931. Nikitin rose to assistant chief of staff of the 6th Turkestan Rifle Regiment of the 2nd Pridnieper Rifle Division in Andizhan in December 1931. The regiment was reorganized as the 186th Andizhan Rifle Regiment of the 62nd Rifle Division after its relocation to Pereyaslav in the Ukrainian Military District. Nikitin served as regimental chief of staff from 14 August 1932 and from September 1937 temporarily commanded the regiment. In May 1938 he reverted to regimental chief of staff of the 123rd Rifle Regiment (renumbered from the 186th) in Fastov. Now a major, he was appointed chief of the 1st section of the headquarters of the 62nd Rifle Division on 23 August 1939. Nikitin transferred to serve in the same position in the 130th Rifle Division in Mogilyov-Podolsk in April 1940. He became chief of the operations department of the headquarters of the 27th Rifle Corps in February 1941.

== World War II ==
After Operation Barbarossa began, Nikitin served with the 27th Rifle Corps of the 5th and later 37th Armies in the border battles and in the Battle of Kiev on the Southwestern Front. His unit was encircled in the area of Borispol in the Kiev pocket from 24 September to 25 October. Escaping with a group of commanders, armed, uniformed, and with his documents, now-Colonel Nikitin was appointed chief of the combat training department of the headquarters of the 40th Army of the Southwestern Front in November. He participated in the defensive battles on the line of the Tim river, northeast of Tim, Kursk Oblast. From late December to February 1942 the army conducted a series of local offensives towards Kursk and Belgorod. Nikitin was awarded the Order of the Red Banner for his performance at the headquarters on 27 March.

Nikitin was sent to the Volga Military District to command the new 153rd Rifle Division in February 1942. He oversaw the formation of the division at Chapayevsk and led it in defensive operations on the left bank of the Don as part of the 63rd Army of the Stalingrad Front on the fringes of the Battle of Stalingrad. Sent to advanced training courses at the Voroshilov Higher Military Academy in November, he was appointed chief of staff of the 35th Rifle Corps after graduating in June 1943. The corps headquarters was formed at Sverdlovsk in the Ural Military District and sent to the Bryansk Front, becoming part of the 63rd Army. Nikitin participated in the Battle of Kursk and the Bryansk offensive and on 17 August received the Order of the Patriotic War, 1st class, for his performance. In this position he was assessed as having, "despite the incomplete officering of the corps headquarters, managed to organize the headquarters for the execution of combat tasks in a short time." The corps fought in the Gomel–Rechitsa offensive and the Rogachev–Zhlobin offensive as part of the 3rd Army during the winter of 1943–1944.

Promoted to major general on 3 June 1944, Nikitin took command of the corps' 348th Rifle Division on 18 June. He led the 348th in Operation Bagration, in which it fought in the Bobruysk offensive, the Minsk offensive, and the Belostok offensive. Reaching the Narew its units fought to expand a bridgehead on the western bank of the river. For the liberation of Bobruysk the division was awarded the name of the city as an honorific and Nikitin received a second Order of the Red Banner on 30 September, the Order of Kutuzov, 2nd class, on 27 July, and second Order of the Patriotic War, 1st class on 9 September on recognition of his leadership. As commander of the 348th, he was assessed as a "versatile and strong-willed commander, knowing his duties. Energetic and takes initiative in work. Tactically versatile. Able to make decisions and execute them..." Nikitin was transferred to command the 120th Guards Rifle Division of the 41st Rifle Corps on 21 September, leading it in the liberation of Ostrołęka that month.

Nikitin rose to command the 35th Rifle Corps of the 3rd Army on 27 December. He led it in the East Prussian offensive and the Mława–Elbing offensive in early 1945. For his performance in these operations, Nikitin received praise for "perfectly analyzing the situation...didn't fail in any difficult situation...devoted his strength to how to best execute tasks. Organized the details of the battle in all aspects, as a result there was not one incident during the East Prussian offensive in which it was necessary to ask questions of him." Together with the army, the corps transferred to the 3rd Belorussian Front on 10 February and participated in the destruction of German troops in East Prussia. The 35th and its army transferred to the 1st Belorussian Front on 16 April for the Berlin offensive, in which it crossed the Oder in May, reaching the Elbe northeast of Magdeburg at the end of the war. After the end of the war in Europe, Nikitin was sent to the Far East, where on 5 July he took command of the 17th Rifle Corps of the 25th Army. Promoted to lieutenant general on 11 July, he led the 17th Rifle Corps in the Soviet invasion of Manchuria, in which it participated in the Harbin–Kirin offensive.

== Postwar ==
After the end of the war, Nikitin continued to command the corps in the Primorsky Military District. From July 1946 he commanded the 45th Rifle Corps in the same district. In March 1947 he was sent to the Higher Academic Course at the Voroshilov Academy, graduating with honors in April 1948. Nikitin commanded the 79th Rifle Corps of the 3rd Shock Army in the Group of Soviet Occupation Forces in Germany from June of that year. In March 1951 he was appointed assistant commander of the 8th Guards Army in East Germany. Nikitin then held a series of staff posts, in August 1952 becoming deputy chief of the Main Combat and Physical Training Directorate of the Ground Forces (the Combat and Physical Training Directorate from May 1953). Nikitin was appointed chief of the Directorate of Combat Training of combined arms units of the Main Combat Training Directorate of the Ground Forces in June 1956. He left Moscow to serve as senior military advisor to the commander of a military district of the Romanian Army from 27 April 1957. Nikitin was retired nearing age 60, on 23 July 1959. He died in Moscow on 9 November 1984.

== Awards and honors ==
Nikitin received the following decorations:

- Order of Lenin (2)
- Order of the Red Banner (4)
- Order of Kutuzov, 1st class (2)
- Order of Suvorov, 2nd class
- Order of Kutuzov, 2nd class
- Order of the Patriotic War, 1st class (2)
- Order of the Red Banner of Labour of the Tajik SSR
- Medals
- Foreign orders and medals
