= 57th Guards Motor Rifle Division =

Motor rifle division of the Soviet military

The 57th Guards Motor Rifle Division was a division of the Soviet Ground Forces. Volodymyr Zelenskyy's grandfather, Semyon Ivanovych Zelenskyy served in this division as rank of colonel.

== History ==
=== World War II ===
It traces its history to the 153rd Rifle Division.

The 153rd Rifle Division (Second formation) ended 1942 holding defensive positions northeast of Chertkovo in the area of Mankovo-Kalitvenskaya and Bakay. For its demonstrated "courage, steadfastness, courage, discipline, organization, and the heroism of its personnel" during the operation, the division was reorganized an elite Guards unit designated the 57th Guards Rifle Division on 31 December.

It was part of the 'operational army' (ru:Действующая_армия), that is, it was in frontline combat, from 31 December 1942 to 7 June 1944 and from 15 June 1944 to 9 May 1945. Its operations included:

- Millerovo–Voroshilovgrad operation
- Izyum–Barvenkovo offensive
- Donbass offensive
- Lower Dnepr offensive
- Dnipropetrovsk offensive
- Dnieper–Carpathian offensive
- Nikopol–Krivoi Rog offensive
- Bereznegovatoye–Snigirevka offensive
- Odessa offensive
- Operation Bagration
- Lublin–Brest offensive
- Vistula–Oder offensive
- Warsaw–Poznan offensive
- Seelow–Berlin operation
- Battle of Berlin

It fought on the Don river, in Ukraine, on the Vistula River, and in the Battle of Berlin. With 8th Guards Army of the 1st Belorussian Front May 1945.

=== Cold War ===
Until 1947, the division was part of the 4th Guards Rifle Brandenburg Red Banner Corps. In 1947, after its dissolution, it was transferred to 29th Guards Rifle Lodzinsky Red Banner Corps. It was part of 29th Guards Rifle Corps until the corps was disbanded in the late 1950s.

Became 57th Guards Motor Rifle Division on 17 May 1957 at Naumburg, still with 8th Guards Army. During the 1980s it consisted of the:

- 170th Guards Motor Rifle Regiment (Naumburg)
- 174th Guards Motor Rifle Regiment (Weißenfels)
- 241th Guards Motor Rifle Regiment (Leipzig)
- 57th Guards Tank Regiment (Zeitz)
- 128th Artillery Regiment (Zeitz)

The division withdrew from Germany in April 1993 and moved to Chelyabinsk, part of the Ural Military District. It was disbanded in June 1993.

== Popular culture ==
The 57th Guards Motor Rifle Division is featured in the board game Red Storm Rising, based on Tom Clancy's book Red Storm Rising.

The Division is also featured in the Operation (single-mission) Sledgehammer in WARNO.
