= Sukhoy Donets =

Sukhoy Donets Сухой Донец
- Selo
- Location within Voronezh Oblast Location within Russia
- Coordinates: 49°48′N 40°55′E
- Country: Russia
- Region: Voronezh Oblast
- District: Bogucharsky District
- Time zone: UTC+3:00

Sukhoy Donets (Russian: Сухой Донец) is a rural locality (a selo) and the administrative center of Sukhodonetskoye Rural Settlement, Bogucharsky District, Voronezh Oblast, Russia. The population was 788 as of 2010. There are 12 streets.

== Geography ==
Sukhoy Donets is located 41 km southeast of Boguchar (the district's administrative centre) by road, on the Don River. Monastyrshchina is the nearest rural locality.
