= Monastyrshchina, Voronezh Oblast =

Monastyrshchina Монастырщина
- Selo
- Location within Voronezh Oblast Location within Russia
- Coordinates: 49°49′N 40°54′E
- Country: Russia
- Region: Voronezh Oblast
- District: Bogucharsky District
- Time zone: UTC+3:00

Monastyrshchina (Russian: Монастырщина) is a rural locality (a selo) and the administrative center of Monastyrshchinskoye Rural Settlement, Bogucharsky District, Voronezh Oblast, Russia. The population was 1,156 as of 2010. There are 11 streets.

== Geography ==
Monastyrshchina is located on the right bank of the Don River, 36 km southeast of Boguchar (the district's administrative centre) by road. Sukhoy Donets is the nearest rural locality.
