= Alexander Gorbatov =

Soviet general (1891–1973)

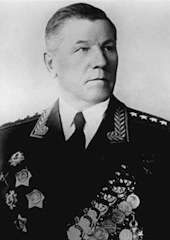
- General Gorbatov c. 1955
- Born: 21 March 1891; Pakhotino, Russian Empire
- Died: 7 December 1973 (aged 81); Moscow, Soviet Union
- Military career
- Allegiance: Russian Empire; Soviet Union
- Branch: (Russian Empire) Imperial Russian Army; Soviet Army
- Service years: 1912–1937; 1938–1958
- Rank: General of the Army (1955)
- Commands: 24th Army; 3rd Army; 5th Shock Army; 11th Guards Army; Soviet Airborne Forces; Baltic Military District
- Conflicts: World War I; Battle of Tannenberg; Battle of Galicia; Gorlice–Tarnów offensive; Brusilov offensive; Kerensky offensive; Russian Civil War; Polish–Soviet War; World War II
- Awards: Hero of the Soviet Union

Alexander Vasilyevich Gorbatov (Russian: Алекса́ндр Васи́льевич Горба́тов; 21 March 1891 – 7 December 1973) was a Russian and Soviet officer who served as an officer in the Imperial Russian Army during the First World War and as a colonel-general in the Red Army during the Second World War, and was awarded the title of Hero of the Soviet Union. Following the war, Gorbatov served as a Soviet commandant in Soviet-occupied Germany and East Germany and ultimately retired as a four-star general at the rank of General of the Army. His acclaimed autobiography, entitled "Years off My Life" was published in 1964.

== First World War and aftermath ==
Alexander Gorbatov served in the Imperial Russian Army during the course of the First World War, fighting in numerous engagements along the Eastern Front, including the Battles of Tannenburg, Galicia, Przemyśl, the Gorlice-Tarnow Offensive, both Battles of the Masurian Lakes, the Brusilov Offensive, and the Kerensky Offensive. After the October Revolution and consequent Russian Civil War, Gorbatov enlisted in the Red Army as a commander (all Soviet officers were classified as "commanders" for the Soviet leaders believed that the word "officer" was too Westernized for the Red Army) in 1919. Gorbatov served with distinction and was awarded the Order of the Red Banner for his exploits. By the end of the Russian Civil War, Gorbatov had risen to become the commander of one of the Red Guards cavalry divisions.

In April 1920, he became commander of the 58th Cavalry Regiment, and in August took command of the Separate Bashkir Cavalry Brigade. Later he commanded the 4th Turkestan Cavalry Division and the 2nd Cavalry Division in Ukraine.

== Inter-war period, Second World War, and aftermath ==
During the Great Purge of Soviet officers, Gorbatov was convicted of "being an enemy of the people" and was sent to the Kolyma gold mines as punishment. After several years of working as a manual laborer, he was rehabilitated and reinstated in the Red Army at his previous rank in March 1941. In the aftermath of the opening days of Operation Barbarossa, Gorbatov was placed in command of the 226th Rifle Division. On 27 December 1941, he was promoted to major general. After performing his duties at this position skillfully, Gorbatov was appointed commander of the 3rd Army, and was instrumental in the Red Army's drive towards Germany. Following the war, he was appointed Soviet commandant of Berlin in 1945, under the command of Marshal of the Soviet Union Georgy Zhukov. Gorbatov was commander of the Soviet Airborne Forces from 1950 to 1954 and served as commander of the Baltic Military District from 1954 to 1958. On 11 March 1955, he was promoted to General of the Army (a four-star general rank immediately inferior to the one of Marshal).

His autobiography was published in the Soviet literary magazine Novy Mir, in the March–May 1964 issue, and published in the West as "Years Off My Life".
