= Berezovets =

Berezovets Березовец
- Selo
- Location within Bryansk Oblast Location within Russia
- Coordinates: 52°15′N 34°41′E
- Country: Russia
- Region: Bryansk Oblast
- District: Komarichsky District
- Time zone: UTC+3:00

Berezovets (Russian: Березовец) is a rural locality (a selo) in Komarichsky District, Bryansk Oblast, Russia. The population was 22 as of 2010. There is 1 street.

== Geography ==
Berezovets is located 20 km south of Komarichi (the district's administrative centre) by road. Yupiter is the nearest rural locality.
