= Belaya Gorka 1-ya =

Belaya Gorka 1-ya Белая Горка 1-я
- Selo
- Location within Voronezh Oblast Location within Russia
- Coordinates: 49°47′N 40°56′E
- Country: Russia
- Region: Voronezh Oblast
- District: Bogucharsky District
- Time zone: UTC+3:00

Belaya Gorka 1-ya (Russian: Белая Горка 1-я) is a rural locality (a selo) in Sukhodonetskoye Rural Settlement, Bogucharsky District, Voronezh Oblast, Russia. The population was 169 as of 2010. There are 5 streets.

== Geography ==
Belaya Gorka 1-ya is located 46 km southeast of Boguchar (the district's administrative centre) by road. Sukhoy Donets is the nearest rural locality.
