= 287th Rifle Division =

Division of the Soviet Union's Red Army

- Active: 1st formation: July–December 1941; 2nd formation: December 1941 – summer 1945
- Country: Soviet Union
- Branch: Red Army
- Type: Rifle division
- Engagements: World War II
- Decorations: 2nd formation: Order of the Red Banner (2); Order of Suvorov 2nd class; Order of Kutuzov 2nd class; Order of Bogdan Khmelnitsky 2nd class
- Battle honours: Novograd-Volynsky (2nd formation)

The 287th Rifle Division (Russian: 287-я стрелковая дивизия) was an infantry division of the Soviet Union's Red Army during World War II, formed twice. It was first formed in the summer of 1941 and destroyed in the Bryansk pocket in the fall of 1941. The division was reformed in late December, including elements of the first formation, and served throughout the war before being disbanded in the summer of 1945.

== History ==
=== First Formation ===
The 287th began forming around 10 July 1941 at Yelets, part of the Orel Military District. Its basic order of battle included the 866th, 868th, and 870th Rifle Regiments, as well as the 851st Artillery Regiment. While still forming, the division was assigned its commander on 20 July and became part of the Bryansk Front reserves on 15 August. At the end of September, the division, possibly still trying to complete its formation, was trapped in the Bryansk pocket after the 2nd Panzer Group broke through the Soviet lines. On 3 October, the division was moved up from the reserve by rail and its eleven trains were unloaded at Brasovo station, 75 kilometers south of Bryansk. Between 3 and 5 October the division conducted unsuccessful counterattacks. The 287th was virtually destroyed by mid-October, but was not officially disbanded until 27 December.

=== Second Formation ===
The second formation of the 287th began forming in late December at Lipetsk with the same basic organization as the first formation, and quickly became part of the Bryansk Front while still forming. Its first units were formed from the remnants of the 287th's first formation that had escaped from the Bryansk pocket. The 287th joined the 3rd Army in January, and was assigned its commander in late February. The division fought in battles on the Bryansk Front and in May 1943 was transferred to the 63rd Army, still on the same front.

In October, the army was transferred to the Belorussian Front, and on 20 December the 287th was transferred to the 13th Army. The division subsequently became part of the army's 24th Rifle Corps. By April 1944, its divisional anti-tank battalion was equipped with older model 76 mm M1936 or 76 mm M1939 (USV) guns. In July the division transferred to the army's 102nd Rifle Corps. The 287th transferred to the 38th Army's 67th Rifle Corps in November, and from December 1944 to the war's end was part of the 3rd Guards Army's 76th Rifle Corps. The division fought in the Berlin Offensive from late April 1945. On 25 April, its commander, Major General Iosif Pankratov, was killed by a large mine blast.

By the end of the war, the division's honorifics were "Novograd-Volynsky, twice Order of the Red Banner, Orders of Suvorov, Kutuzov, and Bogdan Khmelnitsky." The division was disbanded in the summer of 1945 with the Central Group of Forces.
