= 397th Rifle Division =

397th Rifle Division (December 1, 1941 – January 7, 1942) 397th Rifle Division (January 14, 1942 – July 1945)
- Active: 1941 - 1945
- Country: Soviet Union
- Branch: Red Army
- Type: Division
- Role: Infantry
- Engagements: Demyansk Pocket; Operation Kutuzov; Battle of Smolensk (1943); Operation Bagration; Lublin–Brest Offensive; Baltic Offensive; Riga Offensive; Vistula-Oder Offensive; Berlin Strategic Offensive
- Decorations: Order of the Red Banner; Order of Kutuzov
- Battle honours: Sarny

Commanders
- Notable commanders: Col. Konstantin Timofeevich Ilin; Col. Rodion Nikanorovich Shabalin; Col. Boleslav Albinovich Kenevich; Maj. Gen. Nikolai Fedorovich Andonev

The 397th Rifle Division was an infantry division of the Red Army, active twice during 1941–45, fighting the German Operation Barbarossa.

It was partially raised in 1941 as an infantry division but this formation was disbanded after about five weeks. A new formation began on January 14, 1942, in the Volga Military District. It first went to the front in March, briefly assigned to the 3rd Shock Army before it was moved to the 1st Shock Army in Northwestern Front. It spent nearly a year in the dismal fighting around the Demyansk salient; during January, 1943 two of its rifle regiments were encircled and nearly destroyed during an unsuccessful offensive before escaping. During the last stages of the Demyansk battles it was in the 53rd Army. After rebuilding it moved to Bryansk Front in the new 63rd Army and took part in the summer offensive that liberated Smolensk. Late in the year it was briefly assigned to the Belorussian Front and then to the 1st Ukrainian Front; while serving under this command it won a battle honor. In late February, 1944 it became part of the 47th Army in 2nd Belorussian Front. Prior to the summer offensive it was moved again, now to the 61st Army, where it would remain for the duration. During the later stages of Operation Bagration it was decorated with the Order of the Red Banner and in the fall during the campaign in the Baltic states it would also receive the Order of Kutuzov. By the end of the year the 61st Army was assigned to 1st Belorussian Front and the 397th fought through Poland and eastern Germany during the winter and spring of 1945, eventually taking part in the offensive on Berlin. Its soldiers had by then compiled a distinguished record of service, but despite this the division was disbanded in July.

== 1st Formation ==
The early history of the 397th Rifle Division is a convoluted tale. A new rifle division began forming on December 1, 1941, in the Far Eastern Front under the command of Col. Konstantin Timofeevich Ilin, provisionally designated by this number according to some documents. It was only partly formed when the formation was abandoned on December 25. The divisional headquarters, now under Col. Fyodor Ivanovich Komarov, continued to exist until January 7, 1942, when it too was disbanded. Finally on January 14 the remaining troops and equipment of the abandoned formation were incorporated into the 422nd Rifle Division which was also forming in the Far East.

== 2nd Formation ==
On the same day a new 397th began forming in the Volga Military District in the Saratov Oblast at Atkarsk. Its order of battle, based on the first wartime shtat (table of organization and equipment) for rifle divisions, was as follows:

- 446th Rifle Regiment
- 447th Rifle Regiment
- 448th Rifle Regiment
- 1015th Artillery Regiment
- 26th Antitank Battalion
- 151st Antiaircraft Battery (to February 28, 1943)
- 189th Mortar Battalion (to November 15, 1942)
- 545th Reconnaissance Company
- 703rd Sapper Battalion
- 903rd Signal Battalion (later 903rd Signal Company)
- 510th Medical/Sanitation Battalion
- 560th Chemical Protection (Anti-gas) Company
- 555th Motor Transport Company
- 477th Field Bakery
- 989th Divisional Veterinary Hospital
- 1658th Field Postal Station
- 1007th Field Office of the State Bank

Col. Rodion Nikanorovich Shabalin was appointed to command on the day the division re-formed but he was replaced on January 27 by Colonel Ilin. It remained in the Volga region until March when it was moved to Kalinin Front's 3rd Shock Army in the Toropets salient. Within weeks it was reassigned, along with the 391st Rifle Division, to 1st Shock Army in Northwestern Front in the Demyansk region, just as the German 16th Army was opening the Ramushevo corridor to the encircled II Army Corps.

=== Demyansk Campaign ===
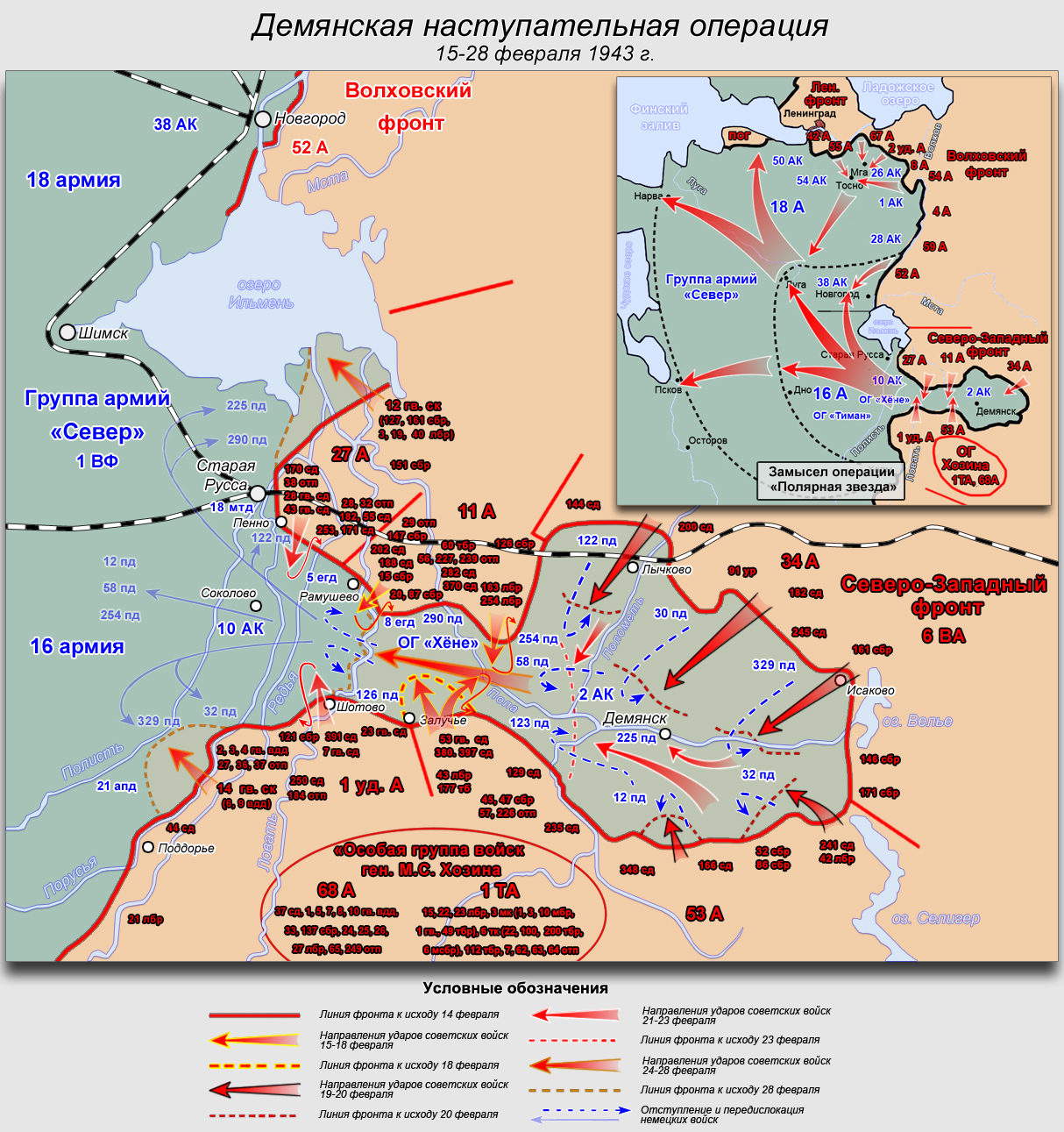
Soviet positions at Demyansk, spring 1943. The 397th was on the left flank of 53rd Army to the south of the Ramushevo corridor.

1st Shock Army was located on the south side of the corridor and in July, August and September launched three unsuccessful attempts to link up with 11th Army to the north and cut land communications to the Demyansk grouping. The division played a largely supporting role in these attacks as 1st Shock relied on its 1st Guards Rifle Corps to carry out the actual assaults. A further attack on November 28 fared no better. On October 11 Colonel Ilin had handed his command to Col. Viktor Aleksandrovich Vasilev, but he was in turn replaced by Col. Boleslav Albinovich Kenevich on November 12.

The turn of the 397th came in the first days of January, 1943. It formed a shock group with the 129th Rifle Division and the 177th Tank Brigade which succeeded in making a penetration of the German lines near Tsemena. However units of II Corps immediately counterattacked and surrounded the bulk of this force, including two of the division's regiments:

"Summarizing the second stage of the operation, the forces of the 129th and 397th Rifle Divisions and 177th Tank Brigade succeeded in wedging 2-3 kilometres into the enemy's defenses on a narrow sector. However, from 3 to 6 January, groups of enemy forces succeeded in cutting off some of these forces by conducting counterattacks at night against the flanks of the penetrating units. During the first half of January the army devoted its efforts to rescuing... the 397th Rifle Division's 447th and 448th Rifle Regiments... which were encircled in the small woods 1.5 kilometres southwest of Tsemena. The encircled group, which was commanded by Lieutenant Colonel P. G. Saenko, the commander of the 448th Rifle Regiment, fought selflessly for 18 days, while experiencing critical shortages of ammunition and food. Senior Lieutenant Golovin, a deputy battalion commander in the... 447th Regiment, became one of the heroes of this epic. After the death of his battalion commander he assumed command. On 2–3 January alone, his battalion repelled 16 enemy attacks, and Golovin himself is reported to have killed 37 Germans, for which he later received the Order of Lenin. On the night of 20 January, Major P. I. Iakovenko, Saenko's assistant, who had taken command of the group after his commander perished, led 140 soldiers, 122 of which were either wounded or sick, out of the encirclement."

Despite this heroism and endurance, with two regiments reduced to just handfuls of men, the division would not be combat capable until after a substantial rebuilding.

In the wake of Operation Iskra, which broke the German land blockade of Leningrad in the same month, Marshal G. K. Zhukov conceived a plan to encircle and destroy Army Group North: Operation Polyarnaya Zvezda. The first phase of the overall operation would be another attempt to cut off and eliminate the Demyansk salient. Zhukov finalized his plan during the week preceding the planned attack date of February 15. During a conference on February 10, he directed the commander of 1st Shock to transfer the forces of his right wing, including the 397th, and their tactical sectors to the adjacent 53rd Army However, in light of the encirclement and upcoming surrender of 6th Army at Stalingrad, on January 31 Hitler had authorized the evacuation of II Corps. Operation Ziethen began on February 17 before the delayed Soviet attack could get underway, and effectively short-circuited Zhukov's entire plan. Soviet ski troops of 34th and 53rd Armies were used to harass the retreating German units but they were unable to inflict any serious harm. Demyansk was abandoned on February 21 and by five days later most of the corridor was evacuated as well.

=== Move to the South and Summer Offensive ===
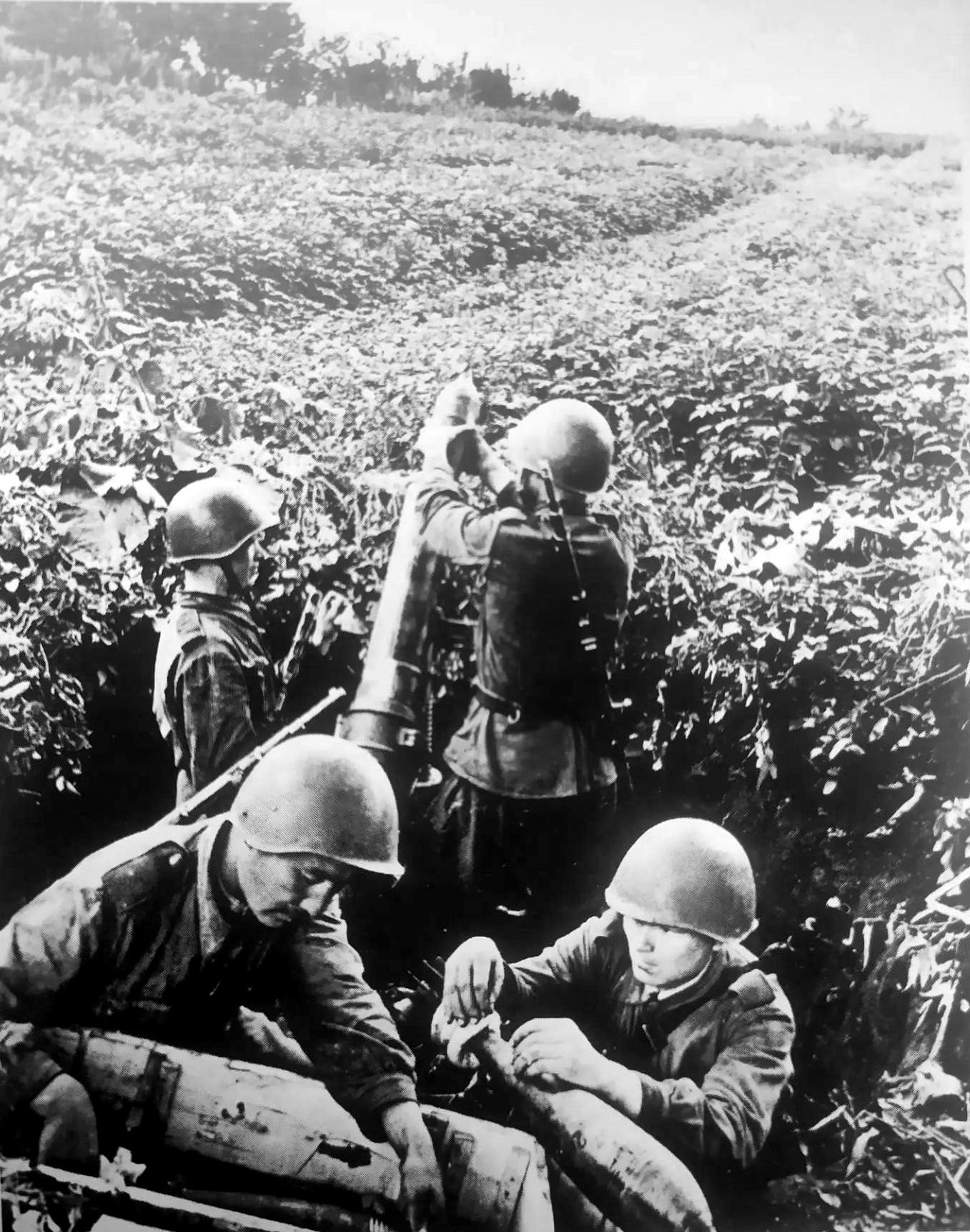
The 120 mm mortar crew of 448th Rifle Regiment Sergeant Daniil Savelyevich Nichipurenko at positions near Oryol, mid-1943

In March the 387th was moved to the Reserve of the Supreme High Command for much needed rebuilding. On March 13 it was assigned to the 2nd Reserve Army, which was to be re-stationed in the Yelets, Lipetsk and Lebedyan regions. This was soon activated as the 63rd Army. In April this Army was assigned to Bryansk Front. Following the German offensive at Kursk the 397th, along with the rest of 63rd Army, took part in Operation Kutuzov, the Soviet offensive against the German forces in the Oryol salient north of Kursk. In September the division was assigned to the 35th Rifle Corps, still in 63rd Army. By this time, after over a month of the summer offensive, the division's rifle regiments had been reduced to only two rifle battalions each. However each regiment also maintained most of the regimental support elements. For example, the 448th Regiment, with two rifle battalions, also had one sub-machinegun company, reconnaissance and sapper platoons, one battery of 4 76mm infantry guns, one battery of 3 45mm antitank guns and a mortar battery of 6 120mm mortars. Late in that month the lead elements of the Army fought their way toward the Sozh River north of Gomel and established some small bridgeheads between October 1–3, including one at Vetka captured by 35th Corps from the German 253rd Infantry Division. On October 10 Bryansk Front was disbanded and 63rd Army was transferred to Central (later Belorussian) Front; the 379th left 35th Corps by the end of the month, becoming a separate division under Army command.

== Into Belarus ==
In November the division returned to 35th Corps, but in December it was moved to the 77th Rifle Corps of 13th Army in the 1st Ukrainian Front. In early January, 1944 it took part in an offensive that liberated the city of Sarny, and was awarded an honorific:

"SARNY... 397th Rifle Division (Col. Andonev, Nikolai Fedorovich)... The troops who participated in the liberation of Sarny, by the order of the Supreme High Command of January 12, 1944, and a commendation in Moscow, are given a salute of 12 artillery salvoes from 124 guns."

Officially Colonel Andonev did not replace Colonel Kenevich until January 15. Andonev would remain in command for the duration of the war, being promoted to major general on April 20, 1945, while Kenevich would go on to serve prominently in the Polish People's Army.

On February 25 the 77th Corps left 13th Army for the 47th Army in the new 2nd Belorussian Front. In April the division was reassigned to 61st Army in 1st Belorussian Front as a separate division, and it would remain in that Army for the duration of the war. 61st Army was part of the Front's western group of armies, facing the German 2nd Army along the southern fringes of the Pripyat Marshes, and did not play an active role in the first phase of the summer offensive, Operation Bagration, acting as a follow-on force as the Germans retreated.

Before dawn on June 29 the Dniepr Flotilla's 2nd Brigade of river cutters landed forces of the 55th Rifle Division across the Pripyat River. Its bridgehead was broadened by the 23rd Rifle Division in subsequent landings. On July 3 the 397th, 415th and 212th Rifle Divisions attacked in support, but were unsuccessful. The Army's offensive on the Pinsk axis resumed on July 4 supported by several partisan detachments, fortified regions and the 55th Guards Rifle Division of 28th Army and began rolling up the German defenses along the northern bank of the Pripyat, Goryn and Styr rivers. In danger of encirclement, the German grouping was falling back to the west before the Army's right flank and center but was otherwise stubbornly defending the approaches to Luninets and Pinsk. By the end of July 9 the Army had advanced 85 km in five days and had reached the approaches to Luninets. On the same day the Dniepr Flotilla ferried a battalion of the 397th over the Pripyat while the remainder of the division massed in the Bereztse area, preparing to break through to Pinsk.

The Flotilla landed the main force of the division across the river on the night of July 10, and then delivered one battalion, as well as a regiment of the 415th Division, to the eastern outskirts of Pinsk on July 12/13. The city had been well fortified with full trenches, pillboxes and engineering obstacles. The outer line was held by the 216th Divisional Group and three worker battalions while the city itself was occupied by remnants of the 35th Infantry Division and the 17th Special Designation Brigade. On the night of July 13/14 the Army made a turning maneuver to attack the city from the north, south and east, with the help of the Dniepr Flotilla, and crushed German resistance, clearing the center by 0600 hours. By the end of July 16 it reached the line Khomsk to Ogdemer to Zhuravok, resulting in an advance of another 60 km over four days. On July 23 the 397th was awarded the Order of the Red Banner for its role in the liberation of Pinsk, while the 446th (Col. Mikhail Mikhailovich Golubev) and 447th (Lt. Col. Andrei Timofeevich Makarov) Rifle Regiments were both granted its name as a battle honor. Shortly after this victory the entire 61st Army was moved to the Reserve of the Supreme High Command, where the division was assigned to the 89th Rifle Corps.

=== Baltic Campaign ===
61st Army returned to the front in September, now in the 3rd Baltic Front. As of the middle of the month the division was in the area of Aluksne in Latvia. By the beginning of October it had advanced westward past Valmiera in the direction of Riga. On October 31 the 397th was awarded the Order of Kutuzov, 2nd class, for its part in the liberation of that city. When the 3rd Baltic Front was disbanded on October 16, 61st Army had been transferred to 1st Baltic Front. On November 29 the commander of the 1st Belorussian Front received the following:

"By order of the Supreme Commander-in-Chief, the following are being transferred to you by railroad:... b) 61st Army, consisting of:... 89th Rifle Corps (23rd, 311th and 397th Rifle Divisions), along with reinforcements, service establishments and rear organs. The army will arrive approximately between 9 December and 1 January at the Lukow station."

A further directive on December 7 ordered that the personnel strength of the Army's nine rifle divisions be reinforced to 6,500 men each, as well as 900 horses.

== Into Poland and Germany ==
In the plan for the Vistula-Oder operation the 61st was one of three armies in the bridgehead over the Vistula at Magnuszew. Along with 8th Guards and 5th Shock Armies it attacked along a 17 km front in the general direction of Kutno. The 61st was supported by the artillery of 3rd Shock and 1st Polish Armies. The offensive began on January 14 with a reconnaissance-in-force by the Army's forward battalions following a 25-minute fire onslaught, but these were halted by German fire from a switch position behind the Pilica River. A two-hour artillery preparation and the commitment of the Army's main forces were required to overcome this resistance and as a result over the day it advanced only 2 to 4 km. Over the next three days the 61st, along with the 1st Polish, 47th and 2nd Guards Tank Armies, jointly liberated Warsaw.

On January 26 the commander of the Front, Marshal G. K. Zhukov, reported on his plans for developing the offensive and forcing the Oder River. 61st Army would attack in the direction of Nikosken, Schloppe and Bernsee, with the objective of crossing the Oder after a week. In the event, although the river was reached, the crossing did not take place.

=== Berlin Offensive ===
In the buildup to the offensive on Berlin in April the 61st Army was deployed on the east bank of the Oder from Nipperwiese to Alt Rudnitz. The Army was to launch its main attack with its left flank, forcing the river along a 2.5 km sector from Hohenwutzow to Neuglitzen. The 397th was one of six divisions, including the rest of 89th Corps and the 9th Guards Rifle Corps, grouped along the axis of the main attack. Within its Corps, the division was in the first echelon with the 311th, while the 23rd Division was in second echelon. Although the main offensive began on April 16, 61st Army did not attack until the next day, when it won a bridgehead 3 km wide and up to 1,000m deep. By the 22nd the Army had cleared the Oder and Alte Oder and had turned its front completely to the north; three days later it had reached points 55 km west of the Oder. On April 29 it forced the Havel River in the area of Zehdenick against minimal resistance. Finally, on May 2, having advanced 60 km during the day against no resistance, reached the Elbe River in the area of Havelberg, and the next day met up with elements of the U.S. 84th Infantry Division near Gnefsdorf.

== Postwar ==
On May 28, in recognition of their contributions in the Battle of Berlin the 448th Rifle Regiment was decorated with the Order of Suvorov, 3rd class, while the 446th and 447th Regiments each received the Order of Kutuzov, 3rd class and the 1015th Artillery Regiment was awarded the Order of Aleksandr Nevski. According to Stavka Order No. 11095 of the following day, part 6, the 397th is listed as one of the rifle divisions to be "disbanded in place". It was disbanded in accordance with the directive in July 1945.
