= Operation Kutuzov =

Component of World War 2

- Part of the Eastern Front of World War II
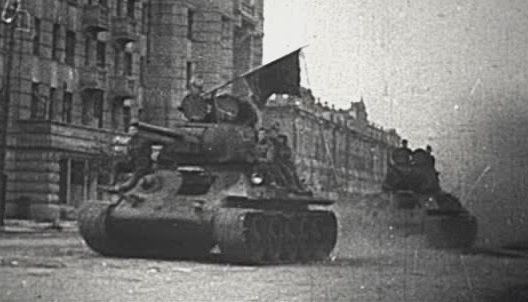
- Soviet T-34 tanks enter Orel, 1943
Date	12 July – 18 August 1943 (1 month and 6 days)
Location	Orel, Russian SFSR
Result	Soviet victory

Belligerents
Germany	Soviet Union

Commanders and leaders
(Nazi Germany) Walter Model (Nazi Germany) Lothar Rendulic (Nazi Germany) Günther von Kluge (Nazi Germany) Robert von Greim	(Soviet Union) Konstantin Rokossovsky (Soviet Union) Ivan Bagramyan (Soviet Union) Vasili Sokolovsky (Soviet Union) Markian Popov

Strength
300,700 men 625 tanks and assault guns 610 aircraft 5,500 guns	800,000 men 2,409 tanks and assault guns 2,220–3,023 aircraft 26,379 guns

Casualties and losses
86,454 men 14,215 killed 11,300 missing 60,939 wounded unknown tanks (Note: 343 tanks and assault guns were lost from 5 July till the beginning of August.) unknown guns 218 aircraft	429,890 men 112,529 dead or missing 317,361 wounded or sick 2,586 tanks destroyed 892 guns lost 1,014 aircraft destroyed

Operation Kutuzov was the first of the two counteroffensives launched by the Red Army as part of the Kursk Strategic Offensive Operation. It commenced on 12 July 1943, in the Central Russian Upland, against Army Group Center of the German Heer. The operation was named after General Mikhail Kutuzov, the Russian general credited with saving Russia from Napoleon during the French invasion of Russia in 1812. Operation Kutuzov was one of two large-scale Soviet operations launched as counteroffensives against Operation Citadel. The Operation began on 12 July and ended on 18 August 1943 with the capture of Orel and collapse of the Orel bulge.

== Background ==
As the end of the rasputitsa or rainy season approached, the Soviet command considered their next steps. Stalin strongly desired to seize the initiative and attack the German forces but was convinced by his senior commanders to take an initial defensive posture and allow the Germans to weaken themselves in attacking prepared positions. After this the Soviet forces would go over onto the offensive. Operation Kutuzov was the offensive plan for the Soviet forces before Moscow facing the German forces of Army Group Center. It was carried out by three Soviet Fronts or army groups: the Western Front, the Bryansk Front and the Central Front. The offensive was directed north of the Kursk area against the German 2nd Panzer Army, with the intention of cutting behind and trapping the German 9th Army then conducting offensive operations against the Kursk salient.

The Germans had spread their forces thin all across the front in an effort to provide as much men and material as possible for Operation Citadel. Holding the front before the Soviet offensive were the 2nd Panzer Army and elements of the 9th Army. The region had been held by German forces for nearly two years and despite Hitler's admonition not to build defensive works behind the front, some preparations had been made. A defensive line had been started that was 5–7 kilometres (3.1–4.3 mi) in depth, consisting of minefields, interconnected trench works, and strong points. Wherever possible, the Germans took advantage of terrain features such as streams, ravines and gullies but the positions were thinly held.

The Soviet high command planned two offensives as part of a large general offensive throughout the eastern front. Operation Kutuzov was the northern offensive (the other being the Donbas offensive south of Kursk), with its objective being to collapse the Orel salient, cut behind the 9th Army engaged in offensive operations at Kursk, encircle and annihilate it. In doing so they hoped to cause a general collapse of the German forces in the Soviet Union. The attack was to begin once the German panzer units engaged in Operation Citadel were locked into combat and weakened by their offensive at Kursk. The initial attack was to be made simultaneously on the northern and eastern faces of the Orel salient, with the Central Front along the southern face of the salient joining in as well, once the German offensive had been stopped.

German intelligence had revealed the Soviet forces massing opposite the 2nd Panzer Army and these had caused great concern to Kluge and Model. The Soviet armies earmarked for the operation had amassed a force of 1,286,000 men and 2,400 tanks. These were supported by 26,400 guns and 3,000 aircraft.

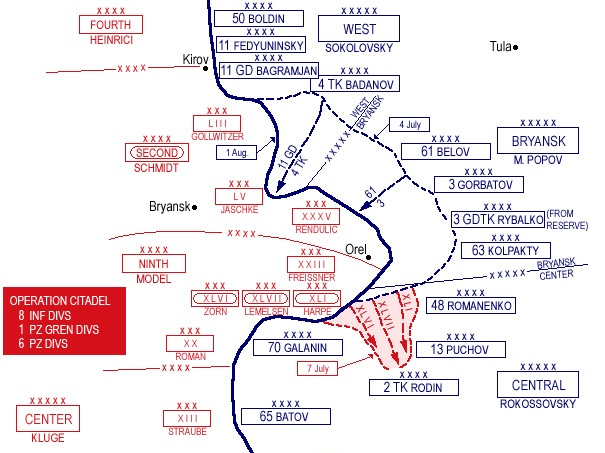
Map of Operation Kutuzov

The Soviet offensive was aided by partisan attacks behind the German lines. Approximately 100,000 Soviet partisans (according to Soviet reports) were working to disrupt German efforts to supply and reinforce their forces. German movements of ammunition and reinforcements were hampered throughout the operation by attacks on German communications and supply routes, especially railway lines. The partisans operated under the guidance of the Red Army.

== Offensive ==
On 12 July, a heavy artillery barrage marked the launching of the offensive. The armies of the Bryansk Front and the Western Front attacked along the north and north-east flanks of the 2nd Panzer Army. The Western Front assault was led by the 11th Guards Army under Lieutenant General Hovhannes Bagramyan, supported by the 1st and 5th Tank Corps. The Soviets attacked with overwhelming numbers. Along one 16-kilometre (9.9 mi) attack sector near Ulianovo, six Soviet rifle divisions attacked two German infantry regiments. At 5–7 kilometres (3.1–4.3 mi) in depth, the German defensive lines were deeper than the Soviets expected. The Soviet spearheads sustained heavy casualties but pushed through and in some areas achieved significant penetration. The defenders were overwhelmed by the afternoon of the first day, with the 11th Guards Army advancing some 23 kilometres (14 mi). The German 5th Panzer Division attempted to fill the breach but they were met by the Soviet supporting armour and were forced back.

The initial attacks on the eastern face by the Bryansk Front were less successful. The 61st, 3rd, and 63rd armies advanced 8, 14 and 15 kilometres (5.0, 8.7 and 9.3 mi) respectively. The following day the German LIII Army Corps counter-attacked and brought the Bryansk Front to a halt. The open terrain favored the longer ranged guns of the Germans. Kluge and Model had anticipated the Soviet attack and were quick to transfer units from the Kursk area to reinforce the defenders. Their timely arrival helped check the Soviet advance.

Farther north the 11th Guards Army was forcing its way through the German defences. The Germans lacked the reserves to block these penetrations. With the danger of a breakthrough and subsequent encirclement of their forces, the situation soon became serious for the 2nd Panzer Army. Army Group Centre transferred command of the 2nd Panzer Army to Model by the end of the second day. As Model was already commanding the German 9th Army making the north portion of the Kursk attack, the command transfer meant he was now in command of all German units in the Orel area.

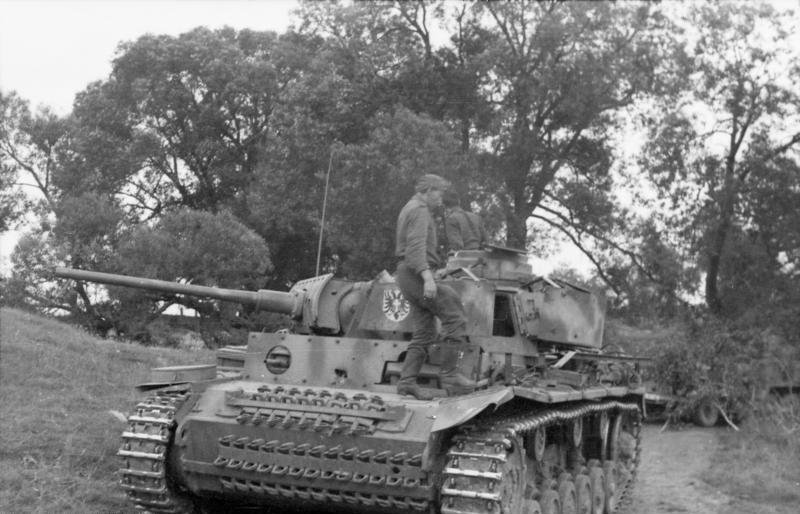
A Panzer III of the 2nd Panzer Division near Orel

Three days later the second phase of Operation Kutuzov was initiated, with attacks on the German 9th Army by several Soviet armies. The total Soviet troops now engaged in Operation Kutuzov numbered 1,286,049 men supported by 2,409 tanks and 26,379 guns. The Soviets broadened the offensive, adding supporting attacks by the 50th Army to the north of the 11th Guards Army. Between the 50th Army and the Bryansk Front was a thrust by the 20th Tank Corps aimed at Bolkhov, along with a push by the Central Front on the south face. To increase the momentum of the attack the Soviets now committed the 3rd Guards Tank Army and 4th Tank Army from the reserves. The 3rd Guards drove straight for Orel, attempting to develop the eastern attack, while the 4th Tank Army drove from the north along the wider breach made by 11th Guards Army. In doing so they threatened to trap the German forces defending the east face of the Orel salient. German defensive efforts were hampered by partisan attacks to their communications and rail supply lines.

As Soviet breakthroughs developed the situation for the Germans became serious. The entire 9th Army was threatened with being cut off. Model sent nearly all of his Panzer units to aid the 2nd Panzer Army, whose northern front was about to collapse, while to the north the 4th Army sent down the 253rd Infantry Division. The Germans achieved a temporary stabilization of the front while the 9th Army began to withdraw from their captured ground. The Soviet Central Front followed them hesitantly at first but increased the intensity of their attacks from the ground and the air. On 18 July the 9th Army was back at its starting points of 5 July.

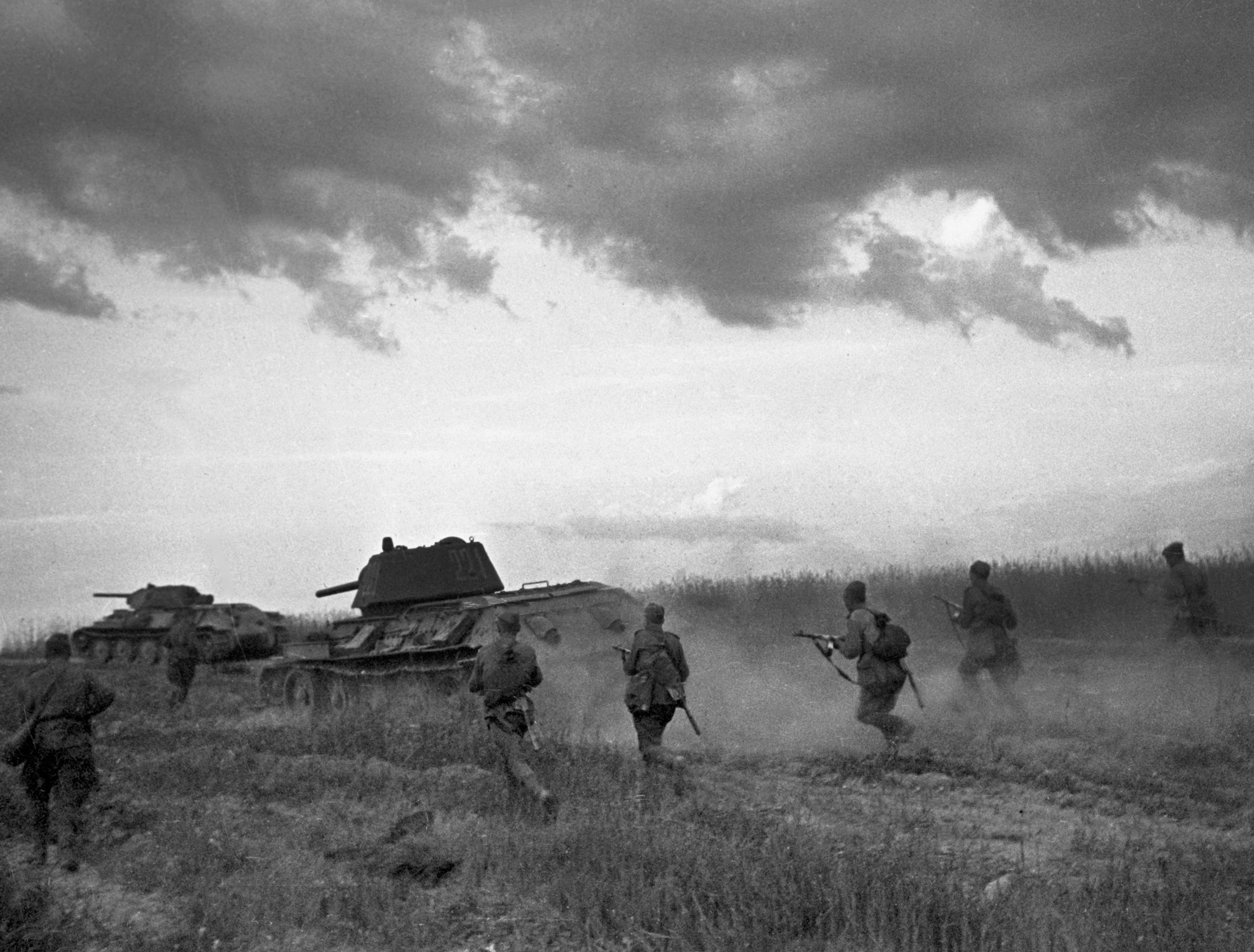
Soviet soldiers follow T-34s near Bryansk

A series of engagements developed in the Orel salient between arriving German reserves and Soviet tank formations. Though Hitler forbade retreat, the Soviets gradually gained ground. By 26 July the German troops were forced to desert the Orel base of operations and begin a withdrawal to the Hagen position to the east of Bryansk. With the 11th Guards reaching the outskirts of Karachev, midway between Orel and Bryansk, they threatened to cut the main rail line which was the main route of supply. On 29 July Bolkhov was liberated, and on 4 August the struggle for Orel commenced. After one day of hard fighting Orel was taken. With their position untenable, the Germans were forced to evacuate back to prepared positions at the Hagen line. By 18 August Soviet troops had reached the Hagen line east of Bryansk at the base of the Orel salient. With the German defeat the counter-offensive began to grow into a general Soviet offensive.

== Contest for air superiority ==
The Soviet Air Forces supported the attack on German ground positions in conjunction with the preliminary artillery bombardment. The 1st Air Army and 15th Air Army performed 360 sorties against German rear areas, dropping some 210 long tons (210 t) of bombs.

In the Southern sector of the bulge, the Germans logged over 1,000 missions on the first day, countered by the 737 missions of the 15th Air Army. The Luftwaffe destroyed some 35 tanks, 14 guns and 50 motor vehicles of the Bryansk Front, slowing their progress. By the end of the first day the Soviets had failed to breach the first line. While the 2nd Panzer Army was gradually being forced back, the Luftwaffe battled the VVS, destroying 94 Soviet aircraft on 13 July, including 50 Sturmoviks.

In the southern region of the battle the Luftwaffe's 1. Flieger-Division maintained air superiority in defense of the German 9th Army, dealing the Soviets some significant losses in aircraft between 13 and 16 July. After six days of heavy fighting the strength of the Luftwaffe began to wane. The 1. Flieger-Division flew 74 intercept missions against the 868 sorties conducted by the 16th Air Army. Though the Soviets continued to lose in tactical air engagements, their overall presence in the air was dominant. The VVS helped the 11th Guards Army achieve their breakthrough.

The VVS flew 60,995 sorties and dropped 15,000 tonnes of bombs in support of Kutuzov, while the German 1. Flieger-Division flew 37,421 sorties and dropped over 20,000 tonnes of bombs on Soviet targets.

== Aftermath ==
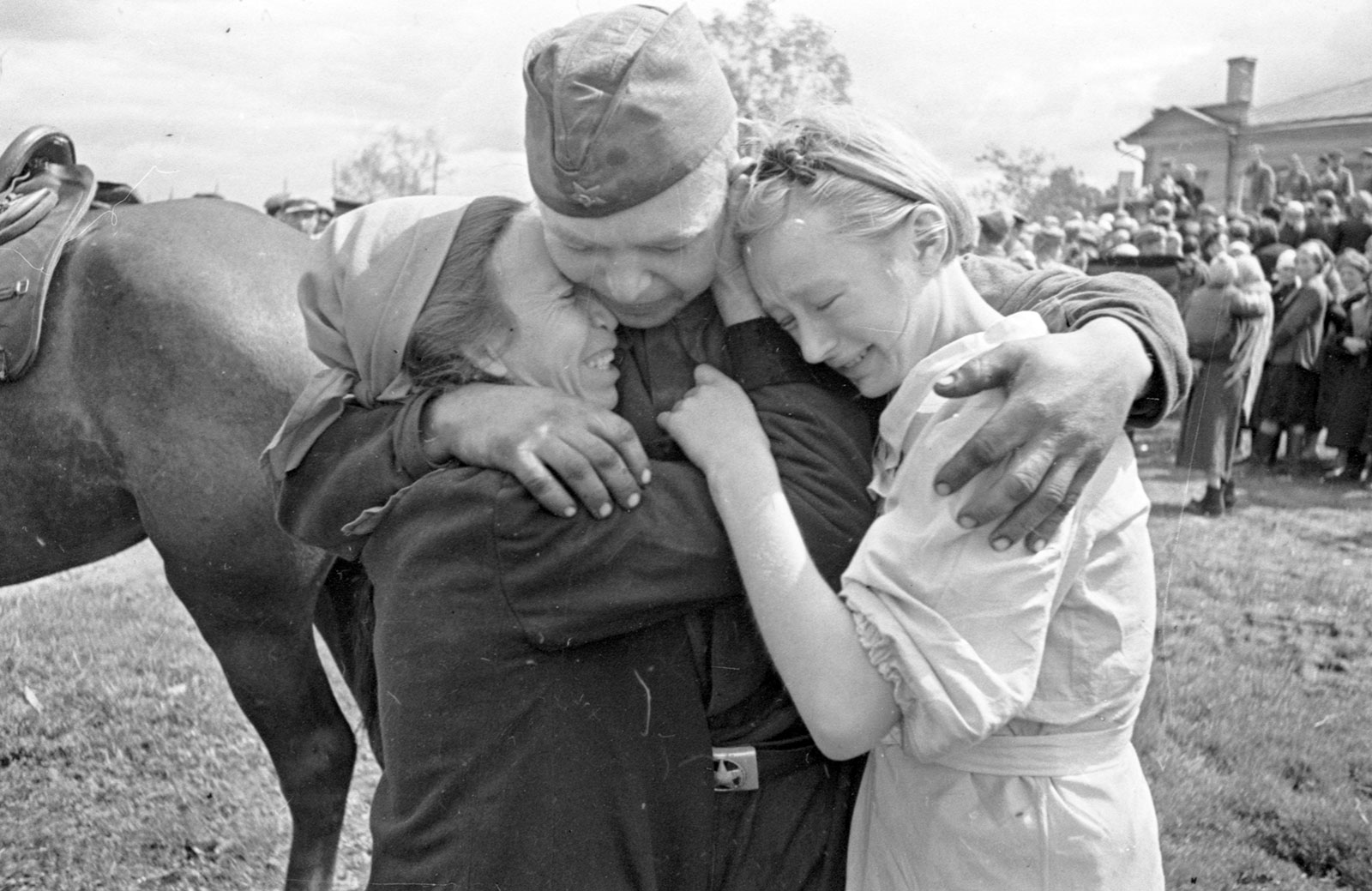
Red Army private Aleksandr Ivanovich Shirobokov of the 17th Anti-Aircraft Artillery Division embraces his sisters during the liberation of Karachev – their parents were shot by the Germans during the occupation.

The battle was the bloodiest of the three major operations during the Battle of Kursk. Overall German losses suffered during the battle were 86,454 men KIA, MIA or WIA. Casualties for the Red Army were 112,529 men killed, with a further 317,361 wounded. Tank and assault gun losses for the Red Army were particularly high, with 2,586 vehicles destroyed or damaged during Kutuzov. German tank losses are not available for this battle but Army Group Center is known to have lost 343 armoured fighting vehicles during both Citadel and Kutuzov.

Some of the Soviet commanders were displeased with the results, complaining that an even greater victory might have been won. Said Marshal Rokossovsky: "Instead of encircling the enemy, we only pushed them out of the bulge. The operation would have been different if we had used our force for two heavy punches which met at Bryansk". Zhukov held a similar opinion. Operation Kutuzov was successful in diverting German reserves earmarked for Operation Citadel and the Soviets reduced the Orel salient and inflicted substantial losses on the German army. The Soviet victory set the stage for the battle of Smolensk several weeks later. With Operation Kutuzov, the Soviets seized the strategic initiative, which they would hold through the remainder of the war.

== Bibliography ==
- Beevor, Antony (2012). The Second World War. New York: Back Bay Books. ISBN 978-0-316-02374-0.
- Bergström, Christer (2007). Kursk: The Air Battle: July 1943. Hinckley, United Kingdom: Chevron/Ian Allan. ISBN 978-1-903223-88-8.
- Frieser, Karl-Heinz; Schmider, Klaus; Schönherr, Klaus; Schreiber, Gerhard; Ungváry, Kristián; Wegner, Bernd (2007). Die Ostfront 1943/44 – Der Krieg im Osten und an den Nebenfronten [The Eastern Front 1943–1944: The War in the East and on the Neighbouring Fronts]. Das Deutsche Reich und der Zweite Weltkrieg [Germany and the Second World War] (in German). Vol. VIII. München: Deutsche Verlags-Anstalt. ISBN 978-3-421-06235-2.
- Hooton, E.R. (2016). War over the Steppes: The air campaigns on the Eastern Front 1941–45. Osprey. ISBN 978-1-47281562-0.
- Glantz, David. Soviet Military Deception in the Second World War. Routledge, 1989. ISBN 0-7146-3347-X
- Glantz, David M.; House, Jonathan (1995). When Titans Clashed: How the Red Army Stopped Hitler. Lawrence, Kansas: Kansas University Press. ISBN 978-0-7006-0899-7.
- Glantz, David M.; Orenstein, Harold S. (1999). The Battle for Kursk 1943: The Soviet General Staff Study. London: Frank Cass. ISBN 0-7146-4933-3.
- Krivosheev, Grigoriy (1997). Soviet Casualties and Combat Losses in the Twentieth Century. London: Greenhill Books. ISBN 1-85367-280-7.
- Nipe, George (2011). Blood, steel, & myth : the II. SS-Panzer-Korps and the road to Prochorowka, July 1943. Southbury, Connecticut: Newbury. ISBN 978-0-9748389-4-6.
- Willmott, H.P. and Robin Cross, Charles Messenger et al. World War II. New York, NY: Dorling Kindersley, 2004. ISBN 1-4053-1262-9
