= 3rd Army (Soviet Union) =

- 3-я армия
- Active: 1939–1945; 1946–1947
- Country: Soviet Union
- Branch: Red Army (later Soviet Army)
- Type: Combined arms
- Size: Field army two or more Rifle corps
- Engagements: Battle of Kursk; East Prussian Offensive; Battle of Berlin others

Commanders
- Notable commanders: Vasily Kuznetsov; Alexander Gorbatov

The 3rd Army (Russian: 3-я армия) was a field army of the Red Army during World War II.

== Polish Campaign ==
The 3rd Army was formed on 15 September 1939 from the Vitebsk Group of Forces, part of the Belorussian Front, which had been formed four days earlier from the Belorussian Special Military District for the Soviet invasion of Poland. The army was commanded by Komkor Vasily Kuznetsov. It included the 4th Rifle Corps with the 50th and 27th Rifle Divisions, in addition to the 5th Rifle Division, the 24th Cavalry Division, and the 22nd and 25th Tank Brigades. The units numbered 121,968 men and fielded 752 guns and 743 tanks on 17 September.

The 3rd Army saw its first action in September 1939, taking part in the operation in Belarus and Poland. The invasion was conducted under the terms of the Molotov–Ribbentrop Pact, which divided Poland between the Soviet Union and Nazi Germany and guaranteed that neither country would attack the other.

Order of Battle on 2 October 1939:

- 10th Rifle Corps
  - 5th Rifle Division
  - 50th Rifle Division
  - 115th Rifle Division
- 3rd Rifle Corps
  - 139th Rifle Division
  - 150th Rifle Division
- 3rd Cavalry Corps
  - 7th Cavalry Division
  - 36th Cavalry Division
- 15th Tank Corps
- 25th Tank Brigade

== Eastern Front ==
After the start of Operation Barbarossa, it included three corps, including the 4th Rifle Corps (27th, 56th, and 85th Rifle Divisions), as well as the 21st Rifle Corps (17th, 24th, 37th and 50th Rifle Divisions) and 11th Mechanised Corps (29th and 33rd Tank Division and 204th Motorised Division).

The 3rd Army took part in the operations of the Western, Central, Bryansk Fronts during the defenses of Grodno, Lida, and Novogrudok.

The 3rd Army also took part in the Battle of Smolensk, where German troops captured the city in a difficult two-month campaign, and the Battle of Moscow, in which the Red Army's winter counter-attack led by Marshal Georgy Zhukov drove back Army Group Center over 70 miles (110 km) away from Moscow. During the second half of the Eastern Front, the 3rd Army took part in the Battle of Kursk, where numerically superior Soviet forces, using anti-tank defenses, defeated the German forces, thus stopping Operation Zitadelle and robbing the German Army of all hopes of victory on the Eastern Front. The 3rd Army took part in the Bryansk, Gomel–Rechitsa, and Rogachev-Zhlobin Offensives. During the final phases of the war, the 3rd Army took part in Operation Bagration, the East Prussian Offensive, and the advance into eastern Germany, where it participated in the Battle of Berlin.

On 1 May 1945, the 3rd Army consisted of the 35th Rifle Corps (250th, 290th, and 348th Rifle Divisions), 40th Rifle Corps (5th, 129th, and 169th Rifle Divisions), 41st Rifle Corps (120th Guards, 269th, and 283rd Rifle Divisions), 4th Corps Artillery Brigade, 44th Gun Artillery Brigade, 584th Anti-Tank Artillery Regiment, and other formations and units.

== Post-World War II ==
The army headquarters was withdrawn to the Byelorussian Soviet Socialist Republic, where it was reorganised in August 1945 as the short-lived Headquarters Belorussian-Lithuanian Military District. The Belorussian-Lithuanian Military District, according to a Czech internet source (Valka), existed 31 Dec 44 – 9 July 1945, whereupon it was succeeded by the Minsk Military District. By this time the army consisted of three Rifle Corps with nine rifle divisions. Later, all of them except the 120th Guards 'Rogachev' Rifle Division were disbanded.

The army was briefly reformed with headquarters at Slutsk when the Belorussian Military District was being reformed, under the command of Colonel General Nikolai Gusev from July 1946, but was again disbanded in March 1947.

== Commanders ==
- Vasily Kuznetsov (1 September 1939 – 25 August 1941)
- Yakov Kreizer (25 August – 13 December 1941)
- Pyotr Pshennikov (13–28 December 1941), killed in action
- Pavel Batov (28 December 1941 – 11 February 1942)
- Filipp Zhmachenko (11 February – 12 May 1942)
- Pavel Korzun (12 May 1942 – 26 June 1943)
- Alexander Gorbatov (27 June 1943 г. – 9 July 1945)

== Notes ==
=== Bibliography ===
- Feskov, V.I.; Golikov, V.I.; Kalashnikov, K.A.; Slugin, S.A. (2013). Вооруженные силы СССР после Второй Мировой войны: от Красной Армии к Советской [The Armed Forces of the USSR after World War II: From the Red Army to the Soviet: Part 1 Land Forces] (in Russian). Tomsk: Scientific and Technical Literature Publishing. ISBN 9785895035306.
- Meltyukhov, Mikhail (2001). Советско-польские войны. Военно-политическое противостояние 1918–1939 гг [Soviet–Polish War: Military and Political Confrontation 1918–1939] (in Russian). Moscow: Veche. ISBN 978-5-7838-0951-4.
