= 97th Rifle Division =

97th Rifle Division (February 1936 - December 27, 1941) 97th Rifle Division (December 8, 1941 - April 10, 1943) 97th Rifle Division (May 1, 1943 - 1946)
- Active: 1936–1946
- Country: Soviet Union
- Branch: Red Army
- Type: Infantry
- Size: Division
- Engagements: Soviet invasion of Poland; Winter War; Operation Barbarossa; Battle of Kiev (1941); Operation Kutuzov; Battle of Smolensk (1943); Dukhovshchina-Demidov Operation; Polotsk-Vitebsk Offensive; Operation Bagration; Vitebsk-Orsha Offensive; Minsk Offensive; Goldap-Gumbinnen Operation; Vistula-Oder Offensive; East Prussian Offensive; Heiligenbeil Pocket; Soviet invasion of Manchuria
- Decorations: Order of the Red Banner (3rd Formation); Order of Suvorov (3rd Formation); Order of Kutuzov (3rd Formation)
- Battle honours: Vitebsk (3rd Formation)

Commanders
- Notable commanders: Komdiv Yurii Vladimirovich Sablin; Kombrig Aleksandr Vasilevich Katkov; Maj. Gen. Gavriil Ignatovich Sherstyuk; Col. Nikita Mikhailovich Zakharov; Col. Fyodor Vasilievich Maltsev; Col. Aleksandr Aleksandrovich Shchennikov; Col. Denis Protasovich Podshivailov; Maj. Gen. Yakov Stepanovich Vorobyov; Maj. Gen. Pyotr Mikhailovich Davydov; Col. Boris Semyonovich Rakov; Col. Gavriil Alekseevich Bulanov; Col. Fyodor Fyodorovich Shishov; Col. Samuil Ilich Tsukarev; Maj. Gen. Aleksandr Konstantinovich Makarev

The 97th Rifle Division was thrice formed as an infantry division of the Red Army, first as part of the prewar buildup of forces. The first formation was based on the pre-September 1939 shtat (table of organization and equipment) and the division was initially intended to serve in the fortifications along the border with Poland in western Ukraine. Beginning on September 17, 1939, it took part in the invasion of eastern Poland and then was moved north to join the 7th Army and later the 13th Army on the Karelian Isthmus during the Winter War against Finland where it saw action in the latter part of the struggle. Following this it returned to western Ukraine where it was on the border at the time of the German invasion in June 1941. At considerable cost it was able to retreat to the Dniepr River south of Kiev during July and was still there as part of 26th Army when the Soviet forces in eastern Ukraine were largely surrounded and wiped out in September. The division was finally disbanded in late December.

Meanwhile, a new division was being formed in the Transbaikal Military District based on the shtat of December 6, 1941 which was soon renumbered as the second formation of the 97th. It was quickly assigned to the 16th Army in Western Front and saw limited action in the last stages of the winter counteroffensive west of Moscow before holding the line on this sector into the spring of 1943, making limited holding attacks against units of Army Group Center. The division performed well enough that it was redesignated as the 83rd Guards Rifle Division in April, about the time the 16th Army was renamed 11th Guards Army.

A third 97th Rifle Division was raised in late April 1943 in Bryansk Front under the shtat of December 10, 1942, based on a pair of rifle brigades. It was immediately assigned to 61st Army and saw limited action in the July offensive towards Oryol before being moved northward, becoming part of the 5th Guards Rifle Corps of 39th Army in Kalinin Front (soon 1st Baltic Front) and saw combat in the slow and bloody battles east and north of Vitebsk through the winter. Early during the summer offensive against Army Group Center, now as part of 5th Army, the 97th distinguished itself in the capture of that city and received its name as an honorific. It then took part in the advance through Lithuania, winning the Order of the Red Banner at Vilnius, and then into East Prussia, remaining in 5th Army of 3rd Belorussian Front, mostly in the 65th Rifle Corps. In April 1945 it was moved along with the rest of its Army to the far east where it took part in the invasion of Manchuria in August, winning further distinctions in the process. The division was disbanded in 1946.

== 1st Formation ==
The division began forming in February 1936 in the Kiev Military District. It was intended to serve in the fortified region along the Southern Bug River centered on Letychiv west of Vinnytsia (3rd Letichevsky fortified region). Once completed it had the following order of battle:

- 69th Rifle Regiment
- 136th Rifle Regiment
- 233rd Rifle Regiment
- 41st Artillery Regiment
- 98th Howitzer Artillery Regiment
- 87th Antitank Battalion
- 104th Antiaircraft Battalion
- 66th Reconnaissance Company
- 32nd Sapper Battalion
- 47th Signal Battalion
- 41st Medical/Sanitation Battalion
- 68th Chemical Defense (Anti-gas) Company
- 39th Motor Transport Company
- 51st Field Bakery
- 223rd Field Postal Station
- 402nd Field Office of the State Bank

The division was first commanded by Komdiv Yurii Vladimirovich Sablin, however this officer was arrested on September 25 and executed by firing squad in June of the following year. In August 1937 Col. Aleksandr Vasilevich Katkov took command of the division after serving as an instructor at the Frunze Military Academy and was promoted to the rank of Kombrig on November 4. In November 1938 Col. Gavriil Ignatovich Sherstyuk, who had been the division's deputy commander since March, took over command. This officer would lead the 97th into the invasion of Poland and the Winter War.

=== Invasion of Poland ===
When the Polish operation began on September 17, 1939, the division was in the 6th Army of Ukrainian Front, part of the 17th Rifle Corps along with the 96th Rifle Division and the 10th and 38th Tank Brigades. The invasion came as a complete surprise to the Polish Army and government which were in no position to offer effective resistance. Their broadcast orders to units in the path of the invasion were to withdraw to the borders of Hungary and Romania. 6th Army deployed with the task of advancing on Ternopil, Ezerna and Kozova by way of the Zbruch River bridge at Volochysk en route to Lvov. At 0430 hours the artillery of 17th Corps delivered an attack on the Polish firing points and within 30 minutes its troops began to cross without significant resistance. By about 0800 hours these formed into marching columns and began moving towards Ternopil. After overtaking the infantry the 10th Tank Brigade entered the city sometime past 1800. Meanwhile, the 24th Tank Brigade of the 2nd Cavalry Corps made a joint advance with the 136th Rifle Regiment north of Ternopil, passing Dobrovody at noon and reaching the western outskirts of the city at 2200 where they began clearing it of Polish units. Together the 97th and 96th Divisions took up to 600 Polish soldiers as prisoners during the day.

Over the following days the advance on Lvov continued; this included a forward detachment formed from elements of the two divisions which prepared for an assault on the city to begin at 0900 hours on September 21. During the previous two days there had been extensive three-way negotiations for control of the city as well as hostilities between the Soviet forces and the German 1st Mountain Division. The German forces withdrew overnight on September 20/21 and the forward detachment, supported by 38th Tanks, began to move into Lvov from the east at the planned time along with other formations of 6th Army when negotiations with the Polish command resumed. At 1400 hours on September 22 the Polish troops began to lay down their arms. The advance to the west continued during the following week and at 0900 hours on September 29 the 17th Corps reached Przemyśl and began receiving control of it from the German command. During the rest of the day the 6th Army deployed along the San River from Biłgoraj to Przemyśl. Over the following weeks as negotiations continued between the Soviet and German governments the Army would fall back to positions west of Lvov.

=== Winter War ===
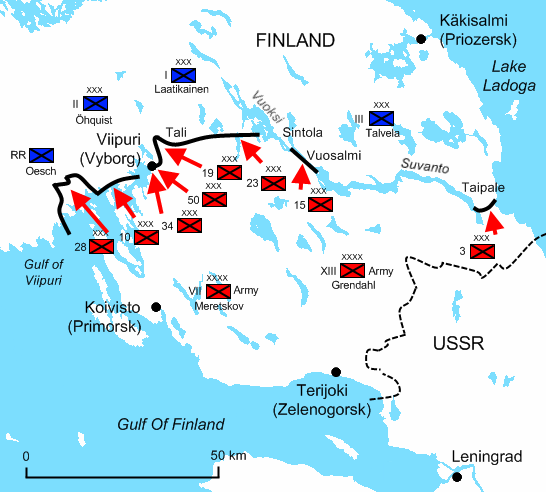
Karelian Isthmus March 13, 1940. Note position of 15th Rifle Corps.

Within a few months the 97th Division was transferred north to the Northwestern Front on the Karelian Isthmus where it was assigned to the new 13th Army when that force was split from 7th Army in January 1940. The division first joined the 23rd Rifle Corps before being transferred to the 15th Rifle Corps and remained in reserve until the fighting was renewed in February. The division and its Corps was deployed on the Army's left flank along the Vuoksi waterway. In the course of the fighting several soldiers of the 97th became Heroes of the Soviet Union, among them Sr. Lt. Spiridon Mikhailovich Egorov, a company commander of the 69th Rifle Regiment who distinguished himself in the capture of Vitsa-Saari island from February 25–28. He went on to study at the Frunze Military Academy in 1942 and served through the Great Patriotic War, reaching the rank of lieutenant colonel before moving to the reserve in 1947. He resided in Moscow before he died in December 1999.

Another soldier of the 97th who gained the Gold Star was Jr. Lt. Andrei Filippovich Zinin, a platoon commander of the 377th Tank Battalion, which was now part of the division's order of battle. On February 26, during fighting for the village of Kusa (now Klimovo in the Vyborgsky District), Zinin destroyed a Finnish bunker with five shots, setting it on fire, and killed or wounded three snipers in the process. When another tank of his platoon was immobilized with a broken track Zinin left his own vehicle to direct repairs under heavy fire. He went on to study at the Ulyanovsk Tank School in 1941 and eventually commanded a company of IS-2 tanks of the 57th Independent Heavy Tank Regiment; he would also take part in the Moscow Victory Parade of 1945. Zinin transferred to the reserve in 1961 with the rank of lieutenant colonel and died at Novotroitsk in April 1983.

Krasnoarmeets Ivan Timofeevich Artemiev was a machine gunner of the 69th Rifle Regiment. On March 12 he was with his unit on the island of Musti-Saari northeast of the city of Vyborg during what turned out to be the last hours of the war. With his fire he repelled several night attacks by the Finnish forces. When his machine gun ammunition ran out he resorted to grenades and in the course of the action killed or wounded as many as 30 Finnish officers and soldiers. Following the Winter War Artemiev transferred to the Red Air Force and became an air gunner but was shot down and killed near Vitebsk on June 26, 1944. All the division's HSU awards were proclaimed on April 7, 1940. On the previous day Sherstyuk, who had been promoted to the rank of Kombrig on February 1, had his rank modernized to that of major general

=== Operation Barbarossa ===
Following the Finnish War the division was returned to the Kiev Special Military District, where it took up positions much the same as after the Polish invasion. General Sherstyuk remained in command until January 15, 1941, when he was replaced by Col. Nikita Mikhailovich Zakharov; Sherstyuk would go on to briefly command the 38th Army in early 1942 before serving in various staff positions until 1949. On June 22, 1941, the 97th was part of the 6th Rifle Corps of 6th Army in the Kiev District, now renamed Southwestern Front, and was still under these commands on July 1.

At this time the division was noted as being well-armed but less well equipped with transport. It had a total of 10,050 officers and men armed with 7,754 rifles and carbines, 3,540 semi-automatic rifles, 401 sub-machine guns, 437 light machine guns, 174 heavy machine guns, 58 45mm antitank guns, 37 76mm cannons and howitzers, 37 122mm howitzers and 12 152mm howitzers and 151 mortars of all types. Transport consisted of 143 trucks, 78 tractors, and 2,535 horses. On June 23 it was attacked by German panzers north of Nemyriv. The division continued to hold its defensive positions west of Lvov for the first week of the invasion but this gallant stand just made it more vulnerable to encirclement by 1st Panzer Group. Colonel Zakharov is listed as having left command on June 27 and was not replaced until July 1 by Col. Fyodor Vasilievich Maltsev.

=== Battle of Kiev ===
By July 7 the depleted 6th Rifle Corps, which was now under direct command of the Front, was in retreat through Proskurov in the face of the advancing IV Army Corps of German 17th Army. Over the following week the 97th's retreat accelerated, reaching the Ros River east of Belaya Tserkov. The division survived the retreat in part because it was intermixed with elements of the 4th Mechanized Corps, and for a time Colonel Maltsev actually commanded the 8th and 202nd Motorized Rifle Regiments in addition to his own forces. In late July the 6th Corps was reassigned to the 26th Army, and by August 6 the 97th was being forced from its positions on the Ros by the 60th Motorized Division, falling back to the Dniepr west of Kanev by August 11.

As of the beginning of September the division was serving as a separate division in the 38th Army, still in Southwestern Front. It was on the Army's right flank on the east bank of the Dniepr, still holding the Kanev area. The 1st Panzer Army broke over the river at Kremenchug by September 10 with the goal of linking up with the 2nd Panzer Army well to the west of Kiev. Being cut off from 38th Army the 97th reverted to command of the 26th Army and began withdrawing eastward by September 15 but was soon trapped in a pocket west of Orzhytsia. The division was effectively annihilated there by September 23, although Colonel Maltsev survived the catastrophe and continued to lead the remnants of the division until it was finally officially disbanded on December 27.

== 2nd Formation ==
In early December a new rifle division, designated as the 456th, began forming at Ulan-Ude in the Transbaikal Military District; it would be renumbered as the 97th in January 1942. Its first commander, Col. Aleksandr Aleksandrovich Shchennikov, was assigned on December 8. Its order of battle remained the same as the 1st formation with the following exceptions: there was no howitzer regiment; the antiaircraft battalion was replaced by the 119th Antiaircraft Battery; the signal battalion was replaced by a signal company (it would later be reinstated as a battalion); there was a 139th Mortar Battalion (until October 22, 1942); the 920th Divisional Veterinary Hospital was added; and the following were renumbered -

- 455th Field Bakery
- 1664th Field Postal Station
- 1097th Field Office of the State Bank

The division had just a couple of months to organize and train before it began moving west by rail at the beginning of February. It had been assigned to the 16th Army in Western Front and had offloaded and formed up at Kaluga by March 5. The division would remain under these commands for the duration of the 2nd formation.

On March 17 Colonel Shchennikov was moved to the command of the 36th Rifle Brigade in the same Front and the division was taken over by Col. Denis Protasovich Podshivailov, who had previously commanded the 36th Guards Rifle Regiment of 12th Guards Rifle Division. Later that month the 97th liberated the town of Duminichi and reached the Zhizdra River before going over to the defensive. Colonel Podshivailov was assigned to study at the Voroshilov Academy on June 7 and he was replaced by Col. Yakov Stepanovich Vorobyov, who had previously commanded the 141st Rifle Division. In July the division took part in several holding attacks to pin down German forces of Army Group Center while the main Soviet and German offensives were being fought near Rzhev and in the Caucasus region. Vorobyov was promoted to the rank of major general on January 27, 1943. From February into April the 16th Army made a series of limited attacks similar to those in July of the previous year, including the forcing of the Zhizdra River line. While these did not take much ground they were successful enough that the 16th was redesignated as the 11th Guards Army and on April 10 the 97th became the 83rd Guards Rifle Division.

== 3rd Formation ==
A new 97th Rifle Division began forming in the last days of April 1943 in the 61st Army of Bryansk Front, based on the 108th and 110th Rifle Brigades.

=== 108th Rifle Brigade ===
The 108th started forming in the Moscow Military District in January 1942 but quickly came up to strength and by the end of May was assigned to the 9th Guards Rifle Corps in the reserves of Western Front. In June the Corps was assigned to 61st Army on the southern flank of Western Front. The brigade remained under these commands until February 1943 when 61st Army was shifted to Bryansk Front. On May 1 the 108th was combined with its "sister" 110th Rifle Brigade to form the new 97th Division.

=== 110th Rifle Brigade ===
The 110th was considered a "sister" to the 108th, also started forming in the Moscow Military District in January 1942 and followed an almost identical combat path, joining the 9th Guards Rifle Corps by the end of May in the reserves of Western Front. In June it was assigned along with its Corps to 61st Army of this Front and spent the rest of the year on this largely inactive sector. In February 1943 the front boundaries were changed and 61st Army came under Bryansk Front. On May 1 the 110th was combined with the 108th to form the new division.

=== Operation Kutuzov ===
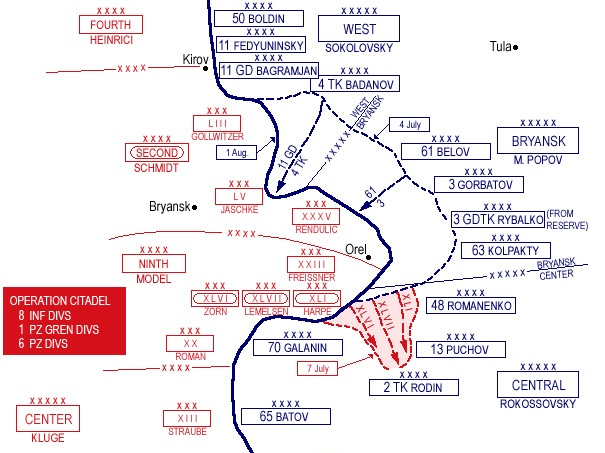
Operation Kutuzov. Note position of 61st Army.

Maj. Gen. Pyotr Mikhailovich Davydov, who had commanded the 108th Rifle Brigade since September 27, 1942, took command of the division on the day it officially formed. Its order of battle was as follows:

- 69th Rifle Regiment
- 136th Rifle Regiment
- 233rd Rifle Regiment
- 41st Artillery Regiment
- 87th Antitank Battalion
- 66th Reconnaissance Company
- 32nd Sapper Battalion
- 47th Signal Battalion (later 758th Signal Company)
- 41st Medical/Sanitation Battalion
- 68th Chemical Defense (Anti-gas) Company
- 360th Motor Transport Company
- 455th Field Bakery
- 920th Divisional Veterinary Hospital
- 1753rd Field Postal Station
- 1707th Field Office of the State Bank

As of July 1 the 97th was serving as a separate rifle division in 61st Army. Operation Kutuzov, the Soviet offensive against Army Group Center in the Oryol salient, began on July 12 when 61st and 11th Guards Army went over to the attack at 0505 hours following a reconnaissance-in-force the previous evening. The 9th Guards Corps, supported by armor and artillery, formed the 61st Army's shock group. By 0900 it had reached the northeastern outskirts of Palchikovo and by two hours later had taken Tolkachevo and began developing the offensive to the southwest. This advance, already up to 4 km deep, threatened the German-held salient around Bolkhov which covered Oryol from the north and German reserves were rushed in to counterattack. By the day's end the 97th, which had been committed to widening the breach (to about 12 km at this point), was attacking Palchikovo from the north.

As further reserves arrived the pace of the offensive began to slow on July 13. By the end of the day the division had occupied Palchikovo in cooperation with right-flank units of 9th Guards Corps. Over the following days the Army continued to develop the attack toward Bolkhov and by the end of July 17 the division had reached a line from Melshchino to the grove east of Morozovo. After defeating an attempted German counteroffensive the 61st Army resumed its own offensive on July 20. Two days later the 97th broke into the northeastern outskirts of Bolkhov while the 415th Rifle Division entered its southeastern outskirts and the 356th Rifle Division reached the town from the north. This led to a nearly week-long battle for the fortified town with several areas changing hands several times. A final effort by the German grouping to drive the 97th and 415th Divisions from the town on July 27 ended in failure and over the next two days Bolkhov was completely cleared. Immediately afterward the division was moved to the Reserve of the Supreme High Command. By the beginning of August it was assigned to 20th Army in the Reserve, but a month later it was in the reserves of Kalinin Front as part of the 1st Rifle Corps.

== Into Belarus ==
The 97th joined the 5th Guards Rifle Corps of 39th Army, still in Kalinin Front, in September as Operation Suvorov, the Soviet offensive on Smolensk, was underway. The Front had begun its part in the offensive on August 13 with an attack on the XXVII Army Corps 8 km northeast of Dukhovshchina. 39th Army renewed its assault with the 5th Guards Corps on August 25 but in five days this produced only a minor bulge in the German lines about 3 km wide and 1 km deep. Following a regrouping and replenishment the offensive resumed on September 14 and produced a wide gap south of Beresnevo. Dukhovshchina was finally liberated four days later.

During the fighting for Dukhovshchina Jr. Lt. Mikhail Filippovich Maskaev led a squad of his platoon of the 66th Reconnaissance Company behind German lines and into their trenches on the night of September 16/17. In the course of this operation he was severely concussed by the explosion of a shell and was evacuated to the rear. Earlier, on July 16 he had commanded his group into an attack on the headquarters of an infantry regiment which took nine prisoners and captured important documents. In another foray on July 22 he and his men raided the village of Shatskoye, capturing several prisoners, three horses and more documents. In recognition of these successes, on June 4, 1944, Maskaev would be made a Hero of the Soviet Union. On the same date, while leading his platoon in an operation which freed about eight thousand concentration camp prisoners he lost a leg in a mine explosion. After the war he lived in Biysk and ran several businesses before he died in 1984.

=== Advance on Vitebsk ===
General Davydov was removed from his command on September 22 and placed at the disposal of the military council of Kalinin Front. He was replaced on September 25 by Col. Boris Semyonovich Rakov. Following the liberation of Smolensk on September 25 Kalinin Front launched an offensive in the direction of Vitebsk. This began with an assault on the German positions at Rudnya, led by the 1st Penal Battalion and a mobile group from 43rd Army and followed by the 97th, 17th Guards and 19th Guards Rifle Divisions while the 9th Guards Division remained in second echelon. Rudnya was liberated on September 29.

As of November 1 the 97th had been reassigned to the 84th Rifle Corps, still in 39th Army. In early November, Army Gen. A. I. Yeryomenko, commander of the recently renamed 1st Baltic Front, ordered the 43rd and 39th Armies to concentrate north of the Smolensk - Vitebsk railroad and highway in order to renew the advance on the latter city, which had slowed significantly over the past weeks. The assault was to open on November 8 against the positions of the German 206th and 14th Infantry Divisions. Although the divisions of the two Soviet armies were worn down to about half strength from earlier fighting, they still held a five-fold advantage in infantry, as well as superiority in armor and artillery. The offensive began as planned and opened a gap on a 10 km front by the next day, and gained as much as 10 km in depth over 10 days of fighting, before the German forces were able to rebuild a continuous front.

By the start of December the 97th had returned to 5th Guards Corps, still in 39th Army. The Army, this time with 5th Guards Corps in the lead, began another joint offensive with 43rd Army on December 19, again striking the defenses of 14th Infantry east of Vitebsk, on the Borok - Goriane sector, backed by nearly 100 tanks. The attack made very limited gains, and 5th Guards Corps was withdrawn and sent south of the Smolensk - Vyasma road on December 21, with the entire offensive shut down two days later. This redeployment was made in order to reinforce a new assault by 33rd Army of Western Front on this sector, which began on December 23. However, by now the division had been detached again, now to the 45th Rifle Corps of 33rd Army. It entered battle on December 25 north of Bolshaya Vydreia and the Army continued pressing its attacks on January 1, 1944, within a deep salient southeast of Vitebsk. By January 3 the 97th was holding along the left shoulder of the salient and on January 6 the STAVKA ordered the offensive to shut down temporarily in the face of major snowstorms and determined German resistance. Meanwhile, on December 26 Colonel Rakov left command of the division and was not finally replaced by Col. Gavriil Alekseevich Bulanov until January 7.

Later that month the 45th Corps was transferred to 5th Army, still in Western Front, but the 97th was further reassigned to the 72nd Rifle Corps of that Army. The division would remain in 5th Army, commanded by Lt. Gen. N. I. Krylov, for the duration of the war. In late February the division reported a personnel strength of 3,717. By mid-March the 97th was deep within the salient south of Vitebsk and the Front planned for a new offensive in the direction of Bogushevsk. This effort began on March 21 and the 72nd Corps was designated as part of the Front's main shock group. The group was to assault the defenses of the 14th and 299th Infantry Divisions on a 12 km-wide sector between Makarova and Shugaevo. The intermediate goal was to reach the Sukhodrovka River line en route to the upper reaches of the Luchesa River. 72nd Corps deployed on the shock group's left wing with the 97th and 184th Rifle Divisions moving into the sector formerly held by the 157th Rifle Division and the 173rd Rifle Division held in second echelon. The 97th and 184th attacked on a 3.5 km-wide sector from west of Gory to Shugaevo at dawn following an intense artillery preparation. The weight of the assault collapsed the German defense and generally the first echelon advanced from 1 km - 4 km on the first day. The 97th crushed a salient south of Gory but the 184th was stopped cold at Shugaevo. Heavy fighting continued on March 22 but the Corps recorded no additional gains. The next day the Front committed its second-echelon divisions and in two days of continued combat the 72nd Corps managed to penetrate the defenses of the 14th Infantry, capture strongpoints at Sharki, Kuzmentsy and Efremenki, and advance as much as 1,000m toward Buraki. Early on March 24 the Front reinforced the Corps with the 251st Rifle Division which enabled it to capture a strongpoint at Diakovina and advance as much as 2 km before again grinding to a halt. Although fighting continued through March 29, by March 27 it was clear to both sides that the offensive had faltered with no prospect for revival since the Front had lost 20,630 men from March 21–30, including 4,029 killed and 12,855 wounded. Within two weeks Army Gen. V. D. Sokolovskii was removed from his command of Western Front and operations were suspended until the summer.

=== Vitebsk-Orsha Offensive ===
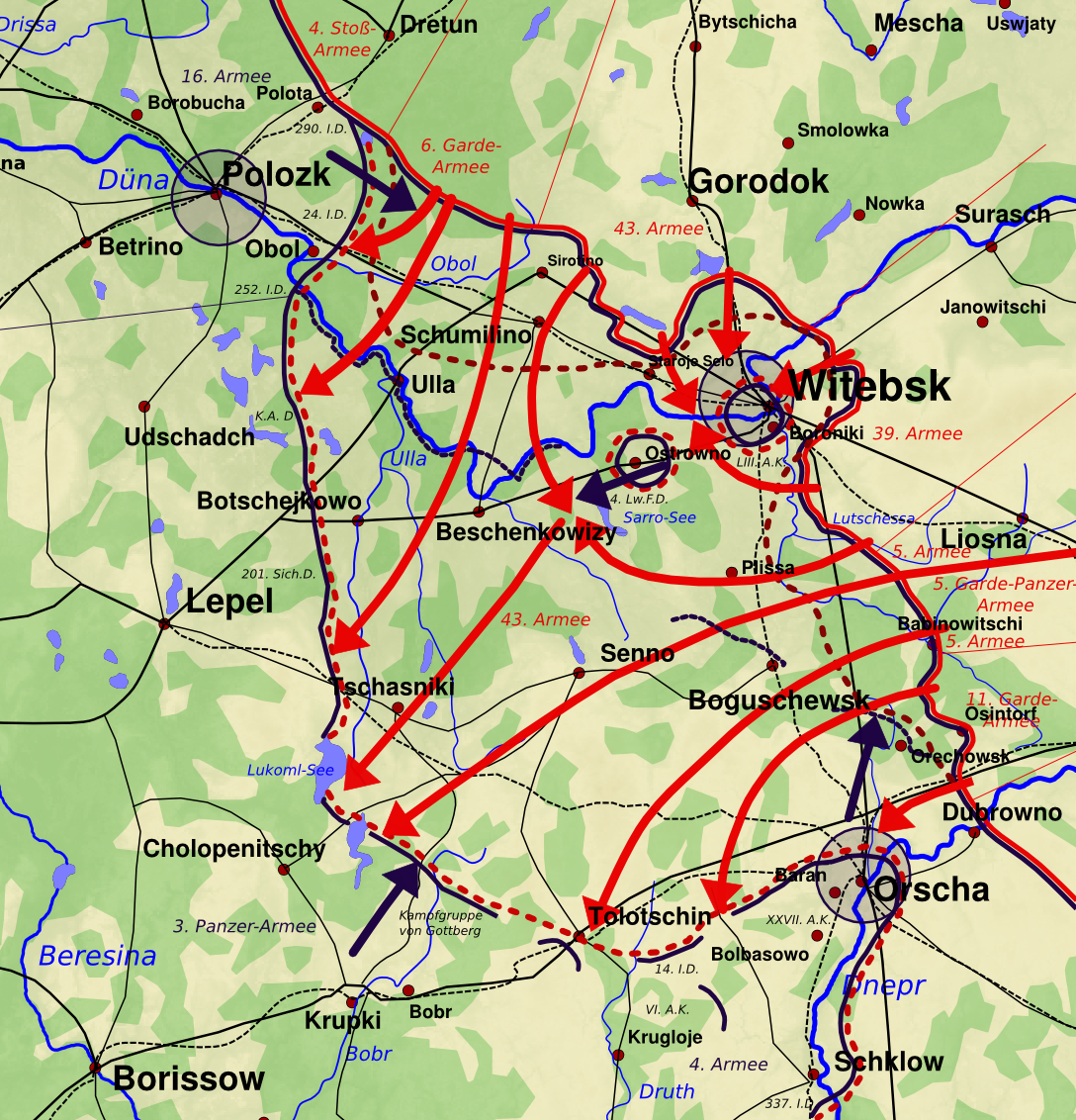
Vitebsk-Orsha Offensive.

On April 24 Western Front was split into the 2nd and 3rd Belorussian Fronts, with the 5th Army becoming part of the latter. Four days later, as part of the general shakeup of command, Colonel Bulanov was moved to the post of deputy commander of the 62nd Rifle Division and was replaced on May 4 by Col. Fyodor Fyodorovich Shishov. At this time the 97th was still in 72nd Rifle Corps, but by the beginning of June it had been transferred to the 65th Rifle Corps where it would remain for most of the duration.

In the planning for Operation Bagration the immediate objective of 5th Army was to encircle the forces of 3rd Panzer Army in Vitebsk from the south. The main attack on June 22 was preceded by a two-hour-and-twenty-minute artillery and air bombardment against the German 256th and 299th Infantry Divisions. When the attack went in the division was in the six in the Army's first echelon. This lead element of 65th Corps had the 2nd Guards Tank Brigade, plus the 395th Guards Heavy (ISU-152s) and the 343rd Guards (ISU-122s) Self-Propelled Artillery Regiments in support. Altogether the 65th and 72nd Rifle Corps hammered 18 km of the German line on the Chernitsa River. 65th Corps faced two regiments of the 299th Division, and by the afternoon the 97th, flanked by the 371st Rifle Division, had gained 2.5 km, driving through the center of the German VI Army Corps' position and reaching the second zone of defense. By day's end they had advanced as much as 4 km and established bridgeheads across the Sukhodrovka River, which was bridged overnight.

The advance continued the next day, assisted by heavy artillery and air attacks. By 1300 hours, despite the arrival of German reinforcements, elements of 5th Army had crossed the rail line to Orsha. On the 24th the 97th and the 371st Divisions continued their attack and broke through the third German position, advancing a further 10 km. VI Corps was completely broken this day, with part of its remnants falling back to Bogushevsk, although that town was also cleared by noon the next day, during which 5th Army advanced another 20 km. Overnight on June 25/26 the Vitebsk salient was finally encircled, and the first Soviet troops crossed the Dvina and entered the city. By this time the 65th Corps was advancing well to the west in the direction of Cherekhya, but the division was recognized for its role in the long and bloody fighting as follows:

VITEBSK... 97th Rifle Division (Col. Shishov, Fyodor Fyodorovich)... The troops who participated in the liberation of Vitebsk, by the order of the Supreme High Command of June 26, 1944, and a commendation in Moscow, are given a salute of 20 artillery salvoes from 224 guns.

The 136th Rifle Regiment (Maj. Khamydulin, Sabit Rakhmeevich) was awarded the same honorific by the same decree.

=== Minsk Offensive ===
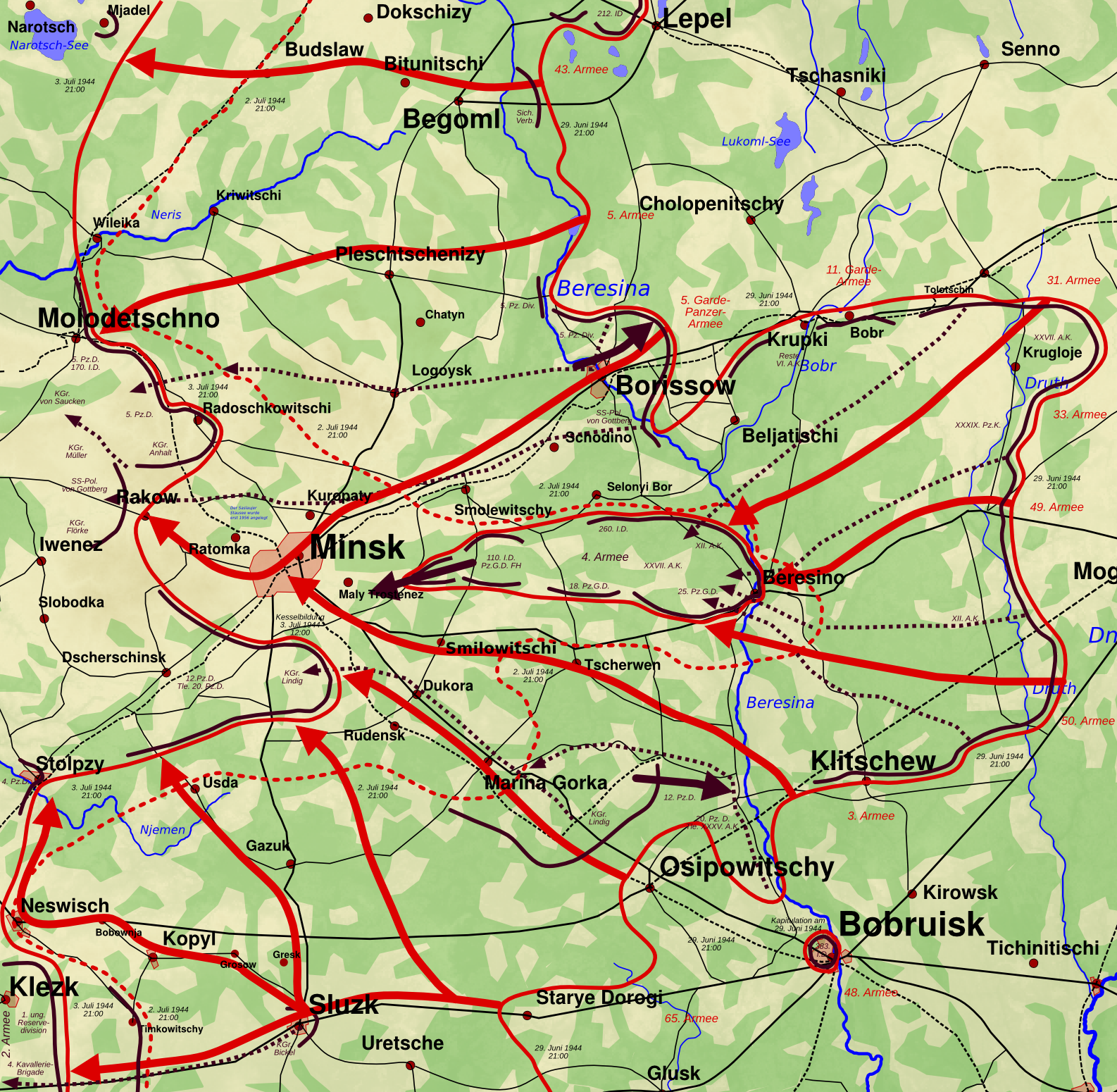
Minsk Offensive

During the night and morning of June 30 the 65th and 72nd Corps crossed over to the western bank of the Berezina River north of Borisov. During the day they advanced another 10 km - 14 km and roughly the same distance on July 1. Minsk was largely liberated on July 3 as the 97th advanced with its Corps on the Molodechno axis. On the same day Colonel Shishov was reassigned to deputy command of the 159th Rifle Division; he would die of wounds sustained in a mine explosion near Kaunas on August 5. He was replaced in command of the 97th on July 4 by Col. Fyodor Khristoforovich Zhekov-Bogatyrev but this officer in turn would be replaced on August 22 by Col. Samuil Ilich Tsukarev who had been in temporary command of the 371st Division.

By July 6 the 5th Army had reached and forced the Viliya River from the march and ran up against the proposed German "East Wall" along the west bank of the Oshmyanka River. With few troops to defend it the position was soon overcome by the 3rd Guards Mechanized Corps, in close coordination with 65th Rifle Corps, in the Soly area along the Smorgon - Vilnius railway and overnight the pursuit continued in the direction of the latter place. On July 8 the 65th, 72nd and 3rd Guards Mechanized Corps were all engaged in street fighting for the city. The German garrison was completely isolated on July 10 and broken into two groups by the 65th and 3rd Guards Corps. In a desperate effort to rescue the garrison 600 men of the 2nd Parachute Division were dropped west of Vilnius but most of these were quickly defeated and rounded up. On July 25 the 97th would be awarded the Order of the Red Banner for its part in the liberation of Vilnius.

== Into East Prussia ==
By the end of July 30 the 65th and 72nd Rifle Corps reached the near approaches to Kaunas while facing heavy resistance from Panzergrenadier-Brigade "von Werthern". Overnight on July 30/31 the 65th Corps cleared the line of the old fortress's forts and by 1900 hours had cleared the greater part of the town, with the last pockets of resistance in the northwestern sector eliminated by 0700 on August 1. On August 12 the 136th Rifle Regiment would receive the Order of the Red Banner for its part in forcing a crossing of the Neman River.

Logistical constraints following the lengthy advance of July forced a pause in operations in August and September but the 3rd Belorussian Front commander, Army Gen. I. D. Chernyakhovskii, was determined to press a new offensive into East Prussia, which began in mid-October, led by 5th Army and 11th Guards Army. By now German resistance had gelled and the Gumbinnen operation was a failure which ended on October 30. During its course the 97th was moved to the 45th Rifle Corps but returned to 65th Corps in December.

At the start of the Vistula-Oder Offensive on January 12, 1945, 5th Army was tasked with a vigorous attack in the direction of Mallwischken and Gross Skeisgirren, with the immediate task of breaking through the enemy defense, then encircling and destroying the Tilsit group of forces in conjunction with 39th Army. Progress proved slower than expected, with the German forces putting up fierce resistance. On the morning of January 14, 5th Army broke through the enemy's fourth trench line, and began to speed up the advance until the early afternoon, when heavy German counterattacks began. 65th Corps, with 97th and 144th Rifle Divisions in the first echelon and 371st in the second, faced tank and infantry attacks from the 5th Panzer Division, which slowed, but did not halt, the advance.

The assault began to pick up tempo on the 17th. After consolidating the former German strongpoint at Radschen the 45th and 65th Corps reached a line 3 km east of Brakupenen. By now the German forces that had been thrown out of the Gumbinnen defensive line's main positions were conducting a fighting withdrawal to the west, throwing their last reserves into battle. Heavy fighting continued into January 19, as 65th Corps reached the approaches to the German strongpoint at Rudstannen; during this period operations on the front of 39th Army were developing more successfully and most of the Front's reserves were redirected there. On January 21, 5th Army was directed to encircle and destroy the German grouping defending Insterburg in conjunction with 11th Guards Army on the following day; 65th Corps was to attack towards Karlswalde. By 0600 hours on January 22 the town had been completely cleared. During the following week the Army continued to attack in the direction of Zinten. On January 29, 65th Corps turned its sector north of Friedland over to 28th Army and was moved to the left flank of 45th Corps before beginning an attack to the south. The German forces continued to resist along the Heilsberg fortified line, and it was not until February 7 that 5th Army's forces were able to secure Kreuzburg. On February 19 the 97th would be awarded the Order of Kutuzov, 2nd Degree, for its successes in the opening stage of the East Prussian offensive. On the same date the 136th Rifle Regiment was presented the Order of Suvorov, 3rd Degree, for its part in the fighting for Tilsit and nearby towns.

The offensive was costly to the division and by March 12 it had been reduced to just 2,710 personnel in total. On April 19 Colonel Tsukarev was removed to the position of deputy commander of the 184th Rifle Division and was replaced the next day by Maj. Gen. Aleksandr Konstantinovich Makarev, who would remain in command for the duration. By this time the 5th Army had been removed to the Reserve of the Supreme High Command and was moving by rail to the Far Eastern Front. While en route, on April 26 the 69th Rifle Regiment was presented with the Order of Kutuzov, 3rd Degree, while the 233rd Rifle Regiment received the Order of Aleksandr Nevsky, both for their roles in the battles for the Heiligenbeil Pocket.

== Soviet invasion of Manchuria ==
By the end of June the 97th was in the Maritime Group of the Far Eastern Front, which became the 1st Far Eastern Front at the beginning of August. 5th Army was tasked with making the Front's main attack. It had its three rifle corps deployed abreast, with the 65th Corps on the right flank and the 97th in first echelon. When the attack began on August 9, it struck the Kuanyuehtai (Volynsk) center of resistance, which was held by one battalion of the Japanese 273rd Infantry Regiment of the 124th Infantry Division. The lead divisions enveloped the northern portions of the Japanese strongpoint, leaving isolated units in the rear for the 371st Division in second echelon to deal with. By day's end, 5th Army had torn a gap 35 km wide in the Japanese lines and had advanced anything from 16 – 22 km into the enemy rear. Within three days the second echelon forces, backed by self-propelled artillery, had liquidated all remaining strongholds. By August 13 the lead elements of the Corps were advancing on the road to Mudanjiang. This city was taken after a two-day battle on August 15–16, after which 5th Army advanced southwestward towards Ning'an, Tunghua and Kirin. On August 18 the Japanese capitulation was announced, and 5th Army deployed to accept and process the surrendering units.

== Postwar ==
On September 19 the division and its subunits were awarded their final decorations. The 69th and 233rd Rifle Regiments and the 41st Artillery Regiment each received the Order of the Red Banner while the division as a whole was awarded the Order of Suvorov, 2nd Degree, in general recognition of its successes in the Manchurian campaign. At this point it carried the full title of 97th Rifle, Vitebsk, Order of the Red Banner, Orders of Suvorov and Kutuzov Division (Russian: 97-я стрелковая Витебская Краснознамённая орденов Суворова и Кутузова дивизия). The division was disbanded between June and August 1946, still part of 65th Corps, and its personnel used to reinforce the 144th Rifle Division and other 5th Army units.
