= 212th Rifle Division =

212th Motorized Division (March 1941 - July 29, 1941) 212th Rifle Division (July 29, 1941 - December 8, 1942) 212th Rifle Division (June 8, 1943 - July 1945)
- Active: 1941–1945
- Country: Soviet Union
- Branch: Red Army
- Type: Infantry
- Role: Motorized Infantry
- Size: Division
- Engagements: Operation Barbarossa; Battle of Brody (1941); Battle of Kiev (1941); Case Blue; Battle of Stalingrad; Kotluban Offensives; Operation Kutuzov; Battle of Smolensk (1943); Orsha offensives (1943); Operation Bagration; Lublin–Brest offensive Riga offensive (1944); Vistula–Oder offensive Operation Solstice; Battle of Berlin
- Decorations: Order of the Red Banner (2nd formation); Order of Suvorov (2nd formation); Order of Kutuzov (2nd formation)
- Battle honours: Krichev (2nd formation)

Commanders
- Notable commanders: Maj. Gen. of Technical Troops Sergei Vasilevich Baranov; Col. Vasilii Vladimirovich Bardadin; Col. Ivan Maksimovich Shutov; Col. Georgii Ivanovich Anisimov; Col. Andrei Prokopevich Maltsev; Col. Vladimir Georgievich Kuchinev; Col. Sergei Mikhailovich Maslov

The 212th Rifle Division was formed as an infantry division of the Red Army after a motorized division of that same number was badly damaged and then redesignated about five weeks after the start of the German invasion of the Soviet Union.

After redesignation the division was nearly trapped in the Kiev encirclement but managed to escape. It then moved to Bryansk Front and served under several army commands during the winter and spring of 1942 until it was caught up in the German summer offensive. It was encircled with most of 40th Army and took heavy losses before its remnants managed to cross to the east bank of the Don River. What remained of the division was moved to the Volga Military District for rebuilding, after which it was assigned to 66th Army north of Stalingrad. It was again badly depleted in the October battle south of Kotluban and was soon after disbanded.

A new 212th Rifle Division was formed in June 1943 based on two rifle brigades in 50th Army of Western Front. It was soon involved in a flanking role in the operation to liberate the Oryol salient after which it joined the advance south of Smolensk, winning a battle honor, and later in fighting in support of the efforts of Western Front to seize Orsha as part of 10th Army. After nearly two months in the Reserve of the Supreme High Command it was redeployed to 61st Army, south of the Pripyat Marshes; it remained in this Army for the duration of the war. In the later stages of the destruction of Army Group Center it advanced through the western Pripyat, earning the Order of the Red Banner in the process while all four of its regiments soon won the same decoration for helping to retake the city and fortress of Brest. Along with its Army it was again moved to the Reserve and redeployed, now to the Baltic States, gaining a further decoration in the fighting for Riga. It was in 80th Rifle Corps in 61st Army of 1st Belorussian Front during the advance through Poland and into Germany in early 1945, largely in a secondary role but winning further distinctions on the way. It ended its combat path along the Elbe River. Despite its outstanding record it was disbanded within months of the German surrender.

== 212th Motorized Division ==
The division began forming in March 1941 as part of the prewar buildup of Soviet mechanized forces in the Kiev Special Military District as part of the 15th Mechanized Corps. Once formed its order of battle was as follows:

- 669th Motorized Rifle Regiment
- 692nd Motorized Rifle Regiment
- 131st Tank Regiment
- 655th Artillery Regiment
- 37th Antitank Battalion
- 202nd Antiaircraft Battalion
- 292nd Reconnaissance Battalion
- 380th Light Engineering Battalion
- 593rd Signal Battalion
- 210th Artillery Park Battalion
- 379th Medical/Sanitation Battalion
- 678th Motor Transport Battalion
- 141st Repair and Restoration Battalion
- 41st Regulatory Company
- 470th Chemical Defense (Anti-gas) Company
- 698th Field Postal Station
- 582nd Field Office of the State Bank

Maj. Gen. of Technical Troops Sergei Vasilevich Baranov was appointed to command on March 11. The 131st Regiment was equipped with four battalions totalling 220 light tanks, either T-26 or BT models; the 292nd Reconnaissance Battalion also contained a light tank company of 17 vehicles. The 655th had only one battalion of medium guns, but worse, like most of the "motorized" divisions, the 212th was almost entirely lacking in trucks and tractors, so the guns it had could only be moved by improvised means.

Battle of Brody. Note position of 15th Mechanized Corps.

At the start of the German invasion the Kiev District was redesignated as Southwestern Front and the 15th Mechanized Corps, which also contained the 10th and 37th Tank Divisions plus the 25th Motorcycle Regiment, was under command of 6th Army. It was deployed in the Army's rear generally east and west of Brody.

=== Battle of Brody ===
By the second day of the German invasion the XXXXVIII Motorized Corps' 11th Panzer Division was driving east toward Dubno, northeast of Brody, but was coming under attack from the 37th Tank Division in the area of Kozin. The 212th's mobility issues were preventing it from keeping up with the 37th, while the 10th Tank Division was engaged with rear elements of 11th Panzer near Lopatyn; in fighting at Radekhov it claimed 20 panzers knocked out for the loss of 26 of its own. By the 27th the division had managed to link up with 10th Tanks east of Lopatyn, facing the flanking forces of the XXXXIV Army Corps as 37th Tanks moved northwest from Brody in support. As of July 1 the remnants of 15th Mechanized Corps had left 6th Army and had come under direct command of the Front, and had retreated to positions about 30 km south of Brody.

By July 10 the Corps was back under 6th Army and was falling back toward Berdychiv which marked the limit of 11th Panzer's advance by the end of July 14. During the next week the Corps was forced away from the Army, which was in the process of being encircled in what became the Uman pocket, and the 212th was reassigned to 26th Army, still in Southwestern Front. On July 29 the fiction of it being a motorized division was finally dropped and it was officially redesignated as the 212th Rifle Division. On the same day General Baranov was taken prisoner. He would be executed while in German captivity in February 1942.

== 1st Formation ==
Under the circumstances, in full retreat toward the Dniepr River after taking heavy casualties in the border battles, the division's order of battle was largely theoretical until it had a chance to thoroughly reorganize but eventually was as follows:

- 669th Rifle Regiment
- 692nd Rifle Regiment
- 587th Rifle Regiment (later 131st)
- 354th Artillery Regiment (later 655th)
- 37th Antitank Battalion
- 208th Antiaircraft Battery (later 202nd Antiaircraft Battalion)
- 292nd Reconnaissance Battalion
- 380th Sapper Battalion
- 593rd Signal Battalion
- 379th Medical/Sanitation Battalion
- 84th Chemical Defense (Anti-gas) Company
- 214th Motor Transport Company (later 678th Motor Transport Battalion)
- 470th Field Bakery
- 25th Divisional Veterinary Hospital
- 908th Field Postal Station
- 582nd Field Office of the State Bank

Col. Vasilii Vladimirovich Bardadin was appointed to command on the day the division was redesignated. Two days later it was attempting to hold positions south of Korsun-Shevchenkivskyi against the 60th Motorized Division but by the end of August 11 it had fallen back to southeast Cherkasy along the Tiasmyn River.

=== Battle of Kiev ===
The 38th Army was added to the Front in August and by the start of September the 212th had been moved to that command. At this point, as the largest part of the Front was being threatened with encirclement the main task of 38th Army was to contain the bridgehead over the Dniepr held by 1st Panzer Group at Kremenchuk. The division was on the northwest facing of this position, west of Kozelshchyna. The panzer group attacked northward on September 11 and soon broke through the Soviet lines, driving toward a linkup with 2nd Panzer Group which was pushing south. The 212th was forced off to the northwest across the Sula River near Orzhytsia. This placed the division inside the rapidly forming pocket, but along with the 297th Rifle Division it was moved to the Front reserves and managed to slip out to join what remained of the Front's forces as part of 21st Army in the Kursk area in October.

== Case Blue and Battle of Stalingrad ==
On October 6 Colonel Bardadin left command of the 212th and was replaced by Col. Ivan Maksimovich Shutov. The division was reassigned in November to 3rd Army, still in Southwestern Front. During December this Army was moved to Bryansk Front, and the division remained in this Army as it rebuilt until it was moved to 13th Army in March. The next month it was moved again, now to 40th Army in the same Front. It was still under these commands when the German summer offensive began in late June.

The 212th was positioned south of Tim and when the attack began on June 28. Following a 30-minute artillery preparation and accompanied by strong air support, the XXXXVIII Panzer Corps struck at the boundary between the 160th and the 121st Rifle Division, driving the latter off to the north. XXXXVIII Panzer Corps fielded roughly 325 tanks while 40th Army had only about 250 in its entire sector. The 160th and the 212th to its south faced the 24th Panzer Division with the Großdeutschland Division escheloned to its left which jointly destroyed their defenses before advancing 16 km to the Tim River where the 24th Panzer seized a railroad bridge intact.

40th Army's commander, Maj. Gen. M. A. Parsegov, reported that his divisions had suffered "significant losses" but "had not lost their combat capabilities" while urgently requesting assistance from his Front commander, Lt. Gen. F. I. Golikov. On June 29, despite intermittent heavy rains and thunderstorms the XXIV Panzer Corps struck the 160th and 121st along the Kshen River, leaving the latter in complete disarray. This was already nearly 30 km behind the lines held by the Army when the offensive began. By now the 212th, along with the 160th, 45th and 62nd Rifle Divisions, had been loosely pocketed west of Stary Oskol between the XXXXVIII Panzer and the VIII Army Corps.

By late on July 1 the situation facing 40th Army and its neighbors to the south was producing consternation within the STAVKA. Overnight the Front headquarters belatedly authorized Parsegov to pull his left wing back to the Olym and Oskol Rivers but this had to be carried out "under conditions of the complete absence of control on the part of 40th Army's commander and staff, who by this time were already situated in Voronezh." Early on July 3 Parsegov was replaced by Lt. Gen. M. M. Popov who scrambled to create a defense for the city. During July 4 the 212th made its way to the Don River south of Voronezh, moving perilously between the spearheads of the two panzer corps as further inclement weather hampered German operations. While as many as half of 40th Army's personnel successfully reached and crossed the Don the 212th, 45th and 62nd were among those that no longer existed as organized combat formations. On July 15 Colonel Shutov left command of the division and was replaced by Col. Georgii Ivanovich Anisimov. By the beginning of August the remnants of the three divisions, along with the 141st Rifle Brigade, which had also been caught in the pocket, were moved to the Volga Military District in and around Saratov for rebuilding. As it rebuilt the personnel of the division were noted as being mostly of Kazakh, Uzbek, Tatar and Ukrainian nationalities of the year groups from 1899 to 1923, a highly diverse cadre.

=== Fourth Kotluban Offensive ===
One month later the 212th and 62nd Divisions had been assigned to the 10th Reserve Army in the Reserve of the Supreme High Command, joining the 252nd and 277th Rifle Divisions. The German 6th Army had reached Stalingrad on August 23 by driving a narrow corridor from the Don to the Volga and fighting for the city itself began on September 14. On September 29 Stalin dispatched Army Gen. G. K. Zhukov and Col. Gen. A. M. Vasilevskii to examine the possibilities of a strategic counteroffensive in the area. Zhukov was specifically directed to Don Front, commanded by Lt. Gen. K. K. Rokossovskii, who confirmed that his Front lacked the strength necessary to mount a credible counteroffensive. In response, on October 1 the STAVKA issued orders to reinforce the Front with seven fresh rifle divisions from 10th Reserve Army, including the 212th. They were slated to arrive between October 7–14.

At this time the 62nd Army, isolated within the city, was under extremely heavy pressure from German forces pushing into the factory district. Beginning on September 3 the forces of Stalingrad Front north of the Don-Volga corridor had launched several offensives based on Kotluban in an effort to, ideally, relieve the siege of 62nd Army or, at minimum, divert German forces away from the city. These were directed largely against the XIV Panzer Corps which had originally created the corridor. By October Don Front had taken over this sector and Rokossovskii was preparing for a further effort to break the corridor, what has become known as the Fourth Kotluban Offensive. After leaving the Reserve the 212th was assigned to 66th Army.

The plan for the offensive called for a shock group deployed on the right (west) flank of 66th Army and the left flank of 24th Army to penetrate the German defenses in the 15 km-wide sector north and northeast of Kuzmichi and to advance southeastward toward Orlovka. It was to begin on October 20 and achieve its objective five days later. The 66th Army shock group consisted of the 212th, 62nd, 252nd and 226th Rifle Divisions from the Reserve, supported by the full-strength 91st, 121st and 64th Tank Brigades, each with a complement of roughly 53 tanks. The first three divisions, each with a tank brigade in direct support, formed the first echelon and would attack from the upper reaches of the Sukhaya Mechetka Balka to northeast of Kuzmichi, with the 226th in second echelon. The immediate objectives were Hills 112.7 and 139.7 and, ultimately, Orlovka. Fire support consisted of 664 guns and mortars and Guards-mortars from 12 regiments. The Army's remaining nine rifle divisions were to provide supporting attacks, but were all severely understrength. In light of earlier costly failures Rokossovskii later admitted that he expected the assault to achieve very little:

We were given permission to use seven infantry divisions from the GHQ Reserve for the operation but received no additional supporting means in the shape of artillery, armour, or aircraft. The chances of success were remote, especially as the enemy had well fortified positions. Since the main objective in the operation fell to 66th Army, I had a conversation with Malinovsky, who begged me not to commit the seven new divisions to action. "We'll only waste them," he said... Happily only two [actually four] of the promised seven new divisions arrived by the deadline... As expected, the attack failed. The armies of the Don Front were unable to penetrate the enemy's defenses...

At the end of October 21 the 212th was reported as attacking south of Hill 130.7, having advanced 300m from its jumping-off positions after encountering heavy fire. The next day the 252nd captured the region of the Motor Tractor Station 8 km northeast of Kuzmichi and this success allowed the 212th to advance to Hill 128.9 by 1400 hours. On October 23 the division advanced 1,000m from its jumping-off positions and began fighting for the northwestern slopes of Hill 139.7. On the following day the 226th Division was committed in an increasingly futile effort to maintain the offensive. By October 27 it was clear to both sides that it had run its course and although the STAVKA claimed German casualties of up to 7,000 personnel and 57 tanks the formerly fresh rifle divisions were no longer combat-effective.

In the preparations for Operation Uranus, which would finally encircle the German 6th Army, Rokossovskii ordered seven rifle divisions, including the 212th, to be disbanded by November 2, with their remaining soldiers to be redistributed among the 66th and 24th Armies. The division was officially disbanded on December 8. Colonel Anisimov was moved to command of the 252nd. He would go on to command several rifle corps during the war and gained the rank of lieutenant general in February 1944.

== 2nd Formation ==
A new 212th Rifle Division was formed on June 8, 1943 in 50th Army of Western Front, based on the 125th Rifle Brigade and the 2nd formation of the 4th Rifle Brigade.

=== 4th Rifle Brigade ===
The 1st formation of this brigade was one of a small number of pre-war rifle brigades and was part of the 1st Red Banner Army of Far Eastern Front at the time of the German invasion. It was soon disbanded to help bring the rifle divisions and fortified regions in this front up to full strength.

The 2nd formation began in October and November in the Fergana region of Uzbekistan in the Central Asia Military District as an "Uzbek" national unit. Before it completed forming it was moved by rail to the Moscow Military District where it completed forming for about a month in the Moscow Defence Zone before going to the front in January 1942. In February it was assigned to the 5th Guards Rifle Corps in the reserves of Western Front and on March 17, along with the rest of the Corps it entered the front lines of the 16th Army in that Front. The 4th Brigade remained in this Army for slightly more than a year, from August 11 onward usually as a separate brigade directly under Army command. On April 19, 1943 it was transferred to the 50th Army where it helped form the new 212th Rifle Division.

=== 125th Rifle Brigade ===
This brigade began forming in December 1941 in the Urals Military District but it was not considered complete until May 1942 when it was assigned to Western Front. Upon arrival it joined the 7th Guards Rifle Corps in the Front reserves. After two months in these reserves the brigade went to the 33rd Army and remained under that command either as a separate unit or assigned to 7th Guards Corps until January 1943 when it returned to the Front reserves. In February the 125th joined the 8th Guards Rifle Corps, initially as part of 10th Army, but between February 28 and March 3 it was transferred to 16th Army. This Army had been ordered to carry out an offensive toward Zhizdra and Oryol from the north and the 8th Guards Corps (11th, 31st Guards and 217th Rifle Divisions, 125th and 128th Rifle Brigades, plus three tank brigades) now formed its shock group, attacking southward at dawn on March 4 from a 6 km-wide bridgehead over the Yasenka River, 11 km north of Zhizdra. It faced forces of the 5th Panzer, 208th and 211th Infantry, and a few days later elements of 9th Panzer Division as well. In four days of intense fighting the Corps managed to gain only 3–4 km at a heavy cost in casualties. After a regrouping the offensive was renewed on March 7 with even less success and the entire effort was suspended on March 10. The 125th Brigade began in the Corps' second echelon but also suffered significant losses following the regrouping. On April 19, after leaving 8th Guards Corps, the brigade was reassigned to 50th Army, joining the 4th Brigade.

Once the division completed forming its order of battle, based on the shtat (table of organization and equipment) of December 10, 1942, was as follows:

- 369th Rifle Regiment
- 669th Rifle Regiment
- 692nd Rifle Regiment
- 655th Rifle Regiment
- 37th Antitank Battalion
- 292nd Reconnaissance Company
- 380th Sapper Battalion
- 593rd Signal Battalion (later 395th Signal Company)
- 379th Medical/Sanitation Battalion
- 84th Chemical Defense (Anti-gas) Company
- 73rd Motor Transport Company
- 327th Field Bakery
- 25th Divisional Veterinary Hospital
- 18058th Field Postal Station
- 1613th Field Office of the State Bank

Col. Andrei Prokopevich Maltsev, who had been in command of 4th Brigade, took command of the division on the day it officially formed. Between the two brigades there were eight rifle battalions, two mortar battalions and two artillery battalions to provide personnel and equipment so the formation proceeded quickly.

=== Operation Kutuzov ===
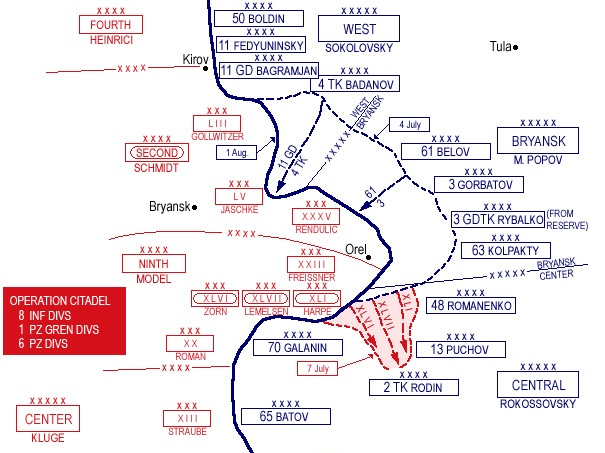
Map of Operation Kutuzov. Note position of 50th Army.

50th Army was located well to the north of the German summer offensive and played no direct role in it, but once the forces of German 9th Army had been stymied on the north face of the salient the STAVKA ordered the Bryansk Front and the southern armies of Western Front to attack the north face of the German salient around Oryol. 50th Army's main mission was to secure the right (north) flank of 11th Guards Army, but also to launch an attack of its own on its left flank on a 6 km-wide front with the 212th and 324th Rifle Divisions toward the Kolpino–marker 199.9 sector. This effort would be supported by the fire of three artillery regiments, an artillery battalion, a mortar battalion and two Guards-mortar regiments. The attack would be supported by the 64th Rifle Division and the objective was to encircle and destroy units of the 134th Infantry Division and subsequently to advance toward Zikeevo and capture it.

The assault began on the morning of July 13 following a short artillery preparation. By 0700 hours both the 212th and 324th had forced the Zhizdra River and broken into the German trenches north of Rechitsa but due to an insufficient density of artillery (21 tubes per kilometre of front) they did not manage to break through the German defense. This was based on an organized fire plan and a well-developed system of wire obstacles and minefields. The commander of 50th Army, Lt. Gen. I. V. Boldin, called off further attacks in favor of a regrouping along a narrower sector. The following day the main forces of the two divisions concentrated on a 2.5 km-wide front, now backed by the main mass of the Army's artillery and, following a 30-minute preparation, broke through east of Rechitsa. The 64th Rifle Division made a supporting attack and on July 15 the 49th Rifle Division was committed into the breach. Two days later these were joined by the 413th Rifle Division in a general offensive. This continued despite German resistance and difficult conditions of near-roadless wooded and swampy terrain until July 20 when the Army began to consolidate along the line Paliki–Nemetskii–Alekseevskii.

Early in August 50th Army was transferred to Bryansk Front. As Operation Kutuzov continued the important center of Karachev was liberated on August 15. The 50th and 11th Armies attacking the morning of August 14 as it became apparent that the German Zhizdra grouping was finally pulling back. By August 18 the 50th had reached a line from Yasenok to Inochka to Orlya. Later in the month the 212th returned to Western Front, now as part of 10th Army.

== Into Western Russia and Belarus ==
This Army had already begun probing attacks on August 6 in preparation for the Front's offensive toward Smolensk. 10th Army was under-resourced with limited artillery and armor support but had achieved a surprise advance of 5 km on August 10 near Kirov. The Front commander, Col. Gen. V. D. Sokolovskii, decided to reinforce this success although it would take several days to do so. By the time the 212th arrived this brief opportunity had disappeared and 10th Army was ordered to conduct intensive maskirovka operations between August 23 and 27 in preparation for the next stage of the offensive. This began the following day and the Army was limited to holding attacks in support.

By mid-September, as Western Front was closing in on Smolensk, 10th Army, on its left (south) flank, was advancing toward the Desna River, still mounting supporting attacks to assist the main effort and Bryansk Front's advance on Roslavl. Smolensk was liberated on September 25 and on the same day Roslavl was abandoned to 10th Army. As the summer offensive rolled into the autumn, on September 29 the division forced a crossing of the Sozh River with the 385th Rifle Division and liberated the town of Krichev, for which it was awarded a battle honor:

"By the order of the Supreme High Command, the name of Krichev is awarded to... 212th Rifle Division (Colonel Maltsev, Andrei Prokopevich)..."

As of October 1 the 212th was still a separate rifle division in 10th Army, facing the German XII Army Corps. In early part of the month, as Western Front made its first attempt to liberate Orsha, 10th Army was on the Front's left flank, and the 212th deployed to protect the Army's left flank near the village of Petukhovka while its 38th Rifle Corps took up positions in the bend of the Pronya River southeast of Chausy. Given the relatively small size of the Army it was limited to a passive, secondary role for the time being.

=== Orsha Offensives ===
Later in the month the division joined the 64th and 385th Divisions in 38th Corps. The Novyi Bykhov - Propoisk Offensive began on November 22, but 10th Army did not join in until the 28th, attacking across the Pronya River just north of Petukhovka on its boundary with 50th Army. 38th Corps struck at the boundary between the German 131st and 260th Infantry Divisions' defenses south of Chausy, in cooperation with attacks by 50th Army's 369th Rifle Division. The 385th was in first echelon with the 64th, and the 212th in second. Within two days the two lead divisions had penetrated German defenses at Vysokoe, wheeled northward, and attacked their positions at Chausy, a city that anchored the right flank of German 9th Army. The 212th advanced as far as Shaparovo, 5 km south of Chausy; meanwhile the 64th and 385th seized Lepeny and other villages southwest of the city.

Chausy remained the objective of 10th Army during the following months. On December 14 Colonel Maltsev left command of the division; he went on to study at the K. E. Voroshilov Military Academy before returning to the front as deputy commander of the 71st Rifle Corps and later as commander of the 88th Rifle Division. He was replaced by Col. Vladimir Georgievich Kuchinev, who had previously commanded the 338th Rifle Division. On January 4, 1944 the 3rd and 50th Armies launched a new attack in the direction of Bykhov. In support of this, 10th Army was ordered to attack German defenses north and south of Chausy at the junction of the Sozh and Pronya. 38th Corps, now consisting of just the 64th and 212th, was to attack the defenses of Corps Detachment D in the 12 km-wide sector from just south of Chausy to Golovenchitsy, penetrate the Detachment's defenses, and advance to link up with other 10th Army forces advancing westward north of the city. By this stage the divisions of the three Soviet armies were averaging about 3,500 personnel each. In the event the Corps made only minor gains and late on January 8 the offensive was shut down.

== Operation Bagration ==
Later in the month the 212th was withdrawn to the Reserve of the Supreme High Command for much-needed rebuilding. It was assigned to the 114th Rifle Corps of 21st Army while in the Reserve. In March it was reassigned to the 9th Guards Rifle Corps of 61st Army in the first formation of 2nd Belorussian Front, south of the Pripyat Marshes. The Corps also contained the 12th Guards and 415th Rifle Divisions. The division would remain in this Army for the duration of the war.

The main part of offensive against Army Group Center began on June 23, but the left flank forces of 1st Belorussian Front (previously first formation of 2nd Belorussian Front) did not enter the fighting until early July. As of the first of that month 61st Army consisted of just six rifle divisions and 9th Guards Corps had just the 12th Guards and 212th Divisions under command. Furthermore the Army was badly stretched out along the Pripyat and was facing a German grouping in and around Polesye. Its first efforts to begin active operations during July 3–5 were not successful; an attack by the division, in conjunction with the 415th and 397th Rifle Divisions along the Army's left flank was met by powerful German artillery and mortar fire (26 batteries) and was forced to a halt. On the 7th the 9th Guards Corps began an attack towards Pinsk while the 89th Rifle Corps, along with the Dniepr Flotilla, began to press along the Pripyat from the east to the west. The adjacent 28th Army launched an attack with one division on Luninets and the German forces began to hurriedly retreat to the west.

=== Brest-Siedlce Offensive ===
On July 17 the Front began a drive towards Brest and Siedlce as the offensive began to slow due to logistics and German reinforcements. 61st Army launched its main attack with its right flank in the direction of Strigovo and Chernavchitsi and aided by the success of the left flank of 28th Army broke through the German defense along the Mukhavets River and on July 20 captured the major rail and road junction of Kobryn. In recognition on July 25 the 212th was decorated with the Order of the Red Banner, while the 369th (Lt. Colonel Voloshchenko, Vladimir Grigorevich), 669th (Major Derevyanko, Andrei Ivanovich) and 692nd Rifle Regiments (Colonel Podberezin, Ilya Mikhailovich) plus the 655th Artillery Regiment (Major Larichev, Nikifor Timofeevich) all received the town's name as a battle honor.

Later on July 20 the bulk of 61st Army was removed to the Reserve of the Supreme High Command but due to still-stubborn German resistance the Front commander, Marshal Rokossovskii, was authorized to retain 9th Guards Corps to assist the 28th and 70th Armies in the ongoing offensive towards Brest. Over the next four days of heavy fighting the Corps managed to advance from 16–20 km due west and there appeared to be a developing opportunity to encircle the German Brest grouping. On July 25 and 26 the Corps continued advancing slowly while repelling counterattacks while 70th Army's right flank broke through the first positions of the Brest fortified area. By the end of July 27 the Corps was on a line from Zadworce to Wulka-Zastavska and Brest was encircled while the German force was seeking at any price to break out. The town and fortress were both liberated the next day and only small groups of defenders managed to break out to the west while most were captured or destroyed in the woods west of the town. The 212th received considerable recognition for its part in the victory; on August 10 it was presented with the Order of Suvorov, 2nd Degree, while all four regiments were awarded the Order of the Red Banner. Soon afterwards the 9th Guards Corps rejoined 61st Army in the Reserve of the Supreme High Command.

=== Riga Offensive ===
While in the Reserve the division was moved to the 80th Rifle Corps, joining the 82nd and 356th Rifle Divisions. It would remain in this Corps for the duration of the war. 61st Army rejoined the active fighting on September 13 as part of 3rd Baltic Front, and was soon advancing into southeastern Estonia. In early October the division advanced west past Valmiera, Latvia as its Army pushed on towards Riga, helping to seal off the Courland pocket following the liberation of that city. On October 31 the 212th was further honored for its role in the battle for Riga with the award to the Order of Kutuzov, 2nd Degree. When 3rd Baltic was disbanded shortly after Riga was taken the Army was reassigned to 1st Baltic Front until nearly the end of November. On November 29 the commander of the 1st Belorussian Front received the following:

"By order of the Supreme Commander-in-Chief, the following are being transferred to you by railroad:... b) 61st Army, consisting of:... 80th Rifle Corps (82nd, 212th and 356th Rifle Divisions)... along with reinforcements, service establishments and rear organs. The army will arrive approximately between 9 December and 1 January at the Lukow station."

A further directive on December 7 ordered that the personnel strength of the Army's nine rifle divisions be reinforced to 6,500 men each, as well as 900 horses. On November 17 Colonel Kuchinev had left his command due to illness; he was moved to the reserve and then later to the training establishment before his retirement in 1947. He was replaced by Col. Sergei Mikhailovich Maslov who had previously served as chief of staff of the 397th Rifle Division before being wounded in August. He would lead the 212th until it was disbanded.

== Into Poland and Germany ==
In the plan for the Vistula-Oder offensive the task of finally liberating Warsaw fell to the 47th Army (attacking from the north), 1st Polish Army, and two corps of 61st Army (from the south). After reaching and clearing the northern bank of the Pilica River that force was to move in the direction of Błonie), while the 9th Guards Corps was to help clear a path for the commitment of 2nd Guards Tank Army on the third day and then advance towards Sochaczew. When the offensive began at 0855 hours on January 14, 1945 after a 25-minute artillery preparation the Army's forward battalions were halted by German fire in front of the switch position along the line of the Pilica and could not force a crossing. An additional two-hour preparation (which was supplemented by all the artillery on the 3rd Shock Army), and the commitment of the Army's main forces at 1100 hours was required to overcome resistance. As a result the 61st advanced only 2–4 km during the day.

More successful advances on the Army's flanks soon caused these German forces to fall back, and through the rest of January the 212th, along with its 80th Corps, joined in the massive advance across western Poland and into Germany; by January 26, 61st Army was receiving orders to reach the Oder River six days later and force a crossing. In mid-February 61st Army was redirected northwards in the direction of Stettin in response to a German armored counter-offensive, Operation Solstice. In recognition of the division's success in breaking the German defense south of Warsaw, on February 19 its four regiments would each be awarded the Order of Suvorov, 3rd Degree, while the 380th Sapper Battalion and 593rd Signal Battalion were both given the Order of the Red Star. Later, on April 26 the 655th Artillery Regiment would be presented with the Order of Kutuzov, 3rd Degree, for its part in the fighting around Stargard.

=== Berlin Operation ===
At the start of the Berlin operation, 61st Army was deployed along the east bank of the Oder on a sector from Nipperwiese to Alt Rudnitz. The 80th Corps was on the Army's right flank with just two divisions; the 234th was in first echelon and the 212th in second. Although the main offensive began on April 16, 61st Army did not attack until the next day, when it won a bridgehead 3 km wide and up to 1,000m deep. By the 22nd the 61st had cleared the Oder and Alte Oder and had turned its front completely to the north and three days later had reached points 55 km west of the Oder. On April 29 it forced the Havel River in the area of Zehdenick against minimal resistance. Finally, on May 2, having advanced 60 km during the day against no resistance, reached the Elbe River in the area of Havelberg, and the next day met up with elements of the U.S. 84th Infantry Division near Gnefsdorf. It was here that the 212th and its Army ended its combat path.

== Postwar ==
At this point the men and women of the division shared the collective title 212th Rifle, Krichev, Order of the Red Banner, Orders of Suvorov and Kutuzov Division. (Russian: 212-я стрелковая Кричевская Краснознамённая орденов Суворова и Кутузова дивизия.) In final awards on May 28 the 692nd Rifle Regiment was awarded the Order of Kutuzov, 3rd Degree, while the 593rd Signal Battalion won the Order of Alexander Nevsky, both for their roles in the Berlin offensive. Despite a highly distinguished record, under the terms of STAVKA Order No. 11095 of May 29, 1945, part 6, the 212th was listed as one of the rifle divisions to be "disbanded in place". It was disbanded in Germany in accordance with the directive during the summer of 1945.
