= 336th Division =

336th Division may refer to:

- 336th Infantry Division, Wehrmacht, Germany
- 336th Rifle Division, Soviet Union

== See also ==
- List of military divisions by number
