= 356th Rifle Division =

356th Rifle Division (August, 1941 – 1945)
- Active: 1941–1945
- Country: Soviet Union
- Branch: Red Army
- Type: Division
- Role: Infantry
- Engagements: Battle of Moscow; Operation Kutuzov; Battle of the Dniepr; Gomel–Rechitsa Offensive; Kalinkovichi-Mozyr Offensive; Ozarichi-Ptich Offensive; Operation Bagration; Bobruisk Offensive; Lublin-Brest Offensive; Riga Offensive (1944); Vistula-Oder Offensive; Operation Solstice; Battle of Berlin
- Decorations: Order of the Red Banner; Order of Suvorov
- Battle honours: Kalinkovichi; Riga

Commanders
- Notable commanders: Maj. Gen. Pyotr Vasilevich Pererva; Maj. Gen. Mikhail Grigorevich Makarov

The 356th Rifle Division formed in August, 1941, as a standard Red Army rifle division, in the Kuibyshev Oblast. After reaching the front it played a minor role in the defense of Moscow and the winter counteroffensive and remained in the line north and east of the Oryol salient through 1942 and into 1943. It then took part in the offensive to reduce this salient, Operation Kutuzov, after which it advanced towards the Dniepr River through the summer and autumn before becoming involved in the complex fighting in eastern Belarus in the winter of 1943/44, during which it won a battle honor. In the early stages of Operation Bagration the 356th was instrumental in the liberation of Bobruisk, for which it received the Order of the Red Banner. Later during this offensive the division advanced into the Baltic states before being reassigned to 1st Belorussian Front for the final offensive on Germany. Remarkably, the division was assigned to the 61st Army for nearly its entire wartime path. It ended the war north of Berlin, along the Elbe River, but in spite of a fine record of service it was disbanded shortly thereafter.

== Formation ==
The division began forming in August, 1941, near Kuibyshev in the Volga Military District. Its partial order of battle was as follows:

- 1181st Rifle Regiment
- 1183rd Rifle Regiment
- 1185th Rifle Regiment
- 918th Artillery Regiment
- 417th Reconnaissance Company

The division went through the war with only two commanding officers, the first of which, Col. Pyotr Vasilevich Pererva, was assigned on September 17. While completing its formation the division was assigned to the newly-forming 61st Army in the same District, in the Reserve of the Supreme High Command. In December it was assigned, with its Army, to the Bryansk Front, where it first saw combat.

=== Battle of Moscow ===
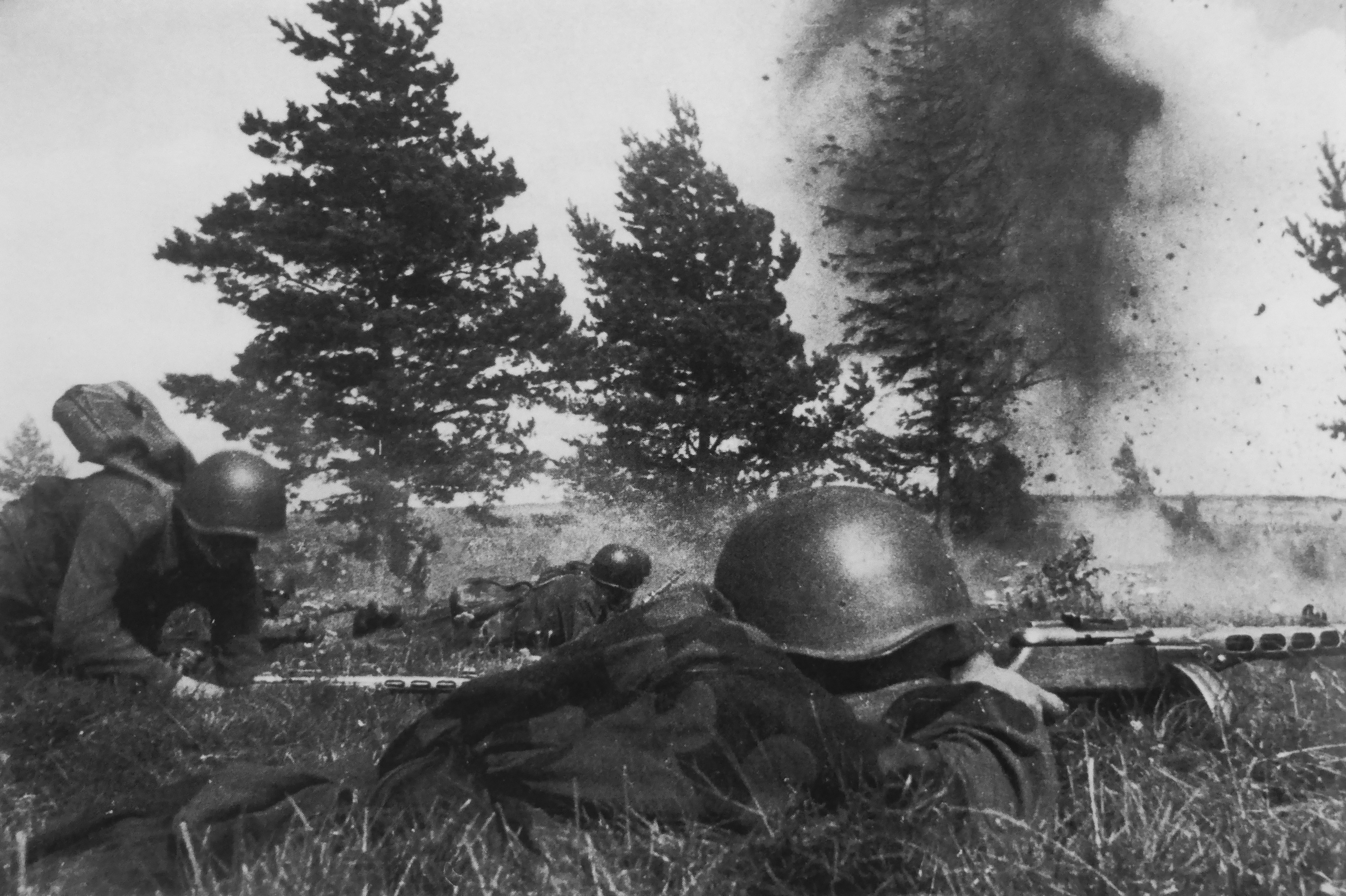
Soviet submachine gunners Starshina Maksim Antonovich Shiov, Sergeant P.E. Yegorov, and rifleman Red Army man Ivan Ilyich Kishenev of the 2nd Rifle Company, 1181st Rifle Regiment hug the ground during German shelling, Western Front, 1942

In mid-January, 1942, 61st Army was reassigned to Western Front, which was encountering resistance from the German 112th and 167th Infantry Divisions, plus elements of other units, grouped around the town of Bolkhov. By January 20 the 356th, on the left flank of its Army, was fighting defensively along the line of the Oka River from Budgovishche to Chergodaevo. The fighting against the Bolkhov Group went on for the next ten days; during this time the division made an unsuccessful attack on the village of Khmelevaya before returning to the defense along its previous line.

== Into Western Russia and Belarus ==
In April, 61st Army returned to Bryansk Front. Through the rest of the year and the first half of 1943 it remained along much the same lines it had reached during the winter counteroffensive. On November 17, Colonel Pererva was promoted to the rank of Major General, but was replaced ten days later by Col. Mikhail Grigorevich Makarov. Makarov would remain in command for the duration of the war, being promoted to Major General on September 15, 1943, while Pererva would go on to serve as deputy commander of 61st Army through much of the late-war period.

Following the Soviet victory at Stalingrad, Bryansk Front joined in the general winter offensive along the southern half of the front, in its case against positions held by elements of German Second Panzer Army. On February 12, 61st Army launched a dawn attack with 12th Guards, 342nd Rifle Division and the 356th, backed by the 68th Tank Brigade, against the defenses of the 112th Infantry Division north of Bolkhov, but within hours the assault faltered in the face of withering German fire. The Army's commander, Lt. Gen. P.A. Belov, ascribed the setback to insufficient ammunition and blowing snow which hindered the fire of the tanks. A further effort was made on this sector beginning on February 22, with the main attack being made by Western Front's 16th Army, supported by 61st and 3rd Armies. The intention was to collapse the German-held salient around Oryol in concert with attacks from the south by 13th and 48th Armies. Once again, the 12th Guards and 68th Tanks were sent in against 112th Infantry, and were repelled with serious losses for the guardsmen. Acknowledging defeat on this sector, Bryansk Front commander Col. Gen. M.A. Reiter ordered the 356th, plus the 342nd and 12th Guards, to be transferred to 3rd Army, where they were to reinforce that Army's bridgehead on the west bank of the Oka. This reinforcement helped to contain the numerous German counterattacks against this bridgehead between February 27 and March 1, but continued pressure finally forced 3rd Army to abandon the bridgehead by March 12, and the division reverted to 61st Army.

In July the division took part in Operation Kutuzov in Bryansk Front before being transferred to Central Front on September 23. On October 20 this Front was renamed Belorussian Front.

As of September 30, the 356th was in the 89th Rifle Corps, which reached the Dniepr on this date on a wide front south of Radul but was unable to gain any footholds on the west bank due to strong German resistance and well-organized artillery and mortar fire. In preparation for the Gomel - Rechitsa Offensive Central Front underwent a major regrouping from October 8–14, during which 89 Corps was redeployed into new positions south of Liubech. However, it was the other two corps of 61st Army, (29th Rifle Corps and 9th Guards Rifle Corps) which were to form the shock group when the offensive began on October 22. In heavy fighting over the next week the Soviet attackers forced elements of German 2nd Army to make a phased withdrawal to new positions in the rear and advanced as much as 20 km, but neither of the primary objectives were taken.

The renamed Belorussian Front launched a new effort to take Gomel and Rechitsa on November 10. By this time the 356th's former corps-mates, 336th and 415th Rifle Divisions, had been transferred to the 13th Army, so it was acting as a separate division in 61st Army. It was assigned to defend its Army's extended left flank from Domamerki to Liubech, facing the 251st Division Group of XXXXVI Panzer Corps' composite Corps Detachment E. On the first day the Front's forces broke out of their bridgehead at Loev and within three days had torn a gap 15 km wide and 8–12 km deep in the German defenses. By the end of the month 61st Army had advanced to within 15 km of Kalinkovichi.

On January 8, 1944, Belorussian Front launched the Kalinkovichi - Mozyr Offensive. For its role in the liberation of the former town the 356th was awarded a divisional honorific:

"KALINKOVICHI"... 356th Rifle Division (Major General Makarov, Mikhail Grigorevich)... The troops who participated in the liberation of Mozyr and Kalinkovichi, by the order of the Supreme High Command of January 14, 1944, and a commendation in Moscow, are given a salute of 20 artillery salvoes from 224 guns.

The Ozarichi - Ptich Offensive immediately followed. This began on 61st Army's sector on January 15 when 9th Guards Rifle Corps was tasked with eliminating Corps Detachment E's bridgehead east of the Ipa River at Klinsk. This effort was unsuccessful, and on the next day the Guards were replaced by the 356th and 55th Rifle Divisions to contain the bridgehead. On the 18th, as the offensive developed, the German forces withdrew from the bridgehead which was no longer tenable due to Soviet advances elsewhere.

== Operation Bagration ==
In April the division was withdrawn into the reserves of 1st Belorussian Front for rebuilding. When it returned to the line in June it was assigned to the 105th Rifle Corps of 65th Army; the next two months would be its only service outside 61st Army. At the start of the summer offensive the 105th Corps was in the first echelon of its Army along with 18th Rifle Corps and with 1st Guards Tank Corps and massive quantities of artillery in support, facing the German 35th and 36th Infantry Divisions of 9th Army. The immediate objective of 105th Corps was to defeat the enemy in the area of Parichi by the end of the third day, and then to advance to the northwest towards Bobruisk, cutting the enemy's communications from there to the southwest and west. At the outset the 356th and the 115th Rifle Brigade formed the 65th Army's reserve. The 15th Guards Tank Brigade of 1st Guards Tank Corps was attached to the division, with 65 T-34/85 tanks and a motorized rifle battalion.

On June 28 the division was again assigned to 105th Rifle Corps from the Army reserve, and moved up to a line from south of Yeloviki to the south bank of the Berezina; it was assigned, with its attached armor, to break into Bobruisk from the north. Shortly past noon that day Hitler finally gave permission for all German units to abandon Bobriusk. The breakout, led by 20th Panzer Division with 383rd Infantry Division serving as rearguard, began at 2300 hrs. that night. The German force had from 10,000 to 15,000 formed troops plus about 12 assault guns and tanks in the first echelon, followed by numerous stragglers. This advance struck the 356th and the 1st Guards Motorized Brigade at 2330 hrs. and, despite the arrival of Soviet reinforcements, achieved a breakthrough on the division's sector. While suffering severe casualties, the German force won a mostly temporary reprieve. At 1000 hrs. on June 29 the final attack on the city was launched, with the 356th and 354th Divisions leading the way in crossing the Berezina from the east. In the fighting for the city itself the German forces lost more than 7,000 officers and men killed and 2,000 taken prisoner, while their other losses amounted to 12 trainloads of food, forage and equipment; 400 artillery pieces of which 100 were in working order; 60 knocked-out tanks and self-propelled guns; more than 500 motor vehicles; and six depots of military stores. The division was recognized for its role in the liberation of Bobruisk on July 5 with the award of the Order of the Red Banner.

In July the division was transferred to 80th Rifle Corps, still in 65th Army. On July 20 the division assembled in a forest 3 km southeast of Bitovo on the approaches to the Bug River north of Brest, where the German forces were desperately trying to restore a defensive front. During the morning 75th Guards Rifle Division led the advance, with 115th Rifle Brigade in second echelon while the 356th took up the rear. At noon the 115th came under air attack from up to 20 enemy bombers; three vehicles were destroyed and Corps commander Maj. Gen. Ivan Leotevich Ragulia was severely wounded. He was evacuated to the medical base of the 356th and operated on, but died of his wounds two days later.

During August, 80th Corps was moved to 61st Army which was back in the Reserve of the Supreme High Command. By mid-September 61st Army was part of 3rd Baltic Front, and was advancing into southeastern Estonia. In early October the division fought west past Valmiera, Latvia as its Army pushed on towards Riga, helping to seal off the Courland pocket following the liberation of that city. On October 13 the division received its second battle honor:

"RIGA"... 356th Rifle Division (Major General Makarov, Mikhail Grigorevich)... The troops who participated in the liberation of Riga, by the order of the Supreme High Command of October 13, 1944, and a commendation in Moscow, are given a salute of 24 artillery salvoes from 324 guns.

On October 31 it was further honored for its role in the battle for Riga with the award to the Order of Suvorov, 2nd degree.

== Into Germany ==
Following the Riga campaign, 3rd Baltic Front was dissolved, and on November 29, 61st Army was reassigned to 1st Belorussian Front. In orders to the commander of that Front, the Army was expected to arrive by rail at Łuków between December 9 and January 1, 1945. When the Vistula-Oder Offensive began on January 12, 61st Army attacked out of the bridgehead over the Vistula at Magnuszew, but faced slow going on the first day despite massive artillery support due to effective enemy resistance along the Pilica River line. More successful advances on the Army's flanks soon forced these German forces to fall back, and through the rest of January the 356th, along with its 80th Corps, joined in the massive advance across western Poland and into Germany; by January 26, 61st Army was receiving orders to reach the Oder River six days later and force a crossing. In mid-February 61st Army was redirected northwards in the direction of Stettin in response to a German armored counter-offensive, Operation Solstice.

At the start of the Berlin operation, 61st Army was deployed along the east bank of the Oder on a sector from Nipperwiese to Alt Rudnitz; the 356th was in Army reserve. Although the main offensive began on April 16, 61st Army did not attack until the next day, when it won a bridgehead 3 km wide and up to 1,000m deep. By the 22nd the 61st had cleared the Oder and Alte Oder and had turned its front completely to the north and three days later had reached points 55 km west of the Oder. On April 29 it forced the Havel River in the area of Zehdenick against minimal resistance. Finally, on May 2, having advanced 60 km during the day against no resistance, reached the Elbe River in the area of Havelberg, and the next day met up with elements of the U.S. 84th Infantry Division near Gnefsdorf. It was here that the 356th and its Army ended its combat path.

== Postwar ==
According to STAVKA Order No. 11095 of May 29, 1945, part 6, the 356th is listed as one of the rifle divisions to be "disbanded in place". It was disbanded in Germany in accordance with the directive during the summer of 1945.
