= 12th Guards Rifle Division =

- Active: 1942–1946
- Country: Soviet Union
- Branch: Red Army
- Type: Division
- Role: Infantry
- Engagements: World War II; Battle of Moscow; Operation Kutuzov; Battle of Smolensk; Gomel-Rechitsa Offensive; Kalinkovichi-Mozyr Offensive; Operation Bagration; Lublin–Brest Offensive; Baltic Offensive; Riga Offensive; Vistula-Oder Offensive; East Pomeranian Offensive; Battle of Berlin
- Decorations: Order of the Red Banner; Order of Suvorov
- Battle honours: Pinsk

Commanders
- Notable commanders: Maj. Gen. Mikhail Aleksandrovich Siyazov; Maj. Gen. Konstantin Maksimovich Erastov; Col. Porfiry Martinovich Gudz; Col. Dmitry Kuzmich Malkov

The 12th Guards Rifle Division was reformed as an elite infantry division of the Red Army in January, 1942, based on the 1st formation of the 258th Rifle Division and served in that role until after the end of the Great Patriotic War. It was in 50th Army when it was redesignated but was soon assigned to the 49th Army, then to the 10th Army and finally to the 16th Army near the end of that month. In June it was assigned to the 9th Guards Rifle Corps of 61st Army where it remained almost continually for the duration of the war, serving under several Front commands but always on the central sector of the front. During the summer offensive in 1943 it fought through western Russia and into Belarus during the winter campaigns there. Along with the rest of 61st Army it took part in the second stage of Operation Bagration in the summer of 1944, advancing into the Pripyat marshes region, winning a battle honor and shortly thereafter the Order of the Red Banner. After a short time in the Reserve of the Supreme High Command it was moved to the 3rd Baltic and later the 1st Baltic Front driving into Latvia and Lithuania, being decorated with the Order of Suvorov for its part in the occupation of Riga. In December it was returned to the 1st Belorussian Front and took part in the offensives that propelled the Red Army into Poland and eastern Germany. After the fall of Berlin the division advanced to the Elbe River where it linked up with the US 84th Infantry Division. Following the German surrender it was disbanded in July, 1946.

== Formation ==
The division was officially raised to Guards status on January 5, 1942 in recognition of its role in the liberation of Kaluga on December 30. Its sub-units would not receive their Guards redesignations until February. The 258th had been one of the first divisions formed after the German invasion with a distinct "national" or ethnic identity; it was known as the Uzbek division. Its order of battle, based on the first wartime shtat (table of organization and equipment) for rifle divisions, was eventually as follows:

- 29th Guards Rifle Regiment (from 954th Rifle Regiment)
- 32nd Guards Rifle Regiment (from 991st Rifle Regiment)
- 37th Guards Rifle Regiment (from 999th Rifle Regiment)
- 31st Guards Artillery Regiment (from 841st Artillery Regiment)
- 124th Ski Battalion (until February 16)
- 8th Guards Antitank Battalion
- 3rd Guards Antiaircraft Battery (until April 10, 1943)
- 23rd Guards Mortar Battalion (until October 30, 1942)
- 10th Guards Reconnaissance Company
- 9th Guards Sapper Battalion
- 49th Guards Signal Battalion (later 11th Guards)
- 5th Guards Medical/Sanitation Battalion
- 13th Guards Chemical Defense (Anti-gas) Company
- 15th Guards Motor Transport Company
- 7th Guards Field Bakery
- 6th Guards Divisional Veterinary Hospital
- 957th Field Postal Station
- 809th Field Office of the State Bank

Maj. Gen. Mikhail Aleksandrovich Siyazov, who had led the 258th Rifle Division since November 17, 1941 and had been promoted to that rank three days earlier, remained in command.

=== Battle of Moscow ===
The division was in 50th Army of Western Front when it was redesignated. During January 7–8 the Army attacked along its entire front against German forces that were organized for all-round defense. The division was on its right flank and, in cooperation with the 290th Rifle Division, advanced successfully and reached a line from Verteby to Karavai to Dvortsy by January 12 before running into stiffer opposition. On January 14 the adjacent 49th Army began an attack along its entire front against stubborn resistance in an effort to reach, among other objectives, a fortified line from Kondrovo to Polotnyany Zavod. On the same date Front directive No. 412 assigned the 12th Guards to the 49th with the tasks of accelerating to offensive and simultaneously put pressure on the rear of German units operating against its former Army along the Yukhnov axis.

The division moved to concentrate in the area of Ozerna and Subbotino, 1 km north of Davydovo and joined the resumed offensive on January 16. During the next day it was fighting along the western bank of the Ugra River, attacking in the direction of Malaya Rudnya with its main forces, while a detachment was simultaneously blocking Sabelnikovo from the north and east. Meanwhile, the 133rd and 173rd Rifle Divisions were taking heavy casualties in frontal attacks against the fortified line. By January 18 the 173rd and 238th Rifle Divisions were attacking to outflank the line and cut off the defenders' retreat to the west and the 12th Guards completed its concentration before advancing in the direction of Pogorelovo. During the next day it was involved in heavy fighting for the villages of Matovo and Rudnya (3km west of Sabelnikovo) and captured them. Under intense pressure and in danger of encirclement the German forces began to withdraw from the Kondrovo area. On January 20 the division was transferred to the 10th Army and moved to the Sukhinichi region for operations against German forces attacking from the Zhizdra-Zikeevo area.

By the beginning of February the 12th Guards had been transferred yet again, now to the 16th Army, still in Western Front. The counteroffensive in front of Moscow had mostly run out of steam by this point. On March 26 General Siyazov was appointed as deputy commander of 5th Army and handed the division to Maj. Gen. Konstantin Maksimovich Erastov. In April it was moved to the 58th Army in the Reserve of the Supreme High Command for much-needed rebuilding before returning to 16th Army in May. In June it was finally assigned to 61st Army, still in Western Front, where it became the main formation of the new 9th Guards Rifle Corps, along with four rifle brigades: the 104th, 108th, 110th and 257th; the division also provided the supporting cadre to form the Corps' headquarters. Remarkably, the division would remain in this Army for the duration of the war, mostly in 9th Guards Corps but occasionally under direct Army command.

== Second Winter Offensive and Operation Kutuzov ==
During the latter half of 1942 the 61st Army was involved in battles of local significance while the main fighting went on around Stalingrad and Rzhev. In November Col. Porfirii Martinovich Gudz, who had previously commanded the 31st Guards Rifle Division before being wounded, became deputy commander of 12th Guards and from January to March, 1943 served as acting commander until General Erastov returned. Following the German defeat at Stalingrad, in February 1943 the Army was transferred to Bryansk Front and on February 12 assaulted the defenses of the German 2nd Panzer Army's 112th Infantry Division in the Ulanova and Merkulavsky sector along with the 342nd and 356th Rifle Divisions, supported by the 68th Tank Brigade. Within hours the assault faltered in the face of heavy German fire.

The 16th Army launched a new attack against 2nd Panzer Army on February 22, supported by 61st and 3rd Armies north and east of Bolkhov. The main attack was mounted by six rifle divisions backed by three tank brigades attacking along the Zhizdra axis but only managed to gain 7km by February 25 due to rain and muddy roads and a skilful defense. Meanwhile the commander of 61st Army, Lt. Gen. P. A. Belov, planned to lead his attack with the 12th Guards supported by the 68th Tank Brigade once again against the defenses of 112th Infantry about 18km north of Bolkhov. If the attack succeeded it would be reinforced by the 342nd and 356th Divisions but in the event one regiment of the 112th repulsed the division with relative ease and at considerable cost in casualties. Bryansk Front acknowledged the failure on this sector and ordered Belov to transfer the three divisions to the 3rd Army to reinforce its bridgehead on the west bank of the Oka River. In the event the 12th Guards was the last of the three to arrive, one of its rifle regiments never actually left the 61st Army sector, and by March 1 German counterattacks had eliminated the bridgehead, so it is possible the division never actually left the Army's command.

During the following five days Bryansk Front attempted to renew its offensive, but with little success. The Front command reported to the STAVKA on March 6, among other items, that "The 61st Army fought stubborn battles during the day with units of the 12th Guards Rifle Division against enemy forces attacking in the Sivkovo and Gorodishche sector." The division, with its Army, remained in much the same positions until Operation Kutuzov began. In April the division was under direct command of the Army headquarters; as of May 1 it was back in 9th Guards Corps with the 76th Guards Rifle Division in the Army reserves and by July 1 the Corps was in the front line with the addition of the 77th Guards Rifle Division. On June 26 General Erastov had been transferred to command of the 46th Rifle Corps, and was replaced in command of the division by Col. Dmitrii Kuzmich Malkov, who would remain in command for the duration of the war.

=== Operation Kutuzov ===
The Soviet offensive against the German-held salient centered on the city of Oryol began with limited, local reconnaissance thrusts on July 11 with the full assault beginning the next day, just as Hitler was deciding to shut down Operation Citadel. Following a three-hour artillery preparation three armies of Bryansk Front, including the 61st, plus the 11th Guards Army of Western Front, attacked against three sectors on the northern flank of the salient. 61st Army was still on the Bolkhov sector, now facing the German 208th Infantry Division with four rifle divisions in the first echelon. By evening the Soviet troops had managed to advance 5–6km. 11th Guards Army made much more substantial progress in the early going and on July 18 the Soviet command committed the fresh 25th Tank Corps into that Army's sector at Ulyanovo but instead of driving into the open gap between two German army corps most of the 25th Tank was directed towards Bolkhov, which was still in German hands until it was liberated, mostly by units of 61st Army, on July 28. On the same day Gen. W. Model gave the order for his combined 2nd Panzer and 9th Armies to prepare to withdraw to the Hagen position at the base of the salient. In mid-August the forces of Bryansk Front attempted to break through to Karachev but only succeeded after the German forces withdrew further west. On August 18 their withdrawal to the Hagen line was completed.

== Into Belarus ==
61st Army was advancing on Bryansk in the late summer before it was moved to the Reserve of the Supreme High Command by the beginning of September. By the start of the next month it had been moved once again to Central Front where the 12th Guards rejoined 9th Guards Corps as the campaign moved into Belarus. In the last days of September the Army arrived along the Dniepr River on a broad front extending from Loev to south of Liubech, and the division seized a small bridgehead on the western bank in the latter vicinity; its Corps-mates, the 76th and 77th Guards, failed to do likewise farther south. On September 28 and again on October 2 General Belov attempted to expand the 12th Guards' bridgehead with the help of the two other divisions against the positions of the German 251st and 86th Infantry Divisions but only managed an advance of a further 2–3km before being halted by strong artillery and machine-gun fire from the dominating heights west of the river.

=== Gomel - Rechitsa Offensive ===
In preparation for the Gomel-Rechitsa Offensive Central Front underwent a major regrouping from October 8–14, during which 9th Guards Corps was fully concentrated in the bridgehead. It was to form the 61st Army's shock group along with the 29th Rifle Corps, backed by the 89th Rifle Corps from positions south of Liubech, when the offensive began on October 15. 9th Guards Corps was supported by a heavy artillery barrage by 4th Artillery Penetration Corps following which the 12th Guards, with the 29th Guards Regiment on the right, the 37th in the center and the 32nd on the left, assaulted and broke through the positions of 251st Infantry and seized Hill 114.0, a vital position that dominated the Soviet enclave, by the end of the day. The two other Guards divisions expanded the bridgehead on both flanks and the 81st Rifle Division of 29th Corps crossed the Dniepr to the right of 77th Guards. By the end of October 18 the bridgehead had been expanded to 20km wide and 4–5km deep, but due to its still-limited size and irregular configuration Belov was unable to commit his mobile forces (7th Guards Cavalry Corps and 9th Tank Corps) and the arrival of 2nd Panzer Division from the Chernobyl region managed to contain the attack.

On October 20 the commander of the just-renamed Belorussian Front, Army Gen. K. K. Rokossovsky, ordered Belov to regroup his Army and resume his attack on October 22. Accordingly Belov shifted his 9th Guards Corps northward from its bridgehead west of Liubech into 29th Corps' smaller bridgehead opposite Novaia and Staraia Lutava, situated 4–7km north of Liubech precisely at the boundary between the 251st and 7th Infantry Divisions. 29th Corps then concentrated in a smaller bridgehead south of Radul on 9th Guards right flank. The objective was to link up with 65th Army farther north and then to exploit northwestward towards Kalinkavichy and Mazyr. Heavy fighting raged for more than a week, prompting German 2nd Army to order its Group Lubbe to begin a phased withdrawal to new positions in the rear. 9th Guards Corps seized Novaia and Staraia Lutava on October 23 and then with the assistance of 29th Corps advanced more than 10km westward from Radul and linked up with 65th Army near the village of Nikolaevka. However by October 30 both Armies had "shot their bolt"; although both sides took considerable losses the Soviets had not been able to achieve a clean operational breach. Rokossovsky halted the attacks on November 1.

The Armies regrouped again over the next eight days before renewing the assault on November 10. General Belov again chose to lead with the 9th Guards Corps, now supported by 89th Corps on its left flank. 12th Guards and 77th Guards Divisions were in the first echelon with 68th Tank Brigade while the 76th Guards was in second echelon, all in the Borshchovka–Kuchaevka sector. The two Corps faced the 7th and 137th Infantry Divisions, both operating as battlegroups. In the first three days 65th Army tore an 8–12km gap in the German lines and was almost halfway to Rechitsa, which was liberated on November 15. 9th Guards Corps made less spectacular progress, but by November 13 had forced the defenders to withdraw to new lines 20km to the west; furthermore the advance of 65th Army had unhinged all the defenses of Army Group Center in southern Belarus and under continuing pressure further withdrawals were inevitable. By November 20 the defenders had been reinforced from other sectors but were still sagging under pressure from 9th Guards and 89th Corps.

...Rokossovsky's [forces] had turned west behind Rechitsa toward Kalkinovichi, the railroad junction controlling all of the Second Army supply lines. On November 20 Weiss shifted two of the divisions that had taken part in the counterattack west, to screen Kalinkovichi... The next morning Weiss reported that Soviet tanks and cavalry with strong infantry support were within 19 miles [30km] of Kalinkovichi. If they took the town the army would be out of motor fuel in two days and out of ammunition in four.

On November 22 Rokossovsky launched his Front on a renewed offensive that included the 9th Guards Corps, backed by the 68th Tanks, 9th Tank and 2nd Cavalry Corps, in an attack that shattered the German front south of Malodusha and started a sweep to the southwest that threatened to envelop German 2nd Army's right flank. The assault split apart the German 216th and 102nd Infantry Divisions and opened an immense gap in their defenses that allowed lead elements to reach Dubrovitsa on the Rechitsa–Khoiniki road by day's end. That afternoon Hitler finally accepted the inevitable and finally allowed Weiss to take his front back to a line just east of Kalinkavichy. The ensuing withdrawal lasted six days during which the two Soviet rifle corps and supporting units made spectacular progress, swinging southward and then westward through the Sholb Swamp and reaching as far as 45km east of Mazyr. Only the last-minute arrival of elements of 4th and 5th Panzer Divisions prevented the fall of Kalinkavichy; 9th Guards Corps and 7th Cavalry Corps were finally halted 12km east of there on November 28.

Meanwhile, Gomel had been evacuated by German 9th Army and liberated by the right-flank forces of Belorussian Front on November 26. By now most Soviet rifle divisions were reduced to 3,500 to 4,500 personnel each and a break for rebuilding and replenishment was necessary. Rokossovsky attempted a new offensive on Kalinkavichy on December 8 with 61st and 65th Armies but this made almost no progress and was called off on the 12th.

=== Kalinkovichi-Mozyr Offensive ===
Nearly a month passed until a new effort to liberate Mazyr and Kalinkavichy began on January 8, 1944. Once again the 9th Guards Corps was to lead the 61st Army's attack with 12th Guards in the center and the other two Guards divisions on each flank. Colonel Malkov later described the Corps' mission and the German defenses:

Corps Group "E", 5th Panzer Division [in fact, only one battalion], and 292nd Infantry Division were defending opposite 9th Guards Rifle Corps' front. The forward edge of the Germans' defenses, which extended 200-300 meters east of the Osipova Rudnia and Aleksandrovka road, were covered with barbed wire obstacles and, in some sectors, antitank and antipersonnel minefields. Pillboxes were constructed for firing points and bunkers with strong cover for the personnel. The villages of Aleksandrovka and Golevitsy Station were organized into powerful strongpoints.

The 292nd, in common with most of the German divisions, was at the strength of a reinforced regiment and Corps Group "E" was a composite of remnants of even weaker divisions. Using the 356th Rifle Division as a screen, General Belov had the Corps regrouped somewhat southward with the mission of penetrating the German defense and advancing to the west to capture Kalinkavichy in concert with 65th Army advancing from the north and northeast. The Corps would again be supported by 68th Tanks as well as the SU-76s of the 1459th SU Regiment. 61st Army also had the support of the 6th Artillery Penetration Division and 1st Tank Destroyer Brigade. At the insistence of Belov, Colonel Malkov had deployed his division in a single echelon with all three rifle regiments in line, leaving him with very few reserves. The attack began at dawn on January 8 after a 45-minute artillery preparation. The division captured the forward trenches of the 292nd Division's defenses and advanced 1.5–2km before being halted by intense German fire. The 77th Guards on the division's right gained about 2km before also being halted, while the 76th Guards was stopped in its tracks; both had also been deployed in a single line. Malkov wrote:

Despite launching attacks both during the day and at night, from 8 through 11 January, the corps' formations were not able to penetrate the enemy's defenses. Since each and every attack was preceded by and artillery preparation, in this case it represented a signal to the enemy, forewarning them of the attack... Over the course of three days, they launched 19 counterattacks, mainly from the region of Hill 128.4, where they committed fresh reinforcements at the boundary between the 77th and 12th Guards Rifle Divisions. The subunits of these divisions turned out to be in flat, open and swampy terrain, where there was no cover... Several times each day... Belov... demanded insistently that our troops penetrate the enemy's defense and capture Kalinkovichi at all cost. However, these demands did not alter the situation. Reserves were needed... and beside the ski battalions, there were no reserves in the divisions.

On January 12 General Rokossovsky intervened to demand the use of a more imaginative approach. By this time 65th Army was advancing from the north after similar initial difficulties, and three Guards cavalry corps had made a spectacular advance south of the Pripyat River which made the German position untenable.

Overnight on January 12/13 each division's ski battalion began infiltrating through the German defenses. There was no artillery preparation; instead the divisions concentrated their direct and mortar fire on narrow sectors to suppress German fire and the guns were reserved to hit targets identified by the advancing skiers who were mostly armed with machine guns, sub-machine guns and light mortars. After 15–20 minutes the main forces of the divisions went into the attack, by which time the 12 Guards' ski battalion was already 2km deep and had cut the road from Buda and Kalinkavichy. Just as the ski detachments were beginning their operation the 292nd and 7th Divisions had been ordered back to new lines and the next day the German XX Army Corps ordered all its units to fall back to the Ipa River line. At 0400 hours on January 14 the 1st Guards Tank Corps entered the northern outskirts of the city and joined hands with 12th Guards which had just entered from the east. That evening Mazyr was liberated by the 15th Guards Cavalry and the 55th and 415th Rifle Divisions.

==== Ozarichi - Ptich Offensive ====
Rokossovsky almost immediately began a new drive to the west although there is little information on it in the historical record. The 12th Guards divisional history states:

Units of the division entered battle northwest of Kalinkovichi on 20 January and, after smashing enemy resistance, began a slow but persistent advance forward. In February the corps' forces reached the Ptich River in the Ivashkovichi region and, by order of the army commander, went on the defense.

Based on German staff maps the 9th Guards Corps entered combat early on January 26 with the 76th and 77th Guards in first echelon and the 12th Guards in second, although this is not entirely clear from the maps alone. The Corps passed through the lines of 89th Rifle Corps and attacked towards XX Corps' second defensive line, anchored on Svobodka No. 1 Sovkhoz in the rear of 5th Panzer Division. Although the withdrawing 5th Panzer ultimately contained the attackers short of the Ptich it was clear that the remaining defenses of XX Corps on the lower Ipa were no longer tenable and late on January 27 General Weiss ordered it back to a new line along the Ptich. Later in February the 61st Army was reassigned to the 2nd Belorussian Front (1st formation) and remained on much the same lines through the spring, before rejoining Rokossovsky's renamed 1st Belorussian Front in April.

== Operation Bagration ==
The main part of offensive against Army Group Center began on June 23, but the left flank forces of 1st Belorussian Front did not enter the fighting until early July. As of the first of that month 61st Army consisted of just six rifle divisions and 9th Guards Corps had just the 12th Guards and 212th Rifle Divisions. Furthermore the Army was badly stretched out along the Pripyat and was facing a German grouping in and around Polesye. Its first efforts to begin active operations during July 3–5 were not successful. On the 7th the 9th Guards Corps began an attack towards Pinsk while the 89th Corps, along with the Dniepr Flotilla, began to press along the Pripyat from the east to the west. The adjacent 28th Army launched an attack with one division on Luninets and the German forces began to hurriedly retreat to the west. On July 14 the division shared in the liberation of Pinsk and was given its name as an honorific:

"PINSK" - 12th Guards Rifle Division (Colonel Malkov, Dmitrii Kuzmich)... The troops who participated in the liberation of Pinsk, by the order of the Supreme High Command of 14 July 1944, and a commendation in Moscow, are given a salute of 20 artillery salvoes from 224 guns.

=== Brest - Siedlce Offensive ===
On July 17 the Front began a drive towards Brest and Siedlce as the offensive began to slow due to logistics and German reinforcements. 61st Army launched its main attack with its right flank in the direction of Strigovo and Chernavchitsi and aided by the success of the left flank of 28th Army broke through the German defense along the Mukhavets River and on July 20 captured the major rail and road junction of Kobryn. In recognition on July 25 the 12th Guards was decorated with the Order of the Red Banner, while the 29th (Lt. Col. Ivan Petrovich Mokhov) and 37th Rifle Regiments (Lt. Col. Ivan Stepanovich Kolesnikov) and the 31st Artillery Regiment (Col. Daniil Afanasevich Avralov) all received the town's name as a battle honor.

Later on July 20 the bulk of 61st Army was removed to the Reserve of the Supreme High Command but due to still-stubborn German resistance Rokossovsky was authorized to retain 9th Guards Corps to assist the 28th and 70th Armies in the ongoing offensive towards Brest. Over the next four days of heavy fighting the Corps managed to advance from 16–20 km due west and there appeared to be a developing opportunity to encircle the German Brest grouping. On July 25 and 26 the Corps continued advancing slowly while repelling counterattacks while 70th Army's right flank broke through the first positions of the Brest fortified area. By the end of July 27 the Corps was on a line from Zadworce to Wulka-Zastavska and Brest was encircled while the German force was seeking at any price to break out. The town and fortress were both liberated the next day and only small groups of defenders managed to break out to the west while most were captured or destroyed in the woods west of the town. The 12th Guards received considerable recognition for its part in the victory; 32nd Rifle Regiment (Lt. Col. Nikolai Terentevich Volkov) was given "Brest" as an honorific, while the other three regiments were all awarded the Order of the Red Banner on August 10. Soon afterwards the 9th Guards Corps rejoined 61st Army in the Reserve of the Supreme High Command.

== Baltic Campaign ==
61st Army returned to the front in September, now in the 3rd Baltic Front. As of the middle of the month the division was in the area of Aluksne in Latvia. By the beginning of October it had advanced westward past Valmiera in the direction of Riga. On October 31 the 12th Guards was awarded the Order of Suvorov, 2nd Degree, for its part in the occupation of that city. When 3rd Baltic was disbanded shortly after Riga was taken the Army was reassigned to 1st Baltic Front until nearly the end of November. On November 29 the commander of the 1st Belorussian Front received the following:

"By order of the Supreme Commander-in-Chief, the following are being transferred to you by railroad:... b) 61st Army, consisting of:... 9th Guards Rifle Corps (12th and 75th Guards Rifle and 415th Rifle Divisions)... along with reinforcements, service establishments and rear organs. The army will arrive approximately between 9 December and 1 January at the Lukow station."

A further directive on December 7 ordered that the personnel strength of the Army's nine rifle divisions be reinforced to 6,500 men each, as well as 900 horses.

== Into Poland and Germany ==
In the plan for the Vistula-Oder offensive the task of finally liberating Warsaw fell to the 47th Army (attacking from the north), 1st Polish Army, and two corps of 61st Army (from the south). After reaching and clearing the northern bank of the Pilica River that force was to move in the direction of Błonie), while the 9th Guards Corps was to help clear a path for the commitment of 2nd Guards Tank Army on the third day and then advance towards Sochaczew. When the offensive began at 0855 hours on January 14, 1945 after a 25-minute artillery preparation the Army's forward battalions were halted by German fire in front of the switch position along the line of the Pilica and could not force a crossing. An additional two-hour preparation (which was supplemented by all the artillery on the 3rd Shock Army), and the commitment of the Army's main forces at 1100 hours was required to overcome resistance. As a result the 61st advanced only 2–4 km during the day. Once the breakthrough was achieved and 2nd Guards Tank entered the battle progress increased rapidly and the 415th Division led 9th Guards Corps into Sochaczew on January 18.

On January 26 the commander of 1st Belorussian Front, Marshal G. K. Zhukov, reported to the STAVKA on his plans to develop the offensive and to force the Oder River. 61st Army was directed towards Schloppe and Berlinchen, reaching the Oder on the sixth day and subsequently forcing a crossing. Subsequently in mid-February the Army was one of those shifted northward towards Stargard in reaction to the German Operation Solstice.

=== Berlin Operation ===
In the buildup to the offensive on Berlin in April the 61st Army was deployed on the east bank of the Oder from Nipperwiese to Alt Rudnitz. The Army was to launch its main attack with its left flank, forcing the river along a 2.5 km sector from Hohenwutzow to Neuglitzen. The 12th Guards was one of six divisions, including the rest of 9th Guards and the 89th Rifle Corps, grouped along the axis of the main attack. Within its Corps, the division was in the first echelon with the 75th Guards while the 415th Division was in second echelon. Although the main offensive began on April 16, 61st Army did not attack until the next day, when it won a bridgehead 3 km wide and up to 1,000m deep. By the 22nd the Army had cleared the Oder and Alte Oder and had turned its front completely to the north; three days later it had reached points 55 km west of the Oder. On April 29 it forced the Havel River in the area of Zehdenick against minimal resistance. Finally, on May 2, having advanced 60 km during the day against no resistance, it reached the Elbe River in the area of Havelberg, and the next day met up with elements of the U.S. 84th Infantry Division near Gnefsdorf.

== Postwar ==
When the fighting stopped the division held the full title of 12th Guards Rifle, Pinsk, Order of the Red Banner, Order of Suvorov Division. (Russian: 12-я гвардейская стрелковая Пинская Краснознамённая ордена Суворова дивизия). In a final round of awards for the Berlin operation all four regiments of the division received decorations on May 28: the Order of Bogdan Khmelnitsky, 2nd Degree, went to the 31st Guards Artillery; the 32nd Guards Rifle got the Order of Kutuzov, 3rd Degree; and the 29th and 37th Guards Rifle each received the Order of Suvorov, 3rd Degree. Maj. Gen. Nikolai Fedorovich Andonev, former commander of the recently disbanded 397th Rifle Division, took over the division in July and remained in command until February, 1946. Despite its distinguished record the 12th Guards was disbanded in July.
