= 336th Rifle Division =

336th Rifle Division (August, 1941 – July, 1945)
- Active: 1941–1945
- Country: Soviet Union
- Branch: Red Army
- Type: Infantry
- Size: Division
- Engagements: Battle of Moscow; Battles of Rzhev; Battle of Smolensk (1943); Battle of the Dniepr; Battle of Kiev (1943); Zhitomir–Berdichev Offensive; Lvov-Sandomierz Offensive; Vistula-Oder Offensive; Prague Offensive
- Decorations: Order of the Red Banner; Order of Suvorov 2nd class
- Battle honours: Zhitomir

Commanders
- Notable commanders: Col. Grigorii Mikhailovich Shapovalov; Col. Nikolai Nikolaievich Solovev; Maj. Gen. Vladimir Stepanovich Kuznetsov; Col. Maksim Arsentevich Ignachev; Col. Lazar Vasilevich Grinvald-Mukho; Maj. Gen. Mikhail Fyodorovich Borisov

The 336th Rifle Division was formed in August, 1941, as a standard Red Army rifle division in the Volga Military District. After additional training and equipping in the Moscow Military District it was assigned to 5th Army and went directly into the winter counteroffensive in mid-December. It fought in the battles around Rzhev in the summer and winter of 1942, taking heavy casualties for little gain. In spring of 1943 the division began shifting southwards, campaigning in southeastern Belorussia in the autumn and then moving into the northern Ukraine. On the last day of 1943 the 336th was recognized for its role in the second liberation of Zhitomir and was awarded that city's name as an honorific. During 1944 it continued to advance from western Ukraine into Poland, and in the last month of the war joined 4th Ukrainian Front's advance into Czechoslovakia, gaining additional honors along the way. The division continued to serve briefly into the postwar period.

== Formation ==
The division began forming at Melekess in the Volga Military District in August, 1941. Its order of battle was as follows:

- 1128th Rifle Regiment
- 1130th Rifle Regiment
- 1132nd Rifle Regiment
- 909th Artillery Regiment

Col. Grigorii Mikhailovich Shapovalov took command of the division on September 13, a position he would hold until his suicide in December. As with the 334th Rifle Division, the 336th moved to Gorkii, in 60th Reserve Army, to complete its training and equipping, as best as could be done under the circumstances.

=== Battle of Moscow ===
On December 9 the division arrived just west of Moscow to join 5th Army in Western Front, and went right into the offensive against Army Group Center. This introduction to battle did not go well, and Shapovalov lost control of his men, leading to a disorderly retreat. Overwhelmed by his responsibility, Shapovalov took his own life on December 15. The division came under command of Col. Nikolai Nikolaievich Solovev until March 29, 1942, during which time the command stabilized.

5th Army issued orders on the same day for the division to form a shock group with the 19th and 329th Rifle Divisions to attack from the line Terekhovo - Velkino - Gorbovo - Lyzlovo westward in the direction of Ruza. On December 20 the 336th, backed by the 20th Tank Brigade and 136th Independent Tank Battalion, broke into Ruza and became involved in street fighting with the enemy. However, heavy counterattacks followed the next day, throwing the division and its armor support out of the town. 5th Army renewed its offensive on the night of January 5–6, 1942, but the 336th was limited to a diversionary role while 32nd Rifle Division led the attack. This produced a breakthrough by January 9. Dorokhovo was taken on the morning of January 14, and 19th Rifle Division was left facing Ruza while the 329th and 336th advanced to outflank the town from the left. Facing the threat of encirclement, the German forces fell back westward, and Ruza was finally liberated on January 17.

As a result of this fighting the division was gutted, and on the same day received reinforcements from the 43rd Rifle Brigade and was withdrawn into the reserves of Western Front for rebuilding. In February it was back at the front, in 50th Army of Western Front, where it remained until June. Colonel Solovev was briefly succeeded in command by Maj. A. G. Dobrinskii until April 15, when Maj. Gen. Vladimir Stepanovich Kuznetsov took command of the division, a post he would hold until July 1, 1943, when he moved on to command of 40th Rifle Corps.

== Battles of Rzhev ==
From June, 1942 until March, 1943, the division was assigned and reassigned among several armies within Western Front. From August to December it saw action in both the First and the Second Rzhev-Sychyovka Offensive Operations while serving in 31st Army. While 31st Army gained some successes in the summer offensive, the story was quite different come November. The plan for Operation Mars called for the divisions on the left flank of the Army to support the main thrust of 20th Army towards Sychyovka by attacking through the valleys of the Vazuza and Osuga Rivers. The 88th, 336th and 239th Rifle Divisions (north to south) would be supported by the 32nd and 145th Tank Brigades. But when the attack opened on November 24 it was a costly failure. In spite of an apparently effective artillery preparation the defenses of the German 102nd Infantry Division remained largely intact, and inflicted infantry casualties of as much as 50 percent on the attackers, while also decimating the tank brigades, and effectively ended 31st Army's participation in the offensive. In one day of combat, the 336th lost 749 men killed and 2,297 wounded, for a total of 2,946, among the highest casualties in Operation Mars in such a short period of time.

== Into Ukraine ==
In early 1943 the 336th was assigned to 20th Army while rebuilding from its Rzhev debacle. In March it was reassigned to 61st Army in Bryansk Front, the start of a southwards trend of the division's combat path. General Kuszetsov was succeeded by Col. Maksim Arsentevich Ignachev on July 2. After fighting through the summer in the offensive to liberate Smolensk, 61st Army went into the Reserve of the Supreme High Command in late August, and then into Central Front.

By September 30 the 336th had been assigned to the 89th Rifle Corps, along with the 356th and 415th Rifle Divisions. On that date, as Central Front continued its drive to the Dniepr, 89th Corps reached the river south of Radul, but was unable to gain a bridgehead on the west bank due to strong German resistance and well-organized artillery and mortar fire. Between October 8 and 14 the Front carried out a major regrouping to prepare for further crossing operations, and the division was ordered, with its Corps, into new positions south of Liubech. Prior to the start of Belorussian (former Central) Front's Gomel–Rechitsa Offensive in early November, the 336th and the 415th, along with their Liubech sector, were transferred out of 89th Corps and into 13th Army of 1st Ukrainian Front. A further move later that month took the division to the 15th Rifle Corps in 60th Army. It would remain under those two commands for the duration, and in 1st Ukrainian Front until the last month of the war. In December, while fighting against the German counterattack west of Kiev, each rifle regiment of the division organized a "tank fighter" group made up of three sappers, and two sections of 3 - 5 men each armed with Molotov cocktails and anti-tank mines for last-ditch close combat antitank work. In late December, despite this heavy fighting, the division had about 7,000 officers and men in the ranks, with an average of 100 men per rifle company, a very respectable strength for a rifle division at that stage of the war.

On December 31, the division was recognized for its role in the second liberation of Zhitomir as follows:

"ZHITOMIR" - 336 Rifle Division (Colonel Ignachev, Maxim Arsentevich)... the troops who participated in the liberation of Zhitomir, by the order of the Supreme High Command of 1 January 1944, and a commendation in Moscow, are given a salute of 20 artillery salvos from 224 guns.

In the following months the 336th continued with its Army in clearing western Ukraine, helping to liberate Rovno and Lutsk and other towns and cities, in the process of which, by March, 1944, the rifle companies were down to about 80 men each, 30 of which formed a submachine gun platoon in each company. For most of August the division was in the hands of Col. I. I. Petukhov until he was succeeded by Col. Lazar Vasilevich Grinvald-Mukho, who would remain in command until the last month of the war. On February 19, 1945, the division was recognized for its role in the capture of towns of Gleiwitz and Czekanów with the award of the Order of Suvorov, 2nd Class.

== Into Postwar ==
On April 4, Maj. Gen. Mikhail Fyodorovich Borisov took command of the division, which he would hold for the duration. At about the same time the division, along with the rest of 60th Army, was transferred to 4th Ukrainian Front. The soldiers of the division were in western Czechoslovakia when news came of the German surrender. Based on their record of service they carried the full title of 336th Rifle, Zhitomir, Order of Suvorov Division (Russian: 336-я стрелковая Житомирская ордена Суворова дивизия), and eight non-commissioned officers had been named Cavaliers of the Order of Glory. On May 28 it was further honored with the award of the Order of the Red Banner. The division was disbanded in the summer of 1945 with the Northern Group of Forces.
