= 61st Army =

- 61-я армия
- Active: 1941-1945
- Country: Soviet Union
- Branch: Red Army
- Size: Field army
- Part of: Bryansk Front
- Engagements: Operation Kutuzov; Operation Bagration; Riga Offensive of 1944; Courland Pocket; East Pomeranian Offensive; Battle of Berlin

Commanders
- Notable commanders: Fyodor Kuznetsov; Markian Popov; Pavel Alexeyevich Belov

The 61st Army (Russian: 61-я армия) was a field army of the Red Army and the Soviet Ground Forces. It was created in 1941 and disbanded in 1945. It took part in Operation Bagration and the Riga Offensive of 1944.

== Structure during the Battle of Kursk ==
During the Battle of Kursk the army was part of the Bryansk Front.

- 9th Guards Rifle Corps
  - 12th Guards Rifle Division
  - 76th Guards Rifle Division
  - 77th Guards Rifle Division
- 97th Rifle Division
- 110th Rifle Division
- 336th Rifle Division
- 356th Rifle Division
- 415th Rifle Division
- 12th Anti-Tank Artillery Brigade
- 68th Tank Brigade
- 36th Tank Regiment
- 1539th Self-Propelled Artillery Regiment
- 31st Railroad Armoured Regiment
- 45th Railroad Armoured Regiment
- 310th Engineer Battalion
- 344th Engineer Battalion
- 60th Guards Artillery Regiment
- 67th Guards Artillery Regiment
- 554th Artillery Regiment
- 547th Mortar Artillery Regiment
- 533rd Anti-Tank Artillery Regiment
- 1282nd Anti-Aircraft Artillery Regiment
- 13th Anti-Aircraft Artillery Division
  - 1065th Anti-Aircraft Artillery Regiment
  - 1173rd Anti-Aircraft Artillery Regiment
  - 1175th Anti-Aircraft Artillery Regiment
  - 1218th Anti-Aircraft Artillery Regiment

== Commanders ==
The following officers commanded the army:

- Colonel General Fyodor Kuznetsov (10 November–18 December 1941)
- Lieutenant General Markian Popov (18 December 1941–28 June 1942)
- Lieutenant General Pavel Belov (promoted to Colonel General 26 July 1944; 28 June 1942–after May 1945)
