= 415th Rifle Division =

- Active: 1941–1945
- Country: Soviet Union
- Branch: Red Army
- Type: Division
- Role: Infantry
- Engagements: Battle of Moscow; Defense of Tula; Battles of Rzhev; Operation Kutuzov; Battle of Smolensk (1943); Gomel-Rechitsa Offensive; Battle of Kiev (1943); Kalinkovichi-Mozyr Offensive; Operation Bagration; Lublin–Brest Offensive; Baltic Offensive; Riga Offensive; Vistula-Oder Offensive; East Pomeranian Offensive; Battle of Berlin
- Decorations: Order of the Red Banner; Order of Suvorov
- Battle honours: Mozyr

Commanders
- Notable commanders: Col. Georgii Aleksandrovich Latyshev; Maj. Gen. Pyotr Andreevich Aleksandrov; Col. Vasilii Nikitovich Zatylkin; Col. Vasilii Filippovich Samoplenko; Lt. Col. Georntii Nesterovich Tzitaishvili; Col. Pavel Ivanovich Moshchalkov

The 415th Rifle Division was formed as an infantry division of the Red Army in the autumn of 1941 in the Far Eastern Front. It was considered to be a "sister" division to the 413th, and was one of the divisions of Siberians sent west to help defend Moscow during the winter of 1941-42. It spent much of the next year in the same general area, west of the capital, taking part in the mostly futile battles against the German-held salient at Rzhev during late 1942. Following the evacuation of the salient in March, 1943 the 415th was assigned to the 61st Army, where it remained for most of the rest of the war. It took part in the summer offensives through western Russia and into eastern Belarus during the fall and winter, earning a battle honor in January, 1944. During the later stages of the next summer offensive, Operation Bagration, it distinguished itself in the liberation of Pinsk and was awarded the Order of the Red Banner. Following this it was redeployed northward, still in 61st Army, and took part in the offensives through the Baltic states. In the spring of 1945 the division also earned the Order of Suvorov, 2nd Degree, for its part in the capture of several towns in northeastern Germany. The 415th had a distinguished career as a combat unit, ending its combat path near Berlin, but was disbanded in the summer of 1945.

== Formation ==
The 415th Rifle Division began forming on September 8, 1941 at Vladivostok, in 25th Army on the Pacific coast. It appears to have begun forming as the "Voroshilov" Rifle Division before being assigned a divisional number. Its order of battle, based on the first wartime shtat (table of organization and equipment) for rifle divisions, was as follows:

- 1321st Rifle Regiment
- 1323rd Rifle Regiment
- 1326th Rifle Regiment
- 686th Artillery Regiment
- 292nd Antitank Battalion
- 311th Antiaircraft Battery (until June 30, 1943)
- 208th Reconnaissance Company
- 687th Sapper Battalion
- 611th Signal Battalion (later 772nd Signal Company)
- 346th Medical/Sanitation Battalion
- 348th Chemical Protection (Anti-gas) Company (later 211th)
- 329th Motor Transport Company (later 4th)
- 529th Field Bakery (later 336th)
- 172nd Divisional Veterinary Hospital
- 38th Field Postal Station (later 15315th, 15262nd)
- 3rd Field Office of the State Bank

Col. Georgii Aleksandrovich Latyshev was appointed to command on the day the division began forming. It was considered to be ready for combat by the end of October, and shipped out to the west as part of the Reserve of the Supreme High Command in the first days of November. It was one of six divisions transferred from Far Eastern Front to the fighting front from September to November. Contrary to the German understanding at the time, there were no wholesale transfers from the far east to the Moscow front. Prior to this move Colonel Latyshev left his command on November 1. Until mid-1943 this position would see a high rate of turnover, as follows:

- Maj. Gen. Pyotr Andreevich Aleksandrov (November 2, 1941 - March 2, 1942)
- Lt. Col. Grigorii Ivanovich Kanachadze (March 3 - April 22, 1942)
- Col. Nikolai Ivanovich Tuzov (April 23 - May 9, 1942)
- Lt. Col. Nikolai Alexeevich Krymskii (May 10 - June 12, 1942)
- Col. Vasilii Nikitovich Zatylkin (June 13 - August 20, 1942)
- Col. Vasilii Filippovich Samoplenko (August 21 - December 11, 1942)
- Col. Aleksandr Ivanovich Golovanov (December 12, 1942 - January 1, 1943)
- Lt. Col. Georntii Nesterovich Tzitaishvili (January 2 - June 25, 1943)
- Col. Nikolai Kuzmich Maslennikov (June 26 - July 30, 1943)

== Battle of Moscow ==
The 415th was first assigned to 49th Army in Western Front, along with the 7th Guards Rifle Division, on November 10 in order to strengthen that Army's right flank. Beginning on November 14 these right-flank forces, along with the 2nd Cavalry Corps and the 112th Tank Division, fought a series of meeting engagements with German forces attempting to capture Serpukhov. The German attack was stymied at the cost of significant losses and a week later the Soviet units went over to the defensive. The division was specifically assigned to defend the sector from Sidorenki to Burinovskii station and prevent German tanks and infantry from breaking through in the direction of Burinovo and Kalugino. General Aleksandrov was ordered to prepare antitank strongpoints near Terekhun, the wooded area east of Burinovo, in the woods near Burinovskii station, Stanki station and near Kalugino; in addition a switch position was to be constructed along the northern bank of the Nara River along the sector from Dubrovka to Butyrki and a rear position along a line from Shakhlovo to Kalugino. The front-line defenses were to be completed by December 1, with the second-line positions completed by December 5.

As of December 7, as the left wing of Western Front was preparing to go over to the counteroffensive, 49th Army had 5 rifle divisions (5th Guards, 415th, 60th, 194th and 238th) with 350 field and antitank guns, deployed on a 70 km-wide front. The 415th, on the Army's right (north) flank, faced the 137th Infantry Division east of Vysokinichi. The Army was to go over to a general offensive on the morning of December 16, largely with its left wing forces while the 5th Guards and 60th Divisions were to launch a supporting attack and the 415th was to tie down the German division with limited attacks to prevent reserves being transferred to the south. When the offensive began it faced resistance everywhere particularly on the right flank. 5th Guards and 60th made very little progress, while the left flank reached and crossed the Oka River by the 19th. On the same day the 415th and 5th Guards were ordered to continue their tying-down operations. During December 20–22 the division was defending with two regiments of the 60th along the line from Burinovskii station to the woods north of Ostrov. On December 24 it went over to the offensive and, operating in individual detachments, began slowly moving forward as German resistance weakened. By the morning of the 26th it reached a line from Kurkino to Troyanovo to Makarovo before again running into stubborn German resistance. On December 28 it liberated Makarovo and continued attacking to the west.

The 415th encountered the heaviest resistance along the Alozha River about 1 km west of Makarovo and after forcing a crossing its offensive developed more successfully. It took the village of Chernaya Gryaz with elements of the 60th Division and by the morning of December 30 had reached a line 5 km west of that village and continued advancing. The next day by order of Western Front the division was transferred to the adjacent 43rd Army, where it would remain until July. From January 1–9, 1942 the 415th cooperated with the 194th Rifle Division of 49th Army in overcoming German minefields and other obstacles and pressing on, reaching and capturing the villages of Afonasovo and Starosele on January 4, after which the 194th was also re-subordinated to 43rd Army. These left flank units, backed by the 18th Tank Brigade, were directed on Maloyaroslavets, which had been liberated on January 2.

On January 9 the 43rd Army issued orders to continue the offensive towards Medyn and Myatlevo. The objective was to "encircle and destroy the Kondrovo-Yukhnov-Medyn enemy group and develop the blow to the northwest." The Army was directed be fighting for the Medyn area by the end of January 10 and have possession of Myatlevo 24 hours later, and committed an airborne corps, four rifle divisions and two tank brigades to the effort. Given earlier losses, this amounted to about 15,000 infantry and sappers, 400 machine guns, about 100 mortars, 50 guns and up to 40 tanks. They faced the remnants of 29th Motorized and 10th Panzer Divisions covering the withdrawal of the XX Army Corps. On the first day the 415th reached Stanki where German forces resisted stubbornly. The advance continued on January 12 and during the next day the 5th Airborne encircled the garrison in Medyn, which broke out in small groups overnight towards Myatlevo with the loss of about 2,000 men and substantial equipment. As of January 15 the division was fighting unsuccessfully for the villages of Bogdanovo and Ivanishchevo along the Shanya River and the Army's drive bogged down along this line. As a result of several regroupings in an effort to surround the village by January 21 the division was the only one remaining facing Myatlovo. By this time the German forces were making more serious efforts to break out of their encirclement in the Yukhnov area. The capture of Myatlevo was vital to get into the retreating Germans' flank and rear, but the 415th was insufficient to the task. It was therefore reinforced with the 1st Guards Motorized Rifle Division from 33rd Army. A methodical attack brought the division to the approaches to the village on January 27, when the 1st Guards arrived. In the final attack plan the 415th was to demonstrate an envelopment from the left flank as a distraction, allowing the 1st Guards to mount a quick frontal blow and break in. The attack went according to plan and Myatlevo was in Soviet hands by 0400 hours on January 29. The division was left to mop up the German remnants while the 1st Guards pursued along the Warsaw highway.

While the winter offensive had served to eliminate the immediate threat to Moscow, the cost to the Red Army was high. By January, the character of the 415th as a Siberian unit had changed. Due to the influx of casualty replacements the division was noted in this month as being 70 percent Georgian.

=== Battles for Rzhev ===
The 415th was transferred to 20th Army, still in Western Front, in July, along the eastern face of the Rzhev Salient, then to the adjoining 29th Army in November, but in the last gasps of Operation Mars in December the division was ordered back to the 20th to help make one last desperate attempt to break the German positions and capture Sychyovka. On December 11 the relatively-fresh 415th made an attack on a 4km front between Bolshoe Kropotovo and Zherebtsovo alongside the 243rd, 247th and 30th Guards Rifle Divisions in the first echelon. The 415th, attacking in the Maloe Kropotovo and Podosinovka sectors, would be backed by the re-formed 6th Tank Corps with 100 tanks in two brigades to exploit once the division breached the German line. At 1100 hours the 22nd Tank Brigade, attacking in the wake of the division, penetrated west of Maloe Kropotovo but came under heavy German fire which stripped away the accompanying riflemen and knocked out about 25 tanks. The combined forces of the rifle divisions made scanty gains of 500 - 1,000 metres at significant cost, and failed to capture a single German-held fortified village. Three days later, the offensive was shut down for good. In the period from November 25 to December 18 the division lost 692 men killed and 1,865 wounded, for a total of 2,557 casualties.

== Into Western Russia and Belarus ==
In March, as the Soviet forces prepared for the 1943 summer campaign, the 415th was shifted south to the 61st Army in Bryansk Front; it would remain in this Army for most of the rest of the war. The Soviet offensive against the German-held salient centered on the city of Oryol began with limited, local reconnaissance thrusts on July 11 with the full assault beginning the next day, just as Hitler was deciding to shut down Operation Citadel. Following a three-hour artillery preparation three armies of Bryansk Front, including the 61st, plus the 11th Guards Army of Western Front, attacked against three sectors on the northern flank of the salient. 61st Army was still on the Bolkhov sector, now facing the German 208th Infantry Division with four rifle divisions in the first echelon. By evening the Soviet troops had managed to advance 5–6 km. 11th Guards Army made much more substantial progress in the early going and on July 18 the Soviet command committed the fresh 25th Tank Corps into that Army's sector at Ulyanovo but instead of driving into the open gap between two German army corps most of the 25th Tank was directed towards Bolkhov, which was still in German hands until it was liberated, mostly by units of 61st Army, on July 28. On the same day Gen. W. Model gave the order for his combined 2nd Panzer and 9th Armies to prepare to withdraw to the Hagen position at the base of the salient. In mid-August the forces of Bryansk Front attempted to break through to Karachev but only succeeded after the German forces withdrew further west. On August 18 their withdrawal to the Hagen line was completed. Shortly after Bolkhov was taken the 415th was subordinated to the 46th Rifle Corps and on August 1 Col. Pavel Ivanovich Moshchalkov took over command of the division, where he would remain for the duration of the war.

Later that month the 415th was reassigned to 89th Rifle Corps, and was advancing on Bryansk in the late summer before the entire 61st Army was moved to the Reserve of the Supreme High Command by the beginning of September. By the start of the next month it had been moved once again to Central Front as the campaign moved into Belarus. In late September the Army arrived along the Dniepr River on a broad front extending from Loev to south of Liubech, but the 89th Corps was unable to gain any footholds on the west bank due to strong German resistance and well-organized artillery and mortar fire. In preparation for the Gomel - Rechitsa Offensive Central Front underwent a major regrouping from October 8–14, during which 89 Corps was redeployed into new positions south of Liubech. However, it was the other two corps of 61st Army, (29th Rifle Corps and 9th Guards Rifle Corps) which were to form the shock group when the offensive began on October 22. In heavy fighting over the next week the Soviet attackers forced elements of German 2nd Army to make a phased withdrawal to new positions in the rear and advanced as much as 20 km, but neither of the primary objectives were taken.

On October 25 the 415th and its corps-mate the 336th Rifle Division were reassigned to the 28th Rifle Corps of 13th Army in 1st Ukrainian Front, in which it crossed the Dniepr and took part in the battles that liberated Kiev in November. As a result of this fighting the division had to be replenished with what the Germans called "booty Ukrainians"; for example, on December 17 the 415th received 550 new riflemen of all ages from Kiev and Zhitomir, with less than two months training in the 21st Reserve Regiment stationed at Chernobyl.

=== Kalinkovichi-Mozyr Offensive ===
In early January, 1944, the 415th returned to 61st Army, now in Belorussian Front. Planning was already underway for a new offensive in the direction of Kalinkovichi and Mozyr by the 61st and 65th Armies, with the 61st advancing along the swampy banks of the Pripyat River. It faced the 292nd and 102nd Infantry Divisions and Corps Detachment E of German XX Army Corps, all of which were significantly under strength from earlier losses. The 415th was deployed south of the Pripyat on the Army's left (south) flank opposite Corps Detachment E which held the extreme southern flank of Army Group Center. The division screened the regrouping of the 2nd and 7th Guards Cavalry Corps from the north; the cavalry was to advance through terrain thought to be impassable and outflank the German detachment. The 61st Army's main offensive began at dawn on January 8 after a 45-minute artillery preparation, but soon ran into stiff German resistance. Meanwhile, the 415th, in cooperation with local partisans, opened a gap on the German flank allowing the two cavalry corps and begin a raid deep into the rear in the direction of Mozyr.

Over the first two days the cavalry advanced as much as 75 km and rendered Corps Detachment E's positions utterly untenable. The STAVKA perceived an opportunity to smash the entire right flank of German 2nd Army and ordered the operation accelerated. As a result, the Front commander, Army Gen. K. K. Rokossovsky, took direct command of the two cavalry corps and ordered:

"While cooperating with 415th Rifle Division, continue pursuing the withdrawing enemy, encircle his rear service units with two divisions, and capture Mozyr, its railroad station, and the highway bridge over the Pripyat River."

However increasing German resistance brought the advance to a halt on January 11 and it became clear that Mozyr would not be taken by cavalry alone. On January 13 the 415th arrived to mount a joint assault with 7th Guards Cavalry but this "struck thin air" because Corps Detachment E had already begun its withdrawal, with just rearguards remain to delay the Soviet troops. On the evening of the next day the division along with the Mozyr Partisan Brigade, 15th Guards Cavalry and 55th Rifle Divisions cleared the town after a short street battle. and received its name as an honorific:

"MOZYR" - 415th Rifle Division (Colonel Moshchalkov, Pavel Ivanovich)... The troops who participated in the liberation of Mozyr and Kalinkovichi, by the order of the Supreme High Command of 14 January 1944, and a commendation in Moscow, are given a salute of 20 artillery salvoes from 224 guns.

In Belorussian Front's next operation, the Ozarichi-Ptich Offensive, the division played very little part, relieving the 2nd Guards Cavalry on January 18, freeing it up for active operations.

=== Operation Bagration ===
In February the 61st Army was moved to the 2nd Belorussian Front (1st formation) and the division made a brief return to 89th Rifle Corps, but a month later was reassigned to the 9th Guards Rifle Corps, where it would remain for most of the rest of the war. However, at the start of Operation Bagration the Army was in 1st Belorussian Front and the 415th was a separate division in that Army. 61st Army was part of the Front's western group of armies, still facing the German 2nd Army along the southern fringes of the Pripyat Marshes, and did not play an active role in the first phase of the offensive, acting as a follow-on force as the Germans retreated.

Before dawn on June 29 the Dniepr Flotilla's 2nd Brigade of river cutters landed forces of the 55th Rifle Division across the Pripyat River. Its bridgehead was broadened by the 23rd Rifle Division in subsequent landings. On July 3 the 415th, 397th and 212th Rifle Divisions attacked in support, but were unsuccessful. The Army's offensive on the Pinsk axis resumed on July 4 supported by several partisan detachments, fortified regions and the 55th Guards Rifle Division of 28th Army and began rolling up the German defenses along the northern bank of the Pripyat, Goryn and Styr rivers. In danger of encirclement, the German grouping was falling back to the west before the Army's right flank and center but was otherwise stubbornly defending the approaches to Luninets and Pinsk. By the end of July 9 the Army had advanced 85 km in five days and had reached the approaches to Luninets.

The Flotilla landed the main force of the 397th Division across the river on the night of July 10, and then delivered one battalion, as well as a regiment of the 415th, to the eastern outskirts of Pinsk on July 12/13. The city had been well fortified with full trenches, pillboxes and engineering obstacles. The outer line was held by the 216th Divisional Group and three worker battalions while the city itself was occupied by remnants of the 35th Infantry Division and the 17th Special Designation Brigade. On the night of July 13/14 the Army made a turning maneuver to attack the city from the north, south and east, with the help of the Dniepr Flotilla, and crushed German resistance, clearing the center by 0600 hours. By the end of July 16 it reached the line Khomsk to Ogdemer to Zhuravok, resulting in an advance of another 60 km over four days. For its role in the liberation of Pinsk the division was awarded the Order of the Red Banner on July 23, while the 1323rd (Maj. Georgii Andreevich Molchanov) and 1326th (Maj. Nikolai Pavlovich Kleshchin) Rifle Regiments were both granted its name as a battle honor. On July 28 the 1321st Regiment (Lt. Col. Ivan Yakovlevich Oleynik) was similarly honored for its role in the liberation of Brest. Shortly after these victories the entire 61st Army was moved to the Reserve of the Supreme High Command, where the division was again assigned to the 9th Guards Rifle Corps.

== Baltic Campaign ==
61st Army returned to the front in September, now in the 3rd Baltic Front. As of the middle of the month the division was in the area of Aluksne in Latvia. By the beginning of October it had advanced westward past Valmiera in the direction of Riga. When 3rd Baltic was disbanded shortly after Riga was taken the Army was reassigned to 1st Baltic Front until nearly the end of November. On November 29 the commander of the 1st Belorussian Front received the following:

"By order of the Supreme Commander-in-Chief, the following are being transferred to you by railroad:... b) 61st Army, consisting of:... 9th Guards Rifle Corps (12th and 75th Guards Rifle and 415th Rifle Divisions)... along with reinforcements, service establishments and rear organs. The army will arrive approximately between 9 December and 1 January at the Lukow station."

A further directive on December 7 ordered that the personnel strength of the Army's nine rifle divisions be reinforced to 6,500 men each, as well as 900 horses.

== Into Poland and Germany ==
The Army would remain in this Front for the duration. At the outset of the Vistula-Oder offensive, the 61st was deployed along the Vistula south of Warsaw. Once the breakthrough of the German lines had been accomplished, elements of the 415th, mounted on trucks or riding on the armored vehicles of 88th Guards Heavy Tank Regiment (IS-2 tanks) and 312th Guards SU Regiment (SU-100s), exploited into the enemy's rear as the Army's forward detachment. This detachment was recognized for its part in the liberation of Sochaczew on January 18, 1945. In this fashion it drove through almost to the Oder River in West Pomerania by the end of the operation.

In February the division was shifted to the 80th Rifle Corps, but returned to 9th Guards Corps in March. In the buildup to the offensive on Berlin in April the 61st Army was deployed on the east bank of the Oder from Nipperwiese to Alt Rudnitz. The Army was to launch its main attack with its left flank, forcing the river along a 2.5 km sector from Hohenwutzow to Neuglitzen. The 415th was one of six divisions, including the rest of 9th Guards and the 89th Rifle Corps, grouped along the axis of the main attack. Within its Corps, the division was in the second echelon while the 75th and 12th Guards were in first echelon. Although the main offensive began on April 16, 61st Army did not attack until the next day, when it won a bridgehead 3 km wide and up to 1,000m deep. By the 22nd the Army had cleared the Oder and Alte Oder and had turned its front completely to the north; three days later it had reached points 55 km west of the Oder. On April 29 it forced the Havel River in the area of Zehdenick against minimal resistance. Finally, on May 2, having advanced 60 km during the day against no resistance, it reached the Elbe River in the area of Havelberg, and the next day met up with elements of the U.S. 84th Infantry Division near Gnefsdorf.

For its actions in the capture of the north German towns of Stargard, Naugard, and Polzin the division received its final decoration, the Order of Suvorov, 2nd degree, on April 26. On the same date the 1321st and 1326th Rifle Regiments were awarded the Order of Alexander Nevsky for their parts in the battles for Gollnow, Stepenitz and Massow. Thus, the division ended the war with the full title of 415th Rifle Mozyr, Order of the Red Banner, Order of Suvorov Division. (Russian: 415-я стрелковая Мозырьская Краснознамённая ордена Суворова дивизия).

== Postwar ==
According to STAVKA Order No. 11095 of May 29, 1945, part 6, the 415th is listed as one of the rifle divisions to be "disbanded in place". It was disbanded in Germany in accordance with the directive during summer 1945.
