= Ognica, Gmina Widuchowa =

Ognica
- Village
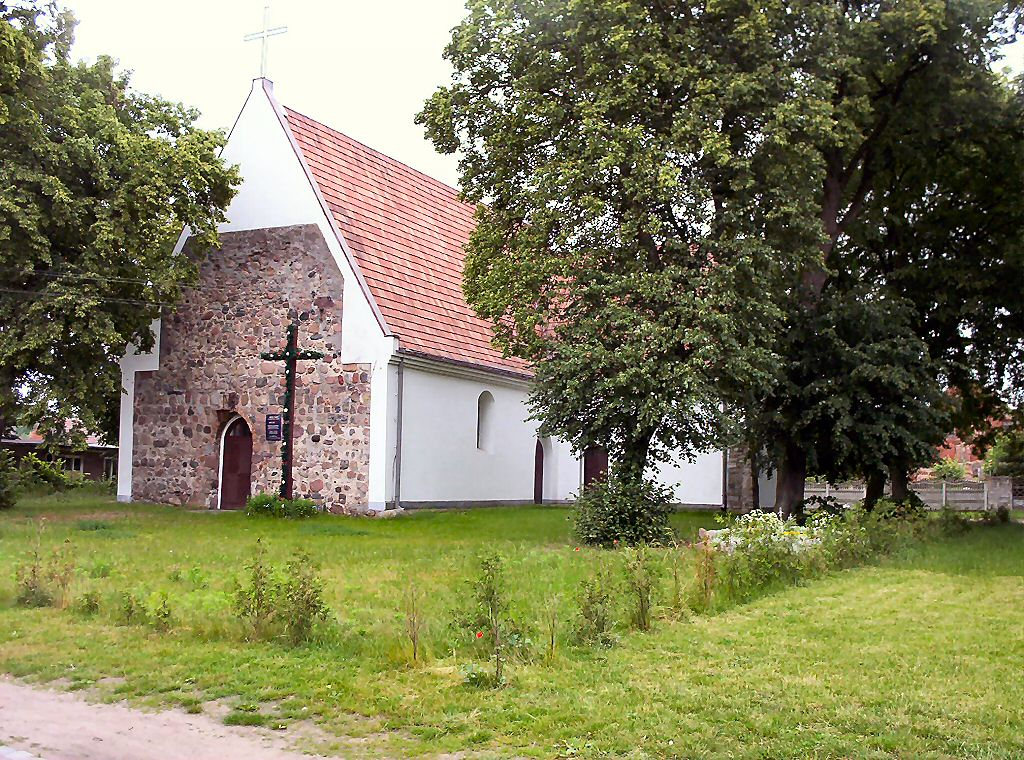
- Church in Ognica

- Location within Poland
- Coordinates: 53°04′40″N 14°22′14″E
- Country: Poland
- Voivodeship: West Pomeranian
- County: Gryfino
- Gmina: Widuchowa

Ognica [ɔɡˈnit͡sa] (German: Nipperwiese) is a village in the administrative district of Gmina Widuchowa, within Gryfino County, West Pomeranian Voivodeship, in north-western Poland, close to the German border.

For the history of the region, see History of Pomerania.
