= Rogachevo =

Rogachevo may refer to:

- Rogachevo, Bulgaria, a village in Dobrich Province, Bulgaria
- Rogachevo, Russia, several rural localities in Russia
- Rogachevo (air base), an air base on Novaya Zemlya, Russia
