= Bryastovo =

Bryastovo may refer to the following places in Bulgaria:

- Bryastovo, Dobrich Province
- Bryastovo, Haskovo Province
- Bryastovo, Sliven Province
