= 129th Rifle Division =

129th Rifle Division (August 1939 – November 23, 1941) 129th Rifle Division (January 19, 1942 – June 1946)
- Active: 1939–1946
- Country: Soviet Union
- Branch: Red Army (1939-46)
- Type: Infantry
- Size: Division
- Engagements: Operation Barbarossa; Battle of Smolensk (1941); Battle of Moscow; Demyansk Pocket; Demyansk Offensive (1943); Operation Kutuzov; Gomel-Rechitsa offensive Rahachow-Zhlobin offensive Operation Bagration; Bobruysk offensive Minsk offensive Vistula–Oder offensive East Prussian offensive Battle of Berlin; Battle of Halbe
- Decorations: Order of the Red Banner; Order of Kutuzov (both 2nd Formation)
- Battle honours: Oryol (2nd Formation)

Commanders
- Notable commanders: Kombrig Yakov Stepanovich Fokanov; Maj. Gen. Avksentii Mikhailovich Gorodnianskii; Maj. Gen. Vasilii Andreevich Smirnov; Maj. Gen. Ivan Vladimirovich Panchuk; Col. Andrei Antonovich Ukrainskii; Col. Yakov Artyomevich Romanenko

The 129th Rifle Division was first formed as an infantry division of the Red Army in August 1939 in the North Caucasus Military District, based on the shtat (table of organization and equipment) of the following month. It remained in that District until just before the German invasion began in June 1941, when it was moving by rail through eastern Ukraine to join the 19th Army of Western Front near Vitebsk. On its approach to the fighting front in early July it became strung out along the roads and never made effective contact before the 19th was largely destroyed, so it fell back toward Smolensk where it was reassigned to 16th Army. During the following weeks it fought a series of see-saw battles for the northern part of the city while 16th Army was within a deep pocket. By the end of the month it was clear that Smolensk could not be retaken and the badly depleted division was able to escape, soon being reassigned to 20th Army. After being somewhat replenished it took part in several unsuccessful offensive actions from late August into early September, largely along the Ustrom River. When the German offensive on Moscow was renewed in early October it was still holding near Smolensk; it did not come under direct attack but was deeply encircled and had to withdraw over 100km without adequate communications or supplies. Only several hundred men escaped, not sufficient to allow it to be rebuilt, and it was disbanded in late November.

The 2nd Moscow Rifle Division began forming in October from worker's regiments in that city, now under immediate threat following Operation Typhoon. Once formed a few weeks later it took up fortified positions in the Moscow Defence Zone near Khimki until January 1942 when it was redesignated as the new 129th Rifle Division. It was soon assigned to 1st Shock Army and began moving north to join Northwestern Front in the vicinity of Demyansk in February. During the following 13 months it remained there, containing and attacking the German forces pocketed there, eventually as part of the Front's 53rd Army. In March 1943, following the German evacuation, the division entered the Reserve of the Supreme High Command and moved south, being assigned to Bryansk Front's 63rd Army north of the German 9th Army's salient around Oryol. When that city was taken on August 5 the 129th was awarded one of the Red Army's first battle honors. After Bryansk was taken in September the Front of that name was disbanded and the division moved, with 63rd Army, to Central Front. During the winter it fought in eastern Belarus, moving to 3rd Army of what was now 1st Belorussian Front in February 1944. Under these commands it fought in the summer offensive against Army Group Center, helping to defeat 9th Army again in and around Babruysk before exploiting this victory toward Minsk and eventually across the old Polish border. For its part in the capture of Białystok it was awarded the Order of the Red Banner. During the following winter offensive into Poland and East Prussia, as part of 2nd and then 3rd Belorussian Fronts, it was also decorated with the Order of Kutuzov, while its major subunits won decorations as well. In April 1945 it was moved across eastern Germany to rejoin 1st Belorussian Front in preparation for the final offensive on Berlin, being detached to 33rd Army initially. After clearing Frankfurt-on-Oder it rejoined 3rd Army and fought to destroy the encircled 9th Army southwest of the German capital. Following this it advanced to the Elbe in early May, joining hands with US Army forces. The next month it was loaded up to return to the USSR, and it was disbanded at Polotsk in June 1946.

== 1st Formation ==
The division was formed at Stalingrad in the North Caucasus Military District in August 1939. Kombrig Yakov Stepanovich Fokanov, who had previously led the 61st Rifle Division, was soon assigned to command, but he left this post in January 1940 to take command of the 18th Reserve Brigade. From July to October it was led by Maj. Gen. Nikifor Gordeevich Khoruzhenko, but on October 25 he left to complete his military education and was replaced by Maj. Gen. Avksentii Mikhailovich Gorodnianskii. At the time of the German invasion on June 22, 1941, the division's order of battle was as follows:

- 438th Rifle Regiment (until November 13, 1941)
- 457th Rifle Regiment (until November 9, 1941)
- 518th Rifle Regiment
- 664th Artillery Regiment
- 37th Antitank Battalion
- 210th Antiaircraft Battalion
- 192nd Reconnaissance Company (later 192nd Battalion)
- 40th Sapper Battalion
- 276th Signal Battalion
- 196th Medical/Sanitation Battalion
- 52nd Chemical Defense (Anti-gas) Company
- 212th Motor Transport Battalion
- 152nd Field Bakery
- 829th Field Postal Station
- 38th Field Office of the State Bank

At this time it was assigned to 19th Army's 34th Rifle Corps, along with the 158th and 171st Rifle Divisions.

== Battle of Smolensk ==
On the day of the German invasion the division was located in the areas of Cherkasy and Bila Tserkva. 19th Army was under command of Lt. Gen. I. S. Konev, and was soon redirected toward the Vitebsk area, where it arrived in piecemeal fashion over several days. In a lengthy after-action report prepared on July 24 by Konev's chief of staff, Maj. Gen. P. N. Rubtsov, the circumstances of this arrival were described in part:

1. Forces of 25th Rifle Corps were mobilized at the moment they took the field. 34th Rifle Corps forces were only in a state of reinforced combat readiness. The divisions were brought up to only 12,000 men, but were not fully mobilized.
In the field the 12,000-man divisions experienced immense difficulties because of an absence of transport and were unable to maneuver. They could not pick up up required quantities of ammunition, could not carry mortars, etc.
2. The artillery arrived late because [it] had arrived in the Kiev region in the first trains and were the first to occupy firing positions in the former deployment region...

Rubtsov went on to note deficiencies in command and control, especially in the use of radio; lack of rear services and reserves; and insufficient reconnaissance. All these would be reflected in the coming battle.

The 171st was transferred to Southwestern Front, and was replaced in the Corps' order of battle by the 38th Rifle Division. The 129th officially entered the fighting forces on July 2, when 19th Army became part of Western Front. In a report to the STAVKA late on July 13, the Front commander, Marshal S. K. Timoshenko, stated that he had designated a line behind the Dniepr and Sot Rivers in the Yartsevo and Smolensk regions as the concentration area for the 34th Corps and the 127th Rifle Division "to avoid feeding 19th Army's concentrating forces into combat in piecemeal fashion." In the event, the Corps would be strung out along the roads between Vitebsk and Smolensk.

Timoshenko reported on the situation east of Vitebsk on the afternoon of July 16, stating in part that 19th Army had regrouped to prepare to retake that place, and that the 129th was "marching to jumping-off positions for the offensive by 2200 hours, with the head of its column at the intersection of the Moscow and Leningrad highway." By now 19th Army was severely disrupted and would soon be disbanded.

=== Encirclement west of Smolensk ===
The XXXXVII Panzer Corps, consisting of 29th Motorized Division in the lead, followed by 18th Panzer Division (17th Panzer Division was keeping 20th Army tied down at Orsha), had begun advancing from Horki early on July 13. The left wing rifle divisions of that Army were shoved aside and by dusk the town of Krasnyi, 56km southwest of Smolensk, was in German hands. Meanwhile, 17th Panzer had cleared Orsha and was pushing 20th Army into an elongated pocket north of the Dniepr west of Smolensk by July 15. In addition, the pocket contained the 129th and 158th, three divisions of 25th Corps, remnants of 5th and 7th Mechanized Corps, and various other formations totaling 20 divisions of several types and states of repair. However, XXXXVII Panzer was extended over 112km and 18th Panzer, as an example, was attempting to take up blocking positions at Krasnyi with just 12 tanks still operating.

16th Army, led by Lt. Gen. M. F. Lukin, was tasked with the defense of the south approaches to the city, but had only two rifle divisions (46th and 152nd) and the 57th Tank Division under command. Despite serious resistance the 29th Motorized reached the southern outskirts of Smolensk on the evening of July 15; a three-day battle for the city center began the next morning with the 152nd and the 129th, which was now under 16th Army. General Gorodnianskii had reinforced his division with a collection of subunits formed from stragglers and now had some 10,000 personnel on strength. Reaching the city from the north at dawn on July 16 the division attempted to throw out the 29th Motorized but was forced to give up their gains in the northern half with heavy losses from continuous attacks and counterattacks. Lukin ordered the effort to continue, and Gorodnianskii regained much of his lost ground in a night attack on July 16/17, but this was lost to further counterattacks during the afternoon.

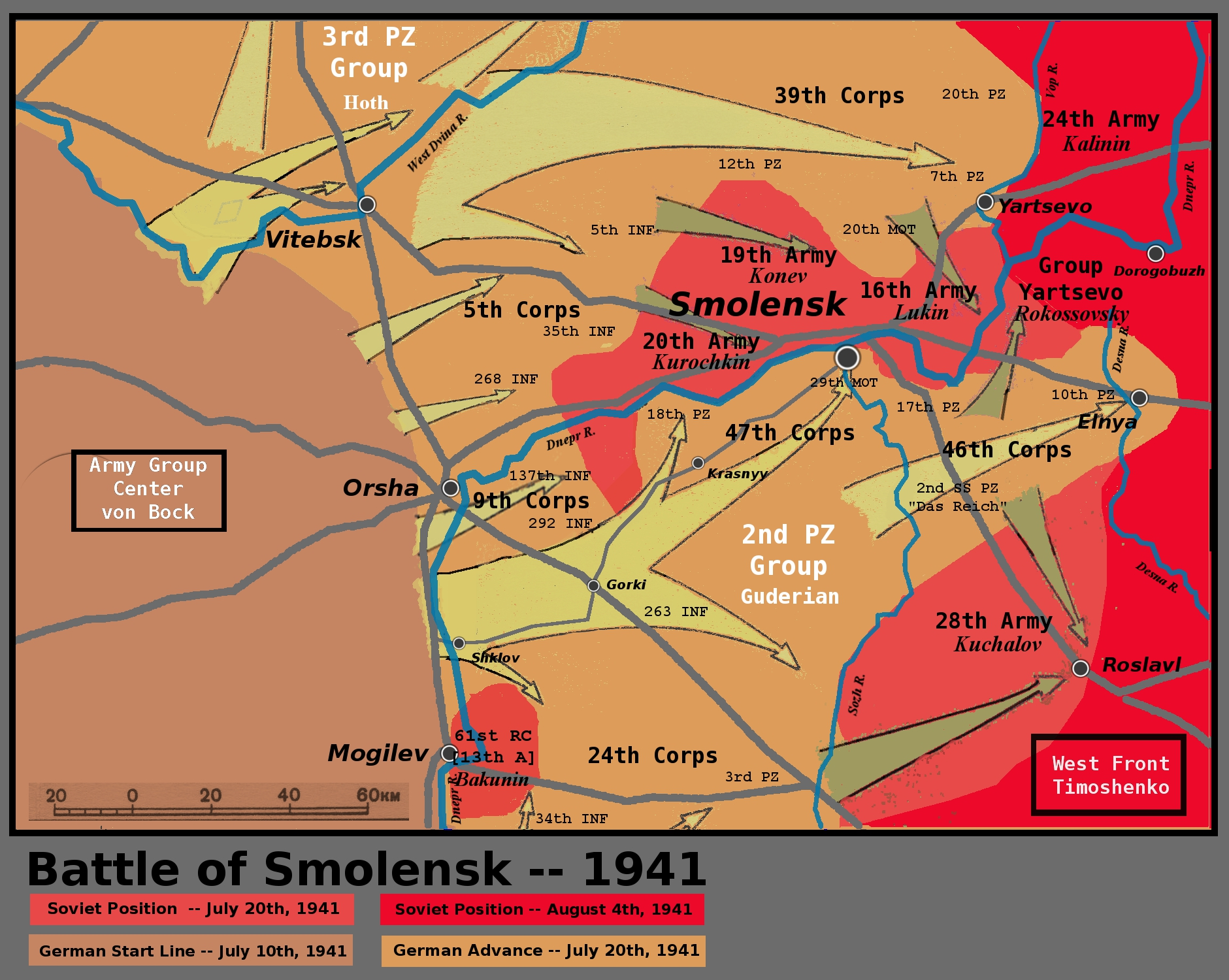
Battle of Smolensk. Note positions of 19th and 16th Armies.

At 2300 hours on July 17 Lukin reported that:

16th Army is continuing to hold on to the Zagor'e, Maloe Vozmishche, Buda, Kuprino, and Katyn Station line [30km northeast to 25km southwest of Smolensk] with separate detachments from 46th RD, and the withdrawing units of 129th RD are attacking to capture Demidov and Smolensk.

The 3rd Battalion of the 457th Rifle Regiment was said to be attacking alongside the 1st Battalion of the 46th's 314th Regiment into Korolevka, with support from the assets of 34th Corps. Lukin ordered the assault to resume the next day, reinforcing what was now being called Gorodnianskii's Detachment with the remnants of 158th and 127th Divisions from the disbanded 19th Army.

By day's end on July 18 Smolensk was mostly in German hands, and 16th Army was partially encircled, along with the remnants of the 19th and other formations retreating from the frontier. Despite this success, it was increasingly clear that 29th Motorized and 18th Panzer were incapable of linking up with XXXIX Motorized Corps' 7th Panzer Division advancing from the north to complete the encirclement. Soviet forces were continuing to resist strongly, and the German mobile forces did not have sufficient infantry to seal the gaps. As the V Army Corps and IX Army Corps closed on Smolensk from northwest and southwest respectively to relieve the motorized troops the 129th and 152nd continued to incorporate many company and battalion-size groups from defeated divisions and put them into action in a battle that continued for ten days. Timoshenko had received orders from the STAVKA to hold (or retake) the city "at all cost." On July 19 Lt. Gen. A. I. Yeryomenko took over Western Front, while Timoshenko remained in command of the Western Direction. By this time Lukin had begun moving his two divisions from the west and southwest part of the pocket to concentrate them for the recapture of Smolensk. The 129th still had a foothold in the northern part of the city.

At 2000 hours that day Lukin was finally able to report to Front headquarters on his Army's situation, which included:

Major General Gorodniansky's Detachment [129th RD] - Fighting a seesaw battle in Smolensk, with 1st Bn, 340th RR, and one battalion of 720th RR on the western edge of Smolensk and the airfield; 3rd Bn, 457th RR, in the northern suburbs of Smolensk, and 343rd RR (less one rifle battalion) at the Marker 251 line.

On July 20 Timoshenko's commissar, N. A. Bulganin, correctly informed Stalin as follows:

During the course of 17 and 18 July, separate regions of the city changed hands as a result of heavy fighting. The enemy occupied the greater part of the city by the morning of 19 July.Attacks by our forces on 19 July once again seized the northwestern part of the city.

By now the armies in the pocket were under control of the commander of 20th Army, Lt. Gen. P. A. Kurochkin. Under his orders Lukin handed his sector west and north of the city to Kurochkin's army and sent the 152nd and 46th to reinforce the 129th. Lukin reported at 2000 hours on July 20 that four battalions of the 129th were "attacking Smolensk from the north, seized the airfield with its left wing and reached the Chernichka River, but facing two battalions of enemy motorized infantry with tanks, supported by massed mortar and automatic weapons fire and 'impudently' operating aircraft." He went on to state that food and ammunition was in short supply and that he had suspended the use of stragglers because "it has a negative influence on the combat steadfastness of the subunits." In his report the following evening he said the same four battalions would again attack the north part of the city overnight; the 457th Regiment, now down to 470 men, was on the northern slope of Hill 251.9.

=== The fight for the city ===
16th Army attacked from the north toward Smolensk beginning at 0100 hours on July 21. This led to protracted street fighting through the day in the northern part of the city. 29th Motorized was forced to withdraw most of its forces from the part of the city north of the river. However, Lukin reported that the personnel losses among his forces had reached 40 percent. The fighting continued the next day, as 34th Corps joined the attack from the southeast; although this was unsuccessful the XXXXVII Motorized Corps was forced to send the 17th Panzer Division to assist 29th Motorized, which in turn helped prevent the closing of the pocket. On the evening of July 23, Western Front reported, in part, that the 129th had retaken the northern and northeastern part of the city, reaching the water tower and the cemetery. However, early the next day Lukin's headquarters was forced to report that the Army had failed to completely clear the northern part of Smolensk, and the 129th was "fighting on the approaches to the northern part of the city with its right wing reaching the airfield's hangar and its left wing, Tantsovka." Through this entire battle Army Group Center was making every effort to disengage its motorized and panzer forces in order to renew the advance toward Moscow, but the infantry was slow to move up.

The situation within the pocket became increasingly difficult, despite Group Rokossovskii holding open a gap in the Yartsevo area. In the morning of July 26 Western Front reported that 16th Army was attacking into the southeastern part of Smolensk, while also fortifying its positions in the northern part; the division was specifically noted as digging in on the north bank of the Dniepr while mopping up remaining German units. Kurochkin sent a detailed report to Timoshenko at noon on July 27 in which he stated that 16th Army was now facing the 137th Infantry Division within the city. By now the 129th and 152nd had been reduced to a combined total of 6,000 combat infantry. At 2100 hours Lukin reported that the German force in southern Smolensk now included "a probable SS motorized division" (Das Reich), two tank battalions, one or two artillery battalions, and the 137th. The two rifle divisions were displaying "organization, energy, and audacity in combat", in particularly the former, "which is composed of detachments formed from 'stragglers from the front' and separate subunits from other previously defeated divisions and which has now become 'one of the more steadfast divisions', in contradiction to his previous stance. By this time the two divisions, along with the 46th, had come under command of 32nd Rifle Corps.

Lukin was still determined to recapture the rest of Smolensk, but at 1400 hours on July 29 he sent an operational summary to Timoshenko which would have far reaching consequences. He reported that part of his Army was attacking toward Smolensk and, regarding the 129th specifically the 457th Regiment was along the Stabna River near Muzhilovo and the Isakovo Sovkhoz, 6-7km northeast of the city, while the attached 393rd Regiment was moving to the western edge of Muzhilovo woods. Further, he stated that since 0800 the 152nd had been attacked by a German regiment "with massive artillery and air support" and forced to fall back eastward to the right flank of the 129th at Tserkovishchi, 10km north-northeast of the city along the Stabna River after suffering heavy losses, while the 129th continued to hold "stubbornly". The report clearly indicated that 16th Army was no longer in Smolensk proper, and Timoshenko, under considerable stress, took this to indicated that both it and 20th Army were not only preparing to withdraw from the pocket but actively doing so, abandoning the city. In fact, the V Army Corps had two divisions pushing east over the lower Stabna, leaving Lukin's divisions no choice but to fall back or die in place.

Timoshenko responded to this apparent insubordination by sending both Lukin and Kurochkin a severe warning:

From your morning summary of 29 July, I ascertained, first, that you are carrying out a risky withdrawal despite orders to hold on to your positions, which is all the more intolerable in light of the operations being conducted by Groups Khomenko, Kalinin, and Rokossovsky, whose orders you are aware of.

He noted that none of their earlier reports had indicated any need to withdraw, and he therefore ordered them to:

Immediately halt the withdrawal of 16th and 20th Armies to positions west [east?] of Smolensk. Clear the enemy from Smolensk and keep it [the city] in your hands and do not abandon any position for any reason without my orders.

At 1430 on July 30 Lukin sent fresh orders to his units, in which he stated that 20th Army would attack the northern outskirts of Smolensk early the next day, and his own 46th, 152nd and 129th would attack "decisively" at 0400 with the same objective, while also defending the Kolodnia and Dniepr River line. The 129th would hold on the Kolodnia–Rogachevo–Nemytka Cooperative line and "take not a single step back - die, but do not withdraw." After being relieved by 73rd Rifle Division overnight on July 30/31 Gorodnianskii was to concentrate near Astragan State Farm and attack toward Smolensk in support of the 46th. Lukin's orders ended with various exhortations to take the city at all costs, that "retreat means death", all of which seemed to be directed more to Timoshenko, although he apparently did not receive a copy. Soon after midnight on July 31 a new report from Lukin did reach Timoshenko in which he laid out all the difficulties faced by his men, along with criticism of Kurochkin and a large amount of self-justification. Among other matters he claimed that all the heavy machine guns of the 129th and 46th had been destroyed in the fighting while the artillery had run out of ammunition. Timoshenko now had to assuage the anger of the STAVKA with a candid explanation of what had happened at Smolensk, while stating the movements were "without my sanction." After laying out the tremendous pressure faced by 20th Army he wrote:

20th Army, while withdrawing 73rd RD on its left wing on 28 July, uncovered the right flank and rear of 16th Army's 152nd RD, which was fighting in the northern part of Smolensk. Observing 73rd RD's withdrawal, 152nd RD, which, according to Lukin was under strong enemy pressure against its flanks and rear, began to withdraw eastward from Smolensk in accordance with its commander's orders. Then 129th RD, which was behind 152nd RD, also withdrew from the northeastern part of Smolensk.

He went on to state that when the Western Direction and Western Front headquarters became aware of the situation, Kurochkin was ordered to halt the withdrawal of the 129th and 152nd, but the following counterattacks on July 29 by the 152nd, 73rd and 46th failed and they fell back eastward with heavy losses. His counterattack orders for July 31 were impossible to carry out, as the divisions of the two armies each had only 1,000-2,000 men remaining, were under heavy attack, short of ammunition and fuel, and dependent on air supply by less than a dozen TB-3s per night.

==== Withdrawal from the pocket ====
This appreciation gave both Lukin and Kurochkin effective sanction to reorganize their remaining forces to break out to the east through the corridor that was being held by Group Rokossovskii. This movement put increasing pressure on the blocking positions held by XXXIX and XXXXVII Motorized Corps, which were also under attack from outside the pocket as well as Rokossovskii's troops in between. As early as July 29 a few mobile detachments of 16th Army had reached out to 38th Rifle Division along the Dniepr southwest of Yartsevo.

As of August 1 the pocket had been reduced to 20km from east to west and 28km from north to south. 20th Army was defending the northern half, and 16th Army's five divisions (127th, 129th, 152nd, and 34th Corps' 46th and 158th) were deployed in the southern half. The overall strength of the Soviet forces had declined from over 220,000 in mid-July to under 100,000, with inadequate supplies of fuel and ammunition. Lukin's report at 1900 hours stated that at least one German infantry division had attacked at 0600 with extensive artillery and air support. The report went on to state the 129th was suffering heavy casualties due to continuous attacks on its flanks. Lukin added that the situation was "tense", there was no ammunition for the artillery, and the divisions had lost all or most of their heavy machine guns. Meanwhile, Rokossovskii's group made attempt after attempt to widen the gap into the pocket by forcing back the 7th Panzer Division. Under the circumstances, Timoshenko's only rational course was to save what he could. Late in the day the STAVKA and Western Front tacitly authorized a breakout, although it was referred to as an "attack" toward Dukhovshchina.

At 0900 on August 2 Lukin directed Gorodnianskii to "defend the Peresvetovo and Puzovo sector on the eastern bank of the Bol'shoe Vopets River [28km east-northeast to 25km east of Smolensk], to prevent the enemy from penetrating toward Shchiurikovo and Liubkovo." He also instructed all commanders that they were "personally responsible to the Motherland and government for taking all of your weapons with you during the withdrawal..." This was to begin on the night of August 2/3 against strongpoints held by elements of 20th Motorized Division.

A gap some 10km wide extended between 20th Motorised and 17th Panzer, including several crossing sites over the Dniepr in the Ratchino area. 16th Army moved toward this, with the withdrawing forces running a virtual gauntlet through the gap, often under artillery and air strikes, fording the river in places where it was less than 60cm deep. The operation was largely finished by daybreak on August 5. What remained of 16th Army assembled in the area of Kucherovo, Balakirevo and Tiushino. Lukin reported on the same evening that his divisions were in tatters, moving in various directions after the crossings, and were still engaged in fighting with small German groups; he requested several days for reorganization. However, beginning at 2240 the escaped forces began to be incorporated into the main defensive line. Lukin was moved to command of 20th Army, with most of his 16th Army divisions under this new command, including the 129th. It and the 46th Division were relieved by the 73rd, and the division temporarily handed over its remaining artillery to the 161st Rifle Division before moving to the rear, concentrating in the Bobrovo area as Lukin's reserve by 0800 on August 7.

== Dukhovshchina Offensives ==
While there is little agreement on numbers, it seems that as many as 50,000 soldiers of the two Armies managed to escape from the sack. However, the individual divisions had been weakened to 1,000 - 2,000 personnel on average and were considerably weaker in riflemen. During August 8-15 20th Army fought a series of actions to close the gap between Western Front and Army Gen. G. K. Zhukov's Reserve Front. The main objective was a line from Pridneprovskaya Station and Dobromino Station, 38-45km northwest of Yelnya, while also pinning German forces on the west bank of the Dniepr. The 129th, advancing against Großdeutschland Regiment,:

attacked from the woods south of Chentsovo toward Klemiatino with one rifle regiment, which penetrated into Klemiatino and fought street battles by day's end on 15 August. The regiment advanced 2 kilometres, for an average tempo of 250-300 metres per day. The division's other two regiments captured the line from the crossing over the Ustrom River, 1.5 kilometres northeast of Novyi Iakovlevichi, to Mar'ino, and advance of 7 kilometres, for an average tempo of 1 kilometre per day.

While this was no great success, the remainder of the Army, unsurprisingly, fared poorly. In the aftermath the commander of the 457th Regiment was singled out as an example of "unwillingness to search for the enemy's flanks." The 46th Division was now disbanded with its survivors incorporated into the 129th. At the end of this period the strength of the division was recorded as 739 officers, 719 non-commissioned officers, and 3,614 other ranks plus another 250 newly arrived replacements, armed with 3,763 rifles, 13 heavy machine guns, 31 light machine guns, one antiaircraft machine gun, 16 45mm antitank guns, 18 76mm cannon, 22 122mm howitzers, three 81mm and four 107mm mortars.

General Lukin issued fresh orders at 1430 hours on August 16 which directed the 129th to capture a line from Klokovo to Glinka. 20th Army was largely facing the 8th Infantry Division. In the next day's report the 457th Regiment was said to have taken Klemiatino, 24km south-southeast of Solovevo, while the division's other regiments were attacking in the direction of Yakovlevichi. Later that day Timoshenko ordered Lukin to resume his attacks, largely as a diversion from the larger attacks to the north. Specifically, the 129th was to be committed "in the Dobromino and Klokova sector, after leaving one regiment at the boundary with 24th Army to protect the Novyi Iakovlevichi and Glinka axis." Once the 129th and 161st reached the Yelnya–Smolensk railroad the remaining three divisions of 20th Army were to be committed. In the event, the 457th had to beat back a counterattack at dawn before attacking toward Marker 228.0, while the attached 343rd and 348th Rifle Regiments advanced on Novyi Yakovlevichi against stiff resistance.

For August 19 the division was to attack from Klemiatino in the direction of Obzhorovka and Alekseevo at 1000 hours with the objective of Vasilevo. From Timoshenko's point of view the main task of 20th Army was to continue to hold its scant bridgeheads on the west bank of the Dniepr so, if the rebuilt 19th Army was able to retake Dukhovshchina, a junction could be made behind German lines. The Front's report at day's end stated that the division had been forced to withdraw on several sectors. It dug in while also regrouping for an attack toward Alekseevo and Vasilevo. The 457th "repelled an enemy attack, supported by mortar fire and accompanied by provocative shouts in the Russian language," while mortar and machine gun fire was exchanged on other sectors. Meanwhile, vehicles and equipment continued to be withdrawn across the east bank of the Dniepr at the bridgeheads.

Early on August 20 the division attacked toward Obzhorovka but was forced out of Klemiatino and into its outskirts at 0700 hours by a battalion-sized counterattack. The next day the 20th Army as a whole was reported as fighting along its previous lines, as the division was ordered to defend along the Ustrom River between Klemiatino and Novoe Brykino Farm to prevent any German penetration into the rear. For August 23 four divisions, (129th, 153rd, 161st, 229th) reinforced with heavy artillery, were to attack the 263rd Infantry Division and then exploit toward the railroad between Dobromino and Glinka Station. This made little progress, as the 129th got back within striking distance Klemiatino by 1300, and the four were ordered to continue at 1030 hours on August 24. The report from late that day stated that the positions of the 129th had not changed. The next day General Gorodnianskii left the division to take command of the 13th Army. In January 1942 he would be reassigned to the 6th Army, being promoted to the rank of lieutenant general on March 27, but he was encircled with his Army during the Second Battle of Kharkov in late May and, according to different sources, was killed in action or took his own life to avoid capture. There is a gap in Soviet records as to who took over the 129th until September 17, when Maj. Fyodor Dmitrievich Yablokov was put in command.

=== Third Dukhovshchina Offensive ===
Timoshenko was determined to continue the offensive even as 2nd Panzer Group was beginning its southward drive to encircle Southwestern Front east of Kyiv. In his orders to Lukin he stated, in part:

Begin a general offensive on 30 August toward Klokovo and Riabtsevo Station [20-25km southeast of Smolensk], with 153rd, 73rd, 161st, 129th, and 229th RDs and your main attack on your left wing, capture the Pridneproskaia Station and Riabtsevo Station regions by 6 September, and subsequently turn your attack toward the northwest and reach the Gnezdovo and Pogost' line [15km west to 35km south-southwest of Smolensk] by 8 September.

Meanwhile, in the fighting on August 25 the division had made little progress apart from pushing German units back to Gorodok. The next day the 457th Regiment pulled back to the east bank of the Ustrom to stronger positions, while the 438th Regiment took an unnamed hill east of Brykino.

August 27 saw the 129th digging in, doing reconnaissance, and exchanging fire. Over the following days 20th Army regrouped in preparation for the renewed offensive. During this period vehicles, including a T-26 tank, were still being evacuated across the Dniepr. The attack began at 1000 hours on September 1 but the 129th, supported by the 129th Light Engineer Battalion, remained on the defense, supporting the 73rd Division with artillery fire from two battalions, while keeping one-and-a-half rifle regiments in reserve against German counterattacks. The next day it held its positions with the 229th while the attacking divisions gained very little ground. This situation persisted through September 4, by which time it was clear the offensive was a failure. That day one battalion fought its way across the Ustrom and, after learning that the crossing at Shiparevy had been destroyed, remained fighting in woods east of there. In the afternoon on September 5 the division, now further backed with the 2nd Battalion of the 302nd Howitzer Artillery Regiment and two batteries of the 872nd Antitank Regiment, was charged with pinning down German forces in Yakovlevo to prevent them from moving toward Yelnya.

== Operation Typhoon ==
As the fighting shifted to other fronts later in September, and as Soviet mobilization hit its stride, the forces of Western Front were able to rebuild to the point that the average rifle division had 10,500 personnel on September 30, although this includes new divisions arriving from the east. At this time 20th Army, now under the leadership of Lt. Gen. F. A. Yershakov, had only four rifle divisions (229th, 73rd, 129th, and 144th) under command.

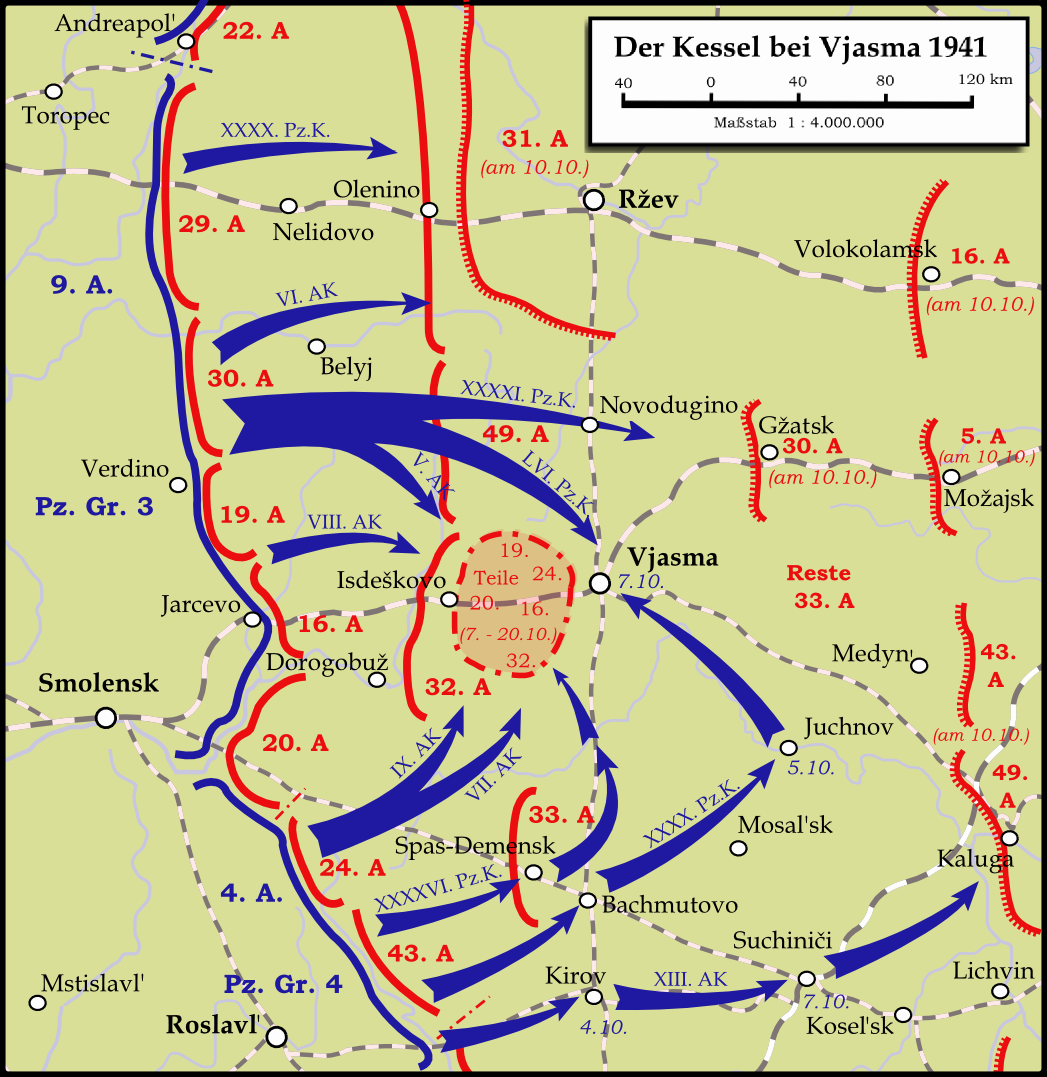
Operation Typhoon (northern sector). Note initial position of 20th Army.

The German offensive on Moscow began on this sector on October 2. The 144th and 73rd were still holding along the Dniepr while the 229th and 129th were echeloned to the southeast, facing elements of the XXVII and IX Army Corps. This placed the Army exactly midway between the thrusts of 3rd Panzer Group to the north and 4th Panzer Group to the south. By October 5 the Army's position was becoming increasingly precarious as the armored spearheads began to converge on Vyazma well to the rear. At 0750 hours the next day the new commander of Western Front, General Konev, sent out orders by radio for Western Front to commence a general retreat. By now the tips of the German pincers were separated by just 40-50km, while the 144th and 129th were 110-120km from Vyazma in a direct line.

With the transfer of 73rd and 229th Divisions to 16th Army, Yershakov now had the 144th and 129th, plus the 112th and 108th Rifle Divisions, under command. He was directed to withdraw the forces west of the Dniepr to the east bank and then both divisions along the Uzha River to Vederniki, and he set this in motion at 0500 hours on October 7, although it was utterly inadequate to the situation. The retreat was to be covered by separate regiments along three river lines, while he also kept a "strong reserve" on the left flank. Once the withdrawal was complete the 129th would become the Army's reserve. Yershakov attempted to regulate the movement as best as possible:

... 8. All division commanders when planning the withdrawal must first anticipate the withdrawal of the artillery.
9. During the withdrawal of the covering units, all road structures, telephone and telegraph lines and similar objects... are to be destroyed.
10. Division and unit commanders are to arrange through local organs of authority and by administrative means the driving of cattle from the areas abandoned by the troops. All agricultural reserves from local resources, which cannot be evacuated, are to be destroyed.

For an army in contact with the enemy and about to be deeply encircled such directions were simply unrealistic. The new line of defense was designated as another section of the Dniepr some 50-55km to the rear. Konev failed to coordinate with Reserve Front to protect the junction of its 24th Army and his 20th.

Already at 1920 hours on October 6, Konev was adjusting his orders for the withdrawal, directing Yershakov to pull back overnight to a line from Grigorevo to Krasnoe. German forces detected the withdrawal and immediately set out to pursue, but were held up by rearguards, plus minefields near Yartsevo. However, 19th Army, which was farther east to begin with, pulled back at a faster pace leaving the 20th in a difficult position as German troops reached the Moscow–Minsk highway, which it was using, forcing it to shift to the south. The back roads and the old Smolensk highway were jammed with rear-area transport of 24th Army. However, the German pursuit lessened as XXVII Corps was more interested in pressing east along the highway. Far to the rear, on the morning of October 7 the panzer groups linked up just west of Vyazma, encircling four Soviet armies. At this time the 129th, 112th, and 144th were on a line from Chernovo to Usadishchi to Krasnoe to Kholmovaya.

According to Western Front's operational summary issued at 2000 hours on October 8 no report had been received from 20th Army during the day. Radio communications were intermittent throughout the Front, and a liaison officer sent to Yershakov had not returned. At 1745 several additional officers had been sent by U-2 aircraft with orders to speed up the withdrawal to Vyazma to take up a line from Shimonovo to Ugriumovo Station, 55km east of the city. In case German forces prevented this he was to fall back to a line south of Gzhatsk. That this would require moving at a pace of some 70km per day was overlooked, as was the fact that the encirclement had been completed. As desperation set in several headquarters began broadcasting in the clear; these messages were intercepted by German intelligence and gave away plans to break out in certain places.

Sometime between 1700 and 1900 the headquarters of 24th Army received an order from Yershakov that it was being subordinated to 20th Army in order to organize a breakout. His plan was to maintain an all-round defense as 20th Army broke out across a line from Vyazma to Volosta to Piatnitsa [20km in width]. By now discipline was breaking down, making any organized effort across such a wide front impossible. In addition, all three places were now firmly in German hands. General Zhukov now ordered all trapped forces: "In the course of 10 and 11 October, breach the enemy's line and at whatever cost escape the encirclement..." 20th and 24th Armies were to penetrate to the southeast, despite Konev's earlier orders to do so to the southwest. A radio link with Yershakov had been briefly established, over which he reported he planned to break out south of Vyazma.

By October 10 Army Group Center was becoming anxious to destroy the encircled armies so as to continue the advance on Moscow as the weather was already deteriorating. Over the next week individuals, small and larger groups managed to reach friendly lines. The commander of the 229th, Maj. Gen. M. I. Kozlov, got out with a large group of officers and men from several units of 20th Army, while the commander of the 518th Rifle Regiment organized a successful breakout with most of his remaining troops. On October 25 Major Yablokov was replaced in command of the division by Col. Aleksandr Vasilevich Gladkov, who had previously led the 112th Motorized Rifle Division. On November 9 the remnants of the 457th Regiment were absorbed by the 222nd Rifle Division, and on November 13 the remainder of the 438th Regiment was transferred to the 144th Division. With the limited resources available the 518th was not a sufficient cadre to rebuild the 129th, and it was finally disbanded on November 23.

== 2nd Moscow Rifle Division ==
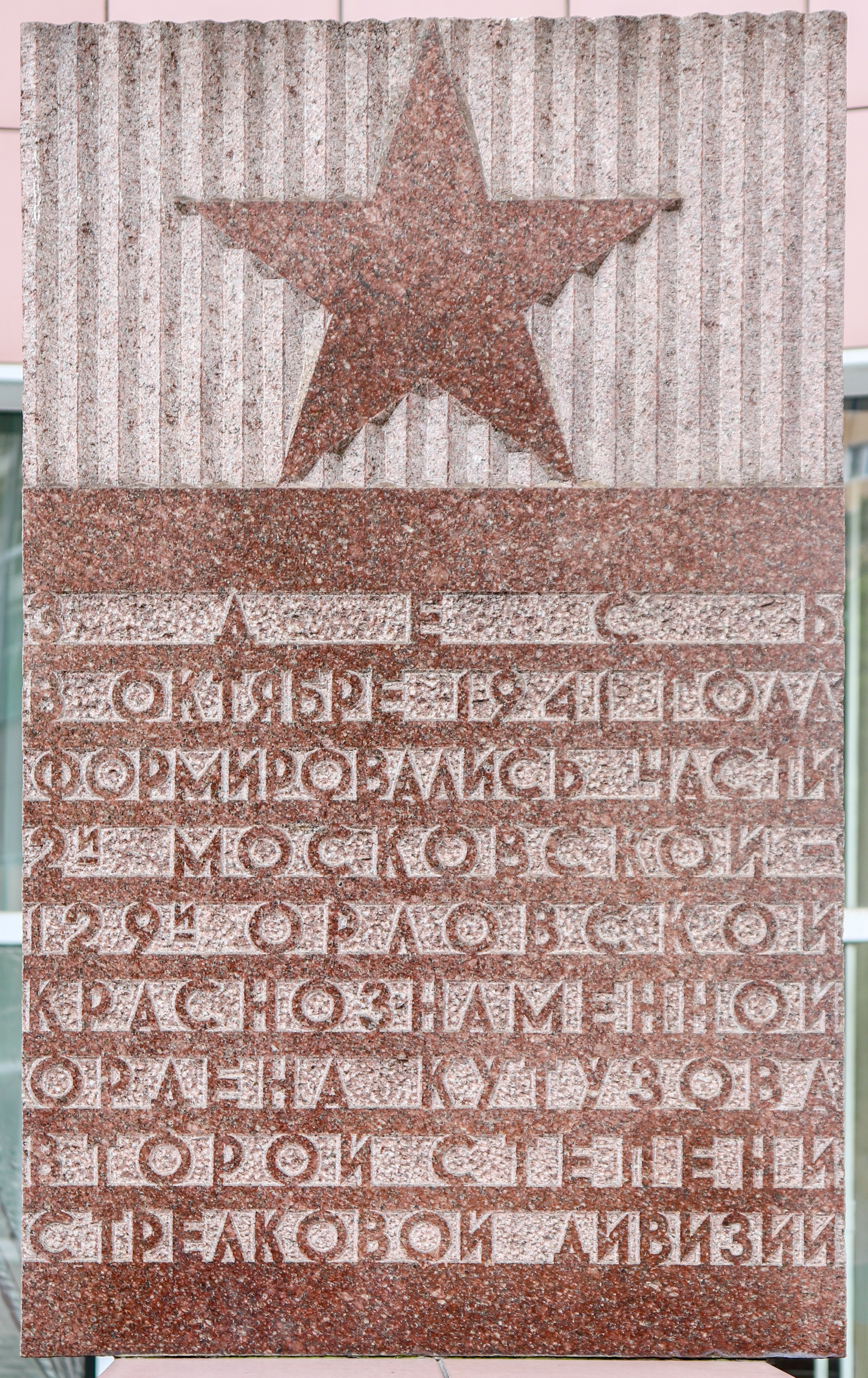
Memorial plaque in Moscow to the 2nd Moscow Rifle/129th Rifle Division

This division (incorrectly referred to as "Communist" in some sources) was formed in October from the city's worker's defense battalions that had begun forming in July. It was based on the large prewar shtat for rifle divisions, with an authorization for 15,361 men, and on October 24, when it was officially added to the Red Army order of battle, it had 14,719 assigned. The armies that had been defending west of Moscow had been largely destroyed during Operation Typhoon earlier in the month and the capital was under direct threat. Maj. Gen. Vasilii Andreevich Smirnov would be given command on November 4; this officer had been the commandant of the Podolsk Rifle and Machine Gun School since December 1940 and had led his cadets to the front near Maloyaroslavets where they fought against the German breakthrough in October. The division's order of battle was as follows:

- 1st Regiment
- 2nd Regiment
- 3rd Regiment
- 4th Regiment
- Light Artillery Regiment
- Howitzer Artillery Regiment
- Antitank Battalion
- Mortar Battalion
- Reconnaissance Company
- Sapper Battalion
- Signal Battalion
- Chemical Defense (Anti-gas) Company
- Divisional Veterinary Hospital

The division was declared as "ready for the front" on October 25 while in fact it was still forming up. It was recorded on this date as having only a fraction of its heavy weapons; even having the 472nd Howitzer Regiment attached from Moscow reserves brought it to just 107 guns of all calibres.

=== Battle of Moscow ===
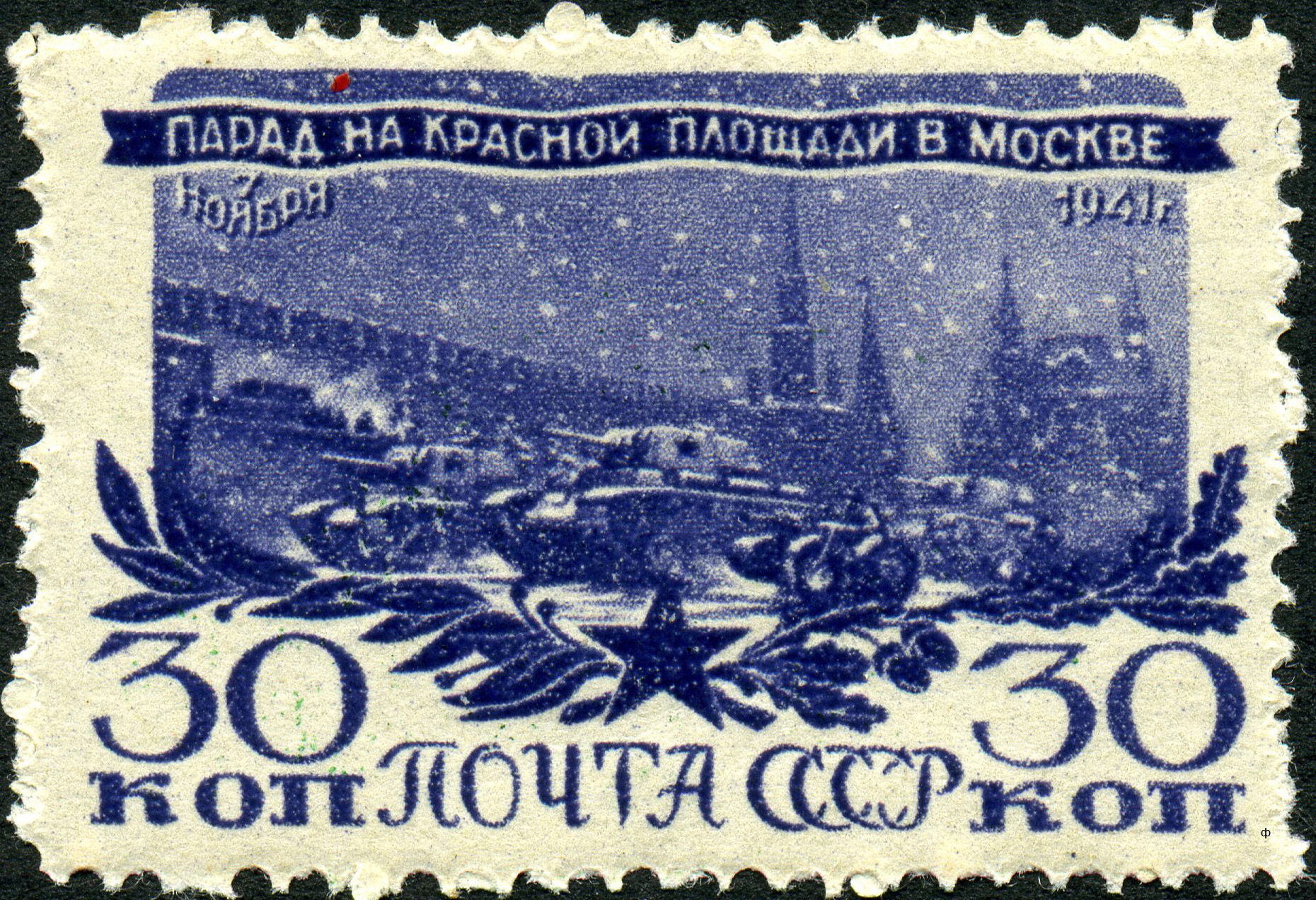
Stamp commemorating the 1941 parade

Three Communist rifle divisions, the 3rd, 4th, and 5th, were formed at the same time from the district "destruction" battalions that had been formed in June/July. Despite discouragement from the authorities, the four divisions included some 600 women volunteers. After the 2nd marched in the October Revolution Parade on November 7 the entire force was moved to the suburbs, establishing positions along the most vital routes into the city: the Kyiv and Minsk highways and the Kaluga, Volokolamsk, Leningrad, and Dmitrov roads. A great deal of effort was put into construction of defensive works, as well as front-line reconnaissance and combat. 2nd Moscow was given specific responsibility for positions northwest of Khimki along the line Klin–Ozeretskoye–Krasnaya Polyana–Gorki. One regiment fought for 24 hours near Krasnaya Polyana against a panzer division and suffered considerable losses before being reinforced.

On November 27 the STAVKA created an operational group under Col. A. I. Lizyukov, the deputy commander of 20th Army, consisting of the 28th and 43rd Rifle Brigades, a company of KV tanks, and two battalions of Guards mortars. It was ordered to "By means of stubborn defense along the line Khlebnikovo–Cherkizovo, prevent the enemy from breaking through to Moscow." To the right of this group the 2nd Moscow (less its 2nd Regiment) was covering the axis Rogachevo–Dmitrov, reinforced with the 311th Machine Gun Battalion and 15th Guards Mortar Battalion, along a defense line northeast of Khimki. This entire force was supplemented on November 29 by the 40th Rifle Brigade. Altogether this would protect the most dangerous north and northwestern sectors as the German offensive culminated.

== 2nd Formation ==
At the start of the Moscow counteroffensive the division was taking part in reconnaissance activity toward Solnechnogorsk. Otherwise it remained on the defensive until January 19, 1942, when it was redesignated as the new 129th Rifle Division. Within days it was in the 1st Shock Army in the Reserve of the Supreme High Command. On February 2 it rejoined the active army when 1st Shock was assigned to Northwestern Front. After redesignation its order of battle was very similar to that of the 1st formation:

- 438th Rifle Regiment
- 457th Rifle Regiment
- 518th Rifle Regiment
- 664th Artillery Regiment
- 287th Antitank Battalion
- 452nd Antiaircraft Battery (until March 13, 1943)
- 800th Mortar Battalion (until October 31, 1942)
- 192nd Reconnaissance Company
- 297th Sapper Battalion
- 276th Signal Battalion (later 276th, 347th Signal Companies)
- 196th Medical/Sanitation Battalion
- 52nd Chemical Defense (Anti-gas) Company
- 223rd Motor Transport Company
- 152nd Field Bakery
- 993rd Divisional Veterinary Hospital
- 673rd Field Postal Station (later 1801st)
- 1868th Field Office of the State Bank (later 321st, 1134th, and 1168th)

General Smirnov remained in command. The division was moved by rail through Valday toward the front east of Staraya Russa on the north flank of German 16th Army's II Army Corps. The coming offensive was intended to encircle the entire northern flank of this Army.

== Demyansk Pocket ==
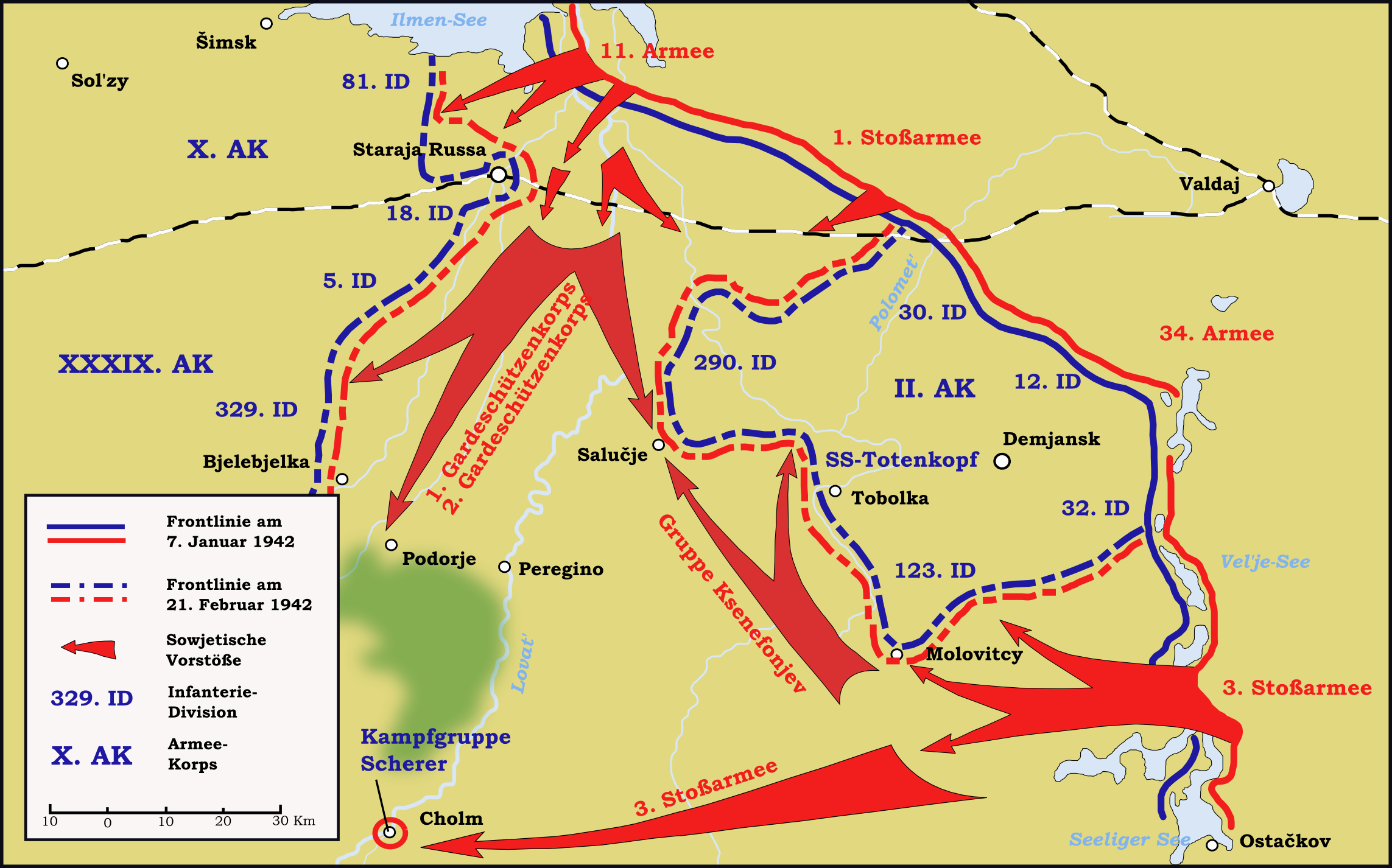
Encirclement of II Army Corps around Demyansk. Note advance of 1st Shock Army along the rail line to Staraya Russa.

1st Shock, under command of Lt. Gen. V. I. Kuznetsov, was committed on a drive to the south of Staraya Russa on February 8. Land communications with II Corps had already been cut on January 20 when 11th Army partly encircled that town, while 4th Shock Army stormed into Toropets. The initial objective of 1st Shock was the Polist River, forcing aside weak resistance from Luftwaffe-Division Meindl. 5th Jäger Division began arriving between February 15–19 to block any advance across the river. The 1st Guards Rifle Corps and Group Ksenofontov completed the encirclement on February 20 and two days later Hitler declared Demyansk a Festung, setting the stage for the fighting over the next 13 months.

The STAVKA now ordered Northwestern Front to liquidate the pocket within four or five days. The Front commander, Lt. Gen. P. A. Kurochkin, attempted to disrupt the airlift by dropping and infiltrating paratroops to take the three airfields within the pocket. This effort began on March 6 but had collapsed in failure by the end of the month. The Front no longer had the combat power available to overcome II Corps; supplies were very difficult to transport through the near-roadless terrain. 1st Shock was still reliant on the railhead at Valday, 100km to the rear. Operation Brückenschlag, the effort to reestablish land communications, began on March 21 and gradually pushed through 1st Shock's defenses, establishing the Ramushevo corridor exactly one month later, at considerable cost to both sides, but the pocket would continue to rely on the airlift for the bulk of its supplies. On May 3 the 518th Rifle Regiment was awarded the Order of the Red Banner for its role in the fighting to date.

=== The Ramushevo Corridor ===
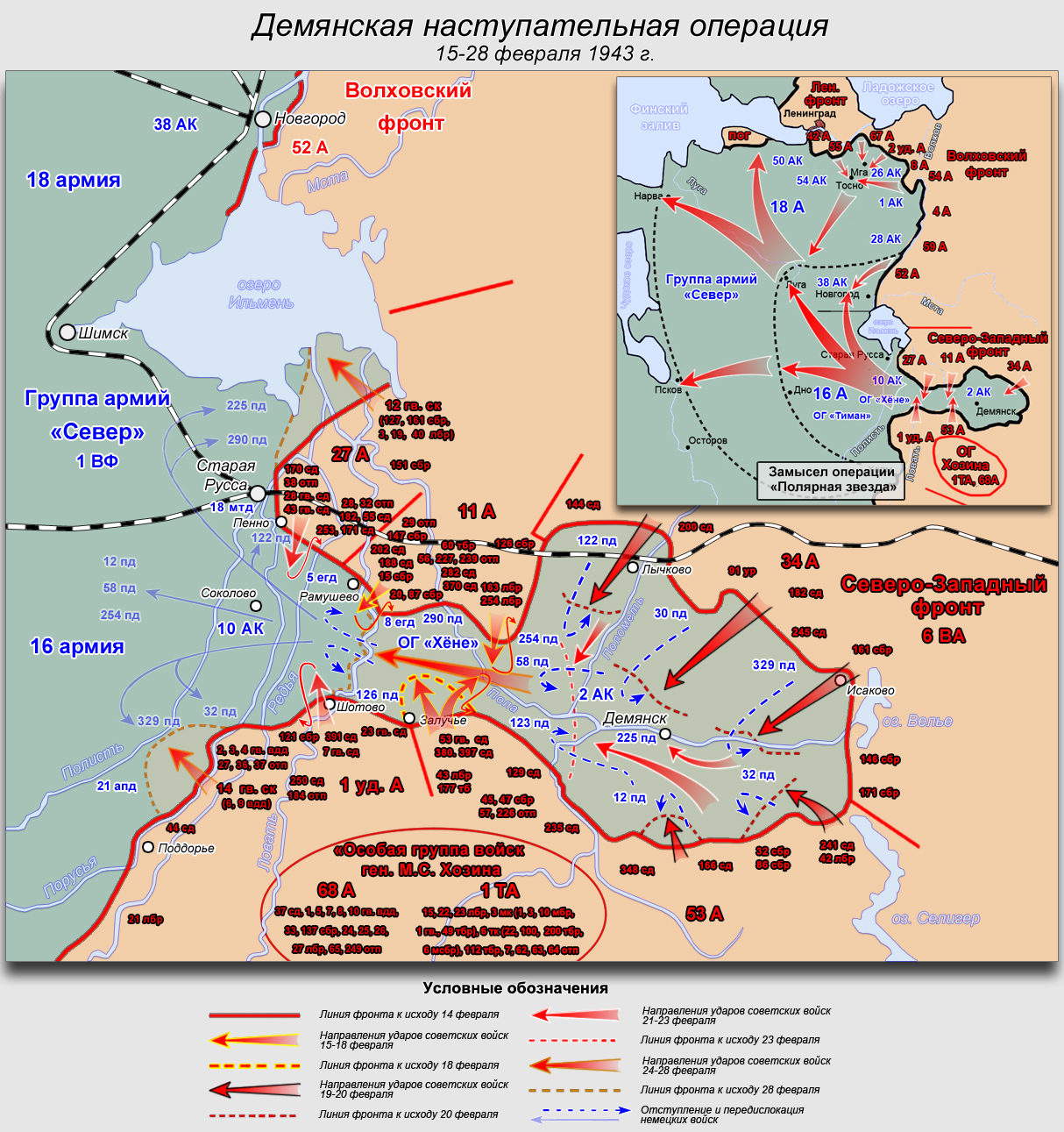
Soviet positions at Demyansk, spring 1943. The 129th was toward the left flank of 53rd Army.

1st Shock Army was located on the south side of the corridor and in July, August and September launched three unsuccessful attempts to link up with 11th Army to the north and cut land communications to the Demyansk grouping. The 129th played a largely supporting role in these attacks as 1st Shock relied on its 1st Guards Corps to carry out the actual assaults. A further attack on November 28 fared no better. According to Marshal Timoshenko's plan of October 18, 1st Shock was to "destroy the enemy in the forests between the Pakhinskii Mokh Swamp and the Starovskaia Rob'ia river by conducting its main attack along the Khakhileia axis on its right flank, with one rifle division (the 129th) and two rifle brigades (the 45th and 86th) and all army reinforcements..." This group was to cut the corridor in conjunction with forces of 11th Army attacking from the north. As had happened with Operation Mars to the south the operation was repeatedly delayed. On October 8 General Smirmov had been wounded and hospitalized, being replaced by Col. Ivan Vladimirovich Panchuk. Smirnov would be released in January 1943 and soon became deputy chief of staff of 53rd Army. He would later lead the 116th Rifle Division into the postwar. Panchuk had previously led the 170th Rifle Division and would be promoted to the rank of major general on September 1, 1943.

The plan had considerably changed by November 28. Now the shock group was to consist of the 129th and the 23rd Guards Rifle Division, supported by the 24 T-34s of 167th Tank Regiment, the 70th Guards Mortar Regiment, plus most of the Army's artillery, and the attack sector Rechki and Sarai sector, near the Demyansk end of the corridor. Covered by aircraft of the 674th Mixed Aviation Regiment the two divisions made a complex approach to their jumping-off positions overnight on November 27/28. The attack began at 1115 hours after a 45-minute artillery preparation and, due to careful preparation, managed to gain 2-2.5km through security outposts and extensive field fortifications and minefields before arriving at the main German positions at 2000, well after dark. Here they hit a wall of firepower, including some 4,500 artillery and mortar rounds. Only minor footholds were made in the German trenches before counterattacks in company and battalion strength drove the two divisions back to their start line. Under pressure from the STAVKA several attempts were made to renew the offensive over the coming days, with no success.

The next turn of the 129th came in the first days of January 1943. It formed a shock group with the 397th Rifle Division and the 177th Tank Brigade which succeeded in making a penetration of the German lines near Tsemena. However units of II Corps immediately counterattacked and surrounded the bulk of this force, including a small part of the former:

"Summarizing the second stage of the operation, the forces of the 129th and 397th Rifle Divisions and 177th Tank Brigade succeeded in wedging 2-3 kilometres into the enemy's defenses on a narrow sector. However, from 3 to 6 January, groups of enemy forces succeeded in cutting off some of these forces by conducting counterattacks at night against the flanks of the penetrating units. During the first half of January the army devoted its efforts to rescuing the 2nd Battalion of the 518th Rifle Regiment, together with an attached battalion from the 43rd Ski Brigade, [two regiments of the 397th], and the forces of the 177th Tank Brigade, which were encircled in the small woods 1.5 kilometres southwest of Tsemena. The encircled group, which was commanded by Lieutenant Colonel P. G. Saenko, the commander of the 448th Rifle Regiment, fought selflessly for 18 days, while experiencing critical shortages of ammunition and food... On the night of 20 January, Major P. I. Iakovenko, Saenko's assistant, who had taken command of the group after his commander perished, led 140 soldiers, 122 of which were either wounded or sick, out of the encirclement."

In the wake of Operation Iskra, which broke the German land blockade of Leningrad in the same month, Marshal Zhukov conceived a plan to encircle and destroy Army Group North: Operation Polyarnaya Zvezda. The first phase of the overall operation would be another attempt to cut off and eliminate the Demyansk salient. Zhukov finalized his plan during the week preceding the planned attack date of February 15. During a conference on February 10, he directed the commander of 1st Shock to transfer the forces of his right wing, including the 129th, and their tactical sectors to the adjacent 53rd Army. However, in light of the encirclement and upcoming surrender of 6th Army at Stalingrad, on January 31 Hitler had authorized the evacuation of II Corps. Operation Ziethen began on February 17 before the delayed Soviet attack could get underway, and effectively short-circuited Zhukov's entire plan. Soviet ski troops of 34th and 53rd Armies were used to harass the retreating German units but they were unable to inflict any serious harm. Demyansk was abandoned on February 21 and by five days later most of the corridor was evacuated as well.

==== Move to the south ====
In March the 129th was moved to the Reserve of the Supreme High Command for much needed rebuilding. On March 13 it was assigned to the 2nd Reserve Army, which was to be re-stationed in the Yelets, Lipetsk and Lebedyan regions. This was soon activated as the 63rd Army. On April 29 this Army was assigned to Bryansk Front.

== Operation Kutuzov ==
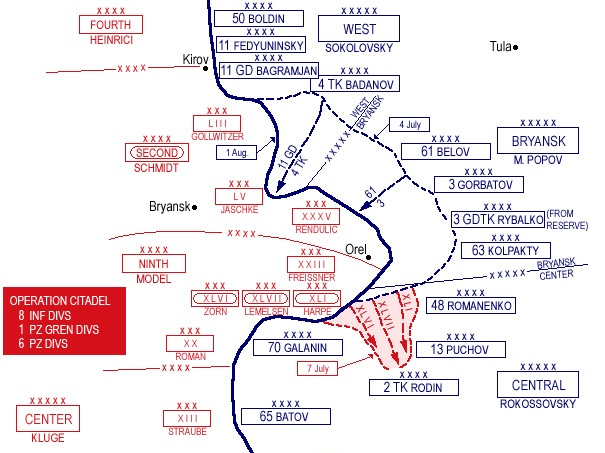
Map of Operation Kutuzov. Note position of 63rd Army.

63rd Army was under command of Lt. Gen. V. Ya. Kolpakchi and was deployed on the left (south) flank of Bryansk Front, adjacent to Central Front which was holding the northern half of the Kursk salient. Bryansk Front was facing the German-held salient around Oryol. The Soviet plan was to exhaust the expected German offensive toward Kursk before beginning its own summer offensive north and south of the salient. For his part in the northern attack Kolpakchi formed a shock group of six rifle divisions organized in a first and a second echelon plus four Guards heavy tank regiments (KV tanks), a tank regiment, the 1st Guards Tank Corps, four self-propelled artillery regiments, and several artillery units. The 129th, 348th, and 287th Rifle Divisions formed the first echelon. The planned breakthrough sector was 9km-wide on the Army's right flank from Vyazhi to Orlovka, and 1st Guards Tanks was to be committed only after the German defense was fully penetrated.

The 63rd and 3rd Armies of the Front were ordered to carry out reconnaissance along the planned breakthrough sector on July 11. The objective was to take the first trench line where possible in preparation for the main forces the next day. For this purpose the first echelon divisions prepared selected rifle battalions that moved to the forward Soviet positions under cover of darkness. This reconnaissance-in-force, with each battalion accompanied 3-5 tanks, followed a powerful artillery bombardment. It kicked off at 1150 hours, crossed the Zusha River, and attacked the first trench line. The battalion of the 129th successfully broke into the German position, unlike those of the 348th and 287th. Taking advantage of this success Colonel Panchuk committed additional forces to its assistance. Artillery and mortar fire covered the flanks while antitank guns, antitank rifles, and mortars were brought up to the captured positions. In addition to this limited success the reconnaissance-in-force showed the German forces were holding their first trenches, which was important for the artillery plan the next day.

The offensive began with that artillery preparation by 4,000 guns and mortars at 0200 hours on July 12, soon accompanied by air attacks. A salvo of Guards mortars signaled the main ground attack and the remainder of the first trench line was soon taken against weak resistance. Advancing to the west, the 129th captured a strongpoint at Bolshoi Malinovets by noon and began fighting for a grove farther west. With the loss of this and other key positions the German command took measures to delay the Soviet advance at any cost. Groups of 40-50 aircraft began to appear to bomb infantry and tanks, with special attention to the crossings over the Zusha. By day's end the main German defense zone had not been completely broken, but penetrations of up to 5-7km had been achieved.

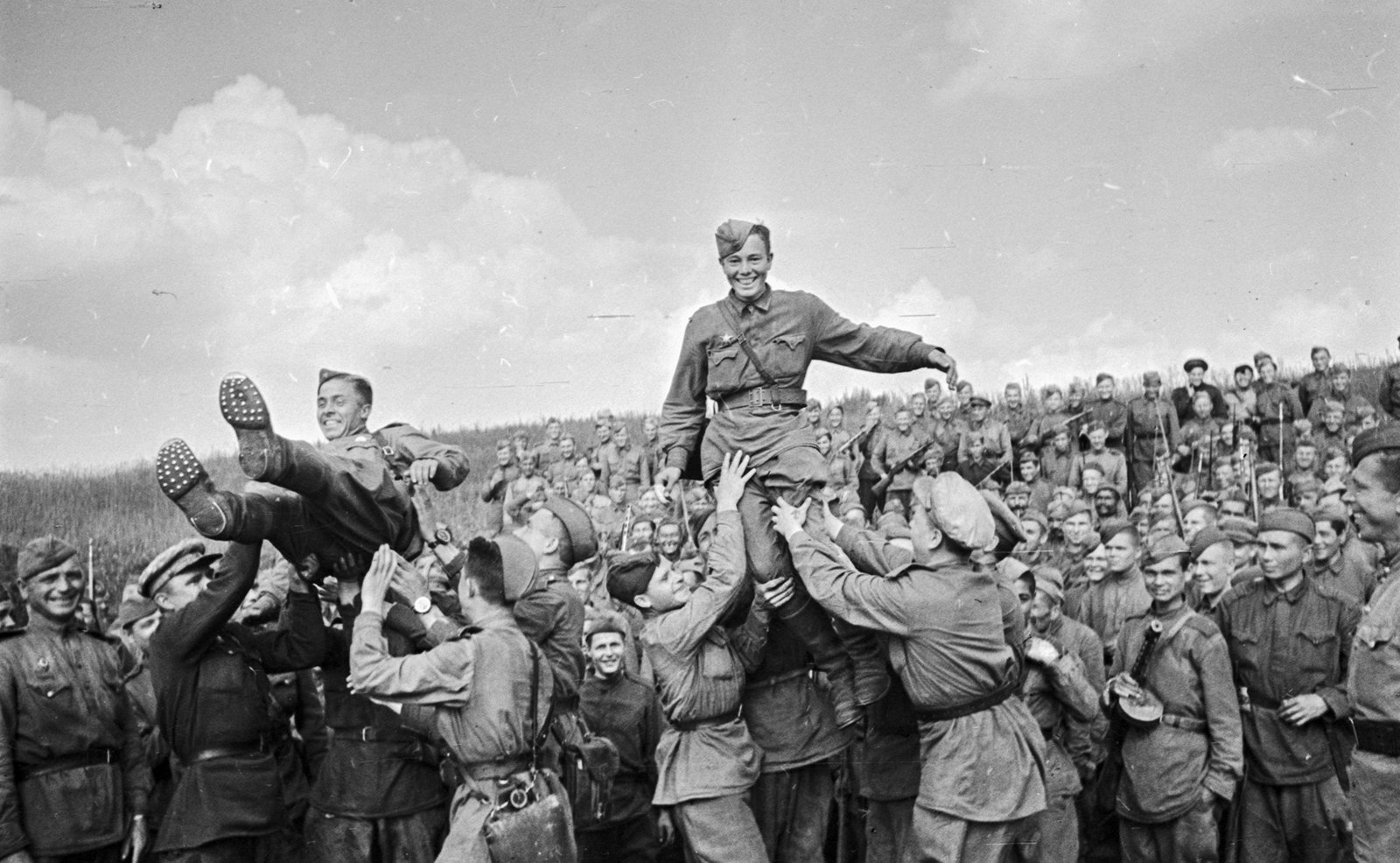
Lt. F. T. Kravchenko (left) and Sgt. G. S. Salikhov (right) are hoisted by their comrades after being named Heroes of the Soviet Union.

In the course of this fighting two soldiers of the 518th Rifle Regiment distinguished themselves sufficiently to be made Heroes of the Soviet Union. Lt. Fyodor Tikhonovich Kravchenko led a machine gun platoon into the German trench in the overnight attack, personally accounting for six German soldiers killed. He then took command of his company upon the death of its commander. The unit fought off several counterattacks before going on the seize the village of Vyazhi-Zarechye. Sgt. Gataulla Salikhovich Salikhov was in command of a squad when his company commander was put out of action, and led the unit into the fighting for the village of Setukha despite being wounded in the leg. He destroyed a German dugout with a grenade and accounted for a total of some 40 killed. On August 27 both would have their awards announced, and both men would survive the war, with Kravchenko dying in 1966 and Salikhov surviving until 2012.

The Front commander, Col. Gen. M. M. Popov, issued orders at 2115 hours to move 1st Guards Tanks across the Zusha overnight in preparation for commitment on the 3rd Army sector. The offensive was resumed at 0800 the next day, as the second echelon divisions entered the fighting. The 129th defeated the 484th Regiment of the 262nd Infantry Division and took the powerful strongpoint at Setukha. The conditions had now been attained for the commitment of 1st Guards Tanks, but this went slowly due to German air attacks. By day's end the rifle divisions, accompanied by infantry-support tanks, finished breaking through the entire German defense. On July 14 the forces of 63rd and 3rd Armies began arriving at the Oleshnya River as German reserves began appearing in the form of the 2nd and 8th Panzer Divisions. Their counterattacks rapidly slowed the advance of the 63rd's rifle divisions and on July 16 Kolpakchi ordered them to temporarily go over to the defense. At dawn on July 17, as the 129th and 348th Divisions prepared to attack the strongpoint at Arkhangelskoe, they came under heavy air attacks. Despite this they jumped off at 1130 against stiff resistance. The 10-minute artillery and air onslaught was not sufficient to suppress the German artillery and mortars, which prevented the infantry and tanks from moving. By dusk the entire effort was spent without meaningful gains.

=== Battle for Oryol ===
On July 19 the 3rd Guards Tank Army entered the offensive and helped restore its momentum. Overnight, reconnaissance by the 5th Rifle Division revealed the village of Prilep had been abandoned, and further reports of withdrawal arrived from the 129th and 348th. The three divisions began a pursuit, destroying rearguards and capturing the strongpoint at Mokhovoe. By July 23 the gradually retreating German forces were attempting to establish a new defense line along the west bank of the Oka River. 3rd and 63rd Armies were ordered to regroup as quickly as possible, preempt this effort, and capture Oryol by concentric attacks from north and south. This offensive was set to begin on July 25, with the 63rd providing the southern force. Kolpakchi chose to attack from his left flank with three divisions and a tank brigade, reaching Oryol along the Rybnitsa River. To begin with the 129th, 5th, and 348th would defend along a line from Deryuzhkino to Semyondyaevo to Novaya Derevnya. The 397th Division was in reserve.

The offensive was preceded by heavy air and artillery raids against German fortifications, artillery positions, and supply links. On the offensive's first day the Army encountered heavy resistance along the west bank of the Optukha River. Another artillery preparation was laid down on the morning of July 26, but during the day only the 287th Division made minor gains. Kolpakchi, lacking reserves, ordered his divisions to dig in temporarily in preparation for a renewal on July 28. When the attack was renewed several successes were gained but on the following day the defenders took advantage of previously prepared positions along the line Gremyachii–Kozinovka and again put up stubborn resistance. All attempts to break through to Oryol were unsuccessful. Kolpakchi again ordered his troops to dug in before a further regrouping.

Just before midnight on August 3 the 63rd Army went over to the attack along its entire front, catching the German forces on the back foot as they had been pulling back to the west; most of them fled into the city. Resistance along the outskirts increased after dawn, but, with powerful artillery support, at 0440 hours the 5th and 380th Divisions broke into Oryol from the north and east. Within minutes the 129th began its attack on the southern outskirts. Heavy street fighting broke out as the Red Army units employed combined arms tactics to clear building after building, continuing in the east part of the city until 1900 when the Oka was reached. Forward detachments crossed the river and the battle for the western city began. This proceeded more rapidly as two divisions of 3rd Army arrived, remnants of the beaten 12th Panzer and 20th Panzergrenadier Divisions falling back before them. By dawn on August 5 the city was cleared, and the division received one of the first battle honors to be awarded:

ORYOL... By order of the Supreme High Command and orders of the People's Commissariat of Defense of the USSR, the following were given the name Oryol... 129th Rifle Division (Colonel Panchuk, Ivan Vladimirovich)... By order of the Supreme High Command of 5 August 1943, the troops that participated in the liberation of Oryol and Belgorod were given a commendation, and a salute of 12 artillery salvos from 120 guns was given in Moscow.

Further advances by elements of both Armies encircled the city and many German units retreating to the west.

By the end of August 11 the 3rd and 63rd Armies reached a line from Dronovo–Kreml–Shakhovtsy. Dmitrovsk-Orlovsky was liberated the next day. The pursuit continued until August 17-18 when the Hagen line of defences was reached at the base of the salient. At this point the Soviet forces began preparing an operation to liberate Bryansk.

== Into Belarus ==
Bryansk was taken on September 17, and on October 10 the Front was disbanded, with 63rd Army going to Central Front (as of October 20, Belorussian Front) before the end of September. As of October 1 it was facing the XXIII Army Corps of 9th Army in the area of Gomel. Just before this the 129th had been subordinated to the re-formed 40th Rifle Corps, along with the 287th and 348th Divisions.

=== Gomel-Rechitsa Offensive ===
This offensive took place in several stages. In the first stage the 63rd was one of five armies tasked with seizing and expanding multiple bridgeheads over the Pronya, Sozh, and Dniepr Rivers north and south of Gomel. One of these had been created by 5th and 250th Divisions when they captured Vietka from the 253rd Infantry Division on the west bank of the Sozh, north of Gomel, between September 30-October 3. The initial efforts to expand this bridgehead were unsuccessful. Kolpakchi now reinforced it with 40th Corps' 287th and 348th, with the aim breaking out and attacking the forces of German XXXV Army Corps defending the Gomel bridgehead from the north. This effort fared no better. The offensive's second stage began on October 15, but the 63rd Army was only assigned to make strong diversionary attacks close to Gomel while the main effort was made in the south. This effort had limited success on the front of 61st Army but gained a significant bridgehead over the Dniepr on 65th Army's front. This stage ended on October 20 and the offensive as a whole was halted on November 1.

The next phase, launched by 3rd and 50th Armies on November 22, is sometimes referred to as the Novyi Bykhov-Propoisk Offensive. The initial role of 63rd Army was "to attract the enemy's attention away from the [Front's] main attack axis" and then "attack toward Zhlobin to envelop the enemy Gomel-Rechitsa grouping from the northwest." Following a successful penetration by 3rd Army the 63rd attacked across the Sozh River on November 26 in an effort to reach the Dniepr between Rahachow and Zhlobin. The attack was led by 40th Corps (now the 129th, 41st and 169th Rifle Divisions) and soon joined 3rd Army's pursuit of XXXV Corps. By the end of the month the two Armies closed up to a new defense line west and northeast of Potapovka and the front stabilized. This left a sizable German bridgehead on the east bank of the Dniepr. In December the division was moved to 35th Rifle Corps, but returned to 40th Corps in January.

=== Rahachow-Zhlobin Offensive ===
On February 18, 1944, 63rd Army was disbanded and 40th Corps was reassigned to 3rd Army, in what was now 1st Belorussian Front. Up to February 21 the Army was defending and preparing for an offensive with the aim of forcing the Dniepr; by this date its front extended 88km from Rudnia along the Dniepr to Zhlobin. The Rahachow-Zhlobin Offensive began that day, preceded by an extensive air preparation and a 10-minute artillery fire raid, but the former 63rd Army divisions were in second echelon. When the offensive was halted on February 26 the 3rd Army had advanced almost 30km, placing the Front's forces in ideal positions from which to mount an offensive toward Babruysk come summer.

== Operation Bagration ==
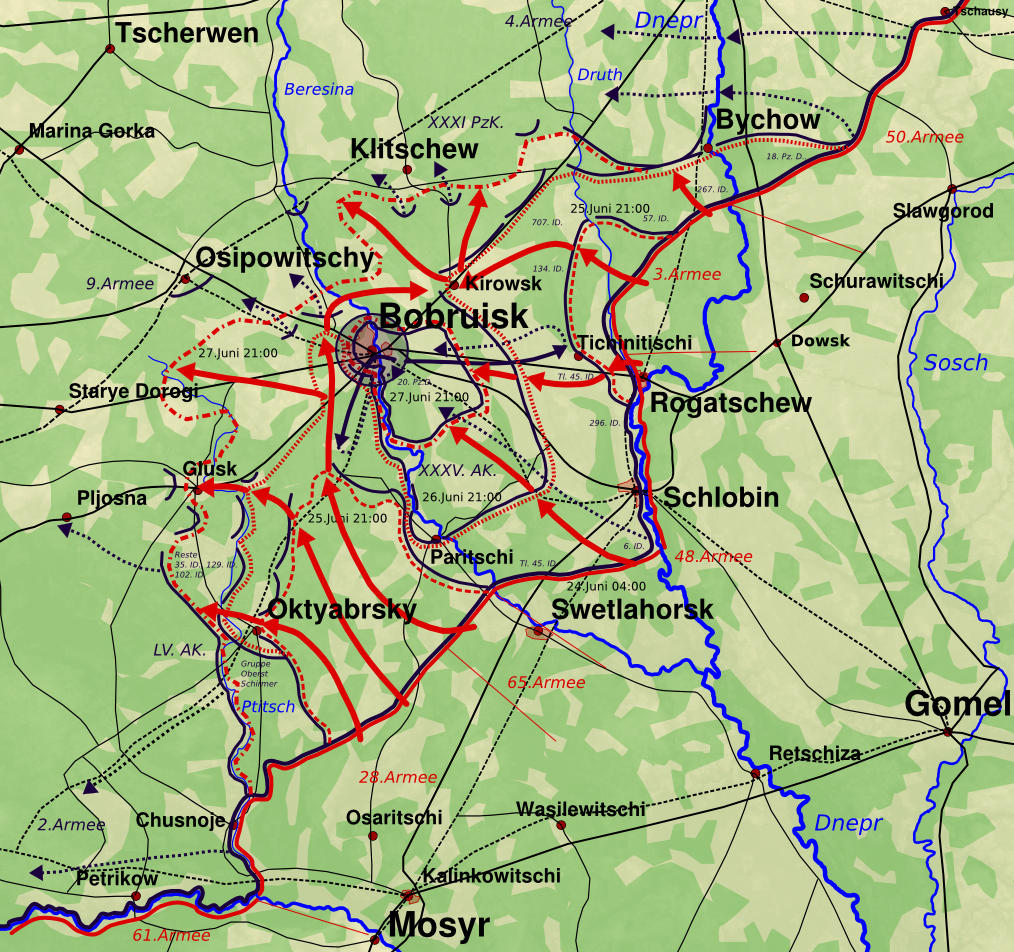
Babruysk operation. Note thrust of 3rd Army's right flank toward Bykhaw.

3rd Army was under command of A. V. Gorbatov, who would be promoted to the rank of colonel general on June 29. At the start of the summer offensive 40th Corps consisted of the 129th and 169th Divisions. Gorbatov's right flank extended from Yanovo to Khomichi, while he intended to launch his main attack on his left flank in cooperation with 48th Army to the south. The right flank was to be securely held by 40th Corps and the 283rd Rifle Division of 80th Rifle Corps. 40th Corps was specifically directed to prevent any breakthrough in the direction of Novy Bykhaw. According to the plan, by the end of the seventh day the Army was to reach a line from Chigirinka to Barki to Orlino to the east bank of the Berezina River.

=== Babruysk Offensive ===
The main offensive on this sector started on June 23. 40th Corps began with a shattering artillery barrage of 45 minutes beginning at 0200 hours against the sector held by German XII Corps near Rahachow, followed by regimental-sized attacks against the 267th Infantry and 18th Panzergrenadier Divisions. This was intended as a holding attack to divert attention from the main attack on the left. This made moderate progress on this first day and was renewed on June 24 at 0400 following another heavy bombardment lasting two hours, and the first line of trenches fell by 0800, but then stalled until the weather cleared and airstrikes could begin. The next day at 1000 Gorbatov's 35th and 41st Rifle Corps struck the 134th Infantry Division, and at noon the 9th Tank Corps joined the assault. The tanks soon crossed the road from Mogilev to Babruysk and advanced 10km toward the latter, with 40th, 41st, and 80th Corps following in its wake. Six German divisions were now in danger of encirclement southeast of Babruysk.

During June 27 the 48th, 3rd and 65th Armies advanced without much opposition to both encircle Babruysk and eliminate the three isolated German divisions that had been in the Zhlobin–Rahachow area. The 3rd and 48th forced a crossing of the Ola River off the march, which compromised the defensive zone based on it. Elements of 3rd Army also forced the Olsa River on a 10km-wide sector and got into the rear of the German Bykhaw grouping, which cut its retreat routes to the southwest and west; this advance also threatened the rail connection of the Mogilev grouping. Given the position at day's end, Rokossovskii tasked 48th Army with eliminating the pocket southeast of Babruysk while 3rd and 65th, assisted by the Dniepr River Flotilla, captured the city itself. In the morning, mobile units of 65th Army cut all the roads from Babruysk to the west and northwest, while its 105th Rifle Corps cut the paved road to Hlusk and 1st Guards Tanks broke into the northern and northwestern outskirts. Meanwhile, Gorbatov, striving to capture Asipovichy, released 40th Corps from Army reserve. By dusk the 129th had forced a crossing of the Berezina in the Shatkovo area and reached a line from that place to Sychkovo to Yeloviki, while fighting with German forces in the northern outskirts of Babruysk.

=== Minsk Offensive ===
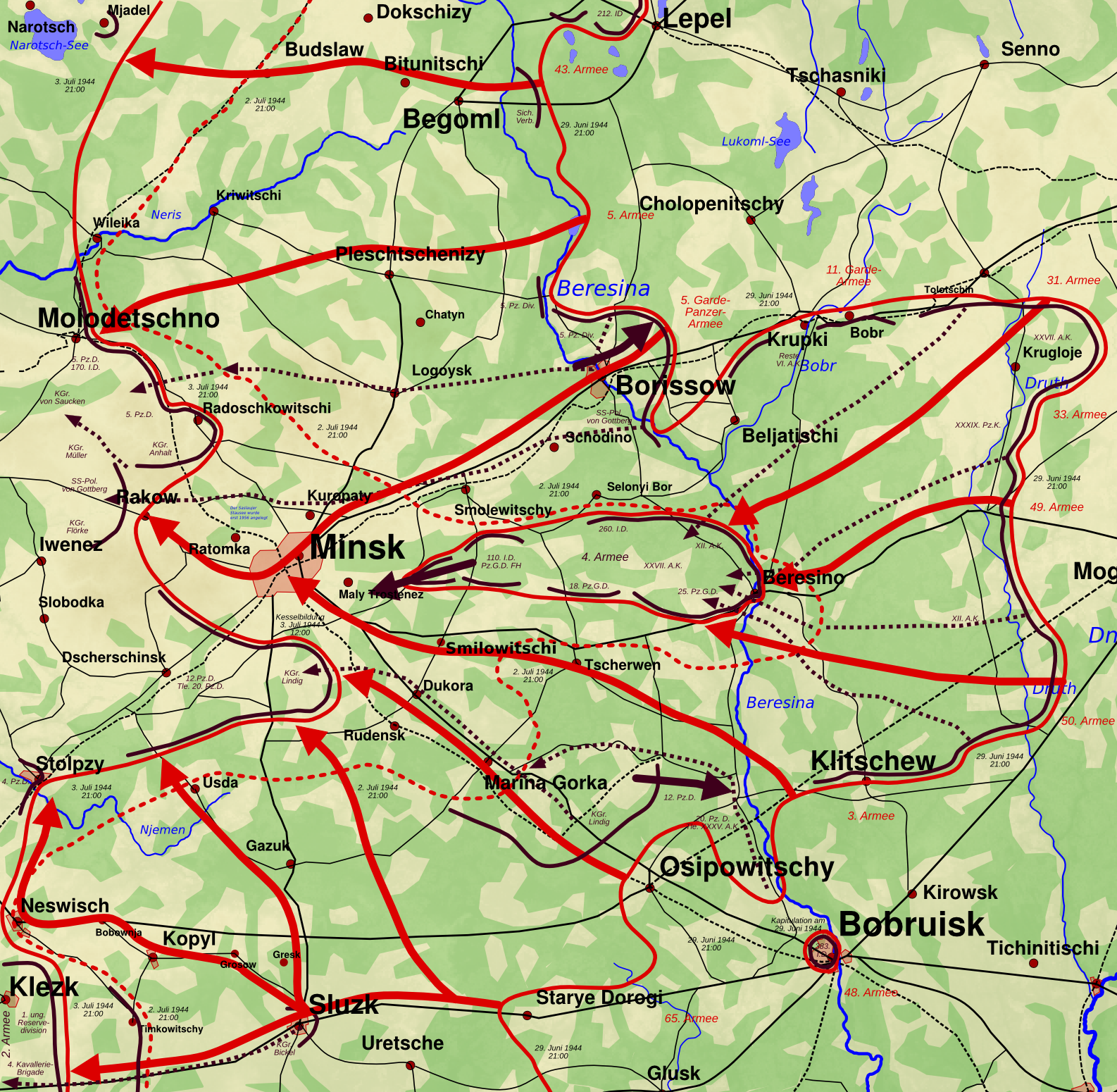
Minsk Offensive June 29 - July 3

On June 29 all three Armies cooperated to complete the liberation of Babruysk. In the evening the garrison of some 10,000 personnel, plus refugees from the divisions destroyed to the east, concentrated to attempt to break out to the west. Those who escaped mostly moved toward Asipovichy, but they were soon rounded up or re-encircled west of Shatkovo and Yeloviki. 40th, 41st, and 105th Corps were left to mop up the city. As this was happening, most of 3rd Army was expanding the offensive to the northwest. 40th Corps began moving on Chichevichy, now with the assistance of partisans of the Mogilev formation, and was largely pulled back into Army reserve on July 1.

=== Into Eastern Poland ===
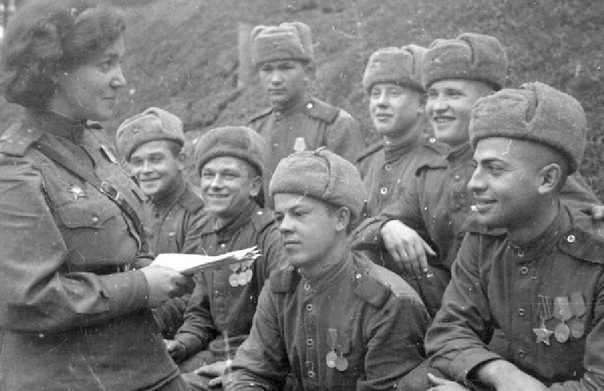
438th Rifle Regiment Komsomol organizer Galina Kievskaya talks with Komsomol member mortarmen, 1944

According to a STAVKA order of July 4 the 3rd Army was transferred to 2nd Belorussian Front. This Front, after eliminating the German pocket east of Minsk, was to continue the advance toward Novogrudok, Vawkavysk, and Białystok, crossing the Neman River in the process. The Army covered between 120km-140km between July 5-9 and reached the Neman after taking Novogrudok. At 0700 on July 12 the 40th Corps, in cooperation with 9th Tanks and 42nd Rifle Corps of 48th Army, captured Zelva. 2nd and 3rd Belorussian Fronts jointly stormed Grodno on July 16. Two days earlier 3rd Army had captured Vawkavysk. The Neman was the last major obstacle before East Prussia and the German command assembled more than 10 divisions in an effort to restore its line along it. During July 17-21, 2nd Belorussian Front was involved in heavy fighting with mixed results. With the commitment of 49th Army between the 3rd and 50th Armies and by July 24 the river had been forced in several places and the Front advanced 20km-30km to the outskirts of Białystok; this city was cleared on July 27 and both Fronts were soon close to the East Prussian border. On August 9 the 129th would be awarded the Order of the Red Banner for its role in the capture of the city. The 457th Rifle Regiment (Lt. Colonel Frolov, Ivan Vasilevich) was also awarded its name as a battle honor.

From late September until November the division was moved to 3rd Army reserves for rest and replenishment, but then returned to 40th Corps, where it would remain for the duration. General Panchuk left the division on November 22, eventually furthering his military education, and served in several administrative positions in Saxony-Anhalt during 1948-51. He served four years as military commissioner for Stalingrad before retiring in 1955. Col. Andrei Antonovich Ukrainskii took over the 129th.

== Vistula-Oder Offensive ==
By the outset of the winter offensive 40th Corps had the 5th, 129th, and 169th Divisions under command, and it would continue with this composition into the postwar, although the 129th would be detached during the Berlin campaign. The operation into Poland began on January 14. 3rd Army was deployed along the line Młynarze–the height southeast of Dombrowka. 35th and 41st Corps were responsible for launching the main attack in the direction of Krasnosielc while 40th Corps was detached to for a supporting attack toward Aleksandrowo. By the end of the first day, 3rd Army had crushed the defending German 292nd and 129th Infantry Divisions and had broken through to a depth of 5km on a 10km front. However, on the next day, the Army's units ran into armor of the Grossdeutchland Panzer Division, halting the advance and even losing some ground. The advance continued on January 17 against strong resistance, and by the end of the day Krasnosielc was being contested.

=== East Prussian Offensives ===
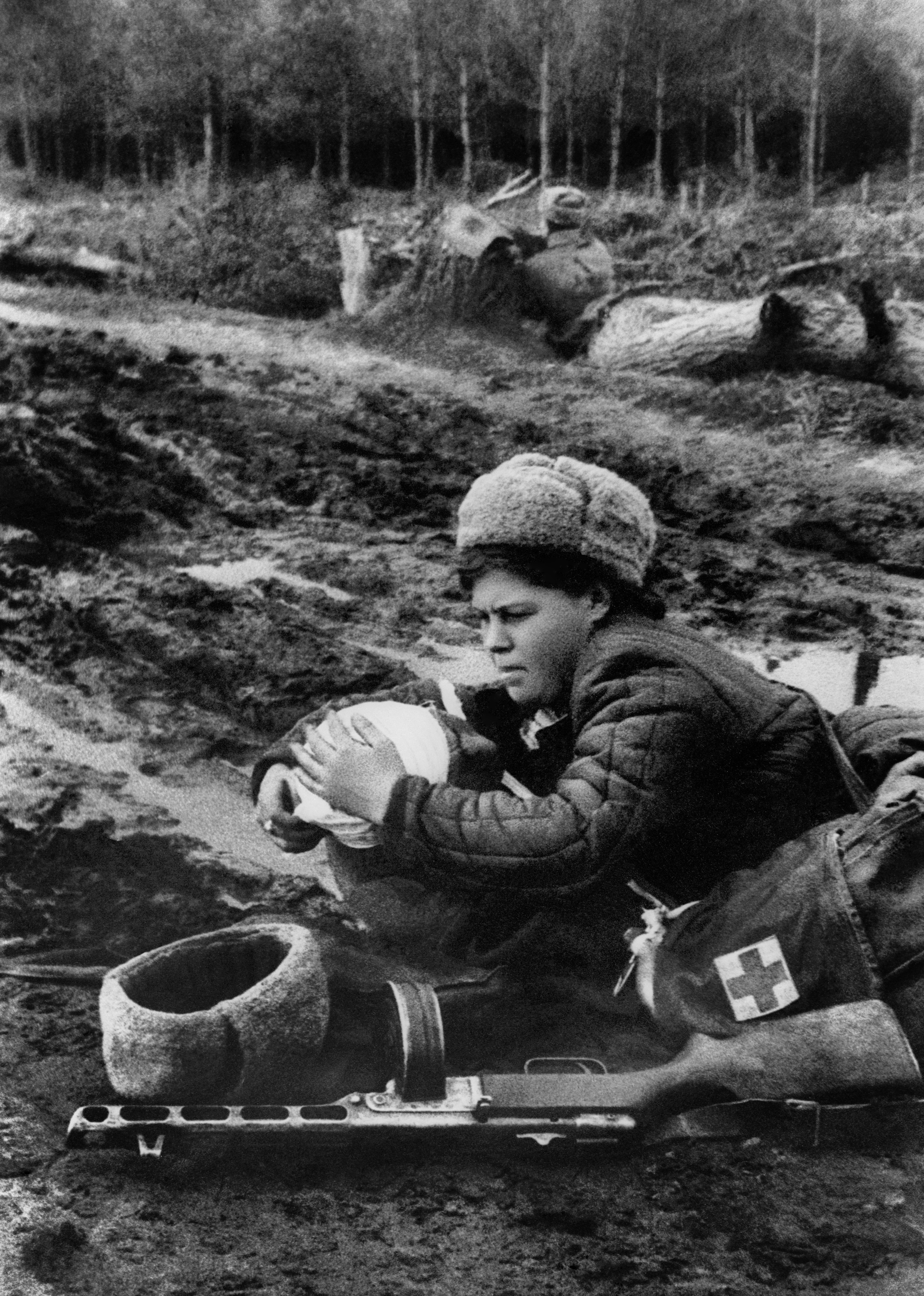
Medic Sen. Sgt. Olga Ivanova Borozdina of the 518th Rifle Regiment attends a casualty in East Prussia

On January 23 elements of the Army captured the important center of Willenberg, but spent the next three days fighting off repeated counterattacks. Following this, the advance continued on Guttstadt, while other elements of the Front reached the Baltic and cut off the German forces in East Prussia. In February, 3rd Army was reassigned to 3rd Belorussian Front. On February 19 the 129th was awarded the Order of Kutuzov, 2nd Degree, for helping to break the defenses north of Warsaw. Colonel Ukrainskii left the division on March 14, being replaced by Col. Yakov Artyomevich Romanenko, who would remain in command for the duration. On April 5 the 438th Rifle, 457th Rifle, and 664th Artillery Regiments would receive the Order of the Red Banner, while the 518th Rifle Regiment and 287th Antitank Battalion each won the Order of Alexander Nevsky, all for their roles in the fighting for Willenberg, Ortelsburg, Saalfeld, and other East Prussian towns.

== Berlin Offensive ==
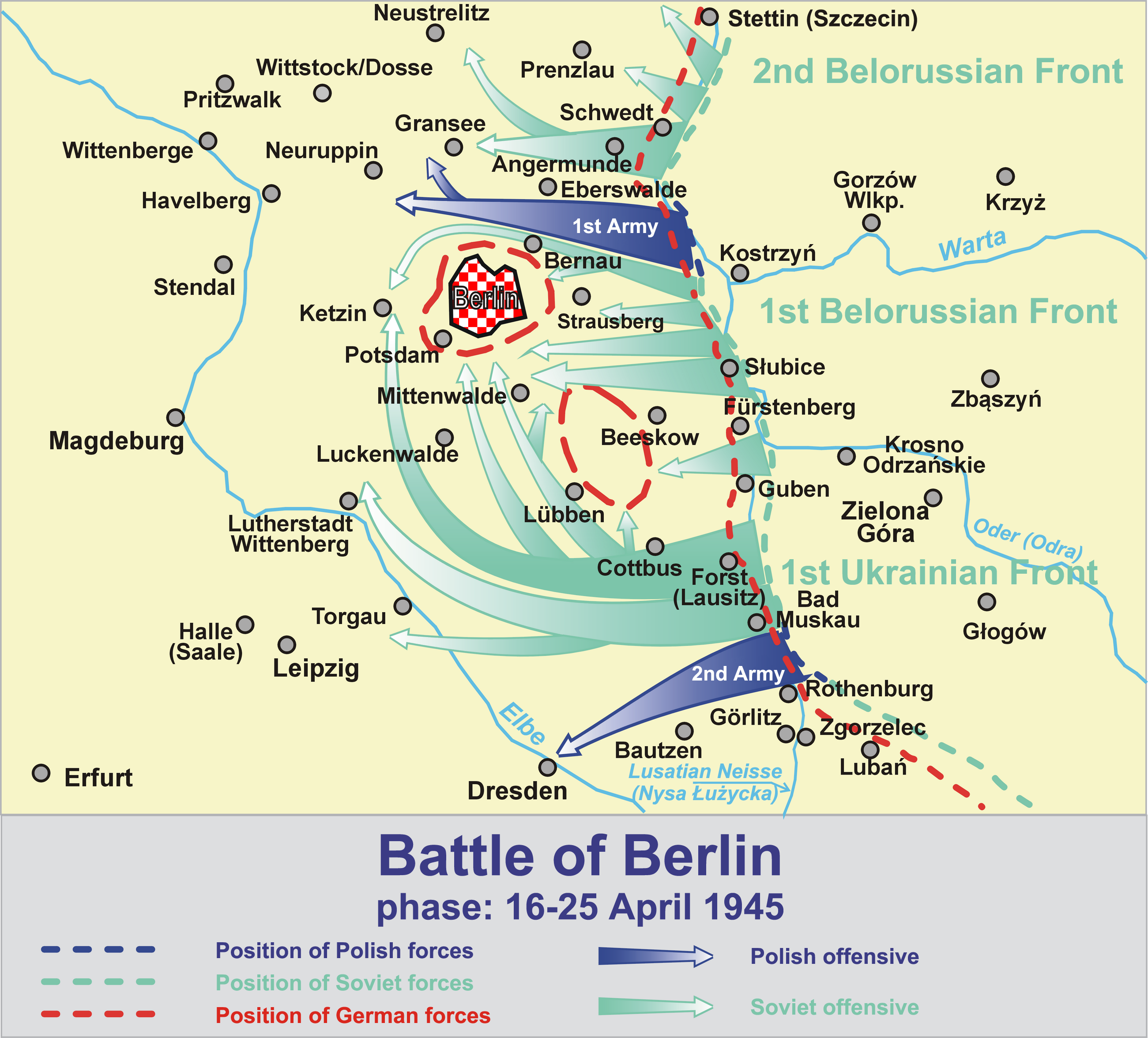
Battle of Berlin April 16-25. Note position of encircled 9th Army.

In April, 3rd Army was once again reassigned, this time to back to 1st Belorussian Front, in preparation for the assault on the German capital. The 129th was initially detached from 40th Corps, and directly under Army command. Arriving ahead of the rest of 3rd Army it was attached to the 38th Rifle Corps of 33rd Army. It deployed into the Army's bridgehead on the east bank of the Oder south of Frankfurt-on-Oder. The Army planned to make its main attack on a 3km-wide sector from Zsetznow to Lossow and a 3.5km sector from Brieskow to Wisenau. Nine of its 10 rifle divisions were grouped on these sectors, leaving the 129th, a pair of fortified regions, and the 2nd Guards Cavalry Corps to cover the rest of its 64km sector, mostly along the east bank of the Neisse River.

The balance of 3rd Army, just arriving from East Prussia, was in the Front's second echelon, concentrated in the area Trebow–Polenzig–Sternberg. The main offensive began on April 16, and by April 19 33rd Army was consolidating after having broken through the first and the second intermediate defense lines. Meanwhile, the 129th and the 283rd Rifle Division of 69th Army were liquidating the German bridgehead on the east bank of the Oder and mopping up the eastern part of Frankfurt. Following this the division advanced across the river after rejoining 3rd Army. By April 25 a large grouping of German forces under command of 9th Army had been encircled southeast of Berlin jointly by 1st Belorussian and 1st Ukrainian Fronts and the 3rd Army was committed to the operation to complete the destruction of this pocket. 40th Corps received orders to attack from the Schulzendorf area in the direction of Mittenwalde with the objective of reaching the line from Wasmansdorf to Mittenwalde to Potz, in order to establish contact with 1st Ukrainian Front. On April 26, for their roles in the capture of the city of Braunsberg the 438th Rifle and 664th Artillery Regiments each received the Order of Kutuzov, 3rd Degree, while the 297th Sapper Battalion was awarded the Order of the Red Star.

On April 28 the commander of 9th Army ordered a further breakout attempt from the Wendish-Buchholz–Halbe area to the west. This sector was occupied by 40th Corps and by 21st Rifle Corps of 3rd Guards Army and they were soon engaged in heavy fighting with up to a division of infantry supported by 18-20 tanks. During the day the Soviet forces beat off 12 German attacks and held their positions. As the size of the pocket contracted during the day it was clear that 9th Army was facing final defeat and a new attack began at 0100 hours on April 29 with up to 10,000 infantry and 35-40 tanks. By dawn this grouping had forced an opening between the two Corps to reach the Staatsforst Stachow woods and cut the highway 3km southeast of Tornow. However this breakout was halted by elements of 28th Army's 3rd Guards Rifle Corps. By the end of the month the pocket had been eliminated, with roughly two-thirds of its original strength either killed or captured. After occupying Halbe on April 30 the 129th began a largely unopposed advance to the Elbe River, reaching there on May 4 and taking up an outpost line on the east bank, where it later linked up with the US 102nd Infantry Division.

== Postwar ==
When the shooting stopped the men and women of the division shared the full title of 129th Rifle, Oryol, Order of the Red Banner, Order of Kutuzov Division. (Russian: 129-й стрелковая Орловская Краснознамённая ордена Кутузова дивизия.) Colonel Romanenko left on May 20, being replaced by Col. Aleksandr Grigorevich Baderko. On June 7 the division began moving back to Soviet territory. While this was underway a further decoration came on June 11, as the 438th Rifle Regiment was given the Order of Suvorov, 3rd Degree, for its role in the Halbe battle. On its arrival it became part of the Baranavichy Military District along with the rest of 40th Corps. It was at Polotsk in June 1946 when it was disbanded with the rest of the Corps.
