= Balchik Municipality =

Balchik Municipality Община Балчик
- Municipality
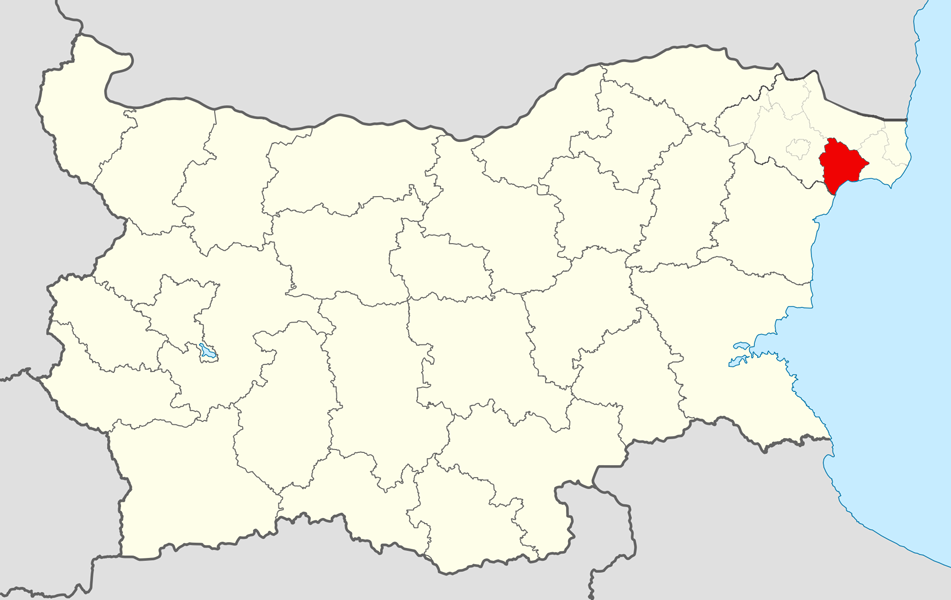
- Balchik Municipality within Bulgaria and Dobrich Province.
- Coordinates: 43°26′N 28°7′E
- Country: Bulgaria
- Province (Oblast): Dobrich
- Admin. centre (Obshtinski tsentar): Balchik

Area
  - Total: 524.153 km^{2} (202.377 sq mi)

Population (2018)
  - Total: 19,331
  - Density: 36.880/km^{2} (95.520/sq mi)
- Time zone: UTC+2 (EET)
  - Summer (DST): UTC+3 (EEST)

Balchik Municipality (Bulgarian: Община Балчик) is a municipality (obshtina) in Dobrich Province, Northeastern Bulgaria, located on the Northern Bulgarian Black Sea Coast in Southern Dobruja geographical region. It is named after its administrative centre - the town of Balchik.

The municipality embraces a territory of 523 km^{2} (202 sq mi) with a population of 19,331 inhabitants, as of 2018.

The area is best known with the Balchik Palace complex in the main town as well as the luxury seaside resort of Albena. The main road E87 crosses the municipality connecting the port of Varna with the Romanian port of Konstanza.

== Settlements ==
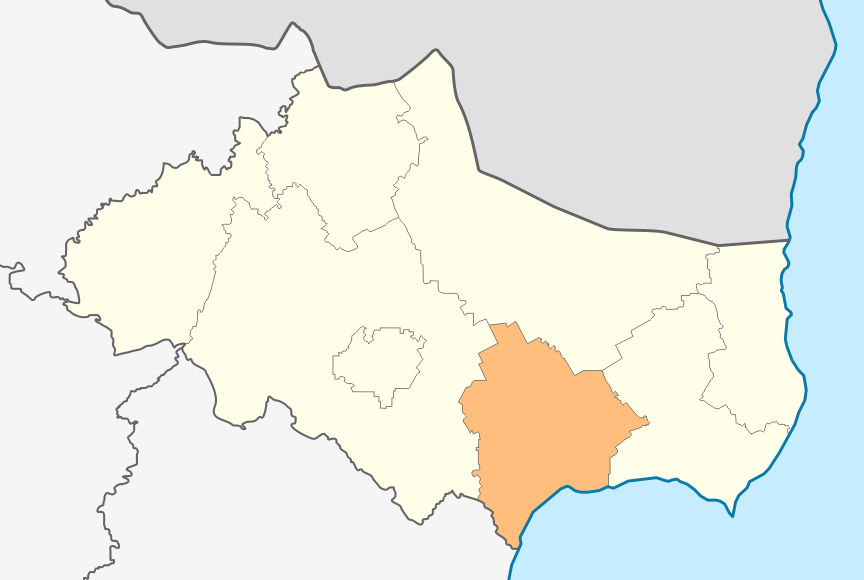
Balchik Municipality within Dobrich Province

Balchik Municipality includes the following 22 places (towns are shown in bold):

Town/Village	Cyrillic	Population (December 2009)
**Balchik**	**Балчик**	12,196
Bezvoditsa	Безводица	383
Bobovets	Бобовец	86
Bryastovo	Брястово	4
Dropla	Дропла	304
Dabrava	Дъбрава	216
Gurkovo	Гурково	560
Hrabrovo	Храброво	99
Karvuna	Карвуна	62
Kranevo	Кранево	1,233
Kremena	Кремена	128
Lyahovo	Ляхово	444
Obrochishte	Оброчище	2,411
Prespa	Преспа	248
Rogachevo	Рогачево	263
Senokos	Сенокос	661
Sokolovo	Соколово	1,004
Strazhitsa	Стражица	468
Trigortsi	Тригорци	192
Tsarichino	Царичино	159
Tsarkva	Църква	364
Zmeevo	Змеево	347
Total		21,832

== Demography ==
The following table shows the change of the population during the last four decades.

Balchik Municipality
Year	1975	1985	1992	2001	2005	2007	2009	2011
Population	24,254	23,978	22,367	22,354	22,038	21,962	21,832	...
Sources: Census 2001, Census 2011, „pop-stat.mashke.org“,

=== Religion ===
According to the latest Bulgarian census of 2011, the religious composition, among those who answered the optional question on religious identification, was the following:

Religious composition of Balchik Municipality
Orthodox Christianity	65.3%
Catholicism	0.5%
Protestantism	0.5%
Islam	20.0%
No religion	4.1%
Prefer not to answer, others and indefinable	9.6%

== See also ==
- Provinces of Bulgaria
- Municipalities of Bulgaria
- List of cities and towns in Bulgaria
