= Zmeevo =

- Village
- Location in Bulgaria
- Coordinates: 43.606°N 28.048°E
- Country: Bulgaria
- Province: Dobrich Province
- Municipality: Balchik
- Time zone: UTC+2 (EET)
  - Summer (DST): UTC+3 (EEST)

Zmeevo is a village in Balchik Municipality, Dobrich Province, northeastern Bulgaria.
