= Rogachevo, Russia =

Rogachevo (Russian: Рогачево) is the name of several, rural localities in Russia:

- Rogachevo, Arkhangelsk Oblast, a settlement in Novaya Zemlya District of Arkhangelsk Oblast
- Rogachevo, Ivanovo Oblast, a village in Privolzhsky District of Ivanovo Oblast
- Rogachevo, Kaliningrad Oblast, a settlement in Kovrovsky Rural Okrug of Zelenogradsky District of Kaliningrad Oblast
- Rogachevo, Kaluga Oblast, a village in Borovsky District of Kaluga Oblast
- Rogachevo, Kostroma Oblast, a village in Orekhovskoye Settlement of Galichsky District of Kostroma Oblast
- Rogachevo, Dmitrovsky District, Moscow Oblast, a selo in Bolsherogachevskoye Rural Settlement of Dmitrovsky District of Moscow Oblast
- Rogachevo, Borisovskoye Rural Settlement, Mozhaysky District, Moscow Oblast, a village in Borisovskoye Rural Settlement of Mozhaysky District of Moscow Oblast
- Rogachevo, Poretskoye Rural Settlement, Mozhaysky District, Moscow Oblast, a village in Poretskoye Rural Settlement of Mozhaysky District of Moscow Oblast
- Rogachevo, Ramensky District, Moscow Oblast, a village in Ganusovskoye Rural Settlement of Ramensky District of Moscow Oblast
- Rogachevo, Sergiyevo-Posadsky District, Moscow Oblast, a village under the administrative jurisdiction of the Town of Krasnozavodsk in Sergiyevo-Posadsky District, Moscow Oblast
- Rogachevo, Gdovsky District, Pskov Oblast, a village in Gdovsky District, Pskov Oblast
- Rogachevo, Nevelsky District, Pskov Oblast, a village in Nevelsky District, Pskov Oblast
- Rogachevo, Novosokolnichesky District, Pskov Oblast, a village in Novosokolnichesky District, Pskov Oblast
- Rogachevo, Porkhovsky District, Pskov Oblast, a village in Porkhovsky District, Pskov Oblast
- Rogachevo, Korokhotkinskoye Rural Settlement, Smolensky District, Smolensk Oblast, a village in Korokhotkinskoye Rural Settlement of Smolensky District of Smolensk Oblast
- Rogachevo, Kozinskoye Rural Settlement, Smolensky District, Smolensk Oblast, a village in Kozinskoye Rural Settlement of Smolensky District of Smolensk Oblast
- Rogachevo, Rzhevsky District, Tver Oblast, a village in Rzhevsky District, Tver Oblast
- Rogachevo, Vyshnevolotsky District, Tver Oblast, a village in Vyshnevolotsky District, Tver Oblast
- Rogachevo, Vologda Oblast, a village in Markovsky Selsoviet of Vologodsky District of Vologda Oblast
