= Dropla, Dobrich Province =

Dropla
- Village
- Location within Bulgaria
- Coordinates: 43.5833°N 28.0833°E
- Country: Bulgaria
- Province: Dobrich Province
- Municipality: Balchik
- Time zone: UTC+2 (EET)
  - Summer (DST): UTC+3 (EEST)

Dropla is a village in Balchik Municipality, Dobrich Province, northeastern Bulgaria.
