= Dabrava, Dobrich Province =

Dabrava
- Village
- Location within Bulgaria
- Coordinates: 43.5500°N 28.1000°E
- Country: Bulgaria
- Province: Dobrich Province
- Municipality: Balchik
- Time zone: UTC+2 (EET)
  - Summer (DST): UTC+3 (EEST)

Dabrava is a village in Balchik Municipality, Dobrich Province, northeastern Bulgaria.

Dabrava Glacier on Graham Land, Antarctica is named after the village.
