= Yakov Fokanov =

Soviet lieutenant general (1899–1985)

Yakov Stepanovich Fokanov
- Born: 7 December 1899; Kononovo village, Ustyuzhensky Uyezd, Novgorod Governorate, Russian Empire
- Died: 9 November 1985 (aged 85) Novosibirsk, Soviet Union
- Allegiance: Russian SFSR; Soviet Union
- Branch: Red Army (later Soviet Army)
- Service years: 1919–1959
- Rank: Lieutenant general
- Commands: 61st Rifle Division; 129th Rifle Division; 154th Rifle Division (became 47th Guards Rifle Division); 29th Guards Rifle Corps; 29th Rifle Corps
- Conflicts: Russian Civil War; Kronstadt rebellion; World War II
- Awards: Order of Lenin

Yakov Stepanovich Fokanov (Russian: Яков Степанович Фоканов; 7 December 1899 – 9 November 1985) was a Soviet Army lieutenant general.

Drafted into the Red Army during the Russian Civil War, he had become a junior officer by its end and would be steadily promoted during the interwar period. After commanding two other rifle divisions during the expansion of the army in the late 1930s, Fokanov became commander of the 154th Rifle Division in 1940, leading it during the Battle of Smolensk, in the first weeks after Operation Barbarossa, and the Kozelsk Offensive, after the latter of which it was converted to the 47th Guards Rifle Division for its actions. After a brief period as deputy commander of the 5th Tank Army, Fokanov became commander of the 29th Guards Rifle Corps in 1943 on the Eastern Front and was transferred to command the 29th Rifle Corps more than a year later. After commanding the latter in the fighting in Pomerania during the final months of the war and the early postwar period, he served in staff positions before being sent to China as an advisor to the People's Liberation Army in the late 1950s; this was his last position before dismissal to the reserve in 1959.

== Early life and Russian Civil War ==
Fokanov was born on 7 December 1899 in the village of Kononovo, Ustyuzhensky Uyezd, Novgorod Governorate to a peasant family. After graduating from the village school, he worked in the logging industry between 1912 and 1917 and then became a farmer. During the Russian Civil War, he was drafted into the Red Army on 15 March 1919 by the Ustyuzhinsky Uyezd military commissariat and sent to the ski detachment of the Petrograd garrison. He was then transferred to the 2nd Reserve Rifle Regiment, stationed at the Peter and Paul Fortress, to carry out guard duty. In the fall of 1919, Fokanov fought with a ski detachment on the Petrograd front against the White Northwestern Army. After the defeat of the Northwestern Army, he was sent to the regimental school of the 11th Reserve Rifle Regiment in December 1919. Upon graduation in November 1920, he became an assistant platoon leader in the regiment. After the latter was disbanded, Fokanov served in the same position with the 10th Reserve Rifle Regiment before being sent to study at the 7th Petrograd Red Commanders' Courses in January 1921. During March, with a cadet brigade, he fought in the suppression of the Kronstadt rebellion.

== Interwar period ==
From April 1921, after completing the courses, Fokanov served as a junior commander in the 10th Reserve Rifle Regiment, now part of the Petrograd Military District. When the latter was disbanded in June, he became an acting platoon commander in the machine gun regiment of the Petrograd Fortified Region. From October 1923, he studied at the 8th Petrograd Infantry Commanders' School, which was merged with the S.S. Kamenev Kiev Combined Military School in September 1924. After graduating from the latter in August 1925, Fokanov was placed at the disposal of the 135th Territorial Rifle Regiment and appointed an acting assistant platoon commander in its 9th Company. In October, he was transferred to the 138th Pereyaslav Rifle Regiment of the 46th Rifle Division of the Ukrainian Military District, with which he successively served as a platoon commander in the machine gun company, acting company commander, regimental treasurer, acting assistant regimental commander for economic units, and as a rifle company commander. Fokanov transferred to the 137th Rifle Regiment of the division in April 1931, serving as assistant and acting regimental chief of staff, then as chief of staff and battalion commander. From June 1934, he commanded the 57th Separate Machine Gun Battalion of the 54th Directorate of Construction Work – the Rîbnița Fortified Region of the Ukrainian Military District, which became part of the Kiev Military District when the latter split in May 1935. After serving as acting commander of the 259th Rifle Regiment of the 87th Rifle Division in the Kiev Military District from August 1937, Fokanov studied at the Vystrel course from November of that year until his graduation in August 1938. He was then appointed commander of the 87th's 16th Rifle Regiment, but in January 1939 took command of the 61st Rifle Division in the Volga Military District. Fokanov went on to command the 129th Rifle Division from August of that year, the 18th Reserve Brigade from January 1940, and the 154th Rifle Division from July of the latter year.

== World War II ==
Fokanov held the rank of kombrig when Operation Barbarossa, the German invasion of the Soviet Union, began in June 1941. In July the 154th became part of the 63rd Rifle Corps of the Western Front's 21st Army. During the Battle of Smolensk, the corps temporarily repulsed German attacks and recaptured Rogachev and Zhlobin in a counterattack on 13 July. For his "skilled leadership" of the division during the counterattack, Fokanov was promoted to major general on 31 July. He then led the division with the 3rd Army of the Central Front in defensive battles on the east bank of the Dnieper, preventing a German crossing near Loyev. The division fought in the Oryol–Bryansk and Tula defensive operations in September and the recapture of Kaluga during the Kaluga Offensive in December as part of the 50th Army, initially with the Bryansk and then the Western Front. In August 1942, the 154th fought in the Kozelsk Offensive against the German 2nd Panzer Army, after which the Soviets claimed to have inflicted heavy losses on the German forces and to have forced them onto the defensive. For its "courage and heroism" in the offensive, the division was converted into the 47th Guards Rifle Division. His superiors assessed Fokanov as having shown "bravery and skilled organization of the combined operations of different branches". After the division was transferred to the Southwestern Front in the Stalingrad area during October, Fokanov became deputy commander of the front's 5th Tank Army in December during the advance of the latter toward the Donbas.

From April 1943, Fokanov, promoted to lieutenant general on 28 April, commanded the 29th Guards Rifle Corps of the front's 8th Guards Army. He led it during the Donbas and Zaporizhia Offensives, during which it helped recapture Barvenkovo and Zaporizhia. For his leadership of the corps, Fokanov was awarded the Order of the Red Banner and the Order of Kutuzov, 2nd class. From 6 September 1944, he led the 29th Rifle Corps, which, as part of the 48th Army of the 2nd and then 3rd Belorussian Fronts, participated in the Mława–Elbing and East Pomeranian Offensives, during which it captured Maków, Maków Mazowiecki, Przasnysz, Allenstein, and Braunsberg. Subsequently, he distinguished himself in battles to destroy the German forces around Heilsberg, receiving the Order of Kutuzov, 1st class.

== Postwar ==
After the end of the war, Fokanov continued to command the 29th Rifle Corps. In April 1947, he was sent to the Higher Academic Courses at the Voroshilov Higher Military Academy, and upon graduation in May 1948 became assistant commander of the 6th Guards Mechanized Army in the Transbaikal Military District. From January 1953 he served as assistant commander and head of the combat training directorate of the 39th Army of the Primorsky Military District in Port Arthur. From February 1955 he served as assistant commander of troops and head of the combat training directorate of the Western Siberian Military District, continuing in that position for the reformed Siberian Military District from January 1956. Placed at the disposal of the Commander-in-Chief of the Ground Forces in March 1957, Fokanov was sent to the China as a senior military advisor to the commander of a People's Liberation Army military district in July of that year. Serving as a military specialist in the military district from January 1959, he was part of a contingent of senior military specialists advising PLA military district commanders. Dismissed to the reserve in May 1959, Fokanov died in Novosibirsk on 9 November 1985.

== Personal life ==
Fokanov married Nina Alexeyevna, who served as a nurse in the medical battalion of the 154th Rifle Division, in 1946; she had two children with him. He was survived by his wife.

== Awards and honors ==
- Order of Lenin
- Order of the Red Banner (5)
- Order of Kutuzov, 1st and 2nd classes
- Order of Suvorov, 2nd class
- Order of the Patriotic War, 1st class

A street in Zhlobin is named for him.
