= Bobovets =

- Village
- Location within Bulgaria
- Coordinates: 43°26′N 28°05′E
- Country: Bulgaria
- Province: Dobrich Province
- Municipality: Balchik
- Time zone: UTC+2 (EET)
  - Summer (DST): UTC+3 (EEST)

Bobovets is a village in Balchik Municipality, Dobrich Province, northeastern Bulgaria.

== Climate ==
The geographical location of the village features a temperate continental climate, with warm summers and relatively cold winters.
