= Gurkovo, Dobrich Province =

Gurkovo
- Village
- Location within Bulgaria
- Coordinates: 43°29′N 28°13′E
- Country: Bulgaria
- Province: Dobrich Province
- Municipality: Balchik
- Time zone: UTC+2 (EET)
  - Summer (DST): UTC+3 (EEST)

Gurkovo is a village in Balchik Municipality, Dobrich Province, northeastern Bulgaria. Between 1913 and 1940, during the Romanian rule, the village was called Rasoviceni.
