= Bryastovo, Haskovo Province =

- Village
- Location within Bulgaria
- Coordinates: 41°55′32″N 25°19′10″E
- Country: Bulgaria
- Province: Haskovo Province
- Municipality: Mineralni bani

Population (2016)
  - Total: ▲253
- Time zone: UTC+2 (EET)
  - Summer (DST): UTC+3 (EEST)

Bryastovo, Haskovo Province is a village in the municipality of Mineralni bani, in Haskovo Province, in southern Bulgaria.

As of 31 December 2016 the village of Bryastovo has 253 inhabitants. The village is almost entirely inhabited by ethnic Turks.
