= Dronova, Bryansk Oblast =

Dronova Дронова
- Selo
- Location within Bryansk Oblast Location within Russia
- Coordinates: 53°03′N 35°11′E
- Country: Russia
- Region: Bryansk Oblast
- District: Karachevsky District
- Time zone: UTC+3:00

Dronova (Russian: Дронова) is a rural locality (a selo) in Karachevsky District, Bryansk Oblast, Russia. The population was 300 as of 2010. There are 14 streets.

== Geography ==
Dronova is located 23 km southeast of Karachev (the district's administrative centre) by road. Karpovka is the nearest rural locality.
