= Rogachevo, Dmitrovsky District, Moscow Oblast =

Rogachevo Рогачево
- Village
- Location within Moscow Oblast Location within Russia
- Coordinates: 56°26′00″N 37°09′20″E
- Country: Russia
- Region: Moscow Oblast
- District: Dmitrovsky District
- Time zone: UTC+3:00

Rogachevo (Russian: Рогачёво) is a rural locality (a village) in Dmitrovsky District, Moscow Oblast, Russia. Population: 3,379 (2010 census); 3,409 (2002 census);
