= 269th Division =

269th Division may refer to:

- 269th Infantry Division, Wehrmacht, Germany
- 269th Rifle Division, Soviet Union

== See also ==
- List of military divisions by number
