= 234th Division =

234th Division may refer to:

- 234th Division (Imperial Japanese Army)
- 234th Rifle Division, Soviet Union

== See also ==
- List of military divisions by number
