= Vladimir Borisov =

Soviet general (1902–1941)

Vladimir Borisovich Borisov
- Borisov in 1940
- Born: 15 July 1902; Kharkov, Russian Empire
- Died: 30 June 1941 (aged 38) Radoshkovichi, Molodechnensky District, Minsk Oblast, Belorussian SSR, Soviet Union
- Allegiance: Russian SFSR; Soviet Union
- Branch: Red Army
- Service years: 1919–1941
- Rank: Major general
- Commands: 37th Rifle Division; 21st Rifle Corps
- Conflicts: Russian Civil War; World War II
- Awards: Order of Lenin; Order of the Patriotic War, 1st class

Vladimir Borisovich Borisov (Russian: Владимир Борисович Борисов; 15 July 1902 – 30 June 1941) was a Red Army major general.

A veteran of the Russian Civil War, Borisov served in command positions at military schools during the 1920s and in the late 1930s rose to division command after holding staff positions. Decorated for his command of the 37th Rifle Division during the Winter War, Borisov became commander of the 21st Rifle Corps in Belarus just before the outbreak of Operation Barbarossa. He was killed during the Battle of Białystok–Minsk in late June 1941 while leading his corps in a breakout attempt.

== Early life and Russian Civil War ==
A Ukrainian, Borisov was born on 15 July 1902 in Kharkov. He joined the Red Army in February 1919 during the Russian Civil War, becoming a Red Army man of the 1st Kharkov Regiment. Transferred to the 1st Chuguyev Regiment to serve as a platoon commander in June, he fought against the Armed Forces of South Russia on the Southern Front. Serving as officer for errands by the commander of a battalion of the 1st Reserve Regiment in Kharkov in January 1920, Borisov became a cadet and later junior adjutant at the Kharkov Infantry Command Courses of the Southwestern Front in February. After graduating from the courses, he became a platoon commander at the School of Red Officers in October.

== Interwar period ==
In June 1921 Borisov was sent to study in a tactics group at the Military Pedagogical Institute, but did not graduate because he was expelled due to illness. In January 1922 he was appointed assistant head of the reserve of the Kharkov Military District, then again sent to study in a tactics group at the Kiev Military Pedagogical School. After graduation in December of that year he serve at the 1st VTsIK Red Officers School as a platoon commander, tactics instructor, company commander, and battalion commander.

In April 1936, after graduating from the Frunze Military Academy, he was sent to the staff of the Belorussian Military District, where he served as assistant chief of the 1st department and in February 1938 became chief of the 3rd section of the department. The chief of the 1st department, Colonel Leonid Sandalov, assessed Borisov as an "energetic and enterprising commander" who possessed "great capacity for work". General Rodion Malinovsky, on the district staff, wrote that Borisov's work and conversations in this period with him showed that Borisov was "unconditionally devoted to the Socialist Homeland". From August 1939 he commanded the 37th Rifle Division of the Belorussian Special Military District. Promoted to kombrig on 4 November 1939, Borisov led the division in the Winter War. On the night of 9–10 March 1940, Borisov personally commanded the 247th Rifle Regiment of the division in the capture of the island of Vuorastu, which enabled the 168th Rifle Division to escape from encirclement. For his "skillful leadership" of the division in this action and "demonstrated personal courage and heroism," Borisov was awarded the Order of Lenin. Given the rank of major general on 4 June 1940 when the Red Army introduced general officer ranks, he became commander of the 21st Rifle Corps of the Western Special Military District (the former Belorussian Military District) in March 1941.

== World War II ==
After the beginning of Operation Barbarossa, the German invasion of the Soviet Union, on 22 June 1941, Borisov led the corps as part of the 13th Army of the Western Front in the Battle of Białystok–Minsk, utilizing the fortifications of Minsk Fortified Region, against the German 3rd Panzer Group in the Lida region. His corps attacked piecemeal and retreated precipitately towards Minsk. In late June the 3rd and 2nd Panzer Groups broke through the Western Front defenses on the flanks of the corps, encircling the 3rd, 10th, and 13th Armies in a pocket west of Minsk. While riding on a tank and directing the retreat of the 37th Rifle Division during the breakout attempt of the corps on 30 June, Borisov was killed by a German shell during a bombardment in the area of the town of Radoshkovichi, and was buried in the town cemetery.

== Awards and honors ==
Borisov received the following awards and decorations:

- Order of Lenin (1940)
- Order of the Patriotic War, 1st class (1965)
- Jubilee Medal "XX Years of the Workers' and Peasants' Red Army" (1938)
