= Luka Basanets =

Soviet military officer

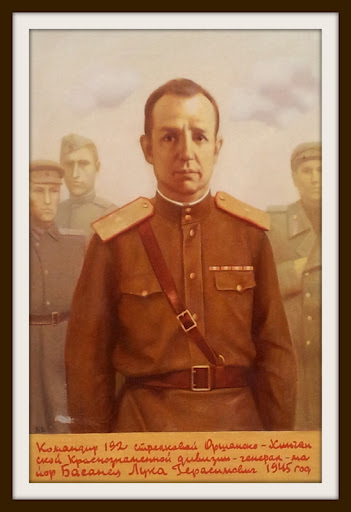
- Born: 1898; Kukshyn, Chernigov Governorate, Russian Empire (now in Chernihiv Oblast, Ukraine)
- Died: 1962 (aged 63–64); Odesa, Ukrainian Soviet Socialist Republic, Soviet Union (now Ukraine)
- Military career
- Allegiance: Russian Empire (under Provisional Government); Soviet Russia; Soviet Union
- Branch: (Russia) Imperial Russian Army; Red Army
- Rank: Major-general
- Commands: 140th Rifle Division (August 1939 – September 1941); 235th Rifle Division (July 1943 – October 1943); 192nd Rifle Division (October 1944 – October 1945)
- Conflicts: World War I; Russian Civil War; World War II
- Awards: Order of the Red Banner and other awards

Luka Herasymovych Basanets (Ukrainian: Лука́ Гера́симович Басане́ць, Russian: Лука́ Гера́симович Басане́ц; 1898 - 1962) was a Soviet military officer who led the Red Army's 140th Rifle Division, shattered by the German invasion of the Soviet Union in the summer of 1941. He joined the Soviet partisans behind the German front lines in September 1941.

Rejoining the Red Army after two years with the partisans, Colonel Basanets was appointed commanding officer of the 235th Rifle Division in 1943 and commanding officer of the 192nd Rifle Division in 1944–1945.

Promoted to major-general on 6 May 1945, he led the 192nd Rifle Division during the Soviet invasion of Japanese Manchuria (Manchukuo) in August 1945.

== Biography ==
Luka Basanets was born in 1898 in the Chernigov Governorate village of Kukshyn in the Russian Empire (now in Chernihiv Oblast, Ukraine). He was an ethnic Ukrainian from a peasant family.

Basanets entered the military during World War I, having been conscripted into the Imperial Russian Army for service as a private in February 1917. He joined the newly formed Red Army of Soviet Russia in 1918 and became a member of the Bolshevik Party in 1919.

Basanets fought on the Western Front of the Russian Civil War from August 1918 until February 1920, then went on to Moscow to attend the Red Army's 1st Moscow Infantry Course from February 1920 to July 1920. He later attended infantry courses in Kyiv in 1921-1923 and the Vystrel Higher Infantry Officers' Courses in 1928–1929. A platoon and company commander in the 1920s, he was promoted to battalion commander in 1929 and studied at the Frunze Military Academy in 1932–1936.

Basanets worked in the military intelligence service after his graduation from the Frunze Military Academy, serving at the disposal of the Intelligence Directorate of the Red Army Staff in May 1936. Awarded the Order of the Red Banner in 1937, he was next named an assistant of the commanding officer of the 51st Rifle Division in December 1938.

He was relieved of his assignment with the 51st Rifle Division to take control of the 140th Rifle Division as commanding officer in August 1939. Part of the 36th Rifle Corps of Lieutenant-General Ivan Muzychenko's 6th Army at the time of the German invasion of the Soviet Union in June 1941, the 140th Division sustained heavy casualties in early July 1941. The division was subsequently encircled and destroyed by the Germans, though Basanets managed to escape, joining the Soviet partisans to fight behind the German front lines in September 1941. He managed to cross through the German lines after two years with the partisans, rejoining the regular army in 1943.

Colonel Basanets was named commanding officer of the 235th Rifle Division of Lieutenant-General Konstantin Golubev's 43rd Army in July 1943 in place of Colonel Alexey Kubasov, who was reassigned to take charge of the 269th. He was succeeded as commander of the 235th by Colonel Andrey Yatsun in October 1943.

In October 1944, Colonel Basanets succeeded the wounded Colonel Konstantin Popov as commander of the 192nd Rifle Division of Lieutenant-General (later Colonel-General) Ivan Lyudnikov's 39th Army. Alongside the rest of the 39th Army, the division took part in the East Prussian Offensive in the East Prussia Province of Germany as part of Army General Ivan Chernyakhovsky's 3rd Belorussian Front in late 1944 - early 1945.

Promoted to major-general, on 6 May 1945, Basanets led the 192nd Rifle Division during the Soviet war with Imperial Japan in the August 1945 invasion of Manchuria (Manchukuo), for which the 39th Army crossed the Greater Khingan on the Mongolia-Manchukuo border, fighting as part of Marshal Rodion Malinovsky's Transbaikal Front.

Major-General Basanets remained with the 192nd Rifle Division until its return to the Soviet Union in October 1945, a month after the Japanese surrender at the end of World War II.

Major-General Basanets retired after the war. He died in Odesa in 1962.
