= 235th Rifle Division =

235th Rifle Division (March 14, 1941 - December 27, 1941) 235th Rifle Division (December 3, 1941 - July 1946)
- Active: 1941–1946
- Country: Soviet Union
- Branch: Red Army
- Type: Infantry
- Size: Division
- Engagements: Operation Barbarossa; Baltic operation Leningrad strategic defensive Battle of Demyansk (1943); Operation Polyarnaya Zvezda; Battle of Kursk; Operation Kutuzov; Battle of Nevel (1943); Operation Bagration; Vitebsk–Orsha offensive Baltic offensive Šiauliai offensive Battle of Memel; East Prussian offensive Battle of Königsberg; Samland offensive
- Decorations: Order of the Red Banner (2nd formation); Order of Suvorov (2nd formation)
- Battle honours: Vitebsk (2nd formation)

Commanders
- Notable commanders: Maj. Gen. Timofei Vasilevich Lebedev; Col. Said-Garei Gaifutdinovich Gaifutdinov; Col. Filipp Nikolaevich Romashin; Col. Luka Gerasimovich Basanets; Col. Andrei Glebovich Yatsun; Col. Pavel Filippovich Kuklin; Maj. Gen. Ivan Lukich Lutskevich

The 235th Rifle Division was an infantry division of the Red Army, originally formed in the months just before the start of the German invasion, based on the shtat (table of organization and equipment) of September 13, 1939. As part of the 41st Rifle Corps it was soon sent to Northwestern Front to defend the distant approaches to Leningrad. Along with its Corps the division became part of the Luga Operational Group. After Novgorod was captured the Luga Group was largely encircled and had to fight its way north toward the city, suffering considerable losses in the process. The losses to the 235th were greater than those of some others and after officially carrying on in the reserves of Leningrad Front for some time the division was officially disbanded in late December.

A new division, originally numbered as the 454th, began forming in the Siberian Military District in early December and was soon redesignated as the 2nd formation of the 235th. After forming it was assigned to 53rd Army in Northwestern Front and served in the battles around the Demyansk Pocket into early 1943. During Operation Kutuzov it took part in the battles that liberated Oryol, and then went into the reserves before moving north to join 4th Shock Army. As part of 1st Baltic Front it was involved in the grinding battles around the Vitebsk salient through the winter of 1943/44, mostly as part of 43rd Army. Early in the summer offensive the division won a battle honor, and then advanced into the Baltic states, receiving the Order of the Red Banner for its part in the fighting southwest of Riga. In January 1945 the 235th advanced into East Prussia and spent nearly the remainder of the war there, winning further distinctions in the battle for Königsberg. It remained in service into the following year but was disbanded in July 1946.

== 1st Formation ==
The division began forming on March 14, 1941, at Kineshma and Ivanovo in the Moscow Military District. When completed it had the following order of battle:

- 732nd Rifle Regiment
- 801st Rifle Regiment
- 806th Rifle Regiment
- 670th Artillery Regiment
- 682nd Howitzer Artillery Regiment
- 217th Antitank Battalion
- 11th Antiaircraft Battalion
- 289th Reconnaissance Battalion
- 369th Sapper Battalion
- 607th Signal Battalion
- 384th Medical/Sanitation Battalion
- 326th Chemical Defense (Anti-gas) Company
- 702nd Motor Transport Battalion
- 450th Field Bakery
- 676th Field Postal Station
- 544th Field Office of the State Bank

Maj. Gen. Timofei Vasilevich Lebedev was appointed to command on the day the division began forming and would lead it for the duration of this formation. This officer had previously led the 40th Rifle Division but had more recently served in the training establishment. At the time of the German invasion the division was still unfinished and only had a week to complete its formation before it joined the fighting front on June 30. At this time it was part of the 41st Rifle Corps with the 111th and 118th Rifle Divisions.

=== Defense of Leningrad ===
When it arrived at the front the 41st Corps came under the command of the 11th Army of Northwestern Front in the Pskov area. On July 4 the Red Army's chief of staff, Army Gen. G. K. Zhukov, ordered Lt. Gen. M. M. Popov's Northern Front to "immediately occupy a defense line along the Narva-Luga-Staraya Russa-Borovichi front". Popov formed the Luga Operational Group on July 6 and by July 14 the 41st Corps, which now also contained the 90th Rifle Division had been subordinated to it.

4th Panzer Group resumed its advance from it bridgehead east of the Velikaya River between Pskov and Ostrov on July 10. Although summer heat and difficult terrain delayed the pace of the blitzkrieg the panzers were still gaining about 30km per day. With the failure to halt the advance, Popov split up the Operational Group on July 23 into three separate sector commands. The Luga Sector came under the command of Maj. Gen. A. N. Astinin and was ordered to protect the Luga Highway axis south of Leningrad. His forces consisted of the 111th, 177th, and 235th Rifle Divisions and the 2nd Tank Division, plus assorted smaller units.

On August 8 Hitler ordered that Army Group North be reinforced with large armored forces and air support in preparation for a final drive on the city. Two days later elements of the LVI Motorized Corps, supported by the I and XXVIII Army Corps, advanced along the Luga and Novgorod axes toward the southern and southwestern approaches to Leningrad. The three Corps tore into and through the partially prepared defenses of the Luga Group and advanced on Krasnogvardeysk, while the 48th Army was forced out of Chudova and Tosno. These advances cut the line of communications to the Luga Group, which had to give up the town August 20. Fighting in encirclement, the nine Soviet divisions, including the 235th, had to cut their way out to the north and east in small parties, harried continually by the 8th Panzer, 4th SS, 269th and 96th Infantry Divisions conducting constant converging attacks on the Group from all sides. The German command estimated Red Army losses at 30,000 men, 120 tanks and 400 guns among the encircled forces.

As of September 1 the 235th was still in 41st Corps which was assigned to the Southern Operational Group of Leningrad Front, which had been formed on August 27 from part of Northern Front. Remnants of the division took up positions near Pushkin, but by now the combined strength of the 235th, 177th Rifle and 24th Tank Divisions was no more than 2,000 men. On September 8 elements of Army Group North captured Shlisselburg, completing the land blockade of Leningrad. Under the circumstances there was no immediate prospect of rebuilding these divisions and, although it was still officially in the reserves of Leningrad Front on October 1 it had disappeared a month later, although it was not officially abolished until nearly the end of December. By this time General Lebedev had been given command of the 191st Rifle Division; he was also serving as the deputy chief-of-staff of 4th Army. He was killed in action on January 26, 1942 during fighting along the Volkhov River when he was blown up by a German antitank mine.

== 2nd Formation ==
A new division, originally numbered as the 454th, began forming at Novosibirsk in the Siberian Military District on December 3, 1941, based on the shtat of July 29, but on January 7, 1942 it was redesignated as the 2nd formation of the 235th. Once formed its order of battle was very similar to that of the 1st formation:

- 732nd Rifle Regiment
- 801st Rifle Regiment
- 806th Rifle Regiment
- 682nd Artillery Regiment
- 217th Antitank Battalion
- 132nd Antiaircraft Battery (until March 15, 1943)
- 123rd Mortar Battalion (until November 10, 1942)
- 500th Reconnaissance Company
- 369th Sapper Battalion
- 607th Signal Battalion (later 607th Signal Company)
- 384th Medical/Sanitation Battalion
- 326th Chemical Defense (Anti-gas) Company
- 588th Motor Transport Company
- 441st Field Bakery
- 906th Divisional Veterinary Hospital
- 1701st Field Postal Station
- 1071st Field Office of the State Bank

Col. Said-Garei Gaifutdinovich Gaifutdinov, a Tatar by nationality, was appointed to command the day the division began forming. He had previously served as chief-of-staff of the 194th and 245th Rifle Divisions as well as a senior political instructor. Once it completed recruiting the 235th had 11,733 personnel on strength, 50.4 percent of whom were under 25 years of age, a youthful cadre in good physical condition but most of whom had never had any military experience or peacetime training. As a result the division spent three months in Siberia training and a further two months in the Reserve of the Supreme High Command, eventually as part of 58th Army. When it arrived at the fighting front on April 26 it was assigned to 53rd Army in Northwestern Front near Demyansk.

=== Demyansk Pocket ===
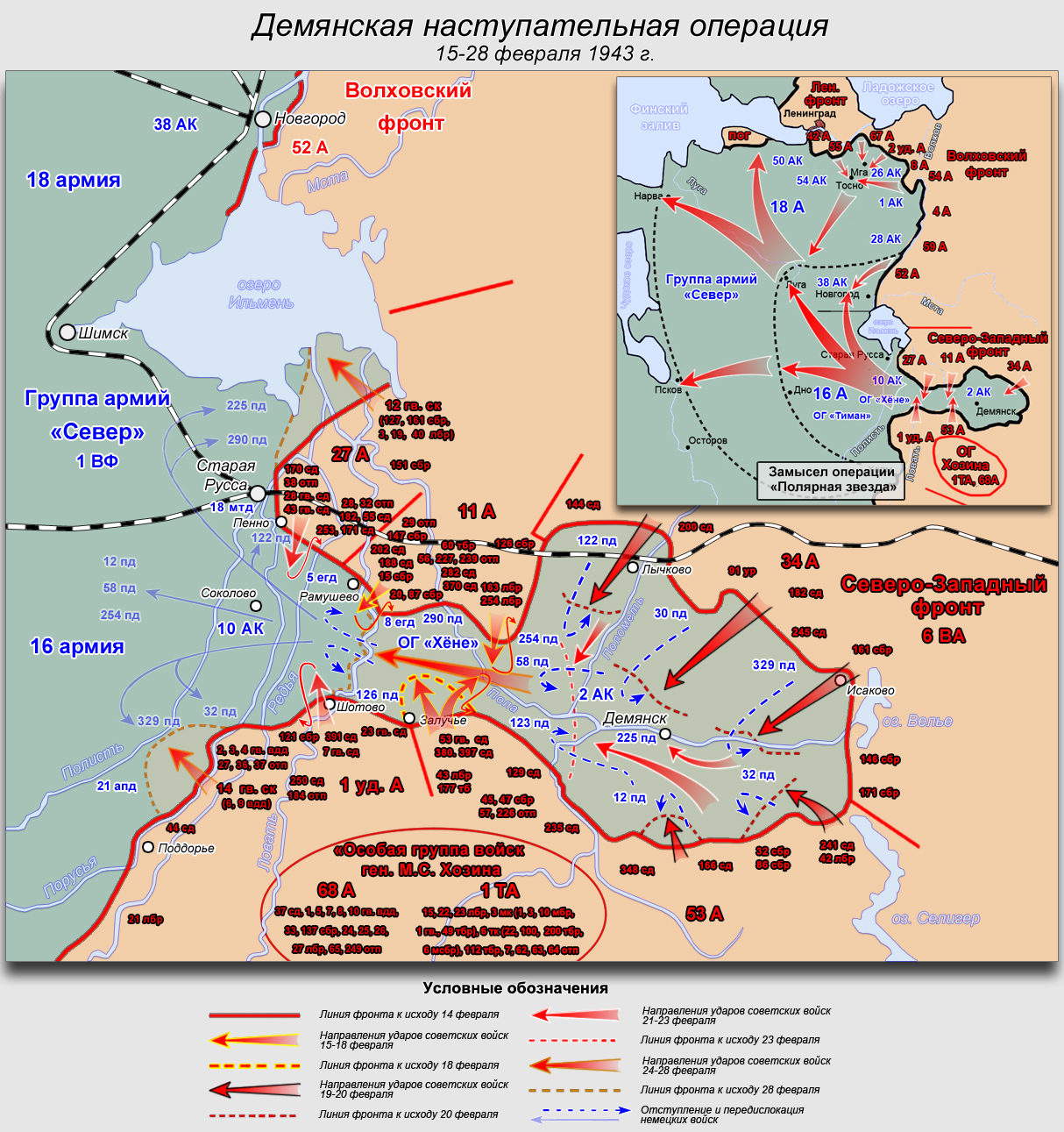
Soviet positions at Demyansk, spring 1943. The 235th was in the 53rd Army sector southwest of Demyansk.

By the time the division arrived the German II Army Corps in and around Demyansk had been partly relieved with the creation of the Ramushevo Corridor as a land line of communications to 16th Army, but this was a tenuous link and the pocketed troops still largely relied on air supply. 53rd Army contained the 166th, 235th, 241st and 250th Rifle Divisions as well as two rifle brigades and a number of ski battalions, and was assigned to contain the southern side of the pocket. An attempt in the first half of May by 11th Army and 1st Shock Army to close the corridor was a failure and the Front was given much of June to rebuild for a deliberate offensive in July. This began on the 17th and was also stymied with significant casualties, but 53rd Army played little role. A renewed effort in August followed a very similar pattern except the 53rd, 27th and 34th Armies around the periphery were ordered to launch local attacks; these were easily fended off by the well-fortified defenders. Colonel Gaifutdinov had left the division on July 14 to take command of the 91st Fortified Region and was replaced by Col. Filipp Nikolaevich Romashin, who had previously commanded the 370th Rifle Division.

On January 31, 1943, the German High Command ordered that the Demyansk salient be evacuated, in the wake of the encirclement and upcoming destruction of 6th Army at Stalingrad. By this time most of Northwestern Front's best divisions were battered wrecks. Not knowing the German plan, Marshal G. K. Zhukov was making plans for his Operation Polyarnaya Zvezda to finally crush the salient as a preliminary to the relief of Leningrad. The division had been earmarked for this operation, which began on February 15, 1943, but was repulsed with heavy losses. Operation Ziethen began on February 17, at which time the 235th was northwest of the village of Molvotitsy. 53rd Army attempted to harass the withdrawing forces, primarily with ski troops, but the German withdrawal freed up the reserves they needed to reinforce their lines along the Lovat River, and the "pursuit" through the devastated landscape achieved little. Colonel Romashin had been wounded and hospitalized on January 18 and was replaced in command by his deputy, Col. Anisim Illarionovich Svetlyakov, but after his recovery Romashin returned on March 11.

=== Operation Kutuzov ===
On the same date the STAVKA disbanded Bryansk Front and formed a new Reserve Front, based on the former Front's headquarters. Order No. 30071 stated (in part):

"2. The Reserve Front will include: a) The 2nd Reserve Army, consisting of the 129th, 235th, 250th, 348th, 380th, and 397th Rifle Divisions, re-stationed in the Yelets, Lipetsk, and Lebedyan regions..."

This redeployment was in response to the continuing German successes in the Third Battle of Kharkov. In April the 2nd Reserve was redesignated as 63rd Army, and was assigned to the re-formed Bryansk Front. In May the 235th was moved to 3rd Army, still in Bryansk Front, where it would remain into July.

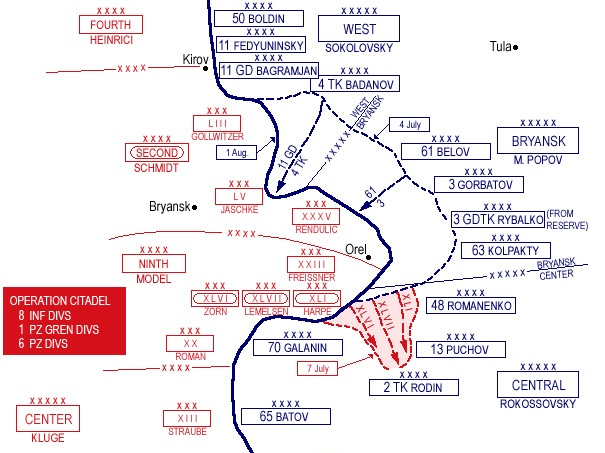
Map of Operation Kutuzov. Note position of 3rd Army.

In the preparation for the summer offensive against the German-held Oryol salient the commander of 3rd Army, Lt. Gen. A. V. Gorbatov, formed a shock group of three rifle divisions on his left flank. The 235th and 380th were in the first echelon with the 308th Rifle Division in second echelon. The first echelon was reinforced with the 82nd and 114th Tank Regiments, an antitank regiment, and two self-propelled artillery regiments, including the 1538th (SU-152s). The 308th was planned to be committed on the morning of the second day. The Army's mission was to force the Zusha River, break through the German defense along the 9km sector from Izmailovo to Vyazhi before developing the offensive in the general direction of Staraya Otrada. Upon the shock group reaching the line Dobrovody–Protasovo part of its forces would turn north to encircle and destroy the German Mtsensk grouping in conjunction with the 61st Army.

The offensive was originally scheduled to begin on July 11, but was postponed by 24 hours. Instead, the 3rd and 63rd Armies were ordered to carry out reconnaissance along the planned breakthrough sectors and, ideally, seize the first line of German trenches. This was to be carried out by picked battalions from each first echelon division with 3-5 tanks in immediate support. At 1150 hours on July 11, following a powerful artillery onslaught, the battalions crossed the Zusha and immediately encountered heavy rifle and machine gun fire. The 235th's battalion, which was attacking south of Maloe Izmailovo, suffered severe losses due to flanking fire from this strongpoint, called off the attack and soon fell back to its jumping-off position. The battalion of the 380th Division, on the other hand, achieved its objective.

The main offensive by the two Armies began with an artillery preparation at 0200 hours on July 12 by more than 4,000 guns and mortars. The rifle divisions forded the Zusha and by 0530 arrived at the German trenches. Ten minutes later a salvo from the Guards mortar units signalled the attack. Under this powerful fire the German forces put up weak resistance. Units of the 235th, despite the fact that the 114th Tanks could not cross the river near Izmailovo and was forced to divert to Vyazhi, broke through the German defense along its sector and by 1100 had captured Height 246.7. The 380th took advantage of this success and moved forward along its right flank. The German command reacted with heavy air attacks before noon and fresh infantry and tank forces were rushed to the breakthrough area. Several battalions of the 12th Panzer Division were brought up from Oryol and the division, now east of Yevtekhovo, was subjected to repeated counterattacks from several directions. Despite this the 235th and 380th had penetrated as far as 7km by day's end.

At 2115 hours the Front command ordered the 1st Guards Tank Corps to cross the Zusha and concentrate, in preparation for the two divisions reaching a line from Yevtekhovo to Grachevka, at which point the armor would enter the breach. At 0800 on July 13 the 235th, under cover of powerful artillery and air attacks, enveloped Yevtekhovo from the flanks and, following a short but stubborn battle, completely destroyed the German garrison and captured the village. Pursuing the subunits of the 171st Infantry Regiment (56th Infantry Division), which were retreating in disorder, by noon the division had reached the outskirts of Krasnyi. During the day the shock group had completed its assignments, creating the conditions for the commitment of 1st Guards Tanks, although this was delayed due to German air attacks. Despite these successes, Colonel Romashin was relieved of his command this day for organizational inefficiency and for the loss of control of his units in battle. He was transferred to the reserve. He was temporarily replaced by Col. Alexei Fyodorovich Kubasov, but this officer was in turn replaced on July 29 by Col. Luka Gerasimovich Basanets, who had previously commanded the 140th Rifle Division. Romashin's eclipse was short-lived; he was given command of the 135th Rifle Division on August 20 and would lead it for the duration, being promoted to the rank of major general on April 20, 1945.

On July 14 two German infantry battalions with tanks launched a powerful attack against the division's flank from the north, while a similar force struck the 308th Division. Both of these were repulsed with losses. As the Soviet offensive developed to the northwest the 56th Infantry continued to be worn down until by July 16 the 3rd Army's forces had reached the line of the Oleshnya River. The 235th overcame stubborn resistance to reach Leninskii Farm with its right flank, while its left flank consolidated northwest of Height 245.3. This line had been well-prepared in advance and the German command now threw in all available reserves to hold it. General Gorbatov decided to attack on the morning of July 17. This would be led by the newly-arrived 25th Rifle Corps. The 235th was tasked with tying down German forces with active operations along the Leninskii–Avvakumovskii sector with one rifle battalion while its remaining forces launched an attack along the front Avvakumovskii–Height 245.3 in the direction of Dobrovody. The assault began at 1130 hours, following a 10-minute artillery and aviation onslaught. Much of the German artillery had escaped this preparation and fired intensively. Units of the division, cooperating with the 269th Rifle Division, twice attempted to break the defense, but were forced to fall back to their starting positions.

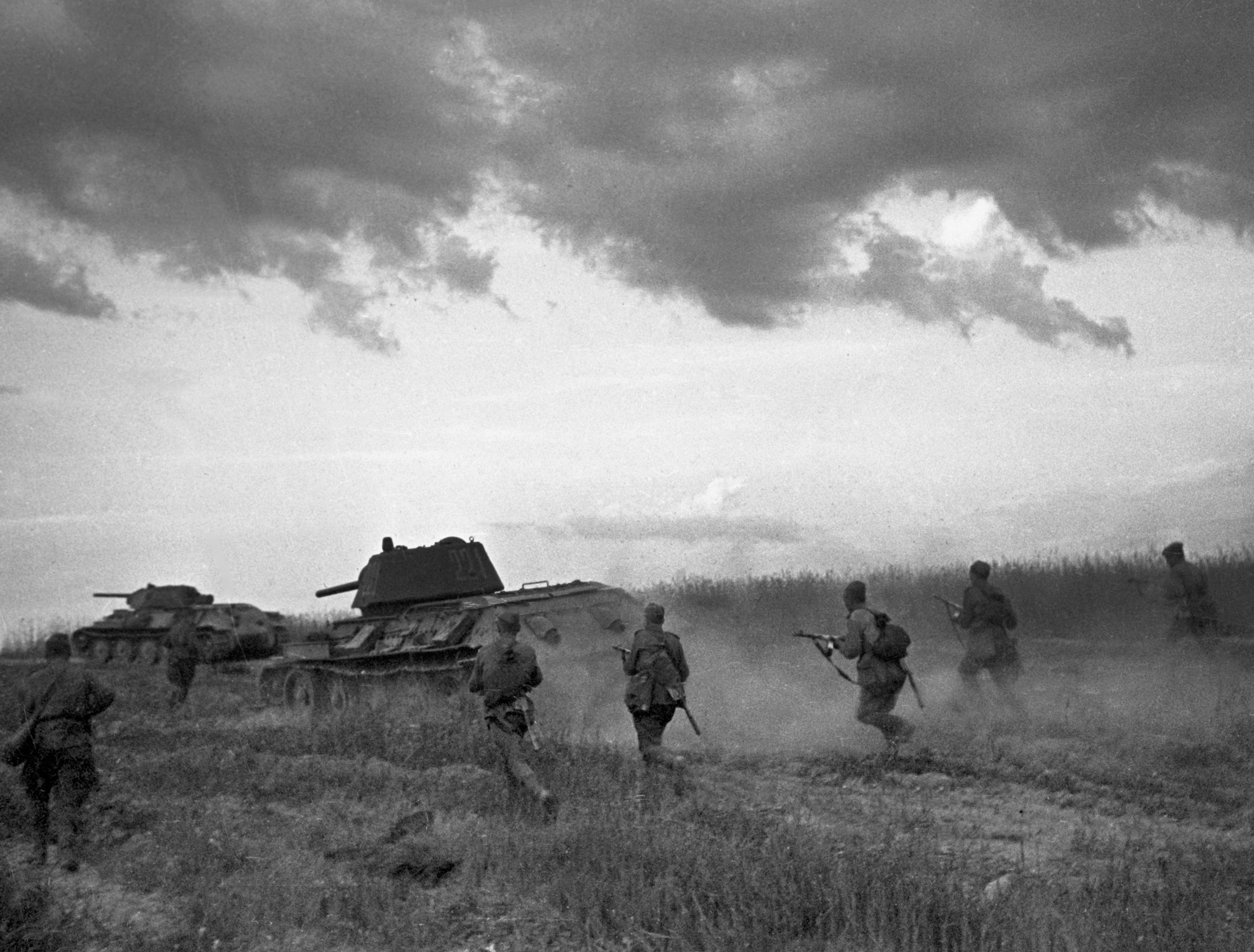
Infantry of Bryansk Front advance with supporting T-34s

Under these circumstances the Front command decided to commit the 3rd Guards Tank Army to re-establish the momentum of the offensive. During July 18 German infantry and tanks repeatedly counterattacked along the entire 3rd Army front. At 0800 the next day the 3rd and 63rd Armies resumed their attack following a 10-minute artillery preparation. Supported by air attacks, 3rd Army's infantry and tanks broke through the defense, forcing the 2nd and 8th Panzer Divisions to fall back to the west. The 269th and 235th Divisions, having broken the forward edge of the defense of the 56th Infantry and units of 2nd Panzer, captured the villages of Bugry and Avvakumovskii. Overall the Oleshnya line was completely compromised, creating conditions for the commitment of 3rd Guards Tanks, which began at 1040 hours. As a result of this breakthrough the position of the German Mtsensk grouping was seriously threatened and overnight the German command decided to pull back behind the Oka River. Mtsensk was liberated by the 342nd Rifle Division on the morning of July 20. Gorbatov was determined to encircle and destroy the retreating grouping and on the morning of July 21 the 342nd and 235th Divisions were ordered to carry out this mission. In an energetic advance the 235th cut the paved road from Mtsensk to Oryol at 0400. Small groups of unsupervised German soldiers stretched along the road to the southwest, as well as individual vehicles and supply trains. Having left a powerful screen facing to the north, Colonel Kubasov dispatched his main forces toward Naryshkino, which was captured during the latter half of the day. Between the 3rd and 61st Armies a significant part of the Mtsensk grouping had been encircled and during the following day the two rifle divisions mopped up the pocket. About 200 German officers and men were killed and a large number taken prisoner, plus a good deal of equipment was captured.

==== Drive on Oryol ====
General Gorbatov now set his sights on Oryol. On the morning of July 22 elements of the 235th attempted to break out of their bridgehead over the Oka at Bogatishchevo but were unsuccessful. In light of this and other failures Gorbatov decided to consolidate along the river, bring up his artillery and prepare his crossing equipment. The Oka had also been prepared in advance as a defensive line. The Front command directed that the offensive resume on July 25 with 3rd Army attacking toward Oryol from the north and northwest while 63rd Army did the same from the south and southeast. Gorbatov chose to make his main effort with his right flank with the 235th, 269th and 283rd Rifle Divisions, the 25th Rifle Corps, and the 17th Tank Brigade, in the general direction of Andrianovo, Nelbova and Raspopovskie Dvoriki. The 235th was specifically ordered to defend the line Kikino–Novaya Slobodka, with the 801st Rifle Regiment behind the right flank, ready commit behind the 269th. Once the division arrived at the line from Paslovo to Ivanovskaya Optukha the 308th Division was to launch an attack along the railroad toward Oryol.

As these preparations were being made the German forces were hastily constructing new defensive works as well as conducting artillery and mortar bombardments backed by air attacks. The latter particularly affected the 269th and 235th Divisions. Despite these measures the German command was preparing to evacuate the Oryol area. Once the offensive resumed it made relatively slow progress and Gorbatov was forced to call a halt late on July 27, with orders to hold the present line and prepare to attack on July 30. Fierce fighting continued through July 31 but faced heavy counterattacks, including during that night, but this proved to be a cover for the withdrawal. 3rd Army went over to the pursuit on August 1, gaining 12-14km during the day. Oryol was liberated on August 4, and on the same day the 235th was withdrawn into the Reserve of the Supreme High Command for a much-needed rest and rebuilding. At the beginning of September it was the sole division under 20th Army in the Reserve.

== Into Western Russia and Belarus ==
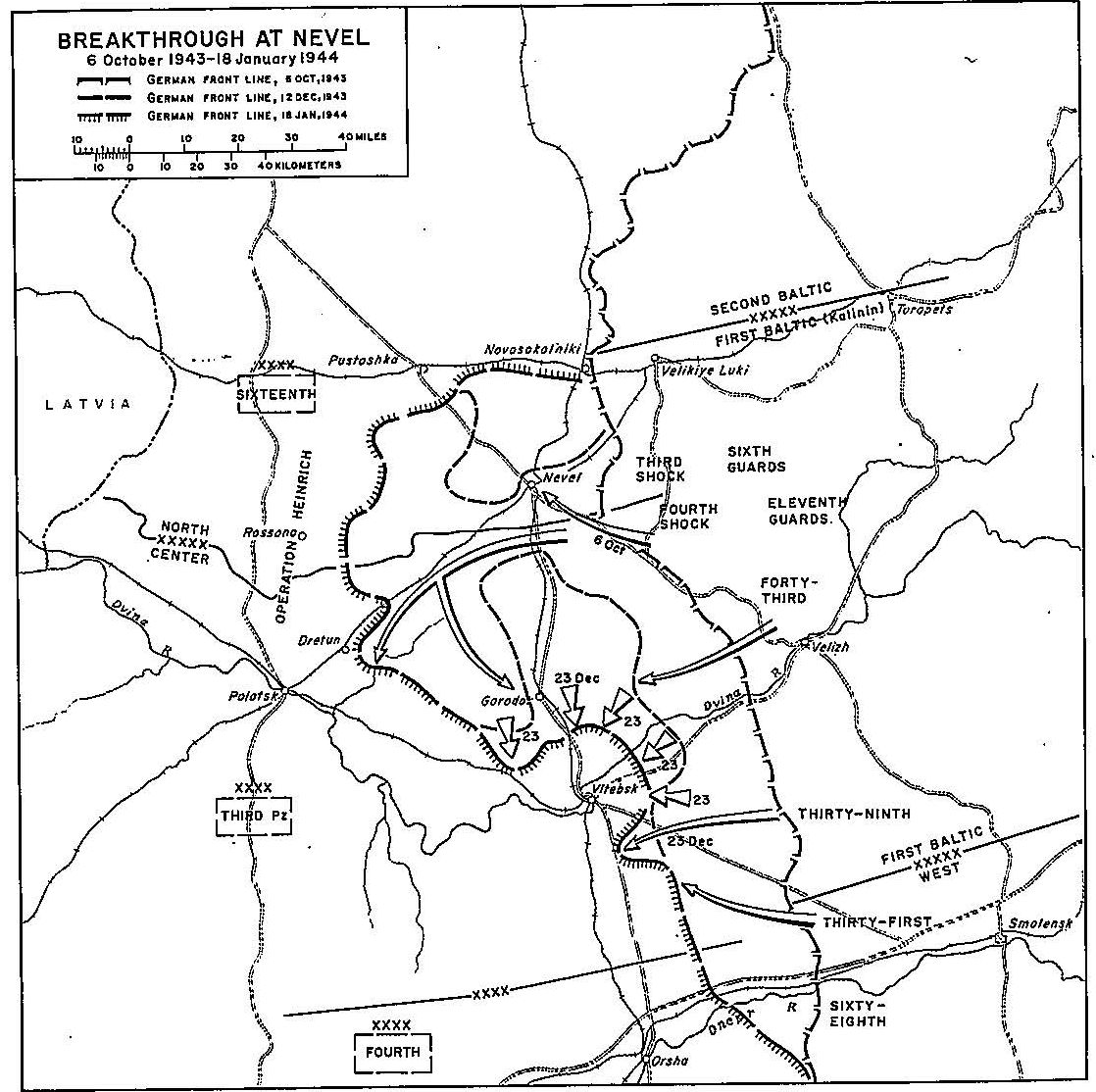
The Nevel Salient, October 6, 1943 to January 18, 1944

When the division returned to the active front on September 27 it had moved a considerable distance to the north and west, joining the 83rd Rifle Corps of 4th Shock Army in Kalinin Front. As the Kalinin and Western Fronts battled into western Russia the STAVKA issued orders to the commander of the former, Army Gen. A. I. Yeryomenko, on September 19 to prepare a new operation to finally take Velizh, which was done the next day. Following this success the High Command set its sights on Vitebsk. Yeryomenko wrote on September 22 that he would "make the main attack with the 4th Shock, 43rd, and 39th Armies in the general direction of Vitebsk. To that end I will reinforce 4th Shock Army with four rifle divisions (the 234th, 235th, 117th, and 16th Lithuanian Rifle Divisions)..." Days later he began planning a supporting operation by 3rd Shock Army toward Nevel, which was an important railroad and road center and a large supply base; its liberation would go some way toward outflanking Vitebsk from the north.

=== Battle of Nevel ===
The offensive began at 0500 hours on October 6 with a reconnaissance-in-force, followed by a 90-minute artillery preparation at 0840 hours and airstrikes by 21st Assault Aviation Regiment. 3rd Shock went over to the attack at 1000 hours on the Zhigary-Shliapy sector, precisely at the boundary between Army Groups North and Center. 28th Rifle Division spearheaded the assault in the first echelon followed closely by an exploitation echelon consisting of the 21st Guards Rifle Division and the 78th Tank Brigade with 54 tanks. The assaulting force struck and demolished the 2nd Luftwaffe Field Division. Nevel itself was taken by a flying column by the end of the day. Meanwhile, 4th Shock launched its attack toward Gorodok. The Army commander, Maj. Gen. V. I. Shvetsov, had formed a shock group from two of his rifle corps, each advancing abreast in three echelons. 2nd Guards Rifle Corps led with its 360th Rifle Division, followed by 117th and 16th Lithuanian Divisions and two tank brigades. 83rd Corps had its 47th Rifle Division up, supported by 234th, 235th and 381st Rifle Divisions and another two tank brigades. Although there were no further panicked withdrawals by units of II Luftwaffe Field Corps the attack gained about 20km but ultimately faltered just short of the Nevel-Gorodok-Vitebsk railroad and highway.

Despite this initial success, for reasons that remain uncertain Yeryomenko reined in his advancing forces on October 9 and by the next day German reserves had managed to cordon off the huge salient, which thwarted any immediate push toward Vitebsk. After mid-month 4th Shock conducted nearly constant operations either to improve its positions or defend against German counterattacks. A more determined effort began on October 17 when 83rd Corps and 2nd Guards Corps struck the 129th Infantry Division and the flank and rear of II Luftwaffe Corps, threatening to collapse the defenses north of Vitebsk. In response the 20th Panzer Division, although it had fewer than 20 tanks on strength, was ordered to counterattack and managed to contain the advance after two days of heavy fighting. Nevertheless the Luftwaffe troops were forced to withdraw to new defensive positions. On October 20 Kalinin Front was redesignated as 1st Baltic Front; at about this time Yeryomenko reported that his rifle divisions had been reduced to from 3,500 - 4,500 personnel each.

=== Polotsk-Vitebsk Offensive ===
Colonel Basanets left the division on October 24 and was replaced the next day by Col. Andrei Glebovich Yatsun. The former would go on to lead the 192nd and 39th Rifle Divisions, while the latter had previously commanded the 15th Rifle Brigade and the 118th Fortified Region.

In an early morning fog on November 2 the 3rd and 4th Shock Armies penetrated the defenses of the left flank of 3rd Panzer Army southwest of Nevel. After the breakthrough, which opened a 16km-wide gap, 3rd Shock turned to the north behind the flank of 16th Army while 4th Shock moved southwest behind 3rd Panzer Army. While 4th Shock's 60th Rifle Corps formed the shock group for this attack the 83rd Corps launched local attacks and protected the 60th's left flank. At the same time the Front's 43rd and 39th Armies were also attacking eastward along the Smolensk–Vitebsk road. Due to increasing German resistance and deteriorating weather the Soviet advance was brought to a temporary halt on November 11. The STAVKA ordered a regrouping which resulted in 83rd Corps moving to 43rd Army on November 14 with the objective of cutting the rail line between Zhukovo and Ezerishche. In another regrouping later in the month the Corps went to 11th Guards Army, still in 1st Baltic Front.

=== Gorodok Offensive ===
By this time forces of 3rd Panzer Army were still clinging to a deep salient running north from Gorodok to not far south of Nevel, deeply flanked by 4th Shock to the west and the remainder of 1st Baltic Front to the east. For the new operation the 11th Guards and 4th Shock Armies, with tank and cavalry support, "were to penetrate the enemy's defenses on the flanks of the Gorodok salient, encircle and destroy his grouping by concentric attacks in the direction of Bychikha Station, and then capture Gorodok and Vitebsk while developing the attack to the south." The 43rd and 39th Armies would support the attack. At this time 83rd Corps had only the 234th and 235th Divisions under command and was deployed on 11th Guards' left flank, directly north of the German-held village of Khvoshno, with the 235th to the east.

The offensive kicked off on December 13 following a two-hour artillery preparation on the 11th Guards Army's front. Only the 84th Guards Rifle Division of 36th Guards Rifle Corps was able to penetrate the first defensive positions on the first day, and it was soon halted by reserves of the 129th Infantry Division. Alarmed by this near-failure the Army commander, Lt. Gen. K. N. Galitskii, decided to shift the main attack into this sector. After regrouping overnight the 84th Guards completed the penetration after a further artillery preparation the next morning. Now tank and mechanized forces were committed into the breach, as well as the 16th and 83rd Guards Rifle Divisions to expand the gap and guard the flanks. With the German line unhinged the 83rd Corps was able to force its way past Khvoshno against resistance from the 6th Luftwaffe Field Division. By the end of December 15 the Army had nearly completed encircling the 129th and 211th Infantry Divisions in separate pockets. 3rd Panzer Army requested permission to take the front back but was refused as Hitler remained determined to close the "Nevel Gap". A day later the 211th was encircled and had no choice but to attempt a breakout, which occurred overnight on December 16/17 at the cost of 2,000 of its 7,000 troops and all of its artillery, heavy weapons and vehicles.

As the advance continued the 234th and 235th Divisions continued to pursue in a southeast direction, tying-in with the 43rd Army, before being re-directed to the southwest toward Gorodok, still driving elements of II Luftwaffe Corps ahead of them. By the end of December 21 the 234th was in the vicinity of Vakulenka, roughly 15km east of Gorodok. The town was liberated on December 24 following a night attack. Just before this took place Colonel Yatsun became ill, and would soon be hospitalized in Moscow. After he recovered he was transferred to the training establishment and never held another field command. He was replaced on December 23 by Col. Pavel Filippovich Kuklin who had earlier led the 44th Mountain Cavalry Division and the 40th Rifle Brigade.

=== Third Vitebsk Offensive ===
The victory at Gorodok was followed by an extensive regrouping in which 83rd Corps returned to 4th Shock Army while the 235th remained in 11th Guards Army, taking over the sector occupied by the 16th and 36th Guards Rifle Corps, allowing their divisions to shift to the west. The division was spread over a wide frontage with the 806th Rifle Regiment north and east of Losvida Lake east to Gorchikhina, the 732nd Regiment in and around Mosty, and the 801st Regiment in the Lugovaya area. Together they were facing remnants of the 129th Infantry and 3rd Luftwaffe Field Division. This latest effort to capture Vitebsk ran until January 5, by which time the division had been subordinated to 36th Guards Corps and brought in to back up the 16th Guards Division before the fighting tailed off in mutual exhaustion.

Prior to the renewal of the offensive on February 3 the commander of 1st Baltic Front, Army Gen. I. K. Bagramyan, activated the 103rd Rifle Corps and assigned the 11th Guards, 29th, and 235th Rifle Divisions to it. The Corps took over the sector from Losvida Lake southward to Mashkina at the northern extremity of the Vitebsk salient on 11th Guards Army's left wing. This permitted the Army to shift it 8th and 16th Guards Corps farther southwestward to the main attack sector south of Zaronovskoe Lake. The 235th remained on its previous sector north and east of Losvida Lake and saw little action before the offensive was halted on February 16. Before the end of the month the division was transferred to the 92nd Rifle Corps of 43rd Army. It would remain under this Army command almost continuously for the duration of the war.

=== Fourth Vitebsk Offensive ===
A renewed offensive was planned to begin on February 29 but before it could begin the commander of the 3rd Panzer Army, Col. Gen. G.-H. Reinhardt, disrupted the plan by shortening his defensive line around the city. The STAVKA took this as a preliminary to a full withdrawal from the Vitebsk salient, and ordered a pursuit. This led to a confused struggle on 43rd Army's sector north of Vitebsk. 92nd Corps launched probing attacks against 4th Luftwaffe Field Division's defenses in the vicinity of Losvida and Savchenki only to suffer a sharp rebuff. A further effort by the Corps' 334th Rifle Division struck the German 246th Infantry Division and forced it back to new defenses 2km west of Babinichi, but by the end of March 5 the "pursuit" had shot its bolt.

== Operation Bagration ==
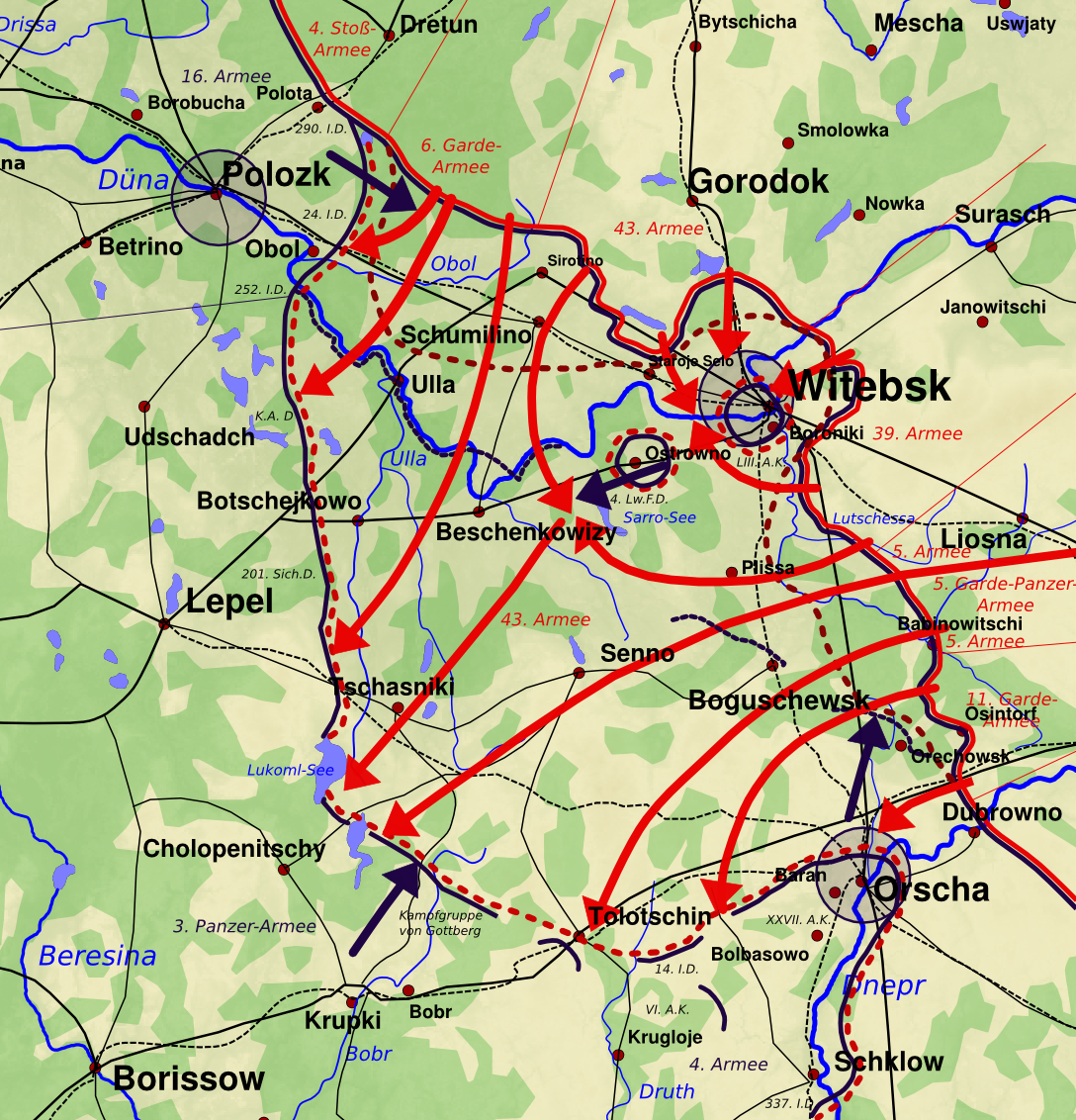
Vitebsk-Orsha Offensive. Note position of 43rd Army.

Colonel Kuklin left the division on April 6 and was placed at the disposal of the Military Council of 43rd Army; he would later serve as deputy commander of 306th Rifle Division. He was replaced the next day by Col. Ivan Lukich Lutskevich, who had previously led the 5th Fortified Region. This officer would be promoted to the rank of major general on September 13. During April the 235th was moved again, now to the 22nd Guards Rifle Corps, but before the start of the summer offensive it came under command of 60th Rifle Corps, along with the 334th Division.

At the start of the offensive on June 22, the Corps was part of the assault forces of 43rd Army. Following a very heavy artillery barrage and air attacks, 60th Corps passed through both the first and second German defense lines and reached the Obol River. By the evening of June 23, the two divisions were pressing remnants of German Corps Detachment 'D' south towards the Dvina River west of Vitebsk. On the following day several bridgeheads were taken and crossing operations began on both sides of Beshankovichy. Overnight on June 25/26 60th Corps met the 19th Guards Rifle Division of 39th Army at Gnezdilovichi, closing the ring, and through the day forces of both Armies cleared Vitebsk. On the same date the division was recognized for its role in liberating the city, towards which the Red Army had struggled for so many months, and was given that name as an honorific:

VITEBSK - ...235th Rifle Division (Colonel Lutskevich, Ivan Lukich)... The troops who participated in the liberation of Vitebsk, by the order of the Supreme High Command of 26 June 1944 and a commendation in Moscow, are given a salute of 20 artillery salvoes from 224 guns.

=== Baltic Offensives ===
Following this victory the division joined in the pursuit of the broken remnants of Army Group Center, and by the second week in July had nearly reached the Lithuanian border just east of Švenčionys. Over the following months the advance slowed, and by August 1 the division found itself in the vicinity of Kupiškis, moving in the direction of Riga. By this time it had returned to 92nd Corps. Two weeks later, as 3rd Panzer Army launched Operation Doppelkopf, the 235th had taken up positions at Bauska, Latvia, holding along the Lielupe River. It remained in this area into mid-September when the Riga Offensive began. By October 5 it had relocated to the area around Radviliškis, Lithuania, in preparation for the Memel Offensive. In recognition of its successes in the battles southeast of Riga the division was awarded the Order of the Red Banner on October 22.

== Into East Prussia ==
The STAVKA issued orders on December 6 to General Bagramyan that he was to concentrate 4-5 rifle divisions on the left flank of 43rd Army by December 28 in order to assist 3rd Belorussian Front in defeating the German group of forces in and around Tilsit and rolling up the defense along the Neman River at the outset of the upcoming offensive into East Prussia. Before the start of this operation on January 13, 1945, some of these divisions, including the 235th, were incorporated into the 54th Rifle Corps; it would remain under this command for the duration. In the first days the Corps forced a crossing of the Neman and then advanced along the south bank, breaking into Tilsit during the latter half of January 19 and capturing it after a short battle. In recognition, the part of the 235th involved was awarded a battle honor:

TILSIT - ...801st Rifle Regiment (Lt. Colonel Khokhlov, Anatoli Mikhailovich)... The troops who participated in the capture of Tilsit and other cities, by the order of the Supreme High Command of 20 January 1945 and a commendation in Moscow, are given a salute of 20 artillery salvoes from 224 guns.

Immediately after this the 43rd Army as a whole was transferred to 3rd Belorussian Front.

The Front now began a pursuit of the defeated German IX Army Corps with its right wing Armies; the German remnants were attempting to retreat behind the Alle and Deime Rivers. By the end of January 22 the 43rd Army had made a fighting advance of 23km and the 54th Corps' main force had reached Kelladen while other elements of the Army were on the east shore of the Kurisches Haff. The German forces were hurriedly fortifying the approaches to Labiau and were trying to organize a defense along the east bank of the Deime, which was the last line of defense before Königsberg.

Combat operations continued overnight on January 22/23. At dawn the 43rd Army attacked Labiau following a short artillery preparation. The defenders, employing heavy machine gun and mortar fire, initially stopped the 103rd Corps' units at the river, but eventually its 115th Rifle Division and 54th Corps' 263rd Rifle Division forced a crossing and outflanked the town from north and south, while the 319th Rifle Division broke in from the east. Labiau, with most of its garrison, was in Soviet hands by the end of the day and the Army was directed to continue its advance to the west. By the end of January 26 it had reached a line from Postnikken to Zelweten. From here it developed its attack along the seacoast, pursuing the remnants of two German infantry divisions and reaching the line Stombeck–Norgenen while 54th Corps repelled four counterattacks by tanks and infantry. With Königsberg cut off the Front now focused on eliminating the German forces southwest of the city in the Preußisch Eylau–Landsberg–Bartenstein area, but this did not directly involve the 43rd Army. During February the 54th Corps was transferred to 39th Army, which became part of the Zemland Group of Forces effective February 24. On February 19 the 235th was awarded the Order of Suvorov, 2nd Degree, and the 682nd Artillery Regiment was given the Order of the Red Banner, both for their roles in the crossing of the Deime and the capture of Labiau, while the 806th Rifle Regiment received the Order of Suvorov, 3rd Degree, for its part in the battle for Tilsit.

=== Battles for Königsberg and Samland ===
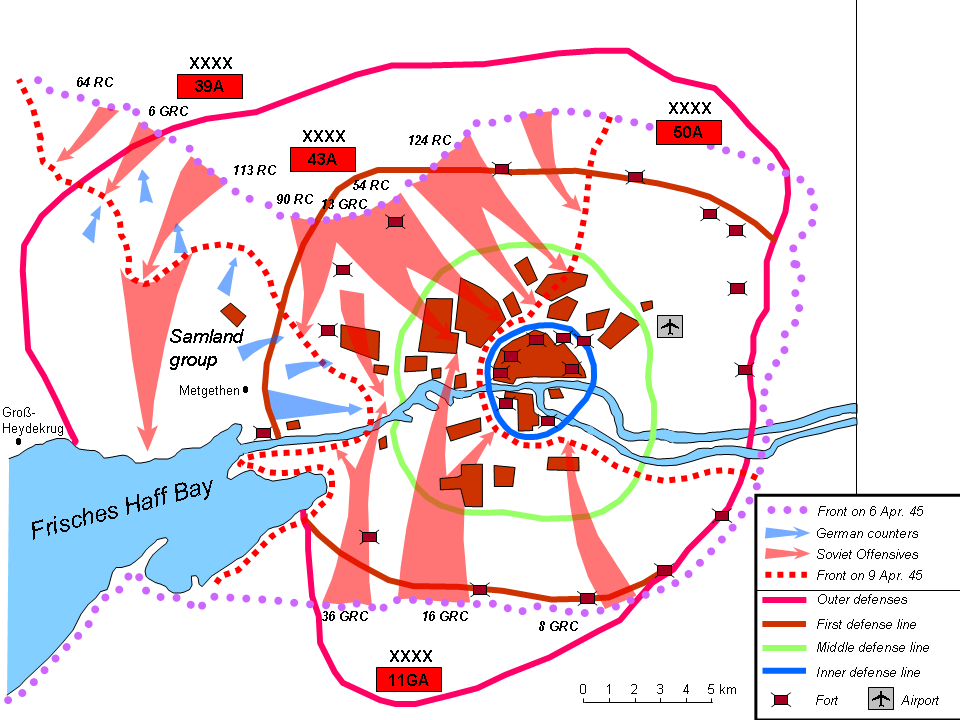
Battle Of Königsberg. Note positions of 43rd Army.

By the beginning of April the 54th Corps had returned to 43rd Army, which was also part of the Zemland Group. This Group was disbanded on April 3 and the Army reverted to direct command of 3rd Belorussian Front. The Army was deployed northwest of Königsberg on an attack frontage about 3km wide from Katzenblick to Amalienhof with 54th Corps on the left flank. It faced elements of the 561st Infantry Division. Following four days of fire reconnaissance and destruction of fixed defenses by artillery and aviation, the assault began with an artillery preparation at 1030 hours on April 6; the infantry and armor began moving forward at noon. During the day the Army advanced 3km and cleared 20 city blocks. As the weather cleared the next day the Red Air Forces intensified its bombardment and the infantry was reinforced with artillery firing over open sights. 43rd Army captured one permanent fort and seized another 20 blocks. The advance continued on April 8 and in the afternoon 43rd Army linked up with 11th Guards Army in the Amalienau area while 54th Corps assisted units of 50th Army in capturing the Palfe area. Near the end of the next day the German garrison capitulated. In recognition of this victory three subunits of the 235th were awarded honorifics:

KÖNIGSBERG - ...732nd Rifle Regiment (Lt. Colonel Samoilov, Ivan Tikhonovich) ...806th Rifle Regiment (Colonel Zapashnev, Pavel Ilich) ...682nd Artillery Regiment (Lt. Colonel Klepikov, Fyodor Filippovich) ...The troops who participated in the capture of the city and fortress of Königsberg, by the order of the Supreme High Command of 9 April 1945 and a commendation in Moscow, are given a salute of 24 artillery salvoes from 324 guns.

Following this victory the 43rd Army was given a role in clearing the German forces from the Sambia Peninsula. It was assigned an attack frontage of 7-8km and was to advance in the direction of Nepleken. The operation began at 0800 hours on April 13 following a one-hour artillery preparation and on the first day the Army gained 5km and took 1,500 prisoners. The next day it advanced along the north shore of the Frisches Haff, and took the strongpoint of Großheidekrug. On April 17 it captured the town of Fischhausen in cooperation with 39th Army and the peninsula was effectively cleared. Shortly after the 43rd was transferred to 2nd Belorussian Front and ended the war under that command. General Lutskevich left the division of April 22 in order to attend the Voroshilov Academy and was replaced by Col. Viktor Ivanovich Rutko, who had previously led the 352nd Rifle Division.

== Postwar ==
When the fighting ended the men and women of the division shared the full title of 235th Rifle, Vitebsk, Order of the Red Banner, Order of Suvorov Division. (Russian: 235-я стрелковая Витебская Краснознаменная ордена Суворова дивизия.) On May 17 the 801st Rifle Regiment was awarded the Order of Suvorov, 3rd Degree, while the 217th Antitank Battalion received the Order of Alexander Nevsky, both for their roles in the battle for Königsberg.

In accordance with STAVKA Order No. 11097 May 29 the division, along with its Corps and Army, was transferred to the Northern Group of Forces. On July 25 Maj. Gen. Mikhail Fyodorovich Borisov took over command and would lead the division until its disbandment; he had previously led the 336th Rifle Division. In July 1946 the division was disbanded, one month ahead of the disbandment of 43rd Army as a whole.
