= Andrey Chekharin =

Soviet military colonel (1892–1941)

Andrey Yevseyevich Chekharin
- Chekharin, c. 1940
- Born: 26 October 1892; Gubino, Kaluga Governorate, Russian Empire
- Died: 20 October 1941 (aged 48) Near Yasnaya Polyana, Tula Oblast, Soviet Union
- Allegiance: Russian Empire; Russian SFSR; Soviet Union
- Branch: Imperial Russian Army; Red Army
- Service years: 1915–1918; 1918–1941
- Rank: Colonel
- Commands: 37th Rifle Division; 269th Rifle Division
- Conflicts: World War I; Russian Civil War; World War II
- Awards: Order of the Patriotic War, 1st class; Order of the Red Star

Andrey Yevseyevich Chekharin (Russian: Андре́й Евсе́евич Чеха́рин; 26 October 1892 – 20 October 1941) was a Red Army colonel killed in World War II.

Chekharin ended World War I as a junior officer, but did not see much action in the Russian Civil War. He served at military educational institutions and in territorial units during the 1920s and 1930s, holding staff positions during the late 1930s. Chekharin commanded the 37th Rifle Division, destroyed in the Battle of Białystok–Minsk, and then the 269th Rifle Division during Operation Typhoon. He was killed while attempting to break out of encirclement during the latter.

== Early life, World War I, and Russian Civil War ==
Chekharin was born in the village of Gubino, Kaluga Governorate on 26 October 1892. He served in the Imperial Russian Army from January 1915 as a ryadovoy (private) of the training command of the 641st Don Foot Druzhina in Belaya Tserkov. He was later promoted to yefreytor (corporal) and to junior and senior unter-ofitser (non-commissioned officer). In June 1916 he became a junker of the 1st School of Praporshchiks of the Southwestern Front in Zhitomir, and after graduating from it in December became a junior officer and company commander in the 47th Reserve Infantry Regiment of the front.

Chekharin completed the three-month advanced courses for praporshchiks under the 35th Reserve Brigade of the front at Chertkov in 1917, then served as a junior officer and company commander with the 161st Alexandropol Infantry Regiment of the 41st Infantry Division. Between January and March 1918 he served as a junior officer with a company of the 256th Infantry Regiment of the Moscow Military District in Bryansk.

After he was demobilized from the army, Chekharin returned to Gubino, where he became chairman of the volost executive committee in March during the Russian Civil War. He was conscripted into the Red Army in June and appointed commissar of the volost military commissariat. Serving as a platoon and company commander with the 18th Kaluga Command Courses and the 29th Reserve Rifle Regiment from December 1918, he became temporary chief of the courses and commander of the consolidated cadet brigade drawn from them in June 1921 to participate in the suppression of the Tambov Rebellion.

== Interwar period ==
Demobilized in February 1923 to graduate from the Kaluga Pedagogical Institute, Chekharin was reconscripted into the army in December and sent to serve in the 241st Rifle Regiment of the 81st Rifle Division at Kaluga, becoming a company commander, chief of the regimental school, and assistant battalion commander. From November 1926 he served as chief of the regimental school of the 2nd Vyatka Territorial Rifle Regiment, and headed the military department of the Vyatka Pedagogical Institute. Chekharin studied at the Leningrad Higher Military Political School from March 1929 and following his graduation in October remained at the school as a tactics teacher.

Appointed chief of staff of the 167th Rifle Regiment of the 56th Rifle Division of the Leningrad Military District at Pskov in December 1931, Chekharin temporarily commanded the regiment for three months. He transferred to the Leningrad Night Training Center in March 1933, serving successively as an instructor-leader and tactics teacher, acting chief of the center, and chief of training. Appointed chief of training of the Leningrad Improvement Courses for Reserve Command Personnel in April 1937, he became chief of the Combat Training Directorate of the OSOAVIAKHIM Central Council in February 1939.

After completing the Vystrel course in 1939, Chekharin, promoted to colonel, served as assistant chief of infantry of the 15th Army of the Northwestern Front in March and April 1940, then was chief of the 2nd staff department of the Arkhangelsk Military District. In July 1940 he became deputy commander of the 37th Rifle Division of the 21st Rifle Corps of the Western Special Military District, stationed in Belarus. He succeeded to command the division in March 1941, being awarded the Order of the Red Star in the same month.

== World War II ==
After Operation Barbarossa began, Chekharin led the division in the Battle of Białystok–Minsk as part of the Western Front. His unit was placed under the direct control of the front commander and entered battle on 24 June in the area of Lida. From late June, with the 21st Corps, the division fought in defense of the Minsk Fortified Region, and conducted a fighting retreat towards Borisov and eventually to the Dnieper, being virtually destroyed in the fighting. In early September Chekharin was appointed commander of the newly formed 269th Rifle Division, which joined the 3rd Army of the Bryansk Front. From 30 September the division fought against Operation Typhoon, the German drive on Moscow. In these operations it was defeated and encircled. In more than two weeks of fighting, lacking ammunition and fuel, the division fought to break out towards Tula. On 20 October the division and the 3rd Army headquarters had nearly reached Soviet lines, but Chekharin was reported missing, presumed killed, in a breakout attempt near Yasnaya Polyana.

He was posthumously awarded the Order of the Patriotic War, 1st class, in 1965 in commemoration of the 20th anniversary of the end of the war.
