= 234th Rifle Division =

234th Rifle Division (October 15, 1941 - June 13, 1945)
- Active: 1941–1945
- Country: Soviet Union
- Branch: Red Army
- Type: Infantry
- Size: Division
- Engagements: Battle of Moscow; Battles of Rzhev; Operation Büffel; Battle of Smolensk (1943); Battle of Nevel (1943); Operation Bagration; Lublin–Brest offensive Vistula–Oder offensive Operation Solstice; West Pomeranian offensive Battle of Berlin
- Decorations: Order of Suvorov; Order of Bogdan Khmelnitsky
- Battle honours: Lomonosovo; Praga

Commanders
- Notable commanders: Col. Fyodor Antonovich Laminskii; Col. Stepan Ilich Turyev; Col. Afanasii Ivanovich Seliukov

The 234th Rifle Division was an infantry division of the Red Army, originally formed out-of-sequence in the Moscow Military District in October–November 1941. Due to having a large cadre of members of the Communist Party it was commonly referred to as the Yaroslavl Communist Division. After forming and briefly taking part in the rear defenses of Moscow in early 1942 it was assigned to 4th Shock Army in Kalinin Front. It became involved in the fighting near Velizh and remained in that region until nearly the end of the year. In March 1943 the division played a minor role in the follow-up to Army Group Center's evacuation of the Rzhev salient, and at the beginning of August liberated several strategic villages northeast of Smolensk, soon being rewarded with a battle honor. During the following autumn and winter it took part in the grinding battles around Vitebsk until it was removed to the Reserve of the Supreme High Command for rebuilding and reorganization. When it returned to the front it was assigned to 47th Army in 1st Belorussian Front and took part in the later stages of Operation Bagration, advancing to the Vistula River near Warsaw. In September it received a second honorific for its part in the liberation of Praga. The 234th fought across Poland and into Pomerania early in 1945, winning two decorations in the process before being transferred to the 61st Army for the final offensive into northeast Germany. It was disbanded shortly thereafter.

== Formation ==
The division began forming in accordance with GKO Decree No. 804, issued on October 15, 1941, in the Moscow Military District. It was headquartered at Pesochnoye in the Yaroslavl Oblast. Its first commander, Col. Fyodor Antonovich Laminskii, was officially appointed on November 2 although he had been instrumental in forming the division from the start, along with his deputy, Commissar M. P. Smirnov. Once formed, its official order of battle, based on a version of the shtat (table of organization and equipment) of July 29, 1941, was as follows:

- 1340th Rifle Regiment
- 1342nd Rifle Regiment
- 1350th Rifle Regiment
- 1081st Artillery Regiment (later 1298th)
- 245th Antitank Battalion
- 98th Reconnaissance Company (later 225th)
- 641st Sapper Battalion (later 691st)
- 979th Signal Battalion (later 596th Signal Company)
- 145th Medical/Sanitation Battalion (later 549th)
- 136th Chemical Defense (Anti-gas) Company (later 499th)
- 618th Motor Transport Company
- 409th Field Bakery (later 499th)
- 56th Divisional Veterinary Hospital (later 880th)
- 1721st Field Postal Station
- 1055th Field Office of the State Bank

The All-Union Communist Party (Bolsheviks) Committee of Yaroslavl Oblast had petitioned the GKO for permission to form the division, and it was subsequently commonly referred to as the Yaroslavl People's Militia Division or the Yaroslavl Communist Division. Once formed it had 11,648 personnel on strength, including 4,500 Communist Party members and Komsomols. In common with many militia divisions the rifle regiments were given honorifics based on where they were raised: thus the 1340th Yaroslavl; the 1342nd Rybinsk; and the 1350th Kostroma. Colonel Laminskii had led a rifle regiment during the Winter War and was given command of the newly-formed 226th Rifle Division in March 1941, but was hospitalized due to illness from June 24 to July 20, and then again due to shell-shock in early October, before taking command of the 234th. By the beginning of December the division was officially under command of the Moscow Military District, but on January 4, 1942, it became part of the active army as part of the Moscow Defence Zone. This force was considered the "last ditch" defense of the capital, but by now the Soviet counteroffensive was well underway. On February 10 the division began moving north through the snow to join the 4th Shock Army of Kalinin Front at Toropets, which had been liberated on January 21.

== Battles of Rzhev ==
In carving out the salient around Toropets the 4th and 3rd Shock Armies had created the western face of the Rzhev salient, which contained the German 9th Army. 4th Shock's advance had been halted just after surrounding the town of Velizh, and this was where the 234th concentrated after arriving in the region. After attacking in the Prechistoye area in an effort to defeat the German garrison the division went over to the defense on March 16 as other German forces attempted to break the siege. A veteran of the division, E. P. Tarasov, recalled:

The enemy attacked incessantly. Enemy aviation literally didn't allow us to raise our heads. At the beginning of April, there were days when hundreds of individual combat sorties were conducted against our positions. They especially savagely bombed us between 3 and 5 April. When you try to picture the end of March - beginning of April 1942 in your mind, the many days merge into one, and this entire endless day drags on with exceedingly hard combat. Almost every day, there was a carousel of German dive bombers overhead. Having formed into a circle, they in turn would go into a dive, turn on their sirens, and bomb and strafe us. It is impossible to forget the dense mortar fire that the enemy mortar crews rained down on upon us, not forgetting the shells, and the heavy, unceasing fatigue from the constant lack of sleep and nervous stress.

The German garrison was relieved on April 5 by elements of the 7th Panzer Division after the 234th was pushed back up to 3 km on the Verdino–Klestovo sector and up to 5 km along the highway in the Litvinovo–Amshara sector. On April 14 Colonel Laminskii was heavily wounded in both legs when he stepped on a Soviet mine. He was hospitalized until December and then served out the war in the training establishment. He was replaced the next day by Lt. Col. Stepan Ilich Turyev; this officer would be promoted to the rank of colonel on May 14. The division had regrouped by April 16 but as of May 3 it was defending a sector as much as 63 km in width which remained largely inactive into the new year. At this time it was in the Front reserves, but by the beginning of June it had been assigned to 41st Army, still in Kalinin Front. It spent nearly the rest of the year under these commands.

The division was reassigned to 43rd Army, still in Kalinin Front, in mid-December. By this time Operation Mars, the latest effort to defeat 9th Army in the Rzhev salient, was close to culminating, but the division had played no direct role in it. It was still in 43rd Army near the base of the salient at the start of March 1943 when 9th Army began its evacuation, Operation Büffel. 43rd Army took part in the late stages of the pursuit before running up against the prepared positions at the base of the former salient at the end of the month. At about the same time the 234th was again reassigned, now to the Front's 39th Army.

== Into Western Russia ==
The division remained in much the same positions during the operational pause in the spring and early summer of the year. As of July 30 it reported its losses since arriving at the fighting front: 3,544 killed; 5,585 wounded; 906 missing and 33 captured. Prior to the start of the Soviet summer offensive on this sector the Army organized a small-scale operation by part of the division on August 1 which liberated several villages near the front line and soon earned it a unique battle honor:

LOMONOSOVO – ... part of the forces of 234th Rifle Division (Colonel Turyev, Stepan Ilich)... The troops that broke through the enemy’s heavily fortified zone and defeated his long-held strongholds of Lomonosovo and others, by order of the Supreme Commander-in-Chief of 19 September 1943 and a commendation in Moscow, are given a salute of 12 artillery salvoes by 124 guns.

As of September 1 the division had joined the 84th Rifle Corps in 39th Army, but ten days later it returned to 4th Shock Army, now as part of 83rd Rifle Corps.

=== Battle of Nevel ===
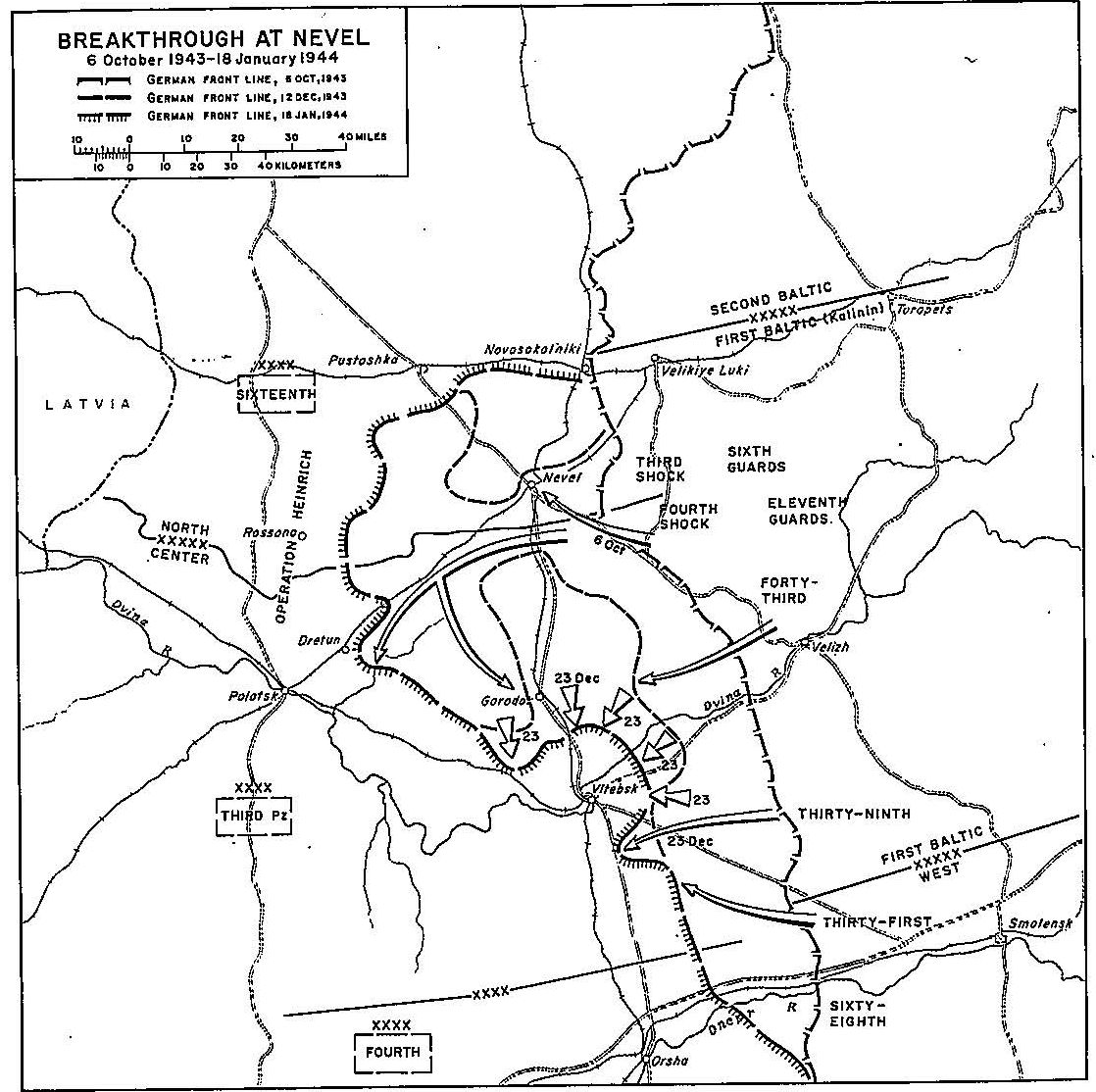
The Nevel Salient, October 6, 1943, to January 18, 1944

As the Kalinin and Western Fronts battled into western Russia the STAVKA issued orders to the commander of the former, Army Gen. A. I. Yeryomenko, on September 19 to prepare a new operation to finally take Velizh, which was done the next day. Following this success the High Command set its sights on Vitebsk. Yeryomenko wrote on September 22 that he would "make the main attack with the 4th Shock, 43rd, and 39th Armies in the general direction of Vitebsk. To that end I will reinforce 4th Shock Army with four rifle divisions (the 234th, 235th, 117th, and 16th Lithuanian Rifle Divisions)..." Days later he began planning a supporting operation by 3rd Shock Army toward Nevel, which was an important railroad and road center and a large supply base; its liberation would go some way toward outflanking Vitebsk from the north.

The offensive began at 0500 hours on October 6 with a reconnaissance-in-force, followed by a 90-minute artillery preparation at 0840 hours and airstrikes by 21st Assault Aviation Regiment. 3rd Shock went over to the attack at 1000 hours on the Zhigary-Shliapy sector, precisely at the boundary between Army Groups North and Center. 28th Rifle Division spearheaded the assault in the first echelon followed closely by an exploitation echelon consisting of the 21st Guards Rifle Division and the 78th Tank Brigade with 54 tanks. The assaulting force struck and demolished the 2nd Luftwaffe Field Division. Nevel itself was taken by a flying column by the end of the day. Meanwhile, 4th Shock launched its attack toward Gorodok. The Army commander, Maj. Gen. V. I. Shvetsov, had formed a shock group from two of his rifle corps, each advancing abreast in three echelons. 2nd Guards Rifle Corps led with its 360th Rifle Division, followed by 117th and 16th Lithuanian Divisions and two tank brigades. 83rd Corps had its 47th Rifle Division up, supported by 234th, 235th and 381st Rifle Divisions and another two tank brigades. Although there were no further panicked withdrawals by units of II Luftwaffe Field Corps the attack gained about 20 km but ultimately faltered just short of the Nevel-Gorodok-Vitebsk railroad and highway.

Despite this initial success, for reasons that remain uncertain Yeryomenko reined in his advancing forces on October 9 and by the next day German reserves had managed to cordon off the huge salient, which thwarted any immediate push toward Vitebsk. After mid-month 4th Shock conducted nearly constant operations either to improve its positions or defend against German counterattacks. A more determined effort began on October 17 when 83rd Corps and 2nd Guards Corps struck the 129th Infantry Division and the flank and rear of II Luftwaffe Corps, threatening to collapse the defenses north of Vitebsk. In response the 20th Panzer Division, although it had fewer than 20 tanks on strength, was ordered to counterattack and managed to contain the advance after two days of heavy fighting. Nevertheless, the Luftwaffe troops were forced to withdraw to new defensive positions. On October 20 Kalinin Front was redesignated as 1st Baltic Front; at about this time Yeryomenko reported that his rifle divisions had been reduced to from 3,500 - 4,500 personnel each.

=== Polotsk-Vitebsk Offensive ===
In an early morning fog on November 2 the 3rd and 4th Shock Armies penetrated the defenses of the left flank of 3rd Panzer Army southwest of Nevel. After the breakthrough, which opened a 16 km-wide gap, 3rd Shock turned to the north behind the flank of 16th Army while 4th Shock moved southwest behind 3rd Panzer Army. While 4th Shock's 60th Rifle Corps formed the shock group for this attack the 83rd Corps launched local attacks and protected the 60th's left flank. At the same time the Front's 43rd and 39th Armies were also attacking eastward along the Smolensk–Vitebsk road. Due to increasing German resistance and deteriorating weather the Soviet advance was brought to a temporary halt on November 11. The STAVKA ordered a regrouping which resulted in 83rd Corps moving to 43rd Army on November 14 with the objective of cutting the rail line between Zhukovo and Ezerishche. In another regrouping later in the month the Corps went to 11th Guards Army, still in 1st Baltic Front.

=== Gorodok Offensive ===
By this time forces of 3rd Panzer Army were still clinging to a deep salient running north from Gorodok to not far south of Nevel, deeply flanked by 4th Shock to the west and the remainder of 1st Baltic Front to the east. For the new operation the 11th Guards and 4th Shock Armies, with tank and cavalry support, "were to penetrate the enemy's defenses on the flanks of the Gorodok salient, encircle and destroy his grouping by concentric attacks in the direction of Bychikha Station, and then capture Gorodok and Vitebsk while developing the attack to the south." The 43rd and 39th Armies would support the attack. At this time 83rd Corps had only the 234th and 235th Divisions under command and was deployed on 11th Guards' left flank, directly north of the German-held village of Khvoshno, with the 234th to the west.

The offensive kicked off on December 13 following a two-hour artillery preparation on the 11th Guards Army's front. Only the 84th Guards Rifle Division of 36th Guards Rifle Corps was able to penetrate the first defensive positions on the first day, and it was soon halted by reserves of the 129th Infantry Division. Alarmed by this near-failure the Army commander, Lt. Gen. K. N. Galitskii, decided to shift the main attack into this sector. After regrouping overnight the 84th Guards completed the penetration after a further artillery preparation the next morning. Now tank and mechanized forces were committed into the breach, as well as the 16th and 83rd Guards Rifle Divisions to expand the gap and guard the flanks. With the German line unhinged the 83rd Corps was able to force its way past Khvoshno against resistance from the 6th Luftwaffe Field Division. By the end of December 15 the Army had nearly completed encircling the 129th and 211th Infantry Divisions in separate pockets. 3rd Panzer Army requested permission to take the front back but was refused as Hitler remained determined to close the "Nevel Gap". A day later the 211th was encircled and had no choice but to attempt a breakout, which occurred overnight on December 16/17 at the cost of 2,000 of its 7,000 troops and all of its artillery, heavy weapons and vehicles.

As the advance continued the 234th and 235th Divisions continued to pursue in a southeast direction, tying-in with the 43rd Army, before being re-directed to the southwest toward Gorodok, still driving elements of II Luftwaffe Corps ahead of them. By the end of December 21 the 234th was in the vicinity of Blinki, roughly 12 km east of Gorodok. The town was liberated on December 24 following a night attack. This was followed by an extensive regrouping in which 83rd Corps (now consisting of the 234th, 117th and 360th Rifle Divisions) returned to 4th Shock Army by the beginning of January 1944.

== Into Belarus ==
In preparation for a renewed offensive on Vitebsk the 83rd and 2nd Guards Corps were concentrated on 4th Shock's left wing, deployed along the Sirotino–Gorodok road between Ostrovliane and Mylnishche. The STAVKA directed that the city should be taken no later than January 1. When the attack began on December 24 the two Corps smashed their way through the German defenses at the junction between the 6th Luftwaffe and 252nd Infantry Divisions, spearheaded by at least two brigades of the 5th Tank Corps, and gained up to 4 km. 3rd Panzer Army was forced to order its LIII and VI Army Corps to withdraw to a new line closer to Vitebsk's outer defenses, which took place overnight on December 24/25. by the next day the 234th had reached the vicinity of Petraki. Two days later it became involved in a complex battle for the German strongpoint at Gorbachi on the Vitebsk–Polotsk railway, but this was unsuccessful. By January 5 the fighting had tailed off due to mutual exhaustion.

=== Vitebsk-Bogushevsk Offensive ===
When the offensive was renewed the next day the 83rd and 2nd Guards Corps were again designated for 4th Shock's main attack. 83rd Corps, which was now to the right of 2nd Guards, had the 234th and 360th Divisions in first echelon backed by the 117th and was to strike the defenses of the 5th Jäger Division in the sector from Gorbachi westward to Mazurino. The Corps was also reinforced with the 47th Rifle Division from the Front reserves. By this time all the rifle divisions were considerably understrength, with 4,500-5,000 personnel each. The assault began with a short but intense artillery preparation but almost immediately encountered determined resistance. The 234th was located north of the salient around Novoselki and made negligible progress before the offensive was again suspended on January 14. It remained in the same area until the end of the month. On February 3 the division was withdrawn into the Reserve of the Supreme High Command for much needed rebuilding and reorganization. By March 1 it had been assigned to the 103rd Rifle Corps of 21st Army within the Reserve, before leaving it on March 18. When it returned to the front it came under the command of the 77th Rifle Corps of 47th Army in 2nd Belorussian Front.

=== Operation Bagration ===
In the buildup to the summer offensive against Army Group Center the 47th Army continued redeploying, moving to 1st Belorussian Front in April. At the start of the offensive on June 22/23 the 77th Corps contained the 132nd, 143rd, 185th and 234th Divisions and 47th Army was one of five Armies on the western flank of the Front, south of the Pripyat Marshes in the area of Kovel, and so played no role in the initial stages of the offensive.

The west wing Armies joined the offensive at 0530 hours on July 18, following a 30-minute artillery preparation. By this time the 234th had been reassigned to the 125th Rifle Corps, still in 47th Army. The Corps had sent one rifle battalion as a forward detachment and this helped to confirm that the German forces had already begun to fall back on their next defensive line. A further preparation was therefore changed to a rolling barrage to support the infantry advance. The main defensive zone, and part of the second, was broken through on the end of the day. The next day the 47th Army gained as much as 25 km through the difficult marsh terrain. On July 20 the 2nd Guards Cavalry Corps entered the breach created by 47th Army and reached the Western Bug River by 1030 hours, forcing a crossing as early as 1600. By the end of the day the Army was fighting along a line from Zalesie to Grabowo to Zabuzhye.

=== Lublin–Brest Offensive ===
On July 21 Stalin ordered 1st Belorussian Front to capture Lublin no later than July 26–27. 47th Army was to launch a secondary drive toward Siedlce along the axis of Włodawa–Czukow–Mosty. By the end of July 23 the Front's forces had completely broken through the last defensive line along the Western Bug before Warsaw; 47th Army had advanced up to 52 km and in the process formed an external encirclement of the German forces at Brest, in conjunction with 65th Army. On July 25 the Army's right flank and center took Biała Podlaska Station and the next day the town itself along with Mendzizec. Meanwhile, the left flank reached a line from Wielgolas to Wilchta to Goździk, engaging elements of Corps Detachment "E", 5th Jäger and 211th Infantry Divisions along with recently arrived reinforcements. As resistance grew the pace of the advance fell to 2–12 km per day. Brest was taken on July 29 and the Front's forces closed up to the Vistula and Warsaw, seizing a pair of bridgeheads over the river before the advance ground to a halt in the first days of August. 2nd Tank Army attempted to capture the fortified Warsaw suburb of Praga but a powerful counterblow by five panzer and one infantry divisions struck the boundary between that Army and the 47th brought both over-stretched Armies to a halt. Praga was not finally taken until more than a month later, at which time the division was awarded its second honorific:

PRAGA – ... 234th Rifle Division (Colonel Turyev, Stepan Ilich)... The troops that participated in the battles for the liberation of the Praga fortress, by order of the Supreme Commander-in-Chief of 14 September 1944 and a commendation in Moscow, are given a salute of 20 artillery salvoes by 224 guns.

== Into Poland and Germany ==
On December 18 Colonel Turyev left the division and was soon sent to study at the Voroshilov Academy, where he would remain until after the German surrender. In August he was given command of the 341st Rifle Division but was moved to the reserve in April 1947 due to illness. He was instrumental in forming a museum to the 234th in Yaroslavl and died in 1986. He was replaced in command the next day by Col. Afanasii Ivanovich Seliukov, who would lead the division until it was disbanded. This officer had previously served as deputy commander of the 260th Rifle Division.

At the outset of the Vistula-Oder Offensive the division was back in 77th Corps of 47th Army in 1st Belorussian Front. The Front was ordered to launch a supporting attack north of Warsaw with the 47th along a 4 km-wide front for the purpose of clearing the German forces between the Vistula and Western Bug, in conjunction with the left wing of 2nd Belorussian Front. Following this the Army was to outflank Warsaw from the northeast and help capture the city in cooperation with the 1st Polish Army and part of 61st and 2nd Guards Tank Armies.

The main offensive began on January 12 but 47th Army did not begin its attack until January 15, with a 55-minute artillery preparation. By day's end it had cleared the inter-river area east of Modlin. Overnight the Army's 129th Rifle Corps forced a crossing of the frozen Vistula. On January 17 the 1st Polish Army began the fight for Warsaw and, threatened with encirclement, the German forces abandoned it. For its part in the victory one regiment of the 234th received a battle honor:

WARSAW – ... 1298th Artillery Regiment (Major Negrutsev, Tikhon Ivanovich)... The troops that participated in the battles for the liberation of Warsaw, by order of the Supreme Commander-in-Chief of 17 January 1945, and a commendation in Moscow, are given a salute of 24 artillery salvoes by 324 guns.

Following this success the STAVKA ordered an all-out advance to the Oder River. 47th Army reached the Bzura by 1800 hours on January 18. As the Front's right flank lengthened to 110–120 km by January 25 the 47th, 1st Polish, and 3rd Shock Armies were brought up to guard against any counteroffensive from German forces in East Pomerania. By the end of the next day elements of the Army captured Bydgoszcz and Nakło nad Notecią.

Over the following weeks the Front's right wing forces eliminated the German garrisons blockaded in Schneidemühl, Deutsch Krone, and Arnswalde, but otherwise gained only up to 10 km of ground. The German 11th Army launched a hastily planned counteroffensive at Stargard on February 15 and two days later the 47th Army was forced to abandon the towns of Piritz and Bahn and fall back 8–12 km. Despite this minor setback, the 234th would be awarded the Order of Bogdan Khmelnitsky, 2nd Degree, on April 5 for its part in taking Deutsch Krone. As part of the regrouping that followed this unexpected blow the division was reassigned to 89th Rifle Corps of 61st Army, still in 1st Belorussian Front. It would remain in this Army for the rest of its existence.

=== Berlin Operation ===
In the buildup to the offensive on Berlin in April the 61st Army was deployed on the east bank of the Oder from Nipperwiese to Alt Rudnitz. By this time the 234th had been reassigned to 80th Rifle Corps. The Army was to launch its main attack with its left flank, forcing the river along a 2.5 km sector from Hohenwutzow to Neuglitzen. This Corps was deployed on the right flank. Within its Corps, the division was in the first echelon while the 212th Rifle Division in second echelon. Although the main offensive began on April 16, 61st Army did not attack until the next day, when it won a bridgehead 3 km wide and up to 1,000m deep. By the 22nd the Army had cleared the Oder and Alte Oder and had turned its front completely to the north; three days later it had reached points 55 km west of the Oder. On April 29 it forced the Havel River in the area of Zehdenick against minimal resistance. Finally, on May 2, having advanced 60 km during the day against no resistance, it reached the Elbe River in the area of Havelberg, and the next day met up with elements of the U.S. 84th Infantry Division near Gnefsdorf.

For its actions in the recapture of Stargard, Naugard, and Polzin the division received its final decoration, the Order of Suvorov, 2nd Degree, on April 26. On the same date the 1298th Artillery Regiment was awarded the Order of the Red Banner for its part in the same fighting.

== Postwar ==
When the fighting stopped the men and women of the division shared the full title of 234th Rifle, Lomonosovo-Praga, Order of Suvorov and Order of Bogdan Khmelnitsky Division. (Russian: 234-я стрелковая Ломоносовско-Пражская орденов Суворова и Богдана Хмельницкого дивизия.) On May 3 the 1340th Rifle Regiment was given the Order of Alexander Nevsky for its part in the capture of Altdamm. According to STAVKA Order No. 11095 of May 29, 1945, parts 5 and 6, the 234th is listed as one of the rifle divisions to be transferred to the Group of Soviet Forces in Germany by June 3 but also to be "disbanded in place" shortly thereafter. The division was disbanded later that month.
