= 21st Rifle Corps =

- Allegiance: Soviet Union
- Branch: Soviet Red Army
- Engagements: Eastern Front (World War II); Operation Barbarossa

The 21st Rifle Corps was a corps of the Soviet Red Army. It was part of the Western Front. It took part in the Great Patriotic War.

The headquarters formed in the Moscow Military District in September 1939. Assigned to the WSMD with the 17th, 24th, and 37th Rifle Divisions. The commander was Major General Vladimir Borisovich Borisov.

The corps was disbanded in summer 1945.
