= 37th Rifle Division =

- Active: 1918–1920, 1922–1941, 1941–1946, 1955–1957
- Country: Soviet Union
- Type: Infantry
- Size: Division
- Engagements: Winter War World War II: Operation Barbarossa; Finnish conquest of East Karelia (1941); Leningrad-Novgorod Offensive; Baltic Offensive; Riga Offensive (1944); Courland Pocket
- Decorations: Order of the Red Banner (2nd formation)
- Battle honours: Novocherkassk (2nd formation); Named for Comrade A. Egorov (2nd formation)

Commanders
- Notable commanders: Pavel Dybenko; Ivan Konev

The 37th Rifle Division was an infantry division of the Soviet Union's Red Army during World War II.

It served in the North Caucasus Military District; established at Novocherkassk in 1919. In June–July 1939 it was at Omsk preparing for action against Japan in Mongolia, but did not see combat.

In June 1941 it was part of the 21st Rifle Corps in the Western Special Military District, directly under Western Front control. Colonel Andrey Chekharin commanded the division at the time. Soon after the beginning of Operation Barbarossa the division was effectively destroyed, though by 29 June 1941 a composite regiment (20th Rifle Regiment) formed mostly from division rear units (Tyl) was attached to the 153rd Rifle Division.

On 24 July 1941 the Petrozavodsk Rifle Division was formed from the 52nd and 1061st Rifle Regiments of the Red Army and the 15th Motor Rifle Regiment of the NKVD. Two days later it was redesignated the 37th Rifle Division. Later fought at Molodechno and Riga. With 22nd Army of the Reserve of the Supreme High Command (RVGK) May 1945. The division was disbanded on 22 October 1945 with the 100th Rifle Corps in the Odessa Military District.

In 1955 the division was reestablished from the 261st Rifle Division but then finally disbanded by being redesignated the 127th Motor Rifle Division at Leninakan, Armenian SSR, on 25 June 1957.
