= 269th Rifle Division =

- Active: July 1941 – 1946
- Country: Soviet Union
- Branch: Red Army
- Type: Rifle division
- Engagements: World War II
- Decorations: Order of the Red Banner; Order of Kutuzov 2nd class
- Battle honours: Rogachev

The 269th Rifle Division (Russian: 269-я стрелковая дивизия) was an infantry division of the Soviet Union's Red Army during World War II.

Formed in the summer of 1941, the division served with the Bryansk Front in the same area until late 1943, when it began advancing westwards. The 269th fought in Operation Bagration, the southern Baltic states, and the Battle of Berlin during 1944 and 1945. Postwar, it was disbanded in 1946 in Belarus.

== History ==
The 269th began forming on 13 July 1941 from reservists at Kolomna, part of the Moscow Military District. Its basic order of battle included the 1018th, 1020th, and the 1022nd Rifle Regiments, as well as the 836th Artillery Regiment. By 5 August, the division had been moved to Teplukha, and assigned to the 24th Army of the Reserve Front. In mid-August the 269th was transferred to the newly formed 50th Army, but by the end of August the division was part of the 3rd Army in the Bryansk Front. Colonel Andrey Chekharin became division commander in early September. The 269th was encircled during Operation Typhoon and Chekharin was reported missing, presumably killed, during a breakout attempt on 20 October. The division served in roughly the same positions, covering the southern flank of the Moscow defenses, until late 1943.

From late 1943 to early 1944, the division slowly advanced towards the Dnieper as part of the Belorussian Front. The 269th fought in Operation Bagration as part of the 3rd Army's 41st Rifle Corps during the summer of 1944. On 21 July, it received the Order of the Red Banner for its actions. The division then fought in the southern Baltic states in late 1944 as part of the 2nd Belorussian Front and the 3rd Belorussian Front. During April and May 1945 it participated in the Battle of Berlin as part of the 1st Belorussian Front. In the summer of 1945, the division was relocated to Maladzyechna in the Minsk Military District along with the 46th Rifle Corps, where it was disbanded in late 1946.
