= Voronov =

Voronov, Voronoff (Russian: Воронов), or Voronova (feminine; Воронова), is a common Russian surname derived from the word voron (raven). It may refer to the following notable people:

- Alexei Voronov (born 1977), Russian ice hockey player
- Anna Voronova (born 2003), Ukrainian child singer
- Gennady Voronov (1910–1994), Soviet statesman
- Igor Voronov (born 1965), Ukrainian businessman, historian, public figure and philanthropist
- Mikhail Voronov (1840–1873), Russian writer
- Natalya Pomoshchnikova-Voronova (born 1965) Russian athlete
- Nikolay Voronov (1899–1968), Soviet military leader, Chief Marshal of Artillery
- Oktyabrina Voronova (1934–1990), Soviet poet of Sámi origin
- Sergei Voronov (disambiguation), multiple people
- Tatiana Voronova (born 1955), Russian and Latvian chess grandmaster
- Yuri Voronov (disambiguation), multiple people
