= Tetyana Ramus =

Ukrainian artist, designer, TV and radio journalist (born 1980)

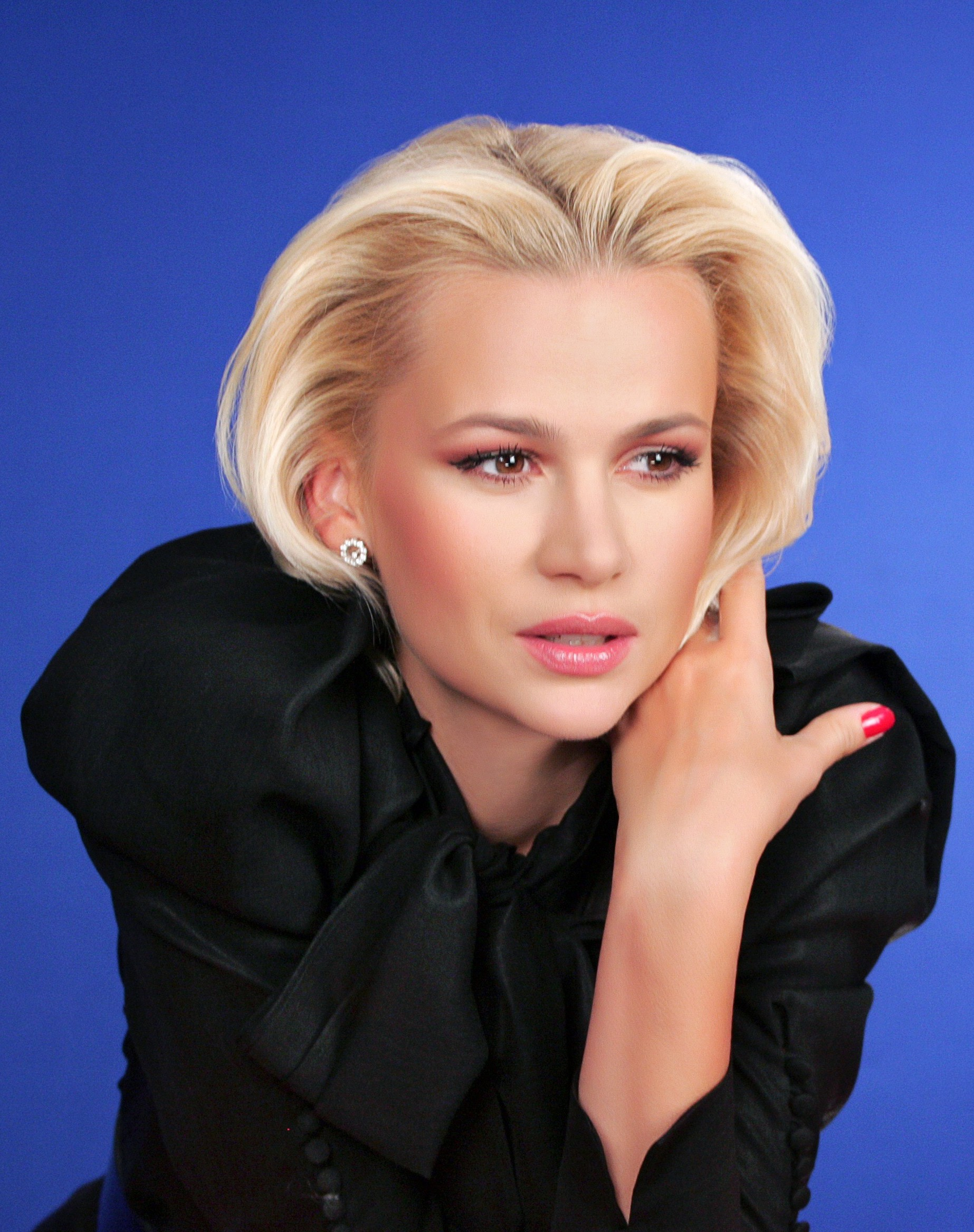
- Born: Тetyana Olehivna Ramus; 17 July 1980 (age 46); Kiev, Ukrainian SSR, Soviet Union, now Ukraine
- Education: Taras Shevchenko National University of Kyiv
- Occupations: artist, designer, TV and radio journalist, public activist, producer, publisher, author, and presenter
- Years active: 1997-present
- Spouse: Igor Voronov
- Children: Anna Voronova
- Parent(s): Oleg Ramus (father); Alla Ramus (mother)

Tetyana Olehivna Ramus (Ukrainian: Тетяна Олегівна Рамус, born 17 July 1980) is an artist, designer, TV and radio journalist, public activist, producer, publisher, author, and presenter.

As of 2019, she has worked as the Ambassador for "White Ribbon Ukraine" and "White Ribbon USA".

== Early life ==
Ramus was born in Kyiv in the Ukrainian SSR. Her father is a specialist in the leather industry and her mother is an economist.

She graduated from high school in 1997, and completed her undergraduate education at Taras Shevchenko National University of Kyiv in 2002.

Simultaneously, Ramus pursued a career in modeling. She worked for modelling agencies "Line 12" and "Karin Models".

In 1998, Ramus married Igor Voronov, a Ukrainian businessman, public figure, and patron of the arts. The couple have a daughter named Anna Voronova.

== Career in television ==
Ramus has been active in the television industry since 1999. From 1999 until 2001, she was the host and subsequently the head of the "M-style" program (STB TV channel), a program displaying the lifestyles of those who achieved success and popularity.

From 2002 to 2004, Ramus was the author and presenter of the TV project "Nota Bené" TET (TV channel). The concept of the program was based on her interviews with famous people and her coverage of large-scale cultural and sporting events in the country. The program framework, made in cooperation with the Reuters agency, also included reporting on the latest news from the world of show business and the film industry.

In 2005, Ramus was the author and presenter of the TV-project "A Special Case" which was broadcast on the Tonis (Ukraine) television channel. The mission of the program was to provide psychological and image assistance to women who had reached a dead end in their lives. Together with a team of professionals, specialists, and psychologists, the necessary tasks were undertaken to change the psychological and visual state of the women. Many of the participants were able to radically change their lives for the better after completing the program.

From 2008 to 2013, Ramus developed the first Ukrainian multimedia social and information project, "Pay attention with Tetyana Ramus!". Each program raised issues in the lives of Ukrainians and also gave specific instructions on how to solve the problems by including advice from experts in the fields of medicine, society, politics, law, and more. The project "Pay attention" when active united four main media formats: television, radio, printed edition, and Internet site ("5 Kanal" and "Inter" TV channels, Radio "Era"; website: www.ramus.ua ).

In 2009 Ramus founded a magazine of the same name, "Pay attention with Tetyana Ramus!", a monthly guide expanding on the issues covered in earlier projects.

In 2010, Ramus presented the cultural and social project "Pay attention on...". Ukrainian celebrities from the politics, culture and sports fields participated. Guests worked with famous artists to express their attitudes towards social problems. Singer Iryna Bilyk together with the artist Alexander Roiburd created a work called "Time that is not enough for good deals!". Oleg Skrypka with Vladislav Shereshevsky wrote a picture "Garbage is all around!". Irena Kilchitskaya and Oksana Mas presented the work "Understand values!". Stella Zakharova and Vladimir Bovkun demonstrated the painting "Love is near!".

Ramus regularly participates as an expert in Internet conferences devoted to issues in Ukrainian life (RBC-Ukraine, FORUA, Glavred, Tochka.net, etc.) in popular discussion TV-shows on Ukraine (TV channel), Inter (TV channel), UA:First ("Talking Ukraine", "About Life", "PravDyvo show with Eva Bazhen").

== #ARTRAMUS ==
In 2012 Ramus founded the brand #ARTRAMUS, which combined modern art and high fashion.

In 2015, in Basel, Switzerland, Tetyana Ramus represented Ukraine at Art Basel, where she presented the series of "Dresses" works. The collection was also presented at the final of the contest "Miss Universe - 2016" in the Philippines.

Ramus's creative workshop, which is also a family art gallery, is located in Kyiv on Pechersk.

In 2019, #ARTRAMUS gallery entered the list of official locations of the art festival Kyiv Art Week. As part of the event program, Ramus presented the first CATS exhibition in the ARTRAMUS space. At the opening of the exhibition, a lecture was held by Nikolai Palazhchenko - art dealer, curator, art critic, art historian and Art Basel VIP Representative in the Baltic and CIS countries.

== Social activity ==
Tetyana Ramus is a permanent active participant, organizer, and partner in various charity and social projects, such as:

- The social project "Pay attention on..." with the participation of the leading persons of the political and creative elite of Ukraine
- Annual Ukrainian National Award "Person of the Year" (2009-2011)
- AVON charity marathons against breast cancer ("One Day Walking for Life") (2008-2011)
- Annual charity marathons "Run Under Chestnuts" (2009-2011)
- The All-Ukrainian Award "Woman of ІІІ Millennium"(2009)
- The All-Ukrainian Award "The Wonder-Child" (2009)

In 2019, Tetyana Ramus joined the White Ribbon Campaign, an international social movement for the protection of victims of domestic violence. The goal of the collaboration is to bring together international and national opinion leaders around the concept #ChangeHelpPrevent.

1 June 2019, #ARTRAMUS headed by Tetyana Ramus and White Ribbon Ukraine held the first joint thematic seminar dedicated to International Children's Day.

In May 2021, Tetyana Ramus took part in a report at the V International Open GR Forum in Istanbul, where she presented to international partners the activities of the White Ribbon Ukraine and the organization's experience in protecting the rights of victims of domestic violence.

In November 2021, the Tetyana Ramus Foundation became a partner of the first Ukrainian mobile application against violence, White Ribbon UA. The application was developed and launched with the support of the Democracy Fund of the US Embassy in Ukraine.

Additionally, within the “16 days against violence” campaign in November 2021, Tetyana Ramus together with “White Ribbon” implemented the social art project “This is not a game” with the support of Ministry of Culture and Information Policy.

The Information art exhibition was presented in Verkhovna Rada of Ukraine with the participation of parliamentarians.

== Other projects ==
In 2011, Tetyana took part in the shooting of the short film "Actors" (one of the main roles, directed by Tetyana Goncharova).

She participates in performances of the project "Theatre Without Actors" ("Old New Story", scriptwriter and director — Natalia Vodolazko, Kiev, 2016).

In 2015, she started "The Academy of Adulthood for Teenagers" — an alternative educational program for teenagers.

== Awards ==
- 1st-place winner in the contest "Black Pearl" in the nomination "The best model - TV presenter in Ukraine" (2001)
- Award Fondazione Mazzoleni "For international Artist" (Italy, Venice, 2017)

== See also ==
- Natasha Zinko
- Oksana Mukha
