= Dukhovshchina =

Dukhovshchina (Russian: Духовщина) is the name of several inhabited localities in Russia.

Urban localities

- Dukhovshchina, Smolensk Oblast, a town in Dukhovshchinsky District of Smolensk Oblast

Rural localities

- Dukhovshchina, Irkutsk Oblast, a village in Bayandayevsky District of Irkutsk Oblast
