= Sergey Voronov =

Sergey Voronov may refer to:

- Sergei Voronov (figure skater) (born 1987), Russian figure skater
- Sergei Voronov (ice hockey) (born 1971), Russian ice hockey player
- Sergey Voronov (footballer) (born 1988), Russian association football player
- Serge Voronoff (1866–1951), French surgeon of Russian origin
