= Oksana Mukha =

Ukrainian fashion designer

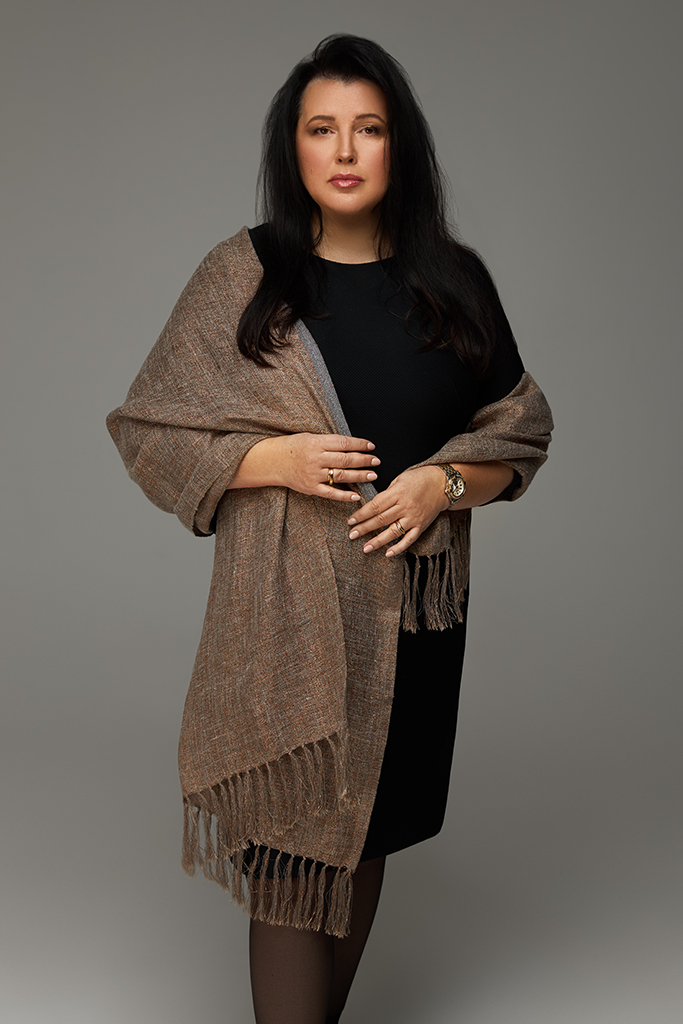
- Mukha in 2010
- Born: September 1, 1964 (age 61); Lviv
- Citizenship: Ukraine
- Education: Lviv National Academy of Arts
- Known for: Ukrainian fashion designer, creator of evening gowns and wedding dresses
- Spouse: Vasyl Yalovyi
- Children: Son: Vsevolod; Daughters: Kateryna and Solomiya
- Website: oksana-mukha.com

Oksana Mukha (born September 1, 1964) is a Ukrainian designer of bridal and occasional wear. Dresses of her brand OKSANA MUKHA were chosen by members of the presidential family of Ukraine, the royal family in France, the imperial house in Tokyo, actors of Ukrainian and world cinema, celebrities, and opera divas.

== Biography ==
Oksana Mukha was born on September 1, 1964, in Lviv.

In 1985, Oksana became a student at the National Academy of Arts. During her studies, she developed her unique style.

=== Career ===
In 1990, she started her own business, which later grew into the OKSANA MUKHA brand, operating in the market for more than 30 years.

In 1991, she launched her business by creating her first collections of bridal dresses, initially in a workshop in her own apartment and later in a rented studio. In 1994, she founded the "Galvestmoda" enterprise. At the beginning of 2006, OKSANA MUKHA opened a new distribution market in the US, starting cooperation with the "Diamond Bridal Gallery" company in California. At the same time, she established the OKSANA MUKHA brand. In the same year, the company entered the markets of Italy (Modena) and Kazakhstan (Almaty).

In 2007, Oksana entered the markets of the Republic of South Africa (Pretoria) and Lithuania (Kaunas). She is a member of the Union of Designers of Ukraine.

== OKSANA MUKHA brand ==
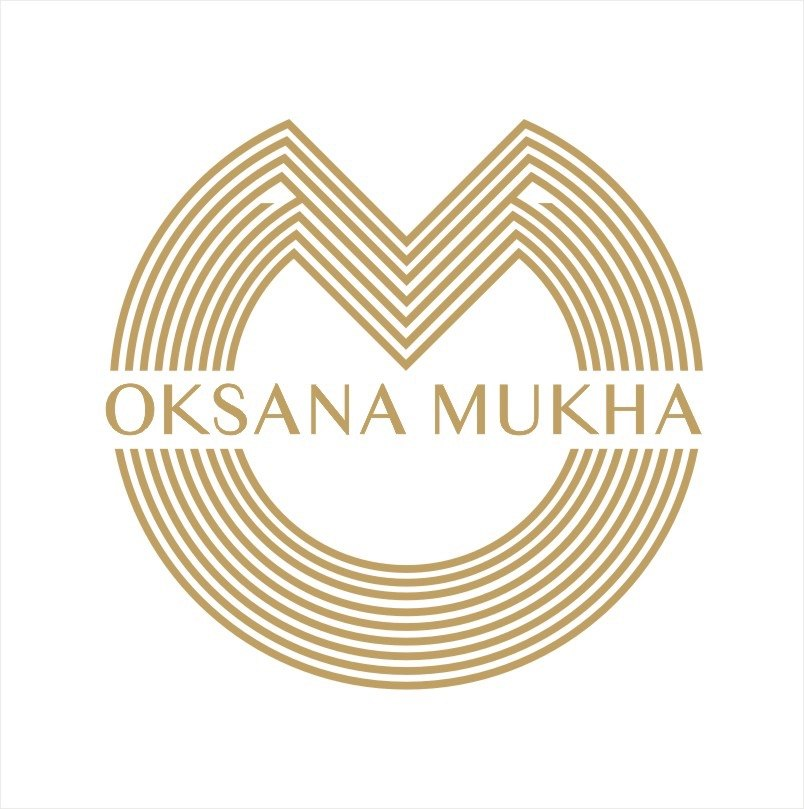
Logo of the OKSANA MUKHA brand

The OKSANA MUKHA brand was the first in Ukraine to introduce elements of "haute couture" into its bridal and occasional wear. The brand's current positioning emphasizes an individual couture approach to each design and draws on the traditions of Alta Moda. It identifies intricate design, work with lace and decorative elements, and attention to fit as characteristic elements of its bridal and eveningwear. In 2000, her company opened a brand salon in Lviv, with an area of 400 square meters, making it the largest in the region. In 2004, the company expanded into the German market and continued growing internationally. In 2008, the first monobrand boutique "Oksana Mukha Paris" was opened in France.

In October 2009, she presented a collection of wedding models at a specialized exhibition in the Louvre in Paris, as part of the 115th anniversary celebration of Swarovski. Among 150 international companies producing bridal and occasional wear, Swarovski selected OKSANA MUKHA to participate in the final show. Five dresses from the collection were featured on the catwalk, including the "Crystal Swan" dress with unique crystal embroidery, which was exhibited alongside five models from different world brands in the Swarovski showroom at the Louvre.

Since the beginning of 2012, the OKSANA MUKHA brand has showcased its collections at international specialized exhibitions. Oksana Mukha's son, Vsevolod Yalovy, became the company's executive director. Oksana Mukha's daughter, Kateryna Yalova, serves as the company's creative director and, together with her mother, creates collections of bridal and occasional wear.

As of 2020, OKSANA MUKHA offices were open in Paris, Prague, Toronto, Melbourne, Dortmund, Padua, Kaunas, Riga, Tallinn, Warsaw, Tashkent, Almaty, Miami, New York, Bucharest, Tokyo, Sydney, Dubai, Venezuela, South Africa, and more. Today, the OKSANA MUKHA brand is represented in more than 70 countries. Oleksandra Klepacka, the representative of Poland at the "Miss Universe 2022" contest, chose a dress from OKSANA MUKHA for the gala evening prior to the contest's opening. Actress Merle Dandridge wore a dress by the brand at the Hollywood premiere of the second season of The Last of Us, while media personality Rachel Uchitel selected an OKSANA MUKHA dress for her wedding.

In October 2023, Oksana Mukha presented her "Attraverso dei tempi" collection at the Mélange de Blanc exhibition in New York, featuring a range of wedding and evening dresses. In August 2024, the Ukrainian brand OKSANA MUKHA launched its Pearl wedding dress collection, inspired by the Rothschild family villa on the French Riviera. The collection was first showcased at the Barcelona Bridal Fashion Week, with a subsequent presentation in September 2024 at the National Bridal Market in Chicago.

=== International recognition ===
OKSANA MUKHA has participated in international bridal exhibitions and fashion events, including presentations in Paris, New York, Barcelona and Chicago. Its international profile has also included collaborations with celebrities, influencers and public figures. Dresses by the brand have been worn by members of French royal families and representatives of the Imperial House of Japan, as well as actors, singers and opera performers.

Among the famous clients of the OKSANA MUKHA fashion house are Oksana Bilozir, Ilona Gvozdyova, Zoryana Kushpler, Ukrainian singer Oksana Mukha, Melanie Modran, opera diva Anna Kasyan of Paris, and Maryna Poroshenko. They are joined by Laura Lempicka, Jessica Minh Anh, Ophelie Mezino, Eva Colas, and Kateryna Osadcha. The brand exports its products to 70 countries, including Germany, France, Italy, Poland, the United States, and the United Kingdom.

Anna, the granddaughter of Charles de Gaulle, selected two dresses from the OKSANA MUKHA brand at a Paris boutique for her wedding.

OKSANA MUKHA's collections featured in numerous influential glossy magazines, including "Sposa Book," "Collezioni Sposa," "Collezioni Haute Couture" (Italy), "OK!", "Wedding Magazine," "inSTYLE," "Elle Spain," "New York Times Weekly," "MODATEX," "Panna Młoda," "Forever," "Point De Vue" (France), "Elle Italy," "Vogue," "Haute Couture Sposa," and "Harper's Bazaar Vietnam".

== Public activity ==
Oksana Mukha and her brand, OKSANA MUKHA, engage in charitable initiatives, frequently participating in charity events and campaigns.

The brand's team contributed to various efforts, including producing camouflage gear and purchasing vehicles for the Ukrainian Armed Forces. Additionally, they provided volunteer support to aid the military during Russia's aggression against Ukraine, focusing on addressing humanitarian needs.

== Awards ==
In 2008, Oksana Mukha's company was awarded the Grand Prix at the "Zloty Wieszak" exhibition (Lublin, Poland) for its original creativity and the promotion of Ukrainian traditions on the world stage. According to the international economic rating "League of the Best," in 2010, the company "OKSANA MUKHA" ranked 2nd among enterprises of all forms of ownership in the category "Production of other clothing and accessories." It was awarded the "Star of the Economy of Ukraine" order, along with a personal certificate and the title "Manager of 2010".

In 2011, Oksana Mukha was named Best Wedding Designer at the Ukrainian Wedding Awards.

In early March 2013, Oksana Mukha was awarded the Order of Queen Anna "Honor of the Fatherland," which recognizes women for outstanding achievements in state, industrial, public, scientific, educational, cultural, charitable, and other social activities.

In 2016, Oksana Mukha was included in the list of the Top 50 Successful Women of the Lviv region.

In 2021, the OKSANA MUKHA brand received the Business Award 2021 from the International Business Forum.

In 2022, the quality of the brand's products was confirmed by the ISO 9001:2015 International Quality Management Certificate, and the company also received the LEAN certificate for implementing lean thinking methodology in production.

== Personal life ==
Oksana Mukha is married to Vasyl Yalovyy, a designer and architect. They have three children, all of whom work for the family company, OKSANA MUKHA. Their son, Vsevolod Yalovyy, serves as the CEO of the company. Their elder daughter, Kateryna Yalova, is the chief designer who collaborates with Oksana Mukha in creating new collections. The younger daughter, Solomiya Yalova, is the Chief of the Wholesale Department, overseeing global distribution and client relations for the brand.
