= Anna Voronova =

Ukrainian singer (born 2003)

Anna Voronova Анна Воронова
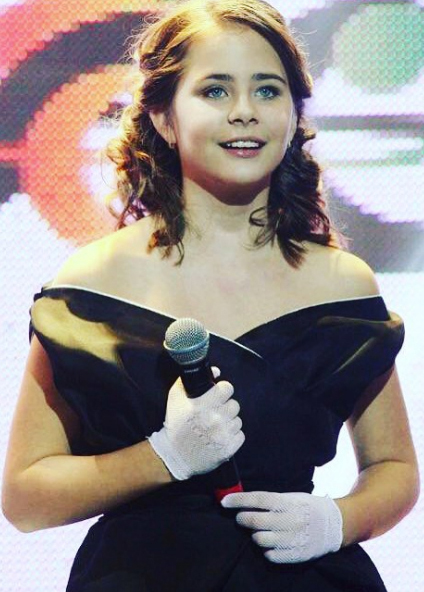
- Voronova performing in 2015

Background information
- Born: Анна Ігорівна Воронова; December 5, 2003 (age 22); Kyiv, Ukraine
- Genres: Jazz, pop, pop-rock music
- Occupation: Singer
- Years active: 2010-present
- Website: annavoronova.com
- Parents: Igor Voronov (father); Tetyana Ramus (mother)

Anna Voronova (Ukrainian: Анна Ігорівна Воронова; born December 5, 2003, Kyiv, Ukraine) is a Ukrainian singer, laureate of the special prize of the "Sanremo Junior" festival, silver prizewinner of the “Euro Pop Contest Berliner Perle” vocal contest, Grand Prix winner of the International Festival “Mediterranean Sea”, participant of the “Voice. Children-3 "(«Голос. Дети-3», Dmytro Monatik's team).

== Biography ==
Anna Voronova was born in the family of Ukrainian TV presenter, journalist, artist, and designer Tetyana Ramus and Ukrainian businessman and philanthropist Igor Voronov.

At the age of three, she was selected for the children's preparatory theatrical school "Chunga-Changa" (Kyiv). At the age of six, after three years of classes in acting, rhetoric, direction, and cinematography, Voronova entered the international lyceum.

From 2012-2013, she studied theater in Los Angeles, California: "Diane Christiansen Coaching", "3-2-1 Talent Showcase Acting School with Mae Ross", and "Glee Musical Theater Camp / Kids on Stage" (Los Angeles). Voronova is engaged in ballroom dances, and hip-hop in the school of dance "Millenium", playing the piano, flute, and saxophone.

Since 2016, Voronova becomes a participant in TV projects "Music Academy Junior", and "Generation Junior".

Besides, she participates in various charity events.

== Vocal activity ==
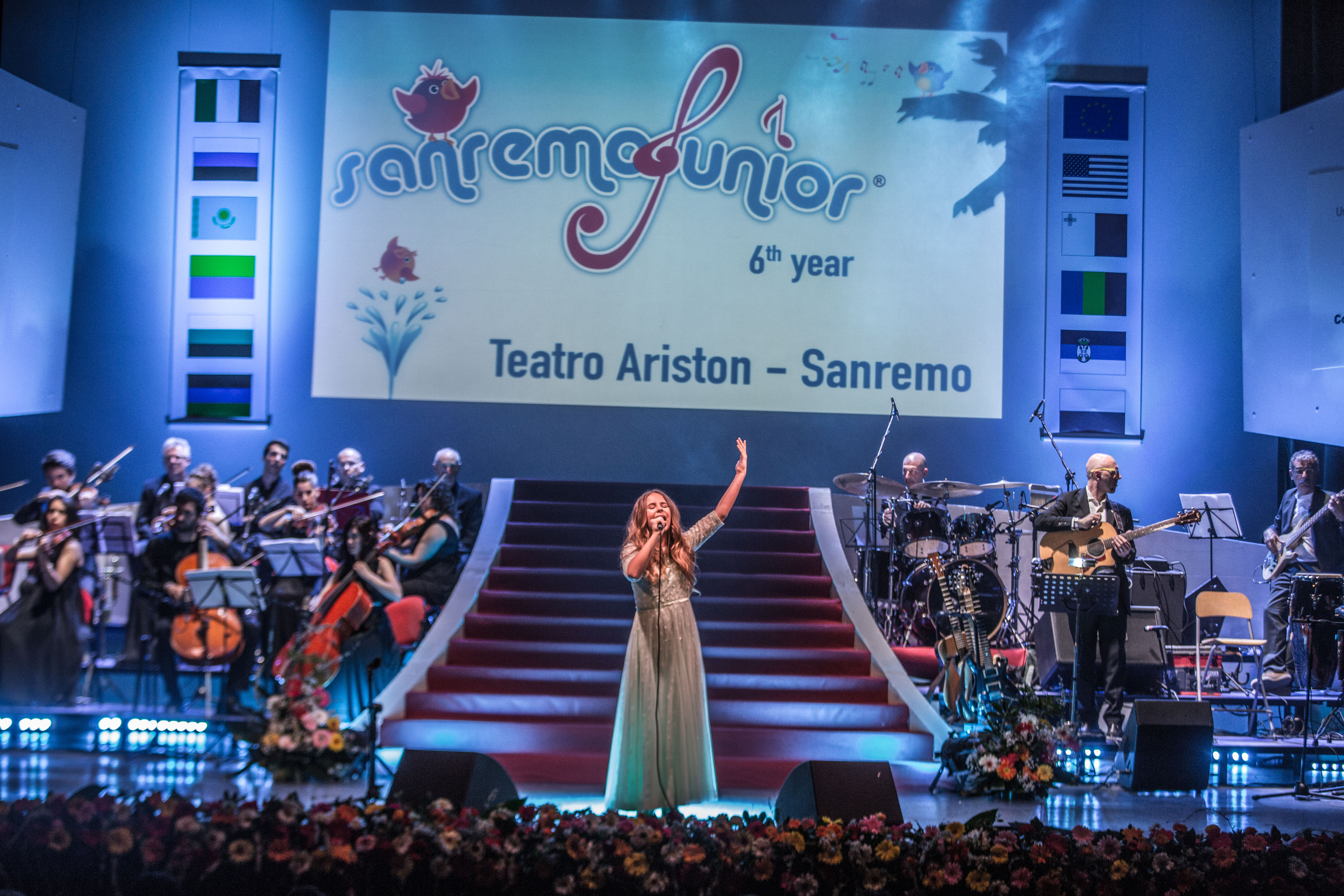
Anna Voronova at the "Sanremo Junior" festival, 2015

Since 2014, Voronova has been professionally engaged in singing in the production center "PARADIZ". In 2014, she took part in the II International festival-competition of musical art "Kyiv color", where she became a laureate of the first degree in the nomination "Variety Vocal".

In the same year, she took the 2nd place in the Vocals nomination at the VIII TV festival "TV START" (Kyiv), became the laureate of the 1st prize of the XVI All-Ukrainian festival-contest "Children's Song Opening Day" (Kyiv) and the laureate of the 1st prize in the International Festival "Paradise Holiday" in Greece.

In 2015, Voronova won a special prize in the middle age category of the International vocal competition the «Sanremo Junior» festival in Italy.

In 2016, she participated in the project of the TV channel "1 + 1" "The Voice Kids (Ukrainian season 3)". On blind auditions on October 9, 2016, Voronova sang the song of John Newman "Love me again" and went to the Monatik’s team.

At the same year, Voronova became the winner of the "Future of the Nation" prize in the nomination "Talented Child Ukraine" (Kyiv). Also, she became the finalist of the Young Voice of Music Box vocal project, took 2nd place in the "Euro Pop Contest Berliner Perle" vocal competition in Berlin, Germany and won the Grand Prix of the International Festival "Mediterranean Sea" in Israel.

In May 2018, at the annual International Music Festival "PARADISE HOLIDAY" in Greece, Voronova won a special prize - a creative duet with the band "THE HARDKISS".

Also, within the framework of the festival, Voronova became an owner of the Grand Prix of the model contest "Fashion models Paradise" and won the cover of the magazine "Young Lady".
