= Dukhovshchina, Irkutsk Oblast =

Dukhovshchina Духовщина
- Village
- Location within Irkutsk Oblast Location within Russia
- Coordinates: 53°12′N 105°58′E
- Country: Russia
- Region: Irkutsk Oblast
- District: Bayandayevsky District
- Time zone: UTC+8:00

Dukhovshchina (Russian: Духовщина) is a rural locality (a village) in Bayandayevsky District, Irkutsk Oblast, Russia. Population: 51 (2010 census);

== Geography ==
This rural locality is located 35 kilometres (22 mi) from Bayanday (the district's administrative centre), 152 kilometres (94 mi) from Irkutsk (capital of Irkutsk Oblast) and 4,561 kilometres (2,834 mi) from Moscow. Khogot is the nearest rural locality.
