= Yuri Voronov =

Yury Voronov, with the given name also written as Yuri or Juri and the surname given as Woronov, may refer to the following notable people:

- Yury Voronov (botanist) (1874–1931), Russian botanist
- Yuri Voronov (archaeologist) (1941–1995), politician and academic from Abkhazia
