= Igor Voronov =

Ukrainian businessman (born 1965)

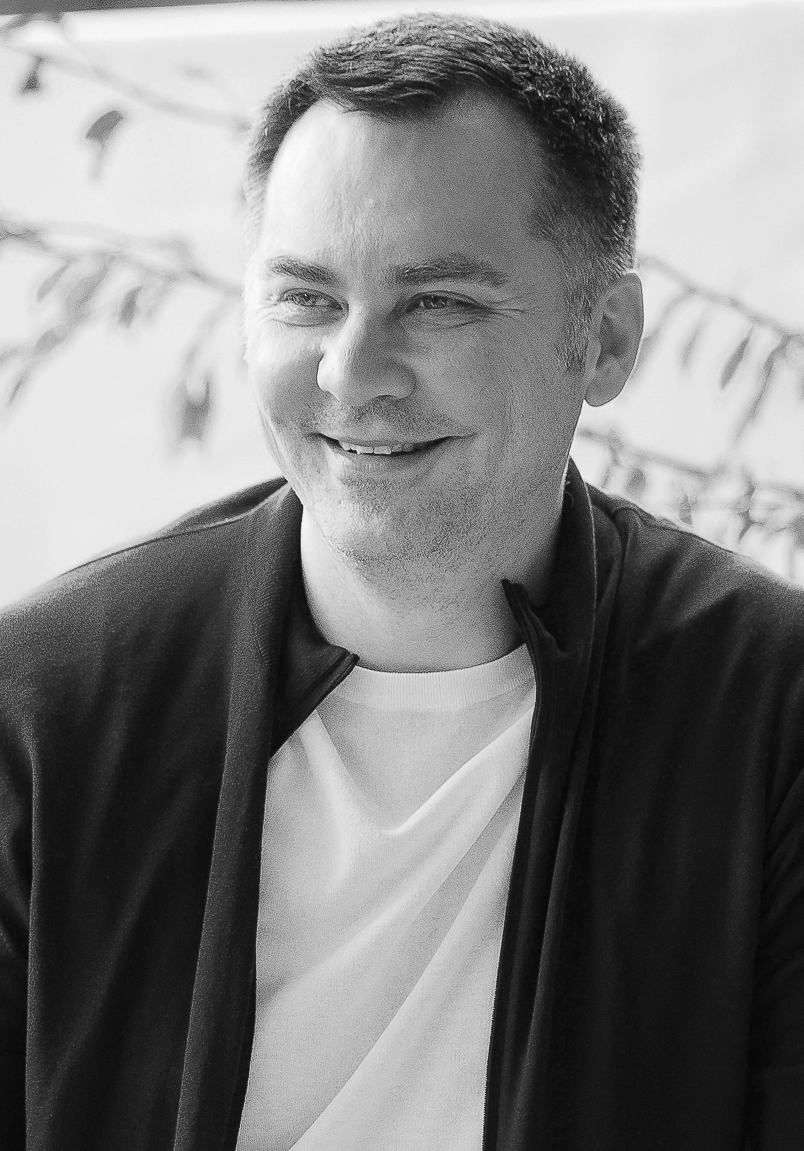
- Born: Igor Oleksiyovych Voronov; April 25, 1965 (age 61); Almaty, Soviet Union
- Education: Taras Shevchenko National University of Kyiv
- Occupations: businessman, historian, public figure, philanthropist
- Spouse: Tetyana Ramus
- Children: Anna Voronova
- Awards: Order of Honor (Georgia)

Igor Oleksiyovych Voronov (Ukrainian: Ігор Олексі́йович Во́ронов, born April 25, 1965) is a Ukrainian businessman, historian, public figure, philanthropist, and the founder of the Voronov Art Foundation (2008). Doctor of Political Sciences (2003), Professor at the State University of Information and Communication Technologies (2004).

== Biography ==
In 1987 Voronov graduated from the Faculty of History at Taras Shevchenko National University of Kyiv. From 1987 to 1990 he worked as a researcher at the Institute of History of Ukraine. In 1994–1997 he worked with non-governmental organizations. From 1997 to 2000 he was an associate professor and head of the Department of Humanities at the Kyiv State Academy of Water Transport. Since 2001 he has worked at the State University of Information and Communication Technologies as head of the Institute of Distance Learning.

In 1997, he presented his thesis on "Formation of the rule of law in Ukraine (political science aspect)." In 2003, he defended his doctoral dissertation on "The rule of law as a subject of political science: history, theory, research methodology."

Voronov is the author of more than 150 scholar works, as well as of the book "Democratic Transition: The Human Dimension of Politics."

Voronov is married to Tetyana Ramus, Ukrainian artist and public activist. The couple has a daughter, Anna Voronova (born 2003).

== Business ==
Voronov's main businesses include private investment, insurance and restaurant business, art. His main assets are the UNIQA Insurance Company (formerly Credo Classic, sold in 2010), «Fellini» Restaurant and «Ukraine» movie theatre, Voronov Art Foundation, ITC (CDMA Ukraine). He is co-owner of VEK Capital Partners.

== Art activity ==
Voronov is one of the most well-known philanthropists originating from Ukraine. He is noted for having one of the largest collection of sculptures and paintings in Eastern Europe (works by Alexander Archipenko, Constantin Brâncuși, Alberto and Diego Giacometti, Auguste Rodin, sculptures by Edgar Degas, Salvador Dali and others).

Voronov began collecting art works in the early 1990s, when his partners presented him two paintings by Volodymyr Bovkun and Les Podervianskyi. "And somewhere in the middle of 90s, I realized that I had always liked art," Voronov said in one of his interviews.

In 2008 he founded Voronov Art-foundation. All projects under his patronage are related to fine arts, as well as organization of exhibitions based on his own collection. Thanks to that, Ukrainians have repeatedly had the opportunity to see actual works by Alexander Archipenko, Constantin Brâncuși, Edgar Degas, Alberto and Diego Giacometti, Amedeo Modigliani, Pablo Picasso, Demetre Chiparus and other artists from different countries.

Voronov's private collection also embraces more than 2,000 works by contemporary Ukrainian artists. As a philanthropist, Voronov supports Ukrainian art world. In 2009, he covered all the logistic and customs expenses of Ukrainian artists to the Sotheby's auction, where contemporary Ukrainian paintings were presented for the first time. Voronov is a member of the «Mystetskyi Arsenal Friends Club» and holder of the club card № 1 within the "100 first patrons of the Art Arsenal" event.

== Social activity ==
From 2000 to 2010 he held the position of Vice President of the Ukrainian Association of Football. From 2001 he is the President of the Youth Football Union of Ukraine and Ukrainian Youth Football League.

== Honors ==
Igor Voronov was awarded the Order of Honor of Georgia.
