= 178th Rifle Division =

178th Rifle Division (August 18, 1939 - April 1946)
- Active: 1939–1946
- Country: Soviet Union
- Branch: Red Army
- Type: Infantry
- Size: Division
- Engagements: Operation Barbarossa; Battle of Smolensk (1941); Yelnya offensive Battle of Moscow; Battles of Rzhev; Operation Mars; Operation Büffel; Smolensk operation Battle of Nevel (1943); Continuation War; Vyborg–Petrozavodsk offensive Courland Pocket
- Decorations: Order of the Red Banner
- Battle honours: Kulagin

Commanders
- Notable commanders: Col. Nikolai Ivanovich Starukhin; Col. Aleksandr Petrovich Kvashnin; Maj. Gen. Aleksandr Georgievich Kudryavtsev; Maj. Gen. Aleksandr Lvovich Kronik; Col. Iosif Ivanovich Lebedinskii

The 178th Rifle Division was formed as an infantry division of the Red Army in the Siberian Military District, based on the shtat (table of organization and equipment) of September 13, 1939, on the basis of the separate 386th Rifle Regiment. Following the German invasion it was moved west and concentrated west of Moscow as part of 24th Army in early July. Late that month the Army was assigned to Reserve Front. While this Army played the main role in the successful offensive at Yelnya, the 178th was held in reserve. In late August, in response to a German drive against 22nd Army on the right flank of Western Front, the division was moved by rail and truck northward to join 29th Army in the vicinity of Nelidovo, to cover the gap between that Army and the 22nd. When Army Group Center launched Operation Typhoon in early October the 29th Army was not directly affected, but soon had to fall back to the northeast under pressure from German 9th Army, giving up the town of Rzhev in the process. On October 17 the 29th Army became part of the new Kalinin Front, and later in the month the 178th was moved to 22nd Army. On January 15, 1942, the Army went over to the counteroffensive, and the 178th soon found itself fighting to regain territory around Rzhev that it had been forced from months before. In February, the division was reassigned to 30th Army, and it remained in that Army through the summer battles for the Rzhev salient. During Operation Mars, in November, it was in 39th Army, and managed to gain ground during this otherwise failed offensive. During March 1943 the 178th took part in the pursuit of the German forces evacuating the salient, but soon came up on the extensive fortifications that had been built at its base, and remained facing them into August. When offensive fighting resumed the Army's objective was the town of Dukhovshchina, but it was only taken after heavy combat well into September. Once the town was taken the division was awarded a battle honor. Shortly after it was reassigned to 3rd Shock Army, still in Kalinin Front (soon renamed 1st Baltic Front). During the fall and winter campaign of 1943/44 it faced the heavily fortified German positions just east of Novosokolniki as part of 2nd Baltic Front's 11th Guards and 22nd Armies, and finally liberated that town in late January 1944, earning the Order of the Red Banner. It left the fighting front in late March for a period of rebuilding in the Reserve of the Supreme High Command; when it returned in May it was assigned to 21st Army in Leningrad Front. During the Vyborg–Petrozavodsk offensive it took part in the final drive toward Vyborg as part of 23rd Army, and after this city was taken all three rifle regiments of the 178th were awarded its name as honorifics. The division remained facing Finland until early 1945, when it was moved to Latvia and spent the remainder of the war containing the German forces trapped in Courland, eventually assisting in clearing the region after the German surrender in May. It was moved to the Gorkii Military District in August, and was disbanded there in April 1946.

== Formation ==
The division was formed between August 18 and September 9, 1939, in the Altai region; the 386th Regiment was stationed at Slavgorod. Later the new regiments were stationed at Omsk and Tatarsk. Following an inspection in early 1941 it was rated as one of the best in the Siberian Military District. Its order of battle on June 22, 1941, was as follows (including later additions):

- 386th Rifle Regiment
- 693rd Rifle Regiment
- 709th Rifle Regiment
- 332nd Artillery Regiment
- 432nd Howitzer Artillery Regiment (until September 27, 1941)
- 213th Antitank Battalion (until September 27, 1941, then from February 10, 1942)
- 239th Antiaircraft Battery (later 178th Antiaircraft Battalion) (until May 5, 1943)
- 430th Mortar Battalion (from November 1, 1941, to October 10, 1942)
- 467th Machinegun Battalion (from October 1, 1942, to May 5, 1943)
- 139th Reconnaissance Company (later 139th Reconnaissance Battalion)
- 211th Sapper Battalion
- 227th Signal Battalion (later 579th Signal Company)
- 218th Medical/Sanitation Battalion
- 156th Chemical Defense (Anti-gas) Company
- 93rd Motor Transport Company (later 225th Motor Transport Battalion)
- 266th Field Bakery (later 138th Motorized Field Bakery)
- 88th Divisional Veterinary Hospital
- 484th Field Postal Station (later 227th)
- 247th Field Office of the State Bank

Col. Nikolai Ivanovich Starukhin transitioned from command of the 386th Regiment to command of the full division when it began forming. He would remain in this position until August 1, 1941. At the outbreak of war with Germany it was part of 53rd Rifle Corps, along with the 107th and 133rd Rifle Divisions. This Corps was assigned to 24th Army in the Reserve of the STAVKA High Command. The 178th began moving west from Siberia by rail in late June, and by the start of July was concentrating west of Moscow.

== Battle of Smolensk ==
On July 1 the 24th Army was still officially a separate Army within the STAVKA Reserve, but by 10 days later it was part of the Group of STAVKA Reserve Armies, and 53rd Corps had gained the 248th Rifle Division. On July 30 the headquarters of Reserve Front was formed, to be located at Gzhatsk and with Army Gen. G. K. Zhukov appointed as commander. 24th Army, now with seven rifle divisions, a tank division, a motorized division, and an assortment of artillery assets, was assigned a sector from Ugriumovo Station on the left to Luzhki (60km south of Vyazma) to Popovka (10km south of Yelnya) and Pochinok. The Army's headquarters was to be at Semlyovo. On August 1, Colonel Starukhin left the division and was replaced by Lt. Col. Aleksandr Petrovich Kvashnin; this officer had been serving as the division's chief of staff. He had been arrested in 1939 in the late stage of the Great Purge, but was reinstated to the Red Army the next year. He would be promoted to the rank of colonel on January 15, 1942.

=== Yelnya Offensive ===
24th Army was under the command of Maj. Gen. K. I. Rakutin, an NKVD officer who had previously led 31st Army. On August 3, Gen. H. Guderian's 2nd Panzer Group captured Roslavl, which created a "dangerous hole" in the Red Army's defenses east of Smolensk. As a result, at 0216 hours on August 6 the STAVKA issued orders to Zhukov to use forces of Reserve Front to attack and retake Guderian's concentrated forces in a bridgehead around Yelnya, as well as his grouping at Roslavl. The Yelnya operation was assigned to 24th Army and would be led by the 107th and 100th Rifle Divisions. Zhukov acted quickly and by 2000 had sent his orders to Rakutin; they categorically stated that the STAVKA attached "exceptional significance to the El'nia region". The 178th was not part of the attacking force but remained in second echelon. The salient was now held by three divisions of XX Army Corps. Despite these preparations, Zhukov suspended the launch of the attack 24 hours later, partly due to a new threat that had developed elsewhere, and partly due to his realization of the poor state of training of most of his forces. He would spend the following day reorganizing his defenses and conducting exercises.

The offensive finally got underway on August 8. The plan remained much as previous, although the main shock group was now reinforced. This first effort made hardly a dent in the German lines. The assaults continued almost every day during August 12-20, with continuous reshuffling of units along with threats, warnings, and demotions to command staffs. While 24th Army gained little ground, casualties on both sides were heavy. At 0445 hours on August 21, Zhukov finally admitted to Stalin that the offensive would have to be suspended for rest, refitting, and further training of 24th Army. He proposed restarting on August 25. At about this time the 178th was transferred, relatively intact, to the 29th Army of Western Front.

==== Move to the north ====
This fairly lengthy move was conducted by truck and by rail. On September 2 one train with some of the division's equipment departed Vyazma station. By the evening six more trains had been loaded and sent out, while the first was being unloaded at Nelidovo station. Meanwhile, the 386th Regiment was concentrating in the woods south of that place by 2000 hours, while the lead elements of the 709th and 693rd Regiments were at Bosino (13km southeast of Bely) at 1730. This movement continued the next day, with 11 more trains being unloaded and all the trucked forces concentrating at Nelidovo. By 2000 on September 5 the 178th was reported as having completed concentrating in the Mukhino, Zhivilka, and Zuevo region by 1300. 29th Army, under command of Lt. Gen. I. I. Maslennikov, had just three other divisions (243rd, 246th, 252nd), all of which had been formed from NKVD cadres. The context of the movement was a late-August attack by 3rd Panzer Group which had battered the 22nd Army and taken the town of Toropets. The 178th was deployed in order to cover the boundary between 29th and 22nd Armies.

=== Operation Typhoon ===
The front remained relatively quiet through the rest of September, as Army Group Center built up for what it intended to be the final drive on Moscow. On September 27, just before this blow fell, Lt. Colonel Kvashnin handed his 432nd Howitzer Artillery Regiment and 213th Antitank Battalion over to Maslennikov's direct command. At the end of September six of the armies of Western Front, now under command of Col. Gen. I. S. Konev, were occupying a defense in a sector 347km wide along a line from Lake Seliger to west of Andreapol to Yartsevo to Yelnya. The plan of defense designated counterattacks in the event of a German penetration. In case of the counterattacks' failures it was planned to fall back to the prepared rear army-level line of defense and continue the battle there.

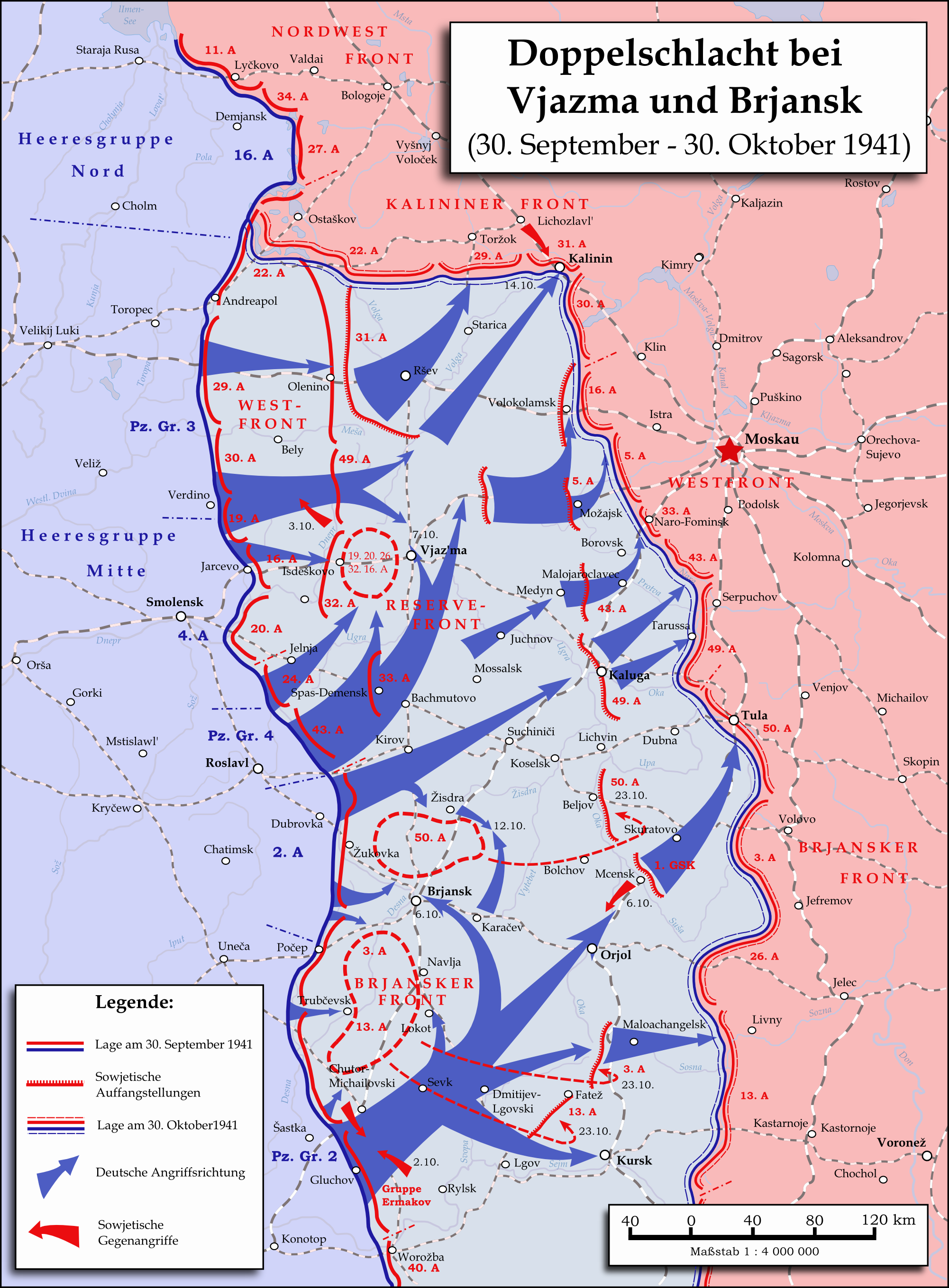
Operation Typhoon. Note positions of 29th and 22nd Armies in the north.

Operation Typhoon began at 0530 hours on October 2 and the forces of 3rd Panzer Group and 9th Army soon penetrated along the boundary between 19th and 30th Armies. On the afternoon of October 5 the Chief of the General Staff, Marshal B. M. Shaposhnikov, summoned Konev to a telegraph machine for talks. Konev reported that the situation of the 22nd and 29th Armies was unchanged, and (erroneously) that the penetration of 30th Army had been held up. Shaposhnikov stated that his information indicated that "your situation at Belyi has become difficult." Konev replied that fighting at Bely was ongoing (in fact it had already fallen) and that Maslennikov had departed for there.

By October 7 all was confusion on the Soviet side of the lines. Western Front was largely out of contact with its forces. Focused on cobbling together a force that could prevent the fall of Moscow, at 0200 hours on October 10 the STAVKA ordered seven rifle divisions pulled out of Western Front's right wing, but this did not include the 178th. However, the 930th Rifle Regiment of 256th Rifle Division was left behind as a reserve for 22nd Army; this regiment eventually came under operational control of the 178th. During October 11-12 the separate 199th Artillery Battalion was defending a heavily fortified position at Olenino, firing at the approaching German columns. At 1530 hours on the latter date the battalion commander received an order from Maslennikov to spike the guns and destroy important facilities before retreating to Rzhev. After nightfall the battalion opened fire on all pre-registered targets to expend the remaining ammunition, then set out with the wounded and mobile guns for a rendezvous with the 178th.

The German 26th Infantry Division captured Rzhev on October 15, seizing the bridge over the Volga River in the process. The 178th, 174th, and 250th Rifle Divisions, on the right flank of 29th Army, as well as part of the adjoining 22nd Army, were being forced northward by German 9th Army's XXIII Army Corps. On the evening of October 17 the STAVKA attempted to clear up command and control issues around Kalinin by creating Kalinin Front, under Konev, and containing 22nd, 29th, and 30th Armies, plus a group of forces under command of Lt. Gen. N. F. Vatutin. By the beginning of November the 178th had been transferred to 22nd Army, still with the 930th Regiment attached.

== Moscow Counteroffensive ==
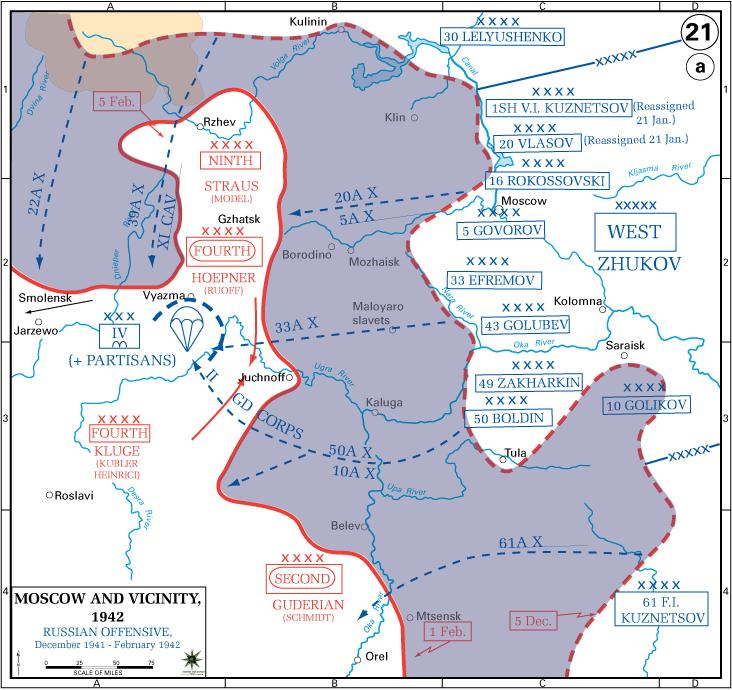
Moscow counteroffensive. Note advance of 22nd Army on the far left.

At the start of 1942 the 22nd Army consisted of the 178th, 179th, 186th, and 357th Rifle Divisions, plus one regiment of the 220th Rifle Division and the 129th Tank Brigade. Despite these scant and understrength forces, it went over to the offensive on January 15, under command of Maj. Gen. V. I. Vostrukhov, and drove 120km to the south and southeast, deeply enveloping the German grouping at Olenino, which consisted of seven divisions. Air transport was required to keep them in supply, while part of 22nd Army advanced on Bely. In cooperation with forces of 39th Army the German Bely grouping was compressed along the Bely–Dukhovshchina road, where it set up a firm defense. On January 16 the 4th Shock Army retook Andreapol, and five days later cleared Toropets, creating a huge salient to the west of 9th Army.

During the course of this fighting advance, Jr. Lt. Salavat Khakimovich Karymov distinguished himself sufficiently to be made a Hero of the Soviet Union. A Tatar by nationality, he had been a pre-war reservist and saw action during the Winter War. At this time he was in command of a battalion of the 709th Rifle Regiment. Between January 26 and February 5 he effectively led his battalion in attacks on the villages of Kharino, Struyskoye, and Frolovo near Rzhev. In the course of these operations heavy casualties were inflicted and a large amount of German equipment was captured or destroyed. On May 5 his award was proclaimed. He continued to serve for the duration, eventually reaching the rank of major and the position of deputy commander of the 709th, while being wounded 11 times. In 1947 he returned to the reserve and on May 11, 1985 he died at Kazan, where he was buried.

== Battles for Rzhev ==
The second phase of the Rzhev-Vyazma operation began at the start of February, when German forces launched counterstrokes in all the main directions of the Soviet operations. The Soviet armies were significantly weakened from casualties and were mostly operating on very tenuous supply lines. All efforts to liberate Vyazma had failed. On February 5, most of 29th Army was cut off from 39th Army and encircled. After several attempts to rejoin with 39th, by mid-month it was decided to regroup to join hands with 22nd Army. By the end of February only 5,200 personnel had managed to escape. Meanwhile, the 22nd was attempting to finally seize Bely as a preliminary to eliminating the German Olenino grouping, but this was unsuccessful.

By the beginning of March the 178th had been reassigned to 30th Army, still in Kalinin Front. On April 29, Colonel Kvashnin left the division, and on May 9 took over the 134th Rifle Division. In December he was moved to command the 17th Guards Rifle Division, which he would lead into the postwar, being promoted to the rank of major general in January 1943 and becoming a Hero of the Soviet Union on April 19, 1945. He was replaced by Col. Aleksandr Georgievich Kudryavtsev, who had taken command of the 386th Rifle Regiment from Colonel Starukhin when the division was formed and had also served as the division's deputy commander; he was returning to the front following a hospitalization. He would be promoted to major general on October 14.

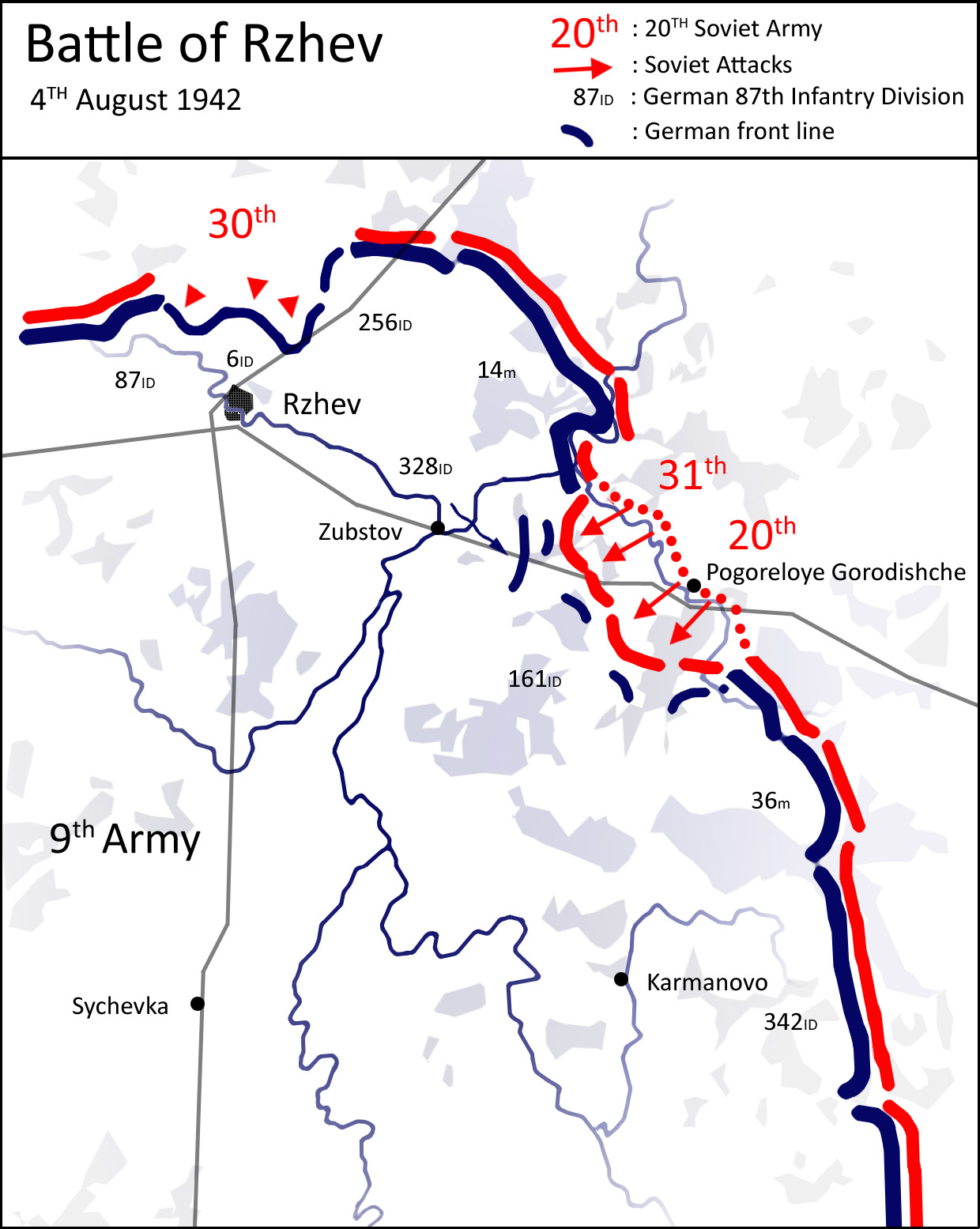
Attack of 30th Army, August 4

The 178th was in 30th Army during the First Rzhev–Sychyovka Offensive Operation. On August 5 the STAVKA placed General Zhukov in overall command of the operation, which had begun several days earlier. Zhukov proposed to take Rzhev as soon as August 9 through a double envelopment by 30th and 31st Armies. In the event there were no real successes on this sector of the front until August 20, when elements of 30th Army finally cleared the village of Polunino and closed on the eastern outskirts of Rzhev. Over the following days further efforts were made to break into the town, but these were unsuccessful. By the beginning of September the 178th had been moved to 39th Army when 30th Army was reassigned to Western Front.

=== Operation Mars ===
Maj. Gen. A. I. Zygin was in command of 39th Army in November; the Army was deployed at the northernmost tip of the Rzhev salient, around the village of Molodoi Tud and the small river of the same name. In the planning for Operation Mars the main weight of the attack was to come from Western Front's 20th Army and Kalinin Front's 41st Army to pinch off the main body of 9th Army north of Sychyovka. 39th Army's task was largely diversionary in nature, intended to draw German reserves, but if successful it would reach and cut the Rzhev–Olenino road and railroad.

Prior to the offensive the 178th was deployed on the Army's left (east) flank. Kudryavtsev had his 386th Regiment on the right, the 709th in the center, and the 693rd on the left. The 709th had the 136th Rifle Brigade and three tank regiments in support on its sector, with the 101st Rifle Brigade in reserve. While the main attack was to be carried out by the 373rd, 135th, and 158th Rifle Divisions and supporting units across the Molodoi Tud River and due south to the village of Urdom, Zygin could see the possibility of a westerly thrust by the 178th to the same village, meeting up with the 186th Rifle Division and 100th Rifle Brigade advancing eastward, cutting off the 206th Infantry Division. The 386th Regiment and the 709th, with its supporting units, were facing the 413th Infantry Regiment of that division.

The offensive began on November 24. The river, although narrow, had high banks and was a considerable obstacle, especially to vehicles. As well, the German fortifications were extensive, and the 14th Motorized Division was known to be in reserve between Olenino and Rzhev. However, the defenders were thinly spread. On the first day the infantry of the main force crossed the frozen Molodoi Tud, but were driven back by heavy German fire before their supporting armor could find crossing points. The attack was a failure, largely due to an ineffective artillery preparation. However, the assault by 136th Brigade and 709th Regiment, with two tank regiments, overran the German forward defenses and advanced 4km to the outskirts of the village of Trushkovo, where it was halted by the meagre reserves of 413th Regiment. This thrust also threatened the left flank of the adjacent 251st Infantry Division, which was in heavy combat with elements of 30th Army. While XXIII Corps had been largely successful in the center, the flank attacks absorbed most of the available reserves. The 11th Grenadier Regiment of 14th Motorized was brought up to reinforce the right flank.

General Zygin requested permission from the commander of Kalinin Front, Col. Gen. M. A. Purkayev, to shift his forces to concentrate on the successful attacks on the flanks. Purkayev, who saw the mission of 39th Army as diversionary, insisted that the main attack be renewed, in order to maintain maximum pressure. Late that evening, Zygin received a report from a deep reconnaissance detachment that, in addition to 14th Motorized, the 5th Panzer Division was moving up to his sector, indicating the Purkayev's design was succeeding. On November 25 the visibility had improved and the Army's artillery preparation was more effective, being joined by airstrikes. Several German strongpoints that had stalled the advance the day before were suppressed, the river line was breached, and up to 2km were gained. The 136th Brigade and supporting tanks pushed west toward Zaitsevo, but could not overcome the resistance of the garrison of Trushkovo. By dusk, German reinforcements were gathering on the flanks of the penetration as Zygin attempted to advance his reserve 101st Rifle Brigade and 46th Mechanized Brigade to consolidate the gains. XXIII Corps was still holding a bridgehead over the river at the village of Molodoi Tud itself, but the battalions there were warned to prepare to withdraw.

Throughout the next day the 11th Grenadier Regiment helped the 413th Regiment to hold on to Trushkovo while also regrouping to launch counterattacks against the penetrations. Overall, Zygin's orders to attack along the line forced XXIII Corps to plug gaps everywhere as well, and with the introduction of Red Army reserves it became apparent that not all the gaps could be plugged. Early on November 27, 39th Army's main force resumed its advance, with second echelon regiments committed in the afternoon. XXIII Corps issued a series of withdrawal orders. The 386th Regiment, at the confluence of the Molodoi Tud and Volga rivers, on a hitherto quiet sector, crossed both and joined the advance. While under heavy pressure, the German forces managed to establish a line running east from Malye Bredniki. The Corps commander was hoping that elements of Großdeutschland Division would be able to stabilise the situation on his right flank, as they had already done on the left. However, this division was now urgently needed on the Luchesa River sector to the south.

A further artillery preparation began around noon the following day, and the main force began a battle that stretched into November 29, but failed to reach Urdom. Zhukov and Purkayev gave Zygin permission to commit the 348th Rifle Division from reserve to take this objective. A further effort the next day finally resulted in success, with the help of several KV-1 tanks which systematically destroyed bunkers and pillboxes. While Urdom was taken the defense line as a whole still held. On December 3, the 136th Brigade and 46th Mechanized attacked again toward Zaitsevo. This was beaten off, at heavy cost to both sides. By now it was clear that Operation Mars was a failure, but the Molodoi Tud sector represented Zhukov's only success. In an effort to expand on this a new plan involving 22nd, 39th and 30th Armies was to begin on December 7. This was preceded by a diversionary effort by elements of the 178th south of Gliadovo on December 4. This, and further attacks on the next two days, made only minor gains, and Mars was finally shut down on December 20.

=== Operation Büffel ===
The OKH finally decided to evacuate the Rzhev salient on February 28, 1943, with the withdrawal to begin at 1900 hours the following day. The STAVKA was taken unaware, and 39th Army began its pursuit at 0830 on March 2. Orders were issued to pick up the pace at 1715 that afternoon, "according to our offensive plan", which appears to indicate that a new offensive was in the works. On March 4, Olenino was liberated. The withdrawal had been carefully planned, and the advance was slowed by rearguards, intermediate defensive lines, minefields, and eventually the spring rasputitsa, which affected both sides. By March 22 the retreating forces reached a prepared line along the base of the former salient from Dukhovshchina through Dorogobuzh to Spas-Demensk. 39th Army found itself on the Dukhovshchina sector. As it closed up it was short of all supplies, especially artillery and ammunition, and on March 24 Kalinin Front went over to the defense. These lines would hold until August. In July the 178th was assigned to the 83rd Rifle Corps, still in 39th Army.

== Operation Suvorov ==
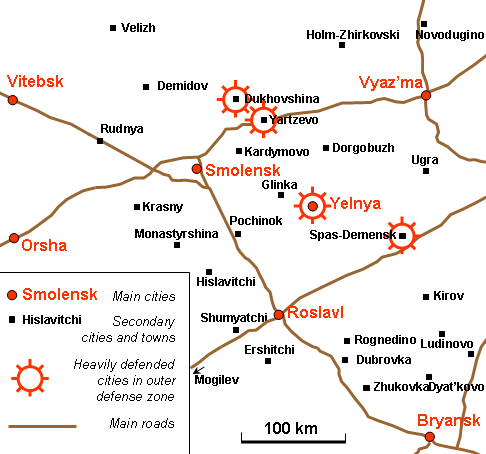
General layout of the Smolensk region during the battle. Note location of Dukhovshchina.

Kalinin and Western Fronts joined the Red Army's summer offensive on August 6. Due to the relative importance of the earlier battles around Kursk, both Fronts were constrained for supplies, particularly fuel and artillery ammunition, which would be felt during the operation. 39th Army began with a series of probing attacks of German 4th Army's XXVII Army Corps, but the Army's commander, Gen. G. Heinrici, dismissed this as the feint it was. As a result of this and other such attacks, none of which were successful, all tactical surprise was lost. On the first several days of the offensive, Kalinin Front, now under command of Col. Gen. A. I. Yeryomenko, made a minimal effort. It began its main attack at 0730 hours on August 13, attacking XXVII Corps 8km northeast of Dukhovshchina, led by five divisions of 83rd Corps and 2nd Guards Rifle Corps, backed by two tank brigades, two tank regiments, and two sapper brigades. 43rd Army provided support on the right. XXVII Corps was assigned a 40km-wide front held by three divisions and a fourth in reserve. All of these were at roughly half their authorized strength, but their Barbarossa-Stellung line consisted of three full lines of trenches sited on heavily wooded high ground.

The ammunition supply limited Yeryomenko to a 35-minute artillery preparation, which mostly failed to suppress the defenses. In the first hours, 2nd Guards Corps was able to penetrate the first trench line south of Spas-Ugly and overrun a German battalion. But overall the Army's shock groups gained at most 1,500m before being halted by counterattacks. PaK 40 antitank guns destroyed or disabled 45 of the supporting tanks in the first two days of battle. On the second day, heavy air attacks disrupted several of 39th Army's formations, and ground reinforcements began arriving, including a battalion of Nashorn tank destroyers. Finally, the 25th Panzergrenadier Division arrived, which allowed XXVII Corps to stabilize its line. 39th Army gained about 3km of ground in four days of heavy fighting, at substantial cost, without reaching any objectives. Kalinin Front had taken some 10,000 casualties to this point, but German casualties had also been heavy, especially to the infantry. On August 21 the overall offensive by both Fronts was suspended due to losses, supply shortages, and a period of rainy weather. The 18th Panzer Division was transferred to backstop XXVII Corps, but it had only 1,200 infantry and 13 tanks.

Kalinin Front resumed the offensive on August 25. 39th Army was reinforced with the 5th Guards Rifle Corps, but this force was only able to advance 1,000m on a 3km front in five days of fighting. Yeryomenko was stymied. He wrote in his memoirs:

I was seriously worried that the offensive was fading, and the task was not completed, although we did not lack people. The main cause of our failure was the inability of the artillery to destroy the enemy's strongly fortified positions. The essence of the matter was not in the number of barrels of artillery, but in the number of shells.

Despite this, he was ordered to go on attacking. While Western Front made more substantial gains, Suvorov was again suspended on September 7.

When it resumed on September 14, XXVII Corps was attempting to hold a sector 81km-wide with five divisions containing just 10,000 troops in total. The Corps commander expected the main thrust to come from east of Dukhovshchina, where he deployed the 25th Panzergrenadiers backed by 1st SS Infantry Brigade. Yeryomenko shook up his command, in part by replacing General Zygin with Lt. Gen. N. E. Berzarin. Having learned of the arrival of 1st SS he briefly shifted his main effort to his 43rd Army to the northwest, where the German lines were even more thinly held, and scored a minor success. After a 20-minute artillery preparation the 39th Army struck near Spas-Ugly with four divisions and smashed a German regiment, breaching the line. By 1000 hours the conditions were favorable for Yeryomenko to commit his mobile forces, which collapsed and routed what remained of 52nd Infantry Division. Supporting attacks by 83rd Corps pinned 25th Panzergrenadier in place but failed to gain any ground. With Soviet armor roaming in its rear the XXVII Corps was forced to commit the weak 18th Panzer, which simply didn't have the strength to deal with the crisis.

On September 15, Berzarin expanded his penetration and mopped up bypassed pockets. After hanging on as long as possible XXVII Corps began to retreat to the Hubertus-I-Stellung to the rear. As front-line resistance evaporated the two Armies of Kalinin Front took up the pursuit. 2nd Guards Corps and the mobile group pushed south toward Dukhovshchina against weak rearguards. It was now clear that Hubertus-I was untenable, and the town was evacuated overnight on September 16/17. Two days later, as part of the honors awarded for this victory, the 178th was granted the unique honorific "Kulagin" for its seizure of the Kulagin Heights. Smolensk was liberated by units of Western Front on September 25, as Army Group Center fell back to the promised refuge of the Panther Line behind the Dniepr River. However, the 178th had already left the fighting front on September 17, moving to the reserves of Kalinin Front before being reassigned to 3rd Shock Army farther west on September 27.

== Battle of Nevel ==
The 178th was assigned a long sector on the Army's right (north) flank west of Velikiye Luki and just east of Novosokolniki; these lines had been fixed since January. In its new positions the division, with its Army, was facing the XXXXIII Army Corps of Army Group North's 16th Army, just taken over from Army Group Center. This was the Army's southernmost Corps and formed the link with 3rd Panzer Army of Army Group Center east of Nevel. Yeryomenko had identified this as a weak point, especially as the II Luftwaffe Field Corps was on the extreme left of 3rd Panzer. As with most rifle divisions at this time, after months of heavy combat, the 178th had a strength of between 5,000 and 6,000 personnel. Yeryomenko planned the attack on Nevel as a supporting operation for his Front's wider offensive towards Vitebsk:

While planning the Nevel operation, we anticipated supporting the general front operation along the Vitebsk axis and also creating conditions conducive for developing success southward toward Gorodok and also northward and northwestward to seize the Novosokolniki center of resistance... Furthermore, the attack on Nevel diverted considerable German forces, and its success would disrupt the entire enemy communications system... This would prevent the enemy from maneuvering from the north to support his Vitebsk grouping.

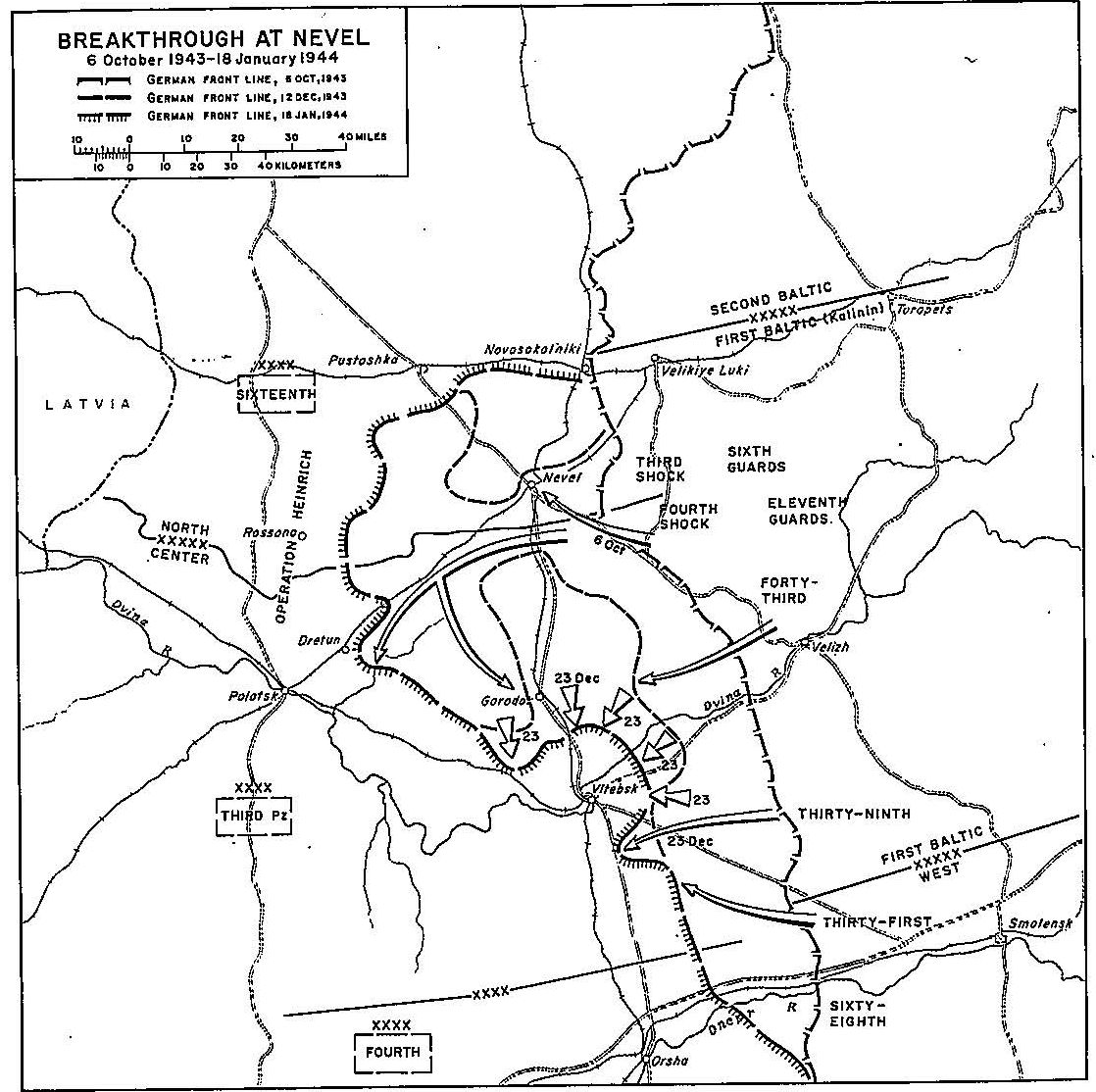
Map of Battle of Nevel (October 1943 - January 1944). Note the position of Novosokolniki.

The offensive began at 0500 hours on October 6 with a reconnaissance-in-force, followed by a 90-minute artillery preparation at 0840 hours and airstrikes by 21st Assault Aviation Regiment. 3rd Shock went over to the attack at 1000 hours on the Zhigary-Shliapy sector, precisely at the boundary between the two German army groups. 28th Rifle Division led the assault in the first echelon followed closely by an exploitation echelon consisting of the 21st Guards Rifle Division and the 78th Tank Brigade with 54 tanks. The assaulting force struck and demolished the 2nd Luftwaffe Field Division. In addition, the right flank of 263rd Infantry Division was badly smashed. The 78th Tanks, carrying troops of 21st Guards with more mounted on trucks, along with the 163rd Antitank and 827th Howitzer Artillery Regiments, entered the gap and rapidly drove to the west and liberated Nevel from the march. At the same time the 4th Shock Army, deployed on 3rd Shock's left (south) flank, also launched an attack towards Gorodok, which created another deep penetration.

=== Battles for Novosokolniki ===
While German efforts to retake Nevel came to nothing, by October 10 German reserves had contained the penetration, creating a situation where the two Soviet armies were operating within a "bottle", with only the original gap created on October 6 available for supplies and reinforcements. The obvious German move was to close the gap, but this required attacking from two vulnerable salients of their own. Such an effort was in the works as early as October 10, but was called off by Hitler on October 14 as he believed the three divisions available were insufficient. Also on October 10, General Kudryavtsev left the 178th to take command of the 357th Division, while Maj. Gen. Aleksandr Lvovich Kronik was transferred from the latter to the former. Kudryavtsev would lead the 357th until April, 1948, and would retire in 1950. Kronik had served on the staff of 29th Army from August 1941 until February 1942 when he took over the 357th.

With most of 3rd Shock fighting inside the "bottle" the 178th was transferred to 2nd Baltic Front's 22nd Army. On October 18 the division, along with the 7th and 249th Estonian Rifle Divisions of 8th Estonian Rifle Corps, launched the first of several assaults on Novosokolniki, which was at the base of the northern German salient, but this failed in the face of extensive fortifications. By the beginning of November the 178th had moved to 11th Guards Army, joining the 16th Guards Rifle Corps.

On November 2, 3rd Shock Army began a new offensive from within the "bottle" toward Pustoshka, which soon reached the approaches to that town. This put Army Group North in a bind, especially with the arrival of 6th Guards Army from Ukraine, which began attacking I Army Corps in the lake region northeast of Nevel on November 10. This was intended to widen the gap by eroding the tip of the northern salient, but progress was slow. On November 12 the STAVKA ordered 2nd Baltic Front to dig in at its present positions and "[p]rotect Nevel' especially reliably". Around November 20, 11th Guards Army left the Front, and the 178th returned to 22nd Army as a separate division.

In the middle of December the chief of staff of the Front met Army Gen. A. I. Antonov, chief of the Red Army's General Staff, to begin planning future operations. By this time the German salient north of Nevel was a sort of oblong sack, with Novosokolniki still at the eastern end of its base. The Front was first to encircle and destroy the German forces in the sack, then advance toward Idritsa and north of Novosokolniki to support the upcoming offensive in front of Leningrad. Before this could begin, on December 29 Army Group North began a planned withdrawal from the salient. Taken by surprise, the Soviet forces began a hasty pursuit similar to that in March when Rzhev was evacuated, with similar results. By January 6, 1944, the new German defensive line ran from Idritsa to south of Pustoshka to Novosokolniki northward to Lake Ilmen. On January 29 the 178th managed to finally liberate Novosokolniki after more than a year of fighting between the two sides on its outskirts, and on February 3 it was awarded the Order of the Red Banner.

== Continuation War ==
On March 30 the 178th was removed to the Reserve of the Supreme High Command for rebuilding. It was moved north and became part of 21st Army's 97th Rifle Corps in Leningrad Front on April 28. It reentered the fighting front on May 8.

The Leningrad–Novgorod offensive in January/February had driven Army Group North from the gates of Leningrad, but Finland continued to hold the part of the Karelian Isthmus that it had retaken in 1941. The STAVKA, now with an abundance of resources, set a priority on defeating the Finnish forces in Karelia, reoccupying the territory taken after the Winter War, possibly occupying Helsinki, but in any case driving Finland out of the war. The USSR officially published its peace terms on February 28, but these were rejected on March 8. Although negotiations continued, the STAVKA began planning for operations in May.

At this time the line from Lake Ladoga to the Gulf of Finland was held by 23rd Army. It faced the six infantry and one armored divisions of the Finnish III and IV Army Corps, a total of roughly 250,000 personnel. 23rd Army had numerical superiority, especially in equipment, but also faced heavy fortifications and difficult terrain. In order to provide Army Gen. L. A. Govorov, the commander of the Front, with an overwhelming force to guarantee success, on April 28 the headquarters of 21st Army, under Lt. Gen. D. N. Gusev, arrived from the Reserve of the Supreme High Command, soon followed by the men and equipment of his 97th and 124th Rifle Corps. 97th Corps, under command of Maj. Gen. M. M. Busarov, comprised the 178th, 358th, and 381st Rifle Divisions.

=== Vyborg–Petrozavodsk Offensive ===
In the plan for the offensive, 97th Corps was deployed on the right flank of its Army, and would be handed off to 23rd Army after the crossing of the Sestra River. The 358th and 381st were in the Corps first echelon, on a front of 9.5km. The Army was to attack in the direction of Vyborg. On the evening of June 9 the first echelon rifle corps of 21st Army fired a 15-minute artillery preparation, followed by a reconnaissance-in-force to assess the damage. The offensive proper began at 0820 hours on June 10, following a 140-minute artillery onslaught. 97th Corps attacked towards Kallelovo and penetrated the forward Finnish defenses, but only advanced 5km, reaching the south bank of the Sestra by the end of the day. Meanwhile, the Finns were ordered to pull back to their second line. For the next day, the Corps was ordered to continue the advance on Kallelovo, and at 1500 hours the handover to 23rd Army took place. By day's end the 97th and 98th Rifle Corps reached the Termolovo-Khirelia line. On June 12, 97th Corps enveloped Termolovo from the west to northeast, but the pace of the advance was slowing, and it became clear that a regrouping would be necessary before tackling that second line. The 178th, with its Corps, was withdrawn to the Front reserve for a brief rest and refitting.

Between June 14–17 the two Soviet armies penetrated the second Finnish defense line and were in pursuit towards the third. The high command still considered that progress was too slow, and orders emanated from Moscow exhorting them on to Vyborg. To this end, the rested 97th Corps was again subordinated to 21st Army on the morning of the 18th and, supported by the 1st and 152nd Tank Brigades, prepared to take the lead in breaking the third line. The Corps was to penetrate between Summa and Markki at the boundary of the 4th Infantry Division and 3rd Infantry Brigade, advance along the Summa-Vyborg road to Khumola, and capture a railroad junction south of the city. 72nd Rifle Division would cover the Corps' left flank while, farther left, the 110th Rifle Corps would also attack near Summa.

The assault, backed by massive artillery support, began early on June 19 and gained almost immediate success. Overall, the forces of 21st Army ripped a 70km-wide gap in the Finnish defenses from Muola to the Gulf of Finland, and advanced as much as 14km during 18 hours of bitter fighting against determined but confused resistance. 97th Corps drove north on the Vyborg road, smashing the Finnish IV Army Corps in the process; at the end of the day 152nd Tank Brigade was attacking Autiokorpela. The plan for the next day called for 97th Corps to advance along the rail line and then envelop Vyborg's defenses from the northeast. When the advance began in the morning the Soviets soon learned that the Finns had abandoned the city overnight. All three of the 178th's rifle regiments, the 386th (Lt. Colonel Savchenko, Vasilii Grigorevich), 693rd (Major Galkin, Aleksandr Petrovich), and 709th (Major Kostov, Boris Aleksandrovich) were awarded "Vyborg" as an honorific.

== Courland Pocket ==
Shortly after the victory at Vyborg the 178th was moved back to the second echelon of 21st Army to construct defensive positions. On July 26 General Kronik left the division to briefly take the position of deputy commander of 40th Rifle Corps; he would later lead the 343rd Rifle Division into the postwar. He was replaced by Col. Iosif Ivanovich Lebedinskii, who would remain in command for the duration. This officer had previously led the 162nd Naval Rifle Brigade in the defense of Leningrad before attending courses at the Voroshilov Academy. At about the same time the division was reassigned to 108th Rifle Corps, still in 21st Army. Under this command it returned to Vyborg and took up defensive positions. Later in August it returned to 97th Corps, and in September was moved, with its Corps, to 59th Army, still in Leningrad Front. At the end of November the Corps became part of 23rd Army, and the 178th remained under these commands until the German surrender. In the spring of 1945 it moved into Latvia, eventually to the vicinity of Liepāja. On the evening of May 9, Army Group Courland surrendered, and for most of the remainder of the month the 178th was involved in taking the surrender of German troops.

== Postwar ==
The men and women of the division shared the full title of 178th Rifle, Kugalin, Order of the Red Banner Division. (Russian: 178-я стрелковая Кулагинская Краснознамённая дивизия.) In August the 97th Corps was moved to the newly-formed Gorkii Military District, where the 178th was stationed at Dzerzhinsk. It was disbanded there in April 1946.
