= 373rd Rifle Division =

WW2 Soviet Red Army formation

- Active: 1941 - 1946
- Country: Soviet Union
- Branch: Red Army
- Type: Division
- Role: Infantry
- Engagements: Battle of Moscow; Battles of Rzhev; Sychyovka-Vyazma Offensive; Operation Seydlitz; Operation Mars; Belgorod-Kharkov Offensive Operation; Battle of the Dniepr; Battle of Cherkassy; Battle of the Korsun–Cherkassy Pocket; Uman–Botoșani Offensive; First Jassy-Kishinev Offensive; Second Jassy-Kishenev Offensive; Vistula-Oder Offensive; Lower Silesian Offensive; Berlin Strategic Offensive Operation; Prague Offensive
- Decorations: Order of the Red Banner; Order of Suvorov; Order of Kutuzov
- Battle honours: Mirgorod

Commanders
- Notable commanders: Lt. Col. Vasilii Ivanovich Khmylyov; Maj. Gen. Kuzma Ivanovich Sazonov

The 373rd Rifle Division was raised in 1941 as an infantry division of the Red Army, and served for the duration of the Great Patriotic War in that role. It began forming in August 1941 in the Urals Military District. It was moved to the front northwest of Moscow while still trying to complete its training and went straight into action in mid-December during the winter counteroffensive. Until May 1943, it was involved in the bloody fighting around the Rzhev salient. After a period in reserve for rebuilding, the division's combat path shifted southward when it was assigned to 52nd Army, where it remained for the duration of the war. It won a battle honor in eastern Ukraine, then fought across the Dniepr River late that year, and was awarded the Order of the Red Banner for its successes. Following this it advanced through western Ukraine in the spring of 1944, then into Romania in the summer, where it played a major role in the second encirclement and destruction of the German 6th Army. After again moving to the reserves the division shifted northwards with its Army to join 1st Ukrainian Front, fighting through Poland, eastern Germany and into Czechoslovakia. By then the 373rd had compiled an enviable record, and went on to serve briefly into the postwar era.

== Formation ==
The division began forming in August, 1941 in the Urals Military District at Chebarkul in the Chelyabinsk Oblast, based on the first wartime shtat (table of organization and equipment) for rifle divisions, with an authorized strength of 10,859 personnel. Its order of battle was as follows:

- 1235th Rifle Regiment
- 1237th Rifle Regiment
- 1239th Rifle Regiment
- 931st Artillery Regiment
- 243rd Antitank Battalion (added in early 1942)
- 262nd Antiaircraft Battery (until January 10, 1943)
- 430th Reconnaissance Company
- 439th (later 648th) Sapper Battalion
- 619th (later 819th) Signal Battalion (later 435th Signal Company)
- 453rd Medical/Sanitation Battalion
- 446th Chemical Protection (Anti-gas) Company
- 483rd Motor Transport Company
- 222nd Field Bakery
- 791st Divisional Veterinary Hospital
- 50840th (later 1442nd) Field Postal Station
- 699th (later 741st) Field Office of the State Bank

Lt. Col. Vasilii Ivanovich Khmylyov was not assigned to command of the division until September 19, and he would remain in command until August 11, 1942. In November the division was assigned to the 39th Army, which was forming in the Arkhangelsk Military District, and began moving by rail to join this command while it was still short of training and equipment. The Army consolidated in the Torzhok area, and in late December it was assigned to Kalinin Front. Beginning on January 8, 1942, 39th Army took part in the Sychevka-Vyasma Offensive Operation, which was planned "to encircle, and then capture or destroy the enemy's entire Mozhaisk - Gzhatsk - Vyasma grouping", that is, what later became known as the Rzhev salient.

== Battles for Rzhev ==
During the January advance, 39th Army bypassed north of Rzhev itself in an effort to get behind the city and encircle the forces of German 9th Army holding there. It advanced into a gap between Bely and Olenino and by the third week of the month was fighting for Sychevka from the west, even taking the town's railway station. 29th Army and the 11th Cavalry Corps also entered the gap, but despite bitter fighting and reinforcements from 39th Army, the 29th was unable to liberate Rzhev. On January 23, a German counterattack from Olenino and Rzhev constricted the gap, worsening an already critical supply situation for the two Armies. A further attack on February 5 cut the 29th off from the 39th. Despite urgent efforts, including paratroop operations, the German cordon could not be pierced, and the survivors of 29th Army trickled through to the lines of the 39th and 30th Armies during the rest of the month.

As of February 28 the 373rd was recorded as having a total of 2,274 personnel, 21 percent of its authorized strength. During the following months 39th Army held its positions, always under severe supply constraints, especially during the spring rasputitsa. In May and June, Army Group Center began planning a limited offensive to eliminate the smaller Soviet salients to its rear. Operation Seydlitz began on July 2, and faced heavy resistance, but by July 5 the Army's commander, Lt. Gen. I. I. Maslennikov, had decided to withdraw from the salient. On July 9, the escape corridor was more-or-less sealed, and the remaining troops of 39th Army began emerging much as had the men of the 29th Army months earlier. During July, 39th Army recorded 23,647 total personnel losses, including 22,749 missing-in-action. The remnants of the 373rd were withdrawn for reforming.

As of August 1, 39th Army consisted of only "Cavalry Detachment Stepanov" and the cadre of the 373rd, and by September 1 the division was in the reserves of Kalinin Front. Due to this rebuilding, the 373rd was unavailable for the First Rzhev–Sychyovka Offensive Operation. On August 12, Lt. Colonel Khmylyov was replaced in command by Lt. Col. Matveii Sergeevich Yeroshkin, but on September 11 he was in turn replaced by Col. Kuzma Ivanovich Sazonov, who would be promoted to the rank of major general on September 13, 1944, and would remain in command for the duration of the war. The division returned to active operations, back in 39th Army, in time for the Second Rzhev–Sychyovka Offensive Operation, also known as Operation Mars.

=== Operation Mars ===
By late November, 39th Army held positions at the northern apex of the salient, and the 373rd had the 1235th and 1237th Rifle Regiments north of the village of Kazakovo, while the 1239th faced the east side of the German bridgehead at the town of Molodoi Tud. The Army, now under command of Maj. Gen. A. I. Zygin, was on a secondary sector, with the mission to "attack and seize the high road running from Molodoi Tud to Rzhev... and then, in cooperation with 22nd Army... seize the key city of Olenino." The terrain in the sector was difficult, and the German forces had heavily fortified the south bank of the Molodoi Tud River, but in mitigation they had only one division, the 206th, in the line, although 14th Motorized Division was known to be in reserve. Zygin saw his immediate objective as the town of Urdom, which would encircle the 206th. He planned to attack across the river with the 158th, 135th, and 373rd Rifle Divisions after a one-hour artillery preparation, supported by the 81st and 28th Tank Brigades. The 348th Rifle Division was in reserve.

The attack began at 1000 hours on November 25, but it quickly became apparent that the artillery had failed to destroy or suppress many of the German strongpoints, and the 373rd, along with the 158th and 135th, were forced to retreat to the north bank. Zygin ordered them to regroup to renew the attack the next day. Meanwhile, the forces on 39th Army's flanks gained some successes and seemed to be making the German position untenable until the arrival of elements of the Panzer-Grenadier-Division Großdeutschland at 1800 hours partly restored the situation. Early on the morning of November 26 Zygin ordered Colonel Sazonov to narrow his attack sector and be prepared to commit his second echelon regiment as soon as the lead regiment was across the Molodoi Tud. A slightly stronger artillery preparation was laid on, with much improved observation as the weather cleared, which also allowed air support. During the day the 1237th Rifle Regiment established itself on the south bank, being joined by the 1235th Regiment on the next day and driving the German forces from the village of Malye Bredniki. On the same day the 1239th Regiment assisted in the liberation of the town of Molodai Tud.

On November 28, 39th Army continued to assail the second-line positions of the 206th Infantry. Following yet another artillery preparation the 373rd took Briukhanovo, but this did not breach the German line. By nightfall on the 29th, although small groups of Soviet tanks and infantry had approached the key position at Urdom, they had all been repulsed with heavy losses, in large part due to further intervention by Großdeutschland. In an overnight conference, Colonel Sazonov, Colonel Malygin of the 81st Tank Brigade, and Colonel Kovalenko of the 135th Rifle Division, planned a concerted attack on Urdom, to begin the next morning. By this time the two divisions had lost about half of their men. Given these losses, General Zygin got approval to release the 348th Rifle Division from reserve into the attack. Under the new plan, while the 135th and 348th struck the German defenses on either side of the town, one regiment of the 373rd, with Malygin's remaining tanks, would attempt to envelop it. The battle on November 30 lasted all day, but was successful. A handful of remaining KV-1 tanks reached the town's outskirts and systematically reduced the German pillboxes. By nightfall Urdom had been liberated, but the defenders still held out along the road east and west of the ruined town and their overall defense line was still intact. Moreover, 39th Army had taken such severe losses that it would have to pause for regrouping and reinforcements.

39th Army was ordered to return to the offensive on December 8 as the offensive was collapsing on other sectors. However, the 373rd had been redeployed westward, to positions directly south of Molodoi Tud, and played little role in this renewed fighting. In a STAVKA directive (No. 11029) of January 4, 1943, the chief of staff of Kalinin Front was notified of several shortcomings in the organization of its defenses, including the use of ski troops:

"In battle, the ski battalions are being used as regular line subunits, as a result of which they are suffering heavy losses, while in the 373rd Rifle Division, the ski battalion fully ceased to exist after several combat actions."

== Into Ukraine ==
In February, the division was moved to 4th Shock Army, and then in March to 43rd Army, both still in Kalinin Front. In May the 373rd was removed to the Reserve of the Supreme High Command for a substantial rebuilding, after which it was shipped south to join the 52nd Army in Steppe Front. The division would remain in this Army for the duration of the war. From Steppe Front the 52nd would be moved to Voronezh Front, and would take part in the Belgorod-Kharkov Offensive Operation under that command. As of September 1 the division was assigned to the 78th Rifle Corps.

On September 18, the division took part in the liberation of Mirgorod, and was recognized as follows:

"MIRGOROD... 373rd Rifle Division (Col. Kuzma Ivanovich Sazonov)... By order of the Supreme High Command the 93rd Rifle Division and the 373rd Rifle Division are awarded the name Mirgorod."

By the end of the month 52nd Army had reached the Dniepr River, and its 254th Rifle Division soon forced a crossing in the Kreshchatik area. During October the Army was moved back to Steppe Front, which became 2nd Ukrainian Front on October 20. As of November 1, the 373rd was the only division in its Corps, and was defending a sector of more than 110 km on the east bank from the mouth of the Dolgun River to Chigurin Dubrova.

=== Battle of Cherkassy ===
Following the liberation of Kiev on November 6, 1st Ukrainian Front was ordered to halt its offensive on November 12. In conjunction with this, 52nd Army, on that Front's left (south) flank, had been ordered to launch an operation to liberate the west bank city of Cherkassy, as well as the important rail junction of Smela, beginning on November 13. At this time the Army had only three rifle divisions under command, with the 254th and 294th in the Kreshchatik bridgehead. The Army was being reinforced, and by this time the divisions mustered 6,000 to 6,300 personnel each. The Army also had crossing means (boats, ferries and pontoons) enough to carry 300–400 men, with their weapons, in one trip, with more in reserve. 52nd Army faced the German 57th, 332nd, 72nd and 167th Infantry Divisions and the 5th SS Panzer Division Wiking, which had very few tanks and was operating as infantry. These divisions had between 4,000-5,000 men each under command. Overall, the terrain, with a large river to cross, much broken and wooded ground, and many inhabited localities, including substantial buildings and factories in the vicinity of Cherkassy, would make this a difficult operation. In the event, what was planned as a two-day offensive stretched on for 31 days.

The 254th Division, experienced in river crossings, had been pulled out of the Kreshchatik bridgehead under cover of darkness. The plan was to have it capture a new bridgehead at Svidovok, northwest of Cherkassy. The 373rd would simultaneously attack across the Dniepr on the secondary axis southeast of the city with the 1239th and 1235th Rifle Regiments, while the 1237th continued to hold the Dniepr line. The division was strong in artillery, with 54 mortars, 44 45mm antitank guns, 8 76mm regimental guns, 19 76mm divisional guns and 12 divisional 122mm howitzers, although there was no artillery preparation, to preserve surprise. The joint attack began at midnight. The 2nd Battalion of the 1239th made a landing north of Dakhnovka and by 0600 hours had pushed forward as much as a kilometre. German tanks and infantry reserves counterattacked and drove the battalion back to the shore, from where it was evacuated after nightfall, having suffered significant losses, including in crossing equipment. The crossing forces of the 1235th's 1st Battalion were contained to an island near the west bank, and was eventually joined there by the 3rd Battalion.

Despite these failures, the 254th Rifle Division had managed to get two regiments across at Svidovok and to hold off the enemy counterattacks. Colonel Sazonov was ordered to cross the 1239th and the 2nd Battalion of the 1235th into this bridgehead the next night. By the end of November 15 this bridgehead was 7 km wide and 5 km deep. However, German reinforcements continued to arrive and tilt the balance of forces in their favor. The battle for the bridgehead went on for several days, as antitank units and the few tanks and self-propelled guns of 52nd Army crossed the river on pontoons, and by the end of November 18 the 373rd had taken Vasilitsa and Sosnovka, and the bridgehead had been expanded to 16 km in width and nine km in depth.

By the morning of November 20, the strategic situation indicated that the enemy would be receiving new reserves, so to retain offensive momentum the Army headquarters ordered a new effort to capture the city. The division was to attack with the 1239th Regiment from the Sosnovka area towards the northwestern outskirts of Cherkassy, while the two battalions of the 1235th crossed from the island they occupied to attack the eastern outskirts. This attack was organized hastily, and the Soviet forces had no advantage in manpower. In the early going the 1239th captured the Shevchenko Collective Farm. This was followed by heavy counterattacks, and by nightfall the Regiment, along with the rest of the Army's forces, had to fall back to their jumping-off positions. By now the 1239th in particular was significantly under strength. A further attack on the city overnight on November 21–22 was also unsuccessful. On November 24 the Army finally received reinforcements, with the 7th Guards Airborne Division crossing into the bridgehead, and the 62nd Guards Rifle Division moving up to join 78th Corps after receiving replacements.

A new assault began at 0600 hours on November 26, following a 50-minute artillery preparation. By this time the 1239th Regiment had been subordinated to 294th Division, while the 1235th was to again attack from the island in the direction of the sugar factory in the southeastern part of the city. By 1100 hours on November 28 the German forces in Cherkassy were surrounded, but rejected an ultimatum to surrender. At the end of the day the 1235th Regiment was still fighting in the vicinity of the sugar factory. The fighting in the city and its approaches continued the next day, at which time it was learned from prisoner interrogations that the 3rd Panzer Division and other reinforcements had arrived at Smela to restore contact with the Cherkassy garrison.

The counteroffensive began at 0900 hours on November 30. It fell mainly on 7th Guards Airborne, whose external encirclement front was soon penetrated, and counterblows were unsuccessful. The German attack continued on December 1 and managed to break through to the garrison, in the process encircling two regiments of the 7th Guards. 52nd Army scraped up all possible reserves and on the morning of December 4 reestablished contact with one regiment. Meanwhile the 373rd's 1235th Regiment was engaged in further fighting around the sugar factory to tie down enemy forces. By December 5 the rest of the airborne troops escaped encirclement and the situation stabilized.

The final attack to clear Cherkassy began at 0830 hours on December 9, following an artillery preparation better organized than previous efforts. The 1239th Regiment was fighting in the vicinity of the railway station near the river and repelled several German counterattacks. The 1235th Regiment, now aided by elements of the 1237th, finally pushed past the sugar factory. A regrouping was carried out overnight on December 12/13. During the final push on the 13th the 1235th and one battalion of the 1237th beat off counterattacks and captured three city blocks. At this time the German command realized its position in the city was untenable and ordered its troops to pull out towards Smela, which was not liberated until February 3, 1944. On December 14, the division was recognized for its general service, especially in regard to the fighting around Cherkassy, with the award of the Order of the Red Banner.

== Jassy-Kishinev Offensives ==
Following the successful conclusion of the Battle of the Korsun–Cherkassy Pocket, 52nd Army joined the general advance through western Ukraine towards the Dniestr River. As of April 1, 1944, the 373rd was still in 78th Rifle Corps, which also commanded the 252nd and 303rd Rifle Divisions. On April 8 the division was further honored with the award of the Order of Suvorov, 2nd Degree, for its part in an assault crossing of the Dniestr and the capture of the Romanian city of Beltsy. By this time the offensive had run to the end of its logistical support given the spring thaw, and the division remained in its positions due north of Iași until late May.

=== Operation Sonja ===
By that time Marshal Konev had devised a new plan for the capture of Iași, which involved the transfer of 27th Guards Rifle Corps from 7th Guards Army, to the west, into positions behind 73rd Rifle Corps, which now included the 373rd. All of this was preempted on May 30, when German 8th Army launched a limited offensive north of the city. Operation Sonja began with a strong aviation and artillery preparation against the rifle divisions of 52nd Army, followed by attacks from tanks and infantry. Battlegroups of the 23rd and 24th Panzer Divisions moved northwards on both sides of the Enache Forest and after running a gauntlet of Soviet artillery fire penetrated the defenses at the junction between the 373rd and 294th Rifle Division and lunged forward towards the village of Stanca, some 8 km beyond. The battlegroup of 24th Panzer reached the approaches to Hill 198, which was held by the second echelon rifle regiment of the 373rd. Reinforced by tanks the German force overcame this resistance, wheeled to the northwest, but was halted on the outskirts of Stanca by dug-in Soviet antitank guns and rifles, backed by withdrawing elements of the division. The second battlegroup captured Hill 165, about 2.5 km into the 373rd's defenses, before its supporting elements of the 79th Infantry Division faltered in the face of strong Soviet resistance. Despite this, by 2000 hours the German forces had taken Stanca and the division was driven back to the outskirts of Carpiti. At about this time the 254th Rifle Division was ordered from 52nd Army reserves to reinforce the badly shaken 373rd. By the following day 73rd Corps had regained its balance and the enemy made no further gains. As well, elements of the 6th Tank Army were ordered forward to support 52nd Army and repel the offensive; 5th Mechanized Corps backed the 73rd Corps and restored the situation.

=== Second Jassy-Kishinev Offensive ===
In the buildup to the new summer offensive the 373rd remained in 73rd Rifle Corps but was removed from the front line to the reserve echelon of the Corps. The offensive began in the early morning of August 20 with an artillery preparation of one hour and 40 minutes duration which wreaked significant destruction on the German and Romanian defenses and forces, although some strongpoints remained relatively intact. 52nd Army broke through the Axis defense along a 12 km front and advanced 16 km during the day, forcing the Bahlui River in the process, and by the end of the day was engaged in fighting in the area of the Iași railway station. The 373rd remained in reserve despite its Army not reaching its first day objective, which was the complete occupation of the city.

That task was assigned to 73rd Corps for August 21. During most of the day the 116th Rifle Division was engaged in stubborn fighting for the village of Galata, where enemy reserves were concentrated to hold open an escape route to the south. While the 294th Division with the third battalion of the 223rd Tank Brigade cleared Iași by 1230 hours, the 373rd had to be committed to the fighting for Galata, which was seized by the end of the day. This day's battles used up the slender Axis reserves across the front, as well as any hope of countering new Red Army advances. On the next day the 52nd Army crushed the enemy resistance along the south bank of the Bahlui as a preliminary for an advance on Huși. 73rd Corps was tied up in heavy fighting for an enemy strongpoint referred to as the "Little Fortress" height about 2 km south of Iași which dominated the surrounding terrain. When this was overcome at day's end the Corps continued to move through the night on the paved road to Vaslui.

The ultimate objective for 52nd Army on August 23 was to link up with forces of 3rd Ukrainian Front and complete the encirclement of the Axis' Kishinev group of forces. By this time those forces were in full retreat. During the day the army finished off enemy units that had been scattered by the advance of 18th Tank Corps and by the end of the day 73rd Rifle Corps had reached a line from Șerbotești to Șerbești, but the pocket remained open. The next day the 52nd and the 18th Tank Corps were ordered to seize and hold Huși. During this day Romanian units began dropping out of the fighting. Through the day the 73rd Corps, with tank support, fought for the city against a disorganized but desperate defense. By 1900 hours Huși was taken, and 73rd Corps continued its advance to the south and east to complete the encirclement.

The trapped Kishinev group occupied a pocket of about 60 km by 50 km in area, and would have to seize crossings over the Prut River to escape. While the other forces of 2nd Ukrainian Front began to exploit to the west, 52nd and 4th Guards Armies were assigned to eliminate the encircled group in cooperation with elements of 3rd Ukrainian Front. The Axis force was estimated at between 60,000 - 70,000 men. During August 25, 73rd Corps was in a difficult situation. During the day it was forced to continue fighting in the Husi area with part of its forces while another part was to reach the Prut; meanwhile the 1239th Rifle Regiment was ordered to eliminate enemy remnants in the Curteni area southwest of Husi. German troops, pressed from the north by 48th Rifle Corps, broke into the northeastern outskirts of Husi in regimental strength, backed by four armored cars, but were counterattacked and defeated by elements of the 373rd and 294th Divisions, backed by the 110th Tank Brigade and army artillery. The 1235th and 1237th Rifle Regiments reached the Prut on an 8 km front and linked up with 3rd Ukrainian Front forces. Overall the 52nd Army was unable to create a continuous front along the right bank of the Prut.

Overnight on August 25/26 a composite group of about 10,000 men of the LII Army Corps moved towards Husi and got into fighting with elements of 73rd Corps, with little success. Throughout the day the Corps continued in heavy fighting with an increasingly disorganized enemy. By the end of the day 52nd Army's forces had killed up to 12,000 enemy soldiers and officers and captured more than 8,500. Despite these heavy losses, enemy pressure on 52nd Army grew on August 27 as more of their forces crossed the Prut, almost entirely without vehicles or heavy weapons. By the end of the 28th the 21st Guards and 373rd Divisions had basically cleared the area west of Vutcani. On August 29 the 373rd managed to inflict heavy losses on the German group in the woods southwest of Husi. Overall, 52nd Army claimed up to 6,000 killed and more than 10,000 captured during the day. At day's end two of the division's rifle regiments were on a line from Ruska to just outside Voloseni. From August 30 to September 5 the 52nd Army mopped up the remnants of the Kishinev group, following which it was moved to the Reserve of the Supreme High Command.

== Into Germany ==
In October the 52nd Army was reassigned to 1st Ukrainian Front and the 373rd was moved back to the 78th Rifle Corps. It would fight under these commands for the duration of the war. During the Vistula-Oder Offensive, by January 28, 1945, 52nd Army reached the Oder River on a 60 km front north and south of Breslau with the 73rd and 78th Corps in first echelon, and gained two bridgeheads over the river southeast of the city. Over the following week the Front carried out a complicated regrouping in the Breslau area. On February 1, 78th Corps was preparing for its relief from its bridgehead; German forces noticed the movement during daylight hours and launched an attack which drove the Corps back several kilometres towards the river. At the start of the Lower Silesian Offensive on February 8 the Army made its main attack on the 20-km-wide Luben - Gross Kreidel sector with 48th and 78th Corps, and was backed by the 3rd Guards Tank Army.

The offensive began at 0930 hours, following a 50-minute artillery preparation. 78th Corps, supported by 7th Guards Tank Corps, made moderate progress, advancing 6 km and capturing enemy strongpoints at Muhlredlitz and Merschwitz. On February 9, 78th Corps advanced behind the tanks and overcame weak but unremitting resistance from the 19th Panzer and 408th Infantry Divisions, finally reaching the northern outskirts of Liegnitz. As the advance continued the next day the Corps was forced to deploy its divisions, including the 373rd, facing southwest to cover its Army's left flank along a sector of 40 km from Liegnitz to Rosenthal. This was a potentially dangerous situation as German forces built up in the Breslau area, so the Front commander, Marshal I. S. Konev, redirected the main forces of 3rd Guards Tank Army from its advance on Görlitz to the east against the flank and rear of Breslau. This diversion slowed the pace of 52nd Army's main offensive and by February 15 it went over to the defensive along a 120km front. On February 19 the 373rd was recognized for its role in forcing the Oder River and capturing several German towns with the award of the Order of Kutuzov, 2nd Degree.

78th Corps resumed the offensive within 48 hours, and by February 19 its left flank forces, including the 373rd, reached the Neisse River north of Penzig, and by the 20th all of its main forces had reached the river as well. By February 25 the entire 52nd Army consolidated along the Neisse, where it would remain until the Berlin operation. On April 5 the division's rifle regiments were decorated for their parts in the capture of Bunzlau as follows: 1235th - Order of Bogdan Khmelnitsky, 2nd Degree; 1237th - Order of Aleksandr Nevsky; 1239th - Order of Kutuzov, 3rd Degree.

=== Berlin and Prague Offensives ===
At the start of the Berlin offensive on April 16 the forces of 52nd Army were split; four of its divisions formed part of 1st Ukrainian Front's auxiliary shock group, while the remaining five divisions, including the 373rd, were deployed on a 101 km defensive front along the Neisse from Penzig to Jauer. The Army had the 7th Guards Mechanized Corps in its second echelon. 73rd Rifle Corps, which formed the Army's share of the shock group, quickly forced a crossing of the river despite repeated counterattacks by the Brandenburg Panzergrenadier Division. This success pulled in the 373rd on the flank of the shock group, and by the end of the day had helped break through the German's main defense zone to a depth of up to 10 km. The division, along with its Army, continued to advance in the direction of Dresden until after the fall of Berlin. Following this, it took part in the drive on Prague in the final days of the war. The division's men and women ended the war as the 373rd Rifle, Mirgorod, Order of the Red Banner, Order of Suvorov and Kutuzov Division (Russian: 373-я стрелковая Миргородская Краснознамённая орденов Суворова и Кутузова дивизия).

== Postwar ==
Under the terms of STAVKA Order No. 11096, part 7, of May 29, 78th Corps was to withdraw to Kielce, Poland, prior to being transferred with the rest of 52nd Army to the Northern Group of Forces. After relocating to Poland, the corps was soon further withdrawn with the army to the Carpathian Military District, with the 373rd stationed at Slavuta. It was disbanded with much of the army by June 12, 1946.
