= 11th Cavalry Corps =

- Active: Jan–Jul 1942
- Country: Soviet Union
- Branch: Cavalry
- Role: Breakthrough and Exploitation in Deep Operations
- Size: Corps
- Engagements: battles of Rzhev

The 11th Cavalry Corps of the Soviet Union's Red Army was a cavalry corps active during the Second World War.

It was created on 12 January 1942 at Kalinin Oblast. General Grigory Timofejev took command.

== Second World War ==
On January 12, 1942, the 11th Cavalry Corps passed the breakthrough sector of 39th Army, raided the far rear of the German Army Group Centre alongside the west of the Rzhev-Sychevka-Vyazma traffic line. On January 26, 1942, the Cavalry Corps cut the Vyazma-Smolensk road on the west of Vyazma, kept contact with the 33rd Army, the pioneering of Western Front, on the south-west of Vyazma, completed its campaign mission to envelop the Vyazma City.

From February to June 1942, the Cavalry Corps with 39th Army insisted defending the salient in the vicinity between Bely and Kholm-Zhirkovsky, which is nearly encircled by German troops, only a narrow corridor between Bely and Olenino to the main forces of Kalinin Front remained.

On July 2, 1942, the 9th Army of Germany launched the Operation Seydlitz, which is called Holme-Zhirkovskaya defensive operation by the Soviet Union, to eliminate the salient in the vicinity between Bely and Kholm-Zhirkovsky and annihilate the 39th Army and 11th Cavalry Corps. Intense fighting carried on to July 17, and the last resistance extinguished on July 23. After that, the unit designation of 11th Cavalry Corps was annulled in August 1942.

== Campaign history ==
Kalinin Front January–July 1942
Sychyovka-Vyazma Offensive as a mobile group of Kalinin Front in 1942
Holme-Zhirkovskaya defensive operation July 2–23, 1942

== Orders of Battle ==
- 18th Cavalry Division (Soviet Union) (1934–1942)
- 24th Cavalry Division (Soviet Union) (1935–1943)
- 82nd Cavalry Division (Soviet Union) (1941–1942)

== Commanders of the 11th Cavalry Corps ==
General Grigory Timofejev (January–May 1942)
Colonel, from July 1942, Major General Sergei Vladimirovich Sokolov (May–August 1942).

== Sources ==
- Glants, D.M. (1), Soviet Military Deception in the Second World War, Frank Cass, London, 1989
- Glantz, D.M. (2), Companion to Colossus Reborn: key documents and statistics, University of Kansas2005
- Perecheni No.4, Command of Corps which were a part of the active Army during the years of the Great Patriotic War 1941-45, Supplement to the direction of the General Staff for year 1956 No.168780, Moscow, 1956
