= 18th Cavalry Division =

7th Tadzhik Mountain Cavalry Division ?–1936 18th Mountain Cavalry Division 1936–1942
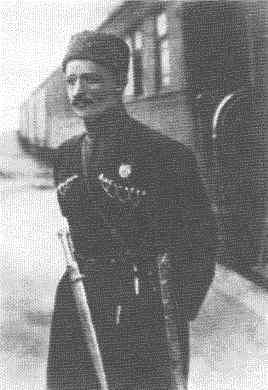
- Active: ? – July 1942
- Country: Soviet Union
- Branch: Cavalry
- Role: Breakthrough and Exploitation in Deep Operations
- Size: Division

The 18th Mountain Cavalry Division was formed in 1936 by renaming the 7th Tadzhik Mountain Cavalry Division in the Central Asia Military District.

== Wartime Service ==
=== 1941 ===
At the beginning of war the division was one of the three Mountain Cavalry Divisions assigned to the 4th Cavalry Corps in Central Asia. The division remained there until November when it was shipped forward to the Reserve of the Supreme High Command. The division was briefly in the reserves before being sent to the Kalinin Front's 30th Army. Along with the other two cavalry divisions in the army they formed the 11th Cavalry Corps in January 1942.

Despite being at 1/3 its prewar strength the division jumped off against the German flank north of Moscow. From February until July 1942 the 11th Cavalry Corps along with the 39th Army defended a nearly encircled salient in the vicinity of Bely and Vyazma-Smolensk. The Germans launched Operation "Seydlitz" on 2 July 1942 and eliminated the salient by the end of the month. The division was officially disbanded on 22 July 1942.

== Subordinate Units ==
- 36th Mountain Cavalry Regiment
- 46th Mountain Cavalry Regiment
- 97th Mountain Cavalry Regiment
- 33rd Tank Regiment

== See also ==
- Cavalry Divisions of the Soviet Union 1917-1945
