= 82nd Cavalry Division =

82nd Cavalry Division 1941–1942
- Active: August 1941 – 7 August 1942
- Country: Soviet Union
- Branch: Cavalry
- Role: Breakthrough and Exploitation in Deep Operations
- Size: Division

The 82nd Cavalry Division was formed from August to 18 October 1941 in the Sverdlovsk Oblast in the Urals Military District.

== Wartime service ==
Formed as part of the mass of reservists in the Urals and Siberian Military Districts and used in the winter counteroffensive in 1941–42. The division left the Urals in November and was assigned to the Kalinin Front's 30th Army stationed northwest of Moscow. Seriously short of heavy weapons as well as saddles for it horses the division was assigned the 145th Tank Battalion on 2 December in order to provide some kind of fire support for the division. After a month of fighting the division was assigned to the newly formed 11th Cavalry Corps and spent the rest of the war in the unit.

The 11th Cavalry Corps advanced behind German lines and came close to cutting the German supply lines near Smolensk. The corps and division continued to operate behind enemy lines until June 1942 when German forces cleared them. Most of the corps was destroyed with only remnants escaping. As a result, on 7 August 1942, the division was disbanded with the survivors used to reinforce the 24th Cavalry Division.

== Subordinate units ==
- 201st Cavalry Regiment
- 206th Cavalry Regiment
- 211th Cavalry Regiment

== See also ==
- Cavalry Divisions of the Soviet Union 1917-1945
