= Fyodor Khaskhachikh =

Soviet philosopher (1907–1942)

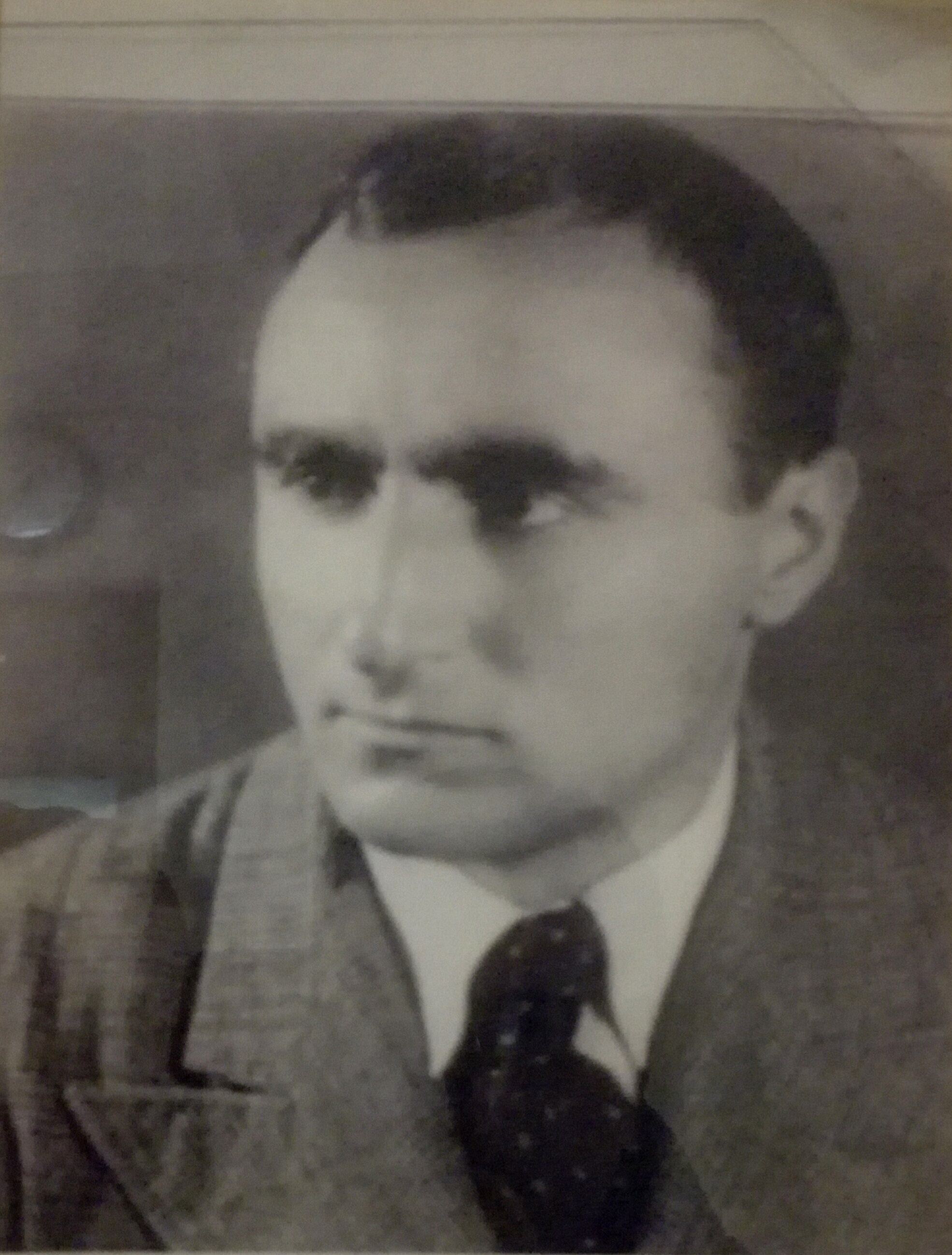

Fyodor Ignatyevich Khaskhachikh (Russian: Фёдор Игна́тьевич Хасха́чих; 21 March 1907 – 5 November 1942) was a Soviet philosopher and dean of philosophy at the Moscow Institute of Philosophy, Literature, and History from 1939 to 1941. He worked on the history of epistemology and problems of epistemology within the framework of dialectical materialism.

A candidate of sciences, Khaskhachikh was working on a dissertation for the degree of doctor of sciences when he left the world of academia to volunteer for the Red Army after the German invasion of the Soviet Union in 1941. He died in World War II as a member of the Red Army's Kalinin Front in 1942.

== Selected works ==
- Khaskhachikh, F. I. O poznovayemosti mira (On the Knowability of the World). Moscow: 1946.
  - German translation: Über die Erkennbarkeit der Welt. Berlin: Dietz Verlag, 1949.
