= Operation "Seydlitz" =

Series of Nazi operations in World War II

- Part of the Eastern Front of World War II
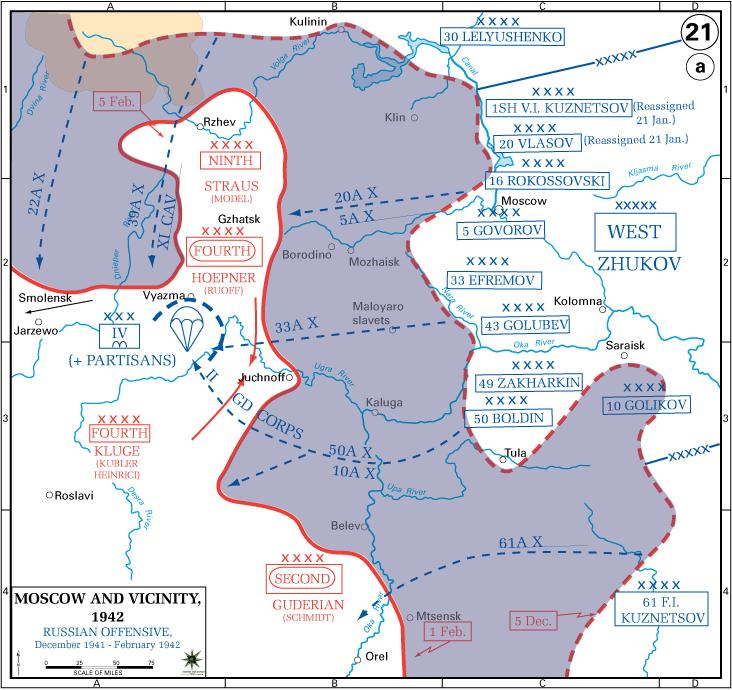
Date	July 1942
Location	Rzhev and Velikie Luki salients, Russian SFSR
Result	German victory

Belligerents
Soviet Union	Germany

Commanders and leaders
Ivan Konev	Walter Model

Casualties and losses
4,386 killed 8,020 wounded 47,072 missing	810 killed 3,087 wounded 84 missing

Operation Seydlitz was of an auxiliary nature and was aimed at liberating the zone of the German 9th Army from the penetration of the Soviet 39th Army of Lieutenant General Ivan Maslennikov and the 11th Cavalry Corps of Colonel S. Sokolov.

== Background ==
The successes achieved by the Wehrmacht in the south of the Eastern Front near Kharkov and in the north near Lyuban in encircling large Soviet forces allowed Adolf Hitler to begin planning active operations in the zone of Army Group Center. As stated in the war log of the German High Command of the Armed Forces on June 24, 1942, Hitler in the conversation referred to "the likelihood that the Russian resistance forces are very weakened. In this case, you need to think about one offensive (operation) in the (sector of) Army Group Center. To do this, first of all, a concentrated attack on Kaluga will be considered with the goal of subsequently destroying a number of enemy formations and achieving a reduction (line) of the front by winter." A day later, June 25, the general idea takes on more specific goals and outlines: "The advantage of the operation of Army Group Center (at Sukhinichi) is that winter positions and starting positions for later operations on Moscow are reached in advance."

== Comparison of strength ==
On July 2, the Soviet 39th Army included the 21st Guards Rifle Division, 252nd, 256th, 357th, 373rd and 381st Rifle Divisions. The total number of units and formations of the 39th Army without rear services reached 36,000 men. The 11th Cavalry Corps included the 18th, 24th, 36th and 82nd Cavalry Divisions. The destabilizing factor was that the commanders of two Soviet different armies were responsible for the communications of Maslennikov’s and Sokolov’s troops—the northern and southern “walls” of the corridor were defended by the 22nd and 41st armies of the Kalinin Front, respectively. In Operation Seydlitz, the command of Army Group Center involved 10 infantry, four tank divisions (1st, 2nd, 5th and 20th), one motorized infantry division (14th Infantry Division) and a cavalry brigade von der Meden.

== German offensive ==
The German offensive began on July 2 at 03:00 Berlin time after a short artillery preparation and an air strike by Junkers Ju 87 dive bombers. From the north, from the area Olenino, the XXIII Army Corps of General Schubert was advancing in two groups. In the 22nd Army, the blow fell on the weakest 380th Rifle Division, which at the beginning of the battle numbered 5,725 personnel and only seven heavy machine guns and three antitank guns. From the Bely area, the Ezebek group, consisting of the 2nd Panzer Division and the 246th Infantry Division, began an offensive to the east. In the future, they were supposed to turn north, towards the XXIII Corps. Opposed to two German divisions was the 17th Guards Rifle Division of the 41st Army. It numbered 7,559 men with 82 heavy machine guns, but had only 19 antitank guns and 47 antitank rifles. According to the Soviet command, the breakthrough of the defense was the result of subjective rather than objective reasons.

The log of combat operations of the Soviet 41st Army stated: “The 48th Guards Regiment, 17th Guards Rifle Division, as a result of a long stay on the defensive, dulling of vigilance, the will to fight and win, did not show due persistence in battle, and by the end of the first day surrendered the line of Defense by Germans, which he had been preparing for 3-4 months.”

Here, Soviet troops quickly moved to actively counter the German offensive: already in the evening of the first day of the operation, a counterattack followed with the participation of the 21st Tank Brigade, 135th Rifle Division and 24th Rifle Division on the flank of the German 2nd Panzer Division. The repulsion of the counterattack by the advancing German group continued throughout the day on July 3. The German cavalry of von der Meden played an important role in the success of Operation Seydlitz. Moving through the forests, the cavalry brigade on July 3 reached the rear of the units of the 256th Rifle Division defending on the highway. The front in this direction was broken through, and the collapse of the 22nd Army's defense led to catastrophic consequences. According to the version set out in the combat log of the 41st Army, “37 enemy tanks with machine gunners broke through the front of the 22nd Army from the Shizderovo area, unexpectedly attacked the headquarters of the 135th Rifle Division in Yegorye and spread to the west, attacked from the rear parts of the 262nd Rifle Division and partly the 17th Guards Rifle Division.”

The final success of the German offensive was achieved, according to Soviet data, on Monday, July 6, 1942, when the 1st and 2nd German tank divisions met near the village of Pushkari on the Bely-Olenino highway. All units and formations of the 39th Army and the 11th Cavalry Corps were surrounded, as well as formations of the 41st (17th Guards Rifle Division, 135th Rifle Division, 21st Tank Brigade) and 22nd (355th Rifle Division, units of the 380th and 185th Rifle Division) Armies. Almost simultaneously, the Soviet group was cut in two, into northern and southern “cauldrons”. The impossibility of effective air supply due to the weakness of Soviet transport aviation contributed to the rapid disorganization of the encircled troops.

During July 7–9, 1942, units of the 41st Army broke out of the encirclement. About 1,000 men came out of the 135th Rifle Division, and from the 17th Guards Rifle Division - 1,759 men. During the same period, individuals and units of the 24th and 46th Rifle Divisions, 357th, 355th and 262nd Rifle Divisions emerged. The cavalrymen of the 24th cavalry division managed to achieve success due to military cunning: in addition to the main breakthrough, two false sectors were prepared and supported by fire. The division's 1,282 men and 730 horses escaped encirclement on the night of July 9. The cavalrymen also claimed to withdraw up to 1,000 men from other divisions and 350 people from among the wounded of the 17th Guards Rifle Division. In German sources, July 12, 1942 is considered the official end date of Operation Seydlitz, but organized resistance and attempts to break through the Soviet troops did not stop. By July 17, a group of about 1,500 men had gathered in the northern “cauldron” under the leadership of the commander of the 18th Rifle Division, Major General P. S. Ivanov, and approximately 8,000 men remained in the southern “cauldron” under the command of the headquarters of the 39th Army. Wounded in the leg on July 12, the commander of the 39th Army, Lieutenant General I. I. Maslennikov, on the orders of the front commander, flew out of the “cauldron” on a U-2 plane on the night of July 19, while the deputy commander, Lieutenant General I. A. Bogdanov remained with the troops.

The last major attempt to relieve the 39th Army was made on the evening of July 21, when units of the 185th Rifle Division of the 22nd Army attacked the encircled group. By 23:00, 3,500 men had left the encirclement at the division's site. During the battles to secure a corridor for the troops to exit, General Bogdanov was wounded and was taken by plane to the hospital, where he died on July 24. In total, based on the results of the breakthrough the combat log of the Kalinin Front headquarters indicated: “During the night of July 22, about 7,000 men came out.” This moment can be considered the day the struggle of the 39th Army and the 11th Cavalry Corps ended.

== Casualties ==
Soviet casualties
	KIA	WIA	MIA	Total
22nd Army	1,433	3,279	3,905	8,617
39th Army	582	269	22,749	23,600
41st Army	2,000	4,156	6,347	12,503
11th Cavalry Corps	371	316	14,071	14,758

In total, Soviet casualties amounted to almost 60,000 men. German casualties were 15 times less: 810 KIA, 84 MIA, 3,087 WIA. 3,981 in total.

== Outcome ==
The successful completion of Operation Seydlitz for the Germans significantly shortened the front line, freeing up troops that could be used for subsequent operations against Soviet Western Front.
