= 381st Rifle Division =

381st Rifle Division (August, 1941 – July, 1945)
- Active: 1941 - 1945
- Country: Soviet Union
- Branch: Red Army
- Type: Division
- Role: Infantry
- Engagements: Battles of Rzhev; Operation Seydlitz; Battle for Velikiye Luki; Battle of Nevel (1943); Polotsk–Vitebsk Offensive; Vitebsk (Gorodok) Offensive; Vyborg–Petrozavodsk Offensive; Vistula-Oder Offensive; East Pomeranian Offensive; Berlin Strategic Offensive Operation
- Decorations: Order of the Red Banner
- Battle honours: Leningrad

Commanders
- Notable commanders: Col. Arkhip Ivanovich Tolstov; Lt. Col. Vasilii Pavlovich Shulga; Maj. Gen. Boris Semyonovich Maslov; Maj. Gen. Aleksandr Vasilevich Yakushov; Col. Ivan Ivanovich Serebryakov

The 381st Rifle Division was raised in 1941 as an infantry division of the Red Army, and served for the duration of the Great Patriotic War in that role. It was formed in August of 1941 in the Urals Military District. It first served in the fighting around the Rzhev salient, and came close to being completely destroyed in July of 1942. The division's survivors were moved north, away from the front for a major rebuilding. It returned to the front in October, joining the 3rd Shock Army for the battle and siege of Velikiye Luki. The division remained in this general area in western Russia until March, 1944, when it was moved to the Reserve of the Supreme High Command and then to 21st Army north of Leningrad in April. It served in the Vyborg–Petrozavodsk offensive, winning a battle honor and the Order of the Red Banner in the process, before being transferred back to Belarus. As part of the 2nd Shock Army of the 2nd Belorussian Front, the 381st advanced across Poland and Pomerania during the winter of 1945, then joined its Front's advance across the Oder River into Germany in late April, ending the war on the Baltic coast. In the summer of 1945, the division was disbanded.

== Formation ==
The 381st began forming in August, 1941 in the Urals Military District at Zlatoust in the Chelyabinsk Oblast, based on the first wartime shtat (table of organization and equipment) for rifle divisions. Its order of battle was as follows:

- 1259th Rifle Regiment
- 1261st Rifle Regiment
- 1263rd Rifle Regiment
- 935th Artillery Regiment
- 248th Antitank Battalion
- 197th Machine-gun Battalion (August 9, 1942 until February 26, 1943)
- 434th Reconnaissance Company
- 441st Sapper Battalion (after September 7, 1942, 652nd Sapper Battalion)
- 823rd Signal Battalion (later 257th Signal Company)
- 457th Medical/Sanitation Battalion
- 450th Chemical Protection (Anti-gas) Company
- 487th Motor Transport Company
- 226th Field Bakery
- 795th Divisional Veterinary Hospital
- 1446th Field Postal Station
- 1249th Field Office of the State Bank (later 745th)

Col. Arkhip Ivanovich Tolstov was assigned to command of the division on September 17, and he would remain in command until March 1, 1942. In November it was assigned to 39th Army in the reserve of the Supreme High Command and began moving towards the front. 39th Army was assigned to Kalinin Front and the division first saw action under these commands in January, 1942.

== Battles for Rzhev ==
Beginning on January 8, 1942, the Army took part in the Sychyovka-Vyasma Offensive Operation, which was planned "to encircle, and then capture or destroy the enemy's entire Mozhaisk - Gzhatsk - Vyasma grouping", that is, what later became known as the Rzhev salient. Kalinin Front's shock group of the 39th and 29th Armies and 11th Cavalry Corps was intended to envelop the forces of German 9th Army from the west. The 39th breached the German defenses west of the town of Rzhev then drove southward through their rear areas. During this advance the headquarters reported back to the Front:

"The adversary was using the fortified belt, which had been prepared and built by our units during the autumn retreat, and about the presence of which the army was completely unaware. This fortified belt had pillboxes and bunkers. The enemy, relying on these defensive fortifications, significantly increased their resistance..."

By the third week of the month, having advanced 80 km into enemy territory, the Army's forces were engaged in savage fighting for Sychyovka, a linchpin of the German supply network. While the Soviet troops managed to seize the railroad station, they were unable to take the town. By the end of January the successful stage of the Soviet counteroffensive had mostly come to an end, in part because most of the rifle regiments had been reduced to 80 - 120 men each.

In early February the 9th Army began counterattacking, and of February 5 cut off 29th Army from 39th and encircled the former. The Front commander, Lt. Gen. I. S. Konev, ordered 29th Army to move southwest towards the 39th. Small formations began to trickle out of the pocket on the night of February 17/18 and continued for the next several days. On February 19 Konev issued new orders intended to isolate and destroy the German forces in and around Olenino; 39th Army was to link up with 30th Army on February 23, but in the event, due to supply shortages, could not even begin its attack until the 25th. This effort made almost no progress at all.

On March 1 Colonel Tolstov left his command, which was taken over by Lt. Col. Vasilii Pavlovich Shulga. He was in turn replaced by Col. Boris Semyonovich Maslov on May 24. As summer began 9th Army was determined to clear out the Soviet forces in its rear. Operation Seydlitz began on July 2, focusing on the gap between the Bely and Olenino areas. The Soviet troops put up fierce resistance, beating the Germans back with heavy casualties on some sectors. 9th Army brought up reinforcements backed by air strikes on July 4. On July 5 (German accounts) or July 6 (Soviet accounts) the German pincers met at Pushkari, north of Bely. 39th Army, 11th Cavalry Corps, and elements of 41st and 22nd Armies were now encircled. 39th Army quickly decided to withdraw, beginning to retreat on July 5 to the Obsha River. Efforts to cross the river failed, so the remaining troops were led to a forested area to the southeast. Near midnight on July 9 radio contact with Front headquarters was lost. On July 12, 9th Army reported Operation Seydlitz complete, although thousands of Soviet soldiers remained behind their lines. On July 17 a group of about 8,000 men, including the Army commander, Lt. Gen. I. I. Maslennikov, his deputy commander, artillery chief and other commanders managed a crossing of the Obsha and escaped. In all, 39th Army lost 22,749 in missing alone. The command of the 381st managed to get out as well, so instead of being disbanded what little remained of the division was sent all the way back to the Arkhangelsk Military District for a complete rebuilding.

== Battle for Velikiye Luki ==
In October the repaired and replenished division returned to Kalinin Front to join 3rd Shock Army, where it would remain for nearly a year. 3rd Shock was in the westernmost sector of the Toropets salient, facing the rail hub of Velikiye Luki, defended primarily by a regiment of the German 83rd Infantry Division. In the plan for the offensive the 381st was to cross the Lovat River north of the city, penetrate the German outpost line, and link up with the 9th Guards and 357th Rifle Divisions of the 5th Guards Rifle Corps to form the inner line of encirclement around the enemy garrison.

The offensive began before dawn on November 24. Tank support for all the attacking rifle divisions fell behind by 6 – 9 hours due to the difficulty of crossing the partly-frozen Lovat. By the end of day on November 26 the 381st had nearly reached the Velikiye Luki - Novosokolniki railway and was within a few kilometres of linking up with 9th Guards and the 357th. Two days later the division joined hands with the 357th in the western outskirts of Velikiye Luki and the 9th Guards in the area of the Ostryan railway station, completing the inner encirclement as German outposts fell back into the city.

On December 2 and 3 the German Group "Chevallerie" of Army Group Center attempted to relieve its encircled forces. The 8th Panzer Division, which was much depleted in tank strength, was fended off by one regiment of the 381st and the 31st Rifle Brigade while the other two regiments with the 18th Mechanized Brigade tied down German units attacking from Novosokolniki. By the last days of December the German garrison in Velikiye Luki was reduced to holding just the railway station and the old fortress or Citadel. On the morning of January 4, 1943, Group "Chevallerie" launched its final attempt to relieve the city, which reached to within 3 km of its western outskirts before being forced to a standstill by January 12. Five days later Velikiye Luki was finally liberated. On January 27 Colonel Maslov was promoted to the rank of major general. During the next months 3rd Shock gradually advanced westward in the direction of Novosokolniki, which involved a seesaw battle over several weeks for a German stronghold on the Ptahinski Hill, which finally ended on July 6. In February the 381st came under the command of 5th Guards Corps, where it would remain until June.

== Into Belarus ==
On July 9 General Maslov was appointed to command of the 19th Guards Rifle Division and was replaced by Maj. Gen. Aleksandr Vasilevich Yakushov. The 381st remained as a separate division in 3rd Shock Army until September, when it was reassigned to the 4th Shock Army, still in Kalinin Front. As of October 1 it was assigned to the 83rd Rifle Corps. On October 6 the 3rd and 4th Shock Armies began the Nevel Offensive Operation, which began with a surprise success on the first day when 3rd Shock's 28th Rifle Division routed the 2nd Luftwaffe Field Division, creating a gap which was exploited by 21st Guards Rifle Division and 78th Tank Brigade driving 25 km deep behind German lines and taking Nevel off the march by the end of the day. Simultaneously, 4th Shock began a drive in the direction of Gorodok with the 2nd Guards Rifle Corps on the right, next to the breakthrough sector, and 83rd Corps on the left, with the 381st in second echelon. Although this attack penetrated German defenses to a depth of about 20 km, it faltered in the face of enemy reserves and by October 10 halted just short of the Nevel - Gorodok - Vitebsk railroad and highway.

By the start of November, Kalinin Front had become 1st Baltic Front, and the 381st had been reassigned to 2nd Guards Corps. On November 2 a new offensive began in the direction of Vitebsk and Polotsk:

"In an early morning fog on 2 November the Third and Fourth Shock Armies penetrated the Third Panzer Army left flank southwest of Nevel. They had paved the way during the five previous days with heavy attacks that drove a deep dent in the Third Panzer Army line. After the breakthrough, which opened a 10-mile-wide [16 km] gap, Third Shock Army turned north behind Sixteenth Army's flank, and Fourth Shock Army turned southwest behind Third Panzer Army. Army Group Center shifted a panzer division north from Ninth Army. With that division it was able to strengthen the Third Panzer Army flank below the breakthrough and deflect Fourth Shock Army southwestward away from the panzer army's rear."

In his memoirs, the commander of 2nd Guards Corps, Maj. Gen. A. P. Beloborodov, recounted:

"On November 6, the headquarters and the corps administration were relocated to the mouth of the salient. At this time the corps included four rifle divisions — the 47th, 154th, 156th, and 381st — and the 236th Tank Brigade... The mission was to expand the gap to the south. The 154th and 156th divisions were already advancing along the Nevel road on Ezerishche, Bychikha and Gorodok, and the 381st and 47th divisions... were to attack these towns from the west, from within the salient, and cooperate with other units of the 4th Shock Army, advancing from the east, to encircle the enemy."

In addition the Front's 43rd and 39th Armies were also attacking Vitebsk from the east, along the road from Smolensk. On November 8, 20th Panzer and 87th Infantry Division of 3rd Panzer Army attacked north into the breakthrough area and gained nearly 8 km by the end of the day, then paused, awaiting a similar attack from Army Group North. While this was occurring, Beloborodov reported that the 381st was "[o]n the march and fulfilling its previously assigned mission". On the night of November 9/10, 20th Panzer's battle group was contained along the Gorodok - Nevel road while the regrouped 381st and 154th Divisions, supported by the 236th Tanks, wheeled southward to assault the German defenses at Gorodok from the west. After crossing the Obolia River on November 11 the attacking force was only 22 km west of this key German stronghold. During the remainder of the month Soviet forces continued to press towards Gorodok, but unseasonal mild weather with accompanying heavy mud and desperate German countermeasures held them off.

=== Battles for Vitebsk ===
On December 1 General Yakushov left his command, which was taken over by Col. Ivan Ivanovich Serebryakov. The fighting for Gorodok resumed on December 13. By this time the STAVKA had decided that the key to further advance in Belorussia was to seize Vitebsk, and the key to this was Gorodok. At this time the division was still in the 2nd Guards Corps. Since 4th Shock was operating across a broad front, it planned to make its main attack with 2nd Guards, supported by the 166th Rifle Division, 5th Tank and 3rd Guards Cavalry Corps, and the 34th Guards Tank Brigade. This force was to attack eastwards through the 6 km-wide passage between Lakes Bernovo and Chernovo and join hands with the spearheads of 11th Guards Army 18 km north of Gorodok. The assault began with a one-and-a-half hour artillery preparation; the 381st on the left flank made little progress but the center and right flank forces drove from 3 to 5 km into the defenses of 20th Panzer. 4th Shock's commander, Lt. Gen. V. I. Shvetsov, ordered 41st Tank Brigade and two cavalry divisions into this gap early on October 14. By the end of the day the 47th Rifle and 5th Guards Cavalry Divisions had cut the Nevel - Gorodok railway near Rosliaki Station, while the 381st and the 90th Guards Rifle Division encircled a "modest number" of German troops in the village of Vyrovlia and sent their forward detachments ahead 1.5 – 2 km to the north to link up with advance elements of the 11th Guards Army.

This linkup began the encirclement of most of German IX Army Corps in the northern end of their Gorodok - Nevel salient, but the High Command refused to authorize a retreat. Counterattacks by 20th Panzer, with a force of seven to fifteen tanks, failed to break through, and by early on December 15 the two Soviet armies had completely enveloped the 87th and 129th Infantry Divisions and elements of several others. Over the next 48 hours the 381st and the rest of 2nd Guards Corps attacked concentrically with divisions of 11th Guards' 8th and 16th Guards Rifle Corps to liquidate the trapped German grouping. In the end Soviet sources claimed 20,000 killed or captured from the pocket, while German sources admit to just over 2,000. The remnants of IX Corps withdrew to lines just north of Gorodok while 1st Baltic Front regrouped. As part of this, 2nd Guards Corps marched to a new concentration region to the south of Lake Kosho on December 18. Gorodok finally fell to 11th Guards Army on December 24.

On the same day 4th Shock continued the offensive. The first objective of 2nd Guards Corps was to cut the Vitebsk - Polotsk rail line, while 4th Shock and 11th Guards were to take Vitebsk itself by December 31. At the outset the 2nd Guards and 83rd Rifle Corps, spearheaded by two brigades of 5th Tank Corps, smashed through the German defenses at the junction of LIII Army Corps' 6th Luftwaffe Field Division and IX Corps' 252nd Infantry Division and penetrated up to 4 km into the German defenses. The next day, when 2nd Guards opened the gap further near Grabnitsa, 3rd Panzer Army was forced to dispatch the 5th Jäger Division from reserve. Meanwhile, LIII Corps was ordered to withdraw to a new line closer to the city. A fierce meeting engagement was fought on December 26 as 2nd Guards, 5th Tank and 3rd Guards Cavalry Corps pushed south from Grabnitsa, created a salient 8 km deep and 6 km wide and temporarily cut the Vitebsk - Polotsk line before running into counterattacks by 5th Jäger. Seesaw fighting raged over the next day as the German forces cleared the railway and contained the penetration. By December 31 the 5th Jäger and 6th Luftwaffe Divisions had retaken about half of the salient. In the first days of January, 1944 the 381st was involved in particularly intense fighting in a salient south of Lake Zaronovskoe, attempting in vain to break through the German defenses around their strongpoint at Gorbachi. By January 5 the battle died down as both sides were exhausted; the division was down to 4,500 - 5,000 men like the rest of 4th Shock.

The division got only a short breather because the STAVKA ordered 4th Shock and 11th Guards to begin a new attack early on January 6. 2nd Guards and 83rd Corps were again designated as its Army's shock group, and Beloborodov put the 29th and 381st Divisions in the first echelon and the 166th in support. The first objective was the positions of the 12th Infantry Division of LIII Corps in the sector from Lake Zaronovskoe to Gorbachi. The shock group attacked after a short but intense artillery preparation but almost immediately encountered determined resistance. Even with the commitment of the 166th Division the 2nd Guards advanced roughly 1,000 metres north of Gorbachi and by January 14 it was clear the Corps had shot its bolt. It was not so clear to the STAVKA, which did not permit a halt until January 24.

The offensive was again renewed on February 2. 2nd Guards Corps provided one of the Army's two shock groups, but to begin with the 381st was in the second echelon. After an extensive artillery preparation the assault quickly overcame the forward defenses of 12th Infantry south of Lake Zaronovskoe and in two days of heavy fighting advanced up to 3.5 km deep through a 1 km-wide gap. However, to the west the 117th Division had no success on its sector. Given these mixed results the 381st was committed late on February 3, along with the 5th Tank Corps. By days end on February 5 the depth of the penetration had increased to 6 km, but the German defense was firming up. The shock group struck again on February 7, and the 90th Guards managed to drive a narrow 1 km wedge into 12th Infantry's defenses just west of Kozaki. Spearheaded by nearly 100 tanks, over the next two days the 90th and the 381st helped carve a penetration 5 km wide and 3 km deep to the northern outskirts of Shatrovo, and just 15 km northwest of Vitebsk itself. In further fighting on this sector from February 10–13 the two divisions seized Stepankova during another advance of 1.5 km. Finally the Front commander ordered a concentrated assault on February 15 in which Gorbachi was finally taken and the 90th and 381st cut the railway north of Staroe Selo. This was the last gasp. The rifle divisions were down to less than 3,000 men each and 5th Tank had just a handful of vehicles still in action. Late on February 16 the STAVKA, eyeing developments near Leningrad, closed down the offensive.

== Vyborg–Petrozavodsk Offensive ==
As of the beginning of March the 2nd Guards Rifle Corps, with the 381st, had been reassigned to the 6th Guards Army, still in 1st Baltic Front, but for the division this would be a temporary arrangement. On March 19 General Yakushov returned to command and he would remain in this post for the duration of the war. At about the same time the 381st went back into the Reserve of the Supreme High Command for rebuilding. In the course of this it was assigned to the 21st Army in Leningrad Front in April as part of the buildup to the offensive that would knock Finland out of the war. This Army arrived in the Ropsha region on April 28 and was soon moved to the Karelian Isthmus. The division was now in the 97th Rifle Corps with the 178th and 358th Rifle Divisions.

In the plan for the offensive, 97th Corps was deployed on the right flank of its Army, and would be handed off to 23rd Army after the crossing of the Sestra River. The 358th and 381st were in the Corps first echelon, on a front of 9.5 km. On the evening of June 9 the first echelon rifle corps of 21st Army fired a 15-minute artillery preparation, followed by a reconnaissance-in-force to assess the damage. The offensive proper began at 0820 hours on June 10, following a 140-minute artillery onslaught. 97th Corps attacked towards Kallelovo and penetrated the forward Finnish defenses, but only advanced 5 km, reaching the south bank of the Sestra by the end of the day. Meanwhile, the Finns were ordered to pull back to their second line. For the next day, the Corps was ordered to continue the advance on Kallelovo, and at 1500 hours the handover to 23rd Army took place. By day's end the 97th and 98th Rifle Corps reached the Termolovo-Khirelia line. On June 12, 97th Corps enveloped Termolovo from the west to northeast, but the pace of the advance was slowing, and it became clear that a regrouping would be necessary before tackling that second line. The 381st, with its Corps, was withdrawn to the Front reserve for a brief rest and refitting.

Between June 14–17 the two Soviet armies penetrated the second Finnish defense line and were in pursuit towards the third. The high command still considered that progress was too slow, and orders emanated from Moscow exhorting them on to Vyborg. To this end, the rested 97th Corps was again subordinated to 21st Army on the morning of the 18th and, supported by the 1st and 152nd Tank Brigades, prepared to take the lead in breaking the third line. The Corps was to penetrate between Summa and Markki at the boundary of the Finnish 4th Infantry Division and 3rd Infantry Brigade, advance along the Summa-Vyborg road to Khumola, and capture a railroad junction south of the city. 72nd Rifle Division would cover the Corps' left flank while, farther left, the 110th Rifle Corps would also attack near Summa.

The assault, backed by massive artillery support, began early on June 19 and gained almost immediate success. Overall, the forces of 21st Army ripped a 70 km-wide gap in the Finnish defenses from Muola to the Gulf of Finland, and advanced as much as 14 km during 18 hours of bitter fighting against determined but confused resistance. 97th Corps drove north on the Vyborg road, smashing the Finnish IV Army Corps in the process; at the end of the day 152nd Tank Brigade was attacking Autiokorpela. The plan for the next day called for 97th Corps to advance along the rail line and then envelop Vyborg's defenses from the northeast. When the advance began in the morning the Soviets soon learned that the Finns had abandoned the city overnight. The 381st would subsequently be granted a battle honor, "Leningrad", for its part in this victory, as well as a unit award of the Order of the Red Banner.

By the beginning of July the division had returned to 23rd Army, now in the 98th Rifle Corps, and during the next two months it was still in this Corps, back in 21st Army. Later in September it was moved, with its Corps, once again to the Reserve of the Supreme High Command, and in October it and 98th Corps were assigned to the 2nd Shock Army in 2nd Belorussian Front, in Poland. The 381st would remain under these commands for the duration of the war.

== Into Germany ==
With the rest of its Front, the 381st participated in the Vistula-Oder Offensive. When the Front's attack began on January 14, 1945, 2nd Shock Army was tasked to break out of the Różan bridgehead across the Narew River, with the immediate goal of taking the town of Ciechanów and then, in conjunction with 65th Army, to eliminate the enemy in the Pułtusk area. 98th Corps was in the Army's first echelon, and, once a breach in the German defenses had been created, would support the commitment of the 8th Guards Tank Corps. On the second day, 2nd Shock encountered powerful resistance in the form of more than 100 tanks of 7th Panzer Division backing counterattacks by 5th Jäger and 7th Infantry Divisions in a desperate effort to prevent the encirclement of the Pułtusk grouping. As a result, by the end of the day the 98th Corps gained only 1 - 2.5 km. The situation changed overnight as the German forces began to withdraw from Pułtusk and on January 16, led by 8th Guards Tank, 2nd Shock advanced 20 km. The next day the 98th Corps helped to liberate Ciechanów and was following 8th Guards Tank in the direction of Mława, cutting the highway from this fortified center to Bieżuń by the end of January 18 after a further advance of 30 km.

The second stage of the East Pomeranian Offensive began on February 24. At this time 98th Corps consisted of the 381st and 281st Rifle Divisions. The 381st had turned over its defensive sector to forces of the 3rd Belorussian Front and was moving from the Elbing area to 2nd Shock's left flank. In this stage the Army was directed to attack in the direction of Gdańsk. During the course of the fighting from February 24 to March 5 the 2nd Shock and 65th Armies on the Front's right flank advanced only 8 – 10 km. In the third stage, from March 6–13, the Front was directed to destroy the German 2nd Army which was cut off in northeastern Pomerania. On the first day the 98th Corps completed the elimination of the German forces encircled in the fortress of Graudenz. Beginning on March 11 2nd Shock was to attack towards Gdańsk from the south, and advanced along both banks of the Vistula over the next two days before reaching the lines of its fortified area on the 13th. After ten days on the defensive, 2nd Shock joined the assault on March 23, and by the end of the 26th had helped force the German Gdańsk group back into the city proper. Over the following days it cleared the enemy from the area between the Vistula and the Gdańsk - Praust railway as the city fell on March 30.

== Berlin Offensive ==
By April 1 the 2nd Shock was fighting along the line Schoensee - Kriefkol - Nobel - Plenendorf. At the start of the Berlin Offensive the right wing armies of 2nd Belorussian Front, the 19th and 2nd Shock, were tasked with holding a firm defensive line on the Kolberg - Walddenenow - Ihnamünde sector. 2nd Shock was also to force the Waite Streve and the Damanscher Strom straits in order to support 65th Army in taking Stettin, but 98th Corps was not part of this. By the end of April 25 the Front had finished breaking through the German defense along the western bank of the Oder River, and from this point 2nd Shock and 65th Armies were give the task of attacking to the northwest. 2nd Shock was to advance in the general direction of Anklam and Stralsund, with part of its forces detached to clear Usedom and Rügen Islands. During April 27 it completely destroyed the former Stettin garrison, which had fallen back to the north, and the 4th "Pomerania" Regiment defending north of the city. From April 28 to May 2 the advance averaged 25 to 30 km per day and on that day the Army reached the Baltic coast on the sector Freest - Kinnbachenhagen.

The division ended the war as the 381st Rifle, Leningrad, Order of the Red Banner Division (Russian: 381-я стрелковая Ленинградская Краснознамённая дивизия). According to STAVKA Order No. 11097 of May 29, 1945, part 8, the 381st is listed as one of the rifle divisions to be "disbanded in place". It was disbanded in accordance with the directive in July 1945.
