= 39th Army (Soviet Union) =

Soviet Army formation

- 39-я армия
- Active: 1941–42 c. 1945–56 c. 1967–92
- Country: Soviet Union
- Branch: Red Army
- Type: Combined arms
- Size: Field Army; Three Corps and additional units
- Part of: Transbaikal Military District; Soviet troops in Mongolia
- Engagements: Battles of Rzhev, Soviet invasion of Manchuria

Commanders
- Notable commanders: General Ivan Ivanovich Maslennikov

The 39th Army (Russian: 39-я армия) was a Field Army of the Soviet Union's Red Army during World War II and of the Soviet Army during the Cold War.

== Formation and Kalinin Offensive ==
It was first formed on 15 November 1941 in the Arkhangelsk Military District, in accordance with a directive issued by the Stavka (command headquarters) on 2 November 1941. The army was directly subordinate to the Stavka.

On 1 December 1941 the army was listed by the Soviet General Staff's official order of battle listings as including seven rifle divisions and two cavalry divisions (355th, 357th, 361st, 369th, 373rd, 377th, and 381st Rifle Divisions, plus 76th and 94th Cavalry Divisions.

On 1 December 1941 the army was tasked to build defense lines along the eastern bank of the river Sheksna. After regrouping in the area of Torzhok it was sent to the Kalinin Front on 22 December, where the 39th Army took part in the Kalinin Offensive Operation. The Kalinin Offensive Operation had begun on 5 December 1941 and was one part of the Moscow Strategic Counter-Offensive. The army was within the joint sector of the 22nd Army and 29th Army under the command of Lieutenant-General Ivan Maslennikov. At the end of December the 39th Army broke through the enemy defenses to a significant depth. During the battles of 2–7 January 1942 the troops on the right wing reached the Volga River and those in the center broke through a new line of defense organized by the enemy on the right bank of the Volga, covering Rzhev from the west and southwest. By the end of the operation on 8 January 1942 the 39th Army had reached the north-west of Rzhev.

The Sychyovka-Vyazma Offensive (8 January – 20 April 1942) began immediately and the 39th Army broke through the enemy defenses in a narrow sector, expanding its offensive on Sychevka and providing a corridor through the enemy front for the 29th Army and 11th Cavalry Corps (commanded by Colonel S.V. Sokolov). By the end of January 1942 its troops came to the Vyazma-Smolensk railway on the north of Yartsevo where they met stubborn resistance of the enemy troops. In early February the enemy counter-attacks from Rzhev and Olenino stopped the advance of Soviet troops and the Soviet troops on the Kalinin Front were forced into a defensive situation. This resulted in the Kholm-Zhirkovsky ledge being connected to the Kalinin Front by a narrow corridor between Nelidovo and Bely, where the 39th Army faced the threatening situation of having their lines of communication cut by the enemy. The 2nd Shock Army at the Volkhov Front was in a similar situation in the same time.

== Kalinin defense ==
From February to June 1942 the 39th Army was fighting in the north-west of Vyazma-Kholm-Zhirkovsky in a defensive role. Here the 39th Army engaged in the defense of a salient which contained an enormous enemy force, caused by the 9th Army who were involved in Operation Seydlitz. The German operation began on 2 July, against the troops of 39th Army and 11th Cavalry Corps, which occupied the Kholm-Zhirkovsky ledge. The Germans attacked at the narrowest part of the corridor, approximately 27–28 km, attacking in the direction of Bely and Olenino. By 6 July, the German troops had closed the corridor and the 39th Army and 11th Cavalry Corps were in encirclement and then dissected into two groups. By 8 July, the 11th Cavalry Corps were subordinated to the 39th Army. The German army ceased Operation Seydlitz when it "officially ended on 12 July, after reporting by radio from the Fuhrer's headquarters: 'The victory in the Summer Battle of Rzhev'."

== Evacuation and disbandment ==
On 17 July, around 8,000 troops of the 39th Army, under the command by Maslennikov, crossed the river Obshu (which passes the Bely from northeast to southwest) to land on the north bank and occupied the area north of the village Shizderevo. On 18 July, by order of the Kalinin Front commander, the military council of 39th Army with a group of staff officers and the wounded were evacuated in nine Po-2 light aircraft in Andreapol, of which three planes crashed. Surrounded parts of the 39th Army had been ordered to obey the Deputy of Maslennikov, Lieutenant-General Bogdanov, and the deputy of the political commissar of 39th Army, Division Commissar Shabalin. Battles continued for three weeks while the Germans tried to destroy the encircled groups of the 39th Army.

In late July 1942 the individual units were released from the front and, with no troops, the 39th Army was disbanded.

== Soviet invasion of Manchuria ==
On 1 May 1945, 39th Army was transferred to the Reserve of the Supreme High Command. That day, 39th Army rifle units consisted of 5th Guards Rifle Corps (17th, 19th and 91st Guards Rifle Divisions), 94th Rifle Corps (124th, 221st, and 358th Rifle Divisions), and 113th Rifle Corps (192nd, 262nd, and 338th Rifle Divisions). Artillery forces included the 139th Gun Artillery Brigade, 610th Anti-Tank Artillery Regiment, 555th Mortar Regiment, and the 621st Anti-Aircraft Artillery Regiment (зенап).

In May–June 1945 39th Army was relocated to Mongolia and on 20 June it was included in the Transbaikal Front under Marshal Rodion Malinovsky. It then took part in the Soviet invasion of Manchuria. In the Khingan–Mukden Offensive Operation (9 August - 2 September) Army troops attacked from Tamtsag-Bulagskogo protrusion forces Japanese Third Area Army Kwantung Army (30 A, 44 A), and the left flank of 4th Independent Army. After defeating the enemy, covering the approaches to the passes Greater Xing'an, the army seized Halun Arshansky-fortified area. Developing the offensive in the Changchun, advanced fought for 350–400 km, and taking Ulan-Hoto and Solon. By 14 August it had reached the central part of Manchuria. Expanding the offensive to the south, part of the army in conjunction with the 6th Guards Tank Army released on 19 August Mukden, 20 August - Changchun entered Kvantun and 21 August took Dalian, and on 22 August Port Arthur on the Chinese coast.

Some divisions of the 39th Army committed the notorious Gegenmiao massacre during the Manchuria Operation, torturing and killing thousands of Japanese civilians in August 1945.

== Cold War period ==
From 1945 to 1955 the 39th Army was stationed at Port Arthur. In Port Arthur was a naval base, the commander of which was Vice-Admiral Vasily A. Tsipanovich.

In Port Arthur was deployed the 113th Rifle Corps headquarters of Lieutenant General Tereshkov (338th Rifle Division - the area of Port Arthur, Dalny, 358th from the Far to the north boundary of the zone, 262 Rifle Division along the northern border of the peninsula, the headquarters of 5 Artillery Corps, 150th Fortified Region, 139 apabr. 7th Regiment separate communication provided connection between parts on the Liaodong, as well as Moscow and Vladivostok. Artillery Regiment, 48th Guards. SMEs defense regiment, IAP, Ballon ATO.

In the area of Jinzhou City headquarters stationed 5th Guards Rifle Corps Lt. Gen. L. Alekseyev, 19, 91 and 17th Guards Rifle Division under the command of Major General Eugene L. Korkutsa. Chief of Staff Lieutenant Strashnenko. The division includes the 21th separate battalion, on the basis of which the Chinese volunteers were trained. 26th Guards cannon artillery regiment, the 46th Regiment of Guards mortar, part of the 6th Division Artillery breakthrough torpedo regiment Pacific Fleet. At Dalihem (Dalian?) was based the 33rd gun Division Headquarters 7th BAC, air units, the 14th zenad, 119th Rifle Regiment guarded the port, plus elements of the Soviet Navy.

By the beginning of 1947, the 39th Army included the 5th Guards Rifle Corps (17th and 19th Guards Rifle Divisions, and 671st Artillery Brigade), the 25th Machine Gun Artillery, 7th Mechanized, and 6th Guards Breakthrough Artillery Divisions, the 33rd Gun Artillery and 14th Anti-Aircraft Artillery Divisions, and two army artillery brigades (the 55th Destroyer Anti-Tank and 139th Gun).

In 1948, the Shandong Peninsula, 200 kilometers from the Far, acting U.S. military base. Every day there appeared a reconnaissance plane and at low altitude on the same route flew over and photographed the Soviet and Chinese sites, airfields. Soviet pilots stopped the flights. Americans sent a note to the Foreign Ministry in a statement about the attack on the Soviet fighters "off course light passenger aircraft," but reconnaissance flights over Liaodong stopped. In June, 1948, in Port Arthur, a major joint exercise of all arms was undertaken. Malinovsky managed the whole exercise, from Khabarovsk arrived Stepan Krasovsky - Far East Air Force commander. Exercise was held in two main stages. On the ground - a reflection of marines imaginary enemy. The second - an imitation of massed bombing.

To address the issue of troop withdrawal in 1954 in Port Arthur Nikita Khrushchev arrived. He gave the military five months for withdrawal. 2 October 1954 a communiqué was signed on redeployment of the 39th Army and Navy units. By that time, the Soviet Union had in China six rifle and one mechanized division, a Division patrol boats, crew submarines, torpedo boats brigade, the brigade of water region, coastal defense forces and air defense, naval bombers (potentially including the 130th Maritime Torpedo Aviation Division) and fighter Air Division Air Corps (37th Fighter Aviation Division?). On 31 May 1955 and the deployment of troops over. Capital facilities and most of the equipment transferred to China. Almost everything was free of charge, including dozens of torpedo boats, tanks, submarines, all the ammunition. On the day of departure of troops solemn construction in parts where the Chinese gave the keys to the property. To the sound of the Soviet anthem was lowered naval flag of the Soviet Union, and then was replaced by a Chinese flag. Conclusion took 8 months. After retiring in Port Arthur for a while there were still Soviet specialists who taught Chinese sailors. Reduction and then disbanding the 39th Army began in 1955. The army and some of its units disbanded in September 1955 with the remainder transferring to the 5th Army.

After the war, the army was stationed for many years in Mongolia, with its headquarters at Ulaanbaatar. Soviet perceptions of threat from China increased in the 1960s. A number of measures were taken to increase troop strength in the Transbaikal and in Mongolia. From the Baltic to the Far East came the 21st Guards Tank Division, of the Leningrad Military District in the ZabVO – 2nd Guards Tank Division. It also deployed 5th Guards Tank Division, 32nd, 66th, 49th, and 111th Tank Divisions. By the early 1970s the 39th Combined-Arms Army had been strengthened in the Transbaikal, while in Mongolia there was formed a progressive group from the 39th Army. The 51st Tank Division arrived in Mongolia in 1974, transferred from the North Caucasus Military District.

In the late 1980s the army consisted of the 2nd Guards Tank Division, 51st Tank Division, and 12th, 41st, and 91st Motor Rifle Divisions. The withdrawal of troops from Mongolia took 28 months. On 4 February 1989 a Sino-Soviet agreement was signed to reduce troops on the border. 15 May 1989 and the Soviet government announced a partial, then the complete withdrawal of 39th Army of the Transbaikal Military District from Mongolia. The army consisted of more than 50,000 soldiers, 1816 tanks, 2531 armored vehicles, 1461 artillery systems, 190 aircraft and 130 helicopters. The last Russian troops left Mongolia on 15 September 1992.

== Commanding officers ==
- Major-General Ivan Aleksandrovich Bogdanov (11.1941 to 12.1941)
- Lieutenant-General Ivan Ivanovich Maslennikov (12.1941–07.1942)
- Lieutenant-General Ivan Aleksandrovich Bogdanov (22.07.1942-24.7.1942)
- Lieutenant-General Alexey Ivanovich Zygin (August 1942 – September 1943)
- Lieutenant-General Nikolai Berzarin (September 1943 – May 1944)
- Colonel-General Ivan Lyudnikov (27 May 1944 – June 1947)
- Colonel-General Afanasy Beloborodov (May 1947 – May 1953)
- Colonel General Vasily Shvetsov (May 1953 – September 1955)
