= Ivan Maslennikov =

Political Officer of B-59 Submarine

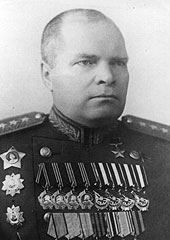
- Maslennikov in 1945
- Born: Ivan Ivanovich Maslennikov; 16 September 1900; Chalykla, Ozinsky District, Samara Governorate, Russian Empire
- Died: 16 April 1954 (aged 53); Moscow, Russian SFSR, Soviet Union
- Military career
- Allegiance: Soviet Union
- Service years: 1918–1954
- Rank: General of the Army
- Commands: 29th Army; 39th Army; North Caucasus Front; 8th Guards Army; 42nd Army; 3rd Baltic Front; Baku Military District; Transcaucasian Military District
- Conflicts: World War II; Battle of Moscow; Battle of the Caucasus; Tartu Offensive; Riga Offensive; Manchuria Offensive
- Awards: Hero of the Soviet Union

Ivan Ivanovich Maslennikov (Russian: Ива́н Ива́нович Ма́сленников; September 16, 1900 – April 16, 1954), General of the Army, was a Soviet military and NKVD commander of Army and Front level during World War II. A career Red Army officer, Maslennikov was transferred to NKVD system in 1928, and remained there until the German invasion of 1941, progressing from a counter-guerrilla squadron commander to the chief of NKVD troops. After a mixed career in field troops of World War II and three post-war years, Maslennikov returned to NKVD in 1948 and stayed there, despite political changes, until his suicide in 1954.

== Biography ==
=== Civil War and interwar period ===
Ivan Maslennikov, born on a remote railroad station in present-day Saratov Oblast, joined the pro-bolshevik Red Guards in 1917, fighting near Astrakhan. He served in the Red Army in southern theaters throughout the Civil War, progressing to commander of cavalry brigade in 1921. During the post-war demobilisation of the army, he accepted the lower role of squadron commander, and in 1928 was transferred from the regular army to OGPU Border Troops on the Central Asian frontier - initially commanding a squadron, later regiment. Maslennikov's units were instrumental in crushing the remaining basmachi warlords - Utan Beck (October 1928 - 1929), Ibrahim Beck (1931), Ahmet Beck (1933).

In 1935 colonel Maslennikov graduated at Frunze Military Academy and for the next two years was stationed with the Border Troops of Azerbaidzhan, then promoted to command Border Troops in Belarus. In February 1939, newly appointed NKVD chief Lavrentiy Beria promoted Maslennikov to the position of Deputy NKVD Commissar for the troops, placing him in control of Soviet Border Troops as well as Internal Troops. According to Sergo Beria, the choice was made based on the simple fact that Maslennikov was an experienced combat commander. The exact degree of Maslennikov's affiliation with Beria remains unknown; some modern authors tend to include Maslennikov in Beria's "inner circle" (with Bogdan Kobulov, Vladimir Dekanozov and others) based on circumstantial evidence (like Pavel Sudoplatov's account of his meeting with Beria in October 1939); others (Viktor Suvorov) treat him as a NKVD henchman despite his experience and formal training in the regular army.

Maslennikov's border troops took part in the occupation of Poland in September 1939. In October of the same year, Maslennikov was engaged in the planning of occupation of the Baltic states and in the German-Soviet commission on repatriation from former Poland and Baltic states. According to the German reports, Maslennikov openly admitted that the Soviets "need no wealthy Ukrainians and Belarusians, only the proletariat"; this, incidentally, led Germans to assume that the Soviets did not care about the Jews at all.

=== 1941–42: Winter offensive ===
In July 1941, when his troops on the western borders were crushed by the German offensive, lieutenant general Maslennikov was placed in command of the 29th Army, manned with NKVD staff and subordinate to Reserve Front HQ and later to Kalinin Front HQ. The move from Moscow offices to HQ in Bologoye occurred between July 4 (the date when Maslennikov approved a "Decree of prisoners of war") and July 6, when, according to future air marshal Sergei Rudenko, he was inspecting the Army's units. Despite the appointment, Maslennikov retained the position of one of nine deputies to NKVD commissar.

The Army first encountered German offensive July 21, falling back from Toropetz area to Rzhev; here it incorporated the remains of dismembered 31st Army. October 12, Germans enveloped the 29th Army, but it managed to break through to the northern bank of Volga. According to Ivan Konev, commander of Kalinin Front in October 1941, Maslennikov used Beria's influence to sabotage Konev's marching orders to 29th Army; Maslennikov's insubordination led to the fall of Tver.

On December 5, 1941, Maslennikov's 29th Army opened the offensive phase of Battle of Moscow, striking south-west from German-occupied Tver. 8 days later 29th and 31st armies closed the pocket around the city; it was taken December 16. However, in the beginning of the offensive Maslennikov was suddenly relieved of his command and assigned to command the newly formed 39th Army, concentrating in Torzhok area. Post-war Soviet sources give credits for taking Tver to general Vasily Yushkevich, commander of 31st army.

The 39th army lacked armor but was well manned by Soviet standards; its six infantry divisions averaged over 9,000 men each. January 7, 1942 the 39th army became a northern spearhead of the 1941-1942 winter offensive, piercing thin German front line in Torzhok area and proceeding south-west to Rzhev-Sychevka, crushing German 9th Army. 29th and 31st armies, following initial success of the 39th, were responsible for taking Rzhev, enveloping German Army Group Center. However, the Soviet pincers failed while Walter Model managed to restore the German front line. For half a year the 39th army operated deep in the German rear, relying on guerrilla tactics. In February 1942 the Germans destroyed the 29th army; Operation Seydlitz, launched June 30, led to complete isolation and dismemberment of the 39th army. By July 17, the army was reduced to 8,000 men; the next night Maslennikov and his staff, instructed by Stavka, escaped from the pocket in Po-2s. In the following week 3,500 men of 39th Army broke through to main Soviet forces; the rest perished.

=== 1942–43: Battle of the Caucasus ===
In the same July 1942, immediately after extraction from Rzhev pocket, Maslennikov reappeared in the South, leading a makeshift defence on the path of Evald von Kleist's troops advancing towards the Caucasus. This appointment is usually credited to Beria, himself engaged in the Caucasus (e.g.); recent studies assert that it was actually administered by Georgy Malenkov, operating separately from Beria, at least in the opening period of the battle.

Maslennikov's Northern Group, in charge of defending Terek Valley and Georgian Military Road soon incorporated the 9th, 37th and 44th armies, however, these armies were severely depleted of manpower and ammunition; when the troops encountered a German offensive in the middle of August, the 417th Rifle Division had only 500 active men. Later they were reinforced with 100 tanks, earmarked for Baku defense, and were the first to receive experimental infrared sights and silenced sniper rifles, however, the manpower shortage persisted into 1943. Consolidation of reserves, supervised personally by Joseph Stalin, enabled Maslennikov to check 1st Panzer Army advance in Terek valley and secure Baku oil.

January 4, 1943, Joseph Stalin changed Maslennikov's Northern Group task from counteroffensive action to tying up German troops, hoping that a static warfare would delay German withdrawal from the Caucasus and lead them into envelopement and destruction. Stalin reprimanded Maslennikov and Ivan Petrov (commander of Black Sea Group) for "not understanding this" and, three days later, for issuing unrealistic offensive orders to depleted troops leading to loss of control and potential envelopement by the Germans. Maslennikov regrouped his forces into a single strike at Armavir. Eventually, Kleist escaped the trap but failed to check Maslennikov's advance. January 22, his troops came in contact with the Southern Front and approached the railroad junction in Tikhoretsk. From this moment, Northern Group became an independent North Caucasus Front, with Maslennikov still in command, charged with a strategic task of cutting Kleist's lifeline in Bataisk. This ultimate goal never materialized: the Germans fiercely defended Bataisk, winning enough time to evacuate Army Group A.

=== 1944: Leningrad and the Baltic states ===
Maslennikov's career after the end of Battle of Caucasus (May 1943) was sketchy; in six months he changed four different commands (of Army commander and deputy Front commander level) until finally landing the command of 42nd Army of the Leningrad Front in December 1943; he would serve on the Baltic theater until the end of 1944, mostly in the role of commander of 3rd Baltic Front (under a false name Mironov).

The first attempt of 42nd and 67th armies to break the German Panther-Wotan line in Leningrad area (February–March 1944) failed; Stavka concentrated the forces for a second attempt under a newly formed 3rd Baltic Front HQ. In April–June 1944 the Front remained static. July 17, the Front launched an all-out attack against the Army Group North, from a concentration area near Pskov Lake to Pskov and further west. After a week of fighting, Germans abandoned Pskov; north from Lake Peipus, Leonid Govorov's troops captured Narva; this operation Maslennikov was promoted to the rank of General of the Army. August 10, Maslennikov's troops broke through the Marienburg Line, taking Võru on August 13. Before Valga and Tartu, the front was stopped again. It began concentrating forces to sever German forces in Latvia from their mainland. August 24 Count von Strachwitz's tank group attempted a counterstrike which failed; next day, Maslennikov's forces captured Tartu. September 15 the front launched an offensive towards Riga which, if successful, could isolate Army Group North. However, German resistance delayed capture of Riga until October 15; German 18th Army escaped the envelopment. The next day HQ of 3rd Baltic Front, now redundant, was dissolved.

=== 1945: Manchuria ===
Maslennikov's role in the Manchurian operation remains scarcely researched. Officially, he was the first deputy to Alexander Vasilevsky, commander-in-chief of Far Eastern forces; the operation earned Maslennikov the Star of Hero of Soviet Union. However, Vasilevsky memoirs on Manchurian operation don't even mention Maslennikov's name (unlike his account of 1944 events); to add to confusion, his namesake general Fyodor Maslennikov was also engaged in the operation as Chief of Staff, 1st Red Banner Army.

=== Personal accounts ===
Future Soviet Air Forces chief Konstantin Vershinin described Maslennikov's personal style of this period as "tough, sometimes ruthless". Lieutenant-general Bychevsky described Maslennikov in 1944 as a nervous, intolerant, gloomy character making unorthodox and unsound decisions.

General Konkov, his subordinate in Rzhev pocket of 1941-1942, gives an opposite account: "I felt sympathy for him at first sight. Lean, of less than average height, he maintained an even attitude to the men around him. Now imagine what it was like in those days with enemy left, right and behind, keen on crushing us."

According to Sergo Beria, Georgy Zhukov detested Maslennikov as a "guerrilla, not an Army commander" and appealed, in vain, to Lavrentiy Beria to remove his protege. However, his actual guerrilla and counter-guerrilla experience of the 1930s were an essential skill in the Caucasus.

Joseph Stalin himself in July 1944 made a curious remark, concerned that Maslennikov could fail his part in Operation Bagration: "Maslennikov is a young commander with a young staff and insufficient experience. He needs reinforcement by experienced gunners and pilots." - a surprising statement given Stalin's personal involvement with Maslennikov's operations in 1941 and 1942.

=== Post-war career ===
For the three years following World War II Maslennikov remained in the Army, as the deputy commander of Far Eastern forces and the commander of Baku and Transcaucasian military districts. In June 1948 Maslennikov was called back into NKVD system, then renamed MGB, and assumed his pre-war position of deputy MGB minister, commander of MGB troops. His exact function and scope of responsibilities varied during numerous reorganizations of the NKVD-MGB-MVD system; in February 1951, for example, his role was reduced to Internal Troops only; the new MVD never again concentrated as many troops in a single command as it was in 1939.

Maslennikov retained his position after the arrest of Lavrentiy Beria (June 1953) and summary executions of Beria and his key associates (December 1953). Alexander Solzhenitsyn mentions a general Maslennikov taking part in the appeasement of Vorkuta uprising (July 1953) that soon turned into mass shooting of rioting inmates.

However, in April 1954 he committed suicide, most likely fearing repressions for his long-term affiliation with Beria and NKVD in general. According to Pavel Sudoplatov, who witnessed a shattered Maslennikov in July 1953, Maslennikov had been subject to a lengthy interrogation about a non-existent plan of Beria's to take over absolute power using Maslennikov's troops. His suicide nearly a year later was a shock even for seasoned operatives like Sudoplatov, then incarcerated himself.

Maslennikov was never formally indicted (alive or posthumously) for any wrongdoing. While his name appeared frequently in Soviet books on World War II (seldom mentioning his NKVD past), he never became subject of a thoroughly researched biography.
