= Olenino, Ilyinsky District, Ivanovo Oblast =

Olenino Оленино
- Village
- Location within Ivanovo Oblast Location within Russia
- Coordinates: 56°57′N 39°50′E
- Country: Russia
- Region: Ivanovo Oblast
- District: Ilyinsky District
- Time zone: UTC+3:00

Olenino (Russian: Оленино) is a rural locality (a village) in Ilyinsky District, Ivanovo Oblast, Russia. Population: 119 (2010 census);

== Geography ==
This rural locality is located 4 kilometres (2.5 mi) from Ilyinskoye-Khovanskoye (the district's administrative centre), 68 kilometres (42 mi) from Ivanovo (capital of Ivanovo Oblast) and 190 kilometres (120 mi) from Moscow. Yakovlevskoye is the nearest rural locality.
