= 24th Cavalry Division (Soviet Union) =

- Active: 1935 – 21 June 1943
- Country: Soviet Union
- Type: Cavalry
- Role: Breakthrough and Exploitation in Deep Operations
- Engagements: World War II

The 24th Cavalry Division (Russian: 24-я кавалерийская дивизия) was a cavalry division of the Red Army during the interwar period and World War II. It was a prewar division assigned to the Transcaucasus Military District on 22 June 1941. The division was assigned there after participating in the Winter War.

== History ==
The 24th Cavalry Division was formed in accordance with a directive dated 25 August 1935, part of the 3rd Cavalry Corps of the Belorussian Military District. By 1 June 1936 it had been fully formed, manned at cadre strength, with 6,600 personnel. Based at Lepel, it included the 93rd, 94th, 95th, and 96th Cavalry Regiments, the 24th Mechanized Regiment, the 24th Horse Artillery Regiment, the 24th Separate Sapper Squadron, and the 24th Separate Communications Squadron. Kombrig Pyotr Antonov commanded the division from its formation until his arrest in January 1938 during the Great Purge; he was replaced in June of that year by Kombrig Pyotr Akhlyustin, who commanded the division until March 1941.

=== Invasion of Poland ===
The division participated in the Invasion of Poland during September and October 1939. The division was assigned to the Lepelskaya Group of the Belorussian Front's 3rd Army.

=== World War II ===
The division was awarded the name of Semyon Timoshenko as an honorific on 6 November 1940, becoming the 24th S.K. Timoshenko Cavalry Division (Russian: 24-я кавалерийская дивизия имени С. К. Тимошенко).

Assigned as an independent division in the Transcaucasus Military District when the war began. The division lost the 24th Tank Regiment in August 1941. The division was called forward to the STAVKA Reserves in October 1941. The division first went into action with the Kalinin Front's 30th Army north and west of Moscow.

On 1 January 1942 the division was assigned to the 11th Cavalry Corps. Despite being at 30% strength the division went on the offensive. While most of the 11th Cavalry Corps was destroyed in the spring and summer of 1942 the 24th Cavalry managed to survive as a separate division in various armies of the Kalinin Front. The division did send most of the remainder of 1942 in army and front reserves.

On 1 January 1943 the division was finally assigned to STAVKA reserves. The division was there for two months. However, it is unclear if the division received any reinforcements during this period. The division was sent to the Western Front where it remained in front reserves, out of combat until June. On 21 June 1943 the division was disbanded and used to reinforce the divisions of the 2nd Guards Cavalry Corps.

== Subordinate Units ==
- 18th Cavalry Regiment
- 56th Cavalry Regiment
- 70th Cavalry Regiment
- 135th Cavalry Regiment
- 24th Tank Regiment

== See also ==
- Cavalry Divisions of the Soviet Union 1917-1945
