= Olenino =

Olenino (Russian: Оленино) is the name of several inhabited localities in Russia.

== Urban localities ==
- Olenino, Tver Oblast, an urban-type settlement in Oleninsky District of Tver Oblast

== Rural localities ==
- Olenino, Ilyinsky District, Ivanovo Oblast, a village in Ilyinsky District, Ivanovo Oblast
- Olenino, Lukhsky District, Ivanovo Oblast, a village in Lukhsky District, Ivanovo Oblast
- Olenino, Nizhny Novgorod Oblast, a village in Dudenevsky Selsoviet of Bogorodsky District of Nizhny Novgorod Oblast
- Olenino, Novgorod Oblast, a village in Borovenkovskoye Settlement of Okulovsky District of Novgorod Oblast
- Olenino, Bezhanitsky District, Pskov Oblast, a village in Bezhanitsky District, Pskov Oblast
- Olenino, Palkinsky District, Pskov Oblast, a village in Palkinsky District, Pskov Oblast
- Olenino, Tula Oblast, a village in Bezhkovsky Rural Okrug of Leninsky District of Tula Oblast
- Olenino, Yaroslavl Oblast, a village in Povodnevsky Rural Okrug of Myshkinsky District of Yaroslavl Oblast
