= Sychyovka =

Sychyovka (Russian: Сычёвка) or Sychevka (Сычевка) is the name of several inhabited localities in Russia.

Urban localities

- Sychyovka, Sychyovsky District, Smolensk Oblast, a town in Sychyovsky District of Smolensk Oblast; administratively incorporated as Sychyovskoye Urban Settlement

Rural localities

- Sychevka, Altai Krai, a selo in Sychevsky Selsoviet of Smolensky District of Altai Krai
- Sychevka, Amur Oblast, a selo in Sychevsky Rural Settlement of Svobodnensky District of Amur Oblast
- Sychevka, Penza Oblast, a village in Saltykovsky Selsoviet of Zemetchinsky District of Penza Oblast
- Sychevka, Rostov Oblast, a khutor in Industrialnoye Rural Settlement of Kasharsky District of Rostov Oblast
- Sychevka, Monastyrshchinsky District, Smolensk Oblast, a village in Barsukovskoye Rural Settlement of Monastyrshchinsky District of Smolensk Oblast
- Sychevka, Tambov Oblast, a selo in Yaroslavsky Selsoviet of Nikiforovsky District of Tambov Oblast
- Sychevka, Arsenyevsky District, Tula Oblast, a village in Yasenkovsky Rural Okrug of Arsenyevsky District of Tula Oblast
- Sychevka, Uzlovsky District, Tula Oblast, a village in Fedorovskaya Rural Administration of Uzlovsky District of Tula Oblast
- Sychevka, Ulyanovsk Oblast, a village in Chebotayevsky Rural Okrug of Sursky District of Ulyanovsk Oblast
- Sychevka, Voronezh Oblast, a khutor in Khvoshchevatovskoye Rural Settlement of Nizhnedevitsky District of Voronezh Oblast
