= Kalinin Front =

Military unit

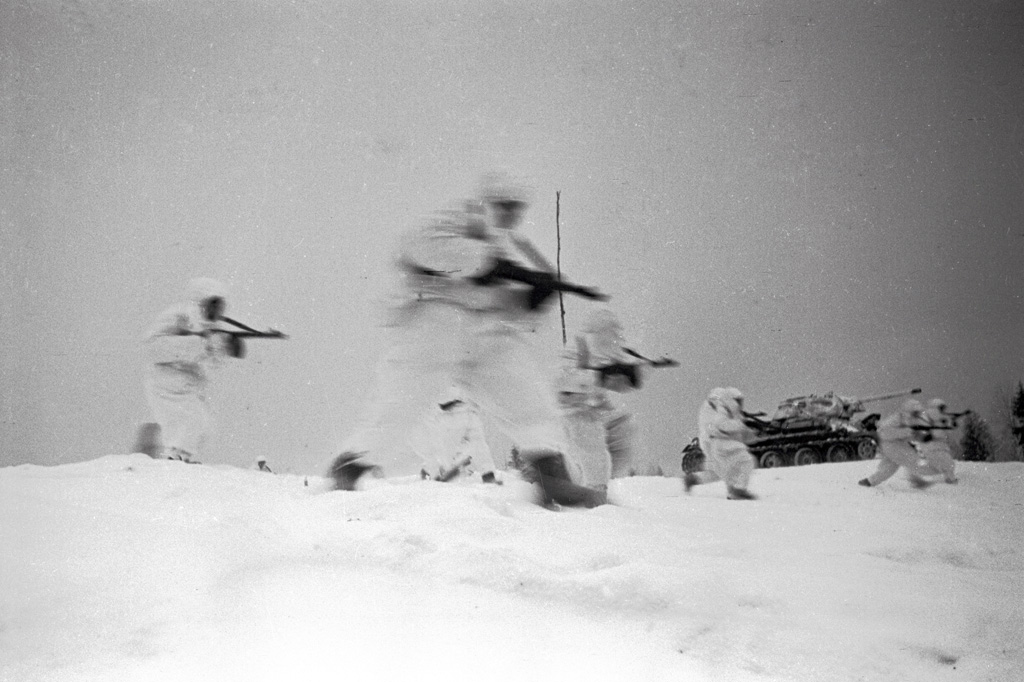
Submachine gunners of the Kalinin Front fighting near Staritsa, 1 February 1942

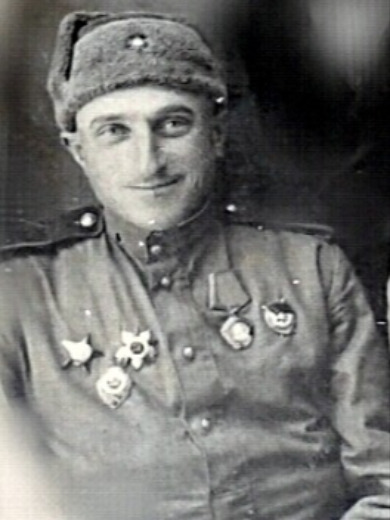
Sniper and Hero of the Soviet Union Vasil Kvachantiradze; he was part of the 43rd Army which was part of the Kalinin Front from 1 October 1942 onward

The Kalinin Front (Russian: Калининский фронт, romanized: Kalininskiy front) was a major formation of the Red Army active in the Eastern Front of World War II, named for the city of Kalinin. It was formally established by Stavka directive on 17 October 1941 and allocated three armies: 22nd, 29th Army and 30th. In May 1942, the Air Forces of the Kalinin Front were reorganised as the 3rd Air Army, comprising three fighter, two ground attack, and one bomber division.

In November 1942 the Kalinin Front, along with the Western Front, launched Operation Mars against the German defenses in the Rzhev/Vyaz'ma salient. The 3rd Shock Army, now allocated to the Kalinin Front, started the operation on 24 November by attacking the Third Panzer Army at Velikiye Luki, and the next day the Kalinin and Western Fronts assaulted the entire perimeter of the Rzhev salient. The offensive involved the 41st, 22nd, 39th, 31st, 20th, and 29th Armies from both Fronts. The Front was then involved in the Battle of Velikiye Luki in January–March 1943. The 3rd Air Army supported both the Rzhev/Sychevka and the Velikiye Luki operations, but then appears to have been shifted to the Northwestern Front briefly to cover the Demyansk bridgehead.

During the Nevel-Haradok operation, from 6 October—31 December 1943, the Front (which changed names halfway through) consisted of 3rd and 4th Shock, 11th Guards and 43rd Armies, plus the 3rd Air Army. Its initial strength was 198,000 men. The losses amounted to 43,551 dead and missing and 125,351 wounded and sick.

It was renamed the 1st Baltic Front in October 1943.

== Commanders ==
- Colonel-General Ivan Konev (October 1941 - August 1942)
- Lieutenant-General, from November 1942, Colonel-General Maksim Purkayev (August 1942 - April 1943)
- Colonel-General, since August 1943, Army General Andrey Yeryomenko (April - October 1943)
