= 145th Rifle Division =

145th Rifle Division (August 19, 1939 – August 28, 1941) 145th Rifle Division (January 19, 1942 - March 17, 1945)
- Active: 1939–1945
- Country: Soviet Union
- Branch: Red Army
- Type: Infantry
- Size: Division
- Engagements: Soviet invasion of Poland; Operation Barbarossa; Battle of Smolensk (1941); Smolensk operation Polotsk-Vitebsk offensive Operation Bagration; Vitebsk–Orsha offensive Baltic offensive Šiauliai offensive Operation Doppelkopf; Riga offensive (1944); Battle of Memel
- Decorations: Order of the Red Banner (2nd Formation)
- Battle honours: Vitebsk (2nd Formation)

Commanders
- Notable commanders: Maj. Gen. Aleksandr Alekseevich Volkhin; Maj. Gen. Fyodor Andreevich Volkov; Maj. Gen. Anisim Stefanovich Lyukhtikov; Maj. Gen. Pyotr Akimovich Dibrova; Maj. Gen. Vladimir Konstantinovich Gorbachyov

The 145th Rifle Division was originally formed as an infantry division of the Red Army in August 1939 in the Byelorussian Military District, based on the shtat (table of organization and equipment) of the following month. Less than a month after forming it took part in the Soviet invasion of Poland. At the outbreak of the war it was in the Oryol Military District, attempting to build up to wartime strength as part of the 33rd Rifle Corps, but by the beginning of July it had been assigned to 28th Army, soon being made part of a shock group known as Group Kachalov. Beginning in the third week of July this Group, under Western Front, started a combined arms drive to the north from the Roslavl area toward Smolensk. This push made very poor progress in a week of fighting before the Group was struck on the left flank by the XXIV Panzer Corps and quickly encircled. The men of the 145th were forced to break out as individuals and small groups, taking heavy losses in the process, and were then moved to the rear of Reserve Front, but it was decided to disband the division to reinforce its "sister" 149th Rifle Division.

A new 145th was designated in the Moscow Military District in January 1942, and was soon sent to the 4th Shock Army of Kalinin Front in the salient around Toropets which had recently been retaken. In April fighting near Velizh it was badly shot up and spent several months rebuilding on the defense. In October it was reassigned to 43rd Army of the same Front. During the summer offensive of 1943 that liberated Smolensk 43rd Army saw action against the left flank of German 4th Army, eventually helping to take the city before advancing to the western border of Belarus, where the 145th became involved in a months-long slog which threatened, but never quite broke the German hold on the city of Vitebsk. During this fighting it also served briefly in 39th Army, in what was now the 1st Baltic Front. Returning to 43rd Army it fought in the 1944 summer offensive that destroyed Army Group Center, for its part breaking into and clearing Vitebsk itself, for which it received a battle honor. During July it advanced into Lithuania and Latvia, the "Baltic Gap" that had formed between Army Groups Center and North, and distinguished itself in the fighting south of Riga in early October so as to be awarded the Order of the Red Banner. Shortly after it helped to lead the Army's advance on Memel, but this came to a halt outside the walls of the heavily fortified city. By now the Red Army was disbanding formations that were surplus to remaining requirements, and after moving to 2nd Guards, 4th Shock, and 51st Armies in Lithuania in early 1945 the 145th was written off in March in 2nd Baltic Front, with its remaining personnel and equipment going to the 158th Rifle Division.

== 1st Formation ==
The 145th officially formed on August 19, 1939, at Roslavl in the Byelorussian Military District, based on the 191st Rifle Regiment of the 64th Rifle Division. It was considered a "sister" unit to the 149th Rifle Division. It immediately came under command of Kombrig Aleksandr Alekseevich Volkhin, who would remain there until it was disbanded, with his rank being modernized to major general on June 4, 1940. The division was barely formed when it served in a supporting role during the invasion of eastern Poland. In the summer of 1940 it was moved to Belgorod in the Oryol Military District to take the place of the 185th Rifle Division. At the outbreak of war with Germany it was still in this District as part of the 33rd Rifle Corps, with the 89th and 120th Rifle Divisions. Its order of battle was as follows:

- 403rd Rifle Regiment
- 599th Rifle Regiment
- 729th Rifle Regiment
- 277th Artillery Regiment
- 516th Howitzer Artillery Regiment
- 255th Antitank Battalion
- 327th Antiaircraft Battalion
- 123rd Reconnaissance Battalion
- 213th Sapper Battalion
- 255th Signal Battalion
- 123rd Medical/Sanitation Battalion
- 151st Chemical Defense (Anti-gas) Company
- 300th Motor Transport Battalion
- 109th Field Bakery
- 165th Divisional Veterinary Hospital
- 257th Field Postal Station
- 273rd Field Office of the State Bank

At the end of June the division moved with its Corps to the Moscow Military District, where it was assigned to 28th Army, which was one of the separate armies of the STAVKA Reserve. This Army was under command of Lt. Gen. V. Ya. Kachalov.

== Battle for Roslavl ==
By July 10 the composition of 33rd Corps had changed to the 149th, 217th and 222nd Rifle Divisions. On July 17 the 145th was ordered to build defenses near its native Roslavl and to be prepared "to conduct active operations toward Smolensk." Later in the month, when 28th Army was incorporated into Western Front, most of its divisions were reassigned and it was being referred to as Group Kachalov. The Group consisted of the 149th and 145th Divisions plus the 104th Tank Division on July 21 as Army Group Center was trying to eliminate the Soviet forces that were partly encircled near Smolensk. The Group was ordered to "concentrate in the Krapivenskii, Vezhniki and Roslavl' region [110km south-southeast of Smolensk] by day's end" before attacking toward the city in the morning.

Marshal S. K. Timoshenko was in command of the Western Direction (the Fronts facing Army Group Center) and was charged by the STAVKA with counterattacking, especially to rescue the 16th and 20th Armies that were pocketed near Smolensk. German forces had already reached Yelnya, and Group Kachalov was ordered to protect its flank in that direction while advancing toward Pochinok as its intermediate objective. The 145th was supported by the 643rd and 364th Cannon Artillery Regiment and one battalion each of the 649th Cannon Artillery Regiment, the 489th Howitzer Artillery Regiment, and the 753rd Antitank Regiment. Volkhin was ordered to attack at dawn on July 23 to force German troops from the line of the Stomet River, take Vaskovo Station (17km south of Pochinok), and to cross the Khmara River on the Roslavl–Smolensk road. the 149th was to capture a line from Chernavka to Likhnovo, 25km southeast of Pochinok, before also crossing the Khmara. 104th Tanks was to conduct combined operations with both rifle divisions to seize Pochinok.

The counterattack developed in a staggered fashion on a 226km-wide front from Roslavl through Yartsevo to Bely in the north; coordination was impossible over such distances and many of Timoshenko's forces were not fully assembled. Group Kachalov struck the defenses of 18th Panzer Division. This division had lost a great deal of equipment over the preceding month but was quite capable of holding ground. Western Front reported at 2000 hours that:

Group Kachalov - dislodged enemy forward units by 1700 hours on 23 July and [is] now fighting for crossings over the Stomet' River, 18 kilometres southeast of Pochinok, but under constant attack by enemy aircraft.

Kachalov's headquarters was located at Stodolishche. The general was distraught over the failure of his force to accomplish much of anything and directed his chief of staff, Maj. Gen. P. G. Yegorov, to issue a scathing order to his forces criticizing their performance. Acknowledging the crossing of the Stomet, the order pointed out that the German forces had been able to withdraw, which was put down to an "inadequate tempo of advance" and reliance on frontal attacks, poor artillery support, and lack of reconnaissance. Kachalov ordered that these deficiencies be eliminated and that the two rifle divisions return to the attack at 0400 the next day to fulfill the original mission. These sorts of problems, stemming from lack of training and experience, could not be solved overnight, and Group Kachalov again only scored local successes, largely by the 145th along one line of advance. On the other hand, the 149th had not only failed to advance but had lost some ground taken the day before. Kachalov threatened:

The Military Council takes notice of and demands that commanders, commissars, and political workers directly control the fighting, be in their companies and battalions, and, in particular, when necessary, compel their units to fulfill their assigned mission by personal example.

Both divisions were to replace losses in the rifle companies with "detained stragglers" (men of the many formations defeated farther west who had evaded capture) and rear-area personnel.

The attack continued toward Pochinok with the 145th capturing Maslovka Station and Dmitrievka within 10km of the town. The 149th faced the stiffest resistance, reaching 20km south-southeast of Pochinok, while At 0100 hours on July 26 an exasperated Kachalov continued to press his forces to take the crossings over the Khmara. Volkhin was to reach the river on the Tsygankova Commune and Kiselevka sector by the end of the day. By 2100 Kachalov reported to Timoshenko that the 145th had reached a line from Osinovka to Poluevo to Barsukovskie Farm after minimal gains. Effectively admitting that his attack was stalled his orders for July 27 called for his Group to tie down the German forces near Osinovka and Barsukovskie Farm and continue to press to the Khmara. Volkhin was to keep at least two companies near Novyi Derebuzh while preparing to advance with the 149th. The attached 31st Composite Rifle Regiment was to assign one company to the 145th for reconnaissance purposes. As his overall counteroffensive wound down Timoshenko excused the failure of Group Kachalov to the arrival of German reinforcements, and emphasized that Yelnya had to be retaken.

At 2030 hours on July 27 Kachalov ordered his attack to continue the next day, but essentially with the same goals. Volkhin was told to protect a line from Dumanichskie to Novyi Derebuzh with one battalion while pushing to the Khmara. A composite regiment was to be released by the 222nd Division at Roslavl to reinforce the Group. Kachalov's force gained some 5km as German forces, now largely of the 263rd Infantry Division, fell back to more defensible lines. In fresh criticism he wrote:

It is intolerable that the forces of the group of 28th Army have been delayed for far too long while trying to overcome individual centers of resistance and firing points...
The units have marked time in place for four days and sometimes have been stopped in front of groups of motorcyclists or separate antitank guns.
I demand all commanders, political workers, and soldiers seize crossings over the Khmara River at all cost tomorrow on 29 July.

He then issued orders virtually identical to those previous. The 145th was to echelon two battalions of the 403rd Rifle Regiment behind its left wing, while holding two battalions of the 599th Regiment in divisional reserve. In addition, Volkhin was informed that an armored train would be arriving to support his attack. This was followed by more remedial tactical advice from General Yegorov. All of this was for naught as the offensive was effectively suspended.

=== Guderian's counterattack ===
2nd Panzer Group, and its commander, Gen. H. Guderian, had been watching events and looking for an opening. In the morning of August 1 the 3rd and 4th Panzer Divisions began a counterattack aimed at Roslavl with the intention of linking up with IX Army Corps attacking south from Pochinok. Late that day Timoshenko was still chiding Kachalov for his failure and demanding the drive on Pochinok continue, unaware of the danger approaching. The panzers immediately penetrated between the 8th and 148th Rifle Divisions of 13th Army on Kachalov's left flank, then turned east along the Roslavl road, with the 3rd taking up blocking positions on the road from that place to Krychaw, and the 4th moving straight on Roslavl. The left flank of the 222nd Division was turned, and IX Corps struck southward, threatening both flanks of Group Kachalov with envelopment.

Kachalov belatedly became aware of his predicament, and ordered several basic protective measures. He reported that "about 100 tanks and motorized infantry" had already pushed through to Zvenchatka on the Roslavl highway by 1710 hours, and he ordered the 145th to "reconnoiter to the west, defend your positions, and withdraw the 599th RR to the region 10 kilometres west of Stodolishche." Further instructions followed for commanders down to company level for antitank defense. These produced few useful results as the offensive developed at high speed on August 2, and by nightfall 4th Panzer was just 15km west of Roslavl, preparing to enter the city the next day. The 197th Infantry Division pushed the Group's left wing east toward the Pochinok–Roslavl road while also cutting the Roslavl–Smolensk road behind Kachalov's headquarters. Farther east, the 137th and 292nd Infantry Divisions pushed south halfway between the Desna River and the Roslavl–Smolensk road, which threatened to put the entire Group in a long pocket near Stodolishche. Kachalov now appreciated the threat to his right wing (the 149th and 104th Tanks) and began a regrouping in the evening, but in fear of judgement by higher headquarters he continued to insist on advancing to the north:

145th RD - defend the Hill 212.6, Hill 192.1, Osinovka, Moshek, Shantilovo, and Dumanichskie line with two regiments, concentrate two regiments [including the 31st Composite] in the Stodolishche, Barsukovskie, and Borshchevka region, and prepare to attack toward the west and south.

Such orders at this point were effectively suicidal. Meanwhile, due to sporadic communications Timoshenko was unable to inform the STAVKA of the full extent of the unfolding disaster. He reported that the division had been defending the Smychkovo and Zhigalovo line [8-10km northeast of Stodolishche, at 1300, and protecting a line from 6km northwest to 7km southwest of Stodolishche with one regiment.

With the fall of Roslavl and the blocking of the Moscow highway most of Group Kachalov was encircled. The 292nd Infantry, under Guderian's personal command, linked up with 4th Panzer just east of the village of Kosaki, 17km northeast of the city. As many of his rear area soldiers surrendered, Kachalov and his staff made desperate efforts to identify possible escape routes and organize shock groups to lead the breakout. Higher headquarters finally became aware of the true situation, if in vague terms, at 1730 hours. At 2030 the chief of the General Staff, Marshal B. M. Shaposhnikov, ordered Group Kachalov and the rest of 28th Army reassigned to Reserve Front, which was currently under command of Army Gen. G. K. Zhukov, effective 0600 on August 4. Zhukov immediately acted to rescue the Group as well as rebuild his defenses in the region. 43rd Army was to reinforce its line along the Desna with the fresh 258th Rifle Division while 24th Army was ordered to increase pressure on the German Yelnya grouping to deflect attention from Kachalov. At 0510 he sent precise instructions for the withdrawal to Kachalov. The left wing and center of the Group was to pull back to the Faddeeva Buda and Ostrik River line to link up with the 222nd. With Kachalov himself encircled, Lt. Gen. I. G. Zakharkin was ordered to take direction of the withdrawal from outside the pocket.

During the day both Kachalov and Yegorov were killed in action by German artillery fire near the village of Starinka as they tried to escape the encirclement. Maj. Gen. F. A. Zuev, Kachalov's deputy chief of staff, took command and ordered the remnants of the Group to withdraw at 1830 hours, while still maintaining the fiction that this was a preliminary to renewing the offensive. In fact, two sub-groupings were formed to break out to the east and southeast overnight. The 145th was part of the left column and was supposed to reach woods northeast of Staroe Kurgane by dawn on August 5. Zakharkin was ordered by Zhukov to "restore order to the remnants of Group Kachalov and place them in second echelon behind 53rd RD and assemble the remnants of 104th TD... [east of the Desna]." At 0028 on August 7 the Reserve Front headquarters issued a final report to Shaposhnikov on the fate of Group Kachalov based on the statements of survivors. Regarding the 145th it read:

Before the encirclement the... 145th RD [occupied] Poluevo, Kupreevka, Stodolishche, and Maloe Stodolishche [25-30km southeast of Pochinok]...
A group of enemy of unknown strength attacked from Krichev toward Maloe Stodolishche against 145th RD's left flank... By the evening of 2 August the enemy pushed 104th TD's right wing back and strengthened its activity on 149th RD's front... The enemy group attacking from the direction of Khislavichi actively operated against 145th RD's left flank.
At day's end... the commander [Kachalov] decided to withdraw, and, as a result... 145th RD was to withdraw [southeastward] through Misovka, Dubrovka, Starinka, Dorotovka, and Rakovka and further to the east... The 28th Army's headquarters was to move behind the 145th RD.
The forces began fulfilling the order to withdraw at 2000 hours on 2 August. The first encounter with the enemy during the withdrawal occurred at 0300-0400 hours on 3 August near the village of Starinka, where fierce fighting continued through 1700-1800 hours...
Kachalov remained in the village of Starinka to restore order, while 145th and 149th RDs' forces moved [southeast] trying to punch through toward Ermolino [3km southeast]... Group Kachalov escaped in broken up separate groups. Measures are being taken to search for the remaining units...

From German records it appears that after completing the encirclement on August 4 the pocket was effectively liquidated within 48 hours. General Volkhin escaped, but only a small number of his men were able to do the same, and while the 145th was officially assigned to 43rd Army, in Reserve Front, on August 10, the STAVKA chose to not rebuild it, and on August 28 it was disbanded, with the survivors being incorporated into the 149th. Volkhin was given command of the 16th Reserve Rifle Brigade, then the 147th Rifle Division, which was encircled and destroyed west of the Don River a year later, which led to him being tried and condemned to death, with the sentence being changed to 10 years "imprisonment" to be served at the front. He later restored his reputation and held several other commands, including briefly the 45th Rifle Corps, during the war.

== 2nd Formation ==
A new division, preliminarily numbered the 319th, was formed at Balachna in the Moscow Military District in December, but on January 19, 1942, was redesignated as the new 145th. On the same day Col. Fyodor Andreevich Volkov took command; he would be promoted to the rank of major general on May 3. Its order of battle was very similar to that of the 1st formation:

- 403rd Rifle Regiment
- 599th Rifle Regiment
- 729th Rifle Regiment
- 277th Artillery Regiment
- 255th Antitank Battalion
- 123rd Reconnaissance Company
- 213th Sapper Battalion
- 255th Signal Battalion (later 541st Signal Company)
- 129th Medical/Sanitation Battalion
- 151st Chemical Defense (Anti-gas) Company
- 160th Motor Transport Company
- 109th Field Bakery
- 868th Divisional Veterinary Hospital
- 1711th Field Postal Station (later 1523rd)
- 1051st Field Office of the State Bank

In February it was sent to Kalinin Front, where it was assigned to 4th Shock Army. It became active at the front on February 26.

During late January, during the winter counteroffensive, 4th Shock had reached the outskirts Velizh, but had been unable to take the town due to a desperate German defense. During April 17-21 the division took part in fighting for the village of Milovidy, 12km southwest of Velizh, and suffered huge casualties due to a failure of artillery support. Over the following months it remained on the defense, rebuilding with refugees from the Smolensk area. In October it was reassigned to 43rd Army, still in Kalinin Front.

During this month General Zhukov and the STAVKA were planning for a new offensive by Western and Kalinin Fronts, designated Operation Mars, against the Rzhev salient held by German 9th Army. It was intended that, in case of success, it would be followed by a further operation, called either Jupiter or Neptune, involving 43rd and 4th Shock of Kalinin Front, plus 5th and 33rd Armies of Western Front. As the 145th joined 43rd Army it received a planning document from that headquarters:

1. The mission of the army: Destroy the opposing enemy units, reach the Demidov (incl.), Kholm, and Dukhovshchina (incl.) front, and sever enemy communications to Smolensk... Be prepared to begin the operation on 12 October 1942...

Mars was postponed several times, but a further directive from the Army commander, Lt. Gen. K. D. Golubev, on November 5 makes clear the 145th, 32nd, and 306th Rifle Divisions, plus the 2nd Mechanized Corps, would lead the attack. All this was dependent on the success of Mars, which did not eventuate.

== Operation Suvorov ==
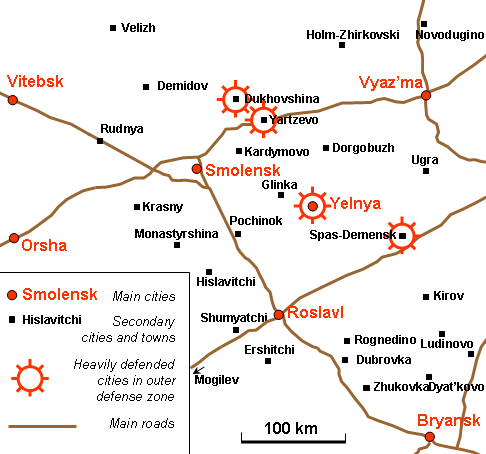
General layout of the Smolensk region during the offensive

Through the winter and spring of 1943 the 145th was involved in battles of local significance in the Demidovsky District until the spring rasputitsa brought operations to a halt. The relative calm continued on this front until after the defeat of the German summer offensive at Kursk. Kalinin and Western Fronts now prepared for their own offensive to liberate Smolensk. as of August 1, 43rd Army consisted of four rifle divisions (145th, 179th, 262nd, 306th), 114th Rifle Brigade, 5th Fortified Region, and the 105th Tank Regiment. The main part of the offensive would be conducted by Western Front, under command of Col. Gen. V. D. Sokolovskii.

That Front kicked off the offensive on August 7, and Kalinin Front, led by Col. Gen. A. I. Yeryomenko, joined at 0730 hours on August 13, striking the XXVII Army Corps of German 4th Army 8km northeast of Dukhovshchina. The Front's attack was led by 39th Army, and 43rd Army supported its right with two divisions and the 105th Tanks. XXVII Corps had three divisions on a 40km-wide front with one more in reserve. All were understrength but had the advantage of the well-constructed lines of the Barbarossa-Stellung. Kalinin Front had been suffering shortages of ammunition for a long time, and the artillery preparation was limited to 35 minutes, insufficient to suppress the defense. 43rd Army managed to capture two villages in the front line, but overall the attackers gained only about 1,500m before being halted by counterattacks. This was followed the next afternoon by German air attacks against 39th Army which further stymied the offensive. In four days of fighting Kalinin Front gained just 3km without reaching any of its objectives, but XXVII Corps lost about one-third of its infantry and was heavily overstretched, even with the arrival of 25th Panzergrenadier Division. On August 20 General Volkov left the 145th to take command of the 91st Rifle Corps where he remained for the duration of the war, becoming a Hero of the Soviet Union on April 6, 1945. He was replaced by Maj. Gen. Anisim Stefanovich Lyukhtikov, who had previously led the 348th Rifle Division and the 31st Rifle Brigade.

On August 21 Sokolovskii was given permission to suspend the offensive for a week to rest and replenish. In this opening stage Kalinin Front alone had probably lost some 10,000 casualties. The second phase began on August 25 on Yeryomenko's sector as a reinforced 39th Army again struck XXVII Corps, but with similarly limited results after five days of battle. Yeryomenko now requested more artillery ammunition and 12 days to replenish his units. According to his memoirs he was now "seriously worried that the offensive was fading." Stalin was unimpressed and ordered the attack to continue. Western Front resumed its attacks on August 28 and made greater progress than previously, but Sokolovskii was forced to suspend his offensive again on September 7 due to logistics.

Yeryomenko now made several major changes in his approach; knowing that XXVII Corps had been reinforced with the 1st SS Infantry Brigade northeast of Dukhovshchina he switched to 43rd Army to lead the next assault. 91st Corps (179th and 306th Divisions) successfully attacked the left flank of 256th Infantry Division on the morning of September 13, and the Army made a subsequent advance to take the town of Bedenki. The next morning 39th Army struck near Spas-Ugly with four divisions and breached the German front. Yeryomenko now committed his mobile forces, which caused the weakened 52nd Infantry Division to collapse. Red Army vehicles were soon reported in the German rear. During September 15, 43rd Army eroded the positions of the 256th Infantry and took the town of Ribshevo. The right flank of XXVII Corps was still anchored by 25th Panzergrenadiers, but otherwise the situation was fluid. Late in the afternoon it was authorized to pull back to the first line of the Hubertus-Stellung, with the two Soviet Armies in pursuit.

It soon became apparent that the first line of Hubertus was untenable, and Dukhovshchina was occupied by 17th Guards Rifle Division in the morning of September 17. The door was now open to Smolensk. The Hubertus-III-Stellung seemed viable until 68th Army managed a breakthrough southeast of the city, and 43rd Army took Demidov, threatening to turn the left flank of 4th Army. As of 2030 hours on September 23 this line was also abandoned. Smolensk was retaken on September 25, and the forces of the two Fronts advanced on Belarus.

== Battles for Vitebsk ==
At about this time the 145th became part of 1st Rifle Corps, in the same Army and Front. It was joined under this command by the 204th and 262nd Divisions. It would remain in this Corps for most of the rest of its existence. It was now facing elements of the VI Army Corps of 3rd Panzer Army.

Kalinin Front had been directed by the STAVKA to capture Vitebsk by October 10 but it soon became clear that this objective was well out of reach. General Golubev had his 1st and 91st Corps deployed abreast with orders to attack through the town of Kałyški, at the boundary of the German 14th and 206th Infantry Divisions. On October 3 the 262nd Division and 105th Tank Regiment managed to penetrate the defenses north of Kałyški, advanced to the town's northern outskirts the next day and soon liberated it, while the 145th took the strongpoint at Saptsy. On October 8 the 204th, supported by 46th Mechanized Brigade, tore a small hole through the 206th Infantry's defenses west of Kałyški after an advance by the Corps of roughly 8km but was only able to gain another 1000m. The offensive to date had cost Kalinin Front considerable casualties and was halted around October 16.

=== Polotsk–Vitebsk Offensive ===
1st Baltic Front began its Polotsk–Vitebsk offensive on November 2. The 43rd and 39th Armies were ordered to concentrate their forces north of the Smolensk–Vitebsk railroad and highway facing the 14th and 206th Divisions. They were to attack west toward Vitebsk on November 8 with the goal of linking up with 4th Shock Army advancing south from Haradok. Golubev deployed his 1st Corps on the left and 91st Corps on the right with the 92nd Rifle Corps in a flanking role and launched a heavy assault against the German defenses south of Janavičy. The attack tore a gaping hole in these defenses, again at the junction of the two German divisions. A combined push by both Armies the next day enlarged the gap to a width of 10km and by evening lead elements of the attacking force reached Poddube just 10km east of the defense lines around Vitebsk proper. The 206th Infantry's defensive front was by now a shambles and the 14th's right flank was both turned and wide open. Despite this the 43rd Army's attacks were contained at Poddube on November 11 while the 39th Army gained another 5km before being halted by counterattacks.

By November 17 the defenders had managed to restore a fairly continuous front west of Poddube, Karamidy and Argun and the Soviet assault expired in exhaustion. Late in the month the 1st Corps, now consisting of just the 204th and 145th, was transferred along with its sector to the 39th Army in preparation for a further effort in December. As of December 13 the 5th Guards Rifle Corps and 1st Rifle Corps of 39th Army, with the 43rd Army's 92nd Corps, were facing the three divisions of VI Corps on a 50km-wide sector on both sides of the Smolensk–Vitebsk railway and highway. The renewed offensive began on December 19 when the combined forces of 39th and 43rd Armies struck the defenses of the 14th Infantry. Both divisions of 1st Corps were in first echelon and were supported by the 39th Guards Tank and 47th Mechanized Brigades. Together the two Armies drove the German forces back up to 3km on an 8km-wide front by day's end. The next day the second echelon forces were committed but German reserves limited the advance in heavy combat that went on until December 23 when heavy losses again forced a halt. Before the end of the month the 1st Corps was transferred back to 43rd Army where it went on the defensive facing the 3rd and 4th Luftwaffe Field Divisions and roughly half of the 14th Infantry. 1st Corps returned to 43rd Army later that month, but in February 1944 the 145th came under direct Army command.

In order to preempt a further offensive on Vitebsk, overnight on February 29/March 1, 1944, the commander of 3rd Panzer Army, Col. Gen. G.-H. Reinhardt, pulled back much of his force back to a line closer around the city. On March 3 the 145th, along with two divisions of 92nd Corps, launched probing attacks against 4th Luftwaffe near Losvida and Savchenki, but were rebuffed sharply. On April 6 General Lyukhtikov left the division to take command of the 60th Rifle Corps, which he would lead into the postwar. During 1953-55 he would serve for two years as senior military advisor to the Hungarian Army before his retirement. He was briefly replaced by Col. Leonid Timofeevich Sochilov, who had been serving as deputy chief of military training for 43rd Army, but he was superseded on April 27 by Maj. Gen. Pyotr Akimovich Dibrova. This officer had largely served in staff assignments but after a five-month course at the Voroshilov Academy he was given command of the 15th Reserve Rifle Brigade before arriving at the 145th.

== Operation Bagration ==
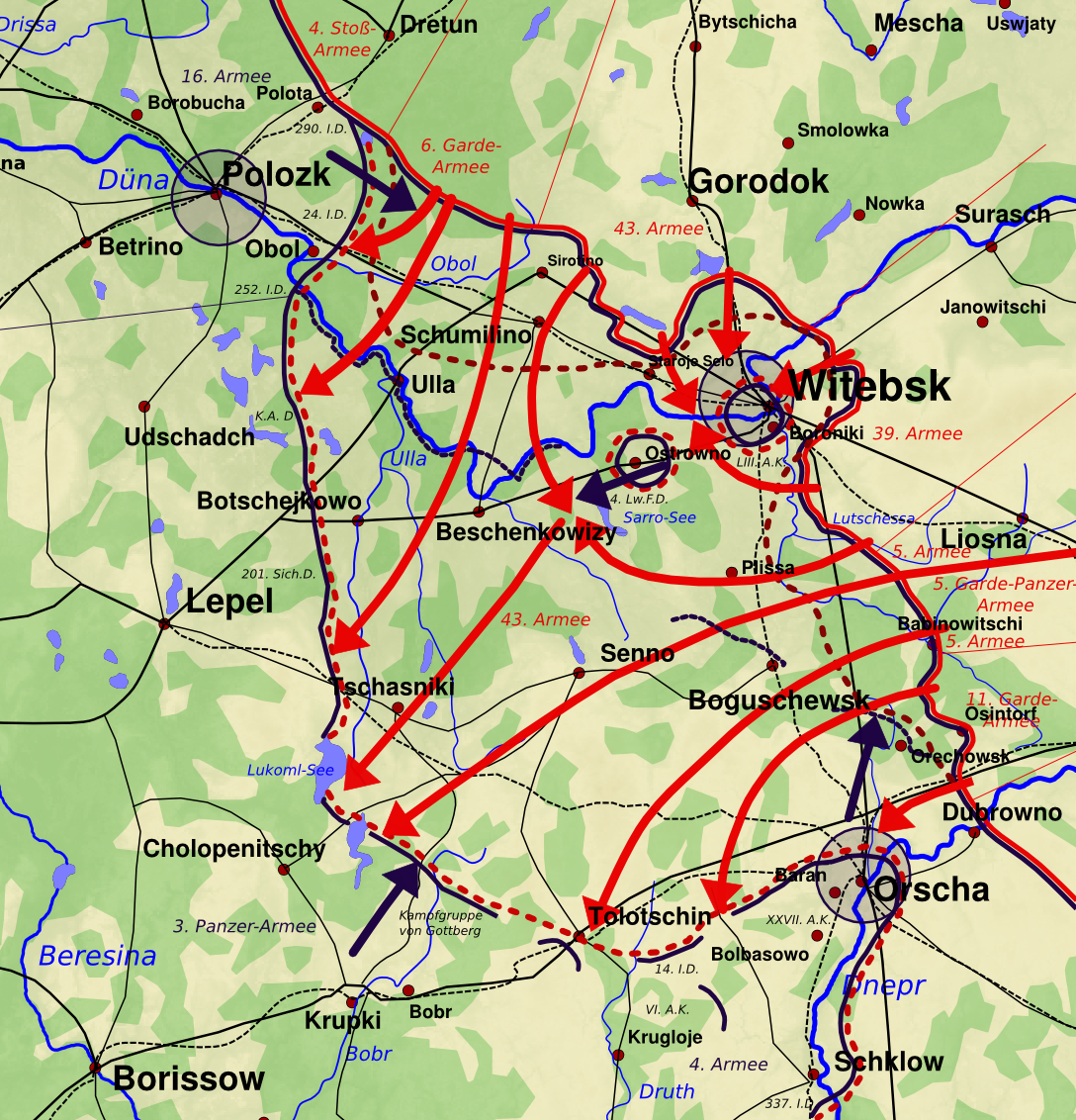
Vitebsk-Orsha Offensive.

During March the division had been transferred to 92nd Corps, still in 43rd Army. It was still under these commands at the start of the summer offensive against Army Group Center. 92nd Corps had only the 145th and 204th Divisions on strength. The Army commander, Lt. Gen. A. P. Beloborodov, gave the Army's main task of attacking from the north to the 1st and 60th Corps with considerable armor and artillery support. 92nd Corps was to defend the front from Chisti to Koitovo and be ready to launch an attack in the direction of the village of Staroe Selo; it was intended to pin the German LIII Army Corps in Vitebsk while the other two Corps encircled the salient in cooperation with 39th Army.

1st Baltic Front's offensive began at 0400 hours on June 22 following a very heavy artillery preparation lasting 20 minutes. While the attacking Corps of 43rd Army badly damaged the German 252nd Infantry Division and Corps Detachment "D" the perimeter around Vitebsk was relatively quiet, limited to artillery strikes and minor attacks by 92nd Corps and the adjacent 84th Rifle Corps of 39th Army. The commander of Army Group Center requested permission to withdraw to shorten the line, but Hitler would not agree. On the second day the 1st and 60th Corps made even greater progress than on the first while 92nd Corps remained relatively quiet until early evening when Hitler authorized the city's garrison to pull back to the third defense zone and the Corps followed up, pressing south to reach the west bank of the Dvina River on June 24. Late that day Hitler authorized three of the four divisions of LIII Corps to hold open the road to the west but insisted that the 206th Infantry remain in Vitebsk. This made little difference as just before midnight the city was encircled and 35,000 German soldiers were trapped. Breakout attempts on June 25 saw only limited success and during the next day the 92nd, 60th and 84th Rifle Corps steadily reduced the pocket. The 145th broke into the city itself and cleared out its northwestern sector. By 1100 hours the next day it had taken its entire western part and mopped up the north bank of the Dvina. In recognition of its achievements in this offensive, the division was awarded its honorific:

VITEBSK... 145th Rifle Division (Maj. General Dibrova, Pyotr Akimovich)... By order of the Supreme High Command of 26 June 1944, and a commendation in Moscow, the troops who participated in the liberation of Vitebsk are given a salute of 20 salvoes by 224 guns.

During June 29–30 both the 60th and 92nd Corps overcame resistance along 43rd Army's front, including that of the recently committed 212th Infantry Division, and covered 28–36km over those two days. The next day Beloborodov was directed to leave two divisions of 1st Corps on his left flank and advance with his remaining forces to the northwest to outflank Lake Sho from north and south and head in the direction of Glubokoe. Polotsk was cleared by 6th Guards Army on July 4, leaving the defenders falling back on the right bank of the Dvina. The previous day, 92nd Corps, in cooperation with units of 1st Tank Corps, had taken Glubokoe.

== Baltic Offensives ==
By July 8 the 43rd Army had advanced deeply into the so-called "Baltic Gap" that had developed between Army Group Center and Army Group North and was approaching Švenčionys in Lithuania. By July 22 a favorable situation had come about for 1st Baltic and 3rd Belorussian Fronts to develop the offensive toward Daugavpils, Panevėžys, and Šiauliai. The German grouping in and around Daugavpils was facing encirclement, and chose to attack the forces of 1st Baltic between there and Šiauliai, primarily 92nd and 1st Corps, in an effort to escape. The attackers included 11th SS Division Nordland, 58th and 225th Infantry Divisions, 393rd Assault Gun Brigade, and other units. Despite this, 51st Army was successful in taking Panevėžys the same day. Under the circumstances, with 43rd Army resisting successfully, on July 24 the commander of 1st Baltic Front, Army Gen. I. K. Bagramyan, chose to continue advancing with his remaining forces in an effort to cut off not just the Daugavpils grouping, but all of Army Group North, from its communications with East Prussia.

The Front's situation improved further on July 25 as 4th Shock Army, now in 2nd Baltic Front, moved up to Daugavpils and prepared to take it by storm, and the counterattacks against 43rd Army had almost totally ended. 51st and 2nd Guards Armies advanced along the Panevėžys–Šiauliai axis without serious opposition and were threatening to reach the Gulf of Riga. Beloborodov was ordered to maintain his current positions while also preparing to move to the northwest. On July 27 the German Daugavpils grouping began a hurried retreat in the same direction, and the city fell to 4th Shock, but 43rd Army had little success when it attacked in the afternoon. The next day the 43rd and 51st Armies opened the Šiauliai–Riga operational axis, but their forces were scattered along a 206km-wide frontage. The 43rd pushed ahead 20km on July 28 before increasing resistance forced a halt. On the morning of July 31 the 3rd Guards Mechanized Corps took the town of Tukums and cut the remaining road from Germany to Army Group North. At this time the 145th was in the vicinity of Kupiškis.

On August 16 the two German Army Groups launched a major attack to reopen the supply lines, Operation Doppelkopf. At this time the 145th was located east of Bauska; once this ended on August 27 the division returned to 1st Corps, still in 43rd Army. In his memoirs, Beloborodov commented with approval on the success of the division and Dibrova in the advance following the German counterattack, during which it cut the rail line from Krustpils to Mitava, receiving official thanks from the STAVKA. In the advance on Tekava and Baldone the 145th officially accounted for 28 tanks and 16 armored personnel carriers up to around September 18. On September 23 Dibrova was severely wounded in the left arm and hospitalized for many months; he would not return to the front. The next day he was replaced by Maj. Gen. Vladimir Konstantinovich Gorbachyov, who had previously led the 202nd Motorized Rifle and 262nd Rifle Divisions, but had more recently been deputy commander of 92nd Corps.

Although the connection between the two Army Groups had been restored, the 1st and 2nd Baltic Fronts now set out to finally isolate Army Group North and take Riga. In mid-September the 156th was still in the Bauska area, some 66km from Riga. By October 5 it had moved with its army to the vicinity of Radviliškis in Lithuania. Riga fell on October 13 and on October 22 the division would be awarded the Order of the Red Banner for its role in the battles southeast of the city. Prior to this the 43rd Army had been redirected toward Šiauliai. On September 29 it was ordered to advance in the general direction of Memel, with six divisions in first echelon and six more in second. In recognition of its part in the fighting near Šiauliai the 599th Rifle Regiment was also awarded the Red Banner on October 31.

=== Advance on Memel ===
Overnight on October 3/4 the 1st, 19th, and 92nd Rifle Corps were deployed on an attack frontage some 9km wide while 90th Rifle Corps covered the Army's left flank frontage of 35km. However, due to heavy rain and mist the offensive was delayed until 1100 hours on October 5. Kuršėnai was soon cleared as the resistance of the 551st Volksgrenadier Division collapsed, and advance battalions of the 145th and 306th crossed the Venta River. However, over the next two days the 92nd Corps was delayed at Lukniki, in part by the arrival of elements of Großdeutschland Division, this complicated the advance of 1st Corps as it left its right flank open. However, by October 9 the Minija River had been forced by the Front's forces. Army Group North was again cut off by this time, and a German grouping of some 18 battalions and 40 tanks and self-propelled guns, under command of XXXX Panzer Corps, was falling back into the stout defenses of Memel. The first attack against these went in on October 11, but the Army did not have enough heavy artillery to make much impression as 92nd Corps made its way to the coast to cut the city off from the northeast. On October 13 the Army went over to the defense.

=== Disbandment ===
During November the 1st Corps was transferred to 2nd Guards Army, still in 1st Baltic Front. In December it was moved again, now to 4th Shock Army, and in January 1945 to 51st Army. In February the 145th was reassigned to 14th Rifle Corps which was directly under command of 2nd Baltic Front. On March 17 it was judged as being surplus to requirements and was disbanded with its personnel, equipment, decoration and battle honor being transferred to the 158th Rifle Division of the same Corps. General Gorbachyov was moved to command of the 346th Rifle Division within days and would end the war in this post. During the remainder of his career he led the 321st Rifle Division and a pair of rifle brigades before retiring on December 18, 1948.
