= 204th Rifle Division =

204th Motorized Division (March 1941 – September 19, 1941) 204th Rifle Division (October 1, 1941 – March 1, 1943) 204th Rifle Division (May 1943 – February 1946)
- Active: 1941–1946
- Country: Soviet Union
- Branch: Red Army
- Type: Infantry
- Role: Motorized Infantry
- Size: Division
- Engagements: Operation Barbarossa; Battle of Białystok–Minsk; Battle of Stalingrad; Operation Uranus; Operation Ring; Battle of Kursk; Smolensk-Roslavl Offensive Operation; Polotsk–Vitebsk Offensive; Operation Bagration; Vitebsk-Orsha Offensive; Baltic Offensive; Šiauliai Offensive; Riga Offensive (1944); Memel Offensive; Courland Pocket
- Battle honours: Vitebsk (2nd Formation)

Commanders
- Notable commanders: Col. Aleksei Mikhailovich Pirov; Col. Andrei Pavlovich Karnov; Maj. Gen. Aleksandr Vasilevich Skvortsov; Maj. Gen. Ksaverii Mikhailovich Baydak

The 204th Rifle Division was twice formed as an infantry division of the Red Army after a motorized division of that same number was destroyed in the first weeks of the German invasion of the Soviet Union. The first formation was based on the shtat (table of organization and equipment) of July 29, 1941, and it then remained for nine months in the far east of Siberia training and organizing before it was finally sent by rail to the Stalingrad region in July 1942 where it joined the 64th Army southwest of the city. During the following months it took part in the defensive battles and later the offensive that cut off the German 6th Army in November. In the last days of the battle for the city it took the surrender of the remnants of a Romanian infantry division. Following the Axis defeat the division was recognized for its role when it was redesignated as the 78th Guards Rifle Division on March 1, 1943.

A new 204th was raised in May 1943 in Voronezh Front under the "shtat" of December 10, 1942, based on a former "student" rifle brigade. After seeing brief service in 38th Army during the Battle of Kursk the division was moved northward, becoming part of the 1st Rifle Corps of 43rd Army in Kalinin Front (soon 1st Baltic Front) and saw combat in the slow and bloody battles east and north of Vitebsk through the winter. Early during the summer offensive against Army Group Center the 204th distinguished itself in the capture of that city and received its name as an honorific. It then took part in the campaigns through the Baltic states, moving to the 51st Army in August where it remained for the duration of the war, mostly in the 1st Guards Rifle Corps. Like many other rifle divisions on this secondary front by January 1945 it was well under strength but continued to serve, eventually as part of the force blockading the German units remaining in the Kurland peninsula as part of 2nd Baltic Front and then Leningrad Front. The division was disbanded in February 1946.

== 204th Motorized Division ==
The division began forming in March 1941 as part of the prewar buildup of Soviet mechanized forces, based on the 9th Armored Car Brigade at Volkovysk in the Western Special Military District as part of the 11th Mechanized Corps. Once formed its order of battle was as follows:

- 700th Motorized Rifle Regiment
- 706th Motorized Rifle Regiment
- 126th Tank Regiment
- 657th Artillery Regiment
- 193rd Antitank Battalion
- 158th Antiaircraft Battalion
- 682nd Reconnaissance Battalion
- 382nd Light Engineering Battalion
- 583rd Signal Battalion
- 202nd Artillery Park Battalion
- 358th Medical/Sanitation Battalion
- 675th Motor Transport Battalion
- 111th Repair and Restoration Battalion
- 51st Regulatory Company
- 463rd Chemical Defense (Anti-gas) Company
- 921st Field Office of the State Bank

Col. Aleksei Mikhailovich Pirov was appointed to command on March 11. The division had only one battalion of 44 BT-5 tanks in the 126th Regiment but was full strength in armored cars left over from its service as the 9th Brigade. In common with most of the motorized divisions it was grossly deficient in transport, with almost no tractors and less than 15 percent of its authorized trucks so the rifle regiments were largely on foot and the 657th, which was understrength, (8 76mm cannons, 16 122mm howitzers, 4 152mm howitzers) was unable to move many of the pieces it did have.

On June 22 the 11th Mechanized Corps (29th and 33rd Tank Divisions, 204th Motorized, 16th Motorcycle Regiment) was under command of 3rd Army in the renamed Western Front. The 204th was near the base of the Białystok salient and was split with its main forces north of Volkovysk beginning to move northward during the day and a forward detachment backing the two tank divisions south of Grodno. During this move the division came under heavy air attacks and lost over half of its equipment. Within days it had been overrun and destroyed in the Białystok pocket with most of the rest of 11th Corps, although it was not officially stricken from the Red Army order of battle until September 19.

== 1st Formation ==
A new division began forming as a regular rifle division on October 1, 1941, at Blagoveshchensk in the Far Eastern Front with a similar order of battle:

- 700th Rifle Regiment
- 706th Rifle Regiment
- 730th Rifle Regiment
- 657th Artillery Regiment
- 193rd Antitank Battalion
- 166th Antiaircraft Battery
- 306th Reconnaissance Company
- 372nd Sapper Battalion
- 583rd Signal Battalion
- 358th Medical/Sanitation Battalion
- 194th Chemical Defense (Anti-gas) Company
- 514th Motor Transport Company
- 356th Field Bakery
- 833rd Divisional Veterinary Hospital
- 1487th Field Postal Station
- 921st Field Office of the State Bank

Col. Andrei Pavlovich Karnov was assigned to command the division on the day it began forming. It was immediately assigned to the 2nd Red Banner Army which was headquartered at Blagoveshchensk. In November it was noted that 95 percent of the division's personnel were of Kazakh or Uzbek nationality. The 204th got to spend over nine months in the far east training and completing its complement of men and equipment, far longer than was usual for a rifle division during the crisis of 1941–42. On July 10, 1942, Colonel Karnov handed his command to Col. Aleksandr Vasilevich Skvortsov, just about the time that the division began moving west toward the fighting front. During the rest of the month and into August it was railed to the Stalingrad area where it joined the 64th Army in Stalingrad Front.

== Battle of Stalingrad ==
When the 204th began arriving at the front around July 20 the German 6th Army was advancing towards the Don River. 64th Army, under command of Lt. Gen. V. I. Chuikov, was located south of the Chir River with the 204th and 208th Rifle Divisions, 66th Naval Rifle Brigade and 137th Tank Brigade along or east of the Don. The German commander, Gen. F. Paulus, began planning for a coup-de-main to take Stalingrad by forcing crossings north and south of Kalach-na-Donu; in response the 204th was transferred to 62nd Army and concentrated at Kalach with one regiment on the west bank of the Don by July 28. At 1645 hours that day the STAVKA sent the following order to Stalingrad Front:

... the Front's main mission over the next few days is, at all cost, to defeat the enemy who have reached the western bank of the Don River south of Nizhne-Chirskaia by no later than 30 July by means of active operations by the forces of 64th Army and the employment of 204th and 321st Rifle Divisions and 23rd Tank Corps, which have reached the Kalach region, and restore fully the defenses here along the Stalingrad line, while subsequently driving the enemy back across the Tsimla River.

Anticipating this order the Front commander had already directed a counterattack by these forces and more, but it faltered with little to show for the effort.

As of August 1 the division had returned to 64th Army which was now under command of Lt. Gen. M. S. Shumilov. Stalingrad Front was facing a new crisis as the 4th Panzer Army, led by the XXXXVIII Panzer Corps, drove toward the city from the southwest. In response, late on August 2 the 64th Army was ordered east to protect the Aksai River line while the 204th, 229th and 112th Rifle Divisions and their defensive sectors on the Chir and Don rivers were transferred back to 62nd Army. As the situation on the Aksai deteriorated the 204th was ordered east and as of the early morning of August 4 was again part of 64th Army in the newly created Southeastern Front, although Col. Gen. A. I. Yeryomenko would not take active command until August 7. Meanwhile, Yeryomenko was planning a defense against 4th Panzer Army along the Myshkova River and the Abganerovo area. 64th Army was to cover a 120km-wide sector from the Don to Tinguta Station blocking the shortest German route to Stalingrad. By the end of August 8 Shumilov had scraped together a force to counterattack the vanguard of XXXXVIII Panzer Corps, consisting of the 204th, 38th and 157th Rifle Divisions, the 13th Tank Corps and several supporting units, with the KV-1 tanks of the 133rd Tank Brigade joining the next day. This attack struck the weakened 14th Panzer and 29th Motorized Divisions from three sides, with the 204th and 208th Divisions and the 13th Tanks advancing south along the railroad from Tinguta Station, taking the 29th Motorized by surprise and inflicting considerable casualties. This division was forced to withdraw its forward elements southward almost 10 km to new defenses north of Abganerovo Station by late on August 10. The 204th was reported as having reached from this point to 6 km southeast of 74 km Station State Farm #3 (8 km southeast of Tinguta Station) and as having helped liquidate a German penetration near 74 km Station by August 11. By now 4th Panzer Army was incapable of continuing its advance. On August 12 General Paulus announced that his Army had encircled and destroyed most of 62nd Army west of the Don, including the 204th, but this outdated claim was based on rearguards of the one rifle regiment that had been posted on the far bank.

=== Fighting on the Approaches ===
After rest and regrouping 4th Panzer Army resumed its attack at 0700 hours on August 20. Following a strong artillery preparation the 94th and 371st Infantry Divisions, supported by a battlegroup of 29th Motorized, advanced 4–5 km to the north, forcing the 204th and 126th Rifle Divisions to abandon their defenses at Abganerovo Station. As they fell back Shumilov reinforced them with the 29th Rifle Division and two brigades of 13th Tank Corps, allowing them to establish new defenses covering Yurkino Station. The German advance faltered late in the day due to heavy Soviet resistance. Over the following ten days the German/Romanian forces ground forward at the junction between 64th and 57th Armies and the 204th gradually fell back on the west flank of the penetration, reaching 55 km Station by August 24 where it was fighting in partial encirclement with the 29th Division and elements of 15th Guards Rifle Division. The next day it was withdrawn with the 38th Division to a line 7 km west of Tinguta Station. By now 4th Panzer Army was again running out of steam but found a weak spot covered by the damaged 126th Rifle Division and advanced nearly 20 km on August 29. In response to this changed strategic situation the 204th and 138th Rifle Divisions were withdrawn into the Army reserve on August 31.

The 6th and 4th Panzer Armies began a renewed drive into the suburbs of Stalingrad on September 3. In the south the XXXXVIII Panzer Corps, including the 94th Infantry and Romanian 20th Infantry Division, was to attack eastward from Voroponovo Station and northeastward from Elkhi with the objective of reaching the Volga and seizing the city south of the Tsaritsa River. The initial assault by 14th Panzer and 29th Motorized west of Peschanka was repelled by 64th Army's right flank 29th, 204th, 157th and 126th Rifle Divisions. 14th Panzer attacked again at dawn on September 4 but was stalled short of Peschanka by the resistance of the 204th and 126th Divisions. These right flank divisions maintained their defense the following day although they were being worn down by the ongoing attacks; General Shumilov assembled a reserve in the Beketovka area which included the 10th Rifle Brigade.

The XXXXVIII Panzer Corps regrouped its forces on September 7 with the intention of redirecting its attack southeastward against 64th Army's right flank. Its assault resumed the next day, badly damaging the 244th Rifle Division and pressing the 204th and 126th and the reinforcing 138th Division and 133rd Tank Brigade back to new defenses southwest from the western outskirts of Peschanka. On September 9 the German forces drove southward west of Kuporosnoe, forcing the 138th, 204th and 157th Divisions to abandon Staro-Dubovka. The Soviet forces withdrew to the new defense line east and west of Gornaia Poliana, which was already manned by the 126th Division. During the day the remainder of 14th Panzer reinforced the assault of the 29th Motorized and while this was halted short of Kuporosnoe and the west bank of the Volga, the four rifle divisions were being rapidly eroded away.

Overnight on September 9/10 a battalion of the 29th Motorized reached the Volga south of Kuporosnoe but was thrown back in part by the 131st Rifle Division after it had been relieved at Gornaia Poliana. On September 12 the fighting for the Stalingrad suburbs reached its climax. 14th Panzer was now supported by the mixed German/Romanian IV Army Corps and probed the defenses of the 64th Army from the southwest outskirts of Kuporosnoe around to its boundary with 57th Army at Ivanovka. This position would become known as the Beketovka bridgehead.

==== Beketovka Bridgehead ====
In the last days of September a task group of 57th Army carried out a successful counterstroke against the positions of 1st Romanian Infantry Division at Lake Tsatsa and the 14th Panzer had to be sent to stabilize the front. This was followed overnight on October 1/2 by an attack by five divisions, including the 204th, of the 64th Army against the positions of the 371st Infantry Division at and west of Peschanka in an attempt to capture that place and Staro-Dubovka. The division, from the Army's second echelon, attacked from behind the 138th Division and reached a line from Marker 135.4 to Marker 131.3 (7 km south of Peschanka). The commander of the 422nd Rifle Division, Col. I. K. Morozov, wrote:

Day and night, the divisions of 64th Army fought their way to the north to link up with 62nd Army, but the distance between the armies scarcely diminished.

Although the attack failed, it was an unpleasant distraction for General Paulus, whose 6th Army was now deeply involved in the fighting in the city.

=== Operation Uranus ===
As of November 19 the 204th was one of five rifle divisions in 64th Army, which also commanded five rifle brigades, two tank brigades, and several other formations. The Army was now back in Stalingrad Front, commanded by General Yeryomenko, who had helped plan the operation that would encircle and destroy the German 6th Army. Under this plan the 204th, 157th and 38th Rifle Divisions, supported by the 13th and 56th Tank Brigades and several supporting units would form a shock group with the objectives of penetrating the defenses of the German 197th Infantry Division and the Romanian 20th Division, reaching Yagodnyi and Nariman on the first day, then envelop and destroy these Axis forces in cooperation with 57th Army.

The Front's counteroffensive began on November 20 with a 75-minute artillery preparation at 1430 hours and 64th Army launched its ground assault at about 1535 hours. Supported by about 40 infantry support tanks the three rifle divisions attacked to the west in the 12 km-wide sector from the north bank of the Chervlenaia River to just east of Elkhi. This was in close cooperation with 57th Army's shock group, the 422nd and 169th Rifle Divisions, attacking south of the Chervlenaia. The three divisions of the 64th struck the defenses of the 297th Infantry Division's 523rd Regiment in and around Elkhi, and the Romanian 20th, which was spread from Elkhi as far south as Tundutovo Station. The 204th, on the shock group's right wing, faced determined resistance at and north of Elkhi and made only a minimal advance despite launching multiple assaults into the early evening. The offensive resumed shortly after dawn but soon encountered intense counterattacks, reportedly supported by as many as 70 tanks likely from the 29th Motorized, which halted all progress by the 204th and 157th Divisions and also forced a short withdrawal by the 38th after it took heavy losses.

Early on November 22 General Shumilov focused his Army's efforts on its left flank while replacing the 38th Division with the 36th Guards Rifle Division, reinforced with the 56th Tank Brigade, 1104th Artillery Regiment and a battalion of the 4th Guards Mortar Regiment. The 36th Guards, flanked on the right by the 204th and 157th, went over to the attack at 1300 hours and advanced roughly 5 km in heavy fighting while the 204th covered 4 km and captured the Romanian stronghold at Yagodnyi by 1730 with the 157th making similar gains in the center. Under heavy pressure the commander of the German IV Army Corps ordered the Romanian 20th and most of the 297th Division to fall back to a new defensive line anchored on the town of Tsybenko; this line ran eastward 10 km along the Karavatka Balka to Elkhi, which was still in the hands of the 297th. During November 23 the 64th Army shock group faced resistance from rearguards of the German 297th and 371st Infantry and the 82nd Regiment of the Romanian 20th Infantry but still advanced up to 8 km as the Axis forces fell back to their new line. The 204th and 29th Divisions made a further effort to take Elkhi but apart from seizing Hill 116.3 to its west this was unsuccessful. On the same day the Soviet forces completed the encirclement of German 6th Army. The next day the shock group, weakened by casualties during the offensive to date, ran up against the strong Tsybenko–Elkhi defensive line and faltered. The 204th and 157th were thrown back along the Balka by the Romanian 82nd and the German 523rd Regiments. 64th Army would remain facing these defenses into December.

=== Operation Ring ===
On December 2 the 29th Rifle Division, backed by about 40 tanks, struck the defenses of two battalions of the German 523rd Regiment on the 6 km-wide sector from Yagodnyi to Elkhi and, at the cost of perhaps 30 tanks destroyed, managed to capture part of the latter place. Further west at Tsybenko repeated assaults by the 204th and 157th Divisions and elements of 57th Army achieved little or nothing. The situation on this sector remained stalemated into January 1943. On December 7 Colonel Skvortsov was promoted to the rank of major general.

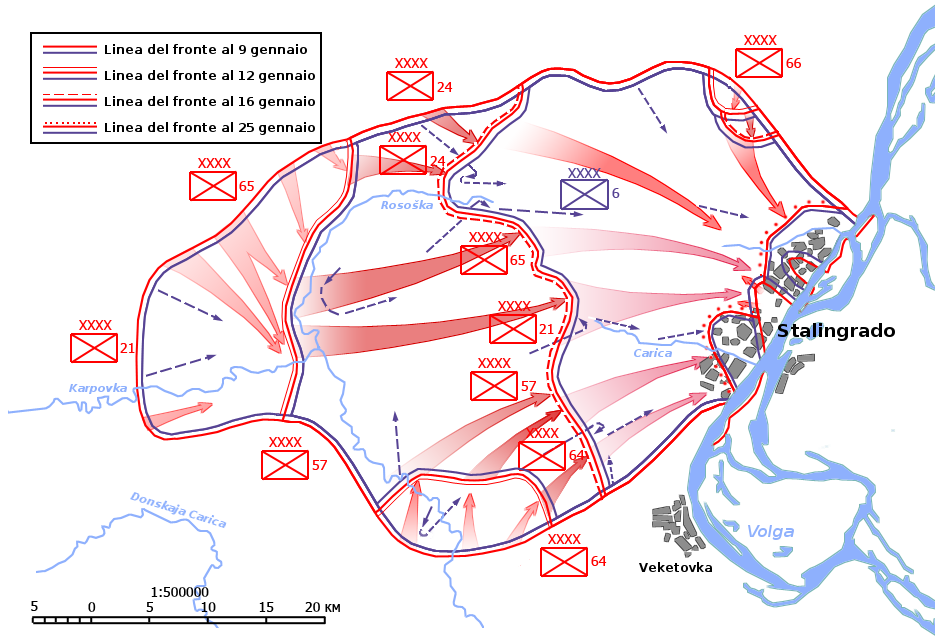
Operation Ring

By January the Soviet forces besieging the Stalingrad Kessel had been consolidated into Don Front, under command of Col. Gen. K. K. Rokossovski. In the planning for Operation Ring the 64th Army was directed to initially pin down the opposing German forces it opposed before exploiting to the north and northeast. Shumilov organized his main attack on the sector from south of Hill 111.6 east to Elkhi with a shock group that consisted of the 204th, the 157th and the 36th Guards, plus the 143rd Rifle Brigade. This force was supported by 51 tanks from the 90th Tank Brigade and 35th and 166th Tank Regiments. This group faced the center of the 297th Infantry Division, including the Romanian 82nd Regiment.

The offensive began on January 10. Attacking at 0900 hours the 204th and 36th Guards Divisions pushed north from the northern bank of the Balka toward the southeastern approaches to Hill 111.6, advancing up to 2 km on its right. By day's end the 64th and 57th Armies' shock groups had carved a penetration up to 3 km deep through the defenses of the 297th Infantry and forced it to use all its reserves in futile attempts to close the breach. In addition the German division had lost 18 of its 31 antitank guns. The shock groups continued to gain ground the following day and on January 12 did further damage to the defenses of IV Army Corps, with the 204th and 157th Divisions and 143rd Rifle Brigade enveloping Hill 119.7 from three sides. On the fourth day the 204th and the 143rd fought for possession of the ground from Hill 78.8 to Sect. No. 1 of Poliana State Farm, roughly 6 km northeast of Tsybenko; the gap in the IV Corps' defenses was now 15 km wide and up to 8 km deep. Early on January 14 Shumilov shuffled his forces in preparation for a wheel to northeast toward the ruined city. The 204th and 29th Divisions, with the 143rd Rifle and 154th Naval Rifle Brigades, were redeployed on a 7 km-wide sector from the Hill 78.8 area to northwest of Hill 119.7. In the process they engaged and defeated a counterattack force based on the 171st Bicycle Battalion, but between this and the ongoing German resistance on Hill 119.7 and at Elkhi gained relatively little ground.

Following a pause the final phase of Operation Ring began on January 26. By this time the division was near the southernmost sector of downtown Stalingrad, north of Kuporosnoe, facing the remnants of the 371st Infantry Division. On January 29 the 36th Guards, 29th and 204th Divisions and 7th Rifle Corps attacked from positions along Krasnoznamenskaia Street and advanced northward from 150m to 600m. The 204th and the 7th Corps reached Uritskaia Street near the corner of Oktiabrskaia Street where they captured several staff officers of 6th Army who informed them that Paulus' headquarters was in the nearby Univermag department store. During the evening soldiers of the 204th captured an officer who turned out to be the adjutant of Brig. Gen. S. R. Dimitriu, commander of the 20th Romanian Division, which was by now reduced to the composite 82nd Regiment, situated in a grain elevator in the Flour Milling Factory No. 2 on the north bank of the Tsaritsa. Skvortsov reported this to Shumilov who sent his deputy for political affairs to aid in negotiations. After 30 minutes of discussion and the threat of a Katyusha bombardment on his positions Dimitriu surrendered his remaining men at 2130 hours.

The 64th Army was assigned the lead role in the reduction of the German southern pocket on January 30. The 204th and the 7th Corps on its right wing attacked due north and reached to within 100m of the city's main ferry landing stage. Paulus' surrender took place the next day. The remaining fighting in the city largely took place in the factory district. Immediately following the final Axis surrender on February 2 the 64th Army was ordered to move north to the Livny region but this decision was revoked the next day and the Army was retained in Stalingrad, first under General N. I. Trufanov's operational group and as of February 27 in the Stalingrad Group of Forces. On March 1 the 204th Rifle Division was officially redesignated as the 78th Guards Rifle Division.

== 2nd Formation ==
A new 204th Rifle Division was formed in the last days of May 1943 in the 38th Army of Voronezh Front, based on the 37th Rifle Brigade.

=== 37th Rifle Brigade ===
This brigade was one of a series of "student" rifle brigades formed from military schools and reserve units starting in October 1941 in the Central Asia Military District. It was first assigned to the 16th Army in Western Front by the beginning of December but by the start of the new year had been shifted to 5th Army in the same Front. Later in January it was pulled out of the fighting line and moved north where it joined the 2nd Guards Rifle Corps in the reserves of Kalinin Front. Through the rest of the winter it took part in the battles in the Rzhev - Toropets area, and in late April was reassigned to the 1st Shock Army in Northwestern Front where it became involved in the complex and bloody struggles around the Demyansk Pocket. In September the 37th was withdrawn into the Reserve of the Supreme High Command and assigned to the forming 2nd Reserve Army. In late December it was moved south where it joined the reserves of Bryansk Front but in February 1943 it was reassigned to Voronezh Front. During this month it was caught up in the German counteroffensive at Kharkov and suffered considerable losses. After the German offensive ground to a halt the brigade was reassigned to the newly forming 69th Army and later to 38th Army which was digging in on the right flank of Voronezh Front deep within the Kursk salient.

Col. Ksaverii Mikhailovich Baydak, who had commanded the 37th Brigade, remained in command of the new division. Its order of battle remained the same as the first formation except under the new "shtat" it no longer had an antiaircraft battery. As of July 1 the 204th was one of six rifle divisions in 38th Army. The Army saw very limited action during Operation Zitadelle and as it was ending the division departed the salient to join 20th Army in the Reserve of the Supreme High Command. By the beginning of September it had been assigned to the separate 1st Rifle Corps in Kalinin Front, and later that month the Corps became part of 43rd Army in the same Front (renamed 1st Baltic Front in October). At this time the 1st Rifle Corps consisted of the 204th, 145th and 262nd Rifle Divisions.

== Battles for Vitebsk ==
The 204th arrived at its new fighting front in time to take part in the Smolensk-Roslavl Offensive Operation, which began on September 14. 43rd Army was attacking in the area of Demidov as part of the offensive that led to the liberation of Smolensk on September 25. On October 1 the 730th Rifle Regiment was involved in fighting near the village of Shatilovo in the Rudnyansky district. Starshina Ksenia Semyonovna Konstantinova was serving as a sanitary instructor and medic in one of the Regiment's battalions. Her position was surrounded and she fought off German soldiers with her personal weapon while protecting her wounded comrades. After suffering severe wounds she was captured, brutally maimed and tortured before being killed. On June 4, 1944, she would be posthumously made a Hero of the Soviet Union.

At this time 43rd Army was facing elements of the German VI Army Corps as the momentum of the Soviet summer offensive waned. Kalinin Front had been directed by the STAVKA to capture Vitebsk by October 10 but it soon became clear that this objective was well out of reach. The Army commander, Lt. Gen. K. D. Golubev, had his 1st and 91st Rifle Corps deployed abreast with orders to attack through the town of Kolyshki, at the boundary of the German 14th and 206th Infantry Divisions. On October 3 the 262nd Rifle Division and 105th Tank Regiment managed to penetrate the defenses north of Kolyshki, advanced to the town's northern outskirts the next day and soon liberated it. On October 8 the 204th, supported by 46th Mechanized Brigade, tore a small hole through the 206th Infantry's defenses west of Kolyshki after an advance by the Corps of roughly 8 km but was only able to gain another 1000m. The offensive to date had cost Kalinin Front considerable casualties and was halted around October 16.

=== Polotsk–Vitebsk Offensive ===
1st Baltic Front began its Polotsk–Vitebsk Offensive on November 2. The 43rd and 39th Armies were ordered to concentrate their forces north of the Smolensk - Vitebsk railroad and highway facing the 14th and 206th Divisions of VI Corps. They were to attack west toward Vitebsk on November 8 with the goal of linking up with 4th Shock Army advancing south from Gorodok. General Golubev deployed his 1st Corps on the left and 91st Corps on the right with the 92nd Rifle Corps in a flanking role and launched a heavy assault against the German defenses south of Yanovichi. The attack tore a gaping hole in these defenses, again at the junction of the two German divisions. A combined push by both Armies the next day enlarged the gap to a width of 10 km and by evening lead elements of the attacking force reached Poddube just 10 km east of the defense lines around Vitebsk proper. The 206th Infantry's defensive front was by now a shambles and the 14th's right flank was both turned and wide open. Despite this the 43rd Army's attacks were contained at Poddube on November 11 while the 39th Army gained another 5 km before being halted by counterattacks. The next day Colonel Baydak handed his command to Lt. Col. Ivan Vladimirovich Klepikov, but returned on November 21.

By November 17 the defenders had managed to restore a fairly continuous front west of Poddube, Karamidy and Argun and the Soviet assault expired in exhaustion. Late in the month the 1st Corps, now consisting of just the 204th and 145th Divisions, was transferred along with its sector to the 39th Army in preparation for a further effort in December. As of December 13 the 5th Guards Rifle Corps and 1st Rifle Corps of 39th Army, with the 43rd Army's 92nd Corps, were facing the three divisions of VI Corps on a 50 km-wide sector on both sides of the Smolensk - Vitebsk railway and highway. The renewed offensive began on December 19 when the combined forces of 39th and 43rd Armies struck the defenses of the German 14th Infantry. Both divisions of 1st Corps were in first echelon and were supported by the 39th Guards Tank and 47th Mechanized Brigades. Together the two Armies drove the German forces back up to 3 km on an 8 km-wide front by day's end. The next day the second echelon forces were committed but German reserves limited the advance in heavy combat that went on until December 23 when heavy losses again forced a halt. Before the end of the month the 1st Corps was transferred back to 43rd Army where it went on the defensive facing the 3rd and 4th Luftwaffe Field Divisions and roughly half of the 14th Infantry.

=== Operation Bagration ===
Over the rest of the winter and through the spring of 1944 the 204th remained in much the same positions. On March 23 Baydak again left his command, this time handing over to his deputy commander Col. Matvei Sergeevich Eroshkin, but returned on March 30. On May 22 the 43rd Army came under command of Lt. Gen. A. P. Beloborodov. In the preparation for the summer offensive the 204th and 145th Divisions were reassigned to 92nd Corps. Beloborodov gave the Army's main task of attacking from the north to the 1st and 60th Rifle Corps with considerable armor and artillery support. 92nd Corps was to defend the front from Chisti to Koitovo and be ready to launch an attack in the direction of the village of Staroe Selo; it was intended to pin the German LIII Army Corps in Vitebsk while the other two Corps encircled the salient in cooperation with 39th Army.

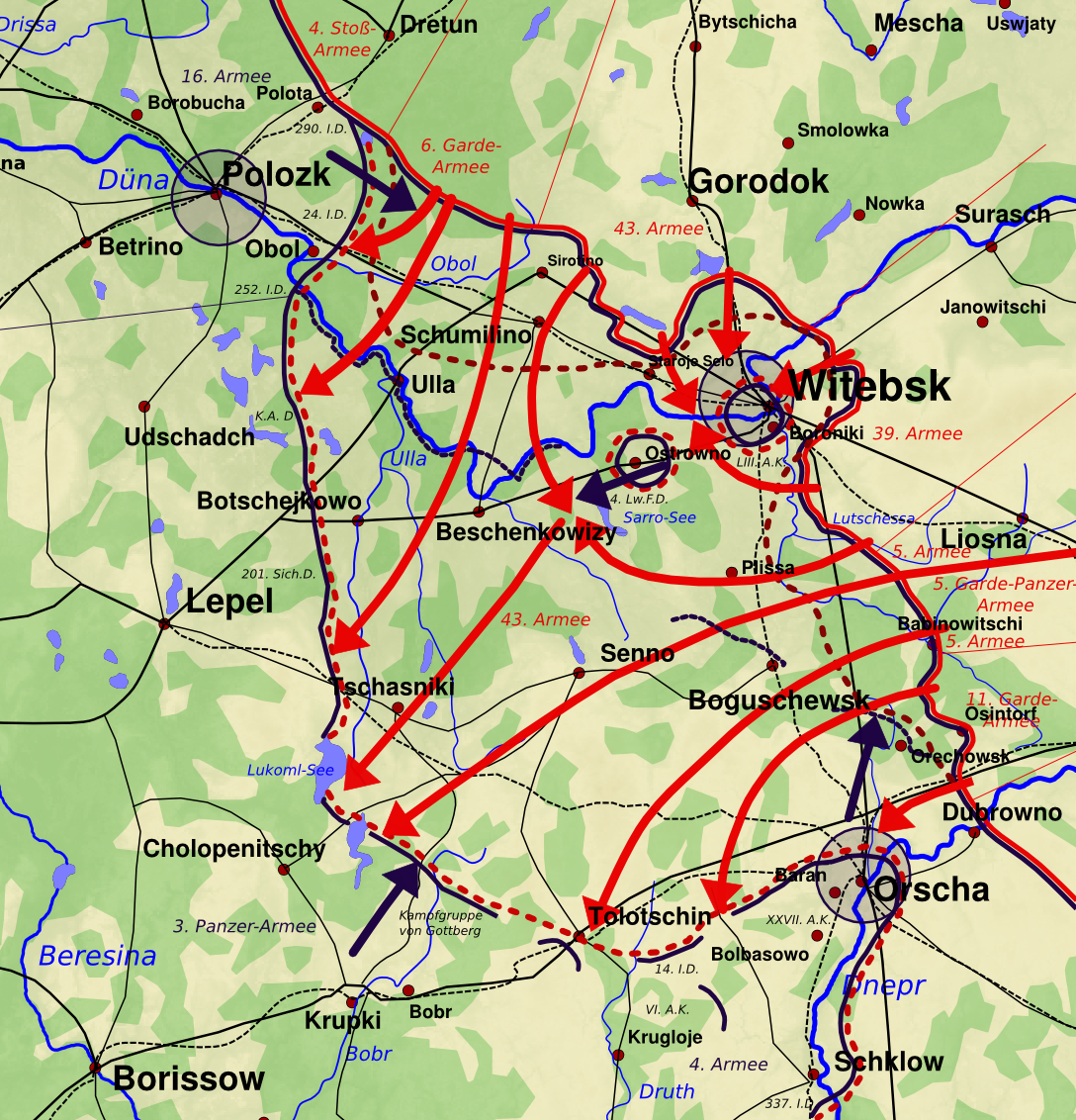
Vitebsk-Orsha Offensive.

1st Baltic Front's offensive began at 0400 hours on June 22 following a very heavy artillery preparation lasting 20 minutes. While the attacking Corps of 43rd Army badly damaged the German 252nd Infantry Division and Corps Detachment "D" the perimeter around Vitebsk was relatively quiet, limited to artillery strikes and minor attacks by 92nd Corps and the adjacent 84th Rifle Corps of 39th Army. The commander of Army Group Center requested permission to withdraw to shorten the line, but Hitler would not agree. On the second day the 1st and 60th Corps made even greater progress than on the first while 92nd Corps remained relatively quiet until early evening when Hitler authorized the city's garrison to pull back to the third defense zone and the Corps followed up, pressing south to reach the west bank of the Dvina River on June 24. Late that day Hitler authorized three of the four divisions of LIII Corps to hold open the road to the west but insisted that the 206th Infantry remain in Vitebsk. This made little difference as just before midnight the city was encircled and 35,000 German soldiers were trapped. Breakout attempts on June 25 saw only limited success and during the next day the 92nd, 60th and 84th Rifle Corps steadily reduced the pocket. In recognition of its achievements in this offensive, the 204th was awarded its honorific:

VITEBSK ... 204th Rifle Division (Col. Baydak, Ksaverii Mikhailovich) ... By order of the Supreme High Command of 26 June 1944, and a commendation in Moscow, the troops who participated in the liberation of Vitebsk are given a salute of 20 salvoes by 224 guns.

== Baltic Offensives ==
Following this victory the 43rd Army advanced into the "Baltic Gap" that had opened up between Army Groups Center and North and by the second week in July had reached the border of Lithuania, east of Švenčionys. At about this time the 204th rejoined the 1st Rifle Corps. During the next weeks the division worked its way to the northwest, eventually arriving in the area of Kupiškis and eventually reaching Linkuva by the time the German forces launched Operation Doppelkopf on August 16.

In the course of this fighting Sen. Sgt. Khasan Nazirovich Gaisin, the commander of a heavy machine gun crew of the 700th Rifle Regiment, distinguished himself and became a Hero of the Soviet Union. A native of what is now Bashkortostan, Gaisin had already been decorated for several actions dating back as far as February 1943, including the battle for Vitebsk in June. On August 6 elements of the 357th Rifle Division had been encircled by German counterattacks in the vicinity of Skapiškis. Gaisin then personally led an assault group loaded on amphibious tanks in a crossing of a nearby lake to break through to the pocket. After the landing his team captured two 75mm guns which they turned against German targets, while Gaisin himself killed or wounded eight enemy soldiers with machine gun fire. Sergeant Gaisin was officially awarded his Gold Star on March 24, 1945. He survived the war, went back to work on his native collective farm and later a state farm, and died in 1991 at the age of 83.

At about this time the 204th was transferred to the 1st Guards Rifle Corps of 51st Army, still in 1st Baltic Front; it would remain in this Army for the duration of the war. By the second week of September it had reached the border of Latvia near Eleja, and on September 13 Colonel Baydak was promoted to the rank of major general. Later in the month the 204th was transferred to 60th Corps but in October it returned to 1st Guards Corps where it would remain for the duration. In common with many rifle divisions on this secondary front by late January 1945 the division was operating on a much reduced establishment as other fronts had higher priority for replacements. At this time it reported having 554 officers, 898 NCOs and 1,981 privates for a total of 3,433 personnel. They were equipped with 1,976 rifles and carbines, 969 sub-machine guns, 80 light machine guns, 53 heavy machine guns, 43 82mm and 13 120mm mortars, 32 76mm cannon, 10 122mm howitzers, 7 76mm regimental guns, 22 45mm antitank guns, 42 antitank rifles, 104 trucks and cars, and 993 horses. In February the 51st Army went into 2nd Baltic Front and when that Front was disbanded it joined the Kurland Group of Forces in Leningrad Front, still containing the German forces trapped in the Courland pocket until the end of the war.

== Postwar ==
The division ended the war with the full title of 204th Rifle, Vitebsk Division. (Russian: 204-я стрелковая Витебская дивизия.) It remained in the Baltic states until August when it was withdrawn to the Moscow Military District. General Baydak remained in command until January 1946 when he was replaced by his deputy, Col. Dmitri Romanovich Nabatov. The division was disbanded the following month.
