= Luftwaffe Field Divisions =

Ground forces of the Luftwaffe

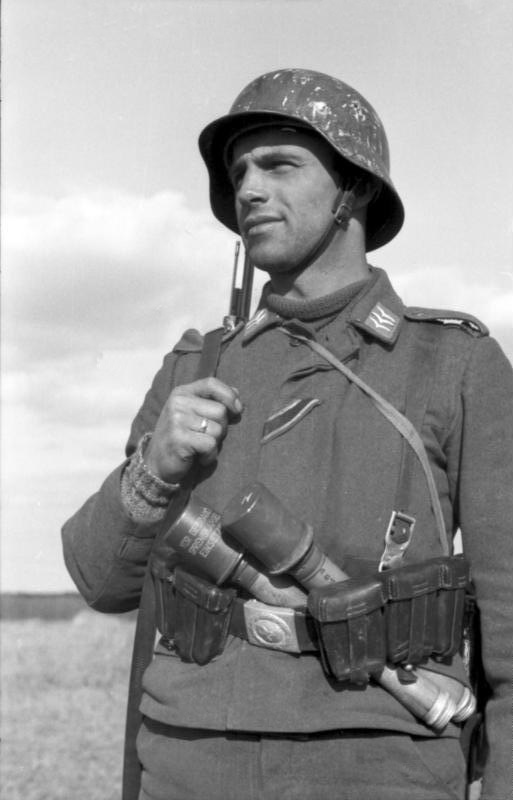
An Obergefreiter of a Luftwaffe field division in Russia.

The Luftwaffe field divisions (German: Luftwaffen-Feld-Divisionen) were the ground forces of the German Luftwaffe during World War II.

== History ==
The divisions were originally authorized in October 1942, following suggestions that the German Army (Heer) could be bolstered by transferring personnel from other services. The head of the Luftwaffe, Hermann Göring, formulated an alternative plan to raise his own infantry formations under the command of Luftwaffe officers; this was at least partly due to political differences with the Army. Göring took great pride in the degree of political commitment and indoctrination of Luftwaffe personnel; he described paratroopers of the Luftwaffe as "political soldiers". The Army was considered by Nazi standards too "conservative" – linked to conservative or monarchical traditions and ideals harking back to the Imperial days of the Kaiser.

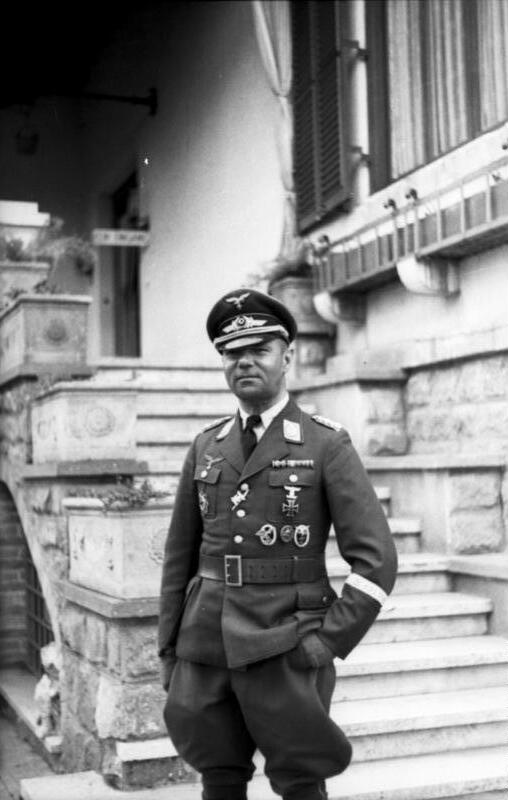
Alfred Schlemm, commander of 2nd Field Corps in Italy 1943

The plan was approved, and the divisions were raised from 200,000–250,000 Luftwaffe ground, support, and other excess personnel. They were initially organized with two Jäger (light infantry) regiments of three battalions each, along with an artillery battalion and other support units, but were substantially smaller than equivalent Army divisions, and by Göring's personal order were intended to be restricted to defensive duties in quieter sectors.

Most of the units spent much of their existence on the Eastern Front. Luftwaffe Field Divisions were present at actions such as the "Little Stalingrad of the North", the attempt to relieve Velikiye Luki in November 1942–January 1943; Battle of Nevel, they were at the Oranienbaum Bridgehead at Leningrad, & the withdrawal to the Kuban Bridgehead. They were part of Erich von Manstein's Army Group Don as it attempted to defend against Operation Little Saturn & the attempted defence of Vitebsk during Operation Bagration in June 1944, and the fighting in the Courland Pocket from July 1944 to May 1945, though they also fought in other theatres.

The Luftwaffe Field Divisions initially remained under Luftwaffe command, but late in 1943 those that had not already been disbanded were handed over to the Army and were reorganized as standard infantry divisions with three two-battalion rifle regiments. They retained their numbering, but with Luftwaffe attached to distinguish them from similarly numbered divisions already existing in the Army and had Army officers.

Until taken over by the Army, and in many cases for some time afterwards, these units were issued with standard Luftwaffe feldblau ("field blue") uniforms, and being so easily identifiable were said to often be singled out by opposing forces. Their reputation as combat troops was poor, despite the high standard of Luftwaffe recruits, at least in part because they were required to perform roles for which they as airmen usually had little training. An exception to the poor combat performance of Luftwaffe ground troops were Fallschirmjäger (paratrooper) units, whose performance was generally good, due to higher motivation, better training and higher entrance standards when compared to the Luftwaffe Field Divisions. Early Fallschirmjäger troops were also transferred directly from the Army to the Luftwaffe. Luftwaffe Field Division airmen were frequently used for rear-echelon duties to free up front-line troops.

== List of Luftwaffe Field Divisions ==
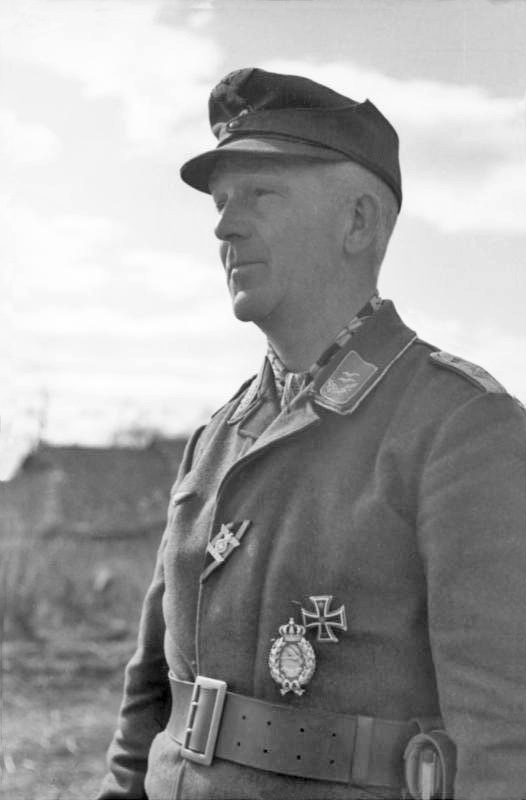
An Oberleutnant of a Luftwaffe Field Division in Russia, March 1942

List of Luftwaffe Field Divisions
Name	Notes
1st Luftwaffe Field Division	The 1st LDF was created in October 1942 & was assigned in December 1942 to Georg von Küchlers Army Group North & 18th Army It served in XXXVIII near Novgorod. Transferred to the German Army in December 1943. Suffered heavy losses in its first major combat operation, the defense against the Soviet Leningrad–Novgorod offensive of January–March 1944. Disbanded soon afterwards, with its personnel absorbed by the Army's 28th Jäger Division.
2nd Luftwaffe Field Division	Like all the Luftwaffe Field Divisions, the 2nd was in fact the size of a brigade, with only four infantry battalions, and especially weak in artillery. As part of Army Group Centre it suffered heavy losses in its first action south of Belyi in the Soviet Union during Operation Mars in November–December 1942. It fought with 3rd Panzerarmee under II Luftwaffe Field Corps At the Battle of Nevel & other offensives in the Autumn/Winter of 1943, in the Vicinity of Vitebsk. The repeat Soviet assaults meant the Division was disbanded & its remnants were distributed to the 4th & 6th Luftwaffe Field Divisions.
3rd Luftwaffe Field Division	It fought with in Central sector of the Eastern Front with Army Group Centres 3rd Panzerarmee under II Luftwaffe Field Corps at the Battle of Nevel & other offensives in the Autumn/Winter of 1943, in the Vicinity of Vitebsk. It suffered heavy losses in combat around Vitebsk between November 1943 and January 1944 and was disbanded soon afterward. its remnants were distributed to the 4th & 6th Luftwaffe Field Divisions which absorbed its personnel.
4th Luftwaffe Field Division	Placed in the Central Sector of the Eastern Front with Army Group Centre, It fought as part of 3rd Panzerarmee under II Luftwaffe Field Corps At the Battle of Nevel & other offensives in the Autumn/Winter of 1943, in the Vicinity of Vitebsk until June 1944. It was transferred to the German Army in November 1943. It was Destroyed defending Vitebsk during the Soviet Vitebsk–Orsha offensive in June 1944 as part of LIII Army Corps under Friedrich Gollwitzer.
5th Luftwaffe Field Division	It served on the Southern Sector of the Eastern Front under Army Group A from late 1942 to mid-1944. Where it served in the Caucasus. It soon withdrew in the face of the Soviet advance and was engaged in the fighting around the Kuban bridgehead from February to April 1943 as part of the 17th Army. It was evacuated to the Crimea the following month. In September 1943, the division was shifted north to Melitopol, on the Panther–Wotan line, where it fought in the Battle of the Dnieper. It also fought in the Odessa Offensive until May 1944.
6th Luftwaffe Field Division	It served on the Central Sector of the Eastern Front under Army Group Centre, It fought with 3rd Panzerarmee & II Luftwaffe Field Corps from late 1942 to June 1944 and took part in the Battle for Velikiye Luki & the Battle of Nevel (1943) & other Soviet Offensives in the Autumn/Winter of 1943 in the vicinity of Vitebsk, and in May 1943 an Anti partisan operation in Belarus, Operation Maigewitter and was Destroyed defending Vitebsk during the Soviet summer Vitebsk–Orsha offensive (Operation Bagration) in June 1944.
7th Luftwaffe Field Division	It served on the Southern Sector of the Eastern Front under Army Group Don for its short life and was assigned to the XLVIII Panzer Corps. Fought in the Chir (river) Battles, December 1942. It was destroyed during the Soviet Offensive Operation Little Saturn. This division was disbanded after Mar 43 with survivors folded into 15th Luftwaffe Field Division.
8th Luftwaffe Field Division	It served on the Southern Sector of the Eastern Front along the Chir (river) & Don (river) sectors under Army Group Don from late 1942 to April/May 1943 as part of Armee-Abteilung Hollidt. It was destroyed during the Soviet Offensive Operation Little Saturn. When it was disbanded and the remnant parts were absorbed by 15th Luftwaffe Field Division.
9th Luftwaffe Field Division	It served on the Northern sector of the Eastern Front. It was assigned to Georg Lindemanns 18th Army (Wehrmacht) and part of Army Group North on the Eastern Front. Posted to a sector at the Oranienbaum Bridgehead near Leningrad. It was destroyed during the Krasnoye Selo–Ropsha offensive. Remnants of the Division were distributed to the 61st Infantry Division, the 225th Infantry Division & the 227th Infantry Division
10th Luftwaffe Field Division	It served on the Northern sector of the Eastern Front. It was assigned to Georg Lindemanns 18th Army (Wehrmacht) and part of Army Group North on the Eastern Front. Posted to a sector at the Oranienbaum Bridgehead near Leningrad. It was destroyed during the Krasnoye Selo–Ropsha offensive. The Division was disbanded on 3 February 1944 and the remains of the division were incorporated into the 170th Infantry Division.
11th Luftwaffe Field Division	It served in Greece as part of Army Group E during 1943 & 1944 and took part in Dodecanese campaign and the Battle of Leros. During its withdrawal through the Balkans in 1945 it took part in a number actions including Operation Spring Awakening on the Eastern Front. It surrendered to British forces on 8 May 1945 at Klagenfurt.
12th Luftwaffe Field Division	Serving in Army Group Norths 18th Army, XXVIII Army Corps in early 1943. It was sent to a Volkhov river sector, just South of the 61st Infantry Division and saw action near the Kirischi bridgehead & was partly responsible for stopping Soviet drives in the area. Siege of Leningrad. In January 1944 it was listed as one of the stronger divisions in Army Group North, according to documents. It was scheduled as a 'Category III' formation that is capable of Full Defense. It made a fighting withdrawal to defend Luga and took heavy losses, listed as having 7424 men out of whom only 1481 were the actual bayonet strength. In May 1944 Army Group North stated in their daily war diary that only seven out of its thirty-two divisions were at 'full combat readiness'. Felddivision 12 (L) was considered 'one of the best divisions in the army group'. By September 1944 the German Divisions of Army Group North had been pushed back to Courland in Latvia Courland Pocket but still held the capital Riga. By 10 October the German divisions in the Riga bridgehead had repulsed thirteen major assaults Riga Offensive.After taking part in four of the battles for the Courland pocket the division was withdrawn by ship to Danzig on 8 March 1945. took part in the defence against the Soviets East Pomeranian Offensive until the end of March 1945, when it had been almost completely wiped out. Felddivision 12 (L) is considered as one of the two best Luftwaffe Field Divisions.
13th Luftwaffe Field Division	In early 1943, the division was transferred to Army Group North on the Eastern Front and assigned to the 18th Army. The division took over a position section on the Volkhov River in the area of Chudovo. It took part in the Third Battle of Lake Ladoga. Whilst not at the centre of the fighting, and South of the Kirishi Bridgehead and Pogoste Pocket. The Division held its positions on the river line throughout 1943. In January 1944, the division was struck by the major Soviet Leningrad–Novgorod offensive. In heavy rearguard action, it had to retreat to the Luga sector and from here further to the Pskow area. At the end of March 1944 the division fought on the Opochka - Pskow railway line, and suffered so many casualties that it was dissolved on 1 April 1944. What remained of the Division was incorporated into the Felddivision 12 (L).
14th Luftwaffe Field Division	formed in late 1942 from the 61st Air Regiment. Sent to Norway in 1943 to release army unit. Served in the occupation of Norway and the occupation of Denmark, seeing no combat.
15th Luftwaffe Field Division	
16th Luftwaffe Field Division	Eventually transferred to the Army as the 16th Luftwaffe Infantry Division (later 16th Volksgrenadier Division)
17th Luftwaffe Field Division	
18th Luftwaffe Field Division	Deployed in France
19. Luftwaffen-Sturm-Division	Remnants used to form 19th Grenadier Division, later 19 Volksgrenadier
20th Luftwaffe Field Division	later 20th Luftwaffe Sturm Division
21st Luftwaffe Field Division	previously the Meindl Division, an ad hoc collection of Luftwaffe resources
22nd Luftwaffe Field Division	Never formed; its sub-units were assigned to other divisions.

== Luftwaffe Field Corps ==
- I Luftwaffe Field Corps, planned during the winter of 1942–1943 on the basis of the 13th Air Corps (German: XIII. Fliegerkorps), but never really established.
- II Luftwaffe Field Corps, October 1942–1 November 1943: 2nd, 3rd, 4th, and 6th Luftwaffe Field Divisions (Alfred Schlemm)
- III Luftwaffe Field Corps, January 1943–November 1943: 9th and 10th Luftwaffe Field Divisions (Job Odebrecht)
- IV Luftwaffe Field Corps, January 1943–19 November 1944: 189th and 198th Infantry Divisions (Army) and 716th Static Infantry Division (Army) (Erich Petersen)

== See also ==
- 1st Fallschirm-Panzer Division Hermann Göring
- Fallschirm-Panzergrenadier Division 2 Hermann Göring
- List of German divisions in World War II
- Motor Rifle Regiment of the Aerospace Forces, similar unit during the Russian invasion of Ukraine
