= 6th Luftwaffe Field Division =

- Active: 1942–1944
- Country: Nazi Germany
- Branch: Luftwaffe
- Type: Infantry
- Size: Division
- Engagements: World War II; Eastern Front; Battle of Velikiye Luki; Battle of Nevel; Operation Maigewitter; Operation Bagration

The 6th Luftwaffe Field Division (German: 6.Luftwaffen-Feld-Division) was an infantry division of the Luftwaffe branch of the Wehrmacht that fought in World War II. It was formed using surplus ground crew of the Luftwaffe at Training Ground Camp Gross-Born from Luftwaffen-Flieger Regiment 21. Its initial training had been at Magdeburg. Like other Luftwaffe Field Divisions initially when first formed the unit's infantry complement contained no regimental headquarters, but did have four independently led Jager battalions. Its Artillery Battalion contained two batteries of 10.5 cm leFH 18M Towed Guns (by the Raupenschlepper Ost, Opel Blitz or Sd.Kfz. 8 vehicles) and a battery of 75mm L24 Short Barreled Sturmgeschütz III Assault Guns. The Panzer-Jager Battalion contained two batteries of 5 cm Pak 38 Anti Tank Guns and one battery of 7.5 cm Pak 40 Anti Tank Guns. The Flak Battalion contained three companies of three Batteries of four, armed with the single barreled Flak 38 2 cm Flak 30, Flak 38 and Flakvierling 38, three batteries of four of the Flak 37 3.7 cm Flak 18/36/37 and four Flak 36 guns 8.8 cm Flak 18/36/37/41. It served under Army Group Centre on the Central Sector of the Eastern Front from late 1942 to June 1944. Where it took part in the Battle of Velikiye Luki, Operation Maigewitter & the Battle of Nevel, it was destroyed during Operation Bagration.

== Operational history ==
The 6th Luftwaffe Field Division, one of several such divisions of the Luftwaffe (German Air Force), was formed in September 1942 in Gross-Born Troop Maneuver Area, under the command of Oberst Ernst Weber. (Note: The rank of oberst is equivalent to that of colonel in the United States Army.) Intended to serve as infantry, its personnel were largely drawn from surplus Luftwaffe ground crew. In November 1942, it was assigned to the II Luftwaffe Field Corps under the command of Alfred Schlemm it was part of Georg-Hans Reinhardt's 3rd Panzer Army, along with the 2nd, 3rd and 4th Luftwaffe Divisions in Army Group Centre on the Eastern Front and posted to a sector near Nevel. The division had the task of securing the connection between Army Groups North and Center & defended this sector against Soviet operations. It fought in the Battle of Nevel (1943) and other Battles in the Autumn/Winter of 1943 around Vitebsk in Byelorussia.

In November 1943, responsibility for the division was transferred to the Army and it was renamed the 6th Field Division (L). Shortly afterwards, its Field Jager battalions became the 52nd, 53rd and 54th Jager regiments while its original artillery, tank destroyer and flak battalions was integrated into a new 6th Artillery Regiment. Absorbing the remnants of Felddivision 2 (L) & Felddivision 3 (L) in the process. (Note: This artillery regiment later became the 34th Motorised Flak Regiment.) In the summer of 1944, the 6th Field Division held an area to the east of Vitebsk as part of LIII Corps of the 3rd Panzer Army. The division was encircled during the Vitebsk–Orsha Offensive at Vitebsk within days of the start of the Soviet Army's Operation Bagration on 22 June 1944 along with the rest of LIII Army Corps (Wehrmacht). The divisional commander, Generalleutnant Rudolf Peschel, (Note: The rank of generalleutnant is equivalent to that of major general in the United States Army.) was killed in action on 27 June 1944.

== Commanders ==
- Oberst Ernst Weber (September–November 1942); (Note: Ranks stated are those at the time of taking command.)
- Generalmajor Rüdiger von Heyking (November 1942–November 1943); (Note: The rank of generalmajor is equivalent to that of brigadier general in the United States Army.)
- Generalleutnant Rudolf Peschel (November 1943–27 June 1944) †.

== Notes ==
Footnotes

Citations
