= 2nd Luftwaffe Field Division =

German military unit

2nd Luftwaffe Field Division (2. Luftwaffen-Feld-Division)
- Active: 1942–1943
- Country: Nazi Germany
- Branch: Luftwaffe
- Type: Infantry
- Size: Division
- Engagements: World War II; Eastern Front; Operation Mars; Battle of Nevel (1943)

The 2nd Luftwaffe Field Division (German: 2. Luftwaffen-Feld-Division) was an infantry division of the Luftwaffe branch of the Wehrmacht that fought in World War II. It was formed using surplus Luftwaffe ground crew in September 1942 at Troop Training Ground Gross-Born under Luftgau III. The unit's infantry complement contained no regimental headquarters, but did have four independently led Jager battalions. The Division's Artillery Battalion contained three batteries equipped with Czechoslovak Škoda 75 mm Model 15 Mountain Guns. The Panzer-Jager Battalion contained 3 companies, one was a battery of Sturmgeschutz III 75mm L24 Assault Guns, one of 7.5 cm Pak 40 towed (by the Raupenschlepper Ost or Opel Blitz vehicles) anti-tank guns. And a Flak Company, that contained half track mounted Flak 37 3.7 cm Flak 18/36/37 guns. In November 1942 the worsening situation on the Eastern Front forced the quick transfer of the partly trained division to the area of Army Group Centre, where it was employed in defensive positions around the city of Smolensk. It served from late 1942 to October 1943, when it was destroyed and later disbanded.

== Operational history ==
The 2nd Luftwaffe Field Division was one of several Luftwaffe divisions formed in 1942 from surplus ground crew and intended to serve as conventional infantry divisions. The 2nd was raised at Groß Born in September 1942, under the command of Colonel Hellmuth Petzold.

The division was sent in November 1942 to the central sector of Army Group Centre on the Eastern Front, where it helped repel Soviet attacks in the area around Smolensk.

After the establishment of the II Luftwaffe Field Corps under the command of Alfred Schlemm, the division became subordinated to this Corps and was relocated to the Nevel area. It fought in the Battle of Nevel (1943) and other Battles in the Autumn/Winter of 1943 around Vitebsk in Byelorussia under Georg-Hans Reinhardts 3rd Panzer Army, along with the 3rd, 4th and 6th Luftwaffe Field Divisions. The division had the task of securing the connection between Army Groups North and Center. On 6 October 1943, the division was struck by an intense Soviet offensive aimed at the connection between Army Group North and Center. On the first day of the battle, the division's positions were overrun and a gap with a width of 12 km was created in the frontline. The connection to the neighboring 83rd Infantry Division was lost and the division retreated in panic. Its losses were extraordinarily high, especially in material. (Note: Losses had included large numbers of weapons: 2,648 rifles, 1,175 pistols, 552 machine guns, 31 mortars, 26 anti-tank guns, 38 20mm flak guns and 4 88mm flak guns. It was not possible to explain the high losses in weapons compared to the number of men lost (722 men) other than to think that many soldiers simply dropped their weapons and ran away or surrendered.) (Note: Privately some Army Divisional & Corps commanders called the Divisions soldiers "Gutless" and Reichschmarschall Hermann Göring was reportedly furious & this was a psychological blow to his ego. And was reported by his enemies to the furher) The division was therefore dissolved on 17 January 1944, with its remnants being absorbed by the 6th Luftwaffe Field Division (now Felddivision 6 (L)). (Note: Some parts of the Division were absorbed by Feldddivsion 3 (L) and Felddivision 4 (L).)

== Commanders ==
- Oberst Hellmuth Petzold (September 1942 – 1 January 1943)
- Oberst Carl Becker (1 January 1943 – 17 January 1943)
- Oberst Hellmuth Petzold (18 January 1943 – September 1943)
- General der Flieger Alfred Schlemm (September 1943 – December 1943)
