= Battle of Nevel (1943) =

Military action on the Eastern Front in World War II

Coordinates: 56°02′N 29°55′E

- Part of the Eastern Front of World War II
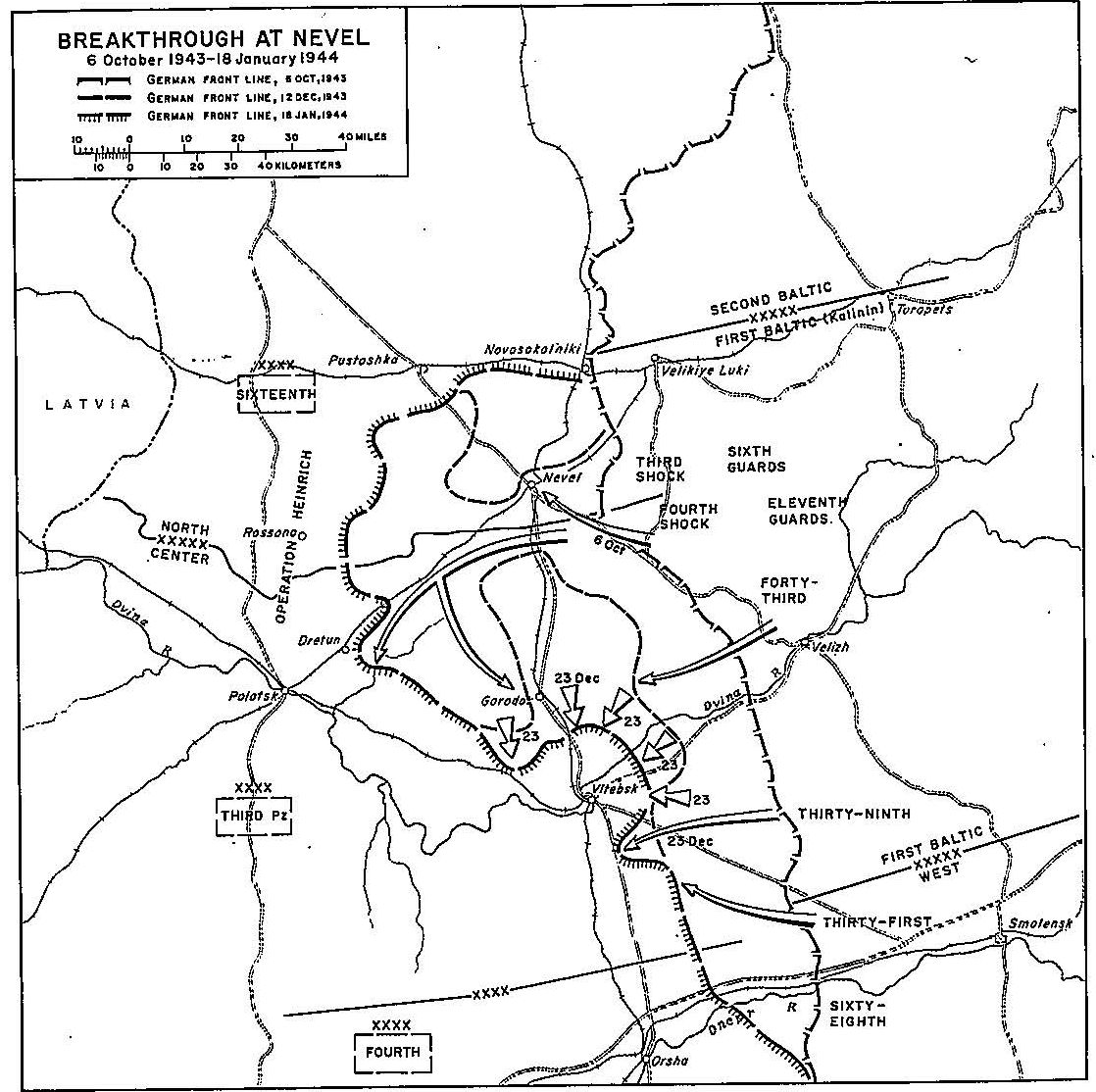
- The Nevel Salient, October 6 1943 to January 18 1944
Date	October 6 – December 16 1943
Location	Northwestern Russia/Northeastern Belarus
Result	Soviet victory

Belligerents
Germany	Soviet Union

Commanders and leaders
(Nazi Germany) Ernst Busch (Nazi Germany) Christian Hansen (Nazi Germany) Georg-Hans Reinhardt	(Soviet Union) Andrey Yeryomenko (Soviet Union) Kuzma Galitsky (Soviet Union) Vasily Shvetsov

Strength
Unknown	198,000

Casualties and losses
7,000 killed and wounded 400 prisoners Total: 7,400 (16th Army, Oct. 6–10 only)	43,551 killed or missing 125,351 wounded Total: 168,902 (to Dec. 31)

The Battle of Nevel was a successful military operation conducted by the Red Army in the Pskov Oblast of western Russia and in northern Belarus during World War II, from October 6 to roughly December 16, 1943, although fighting persisted in the area into the new year.

The initial attack created an unexpected breakthrough of the German defenses and liberated the town of Nevel on the first day and subsequent attacks over the next four days created a salient about 35km wide and 25 km deep at the junction between German Army Groups North and Center. Through the following weeks the forces of 1st Baltic Front continued to expand the salient and attempt to outflank and encircle the units of German 16th Army and 3rd Panzer Army to its north and south while those same units, at Hitler's orders, "held the goalposts" and attempted to cut off the salient itself. Hitler finally conceded these efforts were futile on December 16 as 1st Baltic continued attacking southwards toward Vitebsk.

== Background ==
Following the Battle for Velikiye Luki in the winter of 1942–43 the 3rd Shock Army had remained on much the same lines east of Novosokolniki and Nevel through the spring and summer. During this time the railway from Vitebsk through Nevel to Pskov remained in German hands linking the two army groups, although it was under Soviet artillery fire near Novosokolniki. Breaking this line was an obvious objective. Although Army Group North had created a ready reserve of five infantry divisions to deal with threats on either end of its front, in early September the Army High Command ordered two of them transferred to Army Group South. On September 19 Army Group North took over XXXXIII Army Corps from Army Group Center, giving it an additional three divisions, 77km of front, and the responsibility of defending Nevel and Novosokolniki.

=== Objective ===
The Soviet position had the potential to serve as the springboard for a "big solution": an offensive to drive between the German army groups all the way to the Gulf of Riga. Given the nature of the terrain, with many forests, lakes and swamps and few roads even by Russian standards, plus the manpower demands from other sectors, this was impractical. Instead, General Yeryomenko planned the attack on Nevel as a supporting operation for his Front's wider offensive towards Vitebsk:

While planning the Nevel operation, we anticipated supporting the general front operation along the Vitebsk axis and also creating conditions conducive for developing success southward toward Gorodok and also northward and northwestward to seize the Novosokolniki center of resistance... Furthermore, the attack on Nevel diverted considerable German forces, and its success would disrupt the entire enemy communications system... This would prevent the enemy from maneuvering from the north to support his Vitebsk grouping.

== Battle ==
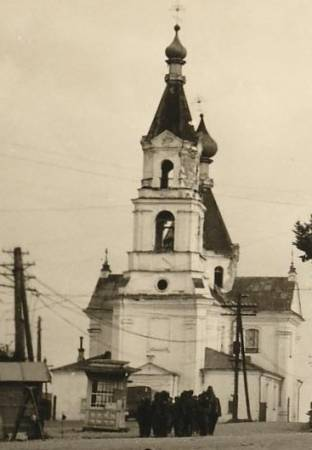
Nevelsk Church during German occupation, 1942

The offensive began at 0500 hours on October 6 with a reconnaissance-in-force, followed by a 90-minute artillery preparation at 0840 hours and airstrikes by 21st Assault Aviation Regiment. 3rd Shock went over to the attack at 1000 hours on the Zhigary-Shliapy sector, precisely at the boundary between the two German army groups. 28th Rifle Division spearheaded the assault in the first echelon followed closely by an exploitation echelon consisting of the 21st Guards Rifle Division and the 78th Tank Brigade with 54 tanks. The assaulting force struck and demolished the 2nd Luftwaffe Field Division. Like all the Luftwaffe "divisions" the 2nd was in fact the size of a brigade, with only four infantry battalions, and was especially weak in artillery with just eight 75mm mountain guns and a battery of Stug IIIs. It had been badly damaged in its first action south of Belyi during Operation Mars nearly a year earlier.

In addition to the flight of 2nd Luftwaffe Field Division the right flank of 263rd Infantry Division was badly smashed. While the attack of the 357th Rifle Division was contained the 78th Tank Brigade, carrying troops of 21st Guards Rifle Division with more mounted on trucks, along with the 163rd Antitank and 827th Howitzer Artillery Regiments, entered the gap and rapidly drove to the west and liberated Nevel from the march. General Galitskiy reported, "In the city of Nevel, the enemy garrison was destroyed, and many warehouses, vehicles, and other equipment were seized. There are prisoners. The quantity of trophies is being calculated." At the same time the 4th Shock Army, deployed on 3rd Shock's left (south) flank, also launched an attack towards Gorodok. General Shvetsov had formed a shock group from two of his rifle corps, each advancing abreast in three echelons. 2nd Guards Rifle Corps led with its 360th Rifle Division, followed by 117th and 16th Lithuanian Divisions and two tank brigades. 83rd Rifle Corps had its 47th Rifle Division up, supported by 234th, 235th and 381st Rifle Divisions and another two tank brigades. Although there were no further panicked withdrawals by II Luftwaffe Corps the attack gained about 20km but ultimately faltered just short of the Nevel-Gorodok-Vitebsk railroad and highway.

Earl Ziemke wrote that the sudden collapse of 2nd Luftwaffe Division came as much a surprise to the Soviets as to the Germans:

But in warfare combatants can occasionally have more good luck than convenient to handle, and apparently something of that sort befell Kalinin Front in the attack on Nevel... for a Soviet front command, even in late 1943, it raised many distressing uncertainties. On October 9, Yeremenko suddenly reined in on the offensive. During the several days' pause that followed, Army Groups North and Center threw a line around the western limits of the breakthrough, and each moved in a corps headquarters to command the battle area.

By Soviet reckoning the Nevel Offensive Operation ended on October 10, but the fighting in and around the salient continued at least into mid-December with the German forces attempting to cut off the salient as a whole while the Soviet forces expanded their hold to the north, south and west.

=== German reaction ===
The Germans' first impression was that they had fumbled badly but not irrevocably. Field Marshal G. von Küchler, commander of Army Group North, ordered his three remaining reserve divisions into the breakthrough area while Hitler ordered the "corner posts" (the positions on either side of the breakthrough gap) to be held at all costs. The initial efforts to counterattack failed due to transportation difficulties and superior Soviet strength and on October 9 Küchler decided to wait for reinforcements before trying again. Meanwhile Hitler berated his subordinates for failing to hold at unit boundaries, demanding that they should "consider it a point of honor" to maintain contact. When Army Group Center proposed merging the remnants of 2nd Luftwaffe Division with an Army division Hitler refused, remarkably stating he did not want to water down good Air Force troops with bad Army troops.

Several days later the two army groups had gathered enough troops to plan a counterattack by two divisions from the north and one from the south but on October 14 Hitler forbade it because he believed the force was not strong enough. Beginning the next day 3rd Shock Army attacked the villages of Moseevo and Izocha on the northeastern flank of the salient with the 100th Rifle Brigade and eventually all of 28th Rifle Division, supported on the right by the 165th and 379th Rifle Divisions of the newly-arrived 93rd Rifle Corps. While this attack was held by the German forces, it did capture more favorable jumping-off positions for 6th Guards Army which was moving into the region. At about this time the boundary between Kalinin Front and Baltic Front (2nd Baltic as of October 20) was shifted to bisect the salient from east to west, and 3rd Shock was reassigned to the latter Front. On October 19 Army Group Center proposed a joint effort to close the gap but Küchler declared he had no troops to spare due to the threat to Novosokolniki. Army Group Center then asked permission to proceed alone but Hitler again demurred; on October 26 the Army Group was forced to transfer the panzer division it had been holding in reserve for the counterattack which put paid to all such planning for the foreseeable future.

=== Renewed Soviet offensive ===
In an early morning fog on November 2 the 3rd and 4th Shock Armies penetrated the defenses of the left flank of 3rd Panzer Army southwest of Nevel. After the breakthrough, which opened a 16km-wide gap, 3rd Shock turned to the north behind the flank of 16th Army while 4th Shock moved southwest behind 3rd Panzer Army. 4th Shock's part was described by Maj. Gen. A. F. Beloborodov, commander of 2nd Guards Rifle Corps:

The offensive began during the first few days of November. Cooperating closely, the 3rd... and 4th Shock Armies delivered a strong attack south of Nevel, penetrated through the defile between the lakes and advanced rapidly to the northwest, west, and southwest. Since the depth of the penetration expanded but the mouth of the penetration remained narrow as before, a huge sack formed in the enemy defense. The 4th Shock Army's formations... menacingly hung over the Fascists' Gorodok grouping. In turn, while holding firm to the so-called Ezerishche salient, this grouping, whose apex dug its heels in at the mouth of the penetration, also represented a great danger for us.

On November 4 Hitler called Küchler and Busch to his headquarters. He characterized the October battle around Nevel as a Schweinerei (a filthy mess). At the close of the conference he ordered the two army groups to be ready on November 8 to counterattack from north and south and close the gap.

3rd Panzer Army did launch its attack on that date with the 87th Infantry and 20th Panzer Divisions. The latter was relatively strong with 29 Panzer IVs and three Panzer Vs. Beloborodov received an alarming report in the morning from his 156th Rifle Division which read, "The enemy are advancing and attacking 417th Rifle Regiment with up to 50 tanks and infantry." During the day the German force would advance as much as 8km between Lakes Ezerishche and Ordovo and capturing the villages of Blinki, Borok and several others. Beloborodov was forced to change the combat mission of his 47th Rifle Division to counterattack the penetration from the march. Army Group North was scheduled to attack from its side on the morning of November 9 but Küchler protested that all his units were tied down. Army Group Center accused Army Group North of refusing to attack simply "because it did not want to." Hitler refused to "accept any further excuses" and ordered Army Group North "as a matter of honor" to begin its counterattack no later than the next day. Küchler assembled a scratch force of seven battalions which attacked as ordered on November 10, ran into heavy artillery fire and then were thrown back to their line of departure by a counterattack.

On the night of November 9/10 the 4th Shock Army set about neutralizing the German breakthrough on its front. While 2nd Guards Corps contained 20th Panzer along the Gorodok-Nevel road, other forces of the Army regrouped and drove deep into the German rear areas. 357th and 119th Rifle Divisions advanced southwestward towards Polotsk while Beloborodov's 381st and 154th Rifle Divisions, supported by 236th Tank Brigade, wheeled southward to assault the German defenses at Gorodok from the west. 3rd Panzer Army moved 113th Infantry Division to block the advance on Gorodok while several combat groups covered the approaches to Polotsk. German resistance and deteriorating weather forced a temporary halt to the Soviet advance, but 20th Panzer was also forced to abandon its drive towards Nevel. While the immediate threat had been averted, on November 12 General Yeryomenko was chastised by the STAVKA for seeming to lose his composure over the German counterattacks:

The racket, which you kicked up about the attack of large enemy forces, supposedly up to two tank divisions from Ezerishche to Studenets, turned out to be a totally baseless and panicky report. This means that you personally and your staff accept in faith and do not verify all reports coming in from below.

This critique foreshadowed Yeryomenko's dismissal from command of 1st Baltic Front on November 19. He was replaced by Army Gen. I. K. Bagramyan, who had previously commanded the 11th Guards Army.

=== Drive on Pustoshka ===
3rd Shock Army's part in the renewed offensive began with a thorough reorganization. By the start of November the 178th, 185th and 357th Divisions had been replaced by the 115th, 146th and 326th Rifle and the 18th Guards Rifle Divisions. It also received the 34th Guards and 118th Tank Brigades. Shortly after the offensive began on November 2 the new commander of 2nd Baltic Front, Army Gen. M. M. Popov, further reinforced the Army with the 119th Guards and the 219th and 245th Rifle Divisions.

It was soon clear that 3rd Shock had been assigned the main effort in the renewed offensive. Küchler transferred six infantry battalions from 18th Army to cover 16th Army's new rear as its southernmost forces were becoming enveloped from three sides. The Soviet force headed deep into the German rear area towards its objective, the town of Pustoshka on the Velikiye Luki-Riga railroad line. By November 7 the 3rd Shock's lead elements had penetrated more than 30km deep on a 40 km front. By mid-month the 119th Guards Division, flanked by the 146th Division and supported the 118th Tanks, had taken Podbereze and directly threatened to cut the Novosokolniki-Pustoshka rail line. At around the same time the 6th Guards Army went over to the attack on the east side of the Nevel-Novosokolniki salient in an effort to link up with 3rd Shock and jointly isolate and destroy the XXXXIII Army Corps. This made almost no progress and 6th Guards went back to the defensive on November 15. About a week later 3rd Shock made several futile efforts to break through the German defenses east of Pustoshka but made only minimal gains and on November 21 General Popov ordered his entire Front over to the defensive.

2nd Baltic planned a new offensive to clear the salient in early January, 1944. However this was preempted beginning on December 29 when General Küchler began a phased withdrawal which took place over six days. This caught the Soviets by surprise and while 3rd Shock and 6th Guards hastily organized a pursuit this did nothing but harass the retreating Germans.

=== Drive on Vitebsk ===
11th Guards, like 6th Guards Army, had been originally committed in 2nd Baltic Front's sector of the salient, but from mid-November on were reassigned to 1st Baltic as STAVKA's priority became the drive on Gorodok and then Vitebsk. Despite an untimely thaw making the ground near impassable to vehicles on November 16 the 5th Tank Corps and 3rd Guards Cavalry Corps, backed by rifle divisions of 4th Shock Army, began an attack on November 16 that tore through the defenses of 3rd Panzer Army's 113th Division and by November 18 reached within 5km of the main road from Gorodok to Nevel. At 2300 hours that evening three tanks of the 5th Motorized Rifle Brigade with mounted infantry penetrated into Gorodok from the southwest and reportedly destroyed 25 German vehicles and two tanks, but this forward detachment could not be supported and was wiped out by elements of 20th Panzer by 0300 hours on November 19. For the next week fierce combat raged just west of Gorodok as the Soviet mobile troops repeatedly maneuvered and attacked to take the town. In response the German command withdrew the remainder of 20th Panzer and part of the 129th Infantry Division from their counterattack positions south of Nevel.

== Aftermath ==
On December 13 the 11th Guards Army attacked the northern tip of 3rd Panzer Army's flank from three sides and in two days had nearly completed encircling two German divisions in separate pockets. Reinhardt requested permission to take the front back but was refused as Hitler remained determined to close the gap. A day later the northern division was encircled and Reinhardt had no choice but to order a breakout which occurred on December 16 at the cost of 2,000 of its 7,000 troops and all of its artillery, heavy weapons and vehicles. On the same day Hitler conceded the impossibility of sealing off the salient, bringing this phase of the overall battle to a close.

== Order of Battle ==
=== Soviet ===
(as of October 1, 1943)

- Kalinin Front [after October 20 1st Baltic Front] (Army Gen. Andrey Yeryomenko)
  - 3rd Shock Army (Lt. Gen. Kuzma Galitsky)
    - 21st Guards Rifle Division
    - 46th Guards Rifle Division
    - 28th Rifle Division
    - 178th Rifle Division
    - 185th Rifle Division
    - 357th Rifle Division
    - 23rd, 31st, 100th Rifle Brigades
    - 5th, 118th Fortified Regions
    - 78th Tank Brigade
  - 4th Shock Army (Maj. Gen. Vasily Shvetsov) [from October 16, Lieutenant General]
    - 2nd Guards Rifle Corps (Maj. Gen. A. F. Beloborodov)
      - 16th Lithuanian Rifle Division
      - 117th Rifle Division
      - 360th Rifle Division
    - 83rd Rifle Corps (Maj. Gen. Anatoly Dyakonov)
      - 47th Rifle Division
      - 234th Rifle Division
      - 235th Rifle Division
      - 381st Rifle Division
    - 42nd Rifle Corps (Maj. Gen. Konstantin Kolganov)
      - 332nd Rifle Division
      - 358th Rifle Division
      - 101st Rifle Brigade
    - 334th Rifle Division
    - 145th Rifle Brigade
    - 155th Fortified Region
    - 171st Tank Battalion

=== German ===
(as of October 1, 1943)

- Army Group North, (Generalfeldmarschall Georg von Küchler)
  - 16th Army (Field Marshal Ernst Busch on October 1; Gen. Christian Hansen from October 11)
    - XXXXIII Army Corps (Generalleutnant Karl von Oven)
      - 205th Infantry Division
      - 83rd Infantry Division
      - 263rd Infantry Division
- Army Group Center, (Field Marshal Günther von Kluge on October 1; Field Marshal Ernst Busch from October 29)
  - 3rd Panzer Army (Col. Gen. Georg-Hans Reinhardt)
    - II Luftwaffe Field Corps (Gen. der Flieger Alfred Schlemm)
      - 2nd Luftwaffe Field Division
      - 6th Luftwaffe Field Division
      - 3rd Luftwaffe Field Division
      - 4th Luftwaffe Field Division

== In popular culture ==
A Local Skirmish (2017) movie directed by Aleksey Kozlov portrays an event from that war.
