= 8th Luftwaffe Field Division =

8th Luftwaffe Field Division (8. Luftwaffen-Feld-Division)
- Active: 1942–1943
- Country: Nazi Germany
- Branch: Luftwaffe
- Type: Infantry
- Size: Division
- Engagements: World War II; Eastern Front; Operation Little Saturn

The 8th Luftwaffe Field Division (German: 8. Luftwaffen-Feld-Division) was an infantry division of the Luftwaffe branch of the Wehrmacht that fought in World War II. It was formed using surplus Luftwaffe ground crew in Luftgau III and Luftgau IV at Troop Training Ground Mlawa (Mielau) in East Prussia. From Flieger-Regiment 42, which was an expansion of Flieger Ersatz-Abteilung 42. This unit had been created in April 1939 as an air force replacement battalion. In 1941 was stationed at Salzwedel in Luftgau XI in Hannover. In October 1942 it was disbanded and its two battalions became the core of the 8th Luftwaffe Field Division. Like its predecessors the initial rifle complement included Four Independently led Jager Battalions no regimental headquarters. Two regimental headquarters, Jager-Regiments 15 and 16 were supposed to have been formed but because the formation was committed so rapidly and destroyed so quickly, this never occurred. The Artillery Battalion was composed of two batteries of towed Czech made Škoda 75 mm Model 15 mountain guns with four guns each. While the Third battery was equipped with five Sturmgeschutz III 75mm L24 short barreled Assault Guns. The rest of the Division consisted of a Panzer-Jager Battalion, a signals company, an engineer company, and a supply column. Plus the Flak Battalion contained three Batteries armed with 24 single barreled Flak 38 2 cm Flak 30, Flak 38 and Flakvierling 38, and 4 Flak 36 8.8 cm Flak 18/36/37/41 guns. It served on the Southern Sector of the Eastern Front along the Chir and Don River sectors from late 1942 to April/May 1943 as part of Armee-Abteilung Hollidt. (Note: A Luftwaffe ground unit operating under Oberst Rainer Stahel consisting of Luftwaffe Supply and support troops, ground crews and airmen, security and even flak troops. Operated as independently Kampfgruppe Stahel from December 1942 until January 1943, whilst nominally being part of the 8th Luftwaffe Field Division's command.) when it was disbanded and the remnant parts were absorbed by 15th Luftwaffe Field Division.

== Operational history ==
The 8th Luftwaffe Field Division was one of several Luftwaffe divisions formed in 1942 from surplus ground crew and intended to serve as conventional infantry divisions. The 8th was raised in October 1942, under the command of Oberst Hans Heidemeyer. (Note: The rank of generalmajor is equivalent to that of a brigadier general in the United States Army.)

The division initially comprised battalions of infantry, a battalion of field artillery, a Panzer-Jager battalion and engineer, signal and supply units. It was sent to the southern sector of the Eastern Front, where it fought at Operation Little Saturn along the Chir and Don River sectors. It was smashed and scattered in the face of the Soviet advance when first advancing towards where it expected to find retreating German troops. (Note: With the Panzer-Jager battalion in advance marching across snow swept stepes in ran headlong into Soviet pincers and was scattered in a matter of hours. Establishing a collection point at Nizhne Chirskaya near the confluence of the Don/Chir Rivers the survivors of the bloody battle gathered. When only 12 men returned from the advanced elements of the division, the commander of the Panzer-Jager battalion committed suicide.)Remnants of the division made a fighting withdrawal towards Tatsinskaya Airfield, where it faced the Soviet 24th and 25th Tank Corps. In December 1942 its four Jager battalions were reduced to two and the panzer-jager battalion was completely lost.

The remnants of the 8th Luftwaffe Field Division followed the withdrawal of other German forces from the Caucasus in January and February 1943, whilst still operating under XVII Armeecorps. In April/May 1943 it was disbanded and the remnant parts were absorbed by 15th Luftwaffe Field Division. Having existed for only three or four months the 8th Luftwaffe Field Division has the dubious distinction of being considered one of the worst units raised under the auspices of the German Luftwaffe.

== Commanders ==
- Oberst Hans Heidemeyer (October 1942-January 1943) (partly);
- Oberst Rainer Stahel (December 1942–January 1943) (partly);
- Generalleutnant Wilibald Spang (January 1943–February 1943); (Note: It is not clear who commanded the division during the period from February 1943 to May 1943. Ranks stated are those at the time of taking command.)

== Notes ==
Footnotes

Citations
