= II Luftwaffe Field Corps =

German military unit

II Luftwaffe Field Corps (II.Luftwaffen-Feld-Corps)
- Active: 1942–1943
- Country: Nazi Germany
- Branch: Luftwaffe
- Type: Infantry
- Size: Corps
- Engagements: World War II; Eastern Front; Battle of Nevel (1943)

The II Luftwaffe Field Corps (German: 4.Luftwaffen-Feld-Corps) was an infantry Corps of the Luftwaffe branch of the Wehrmacht that fought in World War II. Formed in early 1943 to command Luftwaffe Field Division's that were intended to serve as infantry, its personnel were largely drawn from surplus Luftwaffe ground crew. This was done as a response by Hermann Göring to the request from the Ostheer, that surplus ground & aircrew no longer needed could serve as infantry in the Wehrmacht. This he said, was to preserve their 'fervent National Socialist Values', as all Luftwaffe personnel had undergone 'Nazi' ideology Indoctrination- something which had not been done in the Wehrmacht, who were seen by the Nazis as 'elitist' with class values emanating from the days of the Kaiser.

During its existence it was under the command of Alfred Schlemm and it was part of Georg-Hans Reinhardt's 3rd Panzer Army, it had under its command the 2nd, 3rd, 4th and 6th Luftwaffe Field Divisions. The Corps had the task of securing the connection between Army Groups North and Center & defended this sector against Soviet operations. It fought in the Battle of Nevel (1943) and other Battles in the Autumn/Winter of 1943 around Vitebsk in Byelorussia. In November 1943, responsibility for the Luftwaffe Field divisions was transferred to the Army and the Corps was disbanded.

== Commanders ==
- Generalleutnant Alfred Schlemm

== Notes ==
Footnotes

Citations
