= 7th Luftwaffe Field Division =

7th Luftwaffe Field Division (7. Luftwaffen-Feld-Division)
- Active: 1942–1943
- Country: Nazi Germany
- Branch: Luftwaffe
- Type: Infantry
- Size: Division
- Engagements: World War II; Eastern Front; Operation Little Saturn; Operation Winter Storm

The 7th Luftwaffe Field Division (German: 7. Luftwaffen-Feld-Division) was an infantry division of the Luftwaffe branch of the Wehrmacht that fought in World War II. It was formed using surplus Luftwaffe ground crew in Luftgau III & Luftgau IV at Troop Training Ground Gross-Born, but was soon shifted to Troop Training Ground Mlawa (Mielau) in East Prussia. Unlike its predecessors the initial rifle complement only included three Independently led Jager Battalions instead of the usual four. It wasn't until December 1942 that the IV Jager Battalion was added. But Like other Luftwaffe Field Divisions initially when first formed the unit's infantry complement contained no regimental headquarters. The Artillery Battalion was composed of two batteries of towed (by the Raupenschlepper Ost or Opel Blitz vehicles)10.5 cm leFH 18M howitzer batteries with four guns each. While the Third battery was equipped with five Sturmgeschütz III 75mm L24 short barreled Assault Guns. Exactly the same as the 6th Luftwaffe Field Division. The Panzer-Jager Battalion was composed of two companies of 5 cm Pak 38 Anti-Tank Guns, but they were also equipped with the 7.5 cm Pak 40 Anti Tank Guns. The third company were only equipped with the 5 cm Pak 38 Anti Tank Guns. The Flak Battalion contained three Batteries armed with 24 single barreled Flak 38 2 cm Flak 30, Flak 38 and Flakvierling 38, and 4 Flak 36 8.8 cm Flak 18/36/37/41. It served on the Southern Sector of the Eastern Front from late 1942 to May 1943 under Army Group Don, when was disbanded.

== Operational history ==
The 7th Luftwaffe Field Division was one of several Luftwaffe divisions formed in 1942 from surplus ground crew and intended to serve as conventional infantry divisions. The 7th was raised in October 1942, under the command of Generalmajor Wolf Freiherr von Biedermann. (Note: The rank of generalmajor is equivalent to that of a brigadier general in the United States Army.)

The division comprised initially of three battalions of infantry (later four), a battalion of field artillery, a Panzer-Jager battalion and engineer, signal and supply units. It was sent to the southern sector of the Eastern Front, where it fought at Operation Little Saturn & at Operation Winter Storm. It soon withdrew in the face of the Soviet advance and was engaged in the further fighting around the Chir river line from February to May 1943.

In December 1942, the division was assigned to XXXXVIII Panzer Corps to man the Upper Chir River line as part of Operation Winter Storm. However its part was brief as late arriving Panzer units from the Caucasus and continued Soviet assaults as part of Operation Little Saturn curtailed relief attempts. In March & April 1943 the Divisions remnants were shifted to Defending the Mius River Line. In May 1943 the Division was disbanded and its remaining parts absorbed by Felddivision 15 (L).

== Commanders ==
- Generalmajor Wolf Freiherr von Biedermann (November 1942-January 1943);
- Generalleutnant Wilibald Spang (January 1943–February 1943); (Note: It is not clear who commanded the division during the period from February 1943 to May 1943. Ranks stated are those at the time of taking command.)

== Notes ==
Footnotes

Citations
