= Igor Zakharkin =

Igor Vladimirovich Zakharkin (Russian: Игорь Владимирович Захаркин; born March 16, 1958, Bryansk, RSFSR, USSR) is a former head coach of Russian national hockey team. Honored coach of Russia. Head of the Department of ice hockey Russian State University of Physical Education, Sport, Youth and Tourism.

In the early 2000s he was a gymnastics teacher in Säter, Sweden.

June 30, 2009 awarded Order of Honour for his great contribution to the victory of the national team of Russia on hockey at the world championships in 2008 and 2009.
