= LIII Army Corps =

The LIII Army Corps (53rd Army Corps, German: LIII. Armeekorps) was a corps of the German Army during World War II. It was first deployed in 1941 and was active as part of various armies under Army Group Centre until 1944, when it was destroyed during the Soviet Red Army operations Bagration and Kutuzov in June and July 1944. The corps suffered enormous casualties as a result of the Soviet attacks. All of its divisions were destroyed and all but a few of the soldiers were killed or captured by the Soviet Union. A new formation named LIII Army Corps was subsequently deployed in December 1944, when it was assigned to Seventh Army and fought on the western front until surrendering to United States Army forces in April 1945.

== History ==
=== First Deployment, 1941—1944 ===
==== 1941 ====
The Generalkommando of LIII Army Corps was first deployed on 15 February 1941, in Wehrkreis XVIII (Salzburg). The initial commander was Karl Weisenberger, formerly the commander of 71st Infantry Division. LIII Corps was put under 11th Army from April to May 1941, before being transferred to 2nd Army in June. It participated in Operation Barbarossa as part of 4th Army's reserve troops. Its initial divisions for Barbarossa were the 45th Infantry Division, 52nd Infantry Division, and 167th Infantry Division. In the early days of the fighting, LIII Army Corps stayed as part of 4th Army's reserve, but assisted German advances in Belarus, including at the Battle of Białystok–Minsk, when LIII Army Corps assisted the army group's right flank at Malaryta.

Eventually, LIII Army Corps became part of 2nd Army in August.

On 25 October 1941, LIII Army Corps, still under the command of Weisenberger, became part of 2nd Panzer Army, commanded by Heinz Guderian. 112th Infantry Division and 167th Infantry Division were given to the corps as part of this reassignment. XXXXIII Army Corps was also added to 2nd Panzer Army at the same time. LIII Army Corps joined 2nd Panzer Army at the Oka River on 26 October and assisted the 4th Army on 2nd Panzer Army's left flank in defensive operations against Russian counterattacks. Red Army movements east of 2nd Panzer Army led Guderian to then redeploy LIII Army Corps to the right flank at the line between Yepifan and Stalinogorsk. LIII Army Corps, advancing some 9 kilometers north of Spasskoye-Penkova, met heavy Soviet resistance in the form of two cavalry divisions, five rifle divisions and a tank brigade that were approaching from Yefremov towards Tula with the intention to attack XXIV Army Corps units that were bogged down south of Tula. The Soviet forces were surprised by the presence of LIII Army Corps just as LIII Army Corps was surprised by the sudden arrival of heavy Soviet forces, and a battle was fought between the 3 November and 13 November. This battle became known as the Battle of Tyoploye (or Battle of Teploje), after the village of Tyoploye. After reinforcements from Heinrich Eberbach's armored Kampfgruppe arrived, the Soviet forces were repelled and over 3,000 Red Army soldiers taken prisoner. Subsequently, Eberbach's Kampfgruppe was attached to LIII Army Corps. In the meantime, the bitter winter of 1941 was starting to cause serious casualties to German infantry formations, as infantry companies were reduced in fighting strength by the effects of the cold temperature and hostile weather.

On 26 November, LIII Army Corps reached the Don river. 167th Infantry Division crossed the Don close to its source at Ivan-Ozero.

In December, 29th Infantry Division was added to LIII Army Corps. On 19 December, LIII Army Corps and XXXXVII Army Corps took positions against the Soviet winter offensive of 1941. After several days of relentless Soviet attacks, leaving 167th Infantry Division heavily battered, Guderian judged the defensive value of LIII Army Corps as only limited. The Soviets dislodged LIII Army Corps from its position by 25 December.

==== 1942 ====
By January 1942, 29th Infantry Division was removed, and Division "Großdeutschland" and 56th Infantry Division, were added.

By 6 February, 25th Infantry Division was added. By 10 March, 17th Panzer Division had joined LIII Army Corps. By 5 April, 17th Panzer Division had been transferred to XXIV Army Corps and Großdeutschland to XXXXVII Army Corps. This left LIII Army Corps with 25th, 56th, 112th and 296th Infantry Divisions. By 11 May, 134th Infantry Division had joined LIII Army Corps. This setup remained in place until July.

By 5 August, 11th Panzer Division and 26th Infantry Division were transferred to LIII Army Corps, whereas 134th Infantry Division was transferred away. By 2 September, 11th Panzer Division was removed from and 17th and 20th Panzer Divisions added to the corps. 56th Infantry Division was also transferred away. By 8 October, large amounts of the corps were transferred away, including 17th and 20th Panzer Divisions. LIII was left with 25th, 26th, 112th and 296th Infantry Divisions. These divisions were joined until 5 November by 134th Infantry Division, which returned to the corps after being transferred away in July, as well as 52nd Infantry Division, which had been part of LIII Army Corps during the beginning of Operation Barbarossa, and 293rd Infantry Division. 26th Infantry was transferred away. This setup remained unchanged until 1 December. During December, 52nd Infantry Division was transferred away.

==== 1943 ====
On 1 January 1943, LIII Army Corps, still part of 2nd Panzer Army, consisted of 25th, 112th, 134th, 293rd and 296th Infantry Divisions. This setup remained unchanged throughout January and February 1943. By 9 April, 134th Infantry Division and 296th Infantry Division had been transferred to LV Army Corps, and 211th Infantry Division joined LIII Army Corps from Corps Scheele. This setup remained unchanged through April and May 1943. By 7 July, 112th Infantry Division, part of the division since January 1942, was transferred away and 208th Infantry Division joined LIII Army Corps. By 5 August, the entire corps was reassembled. All divisions, including the 25th, 208th, 211th and 293rd Infantry Divisions, were assigned to other army corps, whereas the LIII Army Corps was tasked with overseeing 20th Infantry Division and 34th Infantry Division, as well as 26th Infantry Division, which was already part of LIII Army Corps once before, between July and October 1942. Additionally, 18th Panzer Division also joined the corps.

By September 1943, LIII Army Corps was unassigned from 2nd Panzer Army and put into Army Group Centre's reserve, in preparation for a transfer to 3rd Panzer Army. Its divisions were transferred away.

In October 1943, it became a subordinate of 3rd Panzer Army with 246th Infantry Division and 256th Infantry Division attached. These divisions were subsequently transferred to VI Army Corps, whereas LIII Army Corps was assigned 3rd and 4th Luftwaffe Field Divisions in December 1943.

==== 1944 ====
3rd and 4th Luftwaffe Field Divisions were joined by 2nd and 6th Luftwaffe Field Divisions, as well as 14th, 129th, and 197th Infantry Divisions, by 1 January 1944. By February, 2nd and 3rd Luftwaffe Field Divisions were transferred away, as were 14th and 129th Infantry Divisions. Instead, LIII Army Corps was joined by 20th Panzer Division, previously part of the corps in 1942, and once again by 246th Infantry Division, which had been part of VI Army Corps in the meantime. As an exchange, 14th Infantry Division, previously with LIII Army Corps, was now transferred to VI Army Corps. By 3 of March, 20th Panzer Division had been transferred away to 9th Army's LV Army Corps, whereas 197th Infantry Division now joined VI Army Corps. In exchange, LIII Army Corps was joined by 95th Infantry Division. 95th Infantry Division was transferred away by 15 April 1944 with no replacement, leaving LIII Army Corps with 4th and 6th Luftwaffe Field Divisions as well as 206th and 246th Infantry Divisions. This makeup did not change until the major Soviet attacks in June 1944.

The corps was largely destroyed while part of 3rd Panzer Army under Army Group Centre. This was a result of the Red Army's Operation Bagration in June 1944. When the Soviet Operation Kutuzov hit LIII Army Corps beginning on 12 July, the Soviet troops advanced with an artillery density of more than 200 guns per kilometer of front, whereas LIII Army Corps could only offer 1.7 barrelled weapons per kilometer as a resistance.

3rd Panzer Army fell into military disaster in the Vitebsk salient, where it was ordered to stand its ground against overwhelming Soviet forces instead of mounting a fighting retreat. This came as a result of a direct order from Adolf Hitler and could thus not be overruled by local military commanders. By 24 June, there was a gap between the German units that exposed the rear of LIII Army Corps. On the request from the local commanders to obtain consent from Hitler and the high command to retreat out of Vitebsk and with the urgent message from Ernst Busch that 24 June was the last day where this operation might be possible, Kurt Zeitzler personally flew to the Berghof in Berchtesgaden, where he was instead instructed to confirm Hitler's original command that 3rd Panzer Army was to stand its ground to the last. Soviet troops captured the last remaining road connecting LIII Army Corps with the German lines on the same day. Friedrich Gollwitzer, commander of LIII Army Corps, decided to disobey Hitler's orders and attempt to escape with his forces towards German positions. Several breakout attempts were undertaken on 25 June and 26 June, but the Soviets had already reinforced the ring. The final breakout attempt and the last signal from LIII Army Corps was received in the early morning hours of 27 June, when large parts of the corps attempted the westwards breach through Soviet-controlled areas that were now 80 kilometers deep. Of the 28,000 soldiers who attempted the breakout, some 10,000 were taken prisoner. Only a small number reached the German lines, whereas the rest perished during the attempt.

While there was an initial order given on 26 July 1944 to use the remnants of LIII Army Corps to reinforce XXXXI Panzer Corps, the remainders of the corps were instead mostly transferred to the Waffen-SS and used by XII SS Army Corps. LIII Corps was one of five Generalkommando units of Army Group Centre to be destroyed as a result of Bagration, along with XII, XXVII, XXXV and XXXXI. At the end of July 1944, the status of LIII Army Corps was simply noted as whereabouts unknown ('Verbleib unbekannt').

=== Second Deployment, 1944—1945 ===
The corps was deployed again on 11 November 1944 as part of Wehrkreis XX (Danzig), using parts of the Generalkommando of Von Rothkirch, the former Army Group Rear Area Commander for Army Group Centre who was now assigned to lead LIII Army Corps. The corps was partially filled by troops of LIV Army Corps.

Around 21:00 on 15 April 1945, 7th U.S. Armored Division received an envoy from LIII Corps offering surrender, which was formally accepted around 02:00 at night on 16 April 1945 and went into force on 03:00 later that morning. 7th Armored Division dignitaries arrived at LIII Corps HQ around 07:00 on the 16th, and take its key officers prisoner, bringing them back to the American division's headquarters by 11:00. The surrender of the city of Iserlohn was also included in that final action of LIII Corps. The final commander at the time of surrender was Fritz Bayerlein.

== Commanders ==
=== First Deployment ===
- Karl Weisenberger: 15 Feb 1941 — 1 Dec 1941
- Walther Fischer von Weikersthal: 1 Dec 1941 — 25 Jan 1942
- Erich-Heinrich Clößner: 25 Jan 1942 — 22 Jun 1943
- Friedrich Gollwitzer: 22 Jun 1943 — 26 Jun 1944

=== Second Deployment ===
- Edwin Graf von Rothkirch und Trach: 11 Nov 1944 — 6 Mar 1945 (POW)
- Walter Botsch: 6 Mar 1945 — 24 Mar 1945
- Fritz Bayerlein: 24 Mar 1945 — 15 Apr 1945
