= 3rd Luftwaffe Field Division =

German military unit

3rd Luftwaffe Field Division (3.Luftwaffen-Feld-Division)
- Active: 1942–1944
- Country: Nazi Germany
- Branch: Luftwaffe
- Type: Infantry
- Size: Division
- Engagements: World War II; Eastern Front; Battle of Nevel (1943)

The 3rd Luftwaffe Field Division (German: 3.Luftwaffen-Feld-Division) was an infantry division of the Luftwaffe branch of the Wehrmacht that fought in World War II. It was formed using surplus ground crew of the Luftwaffe at Troop Training Ground Gross-Born in Pomerania on 19 September 1942. It served on the Eastern Front as art of Army Group Centre from late 1942 to early 1944 at which time it was disbanded.

== Operational history ==
The 3rd Luftwaffe Field Division, one of several such divisions of the Luftwaffe (German Air Force), was formed on 19 September 1942 at the Gross-Born Troop Maneuver Area in Pomerania, under the command of Generalmajor (Note: The rank of generalmajor is equivalent to that of brigadier general in the United States Army.) Robert Pistorious. Intended to serve as infantry, its personnel were largely drawn from surplus Luftwaffe ground crew.

Towards the end of 1942, the division was assigned to Army Group Centre on the Eastern Front and fought in the Battle of Nevel in 1943 as part of the II Luftwaffe Field Corps under the command of Alfred Schlemm. The division had the task of securing the connection between Army Groups North and Centre and defended this sector against Soviet operations.

Responsibility for the division was transferred to the Army on 1 November 1943 and it was designated 3rd Field Division (L). Later that month, it participated in actions at Vitebsk against the Soviet Army and remained on the front lines until January 1944. Shortly afterwards, after suffering heavy losses in the fighting at Vitebsk, the division was disbanded. Surviving personnel were absorbed by the 4th and 6th Luftwaffe Field Divisions.

== Commanders ==
- Generalmajor Robert Pistorius (Note: Pistorious was later promoted to generalleutnant, which is equivalent to the rank of major general in the United States Army.) (Sep 1942 – Jan 1944).

== Notes ==
Footnotes

Citations
