= 4th Luftwaffe Field Division =

German military unit

4th Luftwaffe Field Division (4.Luftwaffen-Feld-Division)
- Active: 1942–1944
- Country: Nazi Germany
- Branch: Luftwaffe
- Type: Infantry
- Size: Division
- Engagements: World War II; Eastern Front; Battle of Nevel (1943); Operation Bagration

The 4th Luftwaffe Field Division (German: 4.Luftwaffen-Feld-Division) was an infantry division of the Luftwaffe branch of the Wehrmacht that fought in World War II. It was formed at Gross-Born Troop Maneuver Area with men who had trained at Flieger-Ausbildungs Regiment 14 in Austria and surplus ground crew of the Luftwaffe. It served on the Eastern Front from late 1942 to June 1944 in Army Group Centre's area of operations and took part in the Battle of Nevel. It subsequently fought in engagements in the Velish, Nevel and Vitbesk sectors until it was destroyed during Operation Bagration.

== Operational history ==
The 4th Luftwaffe Field Division, one of several Luftwaffe Field Divisions of the Luftwaffe (German Air Force), was formed in mid-1942 in Gross-Born Troop Maneuver Area, under the command of Oberst Rainer Stahel. (Note: The rank of oberst is equivalent to that of colonel in the United States Army.) Intended to serve as infantry, its personnel were largely drawn from surplus Luftwaffe ground crew as well as men who were training at Flieger-Ausbildungs Regiment 14 in Austria. In November 1942, it was assigned to Army Group Centre on the Eastern Front. Posted to a sector near Vitebsk as part of the II Luftwaffe Field Corps, commanded by Alfred Schlemm, it had the task of securing the connection between Army Groups North and Centre and defended this sector against Soviet operations. It fought in the Battle of Nevel and through the autumn/winter of 1943 around Vitebsk in Byelorussia.

In November 1943, responsibility for the division was transferred to the Army and it was renamed 4th Field Division (L). Its Field Jager battalions became the 49th, 50th and 51st Jager regiments. Early the following year, it received some of the surviving personnel of the 3rd Field Division (L), which had just been disbanded. In the summer of 1944, the 4th Field Division (L) was still defending Vitebsk as part of the LIII Corps in the 3rd Panzer Army. When the Red Army began the Vitebsk–Orsha Offensive of Operation Bagration on 22 June 1944, the corps was surrounded within days. Encircled at Vitebsk it was subsequently destroyed, along with LIII Corps, with the divisional commander, Generalleutnant (Note: The rank of generalleutnant is equivalent to that of major general in the United States Army.) Robert Pistorious, killed in action.

== Commanders ==
- Oberst Rainer Stahel (September–November 1942); (Note: Ranks stated are those at the time of taking command.)
- Oberst Wilhelm Völk (November 1942–April 1943);
- Oberst Hans-Georg Schreder (April–November 1943);
- Generalmajor Hans Sauerbrey (November 1943); (Note: The rank of generalmajor is equivalent to that of brigadier general in the United States Army.)
- Generalmajor Ernst Klepp (November 1943–January 1944);
- Generalleutnant Robert Pistorius † (January 1944–June 1944).

== Notes ==
Footnotes

Citations
