= Alfred Schlemm =

German Luftwaffe general (1894–1986)

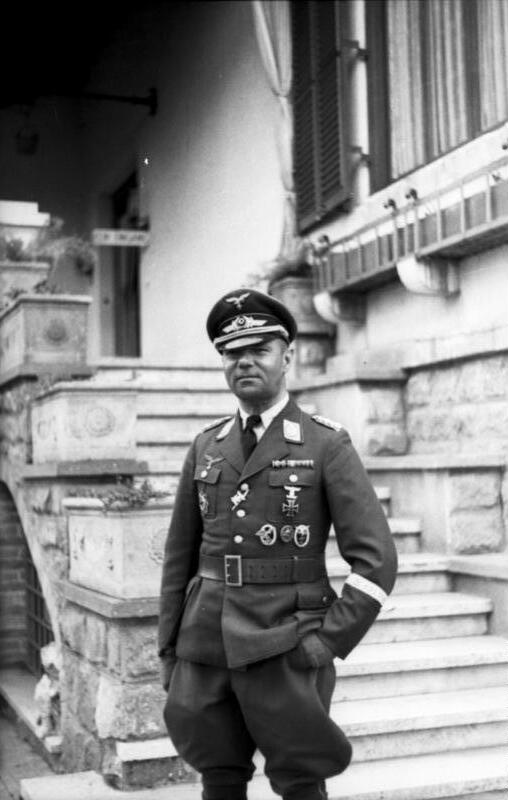
- Born: 18 December 1894; Rudolstadt, German Empire
- Died: 24 January 1986 (aged 91); Ahlten, West Germany
- Military career
- Allegiance: German Empire; Weimar Republic; Nazi Germany
- Branch: Luftwaffe
- Service years: 1913–1945
- Rank: General der Fallschirmtruppe
- Commands: 11th Air Corps; 1st Air Division; II Luftwaffe Field Corps; 1st Parachute Corps; 1st Parachute Army
- Conflicts: World War I; World War II; Battle of Anzio; Battle of the Reichswald
- Awards: Knight's Cross of the Iron Cross

Alfred Schlemm (18 December 1894 – 24 January 1986) was a German General der Fallschirmtruppe in the Luftwaffe. His last command in World War II opposed the advance of the First Canadian Army through the Reichswald in February 1945.

== Early life and military career ==
Schlemm joined the Prussian Army in 1913. During the inter-war years, Schlemm served in a variety of staff, training and regimental posts until, in October 1937, he was attached to the Reich Air Ministry. In February 1938, he transferred from the Army to the Luftwaffe and was appointed to the Luftwaffe General Staff and in June 1938, he became Chief of Staff of Air Defense Zone West.

== World War II ==
In October 1939, he became Chief of Staff of Luftgau [Air Zone] XI, under Generalleutnant Ludwig Wolff and in December 1940, Schlemm was appointed Chief of Staff of the XI Air Corps under General der Flieger Kurt Student. The Corps was the headquarters staff of Germany's parachute and air landing forces which, on 20 May 1941, the Germans used for Operation Merkur, the airborne invasion of Crete. At least 6,000 airborne troops were lost and the conquest of Crete effectively ended all plans for large-scale German airborne operations.

=== Eastern Front ===
From February 1942, Schlemm was attached to the General Command of the 8th Air Corps (Generaloberst Wolfram Freiherr von Richthofen) on the Eastern Front, where he became Commander of Luftwaffen-Gefechtsverbande ("Battle Formation") Schlemm assigned to the XXXX Panzer Corps and the LVI Panzer Corps in General der Infanterie Gotthard Heinrici’s 4th Army. Schlemm became commander of the 1st Air Division in June 1942.

In October 1942, he became Commanding General of the II Luftwaffe Field Corps on the Eastern Front. Schlemm's corps comprised four Luftwaffe Field Divisions and held the line from south of Nevel to the Dvina River east of Vitebsk, under the 3rd Panzer Army of Army Group Centre. In February and March 1943, the II Luftwaffe Field Corps participated in Operation Kugelblitz against the Soviet partisans northeast of Vitebsk. On 6 October 1943, part of Schlemm's corps collapsed under a major Soviet attack, resulting in a 10-mile gap in the German lines and the abandonment of Nevel. The entire II Luftwaffe Field Corps fell back to new positions west of Gorodok.

=== Italy ===
Withdrawn from the line in November 1943, Schlemm's four divisions were attached to the LIII and IX Army Corps and were transferred to Italy. On 1 January 1944, Schlemm's headquarters staff, redesignated as 1st Parachute Corps, took control of a reserve force of 24,000 troops in the Rome area. They were initially dispatched from Rome to bolster the Winter Line along the Garigliano River, but soon Schlemm's corps were urgently transferred to oppose the Allied beachhead at Anzio (Operation Shingle). Schlemm led the German troops for three days until command formally passed to Generaloberst Eberhard von Mackensen, Commander-in-Chief of the 14th Army. The Corps fought at Anzio for the next three months. Schlemm was cited in the official Armed Forces Communiqué and received the Knight's Cross of the Iron Cross for his efforts.

After the Winter Line was breached at Cassino and the Anzio bridgehead breakout, Schlemm's Corps joined the German withdrawal through central Italy. By August 1944, they were lodged in the Arno and Gothic Line defensive positions in the northern Apennine Mountains. Schlemm relinquished command of the Corps to Generalleutnant Richard Heidrich.

=== Reichswald ===
Schlemm succeeded Generaloberst Kurt Student as Commander-in-Chief of the 1st Parachute Army on the Western Front in the Netherlands. The 1st Parachute Army was engaged defending the Reichswald against the Canadian First Army during Operation Veritable.

The Canadian First Army and Lieutenant-General William Hood Simpson's U.S. Ninth Army compressed Schlemm's forces into a small bridgehead on the west bank of the Rhine opposite Wesel. On 10 March 1945, the rearguard of the 1st Parachute Army evacuated their bridgehead, destroying the bridge behind them. He was wounded in an air attack on his command post at Haltern eleven days later and command of his forces passed to General Günther Blumentritt. Schlemm was transferred to a hospital near Westerland and then remained in the Führerreserve until the end of the war. From May 8, 1945 to March 22, 1948, he was a British prisoner of war.

== Post-war ==
After the war Schlemm lived in the Schlemm family's manor house in Ahlten near Hannover and wrote articles about the war. In these he took the view that it was wrong to call the sacrifice of soldiers' lives vain. He died on 24 January 1986 at Ahlten.

== Awards and decorations ==
- Clasp to the Iron Cross (1939) 2nd Class (10 August 1940) & 1st Class (22 June 1941)
- German Cross in Gold on 4 August 1942 as Generalleutnant in the XXI. Flieger-Korps
- Knight's Cross of the Iron Cross on 11 June 1944 as General der Fallschirmtruppe and commander of I. Fallschirm-Korps

Military offices
Preceded by General Martin Fiebig	Commander of 1. Flieger-Division (1942-1945); 1 July 1942 – 1 October 1942	Succeeded by Generalleutnant Hermann Plocher
Preceded by None	Commander of II Luftwaffe Field Corps; 1 October 1942 - 31 December 1943	Succeeded by None
Preceded by None	Commander of 1st Parachute Corps; 1 January 1944 - 1 November 1944	Succeeded by General der Fallschirmtruppe Richard Heidrich
Preceded by Generaloberst Kurt Student	Commander of 1. Fallschirmarmee; 18 November 1944 – 20 March 1945	Succeeded by General der Infanterie Günther Blumentritt
