= 158th Rifle Division =

158th Rifle Division (September 15, 1939 – August 18, 1941) 158th Rifle Division (January 20, 1942 - June 1945)
- Active: 1939–1945
- Country: Soviet Union
- Branch: Red Army
- Type: Infantry
- Size: Division
- Engagements: Operation Barbarossa; Battle of Smolensk (1941); Battle of Moscow; Toropets–Kholm offensive Battles of Rzhev; Operation Büffel; Smolensk operation Polotsk-Vitebsk offensive Operation Bagration; Baltic offensive Šiauliai offensive Kaunas offensive Operation Doppelkopf; Riga offensive (1944); Courland Pocket
- Decorations: Order of the Red Banner (2); Order of Suvorov (both 2nd Formation)
- Battle honours: Liozno; Vitebsk (both 2nd Formation)

Commanders
- Notable commanders: Col. Vitalii Ivanovich Novozhilov; Col. Stepan Efimovich Isaev; Maj. Gen. Aleksei Ivanovich Zugin; Maj. Gen. Mikhail Mikhailovich Busarov; Maj. Gen. Ivan Semyonovich Bezuglyi; Col. Demyan Ilich Goncharov

The 158th Rifle Division was originally formed as an infantry division of the Red Army on September 15, 1939, in the North Caucasus Military District, based on the shtat (table of organization and equipment) of that month. After remaining in that District through 1940 it was moving through Ukraine in June 1941 as part of 19th Army when the German invasion began. Shortly after arriving at the fighting front it was pocketed by forces of Army Group Center west of Smolensk, along with most of its Army. The division fought in semi-encirclement through the latter half of July under command of 16th Army, suffering heavy casualties, before its remnants were able to withdraw across the Dniepr River in the first days of August. These came under 20th Army briefly before the 158th was disbanded by August 15.

The second division of this number was designated in January 1942 from the 5th Moscow Workers Rifle Division, which had been defending the Soviet capital since the previous November. After a brief period of reorganization it was assigned to the 22nd Army of Kalinin Front deep inside the Toropets salient. In April it was reassigned to 30th Army, then to 39th Army in August, and it was under this command in November and December during Operation Mars, taking part in the difficult fighting at the northern tip of the Rzhev salient. It made minor gains here at considerable cost, and in March 1943 followed up the German evacuation. After a pause through the spring it took part in the August offensive to retake Smolensk, and when this was accomplished the 158th advanced toward Vitebsk, winning a battle honor in the process. During the hard-fought battles of the winter and spring near this city, as part of the 84th Rifle Corps, it made minor gains while taking significant casualties. When the summer of 1944 offensive began it was positioned to the southeast of Vitebsk, and within days assisted the 145th Rifle Division in clearing the city of German forces; in recognition it was awarded the Order of the Red Banner. Following this it advanced into Lithuania as part of 1st Baltic Front. In August it received the Order of Suvorov for its part in the battle for Kaunas, but later that month one of its rifle regiments was encircled and largely destroyed during a German counteroffensive. The remaining regiments gained distinctions in the final fighting near Riga in October, but as the Soviet advance continued the 158th remained in Lithuania, eventually being rebuilt in March 1945 from the disbanded 145th, inheriting the latter's awards. Once this was complete it moved into Germany with 14th Rifle Corps to join 2nd Belorussian Front but arrived too late to see action before the German surrender. The division was disbanded in July.

== 1st Formation ==
The division first began forming on September 15, 1939, at Yeysk in the North Caucasus Military District, based on a cadre from the 38th Rifle Division. Its order of battle on June 22, 1941, was as follows:

- 875th Rifle Regiment
- 879th Rifle Regiment
- 881st Rifle Regiment
- 423rd Artillery Regiment
- 535th Howitzer Artillery Regiment
- 196th Antitank Battalion
- 167th Antiaircraft Battalion
- 110th Reconnaissance Battalion
- 274th Sapper Battalion
- 284th Signal Battalion
- 84th Medical/Sanitation Battalion
- 119th Motor Transport Battalion

Col. Vitalii Ivanovich Novozhilov was appointed to command on the day the division began forming. Since October 1937 he had led several regiments of the 77th Mountain Rifle Division, an ethnic Azerbaijani unit. From October 1940 until May 1941 he was furthering his military education at the Frunze Academy, and his deputy commander (since March 1940), Col. Vasilii Petrovich Brynzov, served as acting commander. This officer had been arrested in August 1938 during the Great Purge, but was released in December 1939 and placed at the disposal of Far Eastern Front. When Novozhilov returned, Brynzov went back to his deputy command.

== Battle of Smolensk ==
In June 1941 the 158th was en route to Ukraine as part of the 34th Rifle Corps of 19th Army in the Reserve of the Supreme High Command. The Corps also contained the 129th and 171st Rifle Divisions. On the day of the German invasion the division was located in the areas of Cherkasy and Bila Tserkva. 19th Army was under command of Lt. Gen. I. S. Konev, and was soon redirected toward the Vitebsk area, where it arrived in piecemeal fashion over several days. In a lengthy after-action report prepared on July 24 by Konev's chief of staff, Maj. Gen. P. N. Rubtsov, the circumstances of this arrival were described in part:

1. Forces of 25th Rifle Corps were mobilized at the moment they took the field. 34th Rifle Corps forces were only in a state of reinforced combat readiness. The divisions were brought up to only 12,000 men, but were not fully mobilized.
In the field the 12,000-man divisions experienced immense difficulties because of an absence of transport and were unable to maneuver. They could not pick up up required quantities of ammunition, could not carry mortars, etc.
2. The artillery arrived late because [it] had arrived in the Kiev region in the first trains and were the first to occupy firing positions in the former deployment region...

Rubtsov went on to note deficiencies in command and control, especially in the use of radio; lack of rear services and reserves; and insufficient reconnaissance. All these would be reflected in the coming battle.

The 171st was transferred to Southwestern Front, and was replaced in the Corps' order of battle by the 38th Division. The 158th officially entered the fighting forces on July 2, when 19th Army became part of Western Front. In a report to the STAVKA late on July 13, the Front commander, Marshal S. K. Timoshenko, stated that he had designated a line behind the Dniepr and Sot Rivers in the Yartsevo and Smolensk regions as the concentration area for the 34th Corps and the 127th Rifle Division "to avoid feeding 19th Army's concentrating forces into combat in piecemeal fashion." However, on July 25 Colonel Brynzov would report that in fact the division had been deployed in such a fashion, leading to disruption and heavy casualties.

Timoshenko reported on the situation east of Vitebsk on the afternoon of July 16, stating in part that 19th Army had regrouped to prepare to retake that place, and that one rifle regiment and one battalion of the 158th was at Novoselki, with the position of the rest of the division being unknown. By now 19th Army was severely disrupted and would soon be disbanded.

=== Encirclement west of Smolensk ===
The XXXXVII Panzer Corps, consisting of 29th Motorized Division in the lead, followed by 18th Panzer Division (17th Panzer Division was keeping 20th Army tied down at Orsha), had begun advancing from Horki early on July 13. The left wing rifle divisions of that Army were shoved aside and by dusk the town of Krasnyi, 56 km southwest of Smolensk, was in German hands. 16th Army was tasked with the defense of the south approaches to the city, but had only two rifle divisions (46th and 152nd) and the 57th Tank Division under command. Despite serious resistance the 29th Motorized reached the southern outskirts of Smolensk on the evening of July 15; a three-day battle for the city center began the next morning with the 152nd and the 129th Division, which was now under 16th Army. Meanwhile, 17th Panzer was clearing Orsha and pushing 20th Army into an elongated pocket north of the Dniepr west of Smolensk by July 15. In addition, the pocket contained the 129th and 158th, three divisions of 25th Corps, remnants of 5th and 7th Mechanized Corps, and various other formations totalling 20 divisions of several types and states of repair. However, XXXXVII Panzer was extended over 112 km and 18th Panzer, as an example, was attempting to take up blocking positions at Krasnyi with just 12 tanks still operating.

By July 17 Timoshenko had been moved up to the position of commander-in-chief of Western Direction and issued new orders to his armies which condemned the "evacuation mood" he sensed among commanders who wished to surrender Smolensk. He insisted that control of the city be regained "at all cost", with specific reference to Lt. Gen. M. F. Lukin's 16th Army, which would soon have the 158th under direct command. The panzer forces continued the compress the pocket, but lacked sufficient motorized infantry to truly seal it off. In addition, Lukin was removing his forces from the western and southwestern sectors in order to concentrate them for the retaking of Smolensk, and generally redeploying to counter German moves; the 158th was generally found in the east and southeast of the pocket. Elements of the division were assigned to the 129th Rifle Divisional Group on July 18 to take part in an attack into the city's southeastern outskirts, but this made hardly a dent in the defenses of 29th Motorized. Colonel Novozhilov had distinguished himself in defending against German armor near the village of Shiryaevo and would win the Order of the Red Banner in August. He would not receive this for some time, because on July 19 he was severely concussed by shellfire and left on the battlefield. Colonel Brynzov took over command of the division until its disbandment. Novozhilov recovered to find himself behind German lines, and by August 20 he was fighting as the deputy commander of the Pervomaisk partisan detachment near Roslavl. He was able to cross the lines on February 5, 1942, and went on to command the 237th Rifle Division.

Heavy fighting around Smolensk, Krasnyi and the perimeter of the pocket continued through July 23. Lukin reported at 0145 hours on July 21 that a further attack by the 158th and 127th Divisions against the southeastern outskirts had failed "because it was organized too late." He also stated that personnel losses had reached 40 percent. Despite the ongoing German pressure to close the pocket a group of forces under Maj. Gen. K. K. Rokossovskii, which included the late-arriving 38th Division, was holding a gap open near Yartsevo permitting limited resupply and an escape route. On July 22 the 158th and 127th renewed their attack and, although ultimately futile, it struck 29th Motorized hard enough to force the diversion of 17th Panzer to stabilize the situation over the next two days, preventing it from closing the Yartsevo gap. It was reported by Western Front that the 158th had only 100 men to contribute to this attack, without any machine guns. Early on July 24 Lukin reported that the two divisions had a total of about 500 men remaining, were reorganizing near Hill 315 and Lozyn, and were awaiting the arrival of a motorized regiment promised by Rokossovskii.

==== Withdrawal from the pocket ====
Timoshenko had issued an order on July 21 aimed at reorganizing the forces under his command. 13th Army was reforming prior to attacking to recapture Propoisk and Krychaw and its 35th Rifle Corps was to assemble and reform the 158th, 127th and 50th Rifle Divisions once the pocket was broken. In the event this proved impossible. Instead, during the last week of July the pocket continued to shrink as German infantry relieved the panzer forces. Late on July 28 Timoshenko issued what amounted to a personal appeal to his troops as his counteroffensive efforts ran out of steam. 16th Army was specifically directed to attack the newly arrived 137th Infantry Division. He also urged the STAVKA to, among other actions, provide personnel and weapons to refit the 158th, 127th and 38th Divisions. It was becoming clear that if any part of 16th and 20th Armies were to survive, a breakout would be necessary. Since July 1, 16th Army had suffered over 34,000 casualties. In a further report by Lukin in the afternoon of July 29, 34th Corps was stated as being along the Mokhraia Bogdanovka and Oblogino front, from 6 km east to 15 km southeast of Smolensk. Elsewhere, Lukin had stated that his forces were no longer in the city, which Timoshenko took to mean that both it and the pocket were being deliberately abandoned, although the increasing pressure from German infantry was leaving no other option. Timoshenko refused to agree and forbade any withdrawal. Lukin replied on July 31, stating his difficulties in coordinating 34th Corps' operations with those of 20th Army, among other issues. Meanwhile, Timoshenko was hedging his bets with the STAVKA by laying the basis for withdrawal.

By this time the pocket measured roughly 20 km east to west and 28 km north to south. 16th Army's five tattered divisions, including the 158th, were deployed on its southern sector. Fewer than 100,000 Soviet troops remained, and they were nearly out of fuel and ammunition. Lukin stated on August 1 that German forces had penetrated the boundary between the 152nd Division and 34th Corps before reconnoitring toward Dukhovskaya, 15 km east of Smolensk. At 1700 hours the 158th was defending Siniavino Station, Hill 215.2, and Mitino front, after being forced aside by the German penetration. At the same it was fighting to prevent a further penetration between it and the 127th Division. Meanwhile, Rokossovskii's group made attempt after attempt to widen the gap into the pocket by forcing back the 7th Panzer Division. Under the circumstances, Timoshenko's only rational course was to save what he could. Late in the day the STAVKA and Western Front tacitly authorized a breakout, although it was referred to as an "attack" toward Dukhovshchina. At 0900 on August 2 Lukin directed 34th Corps to:

defend the Tiushino, Popova, Zaluzh'e, and Vernebisovo sector with strong security detachments in the Sobshino and Malinovka sector on the western bank of the Dnepr River, 30 kilometers east to 35 kilometers east-southeast of Smolensk, to prevent the enemy from penetrating toward the east and northeast and reliably protect the crossings over the Dnepr River...

He also instructed all commanders that they were "personally responsible to the Motherland and government for taking all of your weapons with you during the withdrawal..." This was to begin on the night of August 2/3 against strongpoints held by elements of 20th Motorized Division.

A gap some 10 km wide extended between 20th Motorised and 17th Panzer, including several crossing sites over the Dniepr in the Ratchino area. 16th Army moved toward this, with the 158th well to the southwest. The escape attempt continued through August 6. At 2000 hours on August 3 Western Front reported that 34th Corps was "moving from Morevo to the Dnepr River crossing at Ratchino and further south." The withdrawing forces began to run a virtual gauntlet through the gap, often under artillery and air strikes, fording the river in places where it was less than 60 cm deep. The operation was largely finished by daybreak on August 5, while a detachment of the division remained east of the Dniepr to provide a rearguard and assist with the crossing of equipment. What remained of 16th Army assembled in the area of Kucherovo, Balakirevo and Tiushino. Lukin reported on the same evening that his divisions were in tatters, moving in various directions after the crossings, and were still engaged in fighting with small German groups; he requested several days for reorganization. However, beginning at 2240 the escaped forces began to be incorporated into the main defensive line. 34th Corps was to relieve two regiments of the 107th Rifle Division some 5–10 km southwest of Dorogobuzh by the evening of August 6 while also securing part of the south bank of the Dniepr.

The STAVKA shuffled its leadership within the Front on the same day with Lukin moved to command 20th Army; he was promised that the remnants of his 16th Army would be incorporated into the 20th before being moved to the rear to reconstituted as the 16th. The next day the 158th officially came under 20th Army. The division was noted as being at Vygor and Kaskovo, between 26 km and 28 km southeast of Solovevo. While there is little agreement on numbers, it seems that as many as 50,000 soldiers of the two Armies managed to escape from the sack. However, the individual divisions had been weakened to 1,000 - 2,000 personnel on average and were considerably weaker in infantry. The 158th had fared even worse than most, and under Army Order No. 0014 of August 8 the 34th Corps was to be disbanded along with the division, with the remaining men and equipment incorporated into the 127th Division. The 158th ceased to exist on August 15, and three days later Colonel Brynzov took command of the 106th Motorized Division. He was wounded and hospitalized on August 28 and never held another field command, although he gained the rank of major general on October 29, 1943. He spent long stays in hospital in 1943 and 1946 before finally being retired on May 4, 1948, although he lived until June 3, 1962.

== 2nd Formation ==
A new 158th was formed from January 15–20, 1942, in the Moscow Defence Zone, based on the 5th Moscow Workers Rifle Division. (NOTE: Not to be confused with the 5th Moscow Rifle Division of National Opolchenie (Frunze District))

=== 5th Moscow Workers Rifle Division ===
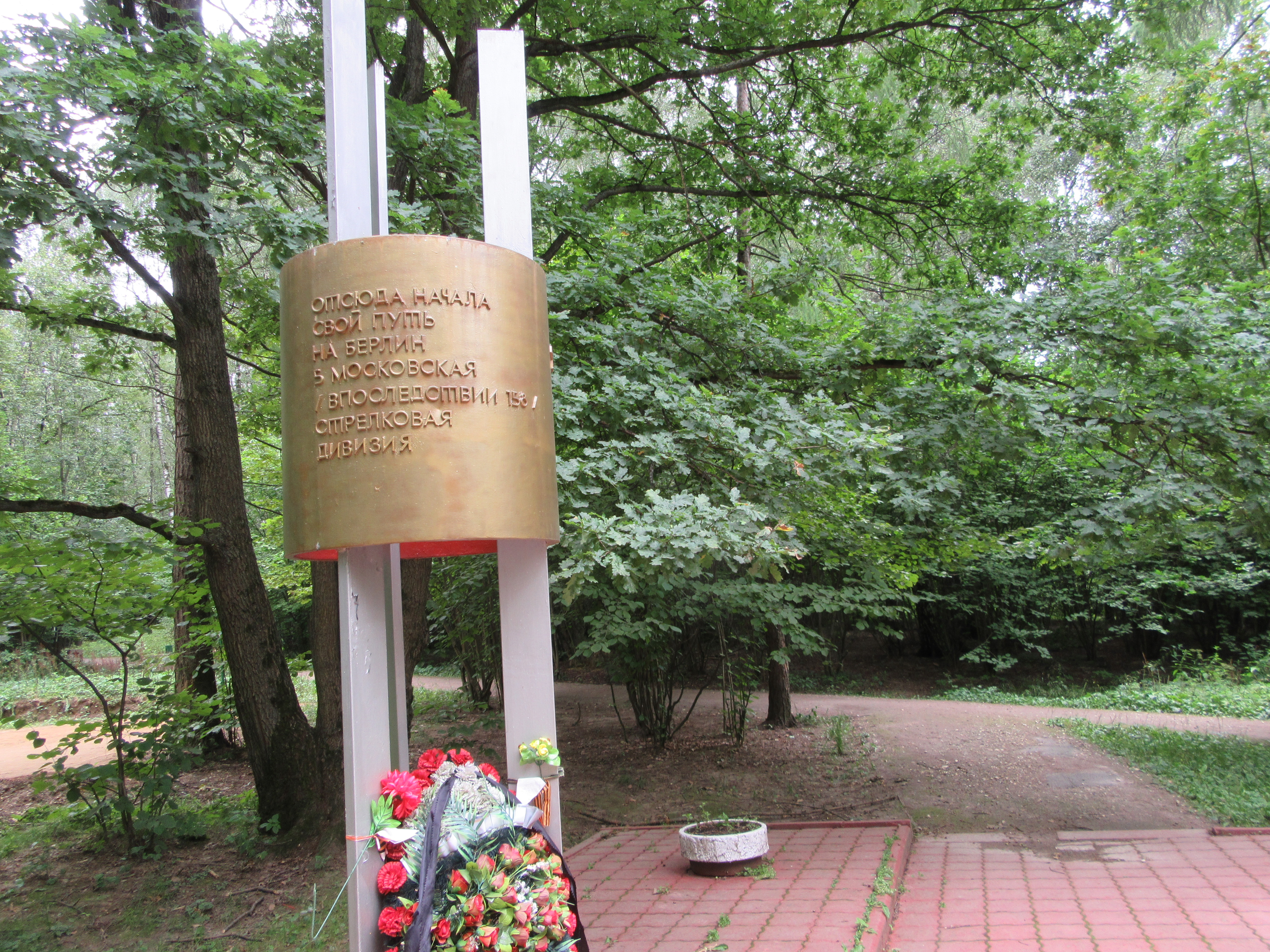
Моnument to the 5th Moscow/158th Division at Troparyovo

The Moscow Fighter (Destruction) Battalions began forming under the NKVD in early July 1941 and by July 12 some 25 had been enlisted. The battalions of 13 city districts were consolidated into three regiments, and on October 17 these came under the 3rd Combat Section under command of NKVD Col. Stepan Efimovich Isaev. This officer had been trained by the Frunze Academy in the previous year and had raised the battalion of the Leningradskii District in July. The three regiments were consolidated into the 2nd Moscow Defense Brigade on October 28, and this in turn was reorganized on November 14 as the 5th Moscow Workers Rifle Division with the following order of battle:

- 7th (Militia) Rifle Regiment
- 8th (Militia) Rifle Regiment
- 9th (Militia) Rifle Regiment
- Unnumbered Artillery Regiment, Antitank Battalion, Antiaircraft Battery, Mortar Battalion, Reconnaissance Company, Sapper Battalion, Signal Battalion, Medical/Sanitation Battalion, Chemical Defense (Anti-gas) Platoon, Auto Transport Company, Divisional Veterinary Hospital

At this time the division had 7,291 personnel, 4,200 of whom were members of the Communist Party or Komsomols. Colonel Isaev remained in command.

== Battle of Moscow ==
Already on October 17–18 the Brigade, along with those units that would later become the 2nd, 3rd, and 4th Moscow Workers Divisions, had been moved outside the city to take up and build positions in the suburbs. Between them they covered the main routes leading to Moscow from the west, specifically the Kyiv and Minsk highways plus the Kaluga, Volokolamsk, Leningrad, and Dmitrov roads. In addition the militiamen carried out reconnaissance on the front lines and combat with German forces that had become bogged down in the late stages of Operation Typhoon.

At the start of December the Moscow Defense Zone was defending the capital with 24th and 60th Armies in the outer defensive belt; the main defensive zone was held by the 3rd, 4th, and 5th Workers Divisions, 332nd Rifle Division, nine artillery regiments, eight artillery battalions, five machine gun battalions, seven flamethrower companies, and three companies of anti-tank dogs. There were also two rifle divisions and several other formations in reserve. Altogether this amounted to about 200,000 men. 5th Moscow was now considered ready for combat, with 11,700 personnel on strength; however, they were armed with only 6,961 rifles, two submachine guns, 271 light and heavy machine guns, and 29 artillery pieces of various calibres. On December 5 the Soviet armies began to go over to the counteroffensive, and the following day the division was officially transferred to Red Army control. As of January 1, 1942, the 5th Moscow Workers was still in the Moscow Defense Zone as the forces of Western Front surged ahead. From January 15–20 the division was reorganized as the new 158th Rifle Division, with the following order of battle:

- 875th Rifle Regiment
- 879th Rifle Regiment (until March 14, 1945)
- 881st Rifle Regiment
- 599th Rifle Regiment (from April 19, 1945)
- 423rd Artillery Regiment
- 323rd Antitank Battalion (later 273rd)
- 455th Antiaircraft Battery (until May 10, 1943)
- 803rd Mortar Battalion (until October 9, 1942)
- 471st Machine Gun Battalion (from January 10, 1942, until May 1, 1943)
- 110th Reconnaissance Company
- 274th Sapper Battalion
- 284th Signal Battalion (later 591st, 1445th Signal Companies)
- 84th Medical/Sanitation Battalion
- 179th Chemical Defense (Anti-gas) Platoon
- 260th Motor Transport Company
- 137th Field Bakery
- 996th Divisional Veterinary Hospital
- 73741st Field Postal Station (later 1804th, 1508th)
- 1603rd Field Office of the State Bank (later 1133rd)

Colonel Isaev remained in command of the division. Under a STAVKA order of January 19 it was to transferred, along with the 155th Rifle Division, via Ostashkov, to the 4th Shock Army in Kalinin Front. However, on February 22 the 158th was reassigned to 22nd Army in the same Front. During the Toropets–Kholm offensive (January 9 - February 6) this Front had deeply outflanked German 9th Army and nearly encircled it from the west, creating the Rzhev salient. Isaev was removed from his post on February 27 and was soon given command of the 234th Rifle Regiment of 179th Rifle Division. On March 7 Maj. Gen. Aleksei Ivanovich Zygin took over the 158th. This officer had previously led the 174th and 186th Rifle Divisions.

== Battles for Rzhev ==
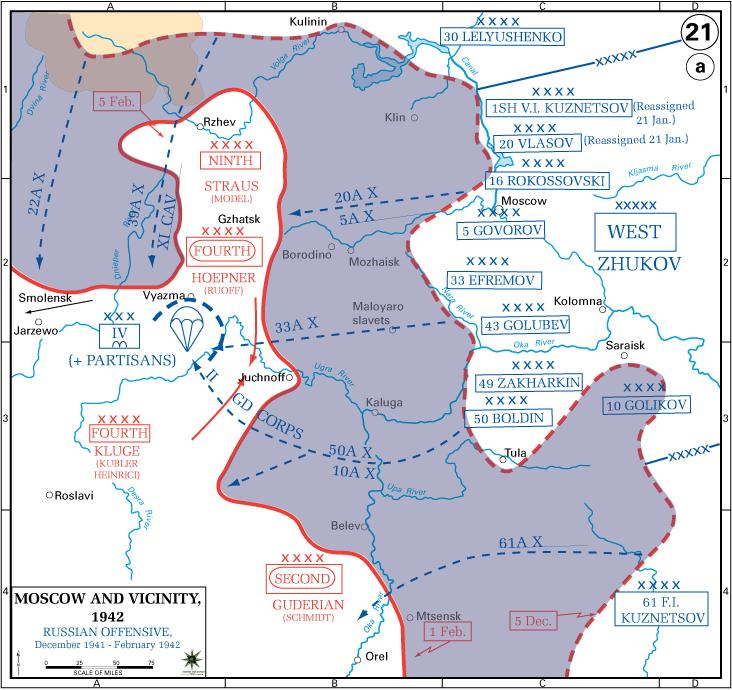
Creation of Rzhev salient. Note advances of 22nd and 39th Armies on the far left.

The second phase of the Rzhev-Vyazma operation had begun at the start of February, when German forces launched counterstrokes in all the main directions of the Soviet operations. The Soviet armies were significantly weakened from casualties and were mostly operating on very tenuous supply lines. All efforts to liberate Vyazma had failed. On February 5, most of Kalinin Front's 29th Army was cut off from 39th Army and encircled. After several attempts to rejoin with the 39th, by mid-month it was decided to regroup to join hands with 22nd Army. By the end of February only 5,200 personnel had managed to escape. Meanwhile, the 22nd was attempting to finally seize Bely as a preliminary to eliminating the German Olenino grouping, but this was unsuccessful.

On March 20 the STAVKA again demanded that Kalinin Front finish off the Olenino grouping with the 22nd, 39th, and 30th Armies. This made no progress due to the general exhaustion of the troops. For example, 22nd Army, in terms of numbers, since the start of the counteroffensive in January had lost its entire complement twice over. Replacements were largely untrained and ammunition was in short supply. In addition, the spring rasputitsa was about to begin. By April 1 the 158th had come under direct command of the Front, and during that month it was transferred to 30th Army. General Zygin left the division on May 18, moving to command of 58th Army about a month later, and would subsequently lead three other armies, including the 39th during Operation Mars, before being killed in action on September 27, 1943. Col. Mikhail Mikhailovich Busarov took over command; this NKVD officer had been serving on the staff of 30th Army and would be promoted to the rank of major general on January 27, 1943.

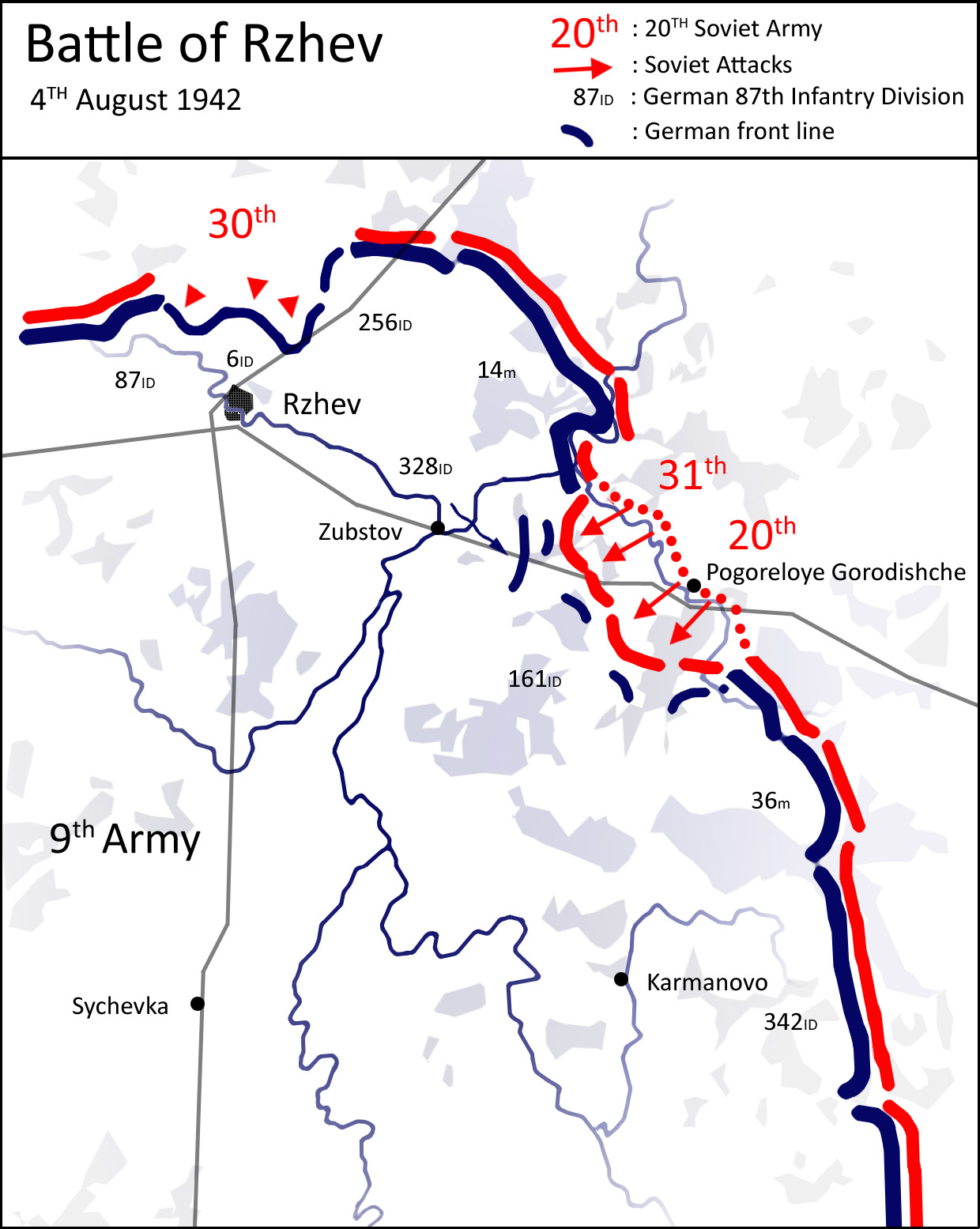
Attack of 30th Army, August 4

The 158th was still in 30th Army during the First Rzhev–Sychyovka Offensive Operation. On August 5 the STAVKA placed Army Gen. G. K. Zhukov in overall command of the operation, which had begun several days earlier. Zhukov proposed to take Rzhev as soon as August 9 through a double envelopment by 30th and 31st Armies. In the event there were no real successes on this sector of the front until August 20, when elements of 30th Army finally cleared the village of Polunino and closed on the eastern outskirts of Rzhev. Over the following days further efforts were made to break into the town, but these were unsuccessful. By the beginning of September the 158th had been moved to 39th Army when 30th Army was reassigned to Western Front.

=== Operation Mars ===
General Zygin was in command of 39th Army in November; the Army was deployed at the northernmost tip of the Rzhev salient, around the village of Molodoi Tud and the small river of the same name. In the planning for Operation Mars the main weight of the attack was to come from Western Front's 20th Army and Kalinin Front's 41st Army to pinch off the main body of 9th Army north of Sychyovka. 39th Army's task was largely diversionary in nature, intended to draw German reserves, but if successful it would reach and cut the Rzhev–Olenino road and railroad.

The 158th, on the left flank of Zygin's shock group, had the 879th and 881st Rifle Regiments on the left bank of the Volga south of the village of Sevastlanovo, while the 875th was on the right bank, adjacent to the 178th Rifle Division. The terrain in the sector was difficult, and the German forces had heavily fortified the south bank of the Molodoi Tud River, but in mitigation they had only one division, the 206th, in the line, although 14th Motorized Division was known to be in reserve. Zygin saw his immediate objective as the town of Urdom, which would encircle the 206th. He planned to attack across the river with the 158th, 135th, and 373rd Rifle Divisions after a one-hour artillery preparation, supported by the 81st and 28th Tank Brigades. The 348th Rifle Division was in reserve.

The artillery fire began at 0900 hours on November 25. Colonel Busarov shared his observation post with Col. K. A. Malygin, commander of the 50 vehicles of the 28th Tanks. To their front the ground sloped gradually over 2 km distance to the forward positions of Busarov's forming-up riflemen, but visibility was hampered by a mix of snow and fog. At about 0930 Busarov began moving forward through the communications trenches to get closer to the upcoming action. The infantry assault went in at 1000, led by sappers carrying timber and logs to place across the frozen Molodoi Tud, where sounds of rifle and mortar fire soon erupted. Less than 30 minutes later Malygin got the word to advance, but as his tanks reached the river with the main force battalions of the 158th men of the lead companies began to reappear on the far bank. It quickly became apparent that the artillery had failed to destroy or suppress many of the German strongpoints, and these men had been forced back by heavy fire. Despite this, Malygin's KV and T-34 tanks, in narrow columns, forced crossings and advanced unsupported, but this failed to move the infantry and he ordered his battalions back to the river; ten vehicles had been lost. Zygin soon learned that the 135th and 373rd had fared equally poorly for much the same reasons. Zygin ordered them to regroup to renew the attack the next day. Meanwhile, the forces on 39th Army's flanks gained some successes and seemed to be making the German position untenable until the arrival of elements of the Panzer-Grenadier-Division Großdeutschland at 1800 partly restored the situation.

Early on the morning of November 26 a slightly stronger artillery preparation was laid on, with much improved observation as the weather cleared, which also allowed air support. This time the tanks and infantry got across as a team, aided by better visibility as German strongpoints were wiped out one by one by artillery and tank fire. By dusk the defenders had been pushed back 2 km to the rear communications road and the village of Bortniki. This would be the first objective for Busarov and Malygin the next morning. The former committed his second echelon regiment late in the afternoon, which forced the 206th Infantry commander, General Hitter, to order the first of a series of withdrawals. The 875th Regiment, previously on a quiet sector, immediately forced a new crossing of the lower Molodoi Tud. Despite this pressure, by nightfall Hitter had stabilized his line but desperately hoped for assistance from Großdeutschland. All that could be spared were a few company teams to reinforce his 301st Grenadier Regiment as the remainder of the panzer grenadiers were needed in the Luchesa valley to the south. Zygin was pleased with his progress and expected to take Urdom the next day.

In the event, despite a renewed artillery preparation in the morning the Soviet advance stalled. Numerous German strongpoints were dug in through a network of villages and a seesaw struggle went on into November 29, although this mainly involved the 135th and 373rd Divisions, as well as the tanks. Urdom was approached but not taken, and Zygin's proposal to commit the 348th was approved. Zhukov emphasized that the drive on Urdom and Olenino must be accelerated. Before dawn on November 30 Zygin conferred with his main subordinates on a new plan to take Urdom, and by dusk it had succeeded, although again this did not directly involve the 158th. It went into the attack again on December 13 alongside the 101st Rifle Brigade, backed by the 46th Mechanized Brigade, at the juncture of the 206th Infantry and 14th Motorized, and made minimal gains but failed to penetrate the defense; German forces withdrew to new lines south of the road from Urdom to Zaitsevo. Although Zhukov managed to drag out the offensive until December 23 it had clearly failed, although the gains of 39th Army were among the few that proved permanent.

==== Rzhev–Vyazma Offensive ====
On February 28, 1943, the OKH finally decided to evacuate the Rzhev salient. 39th Army joined the pursuit on March 2 and the next day Rzhev itself was liberated by 30th Army. The Soviet advance was slow as 9th Army carried out Operation Büffel, and as it was continued General Busarov was moved to the position of chief of staff of 3rd Shock Army on March 10, handing over the 158th to Col. Ivan Semyonovich Bezuglyi on March 14. Busarov would soon attend the Military Academy of the General Staff for a year, and would return to command the 97th Rifle Corps for the last year of the war. Bezuglyi had been promoted to major general in June 1940 while commanding the 201st Airborne Brigade but was demoted to colonel in March 1942 when he was removed from command of 9th Airborne Corps. He later led the 32nd Rifle Division and came to the 158th following a six-week hospital stay in Moscow. He would regain his former rank on September 1.

== Into Western Russia and Belarus ==
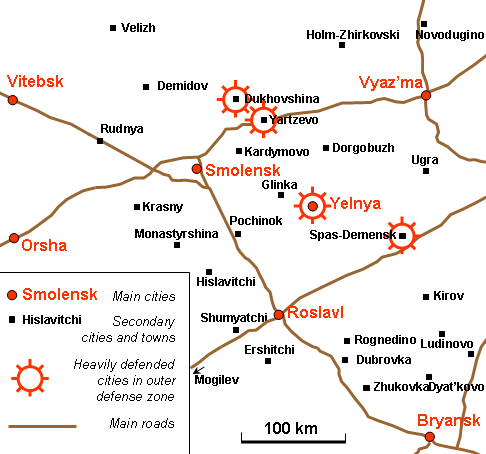
General layout of the Smolensk region during the battle. Note location of Dukhovshchina.

The division remained in much the same positions at the base of the former salient during the operational pause in the spring and early summer of the year. Just prior to the start of the summer offensive the division joined the 84th Rifle Corps, still in 39th Army, along with the 134th and 234th Rifle Divisions. The Corps was commanded by Lt. Gen. S. A. Knyazkov. Operation Suvorov began on August 7, but Kalinin Front's part in it, in the direction of Dukhovshchina, was limited to diversionary activity until August 13. It began its main attack at 0730 hours, attacking XXVII Army Corps 8 km northeast of Dukhovshchina, led by five divisions of 83rd Rifle Corps and 2nd Guards Rifle Corps, backed by two tank brigades, two tank regiments, and two sapper brigades. 43rd Army provided support on the right. XXVII Corps was assigned a 40 km-wide front held by three divisions and a fourth in reserve. All of these were at roughly half their authorized strength, but their Barbarossa-Stellung line consisted of three full lines of trenches sited on heavily wooded high ground.

=== Operation Suvorov ===
The ammunition supply limited the Front commander, Col. Gen. A. I. Yeryomenko, to a 35-minute artillery preparation, which mostly failed to suppress the defenses. In the first hours, 2nd Guards Corps was able to penetrate the first trench line south of Spas-Ugly and overrun a German battalion. But overall the Army's shock groups gained at most 1,500m before being halted by counterattacks. PaK 40 antitank guns destroyed or disabled 45 of the supporting tanks in the first two days of battle. On the second day, heavy air attacks disrupted several of 39th Army's formations, and ground reinforcements began arriving, including a battalion of Nashorn tank destroyers. Finally, the 25th Panzergrenadier Division arrived, which allowed XXVII Corps to stabilize its line. 39th Army gained about 3 km of ground in four days of heavy fighting, at substantial cost, without reaching any objectives. Kalinin Front had taken some 10,000 casualties to this point, but German casualties had also been heavy, especially to the infantry. On August 21 the overall offensive by both Western and Kalinin Fronts was suspended due to losses, supply shortages, and a period of rainy weather. The 18th Panzer Division was transferred to backstop XXVII Corps, but it had only 1,200 infantry and 13 tanks.

Kalinin Front resumed the offensive on August 25. 39th Army was reinforced with the 5th Guards Rifle Corps, but this force was only able to advance 1,000m on a 3 km front in five days of fighting. Yeryomenko was stymied. He wrote in his memoirs:

I was seriously worried that the offensive was fading, and the task was not completed, although we did not lack people. The main cause of our failure was the inability of the artillery to destroy the enemy's strongly fortified positions. The essence of the matter was not in the number of barrels of artillery, but in the number of shells.

Despite this, he was ordered to go on attacking. While Western Front made more substantial gains, Suvorov was again suspended on September 7.

When it resumed on September 14, XXVII Corps was attempting to hold a sector 81 km-wide with five divisions containing just 10,000 troops in total. The Corps commander expected the main thrust to come from east of Dukhovshchina, where he deployed the 25th Panzergrenadiers backed by 1st SS Infantry Brigade. Yeryomenko shook up his command, in part by replacing General Zygin with Lt. Gen. N. E. Berzarin. Having learned of the arrival of 1st SS he briefly shifted his main effort to his 43rd Army to the northwest, where the German lines were even more thinly held, and scored a minor success. After a 20-minute artillery preparation the 39th Army struck near Spas-Ugly with four divisions and smashed a German regiment, breaching the line. By 1000 hours the conditions were favorable for Yeryomenko to commit his mobile forces, which collapsed and routed what remained of 52nd Infantry Division. With Soviet armor roaming in its rear the XXVII Corps was forced to commit the weak 18th Panzer, which simply did not have the strength to deal with the crisis.

On September 15, Berzarin expanded his penetration and mopped up bypassed pockets. After hanging on as long as possible XXVII Corps began to retreat to the Hubertus-I-Stellung to the rear. As front-line resistance evaporated the two Armies of Kalinin Front took up the pursuit. The following morning the 2nd Guards Corps met 84th Corps at Klevtsi, 11 km north of Dukhovshchina, but they failed to trap the 197th Infantry Division. 2nd Guards Corps and the Dremov mobile group now pushed south toward Dukhovshchina against weak rearguards. It was now clear that Hubertus-I was untenable, and the town was evacuated overnight on September 16/17. Smolensk was liberated by units of Western Front on September 25, as Army Group Center fell back to the promised refuge of the Panther Line behind the Dniepr River.

=== Vitebsk Offensive ===
By the beginning of October, 39th Army, still in Kalinin (as of October 20 1st Baltic) Front, was located south of Velizh and was facing elements of VI Army Corps of 3rd Panzer Army. Following the liberation of Smolensk the next obvious objective was the Belarusian city of Vitebsk, which was intended to be taken by October 10. General Berzarin was to conduct the Front's main attack through Rudnya and Lyozna. He chose to deploy his 84th and 5th Guards Corps, backed by a small mobile group, along the Smolensk–Vitebsk highway; the 84th's four divisions (219th, 184th, 158th, and 134th) were backed by the 46th Mechanized Brigade and the 158th was in second echelon. Rudnya was liberated by 5th Guards Corps on September 29 and on October 3 the 134th and 184th Divisions breached the defenses northeast of Mikulino, forcing a German withdrawal on October 6 to new positions north and south of Lyozna. In heavy fighting through October 7–8 the 84th Corps cleared the town with help from the mobile group and the 158th received a battle honor:

LIOZNO... Liberated on 8 October 1943 by Kalinin Front troops during an offensive in the Vitebsk direction... 158th Rifle Division (Major General Bezuglyi, Ivan Semyonovich)... By order of the Supreme High Command, the following were given the name Liozno...

The remaining defenders fell back to a new line 10 km to the west late on October 9, which was reached by the pursuit on the 12th. Given the attrition suffered in the nine previous days the offensive was paused for regrouping. The 39th and 43rd Armies renewed the offensive on October 15 with a series of local attacks. 158th, 32nd, and 184th Divisions struck the 246th Infantry Division (LIII Army Corps) west of Lyozna without any success. Further efforts by both 84th and 5th Guards Corps on October 18 yielded the same lack of results. Yeryomenko stated in a telegram to the STAVKA on October 19:

The Kalinin Front's formations and units have been significantly exhausted during the course of over two or more months of uninterrupted combat. The rifle divisions have 3,500 to 4,500 men each. Such a situation has had a telling effect on the nature and results of the recent combat... Therefore I request that you permit the Kalinin Front's force to pause for 10-12 days...

Nevertheless, the STAVKA would continue to try to crack the Vitebsk defenses. On October 25, Col. Luka Herasymovich Basanets became the 158th's deputy commander, a post he would hold until May 24, 1944.

=== Polotsk-Vitebsk Offensive ===
The 1st and 2nd Baltic Fronts began new operations in early November; the objective for 1st Baltic was first to take Vitebsk and then to advance toward Polotsk. The 39th and 43rd Armies were positioned primarily to the north of the Smolensk–Vitebsk railroad and highway against the defending VI Army Corps. When the assault began on November 8 the 39th Army had the 84th and the 5th Guards Corps deployed abreast, supported by a composite mobile corps made up of three mechanized and tank brigades under command of Colonel Dremov. Despite the attacking forces being eroded to about half their authorized strengths they still enjoyed a fivefold superiority in infantry and an absolute superiority in armor and artillery. On the first day the 184th Division and 124th Rifle Brigade were repulsed by the 246th Infantry Division, but this was intended as a diversion. The next morning the Army's main forces attacked and ripped through the defenses of the 206th Infantry Division just north of the highway.

This joint assault on November 9 by the 39th and 43rd Armies breached the German line along a 10 km-wide front and by evening the lead elements of the attacking force had reached Poddube, just 10 km east of the defense lines around Vitebsk proper. The 206th Infantry's front was a shambles by nightfall and the 14th Infantry Division's right flank was both turned and wide open. While the 43rd Army's advance was largely contained at Poddube on November 11 the 39th managed to continue another 5 km along the highway as far as Karamidy and the banks of the Losonina River, 10 km east of Vitebsk. General Berzarin now committed the Dremov Group to combat which led to a complex battle with elements of the 18th Panzer Division and battlegroups of the 206th and 246th Infantry. By November 17 the German forces were able to restore a fairly continuous front and the Soviet assault expired in exhaustion.

=== Vitebsk (Gorodok) Offensive ===
On December 8 the STAVKA directed the new commander of 1st Baltic Front, Army Gen. I. K. Bagramyan, to go over to the defense so his armies could regroup and refit prior to another offensive to take Vitebsk as well as the town of Haradok to the north. The forces of his Front, including the 158th, were by now seriously under strength from near-continuous fighting since early October. The new offensive on Vitebsk would also involve the 33rd Army of Western Front and would begin on December 19. At the start of the offensive the combined forces of 43rd and 39th Armies struck the defenses of 14th Infantry Division. According to German records eight rifle divisions, one rifle brigade and two tank units participated in the initial assault on a 16 km-wide sector from Borok northeast to Kasenki, south of the Vitebsk–Surazh road. General Berzarin had deployed his 5th Guards and 1st Rifle Corps, soon reinforced with 84th Corps and several separate formations, on the Borok–Goriane sector. Overall the two armies drove the defenders back up to 3 km on an 8 km-wide front by day's end on December 19 and almost reached the Vitebsk–Surazh road. The next day the second echelon divisions were committed to develop the attack; these gained another 2 km in heavy fighting but were still unable to cross the road. The 14th Infantry committed all its reserves and was reinforced with one regiment of the 197th Infantry transferred from the Orsha sector. The battle raged until December 23 by which time the Soviet forces had reached the road on a 10 km sector from Piatiletna to Kasenki.

==== Third Vitebsk Offensive ====
By this time the 2nd Baltic Front was about to liberate Haradok and the German position at Vitebsk was becoming pocketed on three sides. The STAVKA believed that the forces it had assembled were sufficient to pinch off the salient and take the city. Western Front's 33rd Army was heavily reinforced to lead the new effort with the 39th Army's 5th Guards and 84th Corps concentrated on and south of the Smolensk–Vitebsk highway; although the divisions of these Corps had been severely weakened in previous attacks they faced only a single regiment of the 206th Infantry. The assault began on December 23 and 91st Guards was initially deployed in the Corps' reserve. By December 26, 5th Guards Corps had advanced a mere 2–3 km, leading to a caustic telegram from the STAVKA to the 1st Baltic Front, demanding greater progress. Reserves were now committed to the fighting but despite this 39th Army only managed to gain another 1–2 km by December 28 before stalling completely, while 33rd Army soldiered on until January 6, 1944.

General Bezuglyi left the division on January 2 and a week later took over 5th Guards Corps. He would be promoted to the rank of lieutenant general on July 15 and would retire in June 1953. He was briefly replaced by Col. Daniil Sergeevich Kondratenko until February 10 when he stepped aside for Col. Demyan Ilich Goncharov, who had previously served as deputy commander of 360th Rifle Division and chief of staff of 91st Rifle Corps.

The offensive was renewed on January 8. 5th Guards Corps formed 39th Army's shock group on a 6 km-wide between the Smolensk–Vitebsk road and the village of Vaskova, again facing the 206th Infantry Division. 84th Corps was on its right, with the 158th in its second echelon. By now these divisions were at less than 40 percent of authorized strength. Although the German forces were similarly weakened, 5th Guards Corps' attack floundered after an advance of only about 1000m. Although the 33rd and 5th Armies to the south made greater progress, it was at a heavy cost, and the offensive was finally shut down late in the month.

==== Fourth and Fifth Vitebsk Offensive ====
Later in January the 158th, along with its Corps and Army, was transferred to Western Front, which was commanded by Army Gen. V. D. Sokolovskii. The STAVKA now ordered the Front to change the axis of its attacks northward toward Vitebsk itself. Berzarin once again would attack along and south of the Smolensk–Vitebsk road against the 206th Infantry. He chose to configure his Army with 84th Corps in first echelon and 5th Guards Corps in second. The 84th, now led by Maj. Gen. E. V. Dobrovolskii, would continue to guard the sector north from the highway to Poddube with the 262nd Rifle Division while the 158th and 134th Divisions would attack west to Ugliane with 28th Tank Brigade in support and 32nd Rifle Division in second echelon; this objective was just 12 km southeast of the center of Vitebsk. The offensive began with an intense artillery preparation at dawn on February 3, but this failed to silence many German strongpoints, artillery and mortar positions. The 158th and 134th made scarcely a dent on the 206th and they soon fell back to their start lines with heavy losses. While this effort was suspended the 33rd Army had greater success and the offensive continued for five more days, bending but not breaking the defense.

Yet another attempt to take the city was set to begin on February 29. By this time the 158th and 134th were facing the 246th Infantry in the Babinichi area, while the 262nd and the 5th Guards Corps opposed the 206th. The 33rd Army would again carry the main weight; once it took Astrowna most of 39th Army were to attack from the Poddube region. Just as this was to begin the commander of 3rd Panzer Army, Col. Gen. G.-H. Reinhardt, disrupted the entire plan by shortening his defensive line around Vitebsk. The 246th and 206th pulled back to a new line from Avdeevichi on the Dvina south across the Smolensk–Vitebsk road to Shelegova and allowed the creation of reserves. From the perspective of Sokolovskii the entire plan for 39th Army was compromised. The offensive went ahead with mixed results, and early on March 5 the 158th attacked in cooperation with the 334th Rifle Division of the adjacent 43rd Army against the 246th Infantry on a 6 km-wide sector from the Dvina south to Babinichi. This forced a German withdrawal to new lines from Zakharova to Senkova, some 2 km west of Babinchi. However, this marked the culmination of the offensive, as the spring mud began to set in. Western Front had lost 2,650 killed and 9,205 wounded in this latest attack, as well as most of its remaining tanks.

By this time the STAVKA had run out of faith in Sokolovskii. He was removed from his command on April 15, and on April 24 his Front was split into 2nd and 3rd Belorussian Fronts, with 84th Corps and 39th Army moving to become the north flank of the latter.

== Operation Bagration ==
At the outset of the Soviet summer offensive the 84th Corps contained the 158th, 164th, and 262nd Divisions. 3rd Belorussian Front was under command of Col. Gen. I. D. Chernyakhovskii. For the offensive he had, on his right (north) wing, the 39th Army and 5th Army, with the 5th Guards Tank Army in reserve. 39th Army was still largely in the positions east and southeast of Vitebsk that it had won at such cost through the winter. Chernyakhovskii's plan for the first phase of the offensive was to defeat the opposing forces of Army Group Center and reach the Berezina River before developing the advance toward Minsk. This would begin with two attacks: the first from west of Lyozna toward Bahushewsk and Syanno; the second from northeast of Dubrowna along the Minsk highway in the direction of Barysaw. The 5th and 39th would carry out the first of these. Their task was to break the defense on a 18 km-wide sector from Karpovichy to Vysochany, after which Krylov's forces, backed by Oslikovsky's Cavalry-Mechanized Group, would drive on Bahushewsk and encircle the 3rd Panzer Army in cooperation with the left wing of 1st Baltic Front. Following this, 39th Army would reduce and destroy the German forces trapped in Vitebsk. It would launch the attack with five divisions plus reinforcements, but the 158th would initially hold in place.

=== Vitebsk–Orsha Offensive ===
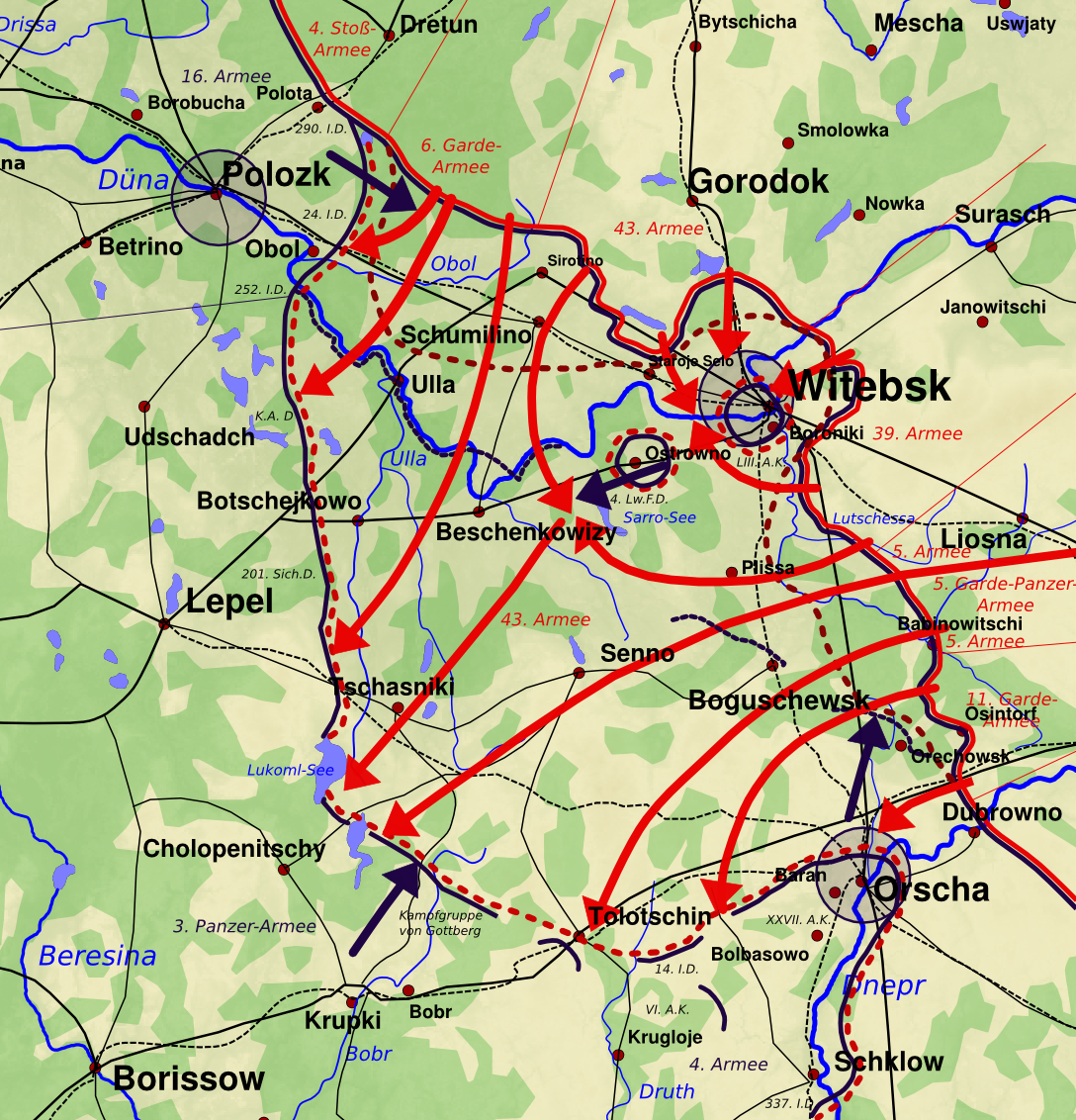
Vitebsk-Orsha Offensive. Note position of 39th Army.

When the offensive began on June 22 the 158th and one rifle regiment of the 262nd were covering a total of 40 km, while two regiments of the latter were concentrated to cooperate with 5th Guards Corps in pinching off the salient by meeting up with 43rd Army's attack from the north. The 164th was in Army reserve. During the first two days the perimeter around Vitebsk was relatively quiet as the 84th Corps and the 92nd Rifle Corps of 43rd Army limited themselves to artillery raids and local attacks intended to hold LIII Corps in place while forces to the north and south punched through the defenses to complete the encirclement. This had been nearly completed by the end of June 23. The next day 5th Guards Corps was well on its way to Astrowna; at 1300 hours the 158th began attacking into the suburbs while the 262nd and 164th advanced as much as 6 km into the 10 km-wide corridor that linked LIII Corps with the rest of 3rd Panzer Army. Late in the day other forces of the two Armies linked up at Gnezdilovichi. Five German divisions were now trapped. The 145th Rifle Division of 92nd Corps broke into the northwest part of the city and began clearing it as LIII Corps desperately moved to reopen its escape route. By 1100 on June 26 it had mopped up the western half while the 158th had done the same in the east. In recognition the 145th was awarded the honorific "Vitebsk" that day, which the 158th would later inherit. For its part, on July 2 the 158th would be awarded the Order of the Red Banner.

== Into the Baltic States ==
Much further fighting would be required to liquidate the encircled German groupings, and this task had been largely allocated to 39th Army. Closer to Vitebsk the 6th Luftwaffe Field Division, 206th Infantry, and two regiments of the 246th Infantry, were tasked with breaking out at any cost. These efforts began on the night of June 26/27, led by the 206th and several tanks, and managed to carve a path, at considerable cost, but this corridor was cut by the 262nd Division and a motorcycle regiment. At noon on June 27 the leadership of LIII Corps accepted an ultimatum to surrender unconditionally. Altogether, since June 23, 39th Army had captured 19,000 German officers and men while a nearly equal number had been killed, plus more than 800 artillery pieces, 56 tanks and assault guns, and much other equipment had been captured or destroyed.

=== The Baltic Gap ===
As this mopping-up operation was going on the 158th, along with its Corps and Army, were transferred to 1st Baltic Front. On July 4 the STAVKA issued a new directive in which 1st Baltic Front was ordered to develop the offensive by launching its main attack in the direction of Švenčionys and Kaunas with the immediate task of capturing a line from Daugavpils to Pabradė by no later than July 10–12. It was then to continue the attack with its main forces on Kaunas as well as toward Panevėžys and Šiauliai. 39th Army was out of contact with organized German forces as it caught up with the remainder of the Front and on this date it was estimated that it would take 4–5 days to commit it into the line. By July 19 it had crossed the eastern border of Lithuania near Švenčionys. During the night of July 20/21 the 158th was relieved along the line from Gavrielishke to Vagine by elements of the newly arrived 13th Guards Rifle Corps. As this relief was taking place the commander of that Corps, Maj. Gen. K. A. Tsalikov, was killed when his Jeep drove over an antitank mine. Two weeks later, as the rate of advance slowed due to logistics and increasing resistance, the 158th was in the vicinity of Jonava, and 39th Army was returned to 3rd Belorussian Front. On August 12 the division was recognized for its role in the liberation of Kaunas with the award of the Order of Suvorov, 2nd Degree.

==== Operation Doppelkopf ====
On the same day the headquarters of 1st Baltic Front started to receive intelligence of the movement of German panzer formations from East Prussia toward central Lithuania. By the following morning these forces had been located near Raseiniai, Užventis, and Telšiai. The rebuilt 3rd Panzer Army had concentrated the XXXX Panzer Corps of three divisions to recapture Šiauliai, while XXXIX Panzer Corps, also with three divisions, moved to retake the Joniškis area. This would be coordinated with an attack along the coast of the Gulf of Riga to restore communications with Army Group North. The Front commander, Army Gen. I. Kh. Bagramyan, took measures to repel the attack. When Operation Doppelkopf began on August 14 the 158th was positioned at Panevėžys. The German strike aimed for the boundary between 39th and 2nd Guards Armies. 24th Guards Rifle Division was pushed aside and soon the 879th Rifle Regiment, along with the 25th Guards Tank Brigade, were encircled near Raseiniai. This force resisted as strongly as possible under very unfavorable circumstances until relieved by other forces of 84th Corps and 5th Guards Tank Army, but the 879th suffered very severe losses. Doppelkopf continued until August 27, and while 3rd Panzer Army scored some local successes, and a corridor was driven through to Riga, its main objectives were not attained. Durint the course of the fighting the 158th, along with 84th Corps, was reassigned to 43rd Army, in 1st Baltic Front.

==== Riga Offensive ====
Colonel Goncharov was hospitalized due to an injury on September 15 and replaced by Col. Vasilii Vlasovich Skvortsov but returned on September 27 and would remain in command until the division was disbanded. By mid-September 43rd Army had advanced northward to the vicinity of Bauska in Latvia. As of the beginning of October the 158th had been shifted to 83rd Rifle Corps under command of 4th Shock Army in the same Front. This Army was straddling the border of Latvia and Lithuania in the area of Žagarė. 4th Shock was not directly involved in the retaking of Riga on October 13 but for their roles in holding off German relief efforts the 875th and 881st Rifle Regiments were awarded the Order of Alexander Nevsky on October 22.

== Reorganization and into Germany ==
Shortly after the battle for Riga the 158th returned to 84th Corps, which by now was also in 4th Shock Army, and in December moved to that Army's 14th Rifle Corps. In January 1945 the division moved again to 84th Corps, now in 6th Guards Army, but in February it rejoined 14th Corps in the reserves of 2nd Baltic Front. On March 14 this Corps was reassigned to the Belorussian-Litovsk ("Lithuania") Military District in order to rebuild its divisions. In the course of this the 145th Rifle Division was disbanded to provide replacements, most of which went to the 158th, receiving its 599th Rifle Regiment to take the place of the largely-destroyed 879th. The 158th also inherited the 145th's "Vitebsk" battle honor and the Order of the Red Banner it had won in the fighting southwest of Riga the previous September. The 599th also held the Order of the Red Banner from the Šiauliai offensive.

As of April 1 the 158th was still in the Belorussian-Litovsk District, but it soon began moving west through Poland with 14th Corps, which was initially assigned to 19th Army, but was soon reassigned to become part of the reserve of 2nd Belorussian Front, along with 40th Guards Rifle Corps, by April 24. This was too late to take part in the Front's offensive operation.

=== Postwar ===
At this time the men and women of the division shared the full title of 158th Rifle, Liozno-Vitebsk, twice Order of the Red Banner, Order of Suvorov Division. (Russian: 158-я стрелковая Лиозненско-Витебская дважды Краснознамённая ордена Суворова дивизия.) Under the terms of STAVKA Order No. 11095, part 6, of May 29 the 158th is listed as one of the divisions that were to be "disbanded in place" in central Germany. It was accordingly disbanded in mid-July. Colonel Goncharov went on to serve on the staff of the commandant of the city of Berlin and in mid-1946 moved to the educational and training establishment of the Soviet Army, where he worked in several positions until he retired in July 1953.
