= 108th Motor Rifle Division =

Motor rifle division of the Soviet military

360th Rifle Division (August 1941 – April 1955) 62nd Rifle Division (April 1955 – May 1957) 108th Motor Rifle Division (May 1957 – 1993)
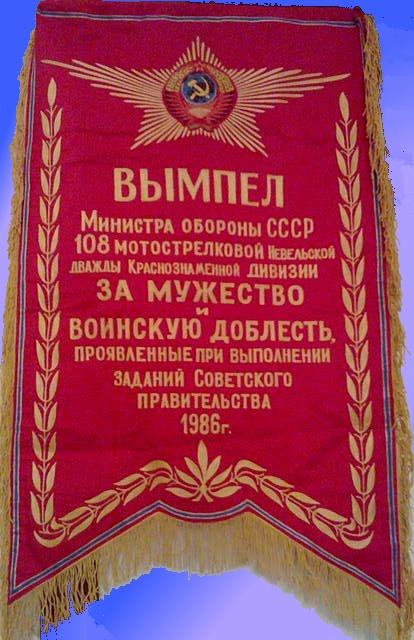
- 108th Motor Rifle Division badge
- Active: 1941–1993
- Disbanded: December 1993
- Country: Soviet Union (1941–1992); Uzbekistan (1992–1993)
- Branch: Soviet Army (1941–1992); Armed Forces of the Republic of Uzbekistan (1992–1993)
- Type: Motorized Rifle Division
- Colors: Red
- Engagements: World War II * Toropets-Kholm Offensive * Battle for Velikiye Luki * Battle of Nevel (1943) * Baltic Offensive * Courland Pocket; Soviet invasion of Afghanistan; Tajikistan Civil War
- Decorations: Order of the Red Banner (2); Pennant of the Ministry of Defence of the USSR "For Courage and Valor"
- Battle honours: Nevel

Commanders
- Notable commanders: Maj. Gen. Viktor Genrikhovich Poznyak; Maj. Gen. Ivan Ivanovich Chinnov; Col. Efim Aleksanrovich Pashchenko

The 108th Nevelskaya Motor Rifle Division, abbreviated as the "108th MRD," was a unit of the Soviet Ground Forces and the Armed Forces of Uzbekistan. It was the successor to the 360th Rifle Division. The division was created in August 1941 by the State Defence Committee and the Volga Military District Commander, Vasily Gerasimenko, in the Volga Military District. The 360th compiled a distinguished record of service during the Great Patriotic War on the northern sector of the Soviet-German front, including the award of a battle honour and the Order of the Red Banner.

== World War II ==
The 360th Rifle Division was formed in August 1941 in Chkalovsk in the Volga Military District. When the division was formed, its basic order of battle was as follows:

- division management
- 1193rd Rifle Regiment
- 1195th Rifle Regiment
- 1197th Rifle Regiment
- 920th Artillery Regiment
- 664th Separate Anti-Aircraft Division
- 419th Separate Motorcycle Reconnaissance Company
- 808th Separate Communications Battalion
- 637th Separate Engineer Battalion
- 435th Separate Chemical Defence Company
- 472nd Separate Delivery Company
- 442nd Separate Medical and Sanitary Battalion
- 221st Field Bakery

By the end of the year, it had been moved via the 60th Reserve Army and the Moscow Military District to the 4th Shock Army in the Northwestern Front, where it was at full strength with 10,000 officers and men assigned. Commanders of Corps and Divisions in the Great Patriotic War, 1941–1945 does not list a commander for the division until 1 January 1942, when Col. Andrei Filippovich Bolotov was named.

=== Toropets-Kholm Offensive ===
On 18 December 1942, the STAVKA of the Supreme High Command issued its Order No. 005868 to the command of Northwestern Front, spelling out the goals and objectives of this operation:

"No later than 26 December 1941 to strike with at least six reinforced divisions from the Ostashkov area in the general direction of Toropets, Velizh and Rudnya, having the task, in cooperation with forces of Kalinin Front, to cut off the enemy's paths of retreat and not allow him to defend along his prepared front lines... Ultimately, pressing the offensive to Rudnya will cut off Smolensk from the west."

In the event that the operation would not begin until 9 January 1942, due to the poor road and rail network. 4th Shock, commanded by Col. Gen. Andrey Yeryomenko, deployed on a front 50 km wide, facing most of the 253rd Infantry Division; with just 10,000, men the German "line" was in fact a string of outposts, although well-fortified since the Germans had occupied this sector since October. The Army also had 790 guns of 76mm calibre or greater for support. At the outset, the 360th was in third echelon, bringing up the rear.

The 4th Shock was to initially advance towards Andreapol. Following a 90-minute artillery preparation, the leading divisions broke through the thin German defences and advanced as much as 15 km. During the coming week, the first echelon divisions surrounded and destroyed a reinforced battalion of the newly arrived 189th Regiment of the 81st Infantry Division and liberated Andreapol, seizing needed supplies. The 360th joined the advance on Toropets, which was taken on 21 January with an even larger hoard of much-needed supplies. On 22 January, the 4th and 3rd Shock Armies were transferred to the Kalinin Front.

On 26 January, Maj. Gen. Ivan Mikhailovich Kuznetsov took over command from Colonel Bolotov. During the rest of January and into February, the division took part in several attempts to break into and liberate Velizh, but these were stymied on its outskirts. On 14 March, General Kuznetsov was in turn replaced by Col. Viktor Genrikhovich Poznyak. Finally, the 4th Shock Army took up defensive lines, where it remained into the summer of 1943.

=== Velikiye Luki and Nevel ===
The division was transferred to the 3rd Shock Army in December 1942, during the Battle for Velikiye Luki, arriving at the front along the Lovat River on the 24th, and immediately helping to drive enemy forces from the village of Alexeykovo and the tactically significant height of point 179.0. By 3 January 1943, the division's 1193rd and 1195th Rifle Regiments were holding a line in front of Alexeykovo and Burtsevo in two echelons, facing the deepest wedge the German forces had driven in attempting to relieve their garrison in the city. However, Soviet intelligence had failed to detect the arrival of the fresh German 205th Infantry Division and a column of tanks from the 11th Panzer Division. On the morning of 4 January, these broke through the 1193rd after an hour of fighting. The breakthrough was contained later that day by the 100th Rifle Brigade and the few tanks of the 45th Tank Brigade. By 12 January, the German advance was stopped, and on the 17th, the city was completely liberated. On 22 February, Colonel Posnyak was promoted to the rank of major general and soon moved to the role of chief of staff of the 43rd Army, being replaced by Col. Ivan Ivanovich Chinnov.

In February, 360th was moved back to 4th Shock Army, and remained in that Army, apart from short assignments to 6th Guards Army and 11th Guards Army, until January 1945. The division's next major action was the Nevel Offensive Operation, which began on 6 October. It was on the rightmost flank of 4th Shock, in 2nd Guards Rifle Corps, adjacent to 28th Rifle Division on the left flank of 3rd Shock Army. The operation began with a reconnaissance in force at 0500 hrs., followed by a ninety-minute artillery preparation at 0840, then a wave of bombing strikes. The assault stepped off at 1000 hrs., and by noon, the 28th Rifle Division had routed the 2nd Luftwaffe Field Division and smashed the right flank of 263rd Infantry Division and was pouring through the gap, which was at the boundary between Army Groups Centre and North. This success eased the way for the 360th, which gained 10 km by the end of the day and about 10 more by 10 October. In the aftermath of this success, the division was given its battle honour:

"NEVEL – ...360th Rifle Division (Col. Chinnov, Ivan Ivanovich)... The troops that participated in the liberation of Nevel, by order of the Supreme Commander-in-Chief of 7 October 1943 and a proclamation of gratitude in Moscow, are given a salute of 12 artillery salvoes of 120 guns."

=== Vitebsk and Polotsk ===
Further fighting later that month made few gains. By 1 November, the division had been transferred to the 83rd Rifle Corps. On 2 November, the 1st Baltic (former Kalinin) Front began a fresh offensive towards Vitebsk, with the 4th Shock Army ordered to attack south towards the latter city. The joint assault with the 3rd Shock Army soon produced a 16 km-wide gap in the defences of the Third Panzer Army, but the 83rd Corps' role was to make local attacks to guard the flank of the 60th Rifle Corps as it exploited to the south. As the situation evolved, the 360th was moved to the 36th Rifle Corps in the 11th Guards Army in December before the new offensive towards Gorodok. After the city was liberated, the division went back to the 83rd Corps in the 4th Shock Army; it would remain in this Corps until the last months of the war. During January – February 1944, the 360th took part in grinding battles west of Vitebsk. By now, in common with the rest of the divisions of 4th Shock, it was down to between 4,500 – 5,000 men. On 15 February, it helped to capture German strongpoints at Gorbachi and Bryli, forcing the defenders back about 2 km to the line of the Vitebsk-Polotsk rail line, but could advance no farther.

In preparation for the Baltic Offensive in July, the 360th was deployed just east of the Panther Line. For its role in the liberation of Polotsk, on 23 July, the division was awarded the Order of the Red Banner. By the beginning of August, it had advanced along the north bank of the Western Dvina River as far as Daugavpils. In early September, General Chinnov was killed in action. Although the 360th was not conducting active operations at this time, the German forces were regularly firing artillery and mortar rounds into its positions, and German snipers were also active. At 18:30 on 6 September, Chinnov was killed by an enemy sniper while conducting a personal reconnaissance of the terrain between his 1195th and 1193rd Rifle Regiments. The adjutant to the commander of the 1193rd was also severely wounded while standing near the general. He was replaced six days later by Col. Efim Aleksandrovich Pashchenko, who remained in command for the duration of the war. By the same date, the division had continued its advance as far as Biržai in Lithuania. In early October, as the Courland Pocket began to be closed off, the division and its Army had reached farther west, to the vicinity of Žagarė.

In January 1945, the 360th was briefly moved to the 42nd Army in the 2nd Baltic Front, still in the 83rd Corps, then in February to the 119th Rifle Corps in the 1st Shock Army of the same Front. In March, the 1st Shock became part of the Kurland Group in the Leningrad Front, and the division ended the war containing the German forces in the Courland Pocket in Lithuania.

== Postwar ==
Until October, the division was posted on the Leningrad Front and the Baltic Military District. During that month, the division was relocated by railway to the Turkestan Military District in the city of Termez. Arriving there at the start of November, the whole division was housed in military camps for combat and political training until the end of the year. In November and December, new units were created. By September–October 1945, the 360th Rifle Division (Military Unit No. 11090) was part of the 119th Rifle Corps with its headquarters at Dushanbe. By May 1949, it had shifted into the 17th Rifle Corps.

In April 1955, the 360th Rifle Division was redesignated the 62nd Rifle Division. In May 1957, the 62nd Rifle Division became the 108th Motor Rifle Division.

Between World War II and late 1979, the division provided security for the Soviet Union along its southern borders. On 19 February 1962, the 333rd Separate Equipment Maintenance and Recovery Battalion and the 646th Separate Missile Battalion were formed. In 1968, the 271st Separate Sapper Battalion became a sapper-engineer unit. On 15 November 1972, the 738th Separate Anti-Tank Artillery Battalion was activated.

== Invasion of Afghanistan ==
In December 1979, the division, as part of the 40th Army, was part of the Soviet Union invasion of Afghanistan. On 13 December 1979, the whole division was brought to full combat preparedness after years of cadre status. On 24 December, the Minister of Defence signed a directive for the entry of Soviet troops into Afghanistan. The 781st Independent Reconnaissance Battalion became the first unit of the Soviet Ground Forces to cross into Afghanistan. At the same time, military transport planes carrying the 103rd Guards Airborne Division also crossed the border. On 27 December, advance units of the 108th MRD entered Kabul to strengthen the protection of military administrative buildings. By mid-January 1980, the invasion of the 40th Army into Afghanistan was largely complete. The divisional headquarters was established at Khair Khana camp to the northwest of Kabul, on the road to Bagram airfield.

From 1980 to 1989, the division carried out tasks to ensure the safety of convoys along the Doshi-Kabul and Kabul-Jalalabad routes, and the protection of key facilities (Bagram airfield, grain elevators, fuel and lubricant supply depots, a power station in Kabul, a dam, and a hydroelectric power station site in Surubi, etc.)

The division's operations in Afghanistan can be divided into four stages:

- December 1979 – February 1980: entered Afghanistan and established bases.
- March 1980 – April 1985: participated in active hostilities, including large-scale operations, and worked to strengthen the armed forces of the Democratic Republic of Afghanistan. The division participated in the Panjsher VII offensive of April–May 1984, and the commander of the Afghan Bureau of the ISI at the time, Brigadier Mohammed Yousaf, says it was likely that Major-General Saratov, commander of the 108th MRD, commanded the operation. During one battle, on 30 April in the Hazara Valley, the 1st Battalion of the 682nd Motor Rifle Regiment was decimated: the losses of Soviet troops were estimated at 60 KIA.
- April 1985 – January 1987: transition from active operations to a role supporting Afghan troops using artillery and demolition units. The division assisted in the development of the armed forces of the DRA and participated in the partial withdrawal of Soviet troops.
- January 1987 – February 1989: assisted the Afghan leadership in carrying out the policy of national reconciliation, and continued the support of Afghan forces.

The stages of the war in Afghanistan were not uniform and differed in terms of the intensity and types of military activities. Thus, the third and fourth stages were characterized by increased concentrations of rebel forces and the creation of numerous military bases across Afghanistan with more active hostilities.

In terms of sheer personnel, the 108th MRD was the largest division in the Soviet Armed Forces during the invasion of Afghanistan. During this period. V.I. Feskov states the division had four motor rifle regiments, the 177th, 180th, and 181st with BTRs and the 682nd with BMPs. Among the other regiments of the division was the 1415th Anti-Aircraft Rocket Regiment. The division was the only one of its kind in the Armed Forces because of its structure and the quantity of its weapons and other military equipment.

For much of this period, the division was misidentified in open Western sources as the "360th Motor Rifle Division," with the assumption that it had reverted to its Second World War designation in 1957. CIA-DIA documents from 1983 show that at the "Secret" level, the division was correctly identified.

On 11 February 1989, the Division acted as rearguard for the 40th Army as it was withdrawn from Afghanistan. The division was then based in Termez.

== Uzbek service ==
In 1992, the division became part of the Armed Forces of the Republic of Uzbekistan. It fought in the Tajikistani Civil War. In 1993, the division was broken up into brigades.

In 1992–1993, the situation in Afghanistan continued to deteriorate, and a Civil war broke out in Tajikistan.

As a result, the leadership of the Republic of Uzbekistan, fulfilling the CSTO Charter, sent units of the 108th MRD and the 15th Separate Special Purpose ("Spetsnaz") Brigade on a joint combat mission with the 201st Motor Rifle Division of the Russian Armed Forces to destroy paramilitary groups of the Tajik opposition and the Afghan Mujahideen on the territory of the Republic of Tajikistan.

In December 1993, by the decree of the President of the Republic of Uzbekistan, in connection with the transition of the structure of the troops to brigade recruitment, the 108th MRD was disbanded, and its units and divisions after re-forming, became part of the 1st Army Corps (1st AK) with the headquarters in Samarkand, some of them were transferred to the Central subordination.

The following re-formation of regiments, individual battalions and divisions of the 108th Motor Rifle Nevel Division took place:

- 180th motor rifle regiment re-formed → 7th motorized rifle brigade (7th msbr or v / h 11506), village Kokayty of Surkhandarya region
- 177th motor rifle regiment re-formed → 3rd msbr (v / h 28803), Navoi
- 181st motor rifle regiment re-formed → 21st msbr (v / h 36691), village Khayrabad of Surkhandarya region
- 285th Tank Regiment → 22nd msbr (v / h 44278), Sherabad, Surkhandarya region
- 1074th Artillery Regiment → 23rd Artillery Brigade (v / h 54831), Angor, Surkhandarya region
- 1415th anti-aircraft Missile Regiment → 193rd Anti-Aircraft Missile Brigade (v / h 25858), Sherabad, Surkhandarya region
- 271st separate engineer-sapper battalion → 80th engineer-sapper brigade (v / h 93866), Angor, Surkhandarya region
- 738th separate anti-tank division → 6th optdn (v / h 62387), Angor, Surkhandarya region
- 333rd separate repair and restoration battalion → 101st orvb (v / h 49976), Sherabad, Surkhandarya region
- 781st hotel reconnaissance battalion → 50th separate reconnaissance and electronic warfare battalion (50th obrREB or v / h 71308), Termez. (disbanded in 2001).

In 2000, as a result of the ongoing reform in the Ministry of Defence of the Republic of Uzbekistan, the South-Western Special Military District was established with its headquarters in Karshi. It currently includes the formations of the former 108th MSD.

=== The situation with the battle flags ===
- The 108th Motorized Rifle Nevelskaya twice Red Banner Division, in the period from the 60s to December 1993, used the Battle Banner of the 360th Rifle Nevelskaya Red Banner Division, on the basis of which it was formed.
- The 682nd Motorized Rifle Uman-Warsaw Red Banner, Order of Kutuzov Regiment of the 108th MSD, in the period from March 1984 to February 1989, as a Battle Banner, used the Battle Banner of the 285th Tank Uman-Warsaw Red Banner, Order of Kutuzov Regiment of the 108th MSD, on the basis of which it was formed.

== Commanders of the 108th Division ==
Incomplete list of commanders of the 108th Motorized Rifle Division:

- Konstantin Kuzmin (December 1979)
- Valery Mironov (1979–1982)
- Griogory Ustavshchikov (1982–1983)
- Viktor Loginov (1983–1984)
- Valery Skoblov (June 1984 – October 1984)
- Vasily Isaev (1984–1986)
- Viktor Barynkin (1986–1988)
- Yuri Klynkin (1988–1989)
