= Rudakov =

Rudakov may refer to:

- Rudakov (volcano), located in the Kuril Islands, Russia
- Rudakov (surname), Russian surname
