= Vladimir Kurasov =

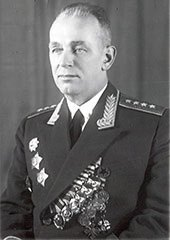
- Kurasov, 1950s
- Native name: Владимир Васильевич Курасов
- Born: July 19 [O.S. July 7] 1897; Saint Petersburg, Russian Empire
- Died: November 30, 1973 (aged 76) Moscow, Soviet Union
- Buried: Novodevichy Cemetery
- Allegiance: Russian Empire; Soviet Union
- Branch: Imperial Russian Army; Red Army (later Soviet Army)
- Service years: 1915–1917; 1918–1973
- Rank: Army General
- Commands: 4th Shock Army; Central Group of Forces; Higher Military Academy (later Military Academy of the General Staff)
- Conflicts: World War I; Russian Civil War; World War II
- Awards: Hero of the Soviet Union; Order of Lenin (4); Order of the Red Banner (4); Order of Suvorov, 1st class (2); Order of Kutuzov, 1st class; Order of the White Lion; Czechoslovak War Cross 1939–1945; Order of Merit of the Republic of Hungary

Vladimir Vasilyevich Kurasov (Russian: Владимир Васильевич Курасов; July 7(19), 1897 – November 30, 1973) was a Soviet military leader, Chief of Staff of Kalinin Front (renamed as 1st Baltic Front) during World War II, reaching service rank of Army General, Hero of the Soviet Union.

== Early life and World War I ==
Kurasov was born on July 19, 1897, in Saint Petersburg, the son of an office worker. He graduated from an eight-year technical school and became a factory worker before being drafted into the Imperial Russian Army in 1915 during World War I. In 1916 he graduated from Telavi School of Praporshchiks and was sent to the front. Kurasov served on the Western Front as a platoon commander, and reached the rank of podporuchik by time the Imperial Army disintegrated.

== Civil War and the interwar period ==
Since 1918 joined the Red Army. During the Russian Civil War he commanded a company and a detachment of sea-mans. Took the defense of Petrograd against the troops of Northwestern Front White Army headed by General Nikolai Yudenich in 1919.

In 1921 he graduated from the Military Pedagogical Institute (which became the Lenin Military-Political Academy). In 1921–1929, he commanded a training company in the Petrograd Commanding course, then was an instructor of tactics at Oranienbaum commanding course, in the third Joint International course, the Leningrad Infantry School. Became the member of Soviet Communist Party since 1928.

In 1932 he graduated from the Mikhail Frunze Military Academy. Since 1932, he served in the headquarters of the Belorussian Military District. Since 1935 as chief of staff of 16th Rifle Corps.

In 1936–1938, he was the students of first session of General Staff Academy, and retained in the academy as a senior instructor of tactics. Since 1940, was Head of department, lately was the Deputy Chief of Operational Department of the Soviet General Staff.

== Great Patriotic War ==
In the early months of the Great Patriotic War, Colonel Kurasov worked at the General Staff. He was promoted to Major General on October 28, 1941. On December 25, 1941, he was appointed Chief of Staff of 4th Shock Army (at the same time, Colonel General Yeremenko was appointed as the Army Commander) belonging to Northwestern Front and transferred to the Kalinin Front on January 22, 1942. During the Toropets–Kholm Offensive in January–February 1942, the Army troops moved nearly 300 kilometers in less than a month, an unprecedented result for the entire Soviet offensive phase of the Battle of Moscow. Since March 1942, Kurasov was appointed as Commanding General of the 4th Shock Army, which was at a relatively quiet sector of the Kalinin Front. Kurasov was promoted to the rank of Lieutenant General on May 21, 1942.

From April 1943, Kurasov became Chief of Staff of Kalinin Front (on October 12, 1943, renamed as the 1st Baltic Front). He played a prominent role in the development and implementation of Smolensk, Nevel, Gorodok operations in 1943. In the course of the Belarusian strategic operation in 1944 troops of 1st Baltic Front brilliantly conducted the Vitebsk-Orsha and Polotsk frontline operations. He was promoted to Colonel General on June 28, 1944. During the fall of 1944 again he again reportedly demonstrated excellent leadership in the Baltic Offensive in the direction of Riga and Memel.

Beginning in January 1945 the Front's troops participated in the East Prussian Offensive, as well as an independently conducted front-line operation to eliminate the German Memel bridgehead and liberate the city of Memel (Klaipėda). In February 1945, due to reduced length of the war front, 1st Baltic Front was abolished and re-formed as the Samland Group, belonging to 3rd Belorussian Front. Kurasov was appointed chief of staff of the group. In April 1945, troops of the group began the Samland operation, which defeated the Germans on the Samland Peninsula, in conjunction with the Baltic Fleet landing troops on the Vistula Spit.

== Postwar years ==
In June 1945, Kurasov was appointed as Chief of Staff of the Soviet Military Administration in Germany, then as Deputy Chief of the Central Group of Forces in Austria. In 1946–1949, he served as Commander-in-Chief of Central Group of Forces in Austria. He was promoted to Army General on 12 November 1948.

In the years 1949–1956 Kurasov was the Chief of General Staff Military Academy. Since 1956 Kurasov was Deputy Chief of General Staff, charged with Military Scientific Research, and concurrently Head of the Military Science Department of the General Staff. In 1961, Kurasov was again appointed as Chief of General Staff Military Academy, became professor in 1963. Beginning in 1963, Kurasov was the representative of the Commander-in-Chief of the Warsaw Pact unified command to the People's Army of the German Democratic Republic.

In April 1968 Kurasov was appointed military inspector-adviser in the General Inspectors Group of the Soviet Ministry of Defense (a position held by senior generals on semi-retirement). He died on November 30, 1973, in Moscow and was buried in the Novodevichy cemetery.

== Awards ==
Hero of the Soviet Union, Decree of the Presidium of the Supreme Soviet on May 7, 1965, for his "able leadership of troops, the personal courage in the struggle against the Nazi invaders, and to mark the 20 anniversary of Victory in the Great Patriotic War "

- 4 Order of Lenin
- 4 Order of the Red Banner
- 2 first class Order of Suvorov
- First class Order of Kutuzov

== Sources ==
- The Soviet Military Encyclopedia in 8 volumes - T. 4. - M., 1977. - S. 530.
- The Great Patriotic War 1941–1945: Encyclopedia - M., 1985. - S. 390.
- Kurasov, V.V. Heroes of the Soviet Union: A Short Biographical Dictionary, Prev. Ed. Bar JH Shkadov. - Moscow: Military Publishing, 1987. - T. 1 / Abayev - Lubich. - S. 823. - 911 sec. - 100 000. - ISBN UTS., Reg. Number in the RCP 87-95382
