= 334th Division =

334th Division may refer to:

- 334th Infantry Division, Wehrmacht, Germany
- 334th Rifle Division, Soviet Union

== See also ==
- List of military divisions by number
