= 332nd Rifle Division =

332nd Rifle Division (August 20, 1941 – 1946)
- Active: 1941–1946
- Country: Soviet Union
- Branch: Red Army
- Type: Infantry
- Size: Division
- Engagements: Battle of Moscow; Toropets-Kholm Offensive; Battle of Smolensk (1943); Battle of Nevel (1943); Baltic Offensive; Riga Offensive; Battle of Memel; Courland Pocket
- Decorations: Order of Suvorov 2nd class
- Battle honours: Ivanovo; Polotsk

Commanders
- Notable commanders: Col. Sergei Alekseevich Knyazkov; Lt. Col. Tikhon Nikolaievich Nazarenko; Maj. Gen. Tikhon Fyodorovich Yegoshin; Col. Ivan Ivanovich Savchenko; Col. Sergei Sergeiivich Ivanov

The 332nd Rifle Division was formed in August, 1941, as a standard Red Army rifle division, based on a militia division that had started forming about two weeks earlier; as a result it was known throughout the war as a "volunteer" division and carried the name "Ivanovo" after its place of formation. It served in the Battle of Moscow and during the winter counteroffensive was assigned to 4th Shock Army, where it would remain, apart from one brief reassignment, until the beginning of 1945, a remarkably long time under a single army's command. During this offensive it helped carve out Toropets Salient, where it would remain until late in 1943 when it made a limited breakthrough to the west, with its army, in the area of Nevel. Throughout this period it shared a similar combat path with 334th Rifle Division. Near the start of the 1944 summer offensive 332nd was given credit for its role in the liberation of Polotsk and got its name as an honorific. The unit continued to give very creditable service for the duration of the war, distinguishing itself in the fighting through the Baltic states, and completing its combat path there. It continued to serve briefly into the postwar period.

== Formation ==
The division began forming as the Ivanovo Militia Division on August 8, 1941, in the city of that name in the Moscow Military District. On August 20 it was re-designated as a regular army unit, but it retained the honorific title "Ivanovo, in the name of M.V. Frunze". Its primary order of battle was as follows:

- 1115th Rifle Regiment
- 1117th Rifle Regiment
- 1119th Rifle Regiment
- 891st Artillery Regiment
- 268th Antitank Battalion

Since the militia division was supposed to include both a self-propelled artillery and a tank company, it's possible it inherited some non-standard weaponry. The division included some 2,700 Communist Party members and Komsomols, giving it a good cadre of determined, if not trained, personnel. These men were also noted at the time as being 100% Russian nationals. On August 28 Colonel Sergei Alekseevich Knyazkov was appointed to command the division, a position he would hold until April 8, 1942. Like the 331st Rifle Division, elements of 332nd took part in the famous November 7 October Revolution anniversary parade on Red Square in Moscow.

== Combat service ==
At the beginning of December, 332nd was in the main defensive zone of the Moscow Defense Zone before being reassigned to 10th Army in the Western Front later that month. Later that month it was moved north by rail and assigned to the newly formed 4th Shock Army in Northwestern Front. When 4th Shock attacked in January 1942, the division was noted as being at full strength for the tables of organization, but attacking in winter with marginal supplies, artillery and armor support soon changed that. The German forces in this sector were in even more dire straits, and 332nd helped 4th Shock, and its running mate, 3rd Shock Army, drive deep into the left flank of Army Group Center, liberating Toropets and advancing almost to Velikiye Luki before finally running out of steam. 4th Shock would remain in this general area, just north of Velizh, until November, 1943, in Kalinin Front. Lt. Col. Tikhon Nikolaievich Nazarenko took command of the division on April 9, and would remain in this post, without promotion, until December 2, 1943. Had Operation Mars in November 1942, fared better, 332nd would likely have taken part in an operation code-named either Jupiter or Neptune to destroy all of Army Group Center east of Smolensk.

On October 1, 1943, the division was in 92nd Rifle Corps in 4th Shock Army. Following the liberation of Smolensk on September 25, the commander of Kalinin Front, Gen. A.I. Yeryomenko, planned a renewed drive toward Vitebsk, with a supporting operation toward Nevel, primarily by 3rd Shock with the support of 4th Shock. 3rd Shock gained success east of Nevel that was surprising to both sides on October 6. After a 90-minute artillery preparation with airstrikes, the German 2nd Luftwaffe Field Division, on the northernmost flank of Army Group Center, was routed; 263rd Infantry Division of Army Group North was also badly damaged and 3rd Shock Army poured into the gap. By October 10, Nevel had been liberated. Meanwhile, 4th Shock made significantly less progress towards Vitebsk. 92nd Rifle Corps, with 332nd and 358th Rifle Divisions, a rifle brigade, a tank battalion, and at least four penal companies, directed towards Velizh, made very little progress in this direction before the offensive was shut down. Later in October the Kalinin Front was renamed as the Baltic Front, and 10 days later as 1st Baltic Front.

Late that month the division was transferred, with its corps, to 43rd Army, as Yeryomenko prepared for another offensive on the axis Gorodok - Vitebsk. The task of 92nd Corps was to protect the army's right flank to the boundary of 4th Shock Army, as the rest of the army attacked to the west. The offensive began on November 8, and although it made a few tactical penetrations of the German lines and gained ground to within 10 km east of Vitebsk by November 17, it stalled there. On December 3, Lt. Col. Nazarenko handed his command to Col. Tikhon Fyodorovich Yegoshin, who would be promoted to Major General on July 29, 1944. Not long afterwards, 332nd was transferred back to 4th Shock, now in 91st Rifle Corps, where it remained briefly until transferred to 60th Rifle Corps in February 1944, then to 83rd Rifle Corps before the summer offensive.

At the start of the Baltic Campaign in early July 1944, 332nd was holding a sector of the Drissa River, facing the German Panther Line defenses about 25 km northeast of Polotsk. On July 4, the division was recognized for its role in liberating the city of Polotsk, and was given that name as an honorific:

"POLOTSK" - ...332nd Rifle Division (Colonel Yegoshin, Tikhon Fyodorovich)... The troops who participated in the liberation of Polotsk, by the order of the Supreme High Command of 4 July 1944 and a commendation in Moscow are given a salute of 20 artillery salvoes from 224 guns.

By the end of the month 332nd had reached the vicinity of Daugavpils, which was liberated on the 27th.

On August 1, the division's commander, Major-General Yegoshin, who had been promoted three days before, died of wounds received from enemy shellfire. On that date the division was conducting an assault crossing of the Western Dvina River when German forces launched a counterattack against 1119th Rifle Regiment, which cost the regiment seven men killed and 27 wounded. Yegoshin was mortally wounded at 1330 hrs. while directing the defense from the midst of his deployed regiment. He was replaced by Col. Ivan Ivanovich Savchenko.

By mid-September the formations of 4th Shock had advanced as far west as Birzhai, in northern Lithuania, as the Riga Offensive was beginning. Three weeks later a further advance had brought it to the Zhagare area, and while the Courland Pocket was being formed, the 332nd, with its army, was taking part in the Battle of Memel and cutting off Army Group North for good. On October 22 the division was recognized for its role in the liberation of Riga with the award of the Order of Suvorov. On November 24, Col. Sergei Sergeiivich Ivanov took command of the 332nd, which he would hold for the duration of the war.

== Operations in 1945 ==
In January 1945, the 332nd finally left 4th Shock, and was reassigned to 6th Guards Army, still in 1st Baltic Front. In 1945 the Soviet commands in the southern Baltic States were in constant flux, as both the assault on Königsberg and the reduction or containment of the Courland Pocket were attempted simultaneously. In March the division was moved to 42nd Army, facing the Courland group. In the last month of the war the division was in 23rd Guards Rifle Corps, in 67th Army of Leningrad Front on the Gulf of Riga.

== Postwar ==
By the conclusion of hostilities, the division had been awarded the full title of 332nd Rifle, Volunteer, Ivanovo-Polotsk, Order of Suvorov, Division, in the name of M.V. Frunze (Russian: 332-я стрелковая Добровольческая Иваново-Полоцкая ордена Суворова дивизия имени М. В. Фрунзе). The division transferred to the 22nd Guards Rifle Corps, which became part of the 6th Guards Army of the Baltic Military District in the summer of 1945. The division was based at Telšiai. The division was disbanded there in 1946.
