= Rudakov (surname) =

Rudakov (Russian: Рудаков) is a Russian masculine surname, its feminine counterpart is Rudakova. Notable people with the surname include:

- Aleksandr Rudakov (naval officer), Russian naval officer
- Aleksandr Rudakov (Party figure)
- Andrei Rudakov (born 1961), Russian football player
- Anton Rudakov (born 1989), Russian football defender
- Ekaterina Rudakova (born 1984), Belarusian cross-country skier
- Fedor Rudakov (born 1994), Russian Paralympic athlete
- Igor Rudakov (born 1934), Russian rower
- Larisa Rudakova (born 1963), Russian soprano singer
- Mikhail Rudakov (1905–1979), Soviet military leader
- Paul Roudakoff (1907–1993), American military officer
- Valeriy Rudakov (born 1955), Ukrainian football player and coach
- Vera Rudakova (born 1992), Russian hurdler
- Yevhen Rudakov (1942–2011), Ukrainian football goalkeeper
  - Yevhen Rudakov club, an unofficial list of Soviet football goalkeepers that have achieved 100 or more clean sheets
