= 334th Rifle Division =

334th Rifle Division (August 1941 – November 1945)
- Maj. Gen. Nikolai Mikhailovich Mishchenko
- Active: 1941–1945
- Country: Soviet Union
- Branch: Red Army
- Type: Infantry
- Size: Division
- Engagements: Battle of Moscow; Toropets-Kholm Offensive; Battle of Smolensk (1943); Dukhovshchina–Demidov Offensive; Operation Bagration; Baltic Offensive; Riga Offensive; Vistula-Oder Offensive; Battle of Königsberg
- Decorations: Order of Suvorov 2nd class
- Battle honours: Vitebsk

Commanders
- Notable commanders: Maj. Gen. Nikolai Mikhailovich Mishchenko; Col. Vasilii Tikhonovich Gnedin; Col. Nikolai Ivanovich Krasnov; Guards Col. Yevgenii Yakovlevich Birstein

The 334th Rifle Division was formed in August 1941, as a standard Red Army rifle division in the Volga Military District. For most of the war it followed a very similar combat path to that of the 332nd Rifle Division, sometimes serving on adjacent sectors. It fought in the Battle of Moscow and during the winter counteroffensive was assigned to 4th Shock Army, where it would remain until November 1943. During this offensive it helped carve out the Toropets Salient, where it would remain until the autumn of 1943 when it helped to liberate Velizh and began advancing westward again. In the first days of the 1944 summer offensive the 334th shared credit with several other units in the liberation of Vitebsk and was awarded that name as an honorific. The unit advanced into East Prussia in January 1945, distinguishing itself in the siege of the heavily-fortified city of Königsberg and the clearing of the Baltic coast. It continued to serve briefly into the postwar period.

== Formation ==
The division began forming at Kazan in the Volga Military District in August 1941. Its order of battle was as follows:

- 1122nd Rifle Regiment
- 1124th Rifle Regiment
- 1126th Rifle Regiment
- 908th Artillery Regiment
- 477th Sapper Battalion
- 407th Reconnaissance Company
- 280th Antitank Battalion
- 796th Signal Battalion

On September 16 Colonel N.M. Mishchenko was appointed to command the division, a position he would hold until May 9, 1944, a remarkably long term of service in the early part of the war. Mishchenko was promoted to major general in May 1942. His division was moved to Gorkii in the Moscow Military District in late October to complete its training and equipping, and variously assigned to several reserve armies that were forming in the Moscow District at that time.

== Combat service ==
In December the 334th was moved north by rail and assigned to the newly formed 4th Shock Army in Northwestern Front. When 4th Shock attacked in January 1942, the division reported a strength of 12,000 officers and men armed with 167 mortars, 14 HMGs, 347 LMGs, and 80 antitank rifles. During training, each rifle regiment had organized "assault" submachine-gun companies from Communist Party members and Komsomols – younger men with high morale, if not more training and experience. The German forces in this sector were badly overextended and under-supplied, and the 334th helped 4th Shock, and its running mate, 3rd Shock Army, drive deep into the left flank of Army Group Center, liberating Toropets and advancing almost to Velikiye Luki before finally running out of steam. By February - March 1942, while fighting north of Velizh, the division had collected enough trophy German 105mm light howitzers and ammunition to form a battery of these guns in the 908th Artillery Regiment. 4th Shock would remain in this general area, just north and west of Velizh, until November 1943, in Kalinin Front. Had Operation Mars in November 1942, fared better, the 334th would likely have taken part in an operation code-named either Jupiter or Neptune to destroy all of Army Group Center east of Smolensk.

During the Dukhovshchina–Demidov Offensive from September 20 to October 2, 1943, Kalinin Front would finally liberate Smolensk, and 4th Shock took Velizh, advancing nearly to Surazh by the end of the offensive. At this time the 334th was a separate division in the Army, not part of any corps. Before this operation ended the Front commander, Gen. Andrey Yeryomenko, began planning two additional thrusts, one by 3rd Shock Army and most of 4th Shock in the direction of Nevel, and another by the rest of his forces towards Vitebsk, which was seen by both sides as the gateway to the Baltic states. The assault on Nevel, beginning on October 6, was a surprising success, while the attack towards Vitebsk, which began three days earlier, was the first of many frustrating failures along this axis over the next seven months. The 334th was deployed in a support role on the right flank of 92nd Rifle Corps, facing the German 87th Infantry Division. After heavy fighting over nine days, the German forces were pulled back to new lines in the Gorodok region, and after following up, the 4th Shock units had to pause for their own regrouping and replenishment. On October 16 an order from STAVKA shut this offensive down.

In late November, the division was transferred to the 43rd Army in the 1st Baltic Front (former Kalinin Front), and it remained under those commands until August 1944. A new offensive towards Vitebsk began on December 23. By this time the 334th was in 92nd Rifle Corps, alongside the 332nd. On the second day, the division, along with the 358th of the same Corps, succeeded in biting a chunk out of German 14th Infantry Division's defenses north of the Surazh - Vitebsk road. This pressure helped to compel the Germans to withdraw their LIII Corps to new defenses even closer to the city. Despite these marginal successes, and others, the offensive was shut down on January 5, 1944, due to excessive losses. During that month the 334th was reassigned to 60th Rifle Corps, in the same Army, and it would remain in this Corps for the duration, while being reassigned to several other armies.

In early March yet another attempt was made to advance against the German positions north and east of Vitebsk. The German VI Army Corps withdrew once again to shorter lines, followed by the 334th and its Corps, which ran up against 4th German Air Force Field Division in the vicinity of Losvida and Savchenki, only to suffer a sharp rebuff. By March 5 the offensive was once again shut down.

At the start of Operation Bagration, on June 22, the 334th and its Corps were part of the assault forces of 43rd Army. Following a very heavy artillery barrage and air attacks, 60 Corps had passed through both the first and second German defense lines and reached the Obol River. By the evening of June 23, 60th Corps was pressing remnants of German Corps Detachment D south towards the Dvina River west of Vitebsk. On the following day several bridgeheads were taken, and crossing operations began on both sides of Beshenkovichi. Overnight on June 25/26 60th Corps met the 19th Guards Rifle Division of 39th Army at Gnezdilovichi, closing the ring, and through the day forces of both armies cleared Vitebsk. On the same date the division was recognized for its role in liberating the city, towards which the Red Army had struggled for so many months, and was given that name as an honorific:

"VITEBSK" - ...334th Rifle Division (Colonel Gnedin, Vasilii Tikhonovich)... The troops who participated in the liberation of Vitebsk, by the order of the Supreme High Command of 26 June 1944 and a commendation in Moscow are given a salute of 20 artillery salvoes from 224 guns.

Following this victory the division joined in the pursuit of the broken remnants of Army Group Center, and by the second week in July had nearly reached the Lithuanian border just east of Švenčionys. Over the following months the advance slowed, and by August 1 the division found itself in the vicinity of Kupiškis, moving in the direction of Riga. Two weeks later it had reached Pasvalys, and shortly thereafter was transferred, along with the rest of 60 Corps, to 51st Army. By mid-September the 334th had crossed into Latvia at Eleja, but made little further progress over the next six weeks. In the last months of the year the division was briefly reassigned back to 4th Shock Army, then to 61st Army.

== Operations in 1945 ==
On January 4, 1945, Guards Colonel E.Ya. Birstein was given command of the division, which he would hold for the duration. At about the same time the 334th made its final transfer, to 2nd Guards Army in 3rd Belorussian Front, still in 60th Rifle Corps. Under these commands it took part in the Vistula-Oder Offensive. When the offensive was launched, 60th Rifle Corps was assigned to defend along a broad front to the north of Goldap while the remainder of 2nd Guards Army followed 28th Army's breakthrough of the German lines; the 334th and its Corps followed in second echelon. In the second half of March, in the lead-up to the assault on Königsberg, 60th Corps advanced along a route from Preussisch Eylau to Domnau, Tapiau, and Granz. On April 5 the division was awarded the Order of Suvorov, 2nd Class, in recognition of its role in the capture of Bartenstein and Landsberg. During the assault on Königsberg on April 7, the division assisted in forcing the Tierenberger River and reached the area north of Norgau. Once the city fell, the 334th took part in the clearing of the Samland Peninsula beginning on April 13.

== Postwar ==
When the fighting stopped, the men and women of the division had earned the full title of 334th Rifle, Vitebsk, Order of Suvorov Division (Russian: 334-я стрелковая Витебская ордена Суворова дивизия), and 15 men had been named Heroes of the Soviet Union. The division was withdrawn to the Smolensk Military District with the 60th Rifle Corps, where it was disbanded in November 1945 along with the rest of the corps.
