= 358th Rifle Division =

358th Rifle Division (August 1941 – 1945)
- Active: 1941–1945
- Country: Soviet Union
- Branch: Red Army
- Type: Division
- Role: Infantry
- Engagements: Battle of Moscow; Toropets–Kholm Offensive; Vyborg–Petrozavodsk Offensive; Vistula-Oder Offensive; East Prussian Offensive; Battle of Königsberg; Samland Offensive; Soviet invasion of Manchuria
- Decorations: Order of the Red Banner; Order of Suvorov
- Battle honours: Leningrad; Khingan

Commanders
- Notable commanders: Maj. Gen. Zakhar Nikitovich Usachyov; Col. Semyon Aleksandrovich Vrublevskii; Col. Nikifor Yegorovich Lubyagin; Maj. Gen. Pavel Filippovich Zaretskii

The 358th Rifle Division formed in August 1941, as a standard Red Army rifle division, at Buguruslan. It first saw action in January 1942, taking part in the offensive northwest of Moscow which carved out the salient around Toropets deep in the rear of Army Group Center. The division remained on this general sector of the front, nearly the whole time in 4th Shock Army, until March 1944, when it was withdrawn for rebuilding. It was then assigned to 21st Army north of Leningrad where it participated in the offensive that drove Finland out of the war from June into August, and remained on this front until December. It was then reassigned to the 39th Army, under which it fought in East Prussia until April 1945. During that month the entire 39th Army began moving to the Far East, where it took part in the Soviet invasion of Manchuria in August, where the 358th won its second battle honor, capping a distinguished record of service.

== Formation ==
The division began forming in August 1941 in the Volga Military District at Buguruslan. Its order of battle was as follows:

- 1187th Rifle Regiment
- 1189th Rifle Regiment
- 1191st Rifle Regiment
- 919th Artillery Regiment
- 484th Sapper Battalion
- 422nd Reconnaissance Company
- 377th Signal Company

The 219th Antitank Battalion would be added in early 1942. Col. Zakhar Nikitovich Usachyov was assigned to command of the division on 9 September, and he continued in command until 8 June 1942, being promoted to major general on 21 May. After a couple of months in the Volga District the division was moved north to the Moscow area, where it was assigned to the 60th (Reserve) Army which was forming there. In late December the 358th, in common with two other rifle divisions of this Army, was transferred to the newly formed 4th Shock Army (re-designated from 27th Army), while the headquarters became the basis of the 3rd Shock Army, both in Northwestern Front. At the start of the offensive on Toropets in January 1942, the division had 10,000 men on strength, making it nearly full-strength for this period of the war.

=== Toropets-Kholm Offensive ===
On 18 December the STAVKA of the Supreme High Command issued its Order No. 005868 to the command of Northwestern Front, spelling out the goals and objectives of this operation:

"No later than 26 December 1941 to strike with at least six reinforced divisions from the Ostashkov area in the general direction of Toropets, Velizh and Rudnya, having the task, in cooperation with forces of Kalinin Front, to cut off the enemy's paths of retreat and not allow him to defend along his prepared front lines... Ultimately, pressing the offensive to Rudnya will cut off Smolensk from the west."

In the event the operation would not begin until 9 January 1942, due to the poor road and rail network. 4th Shock, commanded by Col. Gen. Andrey Yeryomenko, deployed on a front 50 km wide, facing most of the 253rd Infantry Division; with just 10,000 men the German "line" was in fact a string of outposts, although well-fortified since the Germans had occupied this sector since October. The Army also had 790 guns of 76mm caliber or greater for support. At the outset the 358th was in second echelon with the 332nd and 334th Rifle Divisions and 21st Rifle Brigade.

4th Shock was to initially advance towards Andreapol. Following a 90-minute artillery preparation the leading divisions broke through the thin German defenses and advanced as much as 15 km. During the coming week the first echelon divisions surrounded and destroyed a reinforced battalion of the newly arrived 189th Regiment of 81st Infantry Division and liberated Andreapol, seizing needed supplies. While they continued to advance on Toropets, the second echelon was directed southwestward to maintain contact with 22nd Army of Kalinin Front. Toropets was taken on 21 January with an even larger hoard of much-needed supplies, while the 358th and other second echelon units pushed on towards Velizh, cutting the rail line from Rzhev to Velikiye Luki the same day. On 22, 4 January and 3 Shock Armies were transferred to Kalinin Front.

During the rest of January and into February the division took part in several attempts to break into and liberate Velizh, but these were stymied on its outskirts. Finally, 4th Shock Army took up defensive lines, where it remained into the summer of 1943. General Usachyov was moved to command of the 262nd Rifle Division, and was replaced by Lt. Col. Semyon Aleksandrovich Vrublevsky on 9 June. He held the post until 9 February 1943, when he was replaced by Col. Nikifor Yegorovich Lubyagin.

== Battles for Vitebsk ==
On 31 August, S. A. Vrublevsky returned to command of the 358th with the rank of colonel. As of 1 October the division was in 92nd Rifle Corps, on the south flank of 4th Shock Army. During the month it was transferred, with its Corps, to 43rd Army, as 4th Shock became more involved in the fighting around Nevel. On 15 October, 92nd Corps struck the boundary of the German 87th and 14th Infantry Divisions in the Surazh and Ianovichi sectors with its 358th and 332nd Rifle Divisions, 145th Rifle Brigade, and 105th Separate Tank Regiment, but the assault made little progress.

A further attack by 43rd Army on 23 December penetrated the German defenses to within 2 km south of the road from Surazh to Vitebsk. The next day the 358th and 334th Rifle Divisions together succeeded in "biting a chunk" out of the defenses of 14th Infantry Division further northwest along the same road. Along with the pressure being applied by 4th Shock Army in the Gorodok area, this success forced the 3rd Panzer Army to pull its LIII Army Corps, fighting northwest of Vitebsk, back into new defenses even closer to the city. During the latter half of January 1944, the 358th was transferred back to 4th Shock Army, this time in 91st Rifle Corps, but remained in second echelon assembly areas in the Army's rear over the coming months.

== Vyborg–Petrozavodsk Offensive ==
After about six weeks in the Reserve of the Supreme High Command for rest and replenishment, the 358th was assigned to the 21st Army, which was moved at the end of April to the Karelian Isthmus, north of Leningrad, in anticipation of a final showdown with Finland. At the end of May, the division's strength was recorded as follows: 811 officers; 2,012 NCOs; 4,139 enlisted men; for a total of 6,962 personnel, including 134 sick or wounded in the divisional medical units. For equipment and transport it had: 98 trucks; 707 horses; 2,725 rifles; 2,402 sub-machine guns; 241 light machine guns; 81 heavy machine guns; 54 50mm mortars; 54 82mm mortars; 18 120mm mortars; 36 45mm antitank guns; and 211 antitank rifles. In addition, it had 44 76mm guns. The 76mm infantry guns in the rifle regiments had been replaced by ZiS-3 guns, and these also equipped the antitank battalion (12 guns), with 20 more in the artillery regiment, along with the standard 12 122mm howitzers.

In 21st Army the division was assigned to the 97th Rifle Corps, along with the 178th and 381st Rifle Divisions. In the plan for the offensive, 97th Corps was deployed on the right flank of its Army, and would be handed off to 23rd Army after the crossing of the Sestra River. The 358th and 381st were in the Corps first echelon, on a front of 9.5 km.

On the evening of 9 June the first echelon rifle corps of 21st Army fired a 15-minute artillery preparation, followed by a reconnaissance-in-force to assess the damage. The offensive proper began at 0820 hrs. on 10 June, following a 140-minute artillery onslaught. 97th Corps attacked towards Kallelovo and penetrated the forward Finnish defenses, but only advanced 5 km, reaching the south bank of the Sestra by the end of the day. Meanwhile, the Finns were ordered to pull back to their second line. For the next day, the Corps was ordered to continue the advance on Kallelovo, and at 1500 hrs. the handover to 23rd Army took place. By day's end the 97th and 98th Rifle Corps reached the Termolovo-Khirelia line. On 12 June, 97th Corps enveloped Termolovo from the west to northeast, but the pace of the advance was slowing, and it became clear that a regrouping would be necessary before tackling that second line. The 358th was withdrawn to the Front reserve for a brief rest and refitting.

On 17 June, Colonel Vrublevsky left his command of the division, being replaced by Col. Pavel Filippovich Zaretsky four days later. Zaretsky had been deputy commander of the 53rd Guards Rifle Division until being wounded and hospitalized in February. Apart from a short break in early 1945, he would remain in command for the duration of the war, being promoted to the rank of major general on 5 May 1945.

Between 14 and 17 June the two Soviet armies penetrated the second Finnish defense line and were in pursuit towards the third. The high command still considered that progress was too slow, and orders emanated from Moscow exhorting them on to Vyborg. To this end, the rested 97th Corps was again subordinated to 21st Army on the morning of the 18th and, supported by the 1st and 152nd Tank Brigades, prepared to take the lead in breaking the third line. The Corps was to penetrate between Summa and Markki at the boundary of the Finnish 4th Infantry Division and 3rd Infantry Brigade, advance along the Summa-Vyborg road to Khumola, and capture a railroad junction south of the city. 72nd Rifle Division would cover the Corps' left flank while, farther left, the 110th Rifle Corps would also attack near Summa.

The assault, backed by massive artillery support, began early on 19 June and gained almost immediate success. Overall, the forces of 21st Army ripped a 70 km-wide gap in the Finnish defenses from Muola to the Gulf of Finland, and advanced as much as 14 km during 18 hours of bitter fighting against determined but confused resistance. 97th Corps drove north on the Vyborg road, smashing the Finnish IV Army Corps in the process; at the end of the day 152nd Tank Brigade was attacking Autiokorpela. The plan for the next day called for 97th Corps to advance along the rail line and then envelop Vyborg's defenses from the northeast. When the advance began in the morning the Soviets soon learned that the Finns had abandoned the city overnight. The 358th would subsequently be granted its first battle honor, "Leningrad", for its part in this victory, as well as a unit award of the Order of the Red Banner.

By August the division still had an average of 1,500 men in each rifle regiment, while the rifle companies had about 110 officers and men each, which was a very good front-line strength for that period of the war. After the Finnish armistice the division remained in 21st Army in the Leningrad Front, transferring to 94th Rifle Corps in September; it would remain in this Corps for the duration. At about the same time 21st Army was moved to the Reserve of the Supreme High Command until December, when 94th Corps was reassigned to 39th Army in 3rd Belorussian Front. The 358th would remain in this Army for the duration.

== Battles for East Prussia ==
In the plan for the Vistula-Oder Offensive, 39th Army was on the right flank of 3rd Belorussian Front, south of the Neman River. 94th Rifle Corps was in the first echelon with 5th Guards Rifle Corps, facing a breakthrough sector 8 km wide, with the immediate objective of destroying the enemy forces in the Pilkallen area, before advancing westward and capturing Tilsit by the end of the fifth day. The offensive began on 12 January 1945, and made immediate progress. However, on the 14th the Germans launched heavy counterattacks along the front while the Soviet advance ran into deeply echeloned defenses. 39th Army beat off as many as 15 such attacks by up to a battalion in strength, backed by 8-16 tanks apiece. The 124th Rifle Division was committed into battle from behind the 358th's right flank, broke into Pilkallen and seized the railroad station, the only significant advance of the day.

The division was ordered to speed up its attack on the morning of 18 January, in the general direction of Raudonatchen. By this time it was clear that 39th Army was making the best progress among the armies of the Front, and the 1st Tank Corps was moved in to exploit. In its wake, the 94th Corps reached the line of the Inster River near Raudonatchen, advancing as much as 20 km. This advance prepared the way for elements of 43rd Army to break into Tilsit in the afternoon of 19 January, while the 94th Corps advanced to the Tilsit-Insterburg railroad. On 22 January the division was on the march and took the town of Kukers, while 39th Army overall reached the Curonian Lagoon along the line of the Deime River, splitting the German defense. After hard fighting over the next day this river line was forced, and the way was open to Königsberg.

The right-flank armies of 3rd Belorussian Front were tasked with capturing the city, and on 27 January they had reached its outskirts. 94th Corps, in the Schoenwalde area, was counterattacked twice, with heavy artillery support. Despite this, it broke through the fortified defenses north of the Alter Pregel River, took the strongpoints of Gamsau and Praddau, and on the following day reached the fortifications of the city itself, becoming involved in stubborn fighting. And here the sector remained static until early April. When the final assault began on 6 April the 94th Corps had two divisions in the first echelon and one in the second, plus considerable reinforcements. By the end of the day 39th Army advanced up to 4 km, despite counterattacks by 5th Panzer Division from the west. During the next day the Army was counterattacked 18 times, slowing its advance. By the end of 9 April the German garrison capitulated, while 39th Army was regrouping for subsequent operations into the western part of the Samland Peninsula.

Colonel Zaretsky distinguished himself on several occasions during the East Prussian campaign. On 13 January he led his troops from the front while attempting to break the enemy defenses south of Pilkallen. During a river-crossing operation he entered the small bridgehead as an inspiration to his men. During the fighting in the Samland Peninsula a German counterattack by infantry and tank-destroyers of the Marder type broke through to the division's command post. Zaretsky organized the defense, then took up an anti-tank rifle with which he knocked out one of the enemy vehicles. During further fighting in mid-February, during the siege of Königsberg, another German counterattack hit the division's defenses, and Zaretsky was again in a close quarters fight. He was wounded by grenade fragments in his back, but refused to evacuate to the base hospital and remained in command of the division. Zaretsky also led one of his division's storm groups during the final battle for Königsberg in April. In recognition of his actions, he was awarded the Gold Star of a Hero of the Soviet Union on 19 April (medal no. 6177).

== Manchurian Operation and Postwar ==
39th Army was chosen for the invasion of Japanese-held Manchuria in large part due to its experience in East Prussia; the Japanese frontier was known to be heavily fortified. It began shipping eastwards not long after the German capitulation, and by 1 July it was in the Transbaikal Front. In the plan for the offensive, the 39th was on the Front's left flank, and was facing the Greater Khingan mountains. The operation began on 9 August, and after passing the mountains at Tarchu, the 358th turned due south to link up with the 124th Rifle Division which was engaged with the Japanese forces defending the Halung-Arshaan fortified area. By 16 August the division was participating in the reduction of the last enemy positions in this area. The offensive ended with the Japanese capitulation on 20 August. The division was awarded its second battle honor for this offensive.

The 358th ended the war with the complete title of 358th Rifle, Leningrad-Khingan, Order of the Red Banner, Order of Suvorov Division (Russian: 358-я стрелковая Ленинградско-Хинганская Краснознамённая ордена Суворова дивизия). It was disbanded later in 1945 at Port Arthur while part of the 113th Rifle Corps.
