= Mikhail Rudakov =

Mikhail Vasilyevich Rudakov (Russian: Михаил Васильевич Рудаков; 15 November 1905 – 5 August 1979) was a Soviet military leader, Member of the Military Council of several Fronts during World War II, reaching service rank of lieutenant general.

== Career ==
Since 1923, joined the Red Army.

Since 1926, became a member of the Soviet Communist Party.

1938, graduated from the Lenin Military-Political Academy.

1939, Political Commissar of 11th Army.

1941 September, Member of the Military Council of the 27th Army (renamed as 4th Shock Army in December 1941).

November 1942, Member of the Military Council of Southwestern Front (Soviet Union) (renamed as 3rd Ukrainian Front in October 1943)

April 1944, Member of the Military Council of the 3rd Baltic Front.

November 1944, Member of the Military Council of the 1st Baltic Front.

February 1945, Samland Group of Forces.

After World War II, political works in the Soviet Armed Forces.

1952, graduated from the General Staff Academy.

== Awards and honors ==
- Two Orders of Lenin
- Four Orders of the Red Banner
- Order of Kutuzov, 1st class
- Order of the Patriotic War, 1st class
- Order of the Red Banner of Labour
- Medal "For the Defence of Stalingrad"
- Medal "For the Victory over Germany in the Great Patriotic War 1941–1945"
- Medal "For the Capture of Königsberg"
- Medal "Veteran of the Armed Forces of the USSR"

== Sources ==
- "РУДАКОВ, Михаил Васильевич" (in Russian). Archived from the original on July 22, 2011.
