= Irina Belotelkin =

Russian-American artist and fashion designer (1913–2009)

Irina Roudakoff Belotelkin
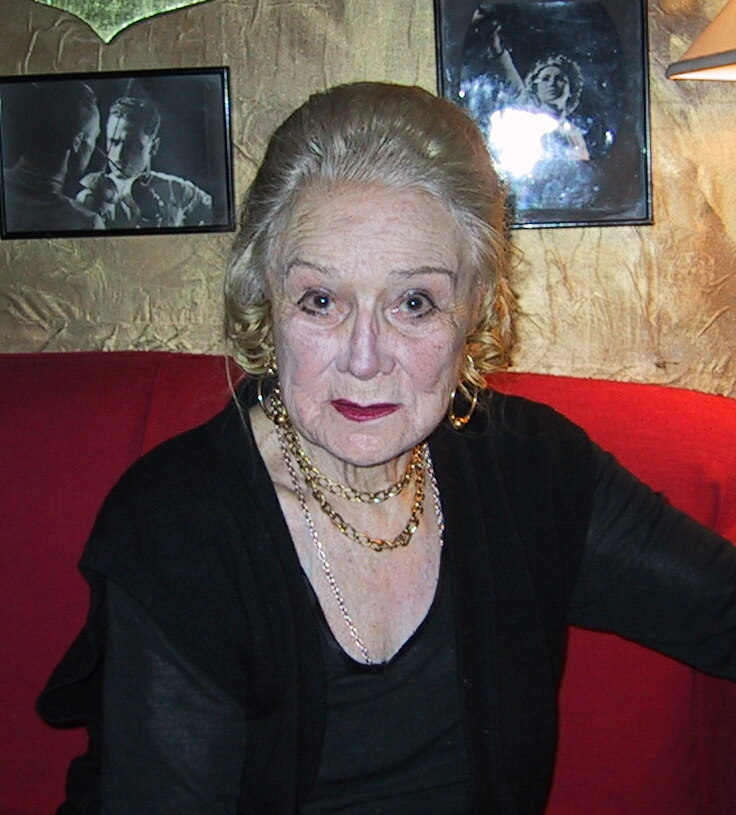
- Belotelkin in 2001
- Born: January 1, 1913; Elizabethgrad, Russian Empire
- Died: January 21, 2009 (aged 96); San Francisco, U.S.
- Occupations: Fashion designer, artist
- Known for: American fashion design and haute couture
- Label: Irina Roublon

Irina Roudakoff Belotelkin (January 1, 1913 – January 21, 2009) was a Russian-American artist and fashion designer.

== Early years ==
Irina Belotelkin, née Roudakoff, was born in Elisavetgrad, Russian Empire to the Russian noblesse ancienne as recorded in the imperial registers of Tver. A morganatic descendant of Catherine the Great, she was a student at the Mariinsky Noble Ladies' Institute, Novocherkassk, Russia (former capital of the Don Cossacks). She was orphaned at the time of the Russian Civil War after her father, General Paul Roudakoff, was fatally wounded in battle; 5 days later her mother died of typhus.

Her surviving brother, Paul Roudakoff, was at school in the elite Corps des Pages, and was evacuated to the banks of the Nile in Egypt with the entire Corps by their patron, King George V of the United Kingdom, who took responsibility for the school after the assassination of his cousins. (King George V was a first cousin to both Czar Nicholas II, and his Empress, Czarina Alexandra.)

Still unaware of her parents' death, and after witnessing her two sisters' deaths from starvation, the young Irina, then 8 years old, made her way over 1,000 kilometres, alone and through many privations (which forever shaped her core character), to Moscow and the Estonian embassy there, with whom her Estonian uncle Volodya Blonsky had made arrangements.

After a year in Moscow, and appeals to the Estonian consul, Irina was aided in a dramatic escape from the Soviet Union, to her aunt Anna Blonsky Lassburg (1882–1940) and her husband Doctor Genrick Lassburg in Tallinn, Estonia. Eventually, after in 1929, traveling through Ellis Island and admitted as a student, of voice studies, she joined her brother who—having been located in Egypt by the efforts of the International Red Cross—had settled, in 1923, in the United States. She was reunited with her Aunt Lucy (Olga) and Grandmother Natalia Blonsky (who had arrived earlier, in 1923, to New York from Constantinople (now Istanbul)).

== Young lady ==
Irina (her early transcription was Irene) lived with her brother in Hartford, Connecticut, attending post-graduate programs at Hartford Public High School in 1931. Her status as a visiting student was threatened when a spurned suitor reported her for working as an artist. She was returned to Ellis Island. Through the intercession of, and personal interview with, Fannie Perkins (then New York State's industrial commissioner and soon to become the first woman to serve as Secretary of Labor) Irina won a reprieve. Later, in a ceremony conducted by Chief Justice Hughes, she became a naturalized citizen. She studied voice, drama and opera. She finished fashion design school in New York City.

She was an avid, and ultimately champion, fencer. In one match, January 7, 1934, reported in the New York Times in which her brother, Paul Roudakoff, also competed, the New York Times reports: The Hartford Fencers Club women's team upset New York University's intercollegiate championship women's fencing unit, 10 to 6. Miss Irene (sic) Roudakoff, Hartford, in foils, defeated Miss Seiden, 5-4, Miss Suskin, 5-4, and Miss Mildred Atlas (substitute for Miss Hurwitz), 5-2. She lost to NYU's Miss Harriett Graver, 5-4.

Later she was awarded first prize, in foils, at the 1937 N.E. Women's Championship.

Irina was a masterful hostess, a discipline developed through years of dedicated practice. Here is an early example (May 5, 1943, New York Times) of what became her typical pattern of combining high-entertainment and worthy causes:

Members of the Strykers Lane Auxiliary, Inc., have arranged a Russian supper party in behalf of the Strykers Lane Community Center ... In charge of the arrangements is Mrs. Konstantine Belotelkin, whose aides include Mrs. Morris Ketchum, Mrs. Alistair Cooke, Mrs. Robert Crane Jr., Mrs. Walter Moffitt, and Mrs. Charles Tilton.

— New York Times, 5 May 1943

== San Francisco ==
Irina and Kostya came to San Francisco during the Second World War, where Kostya, an engineer, was involved in the building of Liberty ships. Later, Kostya's engineering firm executed several high-profile projects. Irina's fashion design and art careers also flourished.

Among Irina's devotions were ballet and opera. She often entertained friends Rudolf Nureyev, Mikhail Baryshnikov, and Sergei Leiferkus when they were in town. Natalia Makarova and Yuri Possokhov were often guests at Irina's Russian Christmas and Easter parties. She was a major contributor to the San Francisco Opera, maintaining a box during the season for many years.

In later years her Easter party preparations and recipes were featured in several magazines. The March 1978 issue of Sphere ran a multi-page article entitled A Russian Feast. Irina is pictured, with the caption:

An artist and connoisseur dedicated to preserving the Easter rituals of her St. Petersburg childhood, Mrs. Konstantin Beloteklin collects antique Russian Easter eggs and celebrates the holiday each year with a classic feast. Above, with her own paintings in the background, she displays a gilded egg that belonged to Czar Nicholas II; on the opposite page, the chilled vodkas, flavored with peppercorns, lemon peel and buffalo grass, that she prepares for the celebration.

Belotelkin was noted for her interest in literature and her knowledge of history. She was a prominent conversationalist and was recognized for her storytelling and collection of historical anecdotes.

She lived with her husband in San Francisco, California. They were devoted to their dogs, Samoyeds, Dushenka and Dushenka Deux. She died at home on January 21, 2009, at the age of 96.

== Fashion design ==
Irina excelled in several design fields.

Following fashion design school in New York City, and her move to San Francisco Irina opened, in 1945, her first studio-salon, as a millinery designer: EraBelle Hat Shop. For her shop's logo she used her fencing mask and a pair of foils.

Designer's Roublon shop logo

She created 118 headdresses for the Headdress Ball at the San Francisco Museum of Art. Her hats were recognized in San Francisco (where they were frequently remarked by Herb Caen) and beyond. She also created a special collection of miniature hats.

She later shifted to American haute couture. She became San Francisco's most notable couturier, designing gowns, outfits, and coats under the label Irina Roublon, with her own maison at San Francisco's Union Square.

Among other accomplishments, in 1953 she was invited to Milan, and designed the costumes for the La Scala production of Puccini's opera La Fanciulla del West.

Her 1955 Holiday Collection show at her Stockton studio featured 43 selections, one executed by Gellenghi, Florence, Italy. She later moved the atelier to 260 Sutter St.

She dressed many of the city's grande dames, including Ann Getty Light, Katherine Trefethen, Barbara Morgan Eisele, Kathryn Crosby, Maud Hill Schroll, Princess Natasha Romanoff, etc. Herb Caen often referred to her as Chanel of the West Coast.

The August 20, 1961, Saturday Evening Post describes her decade-long effort, as part of the San Francisco chapter of Fashion Group International (FGI), with Jane Winthrop, in the San Francisco Mental Health Fashion Therapy Program which aimed to give fashion therapy to the mentally ill. These activities involved the patients in both staging and presenting fashion, and in showing them how to dress fashionably. The doctors commented on the improvement of their patients. Irina introduced, in 1961, the blue print of Fashion Therapy to the Paris Fashion Group.

In 1963 Irina was the Advisor for Fashion Lift, a tour of US Fashion Industry of European Couturiers.

Among the rare quality images are those by renowned photographer David Lees (1918–2004), of Irina and Irina Roublon gowns and outfits in Florence, Italy, in the years 1951–1955.

== Artist ==
From the early 1960s through the late 1980s, Irina studied and prolifically created still life and portrait paintings in oil and water color, excelling in flower compositions. She held studio and feature exhibitions; she competed and won prizes. Her work is in holdings throughout the SFBay area.

In 1965 she undertook private study with two prominent Russian painters, including Serge Ivanoff; she executed a portrait of her two masters. She cherished her portrait as executed by Serge Ivanoff.

Among her most accomplished pieces are those of iris and the large white Matilija poppy, which she grew and attended in her own garden.

One rare instance of foregoing her famed Easter parties was 1988 when she was preparing for her April 30, 1988, show at Mae Woo's William Gallery in St. Helena.

She painted portraits of several prominent San Franciscans. One portrait, a charcoal, of a young Gordon Getty, who'd frequented her studio as a young lad, remained in her personal collection for 3 decades. She presented it to Gordon at his 2005 birthday celebration.

She continued her artistic endeavors, including a foray into sculpture, until she lost her facility to a crippling mastectomy.

== Cultural references ==
- "Isn't it fabulous? Valery is a genius," said our official Russian aristo, Irina Belotelkin, who didn't need to read the supertitles. Valery, of course, is Gergiev, Kirov artistic director and maestro.
- The "A" List. Irina Belotelkin.

== Memorable anecdotes ==
- When Dior saw one of her coat designs, he asked her, slyly, if she would 'forget' her coat for a few hours.
- When her work was displayed in a downtown San Francisco department store display window, the caption was Dior or Roublon? The display had works by both designers. Customers overwhelmingly selected her designs over his.
