= 4th Shock Army =

- Active: 1941–1945
- Country: USSR
- Allegiance: Soviet Union
- Branch: Regular Army
- Type: Shock Army
- Role: Combined Arms
- Part of: Front
- Engagements: World War II; Toropets–Kholm Offensive; Nevel Offensive; Gorodok Offensive; Polotsk–Vitebsk Offensive; Rezhitsa–Dvinsk Offensive; Riga Offensive; Vitebsk–Orsha Offensive; Memel Offensive; Courland Pocket

Commanders
- Notable commanders: Marshal of the Soviet Union Andrey Yeryomenko

The 4th Shock Army was a combined arms army of the Soviet Armed Forces during World War II.

The Army was formed from the 27th Army on 25 December 1941 (1st formation) within the Northwestern Front. On 1 October 1942 it included the 249th, 332nd, 334th, 358th and 360th Rifle Divisions, 21st Rifle Brigade, a number of separate tank battalions, the 66th, 67th, 68th, and 69th separate ski battalions, artillery and other subunits.

== History ==
The army defended the line along the eastern shore of lakes Velye and Seliger. It participated in the Toropets–Kholm Offensive between January and February 1942. For the offensive, it included the 249th, 332nd, 334th, 358th and 360th Rifle Divisions, 21st, 39th, 48th and 51st rifle brigades, two tank battalions, two rocket launcher battalions (batteries), and two RGK artillery regiments. The army was reassigned to the reassigned to the Kalinin Front on 22 January 1942. The front was redesignated as the 1st Baltic Front on 20 October 1943. During the Byelorussian Strategic Offensive (1943), the army participated in the Nevel Offensive, Gorodok Offensive, and the Polotsk–Vitebsk Offensive. During the second half of 1944 the army was reassigned to the 2nd Baltic (4 July), and 1st Baltic (from 8 August) fronts, participating in the Rezhitsa–Dvinsk Offensive, the Riga Offensive, and the Memel Offensive. The blockade of the Courland Pocket was its final combat operation. During the latter, the army was reassigned to the 2nd Baltic Front on 9 February 1945 and then to the Leningrad Front on 1 April 1945. From the Baltic in the summer of 1945, the army was dispatched to northern Kazakhstan, where its headquarters formed the basis of the new Steppe Military District (on 9 May 1945? – source Ruwiki). Two rifle corps and six rifle divisions arrived alongside the army.

== Battle composition ==
4th Shock Army Separate reserve battalion airfield services (4 March 1942 to 28 April 1942). Reformed as the 832nd Separate Battalion of Airfield Services 28 April 1942.

- 320 separate ski-destroyer battalion
- 262 - 266 separate ski battalions (February to May 1942)

== Commanders ==
- Colonel-General Andrey Yeryomenko (December 1941 - February 1942)
- Lieutenant General Filipp Golikov (February - March 1942)
- Major-General, in May 1942, Lieutenant-General Vladimir Kurasov (March 1942 - April 1943)
- Major General Dmitry Seleznev (April - May 1943)
- Major-General, to October 1943, Lieutenant-General Vasily Shvetsov - May - December 1943
- Lieutenant General Pyotr Malyshev - (December 1943 – September 1945)

== The members of the Military Council ==
- Brigadier Commissioner Rudakov, Mikhail - December 1941 - November 1942
- Major General Tevchenkov, Alexander - November 1942 - April 1943
- Colonel, in September 1943, Major General Belik Trofim Ya - April 1943 - until the end of the war.

== Chiefs of Staff ==
- Major General Kurasov, Vladimir V. - December 1941 - March 1942
- Colonel Viktor Portugalov - March–May 1942
- Major General Glinsky, Peter Yevstigneyevich - May 1942 - June 1943
- Major General Kudryashov, Alexander - June 1943 - before the end of the war.
