= Paul Roudakoff =

US Army officer (1907-1993)

Paul P. Roudakoff
- Born: December 17, 1907; Elizabethgrad, Russian Empire
- Died: December 4, 1993 (aged 85) San Francisco, U.S.
- Allegiance: United States
- Branch: United States Army
- Service years: 1942–1948
- Rank: Lt. Colonel
- Commands: Chief of the Liaison and Protocol Division at OMGUS in Berlin, Germany
- Conflicts: World War II

Paul P. Roudakoff (17 December 1907 – 4 December 1993) was a Lt. Colonel in the U.S. Army, serving in 1945 through 1948 as Executive Officer and Deputy Chief, and later as Chief, of the Liaison and Protocol section at OMGUS (Office of the Military Governor, United States) in Berlin, Germany. Retaining his assignment, he moved to the United States Department of State, serving through 1953.

== Early years ==
Paul P. Roudakoff, was born to the Russian noblesse ancienne as recorded in the imperial registers of Tver. A morganatic descendant of Catherine the Great, he was orphaned at the time of the Russian Civil War after his father, General, also named Paul Roudakoff, was wounded in battle, and his mother died of typhus five days later.

Paul Roudakoff was at school in the elite Corps des Pages, and was evacuated to the banks of the Nile in Egypt with the entire Corps by their patron, King George V of the United Kingdom, who was a first cousin to both Czar Nicholas II, and his Empress, Czarina Alexandra, and who took responsibility for the school after the assassination of his cousins.

In 1923, Paul received a Military and Arts degree from the Russian Imperial Military Academy.

His surviving sister, Irina Roudakoff (Roublon) Belotelkin, made her way more than 1,000 kilometers, alone as a 9-year-old, to relatives in Moscow where she was eventually transferred to relatives in Estonia and eventually joined her brother when he settled in the United States.

== Young adult ==
Paul became a naturalized citizen of the United States in 1930. He attended and graduated from Hillyer Evening College (later part of chartering University of Hartford).

In the years 1924 through 1942, Paul worked as a purchasing agent, advertising manager, junior consultant, and account executive with the Life Insurance Sales Research Bureau.

Paul was a member of the Connecticut National Guard from 1928 through 1942.

He was a member of the Hartford Fencing Club, Hartford Connecticut, an enthusiasm he shared with his sister Irina; both were top performers.

Paul's classmate from the Corps des Pages, and fellow member of the Russian ancien régime, Konstantine Belotelkin, married (17 September 1942) his sister, Irina.

Paul married Borgny Bistrop (17 November 1899—July 1985) in October 1943. They had one son, Victor (14 August 1944—31 July 1979).

== Service in the U.S. Army and State Department ==
Between 1942 and 1946 Paul joined the U.S. Army, where he rose from the rank of 1st Lieutenant to Lt. Colonel. He served with the Chicago Signal Depot from 1942 to 1945.

He ultimately took a commission in the army, retiring as a Lt. Colonel after serving as Chief of the Liaison and Protocol Division at OMGUS in the divided city of Berlin following the Second World War. Following the end of the war, Roudakoff maintained his position at OMGUS, but transferred to civilian service (Department of State) in 1948. It was during the post-war period that Roudakoff served as the Russian interpreter for then-Chief of Staff of the U.S. Army and Military Governor Dwight D. Eisenhower’s to Marshal Georgi Zhukov, and various other military, civilian officials.

In Paul's memoir, appearing as part of Collier's Magazine edition on Eisenhower's meeting at the Potsdam Conference, 1945, with Marshal Zhukov (Paul is pictured with the two) he recounts translating Eisenhower's words:

The whole world, a hopeful world, is watching us for a genuine indication of our generosity, of our ability to compromise and settle issues. We must manage to agree here, for the sake of all nations involved.

— Eisenhower, Collier's Magazine, 22 July 1955, translated by Paul Roudakoff

He retired (FSS-2) from the Department of State in 1953.

== Later years ==
In later years, Roudakoff was a consultant for Pan American World Airways, RCA Corporation and Bechtel Corporation. He moved to San Francisco in 1991.
