= Toropets–Kholm offensive =

World War II Red Army military operation

Coordinates: 57°09′N 31°11′E

Toropets-Kholm offensive
- Part of the Eastern Front of World War II
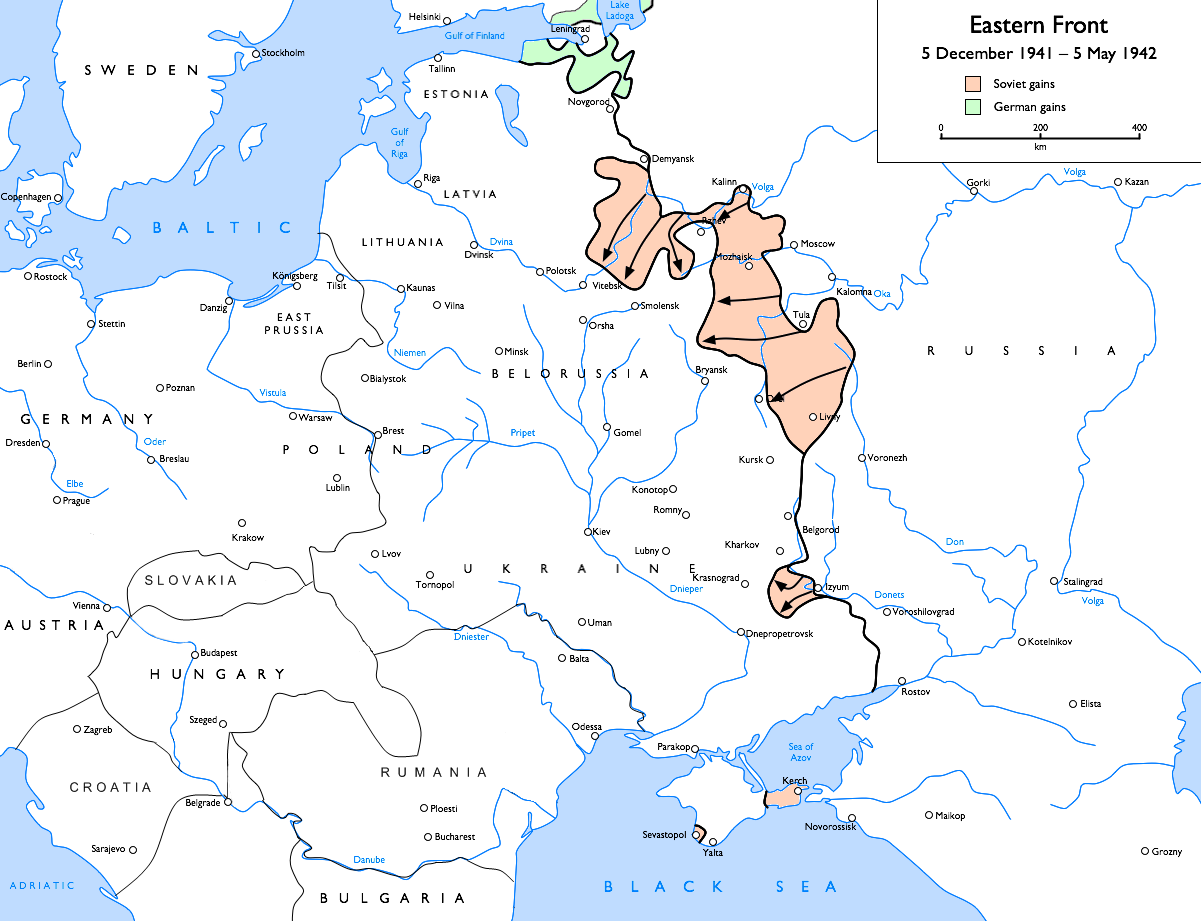
- World War II Eastern Front during the 1942 winter counter-offensive
Date	9 January – 6 February 1942
Location	Northwestern Russia
Result	Soviet victory

Belligerents
Germany	Soviet Union

Commanders and leaders
(Nazi Germany) Ernst Busch	(Soviet Union) Pavel Kurochkin

Units involved
(Nazi Germany) 16th Army; II Corps; 123rd Division; 81st Division; SS Cavalry Brigade	(Soviet Union) North-Western Front; 3rd Shock Army; 23rd Division; 33rd Division; 257th Division; 4th Shock Army; 249th Division; 332nd Division; 334th Division; 358th Division; 360th Rifle Division

Strength
Unknown	122,100

Casualties and losses
12,000 killed (Soviet estimate)	10,400 killed or missing 18,810 wounded Total: 29,200

The Toropets–Kholm offensive was a military operation conducted south of Lake Ilmen by the Red Army during World War II, from 9 January–6 February 1942. The operation contributed to the formation of the Kholm Pocket and the encirclement of the Wehrmacht's II Army Corps in the Demyansk Pocket.

== Background ==
Following the successful Moscow counter-offensive of December 1941, the Stavka of the Red Army decided to conduct a broad-front offensive with the aim of destroying the invading German forces in the Soviet Union. The Wehrmacht did not expect the Red Army to be capable of such a wide-ranging offensive, and therefore was caught off guard by attacks in areas that it supposed to be quiet, such as the region south of Lake Ilmen.

=== Objective ===
The Soviet North-Western Front—under General Pavel Kurochkin—was given two tasks to be executed from its position south of Lake Ilmen. The first was a western thrust through Staraya Russa, to split German 18th Army and 16th Army, and support the effort of Volkhov Front and Leningrad Front in breaking the siege of Leningrad. The second was a south-western thrust toward Vitebsk. This attack was to be conducted by three armies, 33rd, 3rd and 4th Shock, the latter two having just recently been renamed. Its ultimate aim was to become the northern pincer of a deep envelopment of German Army Group Center.

== Battle ==
The initial penetration of the 3rd and 4th Shock Armies was very successful. German forces in the sector were overrun with heavy losses. The failure to predict this attack—coupled with multiple demands on the German reserves—gave the Soviet Front command an opening which it exploited to the utmost, driving deep into the German rear. While the Soviet forces had few supplies at the start of the offensive, they could keep going through the capture of significant amounts of German supply stores at Toropets.

The tank support for such an operation was very weak on the Soviet side, especially compared to the requirements of the doctrine of Deep operations, and the practice later in the war, showing the dearth of resources in the Soviet arsenal at this low point of Soviet fortunes in the war. Yeremenko's 4th Shock Army had only two tank battalions, the 171st Tank Battalion with 12 Lend-Lease Matilda IIs, nine Valentines, and 10 T-60s, and the 141st Tank Battalion had four KV-1s, six T-34s, and 20 T-60s.

The drive of the Soviet forces was so strong that the defending German formation—123rd Infantry Division, which was covering a line of 30 km (19 mi)—had its forward two regiments overrun. The regiments were so thinly spread in their strongpoints that they could not cover each other, allowing the Soviet assault forces to simply walk through between them. The strongpoints were later reduced, with significant casualties for the Germans. A German reserve formation—the 81st Infantry Division—was brought in by rail during the last days of December. Its first regiment—the 189th Infantry under Colonel Hohmeyer together with the 2nd Battalion of Artillery Regiment 181 and the 3rd Company of the Engineer Battalion 181—was immediately ordered to detrain at Toropets and Andreapol. From there, it advanced to Okhvat where it was encircled and completely destroyed on 14 January. 1,100 dead were later found in a forest near Okhvat, including the regimental commander who was posthumously promoted to Major General. A total of 40 survivors from the artillery battalion made it back to the German lines. The move into action and collapse was so swift that the regiment was not even identified on German situation maps.

== Aftermath ==
The Soviet aim of encircling Army Group Center was not achieved, but the attack by the two Shock Armies created a deep bend in the German frontline that was to become a major concern for the German army group commands during 1942, until the Rzhev Salient, of which this bend formed the northern border, was evacuated in March 1943.

The Soviet attack also created the Kholm Pocket, and the southern shoulder of the Demyansk Pocket.

== Order of battle ==
=== Soviet ===
- North-Western Front (elements with a strength of 122,100) (Pavel Kurochkin)
  - 3rd Shock Army (Maksim Purkayev)
    - 23rd Rifle Division
    - 33rd Rifle Division
    - 257th Rifle Division
    - 20th, 27th, 31st, 42nd, 45th, 54th Rifle Brigades
    - 63rd, 65th, 67th, 78th, 79th, 80th Ski Battalions
    - 170th Tank Battalion
  - 4th Shock Army (Andrey Yeryomenko)
    - 249th Rifle Division
    - 332nd Rifle Division
    - 334th Rifle Division
    - 358th Rifle Division
    - 360th Rifle Division
    - 21st Rifle Brigade
    - 62nd, 64th Ski Battalions
    - 141st, 171st Tank Battalions

=== German ===
- Army Group North (elements of with unknown strength)
  - 16th Army (Ernst Busch)
    - II. Army Corps (Walter von Brockdorff-Ahlefeldt)
      - 123rd Infantry Division
        - 416th Infantry Regiment
        - 418th Infantry Regiment
      - 81st Infantry Division
        - 189th Infantry Regiment
      - SS Cavalry Brigade
