= 1st Baltic Front =

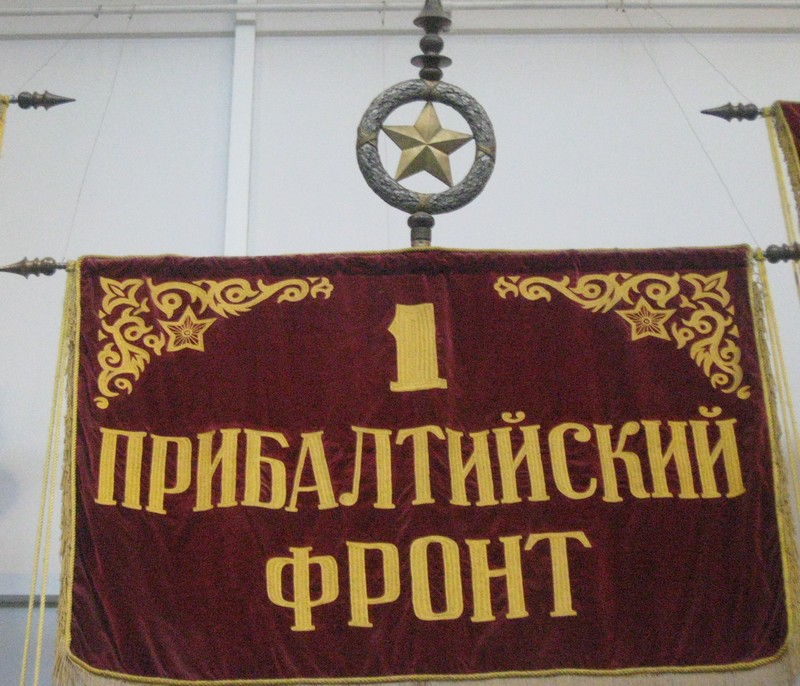
- Standard of the 1st Baltic Front
- Active: 12 October 1943 – 1945
- Country: Soviet Union
- Branch: Red Army
- Type: Army group
- Role: Co-ordination and conduct of Red Army Operations in the Baltic, North Poland and East Prussian regions
- Size: 3 Armies
- Engagements: Operation Bagration; Baltic Offensive; East Prussian offensive Siege of Leningrad; Battle of Memel

Commanders
- Notable commanders: Hovhannes Bagramyan

The First Baltic Front (Russian: Пéрвый Прибалтийский фронт) was a major formation of the Red Army during the Second World War. It was commanded by Army General Andrey Yeryomenko, succeeded by Army General Bagramyan. It was formed by renaming the Kalinin Front on 12 October 1943, and took part in several important military operations, most notably Bagration in the summer of 1944. The 1st Baltic Front also assisted in lifting the siege of Leningrad on 27 January 1944, as well as in Operation Samland, at that time known as the Samland Group, captured Königsberg in April 1945.

== Composition ==
As of 23 June 1944, the First Baltic Front consisted of the following units and their commanders:

Baltic Front, led by front commander Army General Hovhannes Bagramyan

4th Shock Army, led by General-Lieutenant Pyotr Malyshev

- 83rd Rifle Corps

6th Guards Army, led by General Lieutenant Ivan Chistyakov

- 2nd Guards Rifle Corps
- 22nd Guards Rifle Corps
- 23rd Guards Rifle Corps
- 103rd Guards Rifle Corps
- Army artillery

43rd Army, led by General Lieutenant Afanasy Beloborodov

- 1st Rifle Corps
- 60th Rifle Corps
- 92nd Rifle Corps
- 1st Tank Corps

3rd Air Army, led by General Lieutenant N. F. Papivin

- 11th Fighter Aviation Corps

== Leaders ==
=== Commander ===
1. Army General Andrey Yeremenko (October – 19 November 1943)
2. Army General Ivan Bagramyan (19 November 1943 – February 1945)

=== Military Commissar ===
1. Lieutenant General Dmitry Leonov (October 1943 – November 1944)
2. Lieutenant General Mikhail Rudakov (November 1944 – February 1945)

=== Chief of Staff ===
1. Colonel General Vladimir Kurasov (October 1943 – February 1945)
