= 60th Rifle Corps =

The 60th Rifle Corps was a Rifle corps of the Red Army.

The numerical designation "60" appears to have been attached to the formation that quickly became the 4th Airborne Corps after the beginning of Operation Barbarossa. The corps was then active 1943–45, ending the war with the 2nd Guards Army. Soon after the end of the war, by December 1945 it was transferred to the Stavropol Military District with headquarters at Pyatigorsk with its wartime divisions. At some later point (sources disagree), the 23rd Bratislava Red Banner Rifle Corps was disbanded by renumbering it as the 60th Rifle Corps.

Within the former 23rd-now-60th Rifle Corps was the 252nd Rifle Division, which became the 15th Separate Rifle Brigade on July 1, 1946. The division's 924th, 928th, and 932nd Rifle Regiments became the 168th, 172nd, and 176th Separate Rifle Battalions, respectively, while the divisional artillery brigade was eliminated. The 787th Artillery Regiment, 23rd Separate Self-Propelled Artillery Battery with the SU-76s, the 332nd Separate Motor Reconnaissance Company, and communications, sapper, and training rifle companies rounded out the brigade. The brigade, with a total personnel strength of 2,010, had all of its units at Nalchik except for the 787th Artillery Regiment at Prokhladny. The brigade was disbanded in May 1947.

Other rifle brigades that formed part of the corps also reported a strength of 2,010 in 1946.
