= Ivan Managarov =

Ivan Mefodyevich Managarov
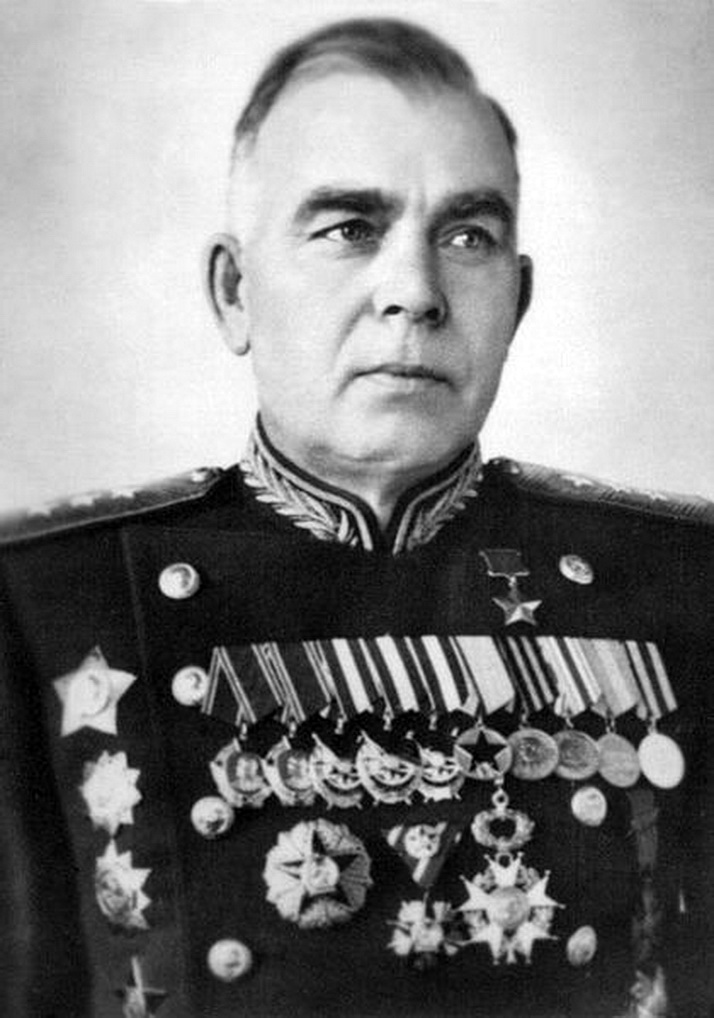
- Managarov, c. 1945
- Born: 12 June [O.S. 31 May] 1898; Yenakiyevo, Yekaterinoslav Governorate, Russian Empire
- Died: 27 November 1981 (aged 83) Yalta, Crimean Oblast, Ukrainian SSR, Soviet Union
- Allegiance: Russian Empire; Russian SFSR; Soviet Union
- Branch: Imperial Russian Army; Red Army
- Service years: 1914–1915; 1918–1953
- Rank: Colonel general
- Commands: 8th Cavalry Division; 26th Rifle Corps; 16th Cavalry Corps; 7th Cavalry Corps; 41st Army; 53rd Army; 4th Army
- Conflicts: World War I; Russian Civil War; World War II
- Awards: Hero of the Soviet Union; Order of Lenin (3); Order of the October Revolution; Order of the Red Banner (3); Order of Suvorov, 1st class; Order of Kutuzov, 1st class; Order of Bogdan Khmelnitsky, 1st class; Order of the Red Star

Ivan Mefodyevich Managarov (Russian: Иван Мефодьевич Манагаров; 12 June [O.S. 31 May] 1898 – 27 November 1981) was a Soviet Army colonel general and a Hero of the Soviet Union who held field army command during World War II.

A decorated veteran of the Imperial Russian Army, Managarov fought as a cavalryman in the Russian Civil War and rose to division command by the late 1930s. After commanding a rifle and cavalry corps in the Soviet Far East and front reserve in 1941–1942, Managarov briefly commanded the 41st Army before being appointed commander of the 53rd Army in early 1943. He led the army for most of the rest of the war, and commanded the Soviet forces fighting in the city during the Siege of Budapest. After the end of the war in Europe, he commanded the army in the Soviet invasion of Manchuria. Postwar, Managarov held army command, but retired in the early 1950s due to his health.

== Early life, World War I, and Russian Civil War ==
A Russian, Ivan Mefodyevich Managarov was born on 12 June [O.S. 31 May] 1898 in the settlement of Yenakiyevo, Yekaterinoslav Governorate. The son of a Donbas coal miner, he worked at the Donetsk Mine No. 20 and the Yenakiyevo Metallurgical Plant after completing primary school. Joining the Imperial Russian Army during World War I in September 1914, Managarov was assigned to the 5th Reserve Cavalry Regiment at Balakleya as a ryadovoy. He was then sent to the front, serving with the mounted reconnaissance platoon of the 9th Finland Rifle Regiment of the 22nd Army Corps. Managarov was wounded and invalided out in June 1915, awarded the Cross of St. George thrice for his actions.

After the February Revolution, Managarov joined the Yenakiyevo Red Guard Detachment, formed from miners, in August 1917, and was chosen as its commander due to his combat experience. Following the transfer of the Red Guards to the Red Army in February 1918, Managarov became commander of the Proletarian Regiment of the 1st Steel Rifle Division in May of that year. The division was merged with the 1st Don Soviet Cavalry Brigade in late November to form the 1st Consolidated Cavalry Division, which was renamed the 4th Cavalry Division in March 1919. With the division, Managarov continued as commander of the Proletarian Regiment before leading the 1st Ukrainian Steel Regiment from March 1919. Further reorganization of the division left him as assistant commander of its 22nd Cavalry Regiment in May. With the 4th Cavalry Division, Managarov fought on the Southern and Southeastern Fronts at Tsaritsyn and in the Don Host Oblast.

Managarov was transferred in July 1919 to serve as assistant commander of the 2nd Taman Cavalry Regiment, which joined the 2nd Stavropol Cavalry Division in November. With the regiment, he fought on the Southern, Southeastern, and Caucasian Fronts in the operations of the 9th Army and 2nd Cavalry Corps. Becoming a cadet at the 5th Cavalry School in Taganrog in July 1920, Managarov fought in the suppression of the Revolutionary Insurrectionary Army of Ukraine with a cadet detachment.

== Interwar period ==
Upon his graduation from the cavalry school in September 1923, Managarov was appointed a platoon commander in the 21st Cavalry Regiment of the 4th Cavalry Division, now stationed in the Petrograd Military District. Transferred to serve in the same position with the 46th Cavalry Regiment of the 8th Cavalry Division of the Turkestan Front in March 1925, he fought in the suppression of the Basmachi movement. Managarov shifted to political work when he became secretary of the party bureau of the 47th Cavalry Regiment of the 11th Cavalry Division at Troitsk in April 1926, and for further political education studied at the Military-Political Academy between 1928 and 1931. Following his graduation from the academy, he was appointed political commissar of the 7th Mechanized Regiment of the 7th Cavalry Division at Minsk.

Managarov soon returned to command positions, serving as commander and commissar of the 3d Cavalry Regiment of the 1st Cavalry Division at Proskurov from 1932, and became a colonel in 1935 when the Red Army introduced personal military ranks. After a stint as a military advisor in Xinjiang from January 1936 to June 1938, he returned to the Soviet Union to command the 8th Cavalry Division of the 1st Separate Red Banner Army of the Far Eastern Front. Promoted to kombrig on 20 November 1938, he became a major general on 4 June 1940 when the army introduced general officer ranks.

== World War II ==
After Operation Barbarossa began, Managarov remained in the Far East with the division, and was appointed commander of the 26th Rifle Corps of the army in November 1941. Sent west in January 1942 to command the 16th Cavalry Corps of the front, forming in the Moscow Military District, he took command of the 7th Cavalry Corps of the Bryansk Front on 27 March. The corps spent the rear in the front reserve and in December Managarov became commander of the 41st Army, which he led in the Rzhev-Vyazma Offensive.

In March he was transferred to command the 53rd Army, which he led for most of the rest of the war in the Belgorod–Kharkov Offensive, the Uman–Botoșani Offensive, the Second Jassy–Kishinev Offensive, the Budapest Offensive, and the Prague Offensive with the 2nd Ukrainian Front. He was promoted to lieutenant general on 29 August 1943. While at the observation post of the 116th Rifle Division during fighting to the northeast of Kirovograd on 5 December, Managarov was severely wounded by a German shell that killed the army artillery commander and the chief of the operations department. After recovering, he returned to command of the army on 28 February 1944. In July, front commander Army General Rodion Malinovsky evaluated Managarov as an "observant and disciplined commander" and a "brave and decisive general with strong willpower and steady character" who showed initiative in both defensive and offensive operations, but tempered this praise with the statement that Managarov exhibited "insufficient operational thinking".

During the Siege of Budapest, Managarov succeeded to command of the Budapest Operational Group, tasked with the assault on Buda, on 22 January 1945 following the wounding of Major General Ivan Afonin. The group, which was composed of the 75th Rifle and 37th Guards Rifle Corps, captured the city in brutal street fighting by 13 February. Managarov received the title Hero of the Soviet Union and was awarded the Order of Lenin on 28 April for his "skillful command of the army" and "personal courage and heroism" in the fighting to break through German defenses in the area of Hodonín and the crossing of the Morava, being promoted to colonel general on 29 May.

After the end of the war in Europe, Managarov and the 53rd Army were relocated to the Far East to participate in the Soviet invasion of Manchuria with the Transbaikal Front. During the invasion, the army broke through the Japanese border fortifications to cross the Greater Khingan, capturing Dandong and Chaoyang.

== Postwar ==
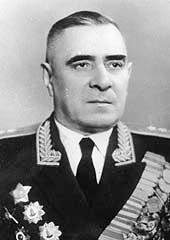
Managarov, c. 1950s

After the end of the war, Managarov was placed at the disposal of the Main Personnel Directorate when the army was disbanded in December 1945. After completing the Higher Academic Course at the Higher Military Academy between March 1946 and February 1947, he was appointed commander of the 4th Army of the Transcaucasian Military District. Relieved of command for health reasons in April 1949, Managarov was appointed commander of the Kiev Air Defense Region two months later. Retiring for health reasons on 5 September 1953, Managarov lived in Yalta, giving speeches to students and other organizations. His memoirs, focusing on the part of the 53rd Army in the Belgorod–Kharkov Offensive, were first published in 1975. Managarov died in Yalta on 27 November 1981, and was buried at the Old Cemetery of the city.

== Awards and honors ==
Managarov was a recipient of the following decorations:

- Gold Star Medal awarded to Heroes of the Soviet Union
- Order of Lenin (3)
- Order of the October Revolution
- Order of the Red Banner (3)
- Order of Suvorov, 1st class
- Order of Kutuzov, 1st class
- Order of Bogdan Khmelnitsky, 1st class
- Order of the Red Star
- Medals
- Foreign awards
- Cross of St. George, 2nd, 3rd, and 4th classes (not worn after 1917)
