= 134th Rifle Division =

134th Rifle Division (September 15, 1939 – December 27, 1941) 134th Rifle Division (January 3, 1942 – July 1945)
- Active: 1939–1945
- Country: Soviet Union
- Branch: Red Army (1939-46)
- Type: Infantry
- Size: Division
- Engagements: Operation Barbarossa; Battle of Smolensk (1941); Battle of Moscow; Battles of Rzhev; Operation Mars; Operation Büffel; Smolensk operation Polotsk-Vitebsk offensive Operation Bagration; Lublin–Brest offensive Vistula–Oder offensive Battle of Berlin
- Decorations: Order of Lenin; Order of the Red Banner; Order of Suvorov (All 2nd Formation)
- Battle honours: Verdino (2nd Formation)

Commanders
- Notable commanders: Kombrig Vladimir Kuzmich Bazarov; Col. Mikhail Arsentevich Zashibalov; Col. Pavel Nikolaevich Solovyov; Maj. Gen. Vasilii Nikitich Dalmatov; Col. Aleksandr Petrovich Kvashnin; Maj. Gen. Erofei Vladimirovich Dobrovolskii; Col. Semyon Semyonovich Chernichenko; Col. Evgenii Yakovlevich Birstein; Maj. Gen. Vladimir Nikolaevich Martsinkevich; Col. Aleksandr Gerasimovich Boytsov; Maj. Gen. Vladimir Filippovich Stenin

The 134th Rifle Division was first formed as an infantry division of the Red Army in early September 1939 in the Kharkov Military District, based on the shtat (table of organization and equipment) of September 13. At the start of the German invasion in June 1941 it was part of 19th Army, located in the Poltava Oblast, but soon began moving by rail toward Vitebsk, coming under the command of Western Front. After offloading it made several futile counterattacks but as the LVII Motorized Corps pushed north it was cut off from its Army, forced to attach itself to 22nd Army, and then became encircled in the area of Nevel. Roughly half of its personnel were able to escape, but the divisional commander was killed. The remnants of the division were moved to the reserves of the 30th Army in mid-August for rebuilding and replenishment, but were moved northwest of Bely to defend that axis when the 22nd Army was defeated near Toropets in the last days of the month. It remained in these positions through most of September, moving to the reserves of the Western Front before redeploying to the Vyazma axis, north of the Moscow-Minsk highway, just before Army Group Center began its final offensive toward Moscow. In the first days it returned to the 19th Army and held its positions until the German pincers had nearly closed when it was authorized, with its Army, to withdraw. This turned into a desperate effort to escape the encirclement, and by October 20 only a small number of personnel had managed it, too few to provide a cadre for another rebuilding, so it was disbanded in late December.

A new 134th was created in early January 1942, on the basis of a late 300-series division, largely at Solnechnogorsk in the Moscow Military District. It was soon sent west to join Kalinin Front, being briefly assigned to 4th Shock Army before being moved back to Front reserves for further training. In May it was moved to 41st Army, in the same Front, and took up positions west of Bely, where it remained until the start of Operation Mars in late November. During that offensive part of the division took part in the fighting for that fortified town, but ultimately failed at considerable cost. Bely finally fell in March 1943 when German 9th Army evacuated the Rzhev salient, and the 134th was soon transferred to 39th Army. Just prior to the start of Operation Suvorov the division staged a set-piece attack which took the village of Verdino and would later be given its name as a battle honor. During August and September it advanced with its Army into eastern Belarus but soon became engaged in the dismal fighting around Vitebsk which stretched through the winter and spring of 1944. In March it left this area for a brief period of rebuilding before being reassigned to 69th Army in 1st Belorussian Front, where it would remain for the duration. It returned to battle in July during the Lublin-Brest operation, and won the Order of the Red Banner, as did one of its regiments, shortly after advancing into Poland. Late that month it crossed the Vistula at Puławy, and fought to expand and hold this lodgement over the coming months. In January 1945 it helped break the German defenses south of Warsaw and received the Order of Suvorov as it advanced through Poland and eastern Germany to the Oder River. When the final offensive on Berlin began in April the 134th attacked from the bridgehead that had been established north of Frankfurt-on-Oder in February, and in the course of the operation played a leading role in the encirclement and elimination of 9th Army south of the city, after which it advanced to the Elbe, where it linked up with US forces. After the shooting stopped the division was given the Order of Lenin for its part in the Berlin campaign, and its subunits also received several awards, making it one of the most decorated regular rifle divisions in the Red Army. Despite this, it would be disbanded in July.

== 1st Formation ==
The first 134th Rifle Division was formed on September 15, 1939, at Kramatorsk in the Kharkov Military District, based on a cadre from the 80th Rifle Division. Kombrig Vladimir Kuzmich Bazarov was immediately assigned to command; this officer had previously led the 40th Rifle Division during the Battle of Lake Khasan. At the time of the German invasion it was part of the 25th Rifle Corps (with the 127th and 162nd Rifle Divisions) of Lt. Gen. I. S. Konev's 19th Army, moving through eastern Ukraine. Its order of battle was as follows:

- 515th Rifle Regiment
- 629th Rifle Regiment
- 738th Rifle Regiment
- 410th Artillery Regiment
- 534th Howitzer Artillery Regiment
- 235th Antitank Battalion
- 156th Antiaircraft Battalion
- 156th Reconnaissance Company
- 249th Sapper Battalion
- 229th Signal Battalion
- 231st Chemical Defense (Anti-gas) Platoon
- 103rd Motor Transport Battalion
- 225th Motorized Field Bakery
- 878th Field Postal Station
- 412th Field Office of the State Bank

19th Army was in the High Command Reserve, and was ordered north to the Vitebsk area, to join Western Front. Between July 7 and 10 the 134th offloaded north of Smolensk.

=== Battle of Vitebsk ===
By late on July 9 forces of 3rd Panzer Group had created a serious breach in the Red Army's defenses around Vitebsk. The front commander, Marshal S. K. Timoshenko, ordered Konev to counterattack to restore the situation despite the fact his Army was not yet assembled. The 134th took part in the counterattack the next day, which faltered after two days of heavy fighting due to the lack of coordination and reserves. By nightfall on July 12 both motorized corps of the Panzer Group were over the Dvina River and fanning out around Vitebsk. By the end of July 13 the 162nd and 134th were moving into the area east of Smolensk, but the remainder of 19th Army was strung out along the poor roads between that city and the area east of Vitebsk. 25th Corps was fighting in a salient east of Orsha which had been formed by XXXIX and XXXXVI Motorized Corps pushing toward Smolensk. Timoshenko continued to attempt to retake Vitebsk with counterattacks that included the 134th as late as July 16, but these made no progress at all. Adding to the turmoil, the commander of the Corps, Maj. Gen. S. M. Chestokhvalov, had been captured on July 13.

== Battle of Smolensk ==
Timoshenko was not immediately aware that Army Group Center had taken Orsha and had completed an encirclement of Western Front's forces north of the Dniepr River, east of that city and west of Smolensk. The elongated pocket contained most of 20th Army, what remained of two mechanized corps, and five divisions of 19th Army, including all of 25th Corps, for a total of 20 divisions of several types. However, the rapid advance had taken a toll of the German forces as well, with the 18th Panzer Division, as an example, holding blocking positions with only 12 operable tanks on strength. Furthermore, German infantry divisions were still well to the rear. At 2000 hours on July 18 Timoshenko issued an operational summary to the STAVKA which stated, in part, that 19th Army was "withdrawing in disorder". In the wake of the fall of Vitebsk on July 11 the 134th had joined up with 22nd Army as the 19th Panzer Division and 14th Motorized Division struck north toward Nevel and Velikiye Luki. On the night of July 19/20 the commander of that Army, Lt. Gen. F. A. Yershakov, organized a strike group that overran a sector of the overstretched 14th Motorized to escape encirclement, eventually causing 19th Panzer to withdraw from Velikiye Luki. In his report to the STAVKA early on July 21 Yershakov stated that, while the largest part of his forces had freed themselves and were regrouping, he had lost contact with Bazarov's headquarters, although two of his rifle battalions had been assigned to the Velikiye Luki garrison.

Two days later Yershakov further reported that his 62nd Rifle Corps, defending a line from Shchukino to Lake Serutskoe, had assisted elements of the 134th to escape from encirclement in the area of Prikhaby–Baranovo–Karpovo, some 20 km-25 km north of Velizh. At the same time, the German 16th Army was reporting a total of 17 Red Army divisions destroyed or dispersed, with 22,500 prisoners taken, and it began wheeling north toward Leningrad. By July 27 Yershakov had reorganized a defense along the Lovat River through Velikiye Luki to Lake Dvine, tasked with "holding on to Velikiye Luki at all costs." On the same day, Kombrig Bazarov was attempting to lead a small group out of encirclement toward the Vop River, some 50 km-60 km south of Bely, when he was killed in action. The escapees brought news of his death, and the next day Col. Mikhail Arsentevich Zashibalov was named as his replacement. This officer had been made a Hero of the Soviet Union after the Winter War where he led the 169th Rifle Regiment of the 86th Rifle Division, and soon took command of the division itself. He was in this post on June 27, 1941, when he was wounded and hospitalized, then placed at the disposal of Western Front.

=== Dukhovshchina Offensives ===
As of August 1 the remnants of the 134th were reforming under direct command of Western Front, but later that month the division was assigned to Maj. Gen. V. A. Khomenko's 30th Army. By this time Timoshenko was making plans for a new offensive in the Dukhovshchina area toward Smolensk, which would involve 30th Army, acting in the region southwest of Bely. At 0550 hours on August 16 Khomenko submitted his plan to Western Front, which included:

Reserve (one battalion of 134th RD and the tank battalions of 250th, 242nd, and 251st RDs) - concentrate in the forested region 0.5 kilometres south of Podzaitsevo by 0400 hours on 17 August and prepare to move toward Lelimovo, Sopino, and Mikhailovshchina.

Timoshenko broadly approved Khomenko's plan at noon, but among other changes ordered that the tanks remain with their divisions. In an operational summary by Western Front to the STAVKA in the evening of August 21 it was stated that the 134th was "filling out and refitting in the Vladimirovskaya region, 30 kilometres southeast of Belyi." This was expanded the next day to state that one rifle regiment was to concentrate in a forest 2 km northeast of Podzaitsevo by the end of August 22 in the reserve of 30th Army.

The STAVKA issued orders to Timoshenko at 1230 hours on August 25 to renew the offensive after early setbacks. 30th Army was to support 19th Army's attack toward Dukhovshchina and Smolensk by advancing on Tiukhovitsy (50 km north-northwest of Yartsevo), Eliseevichi, and Kholm (22 km east-northeast of Demidov). In Timoshenko's subsequent orders to Khomenko he was directed to cover the Bely axis with at least two rifle regiments of the 250th Division and attack with the remainder of his forces, less the 134th and the 107th Tank Division. These plans were partially disrupted when the XXXX Motorized Corps retook Velikiye Luki on August 25, and captured Toropets four days later. 22nd Army was thrown into disarray, although it took some time for the news to reach Moscow. Among the measures approved to support Yershakov at 2350 on August 30 the 134th was to move from the Bely area toward Nelidovo Station to secure that road hub.

During August 31 the 134th was reported as regrouping and moving into the area of Golakovo, Stodolishche, and Nelidovo area, some 45 km-55 km north-northwest of Bely, in order to protect that place from attack from Toropets. The main attack of 30th Army on September 1 utterly failed, and Khomenko no longer had his 134th and 107th Tanks available to restore his momentum. As of 0500 hours the next day the division had taken up a defense in that area, although two battalions of the 629th Rifle Regiment were holding all-round defenses closer to Bely. The remainder of the regiment handed its positions to the 250th's 922nd Rifle Regiment so as to move to the division's concentration area at Nelidovo. It was still there on September 10 when Stalin authorized Western Front to go over to the defense.

== Operation Typhoon ==
With the move to the defense the 134th left 30th Army and was moved to the reserves of Western Front, joining two other rifle divisions, three cavalry divisions, and two fortified regions. This was known as Group Boldin after its commander, Lt. Gen. I. V. Boldin. The STAVKA was convinced that a new German drive on Moscow, which was expected daily, would take place on the Vyazma axis, that is, the Warsaw–Minsk–Moscow highway. Therefore, Group Boldin was placed west of Vadino and Izdeshkovo with the intention to counterattack this direct blow along with 16th and 19th Armies. In the event the 3rd Panzer Group and 9th Army would strike at the boundary of 19th and 30th Armies, considerably farther north. 19th Army's intelligence reported that behind German lines in the Dukhovshchina area the local population was being forced to repair roads leading to the northeast, which also involved the construction of corduroy roads in swampy areas. Despite such information Western Front continued to reinforce the Vyazma axis. The 134th was redeployed from the Rzhev axis to positions southwest of Vadino Station, where it was joined by the 45th Cavalry Division on October 1. Boldin and a small staff from the Front headquarters had moved up near Vadino on September 30

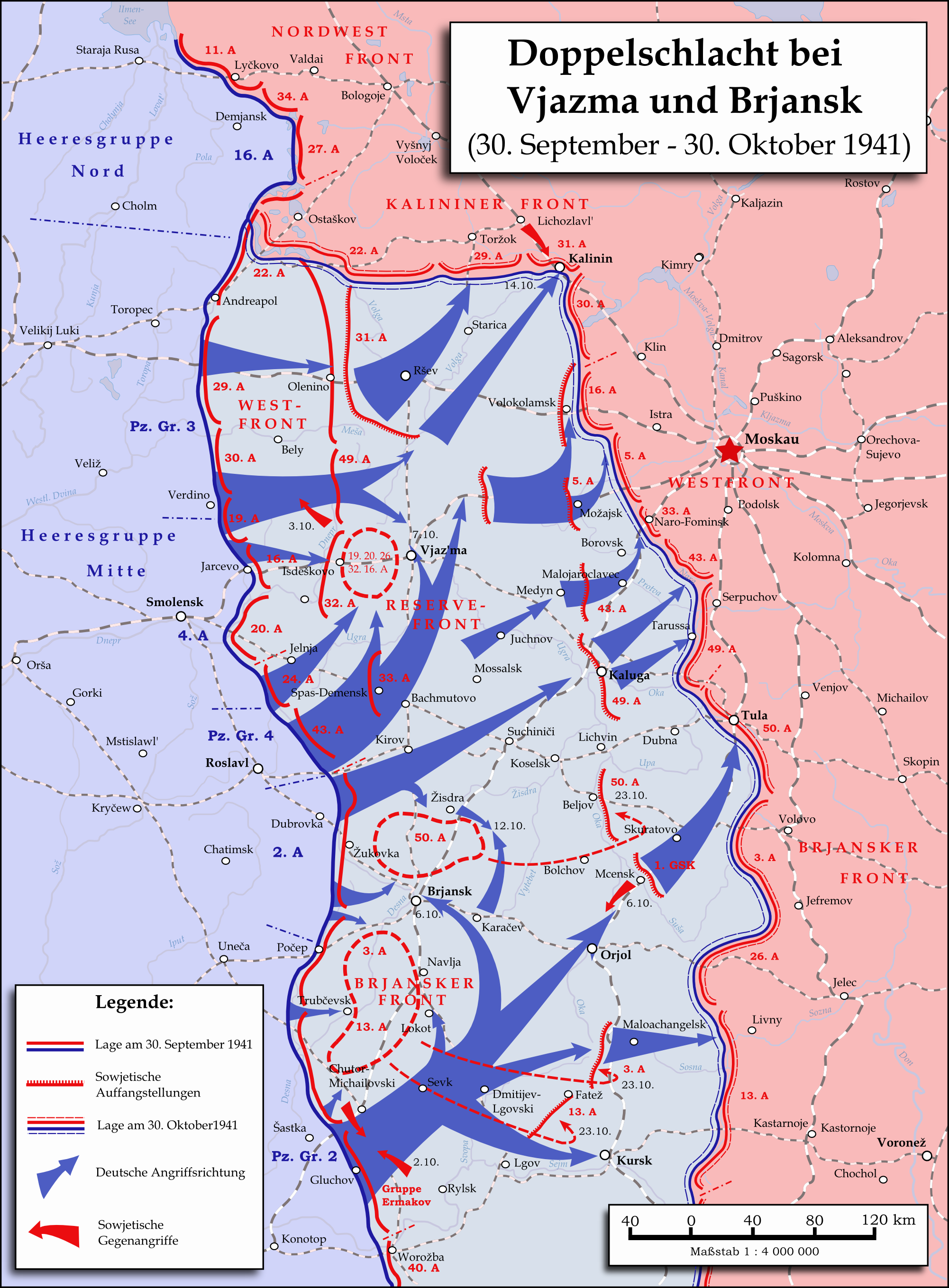
Operation Typhoon. Note initial position of 19th Army.

The northern thrust of Operation Typhoon began at 0530 hours on October 2, and the 19th/30th Army boundary was struck as General Khomenko expected. Overall, the Kaniutino axis was attacked by four German corps consisting of 12 divisions, including three panzer divisions (460–470 tanks) and one motorized division, simultaneously, and while Soviet resistance was fierce the outcome was not seriously in doubt, especially considering the continuing mild and dry weather. All this meant that Group Boldin was badly placed to intervene. General Konev, now in command of Western Front, resolved to stage a counterstroke against the penetration using Front reserves along with the 30th Army from the north and 19th Army from the south. Boldin ordered the formation of an operational group to consist of the 251st and 152nd Rifle Divisions, 45th Cavalry, 101st Motorized Division (formerly 101st Tank Division) and two tank brigades, even though the 134th was 20 km closer to the intended attack sector than the 152nd. Konev approved the plan in spite of this, because he wanted to keep the 134th on the Vyazma axis, where it had constructed a defensive line on the Vopets River north of the highway. The division was accordingly transferred to 19th Army, which was now led by Lt. Gen. M. F. Lukin. It was ordered to hold on a 15 km-wide front from Neelovo (7 km west of Vadino) to the highway. Konev had a poor understanding of the number of German tanks, believing that only 50-60 had penetrated his Front. In the event, German mobility completely disrupted Boldin's plans; by 1330 hours on October 3 the forward elements of 3rd Panzer Group were already fighting near Kaniutino Station.

Meanwhile, the 134th sustained its defense along the Vopets through October 4 and into the next day. 19th Army's left flank was being held by 45th Cavalry on the right, while the 50th Rifle Division, on the left, managed to beat back several attempts to cross the Vop River. Communications to these units were intermittent, and the heavy German pressure was leading to a shortage of ammunition, particularly to the artillery. Lukin reported to Western Front on October 6, "The forward depot of the 19th Army is completely out of ammunition. The situation is catastrophic. I request immediate resupply, especially of artillery shells." By now only 40 km-50 km separated the pincers of 3rd and 4th Panzer Groups from snapping shut east of Vyazma, and Konev was authorized by the STAVKA to begin a general retreat. According to his combat order:

Army commander Lukin is to leave strong covering units on his present front - separate regiments, which will continue to fight on the line.
The Army's main forces on the night between 5 and 6 October is to begin withdrawing to the previously prepared line of the Reserve Front along the Dnepr River in the Novo-Duginskaia - Bulanovo [likely Bulashovo] - Kaniutino... with the task to defend stubbornly the indicated line to prevent a breakthrough in the direction of Viaz'ma.

He was further directed to withdraw his artillery first. These orders were not received until 0400 hours on October 6, and the lines of retreat had already been compromised by the German advance.

=== Encirclement and breakout ===
When the retreat order was issued the 19th Army was defending a frontage that largely faced northwest. The 134th was continuing to face off against attacks along the Vopets. At 1920 Konev signaled that "The 19th Army in connection with the enemy's breakthrough toward Volochek is to fallback to the Gavrilovo - Grigor'evo line (southwest of Viaz'ma) where it is to dig in and to defend stubbornly." Group Boldin was to attack in the direction of Volochek to permit the Army's withdrawal. It wasn't until mid-morning on October 7 that Konev issued orders to the 19th and 20th Armies to "destroy the enemy in the Viaz'ma area". During that evening the two panzer groups linked up east of the city, and the encirclement was completed.

Under these circumstances the STAVKA decided to put all the encircled forces in the Vyazma area under one commander, and while Boldin was considered, Konev's choice fell on Lukin, likely due to his previous experience at Smolensk. He had already brought all his forces back over the Dniepr in preparation for a breakout, either toward Sychyovka or Gzhatsk. However, contact with Lukin was lost when his headquarters southwest of Vyazma came under attack at noon. Konev was forced to relay orders for the escape through 32nd Army, which was consolidated with 19th Army. Meanwhile, Lukin composed a report which was not received by the STAVKA until 1935 hours on October 11, in which he asked for the whereabouts of Group Boldin. He also reported that the 134th had assembled by the end of October 7 at Kholm, Edino, and Shubino. Even in these first days the enveloped troops were running low on rations, fuel, and ammunition, and the aid stations and hospitals were filled with wounded. The 134th was reported as having only about 600 riflemen remaining.

Lukin's plan for a breakout reached the STAVKA, via Konev, at 1530 hours on October 9. He reported that he had met with Boldin the previous day at Aksentevo; he also stated that he would withdraw his own forces in two groups. The 134th and 89th Rifle Divisions and 45th Cavalry, forming the right-hand group, would take a route via Lomakino, Naryshevo, Leontevo, and Novoe Selo to Meshcherskaya Station. He further stated that ammunition was down to one standard load, motor vehicles averaged about 75 percent of a fuel load, and some were out of fuel entirely. 6th and 7th Panzer Divisions, anticipating that Lukin would take the shortest path to break out, had built up defenses on the east side of the ring. As the lead elements of the Soviet columns struck these defenses and failed to penetrate, the main bodies were halted, and mostly fell apart. During October 10 and the next morning a new attack was prepared by Lukin from his command post at Zhekulino. The depleted divisions were organized with five in the first echelon and the 134th in second, behind the right flank of the 2nd Rifle Division. Its task would be to mop up German groups bypassed by the first echelon. The 45th Cavalry was intended to exploit the breakthrough. The first echelon was also to build bridges over the marshy Bebrya River to allow the passage of vehicles. Unknown to Lukin the 6th Panzer and 14th Motorized were resting in the German rear directly along the attack axis.

The start time of the attack was set for dusk, around 1600 hours. Understandably it was a failure, although some remnants of the 2nd and 91st Rifle Divisions, up to 1,800 men, managed to break through. Fighting continued through the night and into the next day. Much of the heavy equipment, unprepared to move after dark, became entangled in traffic jams. A new effort to break out to the south was soon reached. Until October 20 small groups and individuals of the 134th managed to filter out of the pocket, including Colonel Zashibalov. Although this officer remained in nominal command of the 134th he was also given command of the 60th Rifle Division on November 14. He would later serve as deputy commander of both the 63rd and 53rd Armies and would be promoted to the rank of major general on April 21, 1943. By December 27 it had been decided that the 134th was too depleted to be rebuilt, and it was officially disbanded.

== 2nd Formation ==
A new division, preliminarily numbered as the 399th, began forming at Sharya, on December 7, and at Gorki, on December 12, in the Moscow Military District. The two cadres were merged at the latter place on December 24 and began moving on December 29 to Solnechnogorsk to begin inducting the rank and file. On January 3, 1942, it was redesignated as the 134th. Col. Pavel Nikolaevich Solovyov had taken command when the division began forming, but he was replaced on January 16 by Maj. Gen. Vasilii Nikitich Dalmatov. This NKVD officer had led the 31st Army until it was destroyed in Operation Typhoon, and had then served as deputy commander of the Moscow Defence Zone. Once redesignated the division's order of battle was very similar to the 1st formation:

- 515th Rifle Regiment
- 629th Rifle Regiment
- 738th Rifle Regiment
- 410th Artillery Regiment
- 235th Antitank Battalion
- 156th Antiaircraft Battalion
- 156th Reconnaissance Company
- 249th Sapper Battalion
- 229th Signal Battalion (later 595th Signal Company)
- 435th Medical/Sanitation Battalion (later 235th)
- 491st Chemical Defense (Anti-gas) Company
- 103rd Motor Transport Company
- 408th Field Bakery
- 870th Divisional Veterinary Hospital
- 1712th Field Postal Station
- 1053rd Field Office of the State Bank

In February it began moving west into the large salient that had been formed around Toropets where it came under command of Kalinin Front, being assigned to 4th Shock Army in March. This salient formed the western face of the Rzhev salient held by German 9th Army.

The division saw its first fighting on the night of April 3/4, capturing the small settlements of Ostrov and Cherny Ruchey. On April 7–8 German counterattacks with infantry and armor, supported by air attacks, drove the 134th from these gains, although it continued to contest Cherny Ruchey through the rest of the month. By the start of May the inexperienced division returned to the Front reserves for further training, and on May 8 General Dalmatov left, soon to be made the chief of combat training for 41st Army. He would go on to command the 362nd and 307th Rifle Divisions before the war ended. He was replaced by Col. Aleksandr Petrovich Kvashnin, who had previously served as chief of staff and acting commander of the 178th Rifle Division. The 134th itself moved to 41st Army later in May.

== Operation Mars ==
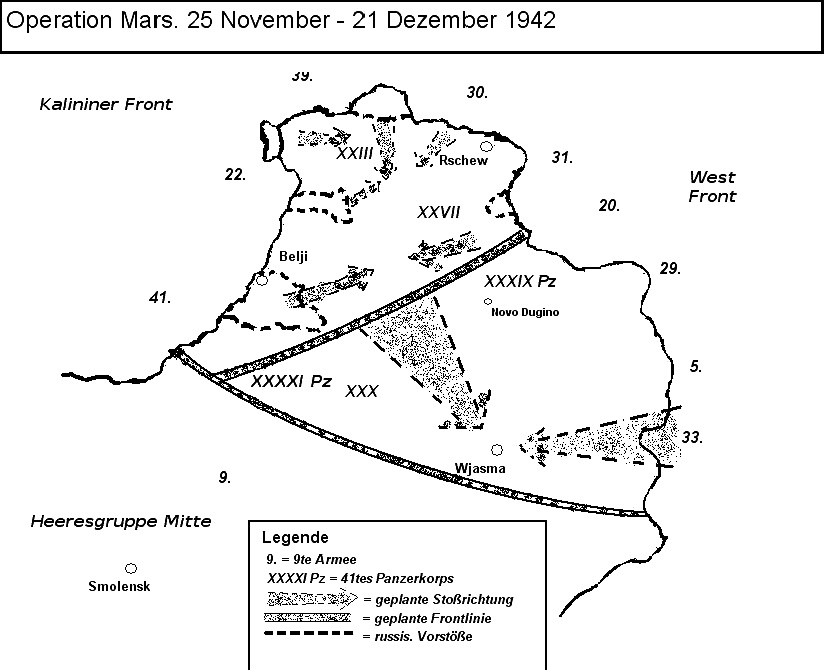
Operation Mars. Note position of 41st Army.

In Army Gen. G. K. Zhukov's plan to eliminate the Rzhev salient the 41st Army's role was to drive east towards Sychyovka to link with the forces of Western Front pushing westward. The Army's commander, Maj. Gen. G. F. Tarasov, formed his shock group from the 1st Mechanized Corps and the 6th Stalin Volunteer Siberian Rifle Corps. The 134th would initially hold the line to the north, immediately west of Bely, astride the Obsha River.

The offensive began at 0900 hours on November 25 following a powerful artillery preparation, and initially made good progress, breaking across the defensive line held by the 246th Infantry and 2nd Luftwaffe Field Divisions along the road southwest of Bely and the Vishenka River behind. The 150th Rifle Division on the left flank overcame the defenses at Klemiatino before engaging in heavy combat for Dubrovka in an effort to envelop Bely from the south. The infantry advance in the center and right, where two regiments of 2nd Luftwaffe had been smashed, had created conditions for the commitment of 1st Mechanized the next day. This proved partly successful, although the objective of the Nacha River was not reached, but the 150th, reinforced with elements of 219th Tank and 19th Mechanized Brigades, was stymied in the fighting for the village of Baturino, and had furthermore lost nearly half its original strength. Late in the day, Tarasov directed Colonel Kvashnin to commit one rifle regiment to the support of the 150th; the 91st Rifle Brigade would form the second echelon of a renewed attack on Baturino. Meanwhile, news was arriving that 20th Army, on the opposite side of the salient, was making little progress.

=== Battle for Bely ===
The battle for Bely resumed at dawn on November 27, but now the German forces took the initiative. At 1215 hours three battalions of Großdeutschland Division struck the left flank of the 150th at two small villages 1,000m north of Dubrovka and took them, while a fourth battalion seized Morozovo at 1300. Unknown to the German commander the 150th had been massing its remaining strength for its own assault, which turned into a heavy counterattack, backed by powerful artillery and Katyusha fire. This forced Großdeutschland back to its jumping-off positions, for an overall stalemate, although at heavy cost to both sides. In contrast, 1st Mechanized continued to make good progress. The next day the 47th Mechanized Brigade found a gap between the Bely grouping and 1st Panzer Division and drove north to the Obsha south of Egore, enveloping "Fortress" Bely from three sides.

On the morning of November 29 Tarasov was optimistic that the 47th Mechanized would be able to drive deeper into the German rear and loosen their hold on Bely. In fact, the Brigade would soon cut the last lines of land communications with the "Fortress". However, the 47th was unsupported, as Tarasov attempted to push into the town from the east. Meanwhile, the 134th was committed into an attack from the south alongside the 150th Division. The latter captured Motshchalniki but then lost it to a counterattack. Tarasov was convinced that Bely would fall the next day, after which he would be able to reinforce 1st Mechanized, whose advance had stalled along the Nacha; he was unaware that the 12th Panzer Division was approaching the battlefield. Early on November 30, in heavy snowfall, the 91st Rifle and 19th Mechanized brigades, plus a regiment of the 150th, massed for an attack toward the position of the headquarters of 1st Panzer, which broke down under heavy fire after initial successes. 41st Army's forces around Bely were effectively spent. Meanwhile, the 47th Mechanized, without reinforcements, took up a semi-circular defense some 6 km south of the Bely–Vladimirskoe road. During the day five Ju 52 transports managed to drop supplies to the Bely garrison, despite winter weather and Soviet fighters.

On December 1, Tarasov directed another regiment of the 134th to join 6th Rifle Corps in attacking Bely from the south along the Bely–Demiakhi road. When this failed, the Army commander ordered the assaults to continue over the next two days, with the support of increasingly heavy artillery fire and air attacks by Il-2 bombers. On December 4 a small penetration was opened at Chirevo and Popovka, only to be closed again by counterattacks. All through this time the 47th Mechanized continued to hold out, but was in obvious danger of encirclement. By this time it was clear that Operation Mars had failed nearly everywhere, and only Zhukov's stubbornness sustained the fighting, although 41st Army, as one example, was still lodged deep in the German positions. On December 8 the STAVKA directed that "Belyi is to be taken no later than 20 December." However, Tarasov was already reporting a German counteroffensive in the Bely area that was threatening 6th Rifle and 1st Mechanized Corps with encirclement. Zhukov flew to Tarasov's headquarters the next morning.

Despite the ominous intelligence, Tarasov had renewed his attacks against Bely on December 7, rather than going over to the defense. 47th Mechanized had already been encircled, and now the recently arrived 19th Panzer Division and 1st SS Cavalry Division began a northward drive east of the Bely–Demiakhi road through the 78th Rifle Brigade toward Bely. By 1215 hours on December 8 the 1st Mechanized was encircled as well, in part due to the Bely garrison, with all available reserves, pushing south through surprised Soviet troops. During December 11–16 the Corps, and its attached rifle brigades, fought to escape, with mixed results. In an after-action report toward the end of the month the 1st Panzer Division stated that, among other Red Army units, "part of the 134th Rifle Division" had been destroyed. Despite this, and the overall failure of the offensive, on December 21 Colonel Kvashnin was given command of the 17th Guards Rifle Division, which he would lead into the postwar, being promoted to the rank of major general on January 23, 1943, and becoming a Hero of the Soviet Union on April 19, 1945. Maj. Gen. Erofei Vladimirovich Dobrovolskii took over the 134th on December 26; he had previously led the 17th Guards.

=== Rzhev-Vyazma Offensive ===
After the German disaster at Stalingrad it was clear that 9th Army could not continue to hold the Rzhev salient, and Hitler finally agreed to this on February 6, 1943. By mid-month preparations for a scorched-earth withdrawal were well underway, including completion of new defenses at the base of the salient. At noon on February 20 the central church in Bely, which contained an artillery observation post, was blown up. Excess ammunition was being expended; on February 24 the combat positions of the 134th were struck by 1,800 artillery shells and mortar rounds. The withdrawal began on March 1, but it was some 24 hours later before the Soviet command became fully aware of it. Bely was finally liberated on March 10. The arrival of the rasputitsa hampered mobility for both sides but by March 22 a total of 17 German divisions had reached the line from Dukhovshchina through Dorogobuzh to Spas-Demensk. Two days later Kalinin Front went over to the defense. By the end of the month the 134th had been transferred to 39th Army, still in Kalinin Front.

== Into Western Russia and Belarus ==
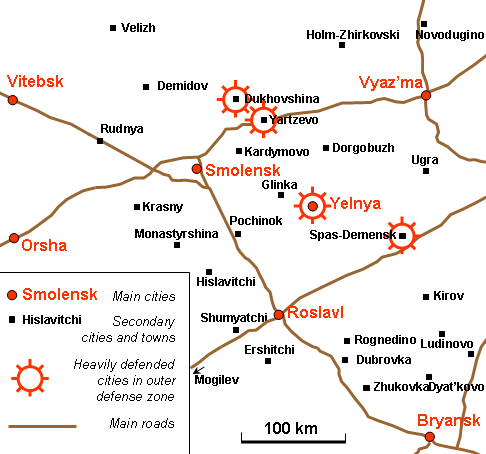
General layout of the Smolensk region during the battle. Note location of Dukhovshchina.

The division remained in much the same positions at the base of the former salient during the operational pause in the spring and early summer of the year. Just prior to the start of the summer offensive the division joined the 84th Rifle Corps, still in 39th Army, along with the 158th and 234th Rifle Divisions. The Corps was commanded by Lt. Gen. S. A. Knyazkov. In a preliminary operation on July 30 the division captured the village of Verdino, and on September 19 it would receive this name as a battle honor.

Operation Suvorov began on August 7, but Kalinin Front's part in it, in the direction of Dukhovshchina, was limited to diversionary activity until August 13. It began its main attack at 0730 hours, attacking XXVII Army Corps 8 km northeast of Dukhovshchina, led by five divisions of 83rd Rifle Corps and 2nd Guards Rifle Corps, backed by two tank brigades, two tank regiments, and two sapper brigades. 43rd Army provided support on the right. XXVII Corps was assigned a 40 km-wide front held by three divisions and a fourth in reserve. All of these were at roughly half their authorized strength, but their Barbarossa-Stellung line consisted of three full lines of trenches sited on heavily wooded high ground.

=== Operation Suvorov ===
The ammunition supply limited the Front commander, Col. Gen. A. I. Yeryomenko, to a 35-minute artillery preparation, which mostly failed to suppress the defenses. In the first hours, 2nd Guards Corps was able to penetrate the first trench line south of Spas-Ugly and overrun a German battalion. But overall the Army's shock groups gained at most 1,500m before being halted by counterattacks. PaK 40 antitank guns destroyed or disabled 45 of the supporting tanks in the first two days of battle. On the second day, heavy air attacks disrupted several of 39th Army's formations, and ground reinforcements began arriving, including a battalion of Nashorn tank destroyers. Finally, the 25th Panzergrenadier Division arrived, which allowed XXVII Corps to stabilize its line. 39th Army gained about 3 km of ground in four days of heavy fighting, at substantial cost, without reaching any objectives. Kalinin Front had taken some 10,000 casualties to this point, but German casualties had also been heavy, especially to the infantry. On August 21 the overall offensive by both Western and Kalinin Fronts was suspended due to losses, supply shortages, and a period of rainy weather. The 18th Panzer Division was transferred to backstop XXVII Corps, but it had only 1,200 infantry and 13 tanks.

Kalinin Front resumed the offensive on August 25. 39th Army was reinforced with the 5th Guards Rifle Corps, but this force was only able to advance 1,000m on a 3 km front in five days of fighting. Yeryomenko was stymied. He wrote in his memoirs:

I was seriously worried that the offensive was fading, and the task was not completed, although we did not lack people. The main cause of our failure was the inability of the artillery to destroy the enemy's strongly fortified positions. The essence of the matter was not in the number of barrels of artillery, but in the number of shells.

Despite this, he was ordered to go on attacking. While Western Front made more substantial gains, Suvorov was again suspended on September 7.

When it resumed on September 14, XXVII Corps was attempting to hold a sector 81 km-wide with five divisions containing just 10,000 troops in total. The Corps commander expected the main thrust to come from east of Dukhovshchina, where he deployed the 25th Panzergrenadiers backed by 1st SS Infantry Brigade. Yeryomenko shook up his command, in part by replacing the commander of 39th Army, Lt. Gen. A. I. Zygin, with Lt. Gen. N. E. Berzarin. Having learned of the arrival of 1st SS he briefly shifted his main effort to his 43rd Army to the northwest, where the German lines were even more thinly held, and scored a minor success. After a 20-minute artillery preparation the 39th Army struck near Spas-Ugly with four divisions and smashed a German regiment, breaching the line. By 1000 hours the conditions were favorable for Yeryomenko to commit his mobile forces, which collapsed and routed what remained of 52nd Infantry Division. With Soviet armor roaming in its rear the XXVII Corps was forced to commit the weak 18th Panzer, which simply didn't have the strength to deal with the crisis.

On September 15, Berzarin expanded his penetration and mopped up bypassed pockets. After hanging on as long as possible XXVII Corps began to retreat to the Hubertus-I-Stellung to the rear. As front-line resistance evaporated the two Armies of Kalinin Front took up the pursuit. The following morning the 2nd Guards Corps met 84th Corps at Klevtsi, 11 km north of Dukhovshchina, but they failed to trap the 197th Infantry Division. 2nd Guards Corps and the Dremov mobile group now pushed south toward Dukhovshchina against weak rearguards. It was now clear that Hubertus-I was untenable, and the town was evacuated overnight on September 16/17. Smolensk was liberated by units of Western Front on September 25, as Army Group Center fell back to the promised refuge of the Panther Line behind the Dniepr River. On September 28 General Dobrovolskii left the division, soon to take up command of 84th Corps. He later led the 16th Rifle Corps and would be made a Hero of the Soviet Union on April 6, 1945, after which he spent a year as commandant of Dresden. He was replaced by Col. Semyon Semyonovich Chernichenko.

=== Vitebsk Offensive ===
By the beginning of October 39 Army, still in Kalinin (as of October 20 1st Baltic) Front, was located south of Velizh and was facing elements of VI Army Corps of 3rd Panzer Army. Following the liberation of Smolensk the next obvious objective was the Belarusian city of Vitebsk, which was intended to be taken by October 10. General Berzarin was to conduct the Front's main attack through Rudnya and Lyozna. He chose to deploy his 84th and 5th Guards Corps, backed by a small mobile group, along the Smolensk–Vitebsk highway; the 84th's four divisions (219th, 184th, 158th, and 134th) were backed by the 46th Mechanized Brigade and the 158th was in second echelon. Rudnya was liberated by 5th Guards Corps on September 29 and on October 3 the 134th and 184th Divisions breached the defenses northeast of Mikulino, forcing a German withdrawal on October 6 to new positions north and south of Lyozna. In heavy fighting through October 7–8 the 84th Corps cleared the town with help from the mobile group. The remaining defenders fell back to a new line 10 km to the west late on October 9, which was reached by the pursuit on the 12th. Given the attrition suffered in the nine previous days the offensive was paused for regrouping.

39th and 43rd Armies renewed the offensive on October 15 with a series of local attacks. 158th, 32nd, and 184th Divisions struck the 246th Infantry Division (LIII Army Corps) west of Lyozna without any success. Further efforts by both 84th and 5th Guards Corps on October 18 yielded the same lack of results. Yeryomenko stated in a telegram to the STAVKA on October 19:

The Kalinin Front's formations and units have been significantly exhausted during the course of over two or more months of uninterrupted combat. The rifle divisions have 3,500 to 4,500 men each. Such a situation has had a telling effect on the nature and results of the recent combat... Therefore I request that you permit the Kalinin Front's force to pause for 10-12 days...

Nevertheless, the STAVKA would continue to try to crack the Vitebsk defenses.

=== Polotsk-Vitebsk Offensive ===
The 1st and 2nd Baltic Fronts began new operations in early November; the objective for 1st Baltic was first to take Vitebsk and then to advance toward Polotsk. 39th and 43rd Armies were positioned primarily to the north of the Smolensk–Vitebsk railroad and highway against the defending VI Army Corps. When the assault began on November 8 the 39th Army had the 84th and the 5th Guards Corps deployed abreast, supported by a composite mobile corps made up of three mechanized and tank brigades under command of Colonel Dremov. Despite the attacking forces being eroded to about half their authorized strengths they still enjoyed a fivefold superiority in infantry and an absolute superiority in armor and artillery. On the first day the 184th Division and 124th Rifle Brigade were repulsed by the 246th Infantry Division, but this was intended as a diversion. The next morning the Army's main forces attacked and ripped through the defenses of the 206th Infantry Division just north of the highway.

This joint assault on November 9 by the 39th and 43rd Armies breached the German line along a 10 km-wide front and by evening the lead elements of the attacking force had reached Poddube, just 10 km east of the defense lines around Vitebsk proper. The 206th Infantry's front was a shambles by nightfall and the 14th Infantry Division's right flank was both turned and wide open. While the 43rd Army's advance was largely contained at Poddube on November 11 the 39th managed to continue another 5 km along the highway as far as Karamidy and the banks of the Losonina River, 10 km east of Vitebsk. General Berzarin now committed the Dremov Group to combat which led to a complex battle with elements of the 18th Panzer Division and battlegroups of the 206th and 246th Infantry. By November 17 the German forces were able to restore a fairly continuous front and the Soviet assault expired in exhaustion.

=== Vitebsk (Gorodok) Offensive ===
On December 8 the STAVKA directed the new commander of 1st Baltic Front, Army Gen. I. K. Bagramyan, to go over to the defense so his armies could regroup and refit prior to another offensive to take Vitebsk as well as the town of Haradok to the north. The forces of his Front, including the 134th, were by now seriously under strength from near-continuous fighting since early October. The new offensive on Vitebsk would also involve the 33rd Army of Western Front and would begin on December 19. At the start of the offensive the combined forces of 43rd and 39th Armies struck the defenses of 14th Infantry Division. According to German records eight rifle divisions, one rifle brigade and two tank units participated in the initial assault on a 16 km-wide sector from Borok northeast to Kasenki, south of the Vitebsk–Surazh road. General Berzarin had deployed his 5th Guards and 1st Rifle Corps, soon reinforced with 84th Corps and several separate formations, on the Borok–Goriane sector. Overall the two armies drove the defenders back up to 3 km on an 8 km-wide front by day's end on December 19 and almost reached the Vitebsk–Surazh road. The next day the second echelon divisions were committed to develop the attack; these gained another 2 km in heavy fighting but were still unable to cross the road. The 14th Infantry committed all its reserves and was reinforced with one regiment of the 197th Infantry transferred from the Orsha sector. The battle raged until December 23 by which time the Soviet forces had reached the road on a 10 km sector from Piatiletna to Kasenki. On the same day Colonel Chernichenko left the 134th, being replaced by Col. Sevastyan Yakovlevich Yakovlenko.

The offensive was renewed on January 8. 5th Guards Corps formed 39th Army's shock group on a 6 km-wide sector between the Smolensk–Vitebsk road and the village of Vaskova, again facing the 206th Infantry Division. 84th Corps was on its right, with the 134th in its first echelon. By now these divisions were at less than 40 percent of authorized strength. Although the German forces were similarly weakened, 5th Guards Corps' attack floundered after an advance of only about 1000m. Although the 33rd and 5th Armies to the south made greater progress, it was at a heavy cost, and the offensive was finally shut down late in the month.

==== Fourth and Fifth Vitebsk Offensives ====
Later in January the 134th, along with its Corps and Army, was transferred to Western Front, which was commanded by Army Gen. V. D. Sokolovskii. The STAVKA now ordered the Front to change the axis of its attacks northward toward Vitebsk itself. Berzarin once again would attack along and south of the Smolensk–Vitebsk road against the 206th Infantry. He chose to configure his Army with 84th Corps in first echelon and 5th Guards Corps in second. The 84th would continue to guard the sector north from the highway to Poddube with the 262nd Rifle Division while the 134th and 158th Divisions would attack west to Ugliane with 28th Tank Brigade in support and 32nd Rifle Division in second echelon; this objective was just 12 km southeast of the center of Vitebsk. The offensive began with an intense artillery preparation at dawn on February 3, but this failed to silence many German strongpoints, artillery and mortar positions. The 158th and 134th made scarcely a dent on the 206th and they soon fell back to their start lines with heavy losses. While this effort was suspended the 33rd Army had greater success and the offensive continued for five more days, bending but not breaking the defense. On February 9 Colonel Yakovlenko was replaced by Col. Evgenii Yakovlevich Birstein, who had been in command of the 738th Rifle Regiment since June 1942.

Yet another attempt to take the city was set to begin on February 29. By this time the 134th and 158th were facing the 246th Infantry in the Babinichi area, while the 262nd and the 5th Guards Corps opposed the 206th. 33rd Army would again carry the main weight; once it took Astrowna most of 39th Army were to attack from the Poddube region. Just as this was to begin the commander of 3rd Panzer Army, Col. Gen. G.-H. Reinhardt, disrupted the entire plan by shortening his defensive line around Vitebsk. The 246th and 206th pulled back to a new line from Avdeevichi on the Dvina south across the Smolensk–Vitebsk road to Shelegova and allowed the creation of reserves. From the perspective of Sokolovskii the entire plan for 39th Army was compromised. The offensive went ahead with mixed results but this marked its culmination, as the spring mud began to set in. Western Front had lost 2,650 killed and 9,205 wounded in this latest attack, as well as most of its remaining tanks.

On March 28 the 134th was withdrawn to the Reserve of the Supreme High Command for a much-needed period of rest and replenishment, moving to the vicinity of Kovel. On April 10 Colonel Birstein was wounded and hospitalized, and a week later was replaced by Col. Dmitrii Vasilevich Gruzdev, the divisional chief of staff, who in turn was replaced on April 23 by Maj. Gen. Vladimir Nikolaevich Martsinkevich. This officer had begun the war in command of the 176th Rifle Division and had briefly led both the 24th and 9th Armies in 1942 before taking command of the 229th Rifle Division and then spending nine months in studies at the Military Academy of the High Command. The 134th had returned to the active front on April 16, now as part of the 61st Rifle Corps of 1st Belorussian Front's 69th Army. It would remain under these commands for the duration of the war.

== Operation Bagration ==
At the start of the summer offensive the 61st Corps had the 134th, 247th and 274th Rifle Divisions under command. 69th Army, now under command of Lt. Gen. V. Ya. Kolpakchi, was one of three armies on the left flank of the Front south of the Pripyat River that remained on the defense during the first weeks of the offensive. It was intended that they would enter the fighting as it developed to the west.

=== Lublin-Brest Offensive ===
When the left wing went over to the offensive it was ordered to be ready to attack in the direction of Siedlce and Lublin, and with part of its forces to capture Brest in cooperation with the Front's right-wing forces. The attack was first scheduled for July 15 and then for July 17. One of the first objectives taken, on July 22, was the Polish town of Chełm, and on August 9, unusually, both the 134th as a whole and its 738th Rifle Regiment would receive the Order of the Red Banner. On July 28 forces of the 28th, 61st and 70th Armies captured the town and fortress of Brest after heavy fighting. This allowed the Front commander, Marshal K. K. Rokossovskii, to direct his main forces along the Warsaw axis, where German resistance was increasing daily. 69th Army seized a bridgehead over the Vistula in the Puławy area at the end of the month, and was engaged in heavy fighting to expand it.

During this fighting, on July 30, General Martsinkevich was mortally wounded while overseeing the crossing of the 629th Rifle Regiment. This had begun at 0500 hours the previous day and the entire 1st Battalion had got over by 0700 without losses, then advanced a short distance against stiff resistance. The 2nd Battalion began its crossing at 1000 but this was interrupted by heavy air attacks, postponing the operation until after dark. The 1st Battalion was able to fend off nine counterattacks without reinforcements. In mid-morning the bombing by Ju 87 and Ju 88 aircraft continued on both sides of the river and in one attack Martsinkevich was stricken. He was buried in a mass grave in Lutsk, and on April 6, 1945, he was posthumously made a Hero of the Soviet Union.

The next day, Col. Aleksandr Gerasimovich Boytsov took over the division. This officer had been made a Hero of the Soviet Union on January 15 for his leadership of the 77th Guards Rifle Division's 218th Guards Rifle Regiment in the crossing of the Dniepr. He had subsequently served as the division's deputy commander. On December 30 he left the 134th to further his military education and was replaced by Maj. Gen. Vladimir Filippovich Stenin. This officer had begun the war in temporary command of the 69th Motorized Division and had since held a wide variety of divisional commands and staff positions, most recently leading the 4th Rifle Division. He would lead the 134th until it disbanded, and would be made a Hero of the Soviet Union on April 6, 1945.

== Into Germany ==
At the start of the new offensive on January 14, 1945, the Puławy bridgehead contained 69th and 33rd Armies, which were to attack along a 13 km sector in the direction of Radom, and then towards Łódź. 69th Army had the 11th Tank Corps as its mobile group. The assault quickly overcame the defenders, and Radom was liberated on January 16, while flanking forces of the 69th assisted in the clearing of the greater Warsaw area. On February 19 the 134th would be awarded the Order of Suvorov, 2nd Degree, for its part in the fighting south of Warsaw.

=== Battle of Berlin ===
As the division closed on the Oder River it entered the historic province of Brandenburg and, in recognition of their roles in the fighting there, on April 5 the 738th Rifle Regiment won its second Order of the Red Banner, the 235th Antitank Battalion received the same decoration, and 629th Rifle Regiment was awarded the Order of Suvorov, 3rd Degree. The 515th Rifle Regiment and the 410th Artillery Regiment were both awarded "Brandenburg" as a battle honor at about this time according to Prikaz No. 058.

At the start of the Berlin operation the 69th Army was deployed along the east bank of the Oder, as well as in the bridgehead north of Frankfurt-on-Oder, on an 18 km front. Its main attack was to take place from this bridgehead along a 6 km attack sector using six rifle divisions in a single echelon. 61st Corps had all four of its divisions (it now also contained the 41st Rifle Division) in the bridgehead on this main attack axis. The 41st, 247th and 274th were in first echelon with the 134th in second. The Army's task was to break through the German defense on a sector from Height 63.0 (2 km north of Lebus) to Wuste Kunersdorf and by the end of the first day capture a line from Leizen to Treplin. It was to simultaneously launch an auxiliary attack on Bossen, in order to outflank Frankfurt-on-Oder from the northwest. Subsequently, it was to attack in the general direction of Trebus–Werlsee–Dahlem and to capture the southeastern and southern parts of Berlin on the operation's sixth day and reach the southeastern bank of Lake Havel.

Marshal Zhukov, who was now in command of 1st Belorussian Front, chose to launch his part of the offensive with a night attack very early on April 16. For the first time in a mass effort it was planned to employ anti-aircraft searchlights to blind the enemy and illuminate the terrain; 36 were deployed on 69th Army's front. The Army attacked at 0530 hours, following a 10-minute artillery preparation. Having advanced 2–4 km in conditions of fierce fighting with numerous German strongpoints and, having beaten off a series of counterattacks, the Army's forces broke through the main defensive zone in the Lebus highway–Schoenfliess station area and by the end of the day had reached the line Podelzig–Malnow–Schoenfliess–Wuste Kunersdorf and reached the second defensive zone.

On the second day, following a 30-minute artillery preparation, the Army resumed the offensive at 1030 hours, cleared Malnow, and advanced 1–2 km along certain axes. During April 18 the 69th carried out a partial regrouping on its right flank in order to take advantage of the success of the adjacent 8th Guards Army and resumed its attack at 1230, following a 30-minute preparation supported by 16th Air Army, which struck the German strongpoint at Altzeschdorf. The German forces put up fierce resistance, including 14 counterattacks. By the end of the day the 61st Corps, which was attacking along the Army's center, had advanced 1,000m and was fighting in the second defensive zone in the eastern part of Neider-Esar. It resumed this assault the next day and in cooperation with 25th Rifle Corps took this place as well as Alt Malisch, breaking through the second zone and reaching the line Alt Malisch–Height 62.0.

==== Encirclement of 9th Army ====
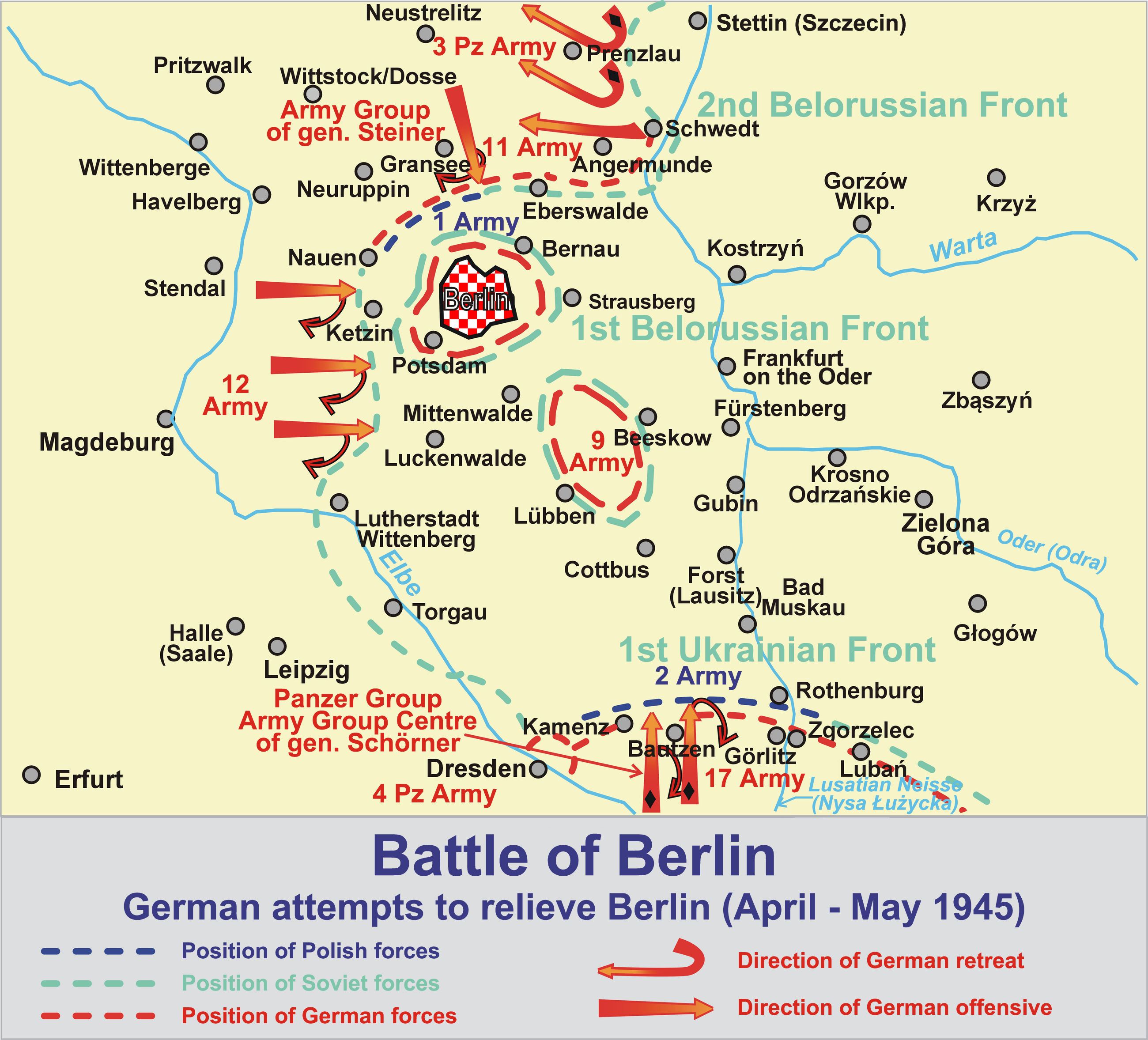
Battle of Berlin, around April 26. Note encircled 9th Army.

On April 20 the 69th advanced its right flank by 10 km, breaking through the German first intermediate position and by the day's end had reached the line of the Krummer See–the Burgsee–the northern outskirts of Wulkow having turned its front to the southwest and south. The next day the pace accelerated and the Army advanced its right flank 20 km to the west, broke through the third defensive zone in the Buchholz area and by the end of the day was fighting along the line Enkendorf–Buchholz–Arensdorf–Wulkow, with its front facing south along an extended 40 km front. Zhukov ordered Kolpakchi to resume the offensive in the direction of Fürstenwalde and Bad Saarow from the morning of April 22. The Army's right flank advanced to the south, gaining 7 km in heavy fighting, took Fürstenwalde, and reached the Spree River in this area. 69th Army was now threatening the path of retreat of German 9th Army which was falling back from its positions on the Oder south of Frankfurt. During the day about 30,000 shells and mortar rounds were fired against 69th Army's positions.

Kolpakchi was now tasked with preventing the withdrawal of this German force to the west and northwest by continuing to press southward to occupy a line from the Scharmützelsee to Bad Saarow to Kechendorf. On April 23 the 69th and 33rd Armies, the newly committed 3rd Army, and the 2nd Guards Cavalry Corps, advanced to isolate the 9th Army from Berlin. The 69th ran into stubborn resistance and made only minor gains. The following day the Army's orders remained as previous. After beating off eight counterattacks up to a battalion in strength supported by tanks it advanced 3–6 km and reached the line Reichenwalde–Petersdorf–Kersdorf. By day's end only a 10 km gap remained in the encirclement of 9th Army. Throughout April 25 69th Army's forces continued fighting along its previous line against desperate resistance, but the encirclement was completed on other sectors.

At 1600 hours that day Zhukov ordered the 69th, 33rd and 3rd Armies, plus 2nd Guards Cavalry to continue attacking to destroy the encircled grouping, in conjunction with 1st Ukrainian Front, by breaking it up into several isolated pockets. 69th Army was to strike with its right flank in the direction of Riplos, Hersdorf and Streganz and then, depending on the situation, attack to the south or southeast. By the end of April 26 the Army was fighting along the line Klein Eichholtz–Storkow–Kablow, having advanced 15 km during the day. The following day it was engaged in heavy fighting with German detachments covering the defiles between the lakes, but still advanced 6 km along its left flank. During April 28 the 69th Army attacked to the southwest along both banks of the Schweriner See, pushing aside covering units, and advanced up to 6 km. The next day the 9th Army resumed its attempts to break out of the encirclement, leading to furious fighting. By the end of the day the combined forces of 69th, 33rd and 3rd Armies had almost eliminated that part of the German grouping covering the main forces' breakthrough, and the main force had been broken into three distinct pockets. One pocket was in the Wendisch-Bucholtz area; during April 30 the combined Soviet armies completed its liquidation by 1700 hours, and the remainder of 9th Army was eliminated on May 1.

From May 3–8 the 69th Army advanced to the Elbe River, eliminating small strongpoints and German covering groups as it went. It reached the river on the sector from Burg to Schönebeck, where on May 5 it established contact with the American 83rd Infantry Division.

== Postwar ==
On May 28, in recognition of its contribution to the Berlin campaign, the 134th received the unusual award of the Order of Lenin. Further decorations followed on June 11, tied to the elimination of 9th Army:

- 515th Rifle Regiment - Order of the Red Banner
- 629th Rifle Regiment - Order of the Red Banner
- 738th Rifle Regiment - Order of Suvorov, 3rd Degree
- 410th Artillery Regiment - Order of Kutuzov, 3rd Degree
- 235th Antitank Battalion - Order of Bogdan Khemelnitsky, 3rd Degree
- 249th Sapper Battalion - Order of the Red Star

According to STAVKA Order No. 11095 of May 29, part 6, the 134th was listed as one of those divisions to be "disbanded in place". In accordance with this directive the division was disbanded in July. General Stenin was moved to command of the 89th Rifle Division, which was converted to the 23rd Guards Mechanized Division, before becoming commandant of the Saratovsk Infantry School until his retirement in October 1951.

== In popular culture ==
Lt. Vladimir Vasilyevich Karpov served as commander of a reconnaissance platoon of the 629th Rifle Regiment. In preparation for Operation Bagration he infiltrated into Vitebsk in order to gather intelligence from local partisans. For this feat he was made a Hero of the Soviet Union. He went on to a postwar career as a prolific author, as well as a magazine editor, and was the final secretary of the Union of Soviet Writers.
