= Iosif Popov =

Soviet Army general (1898–1962)

Iosif Ivanovich Popov
- Popov, c. 1945
- Born: 15 September 1898; Rylsk, Kursk Governorate, Russian Empire
- Died: 6 December 1962 (aged 64) Leningrad, Soviet Union
- Allegiance: Russian Empire; Russian SFSR; Soviet Union
- Branch: Imperial Russian Army; Red Army (later Soviet Army)
- Service years: 1917, 1918–1958
- Rank: Major general
- Commands: 135th Rifle Division; 279th Rifle Division; 33rd Guards Rifle Corps; 94th Rifle Corps; 59th Rifle Corps
- Conflicts: World War I; Russian Civil War; Polish–Soviet War; World War II
- Awards: Order of Lenin (2); Order of the Red Banner (6); Order of Kutuzov, 2nd class

Iosif Ivanovich Popov (Russian: Ио́сиф Ива́нович Попо́в; 15 September 1898 – 6 December 1962) was a Soviet Army major general who held corps command during World War II.

== Early life, World War I, and Russian Civil War ==
Iosif Ivanovich Popov was born on 15 September 1898 in Rylsk, Kursk Governorate. From May to September 1917 he served in the Russian Army as assistant commander of a Don Cossack marching sotnya under the staging commandant of Stolbtsy station. During the Russian Civil War, Popov served with the Kursk Red Guard Detachment from December 1917, then commanded the Kursk-Lgov sector partisan detachment in battles against German troops in the region of Lgov, Rylsk, Sudzha, Korenevo, and Vorozhba. In February 1918, he was integrated into the Red Army as commander of the 3rd Kursk infantry Regiment at Lgov. Popov became a battalion commander in the 5th Kursk Regiment in May of that year and from July commanded the 1st Rifle Regiment, then the 4th Novo-Khopyorsk Regiment of the 2nd Kursk Rifle Division.

From April 1919 he served as officer for special assignments under the 9th Army commander. With these units he fought on the Southern Front against the Don Army and the Armed Forces of South Russia in the region of Povorino, Novocherkassk, Borisoglebsk, Verkhne-Chirsky, and Konstantinovskaya. From April to August 1920, Popov commanded the separate cavalry brigade of the Consolidated Division of P.A. Solodukhin, which became the 47th Cavalry Regiment of the 47th Rifle Division. He led it in the Polish–Soviet War in the region of fortified points of Vinnytsia, Gaysin, Letichev, Voronovitsy, Dashkovtsy and others. From September he commanded the 14th Reserve Cavalry Battalion under the Formation Directorate of the 14th Army. From April 1921 he commanded the 1st Cavalry Regiment of the Brigade of G.I. Kotovsky, fighting in the suppression of the Tambov Rebellion and then in battles against the armed forces of Yuriy Tyutyunnyk in Ukraine. Twice wounded during the war, Popov was awarded the Order of the Red Banner twice (in 1923 and 1924) for his "courage and heroism".

== Interwar period ==
From December 1922, Popov commanded the 2nd Brigade of Poor Peasants of Ukraine of the 4th, then the 3rd Cavalry Division. From October 1924 to August 1925 he completed the Red Army Higher Officers Improvement Course, then was appointed commander of the 3rd Brigade of the 8th Gomel (renamed the 8th Orenburg) Territorial Cavalry Division. From September 1926 he served as military instructor of the Kiev Veterinary and Zootechnical Institute and then the Kiev Polytechnical Institute. He graduated from the Frunze Military Academy in 1931 and from December 1932 served as an instructor at the Kuybyshev Military Engineering Academy, as a head of tactics and senior head of the operational tactical cycle of the operational art department, and senior instructor for military geography of the tactics department.

== World War II ==
After Operation Barbarossa began, then-Colonel Popov continued in his previous post. In August 1941 he was appointed deputy military commandant and chief of the Southern sector of the defense of Moscow. From 23 January 1942 he commanded the 135th Rifle Division, forming at Slobodskoy, Kirov Oblast. By 7 March the division joined the 4th Shock Army of the Kalinin Front and was relocated to the region of Toropets. The 135th was tasked with cutting the Bely-Prechistoye road and thus ensuring the destruction of the German force. For a month and a half the division was involved in fierce fighting and on 15 May it was withdrawn to the second echelon of the front. In early July, the division, as part of the 41st Army, fought in heavy offensive battles east of Bely, during which it was credited with inflicting significant losses on the opposing German forces: destroyed over 2,000 soldiers and officers, 54 tanks, more than 50 machine guns, two artillery and five mortar batteries. The division was withdrawn to the front reserve on 29 July.

On 14 November 1942, Popov, promoted to major general on 14 October, was appointed deputy commander of the 41st Army, during a period in which it defended on the line west and southwest of Bely, then in heavy combat actions against the Rzhev-Vyazma group of German troops. During December 1942 and January 1943 Popov temporarily commanded the 279th Rifle Division. On 21 March 1943, the 41st Army headquarters, after transferring its troops to the 39th and 43rd Armies, was withdrawn to the Reserve of the Supreme High Command (RVGK) before being disbanded by 9 April. During this period, Popov temporarily served as army commander.

In April, Popov was appointed commander of the 33rd Guards Rifle Corps, which became part of the 5th Guards Army of the Steppe Military District in July. He led the corps in the Battle of Kursk, during which it fought alongside the 32nd Guards Rifle Corps of the army in heavy defensive battles in the Psel in the region of Oboyan, halting the advance of the 1st SS Panzer Division Leibstandarte SS Adolf Hitler. The division then fought in the counterattack of the front in the Battle of Prokhorovka, During these actions, Popov demonstrated "heroism, courage, and firmness" in directing the units of the corps.

Placed at the disposal of the Main Personnel Directorate in August, Popov was appointed commander of the 94th Rifle Corps in the RVGK late that month. In November the corps joined the 1st Guards and then the 38th Armies of the 1st Ukrainian Front and fought in the Battle of the Dnieper, the Zhitomir–Berdichev offensive, and the Proskurov-Chernovitsy Offensive, in which it captured Starokonstantinov and Ternopol. In June 1944 the corps was relocated to the Karelian Front, where it joined the 7th Army, then in July to the 21st Army of the Leningrad Front. With the army, the corps fought in the Vyborg–Petrozavodsk offensive. In October the corps was withdrawn to the RVGK and relocated to the 3rd Belorussian Front. As part of the 21st, 11th Guards, 31st and 39th Armies of the front (then the Zemland Group of Forces from March 1945), the corps distinguished itself in the East Prussian offensive, taking the fortified points of Pillkallen and Schillen. In May 1945, the corps and its army were relocated to the Soviet Far East to join the Transbaikal Front, with which it fought in the Soviet invasion of Manchuria, being awarded the Order of the Red Banner.

== Postwar ==
After the end of the war, Popov commanded the 59th Rifle Corps in the Transbaikal-Amur Military District from 6 November 1945. From October 1946 he was at the disposal of the Commander-in-Chief of the Ground Forces, then in December was appointed chief of the tactics department of the A.M. Kaganovich Military Transportation Academy in Leningrad. From June 1952 he served as chief of the military department of the Leningrad Engineering-Economic Institute. Popov retired on 24 March 1958 and died in Leningrad on 6 December 1962.

== Awards ==
Popov was a recipient of the following awards and decorations:

- Order of Lenin (2)
- Order of the Red Banner (6)
- Order of Kutuzov, 2nd class
- Medals
