= 41st Guards Combined Arms Army =

- 41-я гвардейская общевойсковая армия
- Great emblem of the 41st Combined Arms Army
- Active: May 16, 1942 – April 9, 1943 / 1998–present
- Country: Soviet Union (until 1991); Russia
- Branch: Soviet Army (until 1991); Russian Ground Forces
- Type: Combined Arms
- Size: Field army
- Part of: Central Military District
- Garrison/HQ: Novosibirsk
- Engagements: World War II: Operation Mars; Operation Büffel; Russo-Ukrainian War: Siege of Chernihiv; Battle of the Siverskyi Donets; Battle of the Svatove-Kreminna line; 2023 Ukrainian counteroffensive; Battle of Ocheretyne; Pokrovsk offensive

Commanders
- Current commander: Lieutenant General Sergey Ryzhkov
- Notable commanders: German Tarasov; Ivan Managarov; Iosif Popov

Insignia
- Patch

The 41st Guards Combined Arms Army (Russian: 41-я гвардейская общевойсковая армия) is a field army of the Russian Ground Forces, currently part of the Central Military District. Originally, it was formed in 1942 as part of the Soviet Red Army, during World War II. It was reformed in 1998, when the Transbaikal Military District and Siberian Military District were amalgamated.

== Soviet Union ==
The 41st army was created in May 1942, on the base of Alexander Dmitrievich Berezin and German Tarasov's operational groups. Its structure also included the 134th, 135th, 179th and 234th Rifle Divisions, the 17th Guards Rifle Division, the 21st Tank Brigade, two separate Guards mortar battalions, and several other separate elements.

From May to November 1942, the army was focused on defending the South-Western approach to the city of Bely. In late November, the army joined the Rzhev offensive operation (also known as "Operation Mars"). During that time, the army fought the Wehrmacht XLI Panzer Corps. The army's offensive failed, and they were surrounded by the German XXX Army Corps (Germany). By December 8, the surrounded forces were destroyed.

In March 1943, the newly reinforced 41st Army joined the Rzhev-Vyazma operation. The offensive was a success and German forces in the Rzhev-Vyazma area were annihilated. Following the operation, the forces of the army were transferred to the 39th Army and the 43rd Army, while the 41st Army itself was sent to the Reserve of the Supreme High Command. On April 9, 1943, the army was disbanded and its remaining forces would form the Reserve Front.

== Russian Federation ==
The 41st Army was reformed on 1 December 1998 from the former headquarters of the Siberian Military District at Novosibirsk, part of the Siberian Military District. In 2002, the 122nd Guards Motor Rifle Division was relocated to Aleysk and became part of the army. During the Russian military reform in 2009, the division was converted into the 35th Separate Guards Motor Rifle Brigade. On 1 September 2010, the army was transferred to the Central Military District after the Siberian Military District was disbanded.

A dedicated electronic warfare battalion is scheduled to be formed within the 41st Combined Arms Army by the end of 2019.

=== 2022 Russian invasion of Ukraine ===
In the context of the prelude to the Russian invasion of Ukraine, major elements of the 41st Army were reported to have deployed west to reinforce units in the Western and Southern Military Districts assembled to threaten Ukraine. These units were said to include elements of the 35th, 55th Mountain and 74th Guards Motorised Rifle Brigades, as well as elements of the 120th Artillery Brigade, and 119th Missile Brigade, and the 6th Tank Regiment of the 90th Guards Tank Division. All told, some 700 MBTs, IFVs, and SPHs, as well as Iskander ballistic missile launchers were reported to have been repositioned to the west.

Starting during the early hours of February 24, 2022, elements of the 41st Army invaded Ukraine, crossing the border in the area of the tripartite border (Russia, Ukraine, Belarus) and going on the offensive towards Kyiv. Units of the 41st Army, including the 35th Separate Guards Motor Rifle Brigade, the 74th Separate Guards Motor Rifle Brigade, and the 55th Mountain Motor Rifle Brigade were reportedly operating near the city of Chernihiv throughout February and March 2022.

Major-General Andrei Sukhovetsky, the deputy chief of the 41st army, was killed during the invasion on February 28. In May 2022, parts of the 41st Combined Arms Army were part of the forces fighting in the battle of the Siverskyi Donets.

By February 2023, the army continued fighting in Luhansk along the Svatove–Kreminna line where the army's 35th Motor Rifle Brigade was seen fighting Ukrainian forces at Chervonopopivka.

During the 2023 Ukrainian counteroffensive, the army was observed to be in the process of a slow redeployment from Luhansk to southern Ukraine in August as fighting intensified there.

== Structure ==
June 1, 1942:

- 17th Guards Rifle Division
- 134th Rifle Division
- 135th Rifle Division
- 179th Rifle Division
- 234th Rifle Division
- 21st Armoured Brigade
- Separate Engineer and Artillery units

September 1, 1942:

- 17th Guards Rifle Division
- 134th Rifle Division
- 179th Rifle Division
- 234th Rifle Division
- 21st Armoured Brigade
- 104th Armoured Brigade
- Separate Engineer and Artillery units

December 1, 1942:

- 6th Rifle Corps
  - 150th Rifle Division
  - 74th Rifle Brigade
  - 75th Rifle Brigade
  - 78th Rifle Brigade
  - 91st Rifle Brigade
- 17th Guards Rifle Division
- 93rd Rifle Division
- 134th Rifle Division
- 234th Rifle Division
- 262nd Rifle Division
- 1st Mechanized Corps
  - 19th Mechanized Brigade
  - 35th Mechanized Brigade
  - 37th Mechanized Brigade
  - 65th Tank Brigade
  - 219th Tank Brigade
- 47th Mechanized Brigade
- 48th Mechanized Brigade
- 104th Armoured Brigade
- 154th Armoured Brigade
- Separate Engineer and Artillery units

March 1, 1943:

- 17th Guards Rifle Division
- 93rd Rifle Division
- 134th Rifle Division
- 262nd Rifle Division
- 75th Rifle Brigade
- 78th Rifle Brigade
- Separate Engineer and Artillery units

=== 2009 composition ===
- Headquarters - Novosibirsk
  - 85th Motor Rifle Division - Novosibirsk
  - 122nd Guards Motor Rifle Division - Aleysk
  - 74th Separate Motor Rifle Brigade - Yurga
  - many other storage bases

=== 2016 composition ===
- Army Headquarters (Novosibirsk)
- 35th Separate Guards Motor Rifle Brigade (Aleysk)
- 55th Mountain Motor Rifle Brigade (Kyzyl, Tuva Republic)
- 7th Separate Guards Tank Brigade (Chebarkul Oblast) (together with the 32nd Separate Motor Rifle Brigade the 7th Separate Guards Tank Brigade was used to form the 90th Guards Tank Division in December 2016)
- 74th Guards Motor Rifle Brigade (Yurga)
- 119th Rocket Brigade (Elansky) Brigade, at 56.838036, 62.510133.
- 120th Guards Artillery Brigade (Yurga)
- 61st Anti-Aircraft Rocket Brigade (Biysk)
- 35th Headquarters Brigade (Kochenyovo)
- 106th Separate Logistic Support Brigade (Yurga)
- 10th Separate NBC Protection Regiment (Topchikha)

Later (at least by 2020) the 24th (Kyzyl) and the 40th Engineer-Sapper Regiments (Ishim, Tyumen Oblast) were subordinated to the army.

== Commanders ==
=== Soviet formation ===
- Major General German Tarasov (May - December 1942)
- Major General Ivan Managarov (December 1942 -March 1943)
- Major General Iosif Popov (March - April 1943)

=== Russian formation ===
- Lieutenant General Aleksandr Morozov (July 1998 - June 2001)
- Lieutenant General Vladimir Kovrov (June 2001 - July 2003)
- Major General Sergey Bunin (July 2003 - August 2004)
- Lieutenant General Arkady Bakhin (October 2004 - January 2006)
- Major General, since 2007 Lieutenant General Aleksandr Galkin (January 2006 - April 2008)
- Major General Sergey Istakov (May 2008 - June 2009)
- Lieutenant General Vasily Tonkoshkurov (June 2009 - October 2013)
- Major General, since 2014 Lieutenant General Khasan Kaloyev (October 2013 - January 2016)
- Major General, since 2017 Lieutenant General Aleksey Zavizon (January 2016 - November 2018)
- Major General Yakov Rezantsev (November 2018 - August 2020)
- Major General, since 12/10/2020 Lieutenant General Sergey Ryzhkov (August 2020 – present)
