= 135th Rifle Division =

135th Rifle Division (September 7, 1939 – December 27, 1941) 135th Rifle Division (January 5, 1942 – July 1945)
- Active: 1939–1945
- Country: Soviet Union
- Branch: Red Army (1939-46)
- Type: Infantry
- Size: Division
- Engagements: Soviet annexation of Western Belorussia; Operation Barbarossa; Battle of Kiev (1941); Roslavl–Novozybkov offensive Battles of Rzhev; Operation "Seydlitz"; Operation Mars; Operation Büffel; Operation Kutuzov; Battle of Kiev (1943); Zhitomir–Berdichev offensive Kamenets–Podolsky pocket Svir–Petrozavodsk offensive Sandomierz–Silesian offensive Lower Silesian offensive Upper Silesian offensive Siege of Breslau
- Decorations: Order of the Red Banner (2nd Formation)
- Battle honours: Krakow (2nd Formation)

Commanders
- Notable commanders: Maj. Gen. Fyodor Nikandrovich Smekhotvorov; Col. Yosif Ivanovich Popov; Col. Vasilii Grigorevich Kovalenko; Col. Aleksandr Nikitich Sosnov; Maj. Gen. Filipp Nikolaevich Romashin

The 135th Rifle Division was first formed as an infantry division of the Red Army in early September 1939 in the Ukrainian (later Kiev Special) Military District, based on the shtat (table of organization and equipment) of September 13. Although barely formed it took part in the invasion of eastern Poland later that month as part of Ukrainian Front. At the outset of the German invasion on June 22, 1941, it was moving toward the frontier in western Ukraine near Dubno, as part of 5th Army. It quickly encountered the panzers of III Motorized Corps and was driven off toward Rivne, losing most of its strength in the process. After taking up defenses on the north flank of the German penetration to Kyiv during July, it was moved to the rear and was partly rebuilt before being reassigned to the new 40th Army on Southwestern Front's extreme right flank. When the German drive to encircle this Front began in the first days of September the 135th narrowly escaped the trap and gradually fell back to the east in the Kharkiv area. By the end of October it was clear that the resources weren't available to rebuild it again and its headquarters was disbanded, while one rifle regiment continued to fight under Army command. The division was officially stricken on December 27.

A new 135th was created in early January 1942, on the basis of a 400-series division, largely at Kolomna in the Moscow Military District. It was soon sent west to join Kalinin Front, being briefly assigned to 4th Shock Army before being moved back to Front reserves for further training. In May it was moved to 41st Army in the same Front. In July, Army Group Center launched an operation to clear the rear areas of its Rzhev salient and the division was quickly encircled; its remnants were forced to break out at enormous cost and were then returned to Front reserves for an almost complete rebuilding. In October it was assigned to 39th Army of the same Front, and formed part of its shock group in November's Operation Mars. 39th Army managed to make one of the few permanent gains of territory during this offensive, but it came at significant cost, and following the withdrawal of German 9th Army from the salient in March 1943 the 135th was pulled back to the Reserve of the Supreme High Command for another rebuilding, assigned to 11th Army. This Army returned to the fighting front in July, just in time to take part in the offensive that drove 9th Army out of its salient around Oryol. Just as this campaign was ending in August the division returned to the Reserve of the Supreme High Command, eventually returning in early November west of Kyiv as part of 1st Ukrainian Front's 38th Army. It immediately took part in the pursuit of the German forces defeated in the battle for that city, but was soon struck by armored counterattacks that drove it back with serious casualties. During the first months of 1944 it continued its advance into western Ukraine, eventually as part of 60th Army, but returned again to the Reserve of the Supreme High Command, now to be sent north to Karelia to join 7th Army in the offensive that drove Finland out of the war. After spending nearly the remainder of the year in Leningrad Front, under 21st and 59th Armies, it was again redeployed with the latter for the final offensive into Poland and Germany under 1st Ukrainian Front. In January 1945 it advanced into southern Poland and Silesia, receiving a battle honor in the process. During the following months the 135th saw extensive service in Silesia, and ended the war under 6th Army in the siege of Breslau, for which it was awarded the Order of the Red Banner a month before it was disbanded in July.

== 1st Formation ==
The division was formed on the basis of a cadre from the 25th Rifle Division at Pryluky in the Ukrainian Military District on September 7, 1939. Given this experienced cadre it was able to take part in the invasion of eastern Poland later that month. Maj. Gen. Fyodor Nikandrovich Smekhotvorov was given command of the 135th on June 13, 1940, and he would remain in command for the duration of the first formation. This officer had been serving since September 1936 on the staffs of the Siberian Military District and the Kharkov Military District.

At the start of the German invasion at 0400 hours the division was moving east of Dubno, near Kivertsy Camp, some 100km from the frontier, marching from Ostriv and Iziaslav in the direction of Lokachi. Smekhotvorov had 9,911 personnel on strength, including 935 officers and 1,550 NCOs, and they were armed and equipped with 6,682 rifles, 422 submachine guns, 465 light machine guns, 233 heavy machine guns, a pair of quad antiaircraft machine guns, 54 45mm antitank guns, four 37mm and four 76mm antiaircraft guns, 35 76mm guns (cannon and infantry guns), 28 122mm and 13 152mm howitzers, 12 120mm, 54 82mm, and 83 50mm mortars, 276 trucks, 17 tractors, and 2,078 horses. It was in 5th Army's 27th Rifle Corps of the Kiev Special Military District (soon redesignated Southwestern Front), which also contained the 87th and 124th Rifle Divisions. Its order of battle was as follows:

- 396th Rifle Regiment
- 497th Rifle Regiment
- 791st Rifle Regiment
- 276th Artillery Regiment
- 184th Howitzer Artillery Regiment
- 173rd Antitank Battalion
- 170th Antiaircraft Battalion
- 120th Reconnaissance Battalion
- 157th Sapper Battalion
- 168th Signal Battalion
- 138th Medical/Sanitation Battalion
- 135th Chemical Defense (Anti-gas) Platoon
- 119th Motor Transport Battalion
- 115th Field Bakery
- 178th Field Postal Station
- 347th Field Office of the State Bank

While on the march it came under air attacks. On June 24 Smekhotvorov received new orders to advance toward Volodymyr to join forces with the 87th. The division went over to the attack at 1400 hours, but German armor of III Motorized Corps arrived by 1700 and it was forced to retreat to a line some 12km-16km west of Lutsk. Having suffered heavy losses in this effort it pulled back to the east bank of the Styr the next day and attempted to counterattack, but by June 26 it was in full retreat toward Rivne. As of July 1 the 87th had been detached from the rest of the Corps.

=== Battle of Kyiv ===
As of July 7 the 135th was attempting to hold along the Sluch River south of Novohrad-Volynskyi. By July 10 the 27th Corps had been disbanded and the 135th and 124th were under direct Army command. Smekhotvorov had been ordered to organize a fall-back line along the Irsha River with what remained of his division, which amounted to 1,276 personnel, just 38 guns and mortars of all types, and ten heavy machine guns. This position was established by July 22, but by now the division had just 400 men remaining. By August 1 it had been assigned to 15th Rifle Corps, still in 5th Army, but between August 8-10 it was withdrawn to the Korosten area, losing its rearguard to an encirclement move in the process. Over the following weeks it received replacements, in the form of march battalions and some raw recruits, bringing it back to a strength of 4,500 by August 25, although it still had very few heavy weapons.

In the last days of the month the 135th was placed under command of 40th Army, a scratch force intended to link Southwestern Front with Bryansk Front to the north. Southwestern Front's commander, Col. Gen. M. P. Kirponos, issued his Operational Directive No. 00322 at 1600 hours on August 28, several hours after the Army made initial contact with German forces, in which he described its mission, in part:

3. 40th Army (293rd and 135th RDs, 10th [Tank Division], 2nd [Airborne Corps], and 5th [Antitank Brigade]), having occupied the Korop and Maloe Ust'e sector [30km west of Korop] with the units of 2nd AbnC, which are arriving by auto-transport, will continue to defend the Pirogovka Station and Stepanovka [from 50km northeast of Korop to 65km west-southwest of Korop] front along the southern bank of the Desna River.
The army's mission - prevent a penetration by the enemy along the Krolevets, Vorozhba and Konotop axes and firmly defend the right wing of the front against attacks by the enemy from the north.
Headquarters - Konotop.

Thus the Army, under command of Maj. Gen. K. P. Podlas, raised hurriedly, was expected to defend a 115km-wide front with a paltry force of just over four divisions manned by roughly 50,000 men and about 40 tanks. At 2200 Podlas reported that the 135th was on a line from Bolshoe Uste to Volovitsa, from 32km to 68km west-southwest of Korop, an extremely wide sector for a depleted division.

As his formations continued arriving in the Hlukhiv, Krolevets and Konotop region, Podlas committed them to action immediately, with orders to attack the lead elements of XXIV Motorized Corps' 10th Motorized and 3rd Panzer Divisions as they crossed the Desna. By the time they did, 3rd Panzer was well north of Novhorod-Siverskyi, and 10th Motorized had seized Korop. Complicating Podlas' task was that while 40th Army was under Kirponos' command, it was actually wedged between Bryansk Front's 21st and 13th Armies. The obvious solution, to move 40th Army from one Front to the other, was rejected.

=== Roslavl-Novozybkov Offensive ===
In the Southwestern Front's operational summary at 2200 hours on August 30, the 135th was said to be "attacking with part of its forces toward Korop, occupied Sukhachi [6km west of Korop], and is continuing its advance." This was being led by the 791st Rifle Regiment. Beginning in the afternoon and through all of August 31 the division, along with 2nd Airborne and two regiments of the 293rd, made converging counterattacks on the lead battlegroup of 10th Motorized south of Korop, plus its main body at Korop itself. While the airborne troops managed to encircle the lead German battalion and force it back to the town, having lost some 200 men, Smekhotvorov was mainly involved in constructing defenses along the river and conducting reconnaissance in an effort to join hands with 21st Army. The commander of 2nd Panzer Group, Gen. H. Guderian, was sufficiently concerned with the plight of 10th Motorized that he called for reserves from Army Group Center. On the same day the Front reached the conclusion that "The enemy forces attacking toward Chernigov are trying to reach the rear of our units operating to the north of Kiev..."

The situation remained largely static until September 2, when XXIV Panzer Corps renewed its drive to the south, splitting the 135th from the 293rd. A report reached Podlas' headquarters at 0130 hours on September 3 stating that "up to 50 enemy tanks with motorized infantry and motorcyclists are in the Dobrotovo region [17km east-southeast of Korop] and the woods 2 kilometres south of Obtovo..." The sudden strike had smashed the defenses of 40th Army's right wing and 4th Panzer Division took Krolevets. The 791st Regiment was reported as moving eastward to the Krasnopole region; the German advance was effectively pushing the 135th and 293rd outside the upcoming Kyiv pocket. Podlas was receiving reinforcements from 3rd Airborne Corps but this was little help against a panzer corps. The German force broke into the clear on September 4-5 and Podlas had no choice but to withdraw toward Konotop and the Seym River.

The 3rd and 4th Panzer Divisions were able to cross the Seym on September 8 before seizing Konotop the next day, although Guderian noted how much his forces needed rest and replenishment. In the morning of September 13, 3rd Panzer captured Lokhvytsia, where it would meet up with 1st Panzer Group two days later, completing the encirclement of the Kyiv pocket. During the last weeks of the month the remnants of Southwestern Front were gradually eliminated, while 40th Army struggled to hold a defensive line west of, and later east of, Kharkiv. During fighting through the end of October Smekhotvorov's headquarters controlled regiments of several other divisions, including the 123rd Rifle Regiment of the 62nd Rifle Division and the 244th Rifle Regiment of the 41st Rifle Division, but finally the headquarters was disbanded, leaving the 791st Rifle Regiment to serve as a separate unit under direct command of 40th Army. In common with many other divisions of Southwestern Front the 135th was officially written off on December 27. Smekhotvorov would soon be given command of the 193rd Rifle Division, which he would lead in the defense of the factory district at Stalingrad. He was then moved to the 106th Rifle Division, but was severely wounded and hospitalized in August 1943, and spent the remainder of his career in the educational establishment before retiring in November 1954.

== 2nd Formation ==
A new division, preliminarily numbered as the 401st, began forming at Slobodskoy in the Moscow Military District in early December 1941 before being moved to Kolomna. On January 5, 1942, it was redesignated as the 135th. Col. Yosif Ivanovich Popov was appointed to command on January 23. When complete its order of battle was as follows:

- 396th Rifle Regiment
- 497th Rifle Regiment
- 791st Rifle Regiment
- 276th Artillery Regiment
- 173rd Antitank Battalion
- 170th Antiaircraft Battalion
- 120th Reconnaissance Company
- 157th Sapper Battalion
- 168th Signal Battalion (later 251st, 1436th Signal Companies)
- 138th Medical/Sanitation Battalion
- 192nd Chemical Defense (Anti-gas) Company
- 119th Motor Transport Company
- 410th Field Bakery
- 821st Divisional Veterinary Hospital (later 831st)
- 1714th Field Postal Station
- 1054th Field Office of the State Bank

In February it began moving west into the large salient that had been formed around Toropets where it came under command of Kalinin Front, being assigned to 4th Shock Army in March. This salient formed the western face of the Rzhev salient held by German 9th Army.

== Battles for Rzhev ==
In April the 135th again came under direct command of the Front, before being assigned to 41st Army in May. After months of winter combat both sides were close to exhaustion, and the tactical position was extremely complex. 9th Army was determined to secure its rear areas before the Red Army could renew its efforts to cut off the salient. To this end, on May 24 Operation Hannover was launched against Group Belov near Vyazma. By June 27 the survivors of this Group had broken out to friendly territory. Army Group Center now planned Operation Seydlitz, intended to eliminate Kalinin Front's 39th Army and 11th Cavalry Corps, operating between Bely and Sychyovka in a salient around Kholm-Zhirkovsky.

Seydlitz began in the morning of July 2, after several delays due to weather. Communications between the Front and its 39th and 22nd Armies were limited to a narrow corridor and both formations were dangerously low on supplies. The attackers focused on the narrowest part of the corridor, striking 41st Army near Bely and the 39th and 22nd on the Olenino axis. Tough Soviet resistance limited or stopped any German advance with heavy losses. On July 4 the attack was renewed, now on three directions, with air support near Sychyovka, and the village containing the 39th Army headquarters was taken. Armored reinforcements were added the next day, and the corridor was cut at the village of Pushkari, north of Bely, on July 6. In addition to 39th Army the left wing of 41st Army (135th, 17th Guards Rifle Division, 21st Tank Brigade) and the right flank of 22nd Army were all now trapped. The next day, German forces attacking from Sychyovka reached Bely and created a second pocket. The German command sent infiltrators, speaking Russian or Central Asian languages and wearing Red Army uniforms, to spread disinformation and even lead trapped men into captivity. During July 7-9 units of 41st Army filtered out of the pocket before German reinforcements came up to more fully seal the encirclement. Seydlitz was officially finished on July 13, but individuals, small groups, and even large groups managed to get out over the coming weeks. Starting at 2200 hours on July 21 the 41st and 22nd Armies launched deliberate operations to link up with these groups; by 0400 the next day some 10,000 men had got out. Eventually about 18,000 escaped, including Colonel Popov and some 1,000 of the 135th, but during the month 41st Army had suffered 13,902 casualties, including 2,000 killed and 6,347 missing.

On July 31 the division was ordered back to Kalinin Front reserves in the Torzhok area, where it arrived by August 12. On October 7, Popov was replaced in command by Col. Vasilii Grigorevich Kovalenko. Popov now took deputy command of 41st Army and would later lead 33rd Guards and 94th Rifle Corps; the 135th would come under his command again as part of the latter in 1944. Kovalenko had previously led the 18th Cavalry Division (part of 11th Cavalry Corps) before it was disbanded in August. Shortly after this handover the 135th was assigned to the rebuilt 39th Army, still in Kalinin Front.

=== Operation Mars ===
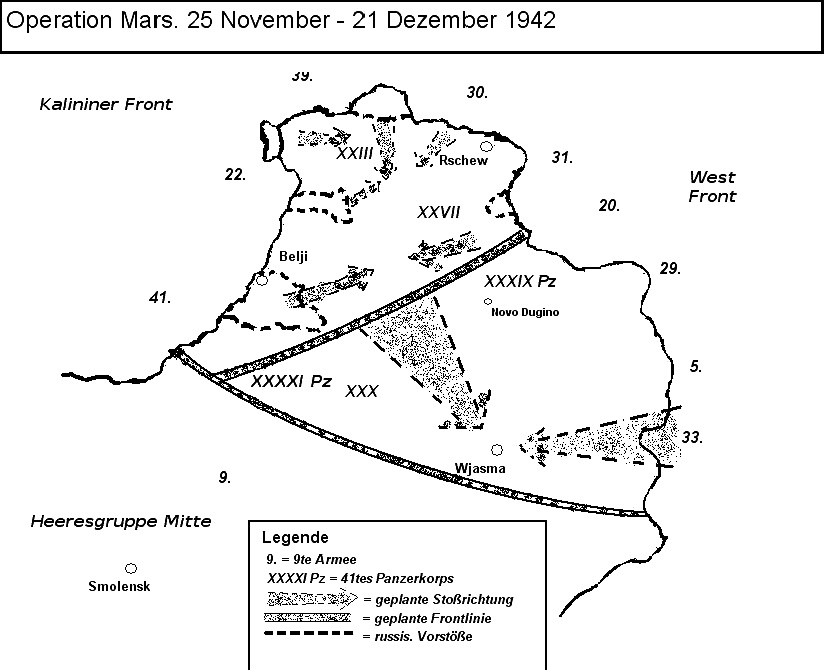
Operation Mars. Note position of 39th Army.

Maj. Gen. A. I. Zygin was in command of 39th Army in November; the Army was deployed at the northernmost tip of the Rzhev salient, around the village of Molodoi Tud and the small river of the same name. In the planning for Operation Mars the main weight of the attack was to come from Western Front's 20th Army and Kalinin Front's 41st Army to pinch off the main body of 9th Army north of Sychyovka. 39th Army's task was largely diversionary in nature, intended to draw German reserves, but if successful it would reach and cut the Rzhev–Olenino road and railroad.

The 135th, on the left flank of Zygin's shock group, had the 497th and 791st Rifle Regiments on the left bank of the Volga west of the village of Sevastlanovo, while the 396th was in Army reserve to the rear. The 81st Tank Brigade was also deployed behind the forward regiments. The terrain in the sector was difficult, and the German forces had heavily fortified the south bank of the Molodoi Tud River, but in mitigation they had only one division, the 206th, in the line, although 14th Motorized Division was known to be in reserve. Zygin saw his immediate objective as the town of Urdom, which would encircle the 206th. He planned to attack across the river with the 158th, 135th, and 373rd Rifle Divisions after a one-hour artillery preparation, supported by the 81st and 28th Tank Brigades. The 348th Rifle Division was in reserve.

The artillery fire began at 0900 hours on November 25, but visibility was hampered by a mix of snow and fog. The infantry assault went in at 1000, led by sappers carrying timber and logs to place across the frozen Molodoi Tud, where sounds of rifle and mortar fire soon erupted. Less than 30 minutes later Col. D. I. Kuzmin of the 81st got the word to advance, but as his tanks reached the river with the main force battalions of the 135th and 373rd men of the lead companies began to reappear on the far bank. It quickly became apparent that the artillery had failed to destroy or suppress many of the German strongpoints, and these men had been forced back by heavy fire. Despite this, Kuzmin's KV and T-34 tanks, in narrow columns, forced crossings and advanced unsupported, but this failed to move the infantry and he ordered his battalions back to the river. Zygin soon learned that the 158th had fared equally poorly for much the same reasons. Zygin ordered all three divisions to regroup to renew the attack the next day. Meanwhile, the forces on 39th Army's flanks gained some successes and seemed to be making the German position untenable until the arrival of elements of the Panzer-Grenadier-Division Großdeutschland at 1800 partly restored the situation.

Early on the morning of November 26 a slightly stronger artillery preparation was laid on, with much improved observation as the weather cleared, which also allowed air support. This time the tanks and infantry got across as a team, aided by better visibility as German strongpoints were wiped out one by one by artillery and tank fire. Colonel Kuzmin was killed by antitank fire near the village of Kazakovo, but the 81st pushed on with Kovalenko's lead regiments. By dusk the defenders had been pushed back 2km to the village of Palatkino, which was taken after heavy fighting. This formed part of the second defensive line of 206th Infantry's 301st Grenadier Regiment, which counterattacked repeatedly to no avail. The attack was renewed early the next morning, and Kovalenko committed the 396th Regiment late in the afternoon, which forced the 206th Infantry commander, General Hitter, to order the first of a series of withdrawals. Despite this pressure, by nightfall Hitter had stabilized his line but desperately hoped for assistance from Großdeutschland. All that could be spared were a few company teams to reinforce his 301st Grenadier Regiment as the remainder of the panzer grenadiers were needed in the Luchesa valley to the south. Zygin was pleased with his progress and expected to take Urdom the next day.

In the event, despite a renewed artillery preparation in the morning the Soviet advance stalled. Numerous German strongpoints were dug in through a network of villages and a seesaw struggle went on into November 29, although this mainly involved the 135th and 373rd Divisions, as well as the tanks. Urdom was approached but not taken, and Zygin's proposal to commit the 348th was approved. Zhukov emphasized that the drive on Urdom and Olenino must be accelerated. Before dawn on November 30 Zygin conferred with his main subordinates on a new plan to take Urdom, despite the 135th and 373rd having lost nearly half of their personnel in the previous days. The 135th and 348th were to strike the defenses west and east of the town while a regiment of the 373rd, along with the remaining tanks, led by a handful of KVs, would try to envelop the position. The attack went on all day, and the KVs reduced the remaining strongpoints with direct fire, at the cost of roughly half of their remaining numbers. By nightfall Urdom was in 39th Army's hands, although the defenders still held along the road to each side of it, leaving their line intact. Zygin had no choice but to call off further attacks until his force had regrouped and received reinforcements.

Army Gen. G. K. Zhukov issued orders on December 8 for his forces to "press ahead... in the general direction of Olenino, crush the enemy group there by 16 December, and emerge in the vicinity of Olenino," attempting to salvage something from an offensive that had already clearly failed. Zygin had already renewed attacks east of Zaitsevo and on the Gliadovo sector, which he was to continue. He had already regrouped the 135th from Urdom to back up several local successes by the 178th Rifle Division and 46th Mechanized Brigade near Trushkovo. On December 7 the combined force had smashed through the defenses at the junction of 14th Motorized and the 251st Infantry Division, forcing the former to give way and surrender Gonchuki and several nearby villages after an advance of up to 3km. What remained of the 14th was subordinated to the 251st. On December 11 a large Soviet tank force broke through the defenses opposite Gonchuki and pushed into the forests to the southwest. Only the intervention of a battlegroup of 6th Infantry Division neutralized this threat. Zygin renewed his attack, at Zhukov's insistence, on December 13 with a massive 4-hour artillery preparation, but this produced meagre results. The fighting continued, in waning strength,until December 23, when Zhukov finally ordered the 39th Army over to the defense. While the Urdom salient proved nearly the only permanent gain of Operation Mars, it cost the 39th very heavy casualties and left it almost 20km short of the Rzhev–Olenino route.

On January 4, 1943, Colonel Kovalenko was removed from his post, soon becoming deputy commander of the 158th. In September he was given command of the 219th Rifle Division, which he would lead for the duration of the war. He was replaced by Col. Aleksandr Nikitich Sosnov. Beginning on March 2 the 135th, along with the rest of its Army, took part in the Rzhev-Vyasma offensive, also known as Operation Büffel, the evacuation of the Rzhev salient. Through the month it followed up the withdrawal until reaching the prepared positions at its base. On April 5 the 135th left 39th Army and Kalinin Front to enter the Reserve of the Supreme High Command where it was assigned to 11th Army for extensive rebuilding. On July 12 it returned to the active army as part of the Army's 53rd Rifle Corps, now as part of Bryansk Front.

== Operation Kutuzov ==
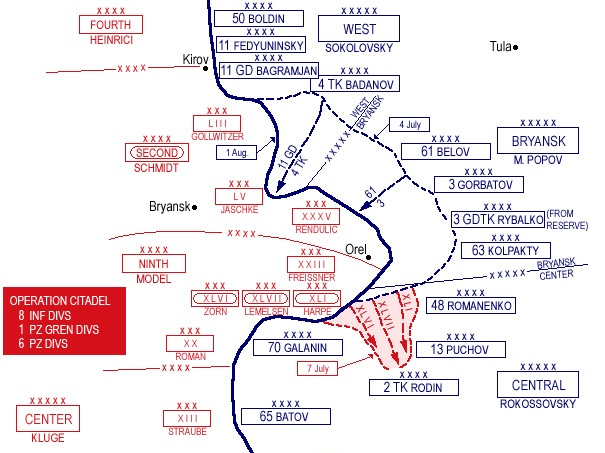
Map of Operation Kutuzov. Note position of 11th Army.

The Battle of Kursk was raging when the 135th reached the front, and Operation Kutuzov, the offensive to drive German 9th Army from the salient around Oryol, began on the same date, but 11th Army was still far to the rear. On July 14 it came under command of Lt. Gen. I. I. Fedyuninskii. In six days the Army mostly completed a 160km approach march, until by 1100 hours on July 20 its lead elements took up a jumping-off position from Chishche to Moilovo, then southeast along the Resseta River to the crossing at Ktsyn. It was to be committed from the march on the right flank of 11th Guards Army in order to cover that flank and reduce its front. In fact only four of the Army's eight divisions reached this line, including the 135th, with the remainder trailing behind. Due to a shortage of transport its artillery was carrying less than 0.7 of a combat load of ammunition. The infantry was worn out by a lengthy march along bad roads washed out by rain. The artillery became stretched out and the support elements fell behind. There was no time for carrying out additional reconnaissance, registering artillery, putting units in order, or bring up stragglers.

Fedyuninskii decided to launch his main attack in the direction of Brusny and Khvastovichi with four divisions (260th, 273rd, 135th, and 369th) in first echelon and three (4th, 96th, and 197th) in second echelon. The 323rd Rifle Division was left in Army reserve. The artillery in support had a density of no more than 63 tubes per kilometre of front because so much of it was still on the move. The defenders consisted of the 134th, 211th, and 183rd Infantry Divisions and 5th Panzer Division, plus the 50th Independent Regiment.

Following a 30-minute artillery preparation the first echelon went over to the attack at 1230 hours. This proved largely ineffective, as the German forces occupied terrain favorable to the defense and stopped most of the infantry and tanks with powerful fire and counterattacks. The one exception was the 369th, on the Army's left flank adjacent to 11th Guards, which penetrated the wooded and swampy area southeast of Moilovo, forced the Resseta, and cut the road between Moilovo and Ktsyn. On July 21, units of the Army occupied Moilovo, and the next day Ktsyn. As a result of powerful and insistent counterattacks the German forces once again broke into the villages but failed to hold them for long. Moilovo was retaken the same day, and while Ktsyn held out longer, it was threatened with encirclement two days later. Fedyuninskii now concentrated the 197th and 323rd Divisions behind his left flank. These broke through the German defense with an attack on Kolodyatzsy, forcing the German grouping to fall back from the two villages. By the close of July 25 the Army reached a line north of Granki, Mekhovaya, Katunovka and Kharitonovka. On July 26 and 27 the German command committed fresh units of the 707th and 95th Infantry Divisions along this sector, as well as a number of independent units. The Army's further offensive halted and before July 30 it did not make any significant advance.

Oryol was completely cleared by dawn on August 5, and Operation Kutuzov ended on August 18 when Soviet forces reached the Hagen position at the base of the Oryol salient east of Bryansk. Just before this, on August 15, Colonel Sosnov left the division, being replaced by Col. Filipp Nikolaevich Romashin on August 21. This officer had previously led the 370th and 235th Rifle Divisions, but had been relieved in July "for inability to organize a battle in modern conditions." He would remain in command of the 135th for the duration of the war, being promoted to the rank of major general on April 20, 1945.

At the start of September the 135th was still under 53rd Corps of 11th Army, and it took part in the operation to liberate Bryansk itself, but just before this, on September 13 it was again removed to the Reserve of the Supreme High Command, joining 95th Rifle Corps of 70th Army briefly before returning to the active army on November 3 as part of 21st Rifle Corps of 1st Ukrainian Front's 38th Army near Kyiv.

== Into Western Ukraine ==
Upon its return to the front the division was on the short shtat of that period, with 819 officers (30 of which were women), 1,410 NCOs (20 women), and 5,061 other ranks (56 women), for a total of 7,290 personnel out of an authorized 7,309. It had a total of 856 horses of an authorized allowance of 1,737, of which 98 were riding mounts, 243 were draft animals, and 515 were pack horses. Equipment included 79 trucks, one "special" truck, 42 tractors, 3,208 rifles, 1,902 submachine guns, 287 light machine guns, 89 heavy machine guns, 107 antitank rifles, 11 122mm and eight 76mm howitzers, 19 76mm cannon, 39 45mm antitank guns, 43 50mm, 67 82mm, and 13 120mm mortars, 40 horse-drawn field kitchens, and 45 radios.

=== Kyiv Strategic Defensive Operation ===
Kyiv was cleared of German troops early on November 6, after which 38th Army began a pursuit to the west. The 21st Corps was directed to the southwest; it covered some 20km against negligible resistance and the 135th reached the area of Malyutyanka area, although the Corps, and its partner 23rd Rifle Corps, had been expected to advance farther. On the same day the new 25th Panzer Division began offloading at Berdychiv. During the following day 21st Corps gained up to 12km, ending on a line from Kniazhychi to Zvonkivaya to Plesetskoye. On November 9 the Corps, now advancing on the 44km-wide frontage, made its best progress (up to 14km) on the Brusyliv axis. By now the Front commander, Army Gen. N. F. Vatutin, was warning against the possibility of a mass German tank attack, and urged strong antitank measures be carried out.

This proved correct the next day as 21st Corps repelled repeated panzer counterattacks, losing some ground in the process. On November 11 the Corps reached a line from Karabachin to Khomutets to east of Skragilevka. The next day it pushed on to the line Ivnitsa–Khodorkiv–Krivoye in the morning, but during the pursuit the divisional artillery had fallen behind in the muddy conditions and the front line troops had little ammunition. At 1000 hours on November 12 a group of 20-25 tanks of 7th Panzer Division struck the 71st Rifle Division on the Khodorkov–Krivoye sector and drove it back to the north, which uncovered the flank and rear of the 135th on the approaches to Kotliarka and Koylivka, forcing it back to the northeast in disorganization. Overnight on November 12/13 the STAVKA ordered the 38th, 40th and 3rd Guards Tank Armies to take up defensive positions along the front Zhytomyr–Fastiv–Trypillia. 38th Army's 21st and 23rd Corps took up a line from Kamenka and the Huiva River as far as Volitsa station. The German advance on November 13, led by half of 1st SS Panzer Division Leibstandarte SS Adolf Hitler and elements of the arriving 1st Panzer Division, first struck at Fastiv but then shifted to the west against 21st Corps. In the latter half of the day the German force managed to break through the Corps' front and advance toward Brusyliv. The Corps was quickly reinforced with antitank artillery, the 13th Artillery Division, and a group of 59 tanks from 3rd Guards Tank Army. On November 14 the 71st Division was forced to abandon the communities of Sobolevka and Korolevka.

As an indication of the damage the 135th had suffered in the German counterstrike its strengths were reported on November 15 as follow: 3,601 personnel; 52 mortars; three 76mm regimental guns; nine 76mm cannon and six 122mm howitzers. 38th Army's defense was still not complete and there were large gaps between the divisions of 21st Corps; ammunition and fuel were still in short supply. 4th Panzer Army, which had established that the 21st Corps' sector was weak, shifted its axis of attack to the line Brusyliv–Kornyn, which 71st Division had previously held. At dawn it attacked with 1st and 1st SS Panzer toward Solovyovka and Brusyliv and captured the former place by day's end. An armored group from 3rd Guards Tanks plus the 17th Guards Rifle Corps fell back to the north, and 71st Division retreated behind that Corps after putting up weak resistance. Vatutin now made 60th Army responsible for the defense of Zhytomyr.

Overnight, in 38th Army the 202nd Division was authorized to pull back, but the 135th continued to hold its positions. Despite all efforts the Front's situation in the areas of Zhytomyr and Brusyliv continued to worsen during November 17. Following the penetration at Vilnya the main forces of 1st SS Panzer and 1st Panzer were concentrated there in preparation for attacks to the north and northwest. 38th and 3rd Guards Tank Armies were engaged in bitter fighting all day but lead elements of the 1st SS managed to reach the Zhytomyr-Kyiv paved road and turned east. Meanwhile, additional German reserves were arriving. In a regrouping on November 18 the 202nd was detached from 21st Corps, being replaced by the 241st Rifle Division, and it took up a line from outside Morozivka to Luchin to Stavni. Vatutin now issued orders to the Army to launch a counteroffensive on November 21. During November 19 the momentum of 4th Panzer Army began to decline, although 17th Guards Corps was forced to abandon Morozivka. After regrouping the panzer forces focused on encircling 38th Army's Brusyliv group of forces and although the town was taken on November 23 and Vatutin's planned counterstroke was suspended the encirclement was not successful. Fighting continued through November 25-29 but both sides were by now effectively played out. As of December 1 the 21st Corps consisted of the 71st, 135th, and 100th Rifle Divisions.

=== Zhitomir–Berdichev and Proskurov-Chernivtsi Offensives ===
Vatutin's counteroffensive finally began on December 24 but initially only involved the 1st Guards and the 1st Tank Armies. It soon expanded to include the 38th Army, which was facing the German XIII Army Corps north of Zhytomyr. By December 30 the 4th Panzer Army's front was breaking apart and a 58km-wide gap had opened between it and XIII Corps; the following day Zhytomyr was liberated for the second time. On January 4, 1944, that Corps, attempting to hold at and northwest of Berdychiv, reported that it was falling apart, and that city fell a few days later. By the end of the month the lines had stabilized north of Vinnytsia.

During February the 135th was moved to the 106th Rifle Corps, still in 38th Army. The offensive was renewed on March 4. 38th Army was on the left (south) flank of the Front and its initial objective was Vinnytsia, after which it was to continue to advance southwest toward Zhmerynka, which had been designated as a Festung (fortress) by Hitler. The former was liberated on March 20. Later in the month the division was again reassigned, along with the rest of 106th Corps, to 60th Army. This was followed by a shift in April to 94th Rifle Corps in the same Army.

== Svir–Petrozavodsk Offensive ==
By May the STAVKA was making preparations for a new series of offensives to drive Finland out of the war, and for this purpose began drawing reinforcements from other sectors of the front. On June 5 the 135th again entered the Reserve of the Supreme High Command and loaded on trains with the rest of 94th Corps to join the 7th Army of Karelian Front. The Corps now contained the 135th, 221st, and 327th Rifle Divisions, and it rejoined the active army on June 15.

Leningrad Front had begun its offensive against Finland on the Karelian Isthmus on June 10 and 7th Army was set to begin its own Svir–Petrozavodsk offensive on June 20 on the Olonets sector. Given its unfamiliarity with the terrain it faced the Corps was used in a follow-on role. The Finnish V and VI Corps evacuated a large bridgehead south of the Svir on June 18, evading the first blows of the Soviet operation and thereafter engaging in a stubborn retreat against an aggressive pursuit; Petrozavodsk fell on June 30 and by July 10 the Finnish forces were in the 'U'-line where the offensive paused.

Later in July the 94th Corps was again reassigned, now to 21st Army in Leningrad Front, located on the Karelian Isthmus. By this time the Soviets had gained most of its objectives in the war against Finland and by the middle of the month was removing its more powerful units, especially armor, for re-employment elsewhere. Although some fighting continued until the September 19 armistice, the Red Army was largely on the defensive. On October 1 the 135th was reassigned to 43rd Rifle Corps in 59th Army, still in Leningrad Front, moving to the 115th Rifle Corps of the same Army in November. On December 2, still under these commands, the division again entered the Reserve of the Supreme High Command, and began moving south.

== Sandomierz–Silesian Offensive ==
When the 135th re-entered the fighting front on December 20 it was back in 1st Ukrainian Front, again in 59th Army's 43rd Corps. It took up positions in the Sandomierz-Baranów bridgehead that had been seized across the Vistula in August. The Sandomierz–Silesian operation, part of the overall Vistula-Oder offensive, began on January 12, 1945. By now the division was back under 115th Corps' command, and on January 19 it won a battle honor:

KRAKOW... 135th Rifle Division (Col. Romashin, Filipp Nikolaevich)... By order of the Supreme High Command dated 19 January 1945, the troops who participated in the liberation of Krakow are thanked and a salute was given in Moscow by 24 artillery salvoes from 324 guns.

On January 24 the city of Oppeln was taken. By January 28 the Dąbrowa Coal Basin and the city of Katowice had been cleared of German forces and, in recognition of their roles, the 396th Regiment won the city's name as an honorific, while on April 5 the 497th and 791st Regiments would both receive the Order of Alexander Nevsky. As of February 1 the division was under direct command of 59th Army.

=== Upper Silesian Offensive ===
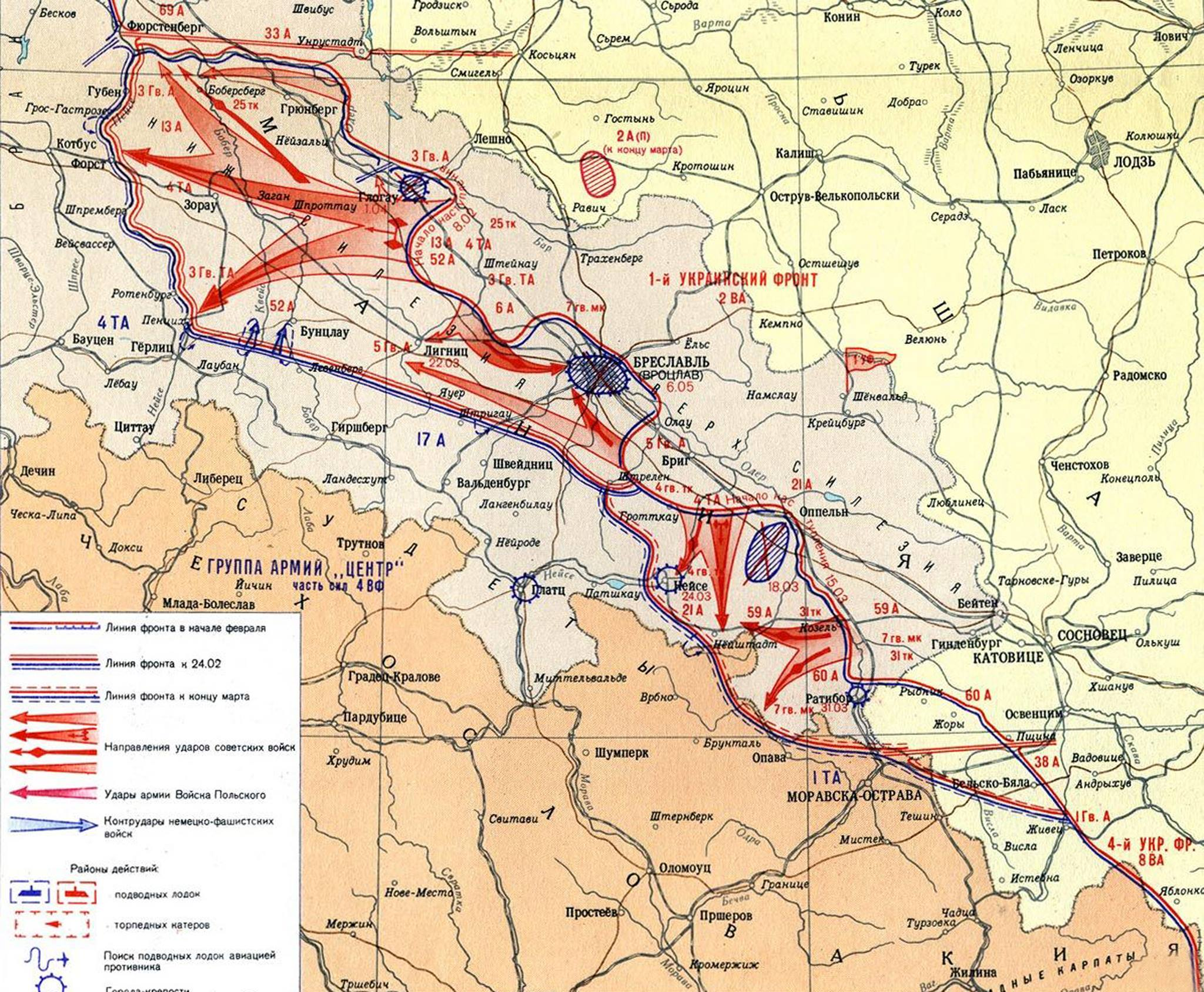
Upper Silesian Offensive. Note position of 59th Army.

In late February the 135th returned to 115th Corps. The Front commander, Marshal I. S. Konev, completed his Lower Silesian Offensive by February 24, after which he began laying plans for a new offensive into upper Silesia. Upon the arrival of his Front's main group of forces in the Neisse area the 59th and 60th Armies were to develop the attack from the bridgehead north of Ratibor to the west and southwest. Ultimately this operation would encircle and destroy the German group of forces in the Oppeln salient. The commander of 59th Army, Lt. Gen. I. T. Korovnikov, chose to launch his main attack along the left flank with the forces of 115th and 93rd Rifle Corps and 7th Guards Mechanized Corps in the general direction of Kostenthal and Zultz. At this time the personnel strength of the Army's divisions varied from 4,366 to 6,690 men and women. The commander of 115th Corps, Maj. Gen. S. B. Kozachek, placed his 92nd and 135th Divisions in first echelon with the 245th Rifle Division in second echelon. The Corps was to launch its main attack along the left flank in the direction of Lenschutz, Oberglogau, Repsch and Wiesengrund to break through the German defense along a 3km-wide sector and by day's end capture the line Nesselwitz–Groenweide in cooperation with 7th Guards Mechanized.

The offensive on the 59th and 60th Army's sector began at 0850 hours on March 15 following an 80-minute artillery preparation, and went largely according to plan although more slowly than expected. The main German defense zone was broken through on a 12km front and the Armies advanced 6-8km during the day. Bad weather prevented air support before noon, and the advancing forces also had to repel ten counterattacks. In response Konev ordered that the advance continue through the night. During the day on March 16 the 59th Army managed to advance another 3-9km, and the 93rd Rifle and 7th Guards Mechanized Corps cleared the entire depth of the German defenses while setting the stage for the success of the attack over the next two days. By the end of March 17 these two Corps had reached the line Tomas–Schenau–Kittledorf while the 115th covered against flank attacks from the north. The slow advance of the Corps over the latter half of March 16 and all of March 17 was later blamed on General Kozachek who exaggerated the strength of German resistance, failed to make sufficient demands on his subordinates, allowed the artillery to lag behind, and failed to continue attacking through the night. Konev personally visited the 59th Army headquarters on the 17th and directed that the 115th be deployed to the northwest to capture Oberglogau and facilitate the advance of the 93rd and 7th Guards Corps. To do so he ordered the 245th to join the 135th and 92nd; by the end of March 18 the Corps was to link up with 21st Army in the Elgut area. During that day 59th Army's offensive unfolded more successfully. The encirclement of the German Oppeln grouping was completed and the divisions of 115th Corps had to repel numerous counterattacks by small subunits of infantry and tanks trying to break out to the south from Oberglogau and Friedersdorf, after which it seized Walzen and reached the southern outskirts of the other two towns. The encircled forces consisted of the 20th SS, 168th and 344th Infantry Divisions, part of the 18th SS Panzergrenadier Division, and several independent regiments and battalions.

With the encirclement completed the 115th Corps was tasked with preventing the encircled grouping from breaking out to the south, while the 135th and 245th Divisions attacked to clear Oberglogau and reach the line Kreenbusch–Rosenberg. This was assisted by most of 7th Guards Mechanized and 93rd Rifle Corps. The German command was now making efforts to pull its encircled forces out toward the west, including a break-in attempt by the Hermann Göring Panzer Division towards Steinau. At 0830 hours on March 19, after a 10-minute fire onslaught, the 115th Corps attacked, splitting the defenders and capturing Krappitz and Oberglogau plus several wooded areas. The next day the remnants of the trapped force tried to break out toward Steinau, but were unsuccessful, while the 115th Corps mopped up the Kreenbusch area. Late in the day the 59th Army began regrouping to continue the offensive. The total German casualties in the encirclement battle were 30,000 killed, 15,000 prisoners, 21 aircraft, 57 tanks and assault guns and 464 guns of various calibers. On March 21 the 59th Army resumed its advance in the direction of Jägerndorf which it reached but did not take on March 31. Due to the toll of casualties during the offensive and inadequate supplies of ammunition, the Army was ordered to go over to the defense. On April 26 the 396th Rifle Regiment would receive the Order of Alexander Nevsky, while the 497th and 791st Regiments would both be awarded the Order of Bogdan Khmelnitsky, 2nd Degree, for their roles in the fighting southwest of Oppeln.

== Postwar ==
In a final transfer the 135th was moved in April to the 22nd Rifle Corps of 6th Army, which was besieging the city of Breslau. The city had been encircled during the Lower Silesian offensive, but managed to hold out until May 6. The division was still there when the shooting stopped. On June 4 it received the Order of the Red Banner for its part in the siege. The men and women of the division now shared the full title of 135th Rifle, Krakow, Order of the Red Banner Division. (Russian: 135-я стрелковая Краковская Краснознамённая дивизия.)

According to STAVKA Order No. 11096 of May 29, part 8, the 135th was listed as one of those divisions to be "disbanded in place". In accordance to this directive the division was disbanded in July.
