= Operation Büffel =

Planned retreat by the German army in March 1943 on the Eastern front

- Part of the Eastern Front of World War II and Bandenbekämpfung
- Phased withdrawal of the German 4th and 9th Armies from the Rzhev salient, 1–22 March 1943
- Operational scope: Strategic retreat, scorched earth, and civilian deportation
- Location: Rzhev–Vyazma salient, Russian SFSR, Soviet Union
- Commanded by: Walter Model; Günther von Kluge
- Target: Shortening the front line and freeing up defensive reserves
- Date: March 1 – March 22, 1943
- Executed by: (Nazi Germany) Army Group Center: 4th Army; 9th Army
- Outcome: German success
- Casualties: Minimal German combat losses

Operation Büffel ("Buffalo") was a series of planned retreats conducted by the German Army Group Centre on the Eastern Front during the period 1–22 March 1943. This movement eliminated the Rzhev Salient and shortened the front by 230 miles (370 km), releasing twenty-one divisions. The withdrawals were accompanied by a ruthless security campaign, resulting in widespread destruction, deportation of the able-bodied population for slave labour, and killings of civilians.

This advance is known in Soviet historiography as the Rzhev-Vyazma Offensive (1943), ending on March 31.

== Operational history ==
The 9th Army evacuated the Rzhev Salient in March 1943, as part of a general shortening of the line. Large-scale security sweeps, under the doctrine of Bandenbekämpfung ("bandit fighting"), were carried out in the weeks before the operation, in which an estimated 3,000 Russians were killed, the great majority of whom were unarmed, as shown by the inventory of the seized weapons: 277 rifles, 41 pistols, 61 machine guns, 17 mortars, 9 antitank rifles and 16 small artillery pieces. The withdrawal itself took two weeks, with minimal casualties or disruption in a move of an Army group numbering approximately 250,000 men, 100 tanks and 400 artillery pieces. In its wake, 9th Army leader Walter Model personally ordered the deportation of all male civilians, wells poisoned, and at least two dozen villages razed in a scorched earth policy to hinder the Red Army's follow up in the area.

== Soviet reaction ==
The Red Army had been planning to attack the salient. On February 6, 1943, the Stavka issued directive No. 30043 on the preparation of an offensive on the central section of the Soviet-German front to encircle and destroy the main forces of Army Group Center.

On February 18, preparations for retreat by the German troops were discovered by the reconnaissance of the Western Front, and on February 23 of the Kalinin Front. Reports said that some groups of the enemy were moving towards the West, some of the artillery was pulled closer to the roads, and some dugouts, bridges, buildings and railway line were being prepared for demolition. Despite these reports, the Soviet command reacted slowly. The Commander of the 30th Army, Vladimir Kolpakchi, only gave the order to advance on March 2 at 14:30. At 17:15 that day, a directive from the Stavka ordered all troops of the Kalinin and Western Fronts to advance.

On the morning of March 3, 1943, Soviet troops entered the city of Rzhev without meeting any resistance. On March 4, Soviet troops took control of Olenino, and then Gzhatsk (March 5), Sychyovka (March 8), Bely (March 10) and Vyazma (March 12).

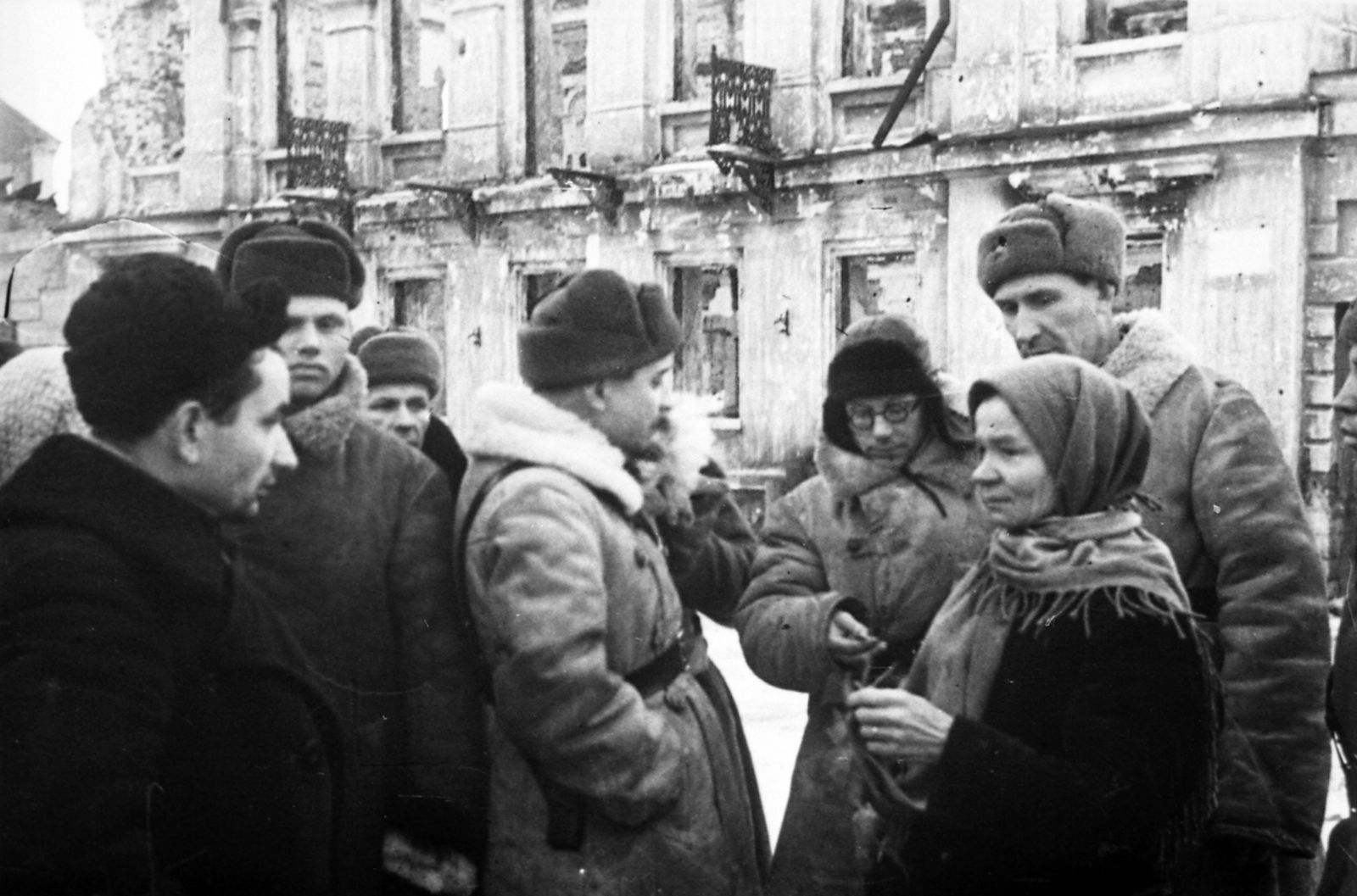
Soviet soldiers talking with locals after the liberation of Rzhev, 4 March. On the far right is Sergey Komarov, former commissar of the 2nd Rzhev Partisan Detachment

The pursuit of the enemy troops was complicated by well-equipped defensive positions, minefields and destroyed communications. Some parts of the Red Army managed to advance only 6-7 km per day. In the second half of March, Western Front troops tried to cut off German units from the Orlov-Bryansk group, but after several days of fighting, losing 132 tanks, the 1st and 5th Tank Corps of the Red Army stopped the attacks. On March 22, 1943, Soviet troops reached the new defensive line where the troops of the army group "Center" were entrenched. Faced with intense resistance and as a result of the reduction in the supply of ammunition and food due to the distance from their supply bases, the Red Army was forced to stop the offensive.

== Effects ==
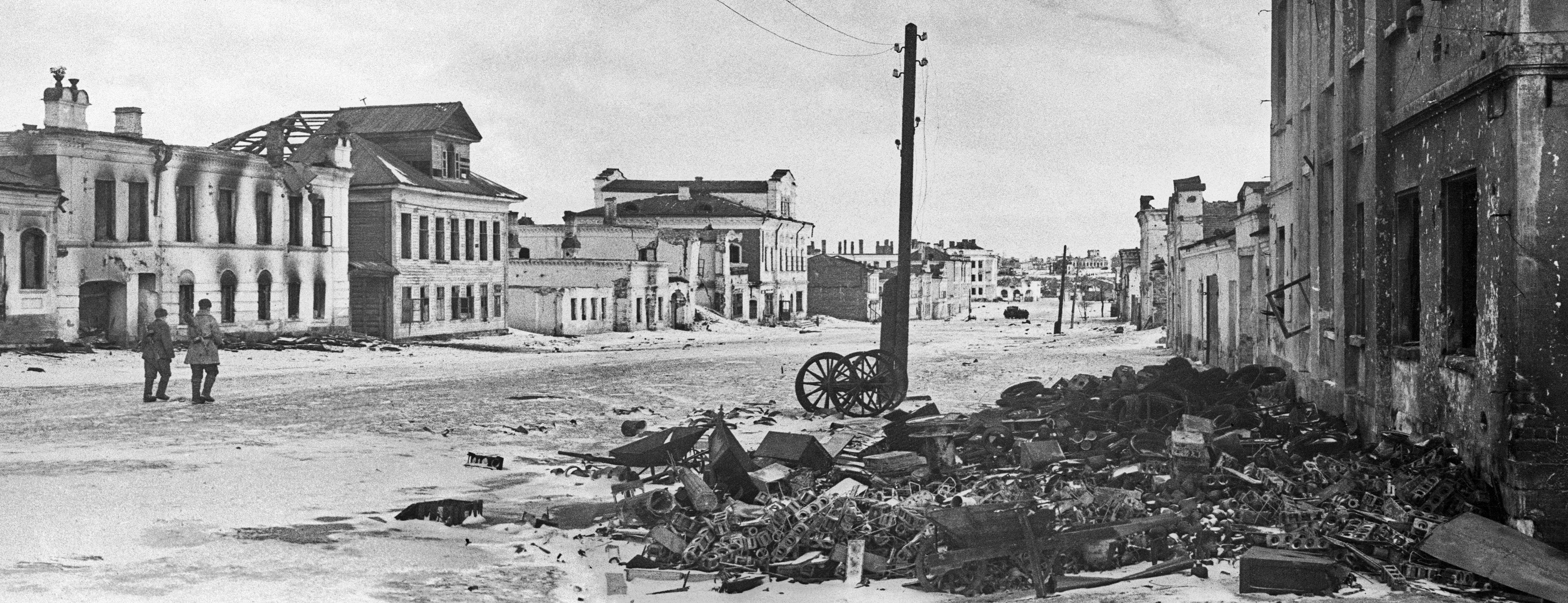
A street in Rzhev after liberation showing German destruction of buildings

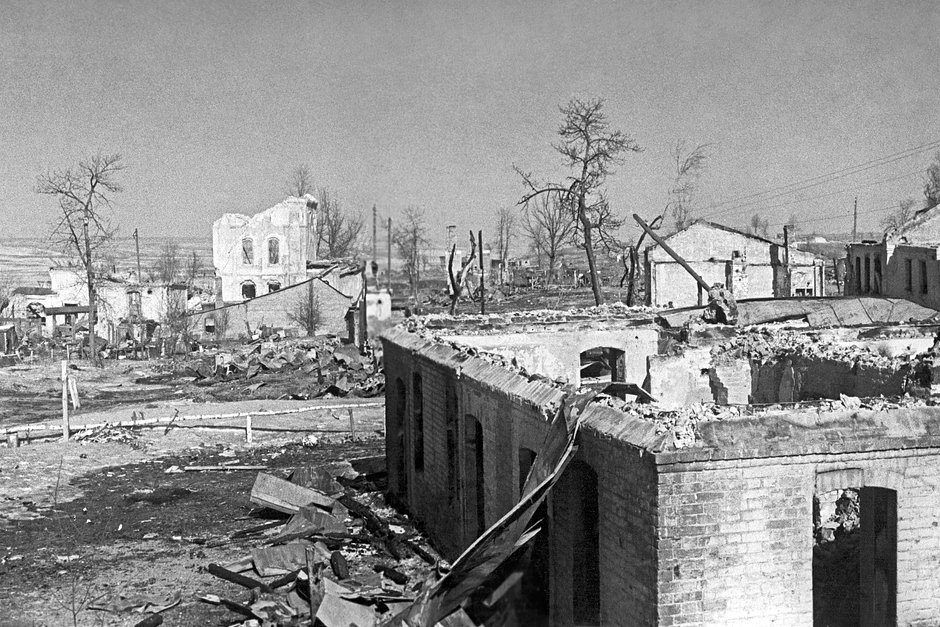
German destruction of buildings in Dorogobuzh

The shortening of the German lines allowed the Germans to create a reserve for operations elsewhere. These formations were later used during the 1943 summer campaign, resulting in the Battle of Kursk.

The official Soviet report published on 7 April 1943 showed the effects of the German scorched earth policy. In Viazma, out of 5,500 buildings, only 51 small houses were still standing; at Gzhatsk, 300 out of 1,600; in Rzhev, 500 out of 5,400. 15,000 people were deported from the three towns alone. The rural areas suffered equally; in the Sychevka area, for example, 137 villages out of 248 had been burned down. British war correspondent Alexander Werth visited the area soon after the liberation and saw for himself the results of Model's orders. The report listed Model at the top of the list of the war criminals responsible for the "deliberate extermination policy" and noted that most of the killings of civilians were carried out by regular Wehrmacht units, not just the Gestapo or the SD.

== See also ==
- Heuaktion – 1944 Nazi program of kidnapping children for slave labour

== Bibliography ==
- Newton, Steven H. (2006). Hitler's Commander: Field Marshal Walter Model – Hitler's Favorite General. Cambridge, MA: Da Capo. ISBN 978-0-306-81399-3.
- Werth, Alexander (1964). Russia at War 1941–1945. New York, NY: E.P. Dutton & Co.
