= 108th Rifle Division =

108th Rifle Division (July 1940 – June 1946)
- Active: 1940–1946
- Country: Soviet Union
- Branch: Red Army (1939-46)
- Type: Infantry
- Size: Division
- Engagements: Operation Barbarossa; Battle of Białystok–Minsk; Battle of Smolensk (1941); Battle of Moscow; Battles of Rzhev; First Rzhev-Sychyovka Operation; Operation Kutuzov; Gomel-Rechitsa operation Rogachev-Bykhov operation Operation Bagration; Bobruysk offensive Lublin–Brest offensive Vistula–Oder offensive East Pomeranian offensive Battle of Berlin
- Decorations: Order of Lenin; Order of the Red Banner
- Battle honours: Bobruysk

Commanders
- Notable commanders: Maj. Gen. Aleksandr Ivanovich Mavrichev; Maj. Gen. Nikolai Ivanovich Orlov; Maj. Gen. Ivan Ivanovich Birichev; Col. Vasilii Grigorevich Terentev; Col. Andrei Trofimovich Stuchenko; Col. Grigorii Ivanovich Sinitsyn; Maj. Gen. Pyotr Alekseevich Teremov

The 108th Rifle Division was first formed as an infantry division of the Red Army in mid-1940, in the reserves of the Western Special Military District, based on the shtat (table of organization and equipment) of September 1939. By the spring of 1941 it was stationed in Belarus, and at the outbreak of the war with Germany it was near Minsk, where it became encircled in the first week. A cadre of about 1,200 personnel were able to escape toward the Dniepr River. From there they retreated to the vicinity of Yartsevo, where they came under command of what was soon known as Group Rokossovskii, tasked with holding open the gap that led to the armies of Western Front pocketed around Smolensk. Once the survivors escaped in early August the division remained in the line along the Vop River, being substantially rebuilt during September as part of 16th Army. During Operation Typhoon the 108th was encircled along with the rest of its Army but managed to escape with about one-third of its strength. During November it was again replenished to about two-third strength, and was brought up to reinforce 5th Army during the final German push on Moscow, again suffering heavy losses. In the first days of December it joined in the general counteroffensive and pushed forward to the Ruza River, and later took part in the liberation of Mozhaysk in January 1942. Through most of that year it was deployed on the east side of the Rzhev salient, playing a relatively small part in the offensives against German 9th Army and followed up the German withdrawal as part of 10th Army in March 1943. It then returned to 16th Army, which was redesignated as 11th Guards Army prior to the July offensive against the Oryol salient. Once 9th Army was also driven out of this salient the 108th advanced through eastern Ukraine and into eastern Belarus as part of 50th Army, and spent the winter in the battles around Gomel and Rahachow as part of 1st Belorussian Front. In the reorganization of April 1944 the division was transferred to 3rd Army of the same Front. It the first days of the summer offensive it attacked toward and helped to clear the city of Babruysk, winning its name as a battle honor. In July it was transferred to 65th Army, where it remained into the postwar. In November the Army was transferred to 2nd Belorussian Front and under these commands the 108th fought through northern Poland in the winter of 1945, winning a rare Order of Lenin for breaking through the German defenses north of Warsaw. After playing an important role in the capture of Danzig in March it moved west to the Oder River, which it crossed during the final offensive into central Germany. For its service in this operation the division was awarded the Order of the Red Banner. Following the German surrender it became part of the Northern Group of Forces in Poland until it was disbanded in June 1946.

== Formation ==
The 108th Rifle Division was formed in July 1940 in accordance with a People's Commissariat of Defense directive dated 6 July 1940 in the Western Special Military District. The directive called for the formation of the division, to be based at Vyazma with an authorized strength of 3,000 personnel, by 15 August. The division lacked a howitzer artillery regiment on formation, with the directive forming the division promising that the division would receive its organic howitzer regiment after receiving the necessary equipment in 1941. Col. Alexey Ilyich Muravyov, commander of the 121st Rifle Division, was appointed to command the division in July 1940. The 108th reached a strength of around 2,700 of its authorized 3,000 by 1 November, fielding above its authorized strength in artillery, machine guns, and horses but only half of its authorized motor transport. As of 6 November 1940 the division was located as follows, with its headquarters at Vyazma:

- 407th Rifle Regiment (Vyazma)
- 444th Rifle Regiment (Dorogobuzh)
- 539th Rifle Regiment (Gzhatsk)
- 575th Light Artillery Regiment (Sychyovka)
- 485th Separate Signal Battalion (Vyazma)
- 220th Separate Reconnaissance Battalion (Vyazma)
- 172nd Separate Sapper Battalion (Dorogobuzh)
- 157th Separate Medical/Sanitation Battalion (Vyazma)
- 458th Separate Anti-Aircraft Artillery Battalion (Sychyovka)
- 152nd Separate Anti-Tank Battalion (Sychyovka)
- 188th Motor Transport Company (Vyazma)
- Military Prosecutor's Office (Vyazma)

Muravyov was transferred to command the new 209th Motorized Division in March 1941 and replaced on March 1 by Maj. Gen. Aleksandr Ivanovich Mavrichev. This officer had previously led the 33rd and 121st Rifle Divisions. As of May 30 the division was subordinated to 44th Rifle Corps in the reserves of the Western Special Military District, and its order of battle was as follows:

- 407th Rifle Regiment
- 444th Rifle Regiment
- 539th Rifle Regiment
- 575th Artillery Regiment
- 152nd Antitank Battalion (from January 25, 1942)
- 273rd Antiaircraft Battery (later 458th Antiaircraft Battalion, until February 20, 1943)
- 220th Reconnaissance Company
- 172nd Sapper Battalion
- 485th Signal Battalion (later 409th Signal Company)
- 157th Medical/Sanitation Battalion
- 155th Chemical Defense (Anti-gas) Platoon
- 188th Motor Transport Company (later 93rd)
- 278th Field Bakery
- 153rd Divisional Veterinary Hospital
- 1548th Field Postal Station
- 381st Field Office of the State Bank

Immediately upon news of the German invasion on June 22 the division and its Corps, which also included the 64th Rifle Division, was subordinated to Lt. Gen. P. M. Filatov's 13th Army, which formed the second echelon of the redesignated Western Front. The 108th was located directly northwest of Minsk.

== Battle of Białystok–Minsk ==
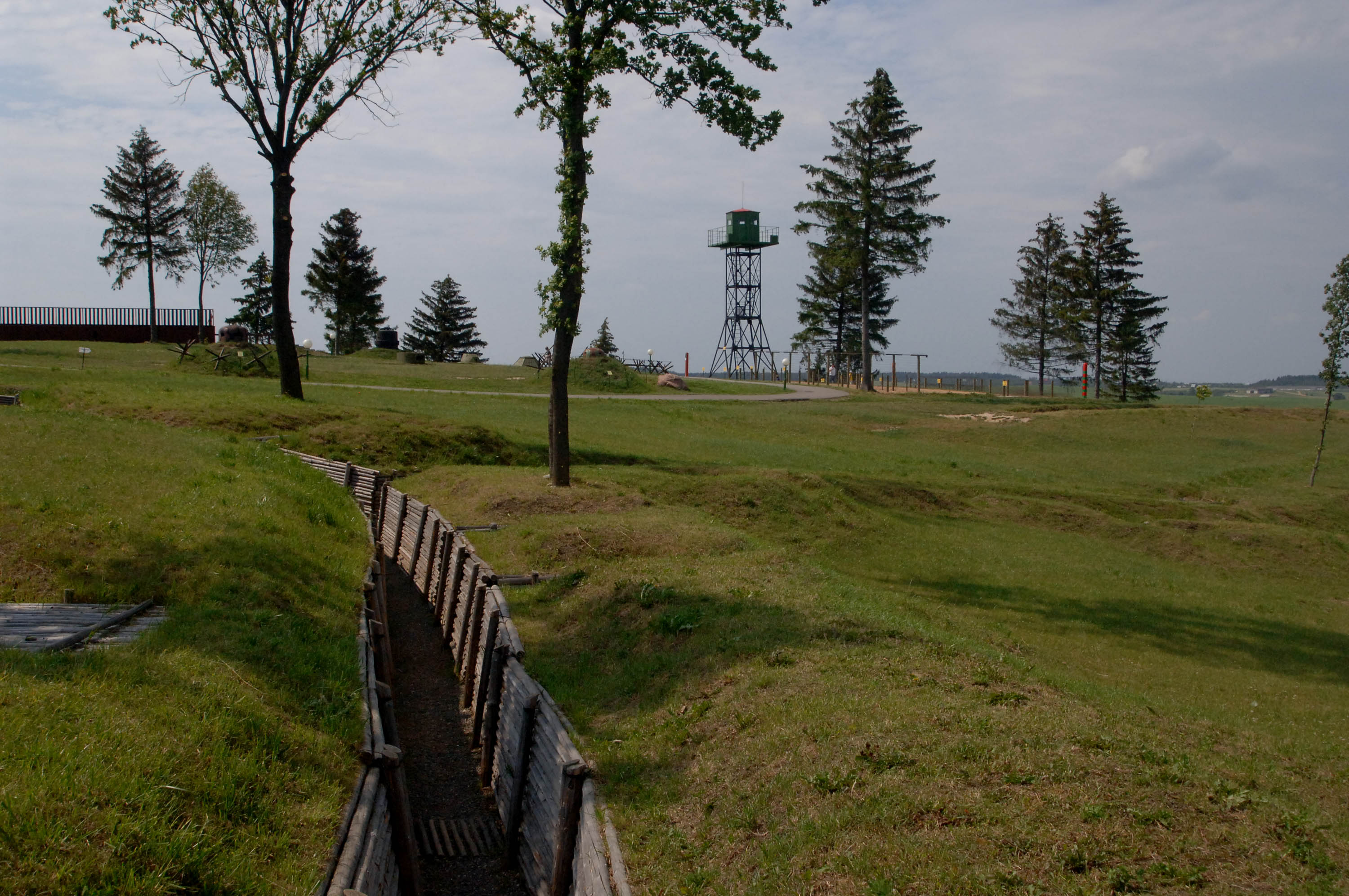
Preserved section of the Stalin Line near Minsk

On June 24 the 407th and 444th Rifle Regiments, with one battalion of the 575th Artillery and an attached battalion of Corps artillery moved forward to a 40km-wide sector of the Stalin Line on the pre-1939 Polish border. The 539th Regiment was still regrouping near Minsk. A considerable portion of the division's artillery and antitank guns were at disposal of the Corps, it was short of other equipment and ammunition, and it had not received the required transport from the civilian economy to move supplies unloaded from trains to the rear. Once sorted out on June 27 the 539th was ordered to take up defenses along the Ptsich River separate from the rest of the division in order to cover Minsk from the southwest. The next day the division was encircled in the Minsk pocket.

General Mavrichev withdrew what remained of the main body of the division to the area of Staroye Selo on June 29 while isolated units continued to hold out in the Stalin Line. The commander of 3rd Army, Lt. Gen. V. I. Kuznetsov, with part of his headquarters, was emerging from encirclement farther west the next day, and linked up with the 108th and 64th and began leading them out of the pocket overnight on July 1/2 in the direction of Babruysk and Gomel. Approximately 1,200 personnel of the 108th emerged from the trap, without any heavy equipment. Mavrichev became separated from most of his troops and on July 12 was replaced in command by Maj. Gen. Nikolai Ivanovich Orlov, the deputy commander of 44th Corps. Mavrichev's remaining group of 45 men were scattered by a German attack on August 15. With six others he linked up with a partisan group led by the former commander of the 64th, Col. S. I. Iovlev, and eventually reached Red Army lines on September 26 near Bely.

== Battle of Smolensk ==
The XXXXVI Motorized Corps reached the Berezina River on July 2 and forced crossings at and south of Pogost, on the approaches to Mogilev, with the 10th and the SS Das Reich Motorized Divisions. The southern bridgehead was contested for two days by the remnants of 13th Army's 108th, 64th, 100th, and 161st Rifle Divisions, plus two units of 4th Army. By the end of July 7 the XXXXVI Corps was still only halfway between the Berezina and the Dniepr. By July 10 the 44th Corps included the 17th Rifle Division and was under direct command of Western Front, now led by Marshal S. K. Timoshenko.

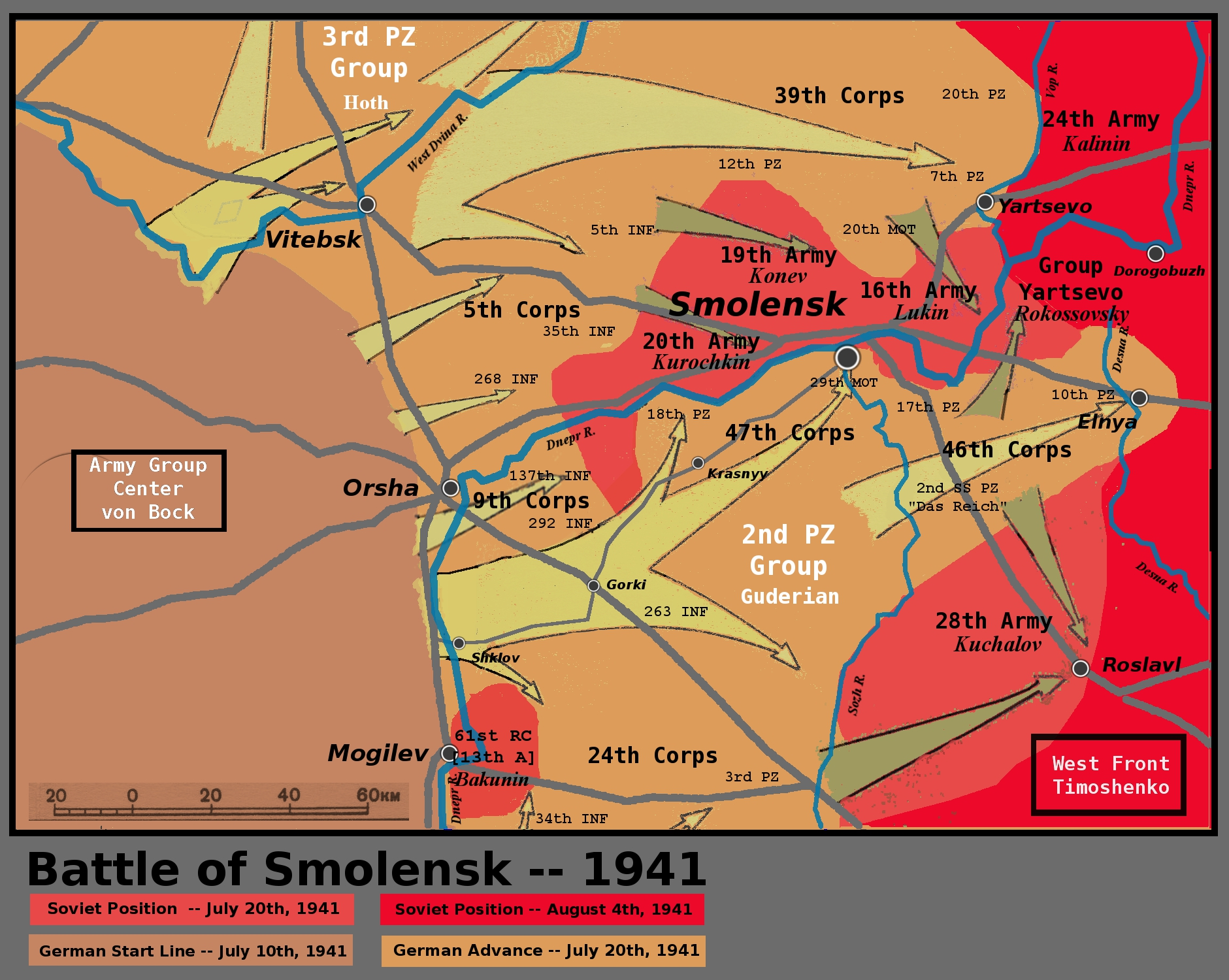
Battle of Smolensk. Note position of Group Yartsevo.

By July 17 the lead elements of 2nd and 3rd Panzer Groups were close to completing the encirclement of the 16th, 19th, and 20th Armies in and around Smolensk. In order to keep a gap open to the pocket the STAVKA formed Group Yartsevo, under command of Lt. Gen. K. K. Rokossovskii, which would initially consist of 44th Corps. The Corps now contained the remnants of its earlier divisions which had withdrawn to the Yartsevo area, plus the 25th Rifle Corps, 23rd Mechanized Corps, an artillery regiment and a few companies of T-26 tanks. Timoshenko, now in command of the Western Direction, ordered Rokossovskii to

...organize an antitank region in the vicinity of Zuevo, Gavrilovo, and Grishino regions and deploy it to defend the Iartsevo bridgehead and along the Dnepr River in the Iartsevo and Pridneprovskaia [along the Dniepr] to prevent the enemy fron penetrating from the Dukhovshchina region to Smolensk.

The Group became operational that day although initially it had just a pair of truck-mounted quad PM M1910 machine guns, a radio van, and a few staff officers, all of which got out of Yartsevo just ahead of 7th Panzer Division.

Rokossovskii strengthened his Group by assembling rear echelon units from the armies in the pocket, combat units that had become separated from their main units, and a large number of stragglers. An important arrival was the 38th Rifle Division, which was assigned to contain 7th Panzer; this fight continued for five days. Also joining the Group was the 101st Tank Division with about 220 tanks of mostly older types, the 107th Tank Division (former 69th Motorized Division), and the 108th and 64th Divisions, both significantly understrength. Stalin had given orders that Smolensk was to be held at all costs, which prevented Timoshenko from evacuating the pocket. Rokossovskii mounted many limited counterattacks which led the German command to believe his Group was stronger than it actually was. This was expanded on July 21 with orders from Western Front to join a larger counteroffensive against the German pincers two days later, although the 108th was not included in these plans. Instead, Timoshenko ordered the division, along with the 64th, the 44th Corps headquarters, and several other units, to be withdrawn to the Gzhatsk and Medyn region for rebuilding and resupply.

Before this could be implemented further orders directed the 108th and 64th, reinforced by a sapper company, to attack 7-15km south of Yartsevo to cover the left flank of Group Rokossovskii and reach a position some 12-17km to the west by July 29. The 108th was to be followed by 7th Mechanized Corps in an advance toward Dukhovshchina. The 152nd Antitank Battalion was to defend the crossing over the Vop at Pishchino with two guns. The main force of the division forced a crossing at 0900 hours that day following an artillery preparation, and took the west edge of the of wooded areas east of Bolshie and Malye Gorki and Zadnia with the 539th Regiment. From here the division was to capture crossings over the Dniepr in conjunction with the 229th Rifle Division inside the pocket. All this was in aid of the trapped armies in their breakout from the pocket. For this purpose the 288th Rifle Regiment of 64th Division and much of the 101st Tanks were subordinated to Orlov's command. The objective was to open the road through Solovevo so 20th Army could be resupplied with fuel and ammunition.

The attack toward Solovevo on August 1 proved a failure, so Timoshenko authorized a breakout by 16th and 20th Armies, couched in language of an "attack" toward Dukhovshchina. This began in earnest overnight on August 2/3, battling with or evading company-size strongpoints of the 20th Motorized Division. By 1025 hours on August 3 he finally referred to the operation as a withdrawal, and radioed to the trapped forces:

The immediate mission is to destroy the enemy battalion which is disrupting the supply of ammunition and fuel to the Hill 165.9, Pnevo, and Mit'kovo region [5-9km southwest of Solovevo] and help 108th Rifle Division crush the enemy southwest of Zadnia [1km west of Solovevo], after protecting the arrival of all supply units to the eastern bank of the Dnepr in the Solov'evo sector and the Ratchino crossing.

At 2000 he reported that Group Rokossovskii was fighting along the west bank of the Vop but was unable to advance further.

Timoshenko sent new attack orders to all his forces at 2225 hours on August 4. While 16th and 20th Armies were to continue to withdraw behind the Dniepr, Group Rokossovskii was to attack with its left wing (including the 108th) toward Zadnia and Grishino to protect the arrival of the latter at the Solovevo and Pishchino crossings. The crossing operations were well underway by 0130 on August 5. Rokossovskii now ordered his commanders to cease attacking and organize more coherent defenses from Yartsevo to the area where 20th Army was reassembling. He defined specific sectors against the possibility of a renewed German offensive. 44th Corps, with an attached antitank regiment, was to "occupy and firmly defend a belt with its forward edge in the Marker 169.9, Skrushevskoe Farm, and Pereles'e sector along the eastern bank of the Vop' River and its left flank anchored on the Dnepr River." In all, some 50,000 of an original 220,000 men in the pocket were able to escape.

=== Dukhovshchina Offensives ===
Within days Group Rokossovskii was redesignated as the new 16th Army. By August 12, Timoshenko's intelligence indicated that Army Group Center was weakening its forces east and northeast of Smolensk for a new offensive from the Roslavl area. He urged the STAVKA to conduct a new offensive to retake Dukhovshchina and Smolensk with four of his armies (not including the 16th). This was ordered by the STAVKA to being on August 17. Rokossovskii had already been making repeated attacks in the Yartsevo area, and was to assault again on August 16 to divert attention from the rest of the Front. 64th Division was to turn its sector over to the 108th, which was to "occupy and firmly defend the Hill 207.2, Iartsevo, Skrushevskie, and Buianovo sector" with the 38th Division, while also covering the left flank of 19th Army as it advanced. In the Front's operational summary at 2000 hours on August 16 the 108th was reported as having "repelled and dispersed two enemy companies attacking from Zadnia toward Solov'evo with artillery and machine gun fire" that morning. It was fortifying the east bank of the Vop on the Marker 169.9 and Buianovo sector. The attack had come from the 28th Infantry Division of VIII Army Corps.

The STAVKA ordered a new offensive on August 25. 16th Army was to assist 19th and 20th Armies by attacking west toward Smolensk beginning on August 30 with its 152nd, 38th, 108th, and 144th Rifle Divisions. In the event this was postponed to September 1. On August 30 General Orlov was specifically ordered to "...be prepared to attack toward Svishchevo and Podroshch'e on the morning of 2 September." The division had the 1st Battalion of 49th Cannon Artillery Regiment in support. Rokossovskii's shock group was formed from the 1st Tank and 152nd Rifle Divisions plus two regiments of the 38th on a 5km-wide sector facing one regiment of the 28th Infantry. The 108th's attack across the Vop was in a supporting role. The shock group went in at 0700 hours on September 1 and made some gains in the face of heavy German fire as they were "conducting a fighting withdrawal toward the west."

For September 2, 16th Army was to attack at 1000 hours, with the 108th tasked to "capture the Minino and Chadovishchi line [15km south-southwest of Yartsevo] and subsequently attack toward Kartyshi [21km southwest of Yartsevo]." By 1700 it was reported as being in "sustained combat in the Svishchevo and Zadnia sector on the western bank of the Vop' River." The shock group gained no more than 2km against effective artillery and mortar fire. The offensive, which was already running out of steam, resumed at 1400 on September 3, and the 108th was said to be "fighting in its previous positions." For the next day it was to defend Skrushevskie Farm with one regiment while attacking with the other two to take the line from Svishchevo to Bolshie Gorki, and subsequently toward Podroshe. This was to begin at noon following a 15 minute artillery preparation. According to the operational summary by Western Front at 2000 the division made no progress at all.

The offensive was reduced to just the 16th and 19th Armies on September 5, and the 108th was directed to defend its sector while also leaving "reinforced combat security posts" on the west bank of the Vop. Personnel losses now amounted to about 30 percent of the Army's strength since September 1, but despite this Timoshenko directed both Armies to resume fighting on September 6, although the 108th remained in its defensive role. This was expanded on September 9 to heighten the reconnaissance role of the combat security posts to detect any German movements or regroupings. Western Front went over to the defense the next day.

== Operation Typhoon ==
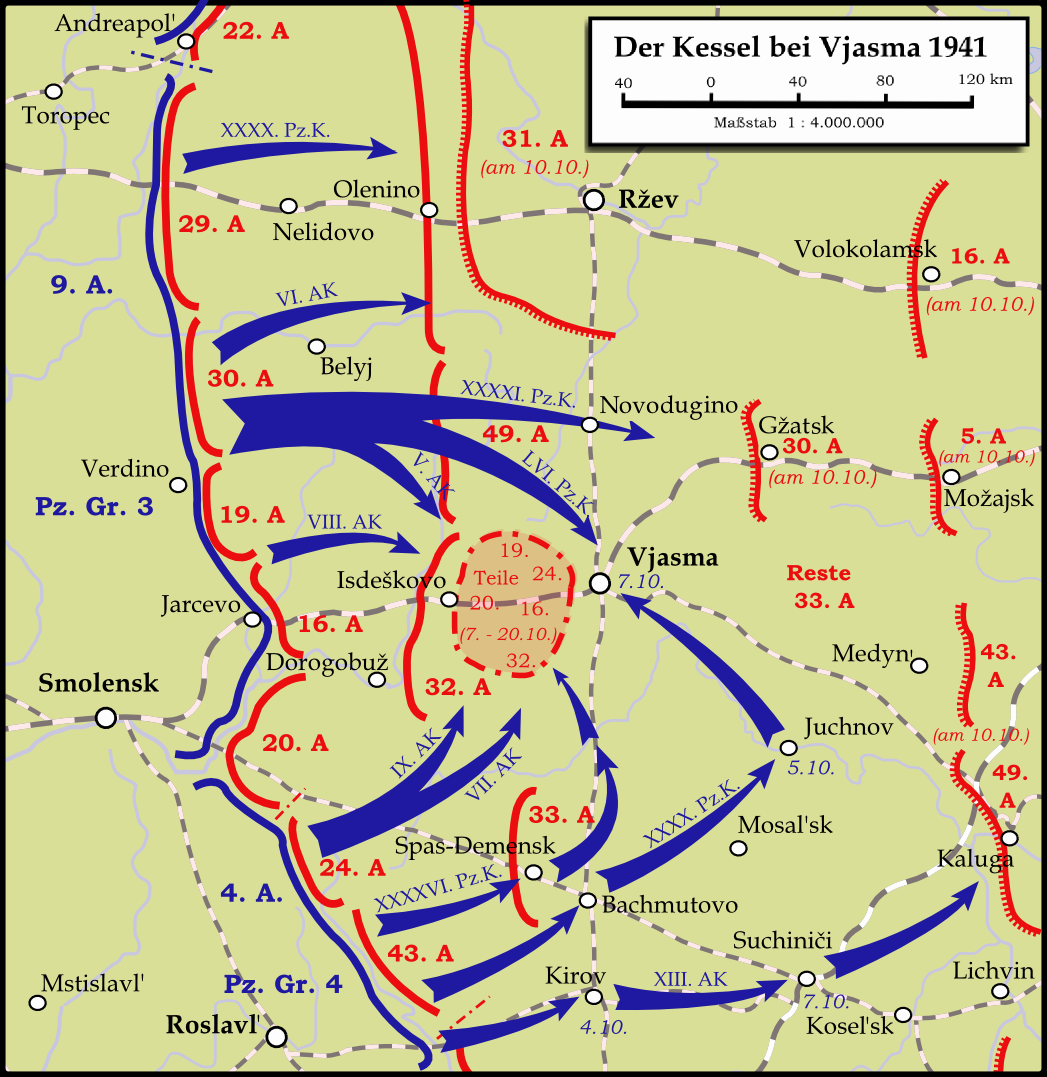
Operation Typhoon (northern sector). Note initial position of 16th Army.

Later in September the 108th received substantial reinforcements, and by October 1 it had 10,095 personnel on strength, armed in part with 229 machine guns, 43 artillery pieces and mortars, but no antitank or antiaircraft guns at all. Rokossovskii had presented a plan of defense on September 27 to the new commander of Western Front, Col. Gen. I. S. Konev, in anticipation of a new German offensive against Moscow. The former had given considerable thought to German methods of breaking through a defense and anticipated that his troops could be forced to make a fighting withdrawal. Konev overruled this, stating:

Your plan doesn't reflect the tasks of a tenacious defense; on the contrary, the staged withdrawal from line to line foreseen by the plan gives indications of only a mobile defense. The withdrawal of the 112th Rifle Division on the Vop' River will expose the flank of the 50th Rifle Division...
I order:
1. Conduct a tenacious defense of the present line on the Vop' River... Fight stubbornly. Eliminate any thought of a mobile defense...

Rokossovskii was to revise his plan and resubmit it. In the event, the German offensive would begin on this sector at dawn on October 2, and Konev would soon be ordering his armies to withdraw.

The attack began with air strikes and artillery bombardments, making frequent use of smoke to create confusion about the chosen breakthrough sectors. Rokossovskii's headquarters reported:

1. At 7.00 2.10 the enemy initiated a hurricane of artillery and mortar fire on the sector Kholm (4 kilometres north of Yartsevo), Kudinovo, Pomogi. The fire was less intense on the rest of the front.
2. Our artillery quickly answered with counter-fire according to the previously developed plan. As a result of the entire power of our artillery fire, the enemy's attack has been disrupted, and his fire has been silenced.

The counter-battery fire came from the guns and mortars of the 108th, 112th, and 38th Divisions, plus 19th Army's 50th Division. While the attack was indeed disrupted, it was in fact only a feint by the 255th Infantry Division, and most of the shells fell on empty ground. The true attack came unexpectedly at the boundary between the 19th and 30th Armies farther north.

As chaos unfolded to its north and south the sector of 16th Army remained relatively calm, with light casualties. At 1220 hours on October 3 Rokossovskii reported an artillery preparation at 0830, followed by an attack on the 108th and 112th that was driven off. At OKH headquarters the chief of staff, Col. Gen. F. Halder, was complaining in his diary about the unauthorized and costly attack by the 255th Infantry, which he blamed on the ambition of the commander of XXVII Army Corps, Gen. A. Wäger. By the morning of October 3 Konev was finally beginning to grasp the true situation, as by now reconnaissance flights were reporting a German column 20km behind the former front line, with its head 22km farther on. He issued orders for a counterattack, but the main counterattack force, under Lt. Gen. I. V. Boldin, was 45-55km from the breakthrough sector.

By the end of October 5 the 7th Panzer Division had seized a bridgehead over the Dniepr just 40km southwest of Vyazma while the 10th Panzer Division was 45-50km from the same objective. Time was running out and at 0750 hours on October 6 the STAVKA finally sent retreat orders to the Armies by airplane. The 108th had been transferred to 20th Army as Rokossovskii's 16th Army headquarters was moving back to take command of a new Army near Vyazma itself. Army Gen. F. A. Yershakov was now leading 20th Army and issued his directives as Order 71/op on the same day. Orlov's men were to fall back via Prost, Markovo, and Dorogobuzh. Yershakov attempted to regulate the movement as best as possible:

... 8. All division commanders when planning the withdrawal must first anticipate the withdrawal of the artillery.
9. During the withdrawal of the covering units, all road structures, telephone and telegraph lines and similar objects... are to be destroyed.
10. Division and unit commanders are to arrange through local organs of authority and by administrative means the driving of cattle from the areas abandoned by the troops. All agricultural reserves from local resources, which cannot be evacuated, are to be destroyed.

For an army in contact with the enemy and about to be deeply encircled such directions were simply unrealistic. The new line of defense was designated as another section of the Dniepr some 50-55km to the rear. Konev failed to coordinate with Reserve Front to protect the junction of its 24th Army and his 20th. The 112th Division was to act as the rearguard.

Already at 1920 hours on October 6, Konev was adjusting his orders for the withdrawal, directing Yershakov to pull back overnight to a line from Grigorevo to Krasnoe. German forces detected the withdrawal and immediately set out to pursue, but were held up by rearguards, plus minefields near Yartsevo. However, 19th Army, which was farther east to begin with, pulled back at a faster pace leaving the 20th in a difficult position as German troops reached the highway, which it was using, forcing it to shift to the south. The back roads and the old Smolensk highway were jammed with rear-area transport of 24th Army. However, the German pursuit lessened as XXVII Corps was more interested in pressing east along the highway. Far to the rear, on the morning of October 7 the panzer groups linked up just west of Vyazma, encircling four Soviet armies. At this time the 108th was directed to assemble in the area of Chashchevo–Shcherbino prior to marching toward Panfilovo overnight on October 8/9.

According to Western Front's operational summary issued at 2000 hours on October 8 no report had been received from 20th Army during the day. Radio communications were intermittent throughout the Front, and a liaison officer sent to Yershakov had not returned. At 1745 several additional officers had been sent by U-2 aircraft with orders to speed up the withdrawal to Vyazma to take up a line from Shimonovo to Ugriumovo Station, 55km east of the city. In case German forces prevented this he was to fall back to a line south of Gzhatsk. That this would require moving at a pace of some 70km per day was overlooked, as was the fact that the encirclement had been completed. As desperation set in several headquarters began broadcasting in the clear; these messages were intercepted by German intelligence and gave away plans to break out in certain places.

Sometime between 1700 and 1900 the headquarters of 24th Army received an order from Yershakov that it was being subordinated to 20th Army in order to organize a breakout. His plan was to maintain an all-round defense as 20th Army broke out across a line from Vyazma to Volosta to Piatnitsa [20km in width]. By now discipline was breaking down, making any organized effort across such a wide front impossible. In addition, all three places were now firmly in German hands. Army Gen. G. K. Zhukov, the new commander of Reserve Front, now ordered all trapped forces: "In the course of 10 and 11 October, breach the enemy's line and at whatever cost escape the encirclement..." 20th and 24th Armies were to penetrate to the southeast, despite Konev's earlier orders to do so to the southwest. A radio link with Yershakov had been briefly established, over which he reported he planned to break out south of Vyazma.

By October 10 Army Group Center was becoming anxious to destroy the encircled armies so as to continue the advance on Moscow as the weather was already deteriorating. Over the next week individuals, small and larger groups managed to reach friendly lines. On October 18 General Orlov and about one-third of his original personnel escaped through the sector designated for 24th Army, near Dorokhovo. This was a substantially better result than most of the trapped divisions. By November 1 it was in the reserves of Western Front. On the same day Orlov was moved to command of the 82nd Motorized Rifle Division and was replaced by Maj. Gen. Ivan Ivanovich Birichev. Orlov would later lead the 5th Guards Rifle Corps and the 146th Rifle Division before moving to the educational establishment in May 1944. Birichev had led the 1st Moscow Proletarian Motorised Rifle Division before the war, and more recently the 103rd Rifle Division.

== Battle of Moscow ==
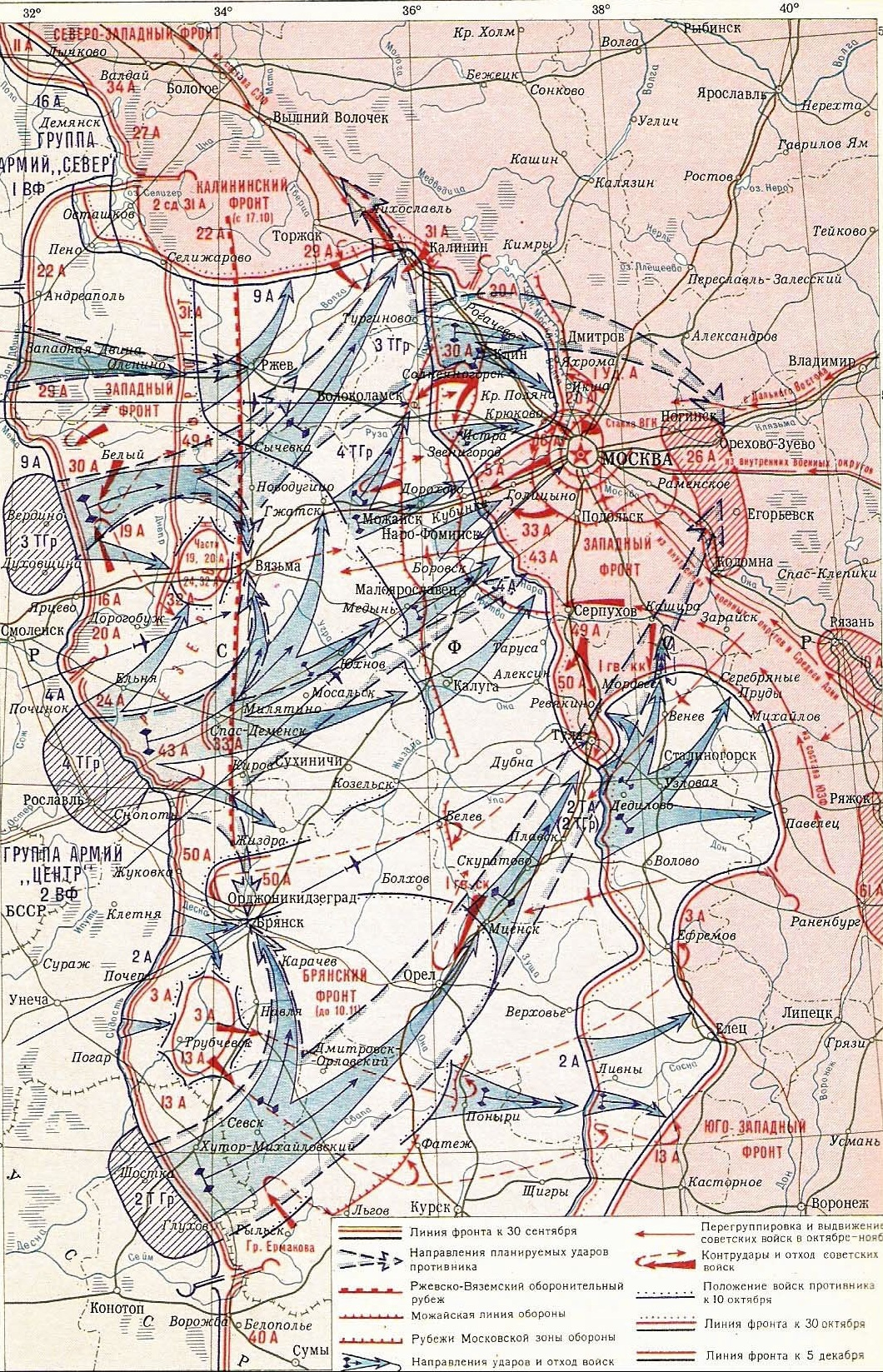
Battle of Moscow. Note position of 5th Army during late November and early December.

Later that month the 108th was in the Zvenigorod area and was partly replenished to 7,556 personnel, organized with two battalions in each rifle regiment. Apart from rifles it had a total of 16 submachine guns, 50 light machine guns, 50 heavy machine guns, 12 122mm howitzers, a single ZiS-30 tank destroyer, six antitank rifles, and 500 antitank grenades. Once the ground had frozen on November 15 the final German advance on Moscow began, led by the three panzer armies. West of the city the 16th and 5th Armies were fighting in close coordination as armored forces attempted to break through at the boundary. On November 20 units of 5th Army's 144th, 50th, and 129th Rifle Divisions had been pushed back, with the German divisions reaching a line from Toropenki to Dyadenkovo to Sergievo to Mikhailovskaya. Given this situation the command of Western Front assigned the 108th and the 145th Tank Brigade to the 5th and moved up them to the line Kotovo–Boriskovo–Nasonovo. Two machine gun battalions were also ordered to prepare a defensive line along the Istra River.

The most urgent object was to defend Istra; to this end the water level of the Istra River was raised 1-2m. The 108th and 145th Tanks fared poorly on November 21, being forced from four villages by the 87th Infantry Division before a counterattack retook part of Nasonovo. The remainder of 5th Army's units managed to consolidate and hold. On November 24 the 108th also gave ground just outside Istra, but regained its footing. On the same day it absorbed the remaining manpower of the 129th. In the evening of November 25 the division fell back to a line from Ivanovskoe–east of Petrovskoe–east of Funkovo, where it held the next day, helping to defend Istra with its right flank. During November 27 it came under heavy attack from the 252nd Infantry Division but managed to hold that day and the next.

From then until December 1 the positions of the main body the Army changed little as the German offensive concentrated on driving into Moscow from the northwest. During the first part of that day it was engaged again by the 87th and 78th Infantry Divisions and armor of 10th Panzer Division, again aiming for the boundary with 16th Army. The 108th and 144th, facing superior forces, were both forced from several strongpoints, and the 108th suffered heavy losses, being reduced to about 2,400 men. The attack continued overnight in the direction of Aksinino, attempting to wedge in between the 144th and what remained of the 108th. By noon on December 2 up to a regiment of infantry with tanks took Savkovo, 9km northeast of Zvenigorod, and began advancing eastward.

Overnight, the right flank of 5th Army continued fighting stubborn holding actions along the front Anosino–Aksinino–Yagunino, all even closer to Zvenigorod, while also preparing for the upcoming counteroffensive. During the morning of December 3 5th Army launched an attack to assist the left flank of 16th Army, during which Anosino changed hands four times. Overall the situation was stalemated. Fighting continued the next day as the offensive ran out of steam and several infiltrating groups were liquidated. The 108th again battled for Anosino with two German regiments and tanks. In a last gasp on December 4 the 87th and 252nd Infantry Divisions managed to push back units of the 108th and 144th and take Abushkovo and Pokrovskoe.

=== Counteroffensive to the Ruza ===
At dawn on December 5 the two Soviet divisions, supported by 40th Rifle Brigade, 20th Tank Brigade, and air support, went over to the attack and by day's end had retaken Gryazi, Zakharovo, Yurevo, Palitsy, and Abushkovo. German forces began to retreat from Padikovo and Pokrovskoe under cover of powerful artillery and mortar fire. The Red Army had now gained the initiative, and Army Group Center was left holding a huge bulge from the Moscow Sea to Dmitrov to Zvenigorod. By this time the strength of 5th Army had grown slightly to 35,000, and roughly the same proportion in artillery and armor. General Zhukov, now in command of Western Front, issued orders that called for 5th Army to defend initially as the Front's other armies on the right flank destroyed the German forces in the bulge.

5th Army joined the counteroffensive on December 10 and by the end of the next day the 108th, 144th, 19th and 329th Rifle Divisions had pierced the defenses of 252nd, 78th, 87th and 329th Infantry Divisions and reached the area of Lokotnya and Kolyubakovo. By now the German forces along the Nara River were near exhaustion and were vigorously digging into the frozen soil. On December 13 Western Front issued orders for a general offensive by the central sector armies (5th, 33rd, and 43rd). The primary objective was to pin the German forces to prevent them moving to the flanks, but the possibility of splitting the German front in half was a contingency. In previous days the right flank of 5th Army, in cooperation with 16th, was steadily moving to the west, forcing advanced German units to the rear and taking territory and equipment. Zhukov now reinforced the Army commander, Lt. Gen. of Artillery L. A. Govorov, with the 2nd Guards Cavalry Corps, giving it the task of operating in the German rear.

Five divisions of 5th Army, including the 108th, now intensified the counteroffensive with a series of quick blows against German strongpoints. Resistance was stubborn, based on defenses that had been prepared in the German rear. Anxious to avoid protracted fighting, late on December 13 the 2nd Guards Cavalry penetrated the German front between the 19th and 329th Divisions. Two days later the 108th was attacking from the area of Petrovskoe toward Lake Trostenskoe, while also maintaining the link between 5th and 16th Armies. The latter was now across the Istra and advancing on Volokolamsk. During December 20-21 several divisions of 5th Army, aided by disorder caused by the cavalry, reached the Ruza River and the 108th retook Ruza itself in cooperation with the 336th Rifle Division plus two tank units. The division also forced a crossing with the help of the 37th Rifle and 22nd Tank Brigades, but this was pushed back and Ruza was also retaken in a counterattack. In fifteen days of fighting through deep snow the Army's right flank had made impressive gains but at considerable cost and now a new fortified line had been found on the west bank of the Ruza. Under these circumstances the counteroffensive had to be suspended.

=== Mozhaysk-Vereya Operation ===
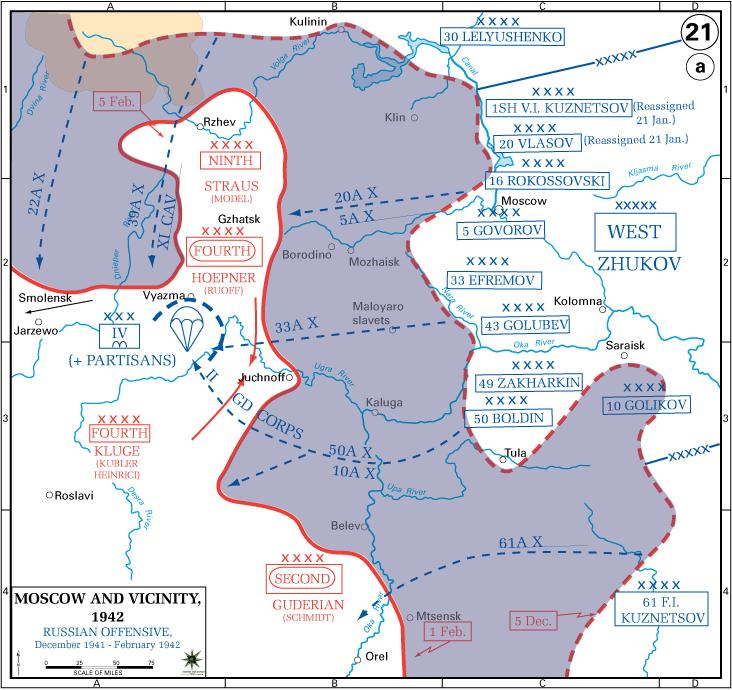
Moscow counteroffensive and formation of the Rzhev salient. Note advance of 5th Army.

The counteroffensive resumed on January 5, 1942, and on January 14 5th Army liberated Dorokhovo with its center and left wing forces. This, and the impending recapture of Ruza, opened the route to Mozhaysk, which had been turned into a major German stronghold. Zhukov now wrote a directive to the 5th and 33rd Armies:

The immediate objective of the center armies is to encircle and destroy the enemy's Mozhaysk-Gzhatsk group.
The objective: 1) the 5th Army, no later than January 16, is to capture Mozhaysk and then develop the blow toward Gzhatsk. The boundary on the left is the line Novo-Nikol'skoe–Yel'nya–Bol'shie Lomy.

Govorov, in turn, ordered his forces "to take Mozhaysk, enveloping it from the southeast and southwest." The axis of the main blow was to be on the left flank; the four divisions on the right, including the 108th, were to conduct feint attacks. The two Armies were facing the IX and VII Army Corps.

On January 11 the division, now concentrated near Kryukovo, was loaded onto trucks and moved to the Army's left flank. The 82nd Motorized was now attacking toward Dorokhovo. The next day the 108th pushed ahead to the line Yastrebovo–Novo-Arkhangelskoe, while the 50th Division encircled the German forces in Beloborodovo and Kaganovich Kholkoz and 82nd Motorized took Trufanovka and Anashkino. During January 13 the 50th captured Dubrovka, the 82nd took Kapan, and the 108th reached a front from Mishinka to Stroganka. Dorokhovo was in danger of encirclement, and was abandoned overnight. At the same time, 33rd Army reached Vereya. By the morning of the next day 5th Army's 50th Division had taken the village of Pervomaiskoe, the 82nd, 108th, and 32nd had made other gains, and German communications between Mozhaysk and Vereya had been cut. Overnight on January 16/17 Ruza had been abandoned, which freed up two rifle divisions and a tank brigade to join the attack on Mozhaysk, and the 108th, after inflicting a heavy defeat on the nearby German forces, took the edge of the wooded area south of Otyakovo and cut the Yamskaya–Vereya road. Completing the capture of Mozhaisk would be difficult until Vereya was taken, but this finally happened early on January 19. By now the garrison of the former was in a serious situation. The 19th Division was battling for Natashino and other outskirt villages, trying to reach the line of the Moskva River; the 144th was fighting to reach a line from Prudnya to Pavlishchevo; the 108th was attempting to take Yazevo; and the 50th was consolidating along with the 20th Tank Brigade. By the morning of January 20 Mozhaysk was close to being completely encircled and the garrison began to pull out. The 82nd Division broke into the city at 1330 hours and quickly cleared it. 5th Army claimed 20 artillery pieces, 76 motor vehicles, three ammunition dumps and other stores. The defeated German forces retreated west toward Uvarovo, in part over the historic Borodino battlefield and set fire to the museum there. Uvarovo was taken on January 22, and the Mozhaysk operation came to an end.

By the third week of February the counteroffensive had run out of steam, but in spite of the facts on the ground the STAVKA demanded on March 20 that the push be renewed across the front, with 5th Army expected to take Gzhatsk by April 1. This failed, and under the terms of a STAVKA order of March 21 the 108th was to be withdrawn to Ruza during April 25-30 for a brief rebuilding in the Reserve of the Supreme High Command, before returning to 5th Army. On March 4 General Birichev had been hospitalized and he would not hold another command at the front, serving in combat and physical training into the postwar. He was replaced by Col. Vasilii Grigorevich Terentev, who had previously led both the 12th and 307th Rifle Divisions.

== Battles of Rzhev ==
On July 14 Colonel Terentev was reassigned to the position of chief of staff of 16th Army, and was replaced four days later by Col. Andrei Trofimovich Stuchenko. This cavalry officer had most recently led the 4th Guards Cavalry Division. The first Rzhev-Sychyovka offensive began on July 30 but did not immediately involve 5th Army. On August 5 the STAVKA directed its new commander, Lt. Gen. I. I. Fedyuninskii, to be prepared to attack on August 7 in order to link up with 20th Army at Sychyovka two days later. In the event the 20th did not get close to that objective, and 5th Army's attacks made few gains before going over to the defense on August 25, although isolated actions continued into late September. Despite its limited participation, from August 7 and September 15 the Army suffered 28,984 casualties while gaining 35-40km.

=== Operation Mars ===
A further offensive against German 9th Army in the Rzhev salient was being planned for November, and according to several documents, including a "Map-solution of the 33rd Army Commander for an offensive south of Gzhatsk" on November 14 that Army and the 5th would enter the offensive to "destroy the enemy's Gzhatsk grouping." This would be part of "Operation Jupiter", but was postponed until December 1 and never eventuated due to the failure of Mars. On January 8, 1943, Colonel Stuchenko left the 108th to take command of the 29th Guards Rifle Division; he would eventually rise to the rank of army general before his retirement in 1972. He was replaced by Col. Grigorii Ivanovich Sinitsyn, who had been serving as deputy commander of the 29th Guards since November.

=== Rzhev-Vyazma Offensive ===
By the beginning of February the 5th Army was a relatively weak force of four rifle divisions, although still strong in artillery. The strategic situation had changed significantly following the Soviet victory at Stalingrad and the subsequent exploitation on the southern half of the front. The current commander of Western Front, General Konev, was ordered to keep up pressure on Army Group Center to prevent its forces from being shifted to other sectors. 5th Army attacked with its 29th Guards and 352nd Rifle Divisions toward Gzhatsk on February 22 against 35th Infantry Division of German 4th Army and created a small breach in its front. An exploitation force of 153rd Tank Brigade and a ski brigade was committed which reached as far as Leskovo on February 26 before being encircled and largely destroyed. However, by now it was clear to the OKH that the Rzhev salient could no longer be held and, in fact, on February 6 Hitler had authorized a withdrawal that was to begin on March 1. By that time the 108th had been reassigned to 10th Army, still in Western Front.

== Operation Kutuzov ==
During March the 108th was transferred again, now back to 16th Army. When 16th Army was redesignated as 11th Guards Army in May the 108th remained under its command. Colonel Sinitsyn left the division; he would later lead the 164th Rifle Division. His replacement was Col. Pyotr Alekseevich Teremov, who had previously served as chief of staff and deputy commander of the 26th Guards Rifle Division. He would be promoted to major general on June 3, 1944, and would lead the 108th into the postwar.

The fighting front was in a general lull during the spring as both sides recovered from the winter fighting and prepared for the German summer offensive. 11th Guards Army was still in Western Front, east of Kirov, on the north shoulder of the Oryol salient that was remained occupied by 2nd Panzer and 9th Armies. In this position it played no role in the defense against the German offensive but immediately after its defeat began preparations for the counteroffensive, which began on July 12. The Army was deployed in three echelons, with the division, along with the 1st and 5th Tank Corps, in third echelon as the reserve of the Army commander, Lt. Gen. I. K. Bagramyan. It was planned to use the 108th along the axis Belyi Verkh–Ulyanovo on the second day once a breach had been made.

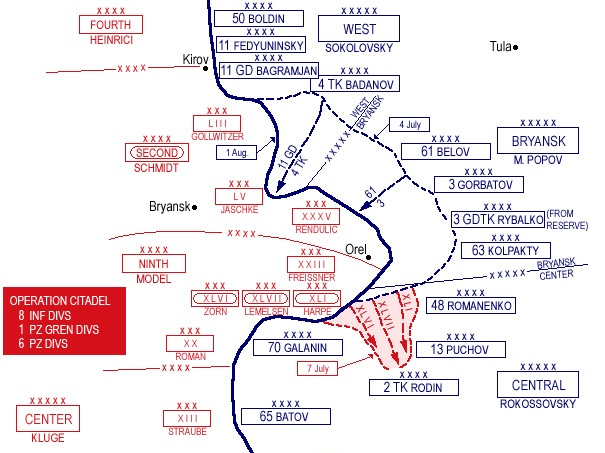
Map of Operation Kutuzov

Given its assignment the division was in the first echelon of 16th Guards Corps. The Army's main shock group was formed by the 8th and 36th Guards Rifle Corps which were to break through in the general direction of Bolkhov while the 16th Guards Rifle Corps was to broaden the breakthrough front. At 0300 hours on July 11 all the Army's first echelon divisions began a reconnaissance-in-force using reinforced rifle battalions following a 10-minute artillery onslaught. As a result of the day's fighting most of the first German trench line was captured and the main forward edge of the defense and its fire system was uncovered. The full offensive began the next day with a complex artillery preparation lasting from 0320 to 0600 when it converted to a rolling barrage. While still defending along its broad sector, the 217th Rifle Division attacked toward Ozerny with one rifle regiment at 1500 and captured two lines of trenches. By the close of the day 11th Guards Army had broken through the defense along a 14km front up to a depth of 12km.

=== Battles for Bolkhov ===
During July 13 the 16th Guards Corps continued to widen the breach in the direction of the right flank. By now the Army had routed two German infantry divisions and 5th Panzer Division and was developing the offensive toward Bolkhov while 61st Army advanced on the same objective from the northeast and east. Reacting desperately, Army Group Center rushed in reserves to halt the drive. Meanwhile 50th Army to the north had attacked unsuccessfully on July 13 and 16th Guards Corps would be forced to stretch its forces more and more to maintain contact. On July 19 the 108th was committed from behind the right flank of 8th Guards Corps, along with elements of 5th Tanks, and broke through the German defense to reach the line Shamyakino–Rudnevo–Vasilevskoe, which cut the road from Bolkhov to Khotynets. Overnight the 4th Panzer and 10th Motorized Divisions concentrated southeast of Krasnikovo, linking up with units of 9th Panzer and infantry elements. Following a one-hour preparation by artillery and aircraft this grouping launched a counterattack to encircle and destroy at least part of the 108th and 5th Tanks with a double envelopment. While the road was retaken after heavy fighting the double envelopment failed, and the two Soviet units fell back to the approaches to Stolbchee.

By now the German Bolkhov grouping had been outflanked from three sides and on July 18 it had begun a counterattack primarily against 61st Army which lasted two days, although with few results. At about this time the STAVKA transferred the 4th Tank Army to Western Front for commitment in this sector, as well as the 11th Army between the sectors of 50th and 11th Guards Armies. The 36th and 8th Guards Corps, with 25th Tank Corps, went back to the offensive on July 23 and by July 25 had reached the jumping-off point for a decisive attack on the Bolkhov grouping. The two Guards Corps were to break through the German defense along the Perkovo–Luchki sector, secure the commitment of 4th Tank Army into the breach, and subsequently outflank Khotynets from the east while part of their forces followed 4th Tanks in the general direction of Borilovo.

The final offensive on Bolkhov began on July 26 after an hour-long artillery preparation. 36th Guards Corps made little progress against powerful defenses. Under the circumstances the 4th Tanks had to be committed to try to make the actual breach. Despite this defensive success the German command issued orders in the evening to evacuate Bolkhov. On July 29 units of 11th Guards Army finally broke through and by the evening the 61st Army had cleared the town. The following day the Corps, in conjunction with 25th Tanks, continued a slow advance to a line from Brezhnevskii to Proletarskii. By the end of the month the Army had been transferred to Bryansk Front; the 108th remained under direct Army control.

=== Battles for Khotynets ===
From July 31 to August 5 the 11th Guards, along with 4th Tank Army, was involved in stubborn fighting for control of the paved road and railroad between Oryol and Bryansk. By the morning of August 6 the 11th Guards had handed over its right-flank sector to 11th Army, along with its 108th and 197th Rifle Divisions. As of August 12 this Army was closing in on the German stronghold of Karachev. At 0200 the reconnaissance battalions of the 25th and 46th Rifle Corps' divisions began their attack. The battalions broke through the forward screen and reached the forward edge of the defensive zone, and in places penetrated into the main zone of resistance. At noon the artillery opened up a powerful 30-minute bombardment, suppressing the German defense. Following this the main forces of the two Corps attacked against a stiff defense marked by heavy firepower and multiple counterattacks. By the end of August 14 the Soviet forces had completely broken through the defensive zone and reached the approaches to Karachev.

At 0300 hours on August 15 the immediate fighting for the town began. The Germans considered it significant as a road junction, supply base, and center of resistance and had concentrated units of the 78th and 34th Infantry Divisions, plus remnants of the 253rd and 293rd Infantry Divisions, 18th and 8th Panzer Divisions, and several other formations in its defense. The 238th and 369th Rifle Divisions outflanked the town from the northeast and north as the 197th, 323rd and 110th Rifle Divisions bypassed it from the same directions, creating a threat of encirclement. At the same time two divisions of the 11th Guards Army struck from the east and southeast. The German grouping was unable to withstand the concentric attack; the Red Army force broke into Karachev at 0830 hours and completely occupied it. German casualties were assessed at 4,000 killed and wounded, and the remainder fell back to west, covered by rearguards. As of August 18 the Army had reached the line Krasnoe–Zhurinichi–Velimya. Later that month the 108th was transferred again, now to 50th Army in Bryansk Front.

== Into Western Russia and Belarus ==
50th Army was under command of General Boldin. On October 10 Bryansk Front was disbanded and the Army came under command of Central Front, which was soon renamed Belorussian Front.

=== Novyi Bykhov-Propoisk Offensive ===
By the third week of November the left (south) flank of 50th Army had reached the confluence of the Sozh and Pronya Rivers east of the town of Propoisk, which is on the west bank of the Sozh. The Front commander, Army Gen. Rokossovskii, ordered his 3rd and 50th Armies to attack across the Sozh, with the 3rd beginning on November 22 and the 50th two days later in a supporting role. The 413th and 110th Rifle Divisions attacked in the Uzgorsk and Krasnaia Sloboda sector just north of Propoisk after a ten-minute artillery raid with the 108th in second echelon. These forces were able to cross the river and penetrate the German defense despite rasputitsa conditions and an almost complete absence of roads; in fact, the attack developed quite slowly until 10th Army to the north entered the offensive on November 28. By this time the 46th Rifle Corps had entered the penetration, led by the 369th Division, and the commander of 9th Army, General W. Model, convinced Hitler to allow him to withdraw to new defenses closer to the Dniepr. By November 30 the Army had advanced from 16-30km on a 37km front, with the 108th still in second echelon beside the 380th Rifle Division.

=== Bykhov-Chavusy Offensive ===
On January 4, 1944, a new offensive aimed at Bykhaw and Chavusy was launched by elements of 3rd, 50th and 10th Armies. Under the plan for this offensive, the 108th, 110th, and 413th Divisions would penetrate the defense of the 95th Infantry Division west of the Ukhliast River on a 7km-wide sector from Smolitsa to Krasnitsa, capture the strongpoint at the latter place, and then exploit northwest in line with 3rd Army. The shock group had the 110th and 413th in first echelon and the 108th in second. The initial assault drove the 95th Infantry back to a new defense line called the Winterstand along the Ukhliast by late on January 5, at which point Boldin reinforced the attack with the 108th, and the next day with the 324th Rifle Division which had been returned from 10th Army. All four divisions fought unsuccessfully for Krasnitsa while battalion-size reinforcements arrived on the German side. While important gains were made, there was no breakthrough, in part due to the rifle divisions of all three armies numbering roughly 3,500 men each, and the attack was suspended on January 8.

=== Rogachev-Zhlobin Offensive ===
Later that month the 108th, 110th, and 413th came under command of the new 121st Rifle Corps. On the morning of February 22 this Corps, along with the 324th Division,

... went over to an offensive along the Mshatoe Swamp and Adamenka line... forced the Dnepr River, penetrated the enemy's prepared defensive belt on the right [western] bank of the river, and by 29 February reached a front extending from Hill Marker 144.9 to south of Zaiachenie, and through Starosel'e, Station No. 15, and the southern bank of the Ezva River to Khomichi, while threatening the flank and rear of the enemy's entire Mogilev-Bykhov grouping.

During this operation German losses included 119 guns, 34 tanks, 71 mortars, 320 machine guns, 3,500 rifles, and other equipment, some of it captured, and the city of Rahachow was taken. 50th Army lost 1,611 killed, 4,890 wounded, and 12 missing in action. In the last days of February the 108th was reassigned to 46th Rifle Corps, and it would remain under this command for nearly the duration of the war.

In late March General Rokossovskii, whose command was now designated 1st Belorussian Front, produced a plan to eliminate the German bridgehead over the Dniepr, based on Mogilev. 50th Army formed a shock group based on 46th and 121st Rifle Corps plus the 1st Tank Corps on a 10km-wide sector east of Bykhaw, facing part of the XII Army Corps. The intermediate objective was to break through the German defense and reach the southern outskirts of Mogilev by April 1. 46th Corps contributed its 108th and 413th Divisions to the attack. In the event the attack, which began on March 25, collapsed after minimal gains. The shock group advanced 3km at the deepest point and 46th Corps captured the southern approaches to Krasnitsa but could go no farther, despite the help of 1st Tanks. The offensive was called off on March 31, despite being reinforced by the 238th Rifle Division.

== Operation Bagration ==
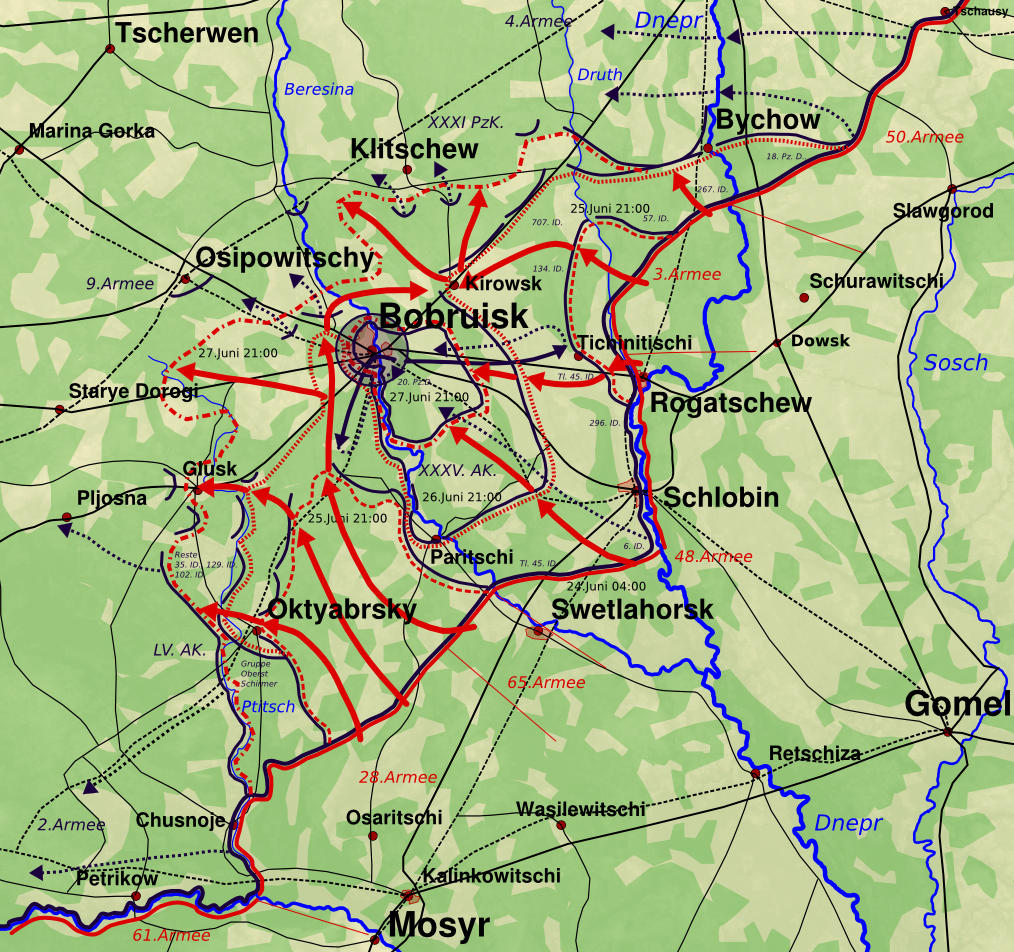
Babruysk operation. Note thrust of 3rd Army's right flank toward Bykhaw.

During April 50th Army was transferred to the newly re-created 2nd Belorussian Front, but 46th Corps was moved to 3rd Army, remaining in 1st Belorussian. Just before the start of the summer offensive the 108th was reassigned to 41st Rifle Corps, which also contained the 120th Guards and 269th Rifle Divisions. 3rd Army was under command of A. V. Gorbatov, who would be promoted to the rank of colonel general on June 29. Gorbatov's right flank extended from Yanovo to Khomichi, while he intended to launch his main attack on his left flank in cooperation with 48th Army to the south. According to the plan, by the end of the seventh day the Army was to reach a line from Chigirinka to Barki to Orlino to the east bank of the Berezina River.

=== Babruysk Offensive ===
The main offensive on this sector started on June 23. 40th Rifle Corps began with a shattering artillery barrage of 45 minutes beginning at 0200 hours against the sector held by German XII Corps near Rahachow, followed by regimental-sized attacks against the 267th Infantry and 18th Panzergrenadier Divisions. This was intended as a holding attack to divert attention from the main attack on the left. This was led by 41st and 35th Rifle Corps and made moderate progress on this first day. It was renewed on June 24 at 0400 following another heavy bombardment lasting two hours, and the first line of trenches fell by 0800, but then stalled until the weather cleared and airstrikes could begin. The next day at 1000 41st and 35th Corps struck the 134th Infantry Division, and at noon the 9th Tank Corps joined the assault. The tanks soon crossed the road from Mogilev to Babruysk and advanced 10km toward the latter, with 40th, 41st, and 80th Rifle Corps following in its wake. Six German divisions were now in danger of encirclement southeast of Babruysk.

During June 27 the 48th, 3rd and 65th Armies advanced without much opposition to both encircle Babruysk and eliminate the three isolated German divisions that had been in the Zhlobin–Rahachow area. The 3rd and 48th forced a crossing of the Ola River off the march, which compromised the defensive zone based on it. Elements of 3rd Army also forced the Olsa River on a 10km-wide sector and got into the rear of the German Bykhaw grouping, which cut its retreat routes to the southwest and west; this advance also threatened the rail connection of the Mogilev grouping. Given the position at day's end, Rokossovskii tasked 48th Army with eliminating the pocket southeast of Babruysk while 3rd and 65th, assisted by the Dniepr River Flotilla, captured the city itself. In the morning, mobile units of 65th Army cut all the roads from Babruysk to the west and northwest, while its 105th Rifle Corps cut the paved road to Hlusk and 1st Guards Tanks broke into the northern and northwestern outskirts. Meanwhile, Gorbatov, striving to capture Asipovichy, released 40th Corps from Army reserve. Babruysk was soon taken and the division was awarded a battle honor:

BOBRUYSK... 108th Rifle Division (Major General Teremov, Pyotr Alekseevich)... The troops who participated in the liberation of Bobruysk, by the order of the Supreme High Command of 29 June 1944, and a commendation in Moscow, are given a salute of 20 artillery salvoes from 224 guns.

At about the same time the division returned to 46th Corps. As 41st Corps remained behind to continue clearing the Babruysk area the remainder of 3rd Army, along with most of 65th Army, pursued the offensive to the west and northwest.

=== Lublin–Brest Offensive ===
During the afternoon of July 1 the 35th Corps, leading 3rd Army, took the town of Cherven, cutting the Minsk–Mogilev road, and the following day linked up with units of 50th Army after overcoming resistance along the Minsk road. The 80th and 41st Corps were coming up behind as part of the Army's main attack toward that city, some 50–55km to the northeast and north. At 2300 hours, Rokossovskii ordered his 1st Guards Tanks, and then the 3rd and 48th Armies, to push through the night and capture Minsk as quickly as possible. Led by the armor, Gorbatov's right flank reached the city's southeastern outskirts by 1600, at which point further orders from Rokossovskii directed the Army to bypass it and continue to pursue in the direction of Dzyarzhynsk. During the day the Army's right flank covered 45–48km in total. On July 4 the STAVKA transferred 3rd Army to 2nd Belorussian Front. However, 46th Corps was itself transferred to 65th Army later in the month, where it and the 108th would remain for the duration of the war.

At the start of the Brest-Siedlce operation on July 17 the 46th Corps remained in second echelon, along with 1st Guards Tank Corps and the 1st Polish Army. Rokossovskii, eager to break the growing German resistance and complete the encirclement of Brest, turned over the 46th temporarily to 28th Army. On July 27 the Corps attacked along this Army's right flank toward Wysokoe, breaking the German resistance in cooperation with 65th Army's 18th Rifle Corps. Brest fell the next day, 46th Corps went back to 65th Army, and began advancing toward the Narew River, reaching there in early September.

In the first week of October 65th Army took part in several crossing operations over the Narew. Sen. Lt. Aleksei Fyodorovich Titov reached the west bank on October 4 with his machine gun platoon of the 444th Rifle Regiment. Over the following four days he led his men in beating off over 30 counterattacks and securing their foothold. On March 24, 1945, Titov was posthumously made a Hero of the Soviet Union, as he had been killed in the fighting in East Prussia two months earlier.

== Into Poland and Germany ==
On November 17, Marshal Rokossovskii was moved to command of the 2nd Belorussian Front. In order to soften the blow of this "demotion" he was allowed to transfer 65th Army, under command of his protege, Col. Gen. P. I. Batov, to his new Front. Ten days later, Col. Semyon Savvich Velichko, who had been serving as deputy commander of 108th, took over the 186th Rifle Division, also in 46th Corps.

On December 17, Rokossovskii issued his operational directive for the forthcoming Vistula-Oder offensive, which included:

7. The 65th Army... will launch its main attack on the left flank along the front Obrębek–Budy Ciepielińskie (a breakthrough front of seven kilometres) along the axis Jackowo–Nowe Miasto–Sochocin–Drobin.
The immediate objective is to break through the enemy's defense and by the close of the operation's first day reach the line Beliany–Kendzezawice–Nasielsk.

In order to develop the success of the breakthrough the Army was to be reinforced with the 3rd Guards Tank Corps.

On January 14, 1945, 65th Army broke through the German defense along a 12–13km front and advanced in fighting from 3 to 5km. A further advance of 3 to 4km was made the next day following a 12-minute onslaught by all its artillery. The attack continued overnight, and during January 16 the Army gained up to 20km, captured the German strongpoint at Nasielsk and cut the railroad from Ciechanów to Modlin. On January 18 the Mława fortified area was secured by combined forces of 5th Guards Tank, 48th and 65th Armies. The next day Płońsk was also taken; the 575th Artillery Regiment and the 172nd Sapper Battalion both received its name as an honorific. On February 19 the division as a whole would be recognized for its part in the breakthrough of the German defenses north of Warsaw with the rare award of the Order of Lenin. On the same date all three of its rifle regiments received the Order of the Red Banner for their parts in the battles for Mława, Działdowo and Płońsk

=== East Pomeranian Offensive ===
By the end of January 26 the 65th Army had reached the approaches to Marienwerder and Graudenz and the east bank of the Vistula River southwest of Graudenz. The East Pomeranian offensive began on February 10. As of February 24 the 65th Army was fighting along a line roughly from Skurz to Wda to Osowo to Schwartzwasser. By March 5 elements of 2nd Belorussian Front had reached the Baltic Sea north and northwest of Köslin, cutting off the German forces in the Danzig area from Germany; however 65th Army had only managed to advance 8–10km during this period. From March 14–30 the 8th Mechanized Corps worked with 46th Corps in the final reduction of the German Danzig-Gdynia grouping. As a result of the fighting for Danzig the 407th Rifle Regiment (Lt. Colonel Stepan Denisovich Ishchenko) received its name as an honorific, and several other of the 108th's subunits received decorations:

- 444th Rifle Regiment - Order of Suvorov, 3rd Degree
- 575th Artillery Regiment - Order of Suvorov, 3rd Degree
- 152nd Antitank Battalion - Order of Suvorov, 3rd Degree
- 172nd Sapper Battalion - Order of the Red Star
- 485th Signal Battalion - Order of Alexander Nevsky

All of the decorations would be awarded on May 17.

=== Berlin Strategic Offensive ===
For the offensive into central Germany the 65th was one of four combined-arms armies deployed by 2nd Belorussian Front along the northern reaches of the Oder River. The Army deployed along the 17km front from Altdamm to Ferdinandstein, and was to launch its main attack with its left wing, forcing the West Oder and breaking through along a 4km sector from Kurow to Kolbitzow. The 108th was one of the Army's seven divisions grouped along the axis of the main attack. 46th Corps had a two-echelon formation, with the division in first echelon. The strength of the Army's rifle divisions varied from 3,600 to 4,800 men at this time.

General Batov had designated special reconnaissance groups from his forces, including a reinforced regiment from both the 108th and 186th Divisions of 46th Corps. The main area of interest was along the highway from Retzowsfelde to Kolbitzow. The forcing of the East Oder River began at dawn on April 18, using boats, pontoons and improvised means of crossing, with cover from artillery fire and smokescreens. After landing on the west bank, the German screening forces were quickly swept aside and by the end of the day the east bank of the West Oder had been reached at several places despite severe restrictions on movement due to the flooded terrain. Operations continued the next day to round up small German groupings and build up strength for the further crossings. As well, the East Oder was bridged at several points.

65th Army began forcing the West Oder at 0715 hours on April 20 simultaneously with the start of a 45-minute artillery preparation. 46th Corps' forward detachments managed to seize a bridgehead in the Niederzaden area, breaking through the German defense along the riverbank by 0800. Sen. Sgt. Leonid Dmitrievich Zubov of the 172nd Sapper Battalion is believed to have been the first man of the 108th across. He ferried a landing party by boat, removed 27 antitank mines and cleared a path for the following infantry. Over the next 24 hours he made a further 23 crossings with infantry, ammunition, and wounded, despite being wounded himself. He was evacuated on April 21 after receiving a chest wound from a shell fragment. On June 29 he was made a Hero of the Soviet Union. After being demobilized in May 1946 he worked in the printing industry until his retirement in 1972 and died in Moscow on September 24, 1992.

During the first day heavy resistance and counterattacks by infantry and tanks of the 27th SS Langemarck and 28th SS Wallonien were beaten off. By day's end the 108th and 186th had reached positions from 500m north of the Niederzaden brick works to Niederzaden to the west slopes of height 65.4. During April 21 the Corps' forward units managed to advance another 500–1,000m while fending off further counterattacks and crossing the 413th Division and rear elements of the 108th under cover of a smokescreen.

46th Corps continued to expand its bridgehead at 1000 hours on April 22, following a massive artillery strike, and by the end of the day had reached a line from Hohen Zaden to the eastern outskirts of Kolbitzow. As German resistance weakened, by the end of April 24 the Corps had reached a line from the outskirts of Pritzlow to Schmellentin to height 76.2. The next day it got as far as Barnimslow with its front facing northwards towards the Baltic coast. During April 25 the Army was approaching the German second defense line, which was based on the Randow River. With the support of the 1st Guards Tanks it advanced up to 10km on its left flank. 3rd Panzer Army threw in what little it had in reserves, including the 1st Marine Division, the 389th Infantry and 549th Volksgrenadier Divisions, and an SS brigade. These launched 13 counterattacks in company to battalion strength, supported by armor, but all failed to halt the advance. 46th Corps reached a line from Karow to Hohenhof Creek, again facing north.

On April 26 the 105th Corps took Stettin by storm while the 46th and 18th Corps attacked to the northwest, forced the Randow and broke through the second German defensive zone. During this fighting the latter two corps repulsed four German counterattacks carried out by the 50th SS Police Brigade, remnants of the 610th Reserve Division and 1st Marine Division. By the end of the day, after an advance of 10–12km, they reached a line from Saltsow to Wollschow to Battin. German resistance along the lower Oder was now effectively crushed. The 444th Rifle Regiment (Lt. Colonel Anatoli Abilovich Abilov) and 485th Signal Battalion (Maj. Konstantin Vladimirovich Shadrin) each received the name of the city as a battle honor. On the following day the Army, still with 1st Guards Tanks, covered 20–22km, and the remainder of the campaign was a rapid advance of up to 34km per day against small covering detachments.

== Postwar ==
On June 4 the division received the Order of the Red Banner for its successes in the battles for Anklam, Neubrandenburg, and other places. Its men and women now shared the full title of 108th Rifle, Bobruysk, Order of Lenin, Order of the Red Banner Division. (Russian: 108-я стрелковая Бобруйская ордена Ленина Краснознамённая дивизия.) On the same day, in recognition of their roles in the fighting for Stettin, Penkun, and other places the 407th Regiment was awarded the Order of Suvorov, 3rd Degree, the 575th Artillery Regiment got the Order of Kutuzov, 3rd Degree, and the 172nd Sapper Battalion received the Order of Alexander Nevsky.

General Teremov remained in command until January 1946 when he was moved to command of the 44th Guards Rifle Division. He would later lead its successor, the 144th Guards Airborne Division and retired in August 1948. Col. Nikolai Stepanovich Pachkov would command the 108th until its disbandment.

Under the terms of STAVKA Order No. 11097 of May 29, 1945, 2nd Belorussian Front was converted into the Northern Group of Forces, based in Poland, and 65th Army was retained in its structure. In June 1946 it was reformed as the 7th Mechanized Army and the 108th was disbanded the same month.
