= 352nd Division =

352nd Division may refer to:

- 352nd Infantry Division, Wehrmacht, Germany
- 352nd Rifle Division, Soviet Union

== See also ==
- List of military divisions by number
