= Nikolai Ivanovich Orlov =

Soviet general (1895–1965)

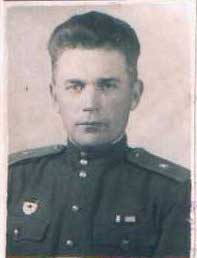
- Orlov, c. 1944
- Born: 1 December 1895; Bobryk, Zabelyshynskaya volost, Klimovichskiy Uyezd, Mogilev Governorate, Russian Empire
- Died: 3 March 1965 (aged 69); Lvov, Soviet Union
- Military career
- Allegiance: Russian Empire; Russian SFSR; Soviet Union
- Branch: Imperial Russian Army; Red Army
- Service years: 1915-1917, 1918–1955
- Rank: Major general
- Commands: 19th Rifle Division; 224th Rifle Division; 108th Rifle Division; 82nd (redesignated 3rd Guards) Motor Rifle Division; 5th Guards Rifle Corps; 146th Rifle Division
- Conflicts: World War I; Russian Civil War; Polish–Soviet War; World War II
- Awards: Order of Lenin; Order of the Red Banner (4)

Nikolai Ivanovich Orlov (Russian: Николай Иванович Орлов; 1 December 1895 – 3 March 1965) was a Soviet major general who held division and corps command during World War II.

== Early life, World War I, and Russian Civil War ==
An ethnic Russian, Nikolai Ivanovich Orlov was born in a peasant family on 1 December 1895 in the khutor of Bobryk, Zabelyshynskaya volost, Klimovichskiy Uyezd, Mogilev Governorate. He completed four years at a parochial school. Orlov was conscripted into the Imperial Russian Army in May 1915 during World War I and assigned to the reserve battalion of the Izmailovsky Life Guards Regiment in Petrograd. After graduating from the regimental training detachment at the end of the year, Orlov continued to serve in the training detachment as a yefreytor and junior unter-ofitser. Orlov was transferred to elements of the regiment on the Southwestern Front in late May 1916, fighting as an assistant platoon commander. Orlov was demobilized in December 1917 with the rank of senior unter-ofitser following the October Revolution.

Orlov returned to his homeland and joined the Red Army in Zabelyshyn on 21 October 1918 during the Russian Civil War. He was appointed a vsevobuch instructor of Klimovichskiy Uyezd. Orlov served as a platoon commander in the 15th Separate Battalion of the VChK troops (later renamed a battalion of the VOKhR) in Mogilev from June 1919. Orlov took command of a company of the battalion responsible for guarding the railway between Vitebsk and Zhlobin in January 1920. He became acting adjutant of the headquarters of a field expeditionary detachment tasked with fighting "banditry" in Ukraine in Krolevets in July of that year, returning to company command in August. Orlov fought in the Polish–Soviet War on the Western Front near Slonim, Baranovichi, Minsk, Dunilovichi, and Polotsk.

== Interwar period ==
Orlov transferred to the 145th Regiment of the Internal Service Troops (VNUS) stationed at Bykhov in December 1920, and served as a company commander, assistant company commander, and acting battalion commander with the unit. Transferred to the 69th Rifle Regiment of the 8th Rifle Division's 23rd Rifle Brigade in July 1921, Orlov served as an assistant company commander, chief of the foot reconnaissance detachment, chief of the destroyer detachment, and company commander. He commanded a company at the training camps of grenadiers at the headquarters of the division's 24th Rifle Brigade in Bobruysk from February 1922. From July of that year he returned to the 23rd Rifle Regiment (the former 23rd Rifle Brigade), serving as a platoon commander, chief of foot reconnaissance, company commander, and acting battalion commander. Orlov became a member of the Communist Party in 1923. He left the regiment in September 1925 to complete refresher courses at the Western Infantry School in Smolensk. Upon graduation in August 1926, Orlov returned to the regiment to serve as chief of staff of the regimental school and chief of the regimental one-year conscripts' detachment.

Orlov was transferred to serve as acting assistant commander for personnel and commander of the 110th Rifle Regiment of the 37th Rifle Division in Novozybkov in April 1929. Orlov took command of the 129th Rifle Regiment of the 43rd Rifle Division in Velikiye Luki in November 1931, and in January 1934 was appointed assistant chief of the combat training department of the Belorussian Military District headquarters. Orlov returned to the 8th Rifle Division as acting chief of staff in February 1935 before being transferred to the Kiev Military District in June of that year to serve as assistant chief of staff of the 58th Rifle Division in Cherkassy. Orlov received the rank of major on 24 December 1935 when the Red Army introduced traditional ranks. He served as chief of staff of the 100th Rifle Division at Berdychev from November 1936, and became chief of the district control group in October 1937. Orlov, promoted to colonel on 17 February 1938, was appointed commander of the 19th Rifle Division at Voronezh in May of that year. He received another promotion to the rank of kombrig on 16 August 1938. Orlov served as deputy chief of the control group of the People's Commissariat of Defense from August 1939, and was promoted to the rank of major general on 4 June 1940. He became chief of the 2nd department of the Military Training Institutions Directorate of the Red Army in September 1940. Orlov took command of the 224th Rifle Division of the Moscow Military District in March 1941, but was soon transferred to the post of deputy commander of the 44th Rifle Corps of the Western Special Military District on June 10.

== World War II ==
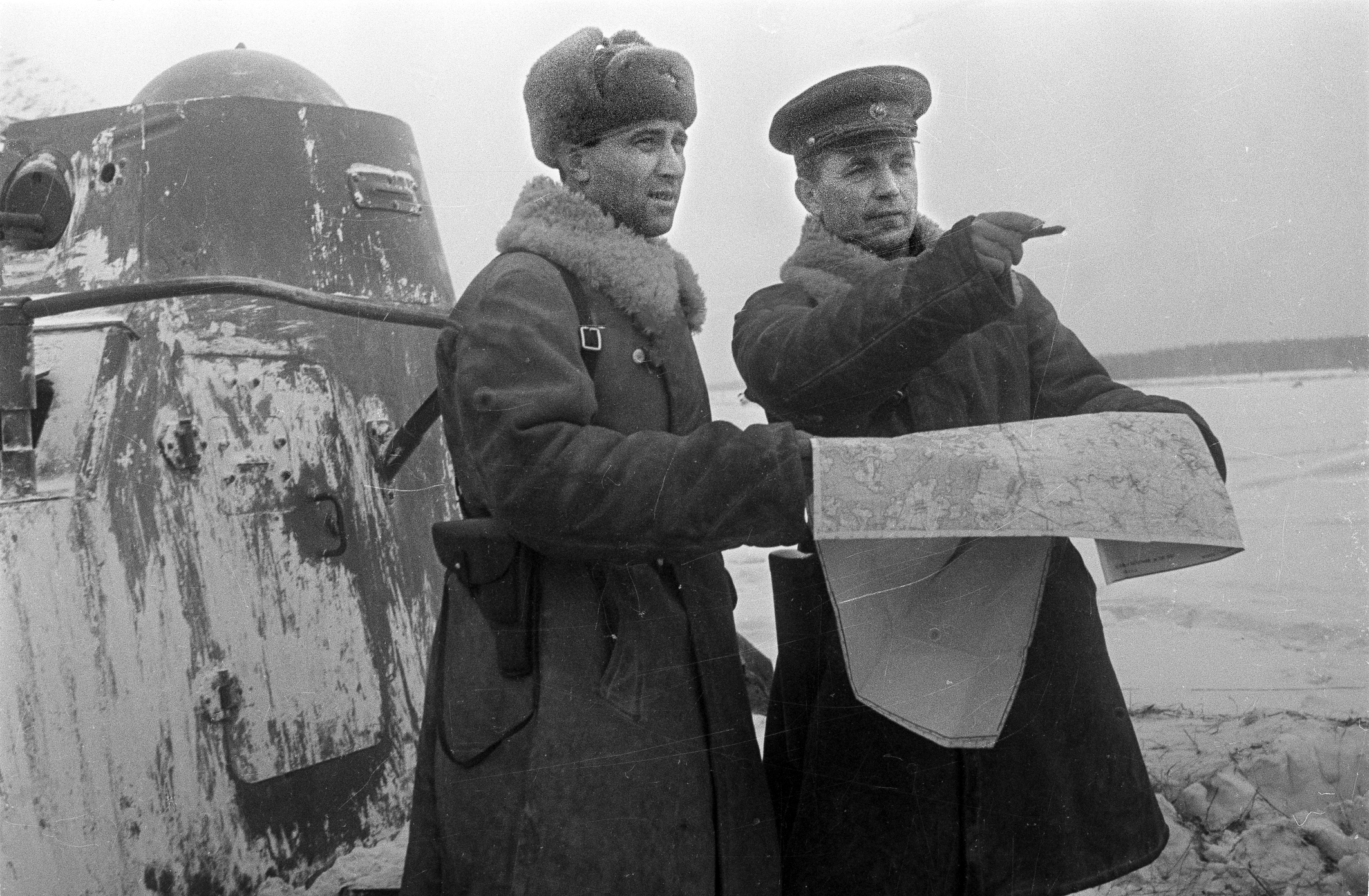
Orlov (right) while commanding the 82nd Motor Rifle Division and regimental commander Mikhail Andreyevich Klimenko with a BA-20 armored car on the Mozhaisk direction, January 1942

After Germany invaded the Soviet Union in Operation Barbarossa, the corps took part in the Battle of Białystok–Minsk. Late on 27 June, after the 44th Rifle Corps' 64th Rifle Division lost contact with its regiments, corps commander Vasily Yushkevich dispatched Orlov and corps political department chief Regimental Commissar Aleksey Stepanovich Usenko to assist the 64th Rifle Division's staff and restore order. Orlov returned to the corps headquarters on the morning of June 28 from the 64th Rifle Division, reporting that the division maintained communications with only one of its rifle regiments and its artillery regiment. Orlov reported that he had tasked with the division with organizing anti-tank groups; that elements of the 64th had destroyed 350 to 400 German tanks and armored vehicles in the previous three days; and taken the "harshest" measures to return individual fleeing soldiers mainly from the Minsk Fortified Region back to the front, handing three soldiers over to military tribunal. After receiving a report on the morning of 28 June of the retreat of the 444th Rifle Regiment of the corps' 108th Rifle Division from positions near Dzerzhynsk, Yushkevich tasked Orlov with restoring order in the regiment with an "iron hand," including demanding the regiment hold its positions without retreating "a step back," and authorizing the use of force against deserters refusing to return to the front. Later that day, a German tank attack against the 444th Regiment crushed the guns of a battalion of the divisional light artillery regiment, defeated a battalion of the corps artillery regiment, and broke through the defenses of the 108th Division. 13th Army commander Pyotr Filatov tasked Orlov on 2 July with staying behind to lead the defense of the Berezina river crossings near Berazino while the 44th Rifle Corps headquarters moved to take charge of the defense of the Borisov direction.

In July the 44th Rifle Corps fought in defensive operations as part of the 13th Army, relying on the Stalin Line fortifications of the Minsk Fortified Region. Advancing German troops forced the corps to retreat beyond the Berezina near Borisov, and then beyond the Dnieper. Orlov was evaluated as having "collected and commanded retreating uncoordinated elements of different units, with which he conducted holding actions on lines up to Mogilev." For Orlov's performance as deputy commander of the 44th Rifle Corps, Yushkevich recommended him for the Order of the Red Banner, which he was awarded on 31 August. The recommendation read:

During the period from 24 June to 13 July 1941, Comrade Orlov displayed high loyalty to the cause of the party of Lenin and Stalin and the Socialist Motherland in battles with German Fascism. For example, while directly with units fighting for Minsk near Bobruysk on the Berezina river, Comrade Orlov achieved success in battle with his personal example of courage and bravery. In addition, on 27 June, the command assigned him the task of making contact with the 64th Rifle Division, encircled near Zaslavl. Comrade Orlov fulfilled this task with honor.

Comrade Orlov also accomplished significant work to halt units and individual soldiers retreating from the front near Minsk, Bobruysk, and Berezino, returning them to forward positions and restoring order in the units.

For exemplary fulfillment of the missions assigned by command on the front of the struggle with German fascism and courage displayed in this, Comrade Orlov is deserving of the award of the Order of the Red Banner.

Orlov took command of the 108th Rifle Division of the 16th Army on 13 July and led this unit in the Battle of Smolensk. 16th Army commander Konstantin Rokossovsky assessed Orlov's performance during the Battle of Smolensk as follows:

During the period of fighting on the line of the Vop River from 29 July to 26 August 1941 and in the first moments of the offensive from 30 July to 2 August he displayed some indecisiveness and confusion. He subsequently straightened out. He is able to pull himself together, which speaks to his possession of rather strong will. He is personally courageous, and by character overly calm. He can lead troops and is able to lead them into battle...

After the Vyzama defensive operation, Orlov was appointed commander of the 82nd Motor Rifle Division on 2 November, leading the division in defensive operations east of Dorokhovo as part of the 5th Army. The division distinguished itself in the liberation of Mozhaysk during the December 1941 Soviet counteroffensive in the Battle of Moscow, for which it was converted into the 3rd Guards Motorized Rifle Division. Orlov was appointed commander of the newly formed 5th Guards Rifle Corps on 12 February 1942, leading the corps in offensive and defensive actions on the Zhizdra direction as part of the 16th Army. He was relieved of command in June for "unsuccessful organization of the offensive" and appointed commander of the 146th Rifle Division. Orlov led the division in defensive operations south of Yukhnov as part of the 50th Army of the Western Front. 50th Army commander Ivan Boldin noted in February 1943 that "the division did not fulfill a single combat objective and suffered heavy, unjustified losses..."

Orlov was evacuated to a hospital due to illness on 2 March 1943 and sent to the Red Army sanatorium at Arkhangelskoye Palace for further rest on 8 May. He was sent to the Voroshilov Higher Military Academy in July 1943 for advanced officer training. Upon graduation in May 1944, he became deputy commander of the Kiev Military District for Military Training Institutions, a position he held for the remainder of the war.

== Postwar ==
Postwar, Orlov continued to serve with the Kiev Military District in his prior role before being transferred to serve as deputy commander of the Stavropol Military District for Military Training Institutions in January 1946. He transferred to the same role in the Taurida Military District in June 1946, and in September of that year was appointed chief of the Lvov Infantry School. This was to be Orlov's last posting before his retirement on 19 August 1955. Orlov lived in Lvov, where he died on 3 March 1965. He was buried at the Baikove Cemetery in Kiev.

== Awards ==
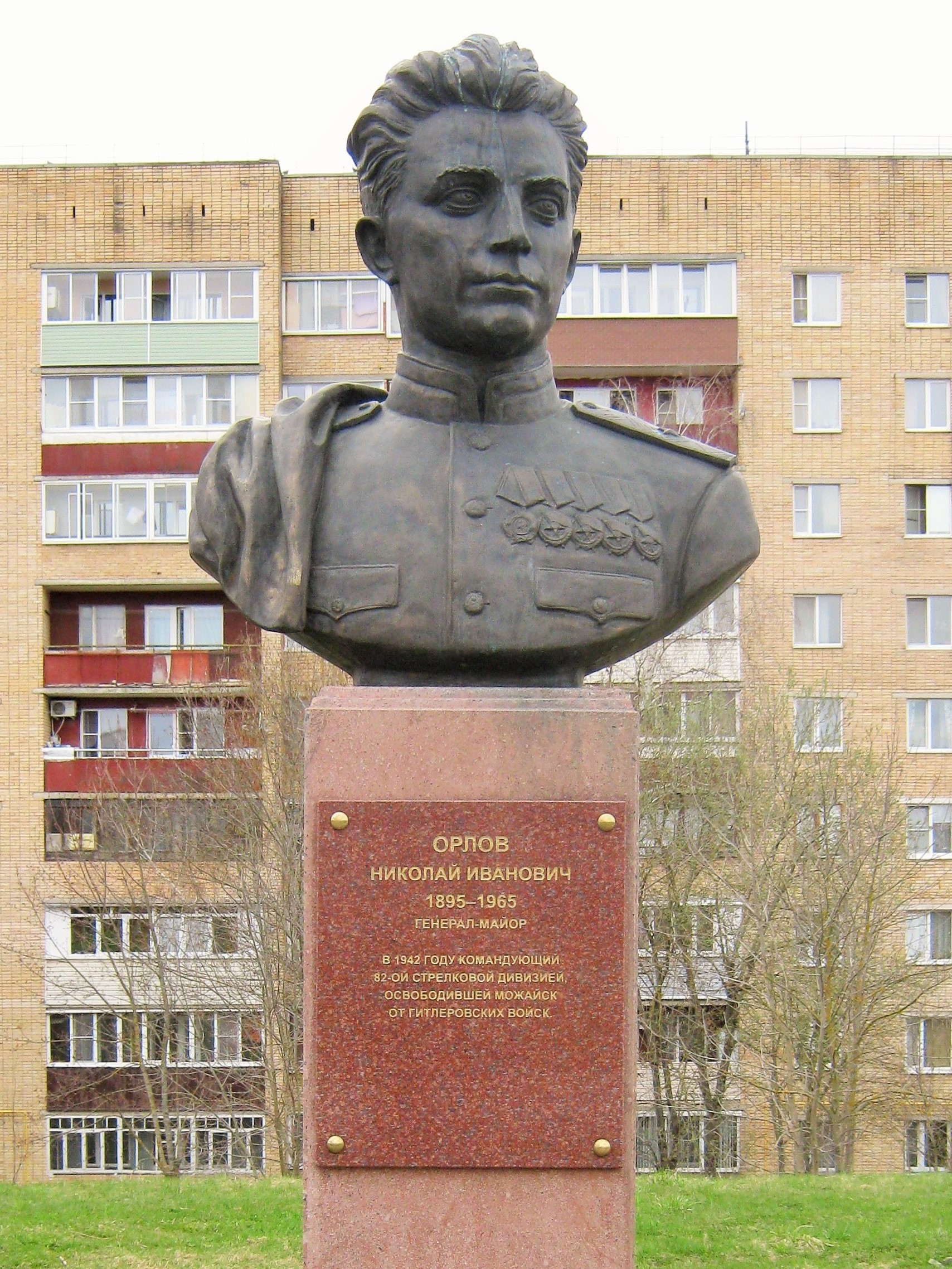
Bust of Orlov at the Alley of Heroes in Mozhaysk

Orlov was a recipient of the following decorations:

- Order of Lenin (21 February 1945; for long service)
- Order of the Red Banner (31 August 1941, 25 February 1944, 3 November 1944, 20 June 1949)
- Jubilee Medal "XX Years of the Workers' and Peasants' Red Army" (22 February 1938)
- Medal "For the Defense of Moscow"
- Medal "For the Victory over Germany in the Great Patriotic War 1941–1945"
