= 146th Rifle Division =

146th Rifle Division (August 16, 1939 – December 27, 1941) 146th Rifle Division (January 27, 1942 – June 1946)
- Active: 1939–1946
- Country: Soviet Union
- Branch: Red Army
- Type: Infantry
- Size: Division
- Engagements: Soviet invasion of Poland; Soviet occupation of Bessarabia and Northern Bukovina; Operation Barbarossa; Battle of Kiev (1941); Battles of Rzhev; Battle of Smolensk (1943); Battle of Nevel (1943); Pustoshka-Idritsa offensive Pskov-Ostrov offensive Tartu offensive Šiauliai offensive Riga offensive Vistula-Oder offensive East Pomeranian offensive Battle of Berlin
- Decorations: Order of the Red Banner; Order of Suvorov (both 2nd Formation)
- Battle honours: Ostrov (2nd Formation)

Commanders
- Notable commanders: Maj. Gen. Ivan Mikhailovich Gerasimov; Col. Aleksandr Nikolaevich Alekseev; Lt. Gen. Yury Vladimirovich Novoselskii; Maj. Gen. Nikolai Ivanovich Orlov; Col. Dmitri Arsentovich Dulov; Col. Nerses Parsievich Baloyan; Maj. Gen. Ivan Mikhailovich Nekrasov; Maj. Gen. Sergei Isaevich Karapetyan

The 146th Rifle Division was formed for the first time as a Red Army rifle division in August 1939, based on the shtat (table of organization and equipment) of the following month, in the Ukrainian Military District as part of a major build-up of the Army prior to the start of World War II. Very soon after being formed it was part of the Soviet force that invaded eastern Poland, and the next year also took part in the occupation of Romanian territories in Bessarabia and northern Bukovina. After the start of the German invasion in 1941 it was assigned to 6th Army in Southwestern Front, then reassigned to 26th Army before defending the approaches to Kyiv as part of 37th Army for several weeks until being surrounded and destroyed in September east of the city.

A second formation began in January 1942, based on a pair of partly formed 400-series divisions, in the Moscow Military District, and entered the fighting as part of 50th Army of Western Front in the last stages of the winter counteroffensive in front of Moscow. It suffered heavily in this fighting and then remained on relatively quiet sectors as part of 49th Army until the withdrawal of German 9th Army from the Rzhev salient. It was service in the same Army in the 1943 summer offensive that liberated Smolensk, and was the first Soviet unit into Spas-Demensk in late August. It was then shifted north after being refitted in the Reserve of the Supreme High Command and came under command of 2nd Baltic Front's 3rd Shock Army, fighting under those commands in the later stages of the battle for Nevel. By the start of the summer offensive in 1944 it had fought its way to the northern part of the Panther Line, east of Ostrov, and during that offensive, under command of 1st Shock Army of 3rd Baltic Front, took part in the liberation of that town, for which it was awarded a battle honor. Shortly after, during the advance through Estonia, it was also awarded the Order of the Red Banner. When 3rd Baltic was disbanded in October the 146th returned to 3rd Shock, which was transferred to 1st Belorussian Front just prior to the winter offensive into Poland and Pomerania. 3rd Shock was tasked with a leading role in the final battle for Berlin, and the division ended the war fighting in the streets of the German capital, winning further distinctions. It saw postwar duty in the Group of Soviet Forces in Germany, before moving to Ukraine in early 1946 and being disbanded in June.

== 1st Formation ==
The first 146th Rifle Division began forming on August 16, 1939, at Berdychiv in the Ukrainian Military District, under command of Kombrig Ivan Mikhailovich Gerasimov. This officer had previously led the 10th Rifle Division. The division was barely formed when it joined the active army on September 17 as part of Ukrainian Front's 13th Rifle Corps as part of the force that invaded eastern Poland. The following June it was under Southern Front's 36th Rifle Corps when Bessarabia and northern Bukovina were occupied. Just prior to this, Gerasimov's rank was modernized to that of major general.

At the time of the German invasion its order of battle was as follows:

- 512th Rifle Regiment
- 608th Rifle Regiment
- 698th Rifle Regiment
- 280th Artillery Regiment
- 717th Howitzer Regiment
- 211th Antitank Battalion
- 476th Antiaircraft Battalion
- 126th Reconnaissance Battalion
- 119th Sapper Battalion
- 226th Signal Battalion
- 171st Medical/Sanitation Battalion
- 93rd Chemical Defense (Anti-gas) Platoon
- 133rd Motor Transport Battalion
- 101st Field Bakery
- 226th Field Postal Station
- 352nd Field Office of the State Bank

The division was still in 36th Corps, which also contained the 140th and 228th Rifle Divisions. The Corps was in reserve, away from the border, spread from Zhytomyr to south of Shepetivka, with the 146th roughly in the middle near the Sluch River. By the evening of June 23 it had moved up to Tereshki, and by June 27 it was operating alongside the 14th Cavalry Division, defending the Kremenets area against German tanks and motorized infantry. By the end of June 36th Corps had lost the 228th and had been assigned to 6th Army in Southwestern Front.

On June 29 the Front commander, Col. Gen. M. P. Kirponos, criticized the performance of 36th Corps, stating in part:

When fired upon in combat, subunits lacking materiel support do not advance, and block up the rear areas and roads... [There are] instances of panic (140th and 146th Rifle Divisions) when, even without seeing the enemy or seeing an insignificant number of the enemy, subunits run to the rear, casting away everything in their path, and subunit and unit commanders fail to undertake required measures to restore order.

By the middle of July the Corps was facing the German XXXXIV Army Corps northeast of Khmilnyk, but in late July the division was reassigned to 26th Army, no longer under a corps command but still in Southwestern Front; it thus avoided the encirclement of 6th Army near Uman. General Gerasimov had commanded the Kiev Fortified Region from January 1938 - August 1939, so it was logical to reassign his division to 37th Army, fighting in the defense lines on the direct northern approaches to Kyiv. This position gave the men and women of the 146th virtually no hope of escape from the German encirclement, and the division was destroyed in September.

Gerasimov was captured on September 19 while attempting to escape the pocket and was replaced by Col. Aleksandr Nikolaevich Alekseev. He would remain in captivity until he was freed by American forces on May 4, 1945. He was immediately made part of the Soviet Military Mission in Paris, but before the end of the month came under an investigation that lasted into December when he was arrested and imprisoned, eventually being released on August 1, 1953, in the wake of Stalin's death. He had been dismissed from the Red Army in late 1946, but in 1956 he was officially rehabilitated and shortly after reinstated in the Army with his former rank. He retired on March 5, 1957, and lived until April 19, 1968. His destroyed division officially remained on the Soviet order of battle until December 27, 1941, when it was removed.

== 2nd Formation ==
The second 146th Rifle Division officially began forming on January 19, 1942, in the Moscow Military District, based on the 1st formation of the 416th Rifle Division. The new division also incorporated the provisional 468th Rifle Division, which had begun forming in December, at Kagami in the Central Asian Military District, presumably with a large number of Kazakh or Uzbek recruits. The amalgamation of these two bodies took place at Venyov in January. The order of battle was similar to that of the previous formation:

- 512th Rifle Regiment
- 608th Rifle Regiment
- 698th Rifle Regiment
- 280th Artillery Regiment
- 211th Antitank Battalion
- 126th Reconnaissance Company
- 149th Sapper Battalion
- 249th Signal Battalion (later 226th Battalion, 215th Company, 249th Company)
- 171st Medical/Sanitation Battalion
- 501st Chemical Defense (Anti-gas) Company
- 133rd Motor Transport Company
- 517th Field Bakery
- 882nd Divisional Veterinary Hospital
- 1718th Field Postal Station
- 1073rd Field Office of the State Bank

Lt. Col. Yury Vladimirovich Novoselskii, who had been leading the 416th since it had begun forming, remained in command after the redesignation. This veteran officer had been in command of the 2nd Mechanized Corps at the outbreak of the war, and after this was disbanded in August became the Red Army's Inspector of Tank Forces. The new division remained in Moscow District in February, then moved to the Reserve of the Supreme High Command, joining the active army on March 24 in the Western Front reserves before being assigned to 50th Army in that front on April 11.

=== Attempt to relieve 1st Guards Cavalry ===
On January 9-10 elements of 50th Army and the 1st Guards Cavalry Corps had outflanked the German positions at Yukhnov, eventually surrounding them on three sides while the cavalry reached out to cut the Moscow–Minsk highway in the German rear, then, finding a gap in the German lines, raided toward Vyazma on January 28. In early February the forces of Army Group Center began counterattacking along all axes of Red Army operations and managed to hold Vyazma as Soviet forces were short of food, ammunition, and all other supplies. The Soviet positions north and south of Yukhnov were also retaken. The Front commander, Army Gen. G. K. Zhukov, ordered his 43rd, 49th and 50th Armies to restore the situation there, and on March 5 that place was taken. However, many Soviet forces, including 1st Guards Cavalry, were still trapped in the German rear.

The 146th entered this situation when it replaced the 173rd Rifle Division near Mosalsk on April 11. Three days later it attacked, with other units of 50th Army, in an effort to cross the Moscow–Minsk highway at the villages of Fomino-2 and Zaitseva Gora in order to link up with 1st Guards Cavalry. At one point only 2,000m remained to be crossed, but on April 15 German reserves threw the attack back, at a cost to the division of perhaps 75 percent of its "bayonets" (riflemen and sappers). It was pulled from the line and replaced by the 58th Rifle Division. On June 20 General Novoselskii was placed at the disposal of Marshal K. E. Voroshilov, and in November was made commander of Tank Forces for Bryansk Front. He would hold several corps commands in 1943-45 and retired in 1950. The new commander of the 146th was Maj. Gen. Nikolai Ivanovich Orlov, who had been in command of the 5th Guards Rifle Corps. He was in turn replaced on January 17, 1943, by Col. Dmitri Arsentovich Dulov, who had been serving as the division's chief of staff.

The division continued to serve on 50th Army's relatively quiet sector until March 1943. In that month, the division was on the right flank of its army during the Third Rzhev–Sychevka Offensive Operation, following up the withdrawal of German 9th Army from the Rzhev salient. Following this it was transferred to the adjacent 49th Army for a larger-scale offensive towards Spas-Demensk, but this was suspended by April 1. By this time the 146th had been transferred to the 49th.

== Operation Suvorov ==
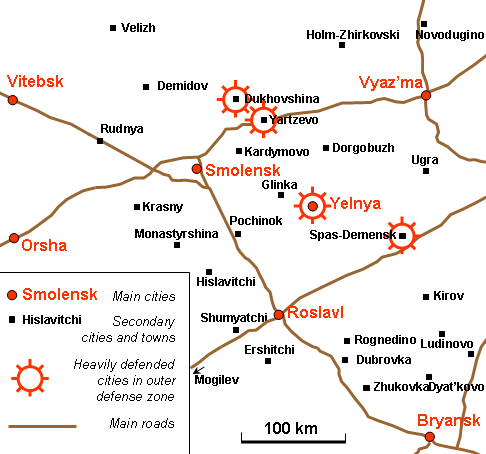
General layout of the Smolensk region during the offensive

Colonel Dulov was reassigned to the 208th Rifle Division on June 8, and was replaced by Col. Nerses Parsievich Baloyan. At the beginning of August the 49th Army consisted of just four rifle divisions, including the 146th, with supporting artillery and the 12 SU-152s of the 1537th Self-Propelled Artillery Regiment, and was under command of Maj. Gen. I. T. Grishin. Western Front was led by Col. Gen. V. D. Sokolovskii. Operation Suvorov began at 0440 hours on August 7 with an artillery preparation which expended 50 percent of the Front's available ammunition in two hours, a harbinger of future difficulties. The main effort was made on the sector from Yelnya to Spas-Demensk by 10th Guards and 33rd Armies. The forces of XII Army Corps (4th Army) were heavily outnumbered, but the terrain was forested and held numerous fortified villages. Although hard pressed, XII Corps managed to prevent a Soviet breakthrough. However, late in the day the 31st Army made significant gains against the inexperienced 113th Infantry Division near Yartsevo.

The offensive was renewed on August 8 after a half-hour of artillery fire, for minimal gains; 49th Army was not directly involved this day or the next. 10th Army, from its positions near Kirov, managed a 5km breakthrough on August 10, and the right flank of 4th Army began falling back to secondary positions. Late the next day XII Corps started retreating to the Yelnya–Spas-Demensk railway, but by now Western Front was almost out of artillery ammunition. Overnight on August 12/13 Spas-Demensk was abandoned, and in the morning the 146th became the first Soviet unit to enter the town, followed by the 42nd Rifle Division and the 256th Tank Brigade of 33rd Army. This Army and the 49th maintained an advance into the void to the southwest, with 5th Mechanized Corps following. A final effort by the two Armies, joined by 21st Army, on August 14-15 failed to budge XII Corps further on its new continuous front, and this was followed by five days of rain. Combined with the shortage of supplies, Sokolovskii was authorized to suspend the offensive for a week on August 21.

The second phase of Suvorov began on August 28. By now the 146th had been incorporated into the 62nd Rifle Corps, along with the 344th and 352nd Rifle Divisions; this was part of a larger expansion of Grishin's army, which now had eight rifle divisions and a rifle brigade. An artillery preparation of 90 minutes began at 0800 hours on a 25km front southeast of Yelnya, which was allotted to 10th Guards, 21st, and 33rd Armies. Sokolovskii focused on the 33rd Army's sector, which was defended by 20th Panzergrenadier Division, and this soon created a gap to be exploited by 5th Mechanized. The 49th and 10th Armies made probing attacks to pin down reserves. The offensive built momentum on August 30 despite renewed rain; by 1330 it was clear to the German command that Yelnya was indefensible and it began to be evacuated. Soviet troops began attacking into the city at 1700 and German rearguards put up just a brief defense. It was now just 75km to Smolensk.

Further elements of 4th Army were pulling back to Roslavl under pressure from 49th and 33rd Armies. But by September 1 Western Front was again running short of fuel, ammunition, and transport, and nine of Sokolovskii's rifle divisions were down to 3,000 personnel or fewer. Attacks continued through the next week, but the new German front could not be broken. On September 7 another halt was called. The offensive began again on September 14, but the 146th played little part because on September 26 it was withdrawn to the Reserve of the Supreme High Command for rebuilding. It returned to the active front on October 15, now as part of 79th Rifle Corps of 3rd Shock Army in the newly-designated 2nd Baltic Front.

== Battle of Nevel ==
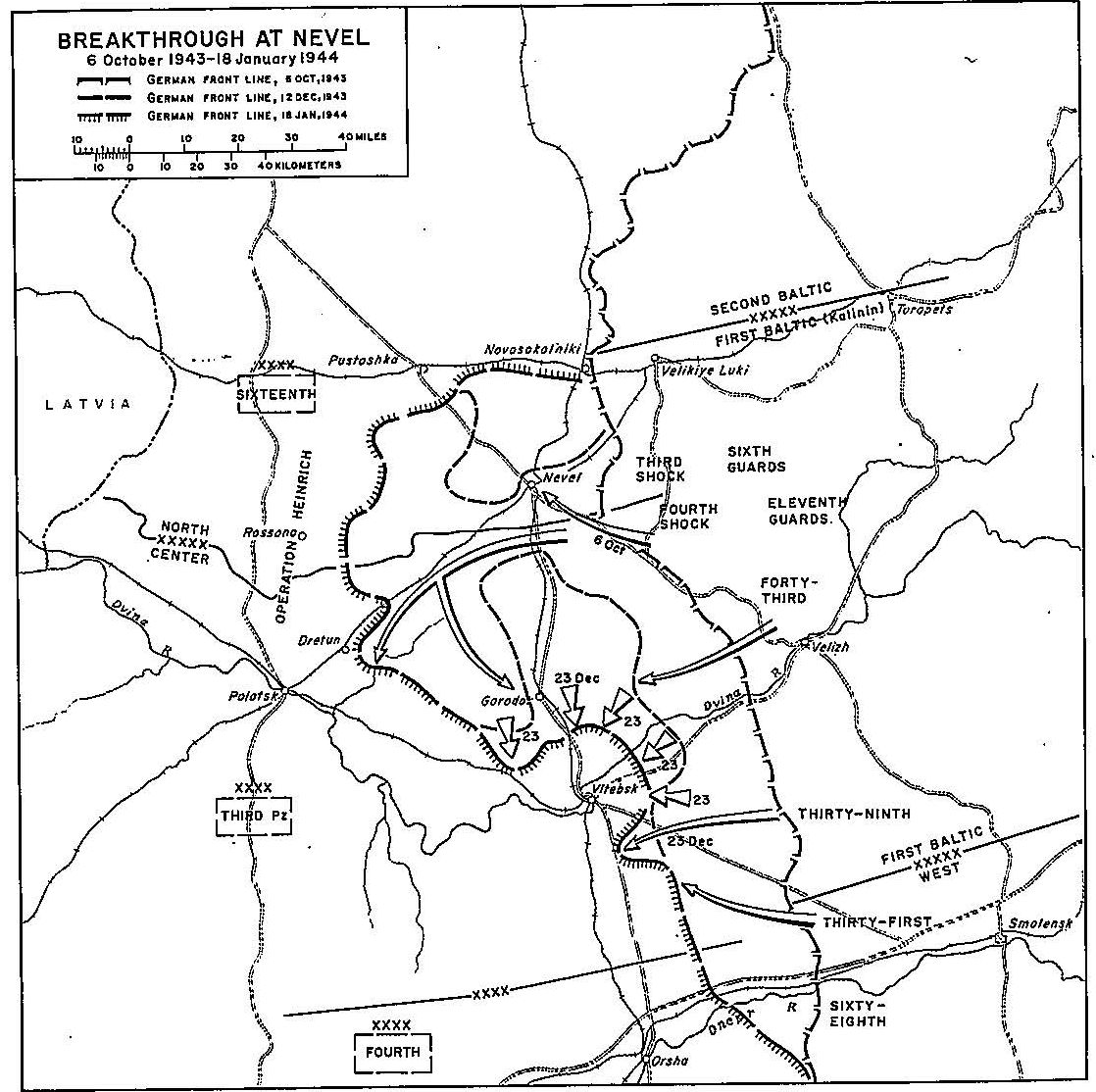
Battle of Nevel (October 1943 - January 1944)

79th Corps also had the 326th Rifle Division under command. On October 6 the 3rd and 4th Shock Armies had scored a surprise success at the boundary of Army Groups North and Center, routing the 2nd Luftwaffe Field Division, and liberating the town of Nevel. As of October 15, 3rd Shock was on the northern flank of the salient, attacking the villages of Moseevo and Izocha with the 100th Rifle Brigade and one regiment of 28th Rifle Division. The remainder of that division soon joined the battle, supported on the right by 93rd Rifle Corps, while 79th Corps joined in on October 17. The attack was contained, but gained improved positions for later attacks.

=== Pustoshka-Idritsa Offensive ===
Those began on November 2 with the start of the Pustoshka-Idritsa offensive. 3rd Shock, led by the 21st and 46th Guards Rifle Divisions, smashed through the defenses of 16th Army's Group von Below, then turned the right flank of the 58th Infantry Division. The 146th and 326th, backed by 78th Tank Brigade, formed an echelon to the left flank and rear. Pivoting northward, the force headed deep into the German rear towards Pustoshka, penetrating more than 30km deep on a 40km front by November 7. During this fighting, on November 5, Colonel Baloyan left the division, being replaced the next day by Col. Grigorii Petrovich Kuchmistii.

The advance had left a long German-held salient that stretched from Novosokolniki nearly as far south as Nevel. Army Group North faced an even more dire situation when 6th Guards Army entered the fighting on November 10 in the lake district northeast of Nevel. By mid-month the 146th and the 115th Rifle Division, plus the 78th Tanks, formed the northwest part of 3rd Shock's salient on the southwest approaches to Pustoshka. The 146th also supplied flank support to the 119th Guards Rifle Division and 118th Tank Brigade's successful attack on the village of Podbereze, which threatened to cut the railway from Novosokolniki to Pustoshka. However, the attempt to penetrate and eliminate the salient was repelled and on November 15 the 6th Guards Army was ordered over to the defense, followed by the remainder of 2nd Baltic Front on November 21. By the end of the month the 146th had been reassigned to the 100th Rifle Corps, still in 3rd Shock. On December 11 Colonel Kuchmistii was replaced by Maj. Gen. Ivan Mikhailovich Nekrasov, who had been commanding the 52nd Guards Rifle Division.

==== Idritsa-Opochka Offensive ====
Under orders from the STAVKA on December 9 the 2nd Baltic Front planned a new effort through Pustoshka toward the town of Idritsa in late December, to begin on the 16th. At this time the 100th Corps had five rifle divisions under command and was defending the western half of the northern protrusion of the salient south of Pustoshka. 3rd Shock was facing two divisions of VIII Army Corps and two of the I Army Corps. In the event the attack was handily repulsed by the defenders after several days. Later that month the 146th left 100th Corps and came under direct Army command.

2nd Baltic planned a new offensive to clear the salient south of Novosokolniki in early January 1944. However this was preempted beginning on December 29 when Field Marshal G. von Küchler, commander of Army Group North, began a phased withdrawal which took place over six days. This caught the Soviets by surprise and while 3rd Shock and 6th Guards Army hastily organized a pursuit this did nothing but harass the retreating Germans. On February 6 General Nekrasov was moved to command of the 46th Guards Rifle Division, and was eventually replaced on February 28 by Maj. Gen. Sergei Isaevich Karapetyan, who had been leading the 46th Guards. He would hold this command until the 146th was disbanded. During January the 146th had been assigned to 90th Rifle Corps, still in 3rd Shock, but in March was shifted to 12th Guards Rifle Corps under direct Front command. Then in April, when that Corps was reassigned to 1st Shock Army the division instead went to the 14th Guards Rifle Corps of that Army, where it remained at the start of the summer offensive.

== Baltic Offensives ==
In early July the division, in the same Corps and Army, was reassigned to 3rd Baltic Front. As the offensive began, the division was facing the German Panther line, directly south of the city of Ostrov. During the following fighting, the division received an honorific:

OSTROV ...146th Rifle Division (Major General Karapetyan, Sergei Isaevich)... The troops who participated in the liberation of Ostrov, by the order of the Supreme High Command of 21 July 1944, and a commendation in Moscow, are given a salute of 12 artillery salvoes from 124 guns.

Following this the division advanced into Estonia, where, on August 25 it assisted in retaking Tartu, and on September 7 it was decorated with the Order of the Red Banner. During this period it had been serving first under 118th Rifle Corps before being assigned to 116th Rifle Corps under direct command of 3rd Baltic Front. In September it returned to 14th Guards Corps and 1st Shock Army. In October the 146th, still in the 14th Guards Rifle Corps, was moved back to 3rd Shock Army, where the division would remain for the duration. While most rifle divisions were receiving larger, more powerful guns, including SU-76s, in their antitank battalions, the 146th continued to use their 45mm pieces, as there was little scope for armor operations in its sector of the front. On November 29 the commander of the 1st Belorussian Front, Marshal Zhukov, received the following:

By order of the Supreme Commander-in-Chief, the following are being transferred to you by railroad:... b) 3rd Shock Army, consisting of:... 7th Rifle Corps (146th, 265th and 364th Rifle Divisions)... along with reinforcements, service establishments and rear organs. The army will arrive approximately between 11 December and 10 January at Lublin station.

A further directive on December 7 ordered that the personnel strength of the Army's nine rifle divisions be reinforced to 6,500 men each, as well as 900 horses. The 146th would remain in 7th Corps for the duration.

== Into Poland and Germany ==
At the start of the Vistula-Oder Offensive in January 1945, 3rd Shock was serving as the reserve of 1st Belorussian Front. It was concentrated in the area of Pilawa–Garwolin–Łaskarzew and was to cross the Vistula in the wake of 1st and 2nd Guards Tank Armies and 7th Guards Cavalry Corps on the third day of the operation. On the morning of the fifth day it was to move in the general direction of Nowe Miasto, Rawa Mazowiecka, Jeżów, and Stryków in preparation to develop the advance in the general direction of Poznań. This plan was largely followed successfully. On January 26 Zhukov reported to the STAVKA on his intentions to develop the offensive and force the Oder River. For its part 3rd Shock was to attack in the general direction of Hofstedt, Gross Spiegel, Repplin and Fiddichow, with the objectives of reaching a line through Hofstedt on the first day, reaching the line of the Oder on the sixth day, and then make a crossing in sector Harz–Schwedt before proceeding to Fiddichow. In the event this plan was largely abandoned due to the growing gap between 1st and 2nd Belorussian Fronts and the German threat to the flanks, which led to the East Pomeranian Offensive.

=== East Pomeranian Offensive ===
Three armies of 2nd Belorussian renewed their offensive on February 10. 70th Army was on the Front's left flank, sharing a boundary with 3rd Shock on 1st Belorussian's right. Working together, the two Armies made a fighting advance up to 40km in five days, with 70th Army seizing Chojnice on February 14. Apart from this, the right flank armies of 1st Belorussian made very little progress during the first half of February against stiff resistance from German 11th Army. Before the offensive was renewed on February 24 most of 3rd Shock was relieved by 2nd Belorussian's 19th Army. Zhukov now concentrated his shock group on the sector Merkisch Friedland–Arnswalde, with the objective of splitting 11th Army and reaching the Baltic coast and the Oder from Kolberg to Altdamm to Zeden. Kolberg was reached on March 4, and Altdamm was taken on March 20, after which the Front began to redeploy for the Berlin Offensive.

== Battle of Berlin ==
At the start of the final offensive on the German capital the 3rd Shock Army, now under command of Col. Gen. V. I. Kuznetsov, was deployed in the bridgehead over the Oder at Küstrin on a 11km-wide sector from Ortwig to Letschin. Kuznetsov planned to make his main strike with his left flank, a 6km sector from Amt Kienitz to Letschin. 7th Corps consisted of the same divisions as previously and formed the Army's second echelon. At this time the rifle divisions' strengths varied between 5,000 and 6,000 men each. The divisions in first echelon had the immediate goal of penetrating the defense to a depth of 4.5-5km, which would carry them through the first two German positions. The Army had the 9th Tank Corps, with 333 tanks, in second echelon with 7th Corps, in addition to 136 tanks and self-propelled guns of its own. 122 of these were deployed on the breakthrough sector. In order to hide the Army's deployment into the bridgehead the reconnaissance on April 14 was carried out by three divisions of 5th Shock Army, part of whose positions had been taken over by 3rd Shock.

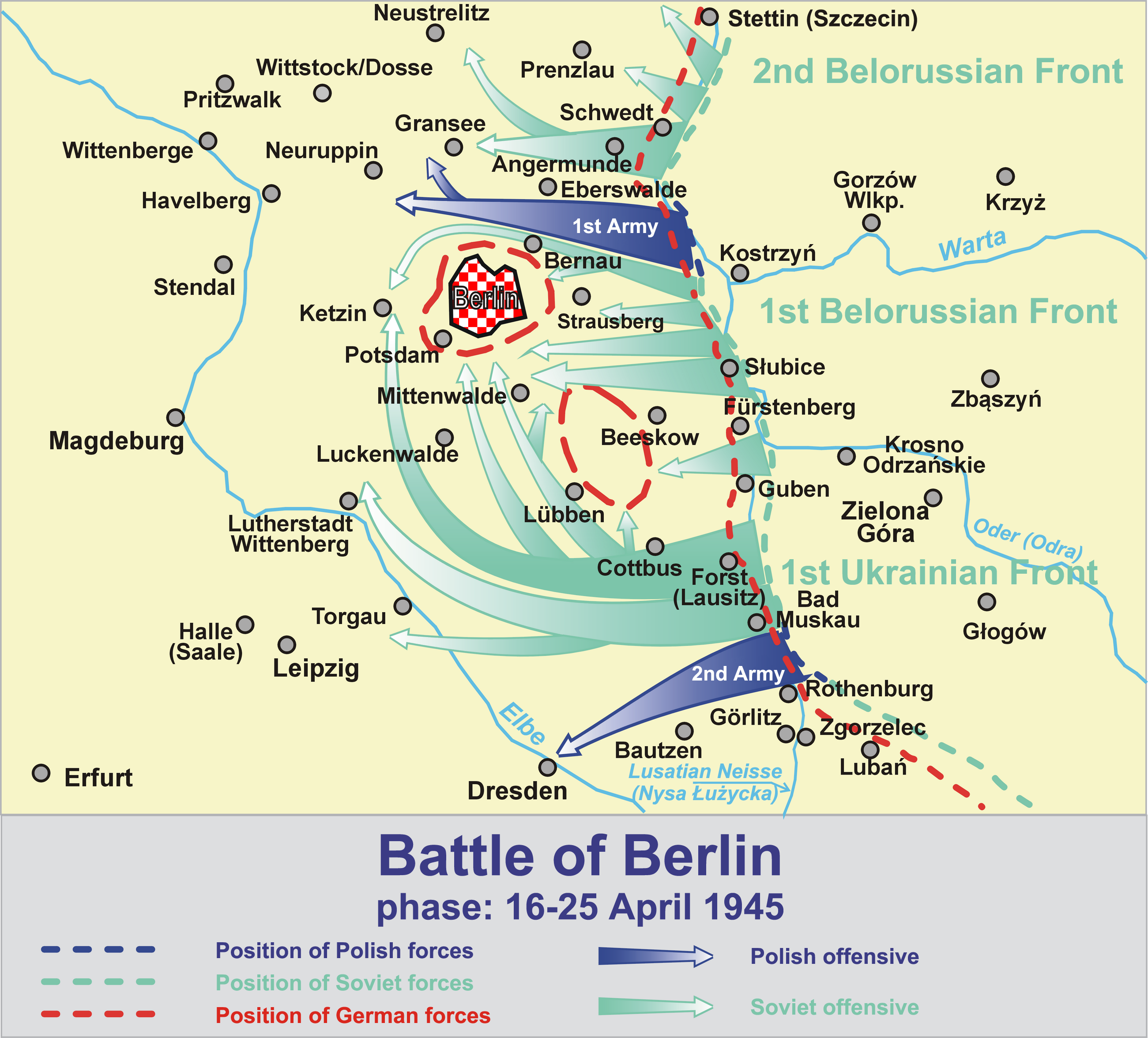
Battle of Berlin. Note location of the Küstrin (Kostrzyn) bridgehead.

Kuznetsov began his reconnaissance on April 15, with several reinforced battalions of the first echelon, backed by artillery and mortars, gaining up to 500m. When the main offensive began the next day 3rd Shock attacked at 0520 hours, following a 20-minute artillery preparation. In an innovation introduced by Zhukov, the attacking infantry and supporting tanks were "assisted" by 20 searchlights to illuminate the defenses, although the results across the Front were mixed. In order to increase the pace of the attack the 9th Tanks was committed on the 79th Corps' sector at 1000. The strongpoints of Ortwig and Gross Barnim were taken and by the end of the day the Corps had reached the canal 1000m east of Neutrebbin after an advance of 8km. 7th Corps crossed the Oder by the end of the day and concentrated north of Letschin.

Zhukov ordered the offensive be continued through the night with the intention of breaking through the second zone of defense. This was to be preceded by a 30-40 minute artillery preparation. As morning broke on April 17 German resistance remained stubborn. 3rd Shock resumed attacking at 0800 hours, facing the remnants of the 309th Infantry Division, the 25th Panzergrenadier Division, and part of the 1st Luftwaffe Field Division in the Kunersdorf area. 7th Corps, still in Army reserve, was not committed this day or the next, but instead concentrated near Neutrebbin and Neu Friedland. In order to complete the encirclement of Berlin as quickly as possible the axes of the Front's right wing armies (3rd Shock, 5th Shock, 47th) were altered from northwest and west to west and southwest, and they were also directed to attack day and night. On April 19 the lead elements of 3rd Shock overcame heavy fire resistance, a large number of forest obstructions and minefields, and covered 12km, breaking through the third defense zone, while 7th Corps moved to concentrate in and around the wooded area northeast of Batzlow.

=== Breaking into Berlin ===
3rd Shock continued to fight through the night of April 19/20, particularly in the wooded area near Prötzel, where 7th Corps, still in reserve, formed up by dusk. At 1350 hours the long-range artillery of 79th Corps fired the first two salvoes on Berlin, and at 2230 struck the Reichstag with a bombardment. At 0600 on April 21 the 171st Rifle Division of 79th Corps broke into the northeast outskirts of the city but 7th Corps remained in second echelon, although its advance guard began fighting for Hohenschönhausen. The next day Zhukov ordered 3rd Shock and 2nd Guards Tank Army to break into the northeastern outskirts of the city to prevent a defense from being established on the inner defense line. Kuznetsov's troops, backed by 1st Mechanized Corps and again attacking through the night, threw back scattered groups of 1st Luftwaffe Field Division, 11th SS Nordland Division, the 309th Infantry Division, and various elements of the Volkssturm.

3rd Shock, still with 1st Mechanized, resumed its assault at 0900 hours on April 22 and spent the day in heavy fighting in northeastern Berlin. The German command was throwing in an odd assortment of forces, including platoons of panzerfaust carriers and antiaircraft guns in the antitank role. During the day Kuznetsov fully committed 7th Corps from second echelon. As the 698th Rifle Regiment entered the fighting one of its battalions deployed a special assault company mainly of Komsomols and led by Komsomol organizer Jr. Lt. Vyacheslav Fyodorovich Zatylkov. In the course of the fighting the company cut the ring railroad, and Zatylkov himself was responsible for destroying three pillboxes, causing some 30 German casualties. On May 15, 1946, he would be made a Hero of the Soviet Union for this feat. He continued to serve in the Soviet Army until August 1975 in Kyiv, largely as an instructor. On May 5, 2008, he was officially given the rank of major general of the Armed Forces of Ukraine, but died on September 22, at the age of 83. By the end of the day the main shock group of 1st Belorussian Front had outflanked the city from the east and the north, and only 15km separated the 8th Guards Army from 1st Ukrainian Front's 3rd Guards Tank Army. The next day Zhukov ordered his right-flank and center armies to continue their assigned tasks. 3rd Shock, now also reinforced with 12th Guards Tank Corps, continued its struggle in Berlin's northern and northeastern sectors, largely against an assortment of volkssturm units and guns of the city's antiaircraft defenses. The Army and its supporting forces cleared a number of city blocks and reached the Lichtenberg–Wittenau railroad.

On April 24 the Army was directed to continue its attack in the northwestern part of the city, with the objective of reaching the Spree River on a sector from Siemensstadt to Lichtenberg station, facing tough resistance from defenders in Berlin's 7th, 8th, and 1st Sectors. An advance of 8km was obtained, which effectively cleared the northwestern part of the city, and on its right flank reached the Berlin–Spandauer Schifffarts Canal, seizing bridgeheads on the south bank with the 207th Rifle Division. At noon on April 25 the encirclement of the city was completed when 47th Army linked up with 1st Ukrainian Front's 4th Guards Tank Army. Throughout the day 3rd Shock was effectively stalled in intense fighting, with several blocks being taken in the eastern part of Siemensstadt.

==== Fighting in the City Center ====
7th Corps, along with 12th Guards Rifle Corps, had some success on April 25 in breaking a line south and southwest of Weißensee, entering the center of Berlin. For the final push 3rd Shock, with 9th Tanks and other attachments, had 75,314 personnel on strength, second-largest of the Front's armies. The next day the Army still faced heavy resistance, with 7th Corps engaged in several city blocks near Friedrichshain Park. Altogether, 3rd Shock cleared some 60 blocks. The Berlin garrison was split during the day, with a larger part in the center and a smaller part in the Potsdam area. April 27 saw the Army advance southeast toward the Tiergarten, aiming to link up with 8th Guards Army. 7th and 12th Guards Corps fought along a 10km-wide front, still facing a stiff defense, and made only small gains to the south. Early on April 28 the commander of the Berlin garrison informed Hitler that the fighting could not continue more than two days due to lack of ammunition and requested permission to break out, which was refused. General Kuznetsov regrouped 12th Guards Corps, but it and 7th Corps continued to make insignificant gains while 79th Corps advanced on the Reichstag.

Early on April 29, 3rd Shock was reinforced with 38th Rifle Corps from the Front reserve to expedite the drive on the Reichstag. Through the next day, as 79th Corps carried out its storming operation, 7th Corps, with the reinforcing 38th Corps, remained stalled on most axes. However, German resistance was beginning to collapse with Hitler's death, and the fighting effectively ended on May 2.

== Postwar ==
On June 11 the 146th as a whole was honored for its part in the capture of Berlin with the Order of Suvorov, 2nd Degree, while its 280th Artillery Regiment received the Order of Alexander Nevsky. Its men and women now shared the full title of 146th Rifle, Ostrov, Order of the Red Banner, Order of Suvorov Division. (Russian: 146-я стрелковая Островская Краснознамённая ордена Суворова дивизия.) After the war the division continued to serve in the 3rd Shock Army as part of the Group of Soviet Forces in Germany. In February 1946 it was sent to the Kiev Military District and disbanded there in June 1946.

In 1954, a 146th was reformed from the 10th Machine Gun Artillery Division at Poltavka with the 25th Army in the Far Eastern Military District. This division was disbanded on July 25, 1956.
