= Alexander Mavrichev =

Soviet Army major general

Alexander Ivanovich Mavrichev
- Mavrichev, c. 1941–1942
- Born: 21 July 1901; Bolshoye Novoye village, Cherepovetsky Uyezd, Novgorod Governorate, Russian Empire
- Died: 12 September 1974 (aged 73) Ulyanovsk, Soviet Union
- Allegiance: Russian SFSR; Soviet Union
- Branch: Red Army (later Soviet Army)
- Service years: 1919–1951
- Rank: Major general
- Commands: 33rd Rifle Division; 121st Rifle Division; 108th Rifle Division
- Conflicts: Russian Civil War; World War II
- Awards: Order of Lenin (2); Order of the Red Banner (3); Order of the Patriotic War, 1st class

Alexander Ivanovich Mavrichev (Russian: Александр Иванович Мавричев; 21 July 1901 – 12 September 1974) was a Soviet Army major general.

Drafted into the Red Army during the Russian Civil War, Mavrichev fought on the Eastern Front and after the end of the war spent several years in command positions with the Internal Troops. He returned to army units in the mid-1920s and held battalion commands in the late 1920s and 1930s. During the late 1930s he quickly advanced from regimental to division command and upon the outbreak of Operation Barbarossa commanded a rifle division in Belarus. Mavrichev and his division were encircled in the first weeks of the war, and he spent several months making his way back to Soviet lines. He never held another combat command and spent the rest of the war in army and front staff positions. Postwar, he served as chief of officer training courses and retired in 1951.

== Early life and Russian Civil War ==
Mavrichev was born to a peasant family on 21 July 1901 in the village of Bolshoye Novoye, Vakhnovsky volost, Cherepovetsky Uyezd, Novgorod Governorate, and graduated from the village school in 1913. Drafted into the Red Army during the Russian Civil War on 6 March 1919, he was sent to the 103rd Brigade of the 35th Rifle Division in Kazan. As a telephonist of a rifle regiment of the brigade, he fought on the Eastern Front against the forces of Alexander Kolchak. Mavrichev became chief of communications of the engineering and construction units of the 5th Army in April 1920 and from September of that year studied at the infantry department of the Siberian Higher Military School. He became a Communist Party member during the same year. Upon graduation in April 1922, Mavrichev became a company commander of the 62nd Rifle Regiment of the People's Revolutionary Army of the satellite Far Eastern Republic.

== Interwar period ==
After the end of the war, Mavrichev briefly served as assistant chief of the Chita Escort Detachment of the GPU Troops from December 1922, in January 1923 was appointed chief of the Blagoveshchensk Escort Detachment of the Amur Governorate Border Detachment of the GPU Troops. From May of that year he served as chief and then assistant chief of the 32nd Blagoveshchensk Cavalry School of the GPU Troops of the Far Eastern District, and in December returned to army units to become a company commander of the 62nd Novorossiysk Rifle Regiment, now part of the 21st Rifle Division of the Siberian Military District. Transferred to the Tomsk Infantry School to serve as a company commander in September 1924, Mavrichev entered the Siberian Advanced Commanders' Courses in October 1926 and after completing them in August 1927 returned to his previous position at the Tomsk Infantry School.

After commanding a battalion of the 34th Rifle Regiment of the 12th Rifle Division of the same district from July 1928, Mavrichev served with the district staff from May 1931 as assistant chief of the 5th department (combat training). He became a battalion commander at the Omsk Infantry School in June 1932 before graduating from the Vystrel course in 1935. Transferred to the Belorussian Military District in August 1937 to serve as commander of the 14th Rifle Regiment of the 5th Rifle Division. Mavrichev took command of the 33rd Rifle Division in July 1938 and then the newly formed 121st Rifle Division in August 1939. Promoted to kombrig on 4 November 1939, he was transferred back to the Siberian Military District in February 1940 to serve as chief of the Urechensk Infantry Commanders' Improvement Courses for reservists, but returned to Belarus in March 1941 to command the 108th Rifle Division of the 44th Rifle Corps of the Western Special Military District (the former Belorussian Special Military District). Mavrichev was made a major general when the Red Army reintroduced generals' ranks on 4 June 1940.

== World War II ==
When Operation Barbarossa, the German invasion of the Soviet Union, began on 22 June 1941, the division departed from summer camp at Dorogobuzh to the Ratomka camp 40 kilometres (25 miles) west of Minsk. On 25 June, it arrived at the latter, utilizing the defenses of the Minsk Fortified Region. The Western Front command requisitioned the division's anti-tank artillery, twelve machine guns from each regiment, and detached one of the rifle regiments. For the next six days the division fought as part of the 13th Army against the German advance, being encircled from 28 June. On 1 July, Mavrichev and the remnants of the division left the encirclement with a group led by 3rd Army commander General Vasily Kuznetsov, heading towards Rogachev and Bykhov. In mid-August there were only 45 personnel left with the group, which was surrounded and scattered by German troops in the area of Dedovo on 15 August. Mavrichev managed to escape with six others and joined the partisan detachment led by former 64th Rifle Division commander Colonel Sergey Iovlev. With the latter, he reached Soviet lines on 26 September in the sector of the 29th Army near Bely.

Placed at the disposal of the staff of the Western Front and the Main Personnel Directorate, Mavrichev was appointed chief of the combat training department of the 60th (later the 3rd Shock) Army in late November 1941 and in this position participated in fighting on the Northwestern Front. In April 1942 he was transferred to hold the same position for the 53rd Army and from May served as chief of staff of the rear directorate of the Northwestern Front, holding the latter position until August 1944, when he became chief of the trophy directorate of the 1st Ukrainian Front, responsible for captured equipment. He ended the war in this position.

== Postwar ==
After the end of the war, Mavrichev was appointed chief inspector of the Red Army Trophy Directorate in May 1945. In August he became chief of the Infantry Officers' Improvement Courses of the Special Military District in Königsberg. From September 1946 he was chief of the Volga Infantry Officers' Improvement Courses of the Volga Military District. He was relieved of his position in September 1950 and retired in March 1951. Mavrichev died on 12 September 1974 in Ulyanovsk, and was buried in the North cemetery of the city.

== Awards and honors ==
Mavrichev received the following decorations:

- Order of Lenin (2)
- Order of the Red Banner (3)
- Order of the Patriotic War, 1st class
