= 44th Rifle Corps =

- Allegiance: Soviet Union
- Branch: Red Army
- Engagements: Eastern Front (World War II); Operation Barbarossa

The 44th Rifle Corps was a corps of the Red Army of the Soviet Union. It took part in the Great Patriotic War in 1941 and 1943-45.

The headquarters of the 44th Rifle Corps was formed in March 1941 in the Western Special Military District. Major General Vasily Yushkevich was appointed corps commander, and Colonel Anton Ivanovich Vinogradov chief of staff.

On 22 June 1941, the corps consisted of the 64th Rifle Division and the 108th Rifle Division (General Major Alexander Mavrichev on 22 June 1941). Sources are unclear whether the corps was assigned to the 13th Army that day or directly responsible to the Western Special Military District. Two days later the WSMD became the Western Front.

The corps headquarters and its signal battalion arrived at Volkhov railway station from the Smolensk direction late on 7 September to bring the headquarters of the 54th Army up to strength. The corps headquarters was disbanded the following day on September 8 and its personnel transferred to the headquarters of the 54th Army.

== Commanders ==
- Major General Vasily Yushkevich (04.03.1941 - 11.09.1941),
- Major General Michail Kleshnin (26.05.1943 - 11.05.1945)
