= 352nd Rifle Division =

352nd Rifle Division (August 1, 1941 – 1945)
- Col. Yu. M. Prokofev (prewar)
- Active: 1941–1945
- Country: Soviet Union
- Branch: Red Army
- Type: Division
- Role: Infantry
- Engagements: Battle of Moscow; Battles of Rzhev; Battle of Smolensk (1943); Operation Bagration; Vistula-Oder Offensive; Battle of Königsberg; Prague Offensive
- Decorations: Order of the Red Banner; Order of Suvorov 2nd class
- Battle honours: Orsha

Commanders
- Notable commanders: Col. Yurii Mikhailovich Prokofev; Col. Andrei Prokofevich Maltzev; Maj. Gen. Mikhail Pronin; Maj. Gen. Nikolai Mikhailovich Strizhenko; Col. Viktor Ivanovich Rutko; Maj. Gen. Rakhim Sagib Gareevich Maksutov

The 352nd Rifle Division started forming in August 1941, as a standard Red Army rifle division, at Bugulma in Tatarstan. When it entered the fighting it was assigned to the Western Front before Moscow, and it would remain in that Front for most of the war; when Western Front was dissolved the division went to one of its successor Fronts and served there until the last few weeks. It took part in the first Soviet winter counteroffensive, then played peripheral roles in the battles around the Rzhev salient, before advancing in the offensive that liberated Smolensk in the summer of 1943. After a series of frustrating attempts during the autumn and winter of 1943-44, the city of Orsha was finally liberated in the opening days of Operation Bagration, and the 352nd was recognized for its role in the battle. Soon after it was further decorated for its part in the liberation of Grodno. In the winter of 1945 the 352nd took part in the invasion of East Prussia and the capture of Königsberg, but in April it finally was swung off its very straightforward combat path when it and its 31st Army were transferred to 1st Ukrainian Front advancing into Czechoslovakia. Soon after the German surrender the division was slated as one of those to be disbanded in place in central Europe.

== Formation ==
The division began forming on August 1, 1941, in the Volga Military District at Bugulma. Its first commander, Col. Yurii Mikhailovich Prokofev, was assigned the same day. Its basic order of battle was as follows:

- 1158th Rifle Regiment
- 1160th Rifle Regiment
- 1162nd Rifle Regiment
- 914th Artillery Regiment

At the time it was forming the division's personnel was noted as containing a "high percentage of Tatars", which is unsurprising, given the location. The 352nd remained in Volga District until November 28, when it was ordered by STAVKA to join the 20th Army in the Moscow region. It departed Bugulma the next day and covered 1,250 km by rail over three days, arriving in Khimki early on December 2, an average of 400 km per day despite conditions of enemy air attack during the latter stages.

=== Battle of Moscow ===
As the division concentrated in the Khimki area on December 2, Western Front ordered 20th Army to go over to the offensive to seize the area of Krasnaya Polyana, Vladychino and Kholmy. Over the course of the next day the 331st Rifle Division and two rifle brigades advanced up to 2 km towards Krasnaya Polyana. The fighting for this village went on through December 6 against a stubborn defense by a battalion of the 106th Infantry Division, with tanks. The next day the 352nd was ordered to withdraw from this fight and concentrate in the area of Marfino in order to continue the offensive to the west. On December 11 the commander of 20th Army, Maj. Gen. A. A. Vlasov, ordered his forces to take Solnechnogorsk, where the division was to concentrate along with the 7th Guards Mortar Battalion. In the event encircling moves by other elements of the Army forced the enemy to abandon this town, and by evening the division had reached Peshki, helping to capture four tanks, 13 motor vehicles, seven mortars and 13 artillery pieces. Over the following week the 352nd continued to act as the Army reserve and on December 17 was concentrated in the area of Shapkino and Stegachevo.

By January 1, 1942, 20th Army had reached a line roughly along the Lama River and was fighting to improve its positions to continue the offensive to the west. During the night of January 1–2, the 1162nd Rifle Regiment, the 1st Battalion of the 1160th Regiment, and the 64th Rifle Brigade, backed by tanks, waged a fierce fight for the village of Birkino, which failed despite killing up to 40 enemy officers and soldiers; Birkino was finally liberated on January 4. On January 9 the division was ordered to destroy the enemy in the Timonino area with the support of the 537th Artillery Regiment and the 2nd Guards Mortar Battalion. The offensive of 2oth Army began with an artillery preparation at 0900 hrs. on January 10, and an infantry assault, backed by artillery and tanks, at 1030. The forward edge of the German defense was broken quite quickly but at no small cost to the attackers. With the help of the 49th Rifle Brigade (which was backed by a single KV tank and four T-34s) the 352nd captured Timonino by 1330, and then continued its offensive towards Kaleevo, Bolshoe Goloperovo and Afanasovo. In this fighting an enemy battalion was destroyed, with up to 250 corpses left on the battlefield, while the division's units captured three antiaircraft guns and four mortars, and destroyed an ammunition dump. Due to enemy resistance and heavy snow the Army was limited to an advance of 2 – 3 km on this day. Command control was "carried out comparatively well" with communications "maintained by radio and telephone... periodically with the 352nd Rifle Division." By January 13 the offensive had progressed to the point that General Vlasov ordered his mobile group, 2nd Guards Cavalry Corps, into the breach, with the 352nd moving from Bolvasova to Vysokovo behind the cavalry's forward detachments. On the following day the 2nd Guards was held up by a German force of up to two battalions along a line from Vysokovo to Chukholovo, but this position was broken in part by the division and its attached artillery; but the end of the day the cavalry was fighting westwards and the Germans were falling back on Gzhatsk.

On January 17, 20th Army was pursuing the German forces on all their avenues of retreat. The main forces on the Army's right flank, including the 352nd, had reached as far south as the Ruza River. This advance continued over the next week, but the redeployment of 1st Shock and 16th Armies from the right flank of Western Front left 20th Army on a 40 km front facing Gzhatsk alone, and for these reasons the operation came to a standstill on January 25.

== In Western Front ==
In the last days of February 1942, the division was transferred to 5th Army, still in Western Front, where it would remain until August 1943. Colonel Prokovev relinquished command of the division on June 5, and was replaced by Lt. Col. Andrei Prokofevich Maltzev, who was promoted to the rank of Colonel on June 27.

Maj. Gen. M. A. Pronin

In the planning for Operation Mars, 5th Army was intended to participate in a widening offensive, after German 9th Army was encircled and defeated, through Vyasma to link up with forces of Kalinin Front near Smolensk to destroy Army Group Center. In the event, 9th Army was able to hold out, and this operation did not come to pass. On February 6, 1943, Maj. Gen. Mikhail Pronin took command of the division, which he would hold until June 2. In the aftermath of Operation Mars, on February 22, the 352nd, with the 29th Guards Rifle Division, assaulted the positions of German 4th Army's 35th Infantry Division east of Gzhatsk, tearing a small breach in the division's defenses. 5th Army then committed the 153rd Tank Brigade, plus a ski battalion, and later a full ski brigade, into the gap. After days of heavy fighting the exploiting forces were encircled and mostly destroyed by German counterattacks. The Front shut down until the German forces began evacuating the Rzhev salient in March. General Pronin, who would go on to be named a Hero of the Soviet Union in 1945 while leading the 16th Guards Rifle Division, was succeeded in command by Col. M. T. Ilin through the summer months.

Shortly after the start of the summer offensive towards Smolensk in August, the division was transferred to 49th Army, where it would remain until the spring of the following year. It was also assigned to 62nd Rifle Corps at this time, but by the beginning of October it was back to being an independent division within its Army. As Western Front tried to continue its offensive into eastern Belorussia in early October, forward elements of 49th Army reached the Pronya River late on October 2. The 352nd was south of the town of Drybin. The strong German defenses in this region, manned by their 342nd and 35th Infantry Divisions, along with the weakness of his Army after months of offensive combat, convinced Col. Gen. I. T. Grishin that any further offensive action would be futile.

Beginning on October 12, Western Front began a new offensive towards Orsha. This was preceded by a complex regrouping of forces, in which 33rd Army was moved into the sector north and south of Lenino. In response, 49th Army's forces shifted north into the positions vacated by 33rd Army. From October 12–14, 352nd and 344th Rifle Divisions moved from the Drybin area into the sectors vacated by 33rd Army. After about five weeks in command, on October 25 Col. K. S. Kovalev was succeeded by Maj. Gen. Nikolai Mikhailovich Strizhenko, who would remain in command until October 13, 1944, apart from a break from August 5 to September 25, 1943.

In March 1944, Western Front began yet another offensive against Orsha. At this time the division was back in 62nd Corps, and was in the first echelon of the attack as part of the Army's shock group. The Corps was to attack in the sector extending from Lazyrshchina southward to Lobany against the center section of 78th Sturm Division's sector; 63rd and 352nd Rifle Divisions would back up 247th Rifle Division in the lead. During the course of this offensive, the division was briefly redeployed into the sector of 31st Army, but by April 1 was, with its Corps, in 33rd Army. This renewed attack made virtually no progress and was shut down in April.

=== Operation Bagration ===
Later that month, Western Front was broken up into the 2nd and 3rd Belorussian Fronts. During this transition, the 352nd was assigned to the 113th Rifle Corps of 31st Army of 3rd Belorussian Front; it would remain in that Army, apart from one brief period in 1945, for the duration of the war. When the offensive began, 31st Army was facing the 260th Infantry and 25th Panzergrenadier divisions of the German XXVII Army Corps across the Dniepr River. In part due to the water obstacle the Army's offensive developed slowly over the first few days, but once the Dniepr was crossed the town of Dubrovno was reached on June 25, just 15 km east of Orsha. On June 27, the division was given credit for its role in the liberation of the city of Orsha and received its name as an honorific:

"ORSHA - ...352nd Rifle Division (Major General Strizhenko, Nikolai Mikhailovich)... By order of the Supreme High Command of 27 June 1944 and a commendation in Moscow, the troops who participated in the battles for the liberation of Orsha are given a salute of 20 artillery salvoes from 224 guns."

On July 25 the division was further distinguished with a unit award of the Order of the Red Banner for its service in the liberation of Grodno.

== Into Germany and Czechoslovakia ==
On October 14, General Strizhenko was replaced in command by Col. Viktor Ivanovich Rutko. One month later the 352nd was recognized for its participation in the battles along the borders of East Prussia with the Order of Suvorov, 2nd class. At the start of the Vistula-Oder Offensive in January 1945, the division was in the 36th Rifle Corps of 31st Army, but before the end of the month the Corps was taken under direct Front command. During the advance on Königsberg the 352nd, with its Corps, was assigned to the 5th Army, before returning to 31st Army by the end of March. On March 22, Maj. Gen. Rakhim Sagib Gareevich Maksutov took command of the division, which he would hold for the duration. In April, the entire 31st Army was shifted out of 3rd Belorussian Front and moved south. In the last three weeks of the war the 352nd Division and its Army were under the command of 1st Ukrainian Front, advancing into Czechoslovakia.

== Postwar ==
The division held the full title of 352nd Rifle, Orsha, Order of the Red Banner, Order of Suvorov Division [Russian: 352-я стрелковая Оршанская Краснознамённая ордена Суворова дивизия] when the fighting came to an end. According to STAVKA Order No. 11096 of May 29, 1945, part 8, the 352nd is listed as one of the rifle divisions to be "disbanded in place".
