= 154th Rifle Division =

154th Rifle Division (June 20, 1940 – October 20, 1942) 154th Rifle Division (May 18, 1943 – February 1946)
- Active: 1940–1946
- Country: Soviet Union
- Branch: Red Army
- Type: Infantry
- Size: Division
- Engagements: Battle of Smolensk (1941); Battle of Moscow; Battle of Bryansk (1941); Defense of Tula; Kozelsk offensive Smolensk operation Polotsk–Vitebsk Offensive; Vitebsk (Gorodok) Offensive; Operation Bagration; Vitebsk-Polotsk offensive Baltic offensive Operation Doppelkopf; Riga offensive (1944); Vistula-Oder offensive East Prussian offensive Heiligenbeil Pocket; Battle of Königsberg; Samland offensive
- Decorations: Order of Suvorov (2nd Formation)

Commanders
- Notable commanders: Maj. Gen. Yakov Stepanovich Fokanov; Col. Konstantin Nikolaevich Nikulin; Maj. Gen. Gavriil Dmitrievich Sokolov; Maj. Gen. Aleksei Prokofevich Moskalenko; Col. Nikolai Lvovich Volkov

The 154th Rifle Division was first formed as an infantry division of the Red Army in June 1940 in the Volga Military District, based on the shtat (table of organization and equipment) of the previous September. Just before the war with Germany began it had started moving west as part of 66th Rifle Corps in 21st Army, with orders to concentrate around Gomel as its Army came under command of Western Front. In early July this Army was involved in an ambitious effort to counterattack into the flank of 2nd Panzer Group, and later across the Dniepr River against the German infantry that was advancing toward Babruysk and then Rahachow to Zhlobin. In early August the division was forced back across the Dniepr with its 63rd Rifle Corps, and was soon encircled northwest of Gomel and forced to break out with heavy casualties. Its remnants fell back to join Bryansk Front, and spent September rebuilding and constructing fortifications. When the final German offensive on Moscow began at the end of the month the 154th was west of Bryansk and in the first week of October attempted to contest the city before falling back to the east. After escaping another encirclement with heavy casualties, now as part of 50th Army, it retreated first to Belyov and then formed a core of the defense of the city of Tula, which was successfully defended into early December, after which Western Front went over to the counteroffensive. Late in the month two of the 154th's rifle regiments formed the main infantry component of a special mobile group that successfully thrust behind German lines to liberate the city of Kaluga. After this was taken on December 30 the division pushed on toward Yukhnov, which finally fell on March 5, 1942. It was now removed to the Reserve of the Supreme High Command and assigned to the new 3rd Tank Army as its only rifle division. At the outset of the German summer offensive it was moved south from the Tula area with its Army to take up a position on the northern flank of the German drive. In late August and early September it took part in a largely abortive counteroffensive in the Kozelsk area; it distinguished itself sufficiently that on October 20 it became the 47th Guards Rifle Division.

A new 154th was formed in the Moscow Military District in May 1943, based on a pair of rifle brigades. As it formed it came under command of 68th Army in the Reserve of the Supreme High Command but the Army was assigned to Western Front in July, prior to the start of the summer offensive toward Smolensk. After seeing action in August it was reassigned to 5th Army late in the month, then again to Kalinin Front in September, soon joining 4th Shock Army. Under this command it was involved in the battles to expand the breakthrough south of Nevel toward Haradok and eventually on Vitebsk. The complicated and frustrating fighting for the latter place continued through the winter without decisive success, and prior to the summer offensive the 154th was transferred to 6th Guards Army, north and west of the German-held salient. Initially in the Army's reserve it was soon assigned to the 103rd Rifle Corps and took part in the fighting for Polotsk. As the offensive continued into the Baltic states the division briefly moved to 43rd Army during Operation Doppelkopf, but returned to 6th Guards until December when it was reassigned to 2nd Guards Army's 60th Rifle Corps in 3rd Belorussian Front, and it would remain under these commands for the duration. The offensive into East Prussia began on January 13, 1945 and 2nd Guards initially played a secondary role, but soon the 154th and its Corps was in the forefront of the advance on Königsberg and, in March, the elimination of the German forces southwest of that place, for which it was awarded the Order of Suvorov. It took part in the battle for the city in April, and ended the war clearing the Samland Peninsula. Following the German surrender it remained in this area until February 1946, when it was disbanded.

== 1st Formation ==
The 154th began forming on June 20, 1940, at Ulyanovsk in the Volga Military District. Its personnel were recruited from several nationalities of the Volga region, including Russians, Tatars, Bashkirs, Chuvashes, and others. At the time of the German invasion a year later it was near full establishment strength with 12,796 personnel and a nearly full complement of equipment, with the exception of 76mm cannons. Its order of battle was as follows:

- 437th Rifle Regiment
- 473rd Rifle Regiment
- 510th Rifle Regiment
- 571st Artillery Regiment (from September 12, 1941)
- 580th Howitzer Regiment (until August 29, 1941)
- 143rd Antitank Battalion
- 278th Antiaircraft Battery (later 464th Antiaircraft Battalion)
- 239th Reconnaissance Battalion
- 212th Sapper Battalion
- 292nd Signal Company (from August 22, 1942 292nd Signal Battalion)
- 183rd Medical/Sanitation Battalion
- 173rd Chemical Defense (Anti-gas) Company (later 154th)
- 182nd Motor Transport Battalion
- 350th Field Bakery (later 154th Motorized Field Bakery)
- 122nd Divisional Veterinary Hospital
- 154th Divisional Artillery Workshop
- 670th Field Postal Station
- 539th Field Office of the State Bank

Col. Yakov Stepanovich Fokanov had taken command of the division on July 16, 1940. This officer had previously led the 61st and 129th Rifle Divisions and came to the 154th from the 18th Reserve Rifle Brigade, and would be promoted to the rank of major general on July 31, 1941. When the war began the division was in 66th Rifle Corps, which also contained the 61st and 117th Rifle Divisions. As part of 21st Army it was on the move by rail toward Belarus. The Army was in the STAVKA Group of Reserve Armies

=== Battles in Belarus ===
By July 1, 66th Corps had the 154th and 232nd Rifle Divisions under command. On July 2, as the division joined the fighting, Marshal S. K. Timoshenko took over command of Western Front, which included the 21st, which would soon be led by Col. Gen. F. I. Kuznetsov. The Army, which was anchoring the Front's southern flank, launched a partially-successful reconnaissance-in-force on July 5, and then a series of resolute and somewhat effective counterattacks against the right flank of 2nd Panzer Group in the area of Rahachow and Zhlobin.

By July 10 the 154th had been reassigned to 63rd Rifle Corps, still in 21st Army. This Corps also contained the 61st and 167th Rifle Divisions. Given his Army's successes to date, on July 11 Timoshenko ordered Kuznetsov to "tie down the operations of the enemy and force him to fear the possibilities of our attacks" by dispatching "mobile detachments with sappers, antitank guns, and tank destroyer commands for operations in the direction of Zborovo, Chigirinka, Gorodishche, Zhlobin, Parichi and Bobruisk". These detachments were to destroy German tanks and disorganize the rear through "the destruction of transport, communications, radio transmitters, warehouses, and so forth, the destruction of supply routes, and the emplacement of mine traps." In addition, Timoshenko wanted Kuznetsov to "prepare an operation and keep units in readiness for a surprise seizure of Bobruisk and Parichi." At 0241 hours on July 13 Kuznetsov ordered his Army to expand its offensive by conducting an assault against 2nd Panzer Group's right wing in the Bykhaw region jointly with 4th Army. 63rd Corps was to attack along a front from Rahachow to Zhlobin, in cooperation with 66th Corps, beginning at 1700, to "destroy the enemy's Rogachev and Zhlobin grouping, capture Bobruisk, and, subsequently, prepare to attack toward the north."

The 154th was deployed on the east bank of the Dniepr roughly between Lebedevka and Zhlobin. The Corps as a whole, under command of Maj. Gen. L. G. Petrovskii, assaulted across the river and advanced 8-10km into the defenses of the advance elements of LIII Army Corps' 52nd and 255th Infantry Divisions. In doing so it retook Rahachow and Zhlobin and forced a German withdrawal to the west. Meanwhile, 66th Corps crossed the Dniepr between Rechytsa and Loyew and struck the defenses of the forward elements of 2nd Army's XII Army Corps and began exploiting northwestward toward Babruysk deep in the German rear. The 232nd Division made an impressive advance of 80km to the west. 63rd Corps was brought to a halt by the main forces of the two German divisions which threw up a credible defense line after some delay. The success of 63rd Corps was unique for the Red Army at this time, but it was also fleeting, as LIII Corps recaptured both Rahachow and Zhlobin within a week. The series of counterattacks by 21st Army were such a serious threat to 2nd Panzer Group's right flank that Army Group Center was forced to intervene with two divisions of the reserve XXXXIII Army Corps. The absence of these infantry divisions would soon be felt in the fighting around Smolensk.

During this operation one battalion of the 437th Rifle Regiment was under command of Cpt. Fyodor Alekseevich Batalov. Under his command the men of the battalion prevailed against stubborn opposition in the fighting for Rahachow and Zhlobin, capturing the railway depot of the latter place and several populated places. On August 9 he was made a Hero of the Soviet Union. Before he could actually receive his awards he was killed while breaking out of encirclement northeast of Gomel on August 17.

Western Front's operational summary issued at 2000 hours on July 16 stated, in part, that the 154th and 167th Divisions were attacking to the west, but no further information was available. At the same hour two days later the Front stated that 21st Army was attacking toward Babruysk against "four enemy divisions" and 63rd Corps was "defending its previous positions and repelling local enemy counterattacks, with 15 killed and 300 wounded and 6 tankettes destroyed." The report at 0800 on July 21 reported that the Corps was still holding on its previous line, fighting off repeated attacks by LIII Corps. Timoshenko issued orders to Kuznetsov that evening to attack again beginning on the morning of July 23. 63rd Corps specifically was to continue to push toward Babruysk, in cooperation with Gorodovikov's Cavalry Group, which had advanced into the salient created by 232nd Division. At this time the 154th was deployed between Krasnya Slabada and Malevichy. Meanwhile, the STAVKA created the new Central Front, with 4th, 13th, and 21st Armies under command of Kuznetsov, although the shattered 4th would immediately have its survivors incorporated into the 13th. 21st Army came under command of Lt. Gen. M. G. Yefremov. In a strength return prepared that day the 154th's divisional staff reported that the rifle regiments still had all their regimental 76mm guns and 120mm mortars, and the 571st Artillery Regiment had been fully equipped with 76mm cannons and 122mm howitzers, but the 580th Howitzer Regiment had only two 152mm pieces remaining.

The changes in command arrangements could not overcome the facts that by the last week in July Mogilev had been taken, 2nd Panzer Group was driving deep toward the east, and 21st Army was wearing itself out in an unequal battle with three army corps of 2nd Army now in the Babruysk, Rahachow, and Propoisk area, which were threatening the Army's forces west of the Dniepr with complete destruction. Yefremov immediately asked for permission to take 63rd Corps back to more defensible positions on the east bank, but this was refused.

=== Defense of Gomel ===
Through this entire period the 21st Army had its headquarters at Gomel. By the end of the first week of August the 2nd Panzer Group was placed to push southward across the Sozh River as part of a combined operation with 2nd Army into the Gomel and Rahachow regions. This was in response to Hitler's Directive No. 34 of July 30; anticipating this, Stalin had made command changes on August 7, sending Kuznetsov to the Crimea, putting Yefremov in command of Central Front, and making his former chief of staff, Lt. Gen. V. M. Gordov, the new commander of 21st Army. The German thrust began just after dawn on August 8 when the 3rd and 4th Panzer Divisions of XXIV Motorized Corps crossed the Sozh between Roslavl and Krychaw, accompanied by VII Army Corps on its left flank and 10th Motorized Division in the rear. This attack easily broke the thin defense on the right wing and center of 13th Army, leading to several days of heavy fighting in which the 13th was largely destroyed.

After dealing with the 13th by late on August 12 the XXIV Motorized reassembled east of Krychaw to continue its drive to the south. By now, 2nd Army had joined the offensive, pushing south across the Sozh toward Gomel with eight divisions of XII and XIII Army Corps. Army Group Center's commander, Field Marshal F. von Bock, had considered the capture of the city essential since the start of 21st Army's counterattacks the previous month. Despite finally being pulled back over the Dniepr the pincer move by 2nd Army and XXIV Panzer had encircled the bulk of 63rd and 67th Rifle Corps, a total of some six rifle divisions including the 154th, in a pocket on the east bank of the river northwest of Gomel. The trapped formations made repeated efforts to break out toward the city, forcing 2nd Army to commit all of XII and LIII Corps to contain and destroy them. Gordov had asked for permission from Stalin to allow 63rd Corps to withdraw to Gomel before being encircled, but this was denied. During August 17-18 the trapped men either surrendered or escaped in small groups, while General Petrovskii was killed near the village of Skepnia. General Fokanov organized a breakout toward Gomel that took the 134th Infantry Division by surprise, overrunning its headquarters at Gubich. Escaping the pocket were 236 men of the 510th Regiment, 100 of the 473rd, 203 of the 437th, plus 634 of other units and some 70 wounded, with a total of six artillery pieces, three tractors, and 176 horses. By the end of the month the division was withdrawn to the reserves of Bryansk Front to be rebuilt.

==== In Bryansk Front ====
Bryansk Front had been formed on August 14, under command of Lt. Gen. A. I. Yeryomenko. The STAVKA was planning a general counteroffensive by Western and Reserve Fronts to begin August 30-September 1, and Yeryomenko was ordered to support this with a general offensive of his own. The 154th was presently in no state to take part in this, as it had just 3,071 personnel on strength with 36 machine guns and a pair of 45mm antitank guns as its only artillery.

The division was one of five under direct Front command. In addition, Yeryomenko had four armies and two small operational groups, but most of his forces were in a shape as poor as that of the 154th, or worse. His most serious problem was trying to plug a gap over 20km wide between 21st Army and the rebuilding 13th Army. The STAVKA attempted to solve this by forming 40th Army on August 26 as part of Southwestern Front. In a report by Yeryomenko's headquarters at 2000 hours on September 6 the division was reported as "filling out in the Bryansk area," and 24 hours later was stated as preparing defenses west of the city. Despite the failure of the Front's counteroffensive the STAVKA was still pressing it forward on September 12, after Southwestern Front had been encircled east of Kyiv.

== Operation Typhoon ==
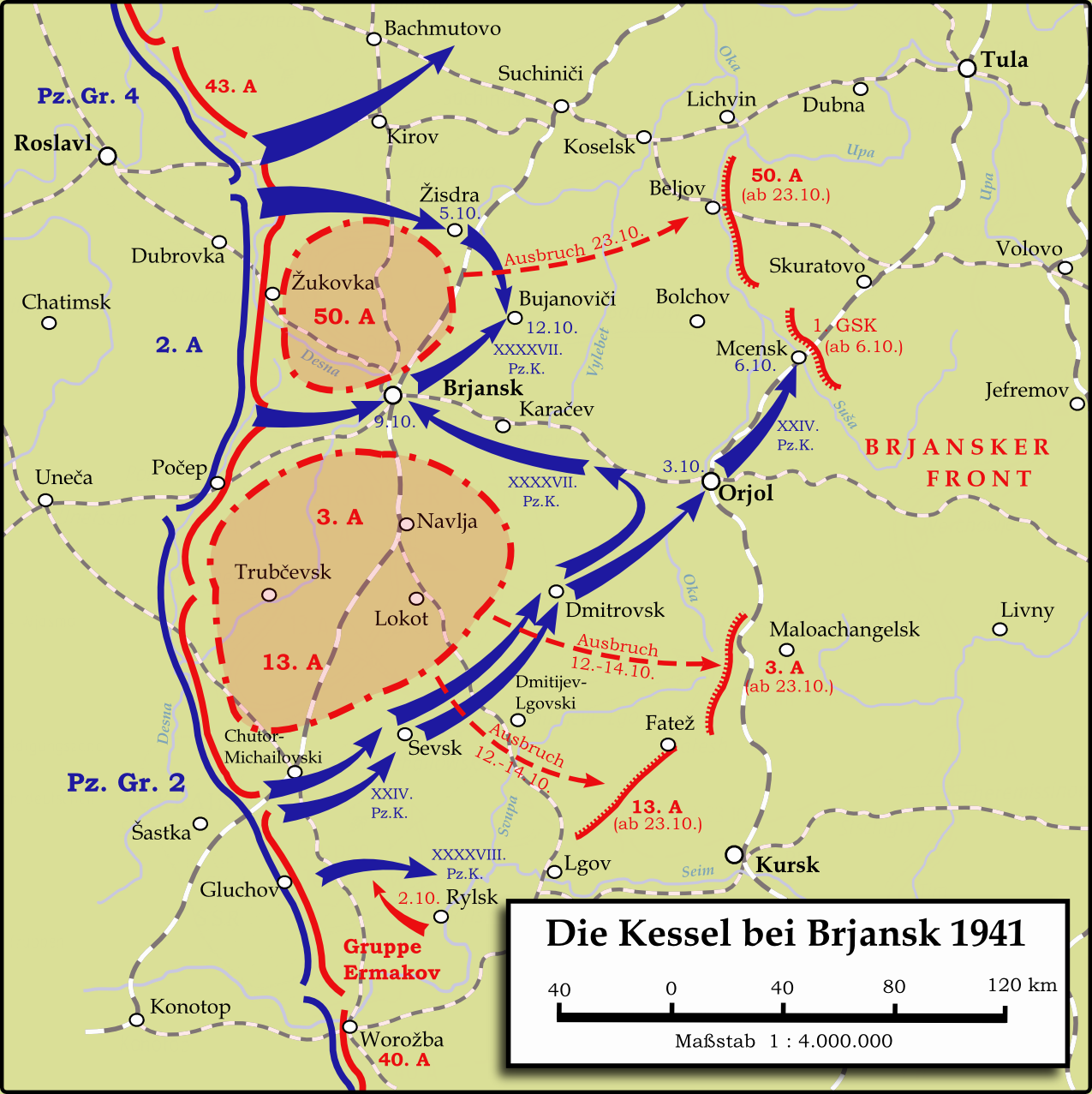
Battle of Bryansk (Brjansk). Note location of Tula in the northeast.

With the permission of Moscow, Yeryomenko finally directed the Front's forces to go over to the defensive at 1330 hours on September 28, in the face of clear signs of a new German offensive: "Within the next several days an enemy offensive toward Bryansk and toward Sevsk or L'gov must be expected." The Front reserves now consisted of the 154th and 287th Rifle and 108th Tank Divisions. Given their deployment the Front commander apparently believed that the main direction of the attack would be on Bryansk, with only the 42nd Tank Brigade positioned near Sevsk, near the Front's left wing. This was despite his intelligence officers establishing that the main German concentration was aimed at the boundary between his 50th Army and Reserve Front's 43rd Army.

The offensive began on this sector at dawn on September 30. XXXXVII Motorized Corps indeed struck at the Front boundary and quickly broke through the defense. Forces of German 2nd Army also penetrated between 50th and 3rd Armies on the route to Bryansk, while 2nd Panzer Group advanced on the route to Sevsk and Oryol. By the end of October 7 most of Bryansk Front was operationally encircled, and one regiment of the 154th was attempting to hold the western part of the city while several panzer units held the eastern part. Late that night, 50th Army, led by Maj. Gen. M. P. Petrov, began moving out to the northeast wherever gaps could be found in the German lines, aided by the fact that the panzers were scattered along a front over 100km long. The STAVKA was insisting that, rather than simply escape, the Front's forces "destroy the enemy Oryol grouping in the Oryol, Sevsk, Karachev area..." Given this, the Front's more desperate efforts to escape only began on October 9, by which time Yeryomenko only had command control over 3rd and 13th Armies.

By this time the 154th had become operationally attached to 50th Army. On the morning of October 9 the Army managed to break contact with the German forces and embark on a forced march of some 50km to the east before encountering significant resistance, which was followed by heavy fighting. The next day General Petrov was mortally wounded and soon replaced by Maj. Gen. A. N. Yermakov. During October 12 the Army faced a strong German grouping approaching from Oryol which was blocking its path to the east and southeast. The next day the operational summary of German 4th Army gave an assessment that the bulk of 50th Army had been destroyed. In fact, by the end of the day it had reached a line from Karachev to Podbuzhe and concentrated in the area Batagovo Station–Buyanovichi prior to forcing a crossing of the Resseta River in order to break out. The river was roughly 3m deep, in a boggy basin, without bridges. In the morning, General Fokanov had forced a crossing, but this was quickly contained. While the Army's artillery supported the bridgehead, the engineers worked hard to prepare bridging equipment. By the morning of October 14 this was ready, and under artillery and mortar fire the horse-drawn antitank and regimental artillery began to cross, which continued through the day. However, the tractor-drawn howitzers were unable to cross due to their weight and had to be destroyed, along with 20 Katyusha launchers which had expended all their ammunition. Yermakov led an outflanking effort which decided to outcome on the east bank, after which the weakened Army's forces pushed another 5-7km to the south, although progress to the southeast was still blocked.

German reports on October 17 again stated that 50th Army had been wiped out, but in fact it had changed direction to the northeast and slipped away, breaking through the cordon and advancing toward Belyov. By October 23 the remnants of seven rifle divisions, including the 154th, plus a tank brigade and several separate rifle and artillery regiments and other units, emerged near Belyov. Four pieces of the 571st Artillery Regiment were brought clear, and the division joined the defenses in the Belyov sector. Altogether, 50th Army, with its attached (such as the 154th) and supporting units, had lost nearly 90,000 personnel, but more than 12,000 had managed to escape. Meanwhile, the OKH listed the division as destroyed. While the divisional staff reported roughly 5,000 casualties, of which 2,500 were killed, missing-in-action, or taken prisoner, from October 1 to October 21, recent research indicates that, due to regular receipt of replacements through the period, the actual totals were some three times higher.

=== Defense of Tula ===
Tula was a major arsenal for the Soviet Union; many of its small arms and heavier weapons, plus ammunition, were produced in its factories. By October 25 the headquarters of 50th Army had been relocated there; after the fall of Mtsensk on October 6 it was an obvious objective for 2nd Panzer Group (now 2nd Panzer Army) on the road to Moscow from the south, but the drive was delayed by the need to mop up the pockets of Red Army troops to the rear, increasing resistance to the front, and deteriorating weather. In accordance with STAVKA Order No. 316, 50th Army, now with nine weak rifle divisions, a tank and a cavalry division, and remnants of the former 26th Army, fell back by October 30 to a line from Pavshino to Krapivna to Novo-Pokrovskoe to Verkhove. A rigid defense was to be formed on the axis Serpukhov–Tula with two divisions; Plavsk–Tula with three reinforced divisions, and not less than one division in Tula itself. In order to cover the city from the west, on October 24 the 194th Rifle Division, with some 4,500 men, was moved forward from the Belyov sector. This division would later prevent any German crossing of the Upa River.

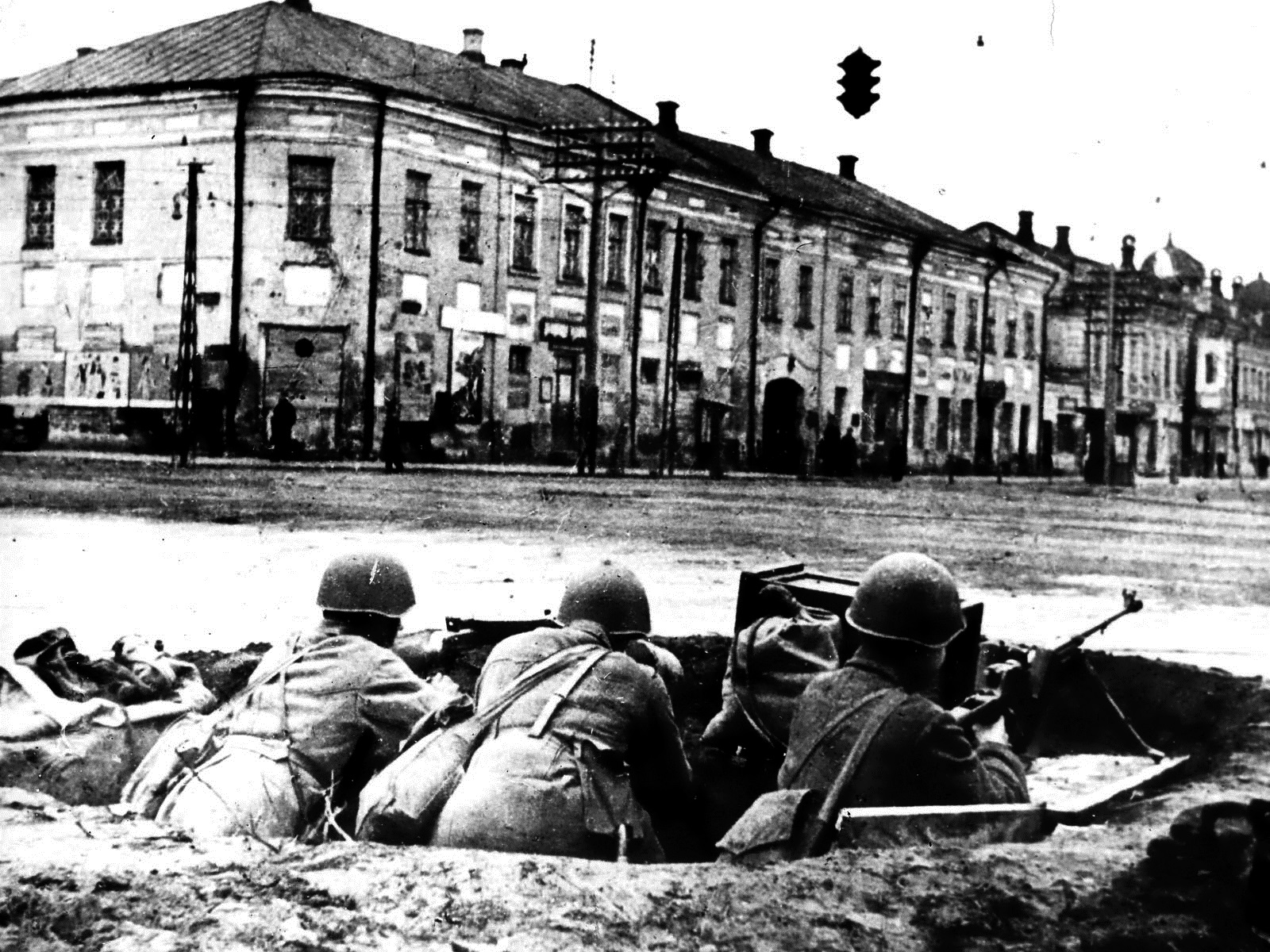
Defensive position in Tula, intersection of Sovetskaya and Kommunarov Streets

On October 29, General Yermakov created the Tula Combat Sector of six divisions, including the 154th, plus the 58th Reserve and 1005th Rifle Regiments. At this time General Fokanov had 2,000 men under command, making his one of the two largest in the Sector. However, the 571st Artillery had just two 122mm howitzers and no 76mm cannon, and only 34 percent of the riflemen and sappers actually had rifles. From October 30 to November 6 German forces attempted to capture Tula by means of a frontal blow from the south. Mixed groups of infantry and tanks began attacking on the morning of October 30 as leading elements of the 154th and 217th Rifle Divisions were arriving. The Tula Combat Sector had 4,400-4,500 men under command by the end of the day. These held their positions over the next two days, accounting for 22 tanks and an armored car in the fighting. 50th Army was being reinforced by the 32nd Tank Brigade and 413th Rifle Division during this time which allowed it to reestablish communications with 49th Army to its north. By November 5 all German efforts to take the city from the south had been frustrated, in part because their supply lines were vastly overstretched while arms and ammunition were being fed to 50th Army direct from the factories in their immediate rear. The reinforcements went over to the counterattack at dawn on November 7 but this developed slowly due to active German resistance and inexperience on the Soviet side and made no permanent gains. The next day the 217th and 154th beat off multiple attacks toward Kitaevka and in the area of the Oryol road.

Over the following week the German forces focused on again breaking communications between 49th and 50th Armies in an effort to encircle Tula. By November 22 the 2nd Panzer Army had captured Stalinogorsk and Tula was deeply outflanked but its defenses were continuing to hold and the German troops were severely worn down, still lacking clothing and equipment for winter warfare. On the same date Yefremov was relieved of his command and replaced by Lt. Gen. I. V. Boldin; the former would be arrested and court-martialed in late January, but later released. On December 2 Western Front gradually began going over to the counteroffensive.

== Moscow Counteroffensive ==
On the morning of December 8 the Western Front directed Boldin to throw the German forces back to the Upa. Its center divisions (154th, 290th and 217th), advancing on converging axes where to encircle them in the Kosaya Gora–Yasnaya Polyana area:

...d) the 154th Rifle Division, while holding the defensive line along the southern outskirts of Tula to the village of Novo-Tul'skii with two regiments, is to attack with one regiment in the direction of Krutoe and Prilepy (6 km southeast of Krutoe) and by the close of December 8 to occupy the line Krutoe-Krasnaya Upa (4 km east of Krutoe).

On December 10 the division was ordered to push its main forces the next day along the front Lomintsevo–Plekhanovo with the objective of taking both places by day's end. Together the 154th and 217th were to complete the destruction of the German grouping in the Shchekino area.

Following this the 154th developed its offensive to the southeast along the Upa with most of its forces. It encountered serious resistance from elements of the 112th and 296th Infantry Divisions plus the SS Regiment in the Bolshaya Yelovaya (3km southwest of Novo-Tulskii) and Petelino area. Both villages had been made into strongpoints and only fell after heavy fighting. The division attacked toward Lutovinovo on December 14 and reached a line from Krutoe to Vechernyaya Zarya to Sergievskoe. By this time the 413th on the division's left had taken Krutoe as well as Podosinki and Zamyatino. The division faced its hardest fighting along the Shat River from Prisady Station and to the east.

The second phase of the counteroffensive began on December 15 as the tattered divisions of 2nd Panzer Army continued to pull back to the south and southwest. 50th Army had already partially regrouped from its right flank to the west and northwest and was beginning to operate in conjunction with the 1st Guards Cavalry Corps. For two days the 154th attacked from the line Smirnoe–Panarino–Lomintsevo toward Shevelevka with two regiments, alongside the 217th, but on December 17 it was pulled out of the fighting line and concentrated in an area 5km south of Tula in order to prepare for the Army's new tasks. In part, the right flank and center were to cooperate with 49th Army in destroying the German grouping in and around Aleksin, prior to advancing on Kaluga.

=== Kaluga Offensive ===
This advance began on December 18, against increasing German resistance. Kaluga itself was garrisoned by remnants of the 131st and 137th Infantry Divisions, as well as several smaller units from the rear. Boldin had been directed to form a mobile group to advance on the city jointly with 49th Army. It was composed of the 437th and 473rd Rifle Regiments of the 154th, the 112th Tank Division, two batteries of Katyushas, and a flamethrower-incendiary company. In the morning it was reinforced with the 31st Cavalry Division, the Tula Worker's Regiment, the 131st Tank Battalion, and several smaller units, and was placed under the command of the Army's deputy commander, Maj. Gen. V. S. Popov. By order it had secretly concentrated by the end of the day in a wooded area 5-7km south and west of Zyabki, with the intention of conducting a surprise attack at dawn on December 20 to seize Kaluga from the south. It would have to cover a distance of more than 80km, piercing the defense to a depth of 40-45km, at a rate of more than 30km per day.

The units of the mobile group concentrated according to plan and overnight on December 17/18 moved along the route from Voskresenskoe to Dubna to Khanino. The regiments of the 154th, mounted in trucks, formed the first echelon, with 31st Cavalry and 112th Tanks in the second. This was made without contact with German forces. By 1400 hours on December 19 units of the group, having destroyed small groups of the 296th Infantry, reached a wooded area 3-5km north of Khanino and after a short rest pushed on toward Kaluga. By 2000, using tree cover, it crossed the line Mitinka–Alekseevskoe, aiming for the southern approaches to the city. By the end of December 20 it had reached a line 2km to its south and used the cover of darkness to prepare its strike.

The attack began on the morning of December 21 in three prongs: from Puchkovo; from Nekrasovo; and from the direction of Sekiotovo through Romodanovo. The 31st Cavalry made the first break-in from the southeast, followed by the 473rd Regiment and tanks from the 112th. Some tanks of the 20th Panzer Division had reinforced the garrison from the Mozhaysk area, and resistance was stubborn. The Soviet force became cut off and had to engage in street fighting while surrounded. The battle continued through the day without any communications with Boldin's headquarters. The next day the 258th Rifle Division on the Army's left flank advanced in order to envelop the city from the west, and early on December 24th the 340th Rifle Division was ordered to move along the Kaluga–Tarusa highway to do the same from the northeast. Meanwhile, the mobile group remained in heavy combat within the city itself. on December 22 some 500 German officers and men were claimed as killed and several aircraft shot down, while a further 1,900 casualties were tallied during December 23-24. The 437th Regiment broke through to the encircled units and also took the Puchkovo strongpoint 2km south of the city limits. Concurrently the 290th Rifle Division moved up to reinforce the 340th.

The second stage of the offensive began after December 25. The mobile group continued stubborn street fighting in the southern, central, and southeastern parts of the city, while German forces continued to hold in the north and west. During December 26 particularly heavy combat took place in the northeast and near the railway station, which was the core of the defense. On the same morning the 340th attacked from the east against units of the 31st and 131st Infantry. The next day the Western Front demanded that Boldin accelerate the mopping up of the city in order to develop the offensive in cooperation with 49th Army. By now Kaluga was being enveloped from the southeast and southwest. On the morning of December 30 the battle entered its decisive phase as the mobile group attacked and cleared the north and northwest and the approaches to the bridge over the Oka River. By 1000 hours the remaining defenders began to fall back to the northwest and west. 50th Army claimed to have inflicted over 7,000 casualties and had captured considerable amounts of equipment, but its own casualty figures are not known. The 154th was now pulled out of the city.

==== Yukhnov Offensive ====
By January 6, 1942, the 50th Army had run into a powerful German defense roughly from Argunovo to Domozhirovo to Annenka to Zheleztsovo, the latter of which had just been taken by the 413th Division. Boldin had formed a shock group consisting of the 154th (less the 437th Regiment) and 340th Rifle and 112th Tanks (soon redesignated as a brigade), covered by the 217th along the line Troskino–Yeremino; this group was ordered to attack Yukhnov. While the 340th was fighting for Ugarovka and Kudinovo the 154th and 112th were attempting to seize Shchelkanovo and Zubovo against strong resistance. Under pressure from Western Front, Boldin personally organized the battle along the main axis, particularly cooperation with the artillery; he also took all ski units under direct subordination. After taking its main objective the Army was to develop the offensive to the northwest. On January 11 the division was involved in heavy combat in the Derevyagino–Zubovo area.

Western Front stated on January 14, in regard to its left-flank armies, including the 50th:

1. The Kondrovo-Yukhnov enemy group, stubbornly resisting, is striving to hold the Warsaw highway and cover the Gzhatsk, Vyaz'ma and Roslavl' axes.
2. The immediate mission of the Western Front's left-wing armies is to complete the destruction of the Kondrovo-Yukhnov group and then, with a blow toward Vyaz'ma, to encircle and capture the enemy's Gzhatsk-Vyaz'ma group in conjunction with the armies of Kalinin Front and the Western Front's center armies.

A grouping of some 7-9 weak German divisions were defending in a triangular area bounded by Myatlevo, Polotnyanyi Zavod, and Yukhnov, covering the Warsaw highway and the Kaluga–Vyazma railroad despite the risk of being outflanked and encircled. However, the Soviet forces were themselves weak and the offensive developed slowly. On this date the shock group was fighting a firm defense along a line from Upryamovo to Shchelkanovo to Podpolevo; by this time the 112th had been reduced to five T-26 tanks and a single T-34 and was mostly fighting as infantry.

By January 18 the 154th had been transferred to a front from Sosino to Davydovo and during the day was fighting for Kuligi and Podpolevo against firm resistance. 50th Army by now was along a broken line more than 70km long, with its troops scattered along several axes. The next day the Front ordered Boldin to form another shock group to take Yukhnov via Podpolevo, but this did not include the division. German resistance continued to build and Boldin now decided to attempt to bypass the city from the south and southwest. On January 27 the 154th, now 1,000m northwest of Sosino, was redirected again toward Yukhnov. The German grouping, having been reinforced, stepped up its counterattacks. The battle for Yukhnov continued until March 5, when it was finally liberated.

== Kozelsk Offensive and redesignation ==
Shortly after, the division was transferred slightly north to join 49th Army. A month later it was moved to the Reserve of the Supreme High Command for rebuilding, where it was assigned to 58th Army, soon redesignated as 3rd Tank Army. The early tank armies typically contained a mix of armor, motorized, and rifle forces. The STAVKA expected that the anticipated German summer offensive would again be directed on Moscow, and the bulk of Red Army reserves were deployed accordingly.

In the event, the offensive was directed into the Caucasus steppe, and began on its north flank on June 28. As the 4th Panzer Army drove east toward Voronezh on July 4 the STAVKA ordered 3rd Tank Army, under command of Lt. Gen. P. L. Romanenko, to deploy from the Tula area to Yefremov, via Yelets, by July 6, which would place it 200km north of Voronezh. At this time Romanenko had under command, in addition to the 154th, the 12th Tank Corps, 15th Tank Corps, four separate tank brigades, a light artillery regiment, a Katyusha regiment, and an antiaircraft battalion.

Voronezh was captured on July 5, but fighting in the region continued for weeks. By August 19 3rd Tank Army had concentrated south of Kozelsk, in response to Operation Wirbelwind, which had begun on August 11. This offensive by 2nd Panzer Army had been designed to cut off the 10th and 16th Armies in their salient between Kirov and Sukhinichi in order to shorten the line and disrupt Western Front's offensive on Rzhev. It went ahead despite German 4th Army being unable to form a northern pincer due to lack of forces. In the event it accomplished little; while the forward regiments of three rifle divisions were surrounded the 9th and 19th Panzer Divisions ran out of steam after crossing the Zhizdra River.

Romanenko had been appointed as deputy commander of Western Front on August 15, which gave him command of 16th and 61st Armies in the area between Sukhinichi and Belyov as well as 3rd Tanks. He soon set to planning a counterblow against the east flank of the penetration over the Zhizdra. 61st Army would be spearheaded by a reinforced 3rd Tank Army (which now also had the 1st Guards Motorized and 264th Rifle Divisions under command) would attack from around Belyov, southeast of Kozelsk, and after crossing the Vytebet River push through to Ulyanovo in the German rear. Meanwhile, 16th Army with two tank corps and the 1st Guards Cavalry Corps, would attack from southwest of Kozelsk, eliminate the bridgehead over the Zhizdra, and join up with 61st Army to create an encirclement.

After assembling the 3rd Tank Army had a total of some 610 tanks, facing German XXXV Army and XXXXI Panzer Corps with roughly 200 tanks and assault guns. This assembly had taken place in just four days. Romanenko formed three shock groups, each consisting of a tank corps, a rifle division, and non-divisional artillery support. The attack began at 0615 hours on August 22, but immediately ran into difficulties due to lack of planning, cohesion, and experience, plus German air superiority. On the first day the rifle divisions, including the 154th, advanced as much as 5km, but the tanks became bogged down due to wooded and swampy terrain, minefields, and a well-planned antitank defense. Romanenko committed the 1st Guards Motorized on the second day, which managed to force the 25th Motorized Division back another 4km, but also came to a halt on August 25. After a regrouping the attack went in again on September 2-3, but with no greater success. In all, 3rd Tank Army lost up to 80 percent of its tanks in the course of the operation.

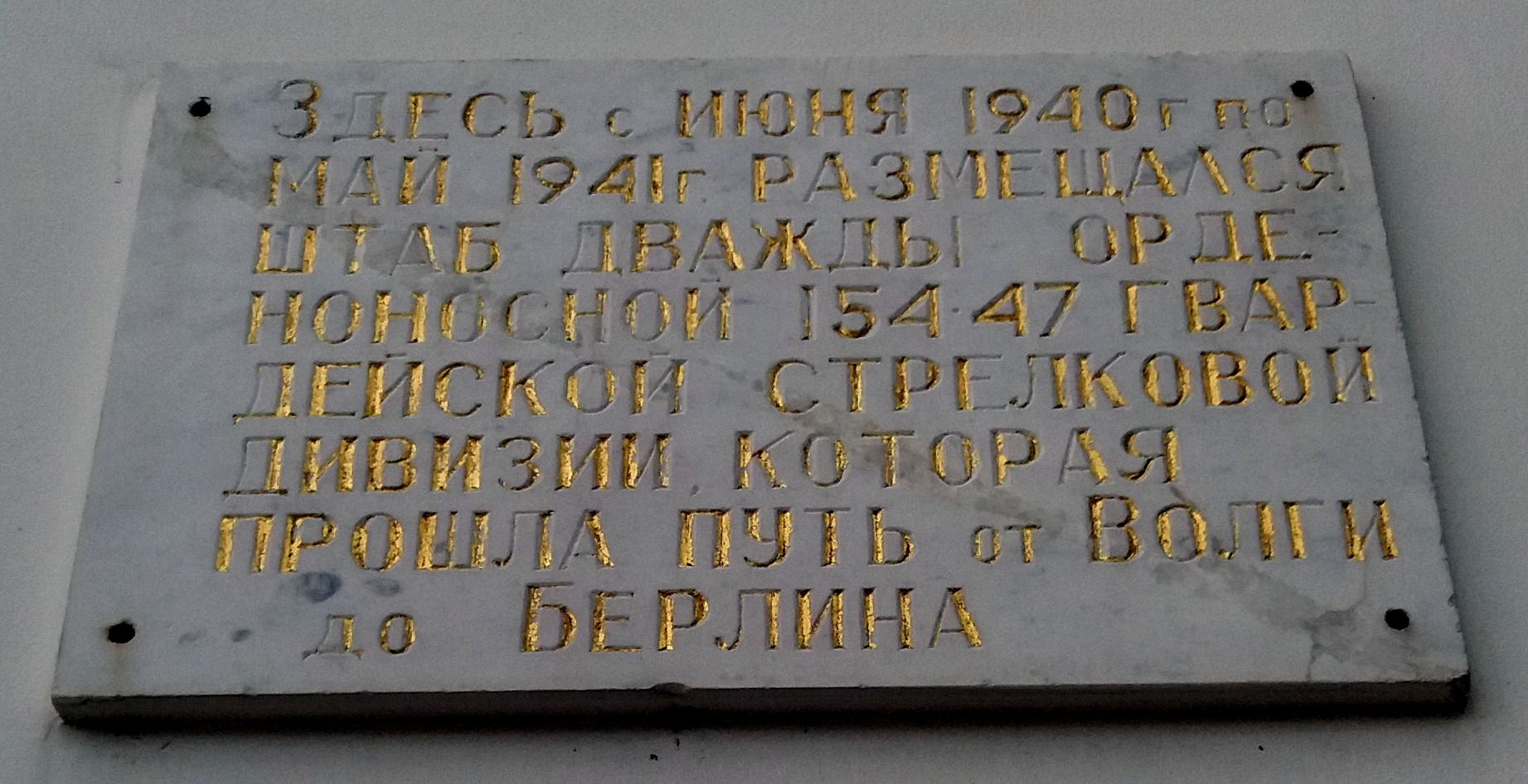
Memorial plaque to the 154th/47th Guards at Gymnasium No. 1, Ulyanovsk, where it first formed.

By the beginning of October the 154th had been transferred to 5th Tank Army in Bryansk Front. This Army was in the process of being transferred north of the Don River for eventual deployment in the planned counteroffensive near Stalingrad. General Fokanov left on October 10 to take the position of deputy commander of the Army, and was replaced by Col. Fyodor Afanasevich Ostashenko. Fokanov went on to lead the 29th Guards Rifle and 29th Rifle Corps into the postwar period, filled several administrative positions in Siberia during the late 1950s, and retired in May 1959 after two years as a military adviser in China. On October 20, in recognition of its local successes in the Kozelsk operation, as well as its earlier victory at Kaluga, the 154th was redesignated as the 47th Guards Rifle Division.

== 2nd Formation ==
A new 154th Rifle Division began forming on May 18 west of Rzhev in the Moscow Military District, based on the 82nd Naval Rifle Brigade and 130th Rifle Brigade.

=== 82nd Naval Rifle Brigade ===
The brigade was formed from October to December 1941 at Voroshilovsk in the North Caucasus Military District. Its cadre was made up of students from the naval schools and personnel of the Black Sea Fleet. After forming it was moved far to the north, arriving in the Arkhangelsk Military District early in the new year. It was still there at the beginning of May 1942, but disappears from the order of battle for that District a month later. One source states that it may have been used to form the 224th Rifle Division, but this was in fact formed from the 116th Rifle Brigade. Where ever the 82nd had been after May, Perechen No. 5 (see Bibliography) is clear that it formed part of the cadre of the new 154th a year later.

=== 130th Rifle Brigade ===
This unit was quickly formed from December 1941 to March 1942 in the Ural Military District. From there it was moved by train to join 30th Army in Kalinin Front the following month. It was reassigned to 39th Army of the same Front in August, and was under this command during Operation Mars in November. As the offensive ran down the brigade returned to 30th Army, and then back to the 39th in January 1943. In May it was moved to the Reserve of the High Command, and then disbanded to form the rest of the cadre of the 154th.

When the division finished forming its order of battle was very similar to that of its 1st formation:

- 437th Rifle Regiment
- 473rd Rifle Regiment
- 510th Rifle Regiment
- 571st Artillery Regiment
- 143rd Antitank Battalion
- 239th Reconnaissance Company
- 212th Sapper Battalion
- 292nd Signal Battalion (later 424th Signal Company)
- 183rd Medical/Sanitation Battalion
- 173rd Chemical Defense (Anti-gas) Platoon
- 200th Motor Transport Company
- 144th Field Bakery
- 249th Divisional Veterinary Hospital
- 1775th Field Postal Station
- 1732nd Field Office of the State Bank

Col. Konstantin Nikolaevich Nikulin was appointed to command on the day the division began forming. This officer had led the 82nd Brigade since December 1941. His deputy commander was Lt. Col. Anatolii Efimovich Polozov, who had been in command of the 130th Brigade since March. The division immediately came under command of Lt. Gen. E. P. Zhuravlev's 68th Army, and on July 12 this Army became part of the active forces when it joined Western Front. The 154th was part of 62nd Rifle Corps, along with the 153rd and 159th Rifle Divisions.

== Battle of Smolensk ==
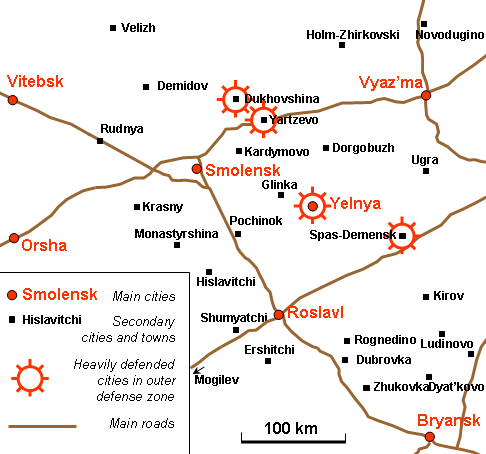
General layout of the Smolensk region during the offensive

On August 3 the 62nd Corps was transferred to 5th Army and began moving 5km to the north to a new jumping-off point. Operation Suvorov began on August 7 with a preliminary bombardment at 0440 hours and a ground assault at 0630. The commander of Western Front, Col. Gen. V. D. Sokolovskii, committed his 5th, 10th Guards, and 33rd Armies in the initial assault, while 68th Army was in second echelon. The attack quickly encountered heavy opposition and stalled. By early afternoon, Sokolovskii became concerned about the inability of most of his units to advance and decided to commit 68th Army's 81st Rifle Corps to reinforce the push by 10th Guards Army against XII Army Corps. This was a premature and foolish decision on a number of levels, crowding an already stalled front with even more troops and vehicles.

On the morning of August 8, Sokolovskii resumed his offensive at 0730 hours, but now he had three armies tangled up on the main axis of advance. After a 30-minute artillery preparation the Soviets resumed their attacks across a 10km-wide front. 81st Corps was inserted between the two engaged corps of 10th Guards, putting further pressure on the 268th Infantry Division. Reinforcements from 2nd Panzer Division were coming up from Yelnya in support. On August 9, during heavy fighting in the area of Pamyatka near the village of Mertischchevo, Colonel Nikulin was killed in action; he would eventually be buried in Vyazma. Now-Colonel Polozov took over the 154th.

By August 11 it became clear that XII Corps was running out of infantry and so late in the day the German forces began falling back toward the Yelnya–Spas-Demensk railway. By now Western Front had expended nearly all its artillery ammunition and was not able to immediately exploit the withdrawal. Sokolovskii was authorized to temporarily suspend Suvorov on August 21. On August 25 command of the division was transferred to Maj. Gen. Gavriil Dmitrievich Sokolov, who had previously led the 330th Rifle Division. By the end of the month 5th Army had just three divisions (154th, 207th, 312th) on strength.

In Sokolovskii's revised offensive plan the 5th and 31st Armies would conduct supporting operations to pierce the defense and liberate Dorogobuzh and Yartsevo. By now even the relatively fresh Red Army divisions like the 154th were well below authorized strength. As part of extensive maskirovka (deception) operations during August 23-27 several stratagems were used to deceive German intelligence, such as operating light tanks like the T-60 behind the front to simulate large-scale movements of armor. 5th Army joined the offensive on August 31, attacking the left flank of XII Corps with its full rifle strength supported by tanks and advancing 13km in a single day, reaching the Yelnya–Dorogobuzh road near Artyushino. This made it pointless to mount a defense of Dorogobuzh, and the 312th Division entered the empty town on September 1. The Army went on to attack the German defense along the Uzha River, but this was repelled by counterattacks.

The next phase of the offensive began on September 13, but 5th Army did not join in until two days later, when its three divisions went in against the 337th Infantry Division, which was attempting to hold a front of 26km width. Under these circumstances the Army's troops were able to make several penetrations and there were no tactical reserves available to plug them. The defenders had no choice but to pull back to the outskirts of Yartsevo to maintain a continuous line. 31st Army fought its way into the ruins and 18th Panzer Division pulled out to the west bank of the Vop River. With both Dukhovshchina and Yartsevo in Soviet hands the door to Smolensk was open. However, the 154th was now transferred to Kalinin Front, where 60th Rifle Corps was forming under direct Front command.

== Battles for Vitebsk ==
60th Corps had been recently created by the Front commander, Army Gen. A. I. Yeryomenko, as a reserve force containing the 119th, 154th, and 156th Rifle Divisions. He had been tasked with advancing on Vitebsk from the northeast, alongside a supporting operation toward Nevel, with the 60th Corps available to exploit success in either direction. The attack on Nevel by 3rd and 4th Shock Armies began early on the morning of October 6 and immediately achieved a success which was surprising to both sides, with the town itself falling to a coup de main by nightfall after an advance of some 25km.

=== Polotsk–Vitebsk Offensive ===
The Nevel offensive faltered in the face of enemy reserves and by October 10 halted just short of the Nevel–Haradok–Vitebsk railroad and highway, although local fighting continued until October 18. On November 2 a new offensive began in the direction of Vitebsk and Polotsk:

In an early morning fog on 2 November the Third and Fourth Shock Armies penetrated the Third Panzer Army left flank southwest of Nevel. They had paved the way during the five previous days with heavy attacks that drove a deep dent in the Third Panzer Army line. After the breakthrough, which opened a 10-mile-wide [16km] gap, Third Shock Army turned north behind Sixteenth Army's flank, and Fourth Shock Army turned southwest behind Third Panzer Army.
Army Group Center shifted a panzer division north from Ninth Army. With that division it was able to strengthen the Third Panzer Army flank below the breakthrough and deflect Fourth Shock Army southwestward away from the panzer army's rear.

4th Shock was led by 60th Corps (now with the 357th Rifle Division also under command) backed by the 143rd Tank Brigade. It struck the 87th Infantry Division and what remained of 2nd Luftwaffe Field Division (IX Army Corps) on a 10km-wide frontage 16km south of Nevel. 83rd Rifle Corps covered the 60th's left flank and Lt. Gen. A. P. Beloborodov's 2nd Guards Rifle Corps formed the Army's second echelon. After 60th Corps had penetrated the defenses some 10km deep the 2nd Guards Corps was committed on November 6, with the 154th and 156th Divisions being transferred to that command. Beloborodov wrote in his memoirs:

On November 6, the headquarters and the corps administration were relocated to the mouth of the salient. At this time the corps included four rifle divisions — the 47th, 154th, 156th, and 381st — and the 236th Tank Brigade... The mission was to expand the gap to the south. The 154th and 156th divisions were already advancing along the Nevel road on Ezerishche, Bychikha and Gorodok, and the 381st and 47th divisions... were to attack these towns from the west, from within the salient, and cooperate with other units of the 4th Shock Army, advancing from the east, to encircle the enemy.

In addition the Front's 43rd and 39th Armies were also attacking Vitebsk from the east, along the road from Smolensk.

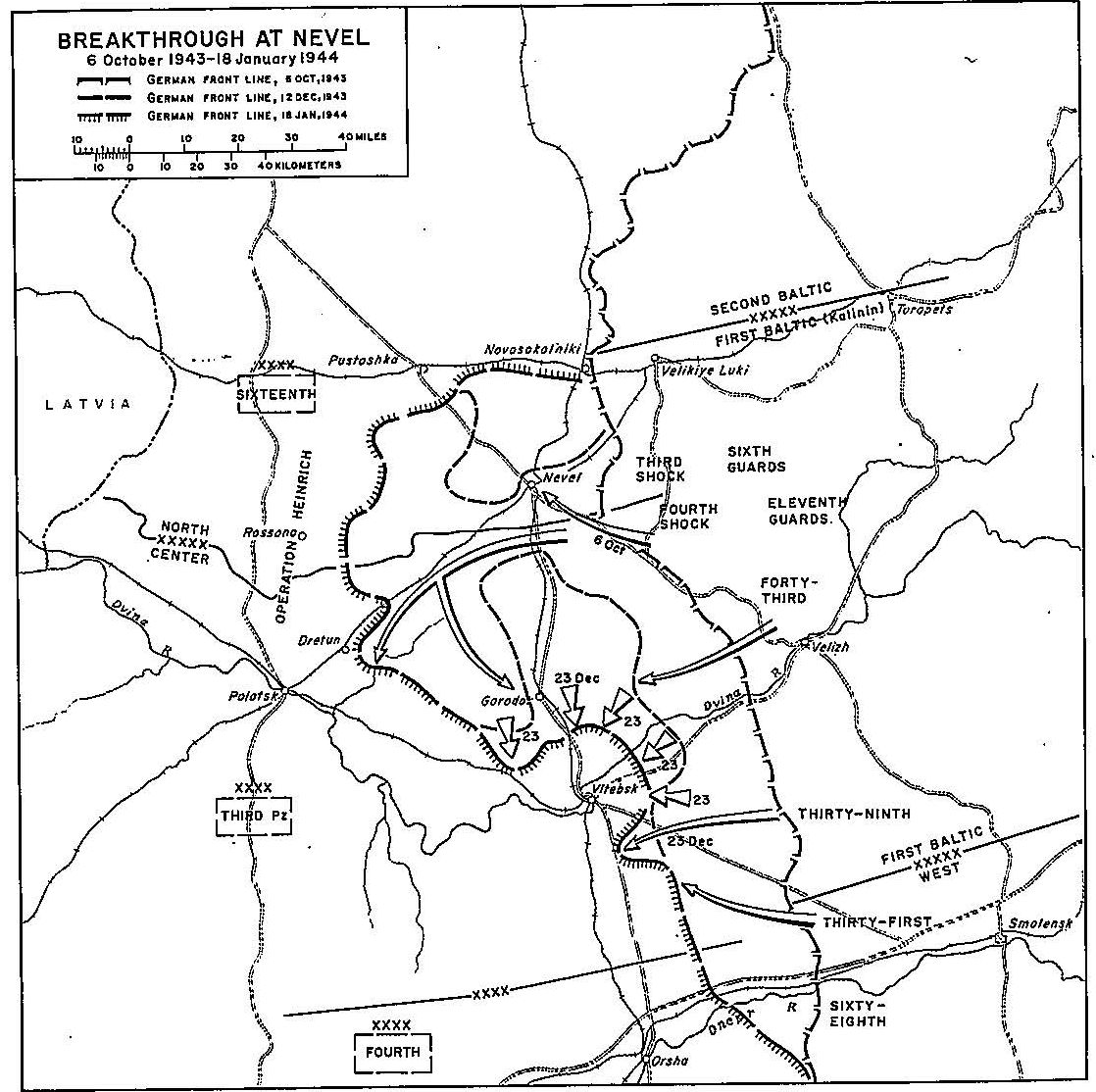
Battle of Nevel (October 1943 - January 1944). Note attacks of 4th Shock Army.

On November 8, the 20th Panzer and 87th Infantry Divisions attacked north into the breakthrough area and gained nearly 8km by the end of the day, then paused, awaiting a similar attack from Army Group North to seal off the Nevel salient. Beloborodov later wrote:

On the morning of 8 November, we received an alarming report from 156th Rifle Division, which read, "The enemy are advancing and attacking 417th Rifle Regiment with up to 50 tanks and infantry." ... I was forced to change 47th Rifle Division's combat mission. Its regiments counterattacked against the penetrating enemy directly from the march.

Overnight, the remaining rifle divisions of 2nd Guards Corps contained 20th Panzer along the road from Nevel to Haradok. 4th Shock now regrouped to send two groups deep into the German rear. One drove southwest toward Polotsk, while the second wheeled southward to take Haradok from the west; by November 11 the latter was just 22km away from this key stronghold. At this point deteriorating weather put a halt to the advance, but 20th Panzer was also forced to abandon its push toward Nevel.

Shortly after midnight on November 12 the STAVKA ordered 4th Shock to "break the German grip on Gorodok and Vitebsk" with additional mobile forces. Among other moves, after concentrating near Lake Svino, the reinforced 2nd Guards Corps was to attack on the morning of November 15 to defeat the German grouping south of Ezerishche. Prior to this, however, 4th Shock received the headquarters of 22nd Guards Rifle Corps, which now contained the 156th, 154th, and 117th Rifle Divisions, and was tasked with defending the south flank of the Nevel salient's "mouth" against any further German counterattacks. The offensive was renewed on November 16, and while on the evening of the 18th a small mobile column broke into Haradok it was soon destroyed by 20th Panzer. This led to a week of fighting west of the city, which finally came to a halt in part due to spring-like thaw conditions.

=== Vitebsk (Gorodok) Offensive ===
Army Gen. I. K. Bagramyan, the new commander of 1st Baltic Front, was ordered to go over to the defense on December 8 for regrouping and refitting in preparation for a new offensive in about a week's time. This would involve a combined operation by 4th Shock on the west side and 11th Guards Army on the east to pinch off the long salient north of Haradok at Bychikha Station, then push south to seize Haradok and, ideally, Vitebsk as well. This attack began on December 13. 4th Shock was operating on a wide front and would make its main attack with the five divisions of 2nd Guards Corps, backed by 60th Corps, over 150 tanks and self-propelled guns, and 3rd Guards Cavalry Corps. 22nd Guards Corps remained on its sector on the west side of the tip of the salient southwest of Lake Ordovo; the 156th was on the Army's left flank, tying in with 11th Guards and facing the 87th Infantry.

11th Guards Army hit the tip of the salient from three directions. Within two days it had penetrated deeply and was on the verge of trapping two German divisions in separate encirclements. 4th Shock also struck, following a 90-minute artillery preparation, focusing on the 129th Infantry Division, with mixed results. 22nd Guards Corps, including part of the 156th, began heavy attacks against the 87th on December 14 and advanced some 1.5km through heavily forested and swampy terrain, reaching the village of Skarinino. This put the 87th at risk of encirclement if 11th Guards maintained its advance. Gen. G.-H. Reinhardt, commander of 3rd Panzer Army, asked permission to withdraw from the salient, but this was refused. Despite the successes of the offensive in its first days, Bagramyan was impatient with 4th Shock, ordering it to "Develop the offensive resolutely day and night... cut the Nevel'-Vitebsk railroad in the Barkhi and Maleshenki sector at all costs." This urging was not actually necessary as early on December 15, despite counterattacks by 20th Panzer, the two Soviet armies had linked up, completely trapping the 87th and part of the 129th Infantry. Over the next 24 hours the encircled division struggled to escape the trap, with only limited success.

4th Shock and 11th Guards now turned to the tasks of reducing the pockets and turning to drive south on Haradok. Soviet sources claim a total of 20,000 German losses, while German sources admit just over 2,000. During December 17–18 an advance of 6–8km was made against withdrawing German forces, which had pulled back in good order some 20km to new defenses by the 19th. 4th Shock now regrouped south of Lake Kosho, 5–8km northwest of Haradok, leaving that objective to 11th Guards. Bagramyan directed that this be complete by December 23, after which the Army was to strike southward to cut the Vitebsk–Polotsk highway and rail line and then isolate and destroy the German Vitebsk grouping in cooperation with 43rd and 39th Armies attacking from the east.

This regrouping concentrated the 83rd Rifle and 2nd Guards Rifle Corps on the Army's left (west) wing with most of the mobile forces. 22nd Guards Corps (now the 154th, 156th, and 51st Rifle Divisions) was deployed on a line that stretched to the west from Bandury, roughly in the Army's center. The STAVKA was confident that it had sufficient forces to achieve its objective of taking Vitebsk by January 1, 1944. When the offensive began on December 24 the 11th Guards made only minimal gains south of Haradok, but 83rd and 2nd Guards Corps broke through the defenses at the boundary of IX Army Corps and LIII Army Corps, penetrating up to 4km and reaching the Sirotino–Vitebsk road to the east and west of Grabnitsa. The Army expanded this penetration the next day when the 154th and 156th Divisions reached the northern outskirts of Sirotino and the defenses of 252nd Infantry Division. At the same time the 2nd Guards Corps punched a hole in the defenses near Grabnitsa, forcing 3rd Panzer Army to attempt to fill the gap with the 5th Jäger Division, while also pulling most of LIII Corps back to new defenses.

December 26 saw the start of a fierce meeting engagement on and south of the Sirotino–Vitebsk road. 2nd Guards Corps was able to cut the rail line with tank and cavalry support before running into counterattacks from 5th Jäger, which over the next two days cleared the line. The 154th some way to the west reached a position east of the village of Mazurino northwest of Sirotino. 5th Jäger and 6th Luftwaffe Field Division managed to retake about half of 4th Shock's salient south of the Sirotino–Vitebsk road by December 31, while 11th Guards Army failed to make any progress. Bagramyan persisted with his attacks into the first few days of 1944, particularly with 83rd, 2nd Guards, and 3rd Guards Cavalry Corps, without success. By January 5 the fighting sputtered to a halt.

Under orders from the STAVKA Bagramyan renewed the offensive on January 6 with 4th Shock and 11th Guards attacking from Mashkina southwest to Gorbachi on the Sirotino–Vitebsk road then northwest to Mazurino. Overall this sector formed a broad salient into 3rd Panzer's defenses west-northwest of Vitebsk. The commander of 4th Shock, Lt. Gen. P. F. Malyshev, again formed the 83rd and 2nd Guards Corps as his shock group to make the Army's main attack from the south tip of the salient southwest of Lake Zaronovskoe. 22nd Guards Corps was deployed in the area of Sirotino on the shock group's right flank and was to conduct local attacks against 252nd Infantry to prevent it from transferring reserves to the intended breakthrough sector. By this time all of the Army's divisions had 4,500-5,000 personnel and were significantly under strength. The attack began with a short, powerful artillery preparation but was met with determined resistance. The shock group gained roughly 1–2km by January 14, and 22nd Guards Corps made no progress at all, with the 154th stuck in its previous positions. However, the STAVKA insisted that Bagramyan persist in this effort, which he did until January 24 with no better result.

==== Vitebsk Offensive ====
The final attempt to encircle and destroy the German Vitebsk grouping began on February 2. 1st Baltic Front was to concentrate its forces on 4th Shock's left wing and 11th Guards' right wing, assisted by reinforcements from 43rd Army. Bagramyan wrote: "I have decided to employ 20 understrength rifle divisions, two tank corps, three tank brigades, and almost all of the front's artillery and aviation in a penetration operation." 22nd Guards Corps was not part of the shock group and was again to pin down the 5th Jäger and 252nd Infantry, joining the assault when feasible. The offensive began with an extensive artillery preparation and in two days of heavy fighting the shock group was able to gain 3.5km on a 9km-wide front. With the support of 5th Tank Corps this was deepened by 4km over the next two days, before encountering 20th Panzer which stabilized the situation. By the end of February 5 the shock group had broken the forward defense of LIII Corps, but the deeper defense was firming up. On February 9 General Sokolov left the division, being replaced by Col. Aleksandr Nikolaevich Gordeev until February 20, and then by Col. Dmitrii Dmitrievich Nabatov until March 18 when he returned.

The attacks ground on until the morning of February 15 when one last lunge reached the northern approaches to Litovshchina. By now 5th Tanks was down to 10-20 serviceable tanks and the rifle divisions were under 3,000 personnel each. The offensive was officially suspended the next day, and would not resume during the upcoming spring thaw. Later in the month the 22nd Guards Corps, now with just the 154th and 156th Divisions, was reassigned to 43rd Army, remaining in 1st Baltic Front.

== Operation Bagration ==
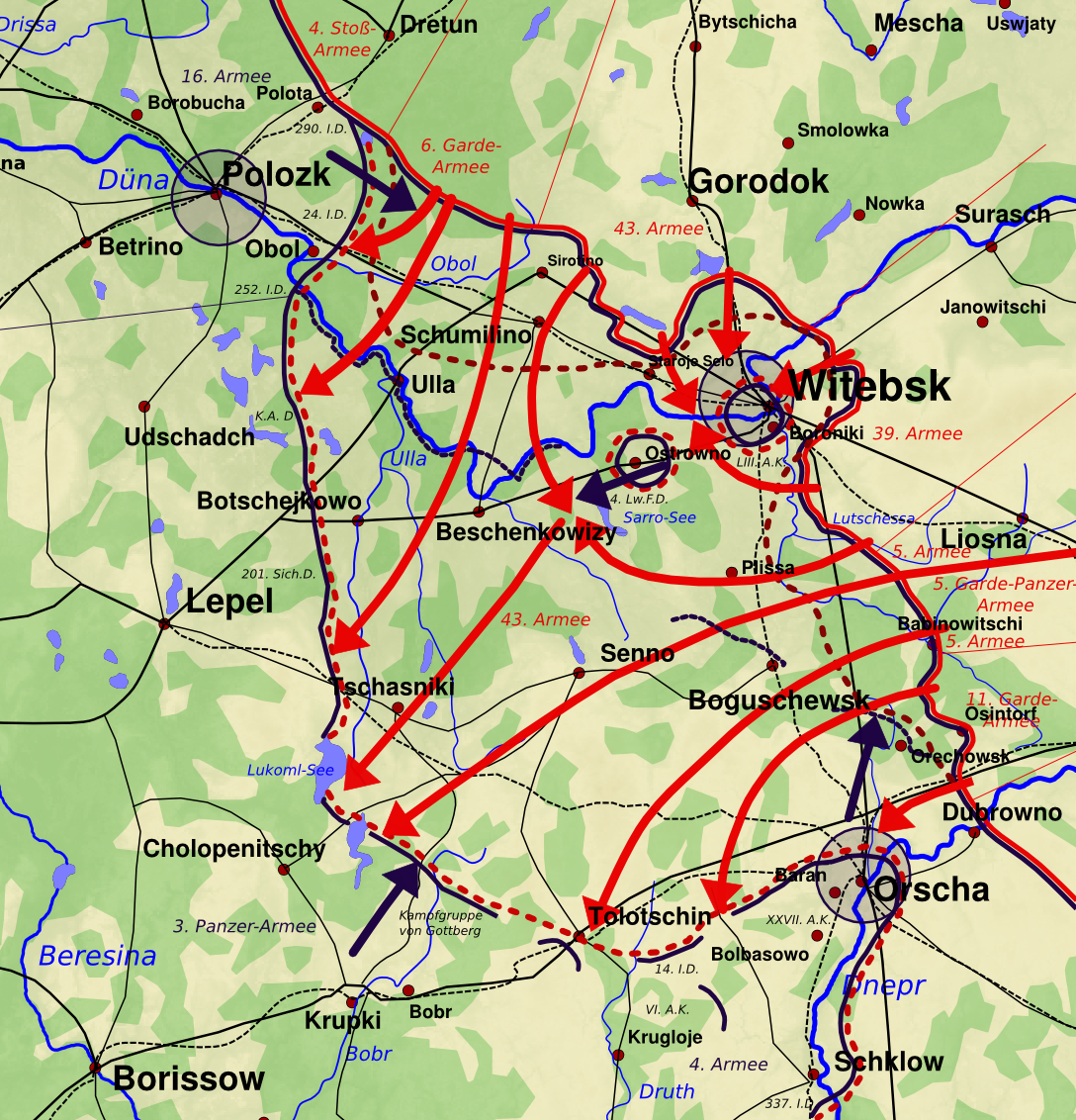
Vitebsk-Orsha Offensive. Note position of 6th Guards Army.

As of the beginning of June the division was still under these commands, but just prior to the summer offensive it was transferred to 6th Guards Army, which was also in 1st Baltic Front. Here it came under direct Army command. On June 6 General Sokolov was hospitalized; he would not hold any further combat commands and retired in October 1947. Col. Leonid Timofeevich Sochilov, who had briefly led the 145th Rifle Division, took over the 154th.

Bagramyan's headquarters began preparing for the offensive on May 29. It faced, in whole or part, 11 German divisions or battlegroups (with four in reserve), divided between Army Group North's 16th Army and Army Group Center's 3rd Panzer Army. The Front would attack on two main axes: toward Vitebsk and toward Polotsk. Its commander concluded that:

... an offensive directly along the Polotsk and Vitebsk axes may encounter strong enemy resistance... The greatest results can be achieved by an offensive along a broad front... with the main attack landing between the boundary of the enemy's Sixteenth and Third Panzer armies in the general direction of Lovzha and Beshenkovichi, bypassing the enemy's group of forces from the west.

The Front had 24 rifle divisions and one rifle brigade, a tank corps, and substantial reinforcements. It was almost entirely deployed in a single echelon, with just the 154th, concentrated at Kozyany, and the 1st Tank Corps in reserve.

=== Vitebsk-Polotsk Offensive ===
The offensive began on June 22. The presence of 6th Guards Army came as a surprise to German intelligence as it had only just arrived on a 30km front vacated by 43rd Army after a 110km approach march over three nights. Following a very heavy artillery barrage and air attacks, the assault corps of 43rd and 6th Guards passed through both the first and second German defense lines and reached the Obol River. By evening this obstacle had been crossed and Sirotino was finally taken after an advance of 7km on a 12km-wide front. The perimeter around Vitebsk remained fairly quiet, and while Field Marshal E. Busch, commander of Army Group Center, could see the danger facing LIII Corps in and around the city, Hitler would not agree to a withdrawal.

On the second day the 22nd Guards and 103rd Rifle Corps struck the 252nd Infantry Division again and it was soon in danger of losing contact with 16th Army to the north. By day's end a further advance of 18km had been made and elements of the two Corps were just 2km short of the Dvina River. 1st Tank Corps had been ordered to enter the gap in the German line and head for Beshankovichy but was delayed by heavy rain and poor roads. Late in the afternoon the commander of IX Corps ordered his troops to give up the second defensive line and fall back on the third line 15km to the rear. 103rd and 22nd Guards struggled to remain in contact. At 0600 hours on June 24 the tanks pushed through the gap at Shumilina north of the 252nd despite the mud and reached the Dvina south of Ulla at 1100, where they found a bridge largely intact which they used to force a crossing. During the evening the 6th Guards advanced another 3km west through swampy terrain with 22nd Guards on the right and the 103rd and 23rd Guards on the left, reaching, but failing to cross, the Dvina. At 2230 Hitler belatedly agreed to withdraw IX Corps to the second line, which it had already passed; the Corps was close to the point of collapse.

June 25 saw the 103rd Corps make a crossing at Ulla, and at about this time the 154th came under this Corps, which was commanded by Maj. Gen. I. F. Fedyunkin. The remnants of IX Corps were urgently preparing a defense line about 35km southeast of Polotsk before they were overrun. The next morning saw 6th Guards and 43rd Armies crossing the Dvina at many points; in all 6th Guards had seven divisions across and pushing westward. By June 28 the gap between IX Corps and 16th Army was 12km wide, with no hope of being closed and 6th Guards pressing hard. IX Corps withdrew again overnight on June 28/29 without much interference, but was soon forced to retreat again under pressure from 1st Tanks. It was by now a collection of remnants of three divisions in a small semicircle about 75km southwest of Polotsk. 6th Guards Army now set its sights on taking that city. On the morning of June 30 103rd Corps went back on the offensive and the 154th mopped up the remainder of German forces on the east bank of the Dvina to the south of Goryany. Given the circumstances, the Army command considered the 22nd Guards and 23rd Guards Corps sufficient to secure Polotsk, and Fedyunkin was ordered to begin a forced march toward Dzisna to begin a drive on the Daugavpils axis. Dzisna had fallen to 1st Tanks the same day. 103rd Corps was to reach the line Drissa–Ponki by the end of July 2.

== Baltic Offensives ==
Polotsk was cleared by 0400 hours on July 4 and four days later the 154th was in the city, seeking to cross to the south bank. On July 11, Colonel Sochilov left the division to take deputy command of the 92nd Rifle Corps and was replaced by Col. Aleksei Prokofevich Moskalenko. This officer had served as commander of the 32nd Cavalry Division earlier in the war before taking the position of Kalinin Front's inspector of cavalry. He would be promoted to the rank of major general on November 2.

By the beginning of August the division had reached Daugavpils, but over the next two weeks a rejuvenated 3rd Panzer Army gathered forces for a counteroffensive as the 103rd Corps, transferred to 43rd Army, took up positions north of Šiauliai. By the beginning of September this threat had been thwarted and the Corps had returned to 6th Guards Army, but was still located near Šiauliai, where it remained into early October, as the campaign to finally capture Riga went on. On November 29 the STAVKA issued an order for the movement and resubordination of 2nd Guards Army, which had been fighting in the Crimea until mid-May, then transferred north to enter the Baltic battles well after the offensive had begun. The 154th had been returned to 22nd Guards Corps, which was now transferred to 2nd Guards, which was in turn transferred to 3rd Belorussian Front. All this was to be completed by the morning of December 13, with the Army concentrated in the Jurbarkas area. By the beginning of January the 154th had returned to 60th Rifle Corps, in the same Army and Front. It would remain under these commands into the postwar.

== East Prussian Offensives ==
60th Corps now contained the 154th, 251st, and 334th Rifle Divisions. On January 10, 1945, General Moskalenko left the division and was hospitalized due to illness, but the following month he took command of the 251st. Col. Nikolai Lvovich Volkov took command of the 154th, which he would lead into peacetime. When the East Prussian offensive was launched on January 13, 60th Corps was assigned to defend along a broad front to the north of Goldap while the remainder of 2nd Guards Army followed 28th Army's breakthrough of the German lines; the 154th and its Corps followed in second echelon. On January 22 the Army fought off powerful counterattacks on its right flank as the Front's main forces battled to break the main German defensive line, so the 154th and 251st could only make marginal advances. Over the following day the Front's forces arrived along the Deime River and a crossing was forced. On February 19 the 473rd Rifle Regiment would be awarded the Order of Kutuzov, 3rd Degree, for its part in forcing crossings of the Pregel and Deime rivers and the capture of several East Prussian towns, including the stronghold of Labiau.

On March 1 the division was fighting along the Tiefen See, some 30km east of Braniewo, against a group of German-held bunkers and other strongpoints. In order to provide support to the riflemen, Sen. Sgt. Nikolai Gerasimovich Yezhov, in command of a gun of the 571st Artillery Regiment, ordered his crew to manhandle it to a position to open direct, rapid fire. This succeeded in eliminating a strongpoint with five machine guns and about 20 officers and men. This was followed by a series of counterattacks, and Yezhov continued to lead the firing; despite being seriously wounded in the leg on the fourth attack he took over from his wounded gun layer. During the sixth attack he was killed by shell fragments. He was buried in Braniewo and on June 29 he would be made a Hero of the Soviet Union.

=== Battle of Königsberg ===
During the first half of March the 2nd Guards Army was pulled back into the Front's second echelon. In the second half of March, in the lead-up to the assault on Königsberg, 60th Corps advanced along a route from Preussisch Eylau to Domnau, Tapiau, and Granz, as a preliminary to the elimination of 4th Army in the Heiligenbeil pocket, which was completed on March 29. On April 26 the 154th would be awarded the Order of Suvorov, 2nd Degree, for its role in this victory. During the assault on Königsberg on April 7, the division assisted in forcing the Tierenberger River and reached the area north of Norgau. Once the city fell, the 154th took part in the clearing of the Samland Peninsula beginning on April 13 as part of the Zemland Group of Forces.

== Postwar ==
The division's final awards came on May 28, when the 437th Rifle Regiment received the Order of the Red Banner, and the 510th Regiment was given the Order of Kutuzov, 3rd Degree, both for their roles in the clearing of Pillau. In the following months 60th Corps was moved to the Smolensk Military District, but the 154th remained in East Prussia, where it was disbanded in February, 1946.
