= 330th Rifle Division =

330th Rifle Division (August 1941 – June 1945)
- Wartime photo of Maj. Gen. G. D. Sokolov
- Active: 1941–1945
- Country: Soviet Union
- Branch: Red Army
- Type: Infantry
- Size: Division
- Engagements: Battle of Moscow; Defense of Tula; Battle of Smolensk (1943); Operation Bagration; Vistula-Oder Offensive; Berlin Strategic Offensive Operation
- Decorations: Order of the Red Banner; Order of Suvorov 2nd degree Order of Kutuzov 2nd degree
- Battle honours: Mogilyov

Commanders
- Notable commanders: Maj. Gen. Gavriil Dmitrievich Sokolov; Maj. Gen. Vladimir Aleksandrovich Gusev

The 330th Rifle Division was formed as an infantry division of the Red Army late in the summer of 1941, as part of the massive buildup of new Soviet fighting formations at that time. It took part in the defense of Tula in 10th Army soon after reaching the front, and remained in that army for a remarkably long time, until April 1944. It fought in the offensive push into German-occupied western Russia through 1943, then in the destruction of Army Group Center in the summer of 1944, distinguishing itself in the liberation of Mogilyov in June. In 1945 the men and women of the 330th took part in the Vistula-Oder Offensive through Poland and into Pomerania, and then finally in the fighting north of Berlin, ending the war with high distinction, but being disbanded soon after.

== Formation ==
The 330th Rifle Division began forming in August 1941, at Tula in the Moscow Military District. It was based on the first wartime shtat (table of organization and equipment) for Soviet rifle divisions. Its first commander, Maj. Andrei Petrovich Voevodin, was appointed on September 5, but this was a temporary arrangement, and he was replaced by Col. Gavriil Dmitrievich Sokolov ten days later. Its basic order of battle was as follows:

- 1109th Rifle Regiment
- 1111th Rifle Regiment
- 1113th Rifle Regiment
- 890th Artillery Regiment

The division was another of the partially-formed and barely trained divisions assigned to the 10th (Reserve) Army in the Reserve of the Supreme High Command in October. At this time it was noted as being made up of 90 percent Russian nationals. 10th Army was deployed in the last week of November west of the Oka River, downstream from Kashira, to defend both Kolomna and Ryazan from the German 2nd Panzer Army.

== Battle of Moscow ==
The 330th went into action in December, attacking south of Tula in the Western Front. As of December 6 it was fighting to bypass the town of Mikhaylov from the north. By the end of December 7 Mikhailov had been liberated, in conjunction with the 323rd and 328th Rifle Divisions. On the morning of December 11 the division was one of the five divisions in the first echelon of the Army to be ordered to reach the line Uzlovaya station - Bogoroditsk - Kuzovka by the end of the day. By that time the 330th was fighting enemy detachments covering their withdrawal along the line Khlopovo - Rogachevka, and preparing a further attack to the south. This effort threw back the enemy, and on the 13th the division had occupied the glen southeast of Urvanki. From December 7 - 13 the division covered an average of nine km per day, a higher rate than any other in 10th Army.

The division remained in 10th Army throughout 1942 and 1943. After the spring of 1942 this army was on a relatively quiet sector of the front, where the division could rebuild and remedy its early deficiencies in equipment and training. Colonel Sokolov remained in command until October 5, when he handed over his position to Col. Yuri Mikhailovich Prokovev for most of the month. Sokolov took command again on November 2, and on February 14, 1943, he was promoted to the rank of Major General. On February 25, Western Front was ordered to prepare an offensive by 10th and 50th Army in the direction of Roslavl and Yelnya; this order was modified two days later. In the event it was never carried out, due to developments to the south.

== Battles for Smolensk and Belorussia ==
On August 4, General Sokolov handed his command to Col. Ivan Ivanovich Oborin. The 330th took part in Operation Suvorov, the grinding offensive westward towards Smolensk, which began on August 7, but did not involve 10th Army until three days later. On August 10 the commander of Western Front, Col. Gen. V. D. Sokolovsky, ordered the Army to attack north-west out of its salient around Kirov against the LVI Panzer Corps. The command of the German 4th Army was not expecting an attack from this direction, and three rifle divisions, the 247th, 290th and 330th were able to punch through the left flank of the 321st Infantry Division and advance 5 km on the first day. This was the first breakthrough achieved in the offensive, but 10th Army did not have a mobile group to exploit it. 9th Panzer Division was ordered to intervene, but before it could arrive the Soviet divisions began to roll up the 131st Infantry Division, and the right flank of 4th Army began falling back to secondary positions.

Later that month the division was assigned to 38th Rifle Corps. Colonel Oborin was replaced by Col. Vladimir Aleksandrovich Gusev on September 27. Gusev would command the division for the duration of the war, and would be promoted to the rank of Major General on September 13, 1944.

In early October, as Western Front made its first attempt to liberate Orsha, 10th Army was on the Front's left flank, and 38th Corps deployed into positions in the bend of the Pronia River southeast of Chausy. In November the division was withdrawn into the Reserve of the Supreme High Command for rebuilding. In December it returned to the line, now in 70th Rifle Corps. By the beginning of January 1944, that Corps had advanced well past the Pronia, outflanking Chausy well to the south and west. To the south of 10th Army, the 3rd and 50th Armies were making substantial gains in the direction of Bykhov. Therefore, Western Front ordered 10th Army to conduct a two-pronged attack against the defenses of German XII Army Corps north and south of Chausy. The attack on the north flank began on January 3, but only gained 1.5 - 2km in two days fighting. In the south, 38th Rifle Corps was in first echelon, and as it also made only minor gains, 70th Corps in second echelon was not committed, and the entire operation was shut down on January 8.

By late March, 10th Army had been transferred to 1st Belorussian Front, and 70th Corps was now located northeast of Chausy. Gen. K.K. Rokossovsky ordered a further attempt to advance and take Chausy by 10th and 50th Armies to begin on March 25. In the event the 330th, attacking alongside the 290th Rifle Division north of the city, failed to make any appreciable progress.

In early April, 10th Army was transferred back to Western Front, and then withdrawn to the Reserve of the Supreme High Command. Later that month the Front was split into 2nd and 3rd Belorussian Fronts. 10th Army was disbanded, with its headquarters taking control of 2nd Belorussian Front and its divisions being assigned to 49th Army in that same Front. The 340th would remain in this Front for the duration of the war.

At the beginning of June, the 330th was still in 70th Rifle Corps, but prior to the start of Operation Bagration on June 23, the division had been transferred to 62nd Rifle Corps in the same army. On June 25 the 330th took part in the long-delayed liberation of Chausy, on the way to Mogilyov. After intense fighting by elements of both the 49th and 50th Armies, Mogilyov was taken on June 28, and the division was awarded the name of the city as an honorific:

"MOGILYOV" - The following formations and units distinguished themselves in battle as they crossed the Dnieper to claim mastery of the cities of Mogilyov, Shklov and Bykhov... The name Mogilyov is awarded to the 64th Rifle Division, the 290th Rifle Division, and the 330th Rifle Division (Colonel Gusev, Vladimir Aleksandrovich)...

On July 10 the division was awarded the Order of the Red Banner in recognition of its role in the liberation of those same towns and cities.

== Advance ==
A few days later the division was transferred again, this time to 121st Rifle Corps in 50th Army. The 330th would remain in this army until January 1945, serving also in 69th and 81st Rifle Corps. As 2nd Belorussian Front advanced into western Poland and eastern Germany, the division was a "fire brigade", serving in the Front reserves, 70th Army, and also back in 70th Corps of 49th Army. It ended the war under these commands at Gransee, due north of Berlin.

== Postwar ==
The men and women of the 330th ended the war with the official title of 330th Rifle, Mogilyov, Order of the Red Banner Division. (Russian: 330-я стрелковая Могилёвская Краснознамённая дивизия.) On June 4 the division was also awarded the Order of Suvorov for its part in the fighting for Stettin, Penkun, Gartz, Krzekov and Schwedt in what is now northeast Germany/northwest Poland; it would also win the Order of Kutuzov before its disbandment. According to STAVKA Order No. 11095 of May 29, 1945, part 6, the 330th is listed as one of the rifle divisions to be "disbanded in place". It was disbanded in Germany in accordance with the directive during the summer of 1945.
