= Zemland Group of Forces =

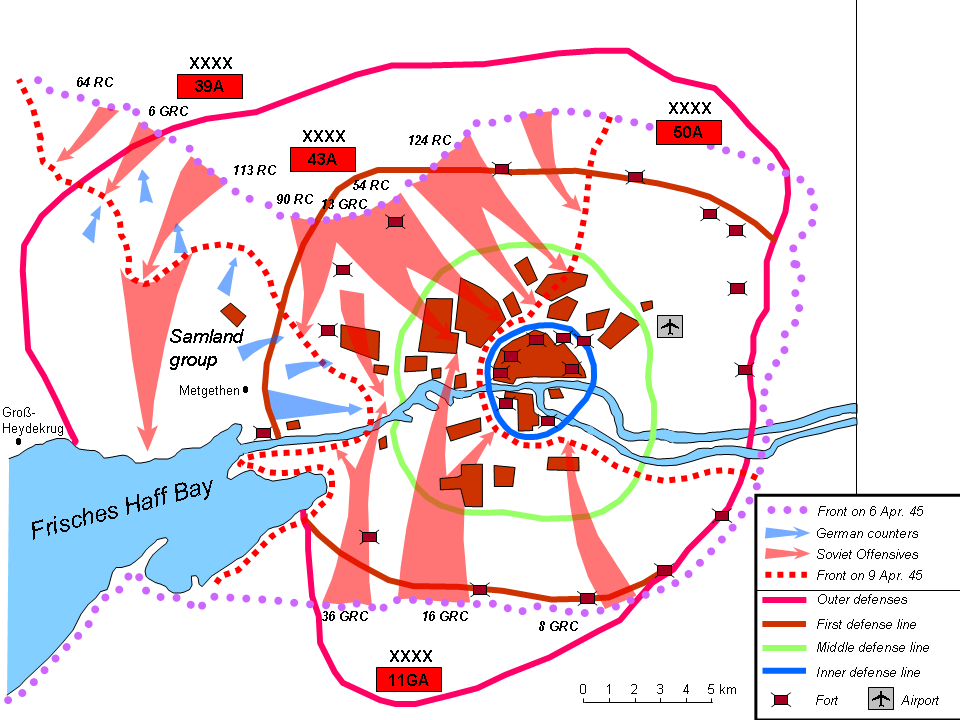
- Königsberg defenses and Soviet attack from April 6 to 9, 1945
- Active: February 24 – April 26, 1945
- Country: Soviet Union
- Branch: Red Army
- Type: Operational Group Command
- Size: Up to five Combined arms Armies; one Air Army
- Part of: 3rd Belorussian Front
- Engagements: Battle of Königsberg; Samland Offensive

Commanders
- Notable commanders: Army Gen. Ivan Khristoforovich Bagramyan

The Zemland Group of Forces (Russian: Земландская группа войск, romanized: Zemlandskaya gruppa voysk) was a front-sized operational group of the Red Army during the Second World War which saw service for two months in the Sambia Peninsula (Samland, Zemland) of East Prussia in 1945. It blockaded the city of Königsberg in March and then took it by storm in early April, after which it mopped up the various isolated German forces in the peninsula until it was disbanded on April 26.

== Formation ==
Under STAVKA of the Supreme High Command order no. 11022 of February 9, 1945 the 43rd, 39th and 11th Guards Armies of 3rd Belorussian Front, which were in action close to the German fortified city of Königsberg, were transferred to 1st Baltic Front which was located to its north and east. By STAVKA order no. 11032 of February 21, 1945 the 1st Baltic was to be redesignated as the Zemland Group of Forces effective February 24. It was under command of Army Gen. I. K. Bagramyan, who had been in command of 1st Baltic, and was to come under control of 3rd Belorussian Front for the final stages of the East Prussian Offensive. As of March 1 its main order of battle was as follows:

- 11th Guards Army
  - 8th Guards Rifle Corps (5th, 26th, 83rd Guards Rifle Divisions)
  - 16th Guards Rifle Corps (1st, 11th, 31st Guards Rifle Divisions)
  - 36th Guards Rifle Corps (16th, 18th, 84th Guards Rifle Divisions)
- 39th Army
  - 5th Guards Rifle Corps (17th, 19th, 91st Guards Rifle Divisions)
  - 54th Rifle Corps (24th Guards, 126th, 235th Rifle Divisions)
  - 94th Rifle Corps (124th, 358th Rifle Divisions)
  - 113th Rifle Corps (192nd, 221st, 262nd, 338th Rifle Divisions)
- 43rd Army
  - 13th Guards Rifle Corps (33rd Guards, 87th Guards, 182nd, 263rd Rifle Divisions)
  - 90th Rifle Corps (26th, 319th Rifle Divisions)
  - 103rd Rifle Corps (115th, 325th Rifle Divisions)
- 3rd Air Army

By the beginning of April, just prior to the start of the final offensive against the city the Group had been reinforced with an additional two armies:

- 2nd Guards Army
  - 11th Guards Rifle Corps (2nd, 3rd, 32nd Guards Rifle Divisions)
  - 60th Rifle Corps (154th, 251st, 334th Rifle Divisions)
  - 103rd Rifle Corps (moved from 43rd Army with 182nd Rifle Division from 13th Guards Rifle Corps)
- 50th Army
  - 69th Rifle Corps (110th, 153rd, 324th Rifle Divisions)
  - 81st Rifle Corps (2nd, 307th, 343rd Rifle Divisions)

=== Disbandment ===
On April 26 the Zemland Group was formally disbanded and most of its forces reverted to direct command of 3rd Belorussian Front, which was led by General Bagramyan for the duration of the war.
