= Gorodok offensive =

Soviet Red Army offensive operation

- Part of the Eastern Front of World War II
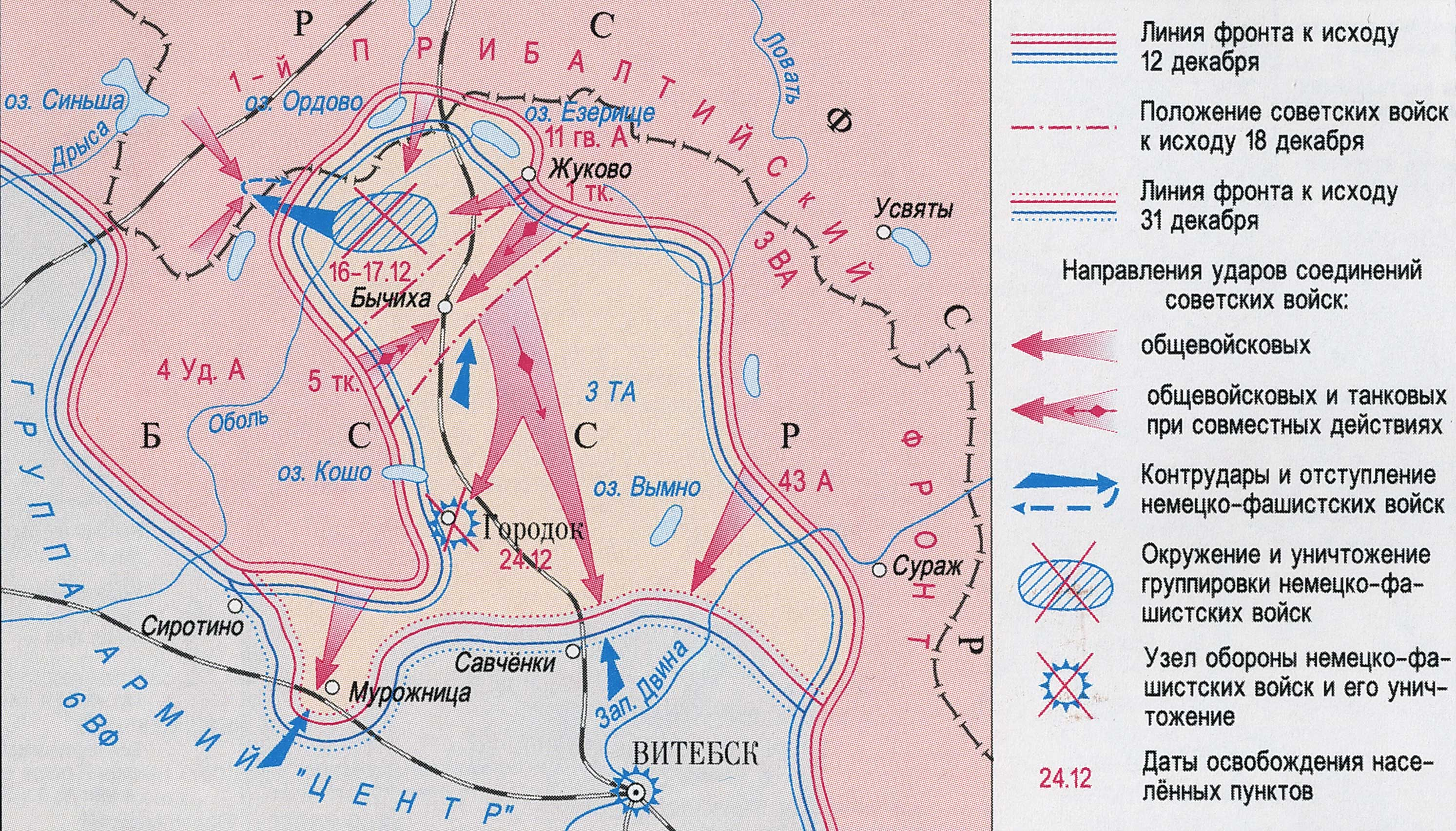
Date	13–31 December 1943
Location	Vitebsk Region, Belorussia
Result	Inconclusive

Belligerents
Germany	Soviet Union

Commanders and leaders
(Nazi Germany) Gunther von Kluge	(Soviet Union) Ivan Bagramyan

Units involved
3rd Panzer Army	1st Baltic Front

Strength
Unknown	275 tanks and assault guns 2,150 guns and mortars

The Gorodok offensive (Russian: Городокская наступательная операция) was an offensive operation by the Red Army's 1st Baltic Front against German forces of the 3rd Panzer Army around the town of Gorodok in northeastern Belorussia between 13 and 31 December 1943 on the Eastern Front of World War II The offensive had the goal of eliminating the Gorodok salient, encircling and destroying the 3rd Panzer Army, and capture Gorodok and Vitebsk. Although Soviet forces managed to eliminate the Gorodok salient, they failed to destroy the 3rd Panzer Army or capture Vitebsk.

== Background ==
The offensive had the goal of destroying the German forces around Gorodok and eliminating the threat of the encirclement of the Soviet troops west and southwest of Nevel. In the Gorodok salient, which arose from the final stage of the Nevel offensive, the German 3rd Panzer Army of Günther von Kluge's Army Group Center held defensive positions. A postwar Soviet estimate of the German strength was nine infantry and tank divisions, with 120 tanks and assault guns, and up to 800 guns and mortars.

By the beginning of the offensive, the Ivan Bagramyan's 1st Baltic Front included the 4th Shock, 11th Guards, 43rd, and 39th Armies. Front mobile forces were the 1st Tank Corps, 5th Tank Corps, and 3rd Guards Cavalry Corps. The 3rd Air Army provided air support for the front.

Kuzma Galitsky's 11th Guards Army, supported by the 1st Tank Corps, and Vasily Shvetsov's 4th Shock Army, supported by the 5th Tank and 3rd Guards Cavalry Corps, were tasked with the main objective of the operation. These forces included 20 divisions, 275 tanks and assault guns, and 2,150 guns and mortars. The main objective of the operation, as planned, was an attack towards the Bychikha station to break through the German defenses on the flank of the salient, surround and destroy the German forces around Gorodok. After the destruction of these forces the two armies were to develop the offensive to the south to take Gorodok and Vitebsk. Konstantin Golubev's 43rd Army and Nikolai Berzarin's 39th Army were tasked with supporting attacks to pin down the German troops and assist in the encirclement of the German troops in the salient.

== Offensive ==
The 11th Guards and 4th Shock Armies began the offensive on 13 December. Bad weather limited the operations of the 3rd Air Army. On the right flank the 11th Guards Army, carrying out the main attack with only two rifle divisions of the 36th Guards Rifle Corps, broke through the first German defensive positions. At the same time the 4th Shock Army broke through the main zone of the German defense. On 14 December Galitsky shifted the main attack from the center to the zone of the 36th Rifle Corps and sent the 83rd Guards Rifle Division and then the 1st Tank Corps into action there. The 1st Tank Corps reached the area of Bychikha station on 16 December, where it linked up with the 5th Tank Corps of the 4th Shock Army. Four German infantry divisions were encircled. Two of them were destroyed by the 4th Shock Army during attempts to break out of encirclement. Simultaneously with the elimination of the encircled troops, Soviet troops developed the offensive to the south and on 22 December reached Gorodok. Breaking German resistance, the 11th Guards Army subsequently broke through three defensive lines and captured the town on 24 December. In conjunction with the 4th Shock Army and the 43rd Army it continued the offensive on Vitebsk. By the end of 31 December the 4th Shock and 11th Guards Armies came up to the German defensive line northwest of Vitebsk, but could not break through and went over to the defensive.

== Results ==
The offensive resulted in the elimination of the Gorodok salient. Soviet forces claimed to have defeated six infantry divisions and one tank division, liberated 1,220 settlements, wiped out more than 65,000 soldiers and captured 3,300, in addition to capturing large amounts of equipment and supplies. The failure to take Vitebsk was blamed on insufficient numerical superiority over the German troops, shortages of ammunition and poor weather conditions that prevented effective artillery and air support.
