= 290th Division =

290th Division may refer to:

- 290th Infantry Division, Wehrmacht, Germany
- 290th Rifle Division, Soviet Union

== See also ==
- List of military divisions by number
