= 153rd Rifle Division (1943–1946) =

153rd Rifle Division (May 18, 1943 – February 1946)
- Active: 1943–1946
- Country: Soviet Union
- Branch: Red Army (1939-46)
- Type: Infantry
- Size: Division
- Engagements: Smolensk operation Orsha offensives (1943); Operation Bagration; Mogilev offensive Minsk offensive Belostok offensive East Prussian offensive Heiligenbeil Pocket; Battle of Königsberg; Samland offensive
- Decorations: Order of the Red Banner; Order of Kutuzov
- Battle honours: Smolensk

Commanders
- Notable commanders: Col. Nikolai Aleksandrovich Krasnov; Col. Aleksandr Aleksandrovich Shchennikov; Col. Aleksandr Aleksandrovich Smirnov

The third 153rd Rifle Division began forming at Rzhev on May 18, 1943, based on a pair of rifle brigades. It served as an infantry division of the Red Army into the postwar period, originally on the basis of the shtat (table of organization and equipment) of December 10, 1942. It was initially assigned to the 68th Army in the Reserve of the Supreme High Command. After entering Western Front on July 12 it was transferred to 5th Army of the same Front just prior to the summer offensive toward Smolensk. During the offensive it was transferred to 21st Army of the same Front, and in late September it was awarded the name of that city as a battle honor. In October it became involved in a series of unsuccessful offensives toward Orsha, being transferred to 33rd Army later that month. During the grinding offensives southeast of Vitebsk during the winter the division returned to 5th Army, and by the end of January 1944 it was so badly depleted it was moved to the Reserve of the Supreme High Command for rebuilding. When it returned to the active army in late May it was assigned to 2nd Belorussian Front and soon the 49th Army of that Front. Under these commands the division took part in crushing the German 4th Army's bridgehead on the east bank of the Dniepr River near Mogilev during the first days of the summer offensive in Belarus, and then drove forward to cross the Berezina before the end of June. For these accomplishments it was awarded the Order of the Red Banner. After being transferred to 50th Army in mid-July it participated in the capture of Grodno, and soon received the Order of Kutuzov. In August it was placed in reserve for rest and refitting before returning to the 50th in October. During the invasion of East Prussia in January 1945 it successfully battled through the fortified Masurian Lake District and all its regiments received battle honors or decorations. It was soon transferred to 3rd Belorussian Front with its Army and fought through February to defeat the German grouping around Heiligenbeil. It was then shifted northeast of Königsberg to prepare for the final assault on that city which began on April 6 and which earned one of the division's regiments its name as a battle honor. The 153rd remained in East Prussia for the remainder of the war and into the postwar period, before beginning to move east in late September. It arrived in Voroshilovgrad Region where it was disbanded beginning in February 1946.

== Formation ==
The division began forming on May 18, 1943, in and around Rzhev, on the basis of the 136th Rifle Brigade and the 2nd formation of the 122nd Rifle Brigade.

=== 122nd Rifle Brigade ===
This unit began forming in the South Ural Military District in January, and remained there training until May. It then loaded on rail cars and traveled west where it was assigned to the Reserve of the Supreme High Command near Moscow. It was disbanded there almost immediately to provide resources for the new 153rd.

=== 136th Rifle Brigade ===
The 136th was formed in the Volga Military District from December 1941 through March 1942 before entraining in April, moving west to join 30th Army in Kalinin Front. During August it was moved to the Front reserves until it was reassigned in November to the Front's 39th Army just prior to the start of Operation Mars.

This Army was tasked with making a diversionary attack on the Molodoi Tud sector. On November 25, the first day of the offensive, the 136th attacked the 413th Regiment of the 206th Infantry Division alongside the 709th Rifle Regiment of the 178th Rifle Division and the 28th Tank Regiment. This heavy thrust broke the forward defenses and penetrated 4km to the outskirts of Trushkovo before being halted by reserves. The next day the 136th and the tanks pushed westward toward Zaitsevo but could not take Trushkovo. Although the place finally fell, by the first week of December the brigade had been shifted to a quieter sector of the line. Following the failure of this offensive it remained in the 39th until May 1943, when it was moved to the Reserve of the Supreme High Command in the Moscow Defence Zone to help form the new 153rd.

In addition to these cadres the division also received 2,400 sailors from the Black Sea Fleet and the Volga Flotilla. It came under command of Col. Nikolai Aleksandrovich Krasnov, the commander of the 136th, on the day it began forming. During June the forming division was assigned to 68th Army, still in the Reserve. Its order of battle was very similar to that of the 2nd formation:

- 557th Rifle Regiment
- 563rd Rifle Regiment
- 566th Rifle Regiment
- 1035th Artillery Regiment
- 412th Antitank Battalion
- 237th Reconnaissance Company
- 334th Sapper Battalion
- 654th Signal Battalion (later 144th Signal Company)
- 250th Medical/Sanitation Battalion
- 162nd Chemical Defense (Anti-gas) Platoon
- 534th Motor Transport Company
- 379th Field Bakery
- 849th Divisional Veterinary Hospital
- 1781st Field Postal Station
- 1738th Field Office of the State Bank

On July 10 Colonel Krasnov declared the division to be combat ready, and two days later it entered the fighting line as part of Western Front. On July 20 it became part of 62nd Rifle Corps, along with the 154th and 159th Rifle Divisions.

== Battle of Smolensk ==
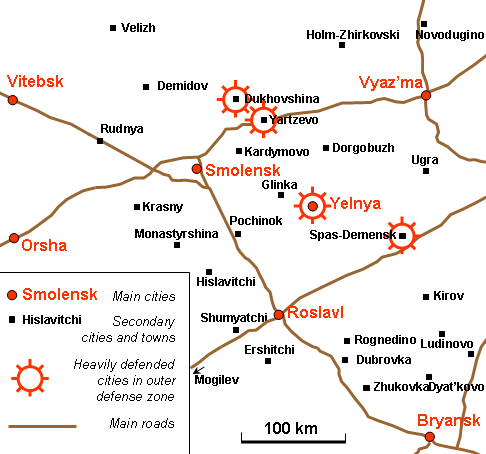
General layout of the Smolensk region during the offensive

On August 3 the 62nd Corps was transferred to 5th Army and began moving 5km to the north to a new jumping-off point. Operation Suvorov began on August 7 with a preliminary bombardment at 0440 hours and a ground assault at 0630. The commander of Western Front, Col. Gen. V. D. Sokolovskii, committed his 5th, 10th Guards, and 33rd Armies in the initial assault, while 68th Army was in second echelon. The attack quickly encountered heavy opposition and stalled. By early afternoon, Sokolovskii became concerned about the inability of most of his units to advance and decided to commit 68th Army's 81st Rifle Corps to reinforce the push by 10th Guards Army against XII Army Corps. This was a premature and foolish decision on a number of levels, crowding an already stalled front with even more troops and vehicles.

On the morning of August 8, Sokolovskii resumed his offensive at 0730 hours, but now he had three armies tangled up on the main axis of advance. After a 30-minute artillery preparation the Soviets resumed their attacks across a 10km-wide front. 81st Corps was inserted between the two engaged corps of 10th Guards, putting further pressure on the 268th Infantry Division. Reinforcements from 2nd Panzer Division were coming up from Yelnya in support. By August 11 it became clear that XII Corps was running out of infantry and so late in the day the German forces began falling back toward the Yelnya–Spas-Demensk railway. By now Western Front had expended nearly all its artillery ammunition and was not able to immediately exploit the withdrawal. Sokolovskii was authorized to temporarily suspend Suvorov on August 21.

In the following regrouping 62nd Corps was transferred to 49th Army but the 153rd was moved to 21st Army where it was directly under Army command. The STAVKA had given Sokolovskii only one week to renew the offensive. The plan, approved on August 22, placed the main effort in the center with 10th Guards, 21st, 33rd, and 68th Armies. These were to shatter XII Corps before pushing mobile groups through the gaps in order to capture Yelnya. At the same time the 5th and 31st Armies would conduct a support operation in order to threaten Dorogobuzh and Yartsevo. Marshal of Artillery N. N. Voronov worked to improve the ammunition supply and 21st Army was reinforced with seven artillery brigades and a sapper brigade, as well as 2nd Guards Tank Corps for the exploitation role.

=== Battle for Yelnya ===
The renewed offensive began at 0800 hours on August 28 with a 90-minute artillery preparation on a 25km-wide front southeast of Yelnya by 10th Guards, 21st, and 33rd Armies. When the infantry went in at 0930 the main effort proved to be in the 33rd Army sector against the boundary between IX Army Corps and Gruppe Harpe (former XII Corps). This rocked the 20th Panzergrenadier Division of IX Corps, and when a gap appeared the 5th Mechanized Corps was committed at Koshelevo. 21st and 10th Guards Armies attacked the positions of Battlegroup Vincenz around Terenino Station, held by one infantry battalion and an engineer unit. IX Corps threw in its meagre tactical reserves and the fighting continued for about eight hours until Vincenz was broken into fragments and began pulling back to the Ugra River. Altogether, Western Front managed to advance 6-8km. On the following day, 10th Guards mopped up those German units that had not escaped across the river while advancing up the rail line toward Yelnya. By dusk the right flank of IX Corps was near collapse and 6th Guards Cavalry Corps was committed into the gap.

The offensive gathered momentum on August 30 with the remnants of Vincenz and the 35th Infantry Division in full retreat. 2nd Panzer Division, with just 15 tanks and under 800 infantry, tried to counterattack but had little effect. 21st Army committed 2nd Guards Tanks at noon, and this unit gained 20km in a few hours; meanwhile, 10th Guards was advancing directly toward Yelnya. At 1330 hours the evacuation of the city began. Soviet infantry and tanks arrived by 1700 and two hours later it was in their hands. Dorogobuzh was surrendered the same day. There were now only 75km remaining to Smolensk. German 4th Army was looking at disaster on September 1, but by then Sokolovskii's advance units were again plagued by shortages of fuel, ammunition and transport, and nine of his rifle divisions had been reduced to 3,000 men or fewer.

=== Advance to Smolensk ===
4th Army got a tenuous new front established by September 3, based on XXXIX Panzer Corps, 1st SS Infantry Brigade, and the 78th Sturm Division. Sokolovskii continued with small-scale attacks until September 7, but his forces were incapable of another breakthrough. STAVKA authorized another temporary suspension the same day. As well, Colonel Krasnov was wounded and hospitalized, and the 153rd was placed in the hands of Col. Zakhari Petrovich Vydrigan, who was concurrently deputy commander of the 76th Rifle Division. Krasnov would return on September 27.

As of September 9 the 4th Army was attempting to hold a front of 164km with just 21,500 troops. Suvorov was resumed on September 14 by Kalinin Front and the next day by Western Front. Attacks by 31st and 5th Armies immediately gained ground and the 18th Panzergrenadier Division was forced back to the outskirts of Yartsevo. This was taken by the 274th Rifle Division the same day. This was not Sokolovskii's main effort, which was launched by 21st, 33rd, 68th, and 10th Guards Armies against the five decimated divisions of IX Corps holding a 40km-wide front in the Hubertus-I-Stellung west of Yelnya. A 90-minute artillery preparation preceded the ground attack at 0715 hours. 21st Army, backed by about 60 tanks, struck 78th Sturm and punched a hole between two of its regiments. The 21st and 10th Guards Armies continued attacking through the morning and early afternoon, producing further small penetrations, none of which were deeper than 3km, but the right flank of IX Corps had been badly damaged. The attacks resumed on September 16 at 0630, with shock groups from five divisions attacking 78th Sturm, advancing 2km in six hours. At 1600 4th Army ordered IX Corps to pull back to the Hubertus-II-Stellung, which was carried out overnight.

Sokolovskii committed his mobile reserves once the German withdrawal was confirmed. 21st and 33rd Armies, with 6th Guards Cavalry, would pivot southwestward, with the intention of cutting the Smolensk–Roslavl railroad near Pochinok. The 153rd was in the vanguard of the 21st, and made an unexpected march through marshy terrain, reaching the German rear. On September 22 it was the first to cut the railroad, some 30km south of Smolensk. By now IX Corps was a broken and retreating formation. In the event, the converging Soviet armies had to pause for a few days outside the city before making the final push. On the morning of September 22 the 68th Army achieved a clear breakthrough south-east of Smolensk, in the sector held by remnants of 35th Infantry. By the next morning it was clear that the Hubertus-III-Stellung could not be held. The commander of 4th Army made preparations to evacuate the city. Sokolovskii knew that 4th Army was not likely to fight for Smolensk and he wanted the city secured before it was completely destroyed. At 1000 hours the next day 68th Army advanced into the southern part of the city and linked up with units of 5th and 31st Armies. For its role in this victory the division was recognized with a battle honor:

SMOLENSK - 153rd Rifle Division (Colonel Krasnov, Nikolai Ivanovich)... The troops who participated in the battles of Smolensk and Roslavl, by the order of the Supreme High Command of September 25, 1943, and a commendation in Moscow, are given a salute of 20 artillery salvoes from 224 guns.

4th Army fell back to the Dora-Stellung overnight on September 26/27. The onus of pursuit along the Minsk–Moscow Highway fell on the 5th and 68th Armies as more battle-weary armies were pulled out of the line to regroup. As 21st Army regrouped the 153rd was assigned to 69th Rifle Corps.

== Into Belarus ==
Western Front now began operations toward Orsha. The lead elements of 21st Army's 69th and 61st Rifle Corps arrived at positions on the Myareya River late on October 2 from Baevo south to Lyenina. 2nd Guards Tanks was in support, although badly worn down by previous fighting. The Army was facing the right flank of 25th Panzergrenadier Division opposite Baevo and the 337th Infantry Division at Lyenina. The next day the 153rd and 174th Divisions of 69th Corps attempted to force the river south of Baevo, while two divisions of 61st Corps attempted the same at and north of Lyenina. This unsuccessful effort continued until October 8, when the Army paused to regroup.

Sokolovskii began organizing a new offensive on Orsha to begin on October 12. This would take the form of two thrusts, with 21st and 33rd Armies forming the southern one. The 33rd would concentrate in the sector currently held by the 21st north and south of Lyenina, while the 21st side-stepped to new positions south of Baevo. Altogether the Army had 85 tanks and self-propelled guns in support. In total, Western Front amassed an attacking force of 19 rifle divisions with artillery support of 150-200 guns and mortars per kilometre of front. The preparation lasted 85 minutes and while the fighting continued for two days the German defense proved effective and deadly to Soviet forces across the front; 21st Army gained no more than 300m-400m west of Baevo at a heavy cost in casualties.

=== Fourth and Fifth Orsha Offensives ===
Western Front carried out a major regrouping during October 16-20, although this was not actually complete until month's end. The headquarters of 21st Army was moved to the Front's reserve and the 153rd was reassigned to 33rd Army, where it joined the 144th and 222nd Rifle Divisions in 65th Rifle Corps. Sokolovskii planned for another offensive on Orsha to begin on November 14. Two shock groups were prepared, with the southern group consisting of elements of 5th and 33rd Armies south of the Dniepr on a 12km-wide sector. It would be supported with an artillery and air preparation of three-and-a-half hours duration as well as significant strength in armor. At this time the Front's rifle divisions averaged about 4,500 men each. 65th Rifle Corps was deployed between Volkolakovka and Rusany with the 144th in reserve. The 42nd and 222nd Divisions made limited progress in the direction of Guraki but the remainder of the Army's first echelon divisions faltered in the face of withering artillery and machine gun fire. The following day the commander of 33rd Army, Col. Gen. V. N. Gordov, committed the 153rd and 164th Divisions in repeated attacks against the positions of the 18th Panzergrenadiers in Guraki, to no avail. Only by releasing the relatively fresh 144th to battle on November 17 was his Army able to secure a 10km-wide and 3-4km deep bridgehead on the west bank of the Rossasenka River by the end of the next day, at which point the offensive collapsed from exhaustion. The entire effort, which was most successful on 33rd Army's sector, cost Western Front's four attacking armies 38,756 casualties. In preparation for a fifth offensive on Orsha Gordov shifted additional forces into the Rossasenka bridgehead, and in the attack which began on November 30 his divisions, in cooperation with 5th Army, managed to force the defenders back roughly 4km before the lines stabilized. Sokolovskii ordered the Front over to the defense on December 5. By this time the 153rd had been moved to 61st Corps, which was now in 33rd Army.

=== Battles for Vitebsk ===
Shortly after this 33rd Army was directed to redeploy substantially to the north to reinforce the left wing of 1st Baltic Front as it attempted to encircle and liberate the city of Vitebsk. When the redeployment and regrouping were completed on December 22 the Army had 13 rifle divisions on strength, supported by one tank corps, four tank brigades, and ten tank and self-propelled artillery regiments, plus substantial artillery. The 153rd, 159th, and 277th Rifle Divisions now formed 72nd Rifle Corps (under 5th Army as of December 8), with the 277th in second echelon. The attack began the following day in cooperation with 39th Army. The shock groups forced the defenders back about 1,000 metres on the first day but the commitment of second echelon divisions on December 24 enlarged the penetration to a depth of 2-3km. Despite the arrival of a battlegroup of Feldherrnhalle Panzergrenadier Division on December 25 the entire 33rd Army burst forward from 2-7km, reaching to within 20km of Vitebsk's city center. 33rd Army suffered 33,500 personnel killed, wounded or missing, plus the loss of 34 mortars and 67 guns, in fighting that continued until January 6, 1944.

On January 4 the 153rd was ordered to capture Height 218.4, which dominated the local terrain, as well as German strongpoints at Kosachi, Drynino, and Boboviki. These were defended by the 246th Infantry Division, which had doused the hill with water, creating an ice obstacle. Krasnov chose to attack first with his 557th Rifle Regiment. Following an artillery preparation the forward detachment advanced on January 7 and took the hill, quickly being reinforced by the 563rd Regiment. The hill was held despite counterattacks.

The STAVKA ordered the main offensive to be renewed the next day. 72nd Corps was tasked with widening the penetration and guarding the flank of 33rd Army. The Corps faced a 7km wide sector from Maklaki east to Miafli with the 153rd and 159th Divisions, plus 36th Rifle Brigade, in first echelon, supported by the 213th and 256th Tank Brigades, and the 277th Division in second echelon. Still opposed by the 246th Infantry, the objectives were strongpoints at Dymanovo, Drybino and Krynki, 2-4km from the start line, followed by an exploitation to the southwest to the Vitebsk–Orsha road. By now, all of Sokolovskii's divisions and tank brigades were under 40 percent strength. In two days of heavy fighting the Corps broke the defenses of part of the Feldherrnhalle, crossed the road, captured Dymanovo, and reached the approaches to Sheliai, 4.5km into the German defenses. By late on January 10 it appeared that 5th and 33rd Armies had created conditions for the commitment of 2nd Guards Tank Corps, if a crossing could be forced over the Luchesa River, just 1,000m farther on. However, German reserves were rapidly arriving, blocking any advance beyond Sheliai, and the Corps made no further progress over the next five days. By the end of January 14 the offensive was burned out, with the divisions down to 2,500 - 3,500 personnel each.

Despite the weakness of his forces, the commander of 5th Army, Lt. Gen. N. I. Krylov, stated later:

Undoubtedly, the seizure of the Vitebsk-Orsha main road was a major success. At the same time, this situation created certain complications since the enemy continued to hold on to the region around the village of Krynki, situated 5 kilometres east of Dymanovo, which was occupied by our forces. By doing so, he threatened 5th Army's entire left wing with a penetration to the north in the direction of Eremino, which, if carried out, could force our forces to withdraw behind the line of the Vitebsk-Smolensk railroad.
Thus, the mission of improving its position now gained far greater importance for 5th Army since only by doing so could we prevent an enemy penetration to the north.

He therefore prepared a new offensive to take place on January 15, to the south toward Krynki. Reinforcements from 33rd Army were transferred to 72nd Corps, in addition to several tank corps. The 153rd was not included in the Army's shock group. After several days of heavy fighting this had taken Krynki and gained about 2km east of that place, but Miafli and a section of the railroad remained in German hands when the effort was halted on January 20. Sixteen days of battle had cost Western Front another 25,000 casualties, 5,500 of whom were killed, for a gain of no more than 4km. In a subsequent operation the 153rd's 557th Regiment occupied the village of Gory on January 30, after which the division was withdrawn into reserve.

On February 7 Colonel Krasnov was wounded and hospitalized; he would be in recovery until May 15 and would later lead the 334th Rifle and 33rd Guards Rifle Divisions. He was replaced for a week by Col. Vasilii Aleksandrovich Katyushin, who was in turn replaced on February 15 by Col. Aleksandr Aleksandrovich Shchennikov; this officer had most recently led the 36th Rifle Brigade and the 157th Rifle Division. Three days later the 153rd was pulled back to Staritsa for rebuilding, and on February 25 officially entered 81st Corps of 20th Army in the Reserve of the Supreme High Command.

== Operation Bagration ==
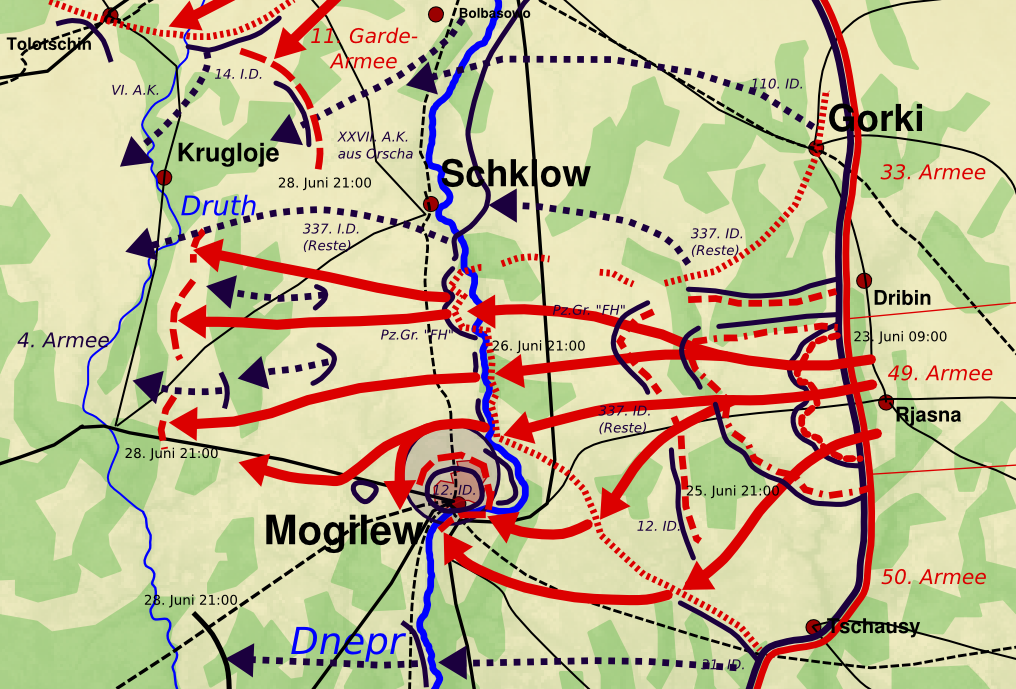
Mogilev offensive of Operation Bagration, June 22-28. Note advance of 49th Army.

By the start of May the 153rd had left 20th Army but remained under 81st Corps in the Reserve. On May 28 it returned to the fighting front when this Corps was assigned to 2nd Belorussian Front. Just before the start of the summer offensive the Corps was assigned to 49th Army of that Front. The Front was under command of Col. Gen. G. F. Zakharov, and its primary task in the summer offensive would be the liberation of Mogilev, while also pinning the good-quality divisions of XXXIX Panzer Corps to prevent them reinforcing other sectors. Of the Front's three armies (33rd, 50th, and 49th) the latter had by far the preponderance of forces, as it was intended to take the city and to advance along the one good highway through the marsh country to the west. It faced the 337th and 12th Infantry Divisions.

=== Mogilev Offensive ===
At 0600 hours on June 22, preceded by a 30-minute artillery barrage, a company from each of the Army's front-line divisions attacked the sectors of the two German divisions to determine the extent of the defenses. During the night of June 22/23, heavy air attacks by 4th Air Army on the German main line of resistance muffled the sound of Soviet tanks and self-propelled guns moving into position. Morning fog delayed the attack until 0700 when a two-hour artillery bombardment successfully silenced the German artillery. Infantry, backed by 200 tanks, jumped off at 0900 in the 337th Infantry's sector, overrunning all three trench lines of the main defense zone, crossing the Pronia River. The 337th lost six artillery batteries, indicating its infantrymen had been overwhelmed before the guns could retreat. By noon the Army had advanced 4-6km, but the tanks and self-propelled guns had difficulty in crossing the Pronia because the two bridges in the area had been demolished.

Late in the day the 49th's advance was halted by counterattacks. Feldherrnhalle Division was ordered to take over and defend a 20km-wide section of the 337th's original sector. Overall, German 4th Army's main defense had been penetrated to a depth of 8km on this sector. The commander of this Army, Gen. K. von Tippelskirch, asked permission to finally abandon the XXXIX Corps bridgehead on the east bank of the Dniepr, but this was denied. On the morning of June 24 the 49th Army, supported by 121st Rifle Corps of 50th Army, renewed the assault against both divisions following a massive 30-minute artillery preparation. By noon a gap in the defense had been opened east of Chernevka; the 337th had lost most of its artillery and was disintegrating, and a forward detachment of 42nd Division, with the rest of 69th Rifle Corps following, reached the town at 1700 and made a crossing of the Basia River. The assault continued the next day at 0600 and by midnight the Army was approaching the Dniepr bridges at Mogilev and crossings began on the morning of June 26.

By that evening the 49th was across the Dniepr in force, and von Tippelskirch was finally given the order to evacuate the east bank of the river, but by this time the five divisions there had been chewed up and could no longer escape. At 0630 on June 27 the Army continued to drive back the remnants of the 337th and Feldherrnhalle north of Mogilev. The only hope left to 4th Army was to retreat faster than the Red Army could follow. On June 28 Mogilev fell to a combined attack by 49th and 50th Armies. On July 10 the 153rd would be awarded the Order of the Red Banner for its part in the liberation of Mogilev, Shklow and Bykhaw and the crossings of the Pronia and Dniepr. At 1745 hours von Tippelskirch was finally ordered to retreat behind the Berezina as quickly as possible due to the disasters that had unfolded at Orsha and Babruysk but this was far too late. By July 1 the division had been transferred to 69th Corps, joining the 42nd Division.

=== Pursuit toward Poland ===
In order to complete the pursuit of the defeated German forces, late on June 28 the STAVKA directed 2nd Belorussian Front to develop a rapid offensive in the direction of Minsk, capture that place, and reach the west bank of the Svislach River no later than July 8, in conjunction with 3rd Belorussian Front. During June 29-30 the 49th forced a crossing of the Drut River and was pursuing along the Mogilev–Minsk road. 4th Army, in its haste to retreat, was only contesting the main roads; the 153rd was able to use forest roads to cover about 50km during these two days. Its forward detachment, consisting of all its motorized transport and weapons, reached the Berezina north of Berezino and forced a crossing off the march while Zakharov's main forces were still 25-30km from the river. On July 1 the 49th's forward detachments encountered stubborn resistance in the Pahost area and were forced to wage heavy fighting to capture the crossings over the Berezina south of Berezino.

On July 3 the Front's pursuit continued. 49th Army completed forcing the Berezina, occupied Byerazino, and advanced another 25-40km to the west. On the same day Minsk was liberated and most of what remained of Army Group Center was completely encircled. On July 9, the Army was tasked with the elimination of this pocket, in what was called the Osovets Offensive. However, on the same date the 69th Corps was transferred to 50th Army, which continued the pursuit toward the Polish frontier.

The forward detachments of 50th Army reached the east bank of the Neman River by the end of July 13, along with the bulk of the forces of 3rd Belorussian Front. Crossing operations began the next day in the sector of 11th Guards Army near Alytus. The German 4th Army and 3rd Panzer Army had more than 10 divisions (including two panzer) and several panzer brigades on defense, with more arriving. On the same day the 3rd Guards Cavalry Corps was fighting in the northern outskirts of Grodno while also forcing the Neman. By 0400 hours on July 16 the 69th Corps, in cooperation with 31st Army's 36th Rifle Corps, had completely cleared the city. As a result, on July 25 the 153rd would be awarded the Order of Kutuzov, 2nd Degree.

By the end of August the division had been withdrawn to the reserves of 2nd Belorussian Front for rest and replenishment. In October it returned to 69th Corps and 50th Army, and it would remain under these commands into peacetime. On November 13 Colonel Shchennikov was hospitalized due to illness, and was replaced by Maj. Gen. Nikolai Kuzmich Maslennikov until December 25, when Col. Aleksandr Aleksandrovich Smirnov took over. This officer had previously served as the division's deputy commander and would remain in command into the postwar.

== East Prussian Offensives ==
At the start of the new year the 69th Corps contained the 153rd, 110th, 191st and 324th Rifle Divisions. At the start of the winter offensive the 50th Army was deployed on the right flank of its Front, and had a defensive role in the first days, deployed on a line from Augustów to Osowiec to outside Nowogród. It was not ordered to advance until January 17, and it encountered heavy resistance from German rearguards, slowing its progress. The Army occupied the strongpoints of Arys and Johannisburg, and on January 26 was fighting along a line 8km southeast of Rhein, Ruciane-Nida, Mikołajki and Kerwin Station. According to Stalin's Order No. 258 of January 27 the 153rd was commended for its role in penetrating the pre-WWI German defenses in the Masurian Lake District and capturing a number of towns, including Rastenburg, the site of Hitler's Wolf's Lair headquarters. For this victory the 557th Rifle Regiment and the 1035th Artillery Regiment both received "Masurian" as a battle honor, and on April 5 the 563rd Regiment would be awarded the Order of Suvorov, 3rd Degree, while the 566th Regiment received the Order of Kutuzov in the same Degree. By the end of the month the 191st had been detached from 69th Corps.

=== Heiligenbeil Pocket ===
By February 8, elements of 50th Army had captured Heilsberg and fully penetrated the German permanent fortifications of East Prussia. The next day 50th Army was ordered to be transferred to 3rd Belorussian Front. At this time the German forces in East Prussia had been split into three groupings with the largest, a total of 14 infantry and two panzer divisions, south and southwest of Königsberg, in the general area of Heiligenbeil. 3rd Belorussian was tasked with destroying this grouping. The Front commander, Army Gen. I. D. Chernyakhovskii, decided to begin with those forces defending a salient in the Preußisch Eylau–Landsberg–Bartenstein area before proceeding in the direction of Heiligenbeil. 50th Army was to advance to the line Finken–Plauten before continuing to Kildenen.

Heavy fighting broke out on February 11 on the front of 50th Army and three other armies of the Front as German forces launched counterattacks based on Wormditt. This battle continued through the following days as the German grouping resisted all efforts to split it into parts and was stalemated until February 16 when the defenders fell back to straighten their lines. Two days later 50th Army was approaching the paved road from Landsberg to Mehlsack, and by February 21 began fighting for Peterswalde. On the same day the STAVKA formed the Zemland Group of Forces, although 50th Army was not yet part of it. From the end of February through the first 10 days of March the Front, now commanded by Marshal A. M. Vasilevskii following the death of Chernyakhovskii, prepared for a renewed offensive with replacements, new equipment, ammunition and other supplies. Most rifle divisions by this time had been reduced to under 3,000 personnel.

=== Battle of Königsberg ===
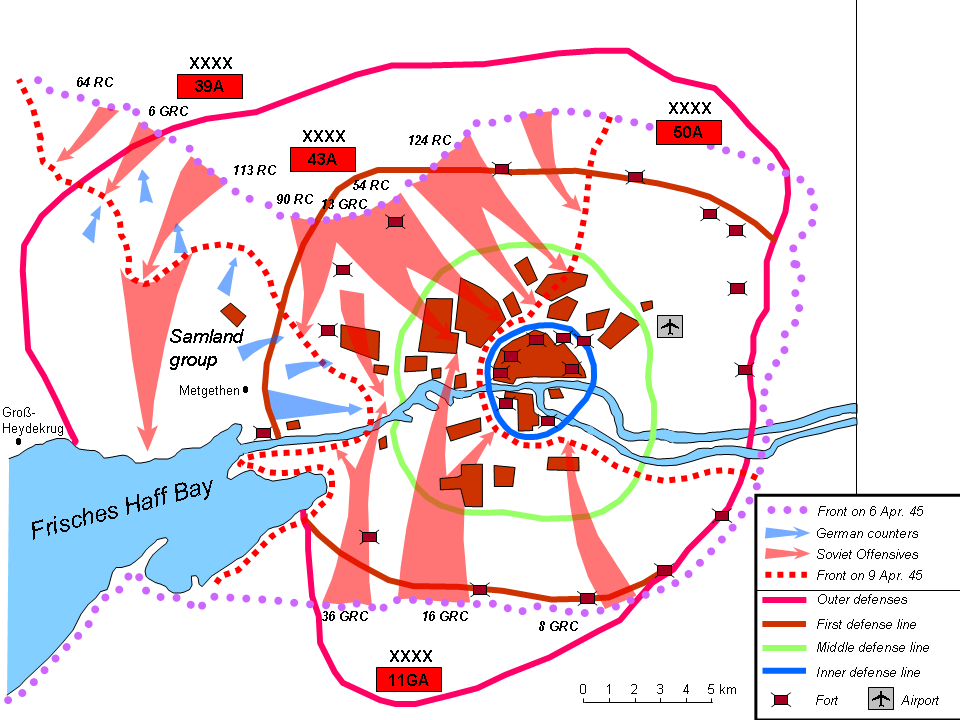
Battle of Königsberg. Note positions of 50th Army.

3rd Belorussian Front went back to the offensive at 1100 hours on March 13, after a 40-minute artillery preparation. However, 50th Army was in second echelon along with 2nd Guards Army, both of which now prepared for the battle for Königsberg. The 50th had been assigned to a new concentration area on March 8, with 69th Corps along the line Kanditten–Preußisch Eylau–Groß Lindenau–Hohenrade with the intention of concentrating around Trutenau and Praddau. Engineer and construction troops prepared crossings over the Pregel River. On March 14 the Army relieved elements of 39th and 11th Guards Armies along the line Zudau–Pregel River and began preparing for the offensive. For the defense of the city the German command had four well-equipped infantry divisions and several smaller units totaling more than 100,000 officers and men, 850 guns, and up to 60 tanks and assault guns, all of which were deployed in four fortified defensive lines. By the beginning of April the 50th Army had joined the Zemland Group.

The assault would be carried out by the 39th, 43rd, and 50th Armies north of the Pregel and 11th Guards from the south. The shock group of the 50th would be 81st and 124th Rifle Corps on its right flank, with 69th Corps holding along a broad front on the left. The Army was reinforced with the 159th Tank Brigade, three regiments of self-propelled guns, the 2nd Guards Artillery Division, and a variety of other artillery units. The right flank Corps would face the 367th Infantry Division. The artillery preparation began on April 6 at 1030 hours and continued for 90 minutes, when the infantry and tank assault began. By April 10 the last German scattered groups were being mopped up. Despite the 153rd not being included in the assaulting force, the 566th Rifle Regiment (Colonel Poznyakov, Nikolai Nikolaevich) would be awarded the city's name as a battle honor.

== Postwar ==
Following this battle the division was rested in the suburb of Neuhausen-Tiergarten. The Zemland Group was disbanded on April 26 and 50th Army returned to direct command of 3rd Belorussian Front. When the shooting stopped the men and women of the division shared the full title of 153rd Rifle, Smolensk, Order of the Red Banner, Order of Kutuzov Division. (Russian: 153-я стрелковая Смоленская Краснознамённая ордена Кутузова дивизия.) During July the division took part in an operation to comb through the forests of the Suwałki Region for German stragglers and fugitives. Until September 25 it was stationed in and around Gumbinnen, but on that date it began marching to the railway station at Suwałki for shipment to the USSR. It arrived in the Voroshilovgrad Region, where it was disbanded beginning in February 1946.
