= Zhizdra (river) =

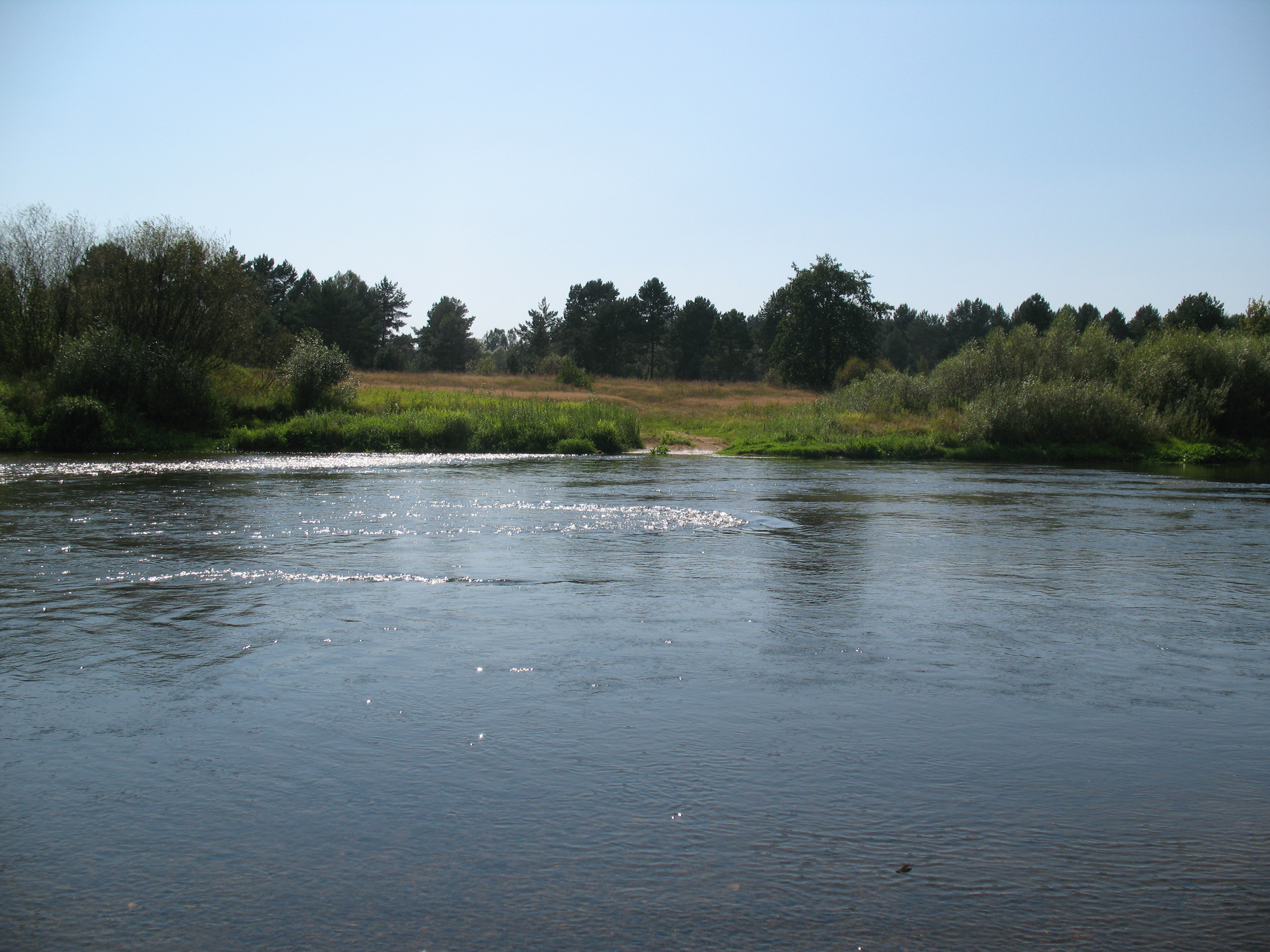

- Mouth of the Zhizdra
- Native name: Жиздра (Russian)

Location
- Country: Russia

Physical characteristics
- Mouth: Oka
  - coordinates: 54°14′09″N 36°11′38″E
- Length: 223 km (139 mi)
- Basin size: 9,170 km^{2} (3,540 sq mi)

Basin features
- Progression: Oka→ Volga→ Caspian Sea

The Zhizdra (Russian: Жиздра) is a river in Kaluga Oblast in Russia, a left tributary of the Oka. The length of the river is 223 kilometres (139 mi). The area of its basin is 9,170 square kilometres (3,540 sq mi). The Zhizdra freezes up in late November and stays icebound until early April. Its main tributaries are the Resseta, Vytebet, and Seryona. The towns of Kozelsk and Zhizdra are located on the shores of the Zhizdra. The name is of Lithuanian origin. In Lithuanian, žizdras means 'thick sand, gravel'.

The lower course of the Zhizdra is located in Ugra National Park.
