= Vytebet =

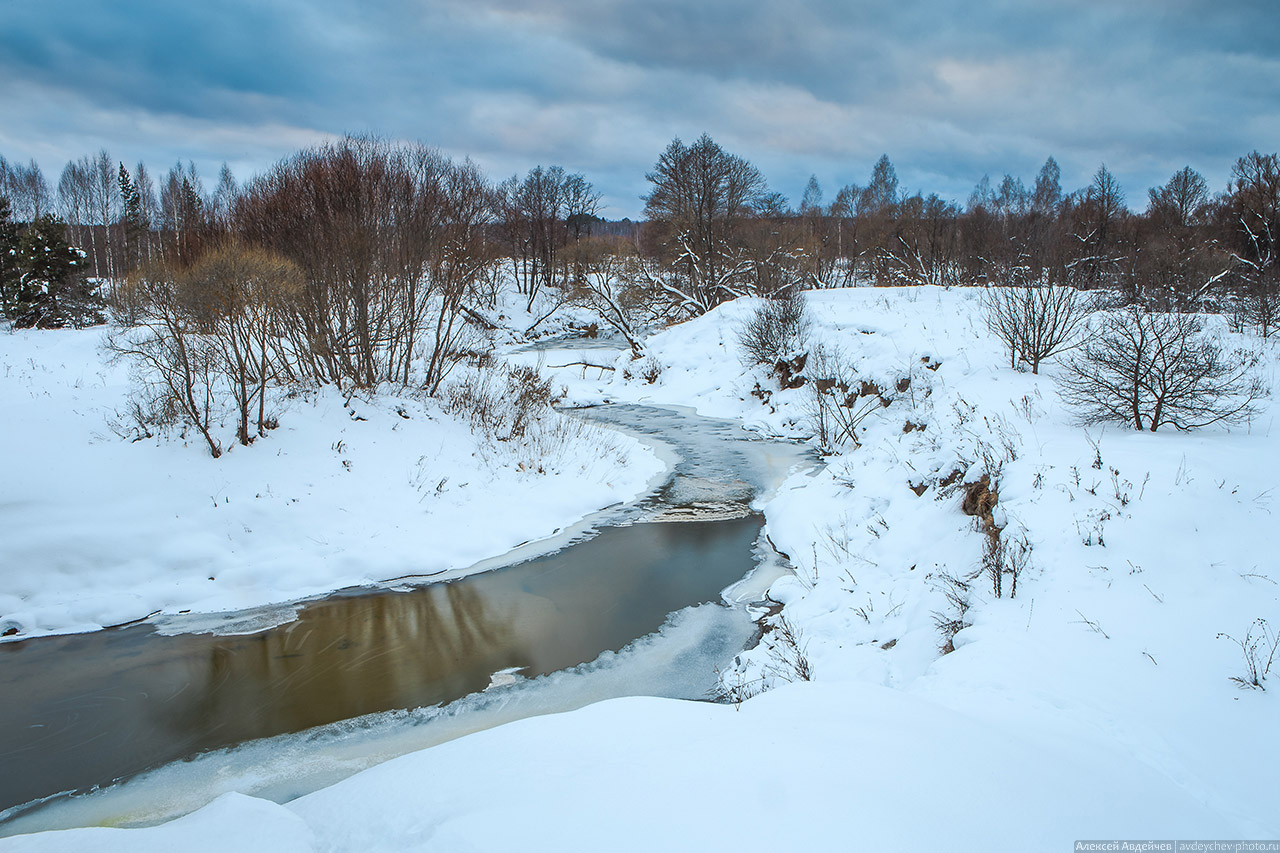
- Native name: Вытебеть (Russian)

Location
- Country: Russia

Physical characteristics
- Source
  - location: Yakovleva, Bryansk Oblast
  - coordinates: 53°6′26″N 35°13′40″E
  - elevation: 210 m (690 ft)
- Mouth: Zhizdra
  - coordinates: 53°53′4″N 35°38′14″E
  - elevation: 140 m (460 ft)
- Length: 133 km (83 mi)
- Basin size: 1,760 km^{2} (680 sq mi)

Basin features
- Progression: Zhizdra→ Oka→ Volga→ Caspian Sea

The Vytebet (Russian: Вытебеть) is a river that flows through the Bryansk, Oryol, and Kaluga Oblasts in Russia. The river is a right tributary of the Zhizdra, and its total length is 133 kilometers (83 mi) with a drainage basin of 1,760 square kilometers (680 mi^{2}).

The Vytebet flows through the Orlovskoye Polesye National Park.
