= Myatlevo =

Rural locality in Iznoskovsky District, Kaluga Oblast, Russia

Coordinates: 54.892801°N 35.674982°E

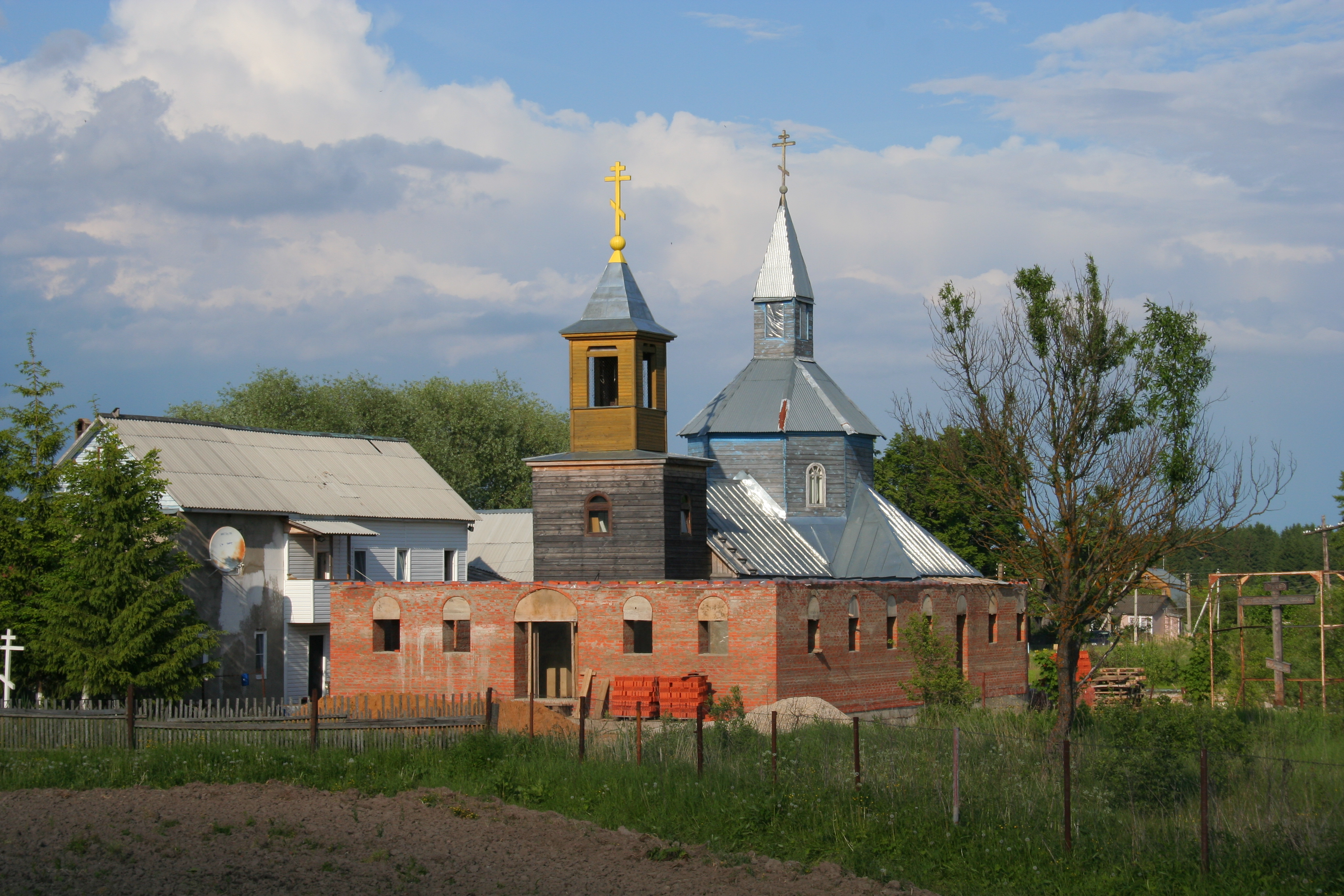
Myatlevo - Church

Myatlevo is a town in the Kaluga Oblast of Russia. Its zipcode is 249875.

== Town ==
Myatlevo had (2015) a population of 1969 people. The town lies at an altitude of 196 metres above sea level.
