= Chyhirynka =

Village in Mogilev Region, Belarus

Chyhirynka Чыгірынка (Belarusian)
- Village
- Location within Belarus
- Coordinates: 53°25′13″N 29°51′10″E
- Country: Belarus
- Region: Mogilev Region
- District: Kirawsk District
- Time zone: UTC+3 (MSK)

Chyhirynka or Chigirinka (Belarusian: Чыгірынка, romanized: Čyhirynka; Russian: Чигиринка) is a village in Kirawsk District, Mogilev Region, Belarus. It is part of Stayki selsoviet.

== History ==
The village was burned to the ground in 1943 by the Estonian collaborationist 658th Eastern Battalion under Major Alfons Rebane.

It was liberated in 1944 by the Soviet troops of the 1st Belorussian Front.

== See also ==
- Occupation of Belarus by Nazi Germany
