= Bychikha railway station =

Belarusian Railways station

Bychikha

General information
- Location: Belarus
- Coordinates: 55°40′47″N 29°58′50″E
- Owner: Belarusian Railway

Other information
- Status: Functioning
- Station code: 166210

History
- Opened: 1904
Location
- Location within Belarus

Bychikha (Belarusian: Бычыха) is a railway station in Bychikha, Belarus.
