= 290th Rifle Division =

- Active: 1941–1946
- Country: Soviet Union
- Branch: Red Army
- Type: Rifle division
- Engagements: World War II
- Decorations: Order of the Red Banner; Order of Suvorov 2nd class; Order of Kutuzov 2nd class
- Battle honours: Mogilev

The 290th Rifle Division (Russian: 290-я стрелковая дивизия) was an infantry division of the Soviet Union's Red Army during World War II.

Formed in the summer of 1941, the 290th fought in the Battle of Smolensk, Operation Bagration, the Vistula–Oder Offensive, and the East Pomeranian Offensive during the rest of the war before its postwar disbandment in 1946.

== History ==
The 290th began forming on 12 July 1941 at Kalyazin in the Moscow Military District from reservists. Its basic order of battle included the 878th, 882nd, and the 885th Rifle Regiments, as well as the 827th Artillery Regiment. After only five weeks, the division was assigned to the 50th Army. In late September, the division was encircled in the Bryansk pocket by Operation Typhoon, the German advance on Moscow. The division's remnants broke out from the pocket by 23 October. On 27 November the 827th Artillery Regiment was removed from the division and replaced by the 1420th Artillery Regiment on 22 January 1942. In May, the 290th transferred to the Western Front's 10th Army. During the last four months of 1943, the division was part of the 33rd Army, 49th Army, and the 68th Army, as it advanced from Smolensk to the Mogilev-Orsha line on the Dnieper. At the end of the year, the 290th transferred back to the 10th Army, but in spring 1944 it was moved to the 49th Army. The division fought in Operation Bagration and was awarded the Order of Kutuzov, 2nd class, for recapturing Grodno. By August it began to outrun its supply lines, and received 1200 rear area conscripts and militia from Grodno, and 380 newly drafted civilians from areas it advanced through as replacements.

In September, the 290th was transferred to the 3rd Army of the 2nd Belorussian Front, with which it fought in the Vistula–Oder Offensive and the East Pomeranian Offensive in early 1945. At the very end of the war, the 3rd Army was transferred to the 1st Belorussian Front, and became part of the front reserve during the Battle of Berlin. By the end of the war, the division's honorifics were "Mogilev, Order of the Red Banner, Orders of Suvorov and Kutuzov." The division was relocated to Chavusy in the Minsk Military District with the 35th Rifle Corps in the summer of 1945, and disbanded there in June 1946 along with the corps.
