= 69th Rifle Corps =

- Allegiance: Soviet Union
- Branch: Soviet Red Army
- Engagements: Eastern Front (World War II); Operation Barbarossa

The 69th Rifle Corps was a corps of the Soviet Red Army. It was part of the 20th Army. It took part in the Great Patriotic War.

== Organization ==
- 73rd Rifle Division
- 229th Rifle Division
- 233rd Rifle Division

== Commanders ==
- Major General Yevdokim Mogilovchik
- Major General Timofey Kruglyakov (July - November 1943)
