= Pyotr Shafranov =

Soviet colonel general (1901–1972)

Pyotr Grigoryevich Shafranov
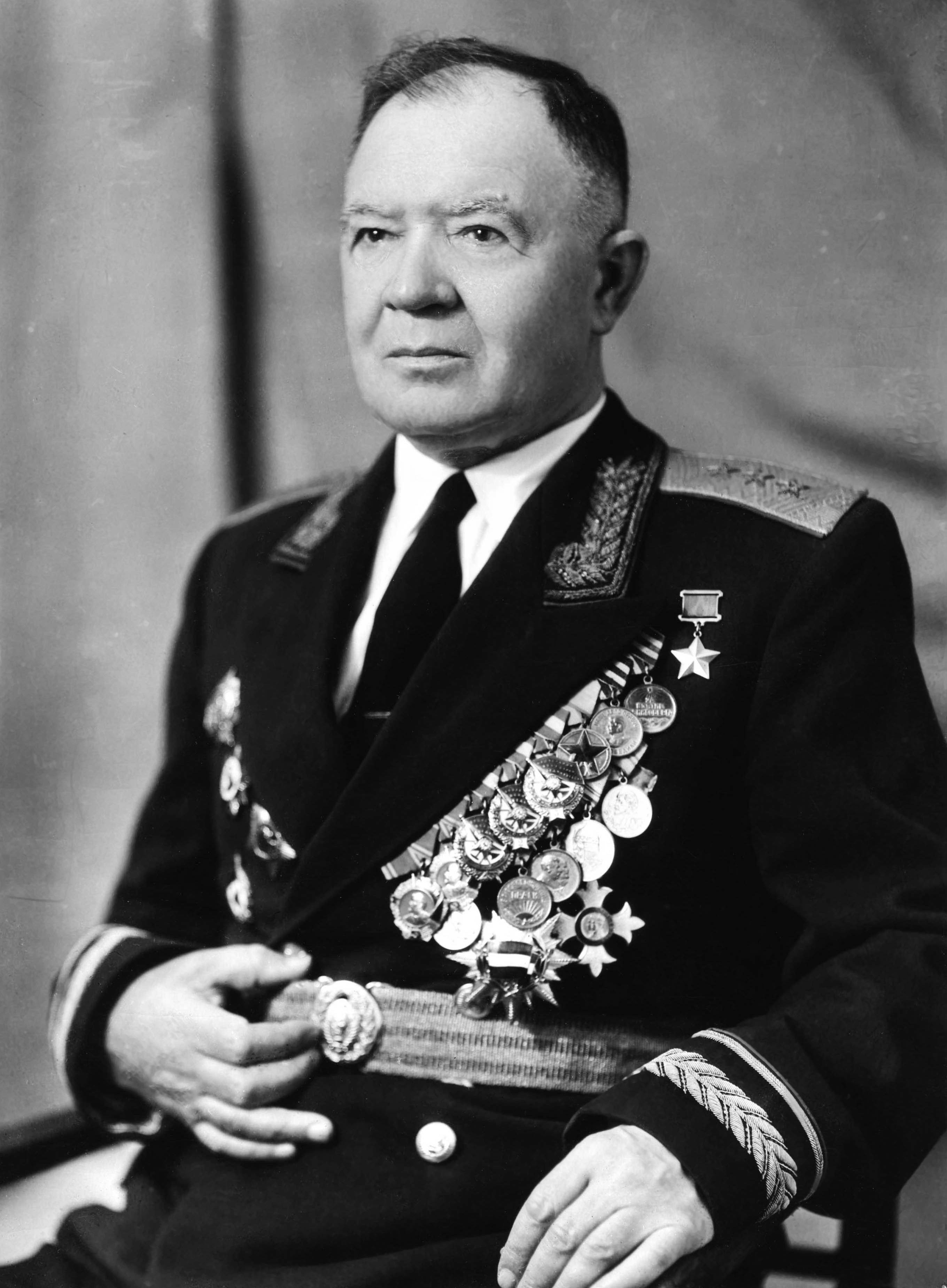
- Shafranov in 1965
- Born: 22 January [O.S. 9 January] 1901; Bolshoye Frolovoye, Tetyushsky Uyezd, Kazan Governorate, Russian Empire
- Died: 4 November 1972 (aged 71); Moscow, Soviet Union
- Military career
- Allegiance: Russian SFSR; Soviet Union
- Branch: Red Army (later Soviet Army)
- Service years: 1919–1965
- Rank: Colonel general
- Commands: 16th Guards Rifle Division; 36th Guards Rifle Corps; 5th Army; 31st Army; 28th Army; Ural Air Defense Army; Military Command Academy of the Air Defense Forces
- Conflicts: Russian Civil War; World War II
- Awards: Hero of the Soviet Union; Order of Lenin (2); Order of the Red Banner (3); Order of Suvorov, 2nd class; Order of Kutuzov, 2nd class; Order of Bogdan Khmelnitsky, 2nd class

Pyotr Grigoryevich Shafranov (Russian: Пётр Григорьевич Шафранов; 22 January [O.S. 9 January] 1901 – 4 November 1972) was a Soviet Army colonel general and Hero of the Soviet Union.

Drafted into the Red Army in 1919, Shafranov fought in the Russian Civil War as an infantryman. During the 1920s he became a junior commander in artillery units and served in artillery staff positions during the late 1930s. After the beginning of Operation Barbarossa, he was sent to command an artillery regiment and in late 1941 became commander of the artillery of the 249th Rifle Division, which became the 16th Guards Rifle Division. Shafranov commanded the latter between 1942 and 1943, the 36th Guards Rifle Corps from 1943 to 1944, the 5th Army for a brief period in late 1944, and the 31st Army from January 1945. For his leadership of the 31st Army in the East Prussian Offensive, Shafranov was made a Hero of the Soviet Union. Postwar, he served in command positions in the National Air Defense Forces and ended his career as representative of the Supreme Commander of the Unified Armed Forces of the Warsaw Treaty Organization to the Hungarian People's Republic, retiring in 1965.

== Early life, Russian Civil War, and interwar period ==
Shafranov was born on 22 January [O.S. 9 January] 1901 in the village of Bolshoye Frolovoye, Tetyushsky Uyezd, Kazan Governorate (now in Buinsky District, Tatarstan) to a peasant family. He attended primary school in Tetyushi and left for Tsaritsyn in 1914, where he worked until 1917 as a sailor and helmsman. During the Russian Civil War, he was drafted into the Red Army in October 1919 and was initially sent to the 4th Reserve Rifle Regiment in Kazan as a Red Army man. Shafranov was transferred to the 112th Rifle Regiment of the 13th Rifle Division, with which he fought on the Western Front against Latvian and Finnish troops. From July 1920, he served as a squad leader in the 131st Rifle Regiment of the 15th Rifle Division. With the latter, Shafranov fought against the Army of Wrangel in the Kakhovka bridgehead, the Northern Taurida Offensive, and the Perekop–Chongar Operation.

After the defeat of Wrangel, Shafranov became a Red Army man in a lettered company of the 15th Rifle Division in May 1921. Entering the 6th Saratov Artillery Courses in September 1921, he fought as a squad leader on the Turkestan Front against the Basmachi movement between May and November 1922 with a student detachment. Upon graduation from the courses in February 1923, Shafranov became a gun commander and assistant platoon commander in the artillery battalion of the 44th Rifle Division, stationed at Zhytomyr. He became a platoon commander and assistant battery commander in the 99th Artillery Regiment at Cherkasy in October of that year. Shafranov studied at the Kiev Artillery School from October 1926, before being transferred to the Sumy Artillery School, where he served as starshina of the cadet battery. Upon graduation in March 1928, he was sent to the 56th Artillery Regiment of the Leningrad Military District in Pskov, serving as a battery commander and head of the regimental school.

Shafranov studied at the F.E. Dzerzhinsky Military-Technical Academy of the Red Army (renamed the F.E. Dzerzhinsky Artillery Academy of the Red Army in 1932) from June 1930, and after graduation in November 1934 became an adjunct (graduate student) at the academy. From May 1935 he served in the Main Artillery Directorate of the Red Army as an engineer of the highest qualification before becoming a department head at the directorate in September 1937. Shafranov served as a head of a sector and department at the Defense Committee of the Council of People's Commissars from July 1938.

== World War II ==
After the beginning of Operation Barbarossa, the German invasion of the Soviet Union, in June 1941, Shafranov was given command of the 778th Artillery Regiment of the 247th Rifle Division of the 31st Army of the Reserve Front in July. From October he was chief of artillery of the 249th Rifle Division, fighting with the 22nd and 4th Shock Armies on the Kalinin and Northwestern Fronts. In fighting for Peno, Andreapol, Toropets, and Velizh during January and February 1942, Shafranov was credited with "skillfully organizing artillery-infantry cooperation and artillery fire support", for which he received the Order of the Red Banner on 31 January 1942. He continued in his position after the 249th was converted into the 16th Guards Rifle Division in March.

Shafranov, by this time a colonel, became commander of the division on 16 August, and was promoted to major general on 27 November. He led the division in defensive battles in the Staritsa area as part of the 30th Army of the Western Front until February 1943. During March, in the Rzhev–Vyazma Strategic Offensive, Shafranov, promoted to major general, "skillfully organized the breakthrough of forward enemy defenses" before the division crossed the Volga and captured Rzhev. Subsequently, with the 11th Guards Army of the Bryansk Front, he led the division in Operation Kutuzov and the battles for Karachev and Gorodok in mid-1943. For the "successful performance of combat missions" in Operation Kutuzov, Shafranov was awarded the Order of Kutuzov, 2nd class.

Appointed commander of the 36th Guards Rifle Corps in early September, Shafranov led the latter as part of the 11th Guards Army with the Bryansk, 2nd and 1st Baltic, and 3rd Belorussian Fronts during the offensives of 1943 and 1944. For his "skillful leadership" of the corps in the late June 1944 Vitebsk–Orsha Offensive of Operation Bagration, during which it made a flank maneuver and captured the rail junction of Orsha, he was awarded the Order of Bogdan Khmelnitsky, 2nd class. During the July Kaunas Offensive, the corps crossed the Neman and advanced 50 kilometres (31 miles) in three days, capturing Kalvarija. He was promoted to lieutenant general on 13 September.

Given command of the 5th Army of the 3rd Belorussian Front on 16 October, Shafranov transferred to command the 31st Army of the 1st Ukrainian Front on 15 December, leading the latter for the rest of the war. Under his command, the army fought in the East Prussian Offensive, capturing Schirwindt, Labiau, Wehlau, and Tapiau, which covered the approaches to Königsberg. Continuing the offensive, the army captured Heiligenbeil, the last German stronghold on the coast of the Frisches Haff to the south of Königsberg, and completed the destruction of the surrounded German troops in East Prussia during March. For his "skillful leadership", Shafranov was awarded the title Hero of the Soviet Union and the Order of Lenin on 19 April 1945. He ended the war in the Prague Offensive in early May.

== Postwar ==
After the end of the war, Shafranov continued to command the army. In August 1948, he graduated from Higher Academic Courses at the Voroshilov Higher Military Academy and became commander of the troops of the Donbass Air Defense Region. After successively commanding the Baku Air Defense Region from June 1952 and the Ural Air Defense Region from April 1954, Shafranov commanded the Ural Air Defense Army between 1954 and 1955, while simultaneously serving as deputy commander of the troops of the Ural Military District for air defense. From May 1955 he served as deputy commander of the troops of the Transcaucasian Military District for air defense before becoming head of the air defense department of the Voroshilov Higher Military Academy in July 1956. Transferred to become head of the Military Command Academy of the Air Defense Forces in December of that year, Shafranov was promoted to colonel general in 1958. He became chief military advisor to the Hungarian People's Army in November 1959. In August 1961 he became the representative of the Supreme Commander of the Unified Armed Forces of the Warsaw Treaty Organization to the Hungarian People's Republic, the last position held before his retirement in 1965. Shafranov lived in Moscow, where he died on 4 November 1972, being buried at the Novodevichy Cemetery. He was survived by a son and daughter.

== Awards and honors ==
Shafranov was a recipient of the following Soviet awards and decorations:

- Hero of the Soviet Union
- Order of Lenin (2)
- Order of the Red Banner (3)
- Order of Suvorov, 2nd class
- Order of Kutuzov, 2nd class
- Order of Bogdan Khmelnitsky, 2nd class

He was made an Honorary Commander of the Order of the British Empire in 1943 along with other Soviet senior officers; his neck decoration was presented by British Ambassador to the Soviet Union Archibald Clark Kerr to People's Commissar of Foreign Affairs Vyacheslav Molotov in a 10 May 1944 ceremony.

Shafranov was a delegate to the third convocation of the Supreme Soviet of the Soviet Union. A ship of the Ministry of the Maritime Fleet and a street in Buinsk were named for him.
