= 16th Guards Rifle Division =

- Major General Mikhail Pronin
- Founded: February 16, 1942
- Disbanded: September 1, 1960
- Country: Soviet Union
- Branch: Red Army; Soviet Army (after 1946)
- Type: Division
- Role: Infantry
- Engagements: World War II; Toropets–Kholm Offensive; Battles of Rzhev; First Rzhev–Sychyovka Offensive; Rzhev–Vyazma Offensive; Operation Kutuzov; Battle of Smolensk; Battle of Nevel; Vitebsk–Bogushevsk Offensive; Operation Bagration; Vitebsk–Orsha Offensive; Minsk Offensive; Vilnius-Kaunas Offensive; Goldap–Gumbinnen Operation; Vistula–Oder Offensive; East Prussian Offensive; Battle of Königsberg; Samland Offensive
- Decorations: Order of Lenin; Order of the Red Banner; Order of Suvorov
- Battle honours: Karachev

Commanders
- Notable commanders: German Fyodorovich Tarasov; Sergei Alekseevich Knyazkov; Pyotr Grigoryevich Shafranov; Efim Vasilevich Ryzhikov; Mikhail Andreevich Pronin

The 16th Guards Rifle Division was formed in February 1942 as an elite infantry formation based on a cadre from the 249th Rifle Division. It continued to serve in this capacity beyond the end of the Great Patriotic War.

It was redeployed while serving in the Kalinin Front, and it remained in the northern half of the front during the war. In the summer, it was assigned to the Western Front's 30th Army to the north of the Rzhev salient and took part in the long and costly struggle for the village of Polunino just east of that town in August. It returned to the fighting in March 1943 in the follow-up to the German evacuation of the salient and was then reassigned to the new 11th Guards Army, where it remained for the duration of the war.

During the summer offensive against the German-held salient around Oryol, it assisted in the liberation of Karachev and received its name as an honorific. By December, after fighting through western Russia, north of Smolensk, the division was in the 1st Baltic Front, attacking south towards Gorodok and winning the Order of the Red Banner in an ultimately unsuccessful effort to seize Vitebsk.

By the start of the offensive against Army Group Center in the summer of 1944, the 16th Guards had been redeployed with its Army to the south of Vitebsk as part of the 3rd Belorussian Front, where it would remain for the duration. Driving westward during Operation Bagration, the division helped to liberate the key city of Orsha and then drove on towards Minsk. With its Army, it advanced through Lithuania to the border with East Prussia, being further decorated with the Order of Suvorov for its crossing of the Neman River. As part of the East Prussian Offensive, the 16th Guards entered the heavily fortified region and helped gradually break the German resistance there, particularly at Insterburg and Königsberg, ending the fighting at Pillau.

The 16th Guards remained in the Kaliningrad Oblast well after the war, until it was finally disbanded in September 1960.

== Formation ==
The division, which had been recruited on the basis of a cadre from the NKVD internal troops, was officially raised to Guards status on February 16, 1942, in recognition of its role in the Toropets–Kholm Offensive, the annihilation of the German 189th Infantry Regiment at Okhvat in January, and the subsequent liberation of Toropets. Its sub-units would not receive their Guards redesignations until March 8. Its order of battle, based on the first wartime shtat (table of organization and equipment) for rifle divisions, was eventually as follows:

- 43rd Guards Rifle Regiment (from 917th Rifle Regiment)
- 46th Guards Rifle Regiment (from 921st Rifle Regiment)
- 49th Guards Rifle Regiment (from 925th Rifle Regiment)
- 44th Guards Artillery Regiment (from 779th Artillery Regiment)
- 21st Guards Antitank Battalion (from 307th Antitank Battalion)
- 408th Mortar Battalion (until March 4, 1942)
- 19th Guards Antiaircraft Battery (until March 10, 1943)
- 28th Guards Mortar Battalion (until October 16, 1942)
- 20th Guards Reconnaissance Company (later the 328th Reconnaissance Battalion)
- 23rd Guards Sapper Battalion
- 26th Guards Signal Battalion
- 22nd Guards Medical/Sanitation Battalion
- 18th Guards Chemical Defense (Anti-gas) Company
- 14th Guards Motor Transport Company
- 24th Guards Field Bakery
- 17th Guards Divisional Veterinary Hospital
- 812th Field Postal Station
- 383rd Field Office of the State Bank.

Major General German Tarasov, who had led the 249th Rifle Division since it had been formed in July 1941, remained in command. At the time it was redesignated, the division was in the 4th Shock Army of the Kalinin Front, where it remained until May, when it was moved to the Front reserves for much-needed rebuilding and replenishment. On March 16, the division received the Order of Lenin, which it had been recommended for while it was still the 249th. Tarasov was reassigned as acting commanding officer of the 24th Army on April 12; he went on over the next two-and-a-half years to serve as the first commander of the 70th Army, ultimately being demoted to deputy commander of the 53rd Army before being killed in action in Hungary in October 1944. Colonel Sergei Alekseevich Knyazkov took over command of the 16th Guards.

== Battles for Rzhev ==
At the beginning of July, the division was in the reserve 58th Army, and by the end of the month, it had been assigned to the 30th Army, both in the Kalinin Front. For the First Rzhev–Sychyovka Offensive Operation, the 30th Army was committed along with the 29th Army of its Front and two armies of the Western Front to break through the defenses of the German 9th Army north and east of Rzhev. The Kalinin Front's offensive began on July 30, with a powerful artillery preparation. The commander of the Front's artillery, Major General N. M. Khlebnikov, recalled:

The power of the fire attack was so great that after several tentative attempts to answer the fire, the German artillery fell silent. The two forward positions of the enemy's main defensive belt were smashed, and the troops occupying them were almost completely wiped out.

By the end of the first day, units of the 30th Army had broken through on a front of nine kilometers (5.6 mi) and to a depth of six to seven kilometers (3.7 to 4.3 mi). However, on the same day, heavy rains began, which continued for several days. Roads became quagmires and small streams widened to significant obstacles. Under these conditions, the Army's units became bogged down in bitter fighting in the area of Polunino, northeast of Rzhev, and its offensive ground to a halt.

Owing to adverse weather conditions, forces of the Western Front postponed their offensive until 4 August. When the operation commenced, it achieved immediate gains on both sides of the village of Pogoreloye Gorodishche. On the following day, Army General Georgy Zhukov was appointed overall commander of the two Fronts and proposed the liberation of Rzhev by the 30th and 31st Armies by August 9. However, Polunino was not captured until August 21, following combined attacks by the 16th Guards, 2nd Guards Motorized, and 52nd Rifle Division. These formations, having sustained heavy losses, then advanced to the outskirts of Rzhev. After limited regrouping, the 30th Army resumed the offensive at 05:30 on August 24. Over the next two days, it reached the Volga River five to six kilometers (3.1 to 3.7 mi) west of the city and forced a crossing on August 29, but was unable to go farther. On the same day, the Army was transferred to the Western Front. On September 30, the Army continued to attack, gradually gaining several blocks in the northeast sector of the city before finally going over to the defense on October 1. In the course of the fighting through August and September, it suffered total personnel losses of 99,820 to gain 10 kilometers (6 mi) on its right flank and 20 kilometers (12 mi) on its left.

During the offensive, on August 15, Colonel Knyazkov left command of the division, soon taking over the 28th Rifle Division. Colonel Pyotr Shafranov was reassigned from command of the 44th Guards Artillery Regiment to command of the division the following day; he would be promoted to the rank of major general on November 27. The 30th Army played a supporting role only during Operation Mars as it recovered from the summer's bloodletting. In January 1943, the division was moved to the reserves of the Western Front for further rebuilding, and in February, it was assigned to the 50th Army in the same Front, but considerably farther to the south. On March 1, the 9th Army began Operation Büffel, the phased evacuation of the Rzhev salient; the 50th Army played only a limited role in the pursuit, being located near the base of the salient. Its history recounted:

The 50th Army's formations reached the enemy's main defensive belt on 17 March, where they encountered stiff resistance. Attempts to penetrate [the German defenses] failed in spite of the commitment of the second echelon... The army's forces went over to the defense along a line northeast and east of Spas-Demensk on April 1.

Prior to this date, the 16th Guards had been again transferred, now to the 33rd Army, still in the Western Front.

== Into Western Russia ==
In April, the division was shuffled once again, now to the 16th Guards Rifle Corps of the 16th Army, in the Western Front. It would remain in this Army (and its successor, the 11th Guards Army) for the duration of the war. Before the German offensive at Kursk had ended, the Bryansk and Western Fronts began an offensive against the northeastern flank of the German-held salient around Oryol on July 12. The 11th Guards Army achieved a deep penetration at the boundary between the German 211th and 293rd Infantry Divisions. The Army commander, Lieutenant General Ivan Bagramyan, committed his mobile forces in the afternoon and advanced about 10–12 kilometers (6–7 mi). Army Group Center hurriedly brought up the 5th Panzer Division to mount a counterattack in the evening, which was unsuccessful.

The next morning, the 5th Panzer launched a new attack before sunrise. More than half of its tanks and panzer grenadiers attacked over a commanding height and ran into the 16th Guards Corps, which was itself preparing for an attack with strong tank support. The German armor, driving eastward, was blinded by the rising sun and did not see the Soviet tanks and guns until they were at very close range. Within a short time, the German attack was decimated, with 45 tanks completely destroyed. The 16th Guards Corps soon began its own attack, which inflicted heavy losses on the 14th Panzergrenadier Regiment. For the 5th Panzer, this became the "blackest day of the entire Russian Campaign."

On August 15, both the 16th Guards Corps and the 16th Guards Division were among the units recognized by the Supreme High Command for their roles in the liberation of Karachev, and the division was one of four that were awarded its name as an honorific. As early as mid-July, the main forces of the Western Front were preparing for its summer offensive, Operation Suvorov, the timing of which depended in part on the progress of 11th Guards Army in Kutuzov. Ideally, the right flank of Army Group Center would be destabilized and in retreat after evacuating the Oryol salient, but in the event it consolidated along the Hagen line at its base.

On July 30, the 11th Guards Army was transferred to Bryansk Front and advanced towards the Front's namesake city through August and September. On September 1, General Shafranov handed his command over to Major General Efim Vasilevich Ryzhikov. When the Front was disbanded on October 10, the Army accompanied its headquarters northwest to the area east of Velikiye Luki. The headquarters was used to establish the Baltic Front (2nd Baltic Front as of October 20), and the Army remained under its command. At noon on November 18, the Army was reassigned to the 1st Baltic Front.

Given the complex situation in the Nevel region, where the 3rd and 4th Shock Armies had carved out a large salient behind the lines of the German 16th Army (Army Group North) and the 3rd Panzer Army (Army Group Center), Colonel General Bagramyan, who now commanded the Front, planned an attack along the Gorodok–Vitebsk axis with the 11th Guards Army. Five divisions were concentrated on an eight-kilometer-long (5.0 mi) sector with the 16th and 36th Guards Rifle Corps delivering the main attack. The 16th Guards Corps had two divisions in first echelon and one in the second. In the event, the STAVKA delayed the start of the offensive until November 26, but an unseasonal thaw forced a further delay into early December.

=== Battle for Gorodok ===
It was not until December 13 that the ground had firmed enough to finally resume the offensive on Gorodok. By now, the 16th Guards Division had been transferred to 36th Guards Corps. The Corps was on the east side of the apex of the salient held by the 3rd Panzer Army, due south of Lake Ezerische, with all three divisions (16th, 84th Guards, and 360th Rifle) in first echelon.

The plan was effectively the same as it had been on November 26. They faced the German IX Army Corps' 129th Infantry and 6th Luftwaffe Field Divisions. The offensive began after a two-hour artillery preparation without air support due to poor flying weather. Of the Corps' three divisions, only the 84th Guards was able to penetrate the Germans' first defensive positions on the first day of the assault. By contrast, the 16th Guards managed an advance of only 400–600 meters (1,312–1,969 ft) before being halted by heavy German fire. A regrouping followed, which brought reinforcements into 84th Guards' sector, which broke through the next morning. Following this success, the 16th Guards Division expanded the penetration toward Laptevka and Surmino in the rear of the German 87th Infantry Division, which was also being pressed eastward by elements of the 4th Shock Army. By early on the 15th, that division, along with part of the 129th, had been completely encircled by the advance forces of the two Soviet armies. The remnants of the pocketed units struggled to escape to the southwest over the next 24 hours; some did, but many did not.

While much of the 11th Guards Army spent December 17–18 reducing the German pocket, the 36th Guards Corps advanced six to eight kilometers (3.7 to 5.0 mi) south towards hastily erected defenses held by the remaining forces of the 20th Panzer, 252nd and 129th Infantry, and 6th Luftwaffe Field Divisions. This line was soon overcome and Gorodok was finally liberated on December 24. Three days earlier, the 16th Guards Division had been recognized for its successes in the earlier stages of the offensive with the award of the Order of the Red Banner.

=== Vitebsk–Bogushevsk Offensive ===
Gorodok was only intended as an intermediate objective on the road to Vitebsk. On January 6, 1944, the 1st Baltic Front began a new offensive with the 11th Guards and 4th Shock Armies from the northwest in the direction of that city. Lieutenant General Kuzma Galitsky, the 11th Guards commander, designated the 16th and 36th Guards Corps as the Army's shock groups, which were to penetrate the defenses of the German LIII Army Corps in the Mashkina and Lake Zaronovskoe sector before advancing on Vitebsk north of the Sorotino–Vitebsk road. By this time, all of Galitsky's divisions averaged roughly 4,500–5,000 personnel each, considerably understrength. Following a short but intense artillery preparation, the 36th Guards Corps, supported by a tank brigade, made little progress. General Galitsky later described the struggle of the 16th Guards for the German strongpoint at the village of Kukhori as an example of the frustrating fighting during this offensive:

This small village, which was located on the high ground, dominated the terrain. The enemy fitted out the stone houses that predominated here with pillboxes and prepared them for all-round defense. Full-profile trenches connected by communications trenches were dug out of the outskirts of the village... Three networks of barbed wire entanglements were stretched 30–40 metres in front of the trenches. Many layers of machine gun and automatic weapons fire crisscrossed any point on the approaches to the village. The garrison of Kukhori consisted of 2–3 companies, numbering 80–100 men, armed with 8–9 heavy machine guns, 10–12 light machine guns, several antitank rifles, 2 assault guns, and also a battery of mortars. In addition, the garrison was supported by fire from no fewer than three artillery and three mortar batteries firing from the depths.

A full rifle regiment of the division assaulted the strongpoint twice between January 9 and 11, but even with support of a sapper company and heavy artillery fire, failed to dislodge the defenders. General Ryzhikov then decided to use a specially selected assault detachment in a night attack. This was formed from a battalion of the 43rd Guards Regiment, supported by a reinforced reconnaissance company and sappers, subdivided into several assault groups, each with a specific objective. The attack began at 02:00 on January 14, from two directions. Its suddenness preempted German artillery support and the village was taken by 06:00. Despite this minor success, Galitsky's Army had advanced only one to two kilometers (0.62 to 1.24 mi) by this date. The STAVKA insisted that the assaults continue until finally calling a halt on January 24.

The offensive was resumed on February 2. Galitsky formed his shock group from the 8th and 36th Guards Corps, backed by the 1st Tank Corps and facing the 87th Infantry Division, plus battlegroups from the 20th Panzer and the 201st Security Divisions from Mashkina, southward past Lake Zaronovskoe to Gorbachi. After an extensive artillery preparation, the shock group quickly overcame the forward defenses of the 87th Infantry, and in two days of fighting, advanced up to three and a half kilometers (2 mi). The 16th and 84th Guards Divisions reached the western outskirts of Kisliaki and captured the German strongpoint at Gorodishche on the north shore of Lake Zaronovskoe. The LIII Corps withdrew the battered 87th Infantry and replaced it with the far stronger Group Breidenbach from the 20th Panzer. By the end of February 3, the shock group had made enough progress that General Bagramyan released the 26th Guards Rifle Division from 36th Guards Corps' second echelon, while the 1st Tank Corps went into action the next morning. The tanks attacked along the Kozly and Mikhali axis at dawn, and in two days of heavy fighting with the help of their supporting riflemen, managed to advance another four kilometers (2.5 mi), taking Kozly and Novoselki before being halted by the 20th Panzer. The attackers were now just 15 kilometers (9 mi) northwest of downtown Vitebsk.

By the end of February 5, although the LIII Corps had lost considerable territory north of the Vitebsk–Sirotino road, its defenses were firming up. To deal with this, Bagramyan ordered Galitsky to redirect the 16th and 36th Guards Corps to the south. After a brief regrouping, the attack began again on February 7, but the 36th Corps made no notable progress before the offensive was halted on February 16. By now, the 1st Tank Corps had fewer than 10 tanks serviceable, the rifle divisions of the 11th Guards Army numbered fewer than 3,000 personnel each due to nearly constant combat since mid-fall, and they had used up most of their ammunition. The next day, Bagramyan was ordered to withdraw the Army for rest and refitting, with the intention to commit it against Army Group North, which was falling back from Leningrad. In the event, after a period in the Reserve of the Supreme High Command it was reassigned to 3rd Belorussian Front in May. The 16th Guards would remain in this Front for the duration. On April 27, Ryzhikov was briefly replaced in command by Lieutenant Colonel Vasily Vasilevich Kilkhanidze, but returned to his post on May 22.

== Operation Bagration ==
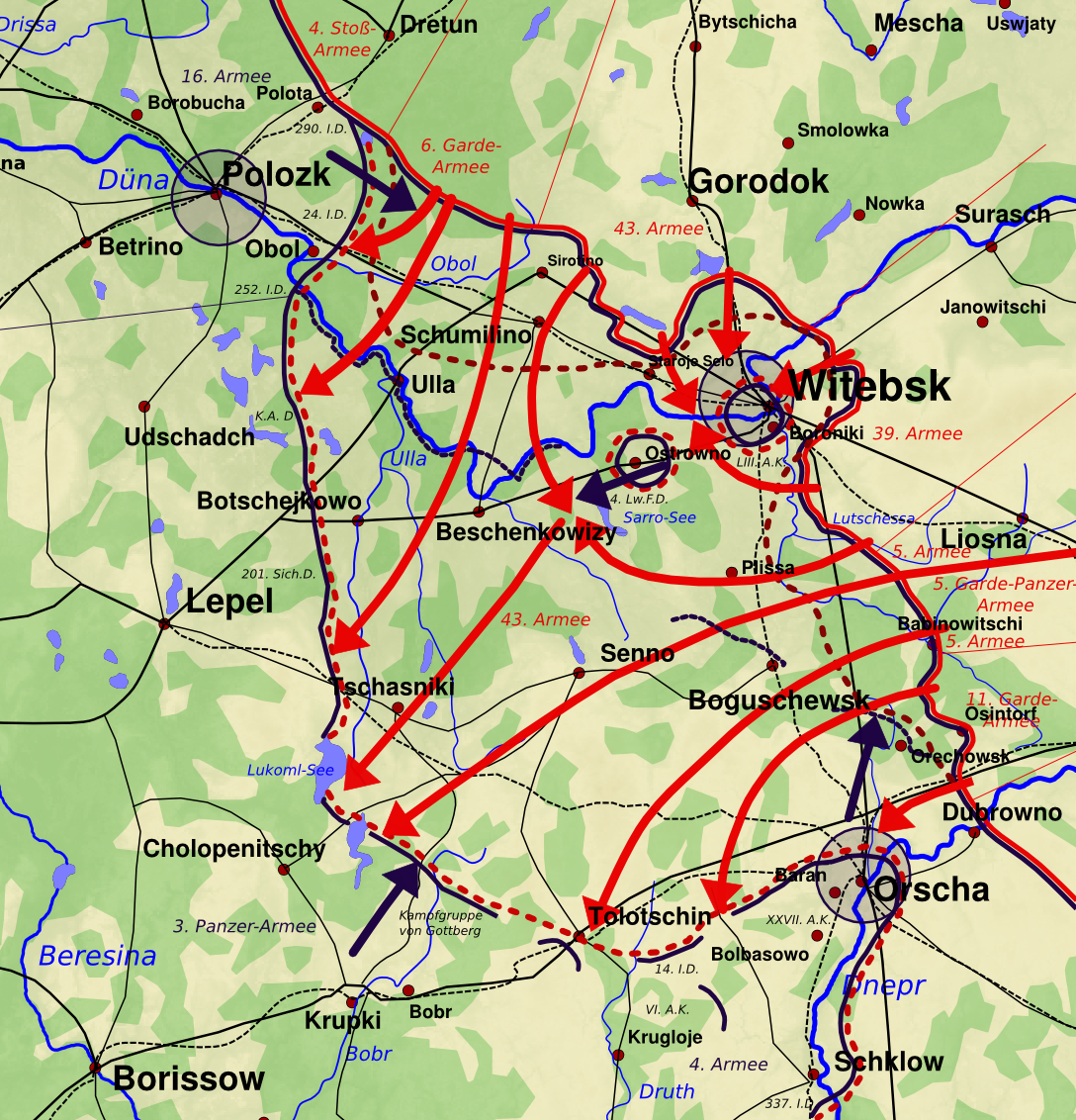
Vitebsk–Orsha Offensive, June 23–28, 1944

In the buildup to the summer offensive against Army Group Center, the 11th Guards Army trained intensively in the forests in the Nevel region and received over 20,000 replacements, bringing the 16th Guards and the rest of its rifle divisions to an average of 7,200 personnel each. Beginning on May 25, the Army moved up well behind the front of 3rd Belorussian, followed by a secret move of 300 kilometers (186 mi) on June 12–13 to a sector north of the Dniepr River 30 kilometers (19 mi) northeast of Orsha, replacing elements of 31st Army. General Galitsky screened most of his sector with the 16th Guards Corps, while the 8th and 36th Corps concentrated on a narrow sector adjacent to the 31st Army. On June 22, the 36th Corps was crammed into less than 10 kilometers (6 mi) with the 8th Corps and had two heavy tank regiments and two assault gun regiments attached. It faced elements of the XXVII Army Corps of the German 4th Army, primarily the 78th Assault Division.

General Galitsky decided to launch his main attack along the highway to Minsk, on a sector from Ostrov Yurev to Kirieva. The immediate objective was to break through the German defense and pave the way for the 2nd Guards Tank Corps to seize the line of the Orshitsa River by the end of the first day. The 36th Guards Corps, on the Army's left flank, would attack the sector from Slepin to Kirieva towards Shalashino to reach just outside Makarovo.

Along with the other first-echelon divisions of its Front, the 16th Guards prepared a forward battalion to take part in a reconnaissance in force which was conducted through the afternoon and evening of June 22, supported by a 25-minute artillery preparation. While the main purpose of this reconnaissance was to uncover the German fire system, seizing their forward defenses was a secondary goal. While the battalions of the 5th Army to the north had considerable success in this regard, within the 11th Guards Army, only the battalions of the division and the 31st Guards Rifle Division were able to consolidate the first German trench line.

Following an intensive artillery and airstrike preparation, the Front's main offensive began at 09:00 on June 23. The 8th and 36th Guards Corps encountered fierce resistance from the 78th Assault Division and other German units and through the day only advanced two kilometers (1.2 mi). As a result, the 2nd Guards Tanks remained in its jumping-off positions. At 08:50 on June 24, following a 40-minute artillery preparation, the 11th Guards Army resumed its offensive. While 8th and 16th Guards Corps advanced as much as 14 kilometers (9 mi) during the day, the 36th Corps had still not cleared a path for the commitment of the 2nd Guards Tanks. The next day, the Army focused its efforts on the sector of 16th Corps, which threw the German forces back another 7–12 kilometers (4.3–7.5 mi) and was by now deeply outflanking Orsha from the north. On June 26, as the leading Corps of 11th Guards attacked towards Borisov to prevent the 4th Army from withdrawing across the Berezina River, the 36th Corps prepared to capture Orsha in conjunction with the 31st Army. The Corps began fighting in the northern and western outskirts in the late evening, and after stubborn, fighting the city was completely cleared by 07:00 on June 27. The 16th Guards Division was among the units given special recognition for the liberation of Orsha.

=== Minsk Offensive ===
By now, the 36th Corps was 35 to 40 kilometers (22 to 25 mi) in the rear of the rest of the 11th Guards Army, and it spent the next few days catching up. The STAVKA directed the 3rd Belorussian Front to make the main attack in the direction of Minsk with the 11th Guards and the 31st and 5th Guards Tank Armies. On June 29, the main body of the 11th Guards advanced 30 kilometers (19 mi), closing to within 22 to 28 kilometers (14 to 17 mi) of the Berezina, while the 36th Corps covered up to 40 kilometers (25 mi) pursuing rapidly retreating German forces. The Army advanced decisively across the river on July 1, throwing the defenders 25 to 30 kilometers (16 to 19 mi) to the west. By the end of the next day, the entire 11th Guards had consolidated along a line from Lishitsy to Logoisk to Sarnatsk to Smolevichi. Minsk was liberated on the morning of July 3, primarily by units of 31st Army. On the same day, 11th Guards advanced 30 to 35 kilometers (19 to 22 mi) and took Radashkovichy.

=== Vilnius–Kaunas Offensive ===
On July 5, after liberating Molodechno, the main forces of the 11th Guards Army pushed on towards the Neman River, which they reached and crossed the next day before running into the German defenses of the "East Wall" and being halted. This line was cracked by a deliberate attack beginning at midday on July 7, despite German tank ambushes and heavy counterattacks. On July 8, the leading units of the Army advanced another 25 to 30 kilometers (16 to 19 mi) and by now were approaching Vilnius, which held a garrison of about 15,000 men. While the battle for this city went on until the 13th, forward detachments of the 5th Guards Tank reached the Neman River, followed by the left flank and center forces of the Front. The 11th Guards faced the relatively fresh 131st Infantry Division in the Rudiskes area.

By the end of July 15, the Army, in cooperation with the 5th Army, had seized a bridgehead 28 kilometers (17 mi) long and two to six kilometers (1.2 to 3.7 mi) deep, while it also was maintaining a second bridgehead up to six kilometers (3.7 mi) deep. These continued to expand in fighting through to the 20th while repelling German counterattacks, at which point the Front went over to a temporary defense. A further advance began on July 29, which gained 10–15 kilometers (6–9 mi). Kaunas was taken by the 5th Army on August 1, and German forces continued falling back to the west. By now, the 16th Guards had only two companies in each rifle battalion, and each company averaged 25–30 men. In addition, the 44th Guards Artillery was lagging behind. On August 12, the division was awarded the Order of Suvorov, 2nd Degree, for its part in the forcing of the Neman. On the 20th, General Ryzhikov handed his command to Major General Georgy Andrianovich Vasilev, but returned to his post on September 4.

== Into Germany ==
On October 16, General Ryzhikov permanently left the division, now to become acting commander, and later deputy commander, of the 36th Guards Corps. He was succeeded by Major General Mikhail Andreevich Pronin. On the same day, the division, along with the rest of the 11th Guards, began attacking into East Prussia as part of the Front's abortive Goldap–Gumbinnen Operation, which ended in early November. In the planning for the Vistula–Oder Offensive, the 11th Guards Army began in the second echelon of 3rd Belorussian Front, on a sector from Kybartai to Kaukern on the right and Millunen to Georgenburg on the left. The intermediate objective was to capture Insterburg by the end of the fifth day in cooperation with 28th Army. The offensive against East Prussia began on January 13, 1945; on January 21, the Front commander, Army General Ivan Chernyakhovsky, decided to use his 11th Guards, 5th and 28th Armies to encircle and eliminate the German Insterburg–Gumbinnen group of forces, with the objective of pursuing and advancing directly on Königsberg. Chernyakhovsky assigned the 11th Guards and 5th Armies to encircle Insterburg and capture it on January 22.

General Galitsky chose to attack the town at night with the 36th Guards Corps, to break into the town from the north and destroy the German garrison (remnants of the 1st, 56th, and 349th Infantry Divisions with tanks from the 5th Panzer Division) in cooperation with 5th Army's 72nd Rifle Corps from the northeast and east. The 36th Guards Corps carried out a regrouping and attacked at 23:00 on January 21, following a 20-minute artillery preparation; it was met by powerful machine gun and mortar fire and frenzied counterattacks. German units covering the road intersections north of the town held on with particular stubbornness. Units of the 16th Guards Division were counterattacked six times and forced to slow the pace of their advance. In response, the Corps commander, Lieutenant General Pyotr Koshevoy, committed the 84th Guards Division from second echelon, and at 01:00 on January 22, its regiments broke through the defense.

Facing encirclement, most of the German forces began falling back to the south with the 16th and 18th Guards in pursuit to the Instruch River. After failing to blow the bridges, the German troops fell back in disorder into the town, closely followed by the two Guards divisions. Once there, the German forces once again put up stubborn resistance. Despite this, the supporting 75th Tank Regiment, mounted with sub-machine gunners, broke into Insterburg at 02:30, and its gains were soon consolidated by the attacking guardsmen. Fierce street fighting, lit by burning buildings, broke out through the entire northern outskirts of the town. Suffering heavy losses from direct artillery and automatic weapons fire, the garrison fell back to the town's center as the 72nd Corps entered the fray. By 06:00, Insterburg was completely cleared. On February 19, the 46th and 49th Guards Rifle Regiments would be decorated with the Order of the Red Banner for their roles in the taking of this town, while the 44th Guards Artillery Regiment would receive the Order of Kutuzov, 3rd Degree.

=== Battle of Königsberg ===
Also on January 22, the remainder of the 11th Guards Army reached the Kurisches Haff, along with elements of 43rd and 39th Armies, before developing its attack to the southwest and forcing the Pregel River. On January 30, the 16th Guards Corps reached the Frisches Haff, cutting off the German Königsberg grouping from the south while the 8th and 36th Guards Corps attacked some of the city's fortifications from the march and captured several permanent concrete structures. However, a powerful counterattack by elements of Panzergrenadier Division Großdeutschland against the 16th Corps soon restored communications with the fortress. On February 9, these three Soviet armies operating close to Königsberg were transferred to 1st Baltic Front, while 3rd Belorussian focused on eliminating the large group of German forces in the western regions of East Prussia. As of February 24, the 1st Baltic was redesignated as the Zemland Group of Forces with the three armies and 3rd Air Army under command, now back as part of 3rd Belorussian Front.

Before Königsberg could be reduced, it was necessary to isolate it again. For this offensive, the 11th Guards Army was detached from the Zemland Group. On March 13, the attack to the southwest began, following a 40-minute artillery preparation. The German forces put up particularly fierce resistance against the Army, which was attacking in the direction of Brandenburg. Its left flank was able to advance two to three kilometers (1.2 to 1.9 mi), and the attack continued into the night and the following day through dense fog. On March 15, the 36th Guards Corps captured Wangitt on the Frisches Haff, again cutting communications with the city, and three days later helped to take the strongpoint of Ludwigsort. By March 26, the 11th Guards was mopping up German remnants and preparing to return to the Zemland Group.

When the assault on Königsberg began on April 6, the 11th Guards was responsible for the attack from the south, with the 36th Guards Corps on the left flank, closest to the Frisches Haff. The German garrison numbered more than 100,000 men, with 850 guns and up to 60 tanks and assault guns. For the attack, the Army was reinforced with the 23rd Tank Brigade, three self-propelled artillery regiments, a Guards heavy tank regiment, the 10th Artillery Division, and many other artillery units. It faced the German 69th Infantry Division.

On the first day, after a 90-minute artillery bombardment, the attack went in at noon. The 36th and 16th Guards Corps made the most progress, penetrating four kilometers (2.5 mi) into the German defenses, blockading two forts, clearing 43 city blocks, and beginning fighting for the railway station. On April 7, the Army continued fighting for the city's railroad junction, now assisted by heavy airstrikes. By the end of the day, it had captured two forts and the suburbs of Zeligenfeld, Speihersdorf, and Ponart. On the afternoon of April 8, it forced the Pregel to the northwest of Ponart and linked up with the 43rd Army, cutting off the fortress from the forces of the German Samland Group and also capturing the port area. Over the following day, German resistance slackened and by its end Königsberg had officially capitulated.

During the assault on Königsberg, the 16th Guards Division was credited with 8,000 German officers and men killed or captured, plus 86 guns and 10 tanks as trophies. On April 19, General Pronin would be named as a Hero of the Soviet Union. In the Samland offensive that followed beginning on April 13, the 11th Guards Army was initially in the Zemland Group's second echelon. It was committed into the first line overnight on April 17–18, relieving the 2nd Guards Army on the Vistula Spit, facing the heavily fortified town of Pillau. After reconnaissance over the next two days, the 16th and 36th Guards Corps attacked at 11:00 on April 20, but made little progress, which did not change the following day. On April 22, after the 8th Guards Corps was brought in as reinforcements, the German defense began to crack. During this fighting, Pronin was wounded, and his command was taken over by Major General Georgy Petrovich Isakov. Pillau finally fell on April 25.

== Postwar ==
After the war, the division carried the full title of 16th Guards Rifle, Karachev, Order of Lenin, Order of the Red Banner, Order of Suvorov Division. On May 17, in recognition of their services in the battle for Königsberg, the 43rd Guards Rifle Regiment was awarded the Order of Suvorov, 3rd Degree, the 46th and 49th Guards Rifle Regiments each received the Order of Kutuzov, 3rd Degree, and the 44th Guards Artillery Regiment was decorated with the Order of Aleksandr Nevsky. General Pronin took over command of the 36th Guards Corps in June, and was also the military commander of Königsberg.

After the end of the war, the division remained with the 11th Guards Army at Chernyakhovsk (formerly Insterburg). By February 1946, it had been transferred to the 8th Guards Rifle Corps. The 16th Guards Division returned to the 16th Guards Rifle Corps in late 1946, after the 8th Guards Rifle Corps headquarters was transferred to become an airborne corps. It remained with the 16th Guards Rifle Corps until the disbandment of the latter headquarters in 1957. It became the 16th Guards Motor Rifle Division on June 25, 1957, directly controlled by the 11th Guards Army headquarters, before being disbanded on September 1, 1960.
