= Mikhail Pronin =

Soviet army major general

Mikhail Andreyevich Pronin
- Born: 1 October 1892; Oryol, Russian Empire
- Died: 26 November 1978 (aged 86) Moscow, Soviet Union
- Allegiance: Russian Empire; Russian SFSR; Soviet Union
- Branch: Imperial Russian Army; Red Army (later Soviet Army)
- Service years: 1914–1917; 1918–1949
- Rank: Major general
- Commands: 144th Rifle Division; 352nd Rifle Division; 344th Rifle Division; 65th Rifle Corps; 16th Guards Rifle Division; 36th Guards Rifle Corps; 5th Guards Rifle Division
- Conflicts: World War I; Russian Civil War; World War II
- Awards: Hero of the Soviet Union; Order of Lenin (2); Order of the Red Banner (3); Order of Kutuzov, 2nd class

Mikhail Andreyevich Pronin (Russian: Михаил Андреевич Пронин; 1 October 1892 – 26 November 1978) was a Soviet Army major general and a Hero of the Soviet Union.

Pronin served as a sapper in the Imperial Russian Army during World War I and was drafted into the Red Army during the Russian Civil War, serving in artillery units. Between the wars, he held various staff positions in artillery and later infantry units, rising to regimental and then division command in the late 1930s. Pronin commanded the 144th Rifle Division for two years after Operation Barbarossa began and was demoted in mid-1942 to brigade command, then tried for incompetence. He returned to brigade command after the case was dropped later that year. During 1943, Pronin commanded two divisions and a corps and spent much of 1944 away from the front due to illness and further military education. In late 1944 he returned to the front and became commander of the 16th Guards Rifle Division, being made a Hero of the Soviet Union for his leadership of it in the Battle of Königsberg. Postwar, he held corps and division command before retiring in the late 1940s.

== Early life, World War I, and Russian Civil War ==
Mikhail Andreyevich Pronin was born on 1 October 1892 in Oryol, the son of a worker, and graduated from a four-grade city primary school. He was mobilized for service in the Imperial Russian Army during World War I on 28 July 1914. Pronin was assigned to the 9th Militia Sapper Half-Company at Oryol, and fought with it on the Western Front as a ryadovoy and junior unter-ofitser. From March 1915 he served as a junior unter-ofitser with the 3rd Sapper Battalion of the Western Front. For his actions during this period, Pronin was awarded two Crosses of St. George. Transferred to a reserve regiment at Rzhev in December 1916, Pronin was sent to become a junker at the Gori School of Praporshchiks. Graduating from an accelerated course there in April 1917 as a praporshchik, he was assigned to the 8th Siberian Reserve Rifle Regiment of the Turkestan Military District, serving as a junior officer and company commander. He was sent on leave in December, but did not return to his unit. From March 1918 he worked as a bread card registration instructor at the Oryol Governorate Military Commissariat.

During the Russian Civil War, Pronin was called up by the Red Army on 20 June 1918 and appointed a vsevobuch instructor and organizer for the Karachevsky Uyezd Military Commissariat. He served as head of the vsevobuch department and as an inspector of the Staroselsky volost Military Commissariat from July of that year, and in April 1919 became a platoon commander with the light artillery park of the 4th Rifle Division. He fought on the Eastern Front as head of communications, then as adjutant of the 3rd Artillery Battalion of the 36th Rifle Division (later redesignated as the 1st Light Artillery Battalion of the Eastern Front) from June. He fought in battles against the White forces of Alexander Kolchak. From November he served as head of communications of the training battery of the Higher Military School of the Reserve Army of the Republic at Kazan. Heavily wounded in battles in February 1920, he was evacuated to a hospital and upon recovery held in reserve at the Bryansk Governorate Military Commissariat.

== Interwar period ==
Pronin served as a senior instructor for temporarily assigned personnel of the 4th Light Battery from September, then as head of communications with a battery of the 2nd Consolidated Artillery Battalion of the Oryol Military District at Karachev. He was treated for illness at the Oryol Hospital between January and April 1921, then served on the staff of the district as a clerk of the procurement commission and clerk of the military horse service. He became head of communications of a battery of the Consolidated Heavy Artillery Battalion at Karachev in September, and from April 1922 as adjutant with the 2nd Light Artillery Battalion at Bryansk. Pronin served with the 6th Rifle Division of the Moscow Military District at Oryol as adjutant of the 1st Light Artillery Battalion, head of communications of the 6th Artillery Regiment, and assistant head of the operational section of the division staff.

He transferred to the 55th Rifle Division at Kursk in October 1926, serving assistant head of the operational section of the division staff and as a battalion commander of its 163rd Rifle Regiment. Pronin graduated from the Vystrel course in 1929, and in May 1933 became chief of staff of the 57th Rifle Regiment of the 19th Rifle Division of the Moscow Military District at Ostrogozhsk. He became commander of the 175th Rifle Regiment of the 1st Moscow Proletarian Rifle Division in July 1937 and commanded the 144th Rifle Division from 14 August 1939 with the rank of kombrig. Pronin received the rank of major general on 4 June 1940 when the Red Army modified its rank system.

== World War II ==
When Operation Barbarossa began in June 1941, Pronin was still commanding the 144th. He led the division as part of the 20th Army of the Western Front in the first Battle of Smolensk and the Vyazma Defensive Operation against Operation Typhoon. During the latter, the division was surrounded and suffered heavy losses, but managed to break out. As part of the 5th Army, it helped stop the German advance on the line of Zvenigorod, Kubinka, and Akulovo. During the counteroffensive near Moscow during the Battle of Moscow, the division helped recapture Mozhaysk and reached a line near Gzhatsk, which it defended. Due to "blunders in defensive organization", Pronin was relieved of command in July 1942 and appointed commander of the 123rd Separate Rifle Brigade of the 16th Army of the front, which fought in defensive battles against the German 2nd Panzer Army. For "neglecting his duties" and "losing control of the brigade in battle", Pronin was again relieved and put on trial. The Military Collegium of the Supreme Court of the Soviet Union dropped the case on 20 November and he was made commander of the 35th Separate Rifle Brigade of the 29th Army of the front.

Pronin commanded the 352nd Rifle Division from February 1943, which fought in the Rzhev–Vyazma Offensive, recapturing Gzhatsk and Vyazma. He was transferred to command the 344th Rifle Division of the 49th Army in June. He served as commander of the 65th Rifle Corps from 25 July, leading it in the second Battle of Smolensk as part of the 33rd Army. The corps was withdrawn to the front reserve for rebuilding in early December, then fought in attacks towards Vitebsk and Bogushevsk. Pronin was hospitalized due to illness between 4 January and 1 February 1944, then underwent retraining at the Higher Commanders' Improvement Courses (KUVNAS) at the Voroshilov Higher Military Academy. In mid-August, he was placed at the disposal of the military council of the 3rd Belorussian Front, then served as deputy commander of the 16th Guards Rifle Corps from 30 August.

Pronin took command of the 16th Guards Rifle Division of the 36th Guards Rifle Corps on 19 October. He led the division in the Samland Offensive as part of the 11th Guards Army of the front, and in the capture of Insterburg and Pillau. In April 1945, the division broke through the outer line of the Königsberg fortifications, reached the Frisches Haff, and was the first to cross the Pregolya River, cutting off the German retreat after linking up with the 43rd Army. Pronin was wounded on 27 April and was hospitalized for the rest of the war. For his "heroism and courage, in addition to military skills", Pronin was made a Hero of the Soviet Union and awarded the Order of Lenin on 19 April.

== Postwar ==
At the end of May 1945, Pronin was appointed commander of the 36th Guards Rifle Corps as part of the Special Military District at Königsberg, and from June he served as military commandant of the city and Königsberg fortress. Briefly serving as deputy commander for the fortified areas of the 11th Guards Army in the Baltic Military District from March 1946, he became commander of the 5th Guards Rifle Division a month later. Pronin became deputy commander of the 2nd Guards Rifle Corps in May 1947, his last assignment before retiring on 14 May 1949. He died in Moscow on 26 November 1978, and was buried in the Khimki cemetery.

== Awards and honors ==
Pronin received the following awards and decorations:

- Hero of the Soviet Union
- Order of Lenin (2)
- Order of the Red Banner (3)
- Order of Kutuzov, 2nd class
- Cross of St. George, 3rd and 4th class (not worn after 1917)
