= 247th Rifle Division =

247th Rifle Division (June 29, 1941 – October 14, 1941) 247th Rifle Division (December 20, 1941 – July, 1945)
- Active: 1941–1945
- Country: Soviet Union
- Branch: Red Army
- Type: Infantry
- Size: Division
- Engagements: Battle of Moscow; Battles of Rzhev; Operation Mars; Zhizdra Offensive; Battle of Smolensk (1943); Orsha offensives (1943); Operation Bagration; Lublin–Brest offensive Vistula-Oder offensive Battle of Berlin
- Decorations: Order of the Red Banner (2nd Formation)
- Battle honours: Roslavl (2nd Formation)

Commanders
- Notable commanders: Col. Sergei Pavlovich Tarasov; Maj. Gen. Grigorii Denisovich Mukhin

The 247th Rifle Division was the fourth of a group of 10 regular rifle divisions formed from cadres of NKVD border and internal troops as standard Red Army rifle divisions, very shortly after the German invasion, in the Moscow Military District. It was largely based on what would become the shtat (table of organization and equipment) of July 29, 1941, with several variations. It was assigned to 31st Army, where it remained throughout its existence. As part of Reserve Front, the division, with its Army, was mostly involved in constructing rear-area defenses until the start of Operation Typhoon, becoming encircled in early October. Many of those who survived the breakout were incorporated into the 250th Rifle Division and the 247th was disbanded.

A new 247th began forming on December 20 in the Moscow Military District, based on a separate motorized rifle brigade and a cadre of survivors of the 1st formation. After gradually being brought up to strength in 31st Army it took part in the desperate fighting on the east side of the Rzhev salient, in that Army in the summer and in 20th Army in November and December. At the start of that Army's drive across the Vazuza River on November 25 the division was the only one to attain its initial objectives; the failure of the remainder doomed the offensive on this sector and also soon led to very high casualties to the 247th. Soon after this offensive was shut down the division was transferred to 16th Army and took part in an abortive offensive toward Zhizdra, after which it was rebuilt for the summer offensive against Army Group Center. During this it won a battle honor, but in October became bogged down in the extensive fighting for Orsha, which continued into early 1944. It was withdrawn into the reserve and returned to the front as part of 61st Rifle Corps of 69th Army, where it remained for the duration. In the later stage of Operation Bagration it helped seize and hold a bridgehead over the Vistula River at Puławy and held there in the face of many German counterattacks. In January, 1945 the division broke out from there and advanced through western Poland into Germany. In the final battles for the German capital the 247th took part in the fighting that liquidated the German 9th Army and was rewarded with the Order of the Red Banner. Within weeks it was disbanded.

== 1st Formation ==
The 247th Rifle Division began forming within days of the start of the German invasion on June 29, 1941, at Murom, in the Moscow Military District. This was based on an NKVD order of that date:

In accordance with a decision of the USSR's government, the NKVD of the USSR is charged with forming fifteen rifle divisions [10 regular and 5 mountain].
1. Lieutenant General I. I. Maslennikov is entrusted with the task of forming fifteen rifle divisions of NKVD forces...
3. Begin forming and deploying the [following] divisions immediately: 243rd Rifle Division, 244th Rifle Division, 246th Rifle Division, 247th Rifle Division, 249th Rifle Division, 250th Rifle Division, 251st Rifle Division, 252nd Rifle Division, 254th Rifle Division, 256th Rifle Division...
4. To form the divisions designated above, assign 1,000 soldiers and non-commissioned officers and 500 command cadre from the NKVD's cadre to each division. Request the Red Army General Staff to provide the remainder of personnel by calling up all categories of soldiers from the reserves.
5. Complete concentrating the NKVD cadre at the formation regions by 17 July 1941...

Although the initial order for its formation came from the NKVD, when it left for the front in early July it was completely under Red Army administration. Its order of battle was as follows:

- 909th Rifle Regiment
- 916th Rifle Regiment
- 920th Rifle Regiment (until October 5, 1941)
- 778th Artillery Regiment
- 306th Antitank Battalion
- 525th Antiaircraft Battalion
- 327th Reconnaissance Company
- 416th Sapper Battalion
- 668th Signal Battalion
- 266th Medical/Sanitation Battalion
- 246th Chemical Defense (Anti-gas) Company
- 469th Auto Transport Battalion
- 285th Field Bakery
- 811th Field Postal Station
- 713th Field Office of the State Bank

Col. Sergei Pavlovich Tarasov, an NKVD officer, was not appointed to command until July 22. He would hold this position for the existence of the first formation. The division was assigned to the newly forming 31st Army on July 15. Although still seriously understrength in weapons and equipment, the division was well-staffed with Communists; on July 20 the headquarters of 31st Army noted that it included 316 members of the Communist Party and 476 Komsomols, or almost one out every eight men in its ranks. The division officially entered the fighting front on July 20.

Judging from reports on other NKVD-based divisions, the 247th was far from complete when it entered combat. The commander of the 30th Army, Maj. Gen. V. A. Khomenko, reported on August 5 regarding his 250th and 251st Divisions that they had been required to move up to 350km on foot to their concentration areas and "were taken from their assembly points in the very midst of assembly, and, incomplete, they did not approach being 'knocked together' and went into battle unprepared for combat." In addition, the 251st had only about 400 NKVD cadre soldiers.

== Operation Typhoon ==
The 31st Army, commanded by Maj. Gen. V. N. Dalmatov, initially comprised four NKVD divisions, the 244th, 246th, 247th and 249th. On July 30 the Reserve Front was formed, under command of Army Gen. G. K. Zhukov, and the Army, which now also included the 119th Rifle Division, was assigned to it. It was given responsibility for a line from the Moscow Sea to Kniazhi Gory to Shiparevo and Shchuche, with its headquarters at Rzhev. By this time the bulk of the remnants of 16th and 20th Armies had emerged from semi-encirclement near Smolensk.

According to an order sent by Zhukov late on August 6 the 31st Army was to defend its positions in accordance with Reserve Front order no.2/op., and conduct reconnaissance along the Lake Luchane, Moshnitsa River, Andreapol and Bely line. On August 25 the STAVKA directed the Army to remain in place and continue to fortify its defensive sector. By the beginning of September the Army had only the 119th, 247th and 249th Divisions under command due to transfers to other armies, but as of October 1 it had two more divisions under command.

On the same date the Army's military council issued a report on the state of the Rzhev-Vyazma fortified defensive belt, which was 265-270km in length. In total it contained 1,277 fortifications and emplacements, of which only 317 were occupied by troops. The companies, battalions, regiments and divisions had no second echelons, so the depth of the defense was no more than 4-6km. The 247th, as one example, was deployed on a 70km front. The report ominously noted that the empty pillboxes and bunkers could be easily occupied by the enemy.

The German offensive began on October 2 and by the end of the next day forces of the 7th Panzer Division had managed to break through the defenses of Western Front and seize two small bridgeheads on the east bank of the Dniepr River, which ran along the forward edge of the first belt of the Rzhev-Vyazma line. Due to poor communications between the STAVKA and the Reserve and Western Fronts, units of 32nd Army and 49th Army that were preparing to move by rail to other sectors were taken by surprise. For the same reason the 31st and 32nd Armies only learned of the fall of Kholm-Zhirkovsky on October 4. Despite the worsening situation the regrouping continued and the 110th Rifle Division, minus one regiment, moved to the 247th's defense sector. This was intended to allow the 247th, with the 510th Howitzer Artillery Regiment, 873rd Antitank Artillery Regiment, and 297th Machine Gun Battalion, to defend the fortified sector from Lipovka to Valutino. The rail movements were complicated by German air attacks.

At 1620 hours on October 5 the headquarters of Reserve Front reported to the chief of the General Staff in part as follows:

5. The 5th Rifle Division numbering 2,580 men and the 119th Rifle Division from the 31st Army, the latter relieved by units of the 247th Rifle Division, are being sent to the Gzhatsk area instead of the Vskhody area for operating against Iukhnov or Viaz'ma and Ugra, according to the situation...
6. The Front cannot hold the enemy offensive with its own forces.

The "relief" of the 119th was, in fact, the entire transfer of the 920th Rifle Regiment to that division's command. Even now, several divisions of 31st and 49th Armies were attempting to carry out the regrouping orders issued on October 1.

Finally, at 2230 hours the STAVKA decided to begin the withdrawal of the troops of Western, Reserve and Bryansk Fronts to new lines that same night. Through a supplementary order all units of 31st Army were transferred to Western Front. The Army was to defend the sector of the line running to Pena. At the same time the remainder of the 247th was withdrawn into the Army's reserve. At this point only 40-50km separated the 7th Panzer Division of 3rd Panzer Group from 10th Panzer Division of 4th Panzer Group, with both advancing on Vyazma. Overnight on October 6/7 the 119th Division and attached 920th Regiment came under control of 29th Army on the line Eraevo–Khmelevka–Olenino. On October 7 the encirclement was completed near Vyazma.

On the same date General Dalmatov was ordered to organize a defense of the second belt of the Rzhev-Vyazma line. Other than remnants of the 242nd and 250th Rifle Divisions that had been transferred from 30th Army, he had under command only the rump of the 247th, which was defending in the vicinity of Sychyovka. In order to put an end to the confusion that arose during the retreat, at 0810 hours on October 8 he ordered Colonel Tarasov to gather together all the units that had retreated to the area of Sychyovka and to the north of that point. At 0910 hours on October 10 a German regiment-sized motorized column seized Novoduginskaya Station. Two battalions of the 909th Rifle Regiment with three regimental guns and four 45mm antitank guns were sent to this area with the assignment to retake Novoduginskaya and block the advance of small German groups toward Sychyovka and Gzhatsk. However, the 247th, in the process of withdrawing to the east, itself fell into encirclement by the 1st Panzer Division. Tarasov decided to disable the division's heavy weapons and equipment, split up his personnel into small groups, and begin to make their way out to friendly forces. Several groups, numbering as many as 681 men, managed to escape, bringing with them the divisional banner. On October 14 many of the survivors of the division were incorporated into the 250th Division and the 247th was disbanded.

== 2nd Formation ==
A new 247th Rifle Division began forming on December 20 in the Moscow Military District. It was based in part on the Separate Motorized Rifle Brigade of Kalinin Front which had been largely destroyed in fighting around Staritsa and by October 19 had been reduced to roughly 300 personnel. These were combined with survivors of the first 247th to form the cadre of the second formation. Colonel Tarasov was retained in command. Its order of battle remained very similar to that of the 1st formation:

- 909th Rifle Regiment
- 916th Rifle Regiment
- 920th Rifle Regiment
- 778th Artillery Regiment
- 306th Antitank Battalion
- 246th Antiaircraft Battery (later 525th Antiaircraft Battalion) (until January 25, 1943)
- 177th Mortar Battalion (until October 8, 1942)
- 327th Reconnaissance Company
- 416th Sapper Battalion
- 668th Signal Battalion (later 428th Signal Company)
- 266th Medical/Sanitation Battalion
- 246th Chemical Defense (Anti-gas) Company
- 64th Auto Transport Company (later 469th)
- 311th Field Bakery (later 285th)
- 143rd Divisional Veterinary Hospital (later 294th)
- 49837th Field Postal Station (later 765th, 756th)
- 666th Field Office of the State Bank

On December 27 the division was assigned to 31st Army, which was now part of Kalinin Front. The weakness of its cadres in reflected in the fact that as of January 1, 1942 it still had fewer than 2,000 officers and men assigned to it. At that, it was not much smaller than most of the divisions that had fought throughout the defensive battles in front of Moscow. On January 4 Colonel Tarasov was shell-shocked and hospitalized; he would later serve in the headquarters of 41st Rifle Corps and would be promoted to the rank of major general in 1954. He was replaced the next day by Col. Grigorii Denisovich Mukhin, who had been commanding the 918th Rifle Regiment. This officer would be promoted to major general on October 1 and, remarkably, led the division continuously into the postwar.

== Battles for Rzhev ==
At the start of January the 31st Army had six divisions, including the 247th, under command, and was being led by Maj. Gen. V. A. Yushkevich. On January 8 the first Rzhev-Vyazma offensive began with a total of 14 armies of Kalinin and Western Fronts involved. Kalinin Front led the attack with 29th and 39th Armies forming its shock group. 29th Army soon began to envelop Rzhev from the west, reaching as close as 8km to the city by January 11, and the STAVKA ordered the Front commander, Col. Gen. I. S. Konev, that it be taken the following day. On its left, 31st Army secured the advance and prevented German 9th Army from shifting units to Rzhev. The German forces managed to hold the city.

On February 16 the STAVKA issued a new directive which reiterated the task for the troops of the Western Direction "to smash and destroy the enemy's Rzhev–Viaz'ma–Iukhnov grouping and by 5 March reach and dig in on our old defensive line with prepared anti-tank ditches." This directive raises doubts that the STAVKA knew the real situation. 31st Army was given the order to seize the Zubtsov area by the end of February 23. Only this Army was able to get underway on the designated start date of February 20; the others started on various days thereafter. Daily grinding attacks began, none of which brought any real results. Nevertheless, on March 20 the STAVKA again demanded that Kalinin and Western Fronts continue to execute the previously assigned orders more energetically, declaring that "the liquidation of the enemy's Rzhev–Gzhatsk–Viaz'ma grouping has been impermissibly delayed." 31st Army, with the newly refitted 29th Army, was to seize Rzhev by April 5. This effort had no more success than the previous, in part due to the start of the spring rasputitsa. By this time the Army had been reduced to just three divisions (5th, 247th, 251st). On July 24 it was transferred to Western Front and had by then been strengthened to seven divisions.

=== First Rzhev-Sychyovka Offensive ===
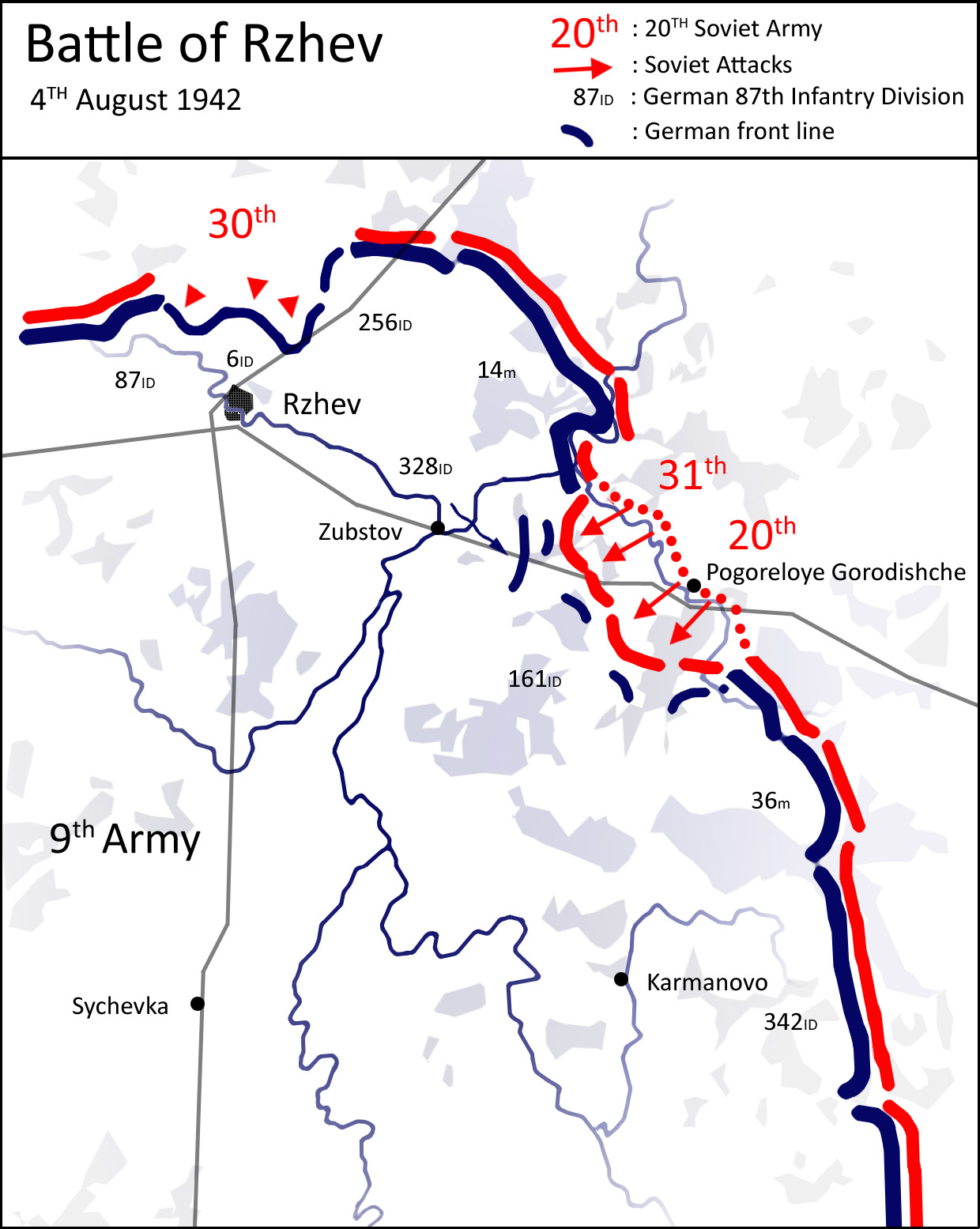
Attack of Western Front, August 4, 1942

Western Front began its part in this operation on August 4. A powerful artillery preparation reportedly knocked out 80 percent of German weapons, after which the German defenses were penetrated on both sides of Pogoreloe Gorodishche and the 31st Army's mobile group rushed through the breaches towards Zubtsov. By the evening of August 6 the breach in 9th Army's front had expanded up to 30km wide and up to 25km deep. The following day the STAVKA appointed General Zhukov to coordinate the offensives of Western and Kalinin Fronts; Zhukov proposed to liberate Rzhev with 31st and 30th Armies as soon as August 9. However, heavy German counterattacks, complicated by adverse weather, soon slowed the advance drastically. On August 23 the 31st Army, in concert with elements of the 29th Army, finally liberated Zubtsov. While this date is officially considered the end of the offensive in Soviet sources, in fact bitter fighting continued west of Zubtsov into mid-September. At dawn on September 8, 29th and 31st Armies went on a determined offensive to seize the southern part of Rzhev. Despite resolute attacks through the following day against the German 161st Infantry Division the 31st made little progress. It suspended its attacks temporarily on September 16 but resumed them with three divisions on its right flank on September 21–23 with similar lack of success. Over the course of the fighting from August 4 to September 15 the Army suffered a total of 43,321 total losses in personnel.

=== Operation Mars ===
At the beginning of October the 247th left the 31st Army and moved to the reserves of Western Front. Several weeks later it was assigned to 20th Army in the same Front. This Army, under command of Maj. Gen. N. I. Kiryukhin, was assigned the main task along the east face of the Rzhev salient; it was to drive across the Vazuza River and create a breach for its mobile forces to exploit and pinch off the northern part of the salient in conjunction with Kalinin Front from the west. The 247th and 331st Rifle Divisions formed the southern flank of the Army, backed by three tank brigades. These were to assault across the mostly frozen Vazuza between Trostino and Pechora to seize the German strongpoints at Zevalovka and Prudy. Their headlong assault was to propel them through the German forward defenses in time to link up with their right flank neighbour's attack on the second German defensive position during the second day of the advance. After this position fell, four rifle divisions would cross the Rzhev–Sychyovka railroad line by day's end, and the 247th would pivot to the southwest to guard that flank. Altogether a 15-18km wide breach in the German defenses would be created, allowing the commitment of the 6th Tank Corps and 2nd Guards Cavalry Corps into the German operational rear.

The offensive began at 0920 hours on November 25. The 247th largely faced the German 78th Infantry Division, which had just relieved the 5th Panzer Division. The preliminary 90-minute bombardment was obscured by snow and fog, limiting its effectiveness. While the northern flank of 20th Army was effectively stopped in its tracks, the 247th, with tanks of the 80th Tanks Brigade, reached the far side of the Vazuza early in the assault and, by noon, had seized the riverside villages of Zevalovka and Kuznechikha. The right flank of the 2nd Battalion of 78th Infantry's 14th Grenadier Regiment was crushed at the former place and the remnants were sent reeling into the rear. Mukhin's first echelon regiments continued their advance in the afternoon as snow again began to fall, with T-34s carrying infantry crossing open fields south of Nikonovo, threatening the headquarters of 5th Panzer. By nightfall they drove German forces from the small hamlets of Kriukovo and Bobrovka, just under 2km from the riverbank and just short of the positions from which Kiryukhin intended to commit his cavalry-mechanized group to battle. However, due to the failures elsewhere the bridgehead was far too constricted to permit this.

During the morning the 331st Division had succeeded in taking Prudy but had been halted subsequently by heavy fire from Khlepen. During the afternoon Kiryukhin shifted the bulk of the division northward to make use of the 247th's bridgehead, and ordered the two divisional commanders to commit all their infantry support tank brigades to expand it at all costs. Advancing under renewed artillery and katyusha fire, the nearly 100 Soviet tanks, operating in small assault groups and carrying infantry, put unbearable pressure on the German forces. By nightfall, three battalions of panzergrenadiers of 5th Panzer managed to bring the division to a halt just east of the high ground around the village of Arestovo. Numerous small German company, platoon and battery positions held out in the Soviet rear, hunkered into positions amid the tens of destroyed and immobilized Soviet tanks that dotted the landscape. The bypassed troops went to ground hoping for rescue in the morning.

As darkness fell, General Konev, who now commanded Western Front, decided the Army's progress was sufficient to risk the commitment of 6th Tank Corps the following day. Additional infantry would be required to support the armor, but there were only two fragile roads running forward to the Vazuza and these were soon overwhelmed, leading to chaos. None of the forces completed their concentration at the requisite time. As a result, at dawn on November 26 the 247th and 331st renewed their advance in the bridgehead, but without any additional armor support. To make matters worse, German forces were already beginning to launch local counterattacks aimed at regaining territory lost the previous day. Shortly before 1300 hours the leading tanks of 6th Corps reached the forward assembly area and, following a violent artillery barrage the four brigades began rolling into and through the positions of the 247th, which was already engaged in fighting for several German village strongpoints. On the Corps' right flank the 22nd Tank Brigade struck the fortified villages of Bolshoe Kropotovo and Maloe Kropotovo. Although parts of the villages fell to the attacking tankers, some German troops clung stubbornly to isolated positions while the 5th Panzer headquarters relocated several kilometres to the west. After having lost fully half of his 60 tanks the brigade commander laagered his remaining tanks just west of Maloe Kropotovo, leaving several battalions of the 247th to defend Bolshoe Kropotovo. By nightfall, counterattacks by advance elements of the newly-arrived 9th Panzer Division had driven the tired infantry out of the village.

Early on November 27 the 8th Guards Rifle Corps and part of 2nd Guards Cavalry Corps entered the Vazuza bridgehead to reinforce the 247th and support 6th Tanks. During the day Kiryukhin also committed his last major second echelon formation, the 1st Guards Motorized Rifle Division, specifically to Mukhin's assistance. In late afternoon, without even waiting for its supporting tanks, the division struck at the German strongpoints at Nikonovo and Maloe Kropotovo in conjunction with the 247th but suffered devastating losses from automatic weapons and mortar fire without taking the objectives. The 247th also struck at Bolshoe Kropotovo, which had been reoccupied by the 5th Panzer headquarters which barely managed to hold it. At dawn the next day General Zhukov, in overall command of the operation, and Konev ordered it renewed on all sectors in the belief that, somewhere, German defenses would crack, and any breach would distract them from the planned armored thrust by 6th Tanks.

By now the two Soviet commanders had detected the seam between 5th Panzer and 78th Infantry and were determined to crack and exploit it. Late on the evening of November 27 heavy snow again began to fall. As 2nd Guards Cavalry began moving shortly after midnight to link up with 6th Tanks, the combined 247th, 1st Guards Motorized and 26th Guards Rifle Divisions renewed their assaults on Bolshoe and Maloe Kropotovo, Nikonovo and Podosinovka. The last of these places was reported as having fallen at 1000 hours, but this proved incorrect; in fact all held out against the best efforts of the three rifle divisions.

After midnight on November 29 General Kiryukhin received Zhukov's message ordering the 6th Tanks to break out of encirclement back across the Rzhev–Sychyovka road. To assist the breakout the 247th, 1st Guards Motorized, and recently arrived 20th Guards Rifle Division would join the 100th Tank Brigade to drive forward in the central sector. At 0625 hours the 20th Army's artillery opened heavy fire on German positions around Podosinovka. Fifteen minutes later the 16th Guards Cavalry Regiment of 4th Guards Cavalry Division charged through the cold ground fog into the teeth of the village's defenses, followed by infantry of the 247th; this was the division's fifth major assault in as many days. Soon fierce fighting raged along the entire front. Two of Mukhin's rifle regiments attacked German positions at Zherebtsovo, and the remainder of 1st Guards struck Nikonovo from the south. Try as they did the two divisions where unable to break the German grip on their strongholds.

The attacks resumed after midnight on November 30, accompanied by artillery fire and air attacks after daybreak. Regrouped remnants of 2nd Guards Cavalry once again attacked Maloe Kropotovo and Podosinovka along with the 1st Guards Motorized and 247th plus a small number of infantry support tanks. The Soviet forces seized all but the northern portion of Maloe Kropotovo and the 78th Infantry defending to the south reported the village's fall; in fact the 5th Panzer's reconnaissance battalion and the staff of 430th Grenadier Regiment clung desperately to a foothold and inflicted heavy losses. Meanwhile, the 4th Guards Cavalry, with support of other elements of the 247th, suffered losses in another series of unsuccessful attacks at Podosinovka. By late that night it was clear to all that the offensive on this sector had failed at immense human and material cost. Despite the obvious failure Zhukov continued issuing attack orders for five more days with no more success than before. On the night of December 5 what remained of 20th Army was ordered over to the defense.

Lt. Gen. M. S. Khozin had taken over command of the Army on December 4. Zhukov was still determined to renew the offensive, and in his orders from the Front on December 8 he was directed:

... to penetrate enemy defenses in the Bol'shoe Kropotovo, Iarygino sector on 10 and 11 December, take Sychevka no later that 15 December, and move no fewer than two rifle divisions into the Andreevskoe sector on 20 December to work with Kalinin Front's 41st Army to seal the encirclement of the enemy.

To do so Zhukov provided Khozin with infantry reinforcements and the fresh 5th Tank Corps, which had previously been held in reserve as an exploitation force. The 1st Guards Motorized and the 247th, which had previously been withdrawn to Front command for rest and refitting, were returned to 20th Army. Mukhin had received 1,500 replacements from the 48th Ski Brigade and 500 men from penal battalions. 6th Tank Corps was also hurriedly rebuilt. With this force Khozin was tasked with attacking directly into the teeth of the German defense in the Vazuza River bridgehead from Bolshoe Kropotovo to Zherebtsovo. On December 11 the partly rebuilt 247th, made an attack en masse alongside the 243rd, 336th, 415th and 30th Guards Rifle Divisions, but together they made scanty gains of 500 - 1,000 metres at significant cost, and failed to capture a single German-held fortified village:

A rocket rising into the air signalled the attack. All those around came to life. The cries of "Forward!" and "For the Fatherland!" resounded across the fields. It was at 1010 hours 11 December 1942. The first to rush forward were the regiments of the 20th Army's 243rd and 247th Rifle Divisions. Soon, however, their forward ranks were forced to take cover against the heavy enemy fire. A fierce, bloody battle began that lasted all day. The attack misfired almost along the entire extent of the penetration front.

Three days later, the offensive was shut down for good. In the period from November 25 to December 18 the division lost 1,143 men killed and 5,301 wounded, for a total of 6,444 casualties, the highest figure in 20th Army. During January 1943 it was again withdrawn into the Front reserves.

=== Zhizdra Offensive ===
Around mid-February the 247th was transferred to Lt. Gen. I. Kh. Bagramyan's 16th Army, still in Western Front. In the wake of the battle of Stalingrad and the subsequent successes on the southern part of the front this Army, along with the 3rd and 61st Armies of Bryansk Front, were ordered to strike the defenses of 2nd Panzer Army along the northern and northeastern faces of the Oryol salient. 16th Army was to attack the 208th and 211th Infantry Divisions north of Zhizdra with six rifle divisions supported by three tank brigades. After splitting the two divisions and taking the town, located about 20km south of the front line, the shock group would be reinforced with the 247th and 64th Rifle Divisions and two more tank brigades prior to the introduction of 9th Tank Corps as the mobile force.

The shock group commenced its assault early on February 22 after an intense artillery preparation. Despite the formidable strength of the attacking force, rainy weather, mud-clogged roads and a stubborn and skilful defense kept forward progress to a minimum. After heavy losses in material and manpower the 16th Army managed to gain only 7km by February 25; for this reason Konev denied Bagramyan permission to commit 9th Tanks. By this time the 247th had been introduced to the fighting near the Army's right flank east of Bukan with the support of the 256th Tank Brigade, but this made no appreciable difference. By February 27 the newly arrived 5th Panzer Division had contained Bagramyan's forces and the offensive was suspended. In March the division was transferred again, now to 10th Army, still in Western Front, which was now under command of Col. Gen. V. D. Sokolovskii.

== Battles for Smolensk and Belorussia ==
The 247th took part in Operation Suvorov, the grinding offensive westward towards Smolensk, which began on August 7, but did not involve 10th Army until three days later. On August 10 General Sokolovskii ordered the Army to attack north-west out of its salient around Kirov against the LVI Panzer Corps. The command of the German 4th Army was not expecting an attack from this direction, and three rifle divisions (247th, 290th and 330th) were able to punch through the left flank of the 321st Infantry Division and advance 5km on the first day. This was the first breakthrough achieved in the offensive, but 10th Army did not have a mobile group to exploit it. 9th Panzer Division was ordered to intervene, but before it could arrive the Soviet divisions began to roll up the 131st Infantry Division, and the right flank of 4th Army began falling back to secondary positions.

A further offensive thrust began on September 15 and 10th Army was soon across the Desna River and aiming for Roslavl. Ten days later the division was rewarded with a battle honor:

ROSLAVL... 247th Rifle Division (Major General Mukhin, Grigorii Denisovich)... The troops who participated in the liberation of Smolensk and Roslavl, by the order of the Supreme High Command of 25 September 1943, and a commendation in Moscow, are given a salute of 20 artillery salvoes from 224 guns.

Following this victory the 49th and 10th Armies on Western Front's extended left wing plowed forward to the west, attempting to keep pace with the Front's armies operating along the main axis farther to the north.

=== Orsha Offensives ===
10th Army had to confront the problem of coordinating its advance with Bryansk Front's 50th Army on its left, which was lagging behind. Both Armies closed up to the Pronia River on October 2. When it did so, 10th Army was arrayed from Budino southward to Petukhovka. The 247th and 139th Rifle Divisions, backed by the 49th Rifle Division, deployed in the sector south of Budino, while the three divisions of 38th Rifle Corps took up positions southeast of Chavusy. Given the relatively small size of the Army it was limited to a passive, secondary role for the time being.

The 247th took a more active role in the second Orsha offensive, which began on October 12. In preparation the 33rd Army was regrouped into a sector formerly occupied by the 21st Army north and south of Lenino. It formed its first echelon from the 42nd and 290th Rifle Divisions and the 1st Polish Infantry Division, supported by the 164th and 222nd Rifle Divisions in second echelon. Meanwhile, the 247th and 139th Divisions were transferred by road march from 10th Army to reinforce this second echelon, which was to assault German positions across the Myareya River just north of Lenino. The offensive began following an 85-minute artillery preparation which failed to take the defenders by surprise. In two days of fighting the Western Front armies were almost completely stymied; the Polish Division was able to carve out a wedge up to 3km deep west of Lenino at considerable cost, especially due to air attacks. The 247th was committed on October 16 to the battle for a bridgehead between that place and Baevo but this also yielded meagre gains. When the offensive ended on the 18th it had cost the Poles nearly 3,000 casualties and 33rd Army's remaining divisions a further 1,700 personnel. Before the end of the month the division had been transferred again, now to 49th Army, still in Western Front, where it was assigned to 62nd Rifle Corps in November.

The cost of the fighting since August is reflected in the fact that by December the 247th was officially authorized only a "short" organization of 7,800 personnel, and in fact had just 3,650 on hand, less than 50 percent of the reduced authorization. The three rifle regiments had only 550-600 men each, about the normal strength of a battalion. The 306th Antitank Battalion had been reduced to a single company of antitank rifles. On the other hand, the artillery regiment was at full strength, with eight 76mm cannon and four 122mm howitzers in each of the three battalions, and 740 officers and men assigned. The 266th Medical Battalion had just one medical company containing 400 men and women, including wounded recovering with the division.

In March 1944, Western Front began yet another offensive against Orsha. At this time the division was still in 62nd Corps of 49th Army, and was in the first echelon of the attack as part of the Army's shock group. The Corps was to attack in the sector extending from Lazyrshchina southward to Lobany against the center section of 78th Sturm Division's sector; 63rd and 352nd Rifle Divisions would back up the 247th in the lead. The attack began at 0930 hours on March 5 following a 50-minute artillery preparation but the first echelon divisions of 49th and 31st Armies made only limited progress against a strong defense. The combined forces of 331st and 247th Divisions managed to advance up to 1,000m and capture the strongpoint at Lazyrshchiki, but recorded even smaller gains over the next two days. However, the remainder of the attacking forces north and south of the Orsha–Smolensk road were stalled from the outset. Desultory fighting continued in the area until mid-month but no further gains were made and the effort cost Sokolovskii's forces another 7,537 casualties.

By now this general's leadership was coming under question at the highest levels. In a report to Stalin dated April 11 a commission of five officers detailed the failings they had uncovered in the operations of Western Front from October 12, 1943 to April 1, 1944. Among many other issues it reported that "From 1 January through 15 February, 192nd, 247th, and 174th Rifle Divisions conducted hundreds of reconnaissance raiding operations and seized not a single prisoner." As a result Sokolovskii was removed from command on April 15 and Western Front was split into 2nd and 3rd Belorussian Fronts. At this time the 247th was in the Reserve of the Supreme High Command for rebuilding in the 61st Rifle Corps of 69th Army. By the start of May this Corps and Army had returned to the front as part of 1st Belorussian Front. The division would remain under these commands for the duration of the war. 69th Army was under command of Lt. Gen. V. Ya. Kolpakchi into the postwar.

== Operation Bagration ==
At the start of the summer offensive the 61st Corps had the 134th, 247th and 274th Rifle Divisions under command. 69th Army was one of three armies on the left flank of the Front south of the Pripyat River that remained on the defense during the first weeks of the offensive. It was intended that they would enter the fighting as it developed to the west.

=== Lublin-Brest Offensive ===
When the left wing went over to the offensive it was ordered to be ready to attack in the direction of Siedlce and Lublin, and with part of its forces to capture Brest in cooperation with the Front's right-wing forces. The attack was first scheduled for July 15 and then for July 17. On July 28 forces of the 28th, 61st and 70th Armies captured the town and fortress of Brest after heavy fighting. This allowed the Front commander, Marshal K. K. Rokossovskii, to direct his main forces along the Warsaw axis, where German resistance was increasing daily. 69th Army seized a bridgehead in the Puławy area at the end of the month, and was engaged in heavy fighting to expand it.

Among the men who fought for the Puławy bridgehead over the Vistula was Cpt. Dmitrii Trofimovich Ivanov, commander of the 306th Antitank Battalion. On the night of July 29 Ivanov organized the crossing of batteries to the left bank of the Vistula, and then a strong antitank defense of the bridgehead. The gunners under his command participated in repelling five counterattacks by German infantry and tanks, holding the captured bridgehead. Three days later a further counterattack threw about 25 tanks and ten self-propelled guns onto the position of the entrenched division. Artillerymen, led by Captain Ivanov, opened direct fire. Eight tanks and four self-propelled guns were destroyed or disabled. At the critical moment of the battle, German tanks crushed two guns at the position of one of the batteries. Ivanov arrived there and personally knocked out two tanks with grenades, after which he organized further defense from the reserves. On September 25 he became one of ten soldiers of the division who became Heroes of the Soviet Union for their roles in the defense of the bridgehead. He survived the war and worked in Orekhovo-Zuyevo as an engineer until his death on March 16, 1970.

== Into Germany ==
At the start of the new offensive on January 14, 1945, the Puławy bridgehead contained 69th and 33rd Armies, which were to attack along a 13km sector in the direction of Radom, and then towards Łódź. 69th Army had the 11th Tank Corps as its mobile group. The assault quickly overcame the defenders, and Radom was liberated on January 16, while flanking forces of the 69th assisted in the clearing of the greater Warsaw area.

=== Battle of Berlin ===
As the division closed on the Oder River it entered the historic province of Brandenburg and, in recognition of its role in the fighting there, on April 5 the 778th Artillery Regiment was awarded the Order of the Red Banner.

At the start of the Berlin operation the 69th Army was deployed along the east bank of the Oder, as well as in the bridgehead north of Frankfurt-on-Oder, on an 18km front. Its main attack was to take place from this bridgehead along a 6km attack sector using six rifle divisions in a single echelon. 61st Corps had all four of its divisions (it now also contained the 41st Rifle Division) in the bridgehead on this main attack axis. The 41st, 247th and 274th were in first echelon with the 134th in second. The Army's task was to break through the German defense on a sector from Height 63.0 (2km north of Lebus) to Wuste Kunersdorf and by the end of the first day capture a line from Leizen to Treplin. It was to simultaneously launch an auxiliary attack on Bossen, in order to outflank Frankfurt-on-Oder from the northwest. Subsequently it was to attack in the general direction of Trebus–Werlsee–Dahlem and to capture the southeastern and southern parts of Berlin on the operation's sixth day and reach the southeastern bank of Lake Havel.

Marshal Zhukov, who was now in command of 1st Belorussian Front, chose to launch his part of the offensive with a night attack very early on April 16. For the first time in a mass effort it was planned to employ anti-aircraft searchlights to blind the enemy and illuminate the terrain; 36 were deployed on 69th Army's front. The Army attacked at 0530 hours, following a 10-minute artillery preparation. Having advanced 2-4km in conditions of fierce fighting with numerous German strongpoints and, having beaten off a series of counterattacks, the Army's forces broke through the main defensive zone in the Lebus highway–Schoenfliess station area and by the end of the day had reached the line Podelzig–Malnow–Schoenfliess–Wuste Kunersdorf and reached the second defensive zone.

On the second day, following a 30-minute artillery preparation, the Army resumed the offensive at 1030 hours, cleared Malnow, and advanced 1-2km along certain axes. During April 18 the 69th carried out a partial regrouping on its right flank in order to take advantage of the success of the adjacent 8th Guards Army and resumed its attack at 1230, following a 30-minute preparation supported by 16th Air Army, which struck the German strongpoint at Altzeschdorf. The German forces put up fierce resistance, including 14 counterattacks. By the end of the day the 61st Corps, which was attacking along the Army's center, had advanced 1,000m and was fighting in the second defensive zone in the eastern part of Neider-Esar. It resumed this assault the next day and in cooperation with 25th Rifle Corps took this place as well as Alt Malisch, breaking through the second zone and reaching the line Alt Malisch–Height 62.0.

==== Encirclement of 9th Army ====
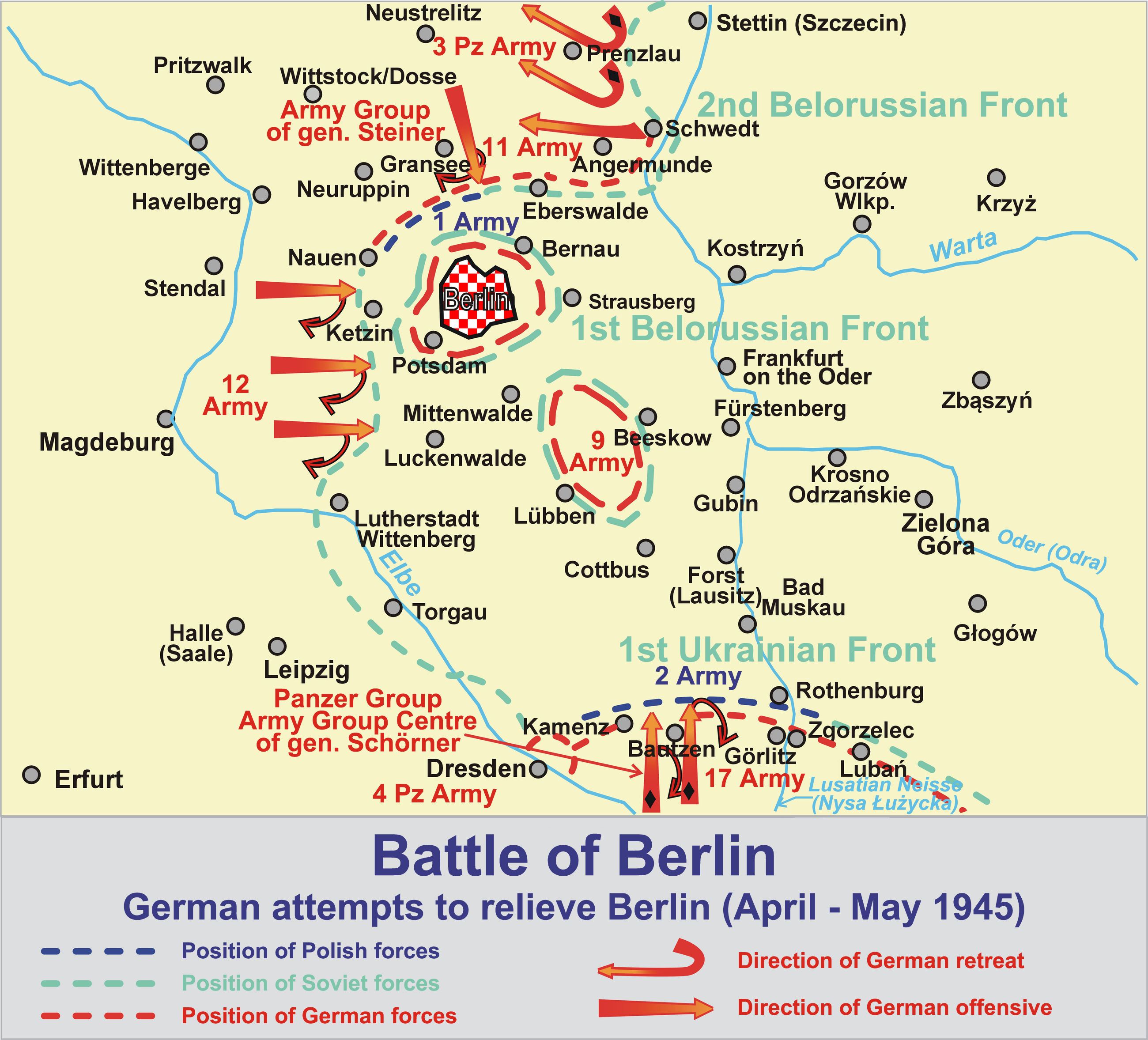
Battle of Berlin, around April 26. Note encircled 9th Army.

On April 20 the 69th advanced its right flank by 10km, breaking through the German first intermediate position and by the day's end had reached the line of the Krummer See–the Burgsee–the northern outskirts of Wulkow having turned its front to the southwest and south. The next day the pace accelerated and the Army advanced its right flank 20km to the west, broke through the third defensive zone in the Buchholz area and by the end of the day was fighting along the line Enkendorf–Buchholz–Arensdorf–Wulkow, with its front facing south along an extended 40km front. Zhukov ordered Kolpakchi to resume the offensive in the direction of Fürstenwalde and Bad Saarow from the morning of April 22. The Army's right flank advanced to the south, gaining 7km in heavy fighting, took Fürstenwalde, and reached the Spree River in this area. 69th Army was now threatening the path of retreat of German 9th Army which was falling back from its positions on the Oder south of Frankfurt. During the day about 30,000 shells and mortar rounds were fired against 69th Army's positions.

Kolpakchi was now tasked with preventing the withdrawal of this German force to the west and northwest by continuing to press southward to occupy a line from the Scharmützelsee to Bad Saarow to Kechendorf. On April 23 the 69th and 33rd Armies, the newly-committed 3rd Army, and the 2nd Guards Cavalry Corps, advanced to isolate the 9th Army from Berlin. The 69th ran into stubborn resistance and made only minor gains. The following day the Army's orders remained as previous. After beating off eight counterattacks up to a battalion in strength supported by tanks it advanced 3-6km and reached the line Reichenwalde–Petersdorf–Kersdorf. By day's end only a 10km gap remained in the encirclement of 9th Army. Throughout April 25 69th Army's forces continued fighting along its previous line against desperate resistance, but the encirclement was completed on other sectors.

At 1600 hours that day Zhukov ordered the 69th, 33rd and 3rd Armies, plus 2nd Guards Cavalry to continue attacking to destroy the encircled grouping, in conjunction with 1st Ukrainian Front, by breaking it up into several isolated pockets. 69th Army was to strike with its right flank in the direction of Riplos, Hersdorf and Streganz and then, depending on the situation, attack to the south or southeast. By the end of April 26 the Army was fighting along the line Klein Eichholtz–Storkow–Kablow, having advanced 15km during the day. The following day it was engaged in heavy fighting with German detachments covering the defiles between the lakes, but still advanced 6km along its left flank. During April 28 the 69th Army attacked to the southwest along both banks of the Schweriner See, pushing aside covering units, and advanced up to 6km. The next day the 9th Army resumed its attempts to break out of the encirclement, leading to furious fighting. By the end of the day the combined forces of 69th, 33rd and 3rd Armies had almost completely eliminated that part of the German grouping covering the main forces' breakthrough, and the main force had been broken into three distinct pockets. One pocket was in the Wendisch-Bucholtz area; during April 30 the combined Soviet armies completed its liquidation by 1700 hours, and the remainder of 9th Army was eliminated on May 1.

From May 3-8 the 69th Army advanced to the Elbe River, eliminating small strongpoints and German covering groups as it went. It reached the river on the sector from Burg to Schönebeck, where on May 5 it established contact with the American 83rd Infantry Division.

== Postwar ==
On May 28 the rifle regiments of the division were recognized for their part in the battles for Berlin with the Order of Kutuzov, 3rd Degree, while the 778th Artillery Regiment was awarded the Order of Bogdan Khmelnitsky, 2nd Degree. According to STAVKA Order No. 11095 of May 29, 1945, part 6, the 247th is listed as one of the rifle divisions to be "disbanded in place". On June 11 the division as a whole was finally decorated with the Order of the Red Banner for its part in the liquidation of 9th Army southeast of Berlin. It was disbanded in accordance with Order No. 11095 in July 1945.
