= German Tarasov =

Red Army general (1906–1944)

German Fyodorovich Tarasov
- Герман Фёдорович Тарасов
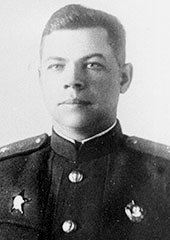
- Born: 29 March [O.S. 16 March] 1906; Mokrousovo, Mokrousovsky volost, Yalutorovsky Uyezd, Tobolsk Governorate, Russian Empire
- Died: 19 October 1944 (aged 38); Kisújszállás, Jász-Nagykun-Szolnok County, Hungary
- Military career
- Allegiance: Soviet Union
- Branch: Red Army; NKVD Border Troops
- Service years: 1925–1944
- Rank: Major general
- Commands: 249th Rifle Division (later 16th Guards Rifle Division); Operational Group of the 39th Army; 41st Army; 70th Army; 24th Army; 53rd Army
- Conflicts: World War II
- Awards: Order of Lenin; Order of the Red Banner; Order of Bogdan Khmelnitsky, 1st class; Order of the Patriotic War, 1st class; Order of the Red Star (2)

German Fyodorovich Tarasov (Russian: Ге́рман Фёдорович Тара́сов; 29 March [O.S. 16 March] 1906 – 19 October 1944) was a Red Army major general during World War II.

An officer in the NKVD Border Troops before World War II, Tarasov was given command of the 249th Rifle Division after Operation Barbarossa, the German invasion of the Soviet Union, began in June 1941. He led the division during the Battle of Moscow and the Toropets–Kholm Offensive, and was decorated for his leadership of the 249th, which was converted into the 16th Guards Rifle Division. Tarasov was appointed commander of the 41st Army in May 1942, but was relieved of command for his performance during Operation Mars in November and December. He was given command of the 70th Army, formed from NKVD personnel, and led the army during the failed Dmitriyev-Sevsk Offensive in February and March 1943. He was relieved of command again and transferred to command the 24th Army (converted into the 4th Guards Army in April), then in reserve. However, Tarasov was swiftly demoted to army deputy commander, and successively held that position in the 4th Guards Army and the 7th Guards Army during the rest of the year. After the 53rd Army's commander was wounded in December, he briefly took command of the army but was demoted again to deputy commander in January 1944. Tarasov was killed in action during the Battle of Debrecen in October of that year.

== Early life and interwar period ==
Tarasov was born on 29 March 1906 in the village of Mokrousovo in Tobolsk Governorate. From the fall of 1923 he studied at the Tyumen Road Construction Institute, but did not graduate due to its closure, after which he worked as a teacher at the first-stage (primary) school in the village of Poloy. In August 1925, Tarasov joined the Red Army and entered the Ulyanovsk Military School, graduating with honors in September 1927. After graduation, he became a platoon commander in the 71st Separate Battalion of the Urals OGPU Troops at Sverdlovsk. In November he transferred to the 113th Separate Battalion of the OGPU Troops there, serving as a platoon commander and battalion adjutant. In March 1932, Tarasov became chief of the school of junior commanders of the 29th Regiment of the OGPU Troops in Magnitogorsk. He studied at the Frunze Military Academy from April 1934 to October 1937, graduating with honors and a 1st degree diploma.

After his graduation, Tarasov was sent to the 14th Plyeshchanitsy Border Detachment of the NKVD Troops to serve as its chief of staff. From August 1938, he served in the Headquarters of the Border Troops of the Belorussian District in Minsk as chief of the 1st Section of the 3rd Department. In March 1939, he became chief of the 2nd Department, and in September was involved in the Soviet invasion of Poland in this post. In 1940 he became chief of staff of the Transbaikal border detachment.

== World War II ==
Following the beginning of Operation Barbarossa, the German invasion of the Soviet Union, on 22 June 1941, Tarasov was given command of the 249th Rifle Division, forming in the Moscow Military District at Zagorsk. After completing its formation, the 249th was transferred to the Reserve Front's 31st Army, and defended positions around Ostashkov until 7 October, when it was transferred to the Western Front's 22nd Army. On 19 October the army became part of the Kalinin Front. During October and November, the 249th fought in the Vyazma Defensive and the Kalinin Defensive Operations, part of the Battle of Moscow. In December, with the 4th Shock Army, it participated in the Toropets–Kholm Offensive, capturing Andreapol and Toropets. For its "courage and heroism", the division was converted into the 16th Guards Rifle Division and awarded the Order of Lenin on 16 February 1942. Tarasov was also awarded the Order of Lenin. In February, the division fought in the Demyansk Offensive, capturing the settlements of Nizhny Sekachi, Verkhne Sekachi, and Kamenka in fierce fighting.

In April, Tarasov became acting commander of an Operational Group of the Kalinin Front's 39th Army. He took command of the 41st Army on 16 May. After completing its formation, the army joined the Kalinin Front, defending positions on a line southwest of Bely. In November and December, Tarasov led the army in Operation Mars, an attempt to encircle and destroy the German 9th Army in the Rzhev Salient. The army's attacks failed, and Tarasov was relieved of command late on 14 December by Georgy Zhukov, who personally took temporary command of the 41st Army. Around late December, Tarasov took command of the Army of NKVD Troops (redesignated 70th Army in early February), formed from NKVD Border and Internal Troops personnel in the Reserve of the Supreme High Command (RVGK). On 15 February, the army joined the Central Front, holding positions on the line of Samolurovka and Maloarkhangelsk. In late February and March, it fought in the Dmitriyev-Sevsk Offensive. The offensive bogged down against German resistance and he was dismissed at Konstantin Rokossovsky's request.

In March, Tarasov was appointed commander of the 24th Army in the RVGK, but in April he was demoted to deputy commander for "inconsistent performance". On 16 April it was redesignated the 4th Guards Army. As part of the Voronezh Front, the 4th Guards Army fought in the Belgorod-Kharkov Offensive Operation and the Battle of the Dnieper from the summer through the early fall of 1943. In November he briefly transferred to become deputy commander of the 7th Guards Army, and took temporary command of the 53rd Army in December when army commander Ivan Managarov was wounded. Due to "command failures" he was demoted to deputy commander of the army on 5 January 1944. While the army was part of the 2nd Ukrainian Front, Tarasov served in that position during the Korsun–Shevchenkovsky Offensive, the Uman–Botoșani Offensive, the Second Jassy–Kishinev Offensive, and the Battle of Debrecen. During the latter operation, he was killed in fighting on the outskirts of Kisújszállás on 19 October. Tarasov was buried in Kotovsk, Odessa Oblast.

== Awards ==
Tarasov received the following awards and decorations:

- Order of Lenin
- Order of the Red Banner
- Order of Bogdan Khmelnitsky, 1st class
- Order of the Patriotic War, 1st class
- Order of the Red Star (2)
