= 249th Rifle Division =

249th Rifle Division (June 26, 1941 – February 16, 1942) 249th Estonian Rifle Division (February 28, 1942 – June 28, 1945)
- Active: 1941 – 1945
- Country: Soviet Union
- Branch: Red Army
- Type: Infantry
- Size: Division
- Engagements: Battle of Moscow; Toropets–Kholm Offensive; Battle for Velikiye Luki; Battle of Nevel; Battle of Narva; Baltic Offensive (1944); Courland Pocket
- Decorations: Order of Lenin (1st Formation); Order of the Red Banner (2nd Formation)

Commanders
- Notable commanders: Maj. Gen. German Fyodorovich Tarasov; Maj. Gen. Lembit Abramovich Pern; Maj. Karl Karlovich Kanger; Col. Artur-Aleksandr Yosipovich Saueselg; Maj. Gen. Yogan Yakovlevich Lombak

The 249th Rifle Division was the fifth of a group of 10 regular rifle divisions formed from cadres of NKVD border and internal troops as standard Red Army rifle divisions, very shortly after the German invasion, in the Moscow Military District. It was largely based on what would become the shtat (table of organization and equipment) of July 29, 1941, with several variations. It was initially assigned to 31st Army, which joined Reserve Front in July. By December it had been moved north to join 4th Shock Army in Northwestern Front. When that Front joined the winter counteroffensive in January 1942 the 249th played a leading role in the encirclement and destruction of a German infantry regiment that had just arrived by rail from France. It went on to help retake the German-held towns of Andreapol and Toropets, capturing significant supplies and deeply outflanking the German 9th Army. Later in the month it was transferred with 4th Shock to Kalinin Front and in early February made an abortive advance on Vitebsk. Despite this failure, on February 16 it was redesignated as the 16th Guards Rifle Division.

The second formation was largely made up of ethnic Estonians and was known as the 249th Estonian Rifle Division. It was formed for political, as well as military purposes, and it required permission from the STAVKA to be committed to combat. As part of 8th Estonian Rifle Corps it fought its first battle for the besieged city of Velikiye Luki during December 1942/January 1943, securing the victory at considerable cost. Due to the difficulty of obtaining Estonian recruits while that state was still under German occupation it took many months to rebuild. In November it took part in an effort to liberate the town of Novosokolniki, but this was unsuccessful and caused further losses. Shortly after, it was transferred to the 8th Army of Leningrad Front, which appeared to have the best chance to quickly enter Estonian territory. Under these commands the division staged several operations to clear the large islands at the mouth of the Gulf of Riga. Returning to the mainland it took part in retaking the Estonian capital, before joining the forces that contained the German troops trapped in the Courland Pocket for the duration of the war. Shortly after the German surrender the division was redesignated as the 122nd Guards Rifle Division.

== 1st Formation ==
The division began organizing on June 26, 1941 at Zagorsk in the Moscow Military District. This was based on an NKVD order of that date:

In accordance with a decision of the USSR's government, the NKVD of the USSR is charged with forming fifteen rifle divisions [10 regular and 5 mountain].
1. Lieutenant General I. I. Maslennikov is entrusted with the task of forming fifteen rifle divisions of NKVD forces...
3. Begin forming and deploying the [following] divisions immediately: 243rd Rifle Division, 244th Rifle Division, 246th Rifle Division, 247th Rifle Division, 249th Rifle Division, 250th Rifle Division, 251st Rifle Division, 252nd Rifle Division, 254th Rifle Division, 256th Rifle Division...
4. To form the divisions designated above, assign 1,000 soldiers and non-commissioned officers and 500 command cadre from the NKVD's cadre to each division. Request the Red Army General Staff to provide the remainder of personnel by calling up all categories of soldiers from the reserves.
5. Complete concentrating the NKVD cadre at the formation regions by 17 July 1941...

Although the initial order for its formation came from the NKVD, when it left for the front in early July it was completely under Red Army administration. Its order of battle was as follows:

- 917th Rifle Regiment
- 921st Rifle Regiment
- 925th Rifle Regiment
- 779th Artillery Regiment
- 307th Antitank Battalion
- 326th Antiaircraft Battery (later 526th Antiaircraft Battalion)
- 328th Reconnaissance Company
- 417th Sapper Battalion
- 669th Signal Battalion
- 267th Medical/Sanitation Battalion
- 247th Chemical Defense (Anti-gas) Company
- 65th Motor Transport Company (later 470th)
- 287th Field Bakery
- 812th Field Postal Station

Maj. Gen. German Fyodorovich Tarasov, who would lead the division for the rest of its first formation, took command on July 2. The division was assigned to 31st Army on July 10, and it entered the fighting front on July 18. Judging from reports on other NKVD-based divisions, the 249th was far from complete when it entered combat. The commander of the 30th Army, Maj. Gen. V. A. Khomenko, reported on August 5 regarding his 250th and 251st Divisions that they had been required to move up to 350km on foot to their concentration areas and "were taken from their assembly points in the very midst of assembly, and, incomplete, they did not approach being 'knocked together' and went into battle unprepared for combat." In addition, the 251st had only about 400 NKVD cadre soldiers.

=== In Reserve Front ===
The 31st Army, commanded by Maj. Gen. V. N. Dalmatov, initially comprised four NKVD divisions, the 244th, 246th, 247th and 249th. On July 30 the Reserve Front was formed, under command of Army Gen. G. K. Zhukov, and the Army, which now also included the 119th Rifle Division, was assigned to it. It was given responsibility for a line from the Moscow Sea to Kniazhi Gory to Shiparevo and Shchuche, with its headquarters at Rzhev. According to an order sent by Zhukov late on August 6 the 31st Army was to defend its positions in accordance with Reserve Front order no.2/op., and conduct reconnaissance along the Lake Luchane, Moshnitsa River, Andreapol and Bely line.

On August 25 the STAVKA directed the Army to remain in place and continue to fortify its defensive sector. By the beginning of September the Army had only the 119th, 247th and 249th Divisions under command due to transfers to other armies, but as of October 1 it had two more divisions under command. During October, even as Army Group Center was beginning its final drive on Moscow, the 249th was reassigned to 22nd Army in Kalinin Front, which was rebuilding after being partly overrun by German forces in September. In December the 249th was transferred again to 27th Army, which was soon renamed 4th Shock Army, in Northwestern Front, in time for the general Soviet counteroffensive against the German Army Group Center starting on December 5.

== Toropets-Kholm Offensive ==
On December 18 the STAVKA issued its Order No. 005868 to the command of Northwestern Front, spelling out the goals and objectives of the operation:

No later than December 26, 1941 to strike with at least six reinforced divisions from the Ostashkov area in the general direction of Toropets, Velizh and Rudnya, having the task, in cooperation with forces of Kalinin Front, to cut off the enemy's paths of retreat and not allow him to defend along his prepared front lines... Ultimately, pressing the offensive to Rudnya will cut off Smolensk from the west.

The very next day the chief of the General Staff, Marshal B. M. Shaposhnikov, postponed the date of the beginning of the offensive from December 24 to December 29-30. However, the sparsity of the road network in the concentration area of the formations for the two armies forced the operation to be postponed for a further week.

The severe winter weather also proved a hindrance, further delaying the concentration of troops, and it was not until January 7-8, 1942, that sufficient forces were in place for the offensive to commence. Even so, some smaller units, as well as rear area services of several front-line units, trailed behind, and had to catch up with the offensive after it began on January 9. The troops of 3rd and 4th Shock Armies were deployed on a front of about 100km. Most of the 253rd Infantry Division was holding the line against 4th Shock. It was subordinate to XXIII Army Corps of 9th Army in Army Group Center. The German positions could only loosely be called a line. They were, in fact, a string of fortified outposts, with garrisons in the scattered settlements; some of the more difficult sectors were simply patrolled. On the other hand, the 253rd had been in these positions since late October, and so had had more than enough time to prepare and fortify them. In reserve was the Waffen SS Cavalry Brigade, and the 81st Infantry Division, commanded by Lt. Gen. E. Schopper, which had departed the coast of France on December 23, was scheduled to arrive by rail in the Toropets area.

The final plan was as follows. 3rd Shock was to strike the main blow in the direction of Velikiye Luki. 4th Shock was to advance on Peno and Andreapol along the rail line to Toropets. The troops of the two shock armies occupied their jump-off positions on the night of January 8/9. The next morning the offensive began following an artillery preparation of 90 minutes. 4th Shock made considerably more progress on the first day than 3rd, gaining anywhere from 8-15 km. Much of the difference between the two armies can be explained by their effective strengths. The “seasoned” divisions of 3rd Shock had taken casualties in previous operations and averaged about 8,700 officers and men each, while the fresh divisions of 4th Shock, including the 249th, averaged over 11,100 troops. Artillery strengths were also quite different; 4th Shock had a total of 790 guns of 76mm calibre or greater, while 3rd Shock had only 489.

=== Ambush at Okhvat ===
The first elements of 81st Infantry, the 189th Infantry Regiment, commanded by Colonel Hohmeyer, together with the 2nd Battalion of Artillery Regiment 181 and the 3rd Company of Engineer Battalion 181, were ordered to detrain at Toropets and Andreapol and advance towards Okhvat, in an attempt to stabilize the front that had been shattered by Northwestern and Kalinin Fronts' offensive. Out of the snow came 4th Shock Army. Its ski troops were in their element, and the 67th and 68th Battalions crossed a frozen lake to cut the German escape routes. The German force was outflanked and encircled. In response it fell into what the Soviets called a motti, adopting the Finnish word for encircled Soviet forces during the Winter War of 1939-40. But while many mottis had held out for weeks and even longer, due to the Finns’ lack of manpower and heavy weapons, this German motti would have no such luck. The regiment was attacked from the front by the 249th, reinforced by artillery and tanks. At the same time it was taken in the flank by the 332nd Rifle Division. The fight lasted from January 13–15, and ended with the 189th Regiment completely destroyed; over 1,100 men were killed and only 40 artillerymen managed to escape to German lines. The entire series of events unfolded so fast that the regiment was not even identified on the German situation maps. Hohmeyer was posthumously promoted to the rank of major general.

=== Battle for Toropets ===
On January 16 the 249th Division led 4th Shock Army in the storming of Andreapol, capturing much-needed supplies in the process. But the big prize was Toropets to the west. The city was weakly garrisoned by elements of the 403rd Security Division and remnants of the 123rd Infantry Division, which had earlier faced 3rd Shock. They were guarding vast German stores which were vital to both sides. Once again in the lead, the 249th reached the outskirts of Toropets on January 19, soon joined by the 48th Rifle Brigade. By 1400 hours on the next day the railway station and depot had been seized, just as the 39th Rifle Brigade and 360th Rifle Division joined the fight. Toropets was completely cleared of German forces by 1000 hours on January 21, and the haul of captured equipment and goods was immense: six tanks; hundreds of infantry weapons; 723 motor vehicles; 450,000 artillery shells; several million rounds of small arms ammunition; a thousand drums of fuel; and, most importantly, no fewer than 40 warehouses of food to feed many thousands of famished Red Army men.

On January 23 the 4th Shock Army was transferred to Kalinin Front. On January 30 the 249th and the 51st Rifle Brigade were ordered to advance on Vitebsk, but by this time no more than 1,400 "bayonets" (infantry and sappers) remained in the division. The division began an advance on this city, bypassing Surazh and leaving the 51st to blockade it. But German reserves were gathering and the 51st was pushed back, leaving the 249th under threat of encirclement. The units of the Army advancing on Rudnya and Demidov were also thrown back. By February 6 the position of 4th Shock Army had stabilized. The 3rd and 4th Shock Armies, who had started on a front of 100km, now manned a front over 500km long. On February 16, in recognition of its victories during the offensive, the 249th was redesignated as the 16th Guards Rifle Division. On March 16 it was further recognized with the award of the Order of Lenin.

== 2nd Formation ==
A new division, originally designated as the 2nd Estonian Rifle Division, began forming on February 10, 1942 in the Chelyabinsk Oblast of the Urals Military District. On February 28 it was finally re-designated as the 249th Estonian Rifle Division. Its order of battle was very similar to that of the 1st formation:

- 917th Rifle Regiment
- 921st Rifle Regiment
- 925th Rifle Regiment
- 779th Artillery Regiment
- 307th Antitank Battalion
- 328th Reconnaissance Company
- 417th Sapper Battalion
- 669th Signal Battalion (later 197th Signal Company)
- 267th Medical/Sanitation Battalion
- 243rd Chemical Defense (Anti-gas) Company
- 75th Motor Transport Company
- 325th Field Bakery
- 288th Divisional Veterinary Hospital (later 939th)
- 1883rd Field Postal Station
- 1194th Field Office of the State Bank

The division was recruited from Estonians who had fled eastwards in front of the German invasion, including members of the Communist Party of Estonia. Recruitment was slow given a restricted manpower pool; by early March there were only 3,000 men on strength and the first commander, Maj. Gen. Lembit Abramovich Pern, was not designated until May 6. This officer left the 249th to take command of the 7th Estonian Rifle Division exclusively on June 23; he would later command 8th Estonian Rifle Corps for most of its existence. He was replaced in command of the 249th by Maj. Karl Karlovich Kanger, who was in turn replaced by Col. Artur-Aleksandr Yosipovich Saueselg on September 29. Eventually over half of the division's personnel were descendants of Estonians who had emigrated to Russia in the previous century, while most of the rest were non-Estonians. The division stayed in the Urals until September, then was shipped to the Moscow Military District where it joined the 7th Estonian and the 19th Guards Rifle Divisions to form the 8th Estonian Corps, in accordance with a directive from the STAVKA to that Front's commander, Lt. Gen. M. A. Purkaev, on October 13:

"... 2. In the Front's reserve in the Soblago region - the 8th Estonian Corps, consisting of the corps headquarters, the 7th and 249th Estonian Rifle Divisions and the 19th Guards Rifle Division. The corps is beginning to move following the 5th Guards Rifle Corps from the Yegorevska region and the 19th Guards Rifle Division from the Volkhov Front. This corps will not be employed without the STAVKA's permission."

The 249th entered the active front on November 6 and remained in 8th Estonian Corps for the duration of the war.

== Battle of Velikiye Luki ==
At the beginning of December, as the battle for Velikiye Luki was underway, the 8th Corps was still in the reserves of Kalinin Front. Within two weeks it was subordinated to 3rd Shock Army and committed to the battle to reduce the encircled garrison of the city, but most of this fighting was done by the two Estonian divisions while the 19th Guards was attached to 5th Guards Corps as of December 12, holding off the German attempts to relieve the garrison, which included the 43rd Estonian Police Battalion. By the end of December the 7th and 249th Estonian Divisions, with the help of the 257th and 357th Rifle Divisions, had taken most of the city; the defenders continued to hold around the railway station and in the old fortress area. On December 29 Colonel Saueselg was removed from command due to poor performance and was replaced by Col. Yogan Yakovlevich Lombak; this officer would continue in command for most of the rest of the war, being promoted to the rank of major general on May 18, 1943.

Between January 4-12, 1943 the 3rd Panzer Army made its last effort to break through to the garrison, but was stopped some 3km short. On January 17 the city was finally cleared, with some 4,000 prisoners taken. The 249th's first battle was costly, and in spite of receiving the 162nd Machinegun Battalion and a training battalion as replacements in December, by the end of the battle it was at about 50 percent strength, with a total of 4,213 officers and men. It slowly rebuilt over the following months, and by June it was recorded that its personnel were 63 percent Estonian. As of October 1 the 8th Corps, with the two Estonian divisions under command, was directly under Front command.

=== Battle for Novosokolniki ===
On September 22 the Front commander, Army Gen. A. I. Yeryomenko, had submitted a proposal to the STAVKA for its future role, which included:

6. In order to guarantee the plan is fulfilled I request:
(a) Permit 8th Estonian Corps to relieve two rifle divisions on 3rd Shock Army's front for participation in the offensive.

Two days later, the STAVKA approved the plan, with amendments, including that the Estonian Corps would remain in Front reserve. Yeryomenko went on to win an important battle at Nevel, beginning on October 6, without the participation of the 7th and 249th Divisions.

Even before this, the STAVKA issued orders to create a new Baltic Front (later 2nd Baltic Front) by October 20, to consist of 3rd Shock, 11th, 22nd, 20th, 6th Guards, 11th Guards, and 15th Air Army, plus 8th Corps. This formation was to "launch an offensive no later than 15 October, with the mission to defeat the enemy's northern grouping and prevent it from withdrawing to Dvinsk and Riga." The Front was ordered to deliver its main attack in "the general direction of Riga, Idritsa, Ludza, Gulbene and Valga" and "subsequently, reach the Pskov, Vygua, Valga, and Valmiera line". At the same time, Kalinin Front was to attack in the general direction of Vitebsk and Riga. The new Front was under command of Army Gen. M. M. Popov. On October 20 Baltic Front was redesignated as 2nd Baltic Front, and Kalinin Front became 1st Baltic Front.

In order to begin this offensive the town of Novosokolniki, west of Velikiye Luki, had to be taken. This was where 3rd Shock had culminated its offensive in January. The chief of staff of 2nd Baltic Front, Lt. Gen. L. M. Sandalov, described these actions:

The 22nd Army of the very experienced Lieutenant General V. A. Iushkevich, whom I knew from the Civil War, conducted an operation north of the town of Novosokol'niki.
Units from three of that army's divisions tried to destroy the garrison of Novosokol'niki and capture that town and the large railroad junction. [8th Estonian Rifle Corps' 7th and 249th Rifle Divisions and 178th Rifle Division conducted this assault.]
The 1st Shock and 22nd Armies' forces were not able to fulfill their missions completely. The German-Fascist command transferred five divisions to this axis from other front sectors. The enemy resistance, which was based on a previously prepared defense system, increased sharply. By 5 November our force's advance had been brought to a complete halt.

The remainder of the plan to advance on Riga collapsed at about the same time. By the beginning of December the 8th Corps was in the reserves of 2nd Baltic Front. Novosokolniki would finally be liberated on January 29, 1944.

== Into the Baltics ==
At the end of 1943 the 779th Artillery Regiment still had most of its weapons, organized in five batteries of 76mm cannons and three batteries of 122mm howitzers. The latter were towed by 2.5 ton Studebaker trucks, the former by 6-horse teams, but the fighting around Novosokolniki had almost immobilized the regiment, and several batteries had no horses left at all.

In February 1944, 8th Corps was reassigned to the reserves of Leningrad Front, following the breaking of the German siege of that city and that Front's advance towards the Baltic States. Once the 249th entered Estonia it could draw on the local population for replacements. By August it was at a strength of 7,946 officers and men, making it a very strong rifle division for that stage of the war. In September, 8th Corps became part of 8th Army, which was clearing the coasts of Estonia and Latvia as well as the islands offshore. On October 6, the 1st Battalion of the 925th Rifle Regiment, along with the 328th Reconnaissance Company, staged an amphibious assault on Muhu Island, mounted on US Lend Lease DUKW amphibious trucks of the 283rd Special Purpose Truck Battalion. Two men of the 925th, Lt. Albert Gustavovich Repson, a platoon commander of the 925th, and Jr. Sgt. Nikolai Nikolaevich Matyashin, a machine gunner of the same regiment, were named as Heroes of the Soviet Union for this operation.

After returning to the mainland the 249th took part in the liberation of the Estonian capital, Tallinn, on September 22, and would be awarded the Order of the Red Banner on October 22. On December 16 several subunits of the division received decorations for their roles in the amphibious operation that took Saaremaa. The 921st Rifle Regiment was awarded the Order of the Red Banner, the 779th Artillery Regiment was given the Order of Kutuzov, 3rd Degree, the 307th Antitank Battalion won the Order of Alexander Nevsky, and the 917th and 925th Rifle Regiments each received the Order of the Red Star.

=== Courland Pocket ===
In February 1945, 8th Corps returned to 2nd Baltic Front, now in Lithuania, coming under direct command of the Front. General Lombak left the division on March 3; he would go on to command the 118th Rifle Division postwar, before serving in a number of military and governmental posts in the Estonian SSR until 1959. He was replaced by Col. Avgust Yulianovich Feldman for the duration of the war. This officer had been the division's deputy commander since September 1942. On March 17 a strength return showed the 249th still with 8,996 officers and men, nearly twice the strength of the average 1945 Red Army rifle division. During that month the division, with its corps, was reassigned to the 42nd Army in the Courland Group of Forces of Leningrad Front, helping to keep guard over the German forces trapped in the Courland Pocket. Nearly two months after the German surrender, on June 28, the 8th Estonian Rifle Corps became the 41st Guards Rifle Corps, and the 249th Estonian Rifle Division was renamed the 122nd Guards Rifle Division.
