= 70th Army =

- 70-я армия
- Active: October 1942 – August 1945
- Country: Soviet Union
- Branch: Red Army
- Type: Infantry
- Size: Field army
- Part of: Central Front; 1st Belorussian Front; 2nd Belorussian Front
- Engagements: Battle of Kursk; Lower Dnieper Offensive; Operation Bagration; Lublin-Brest Offensive; East Pomeranian Offensive; Berlin Strategic Offensive

The 70th Army (Russian: 70-я армия) was a Soviet field army during World War II. It was the highest-numbered combined arms army to be formed by the Stavka during the war. It was active at the Battle of Kursk, the Lublin–Brest Offensive, and the Berlin Strategic Offensive, among other actions.

== Formation ==
The army began forming in October 1942 near Sverdlovsk in Siberia as a separate NKVD Army of the Reserve of the Supreme High Command (Stavka Reserve). It was recruited primarily from NKVD border guards, with other redundant manpower from lines of communications troops and GULAG personnel.

In a decree signed by Marshal G. K. Zhukov the army became part of the Red Army:

"The Stavka of the Supreme High Command orders:

1. Name the Separate Army formed by the People's Commissariat of Internal Affairs of the USSR, consisting of six rifle divisions, with separate reinforcing and support units, the 70th Army and include it in the Red Army on 1 February.
2. Give the formations of the 70th Army the following designations:

- The 102nd Far Eastern Rifle Division,
- The 106th Trans-Baikal Rifle Division,
- The 140th Siberian Rifle Division,
- The 162nd Central Asian Rifle Division,
- The 175th Ural Rifle Division,
- The 181st Stalingrad Rifle Division

3. Determine the numbering and table of organization and composition of the units of 70th Army in accordance with the instructions of the Chief of the Red Army Glavupraform."

The reinforcing and support units included the 27th Separate Tank Regiment and 378th Anti-Tank Regiment.

70th Army was assigned to the re-deploying Don Front (soon re-designated Central Front) under command of Col. Gen. K. K. Rokossovskii. It was some time before Rokossovskii could knock it into shape as a front-line formation, forcing him to remove many senior, ex-NKVD officers. From 28 February the 70th Army took part in both offensive and defensive operations to the northwest of Kursk. Central Front exploited a gap between the weak Second German Army and the Second Panzer Army, but was brought to a halt by the spring rasputitsa, German reserves released by their evacuation of the Rzhev Salient, and the German counter-offensive to the south. The Front's armies created defenses in depth during the lull in operations during the spring.

On 1 July 1943, the army included the 28th Rifle Corps (132nd, 211th, 280th Rifle Divisions), the 102nd, 106th, 140th, 162nd and 175th Rifle Divisions, and the 3rd Destroyer (antitank) Brigade (2nd Destroyer Division). The 3rd Destroyer Brigade several decades afterwards became the 152nd Rocket Brigade and still serves in Kaliningrad. The army also had artillery forces and the 240th, 251st, and 259th Independent Tank Regiments.

== Battle of Kursk ==
During the Battle of Kursk the 70th Army fought on the left flank of the 2nd Tank Army and played a role in stopping the German 9th Army that was trying to break through to Kursk from the north. During the subsequent Red Army counterattack, the 70th Army took part in Operation Kutuzov and attacked Trosna to the south of the town of Kromy. On 5 Aug., its units reached the region southwest of Kromy, and on 17 Aug., they reached the German "Hagen" defense line near Domakha.

After the end of this operation, the field headquarters of the 70th Army was transferred to the Reserve of the Central Front and on 1 Feb. to the Reserve of the Supreme High Command, where it received new units.

== Lublin-Brest operation ==
During the second half of February 1944, the 70th Army was transferred to the front at the Turya River north of Kovel. On 25 Feb., it was subordinated to the Belorussian Front and on 16 Apr. it joined that formation, which had been re-designated 1st Belorussian Front. In June, prior to the outbreak of the Soviet summer offensive, the Army was still in the vicinity of Kovel, and its order of battle was as follows:

- 96th Rifle Corps (38th Guards and 1st Rifle Divisions)
- 114th Rifle Corps (76th Guards and 160th Rifle Divisions)
- 376th Anti-tank Artillery Regt., 581st Anti-Aircraft Regt., 136th Guards Mortar Regt., 148th Gun Artillery Brigade, and supporting units.

With just four rifle divisions, this was a small army by Soviet standards. It also contained the 3rd Sniper Battalion.

During the Lublin–Brest Offensive (18 July – 2 August), its units, along with units of the 61st Army and the 26th Army, surrounded Brest from the south-east and destroyed up to four German divisions to the west of Brest.

== Poland ==
After a short period assigned to the front reserves, on 10 Aug. the 70th Army attacked a region to the north of Warsaw. By the end of August, it reached the Narew River near the town of Serock. As of 26 Aug. was reduced to just the 72nd Rifle Corps. On 29 Oct., the 70th Army was back again as reserves of the 1st Belorussian Front and on 19 Nov. as reserves of the 2nd Belorussian Front.

== Germany ==
During the East Prussian Offensive (13 January to 25 April), 70th Army attacked from the Serock bridgehead towards Modlin, Płock, and Toruń (Thorn). During three days of fighting, its units broke through the German defenses. On 18 January, they captured Modlin and Modlin Fortress. On 25 January, elements of 70th Army reached the fortified city of Toruń. At the same time other units of 70th Army reached the Vistula River north-east of Bromberg (Bydgoszcz) and crossed the river against opposition. On 10 February, the 70th Army reduced the defenders in Thorn. 70th Army, together with other armies of the front and forces of Baltic Fleet, took part in the East Pomeranian Offensive (10 February – 4 April 1945). The operation captured the city, port, and military naval base of Gdynia on 28 March and the naval base at Danzig (Gdansk) on 30 March. In the beginning of April 1945, 70th Army was transferred to the front reserve. At this time the army had the 66th Guards SU Brigade attached, the Red Army's only heavy SU brigade, a potent force of 60 ISU-122 self-propelled guns. On 15 April it was sent to the region of Wittstock, Naugard (Nowogard), and Sztuchow.

During the Battle of Berlin (16 April – 8 May), 70th Army was attached to the spearheads of 2nd Belorussian Front, attacking on the Neubrandenburg – Wismar axis. On 1 May, it captured the cities of Rostock and Teterow. On the evening of 3 May, its units reached the Baltic Sea coastline near Wismar and received orders to guard and defend the coastline near Stettin (Szczecin).

== Post war ==
After the war, the headquarters of the Army was transferred to Chkalov (Orenburg). In October 1945, the field headquarters and its staff was used to create the headquarters of the South Urals Military District.

== Commanders ==
- Major General German Tarasov (October 1942 – April 1943)
- Lieutenant General Ivan Galanin (April – September 1943
- Major General Vladimir Sharapov (September – October 1943)
- Lieutenant General Aleksei Grechkin (October - November 1943)
- Lieutenant General Ivan Nikolaev (January 1944 – March 1944)
- Major General Alexander Ryzhov (March – May 1944)
- Colonel General Vasily Popov (May 1944 to the end of the war)

Members of the War Council of the Army

- Colonel from March 1943 Major General N.N. Savkov (October 1942 to the end of the war)

Chiefs of Staff

- Major General Vladimir Sharapov (October 1942 – November 1943)
- Colonel G.M.Abayev (November 1942 – February 1944)
- Major General P.I. Lyapin ( February 1944 – March 1945)
- Colonel A.P Penchevsky (March – April 1945)
- Major General S.I. Teteshkin (April 1945 to the end of the war)
