= 31st Army (Soviet Union) =

31st Army (1941–1945)
- 31-я армия
- Active: 15 July 1941 – September 1945
- Disbanded: September 1945
- Country: Soviet Union
- Branch: Red Army
- Type: Combined arms
- Size: Field Army
- Part of: Moscow Military District; Reserve Front; Western Front; Kalinin Front; 3rd Belorussian Front; 1st Ukrainian Front
- Engagements: Battle of Moscow; Rzhev-Vyazma Strategic Offensive; Rzhev-Sychevka Strategic Offensive; Smolensk Strategic Offensive; Vitebsk Offensive; Operation Bagration; Gumbinnen Operation; East Prussian Offensive; Prague Operation

Commanders
- Notable commanders: See List

The 31st Army (Russian: 31-я армия) was a field army of the Red Army during the Second World War.

== Formation ==
The army was formed on 15 July 1941 within the Moscow Military District Moscow Military District. It was tasked with establishing a defensive line along the Ostashkov - Selizharovo - Rzhev axis. In this deployment, the army was positioned between the 27th Army to the north and the 49th Army to the south.

The 31st Army initially comprised the following:

- 244th Rifle Division
- 246th Rifle Division
- 247th Rifle Division
- 249th Rifle Division

On 1 August 1941, it was assigned to the Reserve Front, adding the following units:

119th Rifle Division
110th Tank Division
43rd Corps Artillery Regiment
766th Antitank Artillery Regiment
537th Miner-Sapper Battalion

On 30 July 1941, the army was reassigned to the Reserve Front, and its defensive line was repositioned along the Ostashkov - Yeltsy - Tishina River River line. The army entered combat operations on 2 October 1941. At that time, its composition was as follows:

5th Rifle Division
110th Rifle Division
119th Rifle Division
247th Rifle Division
249th Rifle Division
296th Machine-Gun Artillery Battalion
297th Machine-Gun Artillery Battalion
43rd Corps Artillery Regiment
336th Corps Artillery Regiment
766th Antitank Artillery Regiment
873rd Antitank Artillery Regiment
199th Naval Artillery Battalion
282nd Naval Gun Battery
537th Miner-Sapper Battalion

== History ==
=== 1941 ===
The 31st Army first engaged the Germans on 2 October 1941 during Operation Typhoon. On 6 October, units of the army were formed a task force under the command of Major General Vitaly Polenov, and along with a task force from 19th Army under the command of Lieutenant General Ivan Boldin, were ordered to break the German advance on Volokolamsk and Rzhev. On 7 October, the first snow fell, turning the roads into mud and forcing the 3rd Panzer Group's advance to a halt. The snowy conditions allowed the army to set up defensive positions along the Zhuravlyovo − Bolshoye Yakovtsevo − Ivashkovo line and form a corridor for retreating Soviet units. This began the Kalinin Defensive Operation phase of the Moscow Strategic Defensive operations.

On 10 October, the 110th Tank Division was detached and ordered to Rzhev.

On 19 October, the army was reduced to the following:

119th Rifle Division
183rd Rifle Division
46th Cavalry Division
54th Cavalry Division
8th Tank Brigade and
Motorized Rifle Brigade of the Kalinin Front

Between 19 and 22 October, the army engaged German forces that had broken through into the Mednoye region. During this period, it was reinforced by the 113th and 252nd Rifle Divisions. On 22 October, the army was ordered to launch an offensive in cooperation with the 29th and 30th Armies to liberate the city of Kalinin. Although the operation did not succeed in recapturing the city, it diverted significant German forces away from Moscow.

On 5 December, as part of the Moscow Strategic Offensive, the Kalinin Front began the Kalinin offensive. Overcoming stubborn resistance and repeated counterattacks, the 29th and 31st Armies had encircled the German forces occupying Kalinin by 15 December, and on 16 December, the 31st Army liberated the city.

=== 1942 ===
On 7 January 1942, troops of the 39th, 29th, 31st and 30th Armies reached the prepared defensive lines north of Rzhev near Lotoshino.

From 8 January 8 to 20 April, the army participated in the Rzhev-Vyazma Strategic Offensive. On 20 April, the army moved into defensive positions east of Zubtsov.

On 23 July, the army was assigned to the Western Front and took part in the Battle of Rzhev from 30 July to 23 August, liberating Zubstov on 23 August.

From 25 November to 20 December, the army participated in Operation Mars.

=== 1943 ===
On 20 March 1943, the army crossed the Dnieper River, despite the complications of the spring thaw breaking up the river's ice. On 22 March, the army attempted to go on the offensive in the direction of Safonovo and Yartsevo, but was unable to break through the German defenses, and by the end of March, the commander decided to stop the offensive and go on the defensive.

The composition of the army as of 1 August 1943 was as follows:

- 36th Rifle Corps
  - 215th Rifle Division
  - 274th Rifle Division
  - 359th Rifle Division
- 45th Rifle Corps
  - 88th Rifle Division
  - 220th Rifle Division
  - 331st Rifle Division
- 71st Rifle Corps (Headquarters only)
- 82nd Rifle Division
- 133rd Rifle Division
- 251st Rifle Division
- 392nd Gun Artillery Regiment
- 542nd Gun Artillery Regiment
- 644th Gun Artillery Regiment
- 646th Gun Artillery Regiment
- 529th Tank Destroyer Regiment
- 873rd Tank Destroyer Regiment
- 549th Mortar Regiment
- 341st Antiaircraft Artillery Regiment
- 1269th Antiaircraft Artillery Regiment
- 1478th Antiaircraft Artillery Regiment
- 2nd Guard Motorcycle Regiment
- 72nd Engineer Battalion
- 291st Engineer Battalion

On 7 August, the army went on the offensive during Operation Suvorov, part of the Smolensk Strategic Offensive. The army achieved only a limited advance on the German lines. After repelling multiple German counterattacks, the offensive was suspended on 11 August. After regrouping its forces, the army resumed the offensive on 16 August. However, the forces were unable to advance even a mile and the offensive was again suspended on 20 August.

The army resumed the offensive on 30 August. During the day, the army advanced approximately 400 meters; in the evening, the German troops began to withdraw. The Soviet pursuit of the German forces began at dawn of 31 August with the crossing of the river Vopets. By evening, the army liberated 90 settlements, including the village of Safonovo. After a week of retreating, the German forces managed to consolidate a defensive line near Yartsevo. On 7 September, the army went on the defensive.

The offensive was resumed on 15 September, crossing the Vop River. In conjunction with the 5th and 68th Armies, the army liberated Smolensk on 25 September.

=== 1944 ===
From February to March, the army participated in the Brest Offensive.

By the start of Operation Bagration, the army consisted of the following:

- 36th Rifle Corps
  - 220th Rifle Division
  - 352nd Rifle Division
- 71st Rifle Corps
  - 88th Rifle Division
  - 192nd Rifle Division
  - 331st Rifle Division
- 113th Rifle Corps
  - 62nd Rifle Division
  - 174th Rifle Division
- 173rd Rifle Division
- 140th Gun Artillery Brigade
- 392nd Corps Gun Artillery Regiment
- 570th Corps Gun Artillery Regiment
- 83rd Guards Howitzer Artillery Regiment
- 43rd Antitank Artillery Brigade
- 529th Tank Destroyer Regiment
- 549th Mortar Regiment
- 74th Guards Mortar Regiment
- 2nd Separate Artillery Observation Balloon Battalion
- 66th Anti aircraft Artillery Division
  - 1981st Anti aircraft Artillery Regiment
  - 1985th Anti aircraft Artillery Regiment
  - 1989th Anti aircraft Artillery Regiment
  - 1993rd Anti aircraft Artillery Regiment
- 1275th Anti aircraft Artillery Regiment
- 1478th Anti aircraft Artillery Regiment
- 1481st Anti aircraft Artillery Regiment
- 525th Anti aircraft Artillery Battalion
- 213th Tank Brigade
- 926th SU Regiment
- 927th SU Regiment
- 959th SU Regiment
- 1445th SU Regiment
- 52nd Armored Train Battalion
- 90th Pontoon-Bridge Battalion (8th Pontoon-Bridge Brigade)
- 14th Flamethrower Battalion
- 15th Flamethrower Battalion

Assigned to the 3rd Belorussian Front, the army participated in the offensive against German forces in the Minsk Offensive, encircling a group of German forces. In addition to the 31st Army, the 2nd Belorussian Front's 33rd, 49th and 50th Armies were ordered to contain the German forces within the encirclement and defeat German groups in the surrounding area.

The elimination of the German forces escaping from the city occurred in three phases:

- 5–7 July – The scattering of the German group and suppression of an organized breakout from the encirclement. Having suffered heavy losses by the surrender of the city, the German forces broke up into several disorganized groups and made a disorganized attempt to break out of the encirclement.
- 8–9 July – The destruction of disparate groups that had taken refuge in the forests southeast of Minsk.
- 10–13 July – Soviet troops combed the woods, capturing any remaining small groups.

By the end of the summer, the 3rd Belorussian Front and the 31st Army had reached the border of East Prussia.

=== 1945 ===
The army took part in the East Prussian Offensive under the command of the 3rd Belorussian Front. In early April, army was transferred to the 1st Ukrainian Front to participate in the Prague Offensive.

By the end of the war, the army comprised the following:

- 36th Rifle Corps
  - 173rd Rifle Division
  - 176th Rifle Division
  - 352nd Rifle Division
- 44th Rifle Corps
  - 62nd Rifle Division
  - 174th Rifle Division
  - 220th Rifle Division
- 71st Rifle Corps
  - 54th Rifle Division
  - 88th Rifle Division
  - 331st Rifle Division
- 140th Gun Artillery Brigade
- 51st Guards Tank Destroyer Regiment
- 357th Guards Tank Destroyer Regiment
- 529th Tank Destroyer Regiment
- 549th Mortar Regiment
- 1478th Antiaircraft Artillery Regiment
- 926th SU Regiment
- 959th SU Regiment
- 31st Engineer-Sapper Brigade

The army was disbanded in early September 1945.

== Commanders ==
- Major General Vasily Dalmatov – (15 July – 13 October 1941)
- Major General Vasily Yushkevich – (17 October 1941 – 19 March 1942)
- Major General Vladimir Vostrukhov – (19 March – 14 April 1942)
- Major General Vitaly Polenov – (15 April 1942 – 27 February 1943)
- Major General Vladimir Gluzdovsky – (27 February 1943 – 27 May 1944)
- Lieutenant General Vasily Glagolev – (27 May – 15 December 1944)
- Lieutenant General Pyotr Shafranov – (15 December 1944 – 11 May 1945)

== See also ==
- List of Soviet armies
