= 3rd Belorussian Front =

WW2 Soviet Red Army formation

- 3-й Белорусский фронт
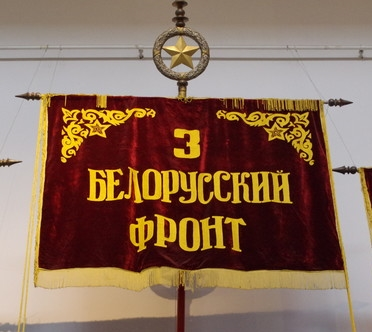
- Standard of the 3rd Belorussian Front
- Active: 24 April 1944 – 15 August 1945
- Country: Soviet Union
- Branch: Red Army
- Type: Front
- Size: 708,600 (January 1945)
- Engagements: World War II: Eastern Front; Operation Bagration; Baltic Offensive; East Prussian Offensive

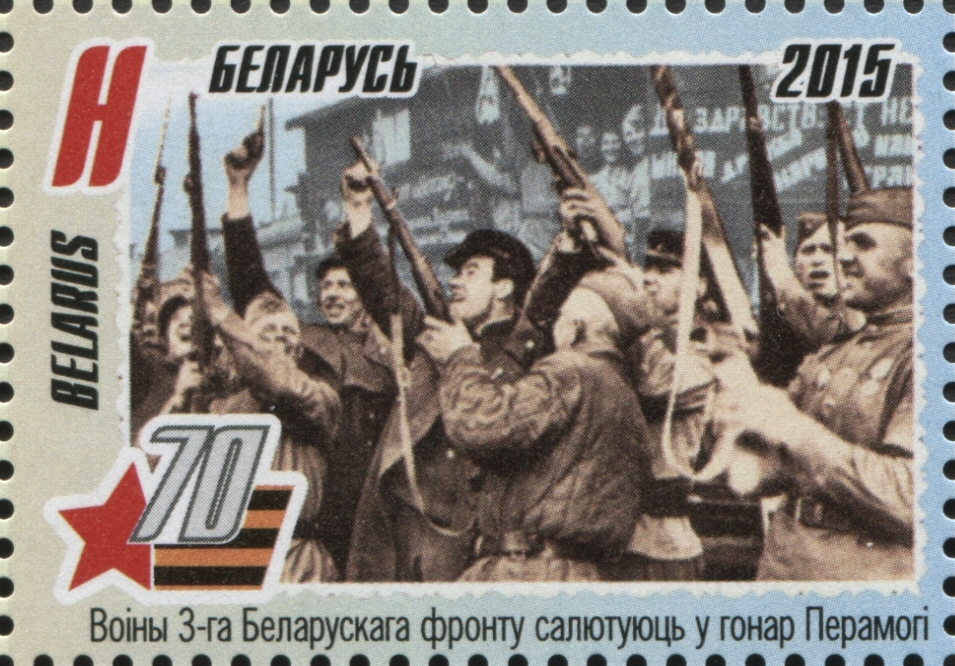
Warriors of the 3rd Belorussian Front salute near the city of Pillau. 70 years of Victory. Stamp of Belarus, 2015

The 3rd Belorussian Front (Russian: 3-й Белорусский фронт) was a Front of the Red Army during the Second World War.

The 3rd Belorussian Front was created on 24 April 1944 from forces previously assigned to the Western Front. Over 381 days in combat, the 3rd Belorussian Front suffered 166,838 killed, 9,292 missing, and 667,297 wounded, sick, and frostbitten personnel while advancing from the region some 50 kilometers southeast of Vitebsk in Russia to Königsberg in East Prussia.

Operations the 3rd Belorussian Front took part in, include the Belorussian Offensive Operation, the Baltic Offensive Operation and the East Prussian Offensive Operation. Although costly, the advance of the 3rd Belorussian Front was in great part victorious, with one of the few defeats occurring during the Gumbinnen Operation in October 1944.

The 3rd Belorussian Front was formally disbanded on 15 August 1945.

3rd Belorussian Front composition, July 1944
Army	Number and type of divisions	Independent brigades
5th	9 rifle divisions 1 artillery division 1 anti-aircraft division	1 gun-artillery brigade 1 antitank brigade 2 tank brigades 1 assault sapper brigade 1 sapper brigade
11th Guards	9 rifle divisions 2 anti-aircraft divisions 1 tank corps	1 gun-artillery brigade 1 "BM" howitzer artillery brigade 1 antitank brigade 2 rocket launcher brigades 1 tank brigade 1 assault sapper brigade 1 sapper brigade
31st	8 rifle divisions 1 anti-aircraft division	1 gun-artillery brigade 1 antitank brigade 1 tank brigade 1 sapper brigade
5th Guards Tank	2 tank corps 1 anti-aircraft division	-
1st Air	6 bomber divisions 8 fighter divisions 4 close support divisions 1 night bomber division	-
Front HQ	3 cavalry divisions 3 artillery divisions 1 anti-aircraft division 1 mechanized corps	1 "BM" howitzer artillery brigade 1 rocket launcher brigade 1 assault sapper brigade 1 motorized sapper brigade 1 engineer bridging brigade

== Commanders ==
- Colonel General Ivan Chernyakhovsky [promoted to full General on 26 June 1944] (April 1944 – February 1945)
- Marshal of the Soviet Union Aleksandr Vasilevsky (February–April 1945)
- General Hovhannes Bagramyan (April–August 1945)
