= 84th Guards Rifle Division =

- Active: 1943–1946
- Country: Soviet Union
- Branch: Red Army
- Type: Division
- Role: Infantry
- Engagements: Operation Kutuzov; Bryansk Offensive; Polotsk-Vitebsk Offensive; Vitebsk (Gorodok) Offensive; Operation Bagration; Vitebsk-Orsha Offensive; Minsk Offensive; Vilnius-Kaunas Offensive; Goldap-Gumbinnen Operation; Vistula-Oder Offensive; East Prussian Offensive; Heiligenbeil Pocket; Siege of Königsberg; Samland Offensive
- Decorations: Order of the Red Banner; Order of Suvorov
- Battle honours: Karachev

Commanders
- Notable commanders: Maj. Gen. Georgii Borisovich Peters; Maj. Gen. Ivan Kuzmich Shcherbina

The 84th Guards Rifle Division was reformed as an elite infantry division of the Red Army in April 1943, based on the 2nd formation of the 110th Rifle Division, and served in that role until after the end of the Great Patriotic War. Throughout its combat path it was considered a "sister" to the 83rd Guards Rifle Division.

It was redesignated after the relatively minor battles along the front held by the 16th Army north of the Oryol salient during most of 1942 and into early 1943. Under a STAVKA directive of April 16 that Army was officially redesignated as the 11th Guards Army on May 1, 1943. The division was not immediately assigned to a corps command but soon joined the 36th Guards Rifle Corps and it would serve under these headquarters for the duration of the war. It re-entered the fighting in July during the offensive for the liberation of the Oryol region and in the process earned a battle honor. By early autumn the entire Army was moved northward, becoming part of the 2nd Baltic Front before moving to the 1st Baltic Front. The 84th Guards saw combat in the slow and bloody battles east and north of Vitebsk through the winter during which it was awarded the Order of Suvorov as a result of the fighting north of Gorodok in December. Early during the summer offensive against Army Group Center, now as part of 3rd Belorussian Front, the division further distinguished itself in crossing the Neman River and shortly after received the Order of the Red Banner. It then took part in the advance through Lithuania and into East Prussia, taking part in the siege and capture of Königsberg before moving with its Army to the Zemland Group of Forces and spending the last weeks of the war mopping up German resistance in the Baltic ports. Despite an admirable record the 84th Guards was gradually disbanded from mid-1945 to mid-1946.

== Formation ==
The 84th Guards was redesignated on April 10, 1943 in recognition of the 110th Rifle Division's steadfast qualities in positional fighting north of the Oryol salient through most of 1942 and early 1943, as well as its role in the liberation of Vyasma on March 12. It officially received its Guards banner on May 25. At that time its order of battle became as follows:

- 243rd Guards Rifle Regiment (from 1287th Rifle Regiment)
- 245th Guards Rifle Regiment (from 1289th Rifle Regiment)
- 247th Guards Rifle Regiment (from 1291st Rifle Regiment)
- 186th Guards Artillery Regiment (from 971st Artillery Regiment)
- 88th Guards Antitank Battalion (later 88th Guards Self-Propelled Artillery Battalion)
- 85th Guards Reconnaissance Company
- 93rd Guards Sapper Battalion
- 115th Guards Signal Battalion
- 87th Guards Medical/Sanitation Battalion
- 86th Guards Chemical Defense (Anti-gas) Company
- 89th Guards Motor Transport Company
- 82nd Guards Field Bakery
- 83rd Guards Divisional Veterinary Hospital
- 754th Field Postal Station
- 599th Field Office of the State Bank

The division continued under the command of Maj. Gen. Georgii Borisovich Peters, who had commanded the 110th since November 11, 1942. As of the beginning of June it was a separate division of Lt. Gen. I. Kh. Bagramyan's 11th Guards Army on the southern flank of Western Front. The former militia divisions such as the 110th were well-regarded for their courage and sacrifice in the face of the German onslaught in 1941:

The 84th Guards Division (commanded by Major General Georgii Borisovich Peters) was formed in the Kuybyshevsky district of Moscow as the 4th Moscow Division of the People's Militia [Narodnoe Opolcheniye]. It entered the battle in July 1941 and at the front received regular divisional numbering, becoming the 110th. The fighters of this unit fought south of Naro-Fominsk - on the Kiev highway, and the fact that the Nazis did not pass here is their great merit. The division later liberated Naro-Fominsk, Borovsk, Vereya and was transformed into a guards division on April 10, 1943... - Marshal of the Soviet Union I. Kh. Bagramyan, This is How We Went to Victory, - M: Military Publishing, 1977, p. 193

The division was one of five of the original twelve Moscow volunteer divisions that eventually gained Guards status.

== Operation Kutuzov ==
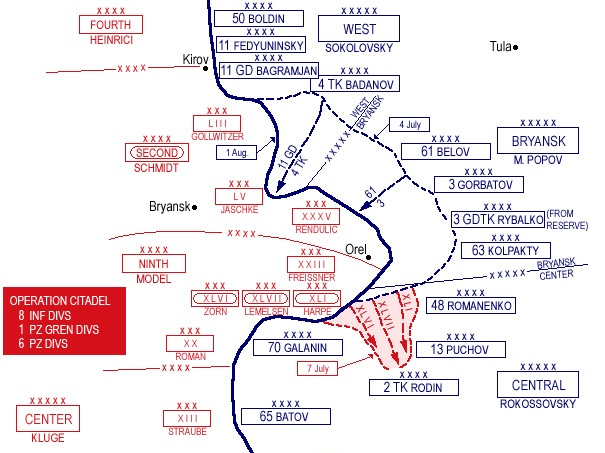
Operation Kutuzov. Note position of 11th Guards Army.

The German Operation Zitadelle officially ended on July 12, the same day that forces of Western and Bryansk Fronts struck the positions of the 2nd Panzer Army on the north flank of the Oryol salient. By now the 84th Guards had been assigned to the 36th Guards Rifle Corps which also contained the 5th and 18th Guards Rifle Divisions. The division would serve under this Corps for the duration of the war. The division was one of four that the Army had deployed in its second echelon. Within 36th Guards Corps the 18th Guards was in first echelon with the 213th Tank Brigade, 84th Guards in second and 5th Guards in third; the Corps was supported by two artillery and one Guards Mortar regiments.

Following a massive preparatory bombardment 11th Guards Army achieved a deep penetration at the boundary between the German 211th and 293rd Infantry Divisions. General Bagramyan committed his mobile forces in the afternoon and advanced about 10–12 km. Army Group Center hurriedly brought up the 5th Panzer Division to mount a counterattack in the evening, which was unsuccessful. 36th Guards Corps, operating as part of the Army's shock group along the Bolkhov axis, by the second day was attacking from the line from Dolgaya to Slobodka toward the southwest. 2nd Panzer Army had constructed strongpoints in the Sorokino–Ukolitsy area as a base to cut off any Soviet units that broke deeply into its defenses. Having formed a strike force based on elements of the 18th and 20th Panzer, 25th Panzergrenadier Division and remnants of the 293rd Infantry these units counterattacked on the morning of July 14 from the Sorokino area in the direction of Rechitsa. This was beaten off with heavy losses and 36th Guards Corps continued its offensive, forced a crossing of the Vytebet River and outflanked Sorokino from the northeast with the 18th Guards and from the southeast and south with the 84th Guards supported by the 43rd Guards Tank Brigade and the 2nd Guards Heavy Tank Regiment. Following a powerful artillery preparation Sorokino was attacked from the northeast and south and after stubborn fighting by 1100 hours on July 15 the German garrison had been completely destroyed. Meanwhile, the 5th Guards, which had been committed from behind the 84th Guards' right flank, outflanked Ukolitsy from the south. This took the German command by surprise, cut the road to Kireikovo and enveloped the eastern outskirts of Ukolitsy. The 84th followed up its victory at Sorokino by attacking the strongpoint from the west and northwest. By the morning of July 16 German resistance in Ukolitsy had been crushed and the two Guards divisions were in pursuit of remnants retreating southeast toward Kireikovo.

=== Battle for Kireikovo ===
During the day the 84th Guards, along with the 213th Tanks and in cooperation with units of 61st Army, outflanked Kireikovo from the north and east. Simultaneously the 5th Guards and 43rd Guards Tanks turned the village from the west, south and southeast and, having taken Dubenka, linked up with the left flank of the division, completing its encirclement. Kireikovo, an important road junction and German supply center, had been heavily fortified but its garrison was overwhelmed by the rapid Soviet manoeuvres and was largely destroyed when the village was liberated on the morning of July 17. During the pursuit of the defeated remnants units of 36th Guards Corps reached the line of the Mashok River.

As the front shortened at this time the 5th Guards was transferred to 8th Guards Corps and the 36th Guards Corps was moved to the wooded area north of Kamenka where it incorporated the 217th Rifle Division. The Corps was now to launch an attack in the direction of Gnezdilovo and Bogoroditskoe in conjunction with the 1st and 25th Tank Corps for the purpose the Oryol–Bryansk railroad and paved road and also to secure the flank of the 8th Guards Corps as it attacked toward Bolkhov. The two tank corps renewed their advances on July 18 while the 36th Guards Corps joined in the next morning and by the end of the day had reached a line from Peshkovo to Krasnikovo. Meanwhile, the 108th Rifle Division of 8th Guards Corps, in cooperation with the 5th Tank Corps, had cut the Blokhov - Khotynets road by July 19.

=== Battles for Bolkhov ===
On July 20 the Bolkhov group of German forces went over to the counterattack, soon clearing the road but failing to encircle and eliminate the 108th Division. These attacks continued until late on July 22 and forced Soviet withdrawals on several sectors but were halted by the 8th and 36th Guards Corps and the 25th Tanks. These forces renewed their offensive the next day and by the end of July 25 had reached a jumping-off point for a decisive attack to eliminate the German Bolkhov grouping in cooperation with 61st Army.

By July 26, after several delays, the 4th Tank Army had reached the front. 11th Guards Army was to break through the German defense with the 8th and 36th Guards Corps and create a breach for 4th Tanks, then follow in the direction of Borilovo. The assault began that day following a powerful one-hour artillery preparation but encountered a stubborn and well-organized defense and failed to break through. The Soviet command was forced to commit the 4th Tank Army to complete the breach while still facing a strong antitank defense which claimed many vehicles and limited the penetration to just 3km in depth. However the defenders were also shaken and overnight received orders to abandon Bolkhov while continuing to hold the road to Khotynets. Intense fighting continued into July 27 and two days later 11th Guards Army completed its breakthrough while 61st Army finished clearing Bolkhov. 36th Guards Corps and the 25th Tanks advanced slowly to the south in the face of fierce rearguard battles and by the end of July 30 were fighting along a line from outside Brezhnevskii to outside Proletarskii.

=== Battles for Khotynets ===
By the beginning of August the 11th Guards Army had been transferred to Bryansk Front. From July 31 to August 5 the Army, along with 4th Tank Army, was involved in stubborn fighting for control of the paved road and railroad between Oryol and Bryansk. By the morning of August 6 the 11th Guards had handed over its right-flank sector to 11th Army and had regrouped for an offensive on Khotynets. 36th Guards Corps occupied a start line on a 7km-wide sector from the Vytebet west of Ilinskoe to the northern outskirts of Brezhnevskii and was to attack with 1st Tanks in the direction of Studenka and Obraztsovo, outflanking Khotynets from the northwest and east. 11th Guards Army as a whole was to break through between Ilinskoe and Gnezdilovo to create a breach for 4th Tanks and then encircle and capture Khotynets before developing the offensive toward Karachev.

The renewed offensive began with reconnaissance operations by each first-echelon division at 0600 hours followed by an artillery and airstrike preparation at noon. The 8th and 36th Guards Corps with heavy tank support went over to the attack at 1300 and quickly broke through the forward edge of the German defense, which was soon falling back to its intermediate line. By 1530 hours the infantry had penetrated up to 3km and the 1st Tanks was committed. Late in the day the right-flank units of 36th Guards Corps were successfully advancing and reached the approaches to Klemenovo the next morning. Despite these initial successes the German forces used broken ground and village strongpoints to delay the offensive. On August 8 units of the 25th Panzergrenadiers appeared on the approaches to Khotynets. Further reserves arrived the next day and two armored trains were coursing along the railroad. Despite this, on August 9 fighting began on the immediate approaches to the town and individual strongpoints changed hands several times. By day's end elements of the 36th Guards Corps and the 1st Tanks were fighting along the outskirts of Abolmasovo, Voeikovo and Khotynets itself while units of 8th Guards Corps and 25th Tanks outflanked Khotynets from the south and cut the railroad. The town was now outflanked from three sides and on the morning of August 10 was completely cleared of German forces as remnants fell back to the west; the battle had cost them 7,500 officers and men, 70 armored vehicles and 176 guns and mortars. In the pursuit the next day the 36th Corps reached the eastern outskirts of Yurevo and straddled the Khotynets–Karachev road southeast of Yakovlevo.

The immediate fighting for Karachev began at 0300 hours on August 15. In order to hold the town, which was an important road junction and supply base, the German command had concentrated units of the 78th Assault Division and 38th Infantry Division plus remnants of the 253rd and 293rd Infantry, 18th and 8th Panzer Divisions and the 45th Security Regiment. 11th Guards Army committed the 16th Guards and 84th Guards Divisions against the town from the east and southeast. These were assisted in part by the 83rd Guards which attacked Karachev from the southeast and captured the strongpoints of Height 246.1 and Glybochka. The left-wing forces of 8th Guards Corps forced the Snezhet River after outflanking the town from the south. Having crushed German resistance along the surrounding heights and villages the Soviet forces broke into Karachev at 0830 hours and completely occupied it. In recognition of its role in the liberation of Karachev the 84th Guards Division was one of four that were awarded its name as an honorific.

== Into Belarus ==
Beginning on September 1 the 11th Guards Army took part in the operations that liberated Bryansk. On September 19, two days after the city was cleared, the Army began withdrawing from the front lines. Bryansk Front was disbanded on October 10 and the Army, along with the Front headquarters, moved northwest to be incorporated into the new Baltic Front (ten days later 2nd Baltic Front), but at noon on November 18 the 11th Guards was moved to 1st Baltic Front, which was now under command of General Bagramyan.

Given the complex situation in the Nevel region, where the 3rd and 4th Shock Armies had carved out a large salient behind the lines of German 16th Army (Army Group North) and 3rd Panzer Army (Army Group Center), Bagramyan planned an attack along the Gorodok–Vitebsk axis with 11th Guards Army. Its 36th and 16th Guards Rifle Corps would deliver the main attack toward Mekhovoe and Gorodok. 36th Guards Corps (now consisting of the 16th and 84th Guards and the 360th Rifle Division) was deployed in a single first echelon with all three divisions in line. In the event the STAVKA delayed the start of the offensive until November 26, but an unseasonal thaw forced a further delay into early December.

=== Battle for Gorodok ===
The offensive was finally able to proceed on December 13. 36th Guards Corps attacked the eastern side of the German-held Ezerishche salient north of Vitebsk, to the south of Lake Ezerishche, with the 84th Guards flanked by the 360th Division to its north and the 16th Guards to its south; its immediate objective was the village of Gurki on the Nevel–Gorodok railway. The initial goal of the offensive was to cut off the northwestern portion of the salient in cooperation with 4th Shock Army and destroy the German grouping southwest of the lake. Subsequently, it was to develop the attack in the direction Mekhovoe and Gorodok as before prior to driving south to seize Vitebsk. 11th Guards Army faced the 129th Infantry and 6th Luftwaffe Field Divisions of German IX Army Corps.

11th Guards Army kicked off after a two-hour artillery preparation but without air support due to poor flying weather. Little progress was made apart from on the sector of the 84th Guards, which penetrated the first German defensive position but was soon halted by a counterattack from reserves of the 129th Infantry. After an overnight regrouping the division, supported by the 1st Tank Corps' 159th Tank Brigade and another artillery preparation, broke through on this same sector and opened the gates to be exploited by the remainder of 1st Tanks along with the 83rd and 16th Guards. This attack completely compromised the German defenses and soon cut the Gorodok–Nevel road in the rear of IX Corps. Early on December 15, despite counterattacks by the 20th Panzer Division, forward elements of the 156th Rifle Division of 4th Shock had linked up near Laptevka with the 83rd Guards and 29th Rifle Divisions, completely encircling the 87th Infantry Division and part of the 129th. A larger encirclement was completed the next day containing the remainder of IX Corps. With this completed the 36th Guards Corps took part in reducing the German pocket in two days of heavy fighting; according to Soviet sources 20,000 German troops became casualties while German sources admit to just over 2,000. For its part in this encirclement operation, on December 21 the 84th Guards would be decorated with the Order of Suvorov, 2nd Degree.

What remained of the German forces fell back to more defensible lines to the south. After a complex regrouping 11th Guards Army resumed its advance on December 23. The difficulties of this advance were later noted by the Army's commander, Lt. Gen. K. N. Galitskiy, in his memoirs:

Unfortunately, 83rd Guards [sic] Rifle Corps... had been weakened during the previous combat, and, as a result, only two of its rifle divisions... were able to attack. The ranks of 36th Guards Rifle Corps, which was ordered to attack the withdrawing enemy with its left wing, were also basically thinned out. Finally, the enemy withdrew rather quickly, while... covering his flanks with groups of tanks and infantry.

Despite these difficulties Gorodok was cleared on December 24. Following this the 11th Guards Army continued to face stubborn resistance and advanced only 4-5km by the end of December 25, being "halted by powerful and carefully organized artillery-mortar and machine-gun fire and also by enemy counterattacks." This was based on a fortified line which was part of the external defense belt around Vitebsk, 25km from the center of the city and Galitskiy's forces spent several days assessing it; it became clear that the goal of liberating the city by December 30-31 in conjunction with 4th Shock was unrealistic. From December 25-31 the Army gradually wedged its way into the German positions, with the 26th, 11th and 31st Guards Divisions making the greatest progress, but even this amounted to just 5-7km of ground gained. The fighting continued into early January, 1944 but was beginning to tail off by January 5 as both sides exhausted themselves.

By January 14 the 1st Baltic Front went over to the defense in front of Vitebsk, but this was temporary as the STAVKA ordered Bagramyan to begin a new attack southeast toward Vitebsk to begin at first light on February 2 on a 12km-wide sector from Mashkina past Lake Zaronovskoe to Gorbachi facing a partly-rebuilt 87th Infantry and battlegroups from 12th Infantry, 20th Panzer and 201st Security Divisions. 36th Guards Corps was in the Army's first echelon along with 8th Guards Corps and they had 1st Tank Corps in support. Altogether Bagramyan was able to concentrate 14 understrength rifle divisions and two tank corps for this effort, a far from overwhelming advantage especially given mid-winter conditions. Following an extensive artillery preparation the assaults quickly overcame the forward defenses of the 87th and 12th Divisions and in two days of heavy fighting advanced up to 3.5km on a 9km-wide front. The 84th and 16th Guards pushed forward 3km, reached the western outskirts of Kisliaki and took the German strongpoint at Gorodishche on the north shore of Lake Zaronovskoe near the boundary of the 87th and 12th Infantry Divisions; the LIII Army Corps was forced to again withdraw the badly shaken 87th from the front and replace it with fresher troops from 20th Panzer. By the end of February 3, the shock group had made enough progress that General Bagramyan released the 26th Guards Rifle Division from 36th Guards Corps' second echelon, while 1st Tank Corps went into action the next morning. The tanks attacked along the Kozly and Mikhali axis at dawn and in two days of heavy fighting with the help of their supporting riflemen managed to advance another 4km, taking Kozly and Novoselki before being halted by 20th Panzer. The attackers were now just 15km northwest of downtown Vitebsk.

By the end of February 5, although LIII Corps had lost considerable territory north of the Vitebsk–Sirotino road its defenses were firming up. To deal with this Bagramyan ordered Galitskiy to redirect 36th and 16th Guards Corps to the south. After a brief regrouping the attack began again on February 7, but 36th Corps made no notable progress before the offensive was halted on February 16. By now 1st Tank Corps had fewer than 10 tanks serviceable, the rifle divisions of 11th Guards Army numbered fewer than 3,000 personnel each due to nearly constant combat since mid-fall, and they had used up most of their ammunition. The next day Bagramyan was ordered to withdraw the Army for rest and refitting with the intention to commit it against Army Group North which was falling back from Leningrad. In the event, after a period in the Reserve of the Supreme High Command it was reassigned to 3rd Belorussian Front in May. The 84th Guards would remain in this Front for the duration.

== Operation Bagration ==
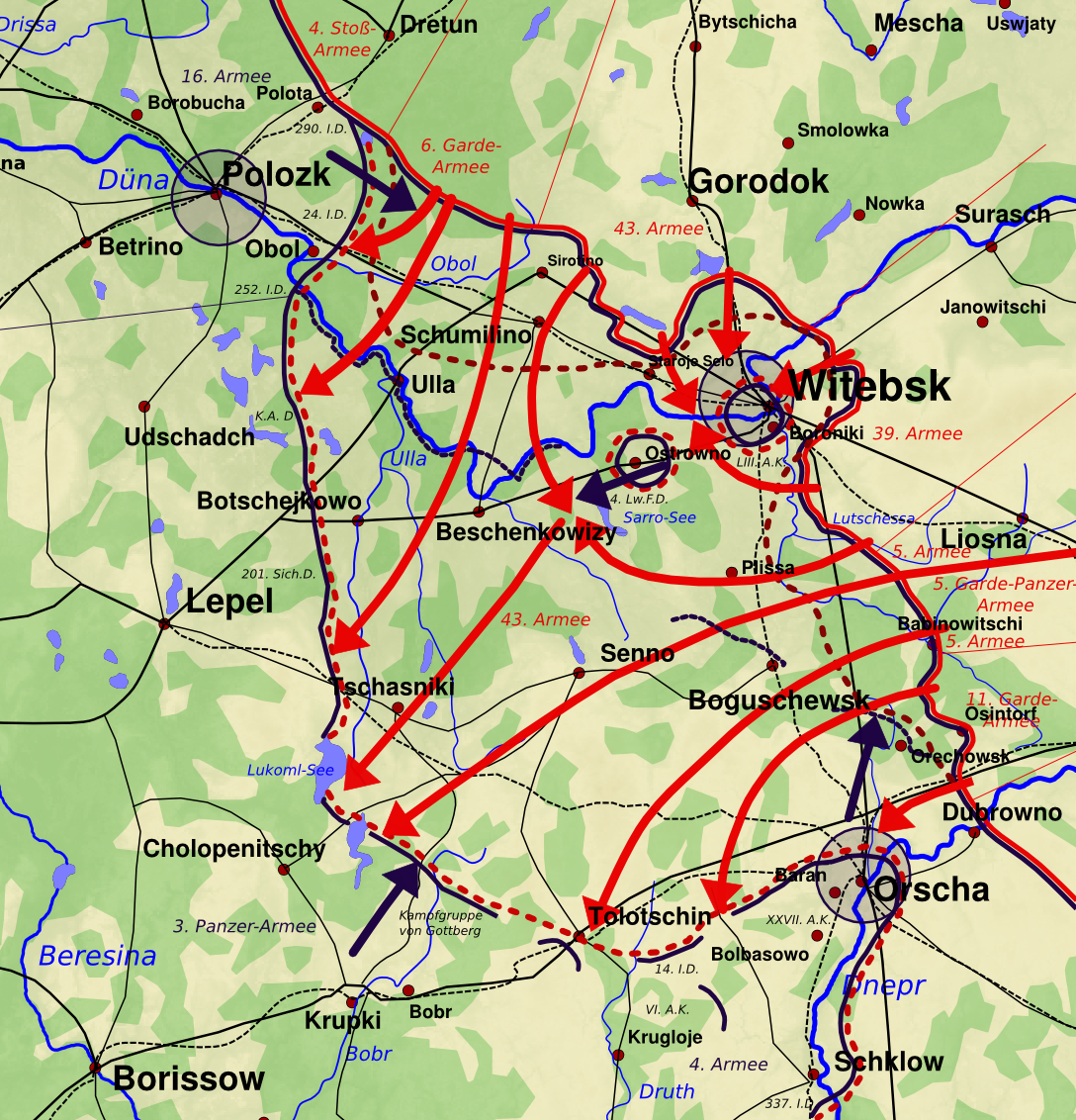
Map of the Vitebsk–Orsha Offensive, June 23-28, 1944. Note position of 11th Guards Army northeast of Orsha.

While in reserve the Army trained intensively in the forests in the Nevel region and received over 20,000 replacements, bringing the 84th Guards and the rest of its rifle divisions to an average of 7,200 personnel each. Beginning on May 25 the Army moved up well behind the front of 3rd Belorussian, followed by a secret move of 300km on June 12-13 to a sector north of the Dniepr River 30km northeast of Orsha, replacing elements of 31st Army. General Galitskiy screened most of his sector with the 16th Guards Corps while the 36th and 8th Guards Corps concentrated on a narrow sector adjacent to 31st Army. On June 22 the 36th Guards Corps was crammed into less than 10km with 8th Guards Corps and had two heavy tank regiments and two assault gun regiments attached. It faced elements of the XXVII Army Corps of German 4th Army, primarily the 78th Assault Division that the division had faced at Karachev.

General Galitskiy decided to launch his main attack along the highway to Minsk on a sector from Ostrov Yurev to Kirieva. The immediate objective was to break through the German defense and pave the way for the 2nd Guards Tank Corps to seize the line of the Orshitsa River by the end of the first day. The 36th Guards Corps, on the Army's left flank, would attack the sector from Slepin to Kirieva towards Shalashino to reach just outside Makarovo. Galitskiy received orders that upon the arrival of the Army's main forces in the area north of Orsha he should attack with a single rifle division from the Moshkovo area toward Baran and Novosele and in this way assist the 31st Army in taking the city. In the event he allotted for this task both the 26th and 84th Guards Divisions.

Along with the other first-echelon divisions of its Front, the 84th Guards prepared a forward battalion to take part in a reconnaissance in force which was conducted through the afternoon and evening of June 22, supported by a 25-minute artillery preparation. While the main purpose of this reconnaissance was to uncover the German fire system, seizing their forward defenses was a secondary goal. While the battalions of 5th Army to the north had considerable success in this regard those of 11th Guards Army generally failed, including that of the division. Following an intensive artillery and airstrike preparation the Front's main offensive began at 0900 hours on June 23. The 36th and 8th Guards Corps encountered fierce resistance from the 78th Assault Division and other German units and through the day only advanced 2km. As a result the 2nd Guards Tanks remained in its jumping-off positions. At 0850 hours on June 24, following a 40-minute artillery preparation the 11th Guards Army resumed its offensive. While 8th and 16th Guards Corps advanced as much as 14km during the day, 36th Corps had still not cleared a path for the commitment of 2nd Guards Tanks and soon became caught up in the fighting for Orsha.

On June 26, as the leading Corps of 11th Guards attacked towards Borisov to prevent 4th Army from withdrawing across the Berezina River, the 36th Guards Corps prepared to capture Orsha in conjunction with 31st Army. The assault was preceded by a 30-minute artillery preparation, supplemented by a series of heavy air attacks lasting for two hours; the Corps began fighting in the northern and western outskirts in the late evening and after stubborn fighting the city was completely cleared by 0700 hours on June 27. The 84th Guards Division was among the units given special recognition for the liberation of Orsha.

=== Minsk Offensive ===
By now the 36th Guards Corps was 35 to 40km in the rear of the rest of 11th Guards Army and it spent the next few days catching up. The STAVKA directed 3rd Belorussian Front to make the main attack in the direction of Minsk with 11th Guards, 31st and 5th Guards Tank Armies. On June 29, the main body of 11th Guards advanced 30km, closing to within 22 to 28km of the Berezina while 36th Corps covered up to 40km pursuing rapidly retreating German forces. The Army advanced decisively across the river on July 1, throwing the defenders 25 to 30km to the west. By the end of the next day the entire 11th Guards had consolidated along a line from Lishitsy to Logoisk to Sarnatsk to Smolevichi as elements of the 36th Guards and 2nd Guards Tank Corps were deployed to cover Minsk from the east. The Belarusian capital was liberated on the morning of July 3, primarily by units of 31st Army. On the same day 11th Guards Army advanced 30 to 35km and took Radashkovichy.

=== Vilnius–Kaunas Offensive ===
On July 5, after liberating Molodechno, the main forces of 11th Guards Army pushed on towards the Neman (Berezina) River which they reached and crossed the next day before running into the German defenses of the "East Wall" and being halted. This line was cracked by a deliberate attack beginning at midday on July 7, despite German tank ambushes and heavy counterattacks. On July 8 the leading units of the Army advanced another 25 to 30km and by now were approaching Vilnius, which held a garrison of about 15,000 men. While the battle for this city went on until the 13th forward detachments of 5th Guards Tanks reached the Neman River, followed by the left flank and center forces of the Front. The 11th Guards faced the relatively fresh 131st Infantry Division in the Rudiskes area. By the end of July 15, the Army, in cooperation with 5th Army, had seized a bridgehead 28km long and 2 to 6km deep, while it also was maintaining a second bridgehead up to 6km deep.

Overnight on July 17/18 another bridgehead was created near the city of Alytus, largely under the leadership of Sen. Lt. Nikolai Fedorovich Semyonov, a company commander of the 93rd Guards Sapper Battalion. His company had been included in the division's forward detachment and upon reaching the Neman he skilfully chose a crossing place and organized the building of rafts and other improvised means for crossing the infantry and artillery. His company's fighters reached the west bank silently, neutralized German sentries and secured the bridgehead without a shot being fired. After dawn he continued to lead the successful crossing of the artillery under enemy fire. For his courage and leadership Semyonov would be made a Hero of the Soviet Union on March 24, 1945. After the war he was moved to the reserve and returned to his hometown near Solnechnogorsk where he got an education in forestry and worked in that profession until his retirement. He died in Moscow in 1980 at the age of 76.

The bridgeheads continued to expand in fighting through to the 20th as German counterattacks were repelled, at which point the Front went over to a temporary defense. A further advance began on July 29, which gained 10–15km. Kaunas was taken by 5th Army on August 1, and German forces continued falling back to the west. By now the 84th Guards had only a single company in each rifle battalion, and each company averaged 25–30 men. On August 12 the division was awarded the Order of the Red Banner for its part in the forcing of the Neman.

== Into Germany ==
On October 16 the division, along with the rest of 11th Guards, began attacking into East Prussia as part of the Front's abortive Goldap-Gumbinnen Operation, which ended in early November. At about this time the 89th Guards Antitank Battalion had its towed guns replaced with 12 SU-76 self-propelled guns. General Peters had suffered a head wound during the Neman crossing on July 24 but remained with the division. On October 27 he was more severely wounded and evacuated to hospital. After his recovery he was given command of the 5th Guards Rifle Division which by then had returned to 36th Guards Corps. In recognition of his successful leadership in the battles for East Prussia he would be made a Hero of the Soviet Union on May 5, 1945. Maj. Gen. Ivan Kuzmich Shcherbina took command of the division on October 28 and held this post for the duration of the war.

In the planning for the Vistula-Oder Offensive the 11th Guards Army began in the second echelon of 3rd Belorussian Front, on a sector from Kybartai to Kaukern on the right and Millunen to Georgenburg on the left. The intermediate objective was to capture Insterburg by the end of the fifth day in cooperation with 28th Army. The offensive against East Prussia began on January 13, 1945 and on January 21 the Front commander, Army Gen. I. D. Chernyakhovsky, decided to use his 11th Guards, 5th and 28th Armies to encircle and eliminate the German Insterburg–Gumbinnen group of forces, with the objective of pursuing and advancing directly on Königsberg. Chernyakhovsky assigned 11th Guards and 5th Armies to encircle Insterburg and capture it on January 22.

=== Battle for Insterburg ===
In order to block the Soviet advance on Insterburg the German command organized a defense along a line from Lindenburg to Zaken to Insterburg, using remnants of three infantry divisions and other assorted troops. This was soon broken through by 16th Guards Rifle Corps supported by 2nd Guards Tank Corps. Meanwhile, to the right, the 8th Guards Corps attacked along the paved road from Gross Skeisgirren to Welau with the 26th Guards Division and 1st Tank Corps leading the pursuit towards the Pregel River; 36th Guards Corps remained in second echelon. Altogether the 11th Guards Army advanced 45km in two days, reaching the approaches to Insterburg while the 26th Guards and 1st Tanks deeply outflanked the German Insterburg–Gumbinnen grouping from the west. Chernyakhovsky now ordered the 11th Guards and 5th Armies to break through the German defensive line with a concentric attack from north, east and south.

General Galitskiy chose to attack the town at night with the 36th Guards Corps, to break into the town from the north and destroy the German garrison (remnants of the 1st, 56th and 349th Infantry Divisions with tanks from the 5th Panzer Division) in cooperation with 5th Army's 72nd Rifle Corps from the northeast and east. The 36th Guards Corps carried out a regrouping and attacked at 2300 hours on January 21, following a 20-minute artillery preparation; it was met by powerful machine gun and mortar fire and frenzied counterattacks. German units covering the road intersections north of the town held on with particular stubbornness. Units of the 16th Guards Division were counterattacked six times and forced to slow the pace of their advance. In response the Corps commander, Lt. Gen. P. K. Koshevoy, committed the 84th Guards from second echelon and at 0100 hours on January 22 its regiments broke through the defense. By 0600 hours Insterburg was completely cleared. 8th Guards Corps outflanked and secured Wehlau the following day and the Army was now ordered to attack from the line of the Alle River along the south bank of the Pregel and reach a line from Steinbeck to Grunbaum by the end of January 24. In recognition of its part in the capture of Insterburg, on February 19 the 186th Guards Artillery Regiment would be awarded the Order of Suvorov, 3rd Degree.

=== Battle of Königsberg ===
On the morning of January 30 forward detachments of the 16th Guards Corps broke through the German defenses and reached the shore of the Frisches Haff, isolating Königsberg from the rest of Germany while units of the 36th and 8th Guards Corps turned their fronts to face north and took several concrete fortifications in the city's outer defensive zone. On February 9 the 11th Guards along with the 43rd and 39th Armies, all operating close to Königsberg, were transferred to 1st Baltic Front while 3rd Belorussian focused on eliminating the large group of German forces in the western regions of East Prussia. As of February 24 the 1st Baltic was redesignated as the Zemland Group of Forces with the three armies and 3rd Air Army under command, now back as part of 3rd Belorussian Front. Before Königsberg could be reduced it was necessary to isolate it again. For this offensive the 11th Guards Army was detached from the Zemland Group. On March 13 the attack to the southwest began, following a 40-minute artillery preparation. The German forces put up particularly fierce resistance against the Army, which was attacking in the direction of Brandenburg. Its left flank was able to advance 2-3km and the attack continued into the night and the following day through dense fog. On March 15 the 36th Guards Corps captured Wangitt on the Frisches Haff, again cutting communications with the city. By March 26 the 11th Guards was mopping up German remnants and preparing to return to the Zemland Group.

When the assault on Königsberg began on April 6 the 11th Guards was responsible for the attack from the south. The German garrison numbered more than 100,000 men, with 850 guns and up to 60 tanks and assault guns. For the attack the Army was reinforced with the 23rd Tank Brigade, three self-propelled artillery regiments, a Guards heavy tank regiment, the 10th Artillery Division and many other artillery units. It faced the German 69th Infantry Division. On the first day, after a 90-minute artillery bombardment, the attack went in at noon. 36th and 16th Guards Corps on the left and center made the most progress, penetrating 4km into the German defenses, blockading two forts, clearing 43 city blocks and beginning fighting for the railway station. On April 7 the Army continued fighting for the city's railroad junction, now assisted by heavy airstrikes. By the end of the day it had captured two forts and the suburbs of Zeligenfeld, Speihersdorf and Ponart. On the afternoon of April 8 it forced the Pregel to the northwest of Ponart and linked up with 43rd Army, cutting off the fortress from the forces of the German Samland Group and also capturing the port area. Over the following day German resistance slackened and by its end Königsberg had officially capitulated.

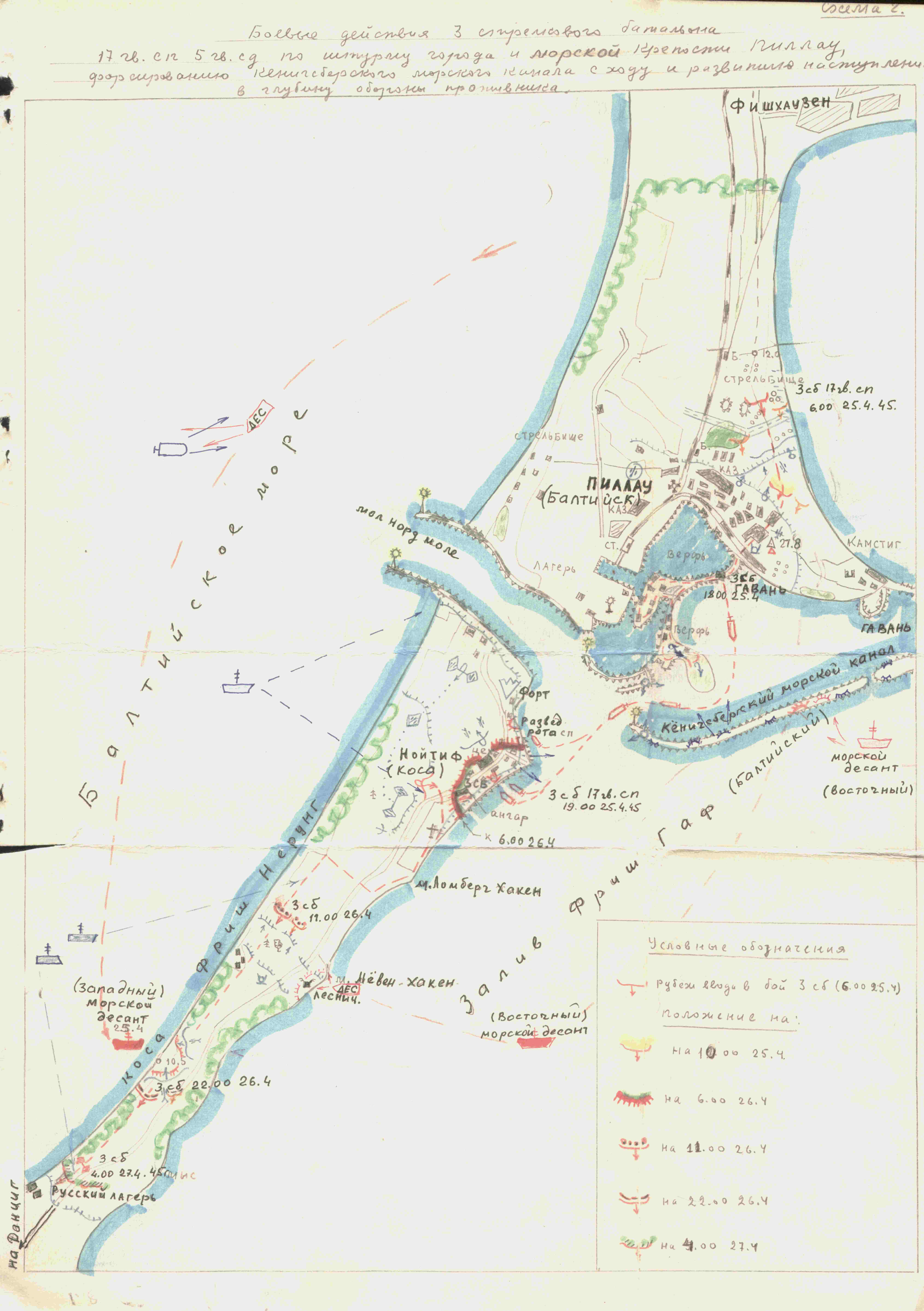
Battle for Pillau

In the Samland offensive that followed beginning on April 13 the 11th Guards Army was initially in the Zemland Group's second echelon. It was committed into the first line overnight on April 17/18, relieving 2nd Guards Army on the Vistula Spit, facing the heavily fortified town of Pillau. After reconnaissance over the next two days the 16th and 36th Guards Corps attacked at 1100 hours on April 20 but made little progress, which did not change the following day. On April 22, after 8th Guards Corps was brought in as reinforcements, the German defense began to crack. Pillau finally fell on April 25.

== Postwar ==
When the fighting ended the men and women of the division shared the full title of 84th Guards Rifle, Karachev, Order of the Red Banner, Order of Suvorov Division. (Russian: 84-я гвардейская Карачевская Краснознамённая ордена Суворова дивизия.) On May 28 the 186th Guards Artillery would be further decorated with the Order of Kutuzov, 3rd Degree. The division was gradually disbanded from late 1945 into 1946.
