= 26th Guards Rifle Division =

26th Guards Rifle Division (April 20, 1942 – May 10, 1957)
- Active: 1942–1957
- Country: Soviet Union
- Branch: Red Army (1942–1946); Soviet Army (1946–1957)
- Type: Division
- Role: Infantry
- Engagements: World War II; Eastern Front; Battles of Rzhev; First Rzhev–Sychyovka Offensive Operation; Operation Mars; Rzhev-Vyazma Offensive; Operation Kutuzov; Battle of Smolensk; Battle of Nevel; Vitebsk-Bogushevsk Offensive; Operation Bagration; Vitebsk-Orsha Offensive; Minsk Offensive; Vilnius-Kaunas Offensive; Goldap-Gumbinnen Operation; Vistula-Oder Offensive; East Prussian Offensive; Battle of Königsberg; Samland Offensive
- Decorations: Order of the Red Banner; Order of Suvorov
- Battle honours: East Siberian; Gorodok

Commanders
- Notable commanders: Maj. Gen. Nikolai Nikolaevich Korzhenevskii; Maj. Gen. Grigorii Ivanovich Chernov; Maj. Gen. Ivan Moiseevich Tretyak

The 26th Guards Rifle Division was reformed as an elite infantry division of the Red Army in April, 1942, based on the 1st formation of the 93rd Rifle Division, and served in that role until after the end of the Great Patriotic War. It would soon after provide the headquarters cadre for the 8th Guards Rifle Corps. It was soon assigned, with its Corps, to 20th Army of Western Front and saw extensive fighting, while also suffering extensive casualties, in two campaigns against the German 9th Army in the Rzhev salient through the rest of 1942. The division, again with 8th Guards Corps, joined the 11th Guards Army when it was formed in April, 1943 and, apart from a brief reassignment in early 1944, remained under those commands for the duration of the war. During that summer the division took part in the liberation of Bryansk. By December, after fighting through western Russia north of Smolensk it was in 1st Baltic Front, attacking south towards Gorodok and won the name of that city as a battle honor. By the start of the offensive against Army Group Center in the summer of 1944 the 26th Guards had been redeployed with its Army to the south of Vitebsk as part of 3rd Belorussian Front, where it would remain for the duration. Driving westward during Operation Bagration the division advanced north of Orsha and then helped to seize a crossing over the Berezina River for which it was awarded the Order of the Red Banner. It continued to advance through Lithuania to the border with East Prussia later that year. As part of the East Prussian Offensive the 26th Guards entered that heavily fortified region in the winter of 1945 and helped gradually break the German resistance there, particularly at Insterburg and Königsberg, winning the Order of Suvorov for its part in the battle for the former place. The division ended the war at Pillau. The 26th Guards remained in the Kaliningrad Oblast well after the war, becoming the 26th Guards Motorized Rifle Division in 1957 and not finally disbanded until 1989.

== Formation ==
As the 93rd the division had been originally formed on August 14, 1936, at Chita in the Siberian Military District, based on the 106th Siberian Rifle Regiment, in October of that year it was named the "East Siberian" division, a name that it continued to carry throughout the war. The division was officially raised to Guards status on April 20, 1942, in recognition of its leading role in driving in the south flank of German 4th Army during the counteroffensive in front of Moscow and the liberation of Maloyaroslavets and Yukhnov. As the 93rd the division had the standard prewar howitzer regiment (the 128th) in addition to the light artillery regiment, but this had been removed earlier in the month to become a separate army-level support unit. After the subunits received their redesignations on May 19 the division's order of battle was as follows:

- 75th Guards Rifle Regiment (from 51st Rifle Regiment)
- 77th Guards Rifle Regiment (from 129th Rifle Regiment)
- 79th Guards Rifle Regiment (from 266th Rifle Regiment)
- 57th Guards Artillery Regiment (from 100th Light Artillery Regiment)
- 25th Guards Antitank Battalion (from 144th Antitank Battalion)
- 24th Guards Antiaircraft Battery (until February 7, 1943)
- 9th Guards Mortar Battalion (until October 20, 1942)
- 19th Guards Reconnaissance Company
- 30th Guards Sapper Battalion
- 38th Guards Signal Battalion
- 21st Guards Medical/Sanitation Battalion (from 394th Medical/Sanitation Battalion)
- 27th Guards Chemical Defense (Anti-gas) Company
- 22nd Guards Motor Transport Company (from 575th Motor Transport Company)
- 30th Guards Field Bakery (from 550th Field Bakery)
- 20th Guards Divisional Veterinary Hospital (from 525th Divisional Veterinary Hospital)
- 250th Field Postal Station
- 824th Field Office of the State Bank

Col. Nikolai Nikolaevich Korzhenevskii remained in command of the division after redesignation; he would be promoted to the rank of major general on November 27. At this time the division was under command of the 43rd Army. In May it was withdrawn to the reserves of Western Front, providing the command cadre for the new 8th Guards Rifle Corps; as with all Guards rifle corps in this period it consisted of one Guards division with a number of rifle brigades, in this case the 129th, 140th, 150th and the 153rd. In June the Corps was assigned to the 20th Army, still in Western Front.

== Battles of Rzhev ==
At the beginning of July, following a discussion with Stalin, Army Gen. G. K. Zhukov initiated planning for an offensive by 20th Army against the Rzhev salient to be called Operation "Sverdlovsk". This was intended primarily as a means to draw German reserves from their developing offensive in the south, but as it developed Zhukov's plan anticipated advances towards Rzhev, Sychyovka and Gzhatsk. In its final form the operation was to include the 29th and 30th Armies of Kalinin Front to the north and the 31st and 20th Armies of Western Front to the south. Kalinin Front began its offensive on July 30, but on the same day heavy rains began which flooded the countryside and turned the roads into quagmires which bogged down the 30th Army's advance while the 29th failed to penetrate the German front at all. After waiting for the weather to abate Western Front attacked on August 4 following a powerful artillery preparation which destroyed or suppressed roughly 80 percent of the German forces' weapons. 8th Guards Corps, in the first echelon of 20th Army, breached the defenses south of Pogoreloe Gorodishche allowing the Army's mobile group, the 2nd Guards Cavalry Corps, to begin to exploit in the direction of Sychyovka. 31st Army was similarly successful to the north and by the end of August 6 the gap in the German front was up to 30 km wide and Soviet troops had penetrated to a depth of 25 km, closing on the Gzhat and Vazuza rivers.

20th Army intended to liberate Sychyovka on August 7 but by now the German High Command was reacting with alarm and the offensive began drawing German reserves. 8th Guards Corps ran into elements of the 1st Panzer Division as it continued to advance and on August 9 and 10 the roughly 800 tanks under Western Front met counterattacks by about 700 panzers; the Soviet armor lacked adequate signals equipment and command facilities which limited its effectiveness. As an example the 11th Tank Brigade lost contact with its headquarters and wandered into the sector of 8th Guards Corps against orders. The counterattack was eventually repulsed but the Soviet forces in turn were unable to make much headway. On August 23 the Corps, in cooperation with elements of 5th Army, broke through the German grouping at Karmanovo and liberated that town. Although this date is given as the official end of the offensive in Soviet histories, in fact 20th Army persisted in efforts to penetrate the German front and attack Gzhatsk from the west before going over to the defense on September 8. In total during the period from August 4 to September 10 the 20th Army suffered a total of 60,453 personnel killed, wounded and missing-in-action.

=== Operation Mars ===
In the buildup to the new Soviet offensive around the Rzhev salient in the autumn the 26th Guards, with its Corps, was alerted by Western Front Directive No. 0289/OP on October 1 as follows:

"The commander of the 20th [Army] Grouping, consisting of the... 26th Guards... Rifle Division[s]... will attack towards Sychyovka, in the front's sector from Vasilki to Pechora. The immediate mission is to penetrate the enemy's front and secure Sychyovka and the railroad line in the Osuga River and Sychyovka sector..."

In the event, due largely to weather, the offensive did not begin until November 25. At this time the 8th Guards Corps consisted of the 26th Guards plus the 148th and 150th Rifle Brigades, and was in the Army's second echelon along with a cavalry/mechanized group consisting of the 6th Tank Corps and the 2nd Guards Cavalry Corps. 8th Guards Corps was supported by the 11th and 18th Tank Brigades. In the first echelon the Army had five divisions, including the 247th and 331st on the front line along the Vazuza about 20 km northeast of Sychyovka. The German XXXIX Panzer Corps was holding the sector with the 14th Infantry Regiment of the 78th Infantry Division backed by the two panzergrenadier regiments of 5th Panzer Division. In the operational plan the two rifle divisions were to make a headlong advance over the mostly-frozen river following a massive artillery preparation and punch through the forward German defenses. 8th Guards Corps was to follow the advancing first echelon by the end of the first day, mop up bypassed German resistance, expand the south flank of the penetration towards Sychyovka and follow and support the exploiting mobile group.

The offensive began with the artillery at 0750 hours which continued for more than 90 minutes. However, fog and blowing snow hindered observation and the bombardment was not as effective as planned. Despite failures along the rest of 20th Army's front, the 247th Division, supported by 80th Tank Brigade, reached the far side of the Vazuza early in the assault and by noon had seized two fortified villages. At the same time the 331st also forced the river and captured the village of Prudy but was abruptly halted by heavy German fire from the town of Khlepen to the south. Although the 247th continued to advance in the afternoon to a depth of nearly 2 km, and the 331st also expanded the bridgehead, there wasn't enough space to deploy the 8th Guards Corps effectively. Instead, Col. Gen. I. S. Konev, the Western Front commander, chose to commit the 6th Tank Corps early the next day, assuming an additional armored blow would complete the breakthrough of the German front. Anticipating this breakthrough and realizing the need for infantry to consolidate the tanks' gains the 8th Guards Corps was ordered to advance over the river in tandem with and just to the south of the tank corps. The problem with this revised plan was that there were just two fragile roads running from the rear to the Vazuza which were not adequate to move such a mass of men and vehicles.

The night of November 25/26 proved to be "a staff officer's nightmare." Despite their best efforts the marching troops and equipment became entangled and delayed. In the end neither the 8th Guards or 6th Tanks Corps completed their concentrations forward before mid-morning. Meanwhile, German counterattacks were regaining some ground in the bridgehead lost the previous day. By mid-afternoon the 148th and 150th Rifle Brigades were in action against hard-pressed elements of the 78th Infantry and 5th Panzer Divisions between Zherebtsovo and Khlepen while the XXXIX Corps anxiously awaited the arrival of the 9th Panzer Division. However, due to congestion at the crossings the 26th Guards remained on the east bank until just after midnight. A Soviet after action report noted:

"The responsible 20th Army staff officers, who were in charge of the crossing sites, had such a poor understanding of the situation that they continued to permit transport and rear service units to cross to the western bank at the same time that combat elements of the exploitation echelon remained on the river's eastern bank."

By now the entire offensive timetable was in a shambles. On November 27 the two rifle brigades reinforced their positions but their repeated attacks on the two strongpoints they faced made little headway. Late in the evening the division moved up and relieved the 3rd Guards and 20th Cavalry Divisions which had become exhausted in their struggle for the villages of Arestovo and Podosinovka.

By this point in the battle the 6th Tank Corps had broken through the German front and cut the road from Sychyovka to Rzhev, but was nearly isolated and in need of support, which would come from the 2nd Guards Cavalry. Overnight the 26th Guards struck the position at Podosinovka with the goal of both providing passage for the cavalry and to carry on its own advance. While this attack diverted enough German firepower to allow the cavalry to break through with some losses, the village remained in German hands and the division suffered heavy casualties. By dawn on the 28th tanks of the 9th Panzer began to arrive but were forced over to the defense as the division renewed its attacks on Podosinovka backed by armor and cavalry. During fierce and confused fighting XXXIX Corps reported at 1000 hours that the village had fallen, but this turned out to be false. Throughout the day the efforts of 20th Army to expand the bridgehead proved futile.

By the morning of November 29 the 8th Guards Corps had been reinforced with the 354th Rifle Division, which took up positions between the 148th and 150th Brigades. The Corps, which now manned the entire south flank of the bridgehead, was ordered to attack from Zherebtsovo to Khlepen in another attempt to get the offensive moving, but lost many men in futile attacks. At the end of the day 20th Army received orders to intensify its attacks against the same objectives the next day. From December 1–5 the 354th maintained its attempts against Khlepen, without success but at the cost of many casualties. By this time the 8th Guards Corps was no longer combat effective; it had lost 6,068 men in just five days of fighting, most from the 26th Guards. General Zhukov was still desperate to renew the offensive and on December 4 he sacked Maj. Gen. Nikolay Kiryukhin, commander of 20th Army, replacing him with Lt. Gen. M. S. Khozin. At about this time the 148th and 150th Brigades were pulled from the bridgehead for replenishment and the 415th Rifle Division took up positions near Podosinovka and the 26th Guards shifted to the Zherebtsovo sector. By December 11 the two brigades returned while the division had been removed from the front lines, thus avoiding the last spasm of fighting before Zhukov finally acknowledged his forces were spent on December 15. Altogether from November 25 until December 18 the 8th Guards Corps, not including the 354th Division, lost 2,311 men killed, 7,434 wounded and 360 missing-in-action, for a total of 10,105 casualties. On December 7 the division had reported that it had just over 400 "bayonets" (infantry and sappers) remaining on strength.

== Into Western Russia ==
The 26th Guards remained in 8th Guards Corps and in 20th Army into February, 1943 when it was moved to the reserves of Western Front for much-needed rest and rebuilding. In March it was assigned to the 49th Army and saw some service in the Rzhev-Vyazma Offensive as the German 9th Army was withdrawing from the Rzhev salient. In April it rejoined 8th Guards Rifle Corps, which was now in 16th Army. Prior to the Soviet summer offensive the 16th Army was re-designated as the 11th Guards Army and the division would serve under that command for the duration. Before the German offensive at Kursk had ended the Bryansk and Western Fronts began an offensive against the northeastern flank of the German-held salient around Oryol on July 12. 11th Guards Army achieved a deep penetration at the boundary between the German 211th and 293rd Infantry Divisions. The Army commander, Lt. Gen. I. K. Bagramyan, committed his mobile forces in the afternoon and advanced about 10–12 km. Army Group Center hurriedly brought up the 5th Panzer Division to mount a counterattack in the evening, which was unsuccessful. By mid-July the main forces of Western Front were preparing for its summer offensive, Operation Suvorov, the timing of which depended in part on the progress of 11th Guards Army in Kutuzov. Ideally the right flank of Army Group Center would be destabilized and in retreat after evacuating the Oryol salient, but in the event it consolidated along the Hagen line at its base.

On July 30 the 11th Guards Army was transferred to Bryansk Front and advanced towards the Front's namesake city through August and September. When the Front was disbanded on October 10 the Army accompanied its headquarters northwest to the area east of Velikiye Luki. The headquarters was used to establish Baltic Front (2nd Baltic Front as of October 20) and the Army remained under its command. At noon on November 18 the Army was reassigned to 1st Baltic Front. Given the complex situation in the Nevel region, where the 3rd and 4th Shock Armies had carved out a large salient behind the lines of German 16th Army (Army Group North) and 3rd Panzer Army (Army Group Center), Col. Gen. Bagramyan, who now commanded the Front, planned an attack along the Gorodok - Vitebsk axis with 11th Guards Army. Five divisions were concentrated on an 8 km-wide sector with 8th Guards Corps (5th, 26th, 83rd Guards and 29th Rifle Divisions) in second echelon. In the event the STAVKA delayed the start of the offensive until November 26, but an unseasonal thaw forced a further delay into early December.

=== Battle for Gorodok ===
The offensive was finally able to proceed on December 13. 8th Guards Corps attacked the northern tip of the German-held Ezerishche salient north of Vitebsk, on both sides of Lake Ezerishche, with the 26th Guards in second echelon. The initial objective was to cut off the northwestern portion of the salient in cooperation with 4th Shock Army and destroy the German grouping southwest of the lake. Subsequently, it was to develop the attack in the direction Mekhovoe and Gorodok before driving south to seize Vitebsk. 11th Guards Army faced the 129th Infantry and 6th Luftwaffe Field Divisions of German IX Army Corps.

11th Guards Army kicked off after a two-hour artillery preparation but without air support due to poor flying weather. Little progress was made apart from on one sector, but even this was soon halted by German reserves. After an overnight regrouping the 83rd Guards Division broke through on this sector on the following morning with the help of the 159th Tank Brigade and another artillery preparation. This attack completely compromised the German defenses and soon cut the Gorodok-Nevel road in the rear of IX Corps. Early on December 15, despite counterattacks by the 20th Panzer Division, forward elements of the two Soviet armies had linked up, completely encircling the 87th Infantry Division and part of the 129th. A larger encirclement was completed the next day containing the remainder of IX Corps. With this completed the 8th Guards Corps took part in reducing the German pocket in two days of heavy fighting; according to Soviet sources 20,000 German troops became casualties while German sources admit to just over 2,000. What remained of the German forces fell back to more defensible lines to the south. After a complex regrouping 11th Guards Army resumed its advance on December 23. General Bagramyan stated in his memoirs:

"The 11th Guards Army's commander was inclined to give his forces the opportunity to rest on the night of 24 December and continue the operation at first light. However after a comprehensive discussion of that question... we decided to carry out a night assault... The attack signal was given to the 83rd and 26th Guards Rifle Divisions, which were operating from the west, and the 11th Guards, which was attacking from the east, at 0200 hours. As we expected, after the initial shock generated by a surprise night attack by infantry and tanks, the enemy resisted fiercely along both axes... Having waited for the moment when combat in both attack sectors reached a fever pitch, I ordered General K. N. Galitskiy to throw Major General N. L. Soldatov's 5th Guards Division into the storm of the city..."

Gorodok was cleared later that day, and the division was one of the four noted above that were awarded its name as an honorific:

GORODOK (Vitebsk Oblast)... 26th Guards Rifle Division (Major General Korzhenevskii, Nikolai Nikolaevich)... The troops who participated in the liberation of Gorodok, by the order of the Supreme High Command of 24 December 1943, and a commendation in Moscow, are given a salute of 12 artillery salvoes from 124 guns.

In his memoirs Galitskiy states that the slowness of the offensive was largely due to deteriorating strength of his forces. Following the battle for Gorodok his Army continued to face stubborn resistance and advanced only 4–5 km by the end of December 25, being "halted by powerful and carefully organized artillery-mortar and machine-gun fire and also by enemy counterattacks." This was based on a fortified line which was part of the external defense belt around Vitebsk, 25 km from the center of the city and Galitskiy's forces spent several days assessing it; it became clear that the goal of liberating the city by December 30–31 in conjunction with 4th Shock was unrealistic. From December 25–31 the Army gradually wedged its way into the German positions, with the 26th, 11th and 31st Guards Divisions making the greatest progress, but even this amounted to just 5–7 km of ground gained. The fighting continued into early January, 1944 but was beginning to tail off by January 5 as both sides exhausted themselves. A last gasp effort began the next day when the 26th and 83rd Guards made a supporting attack in the sector north of Mashkina. On January 9, while this fighting was continuing, General Korzhenevskii was killed when a German shell scored a direct hit on his divisional command post. He was replaced the next day by Col. Grigorii Ivanovich Chernov, who was promoted to the rank of major general a week later. Chernov would lead the division for the duration of the war. By January 14 the 1st Baltic Front went over to the defense in front of Vitebsk.

=== Vitebsk Offensive ===
Later that month the division was transferred to the 36th Guards Rifle Corps, still in 11th Guards Army. The offensive om Vitebsk was resumed on February 2. General Galitskiy formed his shock group from the 8th and 36th Guards Corps backed by the 1st Tank Corps and facing the 87th Infantry Division plus battlegroups from 20th Panzer and the 201st Security Divisions from Mashkina southward past Lake Zaronovskoe to Gorbachi. After an extensive artillery preparation the shock group quickly overcame the forward defenses of the 87th Infantry and in two days of fighting advanced up to 3.5 km. The 16th and 84th Guards Divisions reached the western outskirts of Kisliaki and captured the German strongpoint at Gorodishche on the north shore of Lake Zaronovskoe. The German LIII Army Corps withdrew the battered 87th Infantry and replaced it with the far stronger Group Breidenbach from 20th Panzer. By the end of February 3 the shock group had made enough progress that General Bagramyan released the 26th Guards from the Corps' second echelon, while 1st Tank Corps went into action the next morning. The tanks attacked along the Kozly and Mikhali axis at dawn and in two days of heavy fighting with the help of their supporting riflemen managed to advance another 4 km, taking Kozly and Novoselki before being halted by 20th Panzer. The attackers were now just 15 km northwest of downtown Vitebsk.

By the end of February 5, although LIII Corps had lost considerable territory north of the Vitebsk-Sirotino road its defenses were firming up. To deal with this Bagramyan ordered Galitskiy to redirect 16th and 36th Guards Corps to the south. After a brief regrouping the attack began again on February 7 but 36th Corps made no notable progress before the offensive was halted on February 16. By now 1st Tank Corps had fewer than 10 tanks serviceable, the rifle divisions of 11th Guards Army numbered fewer than 3,000 personnel each due to nearly constant combat since mid-fall, and they had used up most of their ammunition. The next day Bagramyan was ordered to withdraw the Army for rest and refitting with the intention to commit it against Army Group North which was falling back from Leningrad. In the event, after a period in the Reserve of the Supreme High Command it was reassigned to 3rd Belorussian Front in May, and the division returned to 8th Guards Corps in the same period, where it would remain for the duration.

== Operation Bagration ==
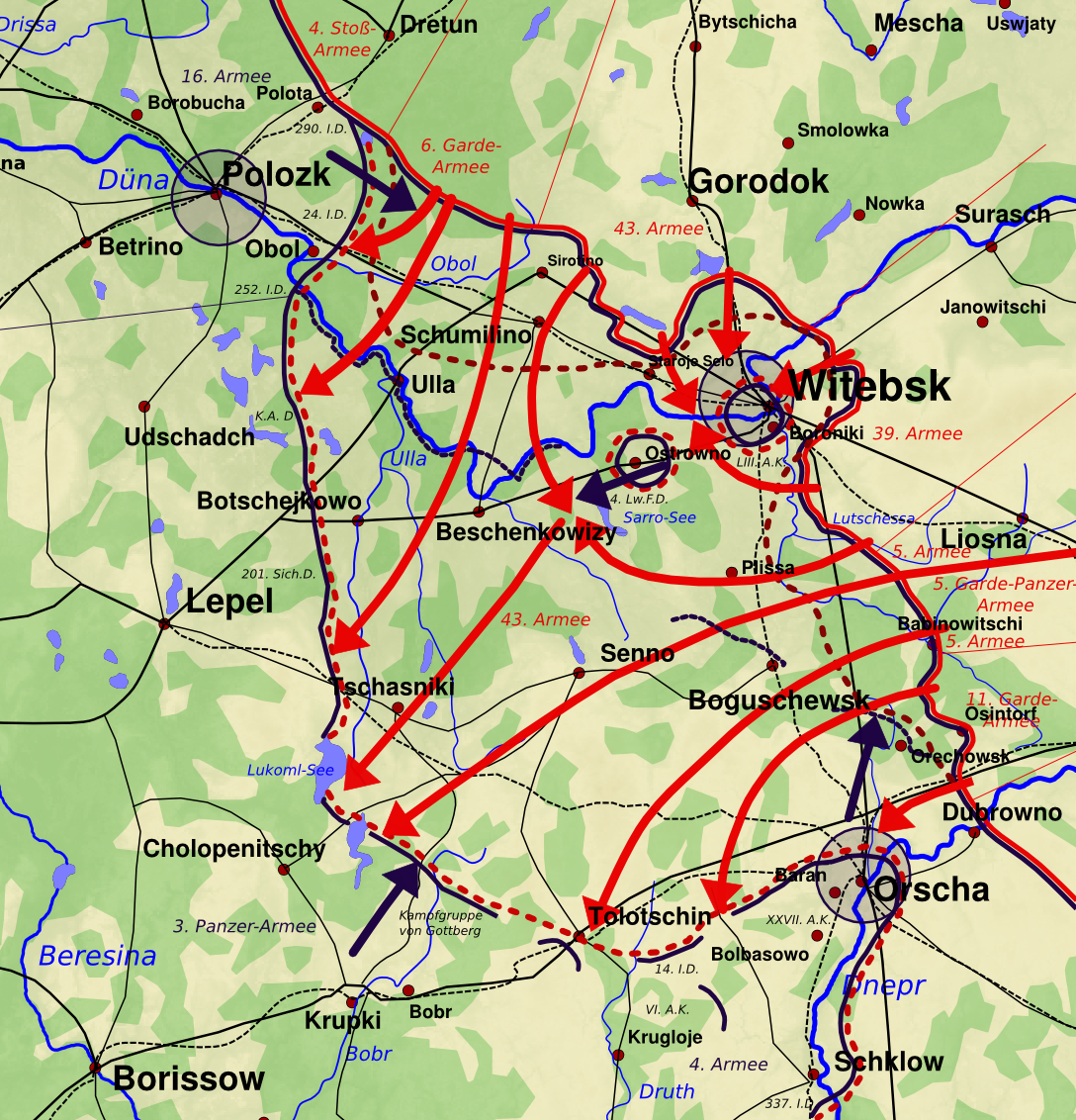
Map of the Vitebsk–Orsha Offensive, June 23–28, 1944. Note position of 11th Guards Army northeast of Orsha.

In the buildup to the summer offensive against Army Group Center the 11th Guards Army trained intensively in the forests in the Nevel region and received over 20,000 replacements, bringing the 26th Guards and the rest of its rifle divisions to an average of 7,200 personnel each. Beginning on May 25 the Army moved up well behind the front of 3rd Belorussian, followed by a secret move of 300 km on June 12–13 to a sector north of the Dniepr River 30 km northeast of Orsha, replacing elements of 31st Army. General Galitskiy screened most of his sector with the 16th Guards Corps while the 8th and 36th Corps concentrated on a narrow sector adjacent to 31st Army. On June 22 the 8th Corps was crammed into less than 10 km with 36th Corps and had two heavy tank regiments and two assault gun regiments attached. It faced elements of the XXVII Army Corps of German 4th Army, primarily the 78th Assault Division (previously the 78th Infantry that the division had faced in Operation Mars).

=== Vitebsk-Orsha Offensive ===
General Galitskiy decided to launch his main attack along the highway to Minsk on a sector from Ostrov Yurev to Kirieva. The immediate objective was to break through the German defense and pave the way for the 2nd Guards Tank Corps to seize the line of the Orshitsa River by the end of the first day. 8th Guards Corps, in the Army's center, would attack the sector from Osintroi to Slepin towards Zabezhnitsa, seize a line from outside Brokhovskie to Height 172.3 (2 km west of Zabezhnitsa), and then develop its offensive towards Selekta.

Along with the other first-echelon divisions of its Front, the 26th Guards prepared a forward battalion to take part in a reconnaissance in force which was conducted through the afternoon and evening of June 22, supported by a 25-minute artillery preparation. While the main purpose of this reconnaissance was to uncover the German fire system, seizing their forward defenses was a secondary goal. While the battalions of 5th Army to the north had considerable success in this regard those of 11th Guards Army generally failed, including that of the division. Following an intensive artillery and airstrike preparation the Front's main offensive began at 0900 hours on June 23. The 8th and 36th Guards Corps encountered fierce resistance from the 78th Assault Division and other German units and through the day only advanced 2 km. As a result, the 2nd Guards Tanks remained in its jumping-off positions. At 0850 hours on June 24, following a 40-minute artillery preparation the 11th Guards Army resumed its offensive. While 8th and 16th Guards Corps advanced as much as 14 km during the day, 36th Corps had still not cleared a path for the commitment of 2nd Guards Tanks and soon became caught up in the fighting for Orsha.

On the night of June 24/25, Jr. Sgt. Yuri Vasilevich Smirnov, a squad leader of the 1st Company of the 77th Guards Rifle Regiment, was severely wounded while riding a tank that was breaking through the German front north of Orsha and was taken prisoner. Over the following hours he was tortured for information in the presence of Lt. Gen. Hans Traut, commander of 78th Assault Division, as Traut testified in his 1947 trial for war crimes. Traut also testified that Smirnov had not given up any information and died while under interrogation. The evidence of the crime was soon uncovered when Orsha was liberated and Smirnov's body was found crucified by German bayonets in a dugout. On October 6 Smirnov was posthumously made a Hero of the Soviet Union.

On June 25 the Army focused its efforts on the sector of 16th Corps which threw the German forces back another 7–12 km and was by now deeply outflanking Orsha from the north. On June 26 the two leading Corps of 11th Guards attacked towards Borisov to prevent 4th Army from withdrawing across the Berezina River. In the course of the day they advanced 20–25 km to the west, supported by 2nd Guards Tanks, while destroying retiring German rearguards. Over the next two days the pursuit unfolded at high speed. The Army's forward detachments covered another 50–65 km and in conjunction with the 5th Guards Tank Army was deeply enveloping the left flank of German 4th Army, which was withdrawing to the west south of the Orsha-Borisov railroad. The STAVKA now issued Directive No. 220124, ordering 3rd Belorussian Front to force the Berezina from the march and then to attack rapidly towards Minsk, with its right wing on Molodechno. 11th Guards Army was to complete its crossings by noon on July 1 and then develop the offensive towards Logoisk and Radashkovichy.

At 0500 hours on June 29 the 11th Guards Army renewed its offensive towards the Berezina, behind 5th Guards Tank Army. During the day the Army advanced 30 km and by the end of the day its forward detachments were 22–28 km east of the river. It arrived with its main forces along the east bank on the afternoon of June 30. Preceded by a 30-minute artillery preparation and heavy air attacks the 1st, 31st, 26th and 83rd Guards Divisions with the help of engineers crossed between 1600 and 1700 hours. Along with units of the 5th Guards Tank the 11th Guards liberated Borisov by the end of the day. The Army advanced decisively across the river on July 1, throwing the defenders 25–30 km to the west. By the end of the next day the entire 11th Guards had consolidated along a line from Lishitsy to Logoisk to Sarnatsk to Smolevichi. Minsk was liberated on the morning of July 3, primarily by units of 31st Army. On the same day 11th Guards advanced 30–35 km and took Radashkovichy. On July 10 the 26th Guards would be decorated with the Order of the Red Banner for its role in the fighting for Borisov and the Berezina.

=== Vilnius-Kaunas Offensive ===
On July 5, after liberating Molodechno, the 8th and 16th Guards Corps pushed on towards the Neman (Berezina) River which they reached and crossed the next day before running into the German defenses of the "East Wall" and being halted. This line was cracked by a deliberate attack beginning at midday on July 7 by the 8th Guards and the 3rd Guards Tank Corps despite stubborn resistance from elements of the 5th and 7th Panzer Divisions. On July 8 the leading units of 11th Guards Army advanced another 25–30 km and by now were approaching Vilnius, which held a garrison of about 15,000 men. While the battle for this city went on until the 13th forward detachments of 5th Guards Tank reached the Neman River, followed by the left flank and center forces of the Front. 11th Guards faced the relatively fresh 131st Infantry Division in the Rudiskes area. The following afternoon the 26th and 5th Guards Divisions forced the river south of Merech. By the end of July 15 the Army, in cooperation with 5th Army, had seized a bridgehead 28 km long and 2–6 km deep, while it also was maintaining a second bridgehead up to 6 km deep. These continued to expand in fighting through to the 20th while repelling German counterattacks, at which point the Front went over to a temporary defense. A further advance began on July 29 which gained 10–15 km. Kaunas was taken by 5th Army on August 1 and German forces continued falling back to the west. By now the 26th Guards had only one or two companies in each rifle battalion, each company averaged 25–30 men, and none more than 60; in addition the 57th Guards Artillery was lagging behind. In the battle for the Neman the division accounted for 400 German officers and soldiers killed and 600 taken prisoner, along with 37 tanks, 56 guns and 224 machine guns destroyed or taken as trophies.

== Into Germany ==
On October 16 the division, along with the rest of 11th Guards, began attacking into East Prussia as part of the Front's abortive Goldap-Gumbinnen Operation, which ended in early November. At about this time the 25th Guards Antitank Battalion had its towed guns replaced with 12 SU-76 self-propelled guns. In the planning for the Vistula-Oder Offensive the Army began in the second echelon of 3rd Belorussian Front, on a sector from Kybartai to Kaukern on the right and Millunen to Georgenburg on the left. The intermediate objective was to capture Insterburg by the end of the fifth day in cooperation with 28th Army. The offensive against East Prussia began on January 13, 1945, and on January 21 the Front commander, Army Gen. I. D. Chernyakhovsky, decided to use his 11th Guards, 5th and 28th Armies to encircle and eliminate the German Insterburg - Gumbinnen group of forces, with the objective of pursuing and advancing directly on Königsberg. Chernyakhovsky assigned 11th Guards and 5th Armies to encircle Insterburg and capture it on January 22.

In order to block the Soviet advance on Insterburg the German command organized a defense along a line from Lindenburg to Zaken to Insterburg, using remnants of three infantry divisions and other assorted troops. This was soon broken through by 16th Guards Rifle Corps supported by 2nd Guards Tank Corps. Meanwhile, to the right, the 8th Guards Corps attacked along the paved road from Gross Skeisgirren to Welau with the 26th Guards and 1st Tank Corps leading the pursuit towards the Pregel River. By 2100 hours on January 21 the division, having completed a 40 km march, reached Gross Schirrau. The 1st Tanks destroyed 11 German tanks and more than 100 motor vehicles and was rapidly approaching Wehlau. Altogether the 11th Guards Army advanced 45 km in two days, reaching the approaches to Insterburg while the 26th Guards and 1st Tanks deeply outflanked the German Insterburg - Gumbinnen grouping from the west. Chernyakhovsky now ordered the 11th Guards and 5th Armies to break through the German defensive line with a concentric attack from north, east and south. General Galitskiy decided to attack Insterburg at night with his 36th Guards Corps while the 16th and 8th Guards Corps developed the offensive, the latter towards Tapiau. By 0600 hours on January 22 Insterburg was completely cleared. On February 19 the division would be recognized for its part in the battle for Insterburg with the award of the Order of Suvorov, 2nd Degree.

8th Guards Corps advanced in the wake of 1st Tank Corps, which broke through into Tapiau from the northeast and by 2000 hours on January 22 reached the Deime River in the Friedrichsthal area. 8th Guards Corps outflanked Wehlau from the northeast with its 5th Guards Division and began fighting on the town's outskirts; the town was secured the next day. The Army was now ordered to attack from the line of the Alle River along the south bank of the Pregel and reach a line from Steinbeck to Grunbaum by the end of January 24. On the morning of January 30 forward detachments of the 26th Guards broke through the German defenses and reached the shore of the Frisches Haff, isolating Königsberg from the rest of Germany. The defenders reacted strongly and threw in heavy counterattacks with infantry and armor, led by elements of the Großdeutschland Panzer Division, eventually forcing the division to retreat. In the course of this fighting General Chernov was severely wounded and hospitalized as a result. While there, on April 19 he learned he had been made a Hero of the Soviet Union. Chernov eventually returned to command of the division during the summer.

=== Battle of Königsberg ===
On February 9 the 11th Guards along with the 43rd and 39th Armies, all operating close to Königsberg, were transferred to 1st Baltic Front while 3rd Belorussian focused on eliminating the large group of German forces in the western regions of East Prussia. As of February 24 the 1st Baltic was redesignated as the Zemland Group of Forces with the three armies and 3rd Air Army under command, now back as part of 3rd Belorussian Front. Before Königsberg could be reduced it was necessary to isolate it again. For this offensive the 11th Guards Army was detached from the Zemland Group. On March 13 the attack to the southwest began, following a 40-minute artillery preparation. The German forces put up particularly fierce resistance against the Army, which was attacking in the direction of Brandenburg. Its left flank was able to advance 2–3 km and the attack continued into the night and the following day through dense fog. On March 15 the 36th Guards Corps captured Wangitt on the Frisches Haff, again cutting communications with the city. By March 26 the 11th Guards was mopping up German remnants and preparing to return to the Zemland Group.

When the assault on Königsberg began on April 6 the 11th Guards was responsible for the attack from the south, with 8th Guards Corps on the right (east) flank. The German garrison numbered more than 100,000 men, with 850 guns and up to 60 tanks and assault guns. For the attack the Army was reinforced with the 23rd Tank Brigade, three self-propelled artillery regiments, a Guards heavy tank regiment, the 10th Artillery Division and many other artillery units. It faced the German 69th Infantry Division. On the first day, after a 90-minute artillery bombardment, the attack went in at noon. 36th and 16th Guards Corps on the left and center made the most progress, penetrating 4 km into the German defenses, blockading two forts, clearing 43 city blocks and beginning fighting for the railway station. On April 7 the Army continued fighting for the city's railroad junction, now assisted by heavy airstrikes. By the end of the day it had captured two forts and the suburbs of Zeligenfeld, Speihersdorf and Ponart. On the afternoon of April 8 it forced the Pregel to the northwest of Ponart and linked up with 43rd Army, cutting off the fortress from the forces of the German Samland Group and also capturing the port area. Over the following day German resistance slackened and by its end Königsberg had officially capitulated.

In the Samland offensive that followed beginning on April 13 the 11th Guards Army was initially in the Zemland Group's second echelon. It was committed into the first line overnight on April 17/18, relieving 2nd Guards Army on the Vistula Spit, facing the heavily fortified town of Pillau. After reconnaissance over the next two days the 16th and 36th Guards Corps attacked at 1100 hours on April 20 but made little progress, which did not change the following day. On April 22, after 8th Guards Corps was brought in as reinforcements, the German defense began to crack. Pillau finally fell on April 25.

== Postwar ==
When the fighting ended the men and women of the division shared the full title of 26th Guards Rifle, East Siberian, Gorodok, Order of the Red Banner, Order of Suvorov Division. (Russian: 26-я гвардейская Восточно-Сибирская Городокская Краснознамённая ордена Суворова дивизия.) On May 28, in recognition for their parts in the battle for Königsberg, the 75th and 77th Guards Rifle Regiments each received the Order of Suvorov, 3rd Degree, while the 57th Guards Artillery Regiment was decorated with the Order of Kutuzov, 3rd Degree. After returning from hospital General Chernov remained in command until April, 1947. The division remained in the Kaliningrad Oblast until it was converted in 1957 to the 26th Guards Motorized Rifle Division, at which time it was under the command of Hero of the Soviet Union Maj. Gen. Ivan Moiseevich Tretyak.
