= 83rd Guards Rifle Division =

- Active: 1943–1946
- Country: Soviet Union
- Branch: Red Army
- Type: Division
- Role: Infantry
- Engagements: Operation Kutuzov; Bryansk Offensive; Polotsk-Vitebsk Offensive; Vitebsk (Gorodok) Offensive; Operation Bagration; Vitebsk-Orsha Offensive; Minsk Offensive; Vilnius-Kaunas Offensive; Goldap-Gumbinnen Operation; Vistula-Oder Offensive; East Prussian Offensive; Heiligenbeil Pocket; Siege of Königsberg; Samland Offensive
- Decorations: Order of the Red Banner; Order of Suvorov
- Battle honours: Gorodok

Commanders
- Notable commanders: Maj. Gen. Yakov Stepanovich Vorobyov; Maj. Gen. Aleksei Grigorevich Maslov

The 83rd Guards Rifle Division was reformed as an elite infantry division of the Red Army in April 1943, based on the 2nd formation of the 97th Rifle Division. It served in that role until after the end of the Great Patriotic War. Throughout its combat path, it was considered a "sister" to the 84th Guards Rifle Division.

It was redesignated after the relatively minor battles along the front held by the 16th Army north of the Oryol salient during most of 1942 and into early 1943. Under a STAVKA directive of April 16, that Army was officially redesignated as the 11th Guards Army on May 1, 1943. The division was immediately assigned to the 8th Guards Rifle Corps, and it would serve under these commands for the duration of the war.

It re-entered the fighting in July, during the offensive for the liberation of the Oryol region. By early autumn, the entire Army was moved northward, becoming part of the 2nd Baltic Front before moving to the 1st Baltic Front. The 83rd Guards saw combat in the slow and bloody battles east and north of Vitebsk through the winter, during which it was awarded the Order of the Red Banner and, shortly after, a divisional honorific. Early during the summer offensive against Army Group Center, now as part of the 3rd Belorussian Front, the division further distinguished itself in crossing the Berezina River and liberating the city of Borisov, later receiving the Order of Suvorov. It then joined in the advance through Lithuania and into East Prussia, taking part in the siege and capture of Königsberg before moving with its Army to the Zemland Group of Forces and spending the last weeks of the war mopping up German resistance in the Baltic ports. Despite a notable record, the 83rd Guards was gradually disbanded from mid-1945 to mid-1946.

== Formation ==
The 83rd Guards was redesignated on April 10, 1943, in recognition of the 97th Rifle Division's steadfast qualities in positional fighting north of the Oryol salient through most of 1942 and early 1943, including the forcing of the Zhizdra River line in early April. It officially received its Guards banner on May 3. At that time, its order of battle became as follows:

- 248th Guards Rifle Regiment (from 69th Rifle Regiment)
- 250th Guards Rifle Regiment (from 136th Rifle Regiment)
- 252nd Guards Rifle Regiment (from 233rd Rifle Regiment)
- 187th Guards Artillery Regiment (from 41st Artillery Regiment)
- 89th Guards Antitank Battalion (later 89th Guards Self-Propelled Artillery Battalion)
- 84th Guards Reconnaissance Company
- 94th Guards Sapper Battalion
- 114th Guards Signal Battalion
- 90th Guards Medical/Sanitation Battalion
- 87th Guards Chemical Defense (Anti-gas) Company (from May 5, 1943, renumbered 68th)
- 85th Guards Motor Transport Company
- 81st Guards Field Bakery
- 86th Guards Divisional Veterinary Hospital
- 1664th Field Postal Station
- 1097th Field Office of the State Bank

The division continued under the command of Maj. Gen. Yakov Stepanovich Vorobyov, who had commanded the 97th since June 8, 1942. As of the beginning of June, it was in the 8th Guards Rifle Corps of Lt. Gen. I. K. Bagramyan's 11th Guards Army, on the southern flank of the Western Front along with the 4th Tank Army. The Corps also contained the 11th and 26th Guards Rifle Divisions.

== Operation Kutuzov ==
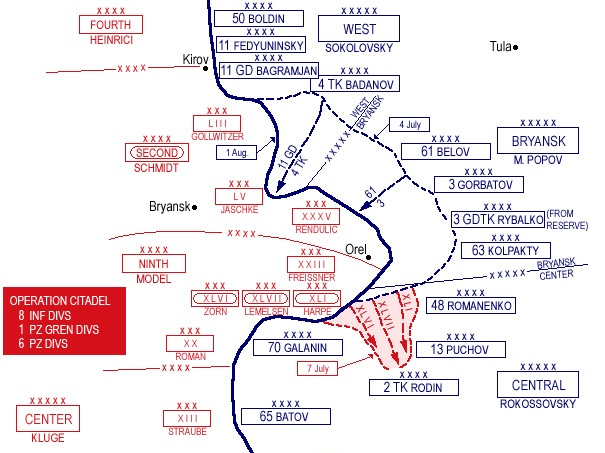
Operation Kutuzov. Note position of 11th Guards Army.

The German Operation Zitadelle officially ended on July 12, the same day that forces of the Western and Bryansk Fronts struck the positions of the 2nd Panzer Army on the north flank of the Oryol salient. The 8th Guards Corps was deployed with the 11th and 83rd Guards in first echelon, supported by the 43rd Guards Tank Brigade, the 2nd Guards Heavy Tank Regiment, and a self-propelled artillery regiment, while the 26th Guards was in second echelon. The Corps' attack was to be supported by the 3rd Artillery Division, an artillery regiment, a Guards Mortar Regiment, and a heavy-caliber artillery brigade. The Corps would make its main attack along the Army's right flank in the direction of Belyi Verkh and Obukhovo.

Following a massive preparatory bombardment, the 11th Guards Army achieved a deep penetration at the boundary between the German 211th and 293rd Infantry Divisions. General Bagramyan committed his mobile forces in the afternoon and advanced about 10–12 km. Army Group Center hurriedly brought up the 5th Panzer Division to mount a counterattack in the evening, which was unsuccessful. On the morning of July 13, the 8th Guards Corps renewed its attack. The 11th Guards Division, along with the 43rd Guards Tanks, battled in the direction of Staritsa, while the 83rd Guards and the 2nd Guards Heavy Tanks advanced toward Ulyanovo, outflanking it from the west and east. The German forces, making use of prepared positions, directed powerful interlocking fire and launched repeated counterattacks with tanks and infantry, which slowed the Soviet advance. A surprise thrust by the 11th Guards from the southeast cleared Staritsa by 1300 hours; this, in turn, weakened the defenses of Ulyanovo, and one rifle regiment of the 83rd Guards, with tank support, broke into it through its western outskirts. While the German garrison made every effort to throw this regiment out, the rest of the division, backed by most of the 2nd Guards Tank Corps, launched a powerful attack from the northeast. With the village outflanked from two sides, it was taken by 1430 hours, its garrison almost completely destroyed.

=== Battles for Yagodnaya ===
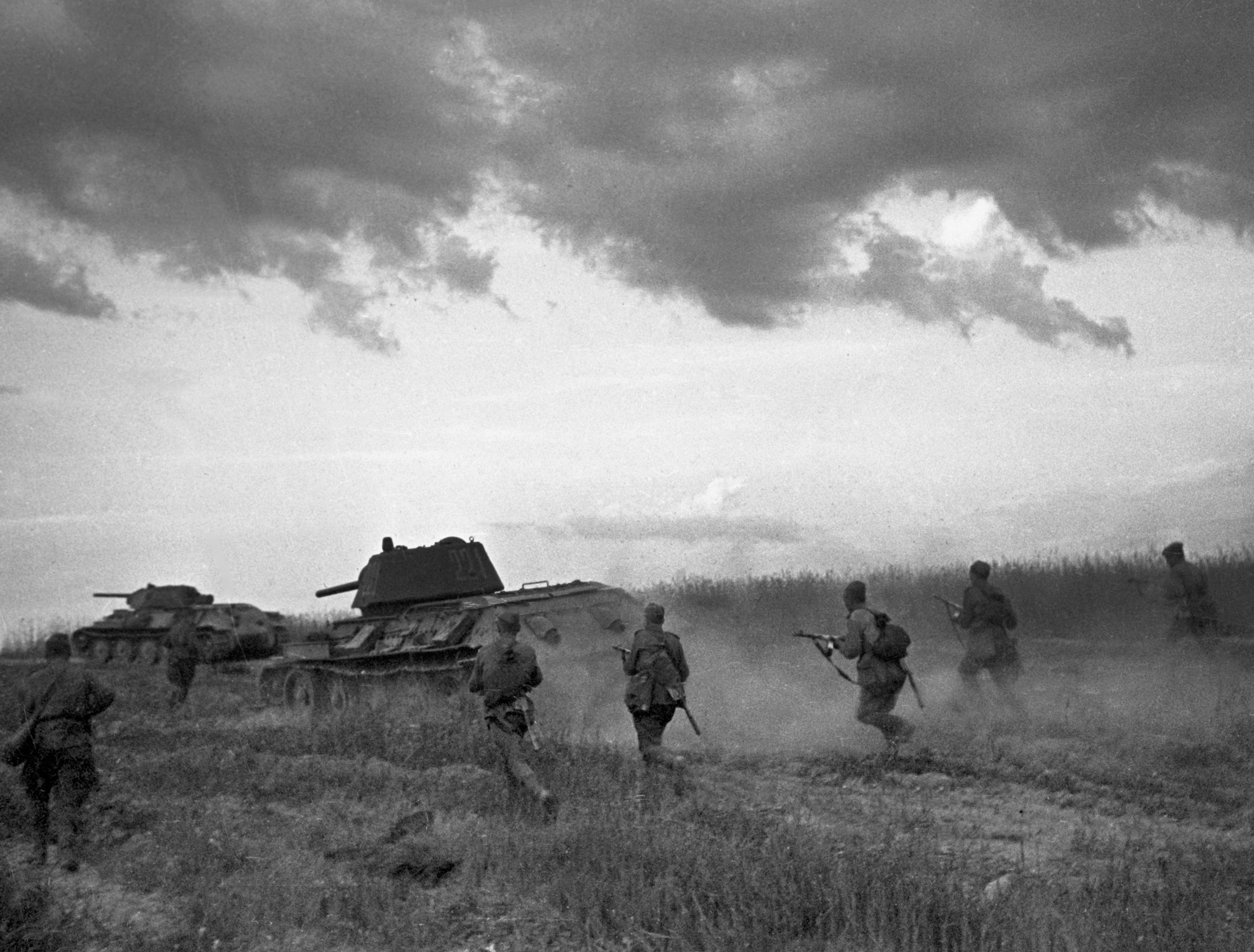
Red Army men advancing with T-34 tanks during Operation Kutuzov.

With the victories at Staritsa and Ulyanovo, General Bagramyan committed the 5th Tank Corps into the breach with the mission of attacking in the direction of Krapivna. The Corps' 70th Tank Brigade, reinforced with a battalion of the 83rd Guards, energetically pursued the German remnants falling back in disorder, forced the Vytebet River, broke into Yagodnaya, and, in the course of an advance of over 30 km in half a day of fighting, inflicted heavy losses. Bagramyan became uneasy at having this force so far in advance (up to 15 km) of the remainder of 5th Tanks and ordered it to fall back from Yagodnaya to the Krapivna area; it would later take two days of stubborn fighting with newly arrived German reserves to retake Yagodnaya. Meanwhile, the remainder of the division, with the rest of 8th Guards Corps, developed the offensive to the south, reaching a line from Senichkin to Krakhmalnyi Zavod.

On July 14, the 83rd and 26th Guards Divisions, in conjunction with units of the 5th and 1st Tank Corps, launched a powerful attack and completely destroyed the 350th Security Battalion, routed the remaining German covering units, captured Afonasova, Melekhova, Shvanova, and Sopovo, and seized crossings over the Vytebet east of Melekhova. Overnight, the 2nd Panzer Army concentrated elements of the 18th and 20th Panzer Divisions in the Yagodnaya area. The commander of 8th Guards Corps, Lt. Gen. P. F. Malyshev, knowing the extent of German fortifications, declined to directly attack Yagodnaya and chose to force the Vytebet in the Shvanova area. The 83rd Guards and the main forces of the 5th Tanks concentrated in the Shvanova - Sopovo area in order to outflank Yagodnaya from the south, while the 26th Guards, with tank support, would do the same from the north. The attack began on the morning of July 15, and, following massed artillery fire, the division forced the Vytebet in a headlong attack with the tanks close behind. Despite stubborn resistance and counterattacks aimed at guarding the road to Bolkhov, the Yagodnaya garrison was threatened with complete encirclement, and, after abandoning its wounded, heavy weapons, and other equipment, began falling back hurriedly to the southeast.

The 1st Tank Corps crossed the Vytebet behind the 83rd Guards and the 5th Tanks and, as called for by the operational plan, turned sharply to the south. Together with the 250th Guards Rifle Regiment, they moved in the direction of Uzkoe. This maneuver was unexpected by the defenders, and the combined force reached the Studenka - Gnezdilovo - Selikhovo area on July 16, seriously threatening the left flank of the German Bolkhov group of forces. Meanwhile, the remainder of the 8th Guards Corps reached a line from Zhuevka to Mashok but was facing increasing resistance from German reserves, soon including the 9th Panzer and parts of the 4th Panzer and 10th Motorized Divisions. The Corps was also reinforced with the 108th Rifle Division which, in cooperation with the 5th Tanks, cut the Bolkhov - Khotynets road by July 19.

=== Battles for Bolkhov ===
On July 20, the German forces went over to the counterattack, soon clearing the road but failing to encircle and eliminate the 108th Division. These attacks continued until late on July 22 and forced Soviet withdrawals on several sectors, but were halted by the 8th and 36th Guards Rifle Corps and the 25th Tank Corps. These forces renewed their offensive the next day and by the end of July 25 had reached a jumping-off point for a decisive attack to eliminate the German Bolkhov grouping in cooperation with the 61st Army of the Bryansk Front. The 8th Guards Corps had finished a regrouping along a line from Stolbchee to Kozyulkina to Krivchee.

By July 26, after several delays, the 4th Tank Army had reached the front. The 11th Guards Army was to break through the German defense with the 8th and 36th Guards Corps and create a breach for the 4th Tank Army, then follow in the direction of Borilovo. The assault began that day following a powerful one-hour artillery preparation, but encountered a stubborn and well-organized defense and failed to break through. The Soviet command was forced to commit the 4th Tank Army to complete the breach while still facing a strong antitank defense which claimed many vehicles and limited the penetration to just 3 km in depth. However, the defenders were also shaken, and overnight received orders to abandon Bolkhov while continuing to hold the road to Khotynets. Intense fighting continued into July 27, and two days later, the 11th Guards Army completed its breakthrough, while the 61st Army finished clearing Bolkhov. By July 30, the 8th Guards Corps, in close coordination with units of the 4th Tank Army, was pursuing the remnants of the Bolkhov grouping and had reached a line from Proletarskii to Bolshaya Chern to outside Krivchevskii.

=== Battles for Khotynets ===
By the beginning of August, the 11th Guards Army had been transferred to the Bryansk Front. From July 31 to August 5, the Army, along with the 4th Tank Army, was involved in stubborn fighting for control of the paved road and railroad between Oryol and Bryansk. By the morning of August 6, the 11th Guards had handed over its right-flank sector to the 11th Army and had regrouped for an offensive on Khotynets. The 8th Guards Corps deployed on a 5 km-wide front on a line between Brezhnevskii and Upenskii and given the immediate objectives of Androsovo and Bolshie Ryabinki with the support of the 25th Tank Corps. The 11th Guards Army as a whole was to break through between Ilinskoe and Gnezdilovo to create a breach for 4th Tanks and then encircle and capture Khotynets before developing the offensive toward Karachev.

The renewed offensive began with reconnaissance operations by each first-echelon division at 0600 hours, followed by an artillery and airstrike preparation at noon. The 8th and 36th Guards Corps, with heavy tank support, went over to the attack at 1300 and quickly broke through the forward edge of the German defense, which was soon falling back to its intermediate line. By 1530 hours, the infantry had penetrated up to 3 km, and the 25th Tank Corps was committed at 1700. Despite these initial successes, the German forces used broken ground and village strongpoints to delay the offensive. On August 8, units of the 25th Panzergrenadier Division appeared on the approaches to Khotynets. Further reserves arrived the next day and two armored trains were coursing along the railroad. Despite this, on August 9, fighting began on the immediate approaches to the town and individual strongpoints changed hands several times. Units of the 8th Guards Corps and the 25th Tank Corps outflanked Khotynets from the south, cut the railroad, and reached to within 1,000 m of Khotynets station while also reaching a line along its eastern outskirts. The town was now outflanked from three sides, and on the morning of August 10 was completely cleared of German forces as remnants fell back to the west; the battle had cost them 7,500 officers and men, 70 armored vehicles, and 176 guns and mortars. In the pursuit the next day, the Corps reached from Yakovlevo to Dronovo.

The immediate fighting for Karachev began at 0300 hours on August 15. In order to hold the town, which was an important road junction and supply base, the German command had concentrated units of the 78th Assault Division and 38th Infantry Division, plus remnants of the 253rd and 293rd Infantry, 18th and 8th Panzer Divisions, and the 45th Security Regiment. The 11th Guards Army committed the 16th Guards and 84th Guards Divisions against the town from the east and southeast. These were assisted in part by the 83rd Guards, which attacked Karachev from the southeast and captured the strongpoints of Height 246.1 and Glybochka. The left-wing forces of the 8th Guards Corps forced the Snezhet River after outflanking the town from the south. Having crushed German resistance along the surrounding heights and villages, the Soviet forces broke into Karachev at 0830 hours and completely occupied it.

== Into Belarus ==
Beginning on September 1, the 11th Guards Army took part in the operations that liberated Bryansk. On September 19, two days after the city was cleared, the Army began withdrawing from the front lines. The Bryansk Front was disbanded on October 10, and the Army, along with the Front headquarters, moved northwest to be incorporated into the new Baltic Front (ten days later, the 2nd Baltic Front), but at noon on November 18, the 11th Guards was moved to the 1st Baltic Front, which was now under command of General Bagramyan.

Given the complex situation in the Nevel region, where the 3rd and 4th Shock Armies had carved out a large salient behind the lines of German 16th Army (Army Group North) and 3rd Panzer Army (Army Group Center), Bagramyan planned an attack along the Gorodok - Vitebsk axis with the 11th Guards Army. Five divisions were concentrated on an 8 km-wide sector, with the 8th Guards Corps (now 5th, 26th, and 83rd Guards and 29th Rifle Divisions) in second echelon. In the event, the STAVKA delayed the start of the offensive until November 26, but an unseasonal thaw forced a further delay into early December.

=== Battle for Gorodok ===
The offensive was finally able to proceed on December 13. The 8th Guards Corps attacked the northern tip of the German-held Ezerishche salient north of Vitebsk, on both sides of Lake Ezerishche, with the 83rd Guards in first echelon. The initial objective was to cut off the northwestern portion of the salient in cooperation with 4th Shock Army and destroy the German grouping southwest of the lake. Subsequently, the objective was to develop the attack in the direction of Mekhovoe and Gorodok before driving south to seize Vitebsk. The 11th Guards Army faced the 129th Infantry and 6th Luftwaffe Field Divisions of German IX Army Corps.

The 11th Guards Army kicked off after a two-hour artillery preparation, without air support due to poor flying weather. Little progress was made, apart from on the sector of the 84th Guards Division, but even this was soon halted by German reserves. After an overnight regrouping, the 83rd Guards, supported by the 1st Tank Corps and another artillery preparation, broke through on this sector. This attack completely compromised the German defenses and soon cut the Gorodok-Nevel road in the rear of IX Corps. Early on December 15, despite counterattacks by the 20th Panzer Division, forward elements of the 156th Rifle Division of the 4th Shock had linked up near Laptevka with the 83rd Guards and 29th Rifle Divisions, completely encircling the 87th Infantry Division and part of the 129th. A larger encirclement was completed the next day containing the remainder of IX Corps. With this completed, the 8th Guards Corps took part in reducing the German pocket in two days of heavy fighting; according to Soviet sources, 20,000 German troops became casualties, while German sources admit to just over 2,000. For its part in this encirclement operation, on December 21, the 83rd Guards would be decorated with the Order of the Red Banner.

What remained of the German forces fell back to more defensible lines to the south. After a complex regrouping, the 11th Guards Army resumed its advance on December 23. General Bagramyan stated in his memoirs:

"The 11th Guards Army's commander was inclined to give his forces the opportunity to rest on the night of 24 December and continue the operation at first light. However after a comprehensive discussion of that question... we decided to carry out a night assault... The attack signal was given to the 83rd and 26th Guards Rifle Divisions, which were operating from the west, and the 11th Guards, which was attacking from the east, at 0200 hours. As we expected, after the initial shock generated by a surprise night attack by infantry and tanks, the enemy resisted fiercely along both axes... Having waited for the moment when combat in both attack sectors reached a fever pitch, I ordered General K. N. Galitskiy to throw Major General N. L. Soldatov's 5th Guards Division into the storm of the city..."

Gorodok was cleared later that day, and the division was one of the four noted above that were awarded its name as an honorific:

GORODOK (Vitebsk Oblast)... 83rd Guards Rifle Division (Major General Vorobyov, Yakov Stepanovich)... The troops who participated in the liberation of Gorodok, by the order of the Supreme High Command of 24 December 1943, and a commendation in Moscow, are given a salute of 12 artillery salvoes from 124 guns.

In his memoirs, Galitskiy states that the slowness of the offensive was largely due to deteriorating strength of his forces. Following the battle for Gorodok, his Army continued to face stubborn resistance and advanced only 4–5 km by the end of December 25, being "halted by powerful and carefully organized artillery-mortar and machine-gun fire and also by enemy counterattacks." This was based on a fortified line which was part of the external defense belt around Vitebsk, 25 km from the center of the city, and Galitskiy's forces spent several days assessing it; it became clear that the goal of liberating the city by December 30–31 in conjunction with the 4th Shock was unrealistic. From December 25–31, the Army gradually wedged its way into the German positions, with the 26th, 11th, and 31st Guards Divisions making the greatest progress, but even this amounted to just 5–7 km of ground gained. The fighting continued into early January 1944, but was beginning to tail off by January 5, as both sides exhausted themselves. A last gasp effort began the next day, when the 26th and 83rd Guards made a supporting attack in the sector north of Mashkina.

On January 9, 1944, General Vorobyov left the division to take command of the 16th Guards Rifle Corps; he would go on to lead the 62nd Rifle Corps and would be named a Hero of the Soviet Union in April 1945 as well as promoted to the rank of lieutenant general the same month. He was replaced in command of the 83rd Guards by Maj. Gen. Aleksei Grigorevich Maslov, who had been serving as chief of staff of the 36th Guards Corps. By January 14, the 1st Baltic Front went over to the defense in front of Vitebsk, but this was temporary as the STAVKA ordered Bagramyan to begin a new attack southeast toward Vitebsk to begin at first light on February 2, on a 12 km-wide sector from Mashkina past Lake Zaronovskoe to Gorbachi, facing a partly-rebuilt 87th Infantry and battlegroups from the 12th Infantry, 20th Panzer, and 201st Security Divisions. The 8th Guards Corps was in the Army's first echelon along with 36th Guards Corps, and they had 1st Tank Corps in support.

Altogether, Bagramyan was able to concentrate 14 understrength rifle divisions and two tank corps for this effort, a far from overwhelming advantage, especially given mid-winter conditions. Following an extensive artillery preparation, the assaults quickly overcame the forward defenses of the 87th and 12th Divisions and, in two days of heavy fighting, advanced up to 3.5 km on a 9 km-wide front. The 83rd Guards took the German strongpoint at Mashkina from the 87th Infantry; the LIII Army Corps was forced to again withdraw this badly shaken division from the front and replace it with fresher troops from 20th Panzer.

By the end of February 3, the Front's shock groups had made enough progress that Bagramyan authorized the second echelon divisions into combat, and the next morning, the 1st and 5th Tank Corps were also committed, while the 5th Guards Division reinforced the 8th Guards Corps. In two days of heavy fighting, these reinforcements advanced another 4 km, but were halted by German counterattacks just 15 km northwest of downtown Vitebsk. A further effort began on February 15 and made some limited progress, but by now, the Front's rifle divisions were reduced to under 3,000 men each, with limited ammunition available, and the two tank corps counted fewer than two dozen operational vehicles between them. Bending to reality, the STAVKA ordered Bagramyan to suspend the offensive late on February 16.

== Operation Bagration ==
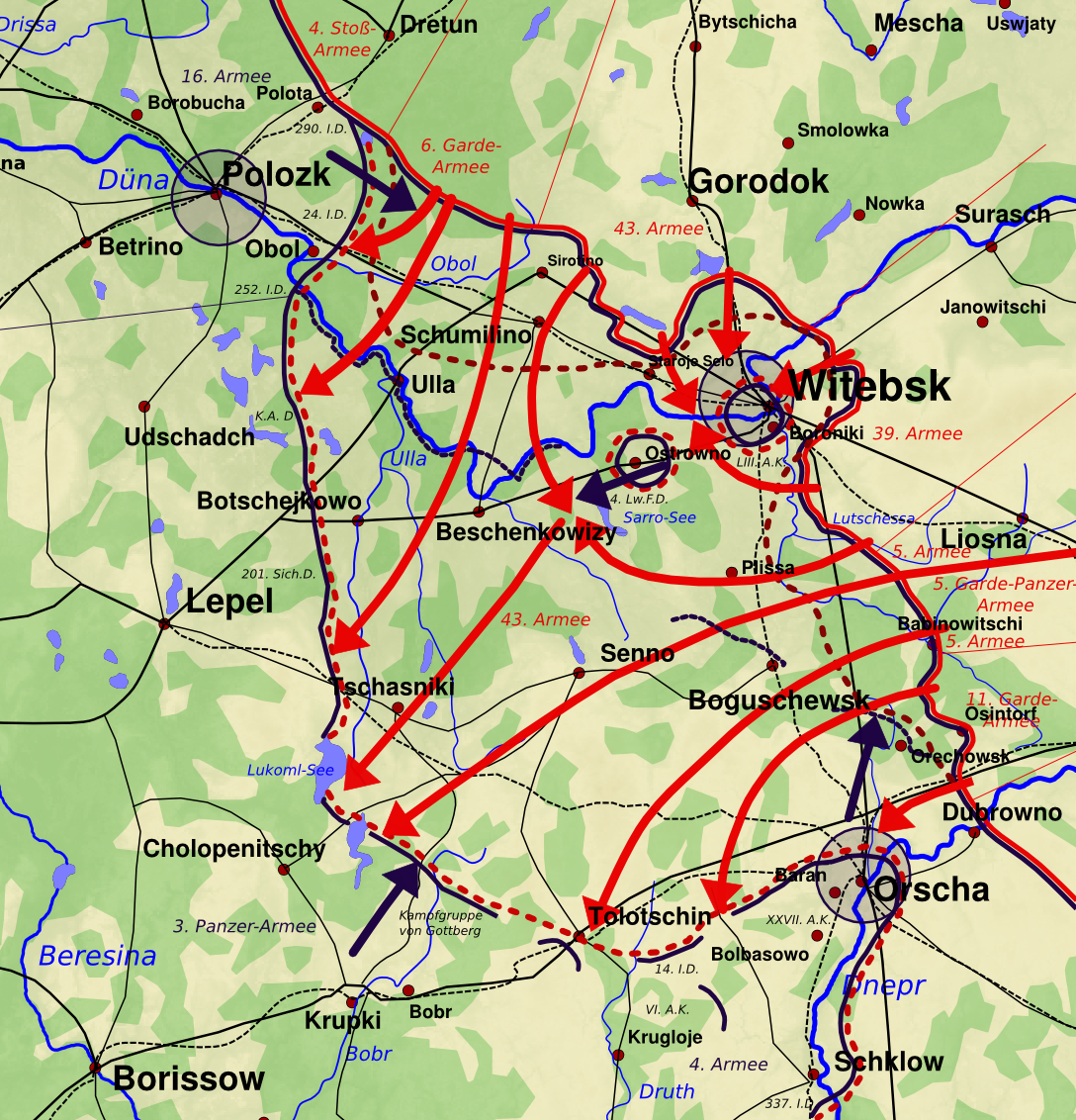
Map of the Vitebsk–Orsha Offensive, June 23–28, 1944. Note position of 11th Guards Army northeast of Orsha.

In April, as part of the preparations for the summer offensive, the 11th Guards Army was removed to the Reserve of the Supreme High Command, before being reassigned to the new 3rd Belorussian Front in May. On June 3, Senior Sergeant Nikifor Samsonovich Afanasyev was made a Hero of the Soviet Union. He had volunteered as a sniper in May 1942 while serving in the 136th Rifle Regiment of the 97th Rifle Division, based on his experience as a hunter and herder in Siberia. Before being wounded and hospitalized on February 23, 1943, he had been officially credited with 202 kills.

After returning to the now 250th Guards Rifle Regiment, he personally trained 17 snipers, some of whom also ran up high scores. During an action in April 1944, he destroyed four German firing points in hand-to-hand combat, killing seven and capturing six men before being again severely wounded. He was unable to return to the front, but continued training snipers in the Far East. In 1950, he had his Gold Star revoked for embezzlement of collective farm funds, but it was restored in 1970 after he redeemed himself with many years of work as a herd keeper. He retired to Ulan-Ude and died in 1980.

While in reserve, the Army trained intensively in the forests of the Nevel region and received over 20,000 replacements, bringing the 83rd Guards and the rest of its rifle divisions to an average of 7,200 personnel each. Beginning on May 25, the Army moved up well behind the front of 3rd Belorussian, followed by a secret move of 300 km on June 12–13 to a sector north of the Dniepr River, 30 km northeast of Orsha, replacing elements of 31st Army. General Galitskiy screened most of his sector with the 16th Guards Corps, while the 8th and 36th Guards Corps concentrated on a narrow sector adjacent to the 31st Army. On June 22, the 8th Guards Corps was crammed into less than 10 km with the 36th Guards Corps and had two heavy tank regiments and two assault gun regiments attached. It faced elements of the XXVII Army Corps of the German 4th Army, primarily the 78th Assault Division that the division had faced at Karachev.

=== Vitebsk-Orsha Offensive ===
General Galitskiy decided to launch his main attack along the highway to Minsk on a sector from Ostrov Yurev to Kirieva. The immediate objective was to break through the German defense and pave the way for the 2nd Guards Tank Corps to seize the line of the Orshitsa River by the end of the first day. The 8th Guards Corps, in the Army's center, would attack the sector from Osintroi to Slepin towards Zabezhnitsa, seize a line from outside Brokhovskie to Height 172.3 (2 km west of Zabezhnitsa), and then develop its offensive towards Selekta.

Along with the other first-echelon divisions of its Front, the 83rd Guards prepared a forward battalion to take part in a reconnaissance in force, which was conducted through the afternoon and evening of June 22, supported by a 25-minute artillery preparation. While the main purpose of this reconnaissance was to uncover the German fire system, seizing their forward defenses was a secondary goal. While the battalions of 5th Army to the north had considerable success in this regard, those of 11th Guards Army generally failed, including that of the division. Following an intensive artillery and airstrike preparation, the Front's main offensive began at 0900 hours on June 23. The 8th and 36th Guards Corps encountered fierce resistance from the 78th Assault Division and other German units and only advanced 2 km through the day. As a result, the 2nd Guards Tank Corps remained in its jumping-off positions. At 0850 hours on June 24, following a 40-minute artillery preparation, the 11th Guards Army resumed its offensive. While 8th and 16th Guards Corps advanced as much as 14 km during the day, the 36th Corps had still not cleared a path for the commitment of the 2nd Guards Tank Corps, and soon became caught up in the fighting for Orsha.

=== Minsk Offensive ===
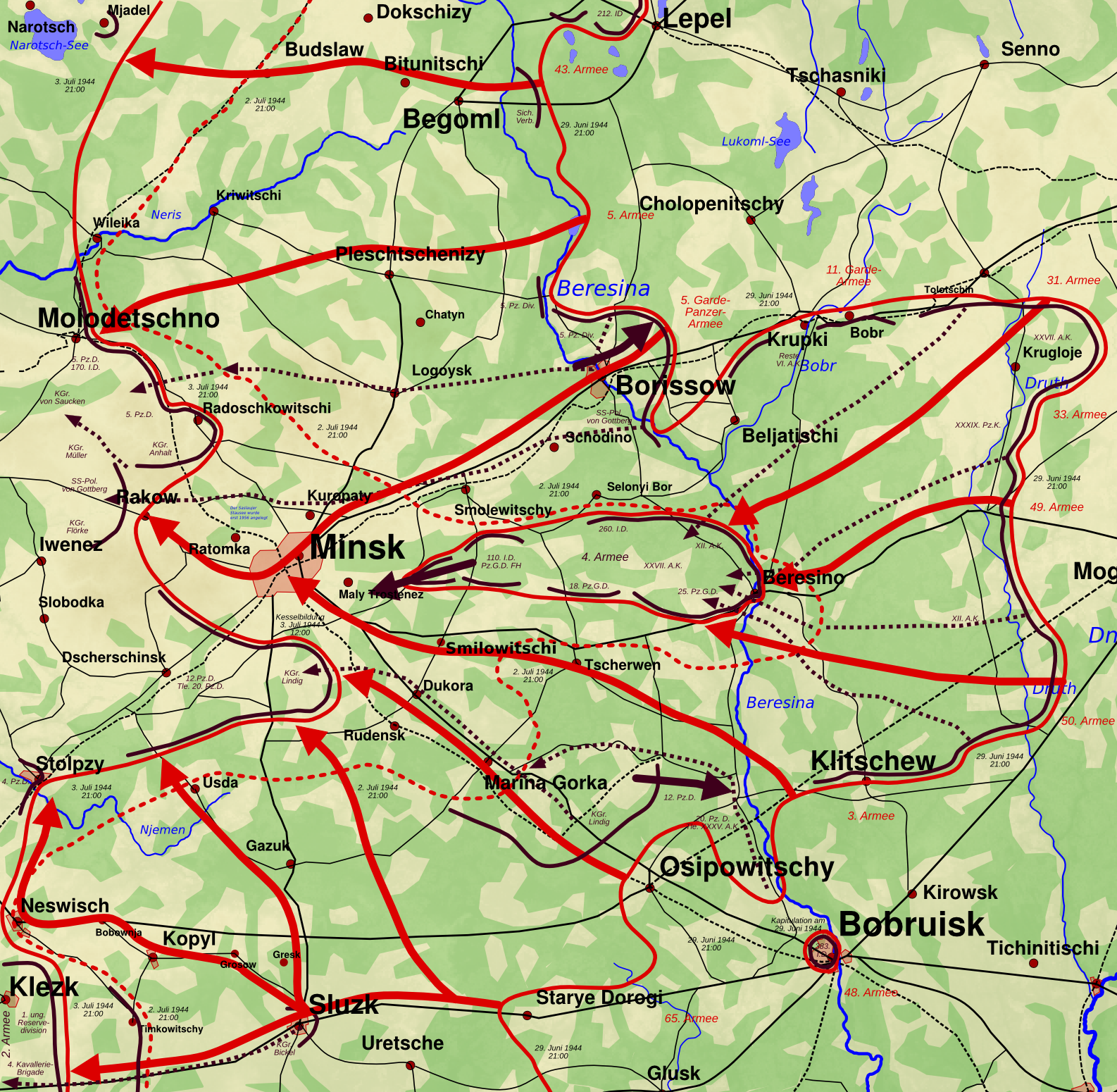
Map of Minsk Offensive. Note positions of 11th Guards Army.

On June 25, the Army focused its efforts on the sector of the 16th Guards Corps, which threw the German forces back another 7–12 km and was by now deeply outflanking Orsha from the north. On June 26, the two leading Corps of 11th Guards attacked towards Borisov to prevent the 4th Army from withdrawing across the Berezina River. In the course of the day, they advanced 20–25 km to the west, supported by the 2nd Guards Tank Corps, while destroying retiring German rearguards. Over the next two days, the pursuit unfolded at high speed. The Army's forward detachments covered another 50–65 km and, in conjunction with the 5th Guards Tank Army, was deeply enveloping the left flank of the German 4th Army, which was withdrawing to the west, south of the Orsha-Borisov railroad. The STAVKA now issued Directive No. 220124, ordering the 3rd Belorussian Front to force the Berezina from the march and then to attack rapidly towards Minsk, with its right wing on Molodechno. The 11th Guards Army was to complete its crossings by noon on July 1 and then develop the offensive towards Logoisk and Radashkovichy.

At 0500 hours on June 29, the 11th Guards Army renewed its offensive towards the Berezina, behind 5th Guards Tank Army. During the day, the Army advanced 30 km, and by the end of the day, its forward detachments were 22–28 km east of the river. It arrived with its main forces along the east bank on the afternoon of June 30. Preceded by a 30-minute artillery preparation and heavy air attacks, the 1st, 31st, 26th, and 83rd Guards Divisions, with the help of engineers, crossed between 1600 and 1700 hours. Along with units of the 5th Guards Tank, the 11th Guards liberated Borisov by the end of the day. The Army advanced decisively across the river on July 1, throwing the defenders 25–30 km to the west. By the end of the next day, the entire 11th Guards had consolidated along a line from Lishitsy to Logoisk to Sarnatsk to Smolevichi. Minsk was liberated on the morning of July 3, primarily by units of 31st Army. On the same day, the 11th Guards advanced 30–35 km and took Radashkovichy. On July 10, the 83rd Guards would be decorated with the Order of Suvorov, 2nd Degree, for its role in the fighting for Borisov and the Berezina.

=== Vilnius-Kaunas Offensive ===
On July 5, after liberating Molodechno, the 8th and 16th Guards Corps pushed on towards the Neman (Berezina) River, which they reached and crossed the next day before running into the German defenses of the "East Wall" and being halted. This line was cracked by a deliberate attack beginning at midday on July 7 by the 8th Guards Corps and the 3rd Guards Tank Corps, despite stubborn resistance from elements of the 5th and 7th Panzer Divisions. On July 8, the leading units of the 11th Guards Army advanced another 25–30 km and by now were approaching Vilnius, which held a garrison of about 15,000 men. While the battle for this city went on until the 13th forward detachments of 5th Guards Tank reached the Neman River, followed by the left flank and center forces of the Front. The 11th Guards faced the relatively fresh 131st Infantry Division in the Rudiskes area.

The following afternoon, the 26th and 5th Guards Divisions forced the river south of Merech while the 83rd Guards' attacks on the town were repelled. By the end of July 15, the Army, in cooperation with the 5th Army, had seized a bridgehead 28 km long and 2–6 km deep, while it also maintained a second bridgehead up to 6 km deep. These continued to expand in fighting through to the 20th while repelling German counterattacks, at which point the Front went over to a temporary defense. A further advance began on July 29, which gained 10–15 km. Kaunas was taken by the 5th Army on August 1, and German forces continued falling back to the west. By now, the 83rd Guards had only one or two companies in each rifle battalion, each company averaging 25–30 men, none more than 60. On July 29, General Maslov returned to command of the division for the duration of the war; he had been temporarily replaced by Col. Aleksei Petrovich Sokolov from February 20–28 and from July 20 to this date.

== Into Germany ==
On October 16, the division, along with the rest of the 11th Guards, began attacking into East Prussia as part of the Front's abortive Goldap-Gumbinnen Operation, which ended in early November. At about this time, the 89th Guards Antitank Battalion had its towed guns replaced with 12 SU-76 self-propelled guns. In the planning for the Vistula-Oder Offensive, the Army began in the second echelon of 3rd Belorussian Front, on a sector from Kybartai to Kaukern on the right and Millunen to Georgenburg on the left. The intermediate objective was to capture Insterburg by the end of the fifth day in cooperation with the 28th Army. The offensive against East Prussia began on January 13, 1945, and on January 21, the Front commander, Army Gen. I. D. Chernyakhovsky, decided to use his 11th Guards, 5th and 28th Armies to encircle and eliminate the German Insterburg - Gumbinnen group of forces, with the objective of pursuing and advancing directly on Königsberg. Chernyakhovsky assigned the 11th Guards and 5th Armies to encircle Insterburg and capture it on January 22.

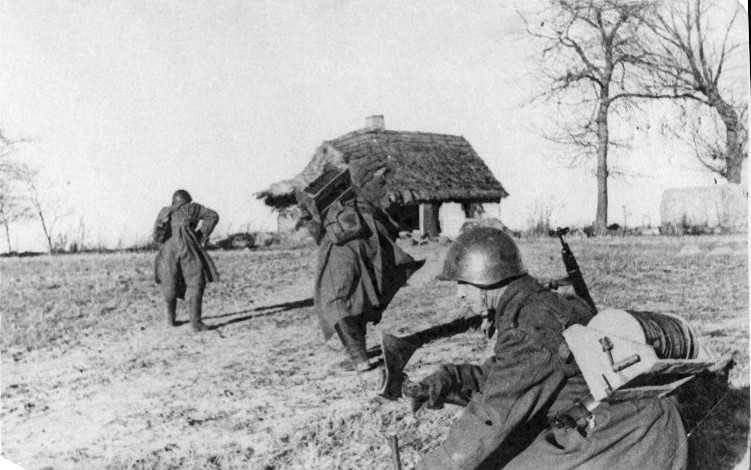
Signalmen of the 252nd Guards Rifle Regiment laying down line near Gumbinnen, January 13, 1945.

In order to block the Soviet advance on Insterburg, the German command organized a defense along a line from Lindenburg to Zaken to Insterburg, using remnants of three infantry divisions and other assorted troops. This was soon broken through by the 16th Guards Rifle Corps, supported by the 2nd Guards Tank Corps. Meanwhile, to the right, the 8th Guards Corps attacked along the paved road from Gross Skeisgirren to Welau, with the 26th Guards and 1st Tank Corps leading the pursuit towards the Pregel River.

By 2100 hours on January 21, the 1st Tank Corps had destroyed 11 German tanks and more than 100 motor vehicles and was rapidly approaching Wehlau. Altogether, the 11th Guards Army advanced 45 km in two days, reaching the approaches to Insterburg while the 26th Guards and the 1st Tank Corps deeply outflanked the German Insterburg - Gumbinnen grouping from the west. Chernyakhovsky now ordered the 11th Guards and 5th Armies to break through the German defensive line with a concentric attack from north, east, and south. General Galitskiy decided to attack Insterburg at night with his 36th Guards Corps, while the 16th and 8th Guards Corps developed the offensive, the latter towards Tapiau. By 0600 hours on January 22, Insterburg was completely cleared.

The 8th Guards Corps advanced in the wake of the 1st Tank Corps, which broke through into Tapiau from the northeast, and by 2000 hours on January 22, reached the Deime River in the Friedrichsthal area. The 8th Guards Corps outflanked Wehlau from the northeast with its 5th Guards Division and began fighting on the town's outskirts; the town was secured the next day. The Army was now ordered to attack from the line of the Alle River along the south bank of the Pregel and reach a line from Steinbeck to Grunbaum by the end of January 24.

=== Battle of Königsberg ===
On the morning of January 30, forward detachments of the 26th Guards broke through the German defenses and reached the shore of the Frisches Haff, isolating Königsberg from the rest of Germany, while the 83rd and 5th Guards attacked and took several concrete fortifications in the city's outer defensive zone. On February 9, the 11th Guards, along with the 43rd and 39th Armies, all operating close to Königsberg, were transferred to the 1st Baltic Front, while the 3rd Belorussian focused on eliminating the large group of German forces in the western regions of East Prussia. As of February 24, the 1st Baltic was redesignated as the Zemland Group of Forces, with the three armies and 3rd Air Army under command, now back as part of the 3rd Belorussian Front.

Before Königsberg could be reduced, it was necessary to isolate it again. For this offensive, the 11th Guards Army was detached from the Zemland Group. On March 13, the attack to the southwest began, following a 40-minute artillery preparation. The German forces put up particularly fierce resistance against the Army, which was attacking in the direction of Brandenburg. Its left flank was able to advance 2–3 km, and the attack continued into the night and the following day through dense fog. On March 15, the 36th Guards Corps captured Wangitt on the Frisches Haff, again cutting communications with the city. By March 26, the 11th Guards was mopping up German remnants and preparing to return to the Zemland Group.

When the assault on Königsberg began on April 6, the 11th Guards was responsible for the attack from the south, with the 8th Guards Corps on the right (east) flank. The German garrison numbered more than 100,000 men, with 850 guns and up to 60 tanks and assault guns. For the attack, the Army was reinforced with the 23rd Tank Brigade, three self-propelled artillery regiments, a Guards heavy tank regiment, the 10th Artillery Division, and many other artillery units. It faced the German 69th Infantry Division.

On the first day, after a 90-minute artillery bombardment, the attack went in at noon. The 36th and 16th Guards Corps on the left and center made the most progress, penetrating 4 km into the German defenses, blockading two forts, clearing 43 city blocks, and beginning fighting for the railway station. On April 7, the Army continued fighting for the city's railroad junction, now assisted by heavy airstrikes. By the end of the day, it had captured two forts and the suburbs of Zeligenfeld, Speihersdorf, and Ponart. On the afternoon of April 8, it forced the Pregel to the northwest of Ponart and linked up with the 43rd Army, cutting off the fortress from the forces of the German Samland Group and capturing the port area. Over the following day, German resistance slackened, and by its end, Königsberg had officially capitulated.

In the Samland offensive that followed beginning on April 13, the 11th Guards Army was initially in the Zemland Group's second echelon. It was committed into the first line overnight on April 17/18, relieving the 2nd Guards Army on the Vistula Spit, facing the heavily fortified town of Pillau. After reconnaissance over the next two days, the 16th and 36th Guards Corps attacked at 1100 hours on April 20 but made little progress, which did not change the following day. On April 22, after 8th Guards Corps was brought in as reinforcements, the German defense began to crack. Pillau finally fell on April 25.

== Postwar ==
When the fighting ended, the men and women of the division shared the full title of 83rd Guards Rifle, Gorodok, Order of the Red Banner, Order of Suvorov Division. (Russian: 83-я гвардейская Городокская Краснознамённая ордена Суворова дивизия.) On May 17, in recognition for their parts in the battle for the fortress and city of Königsberg, the 248th and 252nd Guards Rifle Regiments were decorated, the former with the Order of Kutuzov, 3rd Degree, while the latter received the Order of Suvorov, 3rd Degree. The division was eventually disbanded in August 1946.
