= Yezyaryshcha =

Urban-type settlement in Vitebsk Region, Belarus

Yezyaryshcha Езярышча (Belarusian) Езерище (Russian)
- Urban-type settlement
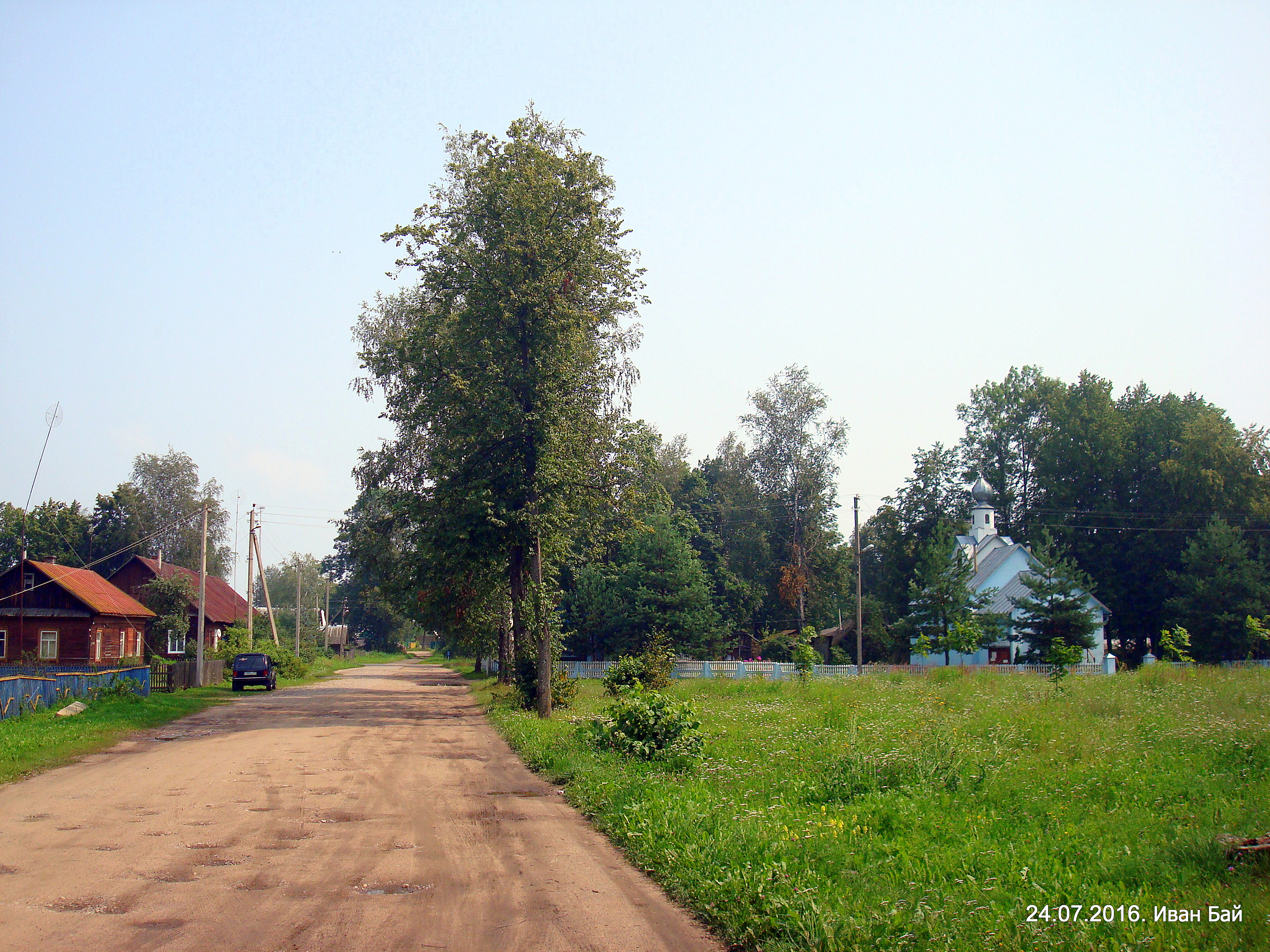

- Location within Belarus
- Coordinates: 55°50′05″N 29°59′05″E
- Country: Belarus
- Region: Vitebsk Region
- District: Haradok District

Population (2024)
  - Total: 1,054
- Time zone: UTC+3 (MSK)

Yezyaryshcha (Belarusian: Езярышча, romanized: Jeziaryšča; Russian: Езерище, romanized: Yezerishche) is an urban-type settlement in Haradok District, Vitebsk Region, Belarus. It is located next to the border with Russia. As of 2024, it has a population of 1,054.
