= Haradok district =

District of Vitebsk region, Belarus

Haradok district Гарадоцкі раён (Belarusian)
- District
- Flag Coat of arms

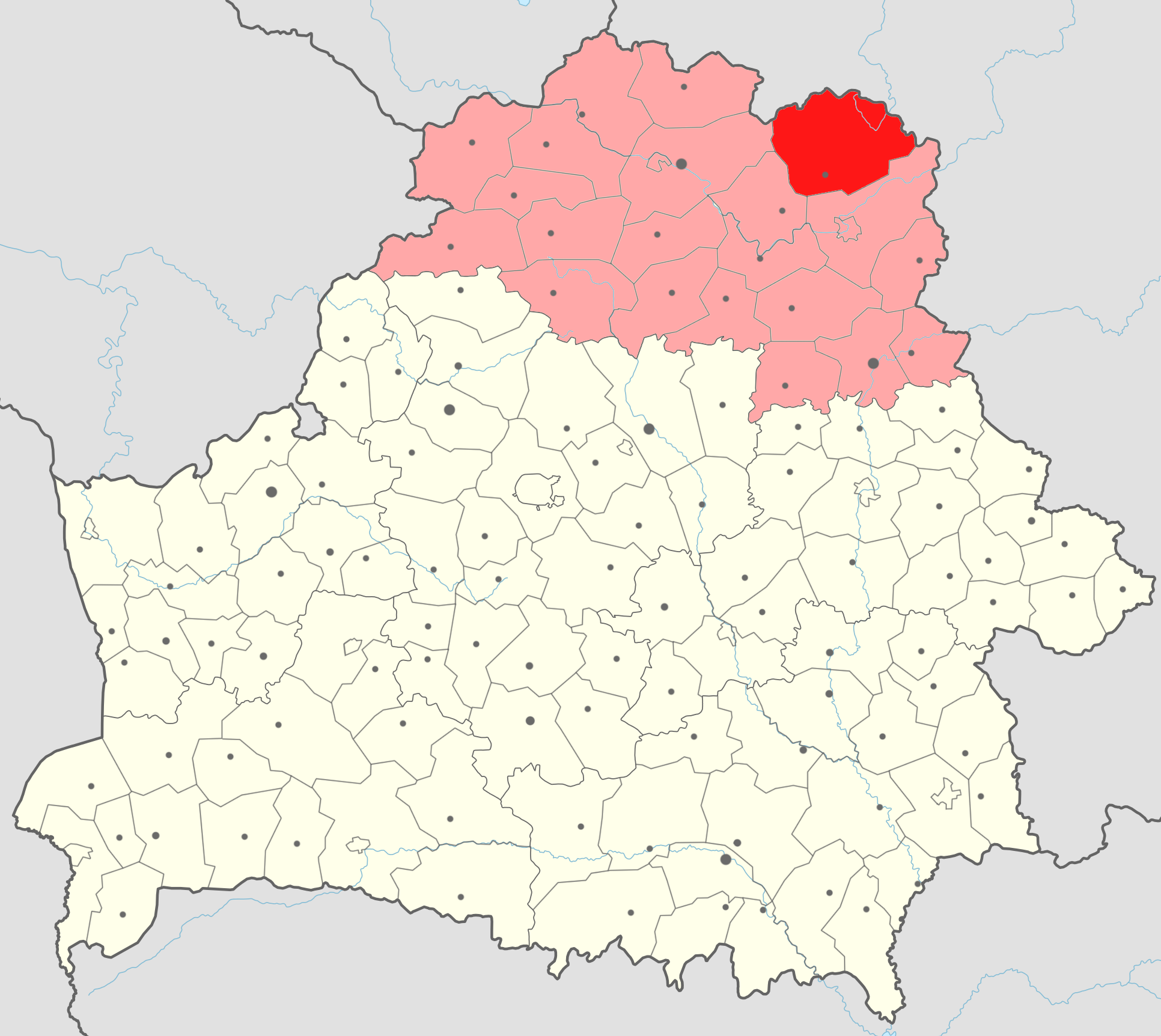
- Coordinates: 55°28′N 29°59′E
- Country: Belarus
- Region: Vitebsk region
- Administrative center: Haradok

Area
  - Total: 2,980.13 km^{2} (1,150.63 sq mi)
- Elevation: 193 m (633 ft)

Population (2023)
  - Total: 20,769
  - Density: 6.9692/km^{2} (18.050/sq mi)
- Time zone: UTC+3 (MSK)

Haradok district (Belarusian: Гарадоцкі раён; Russian: Городокский район) is a district (raion) of Vitebsk region in Belarus. Its administrative centre is Haradok.

The largest lakes of the district are Yezyaryscha Lake (the thirteenth largest in Belarus) and Losvida Lake (the eighteenth largest in Belarus).
