= Lake Yezyaryshcha =

- Возера Езярышча (Belarusian)
- Location within Belarus
- Location: Haradok District, Vitebsk Region, Belarus
- Coordinates: 55°51′N 30°01′E
- Type: Reservoir
- Surface area: 15.32 square metres (164.9 sq ft)
- Surface elevation: 161 metres (528 ft)

Lake Yezyaryshcha (Belarusian: возера Езярышча, romanized: vozera Jeziaryšča; Russian: озеро Езерище, romanized: ozero Yezerishche) is a lake in Haradok District, Vitebsk Region, Belarus. It is situated at the Belarus–Russia border, neighboring Pskov Oblast in Russia.

In 1959, on the river flowing out of the lake, a hydroelectric power plant was built. This led to the raising of the water level (as the lake began to function as a reservoir). Raising the water level leads to erosion of its banks. The lake is dated to the glacial period and is about 10,000 years old. The largest settlement on the bank of the lake is Yezyaryshcha (Yezerische), a settlement located on the western shore of the lake. Yezyaryshcha Castle is situated on one of the islands. In the present day, only ramparts of the castle are preserved.
