= 201st Security Division =

- 201. Sicherungs-Division
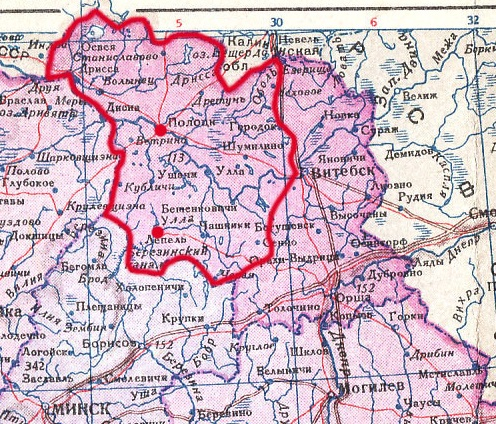
- Active: 1941–1944
- Country: Nazi Germany
- Branch: Army (Wehrmacht)
- Type: Security division
- Size: Division
- Engagements: World War II

The 201st Security Division, originally the 201st Security Brigade, was a German Army rear-area security division of World War II. The unit was deployed in German-occupied areas of the Soviet Union, and was responsible for large-scale war crimes and atrocities including the deaths of thousands of Soviet civilians. It was disbanded in January 1945

== Operational history ==
=== Formation ===
The division was formed in June 1942 on the basis of the 201st Security Brigade. The brigade had been deployed on the Eastern Front during Operation Barbarossa, the 1941 invasion of the Soviet Union, and operated in the occupied regions of the Soviet Union behind Army Group Centre's front lines. While a brigade the unit participated in the murder of Jewish civilians alongside Einsatzkommando 9 of Einsatzgruppe B.

=== Operations ===
Upon formation, the division operated in the Vitebsk-Polotsk region of the north-western Belarus. Its duties included security of communications and supply lines, economic exploitation and combatting (partisans) in the Wehrmacht's rear areas. The so-called anti-partisan operations in "bandit-infested" areas amounted to the destruction of villages, seizure of livestock, deportation of the able-bodied population for slave labour to Germany, and the murder of those of non-working age.

In September 1942 the division reported killing 864 "partisans in combat" and handed over 245 individuals to the Wehrmacht's Secret Field Police for execution, while suffering 8 dead and 25 wounded itself. Only 99 weapons (rifles, machine-guns and pistols) were seized. In early 1943, the division carried out operations Schneehase, Kugelblitz and Donnerkeil, which resulted in the death of 2,737 "bandits". In the same period, the unit reported 109 German troops killed in action.

The division was sent to front-line duty in February 1943. The unit was largely destroyed during the Soviet Red Army summer offensive Operation Bagration in 1944, with only the staff and supply troops retreating north. In August 1944, it returned to rear-area security operations and spent the rest of its existence in the rear area of the Army Group North. It was disbanded in January 1945.

== See also ==
- War crimes of the Wehrmacht
