= Haradok =

Town in Vitebsk Region, Belarus

Haradok: Гарадок (Belarusian); Городок (Russian)
- Town
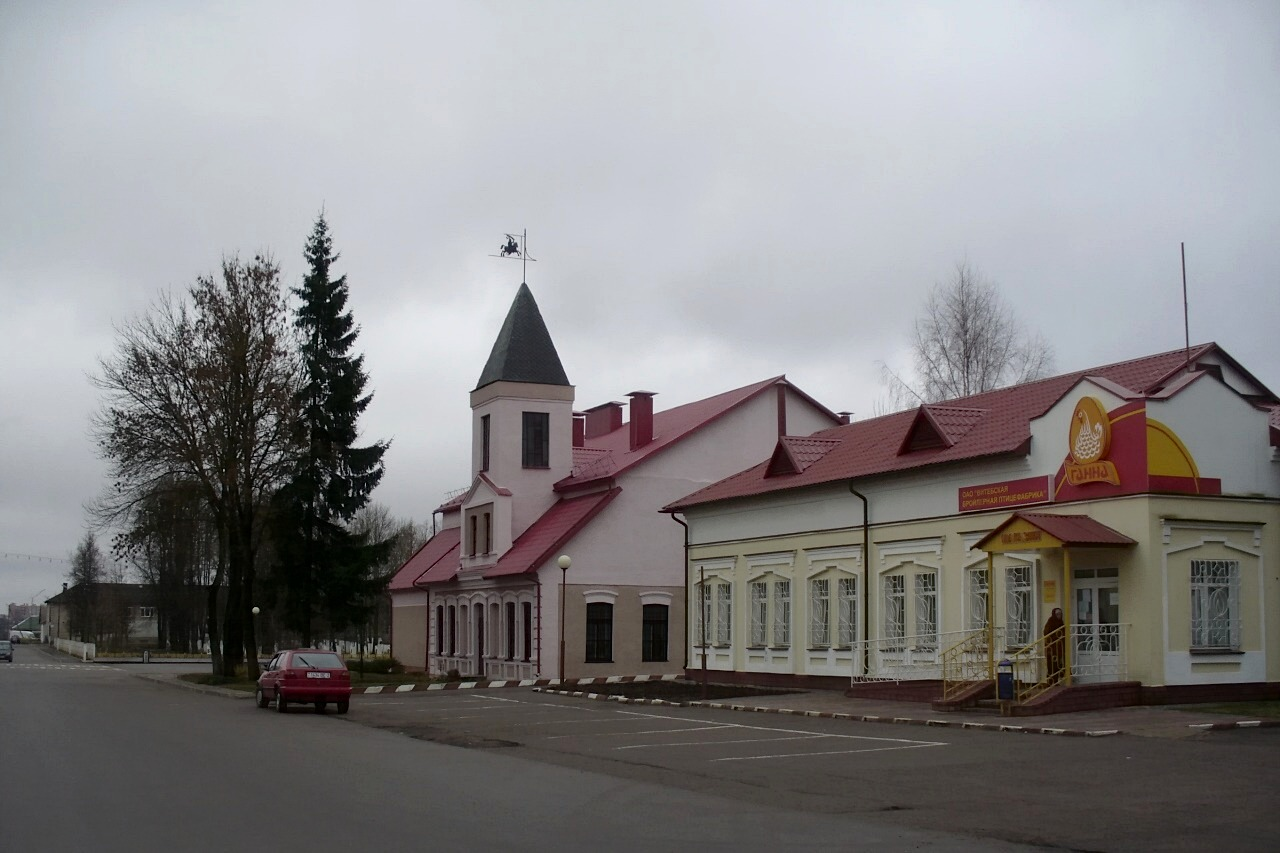

- Flag Coat of arms

- Location within Belarus
- Coordinates: 55°28′N 30°00′E
- Country: Belarus
- Region: Vitebsk Region
- District: Haradok District
- First mentioned: 13th century

Population (2025)
  - Total: 11,321
- Time zone: UTC+3 (MSK)
- Postal code: 211573
- Area code: +375 2139
- License plate: 2

Haradok or Gorodok (Belarusian: Гарадок, IPA: [ɣaraˈdok]; Russian: Городок; Polish: Horodek) is a town in Vitebsk Region, Belarus. It serves as the administrative center of Haradok District. Approximately 14,000 people reside in the town itself and around 30,000 people reside within the district, which is one of the largest in the country. The town is located on the north-east of Belarus and occupies around 3,000 square kilometers. It is situated 30 kilometers away from Vitebsk, the major city of one of the six provinces in the Republic of Belarus. As of 2025, it has a population of 11,321.

== History ==
Within the Grand Duchy of Lithuania, Haradok was part of Vitebsk Voivodeship. Haradok was acquired by the Russian Empire in 1772, in the course of the First Partition of Poland.

=== Holocaust ===
In 1939, 1,584 Jews lived in the town, making up 21.7% of the population.

During World War II, Haradok was under German occupation from 10 July 1941 until 24 December 1943. In the first half of August 1941, between 120 and 200 Jews were shot by the Germans near the village of Berezovka (1.5 kilometers south of the town). Shortly after this shooting, the Germans established a ghetto in a neighborhood in the center of town. It was fenced on three sides with barbed wire, and the river formed its boundary on the fourth side. Men were sometimes required to perform forced labor.

On October 14, 1941, the Gorodok ghetto was liquidated. Nearly 400 Jews were shot in the forest in the Vorobyevy Hills. They were killed in pits that had been dug in advance. Also, between August and October 1941, there were several small-scale shootings of Jews.
