= Rūdiškės =

- Town
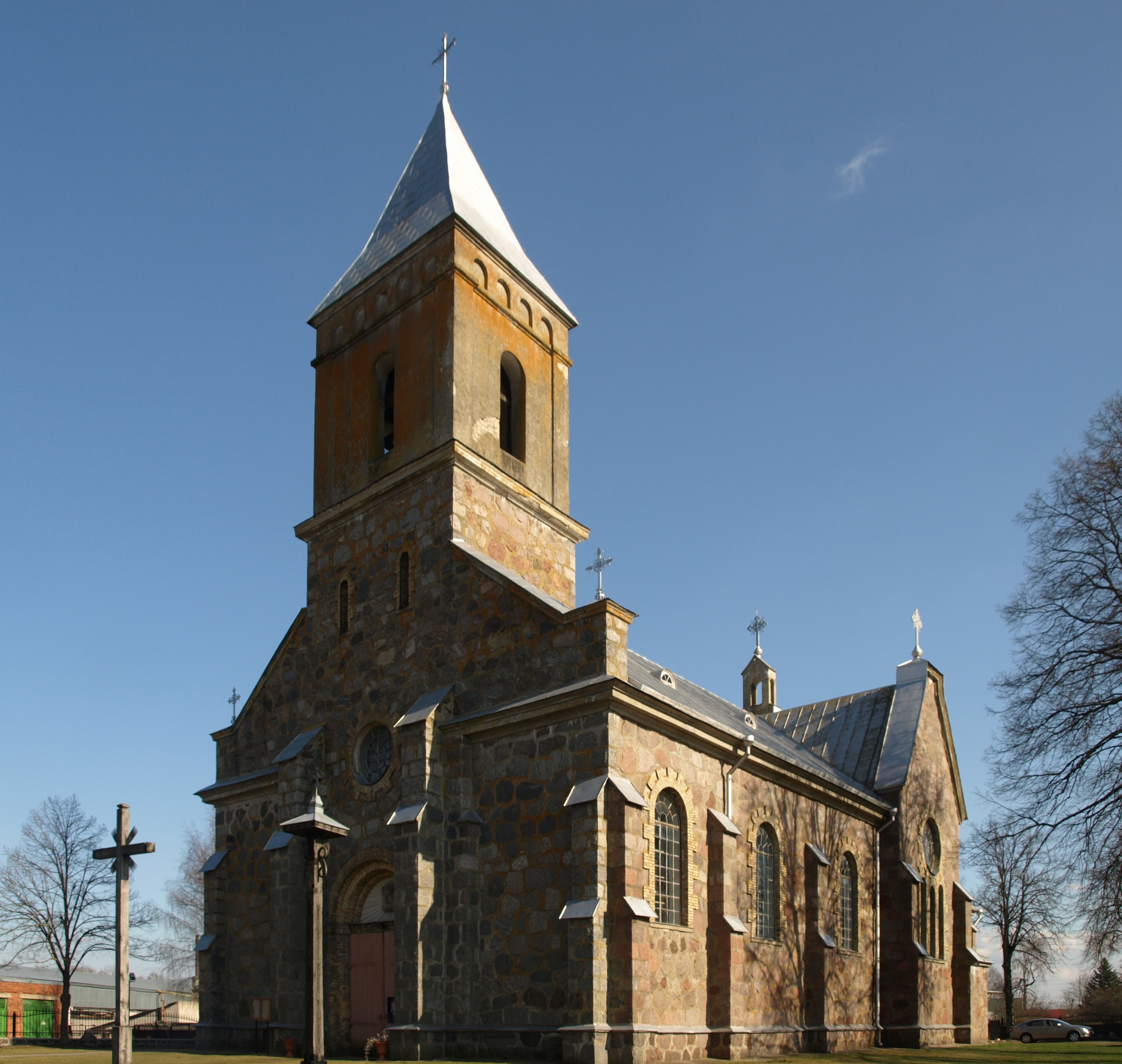
- Church of the Sacred Heart of Jesus

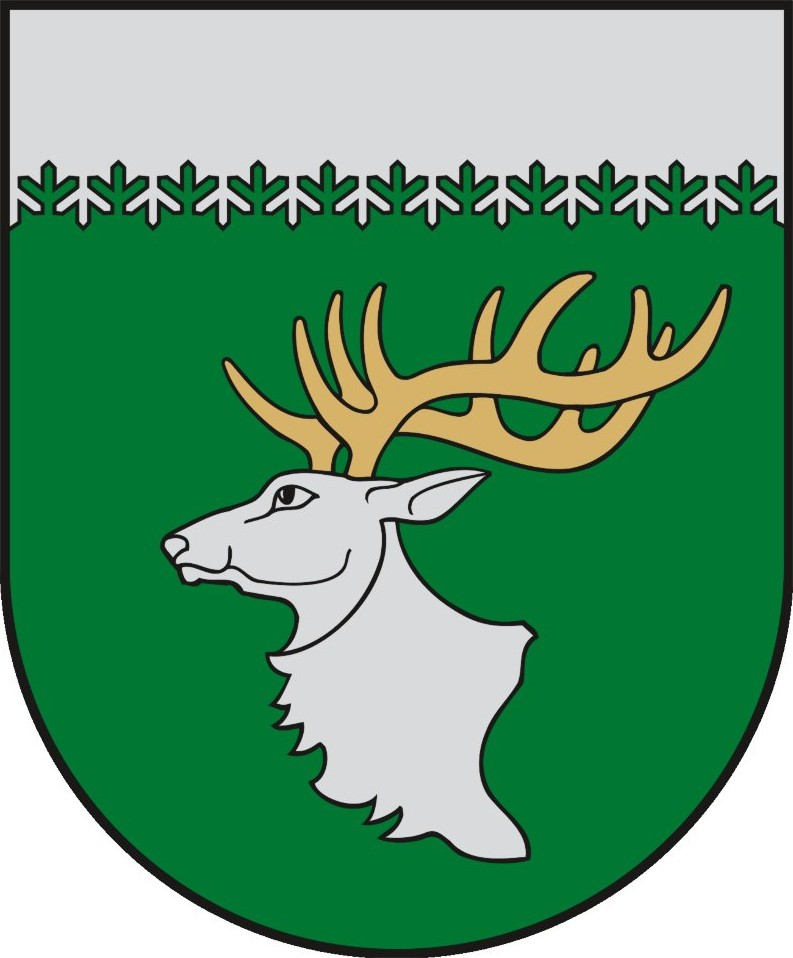
- Coat of arms

- Location of Rūdiškės
- Coordinates: 54°31′0″N 24°50′0″E
- Country: Lithuania
- Ethnographic region: Dzūkija
- County: Vilnius County
- Municipality: Trakai district municipality
- Eldership: Rūdiškės eldership
- Capital of: Rūdiškės eldership
- First mentioned: 1774
- Granted town rights: 1958

Population (2021)
  - Total: 1,962
- Time zone: UTC+2 (EET)
  - Summer (DST): UTC+3 (EEST)

Rūdiškės (Polish: Rudziszki; Belarusian: Рудзішкі) is a town in the Trakai district municipality, Lithuania about 15 km south of Trakai.

During the interwar period it was part of the Second Polish Republic.

Until 2003 FK Vėtra was based in Rūdiškės. In 2003 FK Vėtra won bronze medals in the elite division and reached LFF Cup finals and the same year it was relocated to Vilnius. Now the town has its FK Rūdiškės football club.

== Population ==
In 2011, the town had a population of 2300: Lithuanians - 50,83% (1169), Poles - 36,17% (832), Russians - 8,52% (196), Belarusians - 2,26% (52), Ukrainians - 0,7% (16), others - 1,52% (35).

== Sister cities ==
- Zalewo, Poland
