= II-71 road (Bulgaria) =

Road in Bulgaria

Republic Road I-71
- Републикански път I-71

Route information
- Length: 124.3 km (77.2 mi)

Major junctions
- From: Km 6.9 of I-7, near Silistra
- To: Km 74.3 of I-9, Obrochishte

Location
- Country: Bulgaria
- Towns: Silistra, Dobrich

Highway system
- Highways in Bulgaria

Republican Road II-71 (Bulgarian: Републикански път II-71) is a second-class road in northeastern Bulgaria, running through Silistra and Dobrich Provinces. Its length is 124.3 km.

== Route description ==
The road starts at Km 6.9 of the first class I-7 southeast of the city of Silistra and heads southeast through the region of Dobrudzha in the eastern Danubian Plain. It passes through the villages of Bogorovo and Sredishte and 4.4 km after the latter enters Dobrich Province. There the road runs through the villages of Kolartsi, Hitovo and Karapelit, turns east and reaches the northwestern outskirts of the city of Dobrich at Riltsi neighbourhood. As it bypasses the city from the southwest and the south it doubles for a few kilometers with the second class roads of II-27, II-29 and II-97. South of Dobrich the road heads in southern direction through Branishte, Stefanovo and Slaveevo, and at the village of Batovo descends to the deep valley of the river Batova. Following the river valley, the II-71 runs through the village of Tsarkva and reaches its terminus at Km 6.9 of the first class I-9 at the eastern outskirts of the village of Obrochishte on the Bulgarian Black Sea Coast.
