= Dobrichka reka =

Location
- Country: Bulgaria

Physical characteristics
- Source
  - location: S of Draganovo, Dobrudzha Plateau
  - coordinates: 43°27′6.12″N 27°47′26.16″E
  - elevation: 278 m (912 ft)
- Mouth
  - location: Suha reka
  - coordinates: 43°48′56.16″N 27°37′21″E
  - elevation: 87 m (285 ft)
- Length: 70 km (43 mi)

Basin features
- Progression: Suha reka → Danube

The Dobrichka reka (Bulgarian: Добричка река) is a river in northeastern Bulgaria, a right tributary of the Suha reka, itself a right tributary of the Danube. Its length is 70 km.

The Dobrichka reka takes its source from a spring at an altitude of 278 m in the Dobrudzha Plateau, south of the village of Draganovo in eastern part of the Danubian Plain. It flows north until the city of Dobrich, where it forms a large arc protruding to the east. Downstream of Dobrich the river turns northwest, its valley becomes canyon-like, deeply cut in the Aptian and Serravallian limestones of the Dobrudzha Plateau. In that section, especially after the village of Bozhurovo, the river dries up, with water flowing irregularly in spring. The river flows into the Suha reka at an altitude of 87 m, some 2 km southeast of the village of Efreytor Bakalovo.

The Dobrichka reka has rain–snow feed with low annual discharge and irregular water flow.

The river flows entirely in Dobrich Province. There are one city and nine villages along its course, Draganovo, Opanets, Bogdan, Dobrich (city), Vrachantsi, Rosenovo, Bozhurovo and Kamen in Dobrichka Municipality, as well as Lozenets and Severtsi in Krushari Municipality. Due to the low discharge there are several small reservoirs along the river and its tributaries to catch water for irrigation.
