= II-27 road (Bulgaria) =

Road in Bulgaria

Republic Road I-27
- Републикански път I-27

Route information
- Length: 112.2 km (69.7 mi)

Major junctions
- From: Km 137.9 of I-2, Novi Pazar
- To: Balchik

Location
- Country: Bulgaria
- Towns: Novi Pazar, Dobrich, Balchik

Highway system
- Highways in Bulgaria

Republican Road II-27 (Bulgarian: Републикански път II-27) is a second-class road in northeastern Bulgaria, running through Shumen, Varna and Dobrich Provinces. Its length is 112.2 km.

== Route description ==
The road starts at Km 137.9 of the first class I-2 road in the southeastern neighbourhoods of the town of Novi Pazar and heads north. After the village of Pamukchii it ascends the Stana Plateau and enters the easternmost area of the Ludogorie Plateau. It passes through the villages of Sechishte, Preselka and Tranitsa and enters Varna Province. There it runs through the villages of Izvornik, Stefan Karadzha and Cherventsi, reaches the Dobrudzha Plateau, enters Dobrich Province and turns east. The road goes through the villages of Bdintsi, Vladimirovo, Orlova mogila, Dolina and Odrintsi and reaches the southwestern section of the ring road of the city of Dobrich, the second class II-97 road, where it doubles for a few kilometers with the second class roads of II-29 and II-71 as it bypasses the city from south and southeast. At its Km 77.8 the road heads southeast, runs through the villages of Primortsi, Senokos and Sokolovo, and reaches its terminus at the port of the Black Sea town of Balchik.
