= Suha reka (river) =

Location
- Country: Bulgaria; Romania

Physical characteristics
- Source
  - location: Frangen Plateau
  - coordinates: 43°16′59.88″N 27°41′53.16″E
  - elevation: 333 m (1,093 ft)
- Mouth
  - location: Danube
  - coordinates: 44°8′9.96″N 27°37′23.88″E
  - elevation: 7 m (23 ft)
- Length: 126 km (78 mi)
- Basin size: 2,404 km^{2} (928 sq mi)

Basin features
- Progression: Lake Oltina→ Danube→ Black Sea

The Suha reka (Bulgarian: Суха река, meaning “Dry River”) is a river in northeastern Bulgaria and southeastern Romania, a right tributary of the Danube. The river flows in the region of Dobruja. Its length is 126 km, of which over 100 km are in Bulgaria. In Romania, where it is called Canaraua Fetei, it flows through the lakes Iortmac and Oltina.

== Geography ==
The Suha reka takes its source under the name Izvorsko dere from a spring at an altitude of 333 m in the western part of the Frangen Plateau, about a kilometer south of the village of Izgrev in eastern part of the Danubian Plain. It flows north in a wide valley of developed in Barremian, Aptian and Serravallian calcareous limestones. After taking its tributary the Karamandere, its valley becomes canyon-like with steep slopes, at places over 100 m high. North of the village of Karapelit the river bed dries up remains dry until its mouth. At 4 km north of the village of Kranovo the Suha reka enters Romania and flows into the southwestern part of Lake Oltina on the right bank of the Danube.

Its drainage basin covers a territory of 2,404 km^{2} or 0.3% of the Danube's total. The river system is asymmetric, with short left tributaries with larger slope and long right tributaries with well developed valleys. The largest tributaries are the Karamandere (66 km) and the Dobrichka reka (70 km).

The Suha reka has rain–snow feed with high water in March–June and low water in July–October. Its water flow is not constant. The average annual discharge at the village of Novo Botevo is 0.69 m^{3}/s. The river freezes in winter for 10–20 days.

The Suha reka used to have a constant water flow but deforestation in its catchment area led to almost complete drying up of its middle and lower reaches. Currently the river has a permanent runoff only in the upper course to the village of Karapelit, while further downstream water flow is irregular. In these sections the river bed is dry, reaching at places a width of up to 500 m, with steep rocky shores, occupied by arable land. The hydrometric station at Novo Botevo records year-round runoff; 35 km downstream at Karapelit, the runoff is only 2–3 months in the spring; at the village of Efreytor Bakalovo, located another 30 km downstream, the runoff is erratic, only during heavy snowmelt or torrential rains. In some places there are forests of Austrian oak (Quercus cerris), pubescent oak (Quercus pubescens), penduculate oak (Quercus robur), Oriental hornbeam (Carpinus orientalis), South European flowering ash (Fraxinus ornus), etc.

== Settlements and economy ==
The river flows in Varna, Dobrich and Silistra Provinces. There are seven villages along its course, Zornitsa and Botevo in Aksakovo Municipality, Varna Province; Novo Botevo, Odrintsi, Dolina and Karapelit in Dobrichka Municipality, Dobrich Province; and Kranovo in Kaynardzha Municipality, Silistra Province. In lower course, the Stara reka serves as boundary between the municipalities of Tervel and Krushari, and further downstream, as the regional border between the provinces of Dobrich and Silistra. Its waters in the upper and middle course are utilized for irrigation.

After receiving its right tributary the Dobrichka reka, the Suha reka enters a deep canyon, the steep and steep rocky banks, in which in the Middle Ages during the First and Second Bulgarian Empires hundreds of caves were carved to house hermit monks. In addition, there are many natural caves sheltering a number of bird species, making Stara reka one of the ornithologically important sites in Bulgaria. The river is among the prime butterfly areas of Bulgaria, where several species of conservational importance are found, including Parnassius mnemosyne, Lycaena dispar, Euphydryas maturna, Melitaea trivia and Brenthis hecate.
