= Batova =

Batova reka
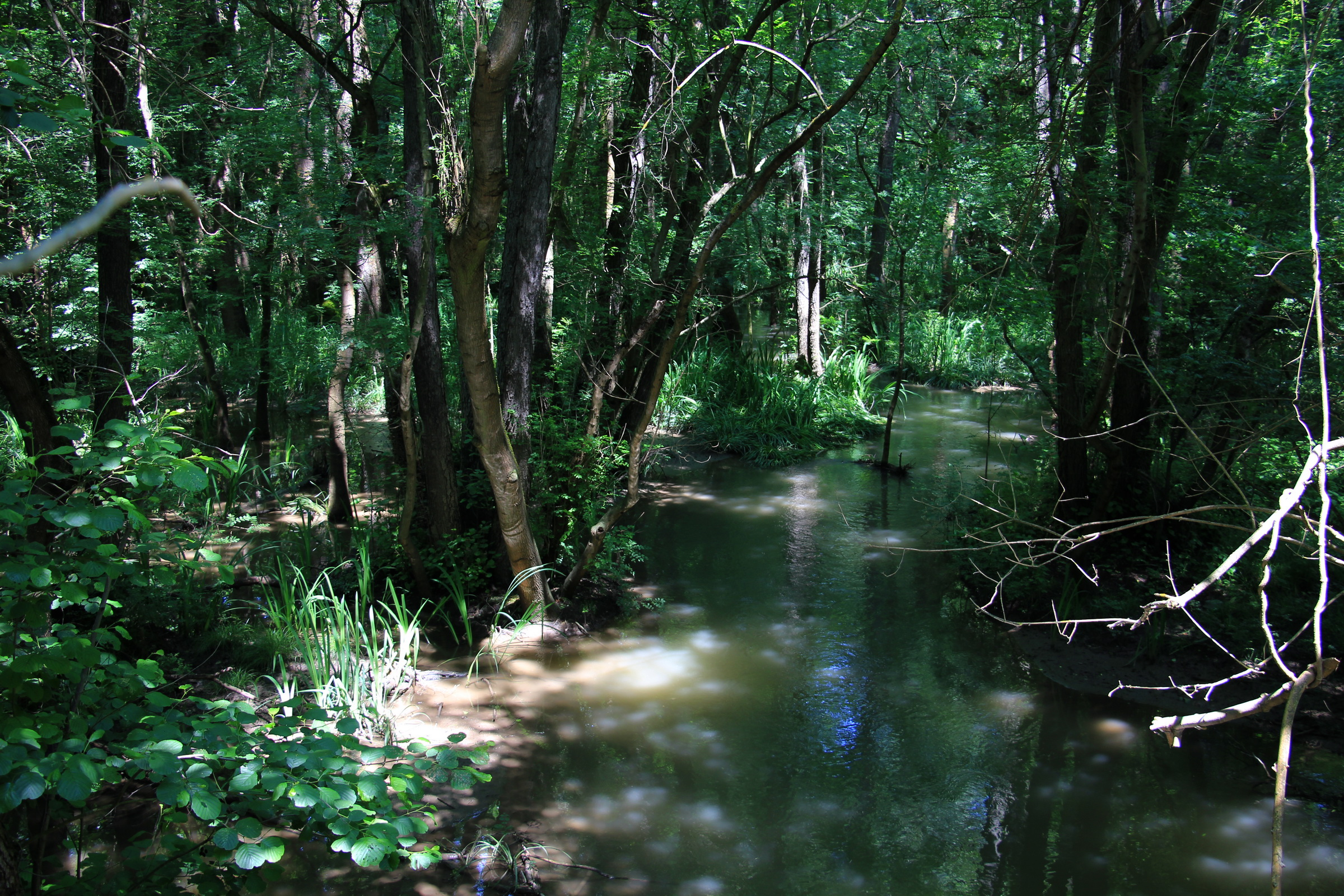

Location
- Country: Bulgaria

Physical characteristics
- Source
  - location: Frangen Plateau
  - coordinates: 43°18′37.08″N 27°46′28.2″E
  - elevation: 309 m (1,014 ft)
- Mouth
  - location: Black Sea
  - coordinates: 42°20′45.96″N 28°4′19.92″E
  - elevation: 0 m (0 ft)
- Length: 39 km (24 mi)
- Basin size: 339 km^{2} (131 sq mi)

The Batova reka (Bulgarian: Батова река) is a 39 km long river in northeastern Bulgaria.

The river takes its source under the name Kavakdere from a karst spring at an altitude of 309 m in the Frangen Plateau some 1.2 km southwest of the village of Kumanovo. Throughout its whole course the Batova reka flows in a canyon-like valley with forest slopes prone to landslides. It flows north until the village of Dolishte, after which it turns east, forming a large arc bulging northwards to bypass the Frangen Plateau. Turning southeast, it flows into the Black Sea at the village of Kranevo. It its mouth is located the Baltata Reserve, which protects the northernmost coastal riverine forest in Bulgaria, while south of it lies Golden Sands Nature Park. Just north of Baltata is the important seaside resort of Albena. The Batova reka is the only river in Southern Dobrudzha with a permanent year-round water flow.

Its drainage basin covers a territory of 339 km^{2}. The river has predominantly rain feed with high water in February and low water in July–August. The average annual flow near the village of Obrochishte is 0.73 m^{3}/s. Its water flow is constant throughout the year due to the significant discharge of the karst springs at its source.

The Batova reka flows in Varna and Dobrich Provinces. There are five villages along its course, Dolishte in Aksakovo Municipality of Varna Province, and Batovo in Dobrichka Municipality, Tsarkva, Obrochishte and Kranevo in Balchik Municipality of Dobrich Province. Its waters are utilised for irrigation. There two roads along its valley, a 5.1 km stretch of the first class I-9 road Durankulak–Varna–Burgas–Malko Tarnovo follows the Batova reka between Obrochishte and Kranevo, and a 9.5 km stretch of the second class II-71 road Silistra–Dobrich–Obrochishte follows the valley between Batovo and Obrochishte.
