= Karamandere (river) =

Location
- Country: Bulgaria

Physical characteristics
- Source
  - location: Stana Plateau
  - coordinates: 43°28′5.88″N 27°12′20.16″E
  - elevation: 409 m (1,342 ft)
- Mouth
  - location: Suha reka
  - coordinates: 43°37′5.88″N 27°36′15.12″E
  - elevation: 144 m (472 ft)
- Length: 66 km (41 mi)
- Basin size: 629 km^{2} (243 sq mi)

Basin features
- Progression: Suha reka → Danube

The Karamandere (Bulgarian: Карамандере) is a river in northeastern Bulgaria, a left tributary of the Suha reka, itself a right tributary of the Danube. Its length is 66 km.

== Course ==
The Karamandere takes its source under the name Dumandere at an altitude of 409 m in the northwestern part of the Stana Plateau, some 2.5 km northwest of the village of Mirovtsi in eastern part of the Danubian Plain. It flows east until the village of Strahil, where it turns north. Downstream of the crossing with the second class II-27 road Novi Pazar–Dobrich the river dries up in summer. The Karamandere flows in a wide valley throughout the whole course. It flows into the Suha reka at an altitude of 144 m some 3.8 km southeast of the village of Karapelit.

Its drainage basin covers a territory of 629 km^{2} or 26.2% of the Suha reka's total. It is primarily fed by karst spring waters. The river has rain–snow feed with low annual discharge and irregular water flow.

The Karamandere flows in Shumen, Varna and Dobrich Provinces. There are four villages along its course, Enenitsa, Metlichina, Brestak and Strahil, all of them in Valchi Dol Municipality of Varna Province. Due to the low discharge there are several small reservoirs along the river and its tributaries to catch water for irrigation.
