= II-29 road (Bulgaria) =

Road in Bulgaria

Republic Road I-29
- Републикански път I-29

Route information
- Length: 82.3 km (51.1 mi)

Major junctions
- From: Km 198 of I-2, Varna
- To: Yovkovo at the Bulgaria–Romania border; DN38 in Romania

Location
- Country: Bulgaria
- Towns: Varna, Dobrich, General Toshevo

Highway system
- Highways in Bulgaria

Republican Road II-29 (Bulgarian: Републикански път II-29) is a second-class road in northeastern Bulgaria, running through Varna and Dobrich Provinces. Its length is 82.3 km.

== Route description ==
The road starts at Km 198 of the first class I-2 road in the western neighbourhoods of the Black Sea port city of Varna and heads north along Atanas Moskov Street. In 0.9 km it turns west along Tsar Osvoboditel Boulevard and in 2.6 km at Km 415.5 of the Hemus motorway the road heads in northwestern direction. It passes through the eastern parts of the town of Aksakovo and the village of Izvorsko, turns north and enters the Dobrudzha plateau of the Danubian Plain, reaching Dobrich Province in 15 km. It runs through the village of Stozher, reaches the ring road of the city of Dobrich, the second class II-97 road, and bypasses the city from southeast and east. Northeast of Dobrich the road heads in northeastern direction, passes through the village of Stefan Karadzha, the town of General Toshevo and the village of Kardam, bypasses the village of Yovkovo and reaches the Bulgaria–Romania border, where it continues as DN38 of the Romanian road network.
