= Batovo =

Batovo may refer to:

- Batovo, Bulgaria, a village in the municipality of Dobrichka in Dobrich Province, Bulgaria
- Batovo, Ukraine, a rural settlement in Berehove Raion, Zakarpattia Oblast, Ukraine
- Batovo, Vologda Oblast, a village in Vologda Oblast, Russia
