= Dobrujan Germans =

German ethnic group

German: Dobruschadeutsche
- The historical coat of arms of the Dobrujan Germans (which is a form of the coat of arms of the Romanian Dobruja or Northern Dobruja)

Regions with significant populations
- Northern Dobruja

Languages
- German

Religion
- Roman Catholicism and Lutheranism

Related ethnic groups
- Germans and Austrians
- Lived in Dobruja (mostly Northern Dobruja) between the late 19th century and mid 20th century (and, in very smaller numbers, to the present day as well)

The Dobrujan Germans (German: Dobrudschadeutsche) were an ethnic German group, within the larger category of Black Sea Germans, for over one hundred years. German-speaking colonists entered the approximately 23,000 km^{2} area of Dobruja around 1840 and mostly left during the relocation of 1940. Dobruja is a historical region on the west coast of the Black Sea. They are part of the Romanian Germans and Bulgarian Germans.

== Colonization ==
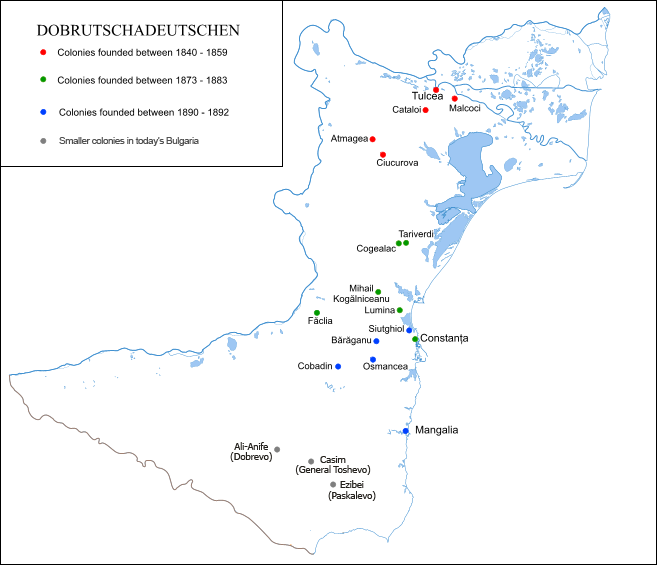
German colonies in Dobruja

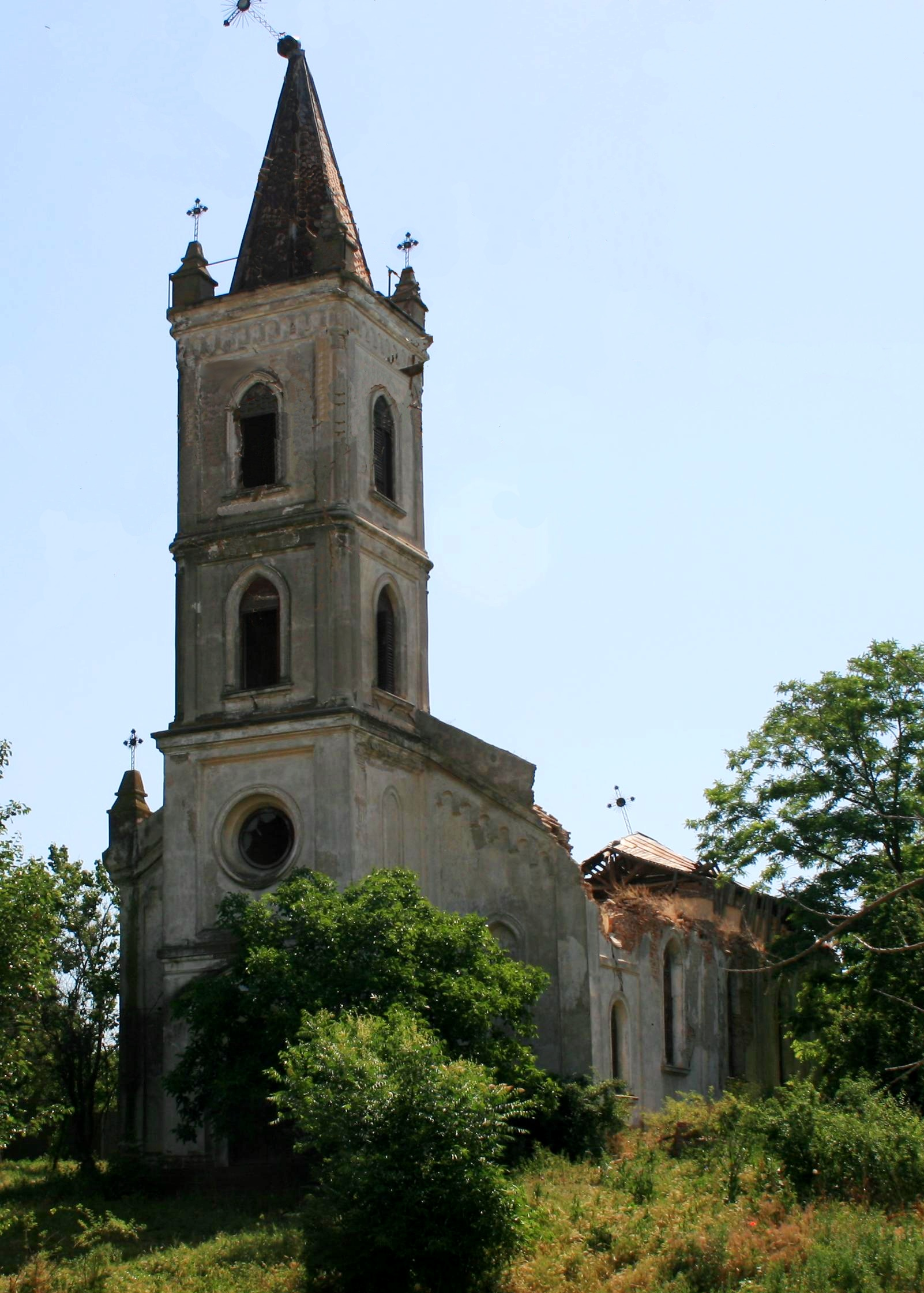
Ruins of the Dobrujan German Catholic church in Malcoci, Nufăru

The first of these German settlers came between 1841 and 1856 from the Russian Empire. They were farming families from the neighboring areas of Bessarabia and Cherson, who immigrated because of an economic recession in their home territories. Thirty years later, colonists from Swabia also moved into the region. During this period, Dobruja still belonged to the Ottoman Empire and the colonists were subject to colonization regulations from Turkey. Consequently, the Dobrujan Germans were the only ethnic Germans to ever be Turkish subjects without actually moving to Turkey (as did the Bosporus Germans). They contributed to the agricultural development of the fertile steppes.

== In Bulgaria ==
While most Dobrujan Germans inhabited Northern Dobruja (modern Romania), some settled in Southern Dobruja (modern Bulgaria, but part of Romania between 1913 and 1940). The most significant Dobrujan German colony in Bulgaria was founded in Dobrevo (Ali Anife Kalfa) in 1903 by German Roman Catholics from the Crimea and Kherson. The colonists numbered around 150 in 1909 and built a stone church in 1911. The village was briefly renamed to Germantsi ("Germans") in honour of the colonists once it was returned to Bulgarian control in 1940. 325 Germans left Ali Anife Kalfa to relocate to Germany in 1943.

Other historical Dobrujan German colonies in Bulgaria included Stozher (Baladscha, 15 families), Snyagovo (Hasarlik, 20 Baptist and Evangelical families), Izvorovo (Musubei, 20 Evangelical families), Orlova mogila (Serdimen, 10 Evangelical families) and the towns of General Toshevo (Tschobankuius, 220 Evangelical people) and Dobrich (Basardschik, 143 people).

== Relocation ==
In the first years of World War II, the majority of the 16,000 Dobrujan Germans, as well as the Bessarabia and Bukovina Germans, were relocated into Germany. This was done under the motto: Heim ins Reich (Home into the Empire). The refugees lived temporarily in relocation camps in Austria, but in 1941/1942 they resettled the German occupied eastern territories in Bohemia, Moravia, and Poland. At the end of the war, they fled west, and were found as refugees in all four occupation zones in Germany.

== See also ==
- Dobrujan Bulgarians
- Volksdeutsche
