= Tsarevets =

Tsarevets may refer to the following places in Bulgaria:

== Places ==
- Tsarevets, Dobrich Province
- Tsarevets, Kardzhali Province
- Tsarevets, Veliko Tarnovo Province
- Tsarevets, Vratsa Province

== Other ==
- Tsarevets (fortress)
