= Pchelnik =

Pchelnik may refer to:

- Darya Pchelnik (born 1981), Belarusian hammer thrower
- Pchelnik, Dobrich Province, a village in Dobrichka Municipality of Dobrich Province, Bulgaria
- Pchelnik, Varna Province, a village in Dolni Chiflik Municipality of Varna Province, Bulgaria
- Pchelnik, Russia, several rural localities in Russia
