= Samuilovo =

Samuilovo may refer to the following places in Bulgaria:

- Samuilovo, Blagoevgrad Province
- Samuilovo, Dobrich Province
