= Paskalevo =

Paskalevo Паскалево
- Village
- Location within Bulgaria
- Coordinates: 43°38′N 27°50′E
- Country: Bulgaria
- Province: Dobrich Province
- Municipality: Dobrichka
- Time zone: UTC+2 (EET)
  - Summer (DST): UTC+3 (EEST)

Paskalevo (Bulgarian: Паскалево) is a village in the municipality of Dobrichka, in Dobrich Province, in northeastern Bulgaria.

Formerly, the village was known as Ezi bey (Ези бей) and in Romanian as Ezibei, because it was founded as the chiflik of a 16th-century local Ottoman chieftain (bey) named Ezi. Ethnic Bulgarians settled in the early 19th century, with a further group of settlers brought in by priest Paskal in 1848. These Bulgarians originated from the Sliven and Yambol regions, though they had briefly emigrated to Bessarabia to escape Ottoman persecution after the Russo-Turkish War of 1828–29.

Between 1918 and 1940, the village was part of Caliacra County of the Kingdom of Romania, returning to Bulgarian control with the Treaty of Craiova. It was renamed to Paskalevo in honour of priest Paskal in 1942.
