= Smolnitsa =

Smolnitsa may refer to:

- Smolnitsa, Bulgaria, a village in Dobrich Province, northeastern Bulgaria
- Smolnitsa, Estonia, a village in Ida-Viru County, northeastern Estonia
