= Benkovski =

Benkovski may refer to:

== Places in Bulgaria ==
- Benkovski, Dobrich Province, a village in Dobrichka Municipality
- Benkovski, Kardzhali Province, village in Kardzhali Province
- Benkovski, Varna Province, a village in the Avren Municipality
- Benkovski, Sofia Province, a village
- Georgi Benkovski Stadium, a multi-use stadium in Pazardzhik

== People ==
- Georgi Benkovski (1843 – 1876), Bulgarian revolutionary

== Other ==
- Benkovski Nunatak, a rocky peak of elevation 450 m projecting from the ice cap of Greenwich Island, South Shetland Islands
- FC Benkovski Byala, a football club based in Byala, Bulgaria
