= Prilep (disambiguation) =

Prilep is a city in North Macedonia.

Prilep (Cyrillic: Прилеп) may also refer to:

- Lordship of Prilep, a successor-state of the Serbian Empire
- Prilep, Burgas Province, a village in the Burgas Province, Bulgaria
- Prilep, Dobrich Province, a village in the Dobrich Province, Bulgaria
- Prilep, Kosovo, a village in Kosovo
- Prilep Knoll, a hill in Graham Land, Antarctica
- Prilep Municipality, North Macedonia
