= Ovcharovo =

Ovcharovo may refer to:

- In Bulgaria (written in Cyrillic as Овчарово):
  - Ovcharovo, Dobrich Province - a village in Dobritchka municipality, Dobrich Province
  - Ovcharovo, Haskovo Province - a village in Harmanli municipality, Haskovo Province
  - Ovcharovo, Shumen Province - a village in Shumen municipality, Shumen Province
  - Ovcharovo, Targovishte Province - a village in Targovishte municipality, Targovishte Province
