= Zlatia, Dobrich Province =

Zlatia
- Village
- Location in Bulgaria
- Coordinates: 43.584°N 27.686°E
- Country: Bulgaria
- Province: Dobrich Province
- Municipality: Dobrichka
- Time zone: UTC+2 (EET)
  - Summer (DST): UTC+3 (EEST)

Zlatia is a village in the municipality of Dobrichka, in Dobrich Province, in northeastern Bulgaria.

== Honours ==
Zlatiya Glacier on Brabant Island, Antarctica is named after the village.

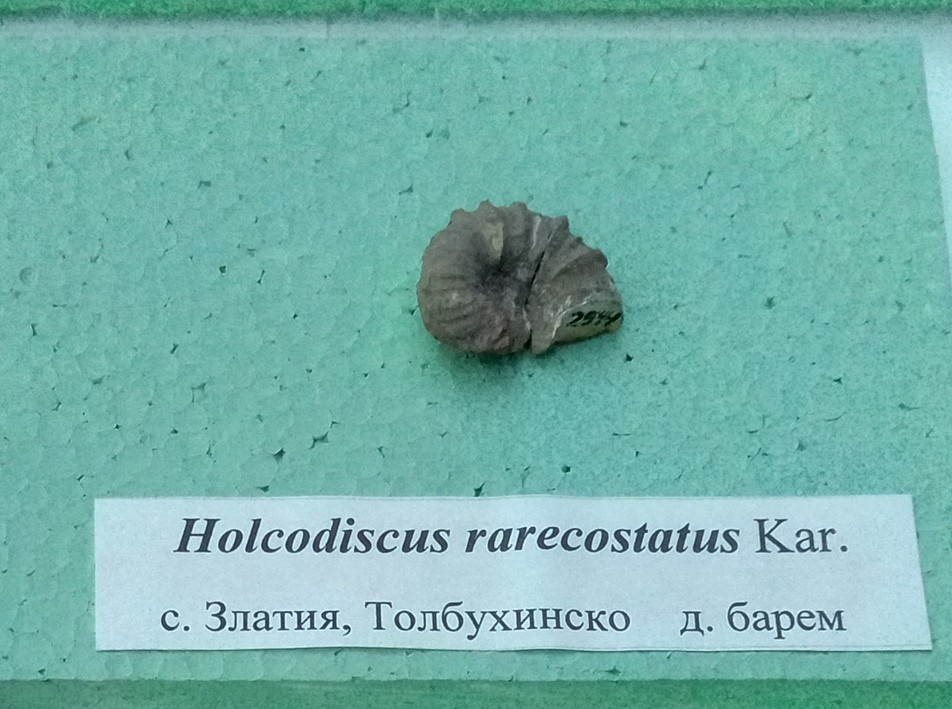
An ammonite Holcodiscus rarecostatus Karakasch, Lower Barremian, found in Zlatia, Dobrich Province on display at the Sofia University Museum of Paleontology and Historical Geology
