= II-97 road (Bulgaria) =

Road in Bulgaria

Republic Road I-97
- Републикански път I-97

Route information
- Length: 23.7 km (14.7 mi)

Major junctions
- From: Riltsi neightbourhood, Dobrich
- To: Riltsi neightbourhood, Dobrich

Location
- Country: Bulgaria

Highway system
- Highways in Bulgaria

Republican Road II-97 (Bulgarian: Републикански път II-97) is a 2nd class road in northeastern Bulgaria, running entirely through the territory of Dobrich Province. Its length is 23.7 km and serves as a ring road of the city of Dobrich.

The road starts in the southeastern part of Riltsi neighbourhood of Dobrich and runs in northern direction for 2.1 km, then turns east and after 5.8 km reaches an area northeast of the city, where the second class II-29 road branches off to the left. From there, it turns south, and after the junction with the second class II-27 road leading to Balchik on the Bulgarian Black Sea Coast, it continues in direction southwest and west. After reaching again the II-29 road running from Varna, this time from the south, the II-97 turns northwest and north, meets again the II-27 road coming from Novi Pazar and reaches its starting point at Riltsi neighbourhood.
