= General Kolevo, Dobrich Province =

General Kolevo
- Village
- Location in Bulgaria
- Coordinates: 43°38′55″N 27°56′35″E
- Country: Bulgaria
- Province: Dobrich Province
- Municipality: Dobrichka
- Time zone: UTC+2 (EET)
  - Summer (DST): UTC+3 (EEST)

General Kolevo (Bulgarian: Генерал Колево [ɡɛnɛˈraɫ ˈkɔlevo]) is a village in the municipality of Dobrichka, in Dobrich Province, in northeastern Bulgaria. It was formerly known as Chair Harman (Чаир харман [t͡ʃɐˈir xɐrˈman]).
