= Polkovnik Sveshtarovo =

- Village
- Location within Bulgaria
- Coordinates: 43°33′N 27°56′E
- Country: Bulgaria
- Province: Dobrich Province
- Municipality: Dobrichka
- Time zone: UTC+2 (EET)
  - Summer (DST): UTC+3 (EEST)

Polkovnik Sveshtarovo is a village in the municipality of Dobrichka, in Dobrich Province, in northeastern Bulgaria.
