= Kamen Bryag =

Kamen Bryag Камен Бряг
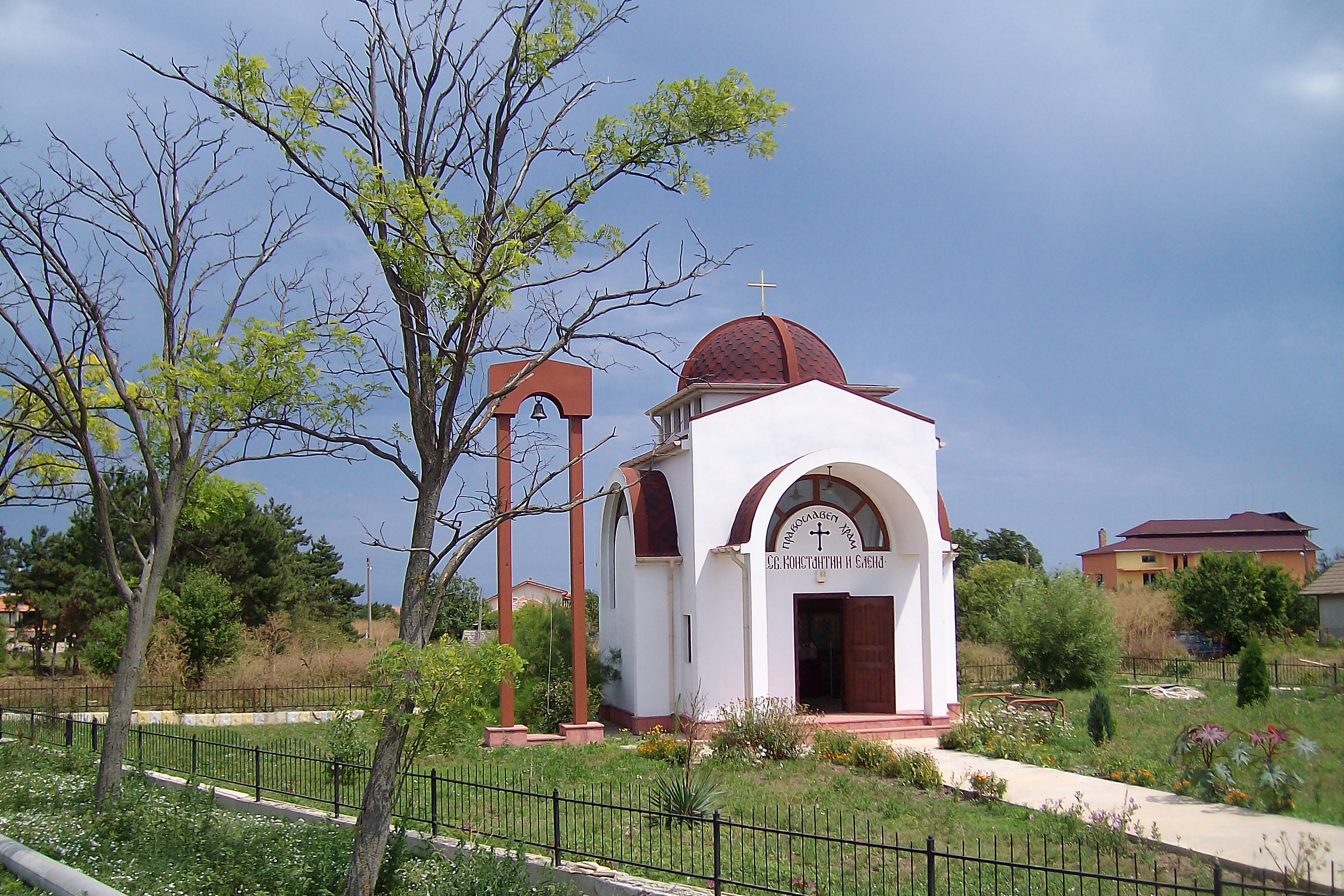
- Saints Constantine and Helena Christian Orthodox Chapel in Kamen Bryag

- Location of Kamen Bryag
- Coordinates: 43°27′18″N 028°33′02″E
- Country: Bulgaria
- Province: Dobrich Province
- Municipality: Kavarna

Government
  - Mayor: Tsonko Tsonev
  - Deputy Mayor: Dobrinka Yalnazova
- Elevation: 38 m (125 ft)

Population (2010)
  - Total: 69
- Time zone: UTC+2 (ЕЕТ)
  - Summer (DST): UTC+3 (ЕЕSТ)
- Post code: 9661
- Phone code: +359 5744

Kamen Bryag is a village in northeastern Bulgaria.

It is located in Kavarna Municipality, Dobrich Province, on the Black Sea coast. The population was 76 in 2009.

Yailata National Archaeological Reserve is located two kilometers south of the village.

== History ==
Old names of the village:

Kamennik - medieval, not sufficiently confirmed.

Kaya Bey Kyo - by the Ottoman authorities - literally translated "The Village of the Stone Lord". The name of the village originates from the lone rock in front of the Little Egg on the seashore in front of the village, symbolizing its location, as well as in general the rocky coast about kilometers high, not less than 30 meters high. In the area is also the Yailata locality, which is a huge stone formation.

Stânca - during the Romanian rule of 1919–1940.

== Population ==
The population of the village consists entirely of ethnic Bulgarians, descendants of settlers from the Balkan Mountains (Kotel and Elena regions) and Southern Romania. A compact group of ethnic Bulgarians, who previously inhabited Northern Dobruja, settled in Kamen Bryag as a result of the Treaty of Craiova. As of the 2000s, the village is a popular summer holiday destination.

=== Cultural and natural sights ===
2 km south of the village is the archeological site "Yailata" with numerous tombs, stone dwellings and an early Byzantine fortress wall. To the northwest of the village is a large necropolis of Scythian tombs. At the entrance of Yailata, a Thracian altar of the sun is discovered and cleared. There are a number of megalithic monuments along the high coasts north and south of the village.

On July 25, 2007, an information center was opened in the village providing information about the Yailata archeological reserve and other tourist sites in the region.

About 1.5 km from Yailata is the Lamb, a gas field from the late 1950s that has been burning to this day.

== Image gallery ==
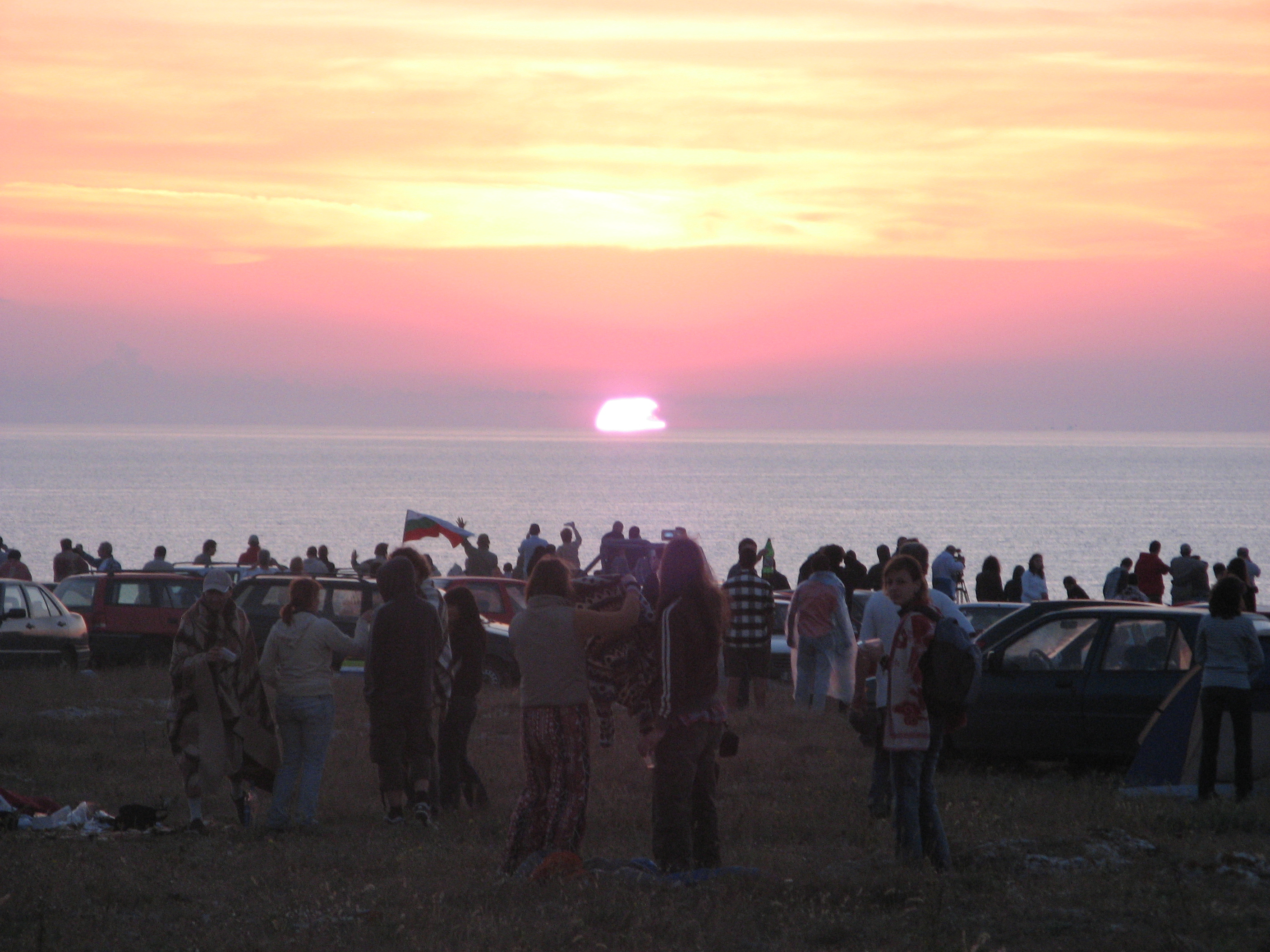
July Morning 2007 at Kamen Bryag with ex-Uriah Heep's John Lawton
