= Podslon, Dobrich Province =

Podslon
- Village
- Location in Bulgaria
- Coordinates: 43.676°N 27.512°E
- Country: Bulgaria
- Province: Dobrich Province
- Municipality: Dobrichka
- Time zone: UTC+2 (EET)
  - Summer (DST): UTC+3 (EEST)

Podslon (Bulgarian: Подслон [potˈsɫɔn]) is a village in the municipality of Dobrichka, in Dobrich Province, in northeastern Bulgaria. It was formerly known as Kuydzhuk (Куйджук [kujˈd͡ʒuk]).
