= Dryanovets, Dobrich Province =

Dryanovets
- Village
- Location in Bulgaria
- Coordinates: 43.717°N 27.556°E
- Country: Bulgaria
- Province: Dobrich Province
- Municipality: Dobrichka

Population (2020)
  - Total: 19
- Time zone: UTC+2 (EET)
  - Summer (DST): UTC+3 (EEST)

Dryanovets is a village in the municipality of Dobrichka, in Dobrich Province, in northeastern Bulgaria.

== Population ==
According to the Bulgarian Census of 2001, the village of Dryanovets was the village with the largest share of Roma people in its population: 90.2% of the population was ethically Rom, or 46 people (out of 51 people). While the population of Dryanovets declined to 21 people in the 2011 Census, the percentage of Roma grew to 95% (20 out of 21 inhabitants). According to 2020 estimates, the village had 19 people.
