= Caliacra County =

Județul Caliacra
- County (Județ)
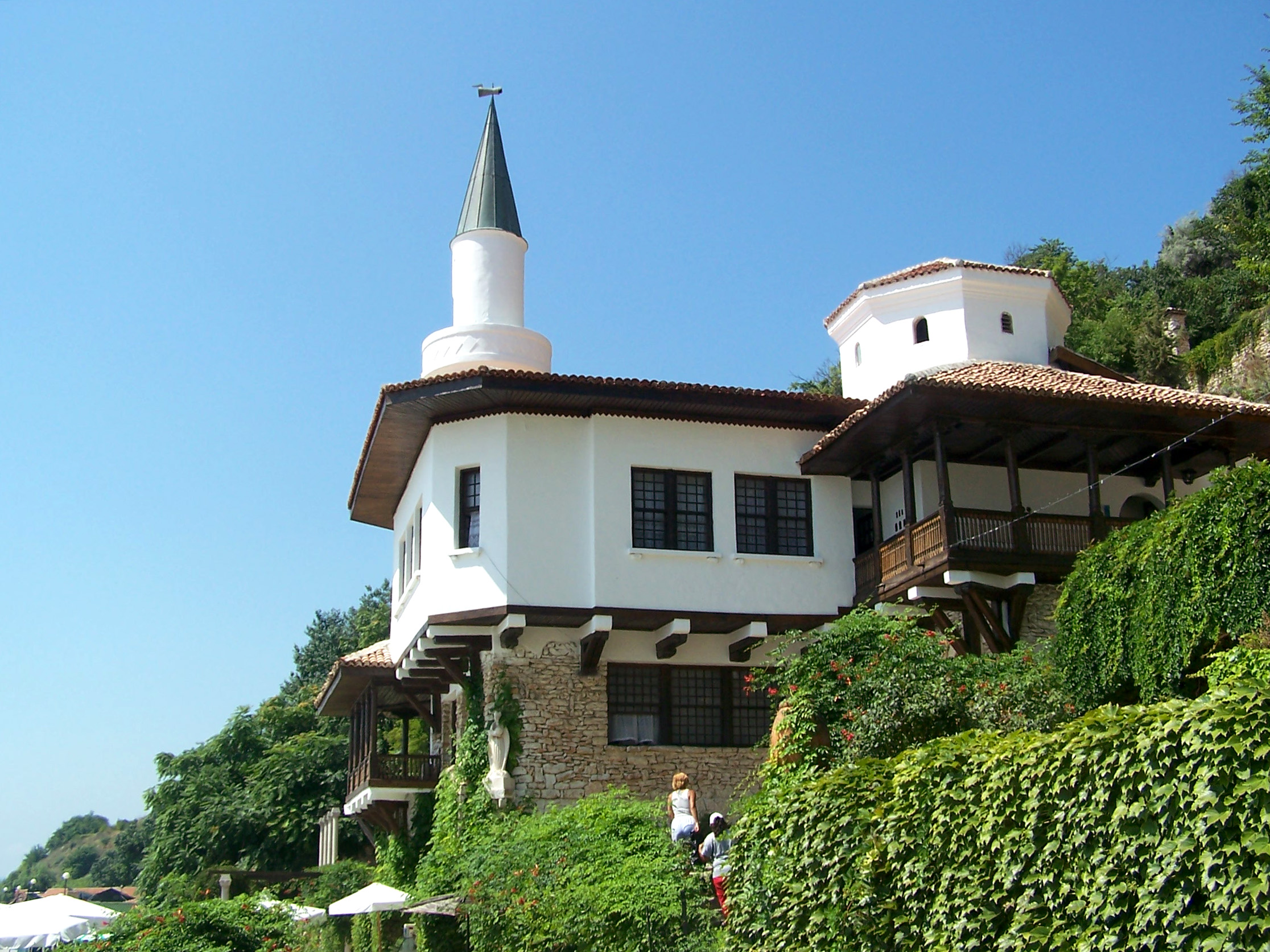
- Balchik Palace, constructed in the interwar period on orders of Queen Maria of Romania.

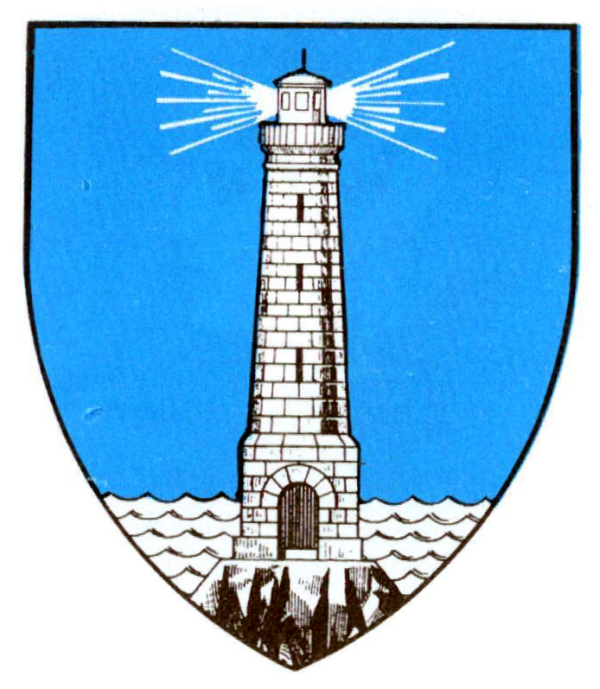
- Coat of arms

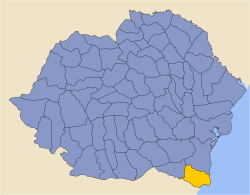
- Country: Romania
- Historic region: Dobrogea
- Capital city (Reședință de județ): Bazargic
- Established: After the Treaty of Bucharest (1913)
- Ceased to exist: Administrative and Constitutional Reform in 1938

Area
  - Total: 4,500 km^{2} (1,700 sq mi)

Population (1930)
  - Total: 166,911
  - Density: 37/km^{2} (96/sq mi)
- Time zone: UTC+2 (EET)
  - Summer (DST): UTC+3 (EEST)

Caliacra County was a county (județ) of Romania in the interwar period, in Southern Dobruja, with the seat at Bazargic (today Dobrich, Bulgaria).

The county was located in the south-eastern part of Romania, in the Southern Dobruja region, known as Cadrilater. Currently the territory of the former county is part of Bulgaria, mostly forming Dobrich Province, although several villages in the south are included in Varna Province. It bordered on the north with Constanța County, northwest with Durostor County, south with the Kingdom of Bulgaria, and on the east with the Black Sea.

== Administration ==
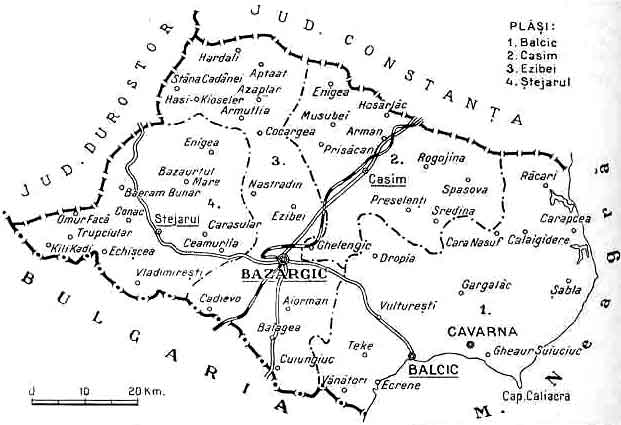
Map of Caliacra County as constituted in 1938.

The county consisted of 4 districts (plăși):

1. Plasa Balcic, headquartered at Balcic
2. Plasa Casim, headquartered at Casim
3. Plasa Ezibei, headquartered at Bazargic
4. Plasa Stejarul, headquartered at Stejarul

== Etymology ==
The county was named after the Cape of Caliacra (today Kaliakra, Bulgaria). Kalli Akra in Greek means "Good shelter." This promontory, at the foot of which the last endemic Monachus monachus albiventer (seal) lived until 1940, was a natural reserve.

== History ==
The promontory of Caliacra was first strengthened by Tirizi, of the Getae, and early hellenized by the nearby colonies Dionysopolis (Balchik) and Kallatis (Mangalia) under the name of Tirizis. In succession, a Roman, Byzantine, Bulgarian, and Byzantine fortress, it seems to have been the capital of the despotate of Dobruja between 1346 and 1402 when Mircea I of Wallachia became master of the "Great Sea". It is known that the Genoese traded here. The Turks besieged the city several times, conquering it finally in 1444; at which time it was laid ruin. The Bulgarians made the defense of the city a patriotic legend, the tragic outcome of which is the suicide of the 40 virgins (a legend also found in the Serbian and Greek folklore).

As a result of Romania's involvement in Bulgaria during the Second Balkan War, Southern Dobruja (the part of Bulgaria north of the Tutrakan - Balchik line) was annexed by Romania in 1913, despite criticism from the political opposition (e.g. the socialist Constantin Dobrogeanu-Gherea), who considered that this act would create for Romania a new and fierce enemy over a 600-km border on its southern flank, where, until then, it had a friendly neighbor whose independence had been obtained simultaneously in the same war.

After the region was annexed by Romania as a result of the Treaty of Bucharest (1913), Bulgaria managed to regain it between 1916 and 1918 (see the Romanian Campaign (1916) and Treaty of Bucharest (1918)), but then lost it again after the end of World War I (see Treaty of Neuilly).

After the 1938 Administrative and Constitutional Reform, the county was merged with the counties of Constanța, Durostor and Ialomița to form Ținutul Mării.

On September 7, 1940, the former county with the whole Southern Dobruja was returned to Bulgaria (see Treaty of Craiova).

== Coat of arms ==
The Coat of Arms depicted a shining lighthouse.

== Population ==
According to the Romanian census of 1930 the population of Caliacra County was 166,911, of which 42.4% were ethnic Bulgarians, 23.0% Turks, 22.6% Romanians, 3.8% Gagauz, 2.7% Tatars, 1.4% Gypsies and 4.1% other ethnic groups: Greeks, Jews, Armenians, Circassians. Classified by religion: 70.4% Orthodox Christian, 28.2% Islam.

=== Urban population ===
In 1930, the county's urban population was 41,588, of which 39.8% were Bulgarians, 24.1% Turkish, 15.4% Romanians and Aromanians, 6.9% Romanies, 3.6% Gagauz, 3.5% Tatars, 2.1% Greeks, 2.1% Armenians, as well as other minorities. From the religious point of view, the urban population consisted of 62.1% Eastern Orthodox, 34.1% Muslim, 1.7% Armenian-Gregorian, 1.0% Jewish, as well as other minorities.

== See also ==
- History of Romania
- History of Bulgaria
