= Odartsi =

- Village
- Location in Bulgaria
- Coordinates: 43°26′25″N 27°57′45″E
- Country: Bulgaria
- Province: Dobrich Province
- Municipality: Dobrichka
- Time zone: UTC+2 (EET)
  - Summer (DST): UTC+3 (EEST)

Odartsi is a village in the municipality of Dobrichka, in Dobrich Province, in northeastern Bulgaria.
