= Dobrevo =

Dobrevo Добрево
- Village
- Location within Bulgaria
- Coordinates: 43°45′N 27°50′E
- Country: Bulgaria
- Province: Dobrich Province
- Municipality: Dobrichka
- Time zone: UTC+2 (EET)
  - Summer (DST): UTC+3 (EEST)

Dobrevo (Bulgarian: Добрево) is a village in the municipality of Dobrichka, in Dobrich Province, in northeastern Bulgaria.

The most significant Dobrujan German colony in Bulgaria was founded in Dobrevo (Ali Anife Kalfa) in 1903 by German Roman Catholics from the Crimea and Kherson. The colonists numbered around 150 in 1909 and built a stone church in 1911. The village was briefly renamed to Germantsi (Германци; "Germans") in honour of the colonists once it was returned to Bulgarian control in 1940. 325 Germans left Ali Anife Kalfa to relocate to Germany in 1943 as part of the Heim ins Reich policy.
