= Enevo, Dobrich Province =

Enevo
- Village
- Location in Bulgaria
- Coordinates: 43°38′20″N 27°31′35″E
- Country: Bulgaria
- Province: Dobrich Province
- Municipality: Dobrichka
- Time zone: UTC+2 (EET)
  - Summer (DST): UTC+3 (EEST)

Enevo is a village in the municipality of Dobrichka, in Dobrich Province, in the northeast part of Bulgaria, about 20 miles (32 km) west of the Black Sea. The village is situated 7.5 mi (12.1 km) from the remains of the ancient town of Pliska, the first capital of the First Bulgarian Empire.
