= Georgi Keranov =

Bulgarian sports shooter

Personal information
- Born: 1 April 1922 Kolartsi, Bulgaria
- Died: 16 August 1988 (aged 66)

Sport
- Sport: Sports shooting

Georgi Keranov (Bulgarian: Георги Керанов, 1 April 1922 – 16 August 1988) was a Bulgarian sports shooter. He competed in the 25 m pistol event at the 1952 Summer Olympics.
