= Plachi Dol =

- Village
- Location within Bulgaria
- Coordinates: 43°32′N 27°53′E
- Country: Bulgaria
- Province: Dobrich Province
- Municipality: Dobrichka
- Time zone: UTC+2 (EET)
  - Summer (DST): UTC+3 (EEST)

Plachi Dol is a village in the municipality of Dobrichka, in Dobrich Province, which is in northeastern Bulgaria.
