= Medovo, Dobrich Province =

Medovo
- Village
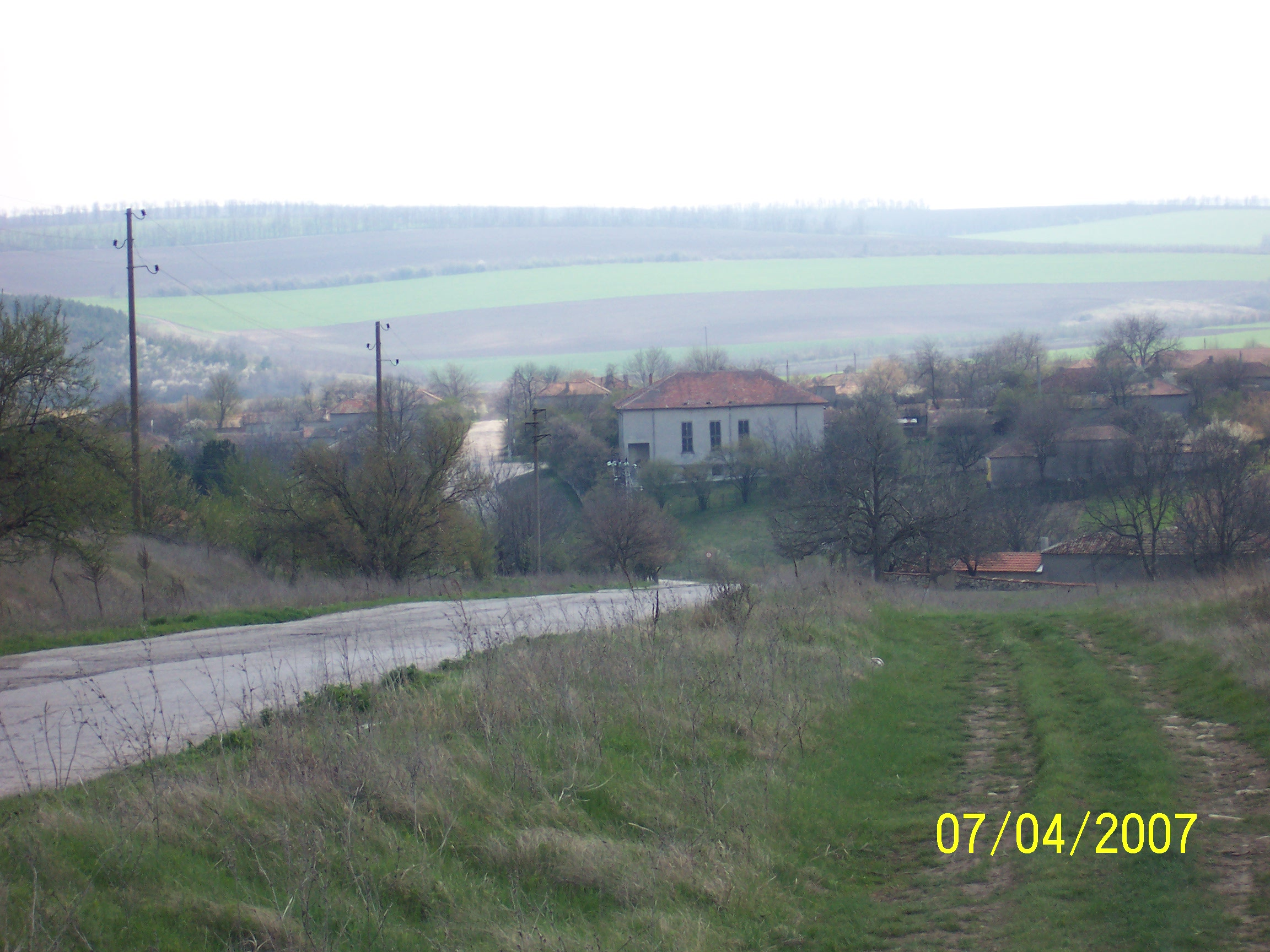
- View of the village of Medovo, Dobrich region, Bulgaria

- Location in Bulgaria
- Coordinates: 43.608°N 27.537°E
- Country: Bulgaria
- Province: Dobrich Province
- Municipality: Dobrichka
- Time zone: UTC+2 (EET)
  - Summer (DST): UTC+3 (EEST)

Medovo is a village in the municipality of Dobrichka, in Dobrich Province, in northeastern Bulgaria.
