= Lomnitsa, Dobrich Province =

Lomnitsa
- Village
- Location in Bulgaria
- Coordinates: 43.684°N 27.861°E
- Country: Bulgaria
- Province: Dobrich Province
- Municipality: Dobrichka
- Time zone: UTC+2 (EET)
  - Summer (DST): UTC+3 (EEST)

Lomnitsa is a village in the municipality of Dobrichka, in Dobrich Province, in northeastern Bulgaria.
