= Debrene, Dobrich Province =

Debrene
- Village
- Location in Bulgaria
- Coordinates: 43°23′20″N 27°51′50″E
- Country: Bulgaria
- Province: Dobrich Province
- Municipality: Dobrichka
- Time zone: UTC+2 (EET)
  - Summer (DST): UTC+3 (EEST)

Debrene is a village in the municipality of Dobrichka, in Dobrich Province, in northeastern Bulgaria.

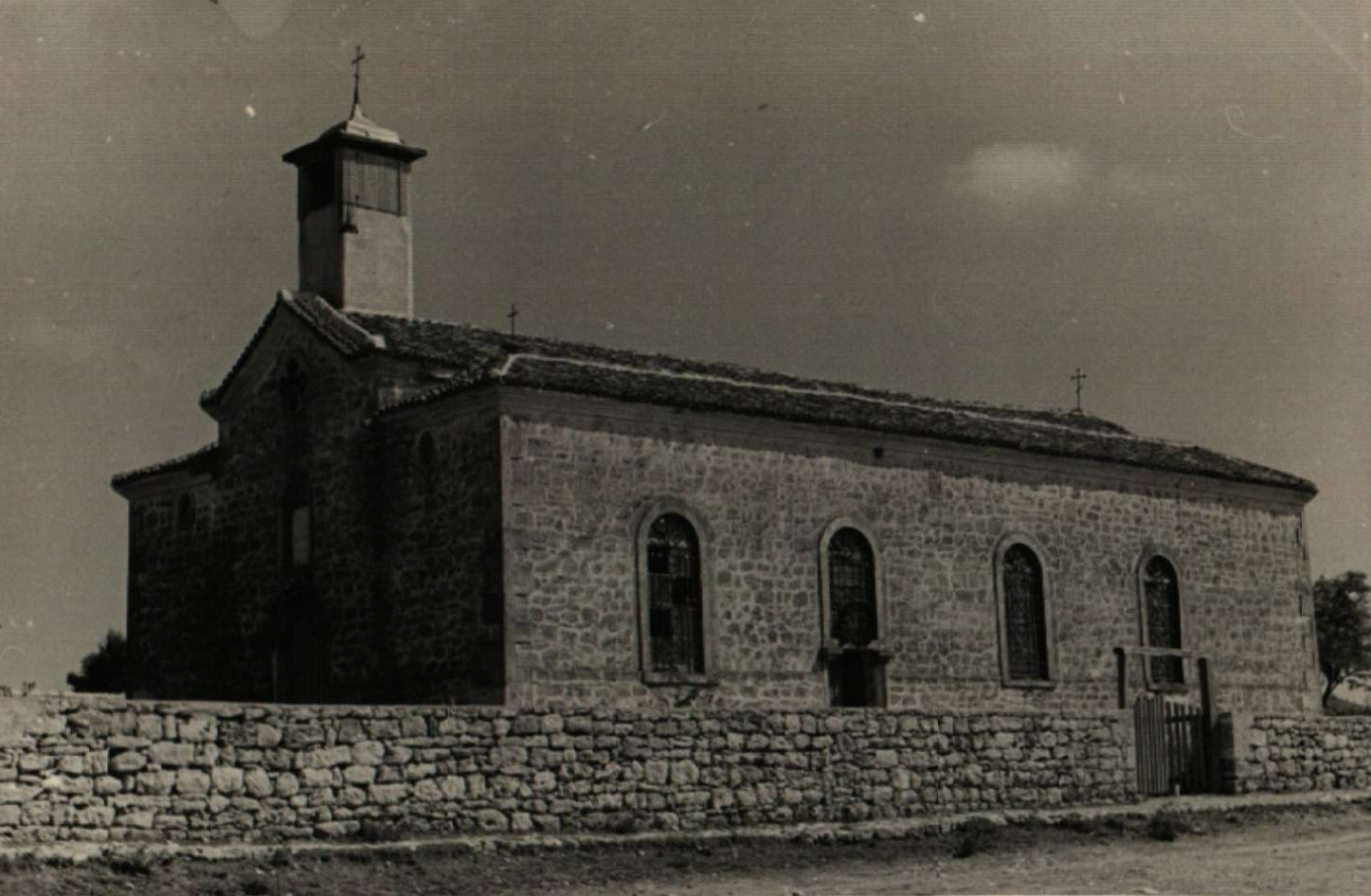
Church "Saint George", before 1945. Source: Bulgarian Archives State Agency
