= Guslar, Bulgaria =

- Village
- Location within Bulgaria
- Coordinates: 43°50′N 27°27′E
- Country: Bulgaria
- Province: Dobrich Province
- Municipality: Tervel
- Time zone: UTC+2 (EET)
  - Summer (DST): UTC+3 (EEST)

Guslar, Bulgaria is a village in Tervel Municipality, Dobrich Province, in northeastern Bulgaria.

== Population ==
2011 Population Census

Number and share of ethnic groups according to the 2011 census:

	Number	Share (in %)
Total	20	100.00
Bulgarians	3	15
Turks	7	35
Gypsies	0	0.00
Others	0	0.00
They do not self-define	0	0.00
Unanswered	10	50
