= Pchelnik, Russia =

Pchelnik (Russian: Пчельник) is the name of several rural localities in Russia:

- Pchelnik, Republic of Bashkortostan, a village in Bizhbulyaksky Selsoviet of Bizhbulyaksky District in the Republic of Bashkortostan
- Pchelnik, Chelyabinsk Oblast, a khutor under the administrative jurisdiction of the Town of Plast in Plastovsky District of Chelyabinsk Oblast
