= Kranevo =

Kranevo Кранево
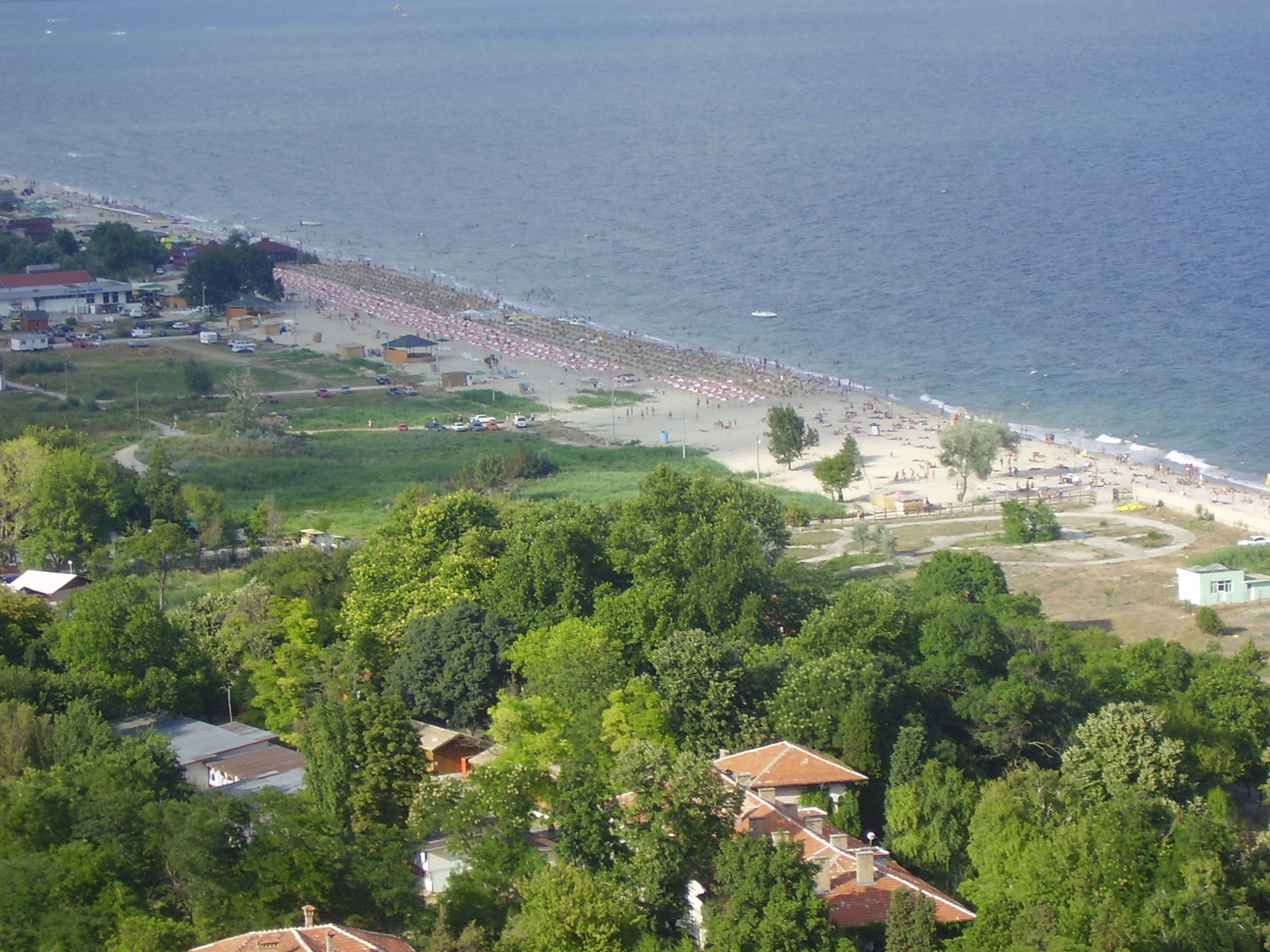
- Beach near Kranevo

- Location of Kranevo
- Coordinates: 43°20′N 28°3′E
- Country: Bulgaria
- Provinces (Oblast): Dobrich

Government
  - Mayor: Atanaska Ivanova
- Elevation: 142 m (466 ft)

Population (2009)
  - Total: 992
- Time zone: UTC+2 (EET)
  - Summer (DST): UTC+3 (EEST)
- Postal Code: 9649
- Area code: 0579

Kranevo (Bulgarian: Кранево) is a coastal village on the northern Bulgarian Black Sea Coast, part of Balchik Municipality, Dobrich Province. It is located in the historical region of Southern Dobruja. Between 1913 and 1940 it was part of Romania, being its southernmost settlement. An important lighthouse is installed on Cape Ekrene, 3 km (2 mi) south of the village. Kranevo enjoys high tourist population during summers and two of the reasons are its proximity to Albena (less than half an hour on foot, by walking on the beach) and its clearly lower prices.

== History ==
The settlement was founded in the Ancient period, probably by the ancient Thracians and in the next periods was part of the Roman, Bulgarian and Ottoman Empires. Its name during Ottoman rule was Ekrene, and Ecrene under Romanian administration.

Due to the constant landslide activity in the area, the activity of the lighthouse was stopped.

Not far from it are the remains of the defensive shaft, which played an important role in the defense of the First Bulgarian State, called Asparuhov shaft. On the huge hill near today's Kranevo, the Ekren fortress (fortress) was once located.

From 1913 to 1940, Kranevo was part of Caliacra County of the Kingdom of Romania, being the southernmost point of the country at the time.

In 1950 a Labor Cooperative Agricultural Farm (TKZS) was established in the village. In 1958 the labor troops passed the road from Balchik, Albena through Kranevo to Golden Sands and Varna.

Kranevo Point on Tower Island in the Palmer Archipelago, Antarctica is named after Kranevo.

== Temples ==
- Orthodox Church of the Holy Mother of God - Worthy to Eat - consecrated on June 8, 2019.

== Annual events ==
- In 2010 on the territory of the resort was built swimming pool "Aqua Life" with Olympic size, equipped for international competitions in swimming, water polo and synchronized swimming. From 13 to 17 September 2011 was held the First International Women's Water Polo Tournament "Kranevo Cup" under the auspices of LEN.jhb.
- Sprat Festival - held regularly since 2015 in June.
