= Yovkovo =

Yovkovo Йовково
- Village
- Location within Bulgaria
- Coordinates: 43°46′N 28°08′E
- Country: Bulgaria
- Province: Dobrich Province
- Municipality: General Toshevo Municipality

Area
  - Total: 7.937 km^{2} (3.064 sq mi)
- Elevation: 170 m (560 ft)

Population (2019)
  - Total: 256
- Time zone: UTC+2 (EET)
  - Summer (DST): UTC+3 (EEST)

Yovkovo (Bulgarian: Йовково [ˈjɔfkovo]) is a village in General Toshevo Municipality, Dobrich Province, in northeastern Bulgaria. The village is named after Yordan Yovkov in 1942. Its Turkish name was Chifut Kyusu (Bulgarian: Чифут Куюсу; Turkish: Çıfıt Kuyusu).

The village has a population of 256 people (as of 2019), down from its peak of 782 inhabitants in 1985. The population consists mainly of ethnic Turks and Tatars. The village used to be part of Romania between 1913 and 1940.
