= Draganovo, Dobrich Province =

Draganovo
- Village
- Location in Bulgaria
- Coordinates: 43°28′25″N 27°47′00″E
- Country: Bulgaria
- Province: Dobrich Province
- Municipality: Dobrichka
- Time zone: UTC+2 (EET)
  - Summer (DST): UTC+3 (EEST)

Draganovo is a village that is located in the municipality of Dobrichka, in the Dobrich Province, in northeastern Bulgaria.
