= Batovo, Vologda Oblast =

Batovo Батово
- Village
- Location within Vologda Oblast Location within Russia
- Coordinates: 58°34′N 40°25′E
- Country: Russia
- Region: Vologda Oblast
- District: Gryazovetsky District
- Time zone: UTC+3:00

Batovo (Russian: Батово) is a rural locality (a village) in Rostilovskoye Rural Settlement, Gryazovetsky District, Vologda Oblast, Russia. The population was 117 as of 2002.

== Geography ==
Batovo is located 39 km (24 mi) south of Gryazovets (the district's administrative centre) by road. Maximovo is the nearest locality. bat may be in sanskrit and dialekt of Arkhangelsk`s region
