= Bdintsi =

- Village
- Location within Bulgaria
- Coordinates: 43°32′N 27°31′E
- Country: Bulgaria
- Province: Dobrich Province
- Municipality: Dobrichka
- Time zone: UTC+2 (EET)
  - Summer (DST): UTC+3 (EEST)

Bdintsi is a village in the municipality of Dobrichka in Dobrich Province, which is located in northeastern Bulgaria. As of the 2021, Bdintsi has a population of 56 residents
