= Senokos, Dobrich Province =

Senokos
- Village
- Location within Bulgaria
- Coordinates: 43.5167°N 28.0167°E
- Country: Bulgaria
- Province: Dobrich Province
- Municipality: Balchik
- Time zone: UTC+2 (EET)
  - Summer (DST): UTC+3 (EEST)

Senokos is a village in Balchik Municipality, Dobrich Province, northeastern Bulgaria.

Senokos Nunatak on Trinity Peninsula in Antarctica is named after the village.
