= Tsarevets, Dobrich Province =

Tsarevets
- Village
- Location in Bulgaria
- Coordinates: 43°38′40″N 27°53′50″E
- Country: Bulgaria
- Province: Dobrich Province
- Municipality: Dobrichka
- Time zone: UTC+2 (EET)
  - Summer (DST): UTC+3 (EEST)

Tsarevets is a village in the municipality of Dobrichka, in Dobrich Province, in northeastern Bulgaria.
