= Hitovo =

- Village
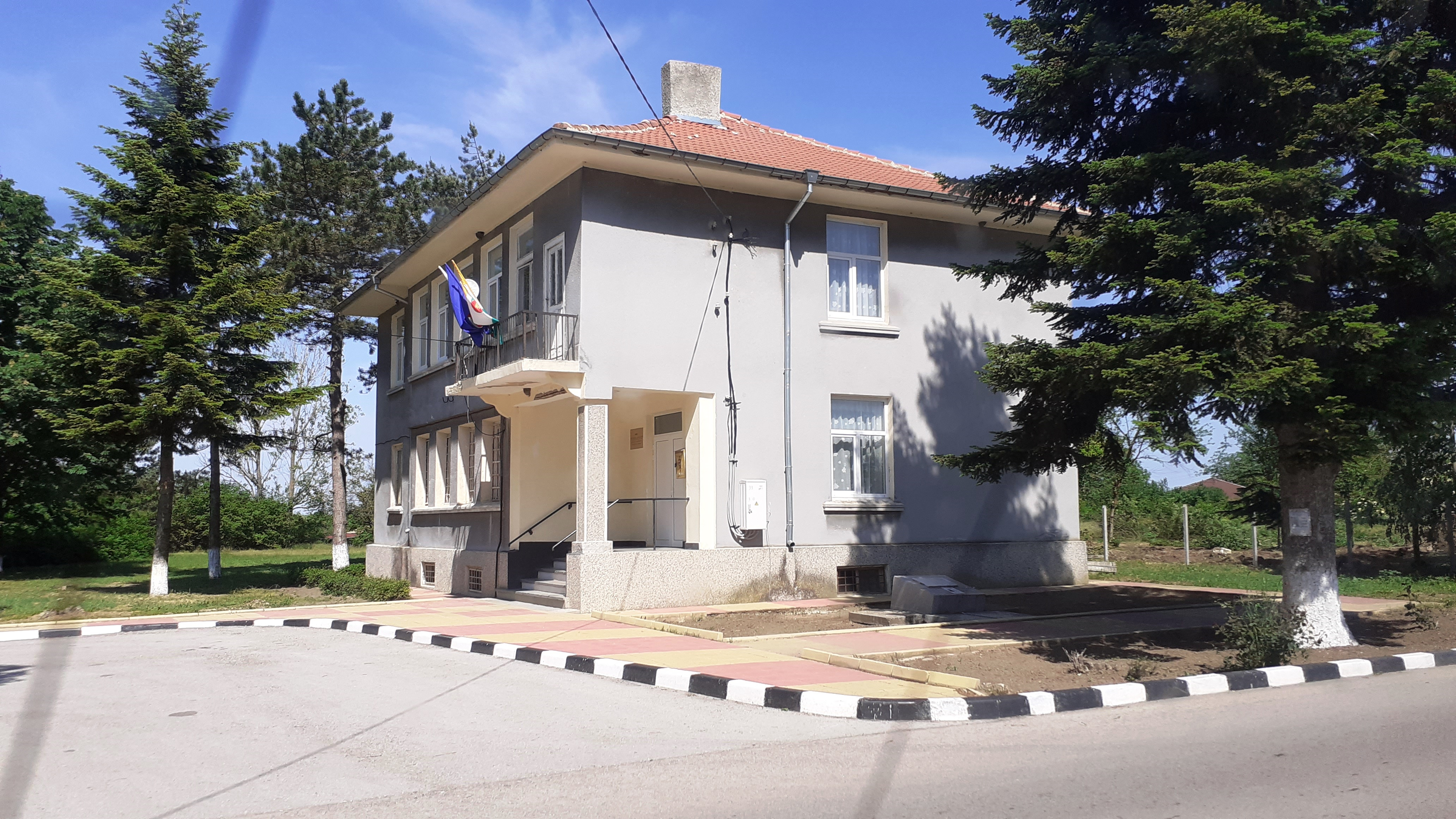
- Hitovo, Dobrich province

- Location in Bulgaria
- Coordinates: 43°46′10″N 27°33′25″E
- Country: Bulgaria
- Province: Dobrich Province
- Municipality: Dobrichka
- Time zone: UTC+2 (EET)
  - Summer (DST): UTC+3 (EEST)

Hitovo is a village in the municipality of Dobrichka, in Dobrich Province, in northeastern Bulgaria.
