= Pchelnik, Republic of Bashkortostan =

Pchelnik Пчельник
- Village
- Location within Bashkortostan Location within Russia
- Coordinates: 53°38′N 54°14′E
- Country: Russia
- Region: Bashkortostan
- District: Bizhbulyaksky District
- Time zone: UTC+5:00

Pchelnik (Russian: Пчельник) is a rural locality (a village) in Bizhbulyaksky Selsoviet, Bizhbulyaksky District, Bashkortostan, Russia. The population was 56 as of 2010. There is 1 street.

== Geography ==
Pchelnik is located 10 km southwest of Bizhbulyak (the district's administrative centre) by road. Lassirma is the nearest rural locality.
