= Ovcharovo, Dobrich Province =

Ovcharovo
- Village
- Location in Bulgaria
- Coordinates: 43.700°N 27.846°E
- Country: Bulgaria
- Province: Dobrich Province
- Municipality: Dobrichka
- Time zone: UTC+2 (EET)
  - Summer (DST): UTC+3 (EEST)

Ovcharovo is a village in the municipality of Dobrichka, in Dobrich Province, in northeastern Bulgaria.
