= Slaveevo, Dobrich Province =

Slaveevo
- Village
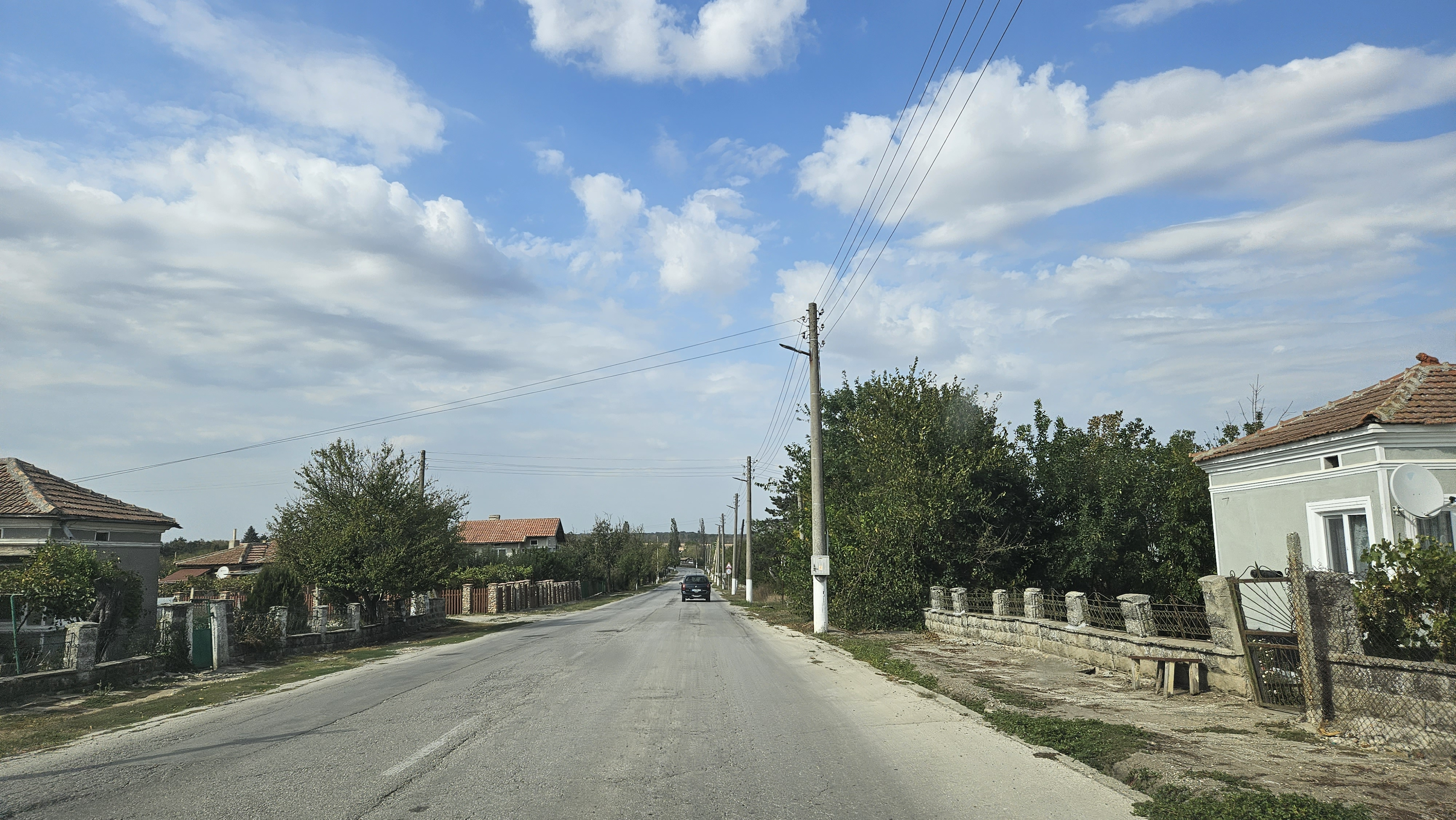
- Main street in Slaveevo

- Location in Bulgaria
- Coordinates: 43.476°N 27.917°E
- Country: Bulgaria
- Province: Dobrich Province
- Municipality: Dobrichka
- Time zone: UTC+2 (EET)
  - Summer (DST): UTC+3 (EEST)

Slaveevo is a village in the municipality of Dobrichka, in Dobrich Province, in northeastern Bulgaria.
