= Frangen Plateau =

Geomorphological feature of Bulgaria's Danubian Plain

- Plateau
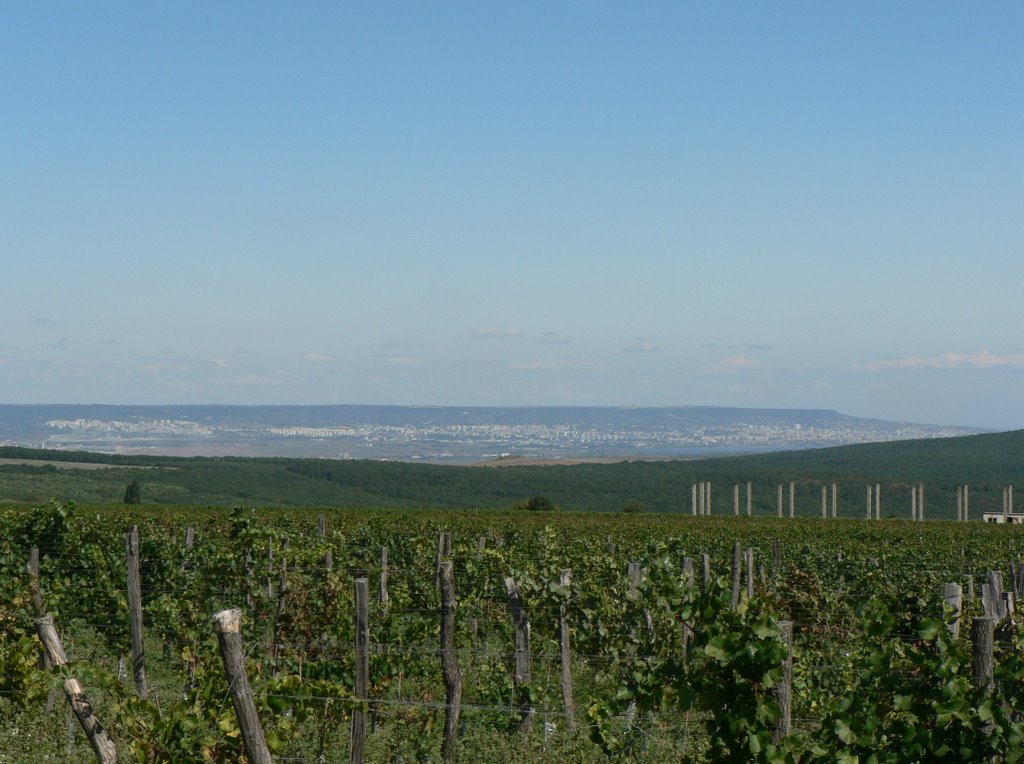
- The historic battle of Varna took place on the plateau.

- Coordinates: 43°17′28″N 27°49′26″E
- Location: Danubian Plain, Bulgaria

The Frangen Plateau (Bulgarian: Франгенско плато) occupies the easternmost part of the Danubian Plain (Bulgaria).
