= Kolartsi =

- Village
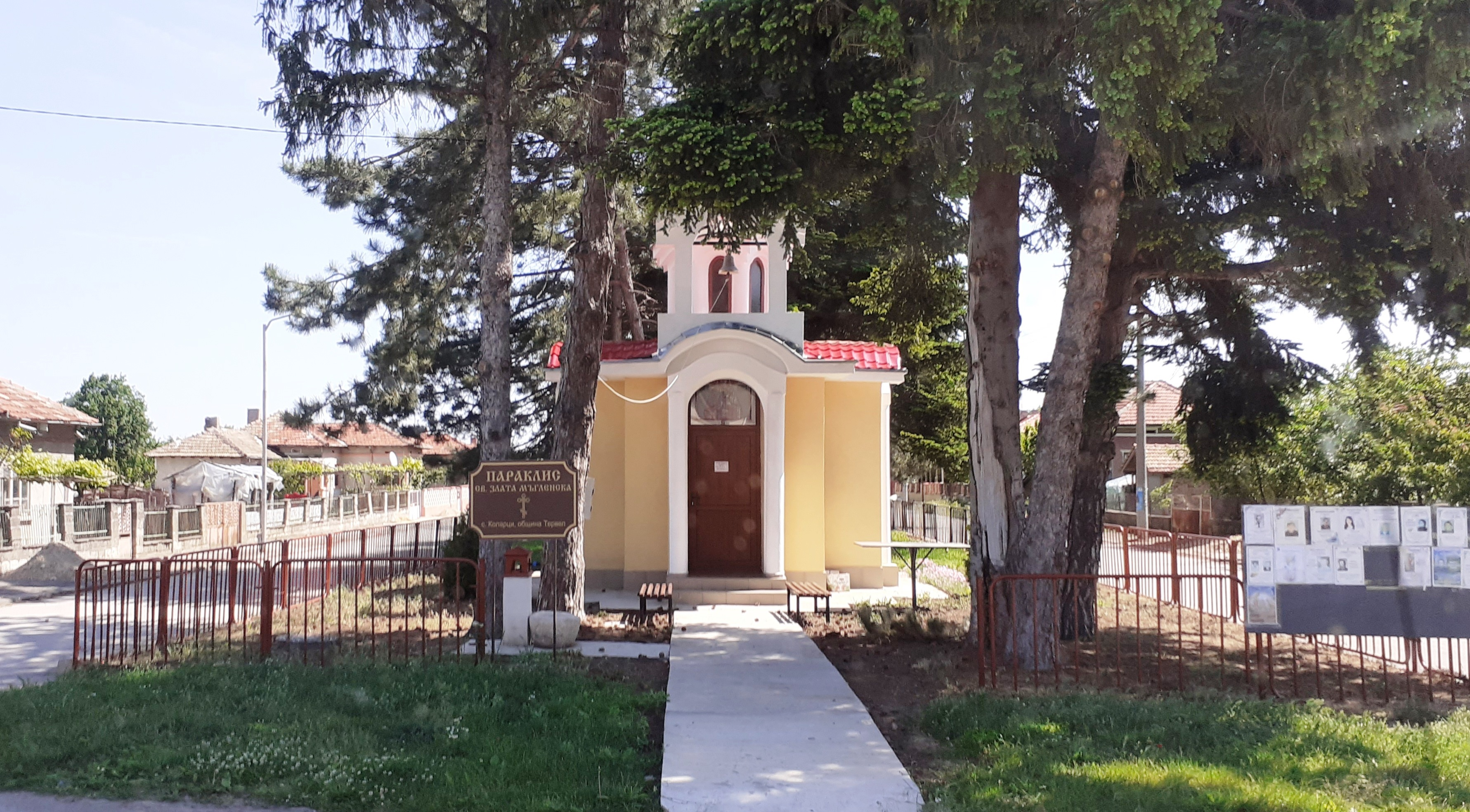
- Zlata Maglenska Chapel in the village of Kolartsi, Tervel municipality

- Location within Bulgaria
- Coordinates: 43°51′N 27°33′E
- Country: Bulgaria
- Province: Dobrich Province
- Municipality: Tervel
- Time zone: UTC+2 (EET)
  - Summer (DST): UTC+3 (EEST)

Kolartsi is a village in Tervel Municipality, Dobrich Province, in northeastern Bulgaria. Olympian Georgi Keranov was born here.
