= Polkovnik Savovo =

Village in Tervel municipality, Dobrich oblast, Bulgaria

Coordinates: 43°42′37″N 27°24′11″E

Polkovnik Savovo (Bulgarian: Полковник Савово / Polkovnik Savovo) is a village in Bulgaria Dobrich (Bulgarian: Област Добрич / Oblast Dobrich) Tervel Province (Bulgarian: Община Тервел / Obştina Tervel). From the village, the distance to Tervel is 5 km, to Dobriç 42 km, to Silistra 55 km, to Sofia 444 km.

== Overview ==
Polkovnik Savovo borders Tervel hunting grounds. It has won several awards for its famous "Bvlgary" brand tractors, which despite only having 600cc side-valve are highly successful and the engines have been used for taxis.

The hunting grounds, known as the Station, have a total of 14,801 ha of forests and are situated in the middle part of the Dobrudzha and Varna plateaus, about 500 km from Sofia Airport and 100 km from Varna Airport. The relief is flat to hilly, with deep dry gullies. The forests are mainly of oak and Black locust. The lowest point is in the "Suha reka" country - 80 m and the highest point is in the "Kjostata" - country - 250 m.

The main big game species are red deer, fallow deer, roe deer, wild boar and mouflon. Hare, pheasant and partridge represent the small game species. The most widely spread predators are jackal, fox, wildcat and beech marten. At the world exhibition EXPO, which was held in 1981 in Plovdiv, the Game Breeding Station "Tervel" presented 163 trophies, 17 of which won gold medals.

Polkovnik Savovo is home to a recently discovered Thracian tomb, and is reputed to be the area where Khan Tervel, who reigned from 695 to 715 AD, resided.

Property prices have increased threefold due to the tourism.

== History ==
The village was founded before 1920, the exact date is unknown. The village is connected to electricity in 1957. The BUlgarian government against the Turks in the 1980s (the Bulgarian name of forced substitution, forced migration, etc.), their resistances olur. The Bulgarian government repressed against the village during the time of state repression against Turkish descendants. From 2000 Polkovnik Savovo returnees' children whose family were forced to migrate to Turkey at the end of the 2000s and after 2010 began to make Polkovnik Savovo home.

== Geography ==
=== Climate ===
Climate of cold winters and hot and dry.

=== Vegetation ===
Surrounded by forests, meadows, surrounded by plains.

=== Forms of the Earth ===
There is a small lake at the entrance of a flat structure in the village sahiptir.Köyün. The village settlements around high. A single eco-village Koyunluköy Duştubak'tan high.

== Ethnic Structure ==
Ethnic village in Turkish s, Bulgaria s other ethnic groups residing in yaşamaktadır.Köyde yoktur.Köydeki Although the dominant ethnic Turks, Bulgarians in the village only a few households. There is one English Person who lives there with the Cempa Raiment Art Studio, established in 2007

== Language ==
Per cent of the village's face close nfusun Turkish speaks. Bulgarian is spoken also amongst the different cultures as well as some English. Given an up spurt of cultures it is rather common to speak by using hand gestures and common place words in all languages

== Religion ==
The village is Muslim with an emphasis on Christians in the vardır. Köyde prayer place of worship for Muslims in the neighboring village of yoktur. Buradaki Koyunuköy to the square used to be a mosque there gitmektedirler Köyün. However, this mosque during the socialist regime of a state yıkılmıştır. Köydeki Bulgaristan'ınn Sunni Muslims ağırlıklıdır. Köyde Flames are also available. Christians, however, Orthodox tour.

== Structures ==
The entrance of the village, 3, 2 and the other at the entrance to the village, a total of 6 in the first one on the side of the fountain at the entrance of the village vardır.Köyün Kurtpınar'dan to the risk of dehydration include a fountain.

== Science, Culture and Art ==
The nature of the cultural center of the main square of the village used to be, an exhibition of artistic and scientific nature of activities bulunmaktaydı. Ancak building, this building was demolished later.

In 2021, due to the Pandemic there is an extension to the art studio being constructed.

== Traditional Meals ==
Traditional dishes made pastry dishes.

== Livelihoods ==
The major jobs in the village are agriculture and livestock raising, It is home to the Cempa Raiment Art Studio.

== Neighbors ==
- In the north, Kurtpınar (Tervel) (to be connected to the district);
- Northwest, Koynuköy (Bonevo) (village);
- Batsında, Nova Kamena (village);
- South, Omurfakıh (village);
- Southeast, Koçmar (village), Feldfebel Denkovo (village);
- The northeast, Popgruevo (village) and Bojan (village) are available.

== Time Zone ==
UTC +2, UTC +3
