= Tsarkva =

- Village
- Location within Bulgaria
- Coordinates: 42°35′N 23°07′E
- Country: Bulgaria
- Province: Dobrich Province
- Municipality: Balchik
- Time zone: UTC+2 (EET)
  - Summer (DST): UTC+3 (EEST)

Tsarkva is a village in Balchik Municipality, Dobrich Province, northeastern Bulgaria.
