= Dobrichka Municipality =

Dobrichka Municipality Община Добричка
- Municipality
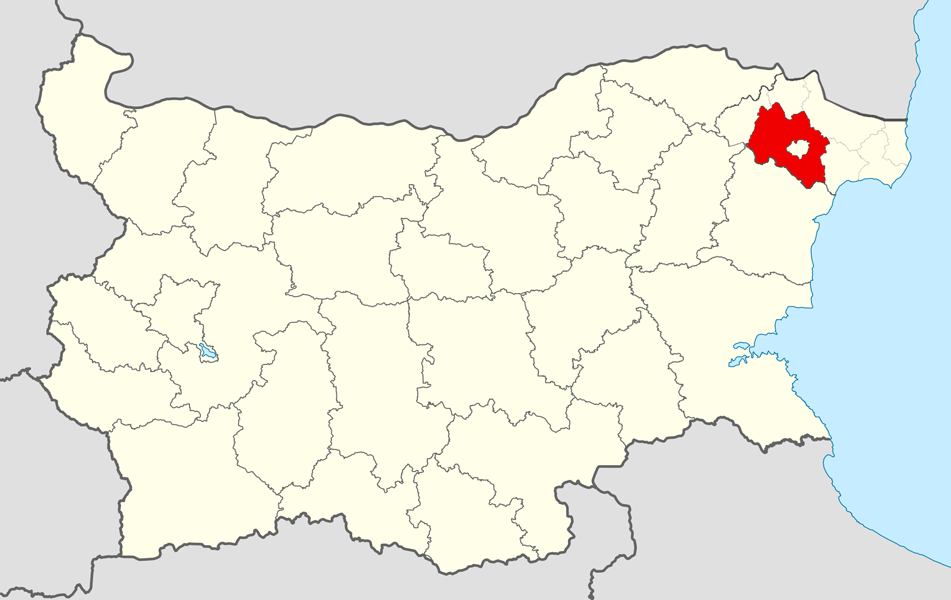
- Dobrichka Municipality within Bulgaria and Dobrich Province.
- Coordinates: 43°39′N 27°41′E
- Country: Bulgaria
- Province (Oblast): Dobrich
- Admin. centre (Obshtinski tsentar): Dobrich

Area
  - Total: 1,296.16 km^{2} (500.45 sq mi)

Population (December 2009)
  - Total: 24,292
  - Density: 18.742/km^{2} (48.540/sq mi)
- Time zone: UTC+2 (EET)
  - Summer (DST): UTC+3 (EEST)

Dobrichka municipality (Bulgarian: Община Добричка) or Dobrich rural municipality (Добрич-селска) is a municipality in Dobrich Province, Northeastern Bulgaria, located in Southern Dobruja geographical region. It lies in the central southern part of the province and is not to be confused with Dobrich municipality (equivalent to the town of Dobrich), which is an enclave within Dobrichka.

The municipality embraces a territory of 1,296.16 km^{2} (500.45 sq mi) with a population of 24,292 inhabitants, as of December 2009.

Although the city is not part of the municipality, the administration is headquartered in Dobrich.

== Settlements ==
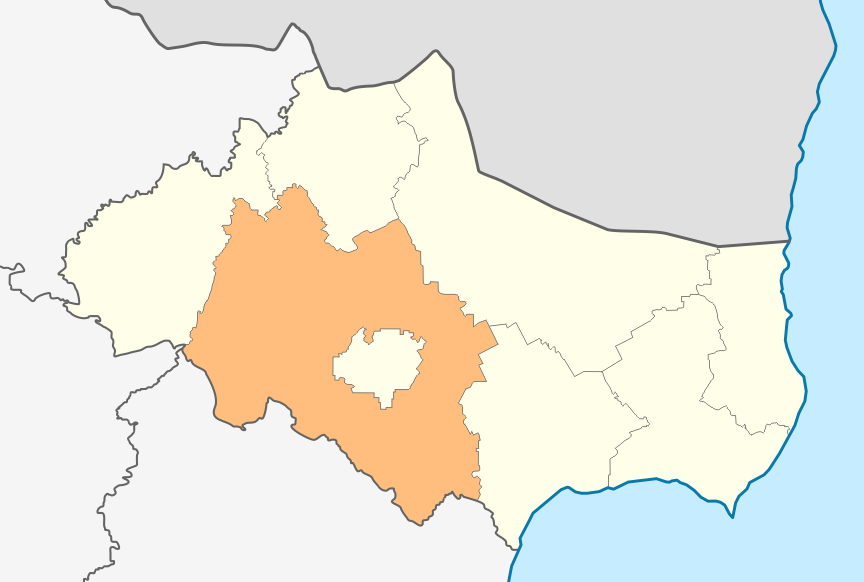
Dobrichka Municipality within Dobrich Province

Dobrichka municipality includes the following 68 villages:

- Altsek
- Batovo
- Bdintsi
- Benkovski
- Bogdan
- Bozhurovo
- Branishte
- Cherna
- Debrene
- Dobrevo
- Dolina
- Donchevo
- Draganovo
- Dryanovets
- Enevo
- Feldfebel Dyankovo
- General Kolevo
- Geshanovo
- Hitovo
- Kamen
- Karapelit
- Kotlentsi
- Kozloduytsi
- Kragulevo
- Lomnitsa
- Lovchantsi
- Lyaskovo
- Malka Smolnitsa
- Medovo
- Metodievo
- Miladinovtsi
- Novo Botevo
- Odartsi
- Odrintsi
- Opanets
- Orlova mogila
- Ovcharovo
- Paskalevo
- Pchelino
- Pchelnik
- Plachi Dol
- Pobeda
- Podslon
- Polkovnik Ivanovo
- Polkovnik Minkovo
- Polkovnik Sveshtarovo
- Popgrigorovo
- Prilep
- Primortsi
- Rosenovo
- Samuilovo
- Svoboda
- Slaveevo
- Sliventsi
- Smolnitsa
- Sokolnik
- Stefan Karadzha
- Stefanovo
- Stozher
- Tsarevets
- Tyanevo
- Vedrina
- Vladimirovo
- Vodnyantsi
- Vrachantsi
- Vratarite
- Zhitnitsa
- Zlatia

== Demography ==
The following table shows the change of the population during the last two decades. Dobrichka Municipality was separated from Dobrich Municipality in 1987.

Dobrichka rural Municipality
Year	1975	1985	1992	2001	2005	2007	2009	2011
Population	---	---	28,710	25,736	25,351	25,066	24,292	22,081
Sources: Census 2001, Census 2011, „pop-stat.mashke.org“,

=== Religion ===
According to the latest Bulgarian census of 2011, the religious composition, among those who answered the optional question on religious identification, was the following:

Religious composition of Dobrichka Municipality
Orthodox Christianity	55.8%
Catholicism	0.4%
Protestantism	0.5%
Islam	29.8%
No religion	2.9%
Prefer not to answer, others and indefinable	10.6%

== See also ==
- Provinces of Bulgaria
- Municipalities of Bulgaria
- List of cities and towns in Bulgaria
