= Karapelit =

Karapelit Карапелит
- Village
- Location within Bulgaria
- Coordinates: 43°38′57″N 27°34′14″E
- Country: Bulgaria
- Province: Dobrich Province
- Municipality: Dobrichka
- Time zone: UTC+2 (EET)
  - Summer (DST): UTC+3 (EEST)

Karapelit (Bulgarian: Карапелит, Romanian: Stejarul) is a village in the municipality of Dobrichka, in Dobrich Province, in northeastern Bulgaria.
