= Danubian Plain (Bulgaria) =

Geographic region in northern Bulgaria

Coordinates: 43°15′N 25°20′E

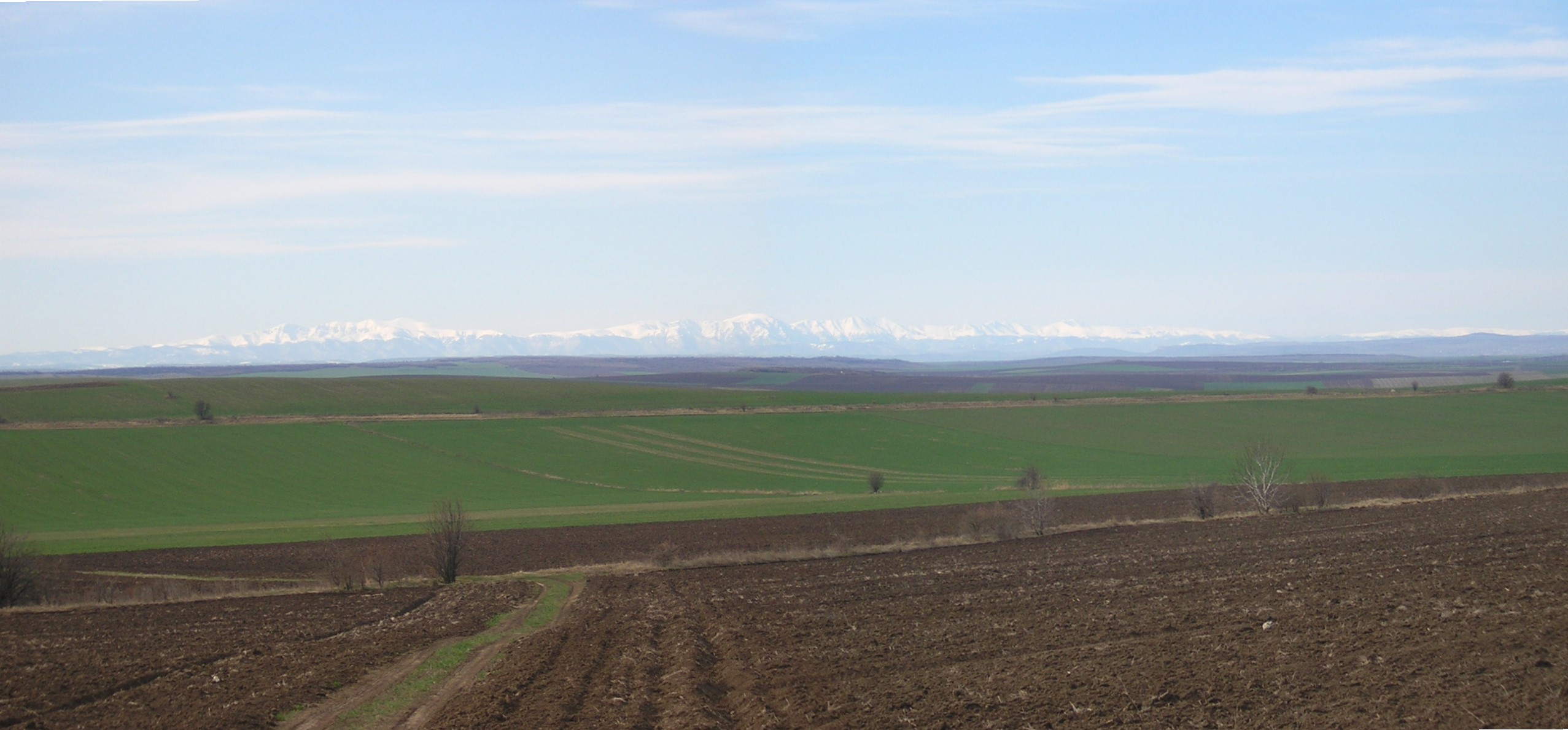
View across the Danubian Plain towards the central Balkan Mountains 90 km away

The Danubian Plain (Bulgarian: Дунавска равнина, romanized: Dunavska ravnina) constitutes the northern part of Bulgaria, situated north of the Balkan Mountains and south of the Danube. Its western border is the Timok River, and to the east it borders the Black Sea. The plain has an area of 31,523 square kilometres (12,171 sq mi). It is about 500 kilometres (310 mi) long and 20 to 120 kilometres (12 to 75 mi) wide.

The Danubian Plain is contiguous with the Wallachian Plain (forming the Lower Danubian Plain), but its elevation is slightly higher and the relief is more hilly and rolling, featuring numerous plateaux and river valleys. The climate is markedly temperate continental with a weak Black Sea influence in the east. Precipitation is on average 450–650 mm a year. Important rivers include the Danube, the Iskar, the Yantra, the Osam, the Vit, the Rusenski Lom, the Ogosta, and the Lom.

Among the major cities of the region are Rousse, Pleven, Dobrich, Shumen, Vidin, Silistra, Targovishte, Razgrad, Svishtov and Lom.

== Minerals ==
The Danubian Plain contains a wide variety of minerals, such as:

- Lignite (Lomski and Mareshki basins)
- Fireproof clay (Pleven)
- Oil, Petroleum (Dolen and Goren Dabnik, Pleven; from Tyulenovo to Shabla)
- Manganese (Obrochishte, Carkva, Ignatievo)
- Copper ore (Belogradchik)

== See also ==
- Northern Bulgaria
- Wallachian Plain
