= Dobrich Province =

Province in northeastern Bulgaria

Coordinates: 43°35′N 28°0′E

Dobrich Province Област Добрич
- Province
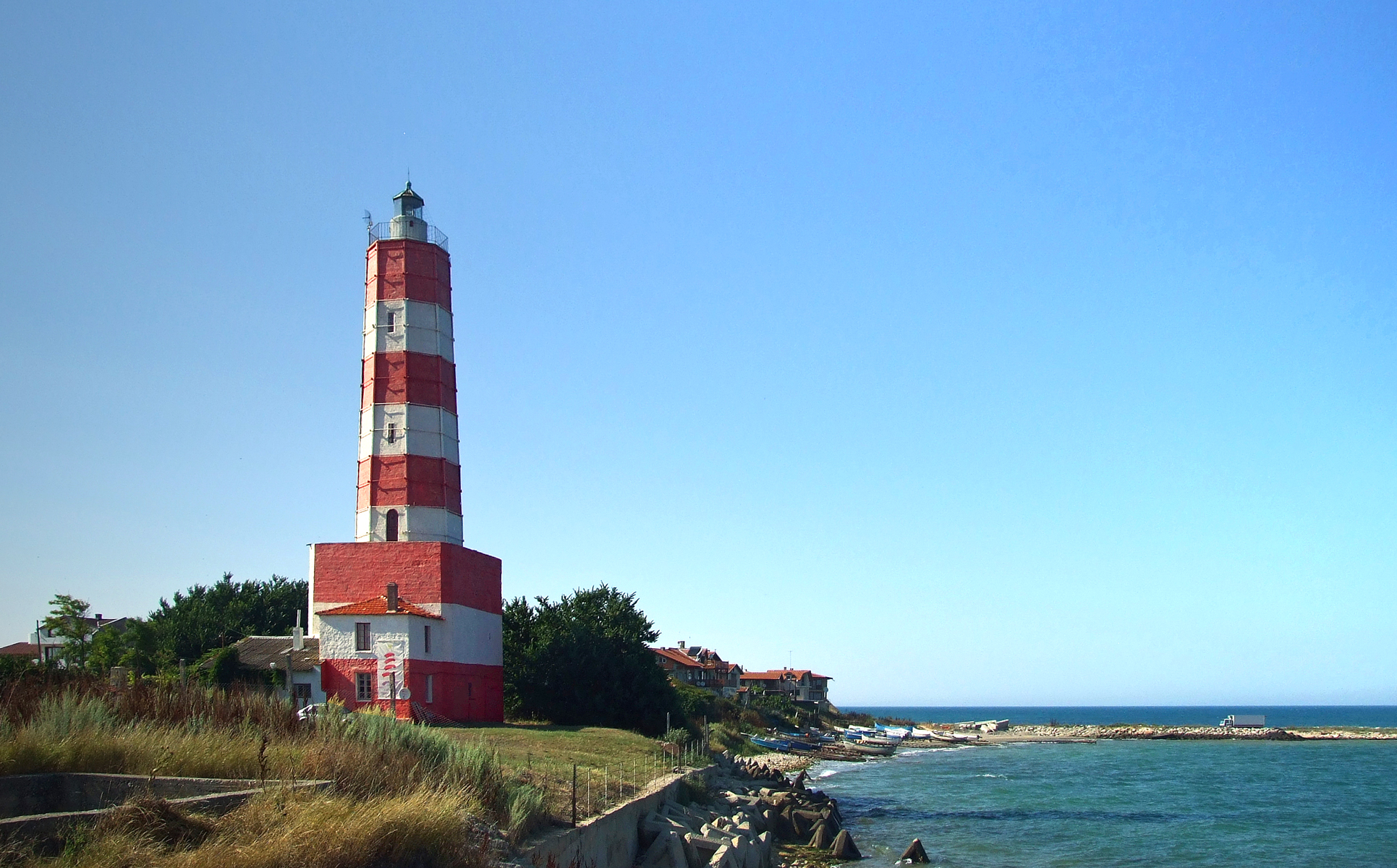
- Cape Slabla Lighthouse

- Flag Coat of arms

- Location of Dobrich Province in Bulgaria
- Country: Bulgaria
- Capital: Dobrich
- Municipalities: 8

Government
  - Governor: Zhelyazko Zhelyazkov

Area
  - Total: 4,719.71 km^{2} (1,822.29 sq mi)
- Elevation: 172 m (564 ft)

Population (December 2022)
  - Total: 147,208
  - Density: 31.1901/km^{2} (80.7819/sq mi)
- Time zone: UTC+2 (EET)
  - Summer (DST): UTC+3 (EEST)
- License plate: TX
- Website: dobrich.government.bg

Dobrich Province (Bulgarian: Област Добрич, Oblast Dobrich, former name Dobrich okrug) is a province in northeastern Bulgaria, part of Southern Dobruja geographical region. It is bounded on the east by the Black Sea, on the south by Varna Province, on the west by Shumen and Silistra provinces, and on the north by Romania. It is divided into eight municipalities. At the 2011 census, it had a population of 186,016. The province was part of Romania between 1913 and 1940.

== Municipalities ==
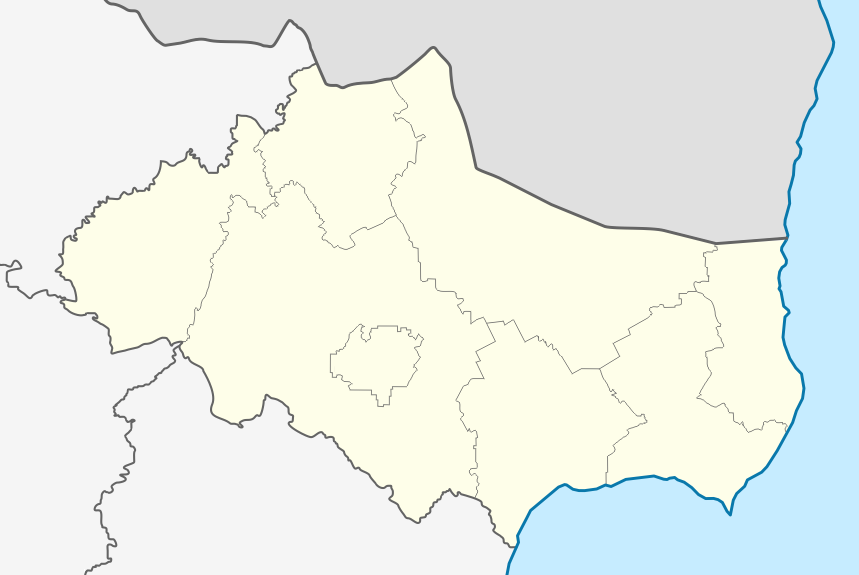

The Dobrich province (област, oblast) contains eight municipalities (singular: Bulgarian: община, romanized: obshtina - plural: общини, obshtini). The following table shows the names of each municipality in English and Cyrillic, the main town (in bold) or village, and the population of each in December 2009.

Municipality	Cyrillic	Pop.	Town/Village	Pop.
Balchik	Балчик	21,832	**Balchik**	12,196
Dobrich (city)	Добрич-Град	92,672	**Dobrich**	92,672
Dobrichka (rural)	Добричка	24,292	**Dobrich**	(above)
General Toshevo	Генерал Тошево	16,714	**General Toshevo**	7,130
Kavarna	Каварна	15,861	**Kavarna**	11,397
Krushari	Крушари	5,296	Krushari	1,619
Shabla	Шабла	5,580	**Shabla**	3,586
Tervel	Тервел	17,458	**Tervel**	6,667

== Demographics ==
Historical population
Year	Pop.	±%
1946	202,443	—
1956	227,425	+12.3%
1965	236,817	+4.1%
1975	251,072	+6.0%
1985	257,341	+2.5%
1992	232,780	−9.5%
2001	215,217	−7.5%
2011	189,677	−11.9%
2021	150,146	−20.8%
Source: pop-stat.mashke.org

The Dobrich province had a population of 215,232 (215,217 also given) according to a 2001 census, of which 49.3% were male and 50.7% were female.

At the end of 2009, the population of the province, announced by the Bulgarian National Statistical Institute, numbered 199,705 of which 23.8% are inhabitants aged over 60 years.

=== Ethnic groups ===
Ethnic groups in Dobrich Province (2011 census)
Ethnic group	Percentage
Bulgarians	75.4%
Turks	13.5%
Romani	8.8%
others and indefinable	2.3%

Total population (2011 census): 189 677

Ethnic groups (2011 census): Identified themselves: 173 899 persons:

- Bulgarians: 131 114 (75.40%)
- Turks: 23 484 (13.50%)
- Romani: 15 323 (8.81%)
- Others and indefinable: 3 978 (2.29%)

A further 15,000 persons in Dobrich Province did not declare their ethnic group at the 2011 census.

=== Religion ===
Religious adherence in the province according to 2001 census:

Census 2001
religious adherence	population	%
Orthodox Christians	163,091	75.78%
Muslims	44,277	20.57%
Roman Catholics	322	0.15%
Protestants	241	0.11%
Other	835	0.39%
Religion not mentioned	6,451	3.00%
total	215,217	100%

== Towns and villages ==
The place names in bold have the status of town (in Bulgarian: град, transliterated as grad). Other localities have the status of village (in Bulgarian: село, transliterated as selo).

=== Balchik municipality ===
Albena | Balchik | Bezvoditsa | Bobovets | Bryastovo | Dabrava | Dropla | Gurkovo | Hrabrovo | Karvuna | Kranevo | Kremena | Lyahovo | Obrochishte | Prespa | Rogachevo | Senokos | Sokolovo | Strazhitsa | Trigortsi | Tsarichino | Tsarkva | Zmeevo

=== Dobrich municipality (city) ===
Dobrich

=== Dobrichka municipality (rural) ===
Altsek | Batovo | Bdintsi | Benkovski | Bogdan | Bozhurovo | Branishte | Cherna | Debrene | Dobrevo | Dolina | Donchevo | Draganovo | Dryanovets | Enevo | Feldfebel Denkovo | General Kolevo | Geshanovo | Hitovo | Zhitnitsa | Kamen | Kamen Bryag | Karapelit | Kotlentsi | Kozloduytsi | Kragulevo | Lomnitsa | Lovchantsi | Lyaskovo | Malka Smolnitsa | Medovo | Metodievo | Miladinovtsi | Novo Botevo | Odrintsi | Odurtsi | Opanets | Orlova mogila | Ovcharovo | Paskalevo | Pchelino | Pchelnik | Plachi Dol | Pobeda | Podslon | Polkovnik Ivanovo | Polkovnik Minkovo | Polkovnik Sveshtarovo | Popgrigorovo | Prilep | Primortsi | Rosenovo | Samuilovo | Slaveevo | Sliventsi | Smolnitsa | Sokolnik | Stefan Karadzha | Stefanovo | Stozher | Svoboda | Tsarevets | Tyanevo | Vedrina | Vladimirovo | Vodnyantsi | Vrachantsi | Vratarite | Zlatia

=== General Toshevo municipality ===
Aleksandar Stamboliyski | Balkantsi | Bezhanovo | Chernookovo | Dabovik | General Toshevo | Goritsa | Gradini | Izvorovo | Zhiten | Kalina | Kapinovo | Kardam | Konare | Kraishte | Krasen | Loznitsa | Lyulyakovo | Malina | Ograzhden | Pchelarovo | Petleshkovo | Pisarovo | Plenimir | Preselentsi | Prisad | Ravnets | Rogozina | Rosen | Rositsa | Sarnino | Sirakovo | Snop | Snyagovo | Spasovo | Sredina | Uzovo | Vasilevo | Velikovo | Vichovo | Yovkovo | Zograf

=== Kavarna municipality ===
Belgun | Bilo | Bozhurets | Balgarevo | Chelopechene | Hadzhi Dimitar | Irechek | Kamen Bryag | Kavarna | Krupen | Mogilishte | Neykovo | Poruchik Chunchevo | Rakovski | Seltse | Septemvriytsi | Sveti Nikola | Topola | Travnik | Vidno | Vranino

=== Krushari municipality ===
Abrit | Aleksandria | Bistrets | Dobrin | Efreytor Bakalovo | Gaber | Kapitan Dimitrovo | Koriten | Krushari | Lozenets | Ognyanovo | Polkovnik Dyakovo | Poruchik Kurdjievo | Severnyak | Severtsi | Telerig | Zagortsi | Zementsi | Zimnitsa

=== Shabla municipality ===
Bozhanovo | Chernomortsi | Durankulak | Ezerets | Gorichane | Gorun | Granichar | Krapets | Prolez | Shabla | Smin | Staevtsi | Tvarditsa | Tyulenovo | Vaklino | Zahari Stoyanovo

=== Tervel municipality ===
Angelariy | Balik | Bezmer | Bozhan | Bonevo | Brestnitsa | Chestimensko | Glavantsi | Gradnitsa | Guslar | Kableshkovo | Kladentsi | Kochmar | Kolartsi | Mali izvor | Nova Kamena | Onogur | Orlyak | Polkovnik Savovo | Popgruevo | Profesor Zlatarski | Surnets | Tervel | Voynikovo | Zarnevo | Zheglartsi

== See also ==
- Provinces of Bulgaria
- Municipalities of Bulgaria
- List of cities and towns in Bulgaria
- List of villages in Dobrich Province
