= General Toshevo =

Town in Dobrich, Bulgaria

General Toshevo Генерал Тошево
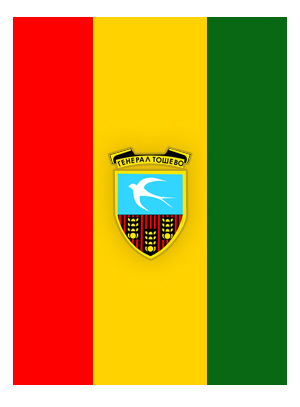
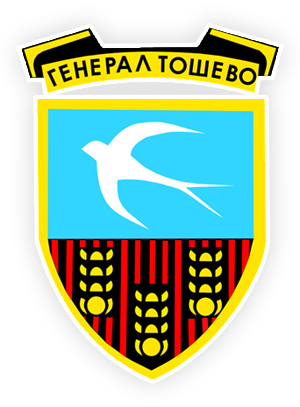
- Flag Coat of arms

- Location of General Toshevo
- Coordinates: 43°42′N 28°2′E
- Country: Bulgaria
- Provinces (Oblast): Dobrich

Government
  - Mayor: Valentin Dimitrov (BSP)
- Elevation: 230 m (750 ft)

Population (2009-12-31)
  - Total: 7,130
- Time zone: UTC+2 (EET)
  - Summer (DST): UTC+3 (EEST)
- Postal Code: 9500
- Area code: 05731
- License plate: TX
- Website: http://www.toshevo.org/

General Toshevo (Bulgarian: Генерал Тошево [ɡɛnɛˈraɫ ˈtɔʃɛvo]; Romanian: Casim) is a town in northeastern Bulgaria, part of Dobrich Province. Located in the historic region of Southern Dobruja, it is the administrative centre of the homonymous municipality and was named after the noted Bulgarian General Stefan Toshev. As of December 2009, the town had a population of 7,130.

== History ==
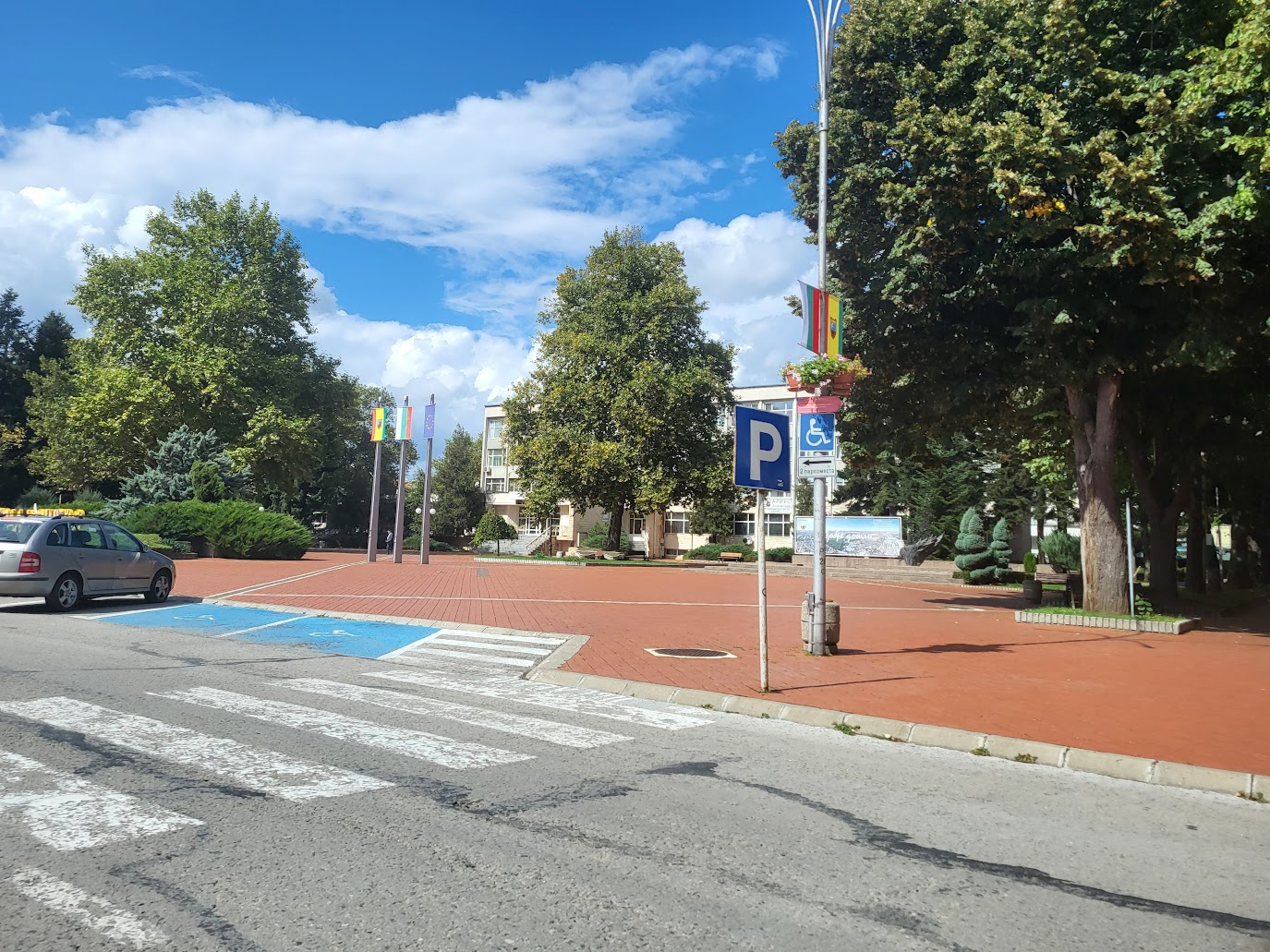
General Toshevo main square

What is today General Toshevo was first mentioned in Ottoman tax registers as Kasım in 1573; according to archaeological evidence, the area had been settled by Getae in antiquity, and then by the Ancient Romans. The surrounding region became part of the Bulgarian Empire after its establishment in 681 until it was conquered by the Ottomans in the late 14th century during the Bulgarian-Ottoman Wars. It remained under Ottoman rule until the Liberation of Bulgaria in 1878. Following the Second Balkan War, Bulgaria was forced to cede it to Romania along with all of Southern Dobruja. It was initially renamed to Sfântul Dumitru ("Saint Demetrius") in 1918 from Casim and then, in 1934, to Ion Gheorghe Duca in honour of the politician and Prime Minister of Romania assassinated by the Iron Guard the previous year. It was also a district (plasă) centre of Caliacra County under Romanian rule.

The village was ceded back to Bulgaria according to the Treaty of Craiova of 1940. It acquired its present name in 1942, and was declared a town in 1960.

There is a world-acknowledged Institute for Wheat and Sunflower established in 1951.

== Municipality ==
General Toshevo is the seat of a municipality of Dobrich Province, which includes the following 42 places:

- Aleksandar Stamboliyski
- Balkantsi
- Bezhanovo
- Chernookovo
- Dabovik
- General Toshevo
- Goritsa
- Gradini
- Izvorovo
- Kalina
- Kapinovo
- Kardam
- Konare
- Kraishte
- Krasen
- Loznitsa
- Lyulyakovo
- Malina
- Ograzhden
- Petleshkovo
- Pisarovo
- Plenimir
- Preselentsi
- Prisad
- Pchelarovo
- Ravnets
- Rogozina
- Rosen
- Rositsa
- Sarnino
- Sirakovo
- Snop
- Snyagovo
- Spasovo
- Sredina
- Uzovo
- Vasilevo
- Velikovo
- Vichovo
- Yovkovo
- Zhiten
- Zograf

== International relations ==
=== Twin towns — Sister cities ===
General Toshevo is twinned with:

- Bolgrad, Ukraine
- Mangalia, Romania
