= Dobrujan Arabs =

Arab ethnic group of Bulgaria and Romania

عرب دبروجة ‘Arab Dubrūja
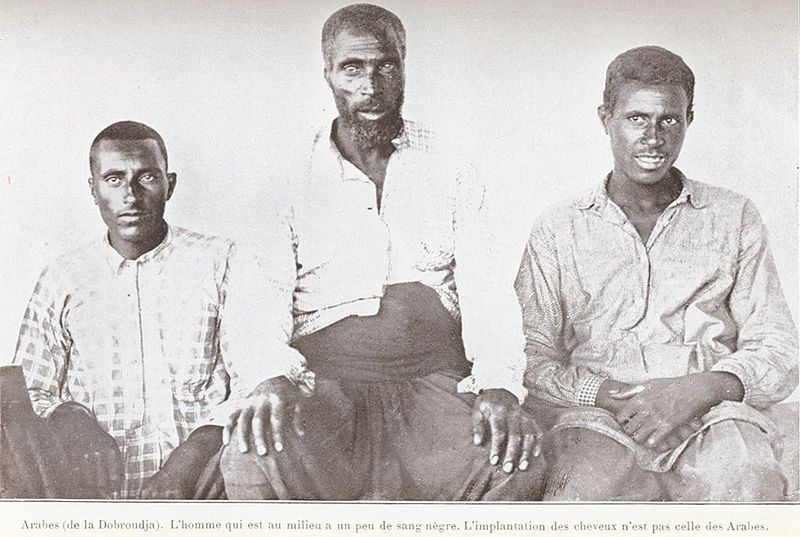
- Dobrujan Afro-Arab men, believed to be Sudanese, between 19th and 20th century

Languages
- Arabic, Crimean Tatar, Turkish

Religion
- Islam

Related ethnic groups
- Dobrujan Tatars, Dobrujan Turks, other Arabs, especially Syrian Arabs, Egyptian Arabs and Afro-Arabs

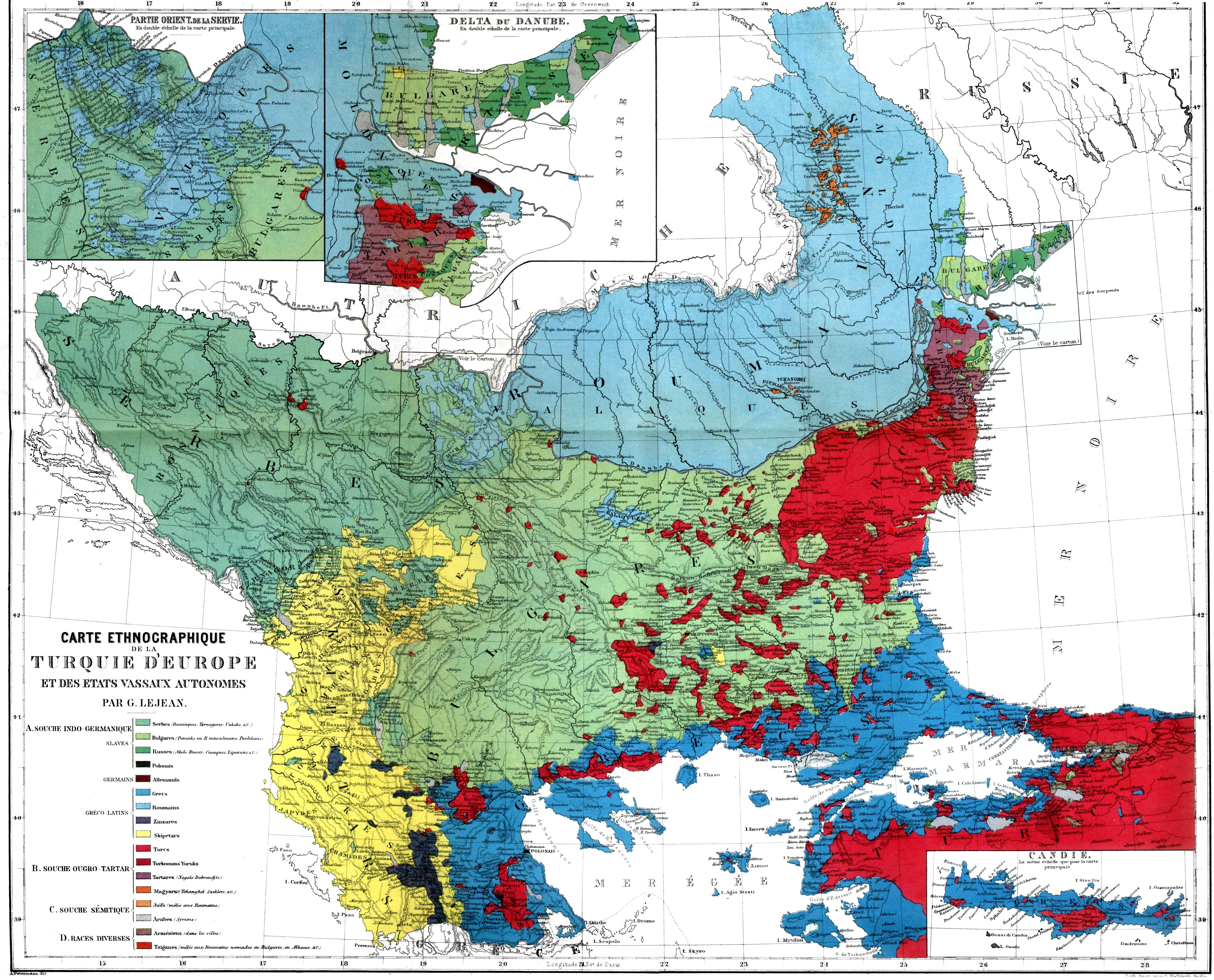
Balkan ethnic groups from 1861, Arabs (Syrians) are seen in the map

Dobrujan Arabs (Arabic: عرب دبروجة, romanized: ‘Arab Dubrūja) (Note: They are also known in Romanian as harapi pl. harapii, in Bulgarian as харап (harap) pl. харапци (haraptsi), meaning "Arab".) are Arab people who assimilated into the Tatar-Turkish population in Dobruja. They settled to Dobruja in the 19th century.

== History ==
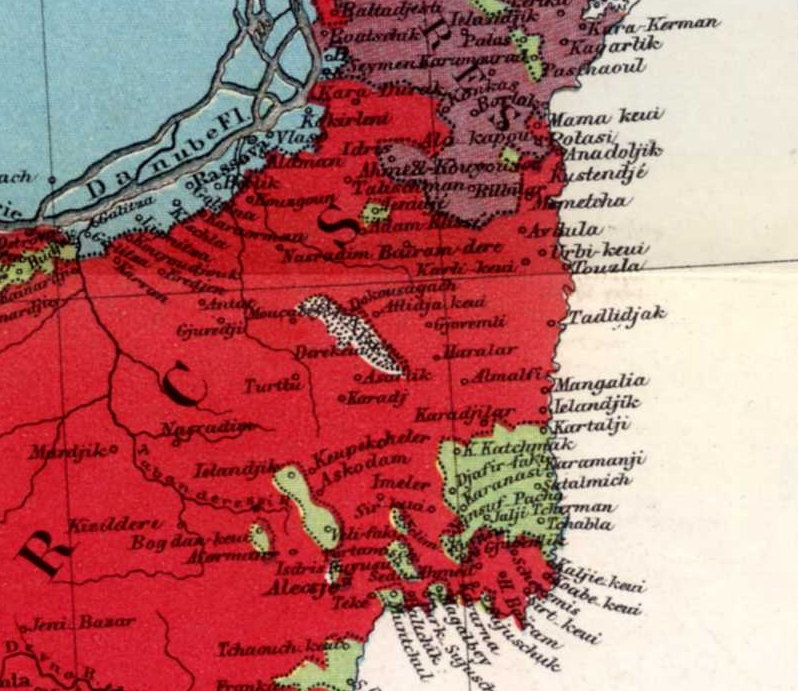
Fragment of the ethnic map of the Balkan Peninsula drawn up in 1861 by G. Lejean. The area inhabited by the Dobrogean Arabs is marked by a white space with black dots. (See caption)

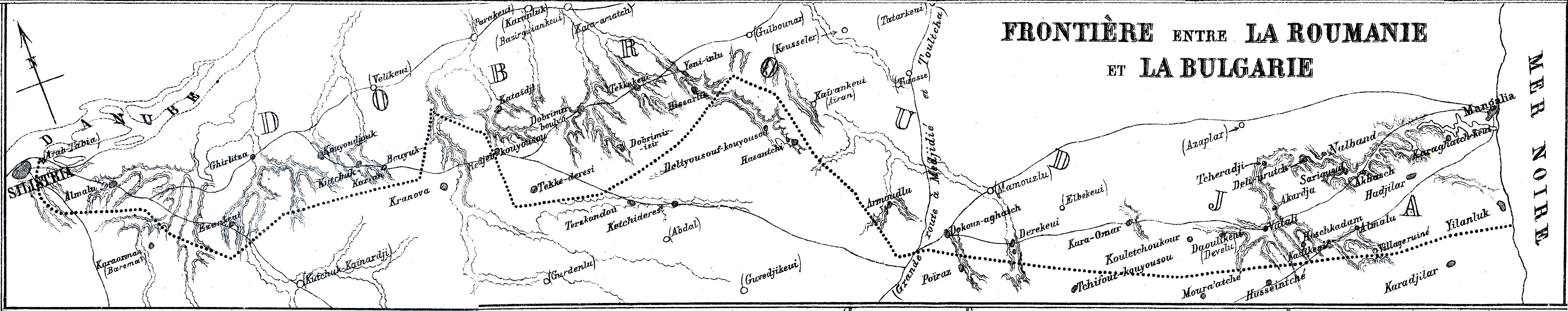
The Romanian-Bulgarian border from 1878 with the representation of the Dokuz Ağaç locality

These Arabs were known for their skills in marine (Turkish: donanma) and weaving (Turkish: dokuma), even known as "carpet weaver Arabs" (Turkish: Kilimci Araplar) or "sock weaver" (Turkish: Çorapçı) but also as "Fellah" (Arabic: فَلَّاح, romanized: fallāḥ, lit. 'farmer').

At the beginning they served in the military of Mehmet Ali Paşa, their names and military ranks were noticed in the Ottoman sources and were referred as Egyptian soldiers. But some of them deserted and crossed over to the Ottoman side and stayed in Syria. In 1839 the Ottomans brought them to Istanbul, where they worked in Kilimhane (carpet factory) to meet the army's needs, it was a military institution and therefore defined as company. They stayed in Laleli, the factory was in Kadırga Port. When the factory closed, they were jobless, and due to Ottoman policy (according to the law, it was not possible to stay in Istanbul without working) they were brought to Dobruja by the Ottomans in 1843. (Note: While some sources claim the date 1831-1833 (at the time of Mahmud II). Other sources include the fact that alongside with Arabs also Kurds and Persians were brought to Dobruja. Some of the sources also grouped the Arabs as "Fellah", or "Egyptian", or "Syrians", or "Fellah and Syrians", or "Egyptians and Syrians" or "Sudanese", with population of 145 families.) They did arrive in Balchik, the population was 255 hane "family". (Note: According to Abdullah Saydam they were 558 Arabs, literally 170 families. The families were divided into villages as follow: Connected to Pazarcık (Dobrich): İlbey 18, Aydınbey 9, Oğuzlar 12, Dokuzağaç 21, Poyraz 27, Musabey 24. Connected to Yemşinli: Çalmarça 24, Bayramdede 35.) In Dobruja they worked as farmers. According to Ottoman sources, these people were housed in some towns in Dobruja, with generous state support.

The Arabs were highly valued for their skill in practicing agriculture in drought conditions. The territory on which they settled is crossed today by the Romanian-Bulgarian border. Of the five settlements, the most important was Dokuz Ağaç ("Nine trees"), today Măgura, a village in Cerchezu Commune, Constanța County, Romania. They were the only Arab settlements in Europe. In 1850, 145 Arabs were recorded in Dobrogea (143 in Dobrich and 2 in Balchik), but their number increased significantly after this date. In 1861, French geographer Guillaume Lejean mentioned the fact that during his trip through the Balkan Peninsula in 1854, one of these settlements, Arap-Köy, was already abandoned, while the rest of the settlements enjoyed some prosperity. In 1869 the Arab population was 500 in Dobrogea and in 1871 the population of Arabs in European part of Ottoman Empire was 2000. In 1878, Dobrogea was divided between Romania and Bulgaria, and the new border crossed the area inhabited by Arabs. After this date, the Arab settlements began to decline, and part of the population emigrated to the Ottoman Empire.

A few decades later, in 1913, the Swiss anthropologist Eugène Pittard mentions that these colonies have dissolved and manages to find only a remnant of 14 unassimilated Arabs in the area, all men. Following anthropological analyses, Pittard concluded that some of them had Negroid racial influences and relates this situation to the fact that the Arab population around the Red Sea often shows Negroid racial influences, as a consequence of the African slave trade practiced there in the past and their assimilation by the majority Arab population. Pittard concludes that it is very possible that some of the Dobrujan Arabs have ancestors originating from this area.

In World War I, during planning of an attack on the Suez Canal, Ottoman military records noted that "there were two other volunteer groups made up of Turks, Syrian Arabs, Albanians and others from Romania".

The Dobrujan Arabs were not the only African population to have historically resided in Romania. In autumn 1916 the Central Powers took control of the Romanian regions Muntenia and Oltenia under control, and, in March 1917, they brought in some 3000 black prisoners of war from North West and Central Africa as well as from India for hard work in camps located in the Wallachian Plain. There were four camps: Slobozia (Ialomița), Morile Mărculești, Mănăstirea (județ Călărași) and Turnu Măgurele.

In Dokuz Ağaç (Măgura) the community noticed that the black people, which did live in a village called Periş (between Măgura and Olteni), did leave the village after World War I.

=== pre 19th century ===
Also before 19th century Arabs were in Dobruja, specially from Medina and Mekka.

== List of villages ==
Ottoman Turkish name	Current name	Arab families in 1843
İlbey	(Bulgaria) Pchelarovo	27
Musa Bey	(Bulgaria) Izvorovo	34
Kara İlyas	(Bulgaria) Tsarevets	2
Dokuz Ağaç	(Romania) Măgura, Cerchezu	31
Poyraz	(Bulgaria) deserted, northwest of Ograzhden	39
Aydın Bey	(Bulgaria) Svetlik, merged with Kapinovo	14
Oğuzlar	(Bulgaria) Uzovo	19
Çalmarça	(Romania) Căciulați, merged with Olteni, Independența	39
Bayram Dede	(Romania) Independența	50

== Origin ==
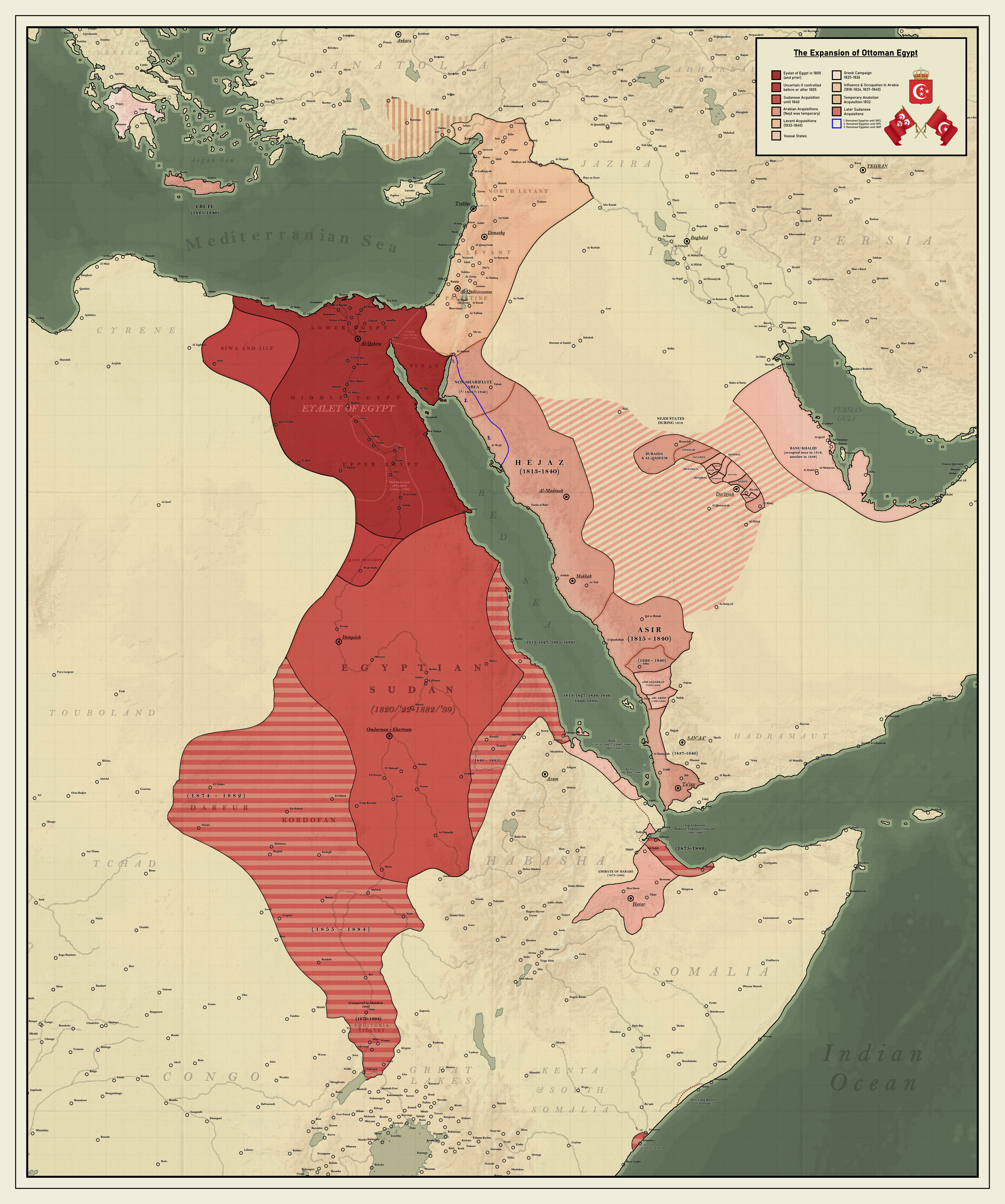
Ottoman Egypt under Mehmet Ali Pasha

The Dobrujan Arabs are actually different groups, like Egyptians, also people around Red Sea (Turco-Egyptian Sudan [today's Sudan and Eritrea] and Ottoman Hejaz/Tihamah [today's Saudi Arabia and Yemen]), and Syrians (literally those from Ottoman Syria, includes also Lebanon, Jordan and Palestine).

== Culture ==
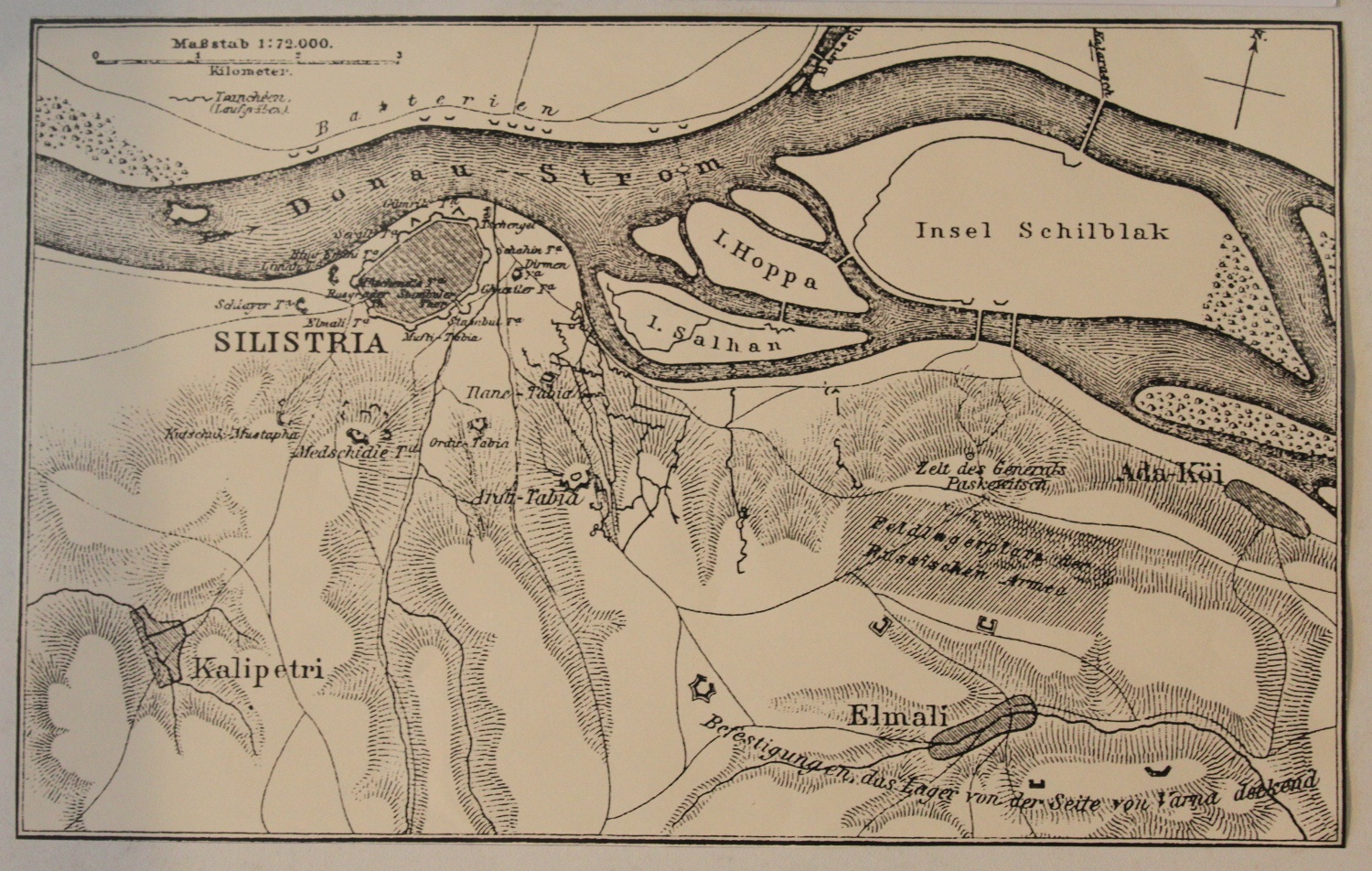
The Silistra fortress system (Arab Tabia is in the center)

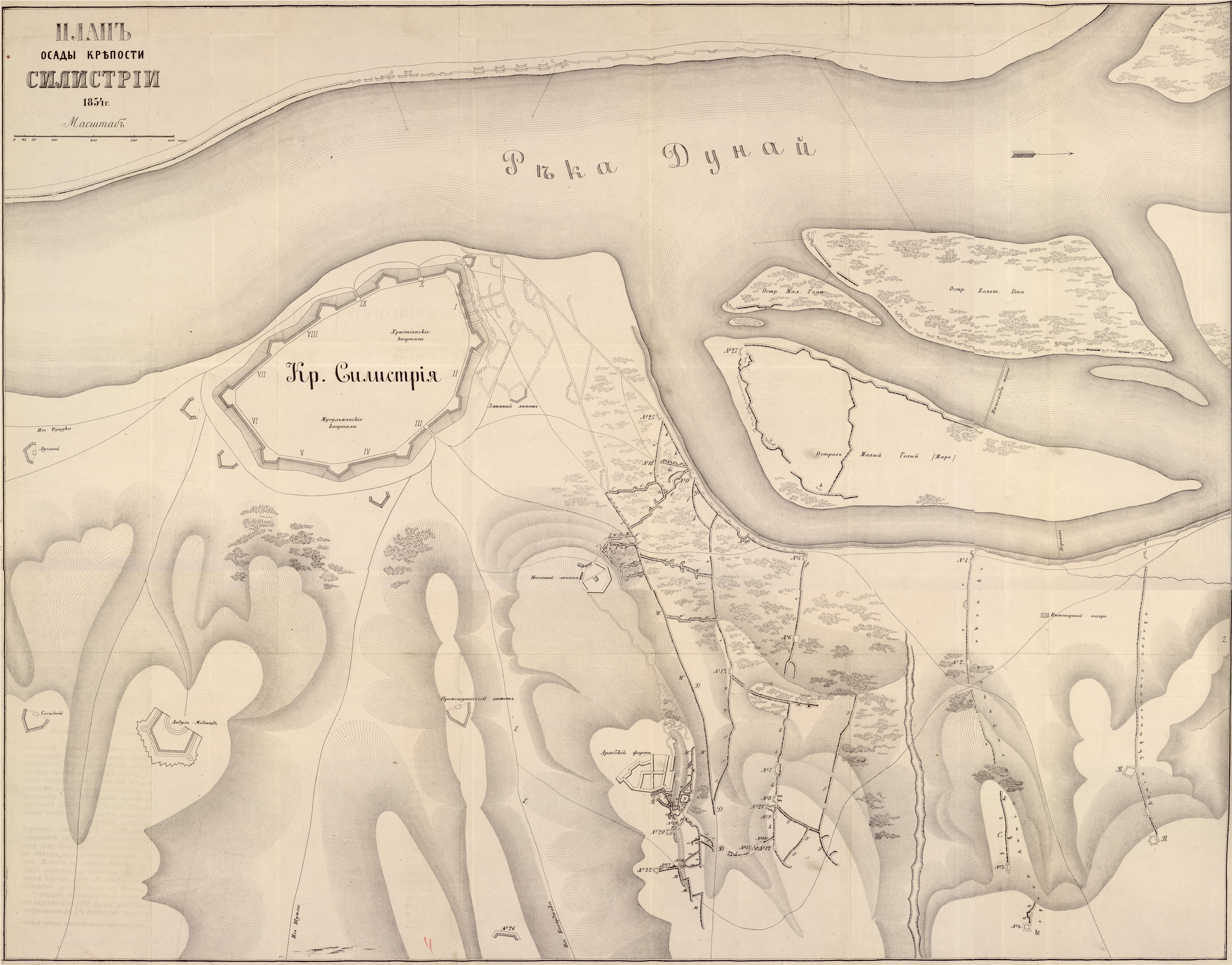
The Siege of Silistra, 1854 (Arab Tabia is in the bottom center)

Many Arab soldiers served in Arab Tabia (meaning "Arab Redoubt"), which was a fortress in Constanța County, Romania, located 1 km southeast of the outskirts of Silistra, and 5 km west of the municipal center, the village of Ostrov. Today there is the Arab Tabia Hill.

Dobrujan Arabs greatly influenced the local people. They appear in songs, poems, fairy tales, and idioms, such as the image of a black man guarding a treasure.

In 1788 a fountain was built by Seyyid Arap İsmail Alemdar in Balchik called Arap Alemdar Çeşmesi, in 1866 it was rebuilt by Molla İmişzâde (Emişzâde) Said.

== Sources ==
- Mohammed Binzouba, Majed (2024). "19. Yüzyıl Osmanlı Coğrafyasında Bir İskân Örneği: Dobruca'da Arap Köyleri". Osmanlı Araştırmaları/ The Journal of Ottoman Studies (in Turkish and English).
- Saydam, Abdullah (2014). "Tanzimat Devrinde Dobruca'da İskân Faaliyetleri" (in Turkish). pp. 203–205.
- Grigore, George (1999). "George Grigore. "Muslims in Romania", ISIM Newsletter (International Institute for the Study of Islam in the Modern World) no. 3, Leiden. 1999: 34".
- Pittard, Eugène (1913). Contribution à l'étude anthropologique des arabes. Le Globe.
- Debelak, Julius (1882). Das Osmanische Reich und die Balkan-Staaten nach dem Berliner Congresse vom militärischen Gesichtspunkte aus beleuchted (in German). p. 7.
- Kaiserlich-Königliche Geographische Gesellschaft (1878). Mitteilungen der Kaiserlich-Königlichen Geographischen Gesellschaft (in German). Vol. 21. Vienna. p. 180.
- Klöden, Gustav Adolph von (1877). Handbuch der Länder- und Staatenkunde von Europa: Die Staaten von Nord-, Ost-, Süd- und West-Europa (in German). p. 709.
- Die Grenzboten (Zeitschrift für Politik, Literatur und Kunst) (in German). 1877. p. 239.
- Marées, G. von (1876). Monatshefte für Politik und Wehrmacht [auch Organ der Gesellschaft für Heereskunde] (in German). Vol. 21. Berlin. p. 215.
- Ungewitter, Friedrich H. (1873). F. H. Ungewitters neueste Erdbeschreibung und Staatenkunde (Geographisch statistisch-historisches Handbuch) (in German). Vol. 2. p. 232.
- Schneider, K. F. Robert (1871). Handbuch der Erdbeschreibung und Staatenkunde (in German). Vol. 1. p. 546.
- Österreichische Geographische Gesellschaft (1869). Mitteilungen (in German). Vol. 12. Vienna. p. 458 & 466.
- Lejean, Guillaume (1861). Ethnographie de la Turquie d'Europe. Petermanns Geographischen Mitteilungen.
