= Prisad =

Prisad may refer to:

== Places ==
=== Bulgaria ===
- Prisad, Dobrich Province
- Prisad, Burgas Province

=== North Macedonia ===
- Prisad, North Macedonia
- Stari Prisad, the older village of Prisad, now abandoned.

== Other ==
- Prisad Island, island off the north coast of Low Island in the South Shetland Islands
