= Sirakovo, Dobrich Province =

Sirakovo
- Village
- Location in Bulgaria
- Coordinates: 43.652°N 28.268°E
- Country: Bulgaria
- Province: Dobrich Province
- Municipality: General Toshevo Municipality

Area
  - Total: 21,165 km^{2} (8,172 sq mi)
- Elevation: 100 m (330 ft)

Population (2010)
  - Total: 92
- Time zone: UTC+2 (EET)
  - Summer (DST): UTC+3 (EEST)

Sirakovo is a village in General Toshevo Municipality, Dobrich Province, in northeastern Bulgaria.

== Characteristics ==
The only office building is located in the village center. Here are housed the town hall and general store. Earlier there was a pub, called "Horemag", bakery and barber shop are closed a long time ago. Sirakovo residents are about a hundred. About 50 houses are in Sirakovo, 10 of them are inhabited. As in neighboring villages Velikovo and Sarnino where purchased English estate, foreigners started to show interest in Sirakovo. As a feature could be added to the poor condition of road network, which is the main reason for the exodus of young people and the lack of foreigners. In recent years settled in the village and the Roma families, who came with their numerous children to seek work as a shepherds, cowmen. But due to lack of work in the village, their number has decreased dramatically at the beginning of 2010. From 2009 in the village has purchased properties from 2 English and a German family. In May 2009 it was refurbished road from Preselentsi to Spasovo which locals regarded as an incredible event.

== History ==
Information on the history of the village is scarce. In one book, historian Georgi Topalov noted that the settlement Etimele (old name of Sirakovo) is mentioned in the Turkish record of the 16th century. Most of today's residents are immigrants from Tulcea, Romania villages Lower Chamurla / Ceamurlia de Jos / Avian flu Chamurliya December Jos / Iseki and Cesme. When immigrants arrived here, found a local farm and several Romanian Tzinzar houses which were accommodated. Kutsovlasi addition, in 1941 the village had several Bulgarian family. One of the local landlords - Bratyanu provide a livelihood for a military regiment from Bucharest. Bulgarians also were wealthy people. One of them - Vassil Valkov, owned several shops in Constanța. The school in Sirakovo was built in 1946 in the beginning there was even a junior high classes. It has long been closed. The building, which was municipal property was purchased by locals and turned into a house. Church in the village never had. In the early 1940s Romanian colonists had intended to erect a church, but after the return of Southern Dobrudja to Bulgaria dropped the idea. To stay here emigrants had more pressing task - to build houses and settle their lives to the new location. After the establishment of the communist regime in 1944 the building of the church is unthinkable. About a kilometer or two from Sirakovo has remained closed in 1955 Krushovo village. There was no more than 20 houses. Waters are to be administratively Sirakovo mayoralty. In the 40 years of the 20th century and was rich Krushovo chiflikchii. Have functioned barbershop and a cafeteria. After 1945 he was interned Krushovo Velichko Barev - Agrarian activist. After closure of the village, he moved with his family in Spasovo.
