= Constanța County =

County of Romania

Constanța County Județul Constanța
- County
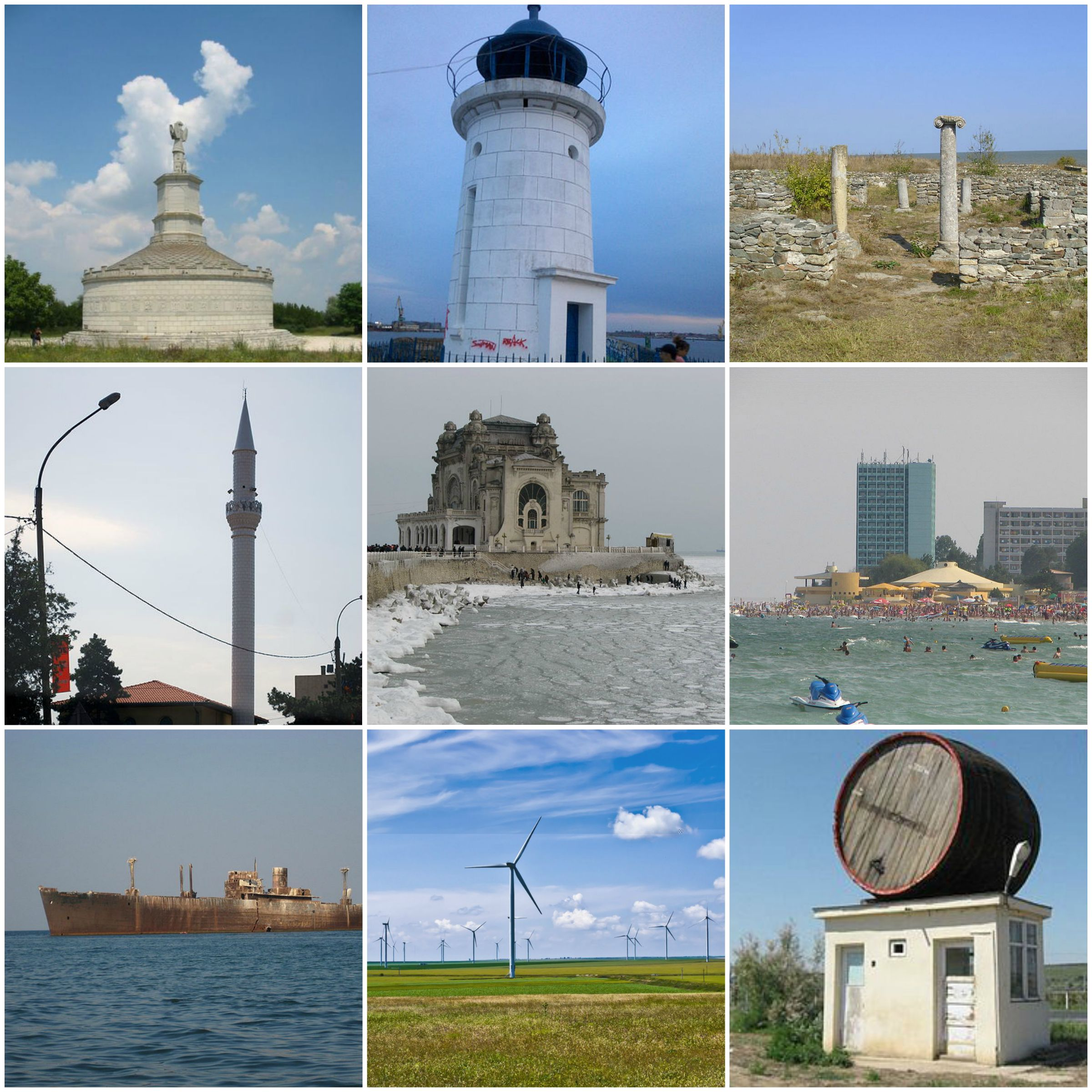

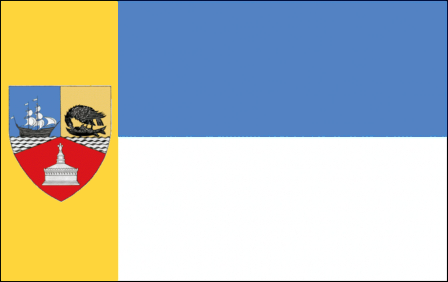
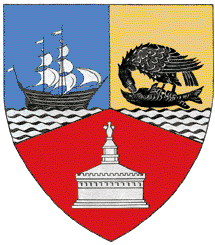
- Flag Coat of arms

- Coordinates: 44.27°N 28.31°E
- Country: Romania
- Development region^{1}: Sud-Est
- Historic region: Northern Dobruja
- Capital city (Reședință de județ): Constanța

Government
  - Type: County Council
  - President of the County Council: Florin Mitroi (PNL)
  - Prefect: Silviu-Iulian COȘA

Area
  - Total: 7,104 km^{2} (2,743 sq mi)
  - Rank: 8th in Romania

Population (2021-12-01)
  - Total: 655,997
  - Rank: 5th in Romania
  - Density: 92.34/km^{2} (239.2/sq mi)
- Time zone: UTC+2 (EET)
  - Summer (DST): UTC+3 (EEST)
- Postal Code: 90wxyz^{3}
- Area code: +40 x41^{4}
- ISO 3166 code: RO-CT
- Car Plates: CT^{5}
- GDP nominal: US$14.640 billion (2024)
- GDP per capita: US$22,351 (2024)
- Economy rank: 3rd
- Website: County Board; County Prefecture
- ^{1}The development regions of Romania have no administrative role. They were formed just to attract funds from the European Union^{2} as of 2007, the Prefect is not a politician, but a public official. He or she is not allowed to be a member of a political party and is forbidden from political activity in the first six months after the resignation (or exclusion) from the ranks of public officials^{3}w, x, y, and z are digits that indicate the city, the street, part of the street, or even the building of the address^{4}x is a digit indicating the operator: 2 for the former national operator, Romtelecom, and 3 for the other ground telephone networks^{5}used on both the plates of the vehicles that operate only in the county limits (like utility vehicles, ATVs, etc.), and the ones used outside the county

Constanța (Romanian pronunciation: [konˈstantsa]) is a county (județ) of Romania on the border with Bulgaria, in the Northern Dobruja region. Its capital city is also named Constanța.

== Demographics ==
In 2021, it had a population of 655,997 and the population density was 92/km^{2}. The degree of urbanization is much higher (about 75%) than the Romanian average. In recent years the population trend is:

Year	County population
1948	311,062
1956	369,940 ▲
1966	465,752 ▲
1977	608,817 ▲
1992	748,044 ▲
2002	715,151 ▼
2011	684,082 ▼
2021	655,997 ▼

The majority of the population are Orthodox Romanians. There are important communities of Muslim Turks and Tatars, remnants of the time of Ottoman rule. Currently the region is the centre of the Muslim minority in Romania. A great number of Aromanians have migrated to Dobruja in the last century, and they consider themselves a cultural minority rather than an ethnic minority. There are also Romani.

Ethnicity	1880	2002	2011	2021
Total	64,902	715,151	630,679	655,997
Romanian	14,884 (23%)	652,777 (91%)	570,754 (83.43%)	504,344 (76.88%)
Tatar	22,854 (35%)	23,230 (3.2%)	19,601 (2.87%)	16,918 (2.58%)
Turkish	14,947 (23%)	24,246 (3.4%)	20,826 (3.04%)	16,121 (2.46%)
Roma	<100 (<0.1%)	6,023 (0.84%)	8,554 (1.25%)	6,593 (1.01%)
Lipovan		5,273 (0.74%)	3,568 (0.52%)	4,084 (0.62%)
Hungarian		921 (0.13%)	450 (0.07%)	313 (0.05%)
Greek	2,607 (4%)	590 (0.08%)	266 (0.04%)	232 (0.04%)
Bulgarian	7,919 (12%)	74 (0.01%)	35 (0.01%)	72 (0.01%)
Others		2,017 (0.28%)	6,625 (1.05%)	107,320 (16.35%)

== Geography ==
- Călărași County and Ialomița County are to the west.
- Tulcea County and Brăila County are to the north.
- Bulgaria (Dobrich Province and Silistra Province) are to the south.

== Economy ==

The predominant industries in the county are:

- Tourism
- Chemicals and petrochemicals
- Food and beverages
- Textiles
- Shipbuilding
- Construction materials
- Mechanical components
- Paper

Agriculture is an important part in the county's economy, with Constanța being the county with the largest irrigation systems in the country (more than 4,300 km^{2} before 1989, now greatly reduced), cereals being the most important products. Also, the county is famous for its wines from the Murfatlar region.

At Cernavodă there is a nuclear power plant with two reactors, each of the CANDU type of Canadian design. The plant covers over 15% of the country's power demand.

The Port of Constanța is the largest port in Romania, the most important of the Black Sea and the 4th in Europe. It is linked with the Danube by the Danube-Black Sea Canal – the widest and deepest navigable channel in Europe, although it is not used to its full potential.

== Tourism ==
The Romanian Riviera along the coast of the Black Sea is the preferred destination for the summer holidays in Romania. The resorts are, from North to South:

- Năvodari
- Mamaia
- Eforie (North and South)
- Costinești
- Olimp
- Neptun
- Jupiter
- Cap Aurora
- Venus
- Saturn
- Mangalia
- 2 Mai
- Vama Veche

Also worth visiting are:

- The city of Constanța
- The mausoleum at Adamclisi
- The Portița area

== Politics ==
The elected President of the County Council is Florin Mitroi from PNL. In addition, in the wake of the 2024 Romanian local elections, the current Constanța County Council consists of 36 councilors, with the following party composition:

Party	Seats	Current County Council
National Liberal Party (PNL)	15	
Social Democratic Party (PSD)	10	
Alliance for the Union of Romanians (AUR)	6	
United Right Alliance (ADU)	5	

== Administrative divisions ==
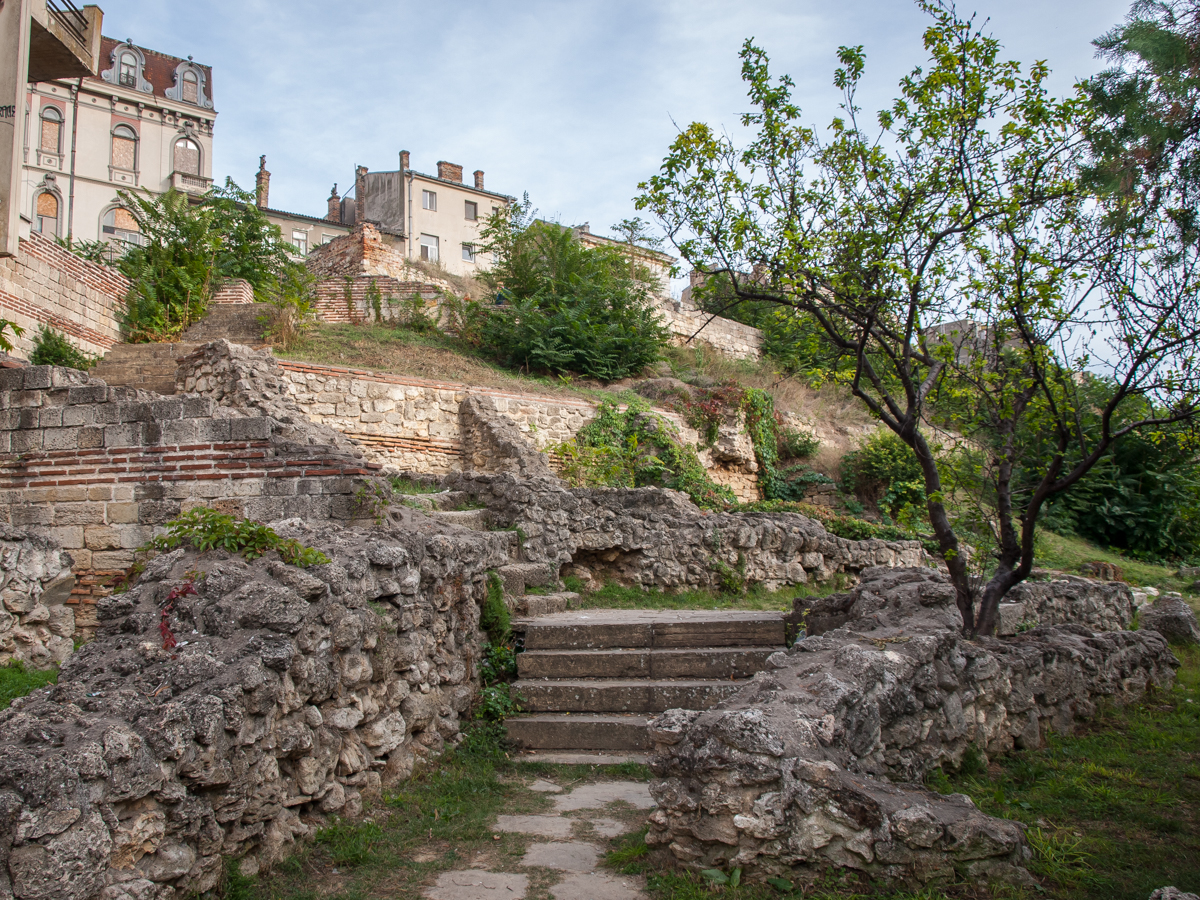
Ruins of Tomis

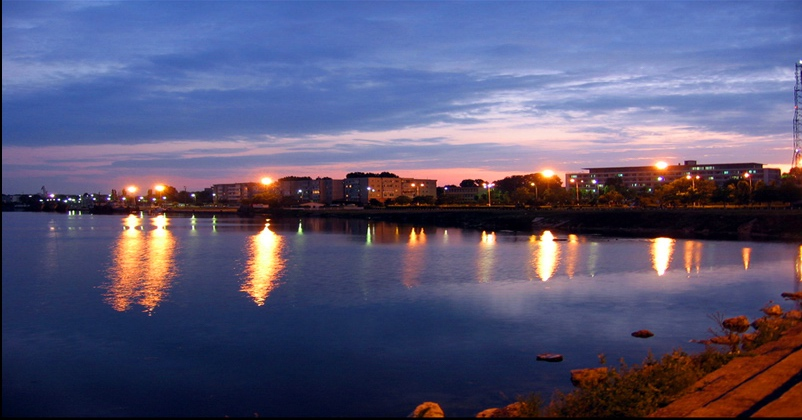
Port of Mangalia

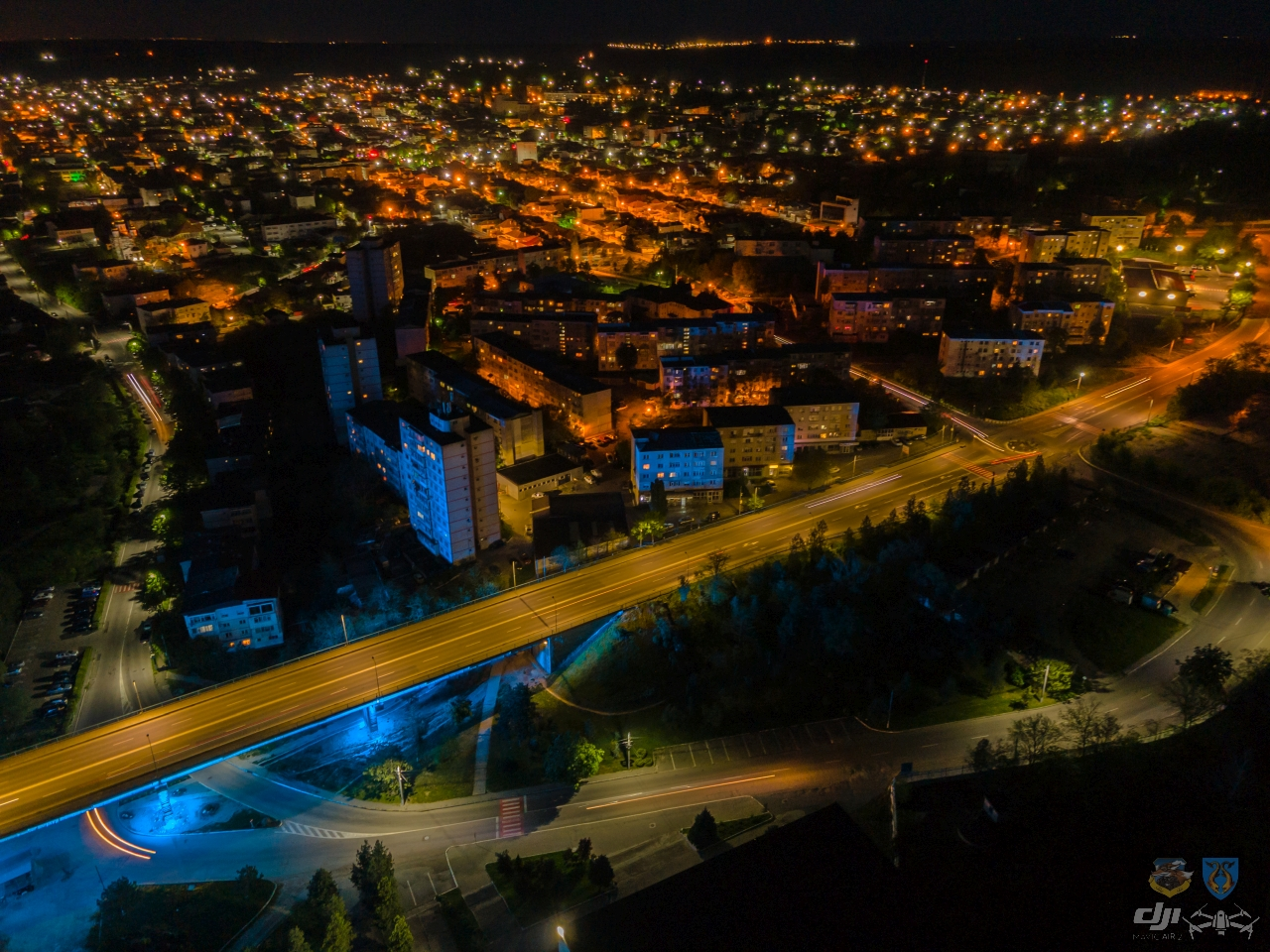
Medgidia

Constanța County has 3 municipalities, 9 towns and 58 communes:

- Municipalities
  - Constanța – capital city; population: 283,872 (as of 2011)
  - Mangalia
  - Medgidia
- Towns
  - Cernavodă
  - Eforie
  - Hârșova
  - Murfatlar
  - Năvodari
  - Negru Vodă
  - Ovidiu
  - Techirghiol
- Communes
  - 23 August
  - Adamclisi
  - Agigea
  - Albești
  - Aliman
  - Amzacea
  - Băneasa (town between 2004 and 2019)
  - Bărăganu
  - Castelu
  - Cerchezu
  - Chirnogeni
  - Ciobanu
  - Ciocârlia
  - Cobadin
  - Cogealac
  - Comana
  - Corbu
  - Costinești
  - Crucea
  - Cumpăna
  - Cuza Vodă
  - Deleni
  - Dobromir
  - Dumbrăveni
  - Fântânele
  - Gârliciu
  - Ghindărești
  - Grădina
  - Horia
  - Independența
  - Ion Corvin
  - Istria
  - Limanu
  - Lipnița
  - Lumina
  - Mereni
  - Mihai Viteazu
  - Mihail Kogălniceanu
  - Mircea Vodă
  - Nicolae Bălcescu
  - Oltina
  - Ostrov
  - Pantelimon
  - Pecineaga
  - Peștera
  - Poarta Albă
  - Rasova
  - Saligny
  - Saraiu
  - Săcele
  - Seimeni
  - Siliștea
  - Târguşor
  - Topalu
  - Topraisar
  - Tortoman
  - Tuzla
  - Valu lui Traian
  - Vulturu

== Historical county ==
Județul Constanța
- County (Județ)
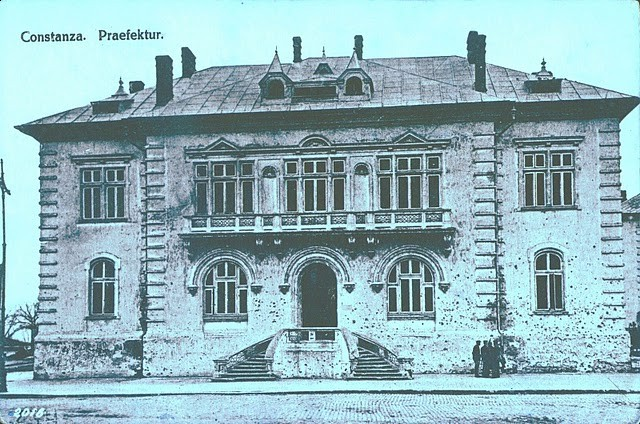
- The Constanța County Prefect's building (1906–1949), currently used as headquarters of the Constanța military district

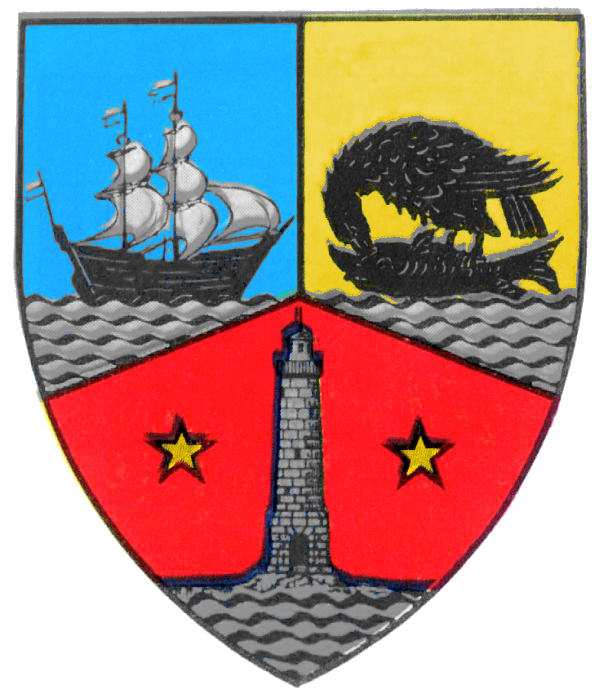
- Coat of arms

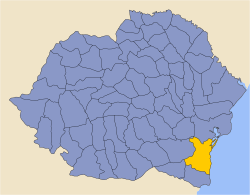
- Country: Romania
- Historic region: Dobruja
- Capital city (Reședință de județ): Constanța
- Established: 1879
- Ceased to exist: Administrative reform of 1950

Area
  - Total: 6,916 km^{2} (2,670 sq mi)

Population (1930)
  - Total: 253,093
  - Density: 36.60/km^{2} (94.78/sq mi)
- Time zone: UTC+2 (EET)
  - Summer (DST): UTC+3 (EEST)

Following the 1926 administrative reform, the borders of the historical county are identical to the ones of the current Constanța County, with the exception of the Ostrov and Lipnița communes, which were then administered by the Durostor County, the Baia commune, now part of Tulcea County, and the villages of Tereskondu, Pârâul Caprei, Fundeni, Pădureni, Saldu Alde and Enigea-Haidar, now in Bulgaria.

=== Geography ===
The county neighboured the Black Sea to the east, the counties of Tulcea and Brăila to the north, Ialomița to the west, Durostor to the south-west and Caliacra to the south.

=== Administration ===
The county originally consisted of four districts (plăși):

1. Plasa Dunărea
2. Plasa Mangalia
3. Plasa Ovidiu
4. Plasa Traian

Subsequently, the territory of the county was reorganized into seven districts:

1. Plasa Cernavodă, headquartered in Cernavodă
2. Plasa Dunărea, headquartered in Hârșova
3. Plasa Ferdinand, headquartered in Constanța
4. Plasa Mangalia, headquartered in Mangalia
5. Plasa Negru-Vodă, headquartered in Negru Vodă
6. Plasa Traian, headquartered in Ion Corvin
7. Plasa Medgidia, headquartered in Medgidia

On the territory of Constanta County there were seven urban localities: Constanţa (with city status) and the urban communes of Carmen-Sylva, Techirghiol, Mangalia, Medgidia, Cernavodă and Hârșova.

=== After 1938 ===
After the 1938 Administrative and Constitutional Reform, this county merged with the counties of Ialomița, Durostor and Caliacra to form Ținutul Mării. It was re-established in 1940 after the fall of Carol II's regime. Ten years later, it was abolished by the Communist regime.

=== Population ===
According to the census data of 1930, the county's population was 253,093 inhabitants, of which 66.2% were Romanians, 8.9% Bulgarians, 6.8% Turks, 6.0% Tatars, 3.8% Germans, 1.8% Greeks, 1.5% Russians, 1.3% Armenians, as well as other minorities. In religion, the population consisted of 78.9% Eastern Orthodox, 13.1% Islam, 2.5% Lutheran, 1.8% Roman Catholics, as well as other minorities.

==== Urban population ====
In 1930, the urban population of the county was 81,631 inhabitants, 68.7% Romanians, 7.3% Turks, 5.2% Greeks, 3.9% Armenians, 2.5% Germans, 2.2% Jews, 2.0% Tatars, 2.0% Bulgarians, 1.7% Russians, 1.7% Hungarians, as well as other minorities. Among the urban population, mother tongues were reported to be Romanian (72.0%), Turkish (9.7%), Greek (4.5%), Armenian (3.6%), German (2.4%), as well as other minorities. From the religious point of view, the urban population was composed mostly of Eastern Orthodox (78.4%), followed by Muslim (9.6%), Armenian Apostolic (3.3%), Roman Catholic (2.7%), Jewish (2.3%), Lutheran (1.6%), as well as other minorities.
