= Danail Papazov =

Minister of Transport, Information Technology and Communications of Bulgaria
- In office 29 May 2013 – 6 August 2014
- Prime Minister: Plamen Oresharski
- Preceded by: Kristian Krastev
- Succeeded by: Nikolina Angelkova

Personal details
- Born: 23 February 1959 (age 67) Dobrich, General Toshevo Municipality, Dobrich Province, Bulgaria
- Party: Bulgarian Socialist Party (2003-2014) Independent (2014-present)
- Profession: Engineer, Politician

Danail Papazov (Bulgarian: Данаил Папазов) is a Bulgarian politician and former Minister of Transport, Information Technology and Communications of Bulgaria.

== Biography ==
Danail Papazov was born on 23 February 1959 in the village of Dobrich, General Toshevo Municipality, Dobrich Province.

He graduated the Naval Academy "Nikola Vaptsarov" in Varna with subject "Navigation" and then took a master's degree as an "Engineer Navigator". Later he graduated "Business Administration" at the New Bulgarian University. He specialized in London and Hamburg.

In 1994-1997, he was deputy director in "Bulyunion Bulgaria". Between 1997 and 2001 he was captain bunkers. Since 2001 he has been CEO and member of the Board of Directors of "Port of Varna" EAD.

From 29 May 2013 to 6 August 2014 he was Minister of Transport, Information Technology and Communications of Bulgaria.
