= Dora Gabe =

Bulgarian poet and writer

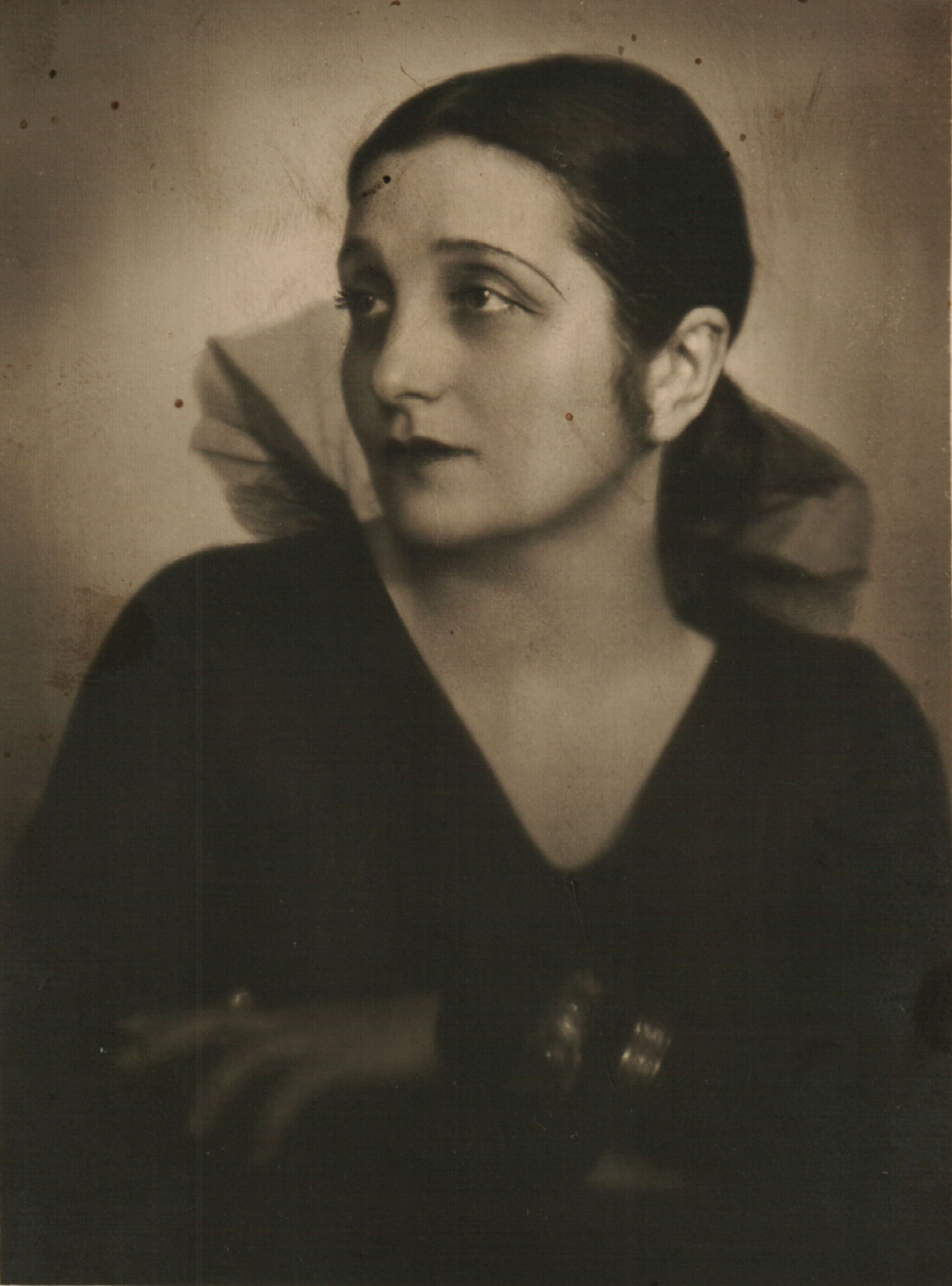
- Dora Gabe in 1931
- Born: 16 August 1888; Dabovik, Bulgaria
- Died: 16 November 1983 (aged 95); Sofia, Bulgaria
- Education: Sofia University; University of Grenoble; University of Geneva
- Occupation: Poet
- Writing career
- Language: Bulgarian
- Genre: Poetry

Dora Petrova Gabe (in Bulgarian: Дора Петрова Габе) (born Isidora Petrova Peysakh, 16 August 1888 – 16 November 1983) was а Bulgarian Jewish poet, writer and translator. She published poetry for adults and children as well as travel books, short stories and essays. In her later years, she also did extensive work in translation.

She is widely regarded as one of the most famous Bulgarian poets and is decorated with honors and awards indicating local respect from her home country.

== Biography ==
Born in 1886, in a country that had recently freed itself from Ottoman rule, Dora Gabe came from a family of Jewish immigrants from Ukraine. She was the daughter of Peter Gabe who became the first Jew to be elected to the Bulgarian National Assembly. When he was barred from taking office, he turned to journalism and became a well known public figure in Bulgaria.

Dora Gabe attended high school in Varna, and then pursued a degree in Natural Sciences at Sofia University (1904). Later, she studied French Philology in Geneva and Grenoble (1905–1906).

Back in Bulgaria, she taught French in Dobrich in 1907 and also began to publish poems in various journals. A quiet nostalgia emanates from her works, which are dedicated to sentimental and intimate themes, but also partly to the region of her childhood, Dobruja, a land disputed between Bulgaria and Romania.

From 1911 to 1932, she lived abroad again, in Poland, Germany, Switzerland, Austria, Czechoslovakia, France, and the United Kingdom with her husband, the professor and literary critic Boyan Penev. In 1923, they separated for good but did not divorce. He reportedly had affairs and pressured her to give up her own writing to devote herself to translation. They parted ways well before his death in 1927. Reflecting on her marriage, Dora was deeply critical: "My marriage to Boyan Penev (...) drew me deeper into his pursuits. While his influence enriched me, it came at the cost of my own identity. I stopped living my own inner life and instead lived his. Sadly, I only found the space to truly flourish after his death.".

In the 1920s and 1930s, she gave numerous lectures on political and cultural issues such as the development of Bulgarian literature and the fate of the Dobruja region. In 1925, the Ministry of Education in Bulgaria assigned Dora Gabe to edit the series Библиотека за най-малките (Library for the youngest). She also served as editor of the children's magazine Window (1939–1941). She was as well one of the founders of the Bulgarian-Polish Committee (1922) and the Bulgarian PEN Club (1927). She served as a longtime president for the latter.

In Bulgaria, the political situation was very unstable during the interwar period. The alliance with Nazi Germany during World War II led to a conflict with the Soviet Union, followed by a communist coup in 1944. She could not escape the constraints imposed on the literary world by the new Bulgarian regime and published a collection in 1946, Vela, praising the communist partisans.

From 1947 to 1950, she was counselor for cultural affairs at the Bulgarian Embassy in Warsaw.

Subsequently, she continued writing, focusing on more intimate concerns.

She died on November 16th, 1983 at the age of 95, in Sofia, Bulgaria.

== Literary career ==
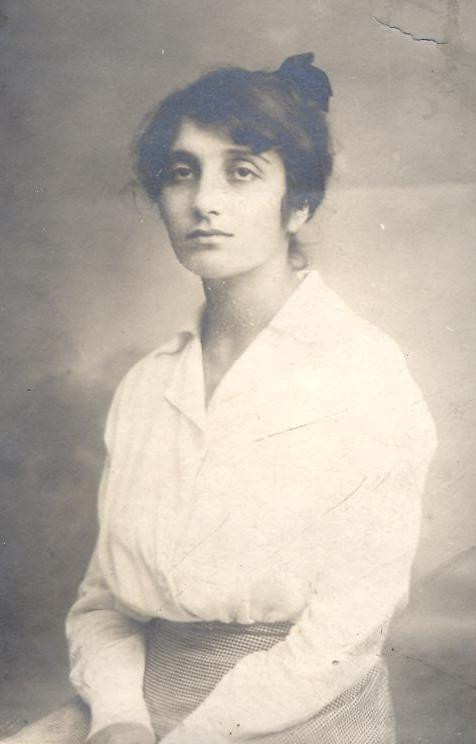
Photo of young Dora Gabe

In 1900 in Shumen, she published one of her first poems, at only 14 years old, called Spring in the literary journal Youth. Soon after, she published a series of poems in the magazines Thought, Democratic Review and New Society in 1905–1906. This marked the start of her literary career.

In the 1920s and 1930s, she published poetry for both adults and children, travelogues, stories, essayistic fiction, impressions, theater reviews, and articles on both foreign and Bulgarian literature. She also wrote biographical sketches of poets and writers for magazines such as Contemporary Thought, Zlatorog, Polish-Bulgarian Review, Democratic Review, Falling Leaves, Dobrudjanski Review, Art and Criticism, Slovo, Age, Journal of Women, Free Speech, Dawn, Women's Voice, Thought, Contemporary, Journal of Newspapers, Dnevnik, and Fireworks.

Additionally, she contributed to various children's periodicals such as Firefly, Children's Joy, Children's World, Drugarche, Children's Life, Iveta, Nightingale, Merry Band, Window, and others.

After 1944, she was widely published in the most popular Bulgarian newspapers and journals, as well as in the children's magazine Nightingale, Squad, Children, art, books, and others.

Violets, Gabe's first lyrical poetry book, demonstrates Secession sentimentalism and a deep understanding of symbolism.

Her works have been translated in Argentina, Austria, Great Britain, Vietnam, Germany, Greece, Canada, Cuba, Lebanon, Peru, Poland, Romania, Russia, Slovakia, Ukraine, France, Czech Republic.

== Translation ==
From 1917 until the end of her life, fluent in Polish, Czech, Russian, French, and Greek, she also dedicated herself to translation work.

She translated the works of Adam Mickiewicz, Maria Konopnicka, Stanisław Wyspiański, Kazimierz Przerwa-Tetmajer, Juliusz Słowacki, Władysław Reymont, Jan Kasprowicz, Henryk Sienkiewicz, B. Leader, Adolf Dygasiński, L. Staffan, A. Slonimsky, Julian Tuwim, K. Alberti, I. Volker, F. Fletch, Vítězslav Nezval, Karel Čapek, G. Jian, Y. Seifert, A. Slutsk, V. Bronevski, C. Imber, Samuil Marshak, E. Kamberos, R. Bumi-Papa, M. Lundemis, Yiannis Ritsos and many others.

Her most renowned translation works include:

- The series of anthologies Polish poets (1921)
- Anthems by Ian Kasprovich (1924)
- Angel by J. Słowacki (1925)

== Works in English ==
- Dora Gabe (1978). John Robert Colombo; Nikola Roussanoff (eds.). Depths: conversations with the sea. Hounslow Press. ISBN 978-0-88882-035-8.

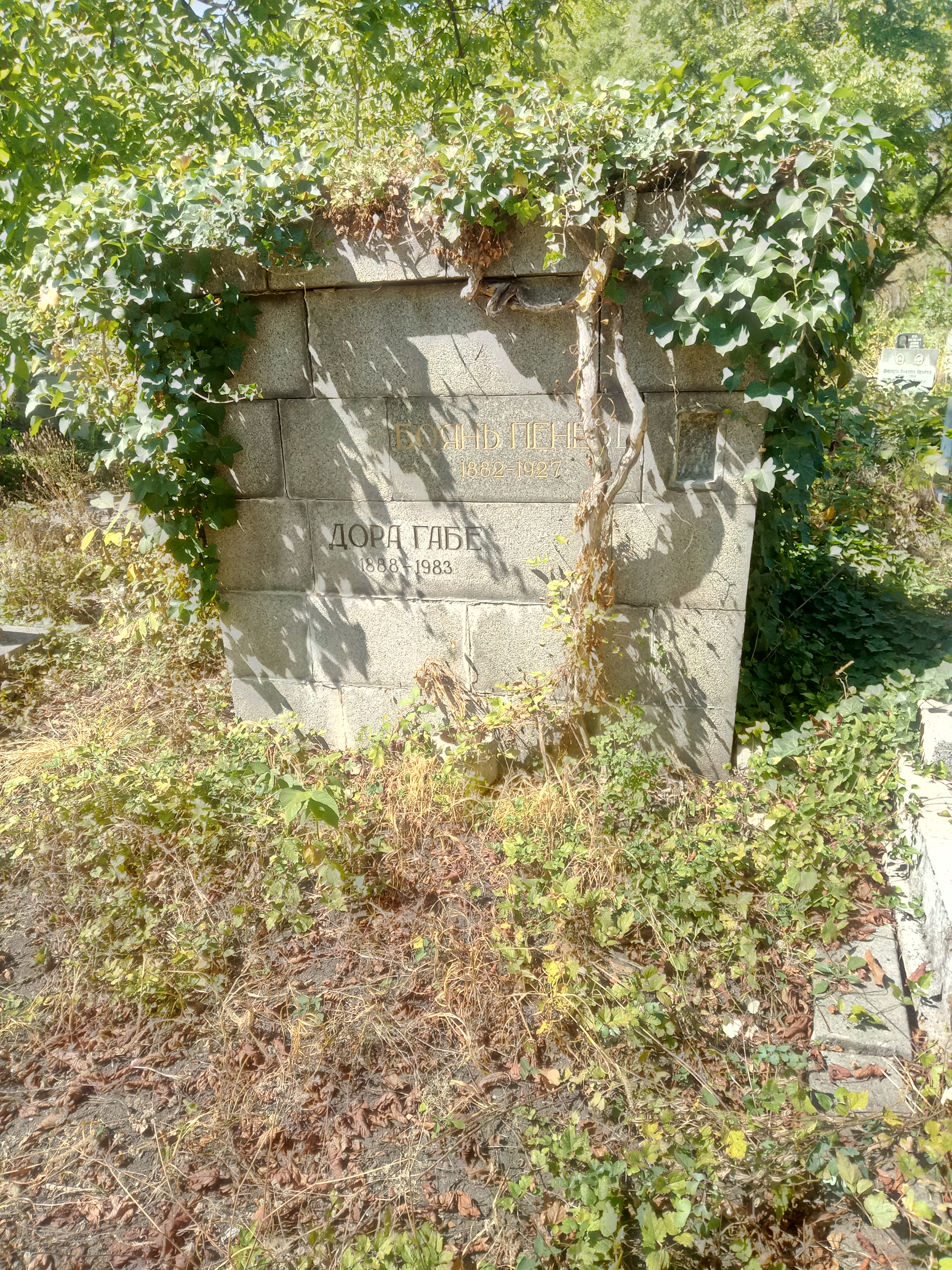
The Grave of Dora Gabe at Sofia Central Cemetery (42°42′49.7″N 023°19′57.2″E)

== Honors and awards ==
- 27 August 1927 - Golden Cross for Merit (Poland)
- 20 April 1929 - an honorary diploma from the Peace Council
- 30 December 1946 - order "9th of September 1944", III degree
- 1 October 1963 - award of the Coalition of Bulgarian Writers for her poem "Homeland"
- 21 May 1966 - honored with the title "Marked agent of culture" in the area of poetry
- In 1968, she was awarded the title "Honorary citizen of the city of Tolbuhin".
- 28 August 1968 - honored with the order "George Dimitrov" for the occasion of her 80th birthday
- 23 May 1969 - honored with the title "Gifted agent of culture"
- 16 June 1972 - honorary diploma from the Central Union of Professional Unions for the traditional epic story "Mother Parashkeva"
- 9 July 1978 - honored with the title "Laureate of Dimitrov's Award" for the poem collections "Wait Sun", "Depths", and "The Thickened Silence"
- 25 August 1978 - honored with the title "Hero of the socialist effort" for the occasion of her 90th birthday
- 25 December 1978 - honored with the honorable sign of Sofia, I degree
- June 1979 - special award from the Union of Bulgarian Composers for her lyrical poem "Headstrong"
- April 1979 - marked with the award "Petko Rachov Slaveikov" for her literary and artistic contribution to children's and young people's literature
