= General Toshevo Municipality =

General Toshevo Municipality Община Генерал Тошево
- Municipality
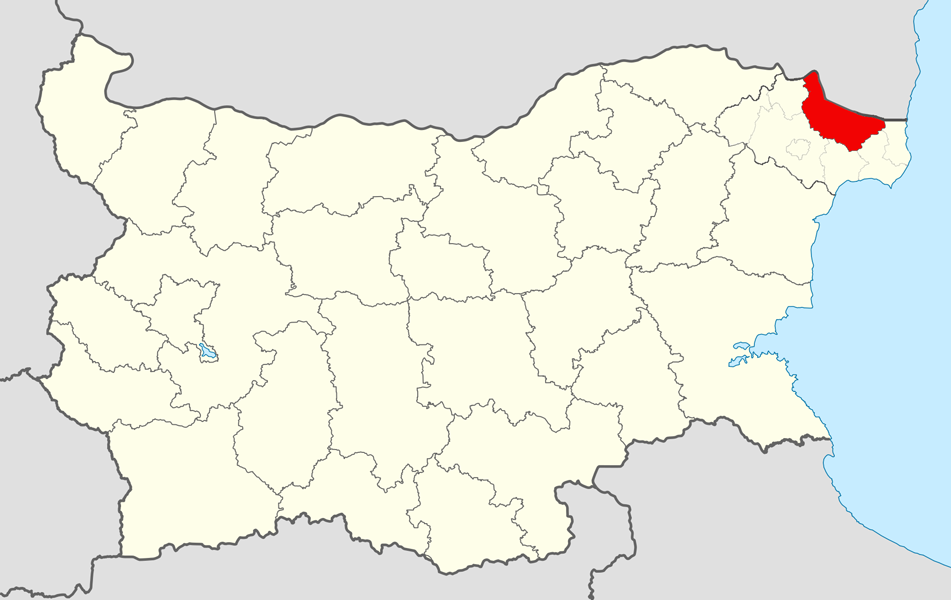
- General Toshevo Municipality within Bulgaria and Dobrich Province.
- Coordinates: 43°43′N 28°4′E
- Country: Bulgaria
- Province (Oblast): Dobrich
- Admin. centre (Obshtinski tsentar): General Toshevo

Area
  - Total: 982.24 km^{2} (379.24 sq mi)

Population (December 2009)
  - Total: 16,714
  - Density: 17.016/km^{2} (44.072/sq mi)
- Time zone: UTC+2 (EET)
  - Summer (DST): UTC+3 (EEST)

General Toshevo Municipality (Bulgarian: Община Генерал Тошево) is a municipality (obshtina) in Dobrich Province, Northeastern Bulgaria, located in Southern Dobruja geographical region, bounded by Romania to the north. It is named after its administrative centre - the town of General Toshevo.

The municipality embraces a territory of 982.24 km^{2} (379.24 sq mi) with a population of 16,714 inhabitants, as of December 2009.

The main road E675 crosses the municipality centrally, connecting the province centre of Dobrich with the Romanian port of Constanța.

== Settlements ==
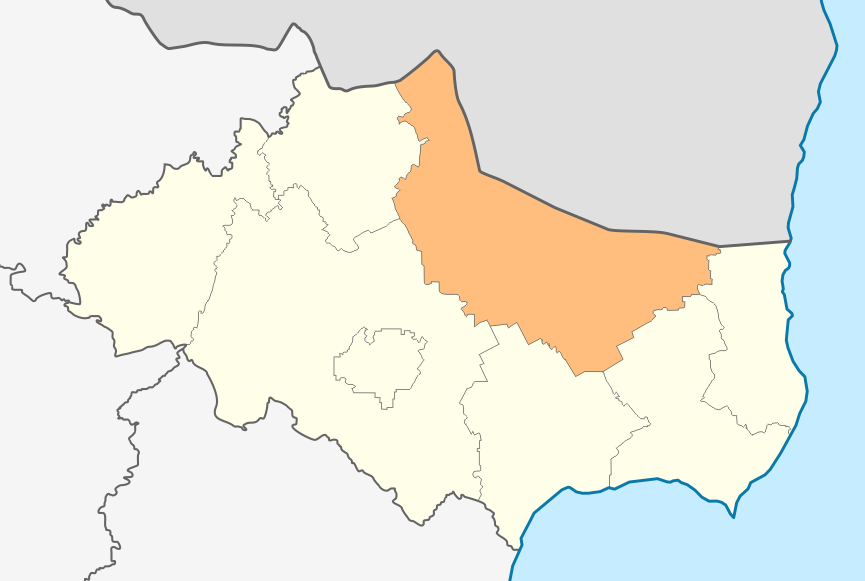
General Toshevo Municipality within Dobrich Province

General Toshevo Municipality includes the following 42 places (towns are shown in bold):

Town/Village	Cyrillic	Population (December 2009)
**General Toshevo**	**Генерал Тошево**	7,130
Aleksandar Stamboliyski	Александър Стамболийски	36
Balkantsi	Балканци	106
Bezhanovo	Бежаново	129
Chernookovo	Чернооково	306
Dabovik	Дъбовик	219
Goritsa	Горица	120
Gradini	Градини	71
Izvorovo	Изворово	300
Kalina	Калина	92
Kardam	Кардам	1051
Konare	Конаре	52
Kraishte	Краище	30
Krasen	Красен	312
Kapinovo	Къпиново	240
Loznitsa	Лозница	44
Lyulyakovo	Люляково	578
Malina	Малина	241
Ograzhden	Огражден	10
Petleshkovo	Петлешково	283
Pisarovo	Писарово	91
Plenimir	Пленимир	92
Preselentsi	Преселенци	326
Prisad	Присад	370
Pchelarovo	Пчеларово	609
Ravnets	Равнец	273
Rogozina	Рогозина	167
Rosen	Росен	112
Rositsa	Росица	440
Sirakovo	Сираково	95
Snop	Сноп	143
Snyagovo	Снягово	210
Spasovo	Спасово	950
Sredina	Средина	89
Sarnino	Сърнино	82
Uzovo	Узово	34
Vasilevo	Василево	415
Velikovo	Великово	64
Vichovo	Вичово	43
Yovkovo	Йовково	324
Zograf	Зограф	160
Zhiten	Житен	275
Total		16,714

== Demography ==
The following table shows the change of the population during the last four decades.

General Toshevo Municipality
Year	1975	1985	1992	2001	2005	2007	2009	2011
Population	31,264	26,187	22,931	19,422	18,227	17,560	16,714	...
Sources: Census 2001, Census 2011, „pop-stat.mashke.org“,

=== Religion ===
According to the latest Bulgarian census of 2011, the religious composition, among those who answered the optional question on religious identification, was the following:

Religious composition of General Toshevo Municipality
Orthodox Christianity	71.7%
Catholicism	0.5%
Protestantism	0.7%
Islam	14.6%
No religion	4.3%
Prefer not to answer, others and indefinable	8.2%

== See also ==
- Provinces of Bulgaria
- Municipalities of Bulgaria
- List of cities and towns in Bulgaria
