= Kapinovo =

Kapinovo may refer to the following places:

- Kapinovo, Dobrich Province, Bulgaria
- Kapinovo, Veliko Tarnovo Province, Bulgaria
- Kapinovo, Čaška, a village in Čaška Municipality, Republic of North Macedonia
