= Vasilevo =

Vasilevo may refer to:

- Vasilevo, Bulgaria, a village in Dobrich Province
- Vasilevo, North Macedonia, a village in Vasilevo Municipality
- Despotovo, formerly Vasiljevo, a village in Serbia
