= Negru Vodă =

Negru Vodă can refer to:

- Radu Negru, a mythical early ruler of Wallachia
- Negru Vodă, Constanța, a town in Constanţa County
