= Pisarovo =

Pisarovo may refer to the following places in Bulgaria:

- Pisarovo, Dobrich Province, a village in General Toshevo Municipality
- Pisarovo, Pleven Province, a village in Iskar Municipality
