= Ravnets =

Ravnets, also spelled Ravnetz, may refer to:

- Ravnets, Burgas Province, a village in the Burgas municipality, Burgas Province
- Ravnets, Dobrich Province, a village in the General Toshevo municipality, Dobrich Province
- Ravnets Air Base, a former military airfield near Burgas, Bulgaria
