= Stari Prisad =

Stari Prisad/Old Prisad Стари Присад
- Former village
- Country: North Macedonia
- Municipality: Prilep
- Elevation: 932 m (3,058 ft)

Population (2002)
  - Total: 0
- Time zone: UTC+1 (CET)

Stari Prisad is a unihabitated village and the old settlement of Prisad in Prilep, North Macedonia. Stari Prisad partly was one of the 4 villages which made up the name Prisad Island, an Antarctic island.

According to the 1467–68 Ottoman defter, Prisad had 19 households and 3 bachelors. The register displayed a majority Albanian and mixed Slavic-Albanian anthroponomy.
