= Bezhanovo =

Bezhanovo may refer to the following places in Bulgaria:

- Bezhanovo, Dobrich Province
- Bezhanovo, Lovech Province
