= Ograzhden =

Ograzhden may refer to:

- Ograzhden (mountain)
- Ograzhden, Dobrich Province, village in Bulgaria
- Ograzhden Cove, cove on Livingston Island in the South Shetland Islands
