= Snop =

Snop or SNOP may refer to:

- Snop, Bulgaria, a village in Bulgaria
- Systematized Nomenclature of Pathology
- Shell Nigeria Oil Products, a subsidiary of Shell Nigeria

== See also ==
- Snope
