= Konare =

Konare may refer to:

== People ==
- Alpha Oumar Konaré
- Issa Konare
- Adame Ba Konaré
- Amadou Konare
- Soumaïla Konaré

== Organizations ==
- KONARE, left-wing revolutionary organization of Albanian émigré

== Places ==
- Konare, Dobrich Province
- Konare, Stara Zagora Province
