= List of Romanian counties by GDP =

This is a list of the 41 Romanian counties, and one city with special status (Bucharest, the national capital) by GDP and GDP per capita.

== List of counties by GDP ==
Counties by GDP in 2023 according to data by the OECD.

Rank	County	GDP in mil RON	GDP in mil USD (PPP)
1	Bucharest	426,779	242,643
2	Cluj	85,341	48,520
3	Timiș	71,193	40,476
4	Constanța	65,051	36,984
5	Prahova	63,282	35,978
6	Iași	52,724	29,976
7	Brașov	52,448	29,819
8	Ilfov	45,666	25,963
9	Argeș	40,383	22,960
10	Dolj	38,834	22,079
11	Bihor	36,667	20,847
12	Mureș	33,715	19,168
13	Sibiu	33,036	18,783
14	Gorj	32,059	18,227
15	Bacău	30,926	17,583
16	Arad	30,481	17,330
17	Suceava	28,778	16,362
18	Dâmbovița	26,129	14,856
19	Maramureș	25,489	14,492
20	Galați	25,108	14,275
21	Alba	24,247	13,786
22	Hunedoara	22,939	13,042
23	Neamț	22,520	12,804
24	Vâlcea	21,393	12,163
25	Buzău	20,608	11,717
26	Satu Mare	18,591	10,570
27	Olt	18,420	10,472
28	Harghita	17,360	9,870
29	Teleorman	17,288	9,829
30	Brăila	16,598	9,437
31	Caraș-Severin	15,988	9,090
32	Vrancea	15 087	8,577
33	Bistrița-Năsăud	14,897	8,469
34	Botoșani	14,387	8,180
35	Ialomița	13,696	7,787
36	Mehedinți	13,200	7,505
37	Sălaj	12,970	7,374
38	Vaslui	12,848	7,305
39	Tulcea	12,677	7,208
40	Călărași	12,104	6,882
41	Covasna	11,361	6,459
42	Giurgiu	10,245	5,825
	Romania	1,604,554	912,260

== List of counties by GDP per capita ==
Counties by GDP per capita in 2023 according to data by the OECD.

Rank	County	GDP per capita in RON	GDP per capita in USD (PPP)
1	Bucharest	247,744	140,854
2	Cluj	123,387	70,151
3	Timiș	107,615	61,184
4	Gorj	103,088	58,610
5	Constanța	98,870	56,212
6	Brașov	94,456	53,702
7	Prahova	91,694	52,132
8	Ilfov	79,518	45,209
9	Sibiu	84,126	47,830
10	Alba	74,376	42,286
11	Arad	74,217	42,196
12	Argeș	71,442	40,618
13	Iași	67,908	38,609
14	Tulcea	66,609	37,870
15	Bihor	66,071	37,564
16	Caraș-Severin	65,406	37,186
17	Mureș	64,875	36,884
18	Dolj	64,810	36,847
19	Hunedoara	64,384	36,605
20	Vâlcea	62,781	35,694
21	Sălaj	61,555	34,997
22	Brăila	60,174	34,212
23	Harghita	59,434	33,791
24	Mehedinți	57,143	32,488
25	Covasna	56,863	32,329
26	Maramureș	56,397	32,064
27	Satu Mare	56,223	31,965
28	Ialomița	54,846	31,183
29	Dâmbovița	54,778	31,144
30	Teleorman	54,595	31,040
31	Bacău	51,829	29,467
32	Buzău	51,602	29,338
33	Galați	50,866	28,920
34	Bistrița-Năsăud	50,203	28,542
35	Neamț	50,200	28,541
36	Olt	48,781	27,734
37	Vrancea	45,365	25,792
38	Suceava	44,719	25,425
39	Călărași	43,248	24,588
40	Giurgiu	39,529	22,245
41	Botoșani	36,955	21,010
42	Vaslui	34,676	19,715
	Romania	84,168	47,853
