= Prisad, Burgas Province =

Prisad
- Village
- Location within Bulgaria
- Coordinates: 42°22′N 27°23′E
- Country: Bulgaria
- Province: Burgas Province
- Municipality: Sozopol Municipality
- Time zone: UTC+2 (EET)
  - Summer (DST): UTC+3 (EEST)

Prisad is a village in Sozopol Municipality, in Burgas Province, in southeastern Bulgaria.

== Honours ==
Prisad Island in Antarctica is named after the village.
