= Lyulyakovo, Dobrich Province =

Lyulyakovo
- Village
- Location in Bulgaria
- Coordinates: 43°40′50″N 28°05′15″E
- Country: Bulgaria
- Province: Dobrich Province
- Municipality: General Toshevo Municipality
- Time zone: UTC+2 (EET)
  - Summer (DST): UTC+3 (EEST)

Lyulyakovo is a village in General Toshevo Municipality, Dobrich Province, in northeastern Bulgaria.
