= Cerchezu =

- Commune
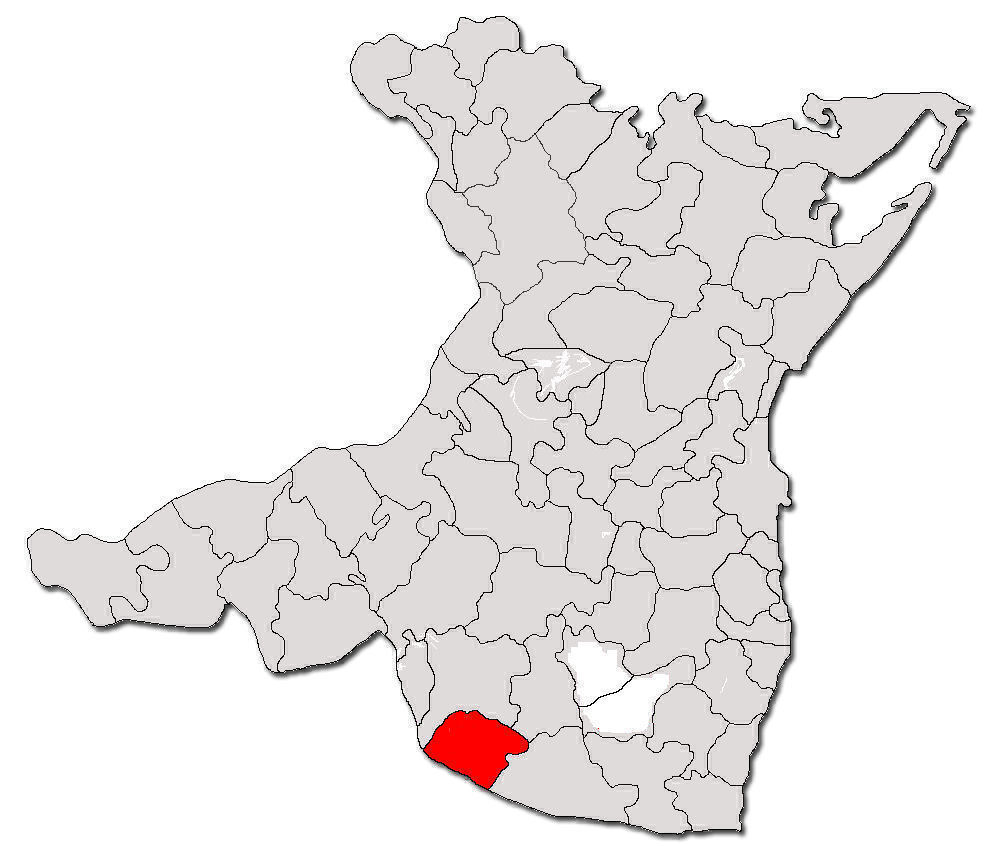
- Location in Constanța County

- Location in Romania
- Coordinates: 43°49′30″N 28°5′53″E
- Country: Romania
- County: Constanța
- Subdivisions: Cerchezu, Căscioarele, Măgura, Viroaga

Government
  - Mayor (2020–2024): Ștefan Chelaru (PSD)
- Area: 72.67 km^{2} (28.06 sq mi)
- Elevation: 131 m (430 ft)
- Population (2021-12-01): 1,256
  - Density: 17.28/km^{2} (44.76/sq mi)
- Time zone: UTC+02:00 (EET)
  - Summer (DST): UTC+03:00 (EEST)
- Postal code: 907045
- Area code: +(40) 241
- Vehicle reg.: CT
- Website: www.primariacerchezu.ro

Cerchezu (Romanian pronunciation: [t͡ʃerˈkezu]) is a commune in Constanța County, Northern Dobruja, Romania. The commune includes four villages:

- Cerchezu (historical name: Cerchezchioi, Turkish: Çerkezköy, German: Tscherkess), named after the Circassian minority that settled the region.
- Căscioarele (historical name: Mamușlia, Turkish: Mamuşlu, German: Mamuslia)
- Măgura (historical name: Docuzaci, Turkish: Dokuzağaç)
- Viroaga (historical name: Calfachioi, Turkish: Kalfaköy)

The territory of the commune also includes the former village of Căciulați (historical name: Cealmagea), nominally merged with Viroaga by the 1968 administrative reform.

Cerchezu is located in the southern part of the county, 70 km (43 mi) southeast of the county seat, the port city of Constanța, on the border with Bulgaria. It is crossed by county road DJ391A, which connects it to national road DN3 to the north and to DN38 just to the east.

== Demographics ==
At the 2011 census, Cerchezu had 1,287 Romanians (99.84%) and 2 others (0.16%). At the 2021 census, the commune had a population of 1,256; of those, 91.64% were Romanians. Before World War II the commune had a small German minority.
