= Izvorovo, Dobrich Province =

Izvorovo
- Village
- Location in Bulgaria
- Coordinates: 43.809°N 27.942°E
- Country: Bulgaria
- Province: Dobrich Province
- Municipality: General Toshevo
- Time zone: UTC+2 (EET)
  - Summer (DST): UTC+3 (EEST)

Izvorovo is a village in General Toshevo Municipality, Dobrich Province, in northeastern Bulgaria.
