= Balkantsi, Dobrich Province =

Balkantsi Балканци
- Village
- Location within Bulgaria
- Coordinates: 43°35′52″N 28°9′49″E
- Country: Bulgaria
- Province: Dobrich Province
- Municipality: General Toshevo
- Time zone: UTC+2 (EET)
  - Summer (DST): UTC+3 (EEST)

Balkantsi is a village in General Toshevo Municipality, Dobrich Province, northeastern Bulgaria.
