= Kardam, Dobrich Province =

Kardam Кардам
- Village
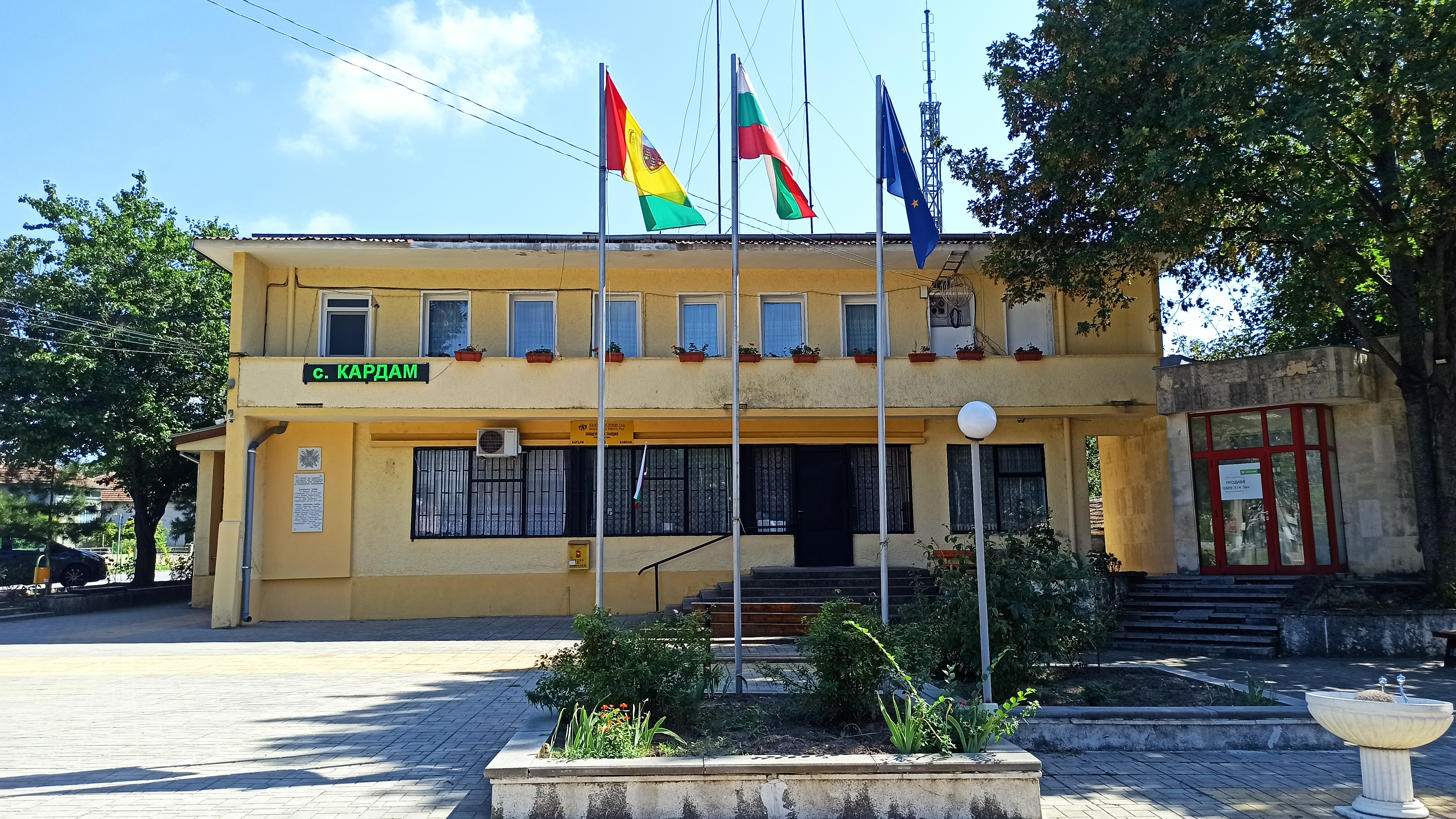
- Village hall

- Location within Bulgaria
- Coordinates: 43°45′N 28°06′E
- Country: Bulgaria
- Province: Dobrich Province
- Municipality: General Toshevo Municipality

Area
  - Total: 55.354 km^{2} (21.372 sq mi)

Population (2025)
  - Total: 715
- Time zone: UTC+2 (EET)
  - Summer (DST): UTC+3 (EEST)

Kardam (Bulgarian: Кардам, Turkish: Arman) is a village in General Toshevo Municipality, Dobrich Province, in northeastern Bulgaria. Kardam is close to the border with Romania and there is a border crossing linking the village to the Romanian town Negru Vodă.
