= Zhiten, Dobrich Province =

Zhiten
- Village
- Location in Bulgaria
- Coordinates: 43°48′50″N 27°53′40″E
- Country: Bulgaria
- Province: Dobrich Province
- Municipality: General Toshevo Municipality
- Time zone: UTC+2 (EET)
  - Summer (DST): UTC+3 (EEST)

Zhiten is a village in General Toshevo Municipality, Dobrich Province, in northeastern Bulgaria.
