= Gradini =

- Village
- Location within Bulgaria
- Coordinates: 43°46′N 27°54′E
- Country: Bulgaria
- Province: Dobrich Province
- Municipality: General Toshevo
- Time zone: UTC+2 (EET)
  - Summer (DST): UTC+3 (EEST)

Gradini is a village in General Toshevo Municipality, Dobrich Province, northeastern Bulgaria.
