= Snyagovo, Dobrich Province =

Snyagovo
- Village
- Location in Bulgaria
- Coordinates: 43.752°N 28.063°E
- Country: Bulgaria
- Province: Dobrich Province
- Municipality: General Toshevo Municipality
- Time zone: UTC+2 (EET)
  - Summer (DST): UTC+3 (EEST)

Snyagovo is a village in General Toshevo Municipality, Dobrich Province, in northeastern Bulgaria.

Until 1943, one of the German colonies in Bulgaria, called Hasarlik (from osman Hasarlik) was located in the village, consisting of 20 Dobruja German families. In the period from 1940 to 1951, the local primary school bore the name "St. Cyril and Methodius". On November 1, 1963, the village was renamed Snyagovo.
