= Chernookovo, Dobrich Province =

Chernookovo Чернооково
- Village
- Location in Bulgaria
- Coordinates: 43°42′40″N 28°10′05″E
- Country: Bulgaria
- Province: Dobrich Province
- Municipality: General Toshevo
- Time zone: UTC+2 (EET)
  - Summer (DST): UTC+3 (EEST)

Chernookovo is a village in General Toshevo Municipality, Dobrich Province, northeastern Bulgaria.
