= Prisad, North Macedonia =

Prisad Присад
- Village
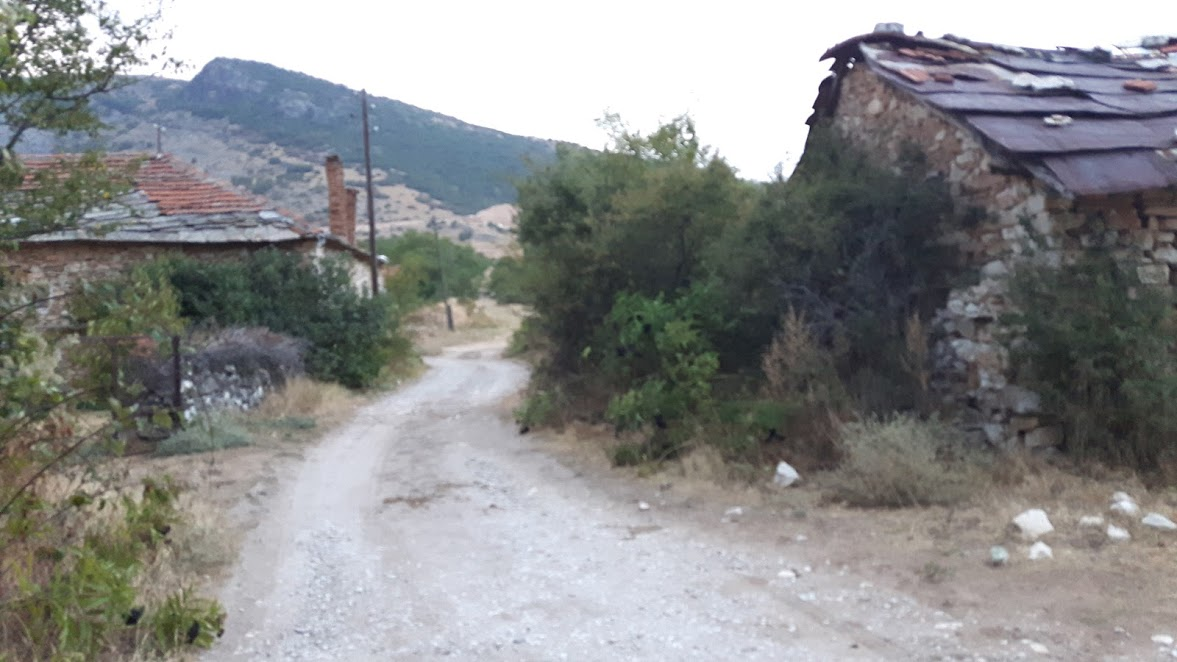
- Overview of Prisad

- Location within North Macedonia
- Country: North Macedonia
- Region: Pelagonia
- Municipality: Prilep
- Elevation: 948 m (3,110 ft)

Population (2002)
  - Total: 5
- Time zone: UTC+1 (CET)
- Area code: +38948

Prisad is a village in Municipality of Prilep. The village, along with 3 other villages, are known for being the name of an Antarctic Island.

== Demographics ==
According to the 2002 census, the village had a total of 5 inhabitants. Ethnic groups in the village include:

- Macedonians 5
