= Aleksandar Stamboliyski, Bulgaria =

Aleksandar Stamboliyski Александър Стамболийски
- Village
- Location within Bulgaria
- Coordinates: 43°41′1″N 28°21′30″E
- Country: Bulgaria
- Province: Dobrich Province
- Municipality: General Toshevo Municipality
- Elevation: 84 m (276 ft)

Population (2020)
  - Total: 26
- Time zone: UTC+2 (EET)
  - Summer (DST): UTC+3 (EEST)

Aleksandar Stamboliyski is a village in General Toshevo Municipality, Dobrich Province, northeastern Bulgaria. The village of Aleksandar Stamboliyski is located in the coastal Southern Dobrudzha, 52 km northeast of the regional center, the city of Dobrich, and 33 km from the municipal center, the city of General-Toshevo, 37 km northwest of the city of Shabla, 5.6 km southwest of the village of Bezhanovo, and 6.8 km southeast of the village of Spasovo. About 8 km as the crow flies north of it is the border with Romania, and 18 km east is the village of Durankulak. It is located in the Eastern Danube Plain, on a territory with a slightly hilly relief. Through its southern low-lying parts passes the deep and dry valley (dry valley) "Suhoto dere", coming from the west through the villages of Velikovo, Sirakovo, Sarnino and passing north past the village of Bezhanovo and on to Romanian territory. In its northwestern part, in the lowest parts of the valley, there are long-abandoned wells with drinking water, each of which is about 80 m deep, with reinforced concrete or metal structures over the opening of each of them in order to prevent injury or death. The altitude in the center of the village is about 84 m. The climate is moderately continental.To the north, an asphalted municipal road of about 2 km connects the village with the third-class republican road III-2904, leading east through the villages of Bezhanovo, Zahari Stoyanovo and Staevtsi to the village of Durankulak, and to the west - through the villages of Spasovo, Rogozina and Chernookovo to the village of Kardam and a connection there with the second-class republican road II-29, which leads north to the border with Romania and the Border Checkpoint (BCP) Kardam, and south through the town of General Toshevo to the city of Varna. The fertile soils and suitable climate in the region favor the development of agriculture and animal husbandry. Characteristic for the massifs of agricultural land properties in the village is the presence of field protection forest belts with a width of 10 - 12 m to about 30 m along the borders of a large part of them. The land of the village of Aleksandar Stamboliyski borders the lands of: the village of Spasovo to the northwest and north; the village of Bezhanovo to the north and northeast; the village of Chernomortsi to the east; the village of Bilo to the south; the village of Septemvriytsi to the south; the village of Belgun to the southwest; the village of Sarnino to the west.
