= Negru Vodă, Constanța =

Negru Vodă
- Town
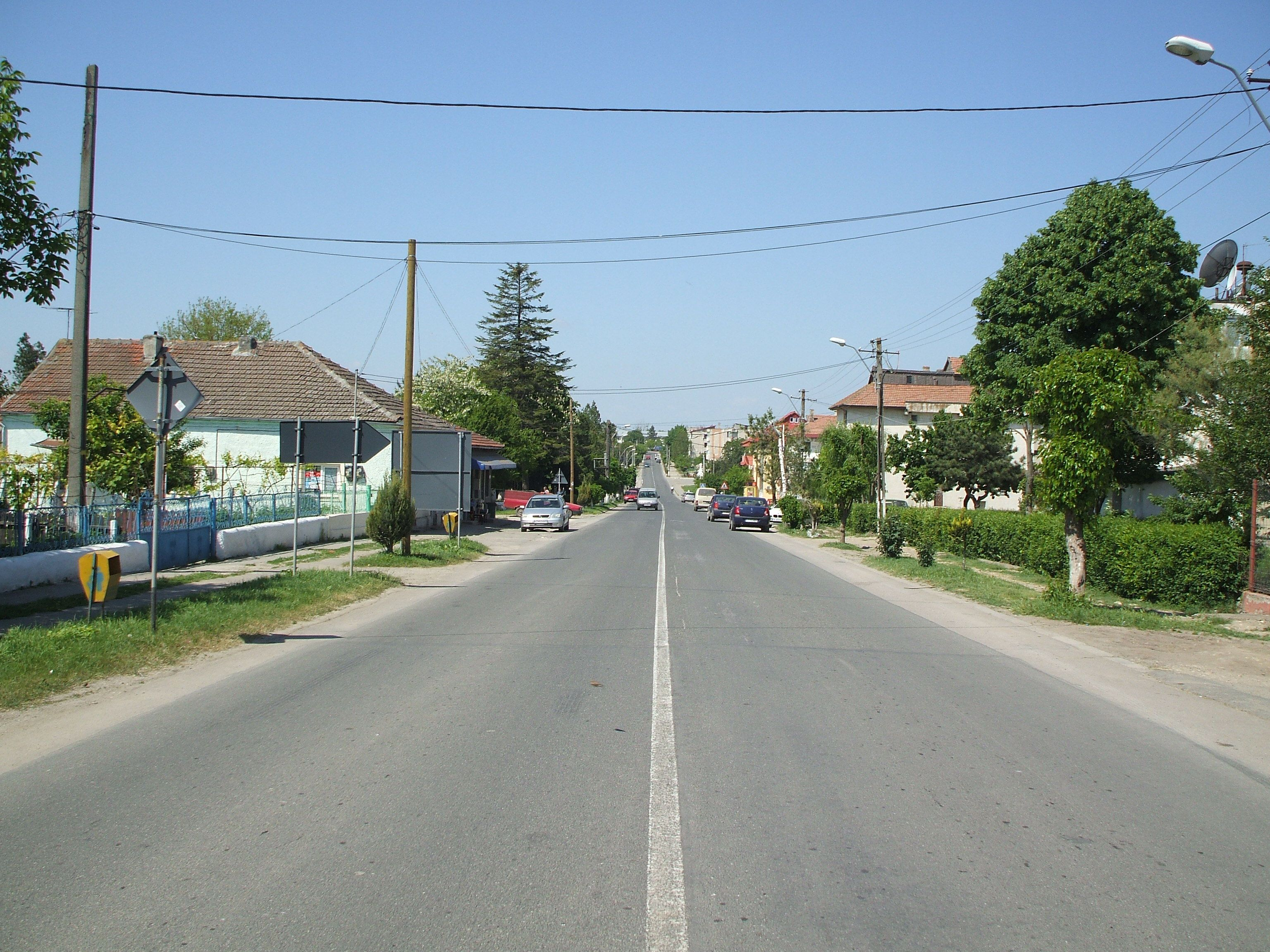
- Image from the town center

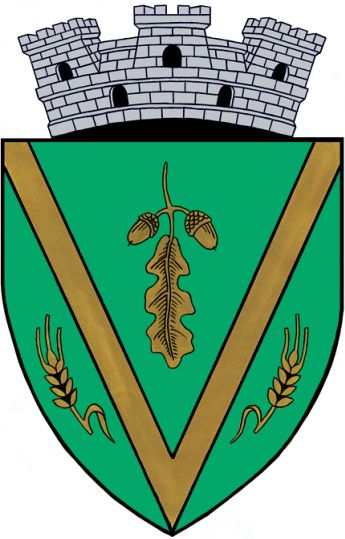
- Coat of arms

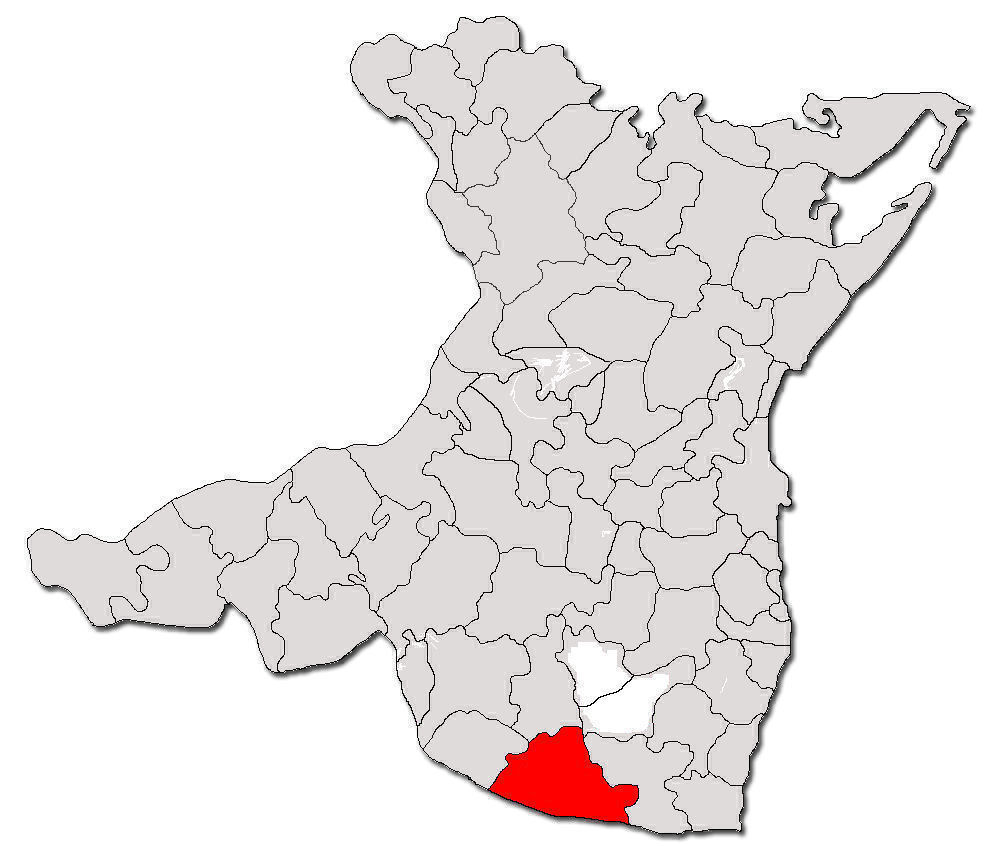
- Location in Constanța County
- Interactive map of Negru Vodă
- Location in Romania
- Coordinates: 43°49′12″N 28°13′12″E
- Country: Romania
- County: Constanța
- Subdivisions: Darabani, Vâlcele

Government
  - Mayor (2024–2028): Mihai-Adrian Argintaru (AUR)
- Area: 164 km^{2} (63 sq mi)
- Population (2021-12-01): 4,616
  - Density: 28.1/km^{2} (72.9/sq mi)
- Time zone: UTC+02:00 (EET)
  - Summer (DST): UTC+03:00 (EEST)
- Vehicle reg.: CT
- Website: www.primaria-negru-voda.ro

Negru Vodă (Romanian pronunciation: [ˌneɡru ˈvodə], historical names: Caraomer, Turkish: Karaömer) is a town in Constanța County, Northern Dobruja, south-eastern Romania. The town is close to the border with Bulgaria and there is a border crossing linking Negru Vodă to the Bulgarian village Kardam. It officially became a town in 1989, as a result of the Romanian rural systematization program.

The name is probably derived from the legendary Radu Negru (also known as Negru Vodă, the "Black Prince"), founder and ruler of Wallachia.

It has an area of 164.9 square kilometres (63.7 sq mi).

== Administration ==
The following villages are administered by the town of Negru Vodă:

- Darabani (historical names: Daulchioi, Turkish: Davulköy)
- Vâlcele (historical names: Valalî, Turkish: Valalı)

Although still mentioned in the official documents as part of the township, the village of Grăniceru (historical names: Canlî Ciucur, Turkish: Kanlı Çukur), located at 43.792845°N 28.263239°E, is currently deserted.

== Demographics ==
Historical population
Year	Pop.	±%
1992	5,458	—
2002	5,529	+1.3%
2011	4,933	−10.8%
2021	4,616	−6.4%
Source: Census data

At the 2021 census, Negru Vodă had a population of 4,616. At the 2011 census, the town had 4,933 residents; of those, 4,698 were Romanians (95.24%), 160 Roma (3.24%), 43 Turks (0.87%), 28 Tatars (0.57%), and 4 others (0.08%).

== Gallery ==
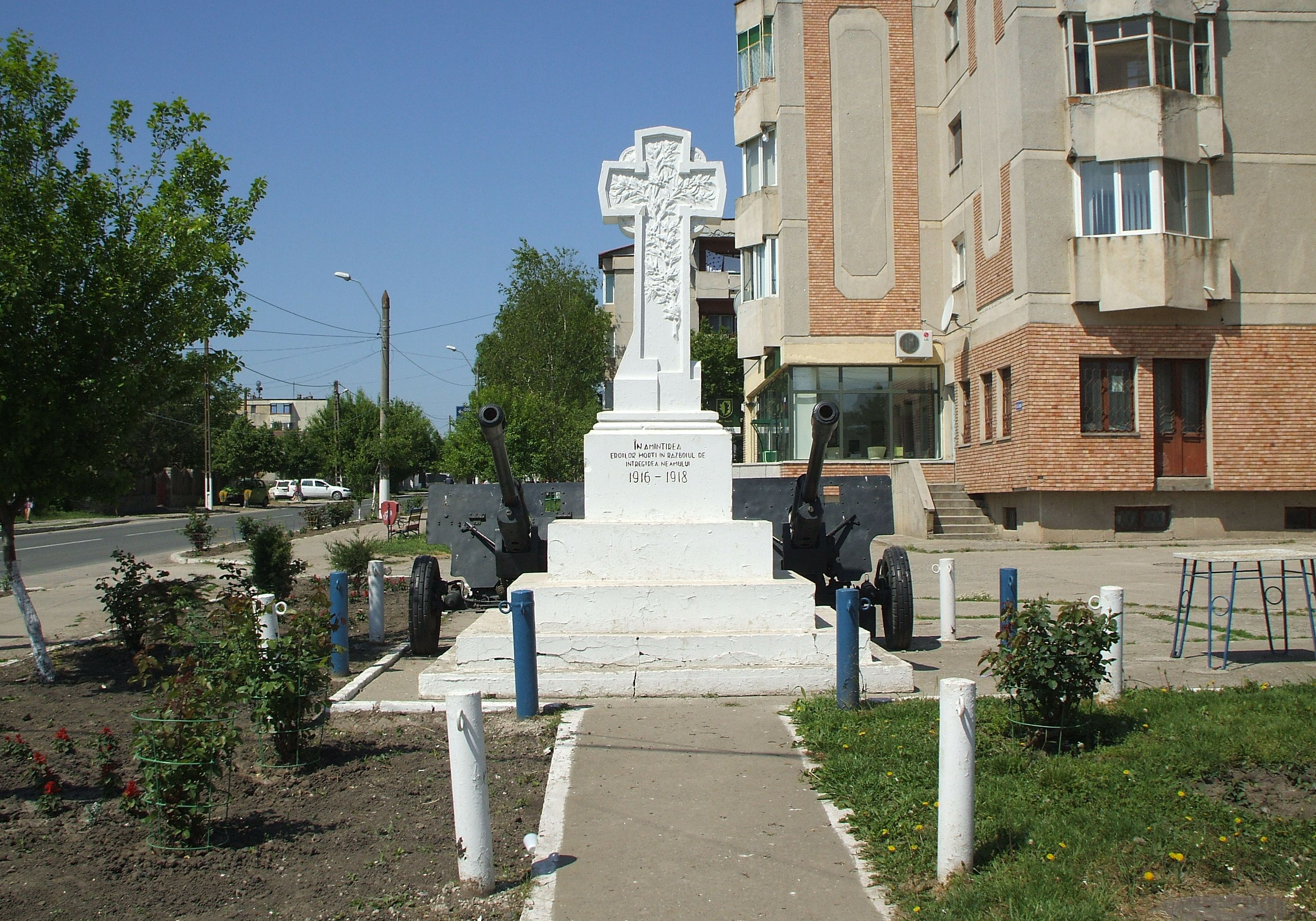
World War I memorial
