= Zograf, Bulgaria =

- Village
- Location within Bulgaria
- Coordinates: 43°44′N 27°56′E
- Country: Bulgaria
- Province: Dobrich Province
- Municipality: General Toshevo Municipality
- Time zone: UTC+2 (EET)
  - Summer (DST): UTC+3 (EEST)

Zograf, Bulgaria is a village in General Toshevo Municipality, Dobrich Province, northeastern Bulgaria.
