= Kalina, Dobrich Province =

Kalina
- Village
- Location in Bulgaria
- Coordinates: 43.629°N 28.203°E
- Country: Bulgaria
- Province: Dobrich Province
- Municipality: General Toshevo Municipality
- Time zone: UTC+2 (EET)
  - Summer (DST): UTC+3 (EEST)

Kalina is a village in General Toshevo Municipality, Dobrich Province, in northeastern Bulgaria.
