= Goritsa, Dobrich Province =

Goritsa
- Village
- Location in Bulgaria
- Coordinates: 43.639°N 28.166°E
- Country: Bulgaria
- Province: Dobrich Province
- Municipality: General Toshevo
- Time zone: UTC+2 (EET)
  - Summer (DST): UTC+3 (EEST)

Goritsa is a village in General Toshevo Municipality, Dobrich Province, northeastern Bulgaria.
