= Prisad, Dobrich Province =

Prisad
- Village
- Location in Bulgaria
- Coordinates: 43.672°N 28.029°E
- Country: Bulgaria
- Province: Dobrich Province
- Municipality: General Toshevo Municipality
- Time zone: UTC+2 (EET)
  - Summer (DST): UTC+3 (EEST)

Prisad is a village in General Toshevo Municipality, Dobrich Province, in northeastern Bulgaria.

== Honours ==
Prisad Island in Antarctica is named after the village.
