= Rositsa, Dobrich Province =

Rositsa
- Village
- Location within Bulgaria
- Coordinates: 43°56′N 27°54′E
- Country: Bulgaria
- Province: Dobrich Province
- Municipality: General Toshevo Municipality
- Time zone: UTC+2 (EET)
  - Summer (DST): UTC+3 (EEST)

Rositsa is a village in General Toshevo Municipality, Dobrich Province, in northeastern Bulgaria.
