= Pchelarovo, Dobrich Province =

Pchelarovo Пчеларово
- Village
- Location within Bulgaria
- Coordinates: 43°43′36″N 27°55′09″E
- Country: Bulgaria
- Province: Dobrich Province
- Municipality: General Toshevo Municipality

Area
  - Total: 26.444 km^{2} (10.210 sq mi)
- Elevation: 222 m (728 ft)
- Time zone: UTC+2 (EET)
  - Summer (DST): UTC+3 (EEST)

Pchelarovo is a village in General Toshevo Municipality, Dobrich Province, in northeastern Bulgaria.

Ethnic groups in Pchelarovo (2011)
1. Bulgarians (59.3%)
2. Roma (36.1%)
3. Other (0.00%)
4. Unknown (4.56%)
