= Snop, Bulgaria =

Snop Сноп
- Village
- Location in Bulgaria.
- Coordinates: 43°48′N 27°53′E
- Country: Bulgaria
- Province: Dobrich Province

Population
  - Total: 180

Snop (Bulgarian: Сноп) is a small village near General Toshevo, Dobrich, Bulgaria. It has a population of approximately 180.
