= Bezhanovo, Dobrich Province =

Bezhanovo Бежаново
- Village
- Location in Bulgaria
- Coordinates: 43°42′50″N 28°23′35″E
- Country: Bulgaria
- Province: Dobrich Province
- Municipality: General Toshevo
- Time zone: UTC+2 (EET)
  - Summer (DST): UTC+3 (EEST)

Bezhanovo is a village in General Toshevo Municipality, Dobrich Province, northeastern Bulgaria.
