= Krasen, Dobrich Province =

Krasen
- Village
- Location in Bulgaria
- Coordinates: 43°50′30″N 27°55′50″E
- Country: Bulgaria
- Province: Dobrich Province
- Municipality: General Toshevo Municipality
- Time zone: UTC+2 (EET)
  - Summer (DST): UTC+3 (EEST)

Krasen is a village in General Toshevo Municipality, Dobrich Province, in northeastern Bulgaria.
