= Dabovik =

- Village
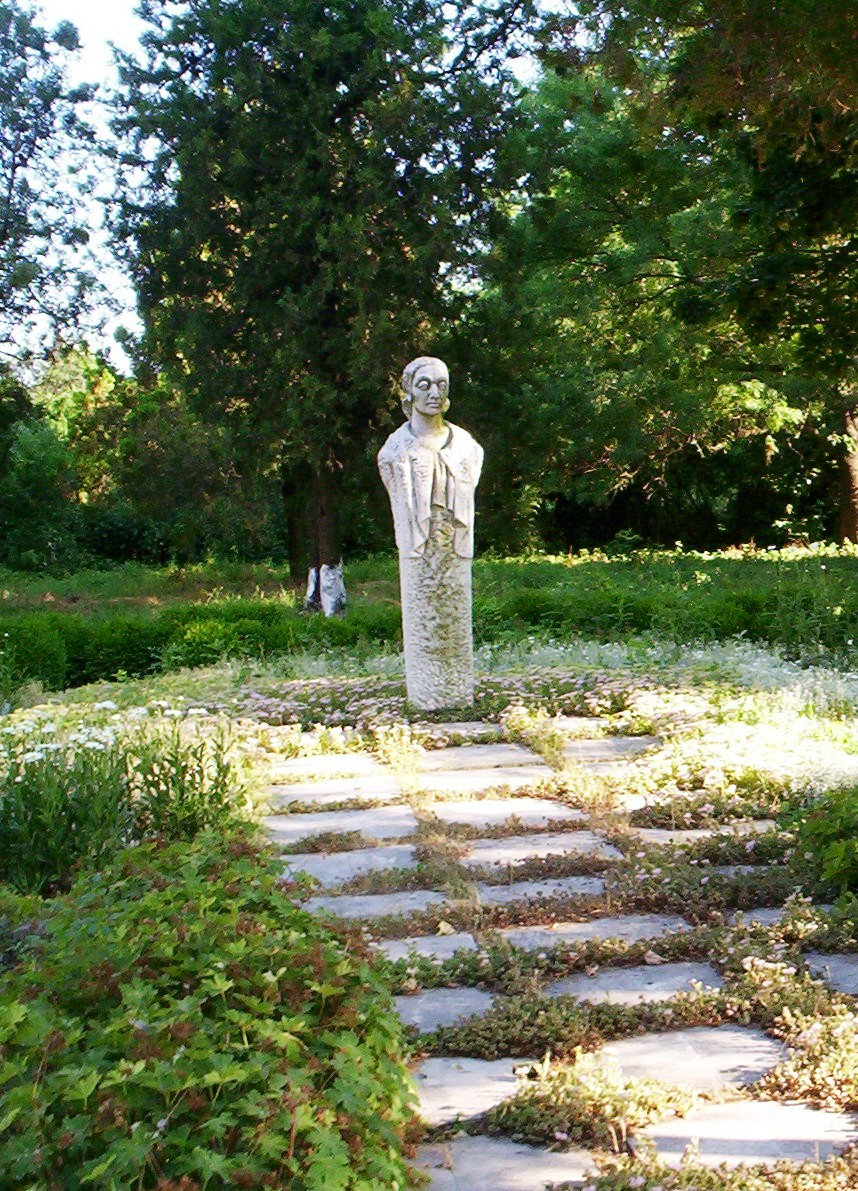
- Sculpture in Dabovik

- Location within Bulgaria
- Coordinates: 43°41′N 27°57′E
- Country: Bulgaria
- Province: Dobrich Province
- Municipality: General Toshevo
- Time zone: UTC+2 (EET)
  - Summer (DST): UTC+3 (EEST)

Dabovik is a village in General Toshevo Municipality, Dobrich Province, northeastern Bulgaria.
