= Ograzhden, Dobrich Province =

Ograzhden
- Village
- Location within Bulgaria
- Coordinates: 43°47′N 28°05′E
- Country: Bulgaria
- Province: Dobrich Province
- Municipality: General Toshevo Municipality
- Time zone: UTC+2 (EET)
  - Summer (DST): UTC+3 (EEST)

Ograzhden is a village in the General Toshevo Municipality, Dobrich Province, northeastern Bulgaria.
