= Prisad Island =

Island in the South Shetland Islands

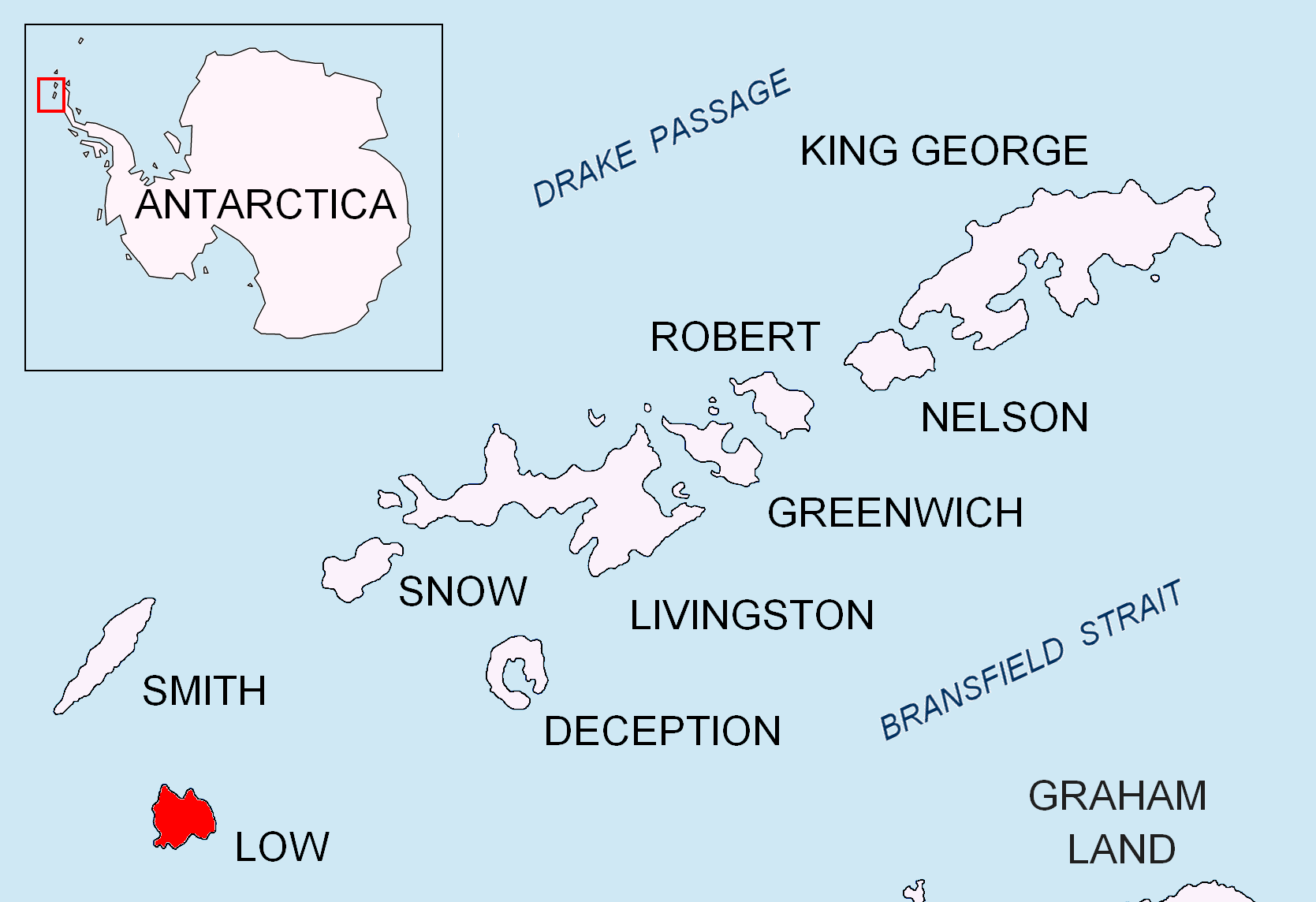
- Location of Low Island in the South Shetland Islands

- Location within Antarctica Location within Antarctic Peninsula

Geography
- Location: Antarctica
- Coordinates: 63°13′55″S 62°10′38″W
- Archipelago: South Shetland Islands

Administration
- Antarctica
- Administered under the Antarctic Treaty System

Demographics
- Population: uninhabited

Prisad Island (Bulgarian: остров Присад, romanized: ostrov Prisad, IPA: [ˈɔstrof ˈprisɐt]) is the rocky island off the north coast of Low Island in the South Shetland Islands extending 640 m in southwest–northeast direction and 520 m wide. It is separated from Limets Peninsula by a 60 m wide passage.

The feature is named "after the settlements of Prisad in Northeastern and Southeastern Bulgaria."

== Location ==
Prisad Island is located at 63°13′55″S 62°10′38″W, which is 1.44 km east of Cape Wallace. British mapping in 2009.

== See also ==
- List of Antarctic and subantarctic islands

== Maps ==
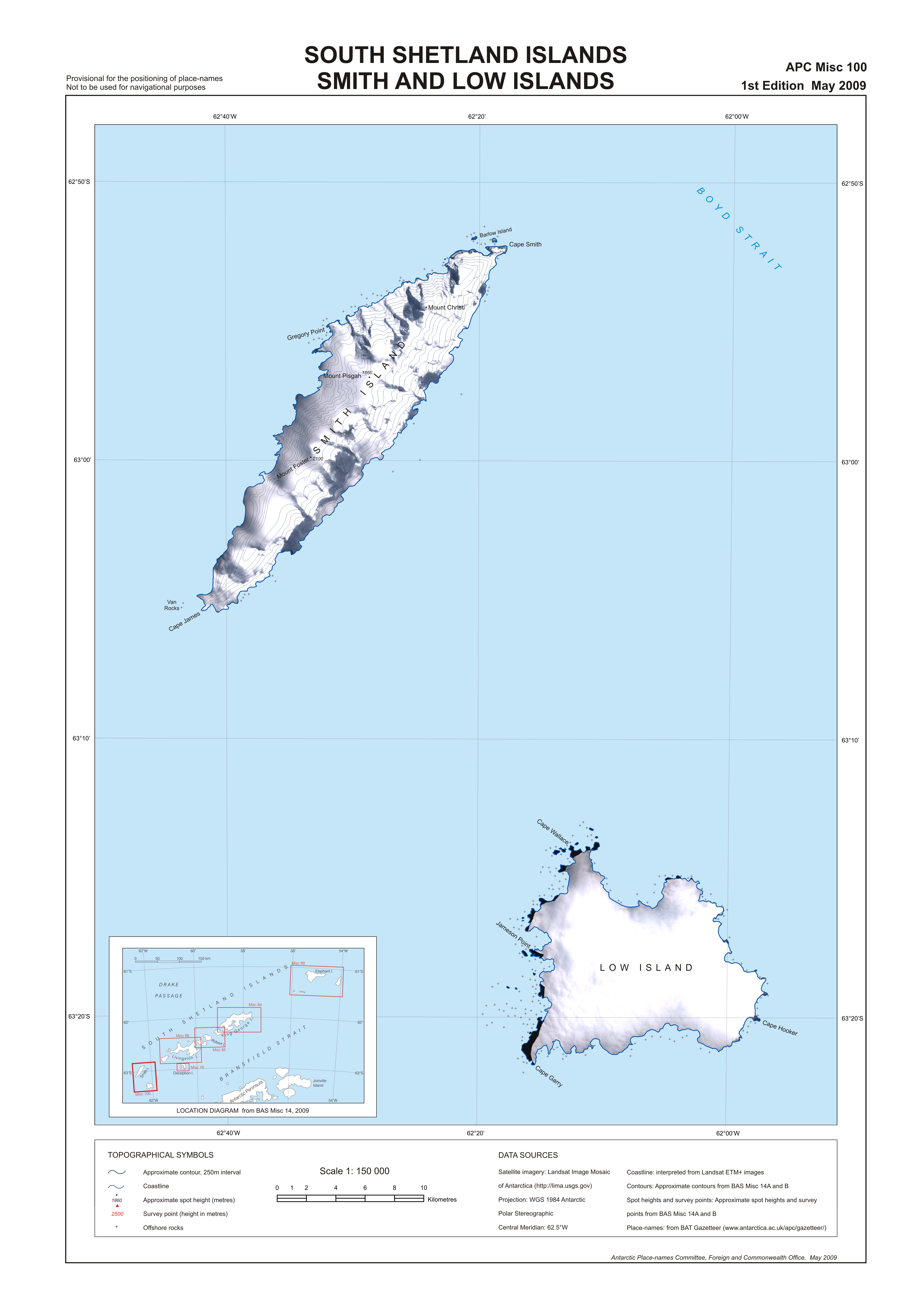
Map of Smith and Low Islands in the South Shetland Islands

- South Shetland Islands: Smith and Low Islands. Scale 1:150000 topographic map No. 13677. British Antarctic Survey, 2009
- Antarctic Digital Database (ADD). Scale 1:250000 topographic map of Antarctica. Scientific Committee on Antarctic Research (SCAR). Since 1993, regularly upgraded and updated
