= Kapinovo, Dobrich Province =

Kapinovo
- Village
- Location in Bulgaria
- Coordinates: 43.759°N 27.977°E
- Country: Bulgaria
- Province: Dobrich Province
- Municipality: General Toshevo Municipality
- Time zone: UTC+2 (EET)
  - Summer (DST): UTC+3 (EEST)

Kapinovo is a village in General Toshevo Municipality, Dobrich Province, in northeastern Bulgaria.
