= List of cave monasteries =

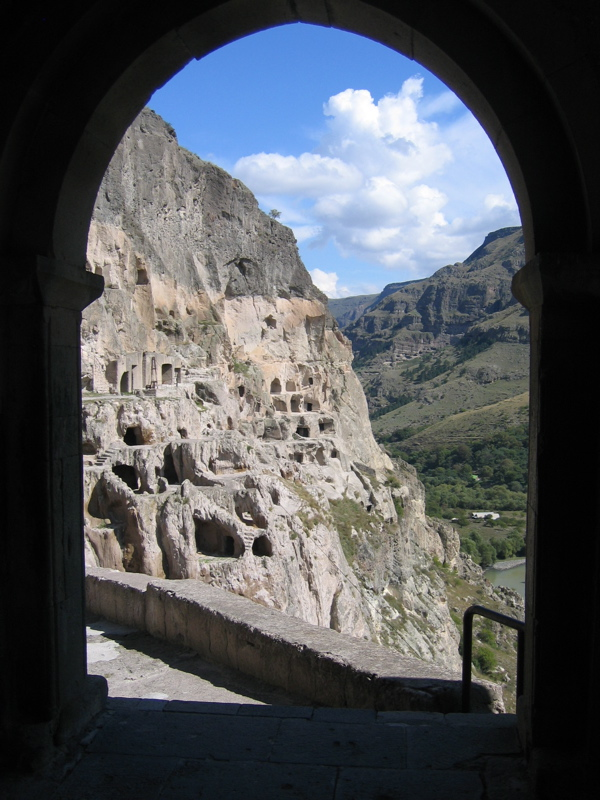
Vardzia Cave Monastery (Georgia)

A cave monastery is a monastery built in caves, with possible outside facilities. The 3rd-century monk St. Anthony the Great, known as the founder of Christian monasticism, lived in a cave.

- Albania
  - Qafthanë Cave Church, cave church near Urakë
  - St. Mary's Church, cave church in Maligrad, an island in the Prespa lake
- Armenia
  - Geghard cave monastery/fortress
- Bosnia and Herzegovina
  - Zavala monastery
- Bulgaria
  - Aladzha Monastery
  - Albotin Monastery
  - Basarbovo Monastery
  - Rock-hewn Churches of Ivanovo
  - Cave monasteries of Krepcha
  - Monasteries of Provadia
  - Cave monasteries on the Plateau of Shumen
  - Cave monasteries of Tervel
- Egypt
  - St. Simon the Tanner Monastery
- Ethiopia
  - Monolithic church
- France
  - Abbey of Saint-Roman, Beaucaire, Gard
- Georgia
  - David Gareja monastery complex
  - Vanis Kvabebi cave monastery/fortress, Javakheti Plateau
  - Vardzia cave city and monastery
- Greece
  - various cave hermitages at Meteora
  - various cave hermitages at Mount Athos
    - caves at Karoulia
  - Monastery of Saint Mark, Petroussa
- Hungary
  - Gellért Hill Cave chapels and monastery, Budapest
- Iraq
  - Rabban Hormizd Monastery, Alqosh
  - Mar Qayuma Monastery, Dooreh
- Israel
  - Qumran Caves, once inhabited by the Essenes
- Japan
  - various cave hermitages at Mount Hiko
- Montenegro
  - Ostrog Monastery
- North Macedonia
  - Kališta Monastery, Struga
- Romania
  - Basarabi Cave Complex
  - Corbii de Piatră
  - Nămăiești
- Russia
  - Monastery of the Caves, Nizhny Novgorod
  - Pskov Cave Monastery, Pskov Oblast
  - Divnogorye and Saviour Convent, Voronezh Oblast
- Serbia
  - Blagoveštenje
  - Crna Reka
  - Gornjak
  - Kađenica
  - Churches of Kovilje Monastery
  - Church of Sts. Peter and Paul, also known as the Cave Church, 14th-century church in Lukovo
  - Church of Sts. Peter and Paul, in Rsovci, where was painted a unique fresco of bald Jesus
  - Hermitage of St. Peter Koriški
  - Savina
- Thailand
  - Wat Tham Khan, Sakon Nakhon province
  - Tiger Cave Temple (Wat Tam Sua), Krabi
- Turkey
  - Cappadocia cave monasteries
  - Cave monastery of İnceğiz
  - Church of Saint Peter
- Ukraine
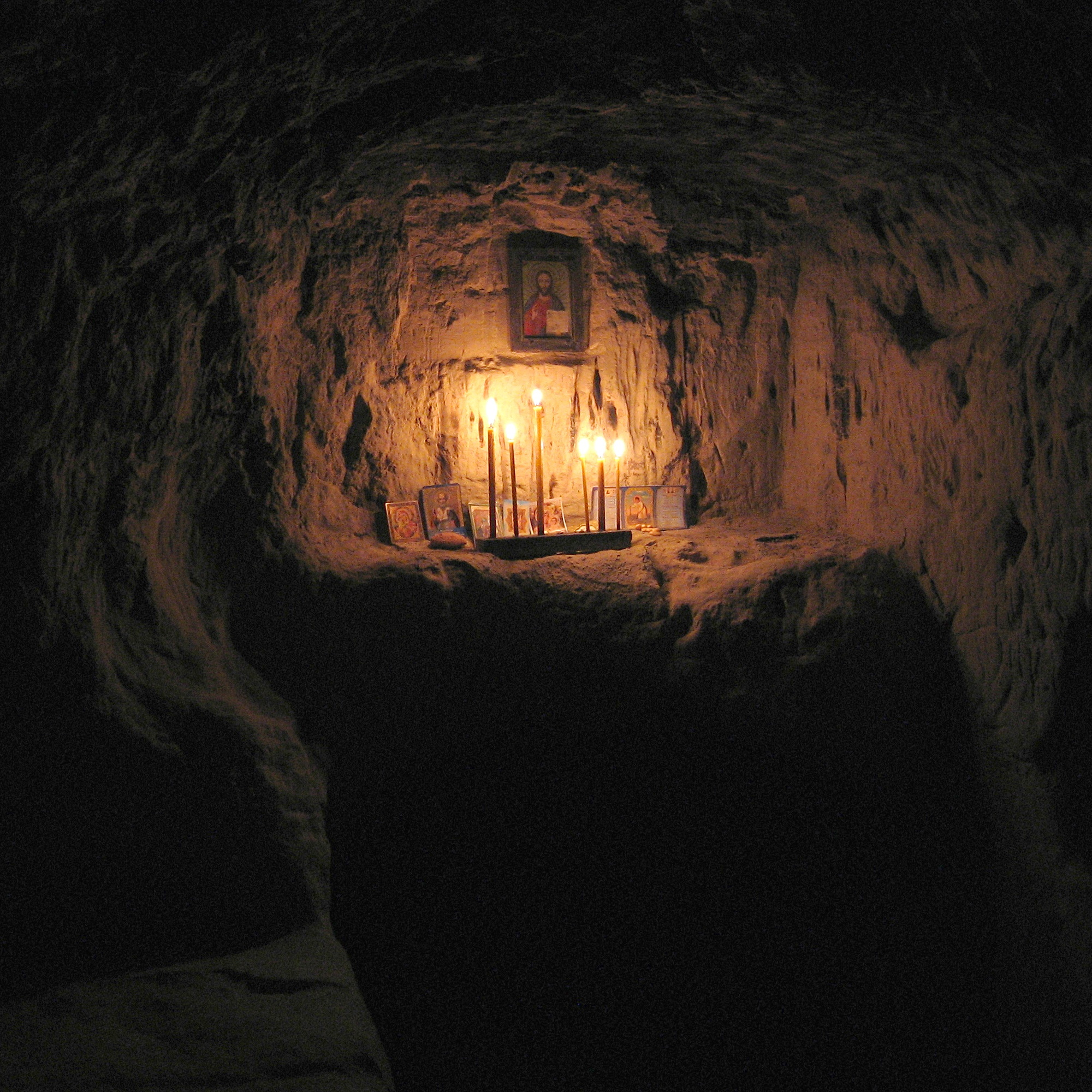
  A cell in the caves of the Kytaiv Monastery
  - Bakhchysarai Cave Monastery in Crimea
  - Chelter-Koba in Crimea
  - Chylter-Marmara in Crimea
  - Inkerman Cave Monastery in Crimea
  - Assumption Cave Monastery in Zymne, Volyn Oblast
  - Bakota Cave Monastery in Bakota, Khmelnytskyi Oblast
  - Kachi-Kalon in Crimea
  - Kyiv Pechersk Lavra (Near and Far Caves) in Kyiv
  - Kytaiv Monastery in Kyiv
  - Shuldan in Crimea
  - Sviatohirsk Lavra in Sviatohirsk, Donetsk Oblast
  - Yeletskyi Monastery (Saint Anthony's Caves) in Chernihiv

== In Bulgaria ==
=== Northeast Bulgaria ===
- Rock monasteries near Ruse
  - Basarbovo Monastery
  - Rock-hewn Churches of Ivanovo
  - Great Nisovo Rock Monastery (Голям Нисовски скален манастир), near Nisovo village
  - Tabachka Cave Church, near Tabachka village
  - Rock monasteries near Cherven village
    - Malkiya Rai Rock Monastery (Скален манастир „Малкия Рай“)
    - Koshuta Rock Monastery (Скален манастир „Кошута“)
    - Golemiya Rai Rock Monastery (Скален манастир „Големия рай“)
    - Moskov Dol Rock Church (Скална църква „Москов Дол“)
  - Krepcha Rock Monastery (Крепченски скален манастир), near Krepcha village
- Rock monasteries near Tervel
  - Rock monasteries near Balik and Onogur villages
    - Asar Evleri Rock Monastery (Скален манастир „Асар евлери“)
    - Gyaur Evleri Rock Monastery (Скален манастир „Гяур евлери“)
    - Sandakli Maara Rock Monastery (Скален манастир „Сандъкли маара“)
    - Tarapanata Rock Monastery (Скална обител „Тарапаната“)
  - Valchanova Staya Rock Hermitage (Скален скит „Вълчанова стая“), near Brestnitsa village
- Varbino Rock Monastery (Скален манастир „Върбино“), near Varbino village
- Haidushki Kashti Rock Monastery (Скален манастир „Хайдушки къщи“), near Kolobar village

=== Provadiya river valley ===
Rock monasteries situated in and around the Provadiya river valley:

- Rock monasteries on the Shumen Plateau
  - Osmar monasteries, near Osmar village
  - Trinity (Troitsa) monasteries, near Troitsa village
  - Hankrumovski Monastery, near Han Krum (Hankrum) village
  - Divdyadovski Monastery, near Divdiyadovo village
  - a 14th-century rock-hewn church on the northwestern edge of Shumen city
- Rock monasteries near Nevsha
  - Gyurebahcha Rock Monastery (Скален манастир „Гюребахча“)
- Petricha Rock Monastery (Скален манастир „Петрича“), near Razdelna, Varna Province
- Kisheshlika Rock Monastery (Скален манастир „Кишешлика“), near Avren, Varna Province
- Rock monasteries around Provadia
  - Shashkanite Rock Monastery (Скален манастир „Шашкъните“)
  - Chukara Rock Monastery (Скален манастир „Чукара“)
  - Holy Archangel Gabriel Rock Chapel (Скален параклис „Св. Архангел Гавраил“)
  - Sara Kaya Rock Monastery (Скален манастир „Саръ кая“)
  - Kara Cave Rock Monastery (Скален манастир „Кара пещера“), just north of Manastir village
  - Rock monasteries near Petrov Dol village
    - St. George Rock Monastery (Скален манастир „Свети Георги“)
    - Golyamata / Big Rock Monastery (Seven Chambers / Hodaviah) (Скален манастир „Голямата канара“)
    - Gradishte Rock Monastery (Скален манастир „Градище“)
  - Tapanite Rock Monastery (Скален манастир „Тъпаните“), near Blaskovo village
  - Rojak rock monasteries: Dzheneviz Kanara Rock Monastery (Скален манастир „Дженевиз канара“) or Golyamata Kanara Rock Monastery (Скален манастир „Голямата канара“), near Rojak village
- Aladzha Monastery near Varna

=== Others ===
- St. Stefan Rock Monastery (Скален манастир „Св. Стефан“), Nikopol
- Rock hermitages near the Krushuna Falls south of Krushuna village
- St. Nicholas Rock Monastery (Gligora) (Скален манастир „Свети Никола“ (Глигора)), near Karlukovo village
- St. Ivan Pusti Monastery (Манастир „Свети Иван Пусти”), near Bistrets, Vratsa Province
- Albotin Monastery, northwestern Bulgaria

== See also ==
- Indian rock-cut architecture
- Monolithic architecture
- Monolithic church
