= Letnitsa =

Letnitsa Летница
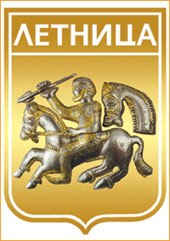
- Coat of arms

- Location of Letnitsa
- Coordinates: 43°19′N 25°04′E
- Country: Bulgaria
- Provinces (Oblast): Lovech

Government
  - Mayor: Krasimir Dzhonev
- Elevation: 85 m (279 ft)

Population (December 2009)
  - Total: 3,739
- Time zone: UTC+2 (EET)
  - Summer (DST): UTC+3 (EEST)
- Postal Code: 5570
- Area code: 06941

Letnitsa (Bulgarian: Летница [ˈlɛtnit͡sɐ], also transliterated Letnitza, Letnica) is a town in central northern Bulgaria, part of Lovech Province. It is the administrative centre of the homonymous Letnitsa Municipality and lies in the northeastern part of the province, close to the town of Levski. As of December 2009, the town had a population of 3,739.

== Economy ==
Several export-focused manufacturers are based or have factories in Letnitsa. As of 2019, exports as a share of the municipality's total production are the second-highest in Bulgaria. The town has among the highest average wages in Bulgaria. Among the largest employers and exporters in the town is Walltopia, which opened its climbing wall manufacturing facility in the town in 2010 and has since expanded it multiple times.

Other companies in Letnitsa are mostly in the food and agriculture industries, the largest of which is frozen foods producer Bulgaria Foods.

== Municipality ==
Letnitsa municipality includes the following four places:

- Gorsko Slivovo
- Karpachevo
- Krushuna
- Letnitsa

== Honour ==
Letnitsa Glacier on Smith Island, South Shetland Islands is named after Letnitsa.
