= Krushuna Falls =

- Крушунски водопад
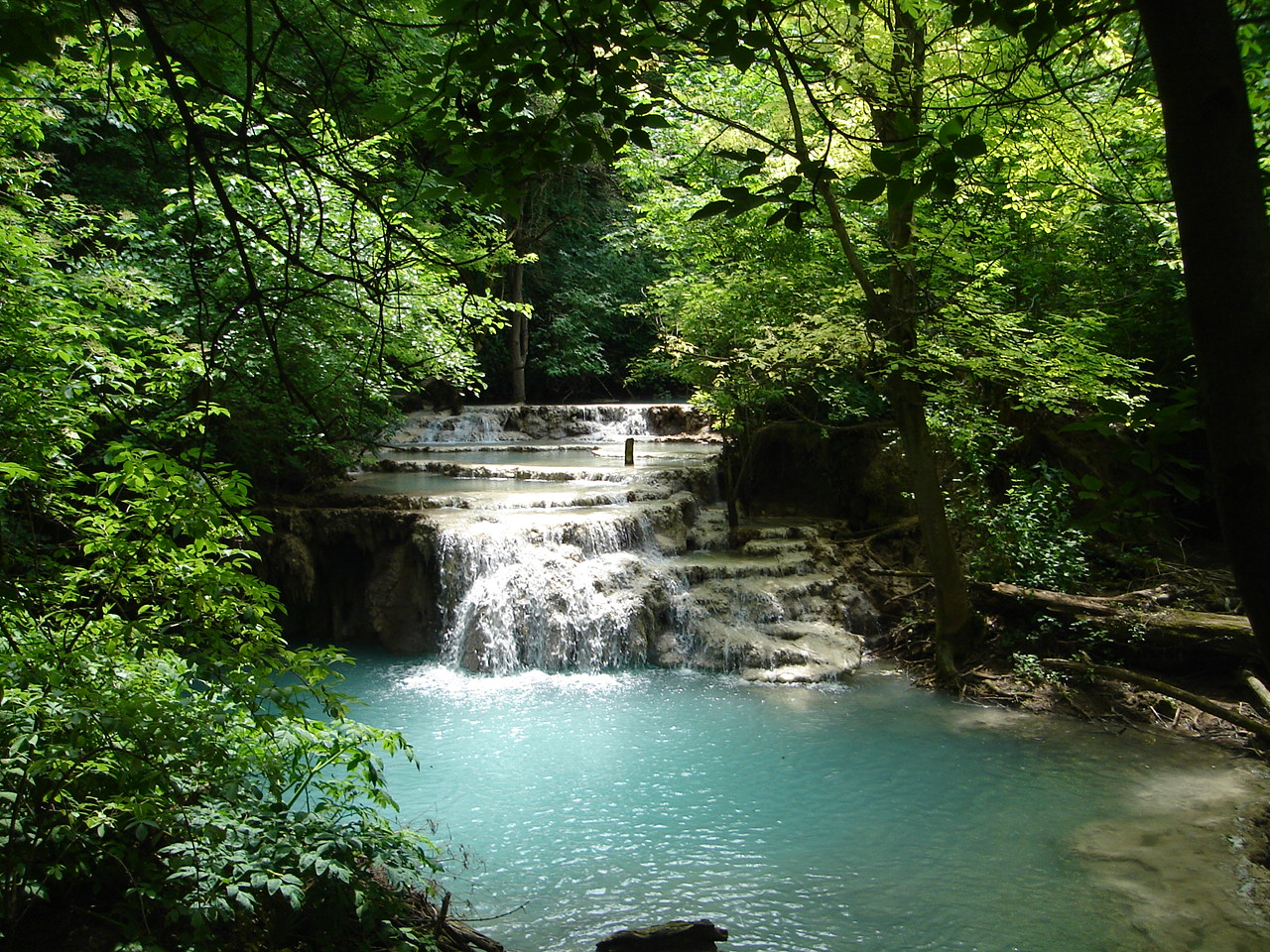
- Interactive map of Krushuna Falls
- Location: Balkan Mountains, Bulgaria
- Type: Travertine

Krushuna Falls (Крушунски водопади) are a series of waterfalls in Northern Bulgaria, near the village of Krushuna, Letnitsa Municipality, 34 km from the city of Lovech. They are carved by the Proynovska River into the travertine (soft limestone) rock.

A tourist path was built in the 2000s, leading to Maarata cave where the river emerges. Remains of the 13-14th century Hesychast Krushuna Monastery dating from the Second Bulgarian Empire can be found nearby.

== See also ==
- List of waterfalls
