= O, Dobrudzhanski Kray =

Bulgarian Military March

O, Dobrudzhanski kray
English: Oh, Dobroudja Land
- О, Добруджански край
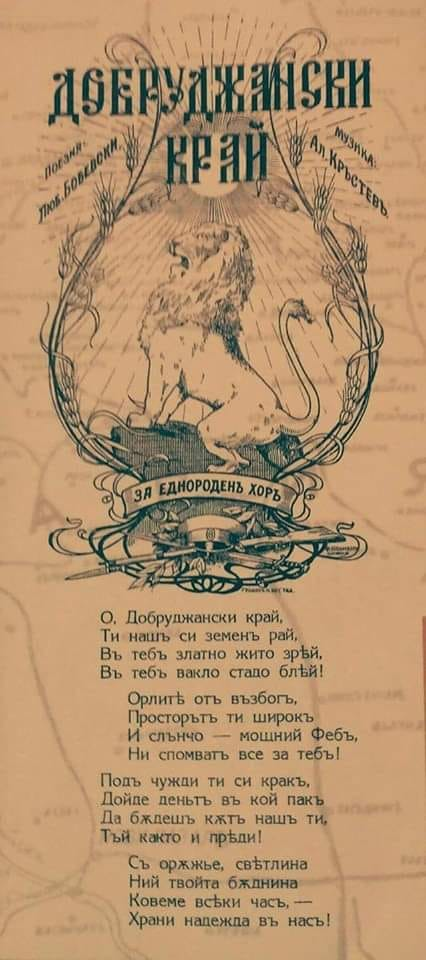
- Lyrics: Lyubomir Bobevski
- Music: Aleksander Kratsev

"O, Dobrudzhanski Kray" (Bulgarian: О, Добруджански край), also referred to as "Oh Dobroudja Land", is a Bulgarian military march composed in 1914 by Aleksander Kratsev and written by poet Lyubomir Bobevski. The piece was popular across Bulgaria until it was banned following the 1944 Bulgarian coup d'état.

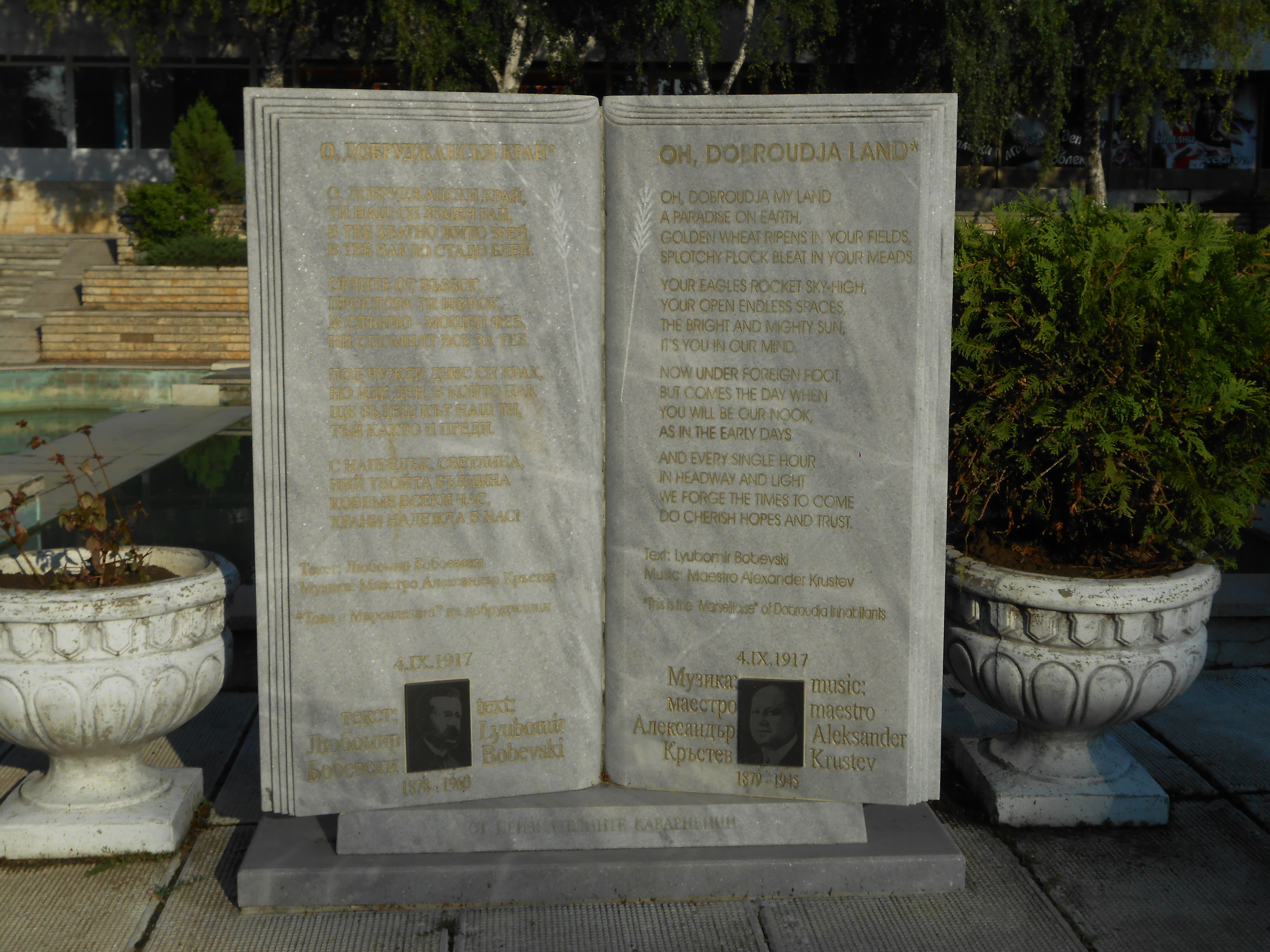
A monument to the march "Oh Dobroudja Land", located in Kavarna, Bulgaria.

Today, the song serves as the anthem for the municipalities of Dobrich and Tervel.

A monument to the march was opened in Kavarna in 2007 in the form of an open marble book. The lyrics to the march were inscribed on the book in Bulgarian and English.

It has been speculated that the melody of South Korea's national anthem Aegukga was inspired by this song.

== Lyrics ==
Bulgarian

О, Добруджански край,
ти нашъ си земенъ рай!
Въ тебъ златно жито зрѣй,
и вакло стадо блѣй!

Орлитѣ отъ възбогъ,
просторътъ ти широкъ,
и слънчо - мощний Фебъ,
ни спомнят все за тебъ!

Подъ чужди бил си кракъ,
дойде деньтъ въ кой пакъ
да бѫдеш кѫтъ нашъ ти,
тъй както и прѣди!

Съ напредък, светлина
ний твойта бѫднина
ковеме всѣки часъ -
храни надежда въ насъ!

О, Добруджански край...
О, Добруджански край!
Ти нашъ си земенъ рай!

Translation:
English

Oh, Dobroudja my land,
A paradise on Earth,
Golden wheat ripens in your fields,
Splotchy flock bleat in your meads,

Your eagles rocket sky high,
Your open endless spaces,
The bright and mighty sun,
It's you in our mind,

Now under foreign foot,
But comes the day when
You will be our nook,
As in the early days

And every single hour
in headway and light
we forge the times to come
do cherish hopes and trust.

Oh, Dobroudja my land...
Oh, Dobroudja my land!
You are our earthly paradise!

== Additional Information ==
The street "Dobrudzhanski krai" (Bulgarian: Добруджански край) in Sofia is named after this march.
