= Bezmer =

Bezmer (Bulgarian: Безмер) may refer to:

- Bezmer, Dobrich Province, a village in Tervel municipality
- Bezmer, Yambol Province, a village in Tundzha municipality
- Bezmer Point, a promontory on the northwest coast of the Varna Peninsula, Livingston Island, in the South Shetland Islands, Antarctica
- Batbayan of Bulgaria, also known as Bezmer, a tsar (khan) of Bulgaria (668-671)
