= Devetashka Cave =

Cave and archaeological site in Bulgaria

Devetàshka Cave
- Деветашката пещера (Bulgarian)
- Devetetashka Site
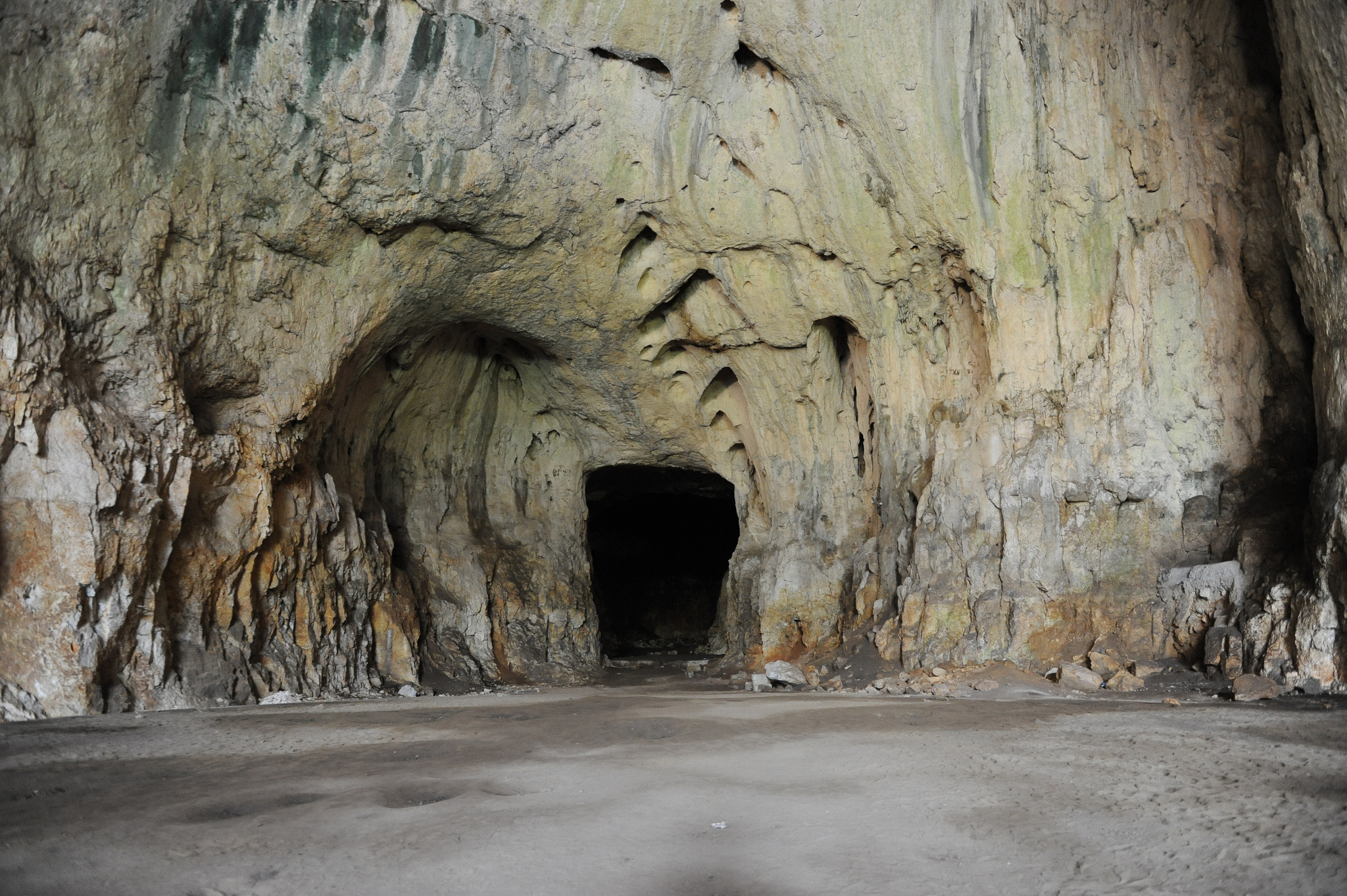
- Bats and crag martins populate the site

- Location in Bulgaria
- 43°14′11″N 24°53′44″E
- Associated with: paleo-humans
- Location: near Letnitsa and Lovech town
- Region: Bulgaria

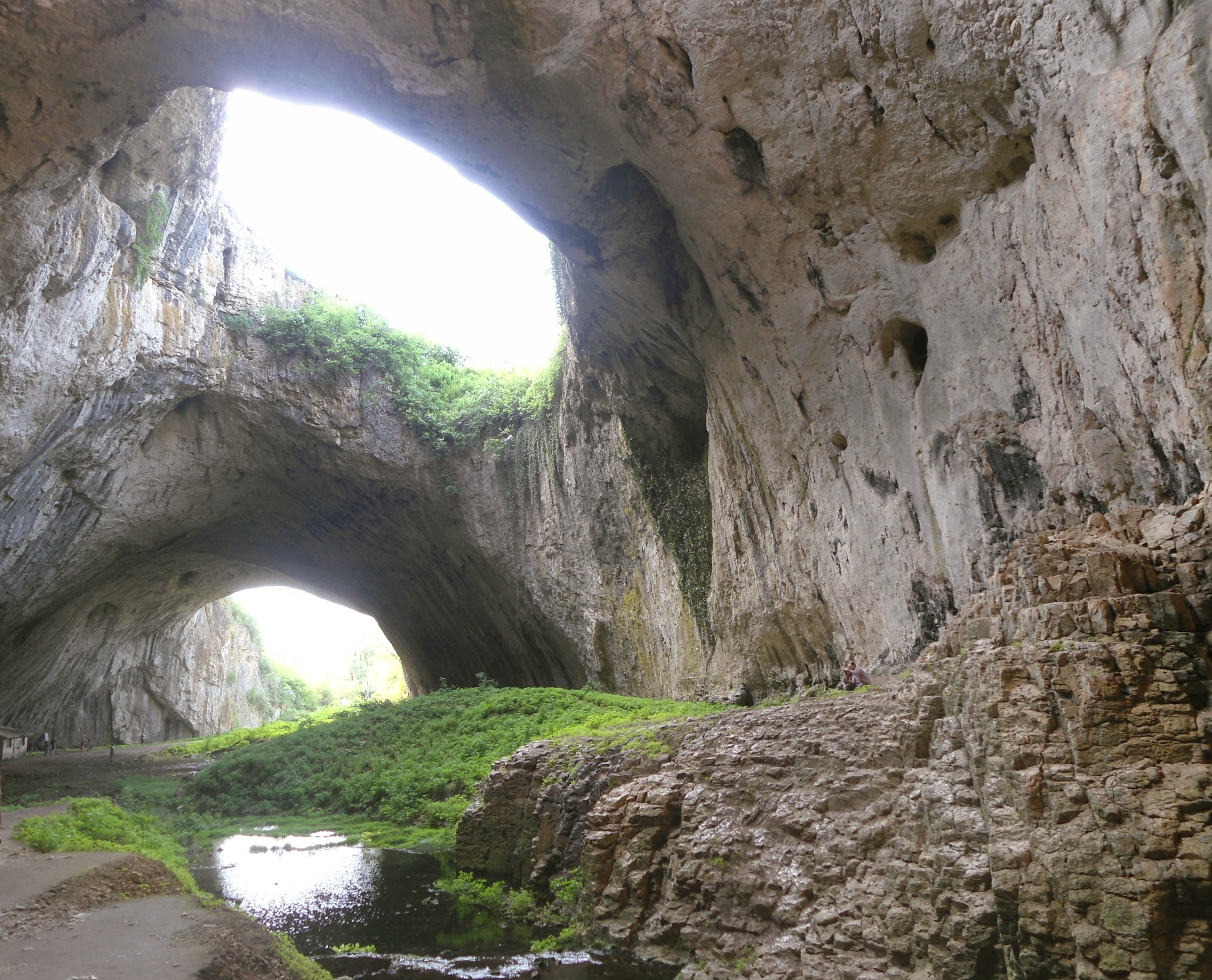
View towards the main entrance and the first two openings

Devetàshka Cave (Bulgarian: Деветашката пещера) is a large karst cave around 15 km (9.3 mi) southwest of Letnitsa and 15 km (9.3 mi) northeast of Lovech, near the village of Devetaki on the east bank of the river Osam, in Bulgaria. The site was continuously occupied by paleo-humans for tens of thousands of years, served as a shelter for a variety of animal species during extensive periods and is now home to nearly 30,000 bats.

== Location ==
Devetashka Cave is located approximately 2 km (1.2 mi) from the village of Devetaki. A narrow path by the river leads from the village to the cave. It can also be accessed directly via Road 301 along a 400 m (1,300 ft) long dirt road and a concrete bridge. Now part of a public park, that includes a waterfall, the 2 km (1.2 mi) long karst cave formed from the dissolution of soluble rocks, characterized by sinkholes and an underground river. It contains a large number of speleothems, stalagmites, stalactites, rivulets and natural domes.

The site is 35 m (115 ft) wide and 30 m (98 ft) high at the entrance. The cave widens after around 40 m (130 ft), forming a spacious hall with an area of 2,400 m^{2} (26,000 sq ft), a height of 60 m (200 ft) that can reach up to 100 m (330 ft). Several large openings in the ceiling allow daylight in due to commercial use of the site during the 1950s.

Rediscovered in 1921, excavations began only in the 1950s and revealed almost continuous human occupation since the late Paleolithic. Earliest traces of human presence date back to the Middle Paleolithic around 70,000 years ago. The site also contained one of the richest sources of Neolithic cultural artifacts (6,000 to 4,000 BC).

== Fauna ==
Besides significant archaeological findings, Devetashka cave provides a habitat for a wide diversity of animal residents. During the breeding season of mammalian species in the cave from early June to the end of July, the site is entirely closed to visitors. Twelve species of protected amphibians and reptiles, including the Aesculapian snake (Zamenis longissimus), the Triturus (Triturus cristatus), the European tree frog (Hyla arborea), Hermann's tortoise (Testudo hermanni), eighty-two bird species can be found in the area, thirteen of which are included in the Red List. Thirty-four species of mammals, four of which are included in the Red List and fifteen species of bats are to be found at the Devetashka cave.

== Filming ==
Devetashka Cave was shown in the action movie The Expendables 2, filmed in 2011. The Supreme Administrative Court of Bulgaria declared that several activities during filming violated Bulgaria's environmental regulations. A contractor hired by The Expendables crew was subsequently fined for trimming the shrubbery in front of the site. After a fatal accident during the filming of a stunt, the production team again clashed with the authorities over damages to the cave. Loud noises, bright lights, crowds of people and fires in close proximity to the cave might have caused the displacement of large numbers of bats from the cave. However, by late 2012, the majority of the bats had returned to the cave.
