= Savina Monastery =

Savina is the name of following Serbian Orthodox monasteries:

- Savina Monastery (Serbia), cave monastery in southern Serbia
- Savina Monastery (Montenegro)
