= Onogur =

Onogur may refer to:

- Onogur, Bulgaria, a village in Dobrich Province
- Onogur Islands, Antarctica
- Onoğurs, members of a Hunno-Bulgar state around the Sea of Azov
