= Brestnitsa =

Brestnitsa refers to the following places in Bulgaria:

- Brestnitsa, Dobrich Province
- Brestnitsa, Lovech Province
