= Abbey of Saint-Roman =

Abbey in Beaucaire and Comps, France

Coordinates: 43°50′7″N 4°36′41″E

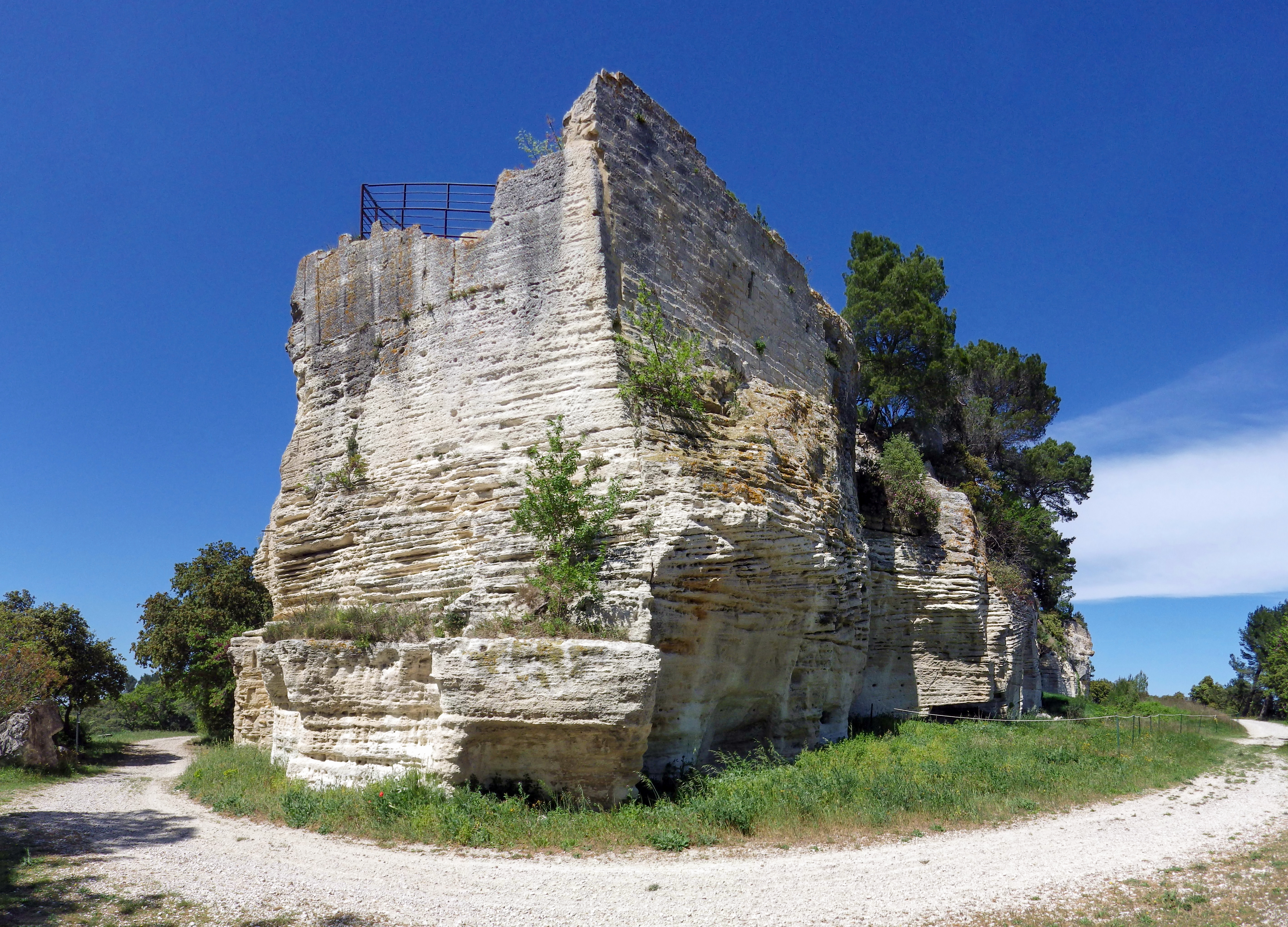
The rock which contains the monastery

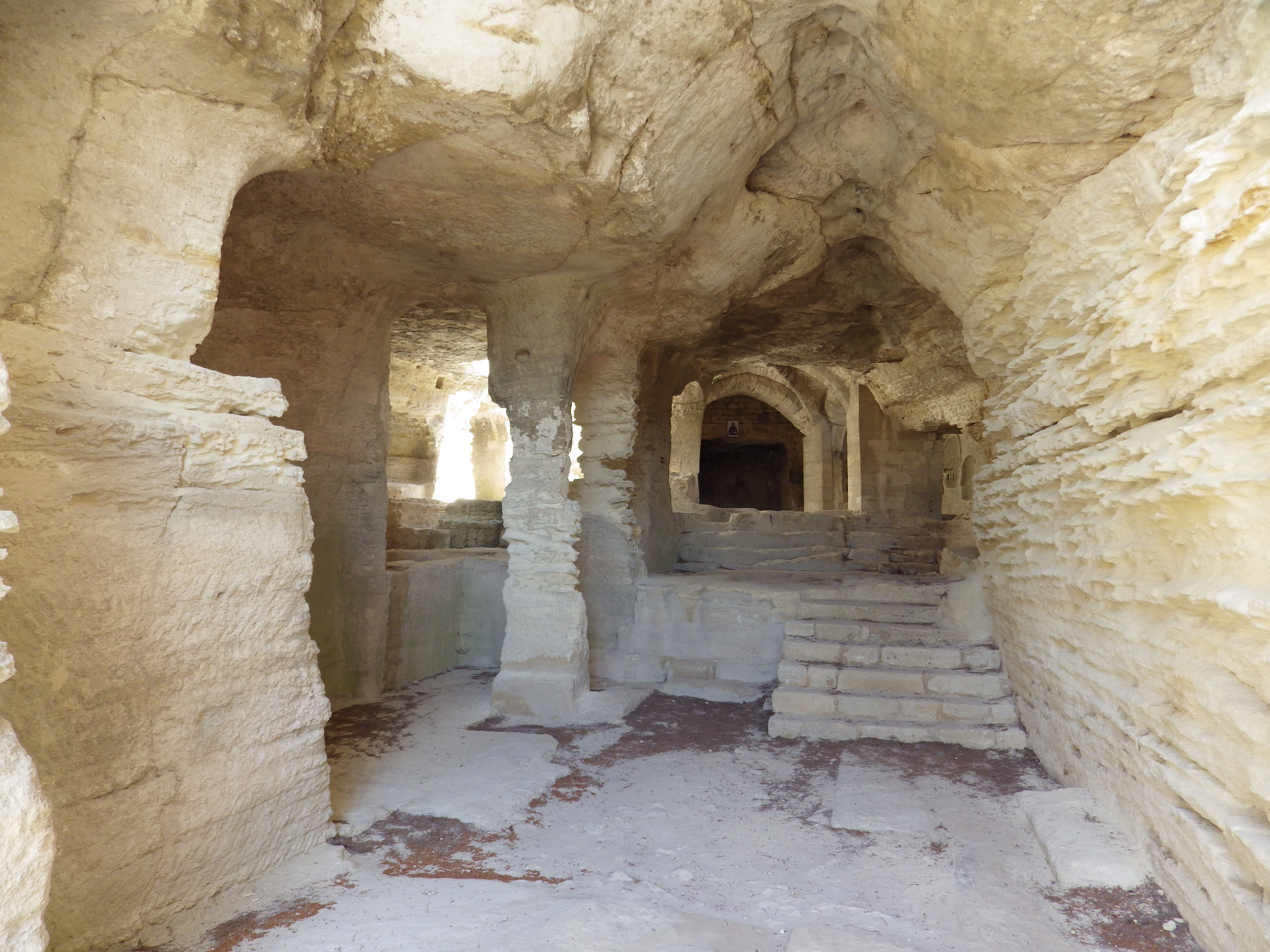
Abbey of Saint-Roman

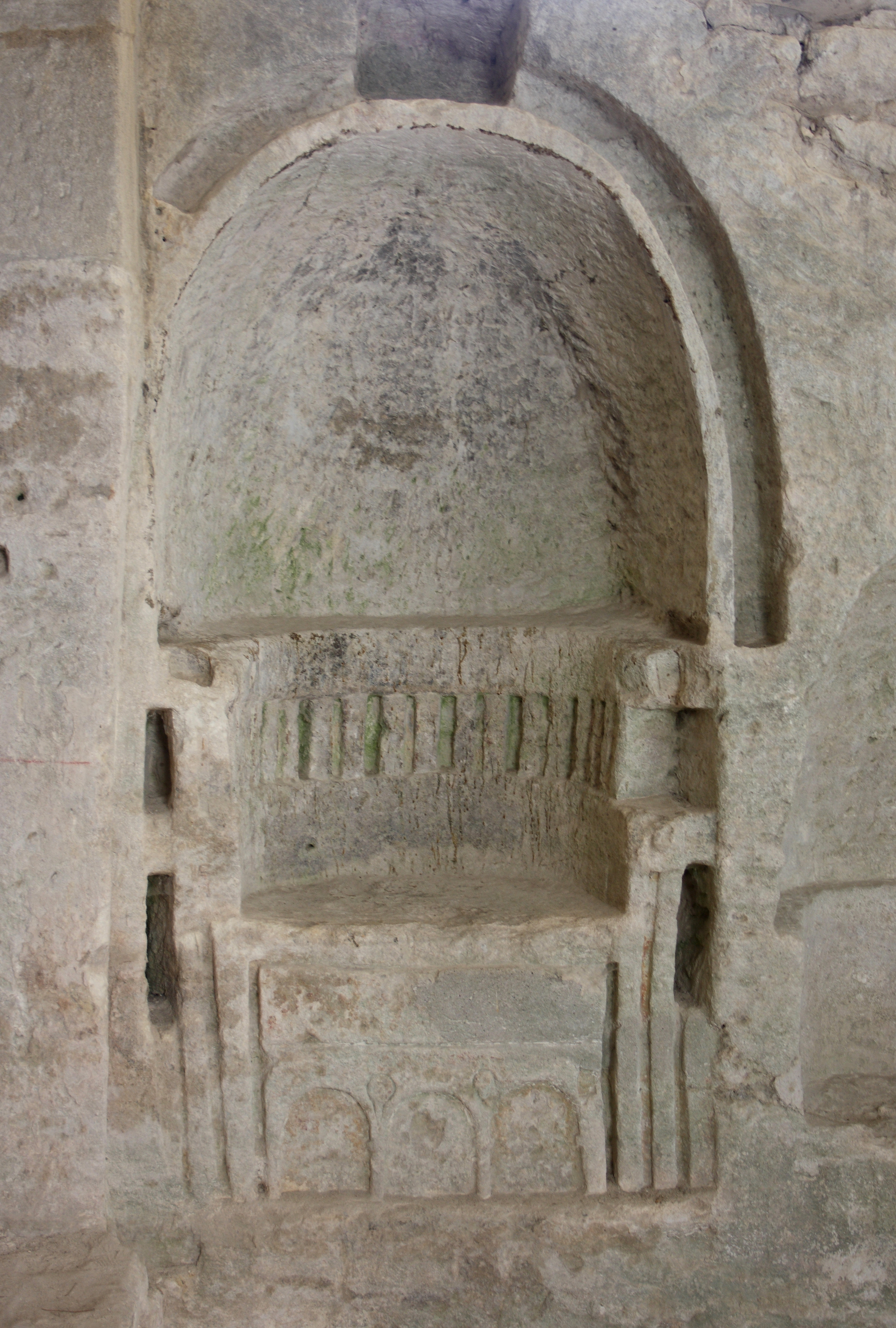
12th century abbot's seat

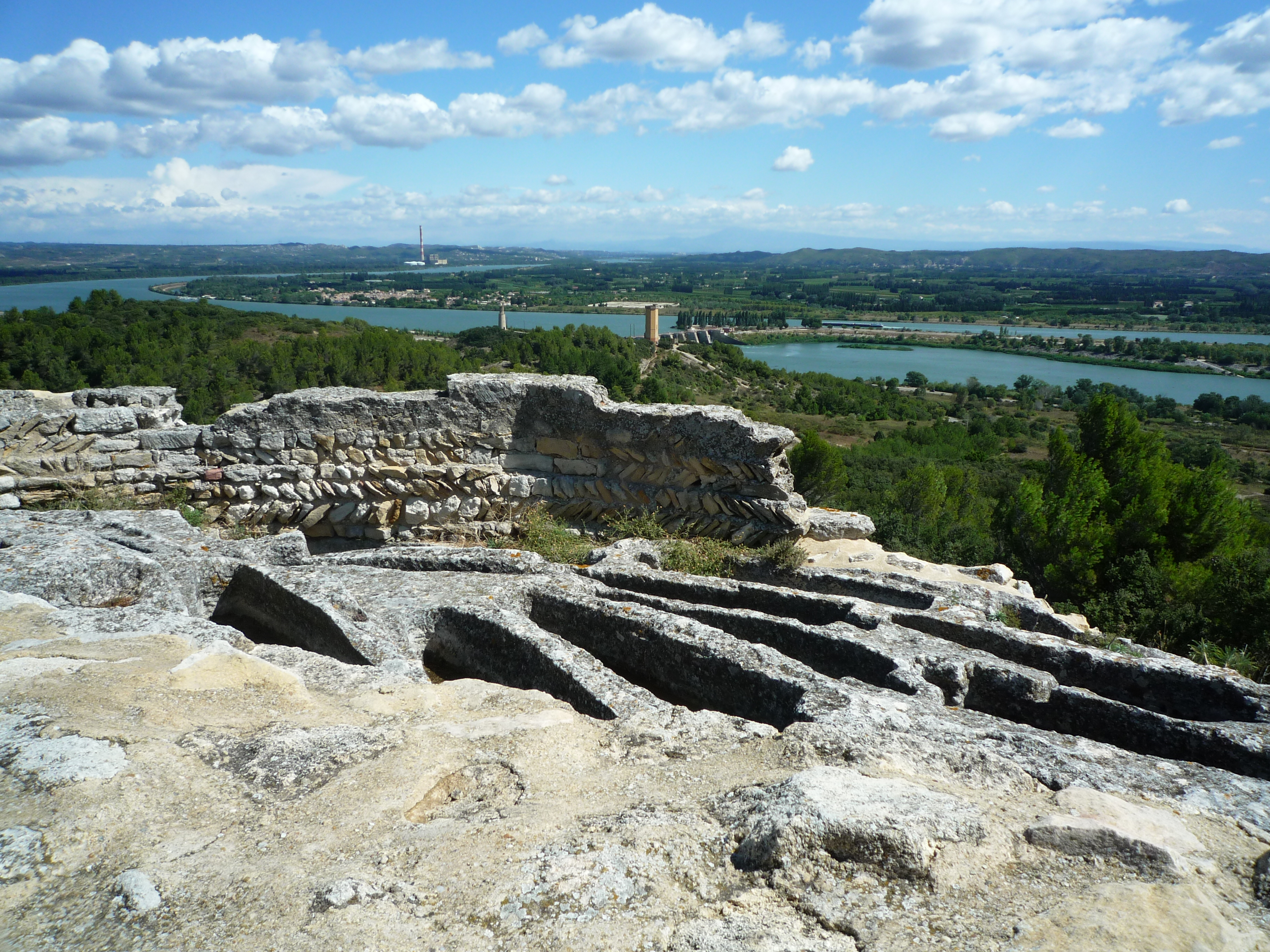
View over the Rhône River from the necropolis of Abbey of Saint-Roman

The Abbey of Saint-Roman (French: Abbaye de Saint-Roman) is a cave monastery located in the communes of Beaucaire and Comps, in the Gard département of France.

The site, which includes the ruins of a castle, the château de Saint-Roman-d'Aiguille, has been protected by the French Ministry of Culture as a monument historique since 1990 and includes a chapel, cloisters, terrace, tombs and walls. It was constructed in the 9th, 10th, 12th and 15th centuries.
