= Orlyak =

- Village
- Location within Bulgaria
- Coordinates: 43°38′10″N 27°22′55″E
- Country: Bulgaria
- Province: Dobrich Province
- Municipality: Tervel

Population (2009)
  - Total: 1,922
- Time zone: UTC+2 (EET)
  - Summer (DST): UTC+3 (EEST)

Orlyak, Dobrich Province is a village in Tervel Municipality, Dobrich Province, in northeastern Bulgaria.

== Demography ==
The following table shows the change of the population during the last four decades.

Orlyak Municipality
Year	1975	1985	1992	2001	2005	2007	2009	2011
Population		3490	1982	1824	1886	1902	1922	...
Sources: Census 2001, Census 2011, „pop-stat.mashke.org“,
