= Tervel Municipality =

Tervel Municipality Община Тервел
- Municipality
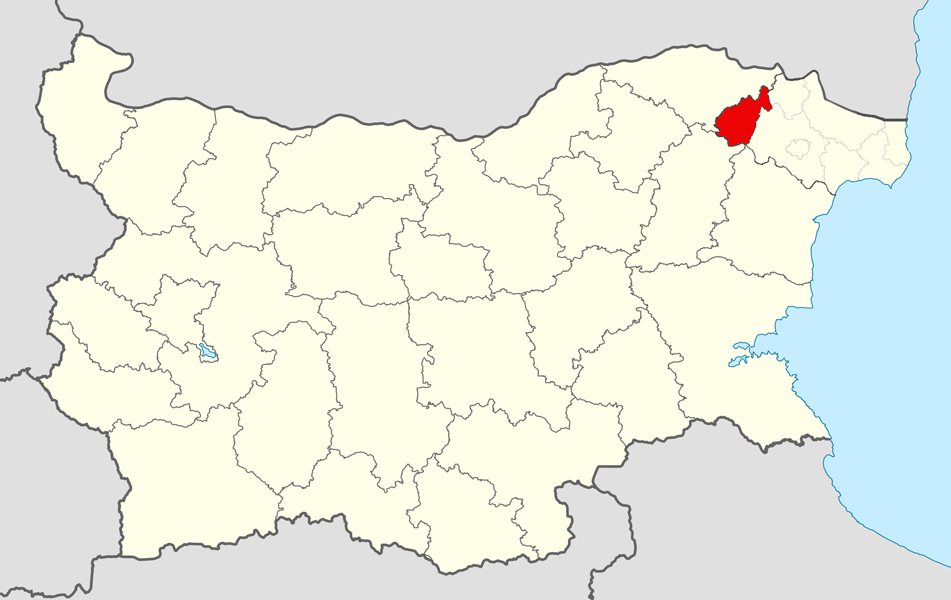
- Tervel Municipality within Bulgaria and Dobrich Province.
- Coordinates: 43°44′N 27°21′E
- Country: Bulgaria
- Province (Oblast): Dobrich
- Admin. centre (Obshtinski tsentar): Tervel

Area
  - Total: 579.7 km^{2} (223.8 sq mi)

Population (December 2009)
  - Total: 17,458
  - Density: 30.12/km^{2} (78.00/sq mi)
- Time zone: UTC+2 (EET)
  - Summer (DST): UTC+3 (EEST)

Tervel Municipality (Bulgarian: Община Тервел) is a municipality (obshtina) in Dobrich Province, Northeastern Bulgaria, located in Southern Dobruja geographical region, about 30 km south of Danube river. It is named after its administrative centre, the town of Tervel.

The municipality has a territory of 579.7 km^{2} (223.8 sq mi), with a population of 17,458, as of December 2009.

More significant tourist sights in the area include the early Byzantine cave monasteries around the villages of Balik and Brestnitsa dating to the 5th-6th century.

== Settlements ==
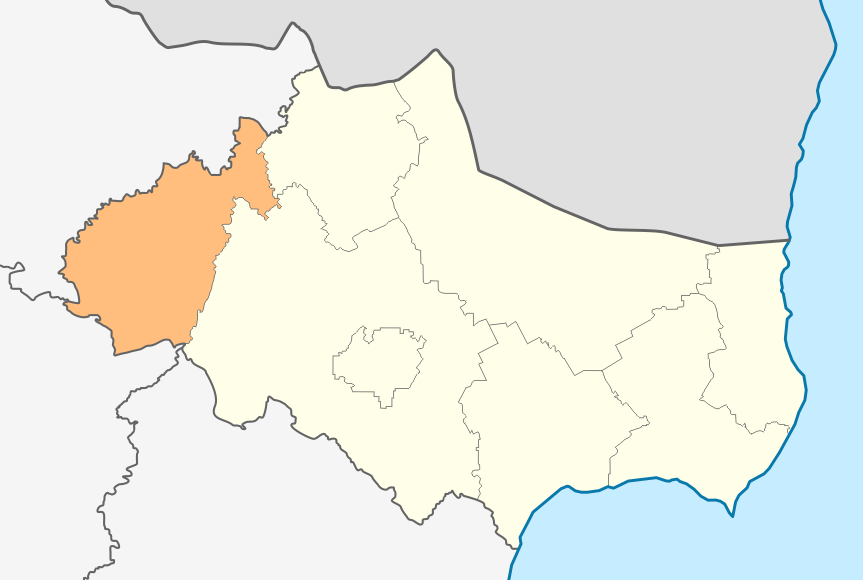
Tervel Municipality within Dobrich Province

Tervel Municipality includes the following 26 places; all of them are villages:

Town/Village	Cyrillic	Population (December 2009)
Tervel	Тервел	6667
Angelariy	Ангеларий	145
Balik	Балик	261
Bezmer	Безмер	1229
Bozhan (village)	Божан	598
Bonevo	Бонево	82
Brestnitsa, Dobrich Province	Брестница	16
Chestimensko	Честименско	412
Glavantsi	Главанци	131
Gradnitsa, Dobrich Province	Градница	405
Guslar	Гуслар	24
Kableshkovo	Каблешково	575
Kladentsi, Dobrich Province	Кладенци	173
Kolartsi	Коларци	688
Kochmar	Кочмар	301
Mali izvor	Мали извор	39
Nova Kamena	Нова Камена	482
Onogur	Оногур	39
Orlyak, Dobrich Province	Орляк	1922
Polkovnik Savovo	Полковник Савово	188
Popgruevo	Попгруево	680
Profesor Zlatarski	Професор Златарски	33
Surnets	Сърнец	209
Voynikovo	Войниково	11
Zarnevo	Зърнево	1222
Zheglartsi	Жегларци	926
Total		17,458

== Demography ==
The municipality has a mixed population consisting mostly of Turks (40.60% according to 2011 census data), Bulgarians (37.06%) and Romani (11.12%).

The following table shows the change of the population during the last four decades.

Tervel Municipality
Year	1975	1985	1992	2001	2005	2007	2009	2011
Population	28,626	28,717	21,483	18,728	17,995	17,780	17,458	...
Sources: Census 2001, Census 2011, „pop-stat.mashke.org“,

=== Religion ===
According to the latest Bulgarian census of 2011, the religious composition, among those who answered the optional question on religious identification, was the following:

Religious composition of Tervel Municipality
Orthodox Christianity	36.0%
Catholicism	0.3%
Protestantism	0.2%
Islam	52.8%
No religion	3.9%
Prefer not to answer, others and indefinable	6.8%

== See also ==
- Provinces of Bulgaria
- Municipalities of Bulgaria
- List of cities and towns in Bulgaria
