= Zarnevo =

- Village
- Location in Bulgaria
- Coordinates: 43°37′48″N 27°18′29″E
- Country: Bulgaria
- Province: Dobrich Province
- Municipality: Tervel
- Time zone: UTC+2 (EET)
  - Summer (DST): UTC+3 (EEST)

Zarnevo is a village in Tervel Municipality, Dobrich Province, in northeastern Bulgaria.
