= Chestimensko =

- Village
- Location within Bulgaria
- Coordinates: 43°47′N 27°22′E
- Country: Bulgaria
- Province: Dobrich Province
- Municipality: Tervel
- Time zone: UTC+2 (EET)
  - Summer (DST): UTC+3 (EEST)

Chestimensko is a village in Tervel Municipality, Dobrich Province, in northeastern Bulgaria.
