= Albotin Monastery =

Coordinates: 43°59′31″N 22°33′35″E

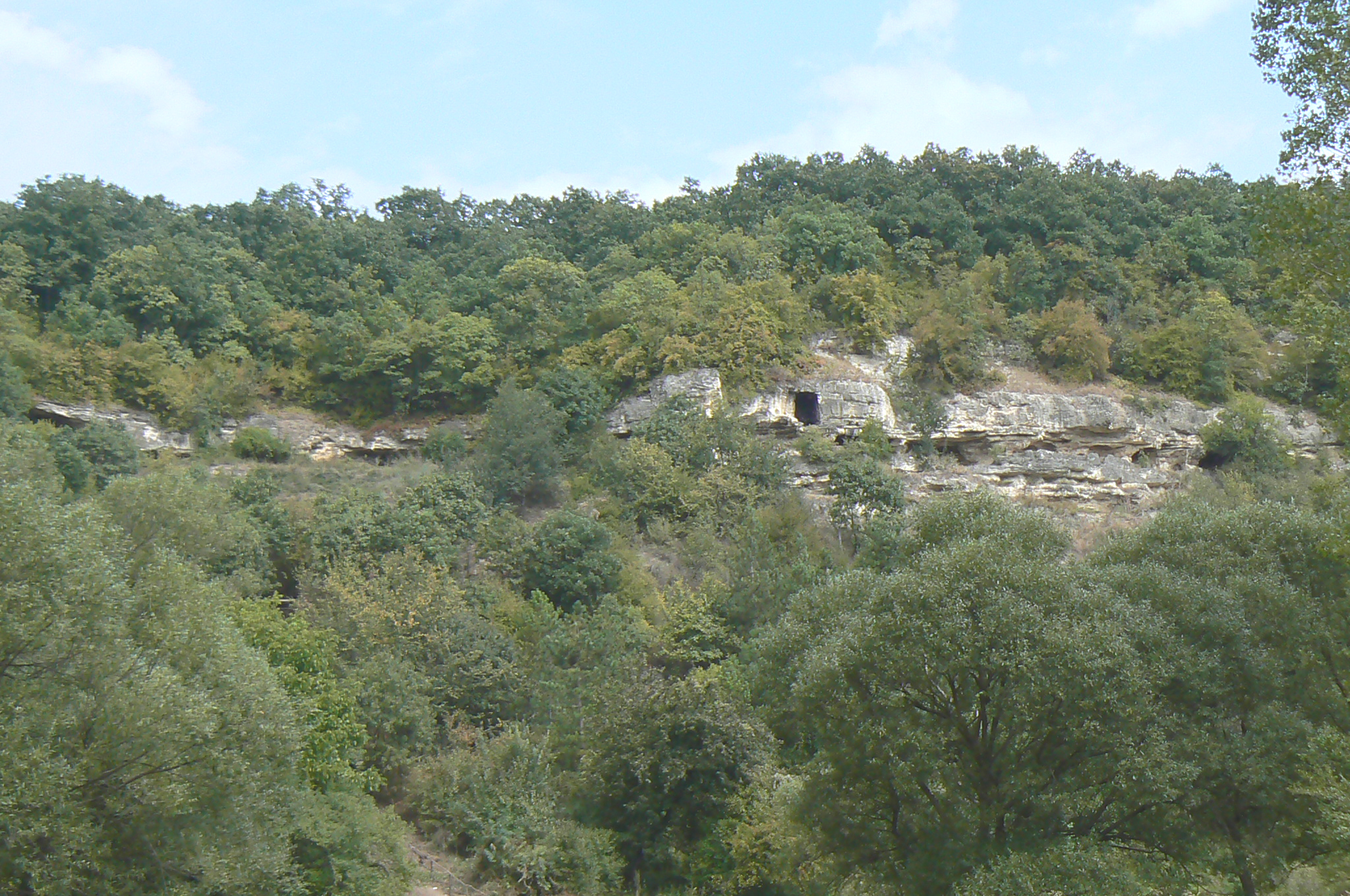
Bottom-up view to the monastery

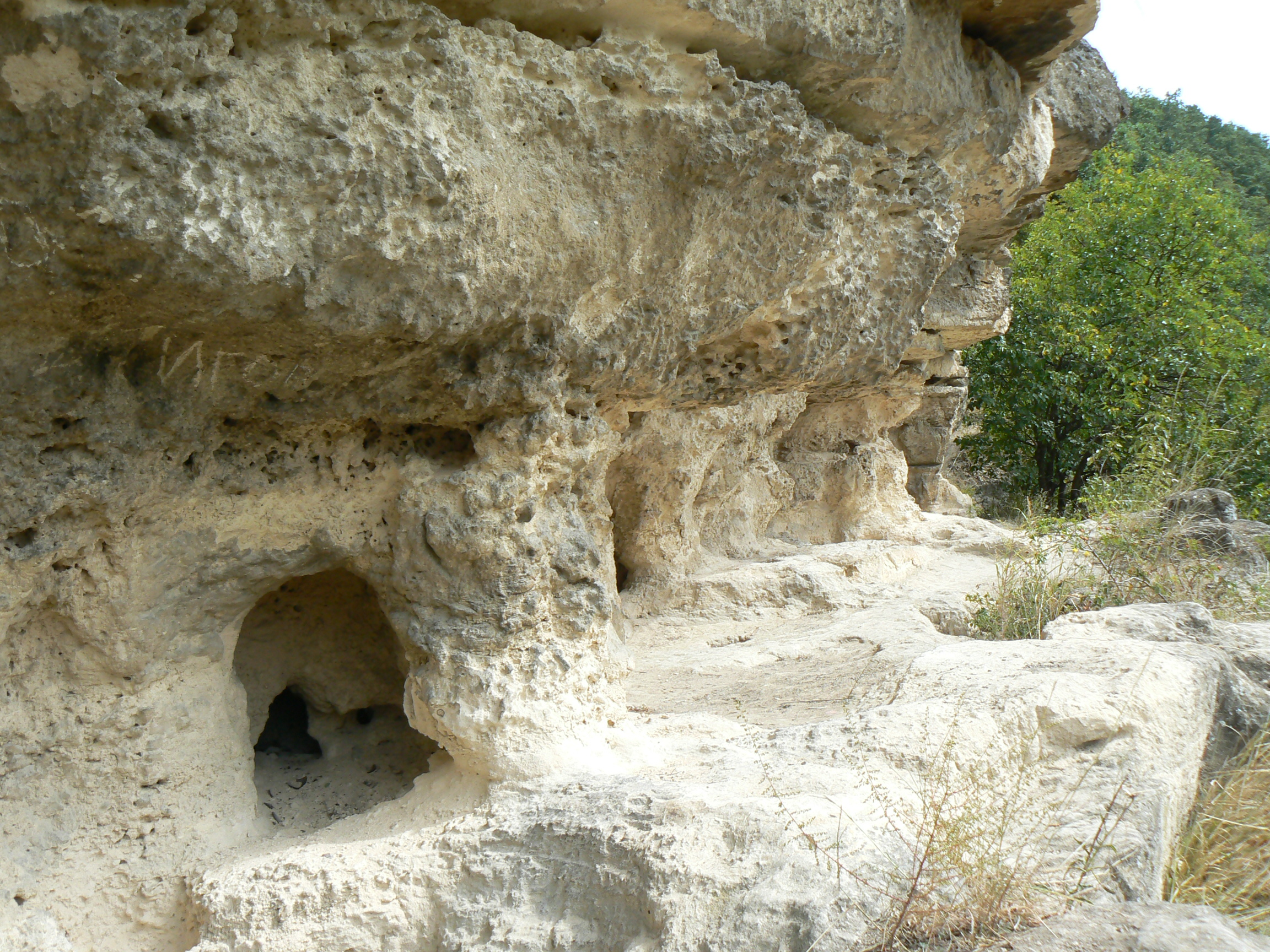
View to the monastery from the entrance

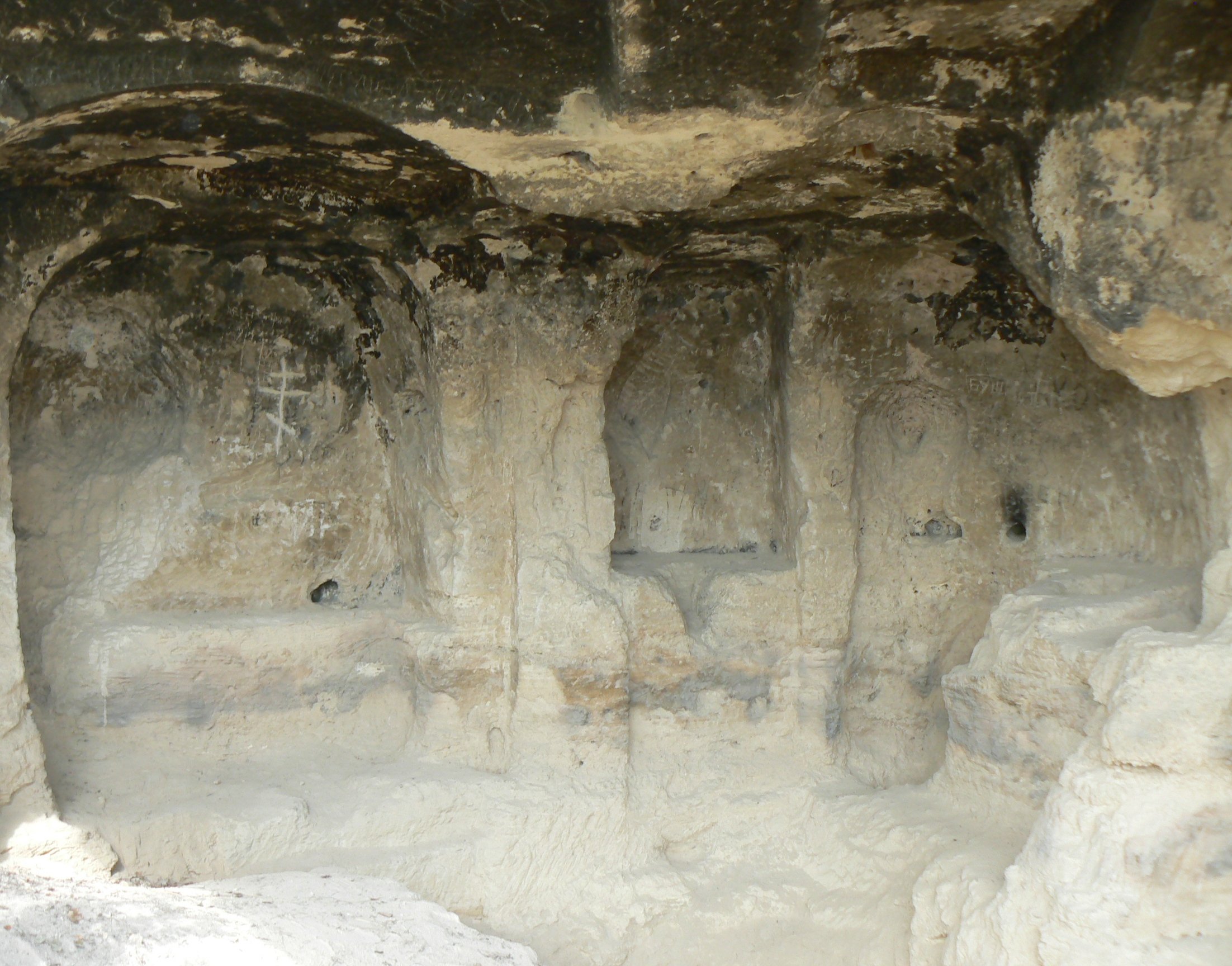
Rock-hewn niches of religious purposes

Albotin Monastery (Bulgarian: Алботински манастир, also: Albutin Monastery, Албутински манастир) is a presently inactive Bulgarian medieval cave monastery on the territory of Kula bishopric of Vidin Diocese of Bulgarian Orthodox Church, in the locality Albotin (Albutin) along river Topolovets between villages Gradets and Rabrovo, nearby village Deleyna.

The monastery complex was built in the limestone rock massif on the northern side of the river, on some 25 metres height, using shallow natural caves and rock sheds, with additionally hewn premises and niches with religious and every-day purposes. The monastery is reached by a steep and narrow sandy pathway in the beginning of which was constructed a water tap, known as Haiduk cheshma. Being easily accessible, in later times the cave monastery was used by shepherds and stone-cutters as a shelter, and robbed and vandalized by treasure-hunters.

Albotin monastery was active in the 14th century according to the account of the preserved fragments of frescoes and inscriptions, as well as adornments (earrings, tabs, bracelets) found in the 29 discovered Christian graves. The large number of burials of laity among the clergymen is an evidence that the monastery was a reputable sanctuary and a desired place for the eternal peace of its donors. Among the scarce historic records, it is noteworthy the mentioning of the nowadays non-existent village Altovin in a registry of Vidin kaaza (district) from year 1560.

The monastery complex consists of eight premises in a row, with the church located in the middle sector, in the most concave part of the rock massif curve. The church contains three naves and is oriented according to the canon from west to east, its southern and southwestern parts being fully devastated. The presence of a baptisterium bespeaks of the temple being used not only for monastic praying but also for public liturgies. In the north-western of the monastery, there is a second floor, containing the second largest premise of the monastery, which was presumably used for a refectory. Other premises were located in the western part of the monastery : the monks cells, kitchen, cellar, store-rooms. Two water tanks can also be seen.

The name of the monastery church is unknown, but there are suppositions that it was devoted to the Resurrection of Jesus, due to the preserved old tradition of playing chain dances (horo) in the memory of the deceased on the second day of Easter. This custom is widely observed by Vlachs who hang the portraits of their dead relatives on the branches of a venerable tree in the meadow under the monastery. Each of the chain dances played before noon-time is devoted to a separate dead man, and the afternoon dances are devoted to the living people. Bulgarians and Vlachs pick up dictamnus and hand out a sprig per each deceased relative.

The Albotin cave monastery was announced monument of culture in the Bulgarian state gazette on 28 December 1927, Issue 221, and on 26 December 1969, Issue 100.

== See also ==
- Aladzha Monastery
- Basarbovo Monastery
- Rock-hewn Churches of Ivanovo
