= Angelariy =

- Village
- Location within Bulgaria
- Coordinates: 43°50′N 27°32′E
- Country: Bulgaria
- Province: Dobrich Province
- Municipality: Tervel
- Time zone: UTC+2 (EET)
  - Summer (DST): UTC+3 (EEST)

Angelariy (Bulgarian: Ангеларий [aŋɡɛˈɫarij]) is a village in Tervel Municipality, Dobrich Province, northeastern Bulgaria. Before 1942, it was named Soyaklii (Сояклии [sojɐˈklii]).
