= Gradnitsa, Dobrich Province =

- Village
- Location within Bulgaria
- Coordinates: 43°43′N 27°13′E
- Country: Bulgaria
- Province: Dobrich Province
- Municipality: Tervel

Population (2011)
  - Total: ▼352
- Time zone: UTC+2 (EET)
  - Summer (DST): UTC+3 (EEST)

Gradnitsa, Dobrich Province is a village in Tervel Municipality, Dobrich Province, in northeastern Bulgaria.

The village has 352 inhabitants as of 2011 and is mainly inhabited by ethnic Turks. Most people are Muslim.
