= Kovilje =

Kovilje Ковиље
- Village
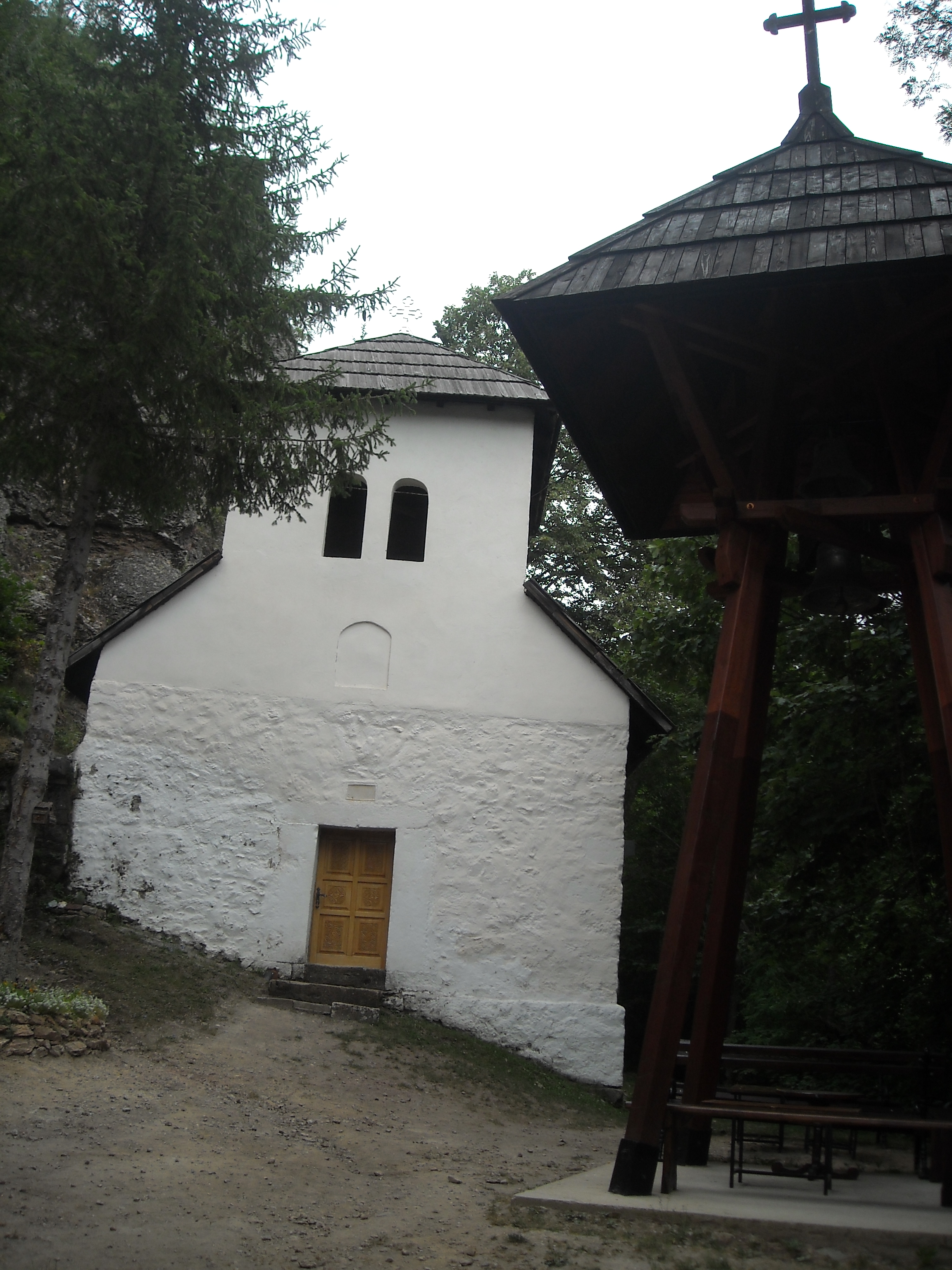
- Kovilje Monastery

- Location within Serbia
- Coordinates: 43°26′04″N 20°11′20″E
- Country: Serbia
- District: Moravica District
- Municipality: Ivanjica

Area
  - Total: 4.40 km^{2} (1.70 sq mi)

Population (2011)
  - Total: 18
  - Density: 4.1/km^{2} (11/sq mi)
- Time zone: UTC+1 (CET)
  - Summer (DST): UTC+2 (CEST)

Kovilje (Serbian Cyrillic: Ковиље) is a village in the municipality of Ivanjica, Serbia. According to the 2011 census, the village has a population of 18 inhabitants. It is situated between Mountains Golija and Javor in central Serbia.

The village is famous for the Orthodox Kovilje monastery founded in 12th century.
