= Kableshkovo, Dobrich Province =

Kableshkovo
- Village
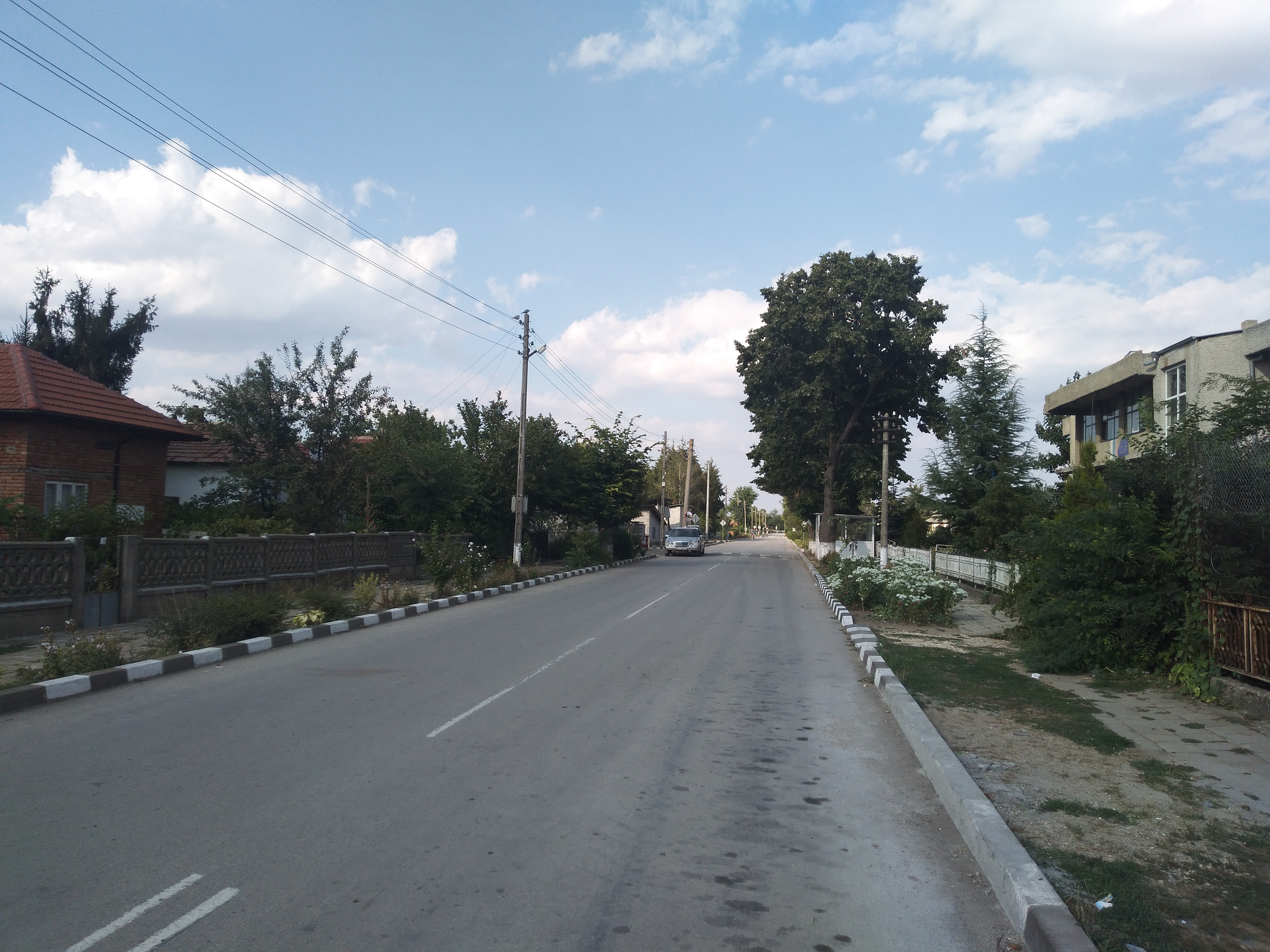

- Location in Bulgaria
- Coordinates: 43°45′05″N 27°18′40″E
- Country: Bulgaria
- Province: Dobrich Province
- Municipality: Tervel
- Time zone: UTC+2 (EET)
  - Summer (DST): UTC+3 (EEST)

Kableshkovo is a village in Tervel Municipality, Dobrich Province, in northeastern Bulgaria.
