= Tervel (town) =

Tervel Тервел
- Location of Tervel
- Coordinates: 43°45′N 27°24′E
- Country: Bulgaria
- Provinces (Oblast): Dobrich

Government
  - Mayor: Zhivko Georgiev

Population (December 2009)
  - Total: 6,667
- Time zone: UTC+2 (EET)
  - Summer (DST): UTC+3 (EEST)
- Postal Code: 9450
- Area code: 05751

Tervel (Bulgarian: Тервел, pronounced [ˈtɛrvɛɫ]) is a town in northeastern Bulgaria, part of Dobrich Province. It is the administrative centre of Tervel Municipality, which lies in the westernmost part of the province. As of December 2009, the town had a population of 6,667.

== History ==
The old Ottoman Turkish name of the town was Kurtbunar ("well of the wolves"): the village was first mentioned in Ottoman tax registers of 1673, although the area has been inhabited continuously since antiquity by the Getae tribe of Thracians, then the Slavs and the Bulgars, and constituted a part of the Bulgarian Empire during most of the Middle Ages. In 1878, Kurtbunar became part of the newly liberated Principality of Bulgaria and it was promoted to a district centre of Silistra County on 26 July 1882. The village was part of Romania along with all of Southern Dobruja between 1913 and 1940, and the name was rendered as Curtbunar. It was also a district centre of Durostor County under Romanian rule. The modern Bulgarian name honours Tervel of Bulgaria, a successful eighth-century Bulgarian ruler. The former village was proclaimed a town in January 1960.

Tervel has a museum opened in 1986. It features an ethnographic collection, an art gallery and an archaeological exposition, including a 3,500-year-old human skeleton.
