= Karpachevo =

Karpachevo Кърпачево
- Village
- Location within Bulgaria
- Coordinates: 43.2167°N 25.0167°E
- Country: Bulgaria
- Province: Lovech Province
- Municipality: Letnitsa
- Time zone: UTC+2 (EET)
  - Summer (DST): UTC+3 (EEST)

Karpachevo is a village in Letnitsa Municipality, Lovech Province, northern Bulgaria.
