= Savina Monastery (Serbia) =

Serbian Orthodox monastery in Raška, Serbia

Coordinates: 43.520485°N 20.48597°E

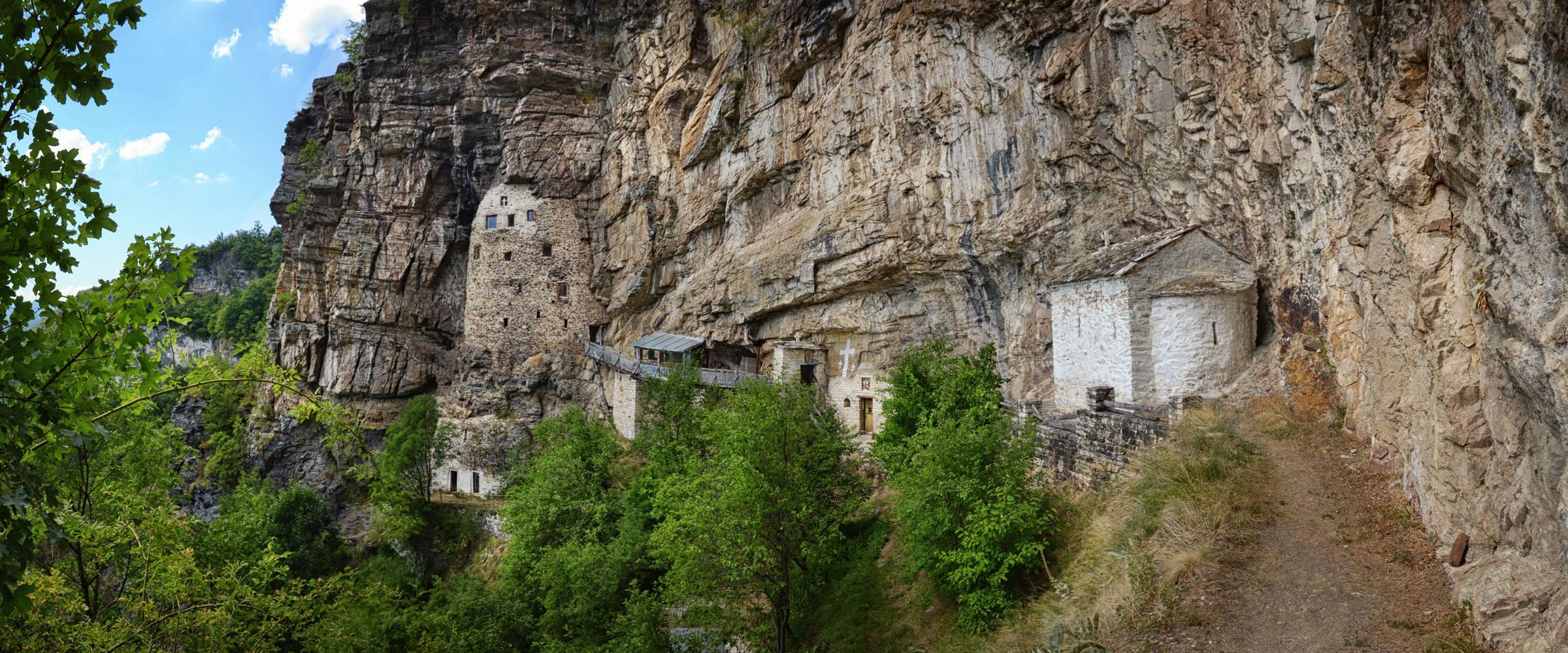
Gornja Savina Isposnica

The cave monastery of Savina or Gornja Savina Isposnica (Serbian: Горња Савина испосница) is located in 15 km from the monastery of Studenica.

It is located in the Raška District.

== See also ==
- List of Serbian monasteries
- Stanjevići Monastery
- Morača Monastery
- Piva Monastery
- Cetinje Monastery
- Podmaine Monastery
- Reževići Monastery
- Dajbabe Monastery
- Burčele Monastery
- Ostrog Monastery
