= Gorsko Slivovo =

Gorsko Slivovo Горско Сливово
- Village
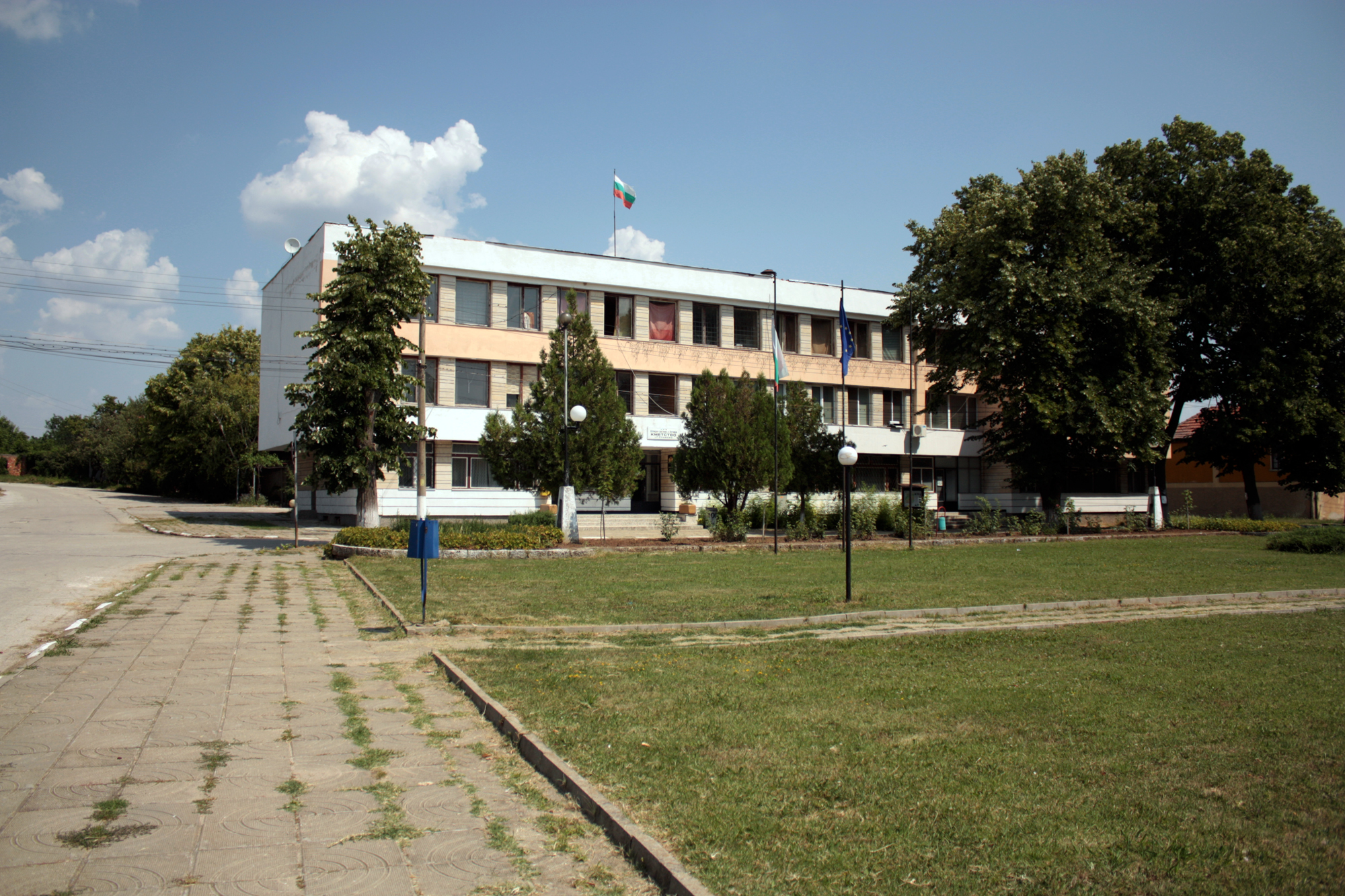
- Village hall in Slivovo

- Location within Bulgaria
- Coordinates: 43.2000°N 25.0667°E
- Country: Bulgaria
- Province: Lovech Province
- Municipality: Letnitsa
- Time zone: UTC+2 (EET)
  - Summer (DST): UTC+3 (EEST)

Gorsko Slivovo is a village in Letnitsa Municipality, Lovech Province, northern Bulgaria.
