= Bezmer, Dobrich Province =

- Village
- Location within Bulgaria
- Coordinates: 43°46′N 27°25′E
- Country: Bulgaria
- Province: Dobrich Province
- Municipality: Tervel
- Time zone: UTC+2 (EET)
  - Summer (DST): UTC+3 (EEST)

Bezmer, Dobrich Province is a village in Tervel Municipality, Dobrich Province, northeastern Bulgaria.
