= Kovilje Monastery =

Serbian Orthodox monastery in Kovilje, Serbia

Coordinates: 43.4343°N 20.1890°E

Kovilje monastery
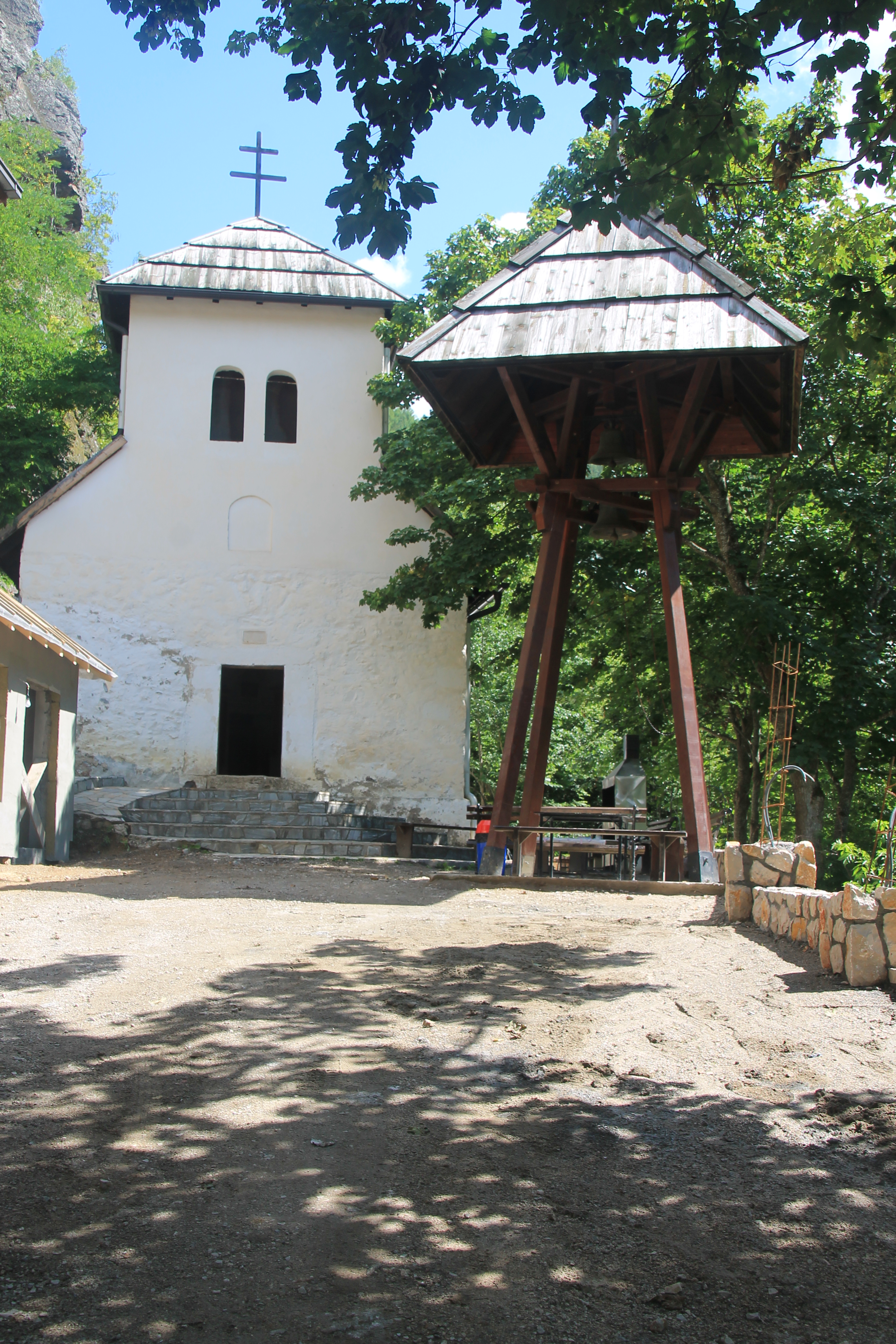
- The Monastery of Kovilje

- Location of Kovilje Monastery within Serbia

Monastery information
- Full name: Манастир Ковиљe
- Order: Serbian Orthodox
- Established: 12th century Renovated 1644
- Dedication: Archangel Gabriel
- Diocese: Žiča Diocese
- Controlled churches: Cave-church of Archangel Gabriel; Church of St. Nicholas

People
- Founder: Saint Sava
- Important associated figures: Archbishop Gavrilo Rašković

Site
- Location: Kovilje, Ivanjica, Serbia

The Kovilje Monastery (Serbian: Манастир Ковиљe, romanized: Manastir Kovilje) dedicated to the archangel Gabriel, is a monastery of the Serbian Orthodox Church, located in the village of Kovilje, in the municipality of Ivanjica, in south-west Serbia belonging to the Žiča Diocese. It is sited between Golija and Javor mountains, in the Nošnica river valley. The monastery has two churches, one built partly in a cave and dedicated to the archangel Gabriel, the other, added later, dedicated to St. Nicholas.

The monastery was founded in the 12th century. The first written reference to it is in 1606, in the "Kruševačkom Pomeniku". It was rebuilt in 1644 by Archbishop Gavrilo (Rašković). Records from 1733 mention it as an educational establishment.

The hegumen of the monastery is the young Serbian Orthodox Hieromonk Amvrosije. He lives there by himself with his tamed animals of two wolves, a fox, an eagle, a snake, raven, rabbit and an owl. The Serb-American community of Libertyville have donated a motorcycle and 4-wheel-drive to the monastery. The life of the monastery has been documented in the Serbian documentary "Monah i vuk".

== Architecture ==
The monastery consists of two temples: the first is dedicated to the archangel Gabriel and another, that was later built, is dedicated to Saint Nicholas. The Church of the Holy Archangel partially rests on the rock, so it can be classified in a group of ascetic cave churches. It is a single building with altar niche. It is believed to have been built in the late 12th or the early 13th century, judging by the remains of frescoes and traditions.

Another temple has a rectangular base and a dome. From frescoes dating from the 13th century, which have survived only in fragments, characters of saints are still well preserved.

== Restoration ==
During the year 1644, Metropolitan of Raska, Gavrilo(Rašković), visited the monastery and found it extremely neglected, in serious condition. Then he restored it and stayed in it for a while, and in 1651 he endowed the monastery with a shackled and decorated Holy Gospel for the liturgical needs of the restored Church of St. Nicholas, and freed the monastery land, which was returned to the monastery.

From the records of 1733, a spiritualist Filip lived in the monastery, who taught those who wanted to become priests. From all this, the monastery was highly ranked as an important place in both spiritual, as well as in national and political life of the people of this region. One of the oldest schools in Serbia was open here in 1867. There was also a school for future priests. Since 1813, the monastery performed an active function of a regular parochial school.

The monastery was restored in 2005, and the monastery refectory was built during 2007–2009.

== Gallery ==
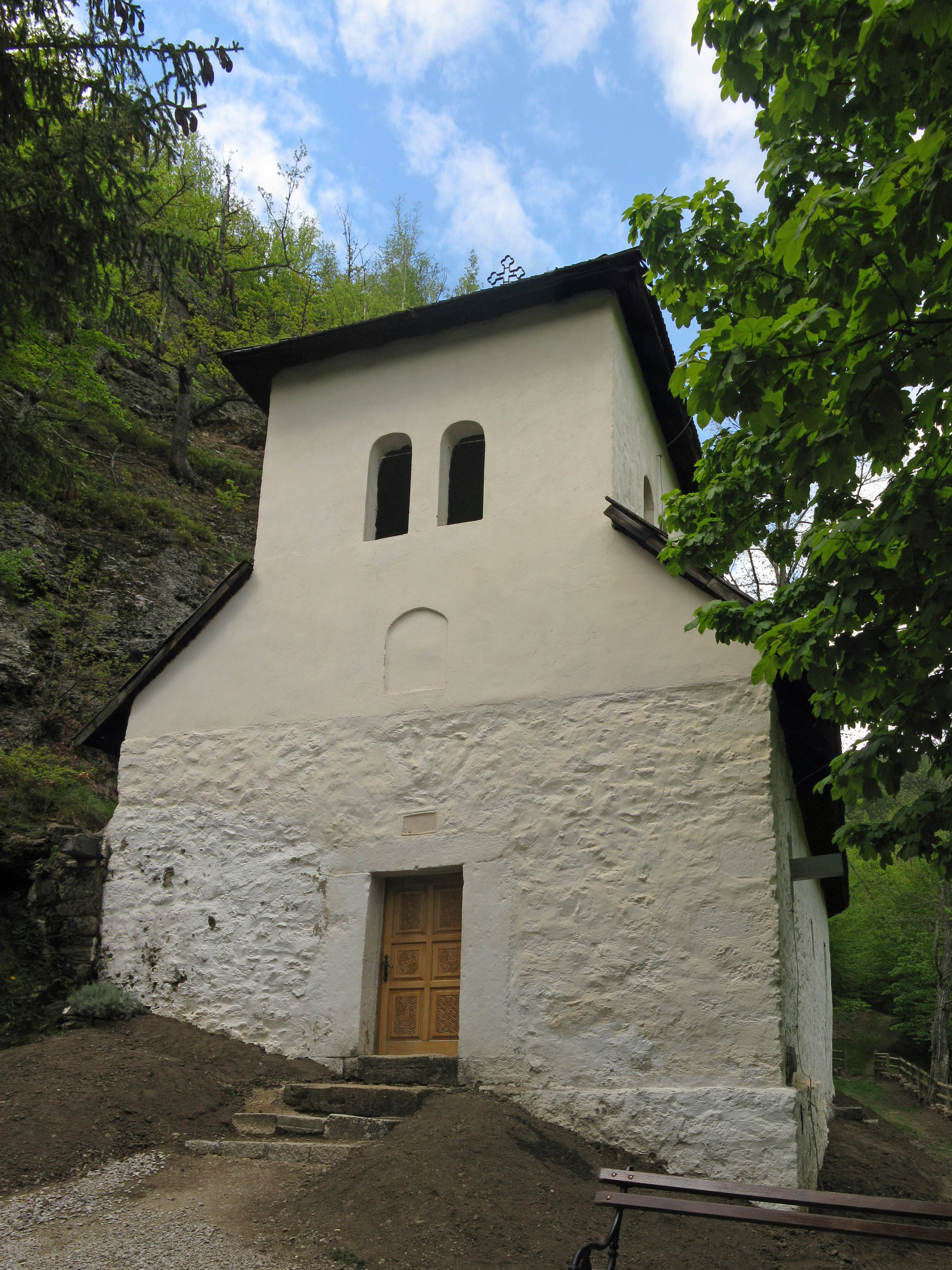
Kovilje Monastery

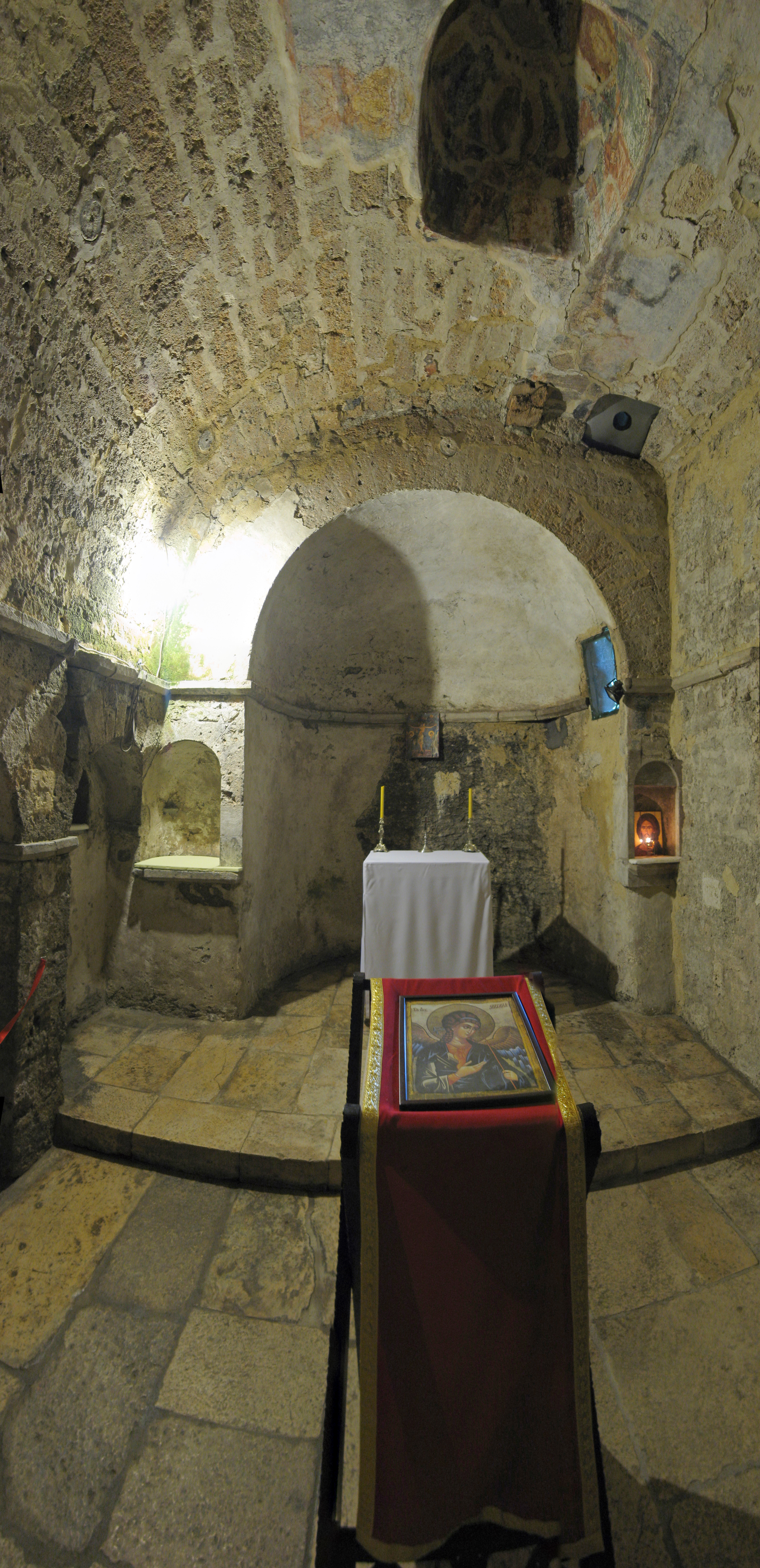
The interior of the Church of Holy Archangel Gabriel

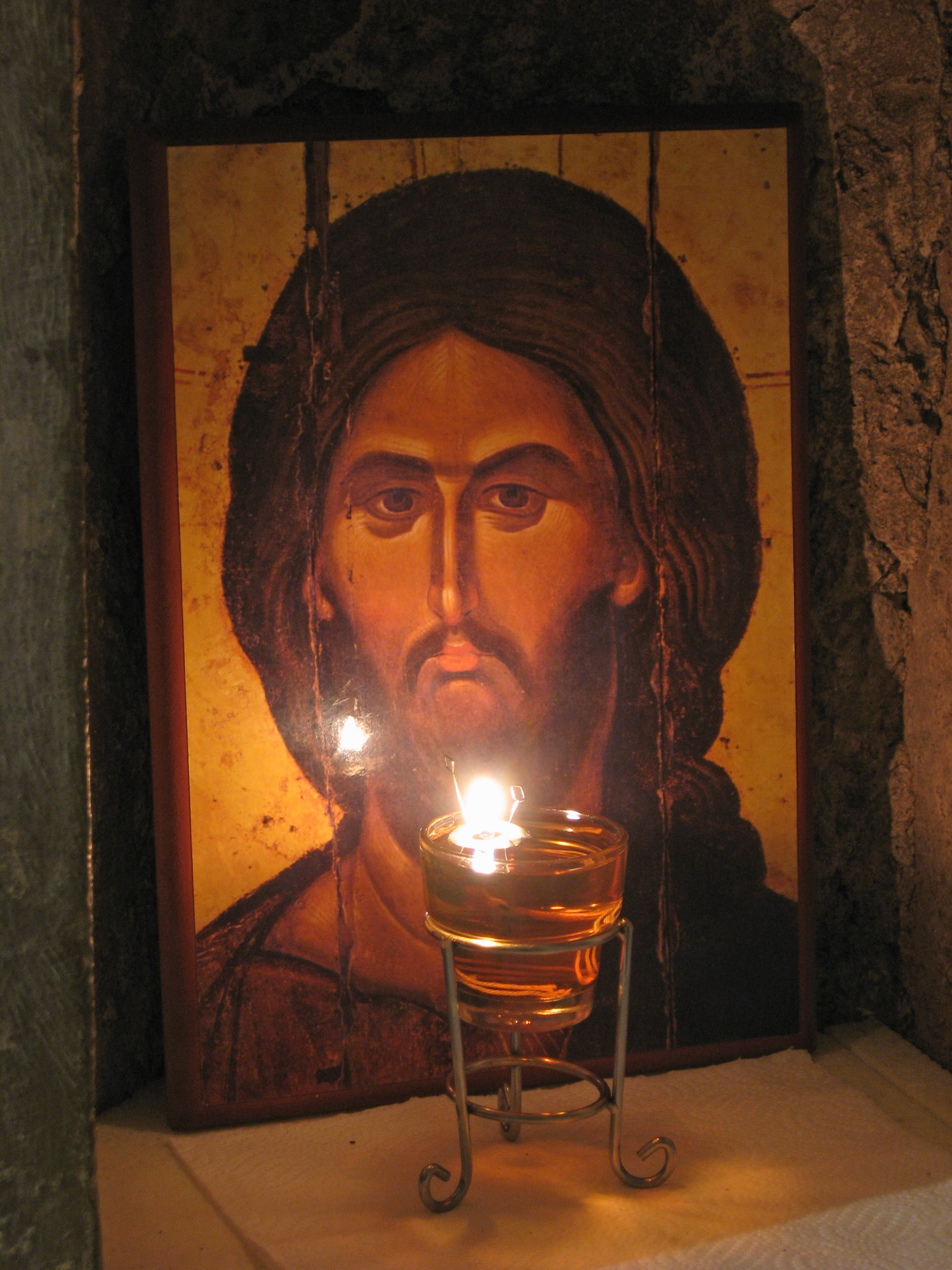
The icon of Christ in the Church of Holy Archangel Gabriel

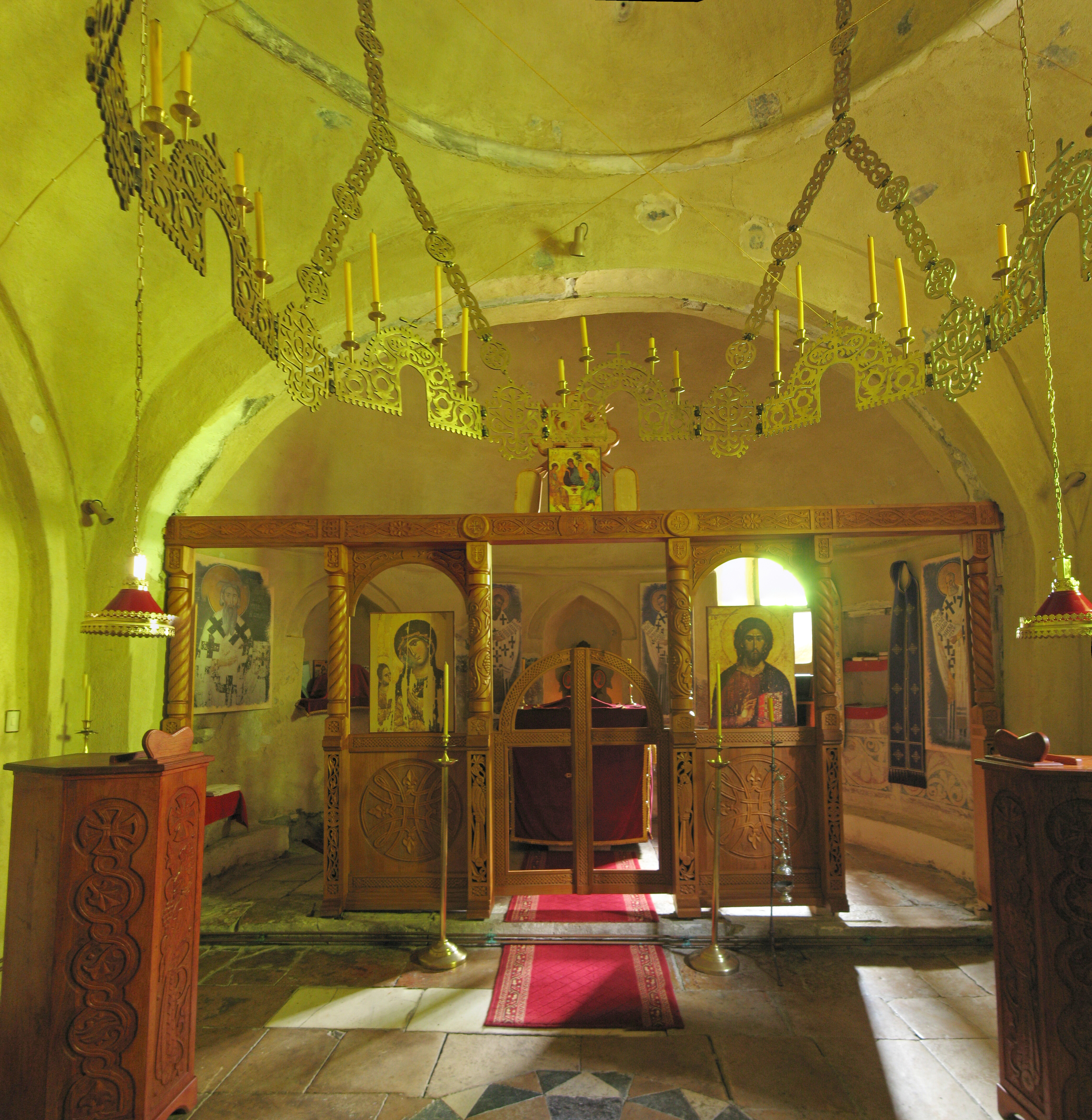
The interior of the Church of St. Nicholas
