= Letnitsa Municipality =

Letnitsa Municipality Община Летница
- Municipality
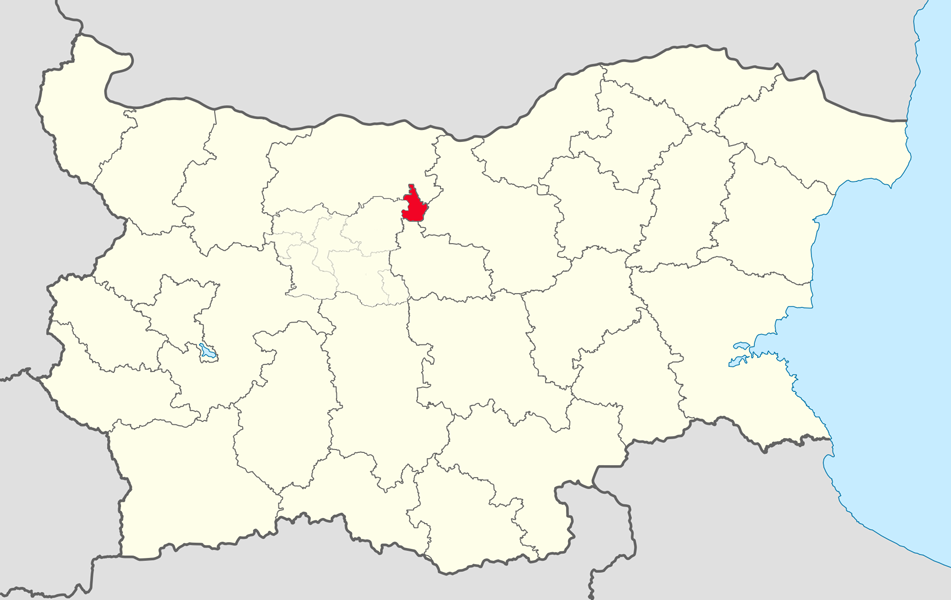
- Letnitsa Municipality within Bulgaria and Lovech Province.
- Coordinates: 43°16′N 25°3′E
- Country: Bulgaria
- Province (Oblast): Lovech
- Admin. centre (Obshtinski tsentar): Letnitsa

Area
  - Total: 178 km^{2} (69 sq mi)

Population (December 2009)
  - Total: 5,101
  - Density: 28.7/km^{2} (74.2/sq mi)
- Time zone: UTC+2 (EET)
  - Summer (DST): UTC+3 (EEST)

Letnitsa Municipality (Bulgarian: Община Летница) is a small municipality (obshtina) in Lovech Province, Central-North Bulgaria, located on the border between the area of the Fore-Balkan and the Danubian Plain. It is named after its administrative centre - the town of Letnitsa.

The municipality embraces a territory of 178 km^{2} (69 sq mi) with a population of 5,101 inhabitants, as of December 2009.

== Settlements ==
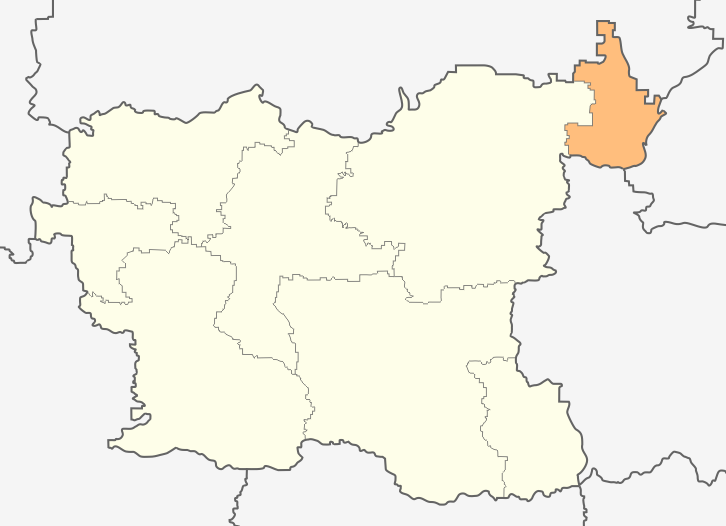
Letnitsa Municipality within Lovech Province

Letnitsa Municipality includes the following 4 places (towns are shown in bold):

Town/Village	Cyrillic	Population (December 2009)
**Letnitsa**	**Летница**	3,739
Gorsko Slivovo	Горско Сливово	715
Krushuna	Крушуна	505
Karpachevo	Кърпачево	142
Total		5,101

== Demography ==
The following table shows the change of the population during the last four decades.

Letnitsa Municipality
**Year**	1975	1985	1992	**2001**	2005	2007	2009	**2011**
**Population**	8,043	7,201	6,752	5,607	5,392	5,258	5,101	...
Sources: Census 2001, Census 2011, „pop-stat.mashke.org“,

=== Religion ===
According to the latest Bulgarian census of 2011, the religious composition, among those who answered the optional question on religious identification, was the following:

Religious composition of Letnitsa Municipality
Orthodox Christianity	71.2%
Catholicism	1.0%
Protestantism	0.0%
Islam	10.0%
No religion	9.1%
Prefer not to answer, others and indefinable	8.7%

== See also ==
- Provinces of Bulgaria
- Municipalities of Bulgaria
- List of cities and towns in Bulgaria
