= Krushuna =

Krushuna Крушуна
- Village
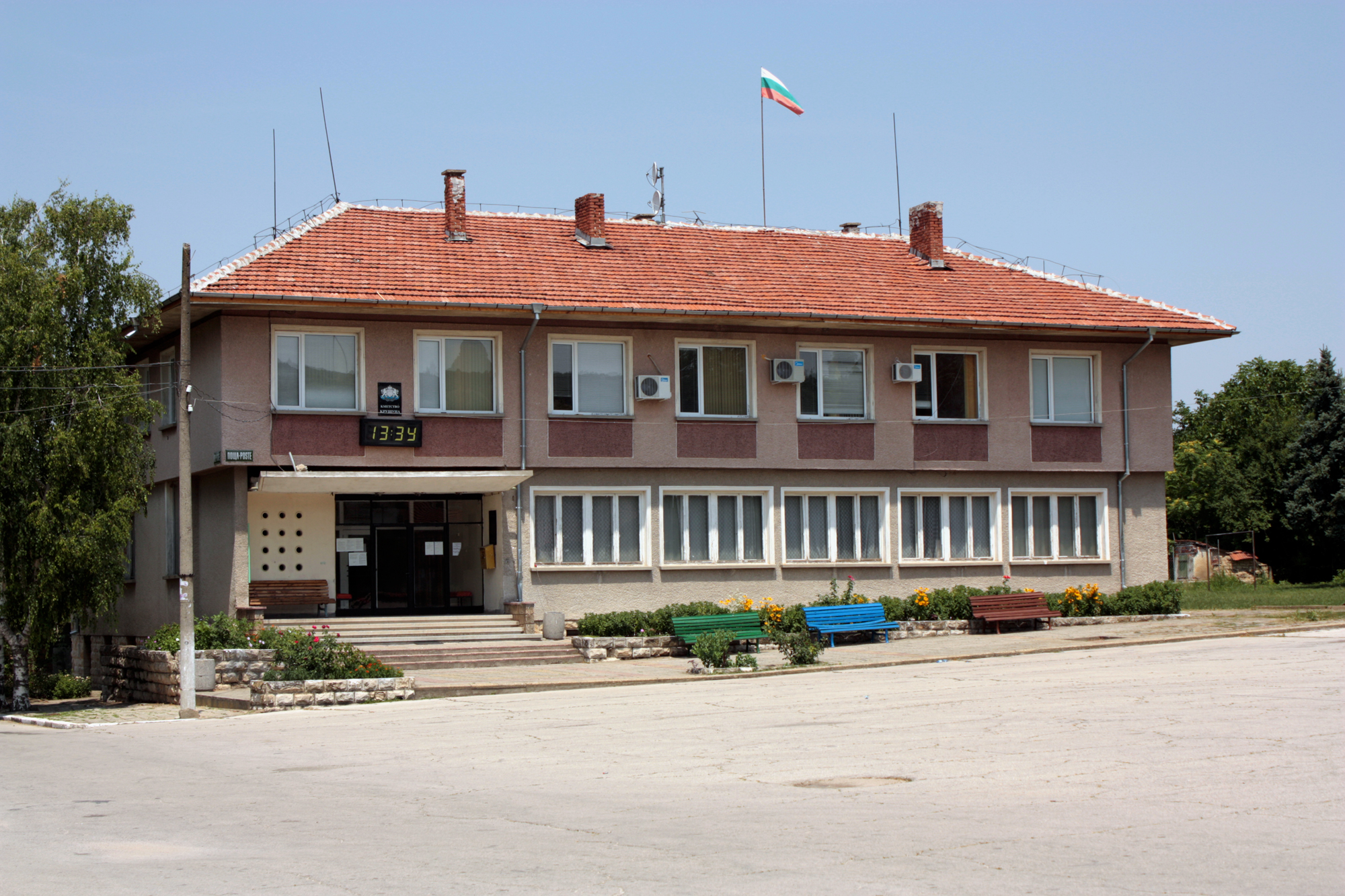
- Municipal hall in Krushuna

- Location within Bulgaria
- Coordinates: 43.2500°N 25.0333°E
- Country: Bulgaria
- Province: Lovech Province
- Municipality: Letnitsa
- Time zone: UTC+2 (EET)
  - Summer (DST): UTC+3 (EEST)

Krushuna (Bulgarian: Крушуна [kroˈʃunɐ]) is a village in Letnitsa Municipality, Lovech Province, northern Bulgaria.

The remains of ancient Roman forts "Kaleto" and "Daran-baran" are located about 500 m south of Krushuna. They probably date from the 2nd century BC and were strategic defenses against tribes from the north; Goths, Carpi, Sarmatians, Vandals and Slavs.
