= Lake Durankulak =

Lake in Bulgaria

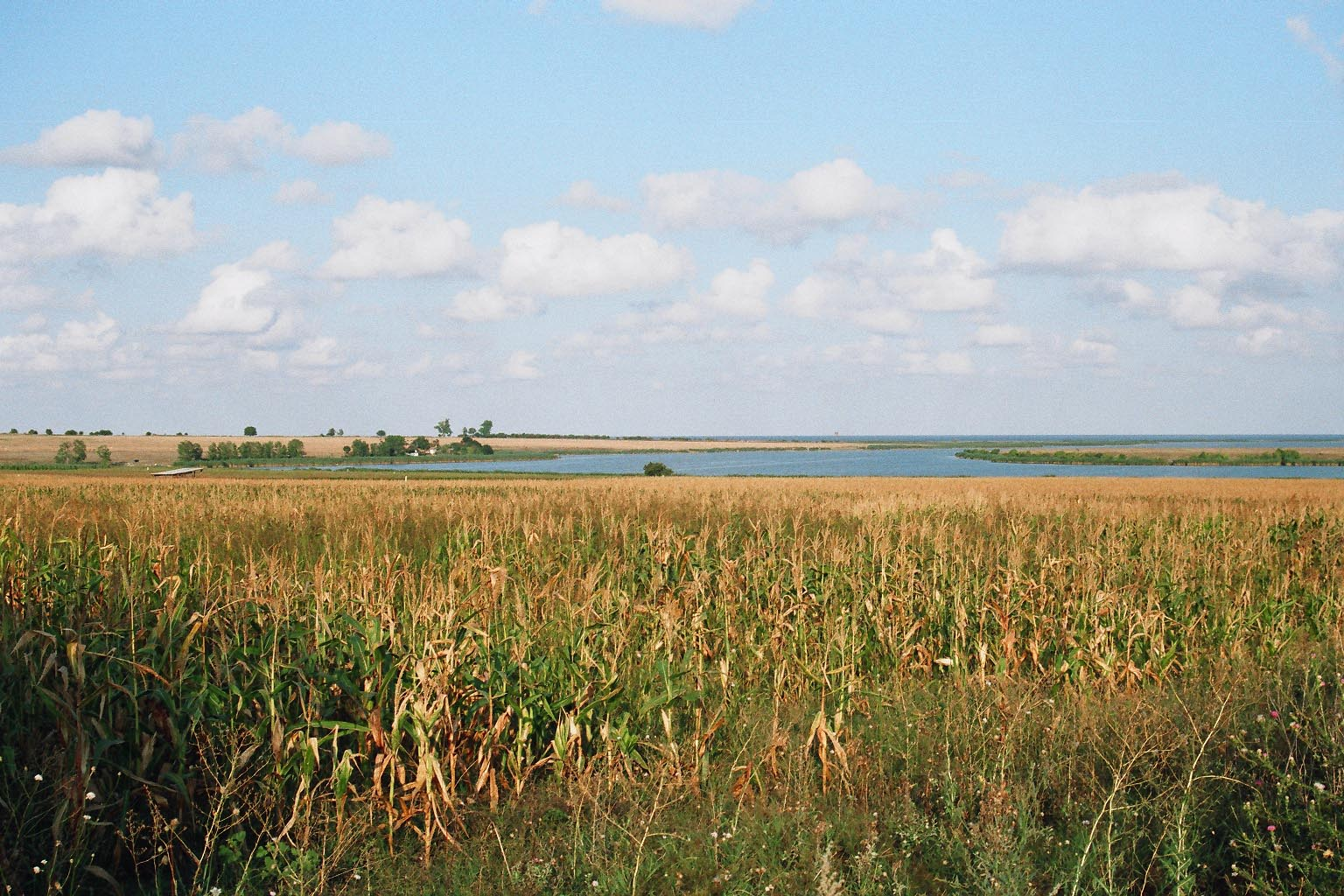
- View of Lake Durankulak

- Location within Bulgaria
- Coordinates: 43.672°N 28.547°E
- Basin countries: Bulgaria
- Surface area: 4 km^{2} (1.5 sq mi)
- Islands: 2 (Big Island, Small Island)

Ramsar Wetland
- Official name: Durankulak Lake
- Designated: 28 November 1984
- Reference no.: 293

Lake Durankulak (Bulgarian: Дуранкулашко езеро) is a brackish lagoon (liman) in northeastern Bulgaria, separated from the Black Sea by sand dunes and a beach strip. It is situated along the Bulgarian Black Sea Coast near the village of Durankulak in Dobrich Province, some six kilometers south of the Bulgaria–Romania border. It is a protected area with many rare plant and animal species and also contains the archaeological site of Durankulak, situated on the larger of the lake's two islands.

== Geography ==
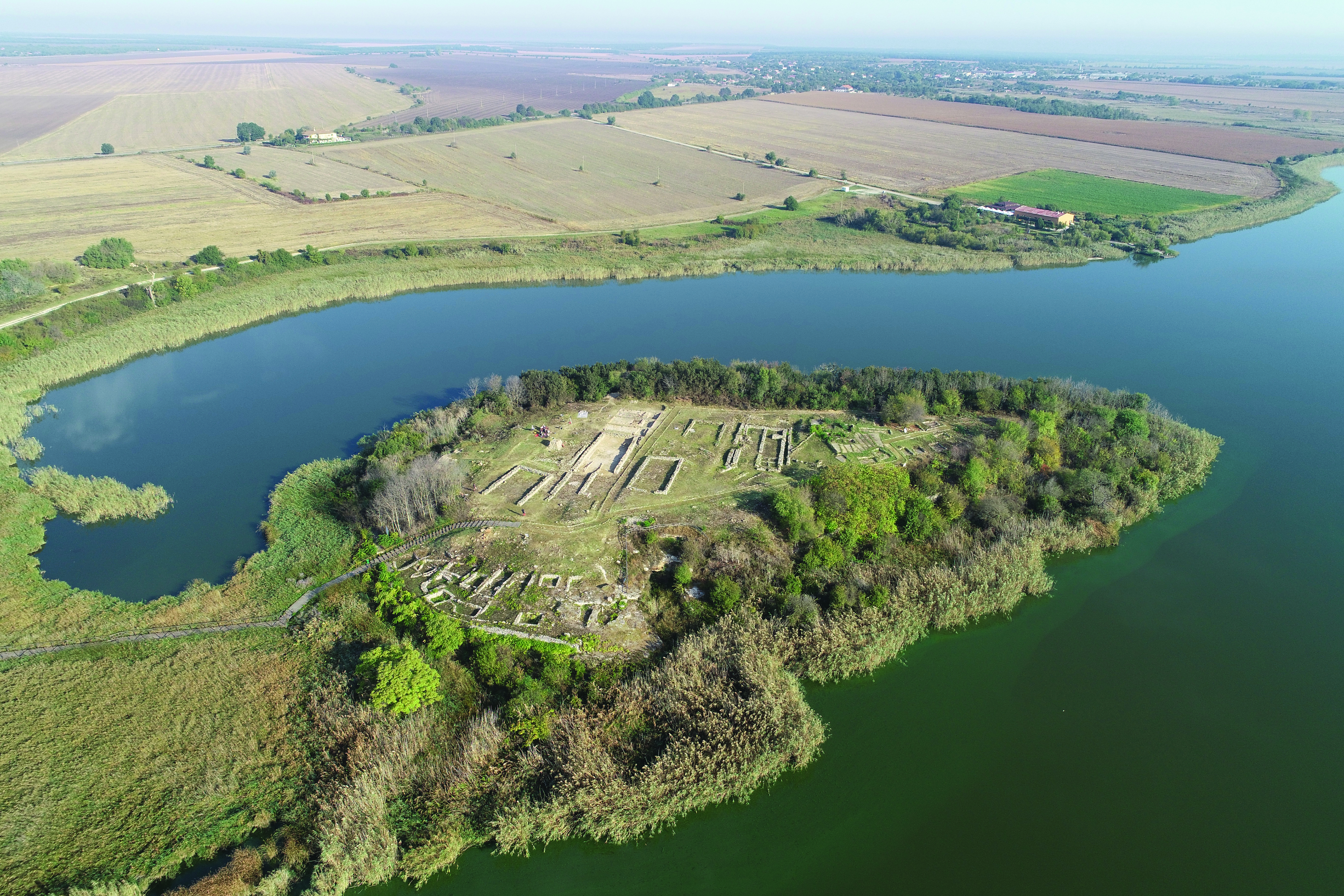
A view of the Big Island

The lake lies in the region of Dobruja on the western Black Sea shores between the villages of Durankulak to the northwest, Krapets to the south and Vaklino to the southwest, about 15 km north of the town of Shabla and Lake Shabla. It was formed about 10,000 years ago as a result of the sinking of land masses due to epeirogenic movements of the Earth's crust and the intrusion of seawater into the nearby mouths of rivers flowing into the Black Sea.

Lake Durankulak has the shape of the letter “Y” with its upper end facing west. It has two main arms, the smaller northwestern begins at the bridge of the first class I-9 road at Durankulak and the southwestern one is fed by the river Shablenska reka. It has an area of around 4 km^{2} and features two islands in its western part, the Big Island (0.02 km^{2}) and the Small Island (0.0053 km^{2}). Lake Durankulak is linked via an artificial channel to the marsh of Orlovo Blato to the north.

Its maximum depth is 4 m, the water volume is 4.9 million m^{3} and the salinity is up to 4‰. Due to the irregular river flow and the low rainfall, the lake is mainly fed by karst springs — about 80% of the total water volume. The annual water balance includes a total inflow of 11.714 million m^{3} of water, of which 2.001 million m^{3} comes from precipitation, 0.473 million m^{3} from surface water and 9.240 million m^{3} from underground water, and a total outflow of 11.734 million m^{3}, of which 2.270 million m^{3} from evaporation, 2.322 million m^{3} from transpiration and 7.142 million m^{3} flow into the Black Sea.

== Protection ==
As the habitat of over 260 rare and endangered species, the lake is one of the most important and well-preserved coastal wetlands in Bulgaria. It is classified as a protected area since 1980, spanning a territory of 446 ha or 4.46 km^{2}. In addition, Lake Durankulak is protected under the European Union Birds Directive and Habitats Directive. The lake is part of the Ramsar Wetlands of International Importance under the Ramsar Convention since 1984. The land of the protected area is state-owned and managed by the Ministry of Environment and Water of Bulgaria.

== Nature ==
=== Vegetation and flora ===
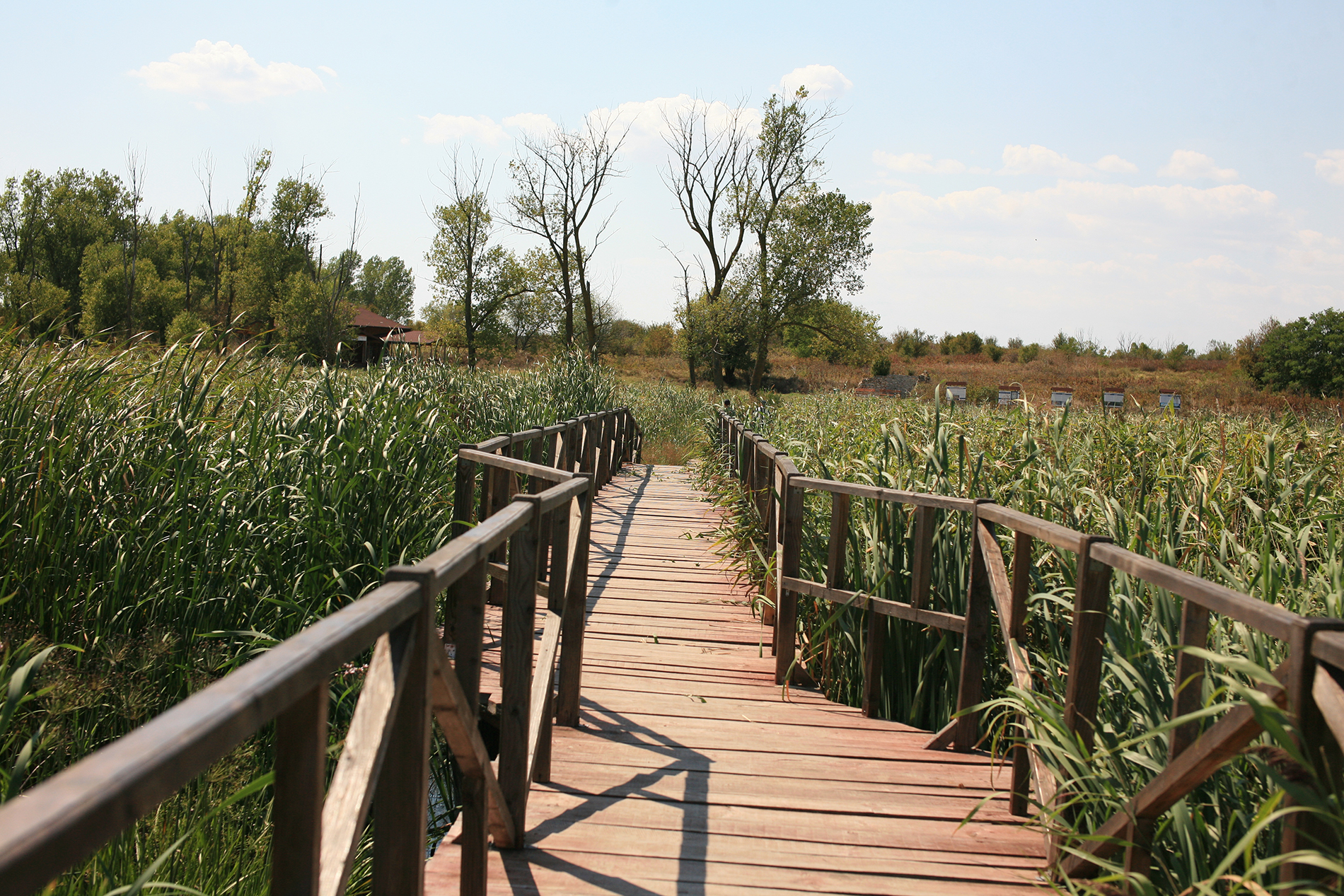
Pathway through the reeds

Of the 446 ha of the Lake Durankulak Protected Area, 250 ha are open water, which includes the neighbouring marsh of Orlovo Blato, 193 ha are covered with aquatic and semi-aquatic vegetation and 2 ha belong to the archaeological site on the Big Island. Over 80% of the vegetation-covered area is occupied by common reed (Phragmites australis) communities, followed by narrowleaf cattail (Typha angustifolia), broadleaf cattail (Typha latifolia), triangular club-rush (Schoenoplectus triqueter) and common club-rush (Schoenoplectus lacustris).

The vascular plants are represented by 69 species. Locally common aquatic plants found in Lake Durankulak include broad-leaved pondweed (Potamogeton natans), crisp-leaved pondweed (Potamogeton crispus), sago pondweed (Stuckenia pectinata), rigid hornwort (Ceratophyllum demersum), greater bladderwort (Utricularia vulgaris), common duckweed (Lemna minor), star duckweed (Lemna trisulca) and common water-crowfoot (Ranunculus aquatilis). The only naturally growing tree is the white willow (Salix alba). Rare or endangered species found near the lake shores and the sandbar that separates it from the sea include Astrodaucus littoralis, Convolvulus persicus, Spirobassia hirsuta, Astragalus albicaulis, Festuca vaginata, Aeluropus littoralis, as well as the only population of Triglochin maritima in Bulgaria. There are 255 species of algae.

=== Fauna ===
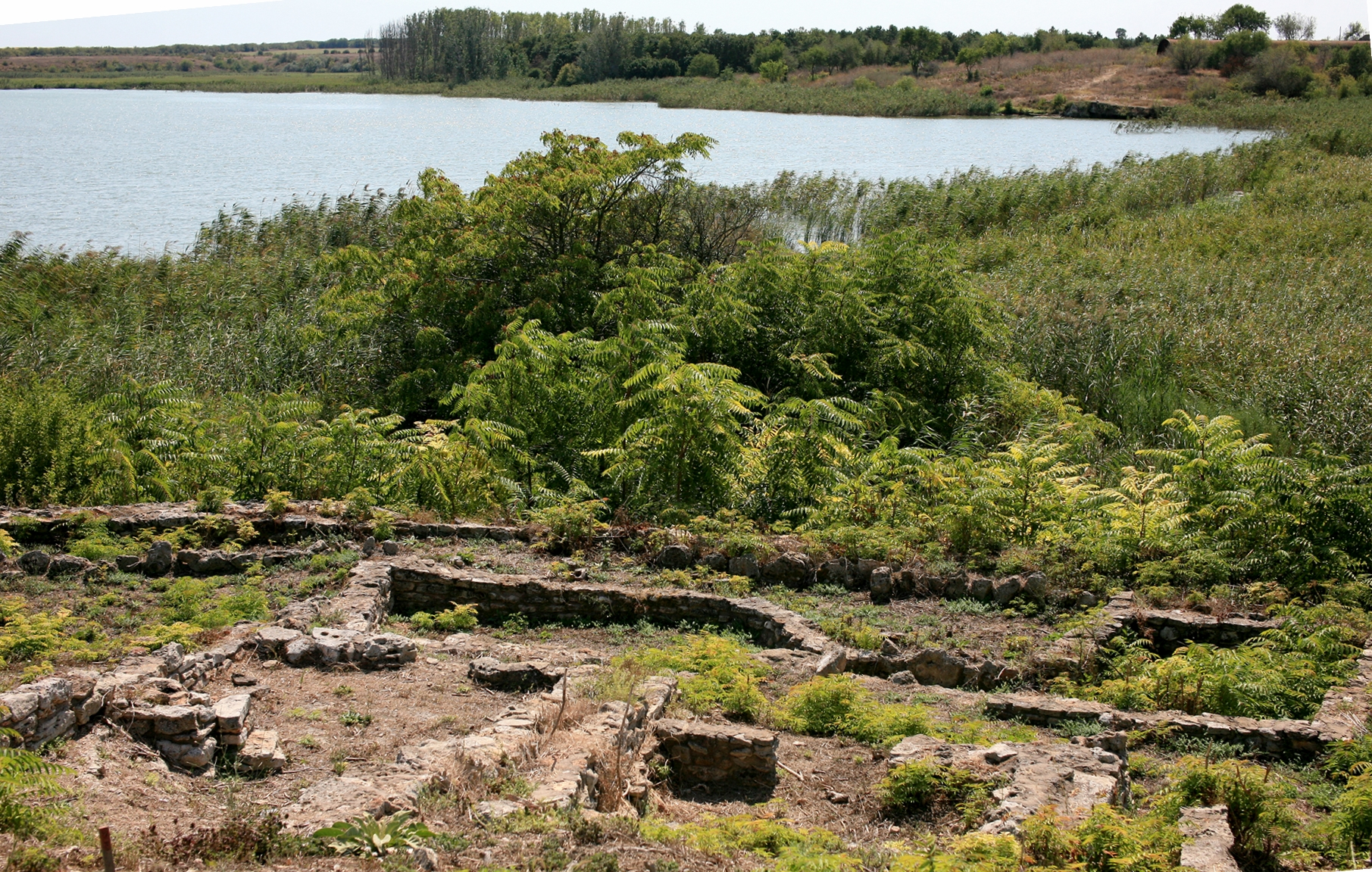
A view of the lake from the archaeological site

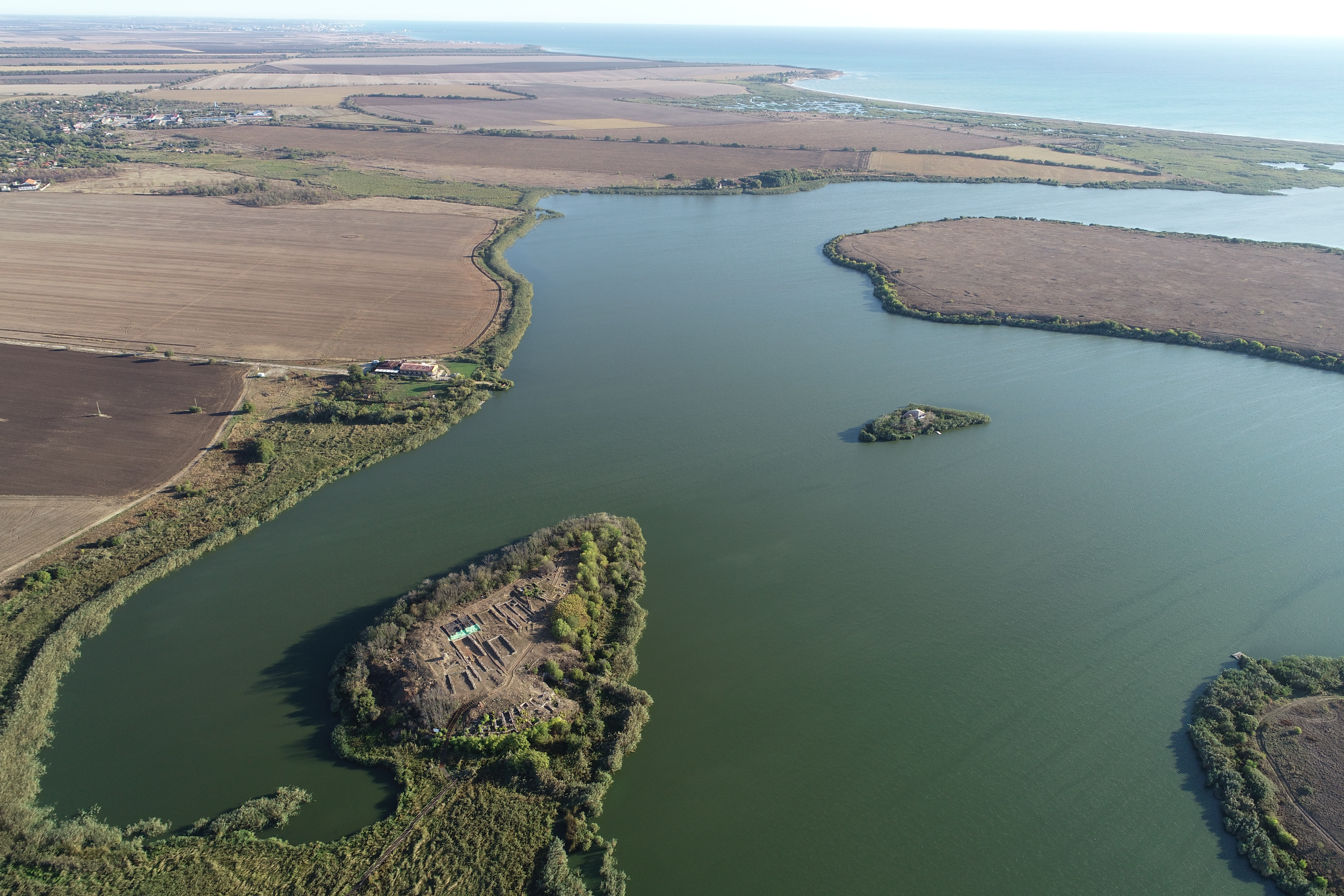
Aerial view of Lake Durankulak

The lake and its steppe surroundings are a haven for wetland and steppe animals, including endangered mammals, such as marbled polecat, steppe polecat, Eurasian otter, European ground squirrel and Romanian hamster. There are also stable populations of European water vole and Eurasian harvest mouse.

There is a diverse avifauna that includes a total of 256 species, including at least 92 nesting ones. Among nesting birds in the area are populations of international importance of little bittern, Kentish plover and lesser grey shrike, as well as of national importance of ferruginous duck, mute swan, Eurasian stone-curlew, paddyfield warbler and western marsh harrier. Along its shores and the surrounding area nests the European bee-eater. There are large populations of the pygmy cormorant and great white pelican. Other rare nesting species included in the Red Book of Bulgaria are red-footed falcon, black-winged stilt, pied avocet, little tern, Eurasian bittern, purple heron, red-necked grebe, garganey, spotted crake, little crake, bearded reedling, river warbler, Eurasian penduline tit, calandra lark, black-winged pratincole, etc.

Situated on the Via Pontica route for migratory birds, the second largest one in Europe, Lake Durankulak is an important wintering site for the greater white-fronted goose, red-breasted goose and mallard. Other wintering birds include tundra swan, whooper swan, lesser white-fronted goose, white-headed duck, common crane, etc.

The herpetofauna is also varied and includes seven amphibian and five reptile species. The most common frog species are European green toad, marsh frog, European fire-bellied toad and eastern spadefoot.

The lake hosts freshwater fish fauna of 23 species, including the only proven population of wild Eurasian carp in the country, as well as rare species, such as Pontic shad, Black Sea shad, Ukrainian stickleback, Black Sea sprat, crucian carp, Danube bleak, etc. It is likely that the lake is the last inland body of water in Bulgaria where the flatsnout goby is still found. The most widespread fish are common roach, common rudd, European perch, zander, Caucasian dwarf goby, round goby, tubenose goby and black-striped pipefish. The Wels catfish and the European eel are also indigenous but generally uncommon.

== Archaeology ==
The lake is also an archaeologically important area. Pithouses of the oldest known inhabitants of Dobruja, dating to 5100–4700 BC, have been unearthed near the west shore, as well as 3500–3400 BC mound burials and a Sarmatian necropolis from Late Antiquity. The Big Island of Lake Durankulak is particularly important, as it is the site of an Eneolithic settlement of 4600–4200 BC, a cultural monument of national importance. The island also features a 1300–1200 BC fortified settlement, a Hellenistic rock-hewn cave sanctuary of Cybele (3rd century BC) and a Bulgar settlement from the 9th–10th century AD during the First Bulgarian Empire. Because of its age and importance, the archaeological complex has been dubbed the "Bulgarian Troy".
