= Shablenska reka =

Location
- Country: Bulgaria

Physical characteristics
- Source
  - location: NE of the village of Mogilishte
  - coordinates: 43°29′30.12″N 28°20′49.92″E
  - elevation: 125 m (410 ft)
- Mouth
  - location: Lake Durankulak → Black Sea
  - coordinates: 43°39′42.12″N 28°32′9.96″E
  - elevation: 0 m (0 ft)
- Length: 31 km (19 mi)
- Basin size: 95 km^{2} (37 sq mi)

The Shablenska reka (Bulgarian: Шабленска река) is a 31 km long river in northeastern Bulgaria.

The river takes its source in the steppe region of Dobrudzha at an altitude of 125 m, northeast of the village of Mogilishte. Throughout its whole course the Shablenska reka flows in direction northeast in a shallow valley under intense cultivation. It flows into the southwestern corner of the coastal Lake Durankulak, which drains into the Black Sea.

Its drainage basin covers a territory of 95 square kilometres (37 sq mi). The river has irregular flow and dries up completely during the dry months in summer and autumn.

The Shablenska reka flows entirely in Dobrich Province. There are seven villages along its course: Mogilishte, Irechek, Vidno and Neykovo in Kavarna Municipality, and Tvarditsa, Bozhanovo and Vaklino in Shabla Municipality.
