= Granichar =

Granichar may refer to the following places in Bulgaria:

- Granichar, Burgas Province
- Granichar, Dobrich Province
