= Smin =

Smin may refer to:

== People ==
- Smin Sam Lek (1340–1388), Burmese viceroy
- Smin Bayan, Burmese commander

== Places ==
- Smin, Bulgaria
- Smin Peak, Antarctica
- Šmin, a historical Coptic name for Akhmim, Egypt

== Other uses ==
- SMIN or Smiths Group

== See also ==
- Smen
