= Shabla Lighthouse =

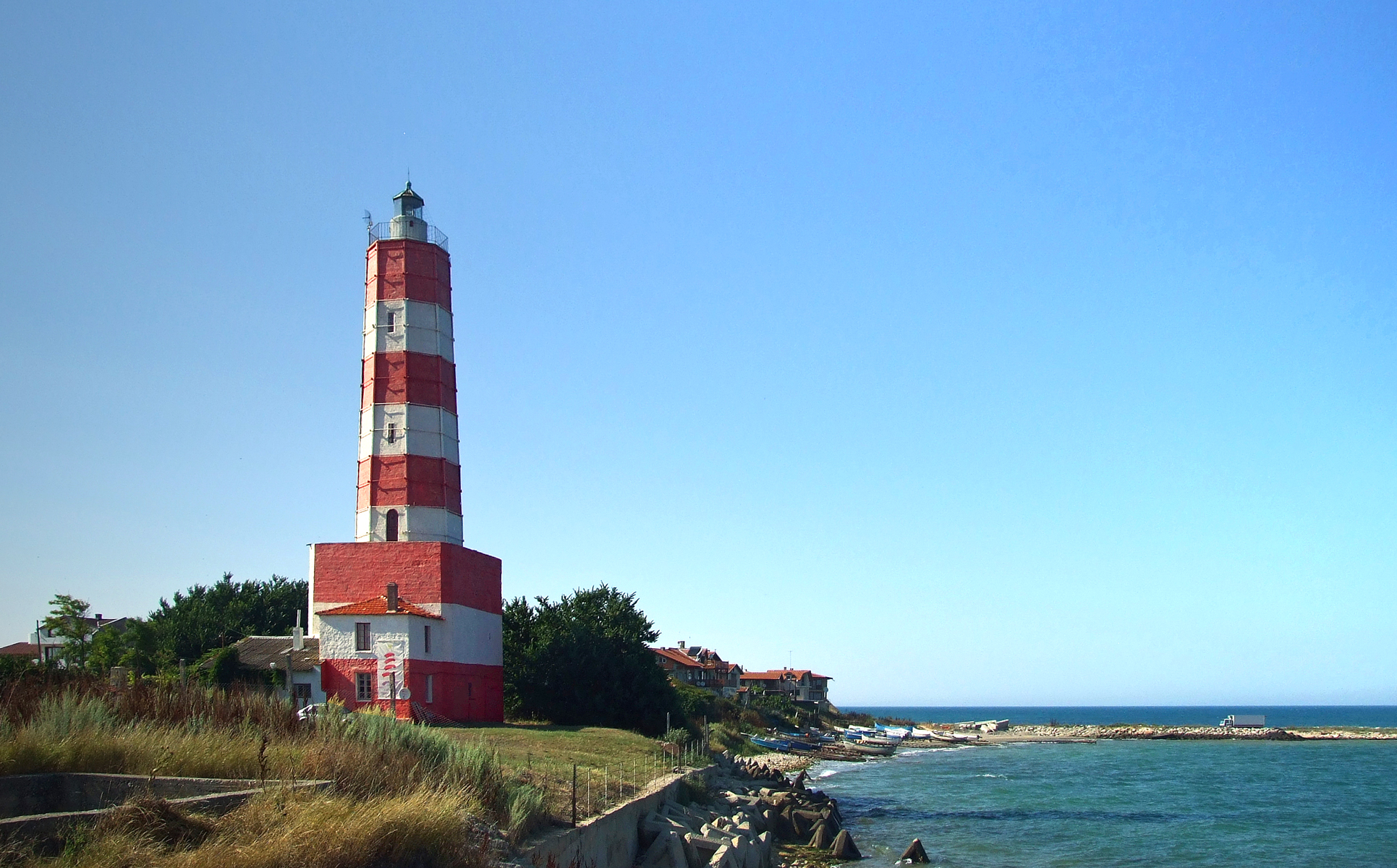
- Shabla Lighthouse
- Location: Shabla; Dobrich Province; Bulgaria
- Coordinates: 43°32′25.1″N 28°36′25.2″E

Tower
- Constructed: 1765/1768
- Construction: limestone tower
- Height: 36 metres (118 ft)
- Shape: octagonal tower with balcony and lantern on a 3-story basement
- Markings: basement and tower painted with white and red horizontal bands

Light
- Focal height: 32 metres (105 ft)
- Range: 14 nautical miles (26 km; 16 mi)
- Characteristic: Fl (3) W 20s.

The Shabla Lighthouse (Bulgarian: Шабленски фар) is a lighthouse located 5 kilometres east of the town of Shabla, Dobrich Province; in Bulgaria. The lighthouse was built in 1765/1768 by the Ottoman Empire and is the oldest lighthouse in Bulgaria. The lighthouse is located at the easternmost point of Bulgaria.

== See also ==
- List of lighthouses in Bulgaria
