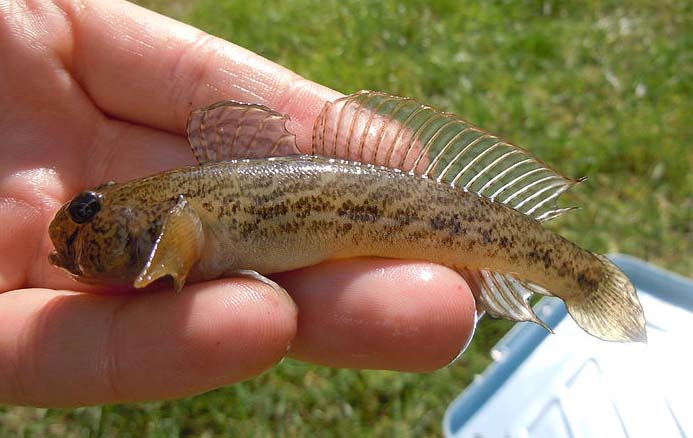
- The Racer Goby from the Bug River, Poland

Conservation status
- Least Concern (IUCN 3.1)

Scientific classification
- Kingdom: Animalia
- Phylum: Chordata
- Class: Actinopterygii
- Division: Teleostei
- Order: Gobiiformes
- Family: Gobiidae
- Genus: Babka; Iljin, 1927
- Species: B. gymnotrachelus

Binomial name
- Babka gymnotrachelus (Kessler, 1857)
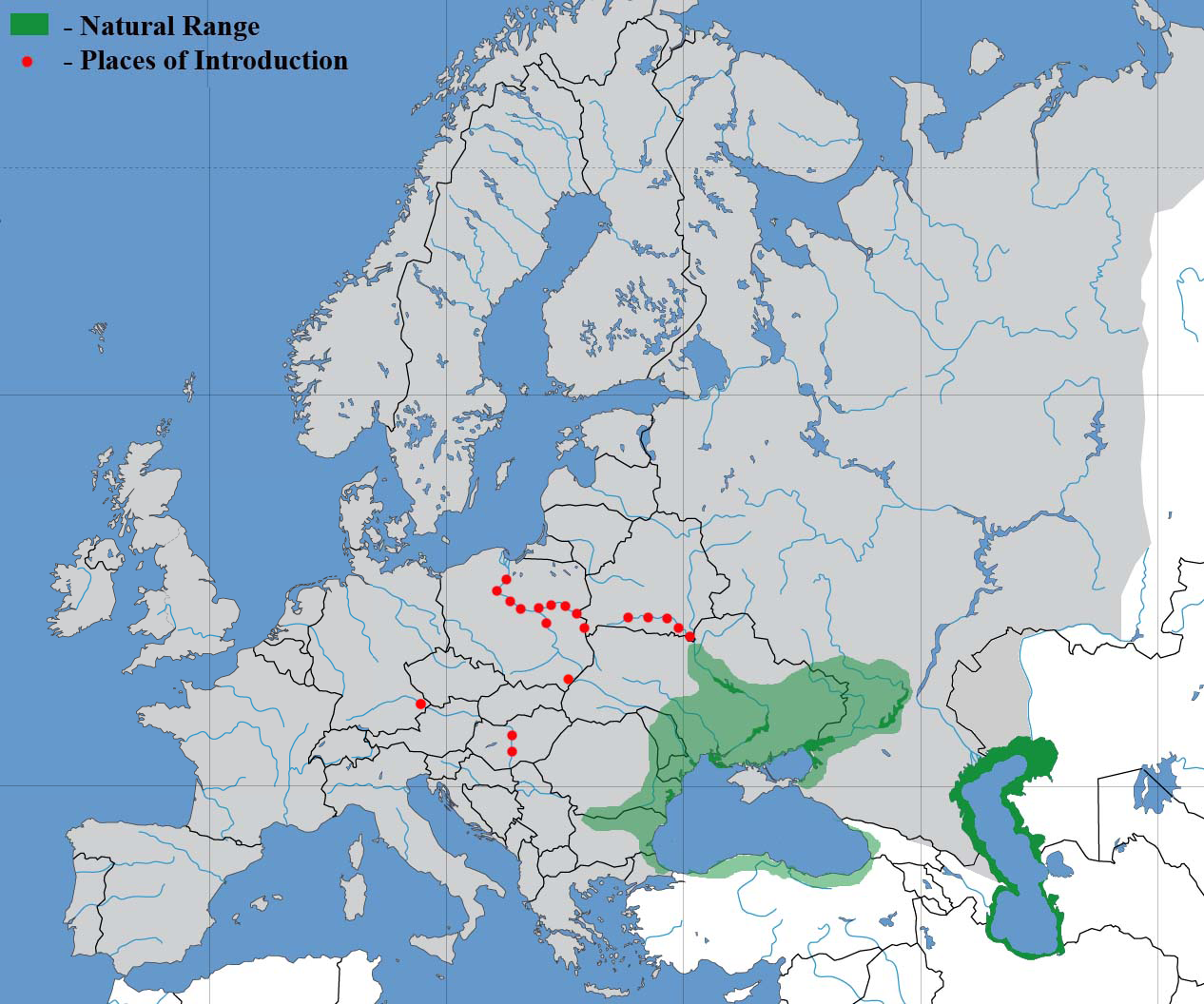
- The range of the racer goby

Synonyms
- Gobius gymnotrachelus Kessler, 1857; Mesogobius gymnotrachelus (Kessler, 1857); Neogobius gymnotrachelus (Kessler, 1857); Gobius macropus De Filippi, 1863; Gobius burmeisteri Kessler, 1877; Mesogobius gymnotrachelus otschakovinus Zubovich, 1925

= Racer goby =

Species of fish

The racer goby (Babka gymnotrachelus) is a species of goby native to fresh, sometimes brackish, waters, of the Black Sea basin. It is a Ponto-Caspian relict species. The species is placed in Babka, which was once considered a subgenus of genus Neogobius, but was then elevated to genus-status based on the molecular analysis.

== Characteristics ==
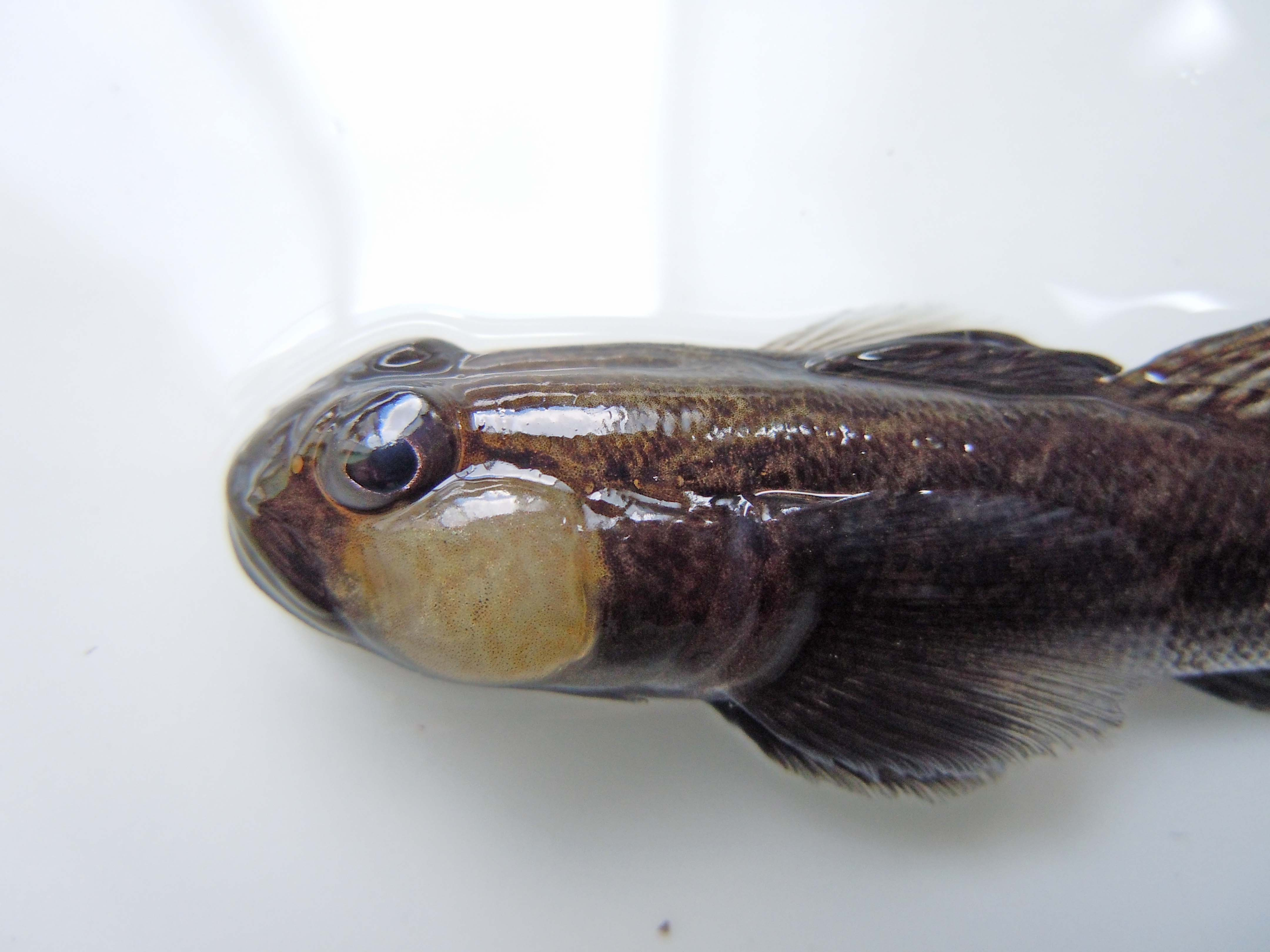
The head of the racer goby from the Dnieper River near Kyiv

It has 7–8 dorsal spines, 14–18 dorsal soft rays, a single anal spine and 12–16 anal soft rays. This species is distinguished from its relatives in Neogobius based on multiple characteristics. B. gymnotrachelus has diagonal bars of irregular position and shape. The first branched ray of second dorsal is about as long as its penultimate ray. It lacks scales on the midline of its nape, anterior to its preoperculum. It has a pelvic-disc fraenum with small rounded lobes and length less than 1/6 of width at base. It has 54–62 + 2–3 scales in midlateral series. The posterior part of first dorsal has no black spot.

== Ecology ==
=== Range ===
This goby inhabits the coasts of Turkey, the rivers of the Caucasus, including Inguri, Rioni and the rivers of Kolkhida, including Lake Paliastomi, Lake Suzha. In the north-western Black Sea it inhabits the Dnieper-Bug Estuary, Dniester Estuary, near the Tendra sandbar and Berezan Island. In the Danube River it is widespread up to Vidin, and lives in tributaries and lakes of Danube Delta, including Brateş, Kahul, Yalpug, Katlabuh, Kitay, Razelm, etc. It inhabits the Dniester River and its tributaries, including Zbruch, Zhvanchik, Smotrych, Răut, Bîc, Dubăsari Reservoir. It is common in the Southern Bug River and in the Dnieper River as far as Kyiv. It lives in the Kamchiya River and Lake Shablensko in Bulgaria. In the Sea of Azov it is in Taganrog Bay and the Don, Aksay, Seversky Donets rivers. Recorded in the lower zone of the Volgograd Reservoir and in the unregulated section of the Volga River near Volgograd. It also inhabits the Caspian Sea, where it is represented by the subspecies Babka gymnotrachelus macrophthalmus, which further research may show to be a separate species.

The racer goby inhabits but is non-indigenous in the rivers of the Baltic basin, including the Bug and Vistula. It was also introduced in the Middle Danube, in Hungary. The westernmost locality of this species range is the German sector of the Danube River, where this fish occurred first in 2011. The information about the introduction of this species to the Lower Rhine River is considered erroneous.

=== Feeding ===
In the Dniester Estuary half of the racer goby's diet consists of fish. The rest is a mix of crustaceans (Corophiidae) (29.6%), molluscs (Dreissena, Adacna, Monodacna) (12,5%) and polychaete worms of the species Hypania invalida. In the Dnieper River near Kyiv the diet consists of molluscs Dreissena sp., amphipods and sewage worms Tubifex tubifex.
