= Zahari Stoyanovo =

Zahari Stoyanovo may refer to the following places in Bulgaria:

- Zahari Stoyanovo, Dobrich Province
- Zahari Stoyanovo, Targovishte Province, Targovishte Province
