= Krapets =

Krapets may refer to:

- Krapets, Dobrich Province
- Krapets, Vratsa Province
- Krapets Glacier, glacier on Pefaur Peninsula, Danco Coast on the west side of Antarctic Peninsula
