= List of lighthouses in Bulgaria =

This is a list of lighthouses in Bulgaria, which are all located on the Black Sea coast.

== Lighthouses ==
Name	Image	Province	Location coordinates	Year built	Notes
Shabla Lighthouse		Dobrich Province	Shabla 43°32′27″N 28°36′21″E	1856	The station was established in 1786 by the Ottoman Empire. Built in 1856, the current tower is Bulgaria's oldest and tallest lighthouse.
Kaliakra Lighthouse		Dobrich Province	Kaliakra 43°21′41″N 28°27′57″E	1901	A 10 metres (33 ft) tower made of stone that rises from the keeper's house.
Cape Galata Lighthouse		Varna Province	43°10′12″N 27°56′42″E	1987	During World War I, the lighthouse built in 1913 was shelled and damaged by the Russian battleship Imperatritsa Mariya. Afterwards it was repaired. It was replaced by a modern light in 1987.
Cape Emine Lighthouse		Burgas Province	Cape Emine, 9 kilometres (5.6 mi) south of Obzor 42°42′05″N 27°54′00″E	1880	
St. Anastasia Island Lighthouse		Burgas Province	St. Anastasia Island	1914	
Ahtopol Lighthouse		Burgas Province	Ahtopol	Unknown	

== See also ==
- Lists of lighthouses and lightvessels
