= Staevtsi =

- Village
- Location within Bulgaria
- Coordinates: 43°41′N 28°29′E
- Country: Bulgaria
- Province: Dobrich Province
- Municipality: Shabla
- Time zone: UTC+2 (EET)
  - Summer (DST): UTC+3 (EEST)

Staevtsi is a village in Shabla Municipality, Dobrich Province, northeastern Bulgaria.
