= List of extreme points of Bulgaria =

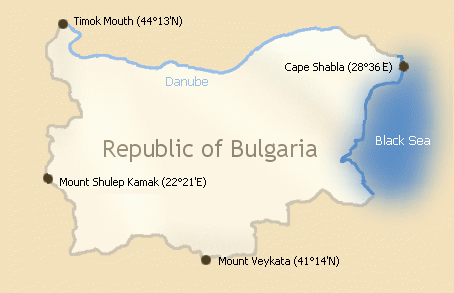
A map of the extreme points of Bulgaria

The extreme points of Bulgaria include the coordinates that are further north, south, east or west than any other location in Bulgaria; and the highest and the lowest elevations in the country. This list excludes Bulgaria's station in Antarctica. With the exception of Cape Shabla, the easternmost location of Bulgaria, all other extreme points are uninhabited.

The latitude and longitude are expressed in decimal degree notation, in which a positive latitude value refers to the northern hemisphere, and a negative value refers to the southern hemisphere. Similarly, a positive longitude value refers to the eastern hemisphere, and a negative value refers to the western hemisphere. The coordinates used in this article are sourced from Google Earth, which makes use of the World Geodetic System (WGS) 84, a geodetic reference system.

== Latitude and longitude ==
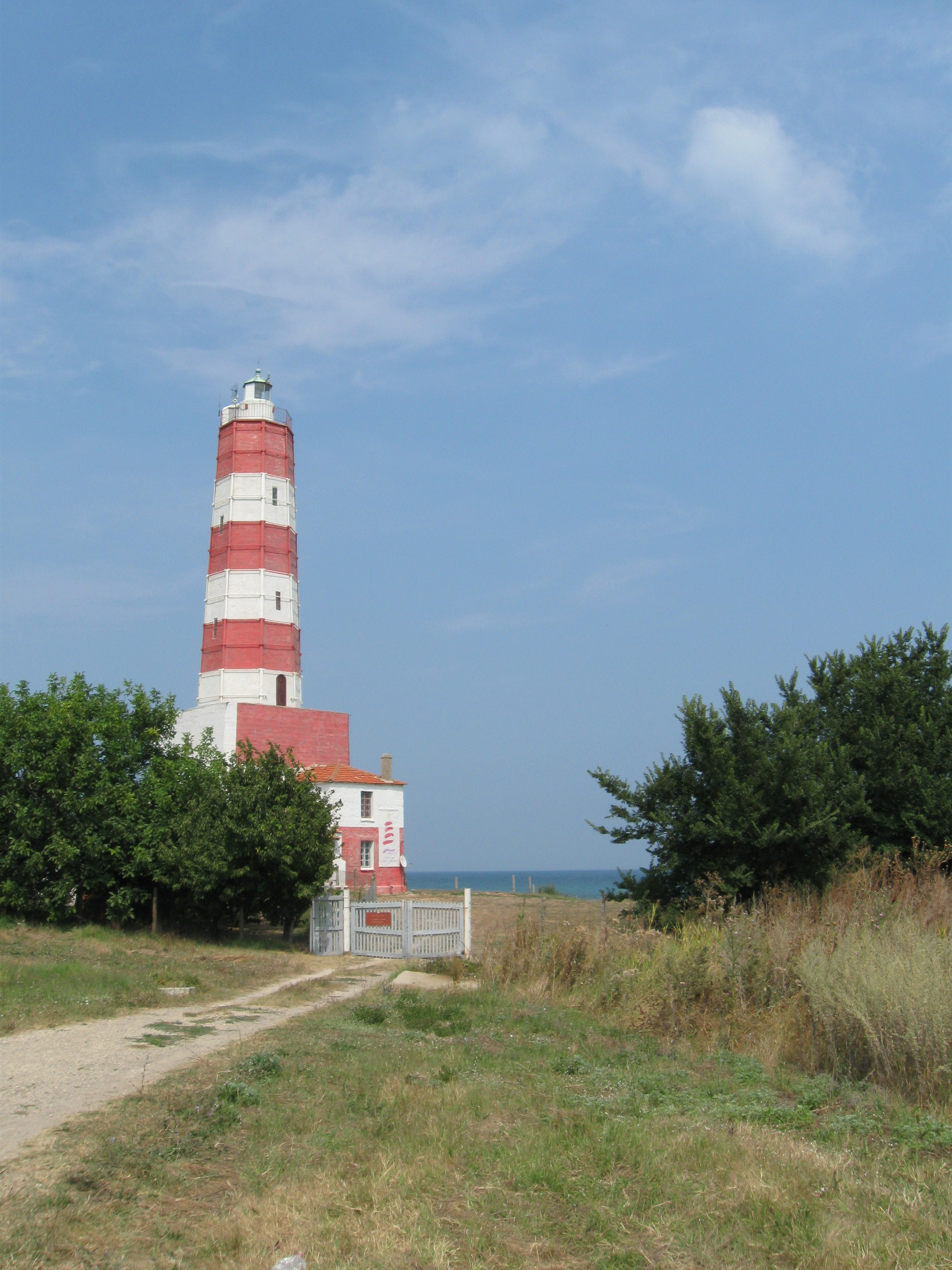
Cape Shabla, Bulgaria's easternmost point

Bulgaria's northernmost point is where the Timok River flows into the Danube. The northern tip of Bulgaria is located in the Vidin Province, and neighbours the Mehedinți County of Romania. The closest Bulgarian village to that area is Vrav. Bulgaria's most southern point is in the Kardzhali Province's Mount Veykata. At 1,463 metres (4,800 ft), Veykata is the highest Bulgarian peak of the Gyumyurdzhinski Snezhnik ridge in the Eastern Rhodope Mountains, and borders the East Macedonia and Thrace periphery of Greece. Bulgaria's westernmost point is in Vrashka chuka saddle. This is the point where the Vidin Province borders both the Zaječar District of Southern and Eastern Serbia. Cape Shabla is Bulgaria's easternmost point; it lies in the Dobrich Province, on the country's Black Sea outlet. This table excludes St. Kliment Ohridski Base, Bulgaria's station in Antarctica.

Heading	Location	Province	Bordering entity	Coordinates (Note: Coordinates obtained from Google Earth. Google Earth makes use of the WGS84 geodetic reference system.)	Ref
North	The Timok's mouth into the Danube	Vidin	Mehedinți County, Romania	44.214555°N 22.67459°E	
South	Mount Veykata	Kardzhali	East Macedonia and Thrace, Greece	41.236022°N 25.288167°E	
West	Vrashka chuka saddle	Vidin	Zaječar District, Southern and Eastern Serbia, Serbia	43.805688°N 22.354275°E	
East	Cape Shabla	Dobrich	Black Sea	43.539550°N 28.607050°E	

== Extreme elevation ==
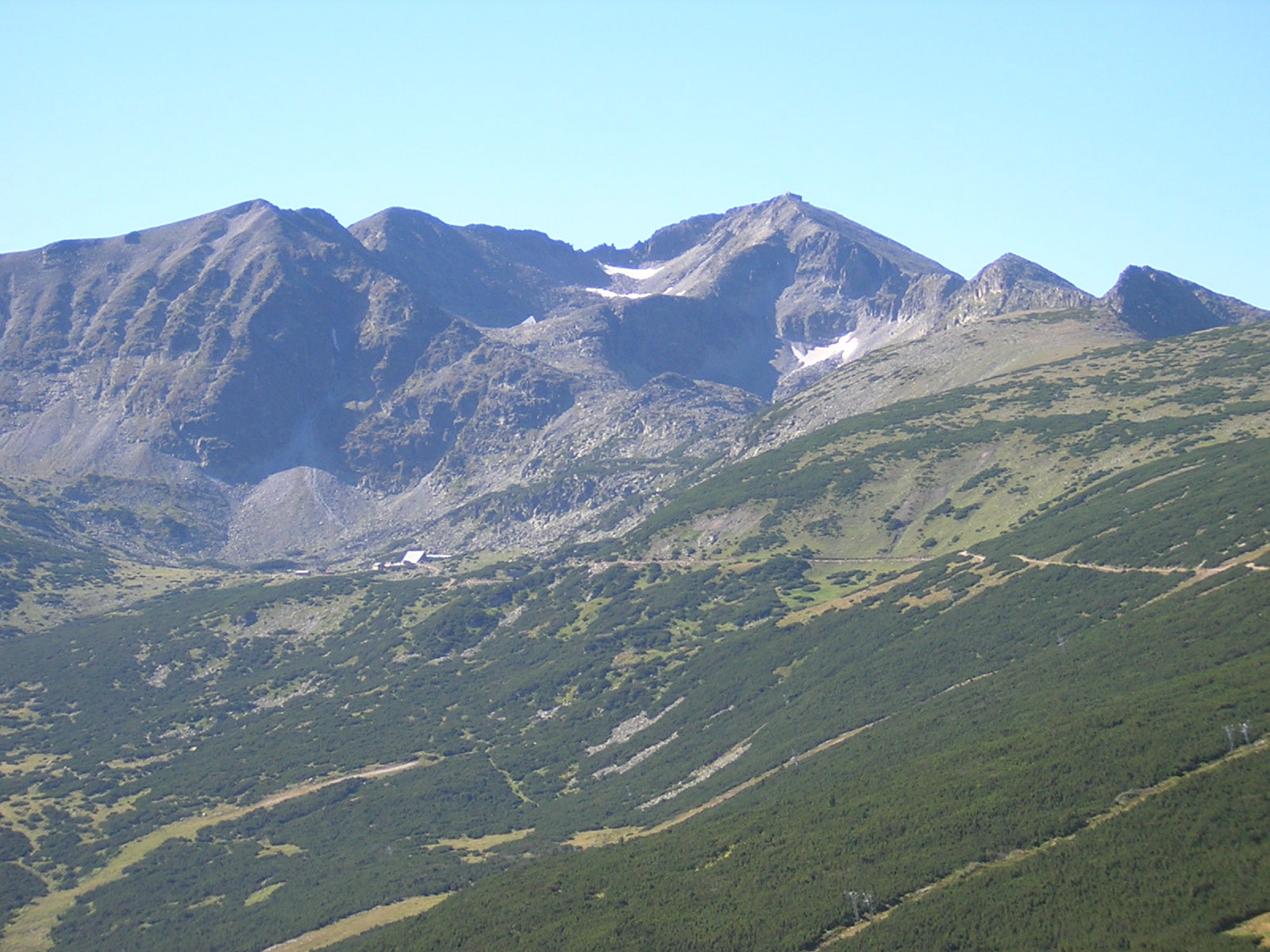
At 2,925.4 m (9,598 ft), Musala is the highest point in Bulgaria.

The highest point in Bulgaria is Mount Musala, which, standing at 2,925.4 m (9,598 ft), is located in the Rila National Park. Musala is part of the Rila mountain range in the Sofia Province. In addition to being Bulgaria's highest point, Musala is also taller than any other peak in the Balkans. Other peaks of comparable height in the vicinity of Musala include Little Musala, standing at 2,902 m (9,521 ft), and Irechek, which is 2,852 m (9,357 ft). Bulgaria's lowest point is located on the coast, with its outlet on the Black Sea. The region stays steady at sea level, and stretches 354 km (220 mi), from the Romanian Black Sea Riviera to Turkey's Marmara region.

Extremity	Name	Elevation	Location	Province	Coordinates	Ref
Highest	Mount Musala	2,925.4 m (9,598 ft)	Rila Mountain, Sofia Province	Sofia	42.1047°N 23.3512°E	
Lowest	Black Sea	0 m (0.0 ft)	Bulgarian Black Sea Coast	Dobrich, Varna, and Burgas	43.5°N 34.5°E	

== See also ==
- Extreme points of Europe
- Extreme points of Earth
- Geography of Bulgaria
