= Tyulenovo =

Tyulenovo Тюленово
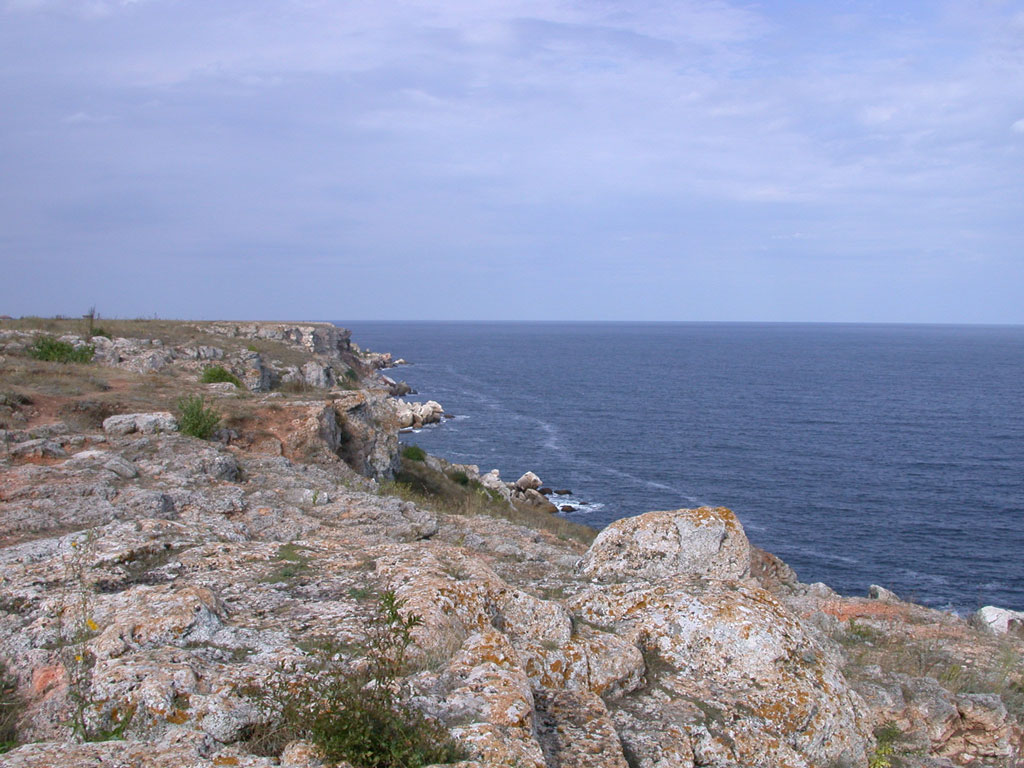
- The rocky shore at Tyulenovo

- Location of Tyulenovo
- Country: Bulgaria
- Provinces (Oblast): Dobrich
- Municipality (Obshtina): Shabla

Government
  - Mayor: Marijan Zhechev
- Elevation: 47 m (154 ft)

Population (2022)
  - Total: 88
- Time zone: UTC+2 (EET)
  - Summer (DST): UTC+3 (EEST)
- Postal Code: 9680
- Area code: 05743

Tyulenovo (Bulgarian: Тюленово, historically Romanian: Calacichioi, Turkish: Kalaç-Köy) is a village and seaside resort on the north Bulgarian Black Sea Coast, part of Shabla Municipality, Dobrich Province.

== Etymology ==
"Tyulenovo" means "Village of seals" in Bulgarian, but seals haven't been seen in the area since the 1980s. The story of their appearance is almost as blurry as their vanishing. It is rumored that Queen Marie of Romania who had a summer palace in the nearby town of Balchik released a pair of seals she had raised for several years.

Its name during Ottoman rule and Romanian rule was Kalaç-Köy (with the meaning of "village of the sword") and Calacichioi, respectively.

== History ==
The settlement was founded in the Ancient period, probably by the ancient Thracians and in the next periods was part of the Roman, Bulgarian and Ottoman empires. The original population of the village was Gagauz . Many Bulgarians chose this place and settled in it in the middle of the 19th century. They came mainly from the interior of the country, mostly from Smyadovo and Kotel. After the Treaty of Craiova, the name of the village was changed in 1942. In 1951, on May 31, the first oil field in Bulgaria was discovered in the village. This date was also chosen for the Tyulenovo fair. In 1954 the enterprise for extraction of gas and oil - "Techni goriva" was established.

The pumps also extract sulfur mineral water. It is curative and has magical properties and can be used against kidney disease and neuralgia.

== Description ==
Tyulenovo can be reached by taking the old seaside road from Kavarna that passes along the rocky coastline, through the sea resort of Rusalka, and village of Kamen Bryag.

There are about 60 permanent inhabitants, but during the summer there are close to 200 people living here. In the center there are two small hotels, a fishing harbor and a small beach. Dolphins can be seen from the coast and they usually come nearer to the land in the early morning or late afternoon. The caves in the cliffs were used as dwellings, and nowadays backpackers set up camp inside for free accommodation. There is also a great sand beach in Bolata, less than 2 kilometers from Tyulenovo.

Further on down the seaside path from Tyulenovo to Kamen Bryag there is a megalithic complex called the Rocky Monasteries (Bulgarian: Скални Манастир). The megalith consists of tombs carved into the rock and sacrificial stones used by the ancient cult of the Sun. More information about the whole area can be found at the tourist center in the village of Balgarevo where recently discovered artifacts from the Durankulak Eneolithic settlement, belonging to one of the world's earliest civilizations, are also on display.

== See also ==
- Black Sea
- Eastern Europe
