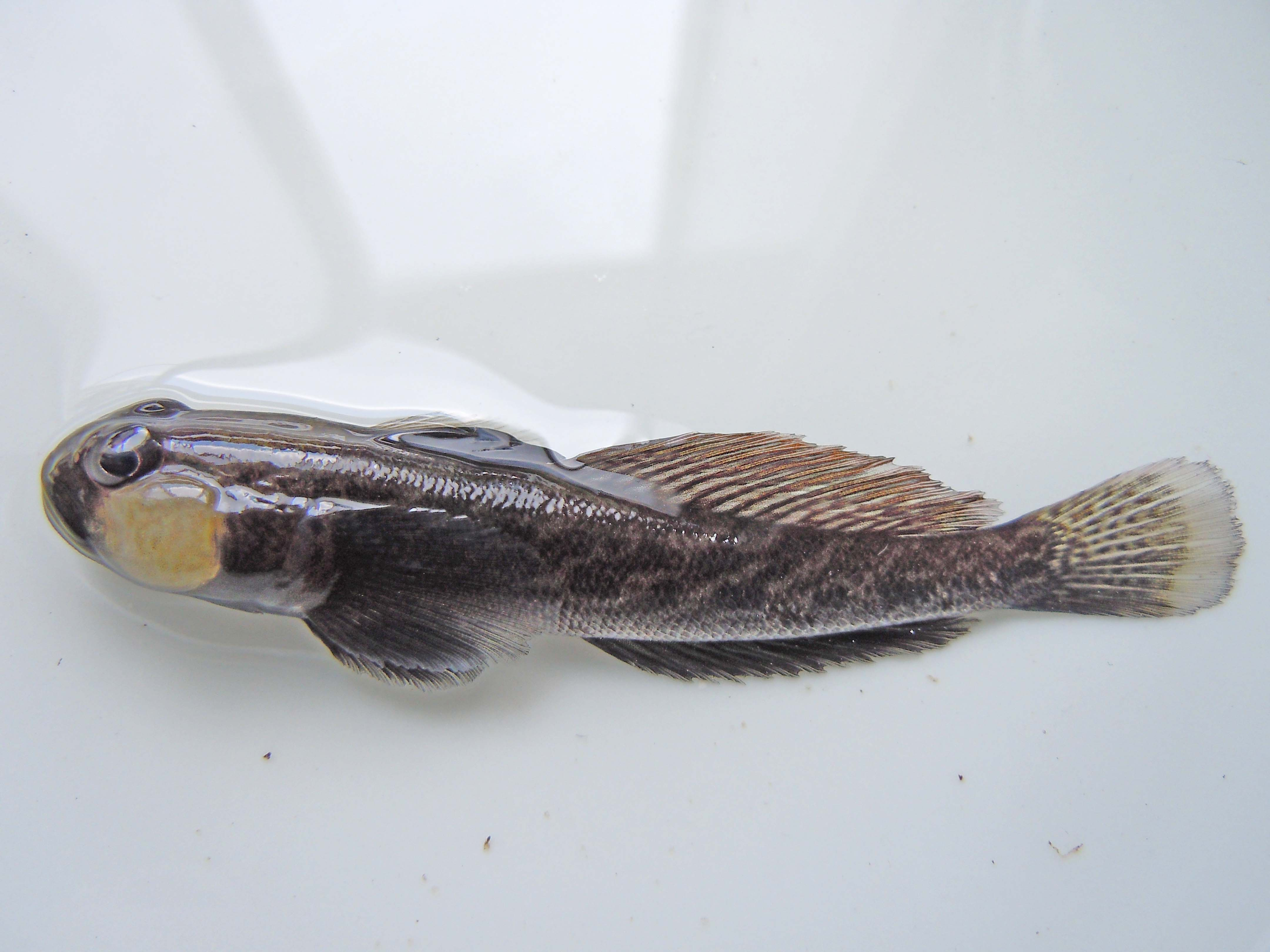
- Racer goby (B. gymnotrachelus)

Scientific classification
- Kingdom: Animalia
- Phylum: Chordata
- Class: Actinopterygii
- Order: Gobiiformes
- Family: Gobiidae
- Subfamily: Gobiinae
- Genus: Babka; Iljin, 1927

= Babka (fish) =

Genus of fishes

Babka is a genus of gobies. Native to Black Sea and the Caspian Sea basins, one species B. gymnotrachelus, has been introduced to several rivers that drain into the Baltic Sea as well as the middle Danube River.

== Species ==
There are currently two recognized species in this genus:

- Babka gymnotrachelus (Kessler, 1857) (racer goby)
- Babka macrophthalma (Kessler, 1877)
