= Kaliakra Lighthouse =

Bulgarian lighthouse

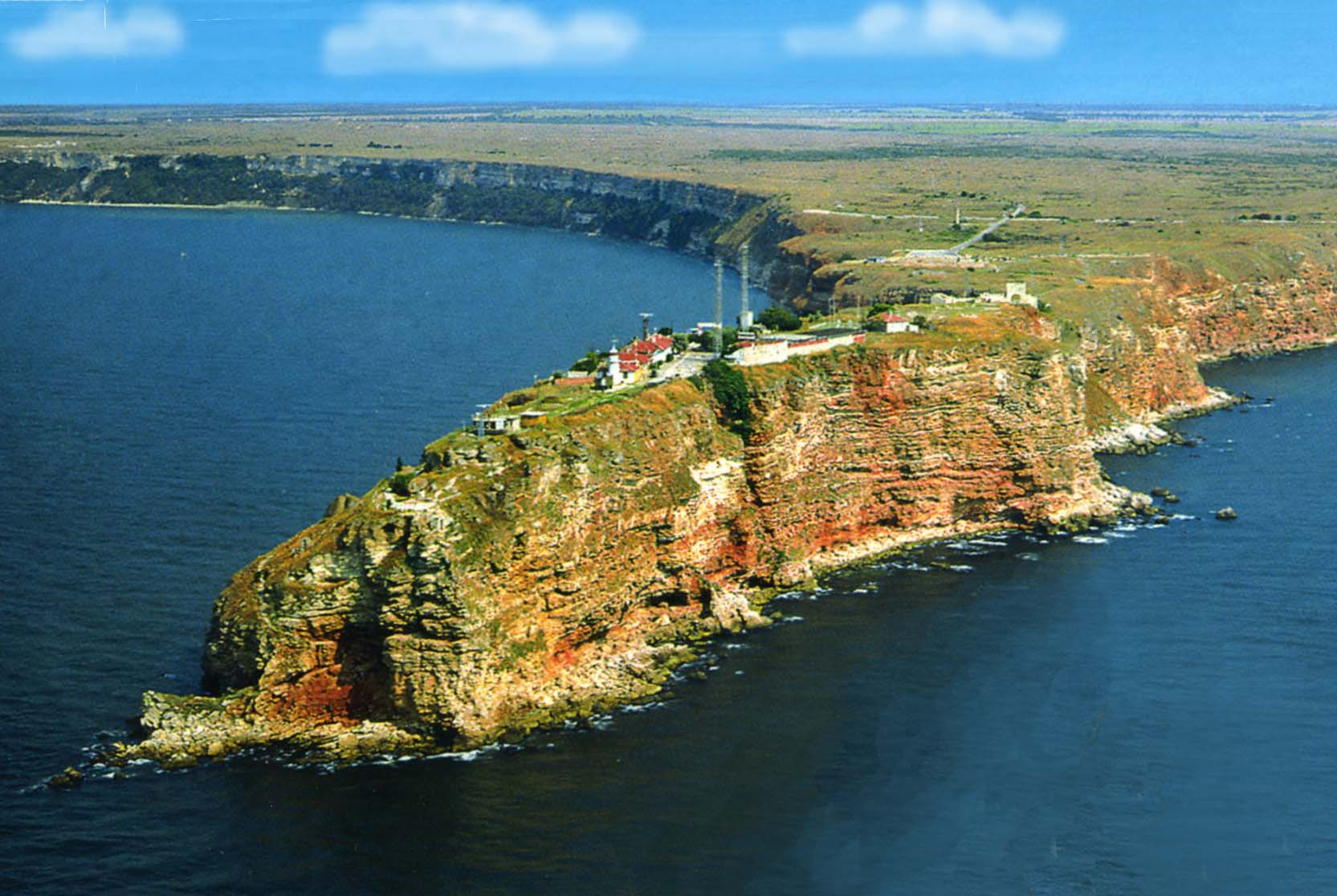
- Location: Cape Kaliakra; Bulgaria
- Coordinates: 43°21′43.0″N 28°27′55.8″E

Tower
- Constructed: 1866 (first)
- Construction: limestone tower
- Height: 8 metres (26 ft)
- Shape: cylindrical tower with balcony and lantern
- Markings: white tower and lantern, black rail

Light
- First lit: 1901 (current)
- Focal height: 68 metres (223 ft)
- Range: 20 nautical miles (37 km; 23 mi)
- Characteristic: Fl W 5s.

Kaliakra Lighthouse (Bulgarian: Калиакра морски фар) - a lighthouse located in the Southern Dobruja Region on the northern part of Bulgaria's coast of the Black Sea; in Bulgaria. The cylindrical stone lighthouse was built in 1901, with a lantern and gallery rising from the top of the lighthouse keeper's house; both painted white.

== See also ==
- List of lighthouses in Bulgaria
