= Mogilishte =

- Village
- Location within Bulgaria
- Coordinates: 43°29′N 28°20′E
- Country: Bulgaria
- Province: Dobrich Province
- Municipality: Kavarna
- Time zone: UTC+2 (EET)
  - Summer (DST): UTC+3 (EEST)

Mogilishte (Bulgarian: Могилище [moˈɡiliʃtɛ]) is a village in Kavarna Municipality, Dobrich Province, northeastern Bulgaria. The source of Shablenska reka lies to the northeast.
