= Gorichane =

- Village
- Location within Bulgaria
- Coordinates: 43°32′N 28°27′E
- Country: Bulgaria
- Province: Dobrich Province
- Municipality: Shabla
- Time zone: UTC+2 (EET)
  - Summer (DST): UTC+3 (EEST)

Gorichane is a village in Shabla Municipality, Dobrich Province, northeastern Bulgaria.

== Honours ==
Gorichane Glacier on Brabant Island, Antarctica is named after the village.
