= Durankulak =

Durankulak Дуранкулак
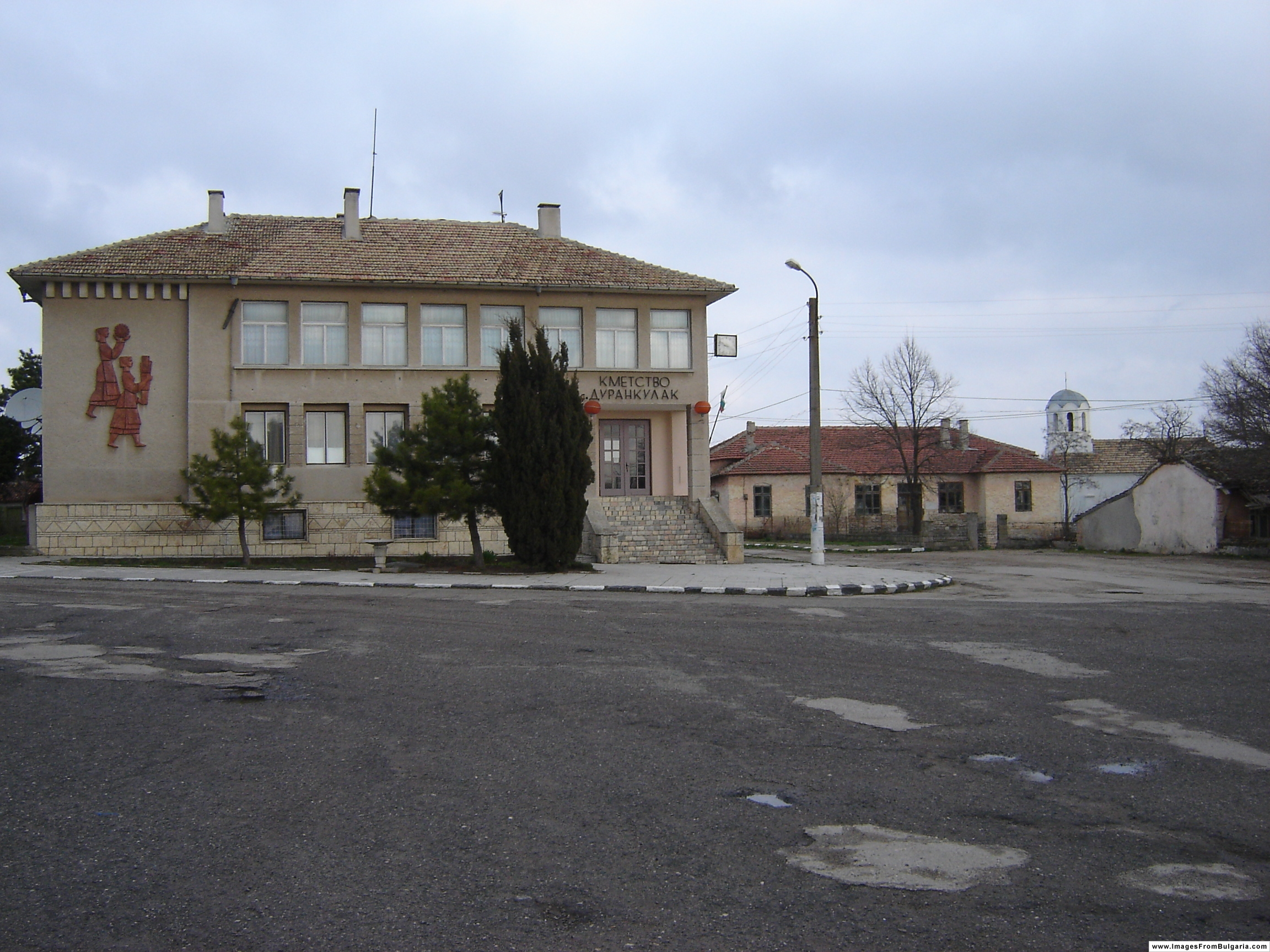
- Durankulak Town Hall

- Location of Durankulak
- Coordinates: 43°42′N 28°31′E
- Country: Bulgaria
- Provinces (Oblast): Dobrich

Government
  - Mayor: Zyumbyul Medarov
- Elevation: 26 m (85 ft)

Population (2008)
  - Total: 471
- Time zone: UTC+2 (EET)
  - Summer (DST): UTC+3 (EEST)
- Postal Code: 9670
- Area code: 05748

Durankulak (Bulgarian: Дуранкулак) is a village in northeastern Bulgaria, part of Shabla Municipality, Dobrich Province. Located in the historical region of Southern Dobruja, Durankulak is the north-easternmost inhabited place in Bulgaria and the northernmost village of the Bulgarian Black Sea Coast, although the village itself is slightly inland. Durankulak lies north of the town of Shabla, with the only places to the north along the coast being the formerly exclusively Czechoslovak camping site Kosmos and the Kartalburun and Sivriburun headlands. Durankulak is also the name of the nearby border checkpoint on the Bulgarian-Romanian border; just north of the border is the Romanian seaside resort Vama Veche.

As of 2008, Durankulak has a population of 471 and the mayor is Zyumbyul Medarov. The village lies at an elevation of 26 metres above mean sea level, on the E87 littoral road, 6 kilometres south of the Romanian border. Durankulak lies 100 km from Varna, 68 km from Dobrich and 60 km from Constanţa.

The coastal Lake Durankulak is located to the southeast and the Durankulak Swamp or Eagles' Swamp (Орлово блато, Orlovo blato) is to the northeast, towards the Black Sea— the two are connected by an artificial but overgrown marshy canal. To the northeast of the village is also the Anna Maria beach that continues up to Sivriburun and the border. There is another beach south of the village which extends to Krapets.

The village has a cultural centre (chitalishte) with a big hall and a small hall, a museum of local history, a small art gallery and a library. There are several monuments dedicated to the peasant revolt of 1900 dating to the 1970s and 1980s. The local Bulgarian Orthodox church was built in 1942.

== History ==
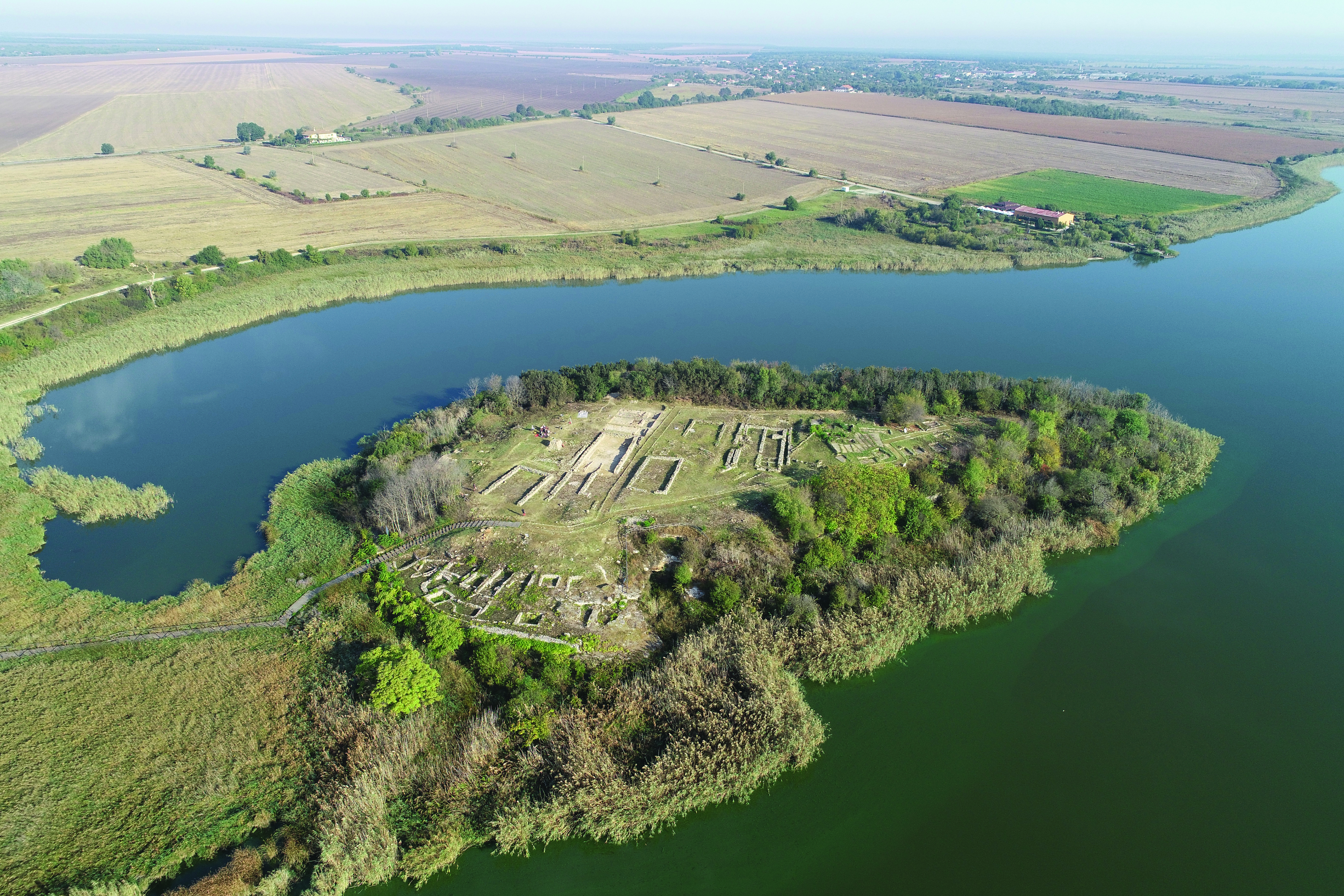
The settlement mound “Golemiya ostrov” near the village of Durankulak. Aerial photograph from 2019, view from the south.

The Durankulak settlement commenced on a small island, approximately 7000 BC and lasted for thousand years. The first inhabitants were the Hamangia culture, dated from the middle of the 6th millennium to the middle of 5th millennium BC, and were the first manifestation of the Neolithic life in Dobruzha. Hamangia people were small-scale cultivators and plant collectors who built houses, made pottery, herded and hunted animals. Around 4700/4600 BC the stone architecture was already in general use and became a characteristic phenomenon that was unique in Europe. The settlement in Durankulak was a well-organized aggregation of buildings of substantial size with several rooms. They were coherently laid out according to a plan that was repeated over successive generations of house reconstructions. Buildings were rectilinear and large, narrow paths separated individual houses, which stood alone or abutted by other buildings. The structures were robust and made of large wooden posts sunk into foundation trenches and joined together with wooden planks or branches covered with mud or clay. In all building horizons, except for in the earliest ones, buildings were internally divided into separate, mainly rectilinear, rooms. Stone structures and bases from the houses are well preserved and there is a cave and some cisterns to see. Durankulak is one of few monuments left from early farming societies in Europe and tell us about daily life. The excavation in Durankulak took part between 1974 and 1997 when 1204 prehistoric burials were carefully recorded and the remains of 17 houses were found.

The oldest village at this place was the small village of Kartalii to the northeast of modern Durankulak. It was abandoned in the middle of the 19th century and had around 200–300 residents, but its location meant the danger of malaria made it unsuitable for living in the summer. Some of the population of Kartalii founded Durankulak, which used to be an Ottoman farm inhabited by a few Bulgarians. The bulk of Durankulak's residents were, however, settlers from the eastern Balkan Mountains who arrived in the early 19th century. After the Liberation of Bulgaria in 1878, it became part of the Principality of Bulgaria and, as the largest village in the region, was a municipal centre of 12 villages. On 1 June 1900, the village was the centre of an economic revolt against the government of Todor Ivanchov and as a result 40 people (none of them locals) were killed by the national cavalry.

Between 1913 and 1940, it was under Romanian rule along with all of Southern Dobruja and was renamed to Răcari, but it was returned to Bulgaria according to the Treaty of Craiova. According to the terms of that treaty, the native Bulgarian population of Northern Dobruja was exchanged with the Romanian and Aromanian colonists sent in the south during the period of Romanian rule. As a result, some Northern Dobrujan Bulgarian refugees (преселци, preseltsi) settled in Durankulak. Most of them were from Nuntaşi not far from the Danube Delta and today form around half of the village's population. From its return to Bulgaria to 1963, the village was known as Blatnitsa (Блатница, "marshy place"), but its historic name was reinstated to commemorate the revolt of 1900. The name is of ancient origin meaning the place where the taurus knocked with his fist (hoof) and gushed water surrounded the two isles in the lake. Its like a legend of the chosen land for ever giving life and prosperity. The barelefs and golden ornamentations of tauruses were found in tracian tombs, romans burial barelefs and in Varna Necropolis.

== Lake Durankulak ==
Lake Durankulak
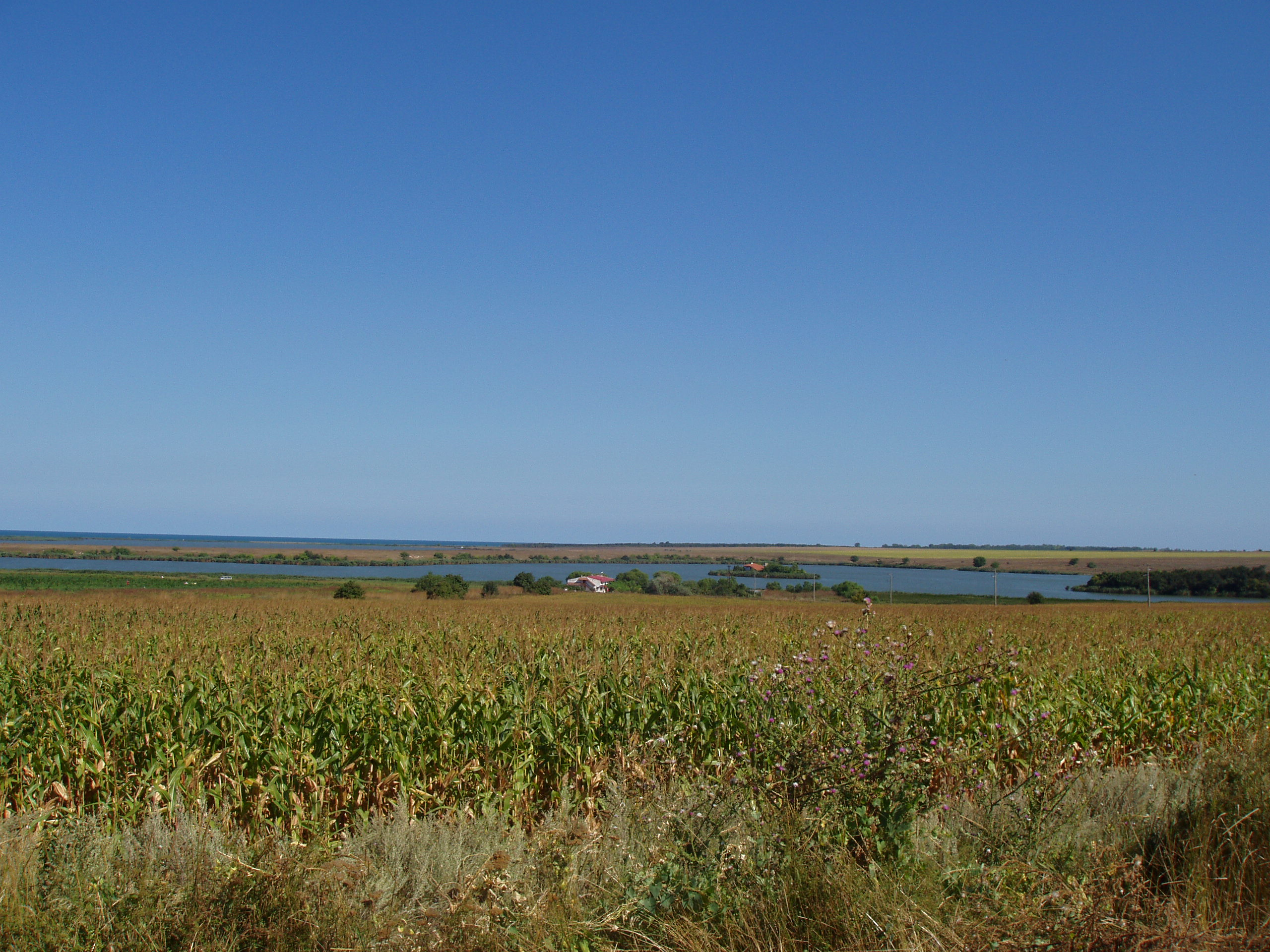
- View of Lake Durankulak

- Location within Bulgaria
- Coordinates: 43.672°N 28.547°E
- Basin countries: Bulgaria
- Surface area: 4 km^{2} (1.5 sq mi)
- Islands: 2 (Big Island, Small Island)

Ramsar Wetland
- Official name: Durankulak Lake
- Designated: 28 November 1984
- Reference no.: 293

The freshwater Lake Durankulak is separated from the Black Sea by sand dunes and a beach strip, it has an area of around 4 square kilometres and features two islands in its western part, the Big Island (0.02 km^{2}) and the Small Island (0.0053 km^{2}). As the habitat of 260 rare and endangered species, the lake is one of the most important and well-preserved coastal wetlands in Bulgaria. Among the important birds in the area are the little bittern, ferruginous duck, mute swan, western marsh harrier, paddyfield warbler. The greater white-fronted goose, red-breasted goose and mallard spend the winter there, and there are large populations of the pygmy cormorant and great white pelican.

The lake is also an archaeologically important area. Pithouses of the oldest known inhabitants of Dobruja, dating to 5100–4700 BC, have been unearthed near the west shore, as well as 3500–3400 BC mound burials and a Sarmatian necropolis from Late Antiquity. The Big Island of Lake Durankulak is particularly important, as it is the site of an Eneolithic settlement of 4600–4200 BC, a cultural monument of national importance. The island also features a 1300–1200 BC fortified settlement, a Hellenistic rock-hewn cave sanctuary of Cybele (3rd century BC) and a Bulgar settlement from the 9th–10th century AD. Because of its age and importance, the archaeological complex has been dubbed the "Bulgarian Troy".
