= Shabla Municipality =

Shabla Municipality Община Шабла
- Municipality
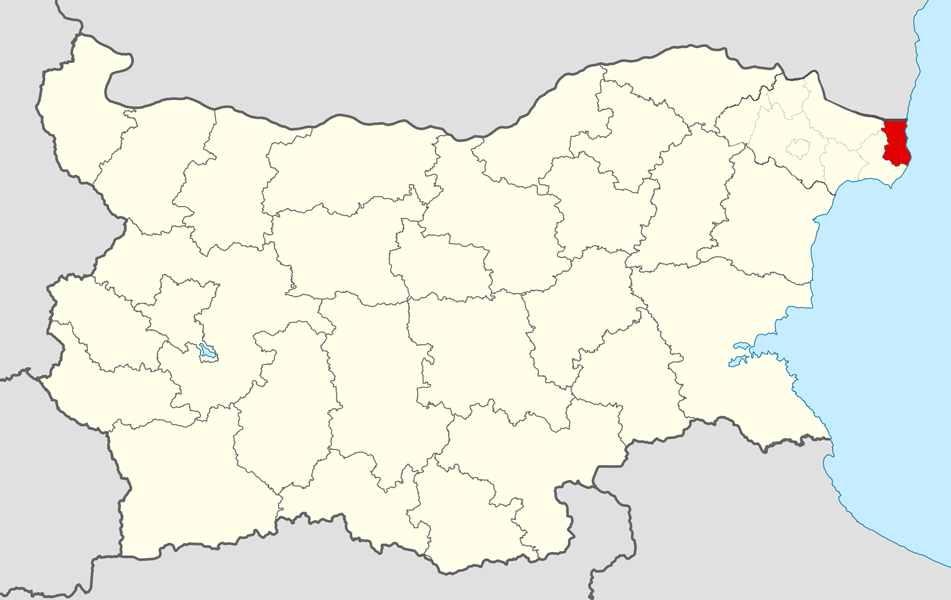
- Shabla Municipality within Bulgaria and Dobrich Province.
- Coordinates: 43°36′N 28°31′E
- Country: Bulgaria
- Province (Oblast): Dobrich
- Admin. centre (Obshtinski tsentar): Shabla

Area
  - Total: 329.64 km^{2} (127.27 sq mi)

Population (December 2009)
  - Total: 5,580
  - Density: 16.9/km^{2} (43.8/sq mi)
- Time zone: UTC+2 (EET)
  - Summer (DST): UTC+3 (EEST)
- Website: www.balchik.bg/bg/index

Shabla Municipality (Bulgarian: Община Шабла) is a municipality (obshtina) in Dobrich Province, Bulgaria, located in the north-easternmost part of the country on the Northern Bulgarian Black Sea Coast in Southern Dobruja geographical region, bounded by Romania to the north. It is named after its administrative centre - the town of Shabla.

The municipality embraces a territory of 329.64 km^{2} (127.27 sq mi) with a population of 5,580 inhabitants, as of December 2009.

The area is best known with Cape Shabla - Bulgaria's easternmost point as well as the natural reserve of Durankulak Lake. The main road E87 crosses the municipality connecting the port of Varna with the Romanian port of Konstanza.

== Settlements ==
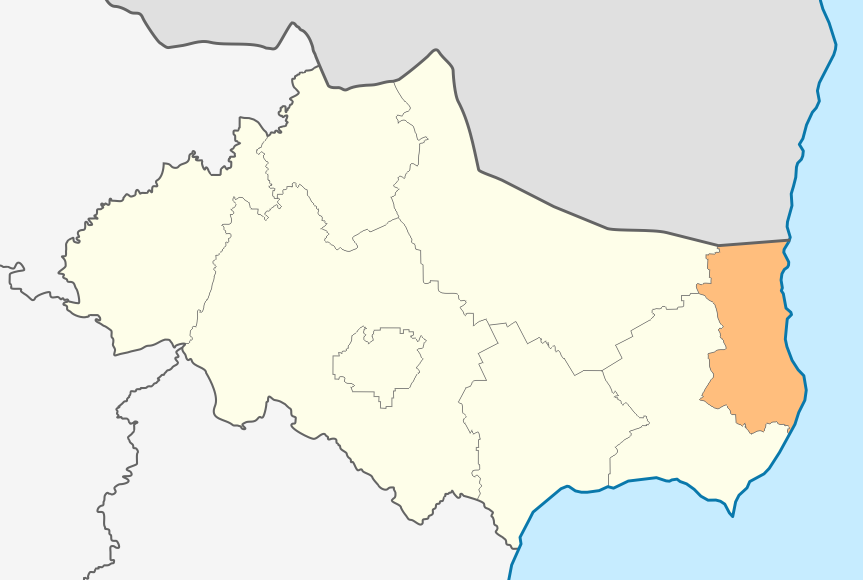
Shabla Municipality within Dobrich Province

Shabla Municipality includes the following 16 places (towns are shown in bold):

Town/Village	Cyrillic	Population (December 2009)
**Shabla**	**Шабла**	3,586
Bozhanovo	Божаново	15
Chernomortsi	Черноморци	80
Durankulak	Дуранкулак	455
Ezerets	Езерец	183
Gorichane	Горичане	95
Gorun	Горун	105
Granichar	Граничар	163
Krapets	Крапец	378
Prolez	Пролез	56
Smin	Смин	78
Staevtsi	Стаевци	8
Tvarditsa	Твърдица	11
Tyulenovo	Тюленово	59
Vaklino	Ваклино	195
Zahari Stoyanovo	Захари Стояново	113
Total		5,580

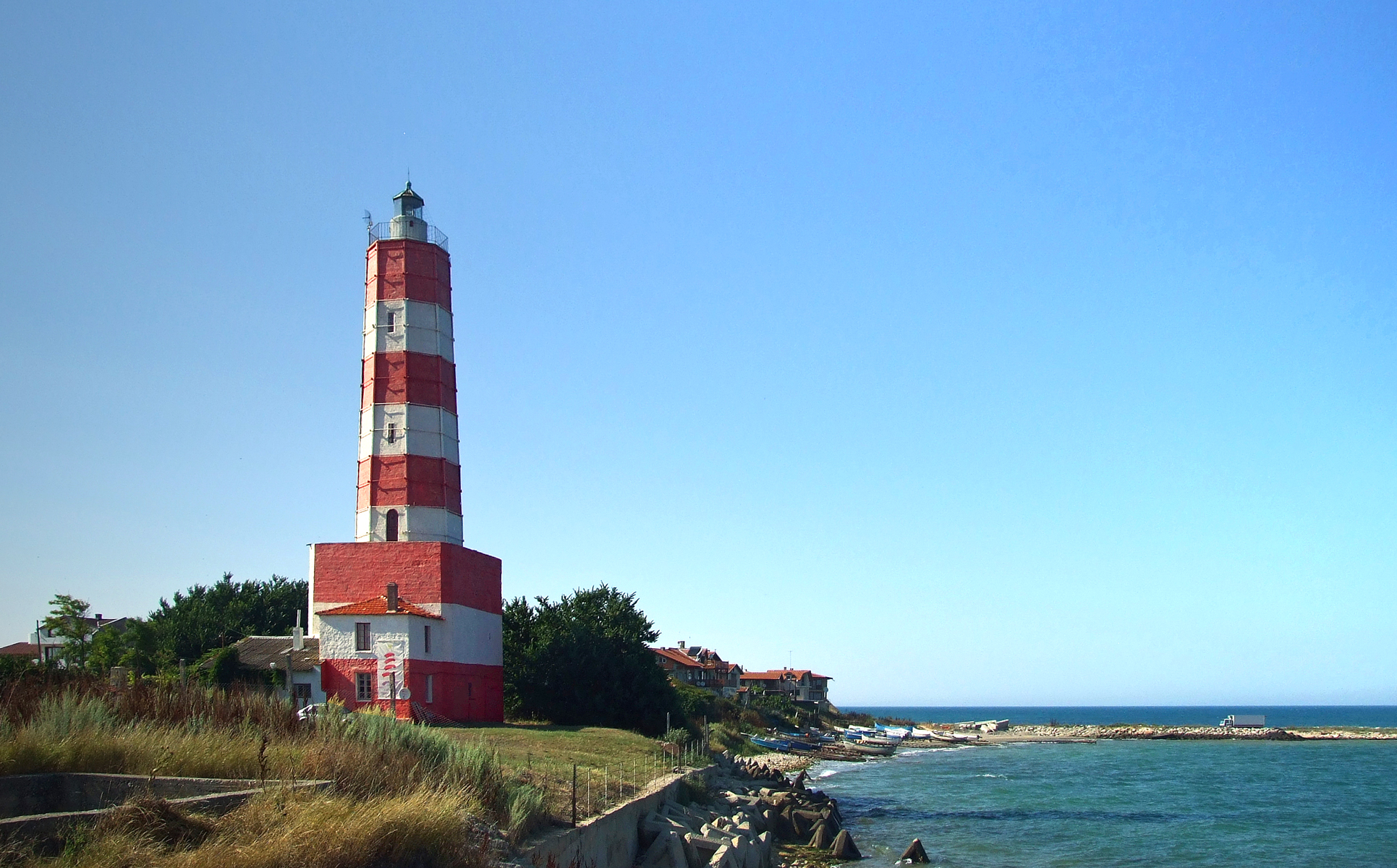
Cape Shabla Lighthouse - The easternmost point of Bulgaria.

== Demography ==
The following table shows the change of the population during the last four decades.

Shabla Municipality
**Year**	1975	1985	1992	**2001**	2005	2007	2009	**2011**
**Population**	9,261	8,375	7,508	6,380	5,959	5,759	5,580	...
Sources: Census 2001, Census 2011, „pop-stat.mashke.org“,

=== Religion ===
According to the latest Bulgarian census of 2011, the religious composition, among those who answered the optional question on religious identification, was the following:

Religious composition of Shabla Municipality
Orthodox Christianity	86.0%
Catholicism	0.6%
Protestantism	0.0%
Islam	1.9%
No religion	2.7%
Prefer not to answer, others and indefinable	8.8%

== See also ==
- Provinces of Bulgaria
- Municipalities of Bulgaria
- List of cities and towns in Bulgaria
