= Tyulenovo oil field =

Bulgarian oil field in the Black Sea

Tyulenovo
- Country: Bulgaria
- Region: Black Sea
- Offshore/onshore: offshore

Field history
- Discovery: 1951
- Start of development: 1951
- Start of production: 1951

Production
- Estimated oil in place: 4.2 million tonnes (~ 5×10^{6} m^{3} or 30 million bbl)
- Estimated gas in place: 860×10^{6} m^{3} 30×10^{9} cu ft

The Tyulenovo field is a Bulgarian oil field that was discovered in 1951 and located on the continental shelf of the Black Sea. It began production in 1951 and produces oil and natural gas. The total proven reserves of the Tyulenovo oil field are around 30 million barrels (4,800,000 m^{3}), and production will be centered on 500 barrels per day (79 m^{3}/d) in 2015.
