= Festuca vaginata =

Scientific classification
- Kingdom: Plantae
- Clade: Tracheophytes
- Clade: Angiosperms
- Clade: Monocots
- Clade: Commelinids
- Order: Poales
- Family: Poaceae
- Subfamily: Pooideae
- Genus: Festuca
- Species: F. vaginata

Binomial name
- Festuca vaginata Waldst. & Kit. ex Willd.

Synonyms
- List: Festuca ovina var. vaginata (Waldst. & Kit. ex Willd.) Wimm. & Grab.; Bromus glaucus Rchb.; Festuca amethystina Host; Festuca arenaria Kit. ex Steud.; Festuca cana Kit. ex Steud.; Festuca dominii Krajina; Festuca glauca subsp. buiae Prodan; Festuca neilreicheana J.Vetter; Festuca ovina var. amethystina Alef.; Festuca ovina f. mucronata Hack.; Festuca psammophila subsp. dominii (Krajina) P.Šmarda; Festuca teyberi Vetter; Festuca trigenea J.Vetter; Festuca vaginata var. aristata Pawlus; Festuca vaginata subsp. buiae (Prodan) Beldie; Festuca vaginata subsp. dominii (Krajina) Soó; Festuca vaginata var. dominii (Krajina) Soó; Festuca vaginata var. dubia Beldie; Festuca vaginata subvar. mucronata (Hack.) Soó; Poa glauca var. vaginata Wimm. & Grab.

Species of grass

Festuca vaginata is a species of grass in the family Poaceae. The species was first published in 1809. This species is native to East Central Europe, and Ukraine.

== Habitat ==
Festuca vaginata is a perennial and mainly grows in temperate biomes.
