= Tvarditsa, Dobrich Province =

Tvarditsa
- Village
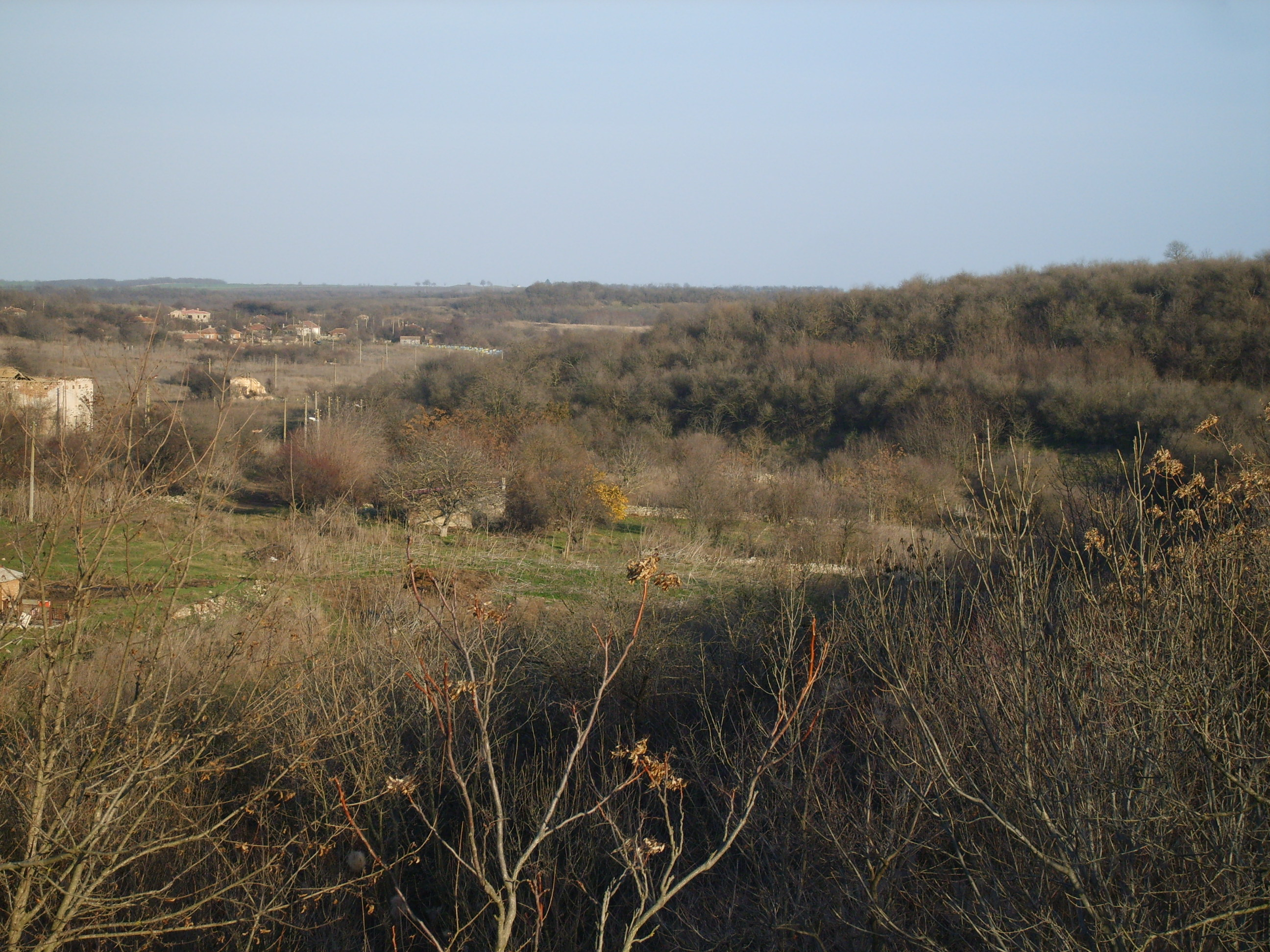
- General view of village Tvarditsa, Dobrich District, Bulgaria

- Location within Bulgaria
- Coordinates: 43°37′N 28°27′E
- Country: Bulgaria
- Province: Dobrich Province
- Municipality: Shabla
- Time zone: UTC+2 (EET)
  - Summer (DST): UTC+3 (EEST)

Tvarditsa is a village in Shabla Municipality, in the Dobrich Province of northeastern Bulgaria.
