= Smin, Bulgaria =

Smin
- Village
- Location within Bulgaria
- Coordinates: 43°40′N 28°28′E
- Country: Bulgaria
- Province: Dobrich Province
- Municipality: Shabla
- Time zone: UTC+2 (EET)
  - Summer (DST): UTC+3 (EEST)

Smin is a village in Shabla Municipality, Dobrich Province, northeastern Bulgaria.

Smin Peak on Trinity Peninsula in Antarctica is named after the village.
