= Bozhanovo =

Coordinates: 43°37′N 28°29′E

- Village
- Interactive map of Bozhanovo
- Country: Bulgaria
- Province: Dobrich Province
- Municipality: Shabla
- Time zone: UTC+2 (EET)
  - Summer (DST): UTC+3 (EEST)

Bozhanovo is a village in Shabla Municipality, Dobrich Province, northeastern Bulgaria. It is located within the Eastern European Time Zone (GMT+2).
