= Granichar, Dobrich Province =

Granichar
- Village
- Location in Bulgaria
- Coordinates: 43.721°N 28.503°E
- Country: Bulgaria
- Province: Dobrich Province
- Municipality: Shabla
- Time zone: UTC+2 (EET)
  - Summer (DST): UTC+3 (EEST)

Granichar is a village in Shabla Municipality, Dobrich Province, northeastern Bulgaria.
