= Zahari Stoyanovo, Dobrich Province =

Zahari Stoyanovo
- Village
- Location in Bulgaria
- Coordinates: 43.693°N 28.456°E
- Country: Bulgaria
- Province: Dobrich Province
- Municipality: Shabla
- Time zone: UTC+2 (EET)
  - Summer (DST): UTC+3 (EEST)

Zahari Stoyanovo is a village in Shabla Municipality, Dobrich Province, northeastern Bulgaria.
