= Vaklino =

- Village
- Location within Bulgaria
- Coordinates: 43°39′N 28°30′E
- Country: Bulgaria
- Province: Dobrich Province
- Municipality: Shabla
- Time zone: UTC+2 (EET)
  - Summer (DST): UTC+3 (EEST)

Vaklino is a village in Shabla Municipality, Dobrich Province, northeastern Bulgaria. The village is located few minutes from the border with Romania. While the village of Vaklino is relatively quiet, it is just across the border from Vama Veche, a Romanian town very popular (for its size) among backpackers.
