= Lake Shabla =

Lake in Bulgaria

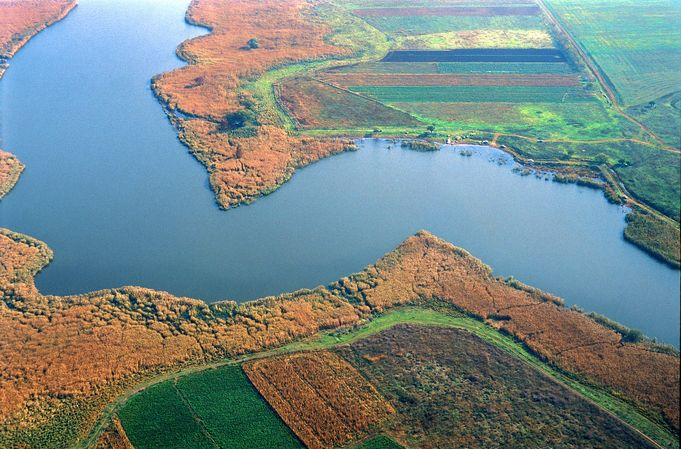
- Lake Shabla

- Location within Bulgaria
- Location: Black Sea
- Coordinates: 43°34′23″N 28°33′56″E
- Ocean/sea sources: Atlantic Ocean
- Basin countries: Bulgaria
- Settlements: Shabla

Ramsar Wetland
- Designated: 19 March 1996
- Reference no.: 801

Lake Shabla (Bulgarian: Шабленско езеро) is a lagoon (liman) in the north-eastern Bulgaria, which separated from the Black Sea by the sandbar. The area of the water body is 0.8 km2, depth 0.4–4 m, salinity 0,4%. The lagoon is located on 3 km east from the town of Shabla.
