= Shabla =

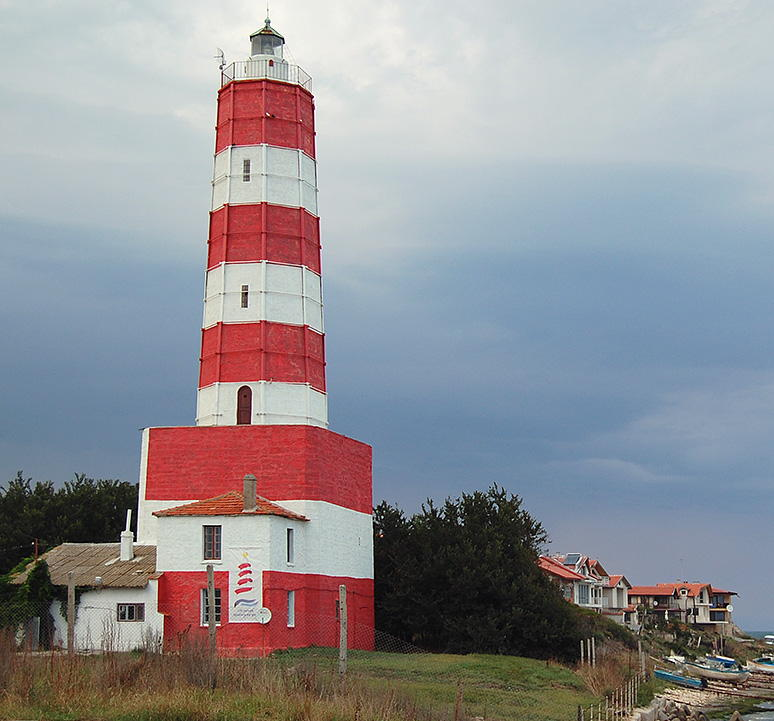

- Coat of arms

- Location of Shabla
- Coordinates: 43°32′N 28°32′E
- Country: Bulgaria
- Provinces (Oblast): Dobrich

Government
  - Mayor: Mariyan Zhechev (GERB)
- Elevation: 47 m (154 ft)

Population (2020)
  - Total: 4,000
- Time zone: UTC+2 (EET)
  - Summer (DST): UTC+3 (EEST)
- Postal Code: 9680
- Area code: 05743
- Website: shabla.bg

Shabla (Bulgarian: Шабла [ˈʃabɫɐ]) is a town and seaside resort in northeastern Bulgaria, administrative centre of the Shabla Municipality part of Dobrich Province. Shabla municipality includes the following villages: Bojanovo, Chernomortsi, Durankulak, Ezerets, Gorichane, Gorun, Granichar, Krapets, Prolez, Smin, Staevtsi, Tvarditsa, Tyulenovo, Vaklino, and Zahari Stoyanovo. As of December 2009, the town itself had a population of 3,586 inhabitants. It is situated on the Bulgarian Black Sea Coast in the vicinity of the salt-water Lake Shabla and Bulgaria's easternmost point, Cape Shabla.

Shabla has an extensive white sand beach and was a popular destination for Eastern Bloc tourism until the fall of Communism. The beach itself is located some 5 km from the town (shuttle service in summer) via a road constructed under the EU Phare programme

On the main town beach there is a large car park and many old bungalows next to a large restaurant that serves today's tourists in the summer months. The beaches, and generally the seaside in the municipality, are famous for the untouched nature and virgin beaches.

Another route leads you to the coastal road and past Shabla's lighthouse which is the tallest, oldest and easternmost one on the Bulgarian coast. Set among the ruins of the 4th-century fortress, it was built in its modern appearance during the Crimean War and opened on 15 July 1856, though it is in fact a reconstructed older lighthouse built between 1756 and 1786. Its tower is 28.23 m-tall.

The next village along this route and moving South is Tyulenovo and the start of the rocky coast and high cliffs that stretch through Kamen Bryag to the small bay of Kavarna.

Shabla in antiquity was an ancient Thracian settlement founded 6th to 5th century BC and known by the Greek name of Karon Limen (Carian Bay) that grew into a Black Sea port in Roman times. The town flourished in the early years of the Byzantine Empire, a fortress still being preserved from the period (4th century). During Ottoman rule it was known as Karamanly

== History ==
=== Late Neolithic and Chalcolithic ===
According to the mayor of the city, the oldest technologically advanced gold in the world was discovered near him, preceding by five hundred years the major finds from the Varna Chalcolithic necropolis. Prehistoric settlements conventionally called Shabla I and Shabla II, synchronous with the durankulak, were discovered and explored in 1974 by Prof. Henrieta Todorova in the New Vineyards area, east of the present town between the Shabla Tuzla and Shabla Lake sites. Their inhabitants maintained relations with the population living in the south along the Black Sea coast.

==== Ancient Caria ====
3D model of the Late Roman/Byzantine fortress of ancient Caria.

In ancient times, the Thracian tribe of the Gethites inhabited these places, the area being part of the Odrisian kingdom. Numerous Thracian tombstones rise in the vicinity and bear witness to this era. Ancient Thracian settlement from the 6th to 5th centuries BC, which grew at the end of the 2nd century BC. in a port city, it was discovered near the present-day Kariya fishing village on Cape Shabla. The port city of Caria in the bay south of Cape Shabla is identified with the ancient "Portus Karia (Port Caria) / Καρών Λιμένα (Karon Limen)" - the Port of Karate and was the most important transit port in the 6th to 5th century. BC. to the 6th century AD. - Ancient Thracian Korea 1100 years providing the way through the Thracian Chersonesos (Bosphorus) to the mouth of the Danube and Pantikapei (Crimea), turned into a fortress by the Romans, last reconstructed in the 4th century during the early Byzantine era. It is evidenced by Arian, the Anonymous Periplus of the Black Sea, and the Roman geographer Pomponius Mela in his work "Geography" in the middle of the 1st century AD, indicating that it is located between Kalatis (today Mangalia) and Tristis (Kaliakra). at Shabla's nose. Ever since then, the Cape has been an important navigation landmark along the west coast of the Euxine Pont. A "fire watch" was maintained here, and in Roman times a tower with constant fire. This is confirmed by the divers found on the seabed by divers to the northeast of the present headlamp columns and a stylized cuckoo head made of marble. The findings from the excavations are stored in the museum in Dobrich and in the House of Culture in the city. Given the meaning of the word "Portus / Limen", it can be assumed that the ancient port of Cape Shabla was artificially created. According to Karel Shkorpil, it was a rectangular basin, 280 m long and 120 m wide, bordered on the north, east and south by three stone breakwaters, in the middle of which there was one entrance. Modern underwater studies have specified the plan of the ancient port - it consisted of two parts: the first - a relatively shallow pool of approximately 400/150 m, surrounded by north and east reefs, which in their present form successfully fulfill the role of natural breakwater, which is almost identical to that described by Karel Shkorpil ancient harbor and second part - a deeper bay, located just south of the basin. Old descriptions of the Cape Shabla area mention that the reefs were once overlooked by an artificial construction, which refers to the Thracian facility precisely to the Limen category, the existence of which is confirmed in the Caron Limen toponym itself. According to Arian, "the land around the Port of Kari is called Karia." Looking at the vast and relatively low coastal terrace located west of the ancient port, much of which is occupied with the remains of the said vast settlement and its necropolises. This clarifies that Caria is not an abstract geographical concept, but a specific place name, representing the ancient name of the Thracian coastal settlement, and Caron Limen being the name of its port. The entire nose area of about 25 hectares is littered with archeological monuments. Although the coastline today is different from that of antiquity, the accidental finds, terrain crawls, excavations carried out in 1976 - 1979, and underwater surveys in 1962,1979 and 1980 undoubtedly confirmed the existence of this site in the Chronicles described as significantly antique. settlement. The antique fort, located on the very head, just south of the Shabla lighthouse, is well researched. The preserved part of the fort is 12 x 60 m in size. The western part of the northern fort wall was studied from the outside and face in 1978–79. It is almost 2 m thick; preserved altitude 1.80 m. Through the 1995-96 drilling, archaeological excavations revealed the route of the western fortress wall and partially explored the southwestern tower. The site has been declared a cultural monument by letter No 4267 / 23.12.1985 from the National Research Institute. A flooded settlement of the Bronze Age, an ancient necropolis, ancient remains of boats made only with wooden assemblies and a few medieval wrecks were fixed under water opposite the Shabla Tuzla.

The Antarctic Peninsula Peak is named after the ancient Caria.

===== Middle Ages and Modernity =====
In the early Middle Ages, the area devastated by the barbarian invasions was populated by the Bulgarians and Slavs, and since the founding of the Bulgarian state was part of it. After the failure of Vladislav Varnenchik's crusade against the Turks in 1444, Ottoman domination was fully established there. During the Middle Ages, ivory ships passed by the shores of Shabla. Many of them are swallowed up by the waves, and to this day it happens that the greatest lucky ones find elephant tusks thrown from the water. The legend tells of the British ship "Black Prince" sunk by Shabla during the Crimean War, loaded with gold for the army.

The origin of the present name of the settlement, according to the version, is related to the Proto-Bulgarian word "saber" (scoop). In the middle of the 19th century Shabla is the largest Bulgarian village in the region and its mayor is Bulgarian. Residents actively participate in the struggle for an independent Bulgarian church, education and national freedom. In the personal notebook of Hristo Botev when forming his company was recorded Nikola Alexov from Shabla.

After the liberation from Ottoman rule, Shabla became the center of the municipality. Pride for her is the gold medal won by Dimitar Anastasov, who won the First Bulgarian Agricultural and Industrial Exhibition in Plovdiv in 1892. In 1900, a rural revolt broke out in Durankulak and Shabla against the introduction of new taxes (a dozen). From August 1913 to September 1916 and from November 1919 to September 1940, the area was occupied by Romania. After the liberation on September 7, 1940, hundreds of families deported from the Romanian authorities from the native Bulgarian population of Northern Dobrudzha settled here.

Around the Shabla lighthouse was the only oil field in Bulgaria, hot mineral water with high sulfur content is flowing from many drilling operations today.

Until 1964 Shabla was a village, until 1969 a town of urban type, on 27.08.1969 was proclaimed a city.

== Honour ==
Shabla Knoll on Livingston Island in the South Shetland Islands, Antarctica is named after Shabla.

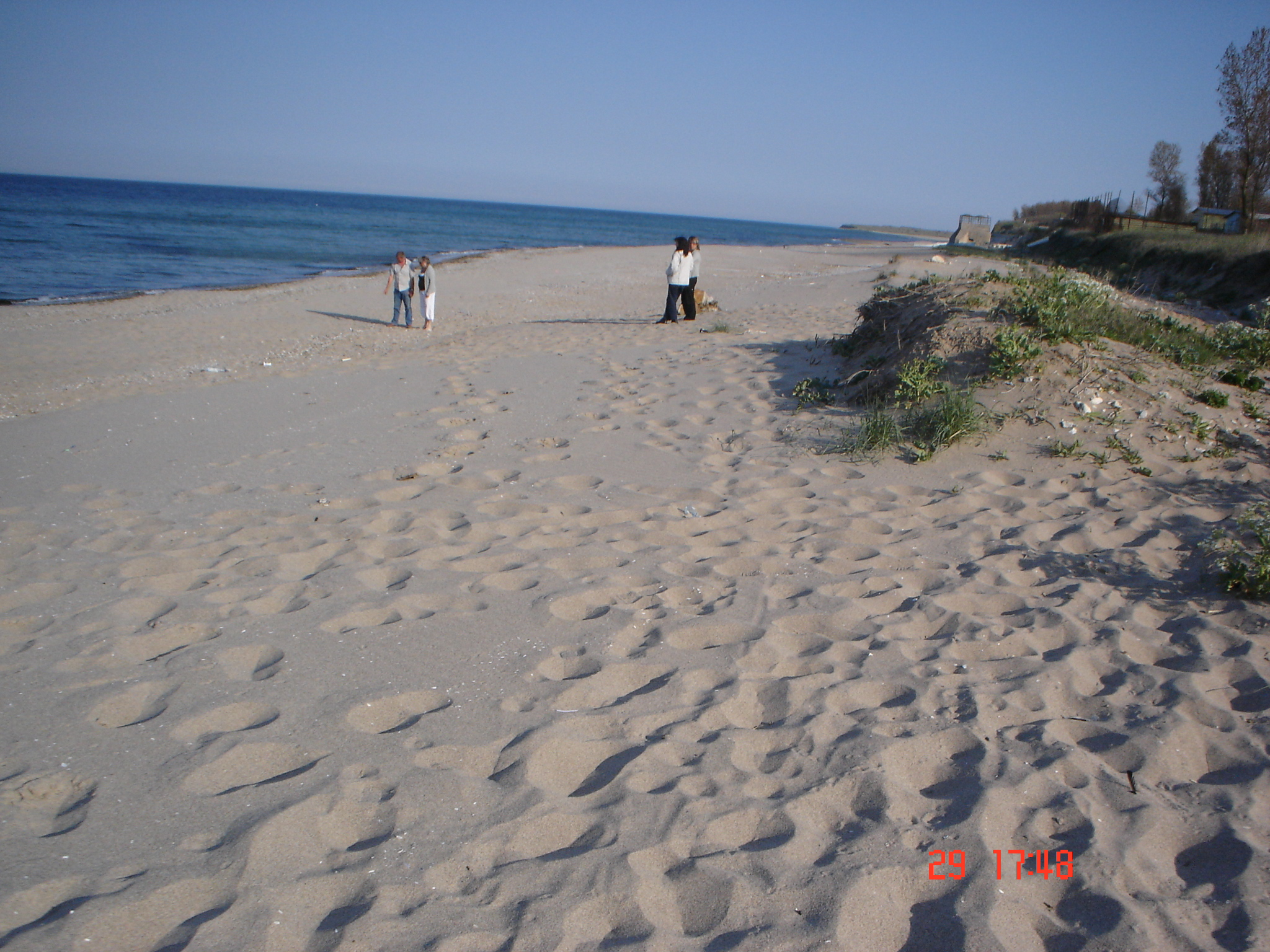
Shabla beach
