= Krapets, Dobrich Province =

Krapets Крапец Carapcea
- Village
- Location in Bulgaria
- Coordinates: 43.626°N 28.567°E
- Country: Bulgaria
- Province: Dobrich Province
- Municipality: Shabla

Population (2013)
  - Total: 290
- Time zone: UTC+2 (EET)
  - Summer (DST): UTC+3 (EEST)

Krapets (Bulgarian: Крапец; Romanian: Carapcea) is a coastal village in Shabla Municipality, Dobrich Province, northeastern Bulgaria.

== History ==
Between 1913 and 1940 the village formed part of Southern Dobruja, which was ceded to Romania under the Treaty of Bucharest and administered as part of plasa Balcic in Caliacra County. During this period it was known by its Romanian name, Carapcea. The territory was returned to Bulgaria under the Treaty of Craiova in 1940.

Krapets Glacier on Danco Coast, Antarctica is named after the village.
