= Baltic offensive =

1944 military conflicts in Baltic states during WW II

Baltic offensive (1944) (Baltic strategic offensive)
- Part of the Eastern Front of World War II
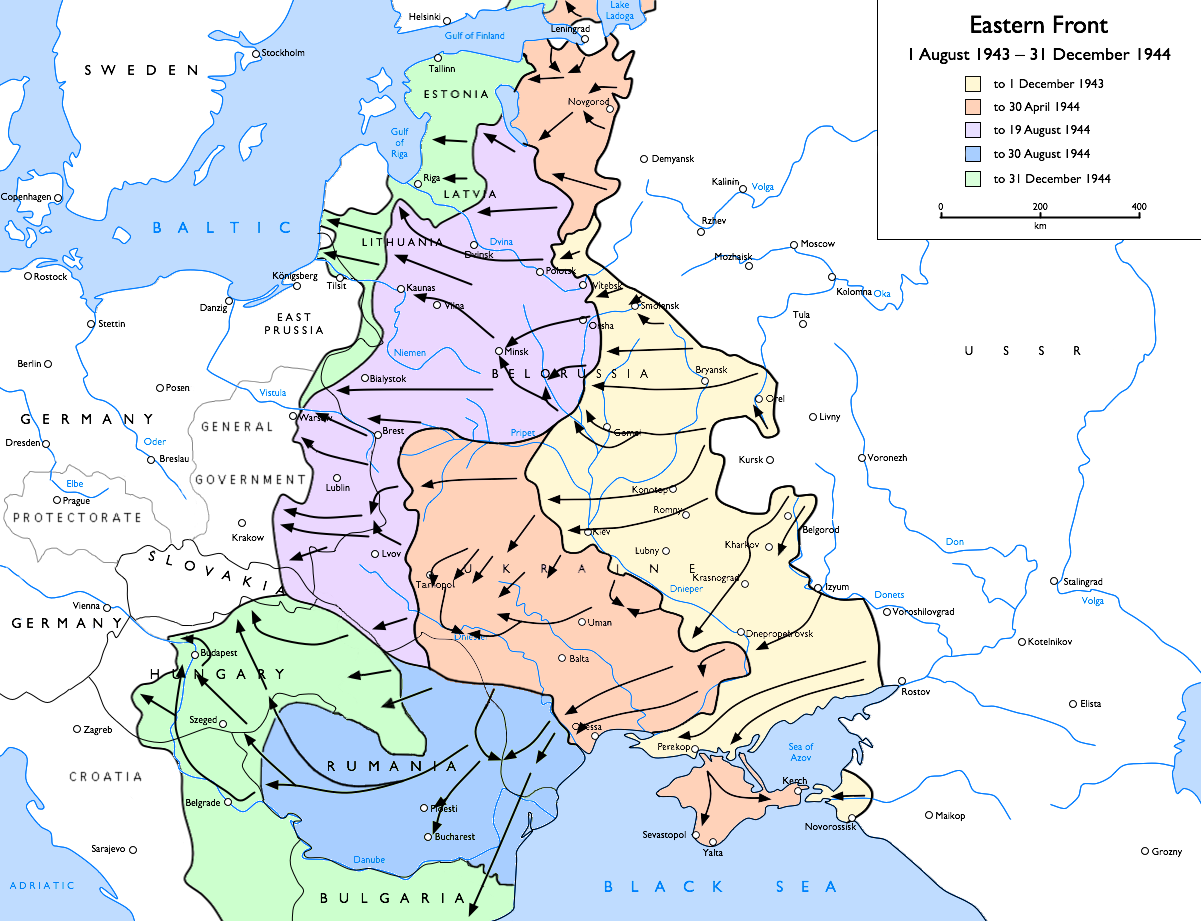
- Soviet advances on the Eastern Front, 1 August 1943 – 31 December 1944
Date	14 September – 24 November 1944
Location	Baltic States, East Prussia, Poland
Result	Soviet victory
Territorial changes	Formation of the Courland Pocket

Belligerents
Soviet Union	Germany

Commanders and leaders
(Soviet Union) Ivan Bagramyan (Soviet Union) Leonid Govorov	(Nazi Germany) Walter Model (Nazi Germany) Johannes Freißner

Strength
1,546,400 troops 17,500 artillery pieces 3,080 tanks and assault guns 2,640 aircraft	342,742 troops unknown artillery pieces 262 tanks; 299 assault guns 321 aircraft

Casualties and losses
61,468 KIA or MIA; 218,622 WIA or sick 522 tanks 779 aircraft	October only: 30,834 KIA, WIA and MIA

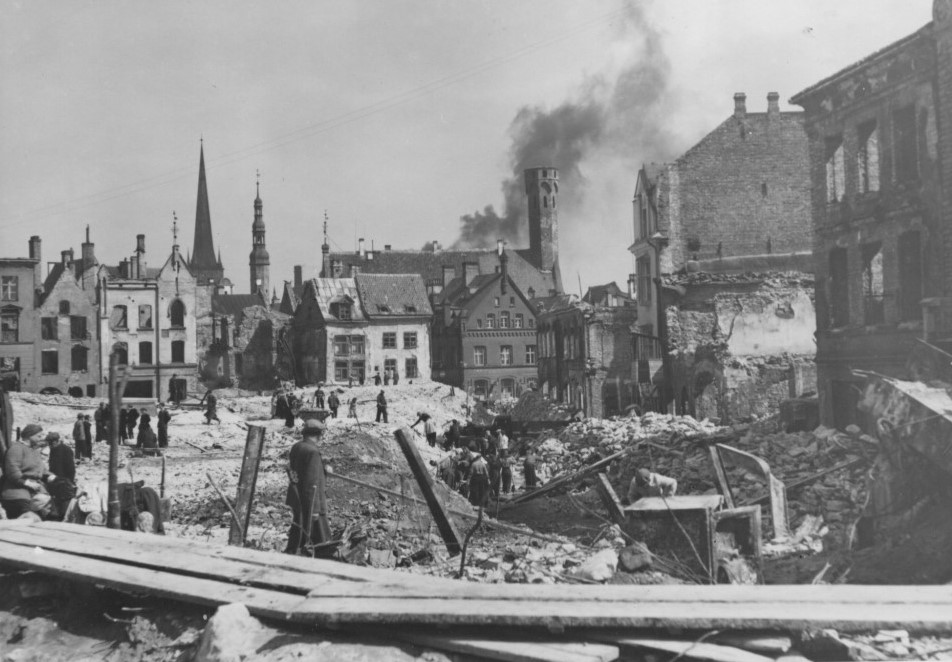
The medieval Old Town and Town Hall of German-occupied Tallinn, Estonia in ruins after Soviet aerial bombing attacks (1944).

The Baltic offensive, also known as the Baltic strategic offensive, was the military campaign between the northern Fronts of the Red Army and the German Army Group North in the Baltic States during the autumn of 1944. The result of the series of battles was the isolation and encirclement of the Army Group North in the Courland Pocket and Soviet re-occupation of the Baltic States. In Soviet propaganda, this offensive was listed as one of Stalin's ten blows.

== Background ==
By early 1944, the Wehrmacht was pushed back along its entire frontline in the east. In February 1944, it retreated from the approaches to Leningrad to the prepared section of the Panther Line at the border of Estonia. In June and July, Army Group Centre was thrown back from the Byelorussian SSR into Poland by Operation Bagration. This created the opportunity for the Red Army to attack towards the Baltic Sea, thereby severing the land connection between the German Army Groups in the east.

By 5 July, the Šiauliai offensive commenced, as a follow-up from Operation Bagration. The Soviet 43rd, 51st, and 2nd Guards Armies attacked towards Riga on the Baltic coast with 3rd Guards Mechanized Corps in the van. By 31 July, the coast on the Gulf of Riga had been reached; 6th Guards Army covered Riga and the extended flank of the penetration towards the north.

The German reaction was rapid, and initially successful. A counterattack, code-named Operation Doppelkopf, was conducted on 16 August by XXXX and XXXIX Panzer Corps under the command of Third Panzer Army, Army Group Centre. Acting in coordination with armored formations from Army Group North, they initially cut off the Soviet troops on the coast, and re-established a tenuous 30-kilometer-wide corridor connecting Army Groups Centre and North. The main objective of the attack was to retake the key road junction of Šiauliai (German: Schaulen), but the German tanks ran head-on into an in-depth defense by the 1st Baltic Front, and by 20 August the German advance had stalled with heavy losses. A follow-up attack, code-named Operation Cäsar and launched on 16 September, failed in the same manner. After a brief period of respite, Stavka issued orders for the Baltic strategic offensive, which lasted from 14 September to 24 November.

== Battles ==
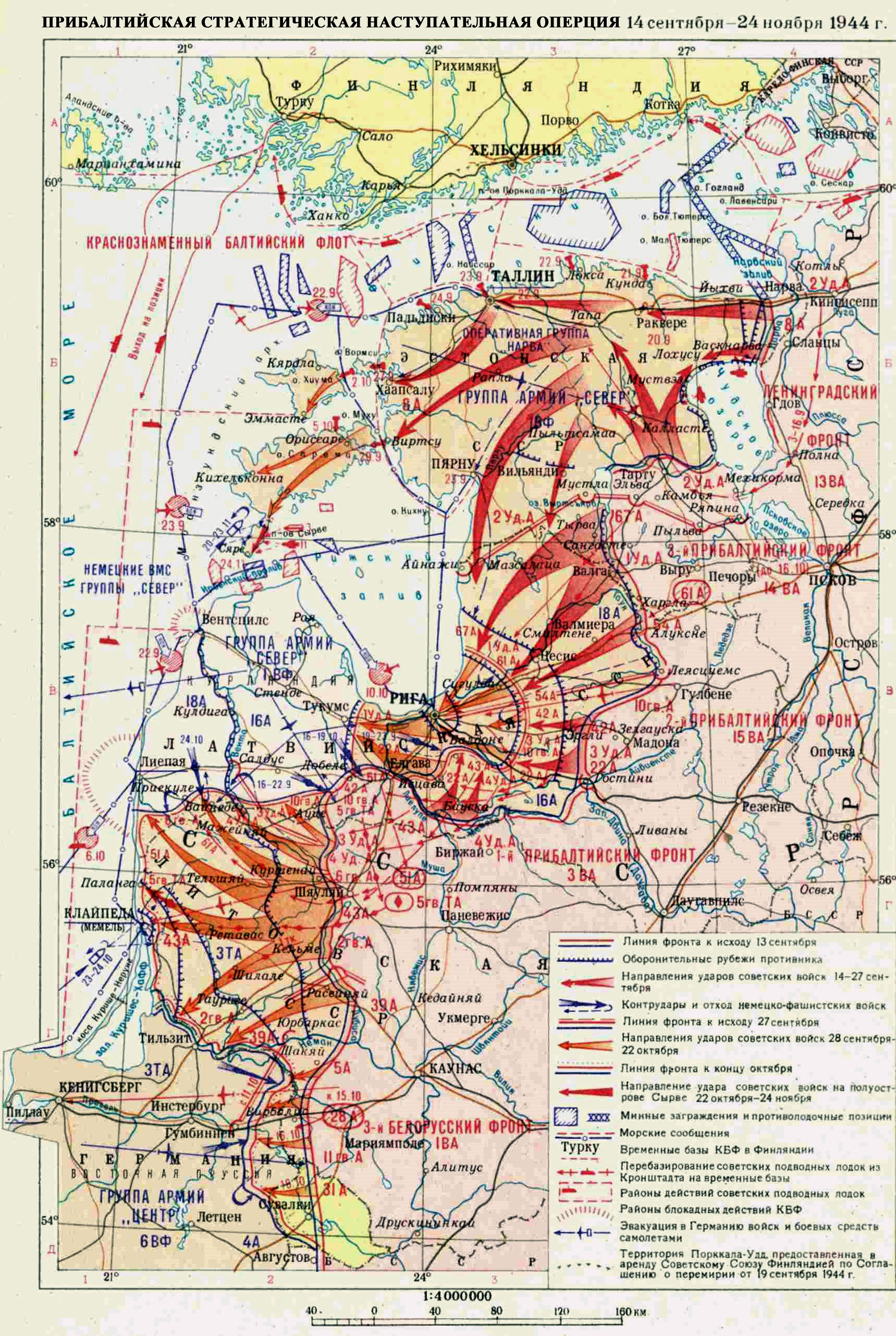
Baltic offensive

In common with other Soviet strategic offensives, the Baltic offensive covers a number of operational-level operations and individual Front offensive operations:

- The Riga offensive (Russian: Рижская наступательная операция) (14 September–24 October 1944) was carried out by the 3rd and 2nd Baltic Fronts and cleared the eastern coast of the Gulf of Riga.
- The Tallinn offensive (Russian: Таллинская наступательная операция) (17–26 September 1944) was carried out by the Leningrad Front to drive German forces from mainland Estonia.
- The Moonsund Landing Operation (Russian: Моонзундская десантная операция) (27 September–24 November 1944) was the amphibious landing on the Estonian islands of Hiiumaa, Saaremaa and Muhu, which block access to the Gulf of Riga. According to Soviet data, Germany lost 7,000 dead soldiers and 700 captured.
- The Memel offensive (Russian: Мемельская операция) (5–22 October 1944) was an attack by the 1st Baltic Front aimed at severing the connection between the German Army Groups Centre and North.

From the German defensive perspective, the period included the following operations:

- Operation Cäsar, aimed at the restoration of contact between Army Groups Centre and North 16–21 September 1944;
- Operation Aster aimed at the evacuation of Army Group North from mainland Estonia 17–26 September 1944;
- The siege of Memel 5–27 October 1944;
- Formation of the Courland Pocket 15–22 October 1944.

== Aftermath ==
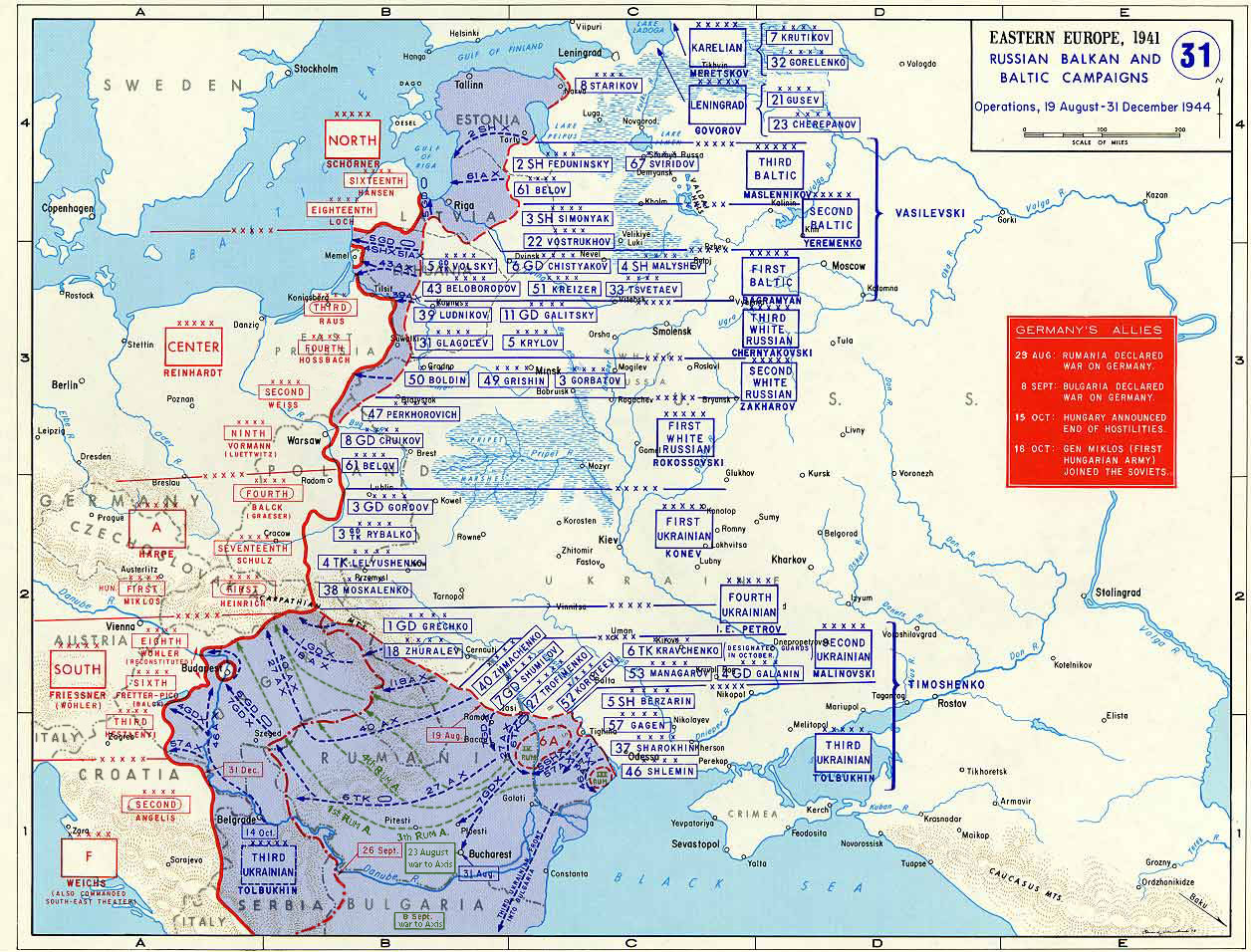
Soviet Operations, 19 August-31 December 1944

=== Soviet victory ===
The Baltic offensive operation resulted in the expulsion of German forces from Estonia and Lithuania. The Soviet fronts involved in the battle lost a total of ca. 280,000 men to all causes (killed, missing, wounded, sick).

Communication lines between Army Group North and Army Group Centre were permanently severed, and the former was relegated to an occupied Baltic seashore area in Latvia. On 25 January, Adolf Hitler renamed Army Group North to Army Group Courland implicitly recognising that there was no possibility of restoring a new land corridor between Courland and East Prussia. The Red Army commenced the encirclement and reduction of the Courland Pocket which retained a possibility of being a major threat, but were able to focus on operations on its northern flank that were now aiming at East Prussia. Operations by the Red Army against the Courland Pocket continued until the surrender of the Army Group Courland on 9 May 1945, when close to 200,000 Germans were taken prisoner there.

The German command released thousands of native conscripts from military service. However the Soviet command began conscripting Baltic natives as areas were brought under Soviet control. While some ended up serving on both sides, many partisans hid in the woods to avoid conscription. (See also Forest Brothers)

112 Hero of the Soviet Union awards were given out during the offensive, of which three were given soldier's second award.

=== Reoccupation of the Baltic states ===
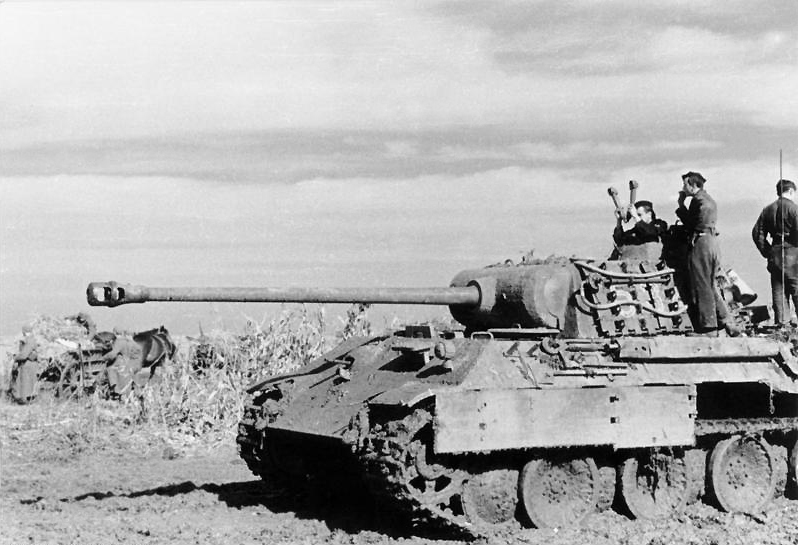
Panther on the Eastern Front, 1944.

Soviet rule of the Baltic states was re-established by force, and sovietisation followed, which was mostly carried out in 1944–1950. The forced collectivisation of agriculture began in 1947, and was completed after the mass deportation of civilians in March 1949. All private farms were confiscated, and farmers were made to join the collective farms. An armed resistance movement named 'Forest Brothers' was active until the mass deportations. Tens of thousands participated or supported the movement; thousands were killed. The Soviet authorities fighting the Forest Brothers also suffered hundreds of deaths. Among those killed on both sides were innocent civilians. Besides the armed resistance of the Forest Brothers, a number of underground nationalist schoolchildren groups were active. Most of their members were sentenced to long terms of imprisonment. The punitive actions decreased rapidly after Joseph Stalin's death in 1953; from 1956 to 1958, a large part of the deportees and political prisoners were allowed to return to their homelands. Political arrests and numerous other kinds of crimes against humanity were committed all through the occupation period until the late 1980s. Although the armed resistance was defeated, the populations remained anti-Soviet. This helped the Baltic citizens to organise a new resistance movement in the late 1980s and then rapidly develop a modern society after the dissolution of the Soviet Union in 1991.

== Formations and units involved ==
=== Soviet ===
- 1st Baltic Front commanded by General Ivan Bagramyan
  - 5th Guards Tank Army commanded by General Vasily Volsky
  - 6th Guards Army commanded by Lieutenant-General Ivan Chistyakov
  - 4th Shock Army commanded by Lieutenant-General Pyotr Malyshev
  - 43rd Army commanded by Lieutenant-General Afanasy Beloborodov
  - 51st Army commanded by Lieutenant-General Yakov Kreizer
  - 33rd Army commanded by Lieutenant-General Vyacheslav Tsvetayev
  - 3rd Air Army
- 2nd Baltic Front commanded by Army-General Andrey Yeryomenko
  - 3rd Shock Army commanded by Lieutenant-General Nikolai Simoniak
  - 22nd Army commanded by Lieutenant-General Vladimir Vostrukhov
- 3rd Baltic Front commanded by Colonel-General I.I. Maslennikov
- 3rd Belorussian Front (parts) commanded by Army General Ivan Chernyakhovsky
  - 2nd Shock Army commanded first by Lieutenant-General Porfiry Chanchibadze, then by Lieutenant-General Ivan Fedyuninsky
  - 3rd Guards Mechanized Corps commanded by Lieutenant-General Viktor Obukhov
  - 61st Army commanded by Lieutenant-General Pavel Belov
  - 67th Army commanded by Lieutenant-General Vladimir Sviridov
- Leningrad Front commanded by Marshal L.A. Govorov (parts)
  - 8th Army commanded by Lieutenant-General Filipp Starikov

=== German ===
- Army Group North commanded by Colonel-General Ferdinand Schörner
  - Army detachment "Narwa" commanded by Infantry General Grasser
  - Eighteenth Army commanded by Infantry-General Loch
  - Sixteenth Army commanded by Artillery-General Hansen
  - 502nd Heavy Panzer Battalion
- Army Group Centre commanded by Colonel-General Reinhardt
  - Third Panzer Army commanded by Colonel-General Erhard Raus
    - XXXX Panzer Corps
    - XXXIX Panzer Corps
      - Panzer Grenadier Division Grossdeutschland
      - 4th Panzer Division
      - 5th Panzer Division
      - 17th Panzer Division

== Notes and references ==
- Anderson, D, et al. The Eastern Front, Zenith Imprint (2001), ISBN 0-7603-0923-X
- Muriyev, D. Preparations, Conduct of 1944 Baltic Operation Described, Military History Journal (USSR Report, Military affairs), 1984-9
- Stilwell, A. and Hastings, M. The Second World War: A World in Flames, Osprey (2004), ISBN 1-84176-830-8
- Проэктор, Д. M. "Агрессия и катастрофа. Высшее военное руководство фашистской Германии во второй мировой войне", Глава восьмая. "Катастрофа", М.: Наука, 1972.
