= Operation Doppelkopf =

1944 German military operation

- Part of Eastern Front of World War II
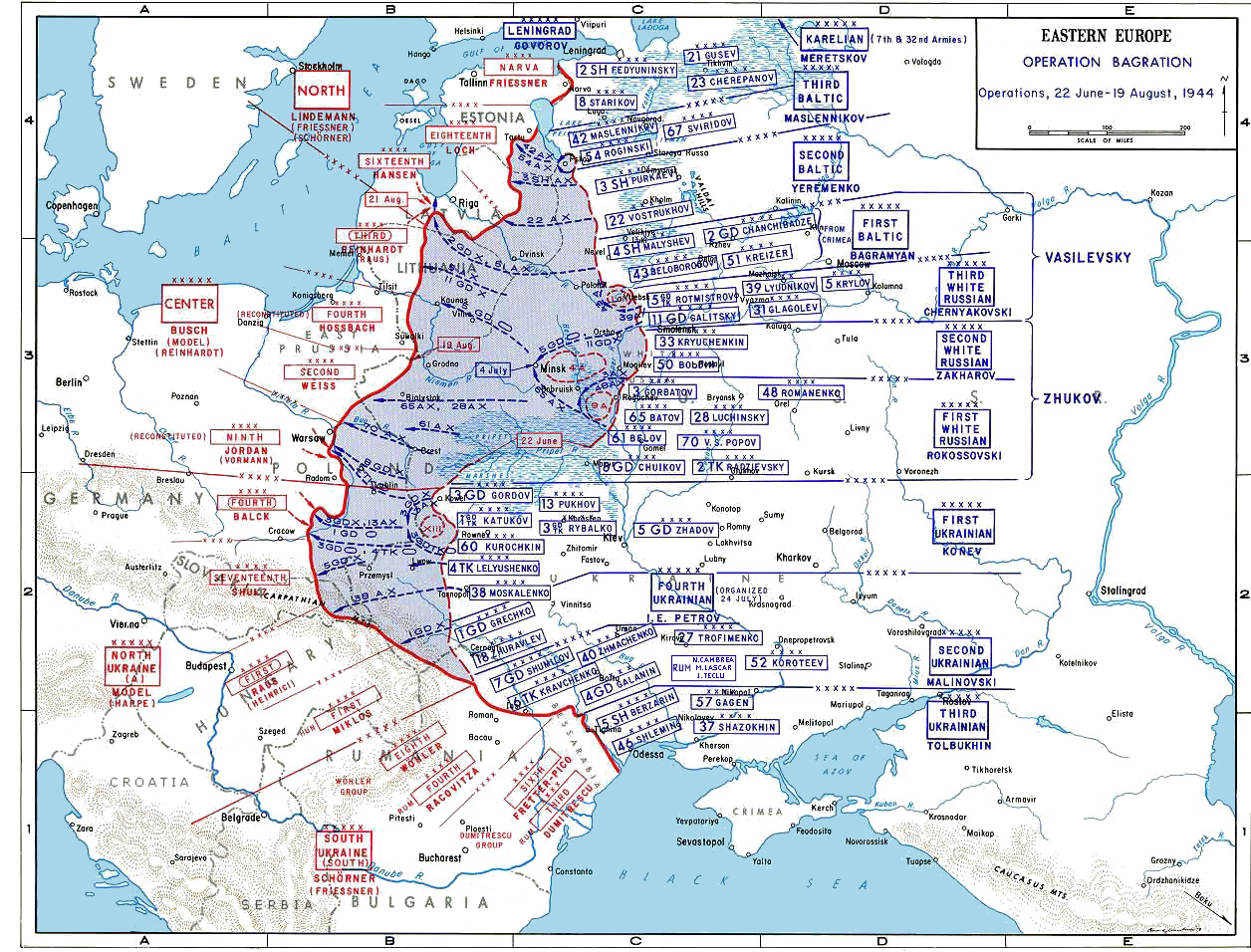
- Eastern Front, June–August 1944. The attack at the connection between Army Groups Centre (Third Panzer Army) and North (Sixteenth Army) west of Riga is marked.
Date	16 August 1944 – 27 August 1944
Location	Western Latvia 55°50′N 23°10′E
Result	Inconclusive

Belligerents
Germany	Soviet Union

Commanders and leaders
(Nazi Germany) Georg-Hans Reinhardt (Army Group Centre) (Nazi Germany) Erhard Raus (Third Panzer Army)	(Soviet Union) Ivan Chernyakhovsky (3rd Belorussian Front) (Soviet Union) Hovhannes Bagramyan (1st Baltic Front)

Operation Doppelkopf (German: Unternehmen Doppelkopf) and the following Operation Cäsar were German counter-offensives on the Eastern Front in the late summer of 1944 in the aftermath of the major Soviet advance in Operation Bagration with the aim of restoring a coherent front between Army Group North and Army Group Centre. The operation's codename was a reference to the German card game Doppelkopf.

== Strategic situation ==
By the end of July 1944, Soviet mechanised forces had reached the Gulf of Riga following their headlong advance in the Kaunas and Šiauliai offensives, part of the third and final 'pursuit' phase of the strategic offensive Operation Bagration. The Soviet 2nd Guards Army had exploited a breach between the German 16th Army of Army Group North and the neighbouring 3rd Panzer Army of Army Group Centre, and severed the connection between them. German counter-attacks failed to restore it, and significant elements of the German armed forces were left isolated.

The Oberkommando des Heeres made immediate plans for an offensive to restore the connection between the two Army Groups.

== Planning ==
A number of armoured formations were assembled under Army Group Centre in Courland with orders to attack towards Jelgava (German: Mitau), cutting off the Soviet spearheads. The XXXX Panzer Corps, with the 7th and 14th Panzer Divisions, the Grossdeutschland Division and the 1st Infantry Division, was assembled at Liepāja / Libau, while the XXXIX Panzer Corps was assembled at Tauroggen.

== Deployments ==
=== Wehrmacht ===
- Army Group Centre (Colonel-General Georg-Hans Reinhardt) (from 16 August)
  - Third Panzer Army (Gen. Erhard Raus) (from 16 August)
    - XL Panzer Corps (Gen. Otto von Knobelsdorff)
    - XXXIX Panzer Corps (Gen. Dietrich von Saucken)

=== Red Army ===
- Elements of 3rd Belorussian Front (Gen. Ivan Chernyakhovsky)
- Elements of 1st Baltic Front (Gen. Hovhannes Bagramyan)

== The offensive ==
The operation commenced with an attack by the 7th Panzer Division on 15 August towards Kelmė. The main offensive began the following day, but there was strong resistance against the XXXX Panzer Corps from ten Soviet infantry divisions supported by three artillery divisions and anti-tank units.

Von Saucken's XXXIX Panzer Corps opened operations on 18 August. Its left flank, an ad hoc formation under Hyacinth Graf Strachwitz, was preceded by a heavy artillery bombardment from the cruiser Prinz Eugen; forces inside the pocket attacked to link up with Strachwitz's force. Strachwitz reached 16th Army at Tukums by midday.

By 27 August, the corridor between 3rd Panzer Army and 16th Army had been enlarged to 18 miles in width, though the latter had come under renewed pressure from a fresh Soviet offensive against Riga. The operation had also failed in its more ambitious objectives of retaking Šiauliai or of cutting off the 6th Guards Army threatening Riga.

== Operation Cäsar ==
A second German 'spoiling' attack, was planned to destroy Bagramyan's forces in the salient below Riga and push the front out to a straight line between the Segewold position and Šiauliai. The main strike force was the reorganised XXXIX Panzer Corps, Third Panzer Army having been placed under the temporary overall control of Army Group North. The attack began on 16 September, in response to the Soviet Riga Offensive Operation, but by 19 September it had ground to a halt in the face of intense Soviet resistance after having penetrated only a few miles. The German forces then assumed a defensive configuration.

== Aftermath ==
The Red Army attacked again on 5 October, in the Memel Offensive Operation. Five days later, they reached the Baltic Sea and finally cut off Army Group North in what eventually became the Courland Pocket. The German XXVIII Corps was isolated from the remainder of 3rd Panzer Army in a bridgehead at Memel.

== See also ==
- Baltic Offensive, the Soviet strategic offensive against Army Group North
- Battle of Tannenberg Line, the parallel defensive battles of Army Group North
