= East Prussian offensive =

1945 Soviet offensive on the Eastern Front in World War II

- Part of the Eastern Front of World War II
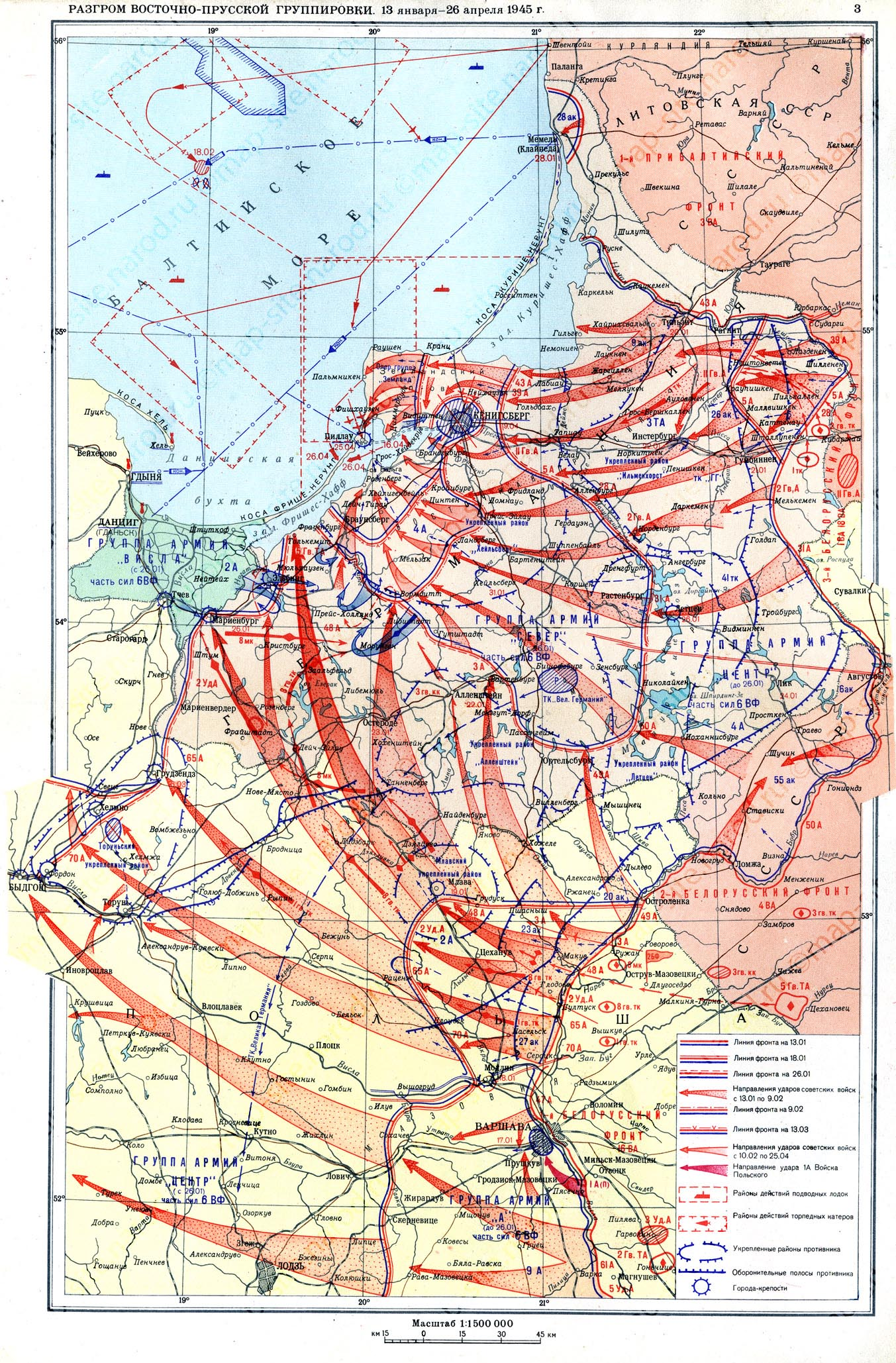
- Soviet offensive in East Prussia
Date	13 January – 25 April 1945
Location	East Prussia, Germany
Result	Soviet victory
Territorial changes	Most of East Prussia is annexed by Poland and the Soviet Union annexes Königsberg, Memel and their surrounding areas.

Belligerents
Soviet Union	Germany

Commanders and leaders
Konstantin Rokossovsky; Aleksandr Vasilevsky; Ivan Bagramyan; Ivan Isakov	Georg-Hans Reinhardt; Lothar Rendulic; Friedrich Hossbach; Friedrich-Wilhelm Müller; Erhard Raus; Walter Weiß; Dietrich von Saucken

Units involved
Red Army: 2nd Belorussian Front; 3rd Belorussian Front; 43rd Army; 1st Baltic Front; (Soviet Union) Soviet Navy: Baltic Fleet	(Nazi Germany) Wehrmacht: Army Group Centre (renamed the Army Group North); 3rd Panzer Army; 4th Army; 2nd Army; Volkssturm IX Settembre Battalion

Strength
1,669,100 men, 3,000 tanks 25,000 guns and 3,000 aircraft	580,000 men: 200,000 Volkssturm troopers 700 tanks 8,200 guns and 700 aircraft

Casualties and losses
126,464 dead or missing 458,314 wounded and sick	Unknown killed or wounded 220,000 captured

The East Prussian offensive was a strategic offensive by the Soviet Red Army against the German Wehrmacht on the Eastern Front of World War II. It lasted from 13 January to 25 April 1945, though some German units did not surrender until the country did on 9 May. The Battle of Königsberg was a major part of the offensive, which ended in victory for the Red Army.

The East Prussian offensive is known to German historians as the second East Prussian offensive. The first East Prussian offensive (also known as the Gumbinnen Operation), took place from 16 to 27 October 1944, and was carried out by the 3rd Belorussian Front under General I.D. Chernyakhovsky as part of the Memel offensive of the 1st Baltic Front. The Soviet forces took heavy casualties while penetrating 30–60 km (19–37 mi) into the east-northern part of Poland, and the offensive was postponed until greater reserves could be gathered.

== The offensive ==
The main thrust of the offensive was to be conducted by the 3rd Belorussian Front under Ivan Chernyakhovsky. His forces were tasked with driving westwards towards Königsberg, against the defensive positions of the 3rd Panzer Army and 4th Army, the northern armies of Generaloberst Georg-Hans Reinhardt's Army Group Centre.

From the north, on Chernyakhovsky's right flank, General Hovhannes Bagramyan's 1st Baltic Front would attack the positions of the 3rd Panzer Army on the Neman, as well as crushing its small bridgehead at Memel. Chernyakhovsky's left flank would be supported by the 2nd Belorussian Front of Marshal Konstantin Rokossovsky, which was initially ordered to push north-west to the Vistula, through the lines of the 2nd Army, thereby sealing off the whole of East Prussia.

=== Opening of the offensive ===
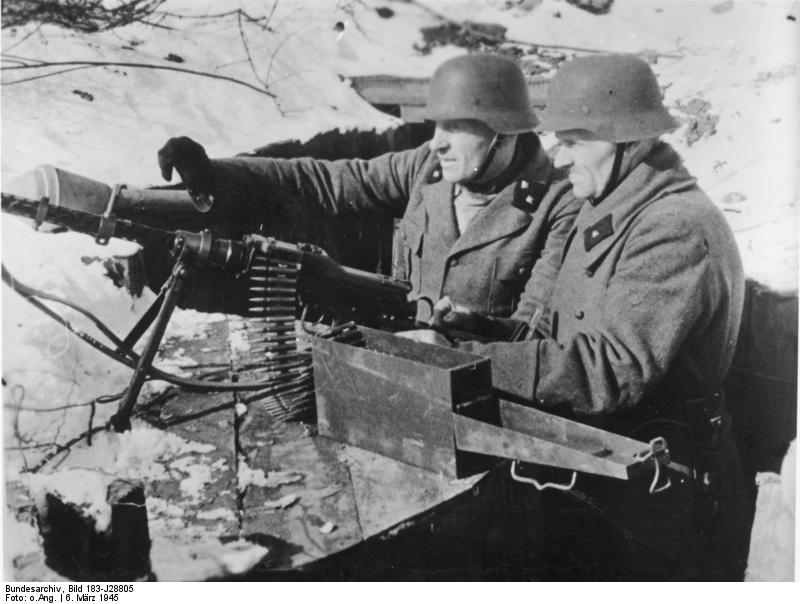
Volkssturm militiamen in Königsberg during the offensive

The Soviet offensive began on 13 January with a heavy preparatory bombardment. At first, the Red Army made disappointing progress; the 3rd Belorussian Front gained just 1.5 km on the first day. Over the next five days, the Soviets managed to advance only a further 20 km, at the cost of very high casualties. Eventually, after almost two weeks of severe fighting, the Red Army began making steady progress, although again, this came at the price of high losses; the defenders having the advantage of substantial fortifications in the Insterburg Gap east of Königsberg, and around Heilsberg. Over the next few days, the 3rd Panzer Army of Generaloberst Erhard Raus was largely destroyed or withdrew into Königsberg, while General der Infanterie Friedrich Hossbach's 4th Army began to find itself outflanked.

Against fierce resistance, Rokossovsky attacked across the Narew on 14 January; on 20 January, he received orders to swing the axis of his advance northward toward Elbing. This sudden change of direction caught Reinhardt and Hossbach by surprise; on Rokossovsky's right flank, the 3rd Guards Cavalry Corps captured the major town of Allenstein on 22 January, threatening the rear of Hossbach's formation. On 24 January, Rokossovsky's leading tank units had reached the shore of the Vistula Lagoon, severing land communications with the rest of German armed forces for the entire 4th Army along with several divisions of the 2nd Army which were now trapped in a pocket centered on East Prussia. On the same day, Hossbach began to pull his units back from the fortified town of Lötzen—a center of the East Prussian defence system—and through a series of forced marches attempted to break out westward.

In the meantime, Chernyakhovsky had succeeded in rolling up the defences from the East, pushing the remnants of the 3rd Panzer Army into Königsberg and Samland. On 28 January, Bagramyan's forces captured Memel; the remnants of the three divisions defending the town were evacuated and redeployed in Samland to reinforce the defence there.

=== The siege of Königsberg and the Heiligenbeil pocket ===
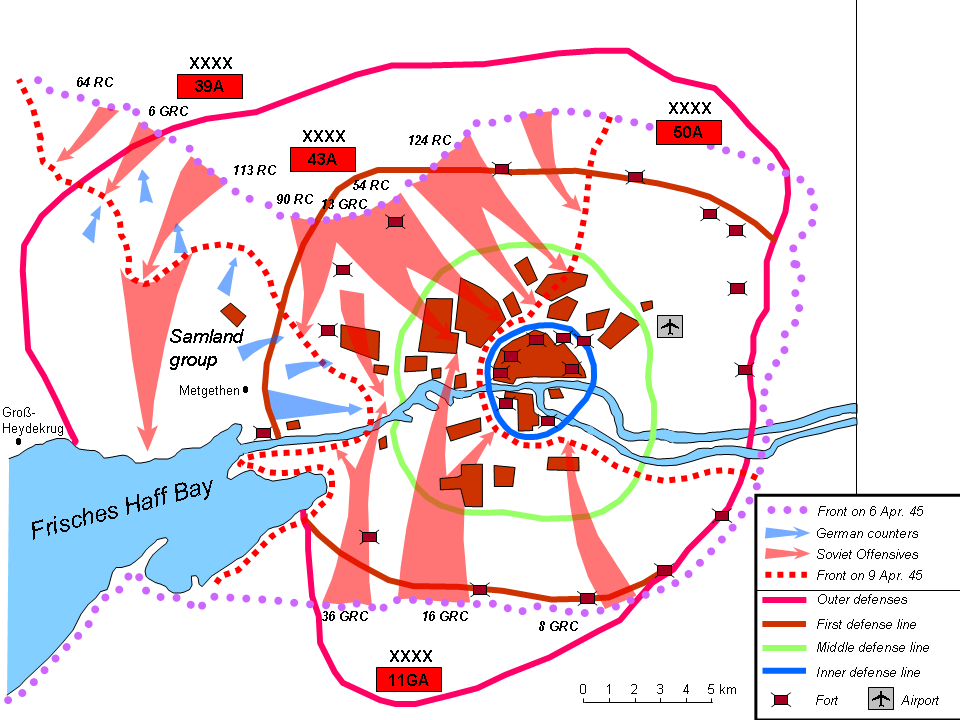
Soviet assault on Königsberg from 6–9 April 1945.

With the remnants of Army Group Centre effectively contained, Soviet forces could concentrate on reducing the German forces in Pomerania and eliminating any possible threat to the northern flank of their eventual advance on Berlin. Reinhardt and Hossbach—who had attempted to break out of East Prussia and save their troops—were relieved of command, and the Army Group (redesignated Army Group North) was placed under the command of Generaloberst Lothar Rendulic. Reinhardt gave up his command with the words "There is nothing more to say". Raus and the staff of the destroyed 3rd Panzer Army were assigned to a new formation. The defending forces, in the meantime, were besieged in three pockets by Chernyakhovsky's armies:

- Some 15 divisions of the 4th Army had become encircled on the shore of the Vistula Lagoon in what became known as the Heiligenbeil Pocket. After bitter fighting, these units were finally overcome on 29 March.
- The remnants of 3rd Panzer Army—placed under 4th Army's command—became isolated in the siege of Königsberg. The city was finally taken by the Soviets—after massive casualties on both sides—on 9 April. After this point the remaining German forces around the Bight of Danzig were reorganised into Armee Ostpreußen under the overall command of Dietrich von Saucken.
- The third group of German forces—the XXVIII Army Corps or Armeeabteilung Samland under General der Infanterie Hans Gollnick—occupied the Samland Peninsula, where the port of Pillau was retained as the last effective evacuation point for the area. The last elements were cleared from Pillau on 25 April in the Samland offensive.

Even after this time, German forces continued to resist on the Vistula Spit, the long sandbar enclosing the Vistula Lagoon, until the end of the war.

== See also ==
- Evacuation of East Prussia
- Prussian Nights
- Strategic operations of the Red Army in World War II
