= Walther von Hünersdorff =

Nazi general (1898–1943)

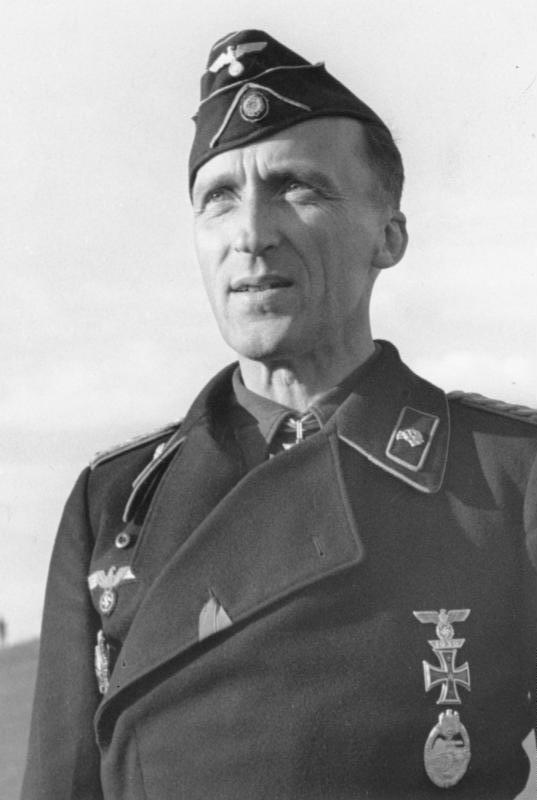
- Born: 28 November 1898; Cairo, Egypt
- Died: 17 July 1943 (aged 44); Kharkov, Reichskommissariat Ukraine
- Military career
- Allegiance: German Empire; Weimar Republic; Nazi Germany
- Branch: Army (Wehrmacht)
- Service years: 1915–1943
- Rank: Generalleutnant
- Commands: 6th Panzer Division
- Conflicts: World War I World War II: Battle of Kursk †
- Awards: Knight's Cross of the Iron Cross with Oak Leaves

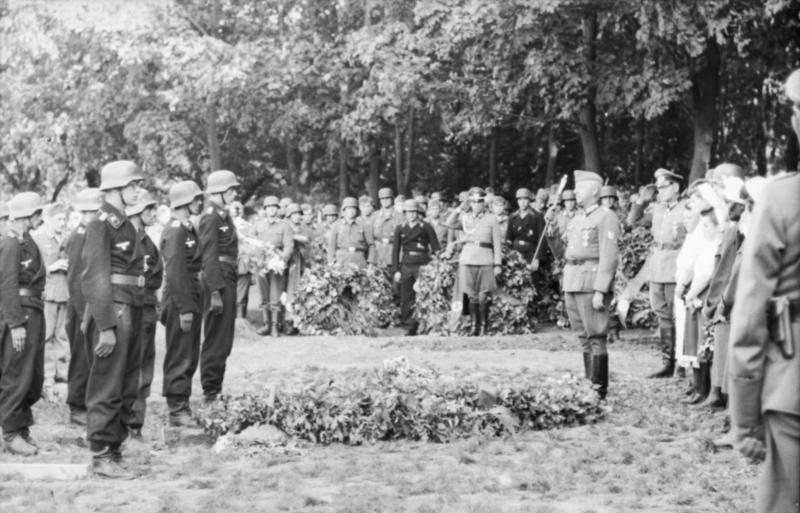
Burial of Hünersdorff

Walther von Hünersdorff (28 November 1898 – 17 July 1943) was a German general during World War II who commanded the 6th Panzer Division. He was a recipient of the Knight's Cross of the Iron Cross with Oak Leaves and was killed during the Battle of Kursk.

== Life ==
Walther von Hünersdorff was born in 1898 in Cairo. He entered the Imperial German Army in 1915 as a member of 4th Hussar Regiment and participated in World War I. In 1916, he became a First Lieutenant. After the war Hünersdorff stayed in the Reichswehr. When World War II broke out, Hünersdorff served on the staff of the newly raised 253rd Infantry Division. On 25 October 1939 Hünersdorff was transferred to the II Army Corps, led by Adolf Strauß. On 12 September 1940, Hünersdorff became the chief of staff of the XV Army Corps, led by Hermann Hoth. With the now renamed Panzergruppe 3 he participated in Operation Barbarossa. On 7 February 1943 Hünersdorff became commander of the 6th Panzer Division, being promoted to Generalmajor in May. His division participated in the Battle of Kursk. During the battle Hünersdorff and a number of his staff officers were attacked by a group of Heinkel He 111s in a friendly fire accident, wounding Hünersdorff. On the same day Hünersdorff was shot in the head by a Soviet sniper, being critically injured. He died in a hospital at Kharkov on 17 July 1943. Hünersdorff was posthumously promoted to Generalleutnant.

== Awards ==
- Clasp to the Iron Cross (1939) 2nd Class (14 May 1940) & 1st Class (27 May 1940)
- German Cross in Gold on 26 January 1942 as Oberst im Generalstab (in the General Staff) with Panzer-Gruppe 3
- Knight's Cross of the Iron Cross with Oak Leaves
  - Knight's Cross on 22 December 1942 as Oberst and commander of the Panzer-Regiment 11
  - 259th Oak Leaves on 14 July 1943 as Generalmajor and commander of the 6. Panzer-Division

Military offices
Preceded by Generalleutnant Erhard Raus	Commander of 6. Panzer Division; 7 February 1943 – 17 July 1943	Succeeded by Generalmajor Wilhelm Crisolli
