= Battle of Memel =

1945 battle on the Eastern Front of World War II

- Part of the Eastern Front of World War II
Date	5–22 October 1944 (main offensive); 28 January 1945 (end of siege)
Location	Memel, East Prussia (Klaipėda, Lithuania) 55°40′N 21°30′E
Result	Soviet victory
Territorial changes	The Soviet Union annexes Memel and returns it to the Lithuanian SSR

Belligerents
(Nazi Germany) Germany	Soviet Union

Commanders and leaders
Erhard Raus (Third Panzer Army); Hans Gollnick (XXVIII Corps)	Hovhannes Bagramyan (1st Baltic Front)

The Battle of Memel or the siege of Memel (German: Erste Kurlandschlacht) was a battle which took place on the Eastern Front during World War II. The battle began when the Red Army launched its Memel offensive operation (Russian: Мемельская наступательная операция) in late 1944. The offensive drove remaining German forces in the area that is now Lithuania and Latvia into a small bridgehead in Klaipėda (Memel) and its port, leading to a three-month siege of that position. The bridgehead was finally crushed as part of the subsequent Soviet East Prussian offensive in early 1945.

== Prelude ==
The Soviet Operation Bagration, the June–August 1944 offensive to liberate Soviet Byelorussia, had seen the German Army Group Centre nearly destroyed and driven from what is now Belarus, most of what is now Lithuania and much of Poland. During August and September of that year, a series of German counter-offensives – Operations Doppelkopf and Cäsar – succeeded in stalling the Soviet advance and maintaining the connection between the German Army Groups Centre and North; however, Stavka made preparations for an attack by the 1st Baltic Front against the positions of the 3rd Panzer Army and thence towards Memel, splitting the two Army Groups.

Soviet General Bagramyan planned to make his main attack in a 19 km sector to the west of Šiauliai. He concentrated up to half of his entire force in this area, using concealment techniques to avoid a corresponding build-up of German forces, and attempting to convince the German command that the main axis of attack would be towards Riga.

== Deployments ==
=== Wehrmacht ===
- Various units of the Kriegsmarine
- Northern wing of the 3rd Panzer Army (General Erhard Raus)
  - Remnants of the 551st Volksgrenadier Division
  - XXVIII Corps (General Hans Gollnick) The corps was encircled in Memel bridgehead.
    - Panzergrenadier Division Großdeutschland (2 regiments)
    - 7th Panzer Division (part)
    - 58th Infantry Division
  - XL Panzer Corps (General Sigfrid Henrici)
    - 5th Panzer Division
    - 548th Volksgrenadier Division

At the end of November Panzergrenadier Division Großdeutschland and 7th Panzer Division were withdrawn and replaced by the 95th Infantry Division.

=== Red Army ===
- 1st Baltic Front (General Hovhannes Bagramyan)
  - 5th Guards Tank Army (General Vasily Volsky)
  - 43rd Army (Lieutenant-General Afanasy Beloborodov)
  - 51st Army (Lieutenant-General Yakov Kreizer)
  - 4th Shock Army (Lieutenant-General Pyotr Malyshev)
  - 6th Guards Army (Lieutenant-General Ivan Chistyakov)
- 3rd Belorussian Front
  - 39th Army (Lieutenant-General Ivan Lyudnikov)

== Offensive ==
On 5 October, Bagramyan opened the offensive against Raus's 3rd Panzer Army on a sixty-mile front, concentrating his breakthrough force against the relatively weak 551st Grenadier Division. The latter collapsed on the first day, and a 16 km (10 mile) penetration was achieved; Bagramyan then committed Volsky's 5th Guards Tank Army to the breach, aiming for the coast to the north of Memel. There was a general collapse of the Third Panzer Army's positions by 7 October, and a penetration further south by Afanasy Beloborodov's 43rd Army. Within two days, it had reached the coast south of Memel, while Volsky had encircled the town from the north. In the south, the northern flank of Chernyakhovsky's 3rd Belorussian Front was advancing on Tilsit. Third Panzer Army's headquarters were overrun by the 5th Guards Tank Army, and Raus and his staff had to fight their way into Memel.

The neighbouring Army Group commander, Ferdinand Schoerner, signalled on 9 October that he would mount an attack to relieve Memel if troops could be freed up by evacuating Riga. A decision on this matter was delayed, but the Kriegsmarine managed to withdraw much of the garrison and some civilians from the port in the meantime. The German XXVIII Corps under Gollnick held a defensive line around the town itself.

The success of the offensive in the northern sector encouraged the Soviet command to authorise the 3rd Belorussian Front to attempt to break through into the main area of East Prussia. This offensive, the Gumbinnen Operation, ran into extremely strong German resistance and was halted within a few days.

== Siege ==
The stalling of the Gumbinnen Operation meant that Soviet forces (mainly from the 43rd Army) settled down to a blockade of the German troops that had withdrawn into Memel. The German force, largely made up of elements from the Großdeutschland and 58th Infantry Divisions and the 7th Panzer Division, was aided by heavily fortified tactical defences, artillery fire from the German Task Force Thiele, centered around the heavy cruisers Prinz Eugen and Lützow, and a tenuous connection with the remainder of East Prussia over the Curonian Spit.

The blockade, and defence, was maintained through November, December and much of January, during which period the remaining civilians who had fled into the town, and military wounded, were evacuated by sea. During this time, the Großdeutschland and 7th Panzer Divisions were withdrawn, having suffered heavy losses, and were replaced by the 95th Infantry Division, which arrived by sea.

The town was finally abandoned on 27 January 1945. The success of the Soviet East Prussian offensive to the south made the position of the bridgehead untenable, and it was decided to withdraw the XXVIII Corps from the town into Samland to assist in the defence there; the remaining troops of the 95th and 58th Infantry Divisions were evacuated to the Curonian Spit, where the 58th Division acted as a rearguard for the withdrawal. The last organized German units left at 4am on 28 January, Soviet units taking possession of the harbour a few hours later.

== Aftermath ==
Memel, which had been part of Lithuania only between 1923 and 1939 prior to being reincorporated into Germany, was transferred to the Lithuanian SSR under the Soviet administration. In 1947 it was formally changed to its Lithuanian name, Klaipėda.

== See also ==
- Operation Hannibal, the evacuation effort by the Kriegsmarine beginning January 1945
- East Prussian Operation, Soviet offensive that finally eliminated the Memel pocket
- Courland Pocket
