= Ivan Bagramyan =

Marshal of the Soviet Union (1897–1982)

- Иван Баграмян; Հովհաննես Բաղրամյան
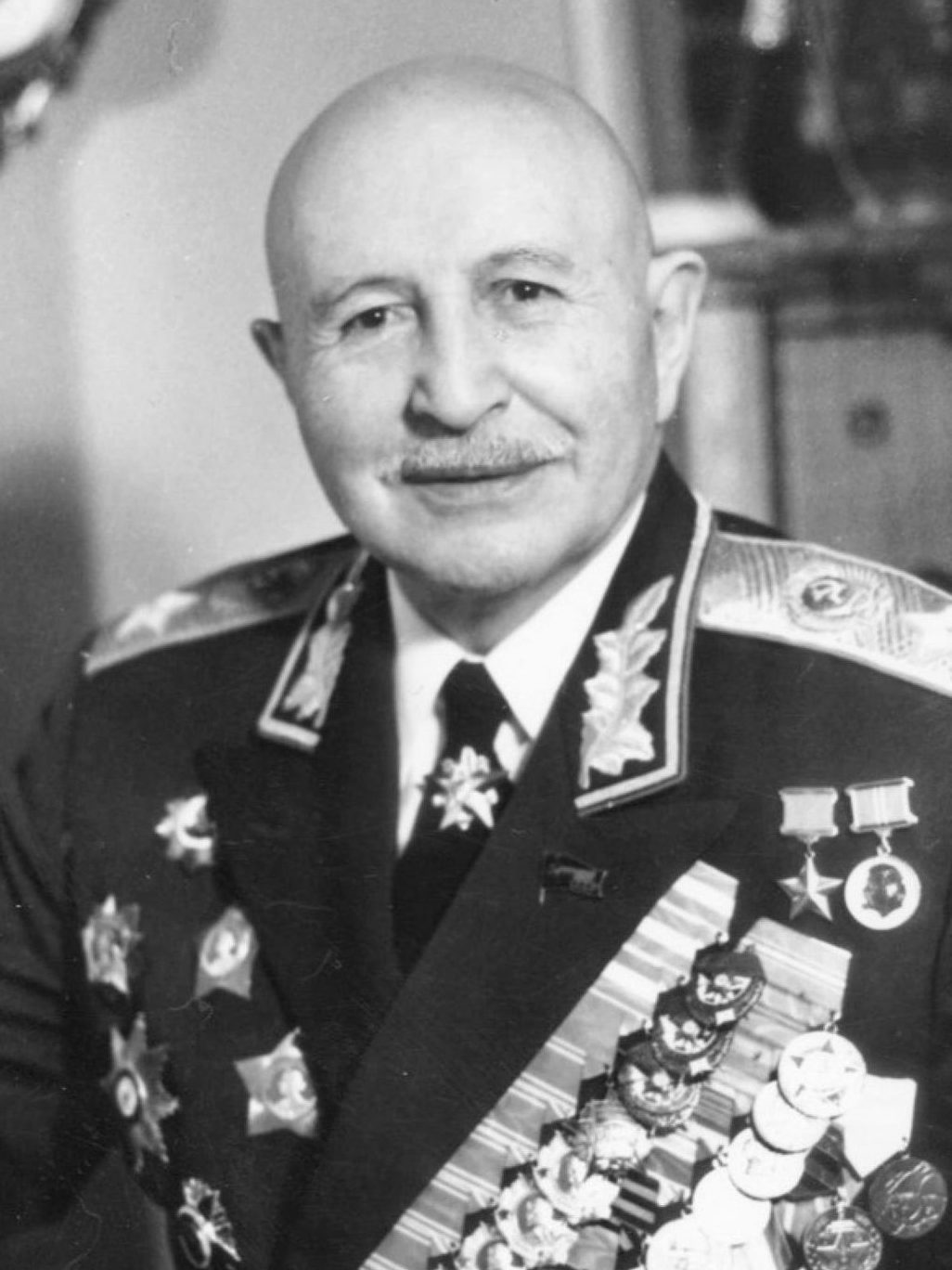
- Bagramyan in 1950

Chief of the Rear Services
- In office 2 June 1958 – 25 April 1968
- President: Nikita Khrushchev; Leonid Brezhnev
- Preceded by: Vasili Vinogradov
- Succeeded by: Sergei Maryakhin

Personal details
- Born: Hovhannes Baghramyan; 2 December 1897 Yelizavetpol, Russian Empire (now in Azerbaijan)
- Died: 21 September 1982 (aged 84) Moscow, Soviet Union
- Resting place: Kremlin Wall Necropolis, Moscow
- Party: Communist Party of the Soviet Union (1941–1982)
- Awards: Hero of the Soviet Union (2)
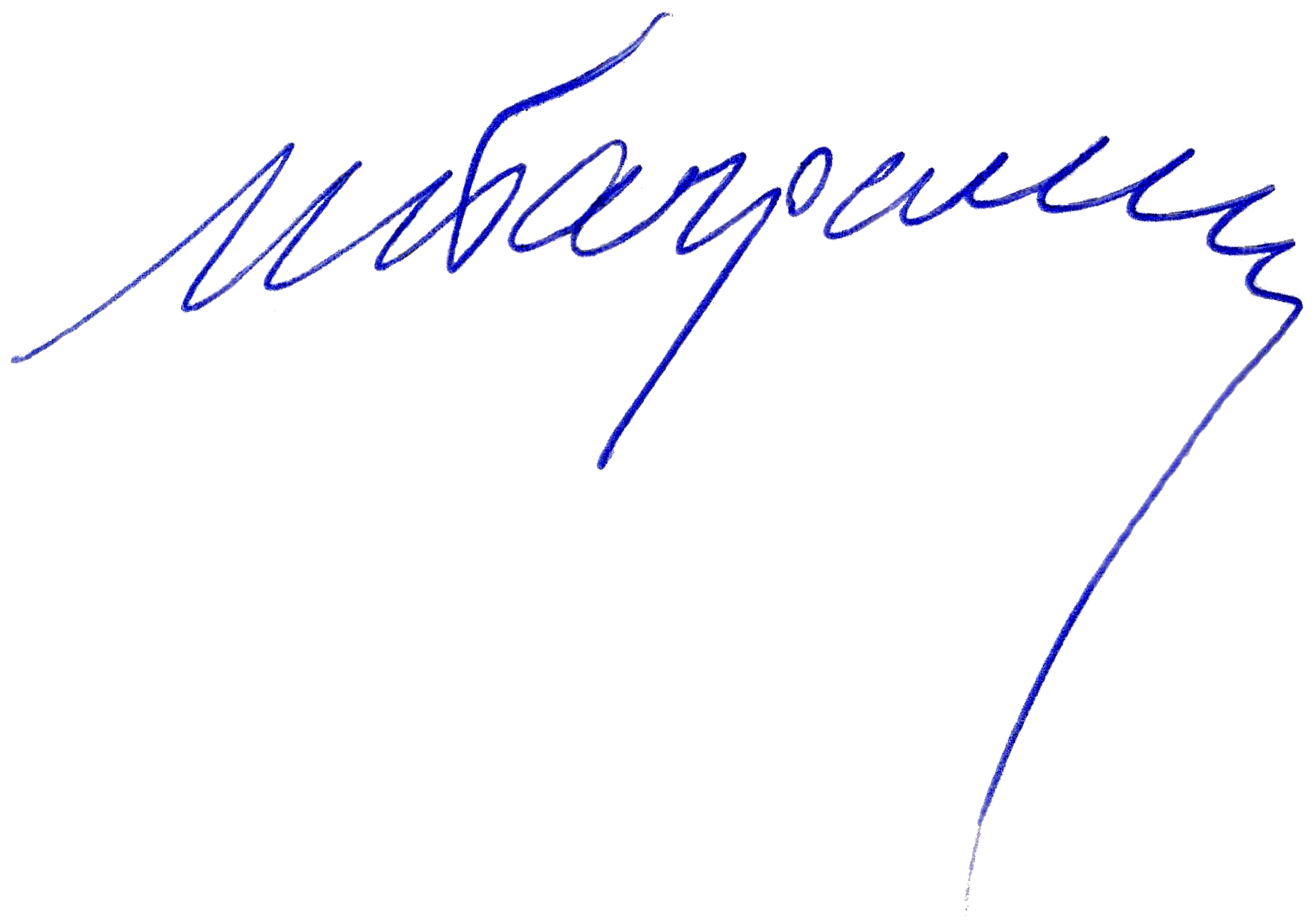
- Signature

Military service
- Allegiance: Russian Empire (1914-1917); Armenia (1918–1920); Soviet Union (1921–1970)
- Branch/service: Imperial Russian Army; Armenian Army; Soviet Army
- Years of service: 1914–1970
- Rank: Marshal of the Soviet Union (1955–1982)
- Commands: 16th Army; 11th Guards Army; 1st Baltic Front; 3rd Belorussian Front; Baltic Military District; General Staff Academy
- Battles/wars: World War I; Caucasus campaign; Battle of Sardarabad; Russian Civil War; May Uprising; Turkish invasion of Armenia; World War II; Operation Barbarossa; Battle of Kiev; Battle of Rostov; Battle of Moscow; Second Battle of Kharkov; Kozelsk Offensive; Battle of Kursk; Operation Citadel; Operation Kutuzov; Operation Bagration; Baltic Offensive; Courland Pocket; Battle of Memel; East Prussian Offensive; Samland Offensive; Battle of Königsberg

Ivan Khristoforovich Bagramyan, (Note: Russian: Ива́н Христофо́рович Баграмя́н) born Hovhannes Baghramyan (Note: full name: Armenian: Հովհաննես Խաչատուրի Բաղրամյան; Hovhannes Khachaturi Baghramyan, his patronymic is alternatively given as Քրիստափորի, Kristapori. Russian: Оване́с Хачату́рович Баграмя́н, Ovanes Khachaturovich Bagramyan. His name is most commonly spelled Bagramyan or Bagramian. However, the Armenian transcription of his name is Baghramyan. This is primarily due to Western sources that used his memoirs, which were published in Russian, transliterated the Russified form of his last name, which omits the letters -gh in its pronunciation. The Armenian pronunciation is [hɔvhɑˈnɛs χɑtʃʰɑtuˈɾi bɑʁɾɑmˈjɑn]) (2 December [O.S. 20 November] 1897 – 21 September 1982), was a Soviet military commander of Armenian origin who held the rank of Marshal of the Soviet Union. As commander of the 1st Baltic Front, he orchestrated the offensives which pushed German forces out of the Baltic countries on the Eastern Front of World War II.

Bagramyan was the second non-Slavic military officer, after Latvian Max Reyter, to become a commander of a front. He was among several high-ranking Armenian officers serving in the Soviet Army during the war. Bagramyan's experience in military planning as a chief of staff allowed him to distinguish himself as a capable commander in the early stages of the Soviet counter-offensives against Nazi Germany. He was given his first command of a unit in 1942, and in November 1943 received his most prestigious command as the commander of the 1st Baltic Front.

He did not immediately join the Communist Party after the consolidation of the October Revolution, becoming a member only in 1941, a move atypical for a Soviet military officer. After the war, he served as a deputy of the Supreme Soviets of the Latvian Soviet Socialist Republic and Armenian Soviet Socialist Republic and was a regular attendee of the Party Congresses. In 1952, he became a candidate for entry into the Central Committee and, in 1961, was inducted as a full member. For his contributions during the war, he was widely regarded as a national hero in the Soviet Union, and continues to hold such esteemed status among Armenians and Russians today.

== Early life ==
Ivan Khristoforovich Bagramyan was born on 2 December [O.S. 20 November] 1897 in Yelizavetpol, a city then part of the Russian Empire and now part of Azerbaijan. His parents, Mariam and Khachatur Bagramyan, were ethnic Armenians originally from the village of Chardakhlu. Bagramyan's paternal grandfather came from the village of Koti. While Bagramyan's father went to work all day at the local railway station, his mother stayed at home to take care of her seven children. Bagramyan's parents decided to enroll him at a recently opened local two-year school because they could not afford to send him to the local gymnasium.

Graduating in 1912, Bagramyan, whom everyone affectionately called Vanya, followed his father and his brothers in a path in rail work, attending the three-year railway technical institute located in Tiflis. He graduated with honors and was slated to become a railway engineer within a few years when events in World War I changed his life.

== World War I ==
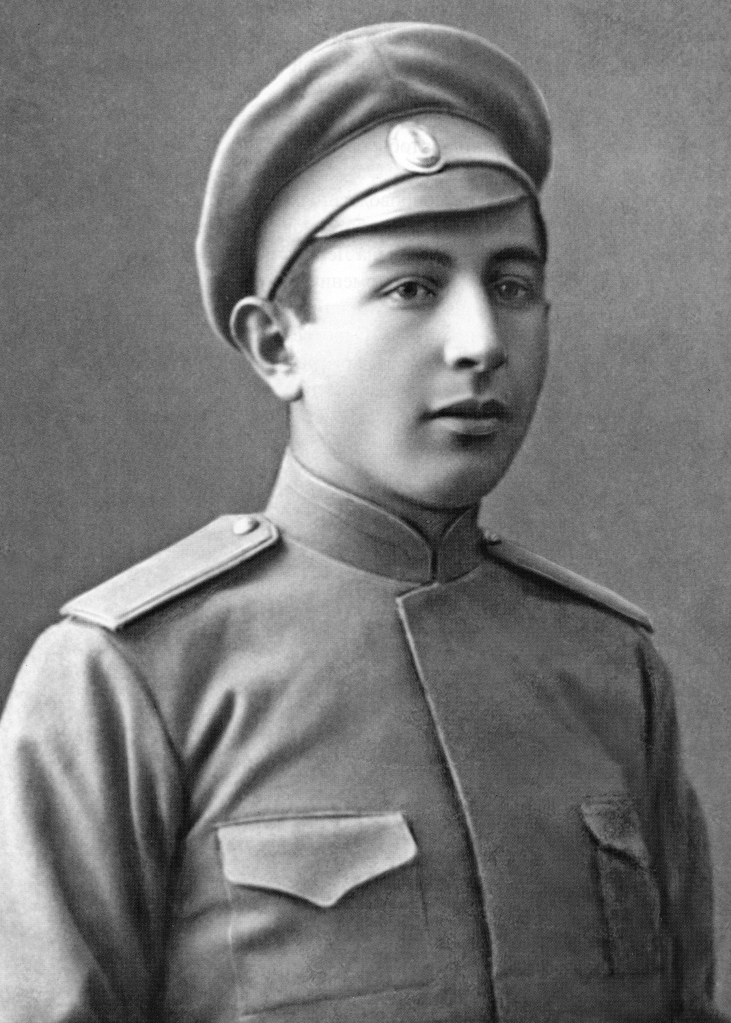
Bagramyan in 1916, while he was serving in the Imperial Russian military

Bagramyan was well aware of the military situation at the Caucasus front during the first months of the world war. In the winter of 1914–15, the Imperial Russian Army was able to withstand and repel the Ottoman offensive aimed at capturing Sarikamish. Bagramyan also began reading harrowing reports in the Russian press of what was taking place against his fellow kinsmen across the border: the Committee of Union and Progress-led government had embarked on a campaign to carry out a genocide of the Ottoman Armenians. He desperately sought to join the military effort but because he was only seventeen and a railway mechanic, he was not subject to conscription. This did not dissuade him from trying, as he later remarked, "My place is at the front."

His opportunity came on 16 September 1915, when he was accepted as a volunteer in the Russian army. He was assigned to the 116th Reserve Battalion and sent to Akhaltsikhe for basic training. With his training complete in December, he joined the 2nd Caucasian Border Regiment of the Russian Caucasus Army, which was sent to dislodge the Ottomans in Persia. Bagramyan participated in battles in Asadabad, Hamedan and Kermanshah, the Russian victories here sending Ottoman forces reeling toward Anatolia.

Learning about the exploits of the men in the outfit, the chief of staff of the regiment, General Pavel Melik-Shahnazarian, advised Bagramyan to return to Tiflis to enroll in the Praporshchik Military Academy. But in order to attend the school, Bagramyan needed to satisfy the academy's requirement of having completed school at a gymnasium. This did not deter him and, after preparing for the courses in Armavir, he passed his exams and began attending the academy on 13 February 1917. He graduated in June 1917 and was assigned to the 3rd Infantry Regiment, stationed near Lake Urmia. But with the overthrow of the Russian Provisional Government in the midst of the October Revolution of 1917, his unit was demobilized.

With the creation of the newly established First Republic of Armenia in 1918, Bagramyan enlisted in the newly formed 3rd Regiment. From 1 April 1918, that is, after the Ottoman Empire signed the Treaty of Brest-Litovsk (3 March 1918) with the Russian SFSR, he was in the 1st Cavalry Regiment, which took part in battles in Karaurgan, Sarikamish and Kars against units of the advancing Ottoman Third Army. Notably, he took part in the May 1918 battle at Sardarapat, where the Armenian military scored a crucial victory against Ottoman forces. He remained in the regiment until May 1920.

== Interwar years ==
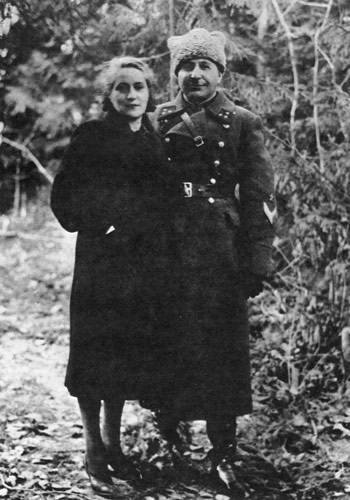
Bagramyan with wife Tamara

Three years after the toppling of the Provisional Government by the Bolsheviks in October 1917, the Red Army invaded the southern Caucasus republics of Azerbaijan, Georgia and Armenia. In May 1920, Bagramyan, upset with the country's social and political conditions, participated in the failed May Uprising against the Dashnak-led government of Armenia. Later that year, he joined the Red Army. He was jailed and sent to work in the fields for several months but was allowed to rejoin the military with the outbreak of the Turkish invasion of Armenia. By December 1920, Armenia was Sovietized and the national army was subsequently disbanded. Bagramyan, however, chose to join the 11th Soviet Army and was appointed a cavalry regiment commander.

As life in Armenia grew relatively more stable under Soviet rule, Bagramyan sought to locate a woman he had met several years earlier, Tamara Hamayakovna. Tamara, who was at this time living in Nakhichevan with her family, had been married to an Armenian officer who had been killed during the Turkish invasion, leaving her with their one-year-old son, Movses. Bagramyan visited her and the two decided to get married at the end of 1922. In addition to their son Movses, who went on to become a painter, they had a daughter, Margarit, who later became a doctor. Tamara remained at Bagramyan's side until her death in 1973.

In 1923, Bagramyan was appointed commander of the Alexandropol Cavalry Regiment, a position he held until 1931. Two years later, Bagramyan graduated from the Leningrad Cavalry School and, in 1934, from the Frunze Military Academy. In his memoirs, Pyotr Grigorenko, a Ukrainian commander who attended the Academy, recalled how Bagramyan was expelled from the academy by his superiors after they had learned that he had been a secret member of the banned Armenian nationalist party Dashnaktsutiun for more than a decade. Pending his arrest, Grigorenko described Bagramyan "deeply depressed, saying he only wished they'd arrest him soon so that he could get it over with." Grigorenko advised that he appeal the arrest warrant, which Bagramyan reluctantly did. The arrest warrant was ultimately dropped, with the help of Armenian politburo member Anastas Mikoyan. From 1934 to 1936, Bagramyan served as the chief of staff of the 5th Cavalry Division, and from 1938, he worked as a senior instructor and lecturer at the Military Academy of the Soviet General Staff even as Stalin purged the senior Soviet officer corps. While fellow students from the military academy, Andrei Yeremenko and Georgy Zhukov, had seen their careers rise, Bagramyan's had remained stagnant.

In 1940, when General Zhukov was promoted to commander of the Kiev Military District in the Ukrainian SSR, Bagramyan wrote a letter asking to serve under his command. Zhukov agreed, and in December asked for his help writing a paper to be presented to the commanders of the Soviet Military Districts. Bagramyan's paper, "Conducting a Contemporary Offensive Operation," apparently impressed Zhukov, as he promoted Bagramyan to become the head of operations for the Soviet 12th Army based in Ukraine. Within three months, however, Bagramyan, then a colonel, was appointed deputy chief of staff of the Southwestern Front, headquartered in Kiev.

== World War II ==
=== Ukraine ===
In June 1941, Nazi Germany invaded the Soviet Union. Unlike many of the border troops who were caught off guard by the offensive, Bagramyan and his commander, General Mikhail Kirponos, believed an invasion by Germany was inevitable. However, Kirponos chose to ignore Bagramyan's belief that the German offensive would employ the Blitzkrieg-like tactics like those seen in the campaigns in Poland in 1939 and western Europe in 1940. Since the winter of 1939–40, Bagramyan had been busy devising a battle plan that would counter threats from the direction of western Ukraine, which was approved after numerous revisions on 10 May 1940.

On the morning of 22 June, he was tasked with overseeing a transfer of a military convoy to Ternopol. While his column was passing the Soviet airfields near the city of Brody, German air strikes hit the aircraft on the ground. Several hours later, they arrived in Ternopol, having been strafed twice by the planes. Three days after the invasion, the plans for the counter-offensive were implemented, but disorder engulfed the troops, and the counter-attack collapsed. Bagramyan took part in the great tank battles in western Ukraine and the defensive operation around Kiev, in which Kirponos was killed and the entire Front captured by the Germans. He was one of a handful of senior officers who escaped from the encircled Front.

Bagramyan was then appointed chief of staff to Marshal Semyon Timoshenko and along with future Soviet premier Nikita Khrushchev, then a political officer, coordinated the fighting around Rostov. In his memoirs, Khrushchev described Bagramyan as a "very precise person who reported on everything just as it was. How many troops we had, their positions, and the general situation."

Khrushchev went on to detail an account where Marshal Semyon Budyonny, sent by the chief of the operations department from Moscow as a representative of Stavka, arrived in Kiev to preside over Bagramyan's court-martial. Bagramyan protested vigorously and said that if his competence was in question, then he should instead be given a field unit to command. To Bagramyan's incredulity, Budyonny went on to attempt to convince him to agree to his execution. Khrushchev remarked that the argument was sparked arbitrarily and had taken place after an "abundant feast with cognac" and that "in those days we didn't take that kind of conversation seriously." According to him, at the time, however, the Soviet military was especially suspicious of the men in its ranks, itself judging that there were "enemies of the people...everywhere, especially the Red Army."

Bagramyan was instrumental in the planning of two Soviet counter-offensives against the Germans, including the major push made by Soviet forces in December during the Battle of Moscow and for this was promoted to the rank of lieutenant general. In the same month, he was made the chief of staff of a military operations group that would oversee three Army Groups: the Southern, the Southwestern and Bryansk Fronts. In March 1942, he accompanied Khrushchev and Timoshenko to Moscow to present the plans of a new counter-offensive in the direction of Kharkov to Stalin. Stalin, impressed with his plan, approved the operation and on 8 April, promoted Bagramyan as chief of staff of the Southwestern Front. On 12 May 1942, armies of the Southwestern Front attacked Kharkov but the launch of the offensive came at an inopportune moment since they were attacking from the Barvenkovo Salient, a region that German forces were near closing.

While Soviet forces were initially successful in recapturing Kharkov, they found themselves trapped by the German Army after the closing of Barvenkovo. On 18 May, Bagramyan asked Timoshenko to alter the plans but Timoshenko along with Stalin refused to approve his request. Soviet losses were heavy as the 6th, 9th and 57th armies (approximately 18–20 divisions) comprising a large portion of the Southwestern Front, were all destroyed and Bagramyan was removed from his post on 28 June by Stavka. According to Khrushchev, Bagramyan was so devastated by the immense loss of men that after the operation was called off: "he burst into tears. His nerves cracked...He was weeping for our army." Held responsible for the failure of the operation and "poor staff work", he was demoted to chief of staff of the Soviet 28th Army. Several days later, he wrote a letter to Stalin asking to "serve at the front at any capacity, however modest." British military historian John Erickson contends that Bagramyan was unfairly scapegoated by Stalin in his attempts to "hunt for [the] culprits" of the mismanagement of operations.

=== 16th Army ===
Though he had never led a fighting unit prior to the war, he was given his first command of an army in the Western Front as his superiors, and particularly Marshal Zhukov were impressed with his skills and capabilities as a staff officer. Zhukov, with the approval of Stavka, appointed him commander of the 16th Army (2nd formation), (July 1942 – April 1943) replacing its former commander, Konstantin Rokossovsky who had been sent to command the Bryansk Front. The 16th Army transferred its troops to the 5th Army, and its command and staff were moved to the second echelon of the Western Front where the Army took up command of part of the 10th Army's troops, and its defensive positions. On 11 August, however, German forces mounted a surprise offensive on the southern flank of Western Front, splitting the 61st Army from the 16th Army which was not taking part in the Rzhev-Sychevka Offensive operation. The German forces threatened Bagramyan's left flank as he quickly moved his forces to counter their movements and halted them from advancing further on 9 September.

With the rest of the Eastern Front battles almost entirely focused on Stalingrad and the Germans' attempts to advance into the Caucasus, the 16th Army was not called up to action until February 1943. By then, the German 6th Army besieged in Stalingrad had been encircled and surrendered. The 16th Army at the time was composed of four divisions and one infantry brigade and in light of the new offensive, Bagramyan's force was given two extra divisions, an infantry brigade, four tank brigades and several artillery regiments.

=== Kursk ===
As the battle of Stalingrad marked the turning point of the war, German forces reorganized for a new offensive in the summer of 1943 to attack the Soviet held Kursk salient in Russia. The German High Command was to deploy veteran units to destroy the salient, including the Ninth Army and the II SS Panzer Corps. Stavka, already informed of the impending offensive, called for an advance toward the German defenses positioned near the town of Kozelsk, which would drive south with the help of the armies of the Central Front. The forces would then proceed to cut off a 75-mile (121 km) gap that would effectively surround the Germans and cut it off from reinforcements. This was similar to Operation Uranus, where the Soviet Army encircled and trapped the Sixth Army in Stalingrad.

Bagramyan's 11th Guards Army (the renamed 16th Army) was tasked to take part in the offensive and was given an additional three infantry divisions and two tank corps, a force composed of fifteen divisions. Bagramyan, however, argued to Stavka that its planning was too audacious in the hopes of repeating a successful encirclement like that in Uranus. He claimed that his forces would be overstretched and would have difficulty in attacking the entrenched German positions in Bolkhov. To avoid a repetition of the failure in Kharkov the previous year, he instead asked that the 61st Army from the Bryansk Front aid his 11th Guards in destroying the German forces in Bolkhov, thus eliminating the Ninth Army's protection from the north. He appealed to his front commander Vasily Sokolovsky as well as the Bryansk's M. A. Reyter, both of whom rejected his proposal. In April, Stavka summoned the main Front commanders to Moscow to brief them on the preparations for the battle. Against the protestations of Sokolovsky and Reyter, Bagramyan proposed his alternative plan to Stalin, who agreed that it would be the more appropriate course to follow. Bagramyan was given twenty days to prepare the 11th Guards Army, and on 24 May reported that his forces were ready. The 11th Guards now was composed of 135,000 men, 280 armored fighting vehicles, 2,700 artillery pieces and several hundred ground-support aircraft. Stalin, however, felt it necessary to further wear thin the fighting abilities of the German forces and delayed the offensive.

Ultimately, it was the Germans who took the initiative by launching Operation Citadel on 5 July in the area around Kursk. German losses were initially heavy due to Soviet defensive preparations. Taking advantage of this, on 12 July, Bagramyan's forces commenced their offensive, codenamed Operation Kutuzov, and quickly breached the German defenses, advancing a distance of 45 miles (72 km) by 18 July. By 28 July, the operation concluded successfully and he was promoted to the rank of Colonel-General. In the following month, his forces took part in the large-scale tank offensives which routed the German assaults and forced Germany to remain on the defensive for the remainder of the war.

=== Belarus ===
With the end of operations in Kursk, the Soviets began a series of offensives on various fronts to push the Germans out of the occupied Soviet republics. In October 1943, Bagramyan's 11th Guards Army was transferred to the Second Baltic Front which was concentrated on the retaking of Belarus and namely, the Baltic republics. In November, Stalin offered Bagramyan the position of head commander of the First Baltic Front which had similar objectives of the Second but was making little headway in its attempts to advance northwards.

Stalin would allow him to retain the 11th Guards and suggested that Colonel-General N. E. Chibisov, an officer he had served under, assume his position. Bagramyan, however, commented that he had had a frictional relationship with Chibisov and instead nominated Lieutenant-General K. N. Galitsky. Stalin, belatedly realizing that Bagramyan was implying that the two would be unable to coordinate harmoniously due to a conflict of holding the same rank, agreed to Bagramyan's suggestion and promoted him to the rank of Army General. He also agreed to have the Second Baltic Front return a tank corps and an infantry division that was taken from the 11th Guards, thus bolstering the forces under Bagramyan to a total of four armies: 11th Guards, 39th, 43rd and the 4th Shock.

In the winter of 1943, his forces advanced forward towards the Belarusian city of Vitebsk. One of the key elements to Bagramyan's success was that many of the soldiers were part of veteran units that had been trained in the Arctic regions of Siberia, enabling them to easily push through entrenched defenses the Germans had spent months preparing. Among the key locations imperative to reach Vitebsk was the small town of Gorodok, which served as a heavily-fortified German communications hub. Despite the strong defenses, Bagramyan was able to utilize his heavy artillery and air support from the Red Air Force in late December to bombard the town and then launched a three-pronged attack, the Gorodok offensive from the ground. The German garrison was overwhelmed, and by 24 December, two infantry divisions and one tank division had surrendered. In Moscow, the news of the victory at Gorodok prompted a 124-cannon salute in honor of Bagramyan and the First Baltic Front.

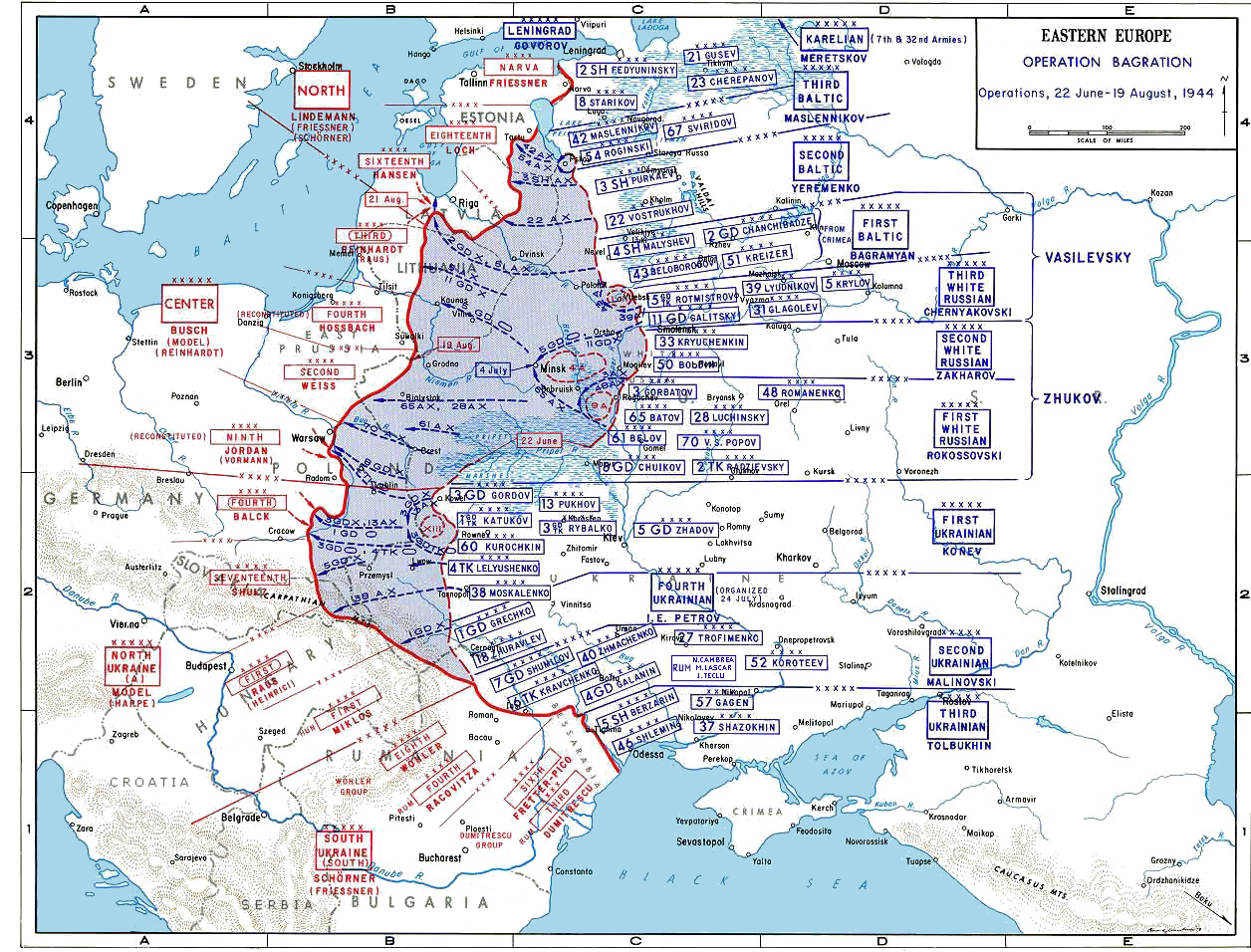
General deployments of Soviet and German forces during Operation Bagration in June 1944

On 2 April 1944 Stalin granted Bagramyan's request to relieve the troops of the Front from offensive duties. However, German forces took advantage of the lull to mount an operation against Soviet partisans in Belarus. Bagramyan's senior staff diverted air support and other crucial supplies to aid the partisans, allowing most of them to escape German encirclement. With the advance of Soviet forces in the Baltic and Ukraine, German Army Group Center had largely been isolated as Stavka prepared to eliminate the pocket (consisting of Third Panzer, Second, Fourth, and Ninth Armies). Stavka's plan, codenamed Operation Bagration was kept secret from all of the involved Front commanders. Bagramyan himself was only informed in May 1944 of his role in the offensive.

Bagration called for the First, Second and Third Belorussian and the First Baltic Fronts to engulf Army Group Center. Bagramyan was tasked with attacking the forces in the pocket, cross the Daugava River and, along with Third Belorussian, clear the surrounding areas of Vitebsk of German forces. Although he felt the plans for the Bagration were sound, he worried about the possibility of a German incursion by Army Group North against his forces from the north. He appealed to his superiors once more, Zhukov and Alexander Vasilevsky, to have the First Baltic Front move westward to help eliminate the Third Panzer Army, thus splitting Army Group North in two. Zhukov and Vasilevsky accepted his argument, introducing it to Stalin in a meeting on 23 May who formally approved it in a directive on 31 May.

Although Bagramyan found it acceptable to sustain heavy casualties (as did all the commanders of the Red Army), he was disturbed with the immense loss of life sustained by his forces. He attempted to reduce those levels primarily by maintaining the element of surprise in operations. In his preparations for Bagration, he planned for the 43rd Army to move through the more geographically difficult swamps and marshlands to Army Group North's right flank. This maneuver would thus take North by surprise since it expected the Soviet offensive to move through more suitable terrain. He proved correct, as in early June 1944, the 43rd achieved success in its attack. Commander of the 43rd Army, General Afanasy Beloborodov, wrote that during the offensive they apprehended a German general who stated that German forces had been blindsided by the attacking forces.

As Bagramyan pushed towards Vitebsk, his forces were aided by the same Belorussian guerrilla fighters who had escaped the German encirclement in April. They provided vital intelligence, including information on the location of bridges and troop movements, and launched attacks against German logistic lines. On 22 June 1944, Bagration began as Bagramyan proceeded in moving westwards as previously planned. However, a widening gap on the Front's northern flank grew as it advanced while the Second Baltic Front, tasked to help defend that area, took no action. Stalin agreed to send a tank corps to reinforce Bagramyan's forces but ordered him to capture Polotsk, which would sever Army Group North's communication lines and open up a route towards the central Baltic. By 3 July, his troops had accomplished the tasks set forth in the directive, destroyed the Third Panzer Army and captured Polotsk. For his achievements, on 7 July he was decorated with the title of Hero of the Soviet Union.

=== Baltics ===
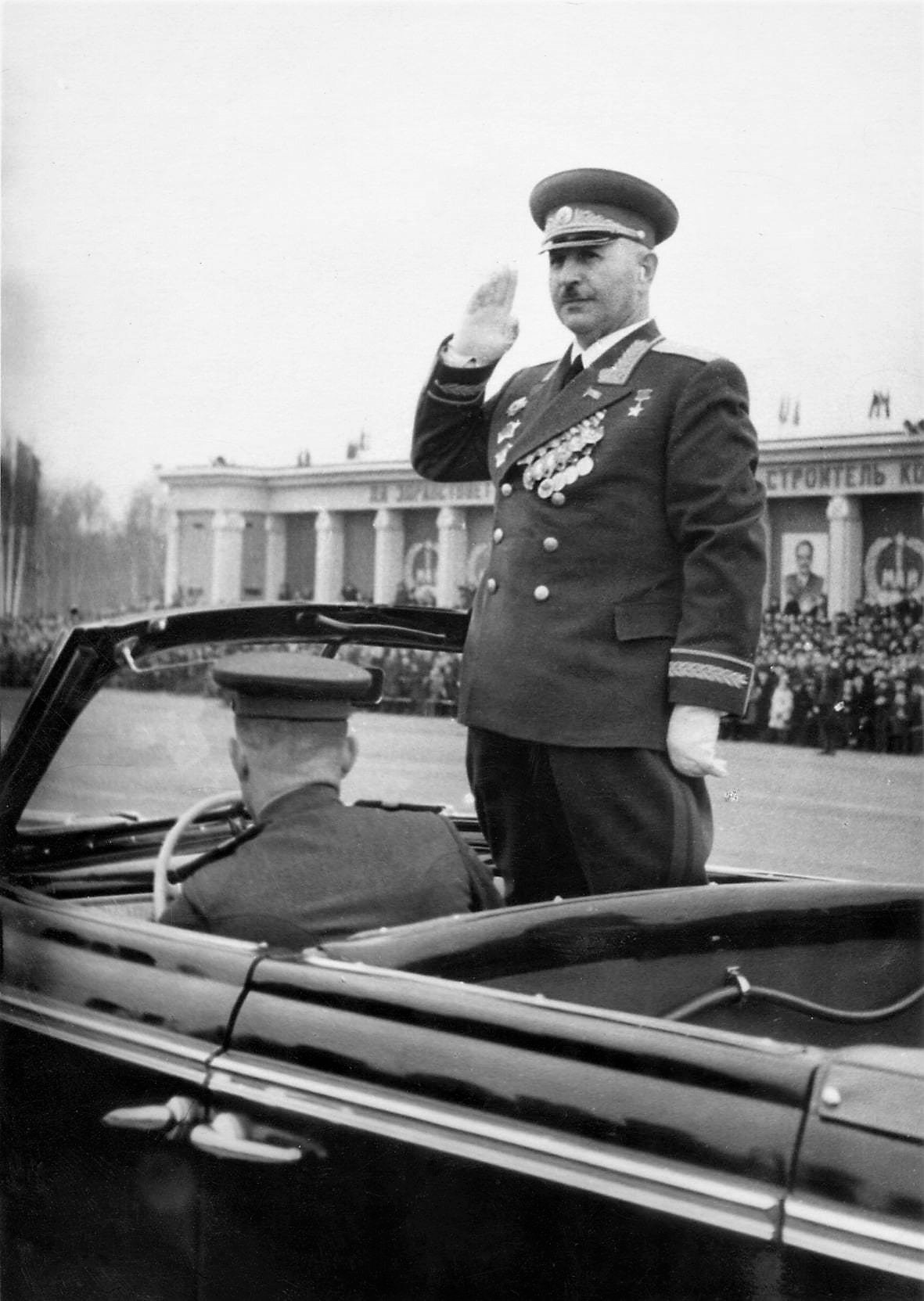
Bagramyan at a military parade in Riga, 1955

With the overall success of Soviet forces in Bagration, his Front was expanded by three armies (although he ceded the 4th Shock Army to Second Baltic), the 39th Army (previously under the command of Third Belorussian), the 51st and the 2nd Guards Armies. The First Baltic Front was ordered by Stavka to move westward in order to stop Army Group North's remaining forces from escaping to Germany. Despite this, Bagramyan inferred that since many of the general orders were being issued to the Wehrmacht by Hitler, rather than the General Staff, and surmised that while there was a possibility that they would confront them in the Lithuanian town of Kaunas, he felt the more likely location would be Riga. He spoke with Vasilevsky, who agreed to change the plans if his theory and intuition proved correct.

As the First Baltic began moving towards Lithuania and into eastern Latvia, it became clear that Army Group North would attempt to outflank Bagramyan's forces near Daugavpils, as he had previously predicted. Vasilevsky, keeping his promise, appealed to Stalin to allow Bagramyan to move to Daugavpils but he refused. Vasilevsky in turn, took it upon his own initiative and gave Bagramyan the go ahead. However, with the loss of 4th Shock Army, Bagramyan was left shortchanged since his promised 39th Army had not only not arrived but was composed of only seven divisions (in comparison to 4th Shock's ten). Feeling that time was being lost, he pressed on with the units he had.

By 9 July, his ground forces had made significant gains in cutting off a vital road that connected Kaunas to Daugavpils. Taking advantage of this, Bagramyan worked with other Front commanders to attack the rear guard of Army Group Center but poor coordination between the units led a stall in the advance. At this time, Bagramyan realized that German forces were most probably not going to easily retreat from the Baltics and so further advances towards Kaunas would be pointless. He proposed to Stavka to launch a full-scale offensive towards Riga but the former rejected his plans, stating that the armies of Second and Third Baltic Fronts would have already pushed Army Group Center to Prussia by the time of the offensive. He attempted to convince them otherwise, citing the numerically deficient forces in the two Fronts, but was rebuffed and ordered to drive towards a road connecting the Lithuanian city of Šiauliai to Riga, resulting in its capture in late July.

With its capture, he persuaded Vasilevsky to allow his forces to move towards Riga, receiving a formal go-ahead by Stavka in a directive on 29 July. On 30 July, his forces finally reached the seaside city of Tukums, near the Bay of Riga, thereby cutting off a total of 38 German infantry and armored divisions in Latvia. For his achievements in this battle, he was given the title of Hero of the Soviet Union. During the month of August, Soviet forces stalled in the Riga offensive, concentrating on halting German attacks. Finally on 14 September 1944, the First, Second and Third Baltic Fronts launched full-scale offensives with the objective of Riga, encountering fierce resistance by its defenders. On 24 September, with his forces only 12 miles (19 km) from Riga, Stavka ordered Bagramyan's forces to abandon it to the Second and Third Baltic Fronts, regroup, and instead advance against Memel. His forces attacked Memel on 5 October and on 10 October, reached the city, effectively preventing Army Group North from retreating to Prussia.

In early 1945, Bagramyan's army, under the overall command of Vasilievsky, took part in the East Prussian offensive. In Operation Samland, Bagramyan's First Baltic Front, now known as the Samland Group, captured Königsberg (now Kaliningrad), in April. On 9 May 1945, he accepted the surrender of the German forces penned up in Latvia, capturing a total of 158 aircraft, 18,000 vehicles, 500 tanks and assault guns among other weaponry.

== Career after World War II ==
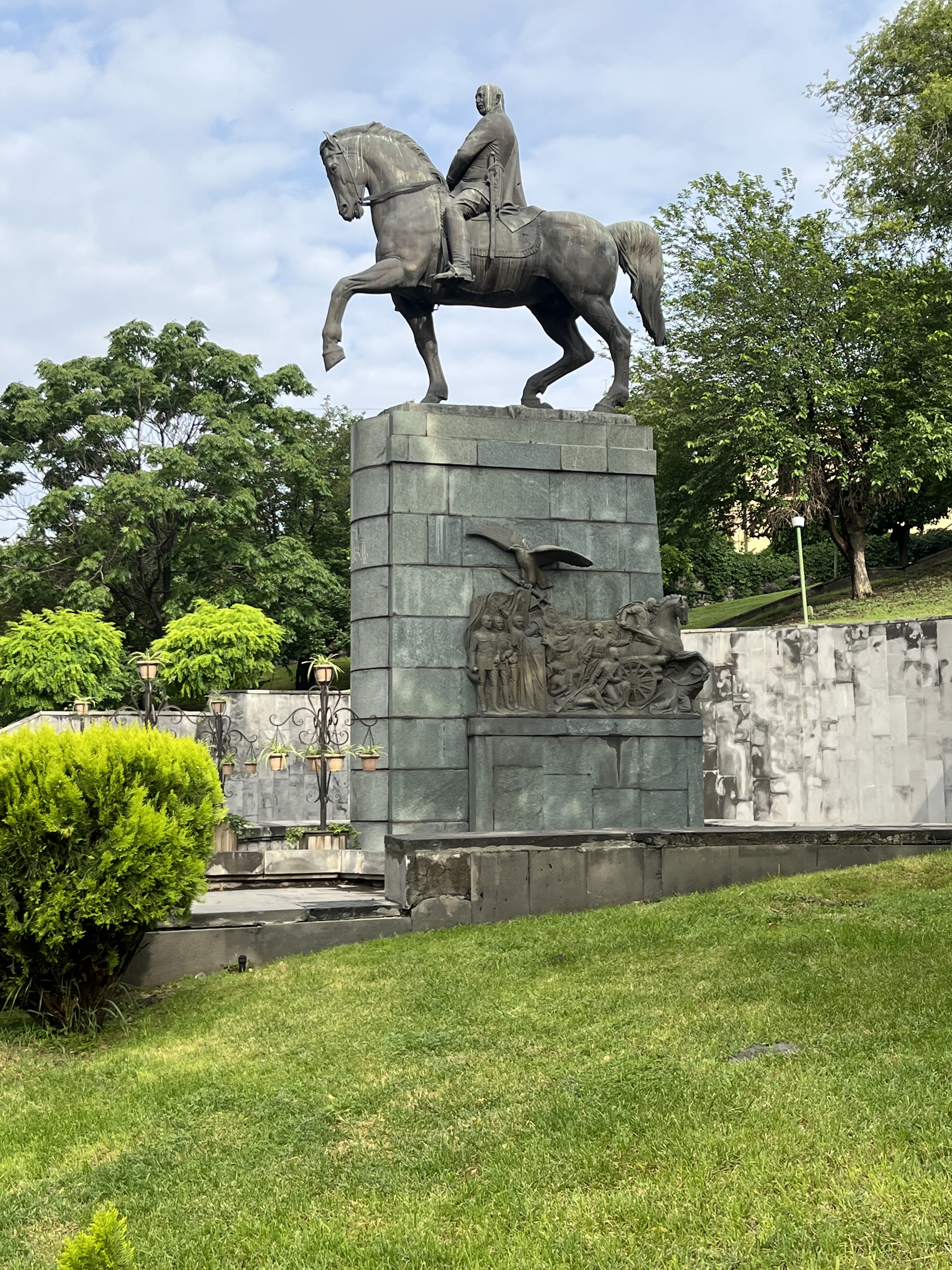
An equestrian statue of Marshal Bagramyan in Yerevan's Baghramyan Avenue, standing in front of the American University of Armenia

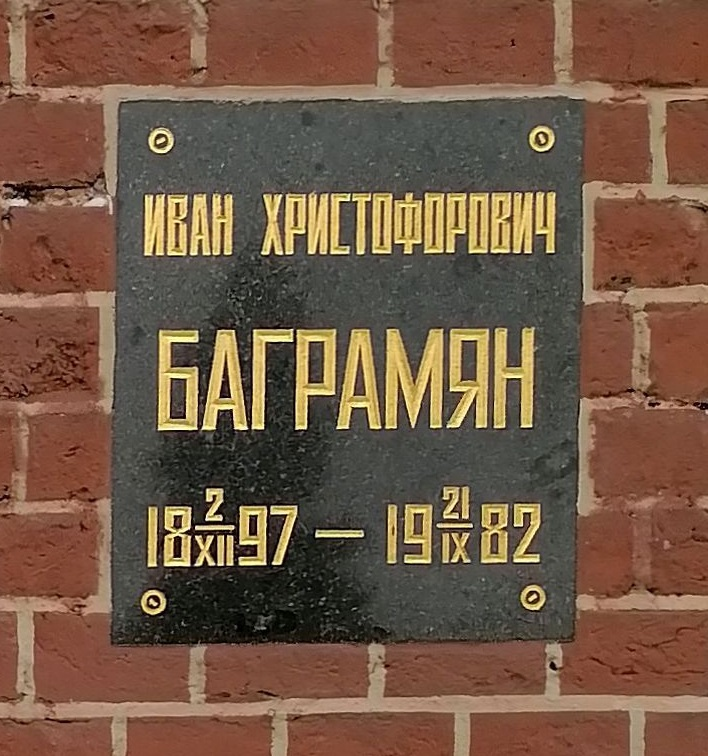
Bagramyan's grave at the Kremlin Wall Necropolis in Moscow

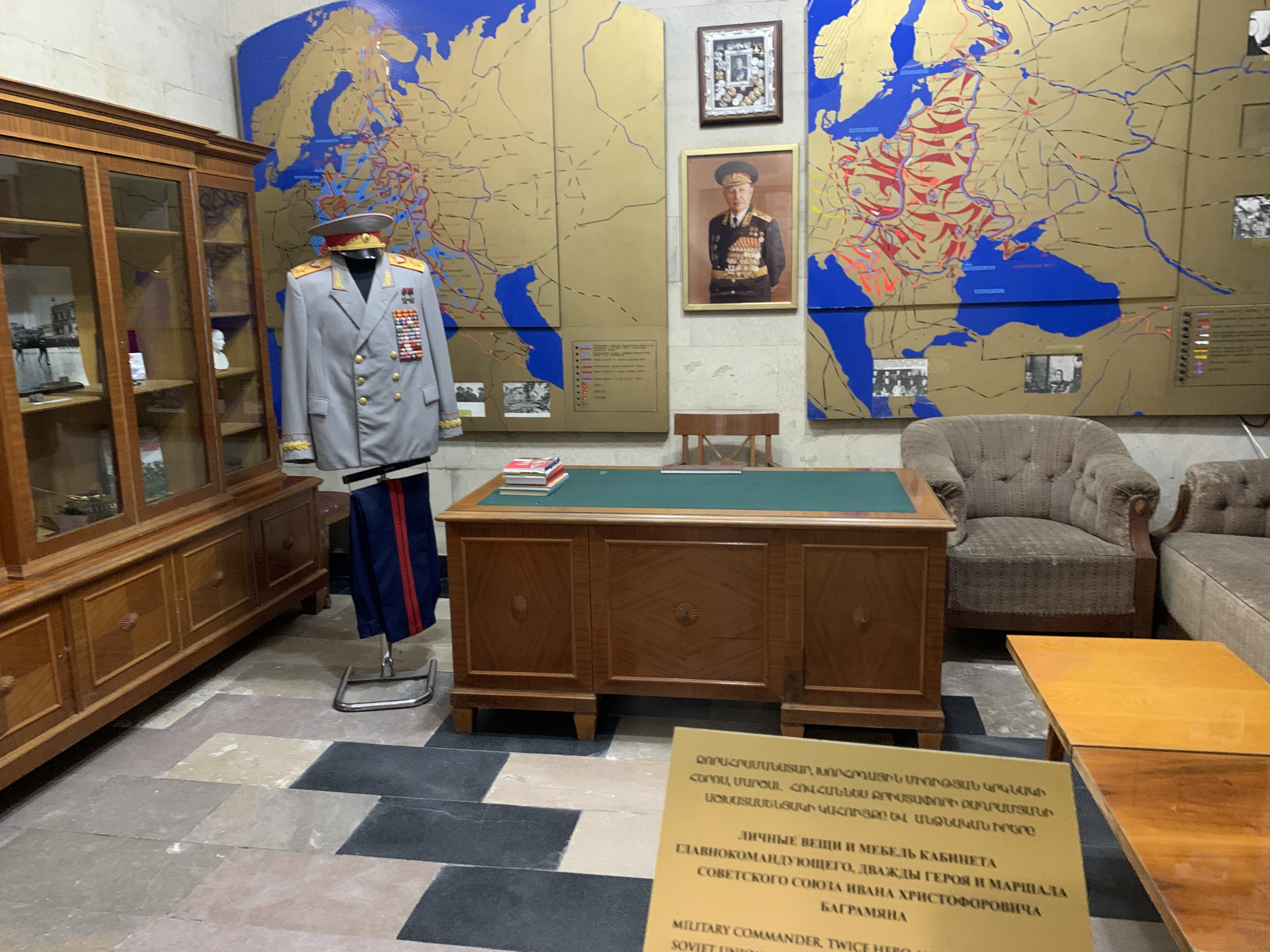
A separate hall in Yerevan's Victory Park museum dedicated to Bagramyan.

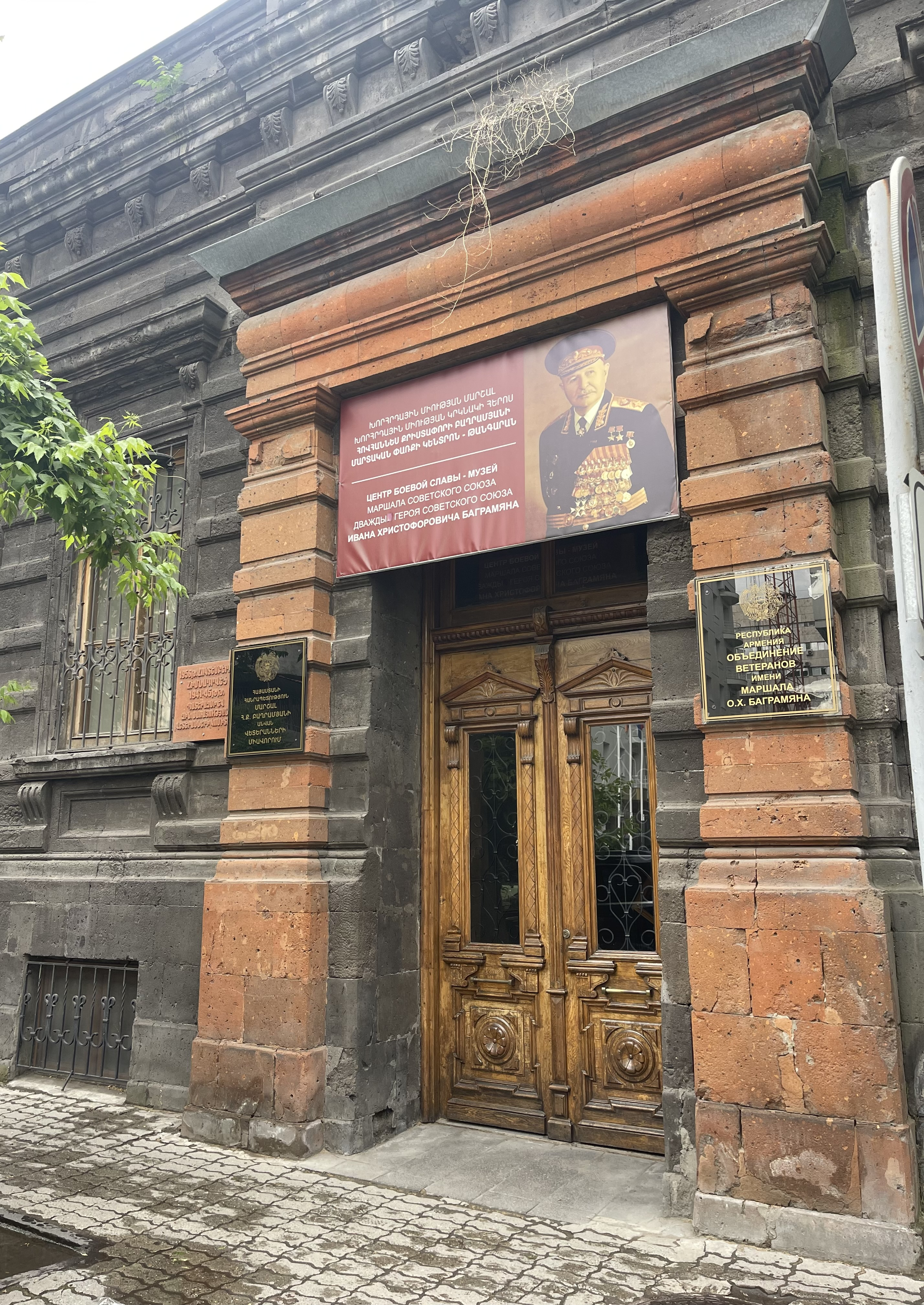
Museum of Military Glory, Yerevan

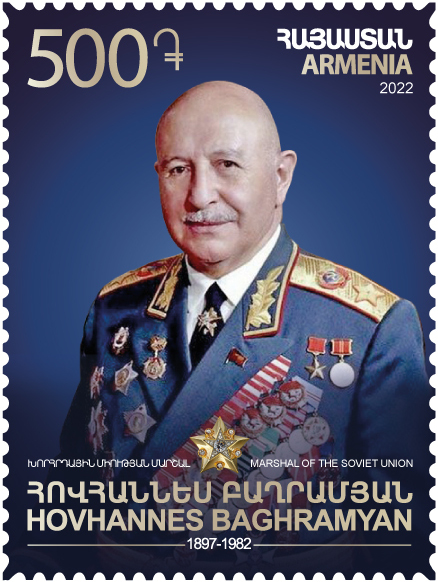
Ivan Bagramyan at stamp of Armenia 2022

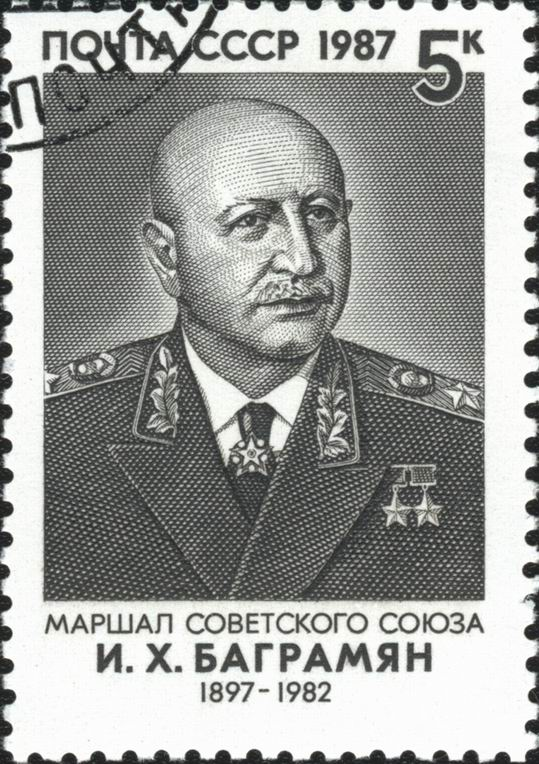
Ivan Bagramyan at stamp of Soviet Union 1987

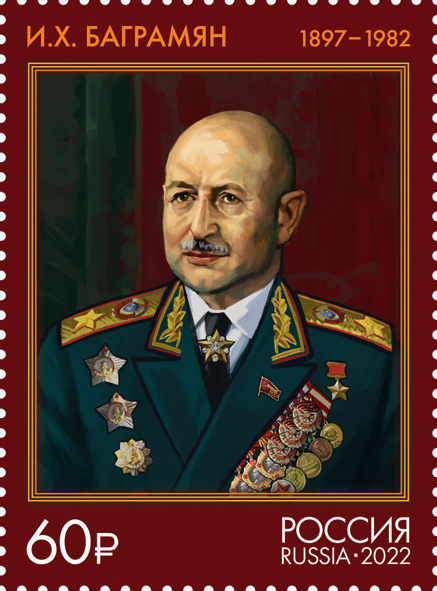
Ivan Bagramyan at stamp of Russia 2022

After the war, Bagramyan remained in command of the Baltic Military District, commanding operations against partisans in Lithuania and Latvia. In 1954, he was appointed chief inspector of the Ministry of Defence. On March 11, 1955, he was appointed Deputy Minister of Defence with the rank of Marshal of the Soviet Union. He was also head of the Military Academy of General Staff.

On 2 June 1958, he was again appointed Deputy Minister of Defence of the USSR - Head of Rear Services of the USSR Ministry of Defence (later - Deputy Minister of Defence of the USSR - Head of Rear Services of the Armed Forces of the USSR).

He spent much of his time writing articles in military journals on Soviet strategic operations and most notably, co-authored the six-volume work on Soviet involvement during World War II, The Soviet Union's Great Patriotic War (1941–1945). In August 1967, Bagramyan accompanied General Secretary Leonid Brezhnev and Premier Alexei Kosygin to North Vietnam, where they met with Vietnamese leaders to arrange the transfer of arms and supplies in advance of the Tet Offensive.

Bagramyan retired on 25 April 1968, and was transferred to the post of General Inspector in the Group of Inspectors General of the Ministry of Defence of the USSR. In 1971, he completed the first volume of his memoirs in This is How the War Began, and in 1977 the second volume, Thus We Went to Victory, was published. Among the numerous points he noted in the second volume was an analysis of the Red Army's costly offensives in the early stages of the war:

There is no point in hiding that before the war we mostly learned to attack, and did not pay enough attention to such an important manoeuvre as retreat. Now we have paid for this. It turned out that the commanders and the staff were not sufficiently prepared to prepare and execute the retreat manoeuvre. Now, in the second week of war, we had in fact to learn from the beginning the most difficult art – the art of the execution of retreat.

In 1979, another book of Bagramyan titled My Memoirs was published and was based on the first and second volumes. A large portion of the book was dedicated to the Armenian issues including the territories of Western Armenia, massacres of Armenians by the Ottoman Empire and the Armenian Genocide, the Ottoman invasion of Armenia and the Battle of Sardarapat, as well as other topics.

Marshal Bagramyan was awarded numerous Soviet and foreign orders and medals for his service, including two Orders of the Hero of the Soviet Union, seven Orders of Lenin, the Order of the October Revolution, three Orders of the Red Banner, two Orders of Suvorov and the Order of Kutuzov. Among the other commendations he received were the Polish Polonia Restituta twice and the Medal "For the Victory Over Germany".

After the death of Marshal Vasily Chuikov on 18 March 1982, he was the last surviving Soviet Marshal who had held a high command in World War II. However, Bagramyan was ill and died a few months later, on 21 September 1982, at the age of 84. He was buried with full military honors at the Kremlin Wall Necropolis in Moscow. A town and district (raion) in Soviet Armenia, a military firing range, an Armenian Army training brigade, and a subway station and a major avenue in the capital Yerevan, have been named in his honor. On 11 May 1997, the government of Armenia established the commemorative 100th Anniversary of Marshal Bagramyan medal. It is awarded to service and civilian personnel who participated in the Second World War.

== Honours and awards ==
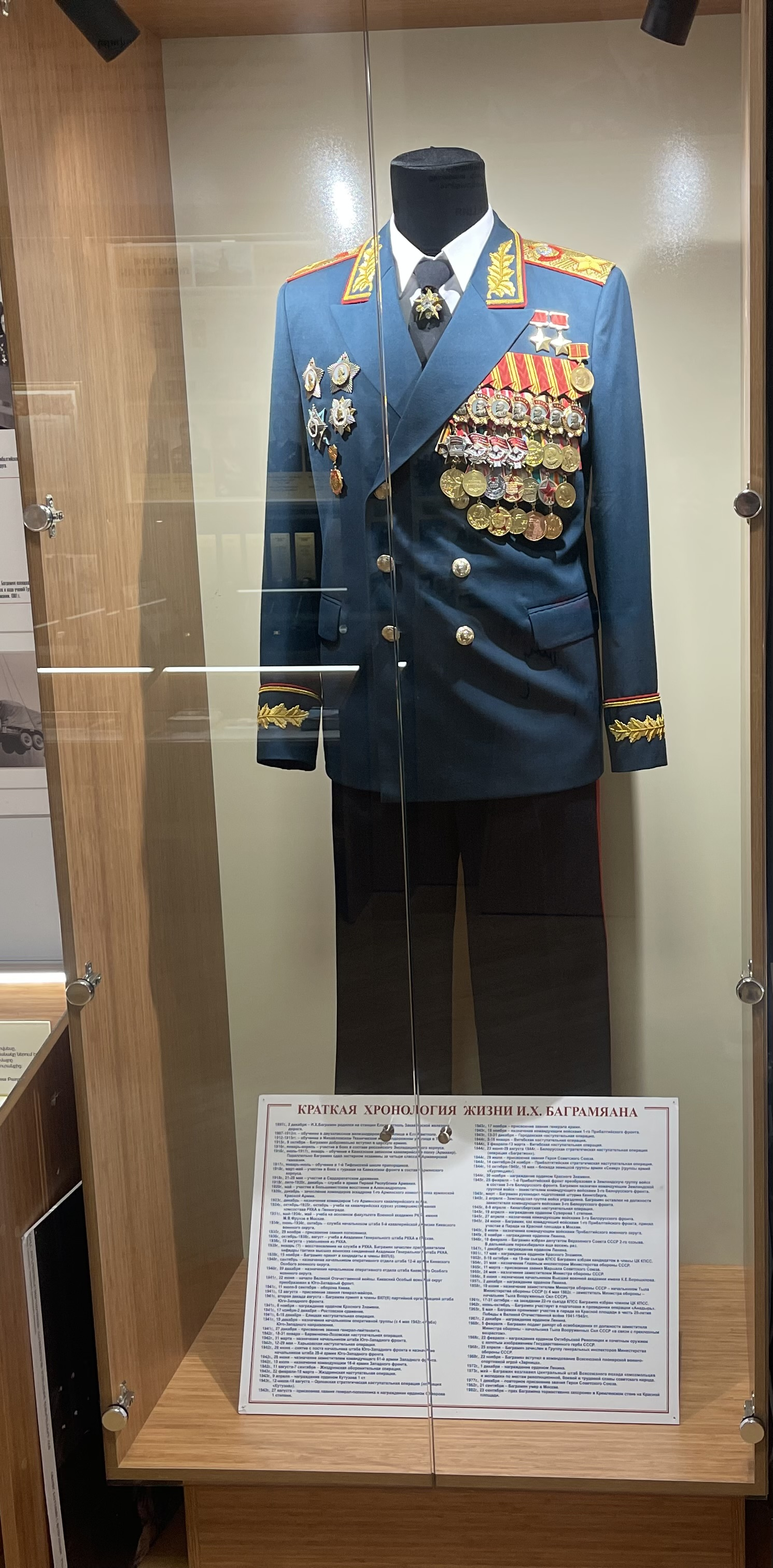
Bagramyan's ceremonial jacket. Museum in Yerevan, Khorenatsi st., 22

Hero of the Soviet Union, twice (29 July 1944, 1 December 1977)
Seven Orders of Lenin (29 July 1944, 6 November 1945, 1 December 1947, 2 December 1957, 1 December 1972, 27 December 1967, 1 December 1977)
Order of the Red Banner, three times (6 November 1941, 30 November 1944, 17 May 1951)
Order of Suvorov, 1st class, twice (27 August 1943, 19 April 1945)
Order of Kutuzov, 1st class (9 April 1943)
Order of the Red Star (16 August 1936)
Order "For Service to the Homeland in the Armed Forces of the USSR", 3rd degree (30 April 1975)
Honorary weapon – sword inscribed with golden national emblem of the Soviet Union (1968)
Several Medals of USSR

Foreign

Order of the People's Republic of Bulgaria, 1st class, twice (Bulgaria)
Medal of Sino-Soviet Friendship (China)
Medal "For Strengthening Friendship in Arms", Golden degree (Czechoslovakia)
Order of Karl Marx (East Germany)
Order of Sukhbaatar (Mongolia)
Order of the Red Banner (Mongolia)
Medal "30 years of the Victory in Khalkhin-Gol" (Mongolia)
Medal "50 Years of the Mongolian People's Revolution" (Mongolia)
Medal "30 Years of Victory over Militaristic Japan" (Mongolia)
Medal "50 years of the Mongolian People's Army" (Mongolia)
Order of Polonia Restituta, 5th class, twice (Poland)
Brotherhood of Arms Medal (Poland)

== Bibliography ==
- Erickson, John (1999). The Road to Berlin: Stalin's War with Germany. Vol. 2. New Haven, CT: Yale University Press. ISBN 978-0300078138.
- Jukes, Geoffrey (2001). "Ivan Khristoferovich Bagramyan". In Shukman, Harold (ed.). Stalin's Generals. Phoenix, Arizona: Phoenix Press. ISBN 978-1842125137.
- Khrushchev, Nikita (2005). Memoirs of Nikita Khrushchev. Vol. 1: Commissar (1918–1945). Philadelphia: Pennsylvania State University Press. ISBN 978-0271023328.
- Mnatsakanian, Aramayis N. (1978). Marshal Baghramyan: Kyanki yev gortsuneutyan urvagits [Marshal Baghramyan: An Outline of His Life and Work] (in Armenian). Yerevan: Hayastan.
- Salisbury, Harrison E. (2003). The 900 Days: The Siege of Leningrad. Cambridge: Da Capo Press. ISBN 978-0306812989.

== Memoirs ==
- (in Russian) Part I: Bagramyan, Ivan Kh. Tak nachilas' voina [This is How the War Began]. Moscow: Voenizdat, 1971.
- (in Russian) Part II: Bagramyan, Ivan Kh. Tak shli my k pobede [Thus We Went to Victory]. Moscow: Voenizdat, 1977.
