= Erhard Raus =

Austrian-German general (1889–1956)

- Born: 8 January 1889; Wolframitz, Austria-Hungary (now Olbramovice, Czech Republic)
- Died: 3 April 1956 (aged 67); Vienna, Austria
- Military career
- Allegiance: Austria-Hungary; First Austrian Republic; Nazi Germany
- Branch: German Army
- Service years: 1909–1945
- Rank: Generaloberst
- Commands: 6th Panzer Division; XI Corps; 3rd Panzer Army
- Conflicts: World War I; World War II; Operation Little Saturn; Evacuation after Operation Citadel; Second Battle of Kiev; Operation Doppelkopf; East Prussian Offensive; Battle of Memel
- Awards: Knight's Cross of the Iron Cross with Oak Leaves

Erhard Raus (8 January 1889 – 3 April 1956) was an Austrian general in the Wehrmacht of Nazi Germany during World War II. He commanded the 6th Panzer Division during the early years of the war on the Eastern Front before taking army and army group commands.

== Biography ==
At the age of 18, Raus enrolled in the Austro-Hungarian officer school in Brno, later being stationed in Cormòns. During the First World War he experienced combat on the Eastern Front, in southern Poland, where he commanded a company of Bicycle infantry.

At the end of First World War, he was included in the newly formed Austrian army, first as the commander of the Vienna bicycle infantry battalion, later as a tactician at the military academy.

After the annexation of Austria to Germany in 1938, he transferred allegiance to the German military, becoming the military attaché of the German embassy in Rome.

At the outbreak of Second World War, he was recalled to active duty.

On 7 September 1941, during Operation Barbarossa, Raus was appointed the acting commander of the 6th Panzer Division. On 15 September, the 6th Panzer Division, minus its artillery, was transferred to Army Group Centre to take part in Operation Typhoon, the advance onto Moscow. On 11 October he was awarded the Knights Cross. Raus's unit was transferred to the LVI Panzer Corps.

In early April, the 6th Panzer Division was transferred to France to refit and rest; Raus was appointed the commander of the division on 29 April. In mid-November 1942, the division left France for the Soviet Union. Following the failure of Operation Citadel (the Kursk offensive), he organized the withdrawal of Axis units across the Dnieper river. On 10 December 1943 he was appointed acting commander of the Fourth Panzer Army. Several days later he moved the divisions across the river as well as thousands of plundered cattle and horses. Raus commanded the 1st Panzer Army, then the 3rd Panzer Army (August 1944 – March 1945) which included the III SS Panzer Corps, XI SS Army Corps and Corps Group Tettau (early March 1945).

After the war, Raus wrote and co-wrote a number of books and publications focusing on strategic analysis of the tank tactics used by his forces on the Eastern Front.

Raus died on 3 April 1956. He was buried in Vienna with full military honors on 6 April.

== Memoirs ==
Writing in his book Panzer Operations, Raus emphasized flexible mobile defense and the importance of terrain, weather, and logistics in armored warfare. He described how extreme climate conditions, particularly mud seasons and severe winter temperatures, constrained mechanized operations and required decentralized command decisions at lower levels. Raus argued that successful German defensive actions often depended on rapid improvisation, temporary local superiority, and coordinated withdrawal rather than rigid adherence to prewar doctrine. His accounts provide detailed operational observations from engagements ranging from the advance toward Moscow to later defensive battles during the Soviet counteroffensives.

== Awards ==
- Iron Cross (1939) 2nd Class (29 June 1941) & 1st Class (6 July 1941)
- German Cross in Gold on 14 February 1943 as Generalmajor and commander of the 6. Panzer-Division
- Knight's Cross of the Iron Cross with Oak Leaves
  - Knight's Cross on 11 October 1941 as Oberst and commander of the 6. Schützen-Brigade
  - Oak Leaves on 22 August 1943 as General der Panzertruppe and commanding general of the XI. Armeekorps

== Works ==
- Panzer Operations: The Eastern Front Memoir of General Raus, 1941–1945 (edited and translated by Steven H. Newton), ISBN 978-0-306-81247-7
- Peculiarities of Russian warfare (German report series, 1949), OCLC 38291522
- Tactics in unusual situations (Small unit tactics, 1951), OCLC 37669938
- Improvisations and field expedients: Their use as instruments of command (1951), OCLC 38373401
- Effects of climate on combat in European Russia (German Report Series, CMH Pub 104-6, 1952)
- The Pomeranian battle and the command in the east (1952) OCLC 14445144
- Strategic deceptions (Deceptions & Cover Plans Project # 29, 1948), OCLC 37161255

Military offices
Preceded by Generalleutnant Franz Landgraf	Commander of 6th Panzer Division; 29 April 1942–7 February 1943	Succeeded by Generalleutnant Walther von Hünersdorff
Preceded by —	Commander of XI Corps (known as Provisional Corps Raus until 10 May 1943); 10 February 1943–5 November 1943	Succeeded by —
Preceded by General of Panzer Troops Heinrich Eberbach	Commander of XLVII Panzer Corps; 5 November 1943–30 November 1943	Succeeded by General of Panzer Troops Hermann Balck
Preceded by Generaloberst Hermann Hoth	Commander of 4. Panzer-Armee; 10 November 1943–21 April 1944	Succeeded by General of Panzer Troops Walter Nehring
Preceded by Generalorberst Hans Hube	Commander of 1. Panzerarmee; 21 April 1944–July, 1944	Succeeded by —
Preceded by General of Panzer Troops Erhard Raus	Commander of Armeegruppe Raus; July, 1944–August, 1944	Succeeded by Generaloberst Gotthard Heinrici
Preceded by Generaloberst Georg-Hans Reinhardt	Commander of 3. Panzer-Armee; 16 August 1944–10 March 1945	Succeeded by General Hasso-Eccard von Manteuffel
