= Georg-Hans Reinhardt =

German general and war criminal (1887–1963)

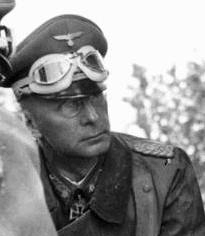
- Reinhardt during World War II
- Born: 1 March 1887; Bautzen, Kingdom of Saxony, German Empire
- Died: 22 November 1963 (aged 76); Tegernsee, Bavaria, West Germany
- Military career
- Allegiance: German Empire; Weimar Republic; Nazi Germany
- Branch: German Army
- Service years: 1907–1945
- Rank: Generaloberst
- Commands: 4th Panzer Division; XLI Panzer Corps; 3rd Panzer Army; Army Group Centre
- Conflicts: World War I; World War II; Invasion of Poland; Battle of France; Invasion of Yugoslavia; Operation Barbarossa; Battle of Moscow; Nazi security warfare; Operation Doppelkopf; Gumbinnen Operation
- Awards: Knight's Cross of the Iron Cross with Oak Leaves and Swords
- Criminal information
- Convictions: War crimes Crimes against humanity
- Trial: High Command Trial
- Penalty: 15 years (released in 1952)

Details
- Victims: Soviet prisoners of war Soviet civilians (Jews and Slavs)

Georg-Hans Reinhardt (1 March 1887 – 23 November 1963) was a German general of the Wehrmacht during World War II, who was subsequently convicted of war crimes. He commanded the 3rd Panzer Army from 1941 to 1944, and Army Group Centre in 1944 and 1945, reaching the rank of colonel general (Generaloberst).

Following the war, Reinhardt was tried in the High Command Trial, as part of the Subsequent Nuremberg Trials. He was found guilty of war crimes and crimes against humanity and sentenced to 15 years. He was released in 1952.

== World War II ==
Born in 1887, Reinhardt fought during World War I. He commanded the 4th Panzer Division during the Invasion of Poland in September 1939. In the 1940 Battle of France, Reinhardt commanded the XXXXI Panzer Corps.

=== Operation Barbarossa ===
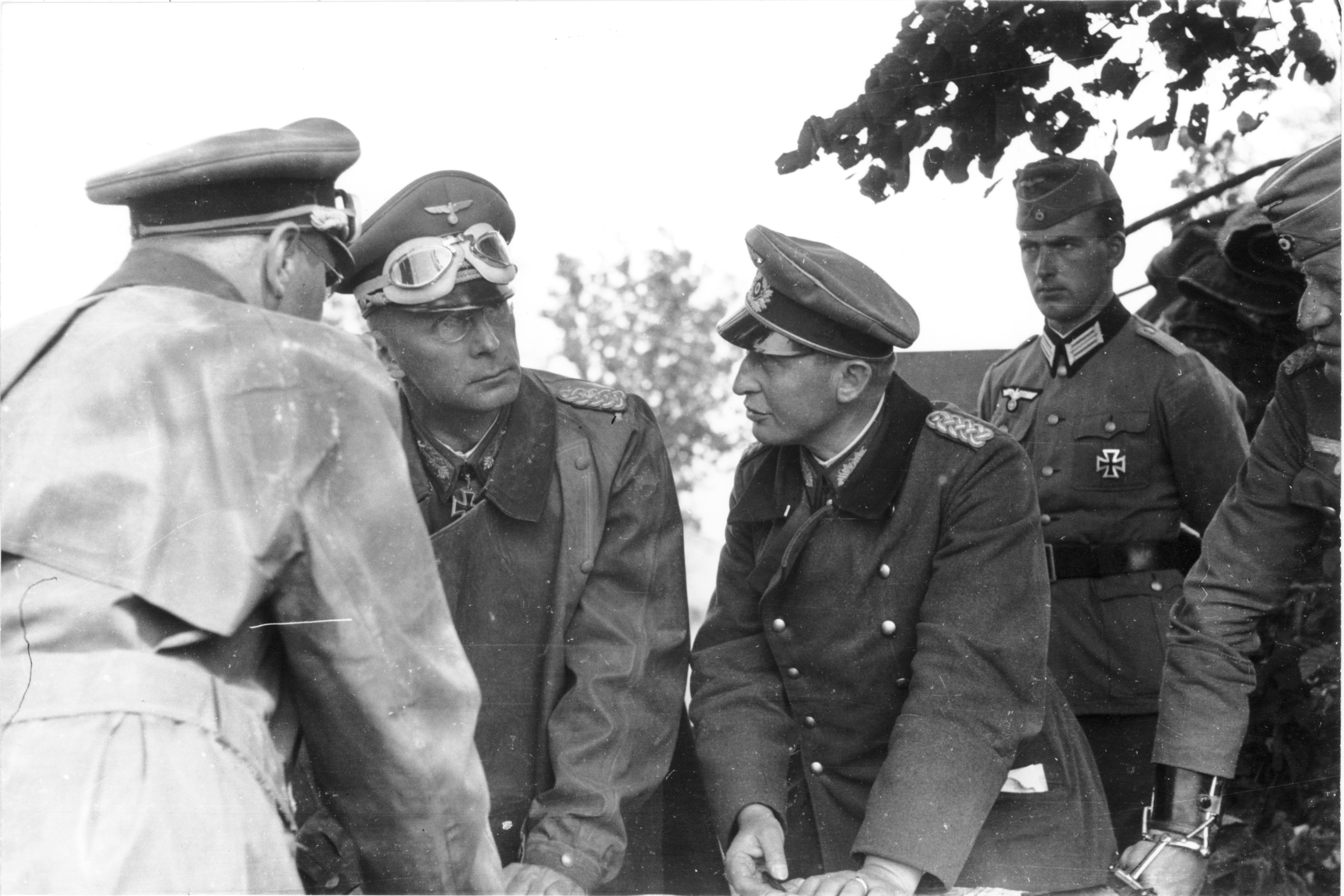
Georg-Hans Reinhardt (2nd from left) and Walter Krüger, 1941

In 1941, Reinhardt and XLI Panzer Corps were deployed on the Eastern Front for Operation Barbarossa, the invasion of the Soviet Union in June. In late June Reinhardt's Corps defeated the Soviet 3rd Mechanised & 12th Mechanised Corps in the Battle of Raseiniai and destroyed over 700 Soviet tanks. His force led the advance of Army Group North to the outskirts of Leningrad in October. As did all German corps on the Eastern Front, Reinhardt's corps implemented the criminal Commissar Order. According to reports from subordinate units, the order was carried out on a widespread basis.

On October 5 Reinhardt was given command of the 3rd Panzer Army in Army Group Centre and took part in Operation Typhoon, the advance towards Moscow. After the German defeat in the Battle of Moscow, his army was driven back by Soviet counter-attack during the winter of 1941−42. Troops under Reinhardt's command implemented the OKH policy of "liquidating" mentally infirm; in December 1941 they murdered ten mental patients in the Russian city of Kalinin, on the pretext that they posed a security threat.

=== Security warfare ===
From early 1942 until June 1944, the 3rd Panzer Army operated around Vitebsk and Smolensk. In the course of rear-security operations in the area, troops under Reinhardt command destroyed entire communities. A report of February 1943 stated:

In order to keep bandits from resettling in this territory, the population of villages and farms in this area were killed without exception to the last baby. All homes were burned down.

The army engaged in deportations of civilians to concentration camps. Between September and December 1943, nearly 4,000 civilians were deported from Vitebsk and surrounding areas, because they were suspected of helping "bandits" (quotation marks in the original). The action was conducted in cooperation with units of the SD; civilians, including women and children, were deported to Auschwitz concentration camp, where they died from starvation and maltreatment or were later gassed.

In June 1944, during Operation Bagration, the Third Panzer and the rest of Army Group Centre were shattered by the Red Army and driven back into Poland and East Prussia. On 16 August 1944, Reinhardt was given command of Army Group Centre. In December, renewed Soviet attacks drove Army Group Centre out of Poland into northern Prussia. Reinhardt was retired from active duty in January 1945.

== Trial and conviction ==
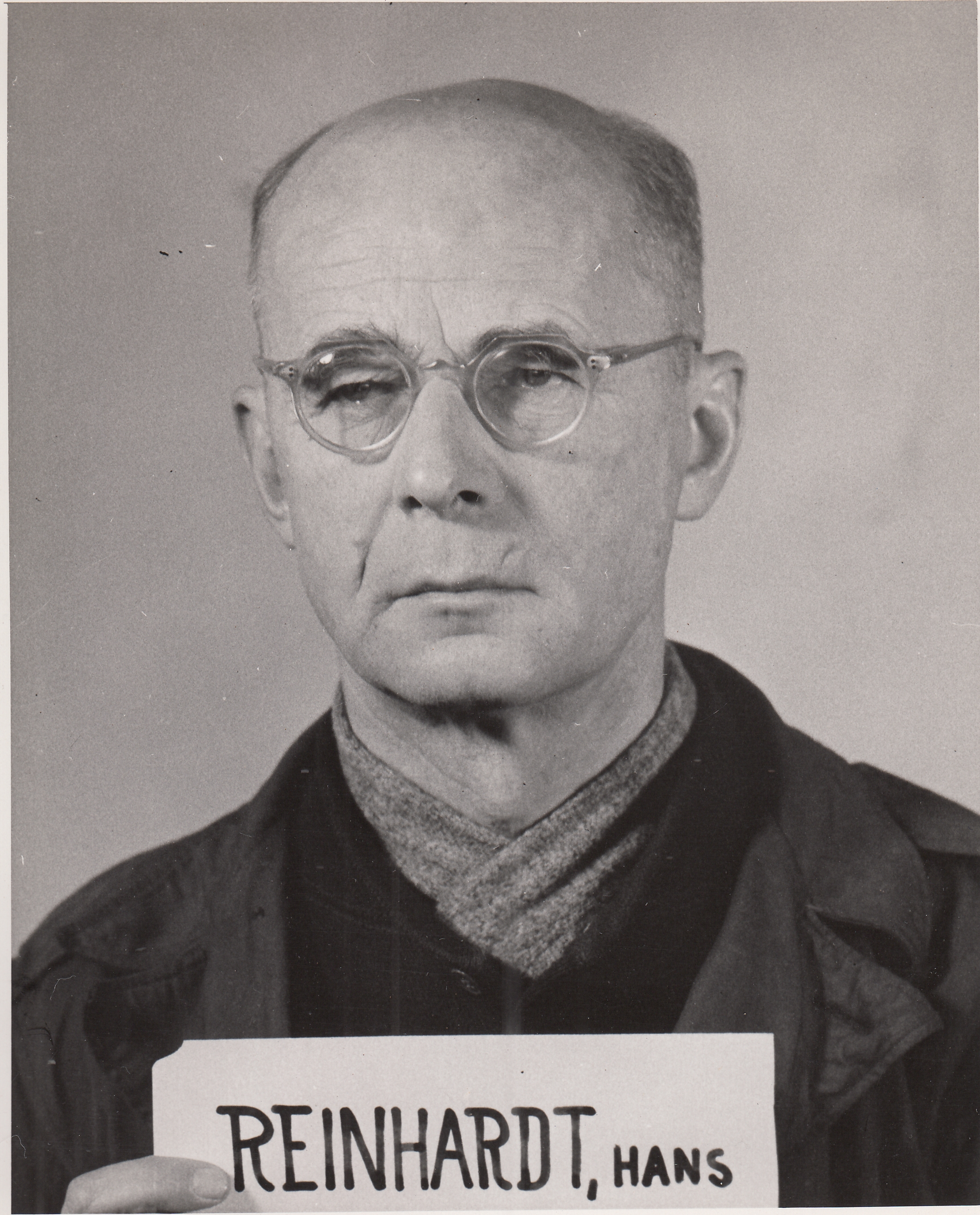
Georg-Hans Reinhardt in custody before the High Command Trial

In June 1945, Reinhardt was captured by the Special Air Service. In 1948, he was tried in the High Command Trial, as part of the Subsequent Nuremberg Trials. Reinhardt was found guilty of war crimes and crimes against humanity, including murder and mis-treatment of Soviet prisoners of war, and of murder, deportation, and hostage-taking of civilians in occupied countries. He was sentenced to 15 years imprisonment, and served time in the Landsberg Prison. His sentence was reviewed in January 1951, with no changes. Reinhardt was released in 1952 on compassionate grounds.

From 1954 Reinhardt served as president of the Gesellschaft für Wehrkunde (Society for Military Science), present-day Gesellschaft für Sicherheitspolitik (Society for Security Policy). He was awarded the Order of Merit of the Federal Republic of Germany in 1962.

== Awards ==
- Iron Cross (1914) 2nd Class (14 September 1914) & 1st Class (8 August 1915)
- Clasp to the Iron Cross (1939) 2nd Class (21 September 1939) & 1st Class (2 October 1939)
- Knight's Cross of the Iron Cross with Oak Leaves and Swords
  - Knight's Cross on 27 October 1939 as Generalleutnant and commander of 4. Panzer-Division
  - Oak Leaves on 17 February 1942 as General der Panzertruppe and commander of 3. Panzergruppe
  - Swords on 26 May 1944 as Generaloberst and commander of 3. Panzer-Armee
- Great Cross of Merit (24 November 1962)

Military offices
Preceded by none	Commander of 4th Panzer Division; 1 September 1939 – 5 February 1940	Succeeded by Generalleutnant Ludwig Ritter von Radlmeier
Preceded by none	Commander of XXXXI Armeekorps (mot); 5 February 1940 – 4 October 1941	Succeeded by Generalleutnant Otto-Ernst Ottenbacher
Preceded by none	Commander of Third Panzer Army; 5 October 1941 – 15 August 1944	Succeeded by Generaloberst Erhard Raus
Preceded by Generalfeldmarschall Walter Model	Commander of Army Group Centre; 16 August 1944 – 17 January 1945	Succeeded by Generalfeldmarschall Ferdinand Schörner
