= 3rd Panzer Army =

Military unit of Nazi Germany

- 3. Panzerarmee
- Active: 16 November 1940 – 3 May 1945
- Country: Nazi Germany
- Branch: German Army
- Type: Panzer
- Role: Armoured warfare
- Size: Army
- Engagements: World War II; Operation Barbarossa; Moscow; Velikiye Luki; Memel; Berlin

Mecklenburg: Situation 2 May 1945
Red – Soviet forces, Orange – British forces, Green – U.S. forces, Grey – German forces
Sources: Tieke – p. 447, Allied Situation Map, Ustinow – Map 158
(1) – U.S. 84th Infantry Division, Bold units are 3rd Panzer Army

The 3rd Panzer Army (German: 3. Panzerarmee) was a German armoured formation during World War II, formed from the 3rd Panzer Group on 1 January 1942.

== 3rd Panzer Group ==
The 3rd Panzer Group (German: Panzergruppe 3) was formed on 16 November 1940. It was a constituent part of Army Group Centre and participated in Operation Barbarossa and fought in the Battle of Moscow in late 1941 and early 1942. Later it served in Operation Typhoon, where it was placed under operational control of the Ninth Army. Panzergruppe 3 was retitled the 3rd Panzer Army on 1 January 1942.

=== Orders of battle ===
At the start of Operation Barbarossa the Group consisted of the XXXIX and LVII Army Corps (mot.).

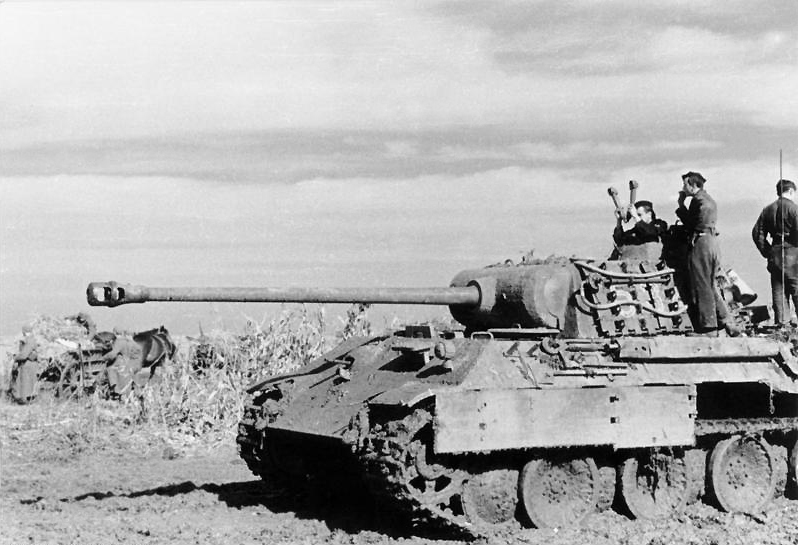
Panther on the Eastern Front, 1944.

=== 2 October 1941 ===
Part of Army Group Centre.

- Commander: Colonel General Hermann Hoth
- Chief of Staff: Colonel Walther von Hünersdorff
- XLI Motorized Corps under General of Panzer Troops Georg-Hans Reinhardt
  - 1.Panzer-Division under Lieutenant General Friedrich Kirchner
  - 36.Infanterie-Division (Mot.) under Lieutenant General Otto-Ernst Ottenbacher
- LVI Motorized Corps under General of Panzer Troops Ferdinand Schaal
  - 6.Panzer-Division under Major General Franz Landgraf
  - 7.Panzer-Division under Major General Hans Freiherr von Funck
  - 14.Infanterie-Division (Mot.) under Major General Friedrich Fürst
- VI Corps under General of Engineers Otto-Wilhelm Förster
  - 6.Infanterie-Division under Lieutenant General Helge Auleb
  - 26.Infanterie-Division under Major General Walter Weiß
  - 110.Infanterie-Division under Lieutenant General Ernst Seifert

3rd Panzer Army was formed by redesignating 3rd Panzer Group on 1 January 1942.

On 19 September 1943, 3rd Panzer Army passed off one of its remaining corps, leaving the formation with VI Army Corps and II Luftwaffe Field Corps.

On 13 December 1943, the army was involved in the defensive against the Red Army's Gorodok offensive, which began what in German parlance was called the "First Winter Battle of Vitebsk" (Erste Winterschlacht von Witebsk). The 1st Baltic Front (Ivan Bagramyan) attacked with four field armies, with a total of 33 rifle divisions and 17 armored formations, east of Vitebsk, with another two field armies, with a total of 23 rifle divisions and 11 armored formations, had attacked in the north and northwest of Vitebsk for the purposes of an encirclement. The 3rd Panzer Army's war diary retrospectively claimed 1,205 tanks disabled for the entire of the First Winter Battle of Vitebsk (13 December 1943 – 17 January 1944), of which 1,114 were claimed as completely destroyed.

Between 3 and 17 February, the Soviet Vitebsk Offensive Operation (in German parlance: "Second Winter Battle of Vitebsk" (Zweite Winterschlacht von Witebsk)) attacked the Vitebsk sector again, which was by now enveloped by the Red Army on three sides. The 1st Baltic Front, supported by 3rd Air Army, attacked with the 4th Shock Army, 11th Guards Army and 43rd Army, while the Western Front, with support by 1st Air Army, joined the offensive with the 5th Army, 33rd Army, and 39th Army. In total, the Red Army forces on the offensive numbered 436,180 men. The direction of the offensive was aimed towards the flanks of Vitebsk's defenses, foregoing a frontal assault in favor of an encirclement. Soviet infantry attacked German defenses repeatedly in densely-packed assaults, recorded by the 3rd Panzer Army's war diary as a numerical 8:1 infantry superiority in the Soviet favor, which reached as high as 16:1 in some sectors. Having exhausted themselves in high casualties, the Soviet forces, with only small territorial gains, attempted a final breakthrough on 16 February 1944, but were again repulsed. After the Second Winter Battle of Vitebsk ended on 17 February 1944, 3rd Panzer Army counted 11,688 combat casualties (2,128 KIA, 1,071 MIA, 8,489 WIA). With an infantry strength of only 19,150 before the battle, these casualty figures were painfully high. Official Soviet casualties of the Vitebsk Offensive Operation (which in the Soviet definition lasted until 13 March, but only saw minor clashes after 17 February) counted 135,012 combat casualties, including 27,639 killed or missing. Soviet infantry had been over-exposed to German defensive fire due to a comparatively low willingness by Soviet officers to commit their armored forces to the battle; the 3rd Panzer Army nonetheless recorded 332 tanks destroyed and another 31 immobilized between 3 and 17 February 1944.

In March 1944, the 3rd Panzer Army took part in the forced assembly and deportation of Russian civilians in the Borisov area. The civilians were deported to Germany for use as forced labor.

During Operation Bagration in July 1944, 3rd Panzer Army became part of the encirclement at Tekino, the Duna and Vitebsk, where it was largely destroyed. Surviving units retreated through Lithuania before reforming a line near Courland, fighting and being defeated during the Battle of Memel in late 1944.

In February 1945 the 3rd Panzer Army was one of the armies that made up the new Army Group Vistula. On 10 March 1945, General Hasso-Eccard von Manteuffel was made the commander of the 3rd Panzer Army, which was assigned to defend the banks of the Oder River, north of the Seelow Heights, thus hampering Soviet access to Western Pomerania and Berlin. They then faced an overwhelming Soviet attack launched by General Rokossovsky's 2nd Belorussian Front during the Battle of Berlin. On 25 April the Soviets broke through 3rd Panzer Army's line around the bridgehead south of Stettin and crossed the Randow Swamp.

Following the defeat at Stettin, 3rd Panzer Army was forced to retreat into the region of Mecklenburg – the headquarters of 3rd Panzer Army. Manteuffel negotiated with British generals including Field Marshal Bernard Montgomery at Hagenow on 3 May 1945 so that he with 300,000 German soldiers could surrender to the British rather than Soviet forces.

== Commanders ==
| No. | Portrait | Commander | Took office | Left office | Time in office |
|---|---|---|---|---|---|
| 1 | Hermann Hoth | Generaloberst; Hermann Hoth (1885–1971) | 16 November 1940 | 5 October 1941 | 324 days |
| 2 | Georg-Hans Reinhardt | Generaloberst; Georg-Hans Reinhardt (1887–1963) | 5 October 1941 | 15 August 1944 | 2 years, 315 days |
| 3 | Erhard Raus | Generaloberst; Erhard Raus (1889–1956) | 16 August 1944 | 10 March 1945 | 206 days |
| 4 | Hasso von Manteuffel | General der Panzertruppe; Hasso von Manteuffel (1897–1978) | 11 March 1945 | 3 May 1945 | 53 days |
