= 166th Rifle Division =

- Active: I Formation: September 1939 – December 1941 II Formation: January 1942 – 1946
- Country: Soviet Union
- Branch: Red Army
- Type: Infantry
- Engagements: World War II: Battle of Smolensk (1941); Battle of Moscow; Battle of Demyansk (1943); Battle of Kursk; Belgorod-Kharkov Offensive Operation; Operation Bagration; Riga Offensive (1944); Battle of Memel
- Decorations: Order of the Red Banner (2nd formation)

The 166th Rifle Division was an infantry division of the Soviet Union's Red Army that fought in World War II, formed twice. The division's first formation was formed in 1939 and wiped out in the Vyazma Pocket in October 1941. In January 1942, the division reformed. It fought in the Battle of Demyansk, the Battle of Kursk, Belgorod-Khar'kov Offensive Operation, Vitebsk–Orsha Offensive, Polotsk Offensive, Šiauliai Offensive, Riga Offensive and the Battle of Memel. It was awarded the Order of the Red Banner.

== History ==
=== First formation ===
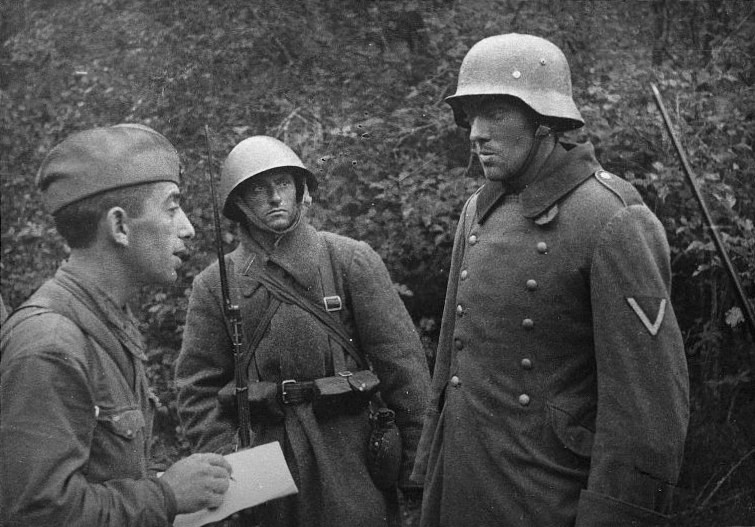
Translator for division headquarters Junior Lieutenant Solomon Grigoryevich Makovsky (left) questions a captured German scout, August 1941. Makovsky was killed in January 1942 while trying to return to Soviet lines after escaping the Vyazma pocket

The 166th Rifle Division was formed at Tomsk in September 1939. It was commanded by Colonel Alexey Holzinev. On 22 June 1941, the division was in its summer quarters south of Yurga. The division hastily moved to Tomsk and was reequipped with new uniforms, weapons and ammunition. On 26 June, the first train of the division left for Smolensk. The division became part of the 24th Army and by mid-July was defending the Bely-Dorogobuzh-Yelnya area. On 19 July, two battalions of the 517th Rifle Regiment and the 499th Artillery Regiment engaged in battle with German troops at Lake Shchuchye. Days later, Soviet troops began counterattacks in the Smolensk area. The division was initially part of Group Khomenko but was transferred to Group Kalinin on 22 July. Along with the 91st Rifle Division, the 166th was to attack towards Dukhovshchina. On 24 July, it reached Lelimovo but was forced to withdraw to the area between Pakikino and Pochinok.

The division continued to attack and in early August captured Gutarovo, only 32 kilometers from Yartsevo.On 11 August, the 517th and 735th Rifle Regiments broke through German defences and provided a corridor for Ivan Boldin's group to escape from its encirclement. Colonel Mikhail Dodonov became the division commander on 31 August. In late September, the depleted division was moved to the second echelon to receive replacements. On 2 October, the German troops began Operation Typhoon and the division was forced to take up positions at Kholm-Zhirkovsky. On 4 October, Western Front decided to withdraw from the Gzhatsk defensive line, but the division could not retreat. On 7 October, the division was encircled in the Vyazma Pocket. Only 517 soldiers from the division escaped from the encirclement. A number of soldiers from the division became partisans in the area. The division was officially disbanded on 27 December 1941.

Poirer and Connor, in their Red Army Order of Battle in the Great Patriotic War, 1985, write that it was established at Tomsk prior to June 1941. Wiped out Vyazma Oct 1941.

=== Second formation ===
The second formation of the division was redesignated from the 437th Rifle Division on 16 January 1942 at Chebarkul in the Ural Military District. The 437th began forming in early December under the command of Major General Fyodor Shchekotsky. The division was mostly composed of soldiers from Chelyabinsk and Sverdlovsk Oblasts, Bashkortostan and Kazakhstan. Between 29 January and 16 February 1942, the division was transported to Lyubim. The division remained there in the Reserve of the Supreme High Command until 15 April, when it departed for the Ostashkov region, where it joined the 53rd Army of the Northwestern Front. The division held defensive positions near Ostashkov until February 1943. Between 4 and 11 February 1943 the division briefly transferred to the 1st Shock Army of the front. Returning to the 53rd Army on 11 February, the 166th fought in the Demyansk offensive. During the offensive, Shchekotsky was relieved of command by front commander Semyon Timoshenko for "poor leadership of the division in combat from 17 to 19 February." He was replaced by Colonel Bronislav Poltorzhitsky as the Demyansk offensive continued. On 9 March the division reached the line of Lipno and Selyakha, the first unit of the 53rd Army to break through the strong German defenses and forced German troops to retreat towards the Lovat.

The division was withdrawn to the front reserve on 3 April, then in the region of Peno joined the 27th Army of the Stavka reserve. At the end of May the division was relocated with the army to the region of Lebedyan, where the army became part of the Steppe Military District. From 9 July it fought in the Battle of Kursk and the Belgorod–Kharkov offensive operation. The units of the 166th were especially distinguished in the battles for Akhtyrka. Reaching the eastern outskirts of the city, on 18 August the division was attacked by strong German tank forces, supported by aviation. Suffering heavy losses, the division steadfastly continued to hold its positions. In repulsing the attack the division destroyed up to 30 tanks. In the fighting, while repulsing the German tank attack, Poltorzhitsky was heavily wounded and evacuated to a hospital. In September the division transferred to the 20th Guards Rifle Corps of the 4th Guards Army and pursued retreating German troops. At the end of September the 166th was withdrawn to the Stavka reserve for rebuilding, where it became part of the 6th Guards Army, At the beginning of November the division was relocated to the Nevel region, where it fought in the Nevel Offensive against German troops south of the city, as part of the 60th Rifle Corps of the 4th Shock Army of the 1st Baltic Front.

Colonel Anisim Svetlyakov, who had served as the deputy commander of the 166th since December 1942, took command of the division on 23 November, while it participated in offensive operations as part of the 2nd Guards Rifle Corps with the goal of cutting the Vitebsk–Polotsk railroad. In February 1944 the division and corps conducted a 120 kilometer march to the Idritsa region, where they became part of the 6th Guards Army. With the latter the 166th fought in the Vitebsk–Orsha offensive, the Polotsk offensive, and the Šiauliai offensive. In total, from 22 June to 8 August the division advanced 370 kilometers in battle and liberated 480 fortified points, including the cities of Braslav and Subate. From September 1944 the division fought as part of the 4th Shock and 6th Guards Armies of the 1st Baltic Front in the Riga offensive and the Memel Offensive. Major General Svetlyakov was wounded and evacuated to a hospital on 17 October during the Memel offensive. He was replaced by Colonel Vasily Gnedin, who led the division in the encirclement of the Courland Pocket. During the fighting Gnedin was seriously wounded and evacuated to a hospital in December. Svetlyakov returned to command of the division on 15 December. In February and March the division as part of the 22nd and 2nd Guards Rifle Corps of the 6th Guards Army of the 2nd Baltic Front was on the defensive. At the end of March the division began advancing along the Mitava–Libava railroad, and on 30 March the army became part of the Courland Group of Forces of the Leningrad Front.

With 6th Guards Army of the Kurland Group (Leningrad Front) May 1945.

The division was stationed at Alytus. After the war, it appears to have been disbanded while serving with the 2nd Guards Rifle Corps, 6th Guards Army, Baltic Military District, in 1946.

6th Guards Army headquarters moved from Šiauliai to Riga in February 1946.

== Composition ==
The division's first formation included the following units.

- 423rd Rifle Regiment
- 517th Rifle Regiment
- 735th Rifle Regiment
- 359th Artillery Regiment
- 499th Howitzer Artillery Regiment
- 205th Separate Anti-Tank Battalion
- 177th Anti-Aircraft Artillery Battalion
- 191st Reconnaissance Company
- 231st Sapper Battalion
- 195th Separate Communications Battalion
- 215th Medical Battalion
- 191st Separate Chemical Defence Company
- 106th Motor Transport Battalion
- 172nd Field Mobile Bakery
- 131st Field Post Office
- 251st Field Ticket Office of the State Bank

The division's second formation included the following units.

- 423rd Rifle Regiment
- 517th Rifle Regiment
- 735th Rifle Regiment
- 359th Artillery Regiment
- 205th Separate Anti-Tank Battalion
- 191st Reconnaissance Company
- 231st Sapper Battalion
- 195th Separate Communications Battalion (later 888th Separate Communications Company)
- 215th Medical Battalion
- 534th Separate Chemical Defence Company
- 72nd Motor Transport Company
- 450th Field Bakery
- 915th Divisional Veterinary Hospital
- 1671st Field Post Office
- 1092nd Field Ticket Office of the State Bank
