= Kaunas offensive =

- Part of Operation Bagration
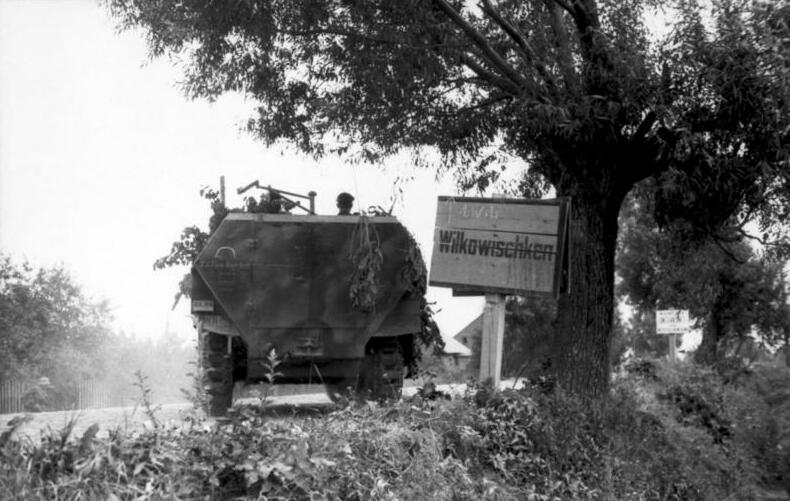
- Wehrmacht armored personnel carrier in Vilkaviškis during the Kaunas offensive
Date	July 28 – August 28, 1944
Location	Kaunas area, Lithuania 54°55′N 24°00′E
Result	Soviet victory

Belligerents
(Nazi Germany) Germany	Soviet Union

Commanders and leaders
(Nazi Germany) Walter Model (Army Group Centre)	(Soviet Union) Ivan Chernyakhovsky (3rd Belorussian Front)

The Kaunas offensive (Russian: Каунасская наступательная операция) was part of the third phase of the Byelorussian strategic offensive of the Red Army in summer 1944, commonly known as Operation Bagration. The Kaunas offensive was executed by the 3rd Belorussian Front on July 28 – August 28, 1944, with the aim of destroying the German concentration on the western bank of the Neman river, the occupation of Kaunas, and reaching the boundaries of East Prussia.

== Planning ==
After completing the Vilnius offensive operation, the troops of the 3rd Belorussian Front (the 11th Guards, 5th, 31st, 33rd, 39th Armies, the 5th Guards Tank Army and 1st Air Army) were engaged in intense fighting with German forces on the approaches to the Neman river during the second half of July, and were preparing for the continuation of the offensive. They were resisted by formations and units of the Third Panzer and Fourth Armies of the German Army Group Centre, under the command of Field-Marshal Walter Model. Towards the end of July, German units concentrated in the direction of Kaunas, according to Soviet estimates, included elements of 10 infantry and 2 tank divisions, 2 infantry brigades and 30 separate regiments and battalions.

Stavka assigned to the forces of the Front the mission of pressing home the attack on the Kaunas axis not later than 1–2 August, through assaults by the 39th Army together with the 5th Guards Tank Army from the north, and the 5th and 33rd Armies from the south to occupy Kaunas – the most important defensive position on the approaches to East Prussia. The plan called for the Red Army troops to advance to the borders of East Prussia by the 10 August and assume a defensive configuration in preparation for advancing into East Prussia.

As with the parallel defence against the Belostock offensive to the south, Model concentrated on a holding and delaying action using the few units available to him. The German Order of Battle for mid-July showed units from a large number of divisions in the area, but many of these were fragments that had escaped from the encirclement of the bulk of Army Group Centre in the previous phases of Operation Bagration; see deployments below.

== Deployments ==
=== Wehrmacht ===
- Third Panzer Army (Colonel-General Georg-Hans Reinhardt)
  - Korpsabteilung H (remnants of 95th, 197th and 256th Infantry Divisions that had escaped the previous phase of Operation Bagration)
  - Sperr-Gruppe "von Rothkirch"
  - XXVI Corps (General Gerhard Matzky)
    - 201st Sicherungs Division
    - Elements of the 6th Panzer Division
    - 69th Infantry Division
    - Elements of the 196th Infantry Division
  - IX Corps (remnants) (General Rolf Wuthmann)
    - Remnants of the 212th Infantry Division
    - Remnants of the 252nd Infantry Division
    - PanzerGrenadier Brigade "von Werthern"
- Northern wing of Fourth Army (General Kurt von Tippelskirch to 18 July, then General Friedrich Hoßbach)
  - XXXIX Panzer Corps (reconstructed) (General Dietrich von Saucken)
    - 7th Panzer Division
    - Elements of the 170th and 131st Infantry Divisions

=== Red Army ===
- 3rd Belorussian Front (General Ivan Chernyakhovsky)
  - 11th Guards Army (General Kuzma Galitsky)
  - 5th Army (Colonel general Nikolay Krylov)
  - 33rd Army (Lieutenant-General Vasily Kryuchenkin)
  - 39th Army (Lieutenant-General Ivan Lyudnikov)
  - 31st Army
  - 5th Guards Tank Army (General Pavel Rotmistrov)
  - 1st Air Army

== The offensive ==
Having suffered mightily at the hands of Operation Bagration, 3rd Panzer Army, continued its desperate retreat toward the west. In mid-July, the Germans could only count on a few infantry divisions and over-worked panzer divisions. But by the 16th of July Raus had managed to form a somewhat coherent line of defense just east of Kaunas proper. Walter Model did give some reserves and replacements to the Panzer Army, but considering the extent of the losses in the past weeks, no unit at the front could be considered fully manned or equipped. Unfortunately for the Germans, 2nd Guards Army, part of 1st Baltic front, had worked its way behind their defenses. Between the 16th and 25th, German kampfgruppen managed to hold the Soviets at bay east of the city. The Neman river line defenses were hastily prepared and rarely had the sufficient manpower to withstand a concentrated Russian attack.

On 28 July the forces of the Front went over to the offensive, and by the end of 29 July they had advanced 5–17 km. By July 30 the German resistance on the approaches to the Nemunas was broken. In the 33rd Army sector, the 2nd Guards Tank Corps was introduced into the breakthrough: their rapid advance to Vilkaviškis threatened the German forces before Kaunas with encirclement and the Germans were forced to retreat.

Using the success of the Tank Corps, the troops of the 33rd Army entered and secured Vilkaviškis and the railway station of Mariampolė on 31 July. Troops of the 5th Army broke into Kaunas and on the morning of 1 August took control of it. Towards the beginning of August the forces of the Front advanced up to 50 km and subsequently enlarged the breakthrough to 230 km, occupying more than 900 villages, townships, towns and small cities.

During August, Raus's Third Panzer Army was reinforced and mounted a counter-offensive on the front's northern flank in Operation Doppelkopf. German troops also delivered a series of strong counter-attacks south-west and west of Kaunas. Having countered these, the 3rd Belorussian Front's troops moved a further 30–50 km and advanced towards deliberately prepared German fortified positions on the line east of Raseiniai and Kybartai - Suwałki. From 29 August on the orders of Stavka, the Front went over to the defensive. As a result of the Kaunas operation the forces of the 3rd Belorussian Front reached the eastern borders of East Prussia.
