= Gumbinnen Operation =

1944 Soviet offensive on the Eastern Front of World War II

- Part of Eastern Front of World War II
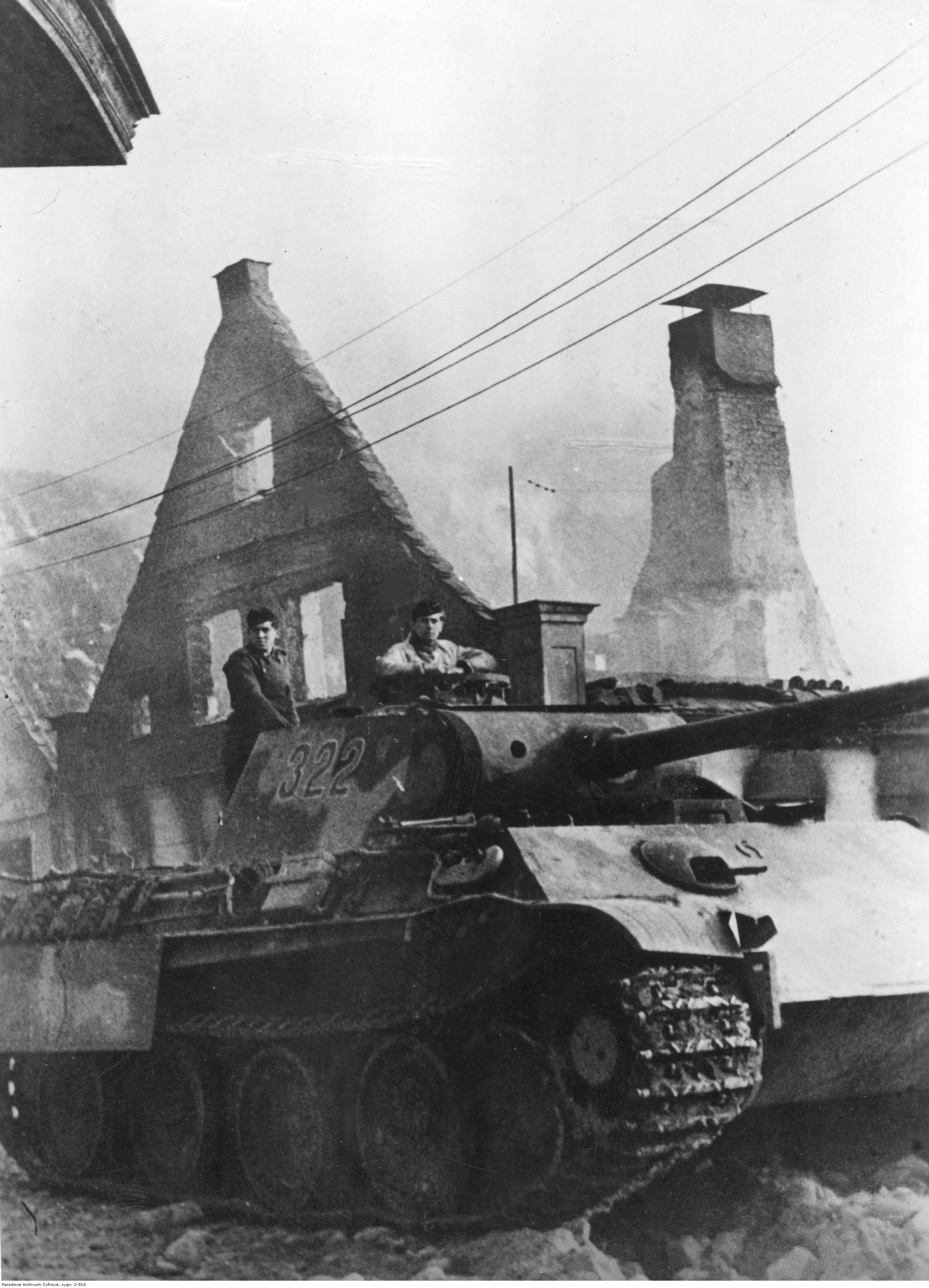
- German Panther tank in Goldap, November 1944
Date	16–30 October 1944
Location	East Prussia, Germany
Result	German victory

Belligerents
Germany	Soviet Union

Commanders and leaders
(Nazi Germany) Georg-Hans Reinhardt; (Nazi Germany) Friedrich Hoßbach; (Nazi Germany) Erhard Raus	(Soviet Union) Ivan Chernyakhovsky; (Soviet Union) Kuzma Galitsky; (Soviet Union) Pyotr Shafranov; (Soviet Union) Alexander Luchinsky; (Soviet Union) Ivan Lyudnikov; (Soviet Union) Vasily Glagolev; (Soviet Union) Timofey Khryukin

Units involved
(Nazi Germany) Army Group Centre: 4th Army; 3rd Panzer Army	(Soviet Union) 3rd Belorussian Front: 11th Guards Army; 5th Army; 28th Army; 39th Army; 31st Army; 1st Air Army

Strength
318 tanks, assault guns and tank destroyers	377,300 men

Casualties and losses
16,236 men 6,801 killed or missing 9,435 wounded 115 tanks and assault guns destroyed	79,527 men 16,819 killed or missing 62,708 wounded 914 tanks and assault guns destroyed

The Gumbinnen Operation, also known as the Goldap Operation (or Goldap-Gumbinnen Operation, Russian: Гумбиннен-Гольдапская наступательная операция), was a Soviet offensive on the Eastern Front late in 1944, in which forces of the 3rd Belorussian Front attempted to penetrate the borders of East Prussia.

== Planning ==
The operation was planned as a result of the success of the Memel Offensive Operation to the north. The troops of the 1st Baltic and 3rd Belorussian Fronts had succeeded in pushing the Third Panzer Army back to the East Prussian border, surrounding the city of Memel and reaching the shore of the Curonian Lagoon. Stavka permitted Chernyakhovsky to further exploit this success by attacking along the Gumbinnen – Insterburg – Königsberg (now Kaliningrad) axis deep into East Prussia.

Chernyakhovsky's plan involved using the 11th Guards and 5th Armies to break open the German defensive lines, before pushing through exploitation forces from the 2nd Guards Tank Corps and 28th Army. The 31st and 39th Armies would advance on the flanks of the main force.

The opposing German forces, from the Third Panzer and Fourth Armies, were aided by the presence of substantial fortifications, and had been heavily reinforced.

== Deployments ==
=== Wehrmacht ===
- Army Group Centre (Colonel General Georg-Hans Reinhardt)
  - Southern flank of Third Panzer Army (Colonel General Erhard Raus)
    - XXXX Panzer Corps (General Sigfrid Henrici)
    - IX Corps (General Rolf Wuthmann)
  - Northern flank of Fourth Army (General of the Infantry Friedrich Hoßbach)
    - XXVII Corps (General Maximilian Felzmann)
    - XXXXI Panzer Corps (General Helmuth Weidling)
    - Fallschirm-Panzerkorps Hermann Göring (Lieutenant General Wilhelm Schmalz)
    - VI Corps (General Horst Großmann)

=== Red Army ===
- 3rd Belorussian Front (General Ivan Chernyakhovsky)
  - 11th Guards Army (Colonel General Kuzma Galitsky)
    - 2nd Guards Tank Corps (Major General Alexei Burdeinei)
  - 5th Army (Lieutenant General Pyotr Shafranov for Colonel General Nikolay Krylov)
  - 28th Army (Lieutenant General Alexander Luchinsky)
  - 39th Army (Lieutenant General Ivan Lyudnikov)
  - 31st Army (Colonel General Vasily Glagolev)
  - 1st Air Army (Colonel General of Aviation Timofey Khryukin)

== Offensive ==
On 16 October, the 5th and 11th Guards Armies went onto the offensive and initially penetrated some 11 km into the German defensive belt. The flanking armies commenced operations the next day, when units of the 11th Guards Army had already crossed the East Prussian border.

German troops on the outskirts of Gołdap, retaken on 3 November 1944

The Soviet troops ran into extremely strong resistance. It took them four days to penetrate the initial tactical defenses, and the second defense line was so strong that Chernyakhovsky was compelled to commit the 2nd Guards Tank Corps to break it. Casualties were extremely heavy.

On 20 October, the second line was ruptured by the 11th Guards Army and 2nd Guards Tank Corps east of Gumbinnen, defended by the guns of the 18th Anti-Aircraft Division and the Fallschirm-Panzerdivision Hermann Göring, which had been redeployed in the area to counter the Soviet advance. On 21 October, the Soviet reserve, the 28th Army, was committed, but the offensive in the north was fought to a standstill in the region of Ebenrode because of effective German counterattacks.

Gumbinnen was taken by 22 October but was retaken by German forces on 24 October after the Germans had committed the 5th Panzer Division, and Heavy Panzer Detachment 505 (equipped with Tiger IIs). Also, Nemmersdorf, on the banks of the Angrapa River, was taken by units of the 2nd Guards Tank Corps on 21 October but was retaken by German forces on 23 October.

Units of 11th Guards Army found themselves cut off in the area of Großwaltersdorf and were involved in intense fighting. In the meantime, the Germans had pressed more reserves, including the 102nd Panzer and Führer Grenadier Brigades into counterattacks at Goldap, on the southern sector of the Soviet penetration. The town was retaken on 25 October.

The Soviet attacks continued until 27 October, as the flanking armies sought to close up to the 11th Guards Army.

There was more fighting in the operation's immediate aftermath: on 28 October, the 31st Army retook Gołdap in a surprise attack. The town was again taken by the 5th Panzer Division, which was redeployed from the Gumbinnen area on 3 November.

== See also ==
- East Prussian Offensive, in which the Front renewed its attack into East Prussia the following January, this time successfully.

== Bibliography ==
- Dieckert, K. and Großmann, H. Der Kampf um Ostpreußen, Gräfe und Unzer Verlag, München, 1960
- Frieser, Karl-Heinz; Schmider, Klaus; Schönherr, Klaus; Schreiber, Gerhard; Ungváry, Kristián; Wegner, Bernd (2007). Die Ostfront 1943/44 – Der Krieg im Osten und an den Nebenfronten [The Eastern Front 1943–1944: The War in the East and on the Neighbouring Fronts] (in German). Vol. VIII. München: Deutsche Verlags-Anstalt. ISBN 978-3-421-06235-2.
- Glantz, D. The Failures of Historiography: Forgotten Battles of the Soviet-German War, https://web.archive.org/web/20161216063344/http://fmso.leavenworth.army.mil/documents/failures.htm
- Zeidler, Manfred (1996). Kriegsende im Osten – Die Rote Armee und die Besetzung Deutschlands östlich von Oder und Neiße 1944/45 [End of War in the East - The Red Army and the Occupation of Germany east of Oder and Neisse 1944/45] (in German). Munich: Oldenbourg. ISBN 3-486-56187-1.
