= Polotsk offensive =

- Part of Operation Bagration
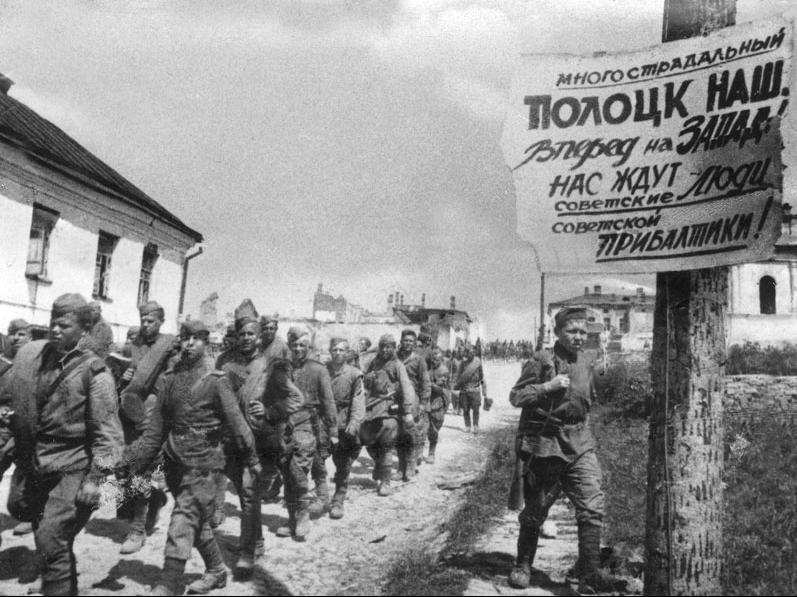
- Soviet soldiers at Polotsk
Date	June 29, 1944 – July 4, 1944
Location	Belorussian SSR
Result	Soviet Victory

Belligerents
Germany	Soviet Union

Commanders and leaders
(Nazi Germany) Georg-Hans Reinhardt (Third Panzer Army) (Nazi Germany) Rolf Wuthmann (IX Corps)	(Soviet Union) Hovhannes Bagramyan (1st Baltic Front)

Strength
?	?

Casualties and losses
37,000 dead, 7,000 POW (Soviet est)	?

The Polotsk offensive (Russian: Полоцкая наступательная операция) was part of the second phase of the Belorussian strategic offensive of the Red Army in summer 1944, commonly known as Operation Bagration.

The Soviet First Baltic Front successfully pursued the retreating remnants of the German Third Panzer Army back towards Polotsk, which was reached by 1 July. German forces attempted to organise a defense using rear-area support units and several divisions hurriedly transferred from Army Group North.

Units of the 1st Baltic Front's 4th Shock Army and 6th Guards Army fought their way into the city over the next few days, and successfully cleared it of German forces by 4 July.

== Planning ==
=== Operational goals ===
The operational goals were two fold:

- To capture the city of Polotsk.
- To protect the northern flank of forces engaged in the parallel Minsk offensive operation, preventing a possible counter-attack from the German forces of Army Group North.

== Deployments ==
=== Wehrmacht ===
- Remnants of Third Panzer Army (Colonel-General Georg-Hans Reinhardt)
  - IX Corps (General Rolf Wuthmann)
  - Remnants of VI Corps
  - Reserve: 201st Security Division, 221st Security Division
- Elements of Sixteenth Army of Army Group North

The above units were under the overall command of Army Group Centre (Field-Marshal Walter Model).

=== Red Army ===
- 1st Baltic Front (General Hovhannes Bagramyan)
  - 4th Shock Army
  - 6th Guards Army
  - 43rd Army
  - 3rd Air Army

== The offensive ==
The 1st Baltic Front continued to extend its offensive westwards from June 30, pushing the shattered remnants of Third Panzer Army's IX Corps back towards Polotsk. Two of the 6th Guards Army's rifle corps, the 103rd and 23rd Guards, had advanced some 18 km by the end of the day against some German counter-attacks, while the 4th Shock Army had reached the Sosnitsa River. The Front's tank corps, in the meantime, successfully cut the Molodechno - Polotsk rail line, despite advancing a smaller distance than planned due to being held up at the Ulla crossings.

With the IX Corps having suffered heavy losses, the LIII Corps effectively wiped out in the encirclement of Vitebsk a few days earlier and the VI Corps largely destroyed south and east of Vitebsk, Colonel-General Reinhardt committed his rear-area security divisions into the lines. In response to a request from Field-Marshal Model, the 290th and 81st Infantry Divisions were hurriedly shifted from Army Group North to shore up the collapsing defences on the approaches to Polotsk. In the south of the sector, the remnants of IX Corps (the 252nd Infantry Division and Korpsabteilung D) and of the former VI Corps (mainly from the 95th Infantry Division), continued to offer weak resistance, but the Soviet advance, and German retreat, was rapid. A survivor from the 252nd Infantry Division described the experience as "a virtual race westwards, trying to outpace the Soviet units advancing as fast as their logistics would allow them. The Division travelled nearly 500 kilometres".

Bagramyan's planning envisaged the launch of a final offensive against Polotsk, an important communications and transport centre, on July 1, taking the city by evening. The attack was launched that morning by the 4th Shock Army's 100th and 83rd Rifle Corps in co-ordination with elements of the 6th Guards Army. German resistance was strong, and Soviet units were only able to penetrate the town's defences by the next day. On July 2, Soviet forces were involved in fierce fighting to capture the main railway bridge over the Dvina, which formed the main link between the German forces in the north and south of the city; the bridge was eventually taken by the 156th Guards Rifle Regiment. There were intense street battles until the evening of July 4, after which the surviving German forces withdrew.
