= Vitebsk–Orsha offensive =

1944 offensive during World War II

- Part of Operation Bagration
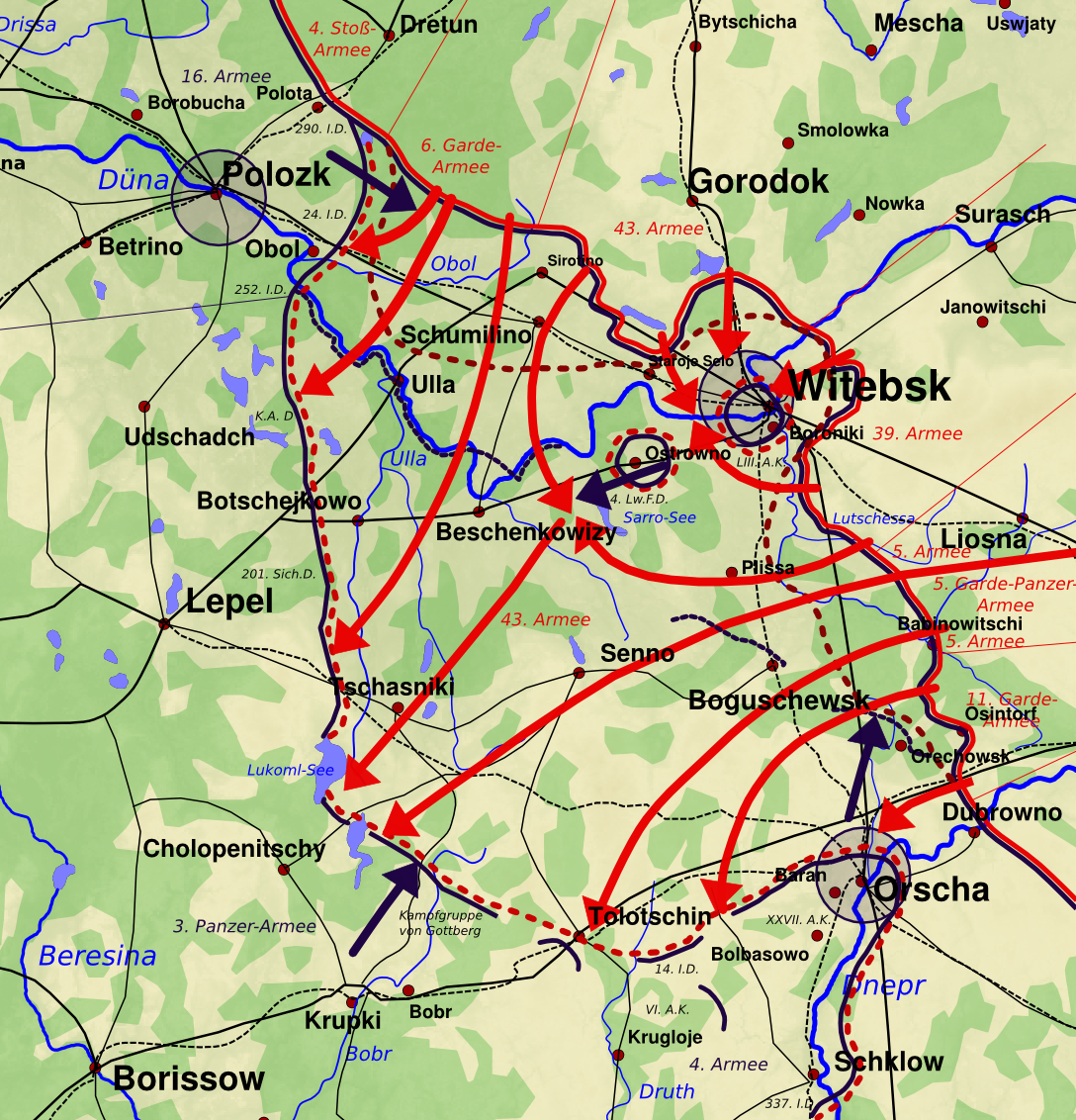
Date	23–28 June 1944
Location	Belorussian SSR 55.2°N 30.2°E
Result	Soviet victory

Belligerents
Germany	Soviet Union

Commanders and leaders
Georg-Hans Reinhardt (Third Panzer Army); Kurt von Tippelskirch (Fourth Army); Alfons Hitter (surrendered) (206th Division)	Ivan Bagramyan (1st Baltic Front); Ivan Chernyakhovsky (3rd Belorussian Front)

Strength
165,000 men	359,000 men

Casualties and losses
41,700 killed 126 tanks and assault guns destroyed 1,840 motor vehicles 17,800 taken prisoner	11,014 killed 318 tanks destroyed 113 aircraft shot down

The Vitebsk–Orsha offensive (Russian: Витебско-Оршанская наступательная операция) was part of the Belorussian strategic offensive of the Red Army in summer 1944, commonly known as Operation Bagration. During the offensive, Soviet troops captured Vitebsk and Orsha. A Soviet breakthrough during the offensive helped achieve the encirclement of German troops in the subsequent Minsk offensive.

== Planning ==
The immediate goals of the Soviet offensive were:

- Break through the defences of 3rd Panzer Army to the north and south of Vitebsk and encircle the city, which occupied a salient in the German lines.
- Break through the heavily fortified area around the main Moscow-Minsk highway and liberate the town of Orsha.
- Commit motorised / cavalry exploitation forces through the gap opened once the highway had been cleared, opening the way for the encirclement of the German 4th Army in the Minsk offensive operation.

Soviet intelligence had revealed the depth of the German defences on the Moscow–Minsk highway near Orsha. As a result, the attack of Galitsky's 11th Guards Army in this sector was to be preceded by specialised engineer units; mine rolling PT-34 tanks of the 116th Separate Engineering Tank Regiment were committed along with assault engineer companies and assault gun regiments in several waves against the fortified and mined positions of the 78th Sturm Division.

== Deployments ==
=== Wehrmacht ===
- Third Panzer Army (Colonel-General Georg-Hans Reinhardt)
  - IX Corps (General Rolf Wuthmann)
  - LIII Corps (General Friedrich Gollwitzer)
  - VI Corps (General Georg Pfeiffer)
- Northern flank of Fourth Army (General Kurt von Tippelskirch)
  - XXVII Corps (General Paul Völckers)
- Reserve: 14th Infantry Division, 286th Security Division

The cities of Vitebsk and Orsha had been declared Fester Platz – fortified towns to be held at all costs – under the command of Gollwitzer (Vitebsk) and General Traut of the XXVII Corps's 78th Sturm Division (Orsha).

The above units were under the overall command of Army Group Centre (Field-Marshal Ernst Busch).

=== Red Army ===
- 1st Baltic Front (General Hovhannes Bagramyan)
  - 4th Shock Army
  - 6th Guards Army
  - 43rd Army
  - 3rd Air Army
- 3rd Belorussian Front (General Ivan Chernyakhovsky)
  - 11th Guards Army (General Kuzma Galitsky)
  - 5th Army
  - 39th Army
  - 31st Army
  - 5th Guards Tank Army (General Pavel Rotmistrov)
  - 1st Air Army

Marshal Aleksandr Vasilevsky was appointed to coordinate the operations of the two Fronts involved.

== The offensive ==
=== Vitebsk ===
Army Group Centre's northern flank was defended by the Third Panzer Army under the command of Georg-Hans Reinhardt; the lines ran through marshy terrain in the north, through a salient round the city of Vitebsk, to a sector north of the main Moscow–Minsk road, held by the Fourth Army. It was opposed by the 1st Baltic Front of Hovhannes Bagramyan, and Chernyakhovsky's 3rd Belorussian Front, who were given the task of breaking through the defences to the north and south of Vitebsk and cutting off the salient.

It was in this sector that Soviet forces had their greatest initial gains. The Soviet 43rd Army broke the defences of the German IX Corps, to the north of Vitebsk, within hours, pushing towards the Dvina river. South of the city, the VI Corps' 299th and 197th Infantry Divisions were overrun and consumed by an overwhelming Soviet assault, with a particularly effective breakthrough by the 5th Army at the junction of the 299th and 256th Infantry Divisions' sectors. By 24 June, the German position in Vitebsk itself, held by the central LIII Corps of four divisions, was already serious, as Soviet forces were clearly intending to encircle the city, but no reserves were available to shore up the collapsing defences, and requests to withdraw German troops to the second defense lines, the 'Tiger' line, were denied by the Oberkommando des Heeres.

By 25 June Third Panzer Army was disintegrating. In the north, IX Corps had been broken and pushed over the Dvina, blowing the bridges during its retreat. In the south much of the VI Corps had been annihilated, and its southernmost divisions (the 299th and 256th Infantry Divisions) had become separated from the remainder of Third Panzer Army by heavy attacks around Bogushevsk, where they attempted to make a final stand in the 'Hessen' line, the third defence zone. The Soviet 43rd and 39th Armies were now converging behind Vitebsk, trapping the entire LIII Corps. LIII Corps's commander, Friedrich Gollwitzer, had transferred the 4th Luftwaffe Field Division south-west of the city in order to spearhead a breakout, while the 246th Infantry Division attempted to hold open the Dvina crossings. OKH however, denied all requests for complete evacuation: the 206th Infantry Division was ordered to stay in the city and fight to the last man.

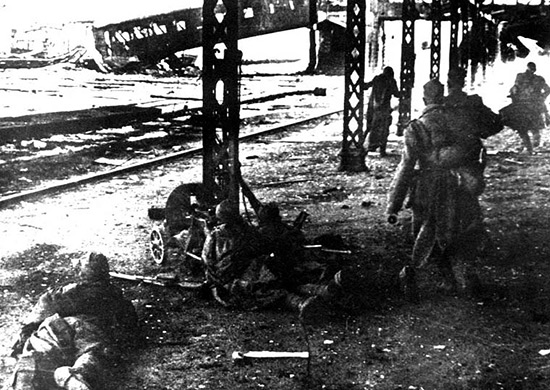
Troops of the 158th Rifle Division fighting near the Vitebsk railway station during the assault on the city

Soviet plans in this sector met with overwhelming success. The 4th Luftwaffe Field Division was cut off and destroyed by the 39th Army on the evening of 25 June, and by the next day the 246th Infantry and 6th Luftwaffe Field Divisions, fighting their way along the road from Vitebsk, had also been encircled. Hitler insisted that a staff officer be parachuted into Vitebsk to remind Gollwitzer that the trapped 206th Infantry Division should not withdraw; Third Panzer Army's commander, Reinhardt, was only able to get this decision reversed by insisting on being parachuted in himself if Hitler continued to order it. By the evening Soviet forces were fighting their way into the city and Gollwitzer finally ordered the garrison to withdraw too, in defiance of the Supreme High Command of the German Army orders.

By 27 June LIII Corps had been dispersed, its 30,000 men being almost all killed or taken prisoner; a group of several thousand from the 4th Luftwaffe Field Division initially managed to break out, but was liquidated in the forests west of Vitebsk. The remnants of IX Corps were retreating to the west, falling back on Polotsk with the 6th Guards Army in pursuit: VI Corps was also largely destroyed. Third Panzer Army had been effectively shattered within days, and Vitebsk liberated: even more significantly, a huge gap had been torn in the German lines to the north of Fourth Army in the former VI Corps sector.

=== Orsha ===
The central sector of Soviet operations was against the long front of Fourth Army, which was under the overall command of Kurt von Tippelskirch. Soviet plans envisaged the bulk of it, the XXXIX Panzer Corps and XII Corps, being encircled while pinned down by attacks from the 2nd Belorussian Front in the parallel Mogilev offensive operation. By far the most important Soviet objective, however, was immediately to the north: the main Moscow–Minsk road and the town of Orsha, which the southern wing of Chernyakhovsky's 3rd Belorussian Front was ordered to take. A breakthrough in this area, against General Paul Völckers' XXVII Corps, would form the northern 'pincer' of the encirclement aimed at destroying Fourth Army. The Minsk road was protected by extensive defensive works manned by the 78th Sturm Division, a specially reinforced unit with extra artillery and assault gun support. Orsha itself had been designated a Fester Platz or strongpoint under 78th Sturm Division's commander, with the 25th Panzergrenadier Division holding the lines to the south. As a result of the strong defenses in this sector, Soviet plans included the commitment of heavily armed engineer units to assist in a breakthrough.

Galitsky's 11th Guards Army attacked towards Orsha on 23 June but initially made little headway. By the next day, the Soviet 1st Guards Rifle Division was able to break through the German lines in a marshy, thinly-held area to the north of the 78th Sturm Division, which was ordered back to the 'Hessen' line, the third defence zone. It was now struggling to maintain contact with the 25th Panzergrenadier Division to the south. Chernyakhovsky, encouraged by the 1st Guards Rifle Division's progress, pushed a mixed cavalry / mechanised exploitation force into the breach in the German lines. On 25 June, the German defences began to rupture; a counter-attack at Orekhovsk failed.

Völckers's position was further threatened by the near-collapse of the Third Panzer Army's VI Corps, immediately to the north. At 11:20 on 25 June the VI Corps, which had been cut off from its parent formation, was reassigned to Fourth Army. Part of its reserve, the 14th Infantry Division, was brought up to try to slow the Soviet advance north of Orsha. By midnight, however, the 11th Guards Army had shattered the remnant of VI Corps in the 'Hessen' line, and the 78th Sturm Division's situation was becoming untenable: 26 June saw the German forces in retreat. Soviet tank forces of the 2nd Guards Tank Corps were able to push up the road towards Minsk at speed, with a subsidiary force breaking off to encircle Orsha, which was liberated on the evening of 26 June. The main exploitation force, Pavel Rotmistrov's 5th Guards Tank Army, was then committed through the gap torn in the German lines. VI Corps finally crumbled completely, its rear elements falling back towards Borisov in disarray: its commander, General Georg Pfeiffer, was killed on 28 June after losing contact with his divisions. Völckers was ordered to hold fast, but lacked the necessary resources despite shifting his 260th Infantry Division northwards and moving the 286th Security Division into the lines.

The operation effectively ceased with the arrival of 5th Guards Tank Army's forward units at the Berezina on 28 June.

== Consequences ==
In terms of its objectives within the broader structure of Operation Bagration, the offensive was a complete success:

- The two key cities and communication / transport centres of Vitebsk and Orsha were captured.
- Heavy damage was inflicted on German forces, with the LIII Corps of Third Panzer Army being almost eliminated and other corps suffering high levels of casualties and loss of equipment.
- The breakthrough of exploitation forces at Orsha, in combination with a similar breakthrough in the south in the parallel Bobruysk offensive operation, set up the planned encirclement of the bulk of the German Fourth Army in the following Minsk offensive operation.
