= Rolf Wuthmann =

German general (1893–1977)

- Born: 26 August 1893; Kassel, Province of Hanover, Kingdom of Prussia, German Empire
- Died: 20 October 1977 (aged 84); Minden, North Rhine-Westphalia, West Germany
- Military career
- Allegiance: German Empire; Weimar Republic; Nazi Germany
- Branch: Imperial German Army; Prussian Army; Freikorps; Reichswehr; German Army
- Service years: 1912–1945
- Rank: General der Artillerie
- Commands: 295th Infantry Division; 112th Infantry Division; IX Army Corps
- Conflicts: World War I; World War II; Invasion of Poland; Battle of France; Operation Barbarossa; Siege of Leningrad; Battle of the Caucasus; Battle of Stalingrad; Battle of Kursk; Operation Bagration; Vitebsk–Orsha Offensive; Polotsk Offensive; Kaunas Offensive; Gumbinnen Operation; East Prussian Offensive; Zemland Offensive
- Awards: Knight's Cross of the Iron Cross

Rolf Fritz Carl Max Willy Wuthmann (26 August 1893 – 20 October 1977) was a German general in the Wehrmacht during World War II who commanded the IX Army Corps. He was a recipient of the Knight's Cross of the Iron Cross.

Wuthmann surrendered to the Red Army in the course of the 1945 Soviet Zemland Offensive. Convicted as an alleged war criminal in the Soviet Union, he was held until 1955.

== Awards and decorations ==
- Iron Cross (1914), 2nd and 1st Class
  - 2nd Class on 27 September 1914
  - 1st Class on 24 May 1916
- Wound Badge (1918) in Black (for his wound on 22 August 1917)
- Baltic Cross on 13 January 1920
- Honour Cross of the World War 1914/1918 with Swords on 30 October 1934
- Wehrmacht Long Service Award, 4th to 1st Class
- Hungarian Order of Merit, Commander's Cross on 5 May 1939
  - Acceptance approval on 31 July 1939
- Anschluss Medal on 12 June 1939
- Clasp to the Iron Cross (1939), 2nd and 1st Class
- Winter Battle in the East 1941–42 Medal
- German Cross in Gold on 26 January 1942 as Oberst i. G. and Chief of the General Staff of the 16th Army
- Knight's Cross of the Iron Cross on 22 August 1944 as General der Artillerie and Commanding General of the IX. Army Corps

Military offices
Preceded by Generalleutnant Karl Gümbel	Commander of 295. Infanterie-Division; 2 May 1942 - 16 November 1942	Succeeded by Generalmajor Dr. Otto Korfes
Preceded by Generalmajor Albert Newiger	Commander of 112. Infanterie-Division; 20 June 1943 - 3 September 1943	Succeeded by Generalleutnant Theobald Lieb
Preceded by General der Infanterie Heinrich Clößner	Commander of IX. Armeekorps; 5 December 1943 - 20 April 1945	Succeeded by Generalleutnant Dr. Hermann Hohn
