= Erich-Heinrich Clößner =

German General in World War II

Erich Clößner
- Born: Philipp Carl Albert Reinhard Erich Clößner; 17 September 1888; Gießen, Grand Duchy of Hesse, German Empire
- Died: 28 March 1976 (aged 87); Konstanz, Baden-Württemberg, West Germany
- Relatives: ∞ 1915 Irene Gabriele Franziska von Gottberg; 1 son
- Military career
- Allegiance: German Empire; Weimar Republic; Nazi Germany
- Branch: Prussian Army; Imperial German Army; Reichsheer; German Army
- Service years: 1907–1945
- Rank: General der Infanterie
- Commands: 25th Panzergrenadier Division; LIII Army Corps; IX Army Corps; 2nd Panzer Army
- Conflicts: World War I; World War II; Anschluss; Occupation of Czechoslovakia; Battle of France; Operation Barbarossa; Battle of Kiev (1941); Battle of Moscow
- Awards: Knight's Cross of the Iron Cross

Philipp Karl Albert Reinhard Erich Clößner (17 September 1888 – 28 March 1976) was a German general during World War II who held commands at the divisional and corps levels. He was a recipient of the Knight's Cross of the Iron Cross of Nazi Germany.

== Promotions ==
- 14 March 1907 Leutnant (2nd Lieutenant) without Patent
  - 15 June 1907 received Patent from 14 June 1907
- 18 December 1914 Oberleutnant (1st Lieutenant)
- 5 October 1916 Hauptmann (Captain)
  - 1 February 1922 received Reichswehr Rank Seniority (RDA) from 5 October 1916 (16)
- 1 December 1929 Major with RDA from 1 February 1928 (5a)
- 1 April 1932 Oberstleutnant (Lieutenant Colonel) with RDA from 1 April 1932 (3)
- 1 June 1934 Oberst (Colonel) with RDA from 1 June 1934 (6)
- 30 September 1937 Generalmajor (Major General) with effect and RDA from 1 October 1937 (5)
- 30 September 1939 Generalleutnant (Lieutenant General) with effect and RDA from 1 October 1939 (4)
- 16 March 1942 General der Infanterie (General of the Infantry) with effect and RDA from 1 January 1942 (2)

== Awards and decorations ==
- Iron Cross (1914), 2nd and 1st Class
  - 2nd Class on 9 September 1914
  - 1st Class on 16 September 1915
- Hessian Bravery Medal (HT) on 5 April 1915
- Bavarian Military Merit Order, 4th Class with Swords (BMV4X/BM4X) on 29 April 1917
- Gallipoli Star (TH) on 5 September 1917
- Military Merit Cross (Austria-Hungary), 3rd Class with the War Decoration (ÖM3K) on 14 April 1918
- Hamburg Hanseatic Cross (HH) on 17 April 1918
- Wound Badge (1918) in Black on 30 May 1918
- Lippe-Detmold War Merit Cross (LK) on 17 September 1918
- Princely Lippe War Cross of Honor for heroic deeds (LE) on 5 November 1918
- Princely House Order of Hohenzollern, Commander's Cross of Honour (HEK2a) on 30 August 1934
  - Colonel Clößner, at the time commander of the 14. (Badisches) Infanterie-Regiment in Konstanz, was awarded the Princely House Order by Friedrich Viktor Fürst von Hohenzollern (1891–1965) in Sigmaringen. Clößner was a guest at the birthday gala banquet for the Fürst at Sigmaringen Castle on this day. Fürst von Hohenzollern had close ties to Constance and the 14th (Baden) Infantry Regiment. The regiment's 5th Company was the bearer of tradition of the Royal Prussian Füsilier-Regiment "Fürst Karl-Anton von Hohenzollern" (Hohenzollernsches) Nr. 40.
- Honour Cross of the World War 1914/1918 with Swords on 19 February 1935
- Cross of Merit of the Finnish Protection Corps (Civil Guard) on 24 September 1936
- Wehrmacht Long Service Award, 4th to 1st Class on 3 October 1936
- Anschluss Medal
- Sudetenland Medal with the “Prague Castle” clasp
- Repetition Clasp 1939 to the Iron Cross 1914, 2nd and 1st Class
  - 2nd Class on 20 May 1940
  - 1st Class on 6 June 1940
- Knight's Cross of the Iron Cross on 29 September 1940 as Generalleutnant and Commander of 25. Infanterie-Division
- German Cross in Gold on 15 July 1942 as General der Infanterie and Commanding General of the LIII. Armeekorps
- Winter Battle in the East 1941–42 Medal on 20 July 1942

Military offices
Preceded by General der Infanterie Walther Fischer von Weikersthal	Commander of LIII. Armeekorps; 15 January 1942 — 22 June 1943	Succeeded by General der Infanterie Friedrich Gollwitzer
Preceded by Generaloberst Rudolf Schmidt	Commander of 2. Panzer-Armee; 11 April 1943 – 6 August 1943	Succeeded by Generalfeldmarschall Walter Model
Preceded by General der Infanterie Hans Schmidt	Commander of IX. Armeekorps; 15 October 1943 – 5 December 1943	Succeeded by General der Infanterie Rolf Wuthmann
