= IX Army Corps (Wehrmacht) =

- IX. Armeekorps
- Active: 1 October 1934 – 8 May 1945
- Country: Nazi Germany
- Branch: Army
- Size: Corps
- Engagements: World War II: Battle of France; Operation Barbarossa; Battle of Białystok–Minsk; Battle of Smolensk (1941); Battle of Moscow; Operation Bagration; Vitebsk–Orsha Offensive; Polotsk Offensive; Kaunas Offensive; Gumbinnen Operation; East Prussian Offensive; Samland Offensive

Commanders
- Notable commanders: Friedrich Dollmann

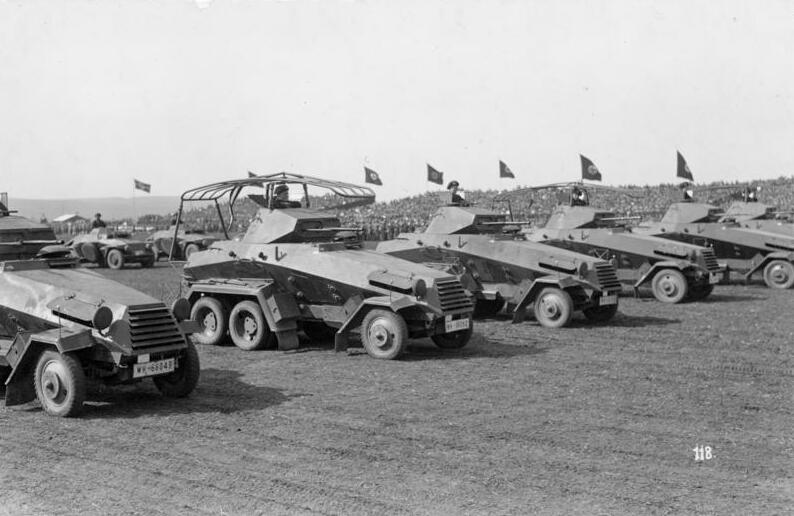
IX Army Corps

IX Army Corps (IX. Armeekorps) was a corps in the German Army during World War II. It was formed on 1 October 1934 under the command of General Friedrich Dollman in Kassel with the camouflage name of Kassel and redesignated IX Corps after the creation of the Wehrkreis IX recruitment and training area.

After the general mobilisation in August 1939 IX Corps were stationed near Worms as 1st Army reserves. In May 1940 they took part in Fall Gelb, the Manstein plan to invade the Low Countries and France via the Ardennes, pushing on to Dunkirk.

Transferred to the Eastern Front in 1941 to take part in Operation Barbarossa, the invasion of the Soviet Union, the corps, at that time consisting of 137th, 263rd and the 292nd Infantry Division, were transferred to the 4th Army under the overall command of Field Marshal Günther von Kluge. They reached the Dnieper river where they encountered strong Soviet resistance and by the end of 1942 had to fall back. In the spring of 1943 further retreat was necessary.

On 22 June 1944, during Operation Bagration, the left corps section in the Sirotino area was attacked by seven Soviet divisions of the Soviet 4th Infantry under General Malychev. Further retreats followed up to the end of the year.

By 1945 the corps had fallen back to the Deyma River near Kaliningrad, where they established a defensive position. The German Army surrendered on 8 May 1945.

== Commanding Generals ==
- Artillery General (General der Artillerie) Friedrich Dollmann, 1 October 1934 – 25 August 1939.
- Infantry General (General der Infanterie) Hermann Geyer, 25 August 1939 – 31 December 1941.
- Infantry General (General der Infanterie) Hans Schmidt, 31 December 1941 – 15 October 1943.
- Infantry General (General der Infanterie) Erich Clößner, 15 October 1943 – 5 December 1943.
- Artillery General (General der Artillerie) Rolf Wuthmann, 5 December 1943 – 20 April 1945.
- Lieutenant-General (Generalleutnant) Dr. Hermann Hohn, 20 April 1945 – 8 May 1945.

== Area of operations ==
- Germany - September 1939 - May 1940.
- France - May 1940 - June 1941.
- Eastern Front, central sector - June 1941 - December 1944.
- East Prussia & northern Germany - January 1945 - May 1945.

== See also ==
- List of German corps in World War II
