= Paul Völckers =

- Born: 15 March 1891
- Died: 25 January 1946 (aged 54); Soviet Union
- Military career
- Allegiance: Nazi Germany
- Branch: Army (Wehrmacht)
- Rank: General der Infanterie
- Commands: 78th Infantry Division; XXVII Army Corps
- Conflicts: Operation Bagration
- Awards: Knight's Cross of the Iron Cross

Paul Gustav Völckers (15 March 1891 – 25 January 1946) was a German General of the Infantry in the Wehrmacht during World War II who commanded the XXVII Army Corps. He was a recipient of the Knight's Cross of the Iron Cross of Nazi Germany.

Völckers surrendered to the Red Army in the course of the Soviet 1944 Operation Bagration. He died in a POW camp in the Soviet Union in 1946.

== Awards ==
- Knight's Cross of the Iron Cross on 11 December 1942 as Generalleutnant and commander of 78. Infanterie-Division
