= Operation Bagration =

1944 Soviet military offensive during WW2

- Part of the Eastern Front of World War II
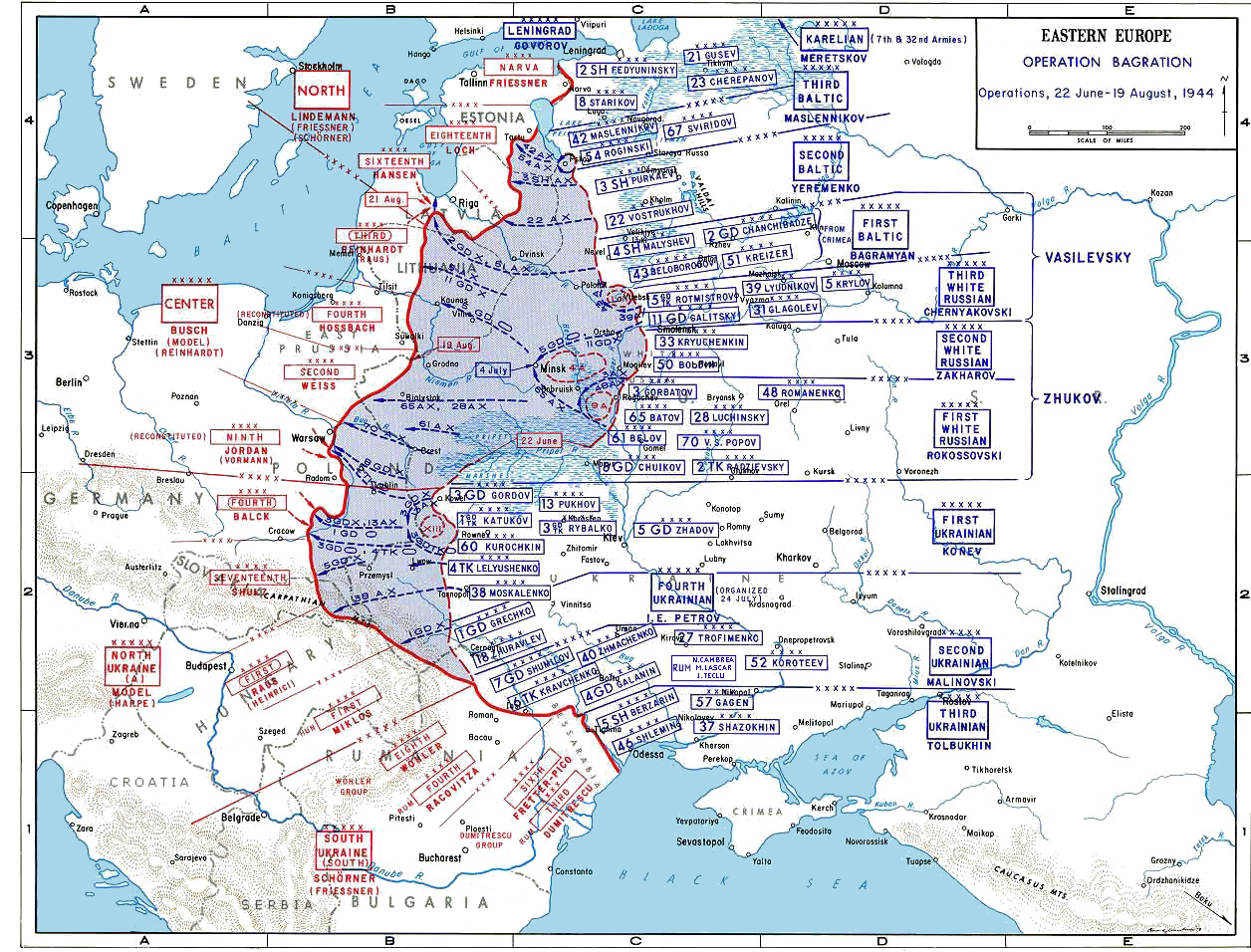
- Deployments during Operation Bagration
Date	22 June – 19 August 1944 (1 month and 4 weeks)
Location	Soviet Union (Belarus and Ukraine), Baltic states, and Eastern Poland
Result	Soviet victory
Territorial changes	Red Army retakes all of Byelorussian SSR, most of Lithuania and gains foothold in Eastern Poland.

Belligerents
Germany; Hungary; Romania	Soviet Union; Poland

Commanders and leaders
(Nazi Germany) Ernst Busch; (Nazi Germany) Walter Model; (Nazi Germany) Hans Jordan; (Nazi Germany) Nikolaus von Vormann; (Nazi Germany) Georg-Hans Reinhardt; (Nazi Germany) Kurt von Tippelskirch; (Nazi Germany) Walter Weiß	(Soviet Union) Georgy Zhukov; (Soviet Union) Aleksandr Vasilevsky; (Soviet Union) Konstantin Rokossovsky; (Soviet Union) Ivan Bagramyan; (Soviet Union) Georgiy Zakharov; (Soviet Union) Ivan Chernyakhovsky; (Soviet Union) Ivan Konev; Zygmunt Berling

Units involved
Army Group Center; 3rd Panzer Army; 9th Army; 4th Army; 2nd Army	1st Baltic Front; 1st Belorussian Front; 2nd Belorussian Front; 3rd Belorussian Front; 1st Ukrainian Front; 1st Polish Army; Fighter Squadron 2/30 Normandie-Niemen

Strength
Initially: 486,493 combat personnel ~849,000 total 118 tanks 452 assault guns 3,236 field guns and howitzers 920 aircraft In total (Soviet sources): 1,036,760 personnel ~800 tanks 530 assault guns 7,760 field guns 2,320 anti-aircraft guns ~1,000–1,300 aircraft	Initially: 1,670,300 personnel 3,841 tanks and 1,977 assault guns 32,718 guns, rocket launchers and mortars 7,799 aircraft In total (Frieser): ~2,500,000 personnel ~6,000 tanks and assault guns ~45,000 guns, rocket launchers and mortars ~8,000 aircraft

Casualties and losses
Zaloga: 300,000–375,000 killed, missing or captured ~150,000–225,000 killed or missing ~150,000 captured Frieser: 399,102 26,397 killed 109,776 wounded 262,929 missing and captured Glantz and House: ~450,000 combat casualties Isayev: ~500,000 combat casualties Soviet sources: 539,480 killed, missing or captured ~381,000 killed 158,480 captured	Glantz and House: 770,888 (including ~550,000 combat casualties) ~180,000 killed or missing ~340,000–590,848 wounded or sick 2,957 tanks and assault guns 2,447 guns 822 aircraft

Operation Bagration (Note: Named after Pyotr Bagration; in Russian pronounced [bəɡrɐtʲɪˈon] and in English /bəˈɡreɪʃən/ bə-GRAY-shən or /bəˌɡrɑːtsiˈoʊn/ bə-GRAHT-see-OHN.) (Russian: Операция «Багратио́н», romanized: Operatsiya Bagration) was the codename for the 1944 Soviet Byelorussian strategic offensive operation (Note: Alternative spellings for Byelorussian offensive are Belorussian offensive and Belarusian offensive) (Russian: Белорусская наступательная операция «Багратион», romanized: Belorusskaya nastupatelnaya operatsiya "Bagration"), a military campaign fought between 22 June and 19 August 1944 in Soviet Byelorussia in the Eastern Front of World War II, (Note: Not to be confused with the 1943 Belorussian Strategic Offensive Operation (3 October – 31 December 1943)) just over two weeks after the start of Operation Overlord in the west. It was during this operation that Nazi Germany was forced to fight simultaneously on two major fronts for the first time since the war began. The Soviet Union destroyed 28 of the divisions of Army Group Centre and completely shattered the German front line. The overall engagement is the largest defeat in German military history, with around 450,000 German casualties, while setting the stage for the subsequent isolation of 300,000 German soldiers in the Courland Pocket.

On 22 June 1944, the Red Army attacked Army Group Centre in Byelorussia, with the objective of encircling and destroying its main component armies. By 28 June, the German 4th Army had been destroyed, along with most of the 3rd Panzer and 9th Armies. The Red Army exploited the collapse of the German front line to encircle German formations in the vicinity of Minsk in the Minsk Offensive and destroy them, with Minsk liberated on 4 July. With the end of effective German resistance in Byelorussia, the Soviet offensive continued on to Lithuania, Poland and Romania over the course of July and August.

The Red Army successfully used the strategies of Soviet deep battle and maskirovka (deception) to their full extent for the first time, albeit with continuing heavy losses. Operation Bagration diverted German mobile reserves from the Lublin–Brest and Lvov–Sandomierz areas to the central sectors, enabling the Soviets to undertake the Lvov–Sandomierz Offensive and Lublin–Brest Offensive. This allowed the Red Army to reach the Vistula River and Warsaw, which in turn put Soviet forces within striking distance of Berlin, conforming to the concept of Soviet deep operations –striking into the enemy's strategic depths.

== Background ==
Germany's Army Group Centre had previously proven difficult to counter, as the Soviet defeat in Operation Mars had shown. However, by June 1944, despite shortening its front line, it was exposed following the defeats of Army Group South in the Battle of Kursk, the Battle of Kiev, the Dnieper–Carpathian offensive and the Crimean offensive in the late summer, autumn, and winter of 1943–44. In the north, Army Group North was also pushed back, leaving Army Group Center's lines protruding towards the east and at risk of losing contact with neighbouring army groups.

The German High Command expected the next Soviet offensive to fall against Army Group North Ukraine (Field Marshal Walter Model), and it lacked the necessary intelligence capabilities to discover the Soviets' true intentions.

The Wehrmacht had redeployed one-third of Army Group Centre artillery, half of its tank destroyers, and 88 percent of tanks to the south. The entire operational reserve on the Eastern front (18 Panzer and mechanised divisions, stripped from Army Groups North and Centre) was deployed to Model's sector, leaving Army Group Centre with a total of only 580 tanks, tank destroyers, and assault guns. German lines were thinly held; for example, the 9th Army sector had 143 soldiers per kilometre of the front.

A key factor in the subsequent collapse of Army Group Center during Operation Bagration was the Soviet Dnieper–Carpathian offensive in Ukraine. The success of this Soviet offensive had convinced the Oberkommando des Heeres (Army High Command, OKH) that the southern sector of the Eastern Front would be the staging area for the main Soviet summer offensive of 1944. As a result, German forces stationed in the south, panzer divisions in particular, received priority in reinforcements. Furthermore, during this Soviet offensive in the spring of 1944, aimed at the city of Kovel, Army Group Center was significantly weakened by being forced to transfer nine divisions and numerous independent armored formations from its main front to its far right flank, located deep in the rear at the junction with Army Group South. These forces would then be attached to Army Group North Ukraine, the successor to Army Group South. This meant that Army Group Center was effectively deprived of well over 100,000 personnel and 552 tanks, assault guns and self-propelled guns at the start of Operation Bagration.

Operation Bagration, in combination with the neighbouring Lvov–Sandomierz offensive, launched a few weeks later in Ukraine, allowed the Soviet Union to recapture Byelorussia and Ukraine within its 1941 borders, advance into German East Prussia, but more importantly, the Lvov–Sandomierz Offensive allowed the Red Army to reach the outskirts of Warsaw after gaining control of Poland east of the Vistula river. The campaign enabled the next operation, the Vistula–Oder Offensive, to come within sight of the German capital. The Soviets were initially surprised at the success of the Byelorussian operation which had nearly reached Warsaw. The Soviet advance encouraged the Warsaw Uprising against the German occupation forces.

The battle has been described as the triumph of the Soviet theory of the "operational art" because of the complete coordination of all the strategic front movements and signals traffic to fool the enemy about the target of the offensive. The military tactical operations of the Red Army successfully avoided the mobile reserves of the Wehrmacht and continually "wrong-footed" the German forces. Despite the massive forces involved, Soviet front commanders left their adversaries completely confused about the main axis of attack until it was too late.

== Soviet plans ==
=== Strategic aims and deception ===
The Russian maskirovka is roughly equivalent to the English camouflage, but it has broader application in military use. During World War II the term was used by Soviet commanders to describe measures to create deception with the goal of inflicting surprise on the Wehrmacht forces.

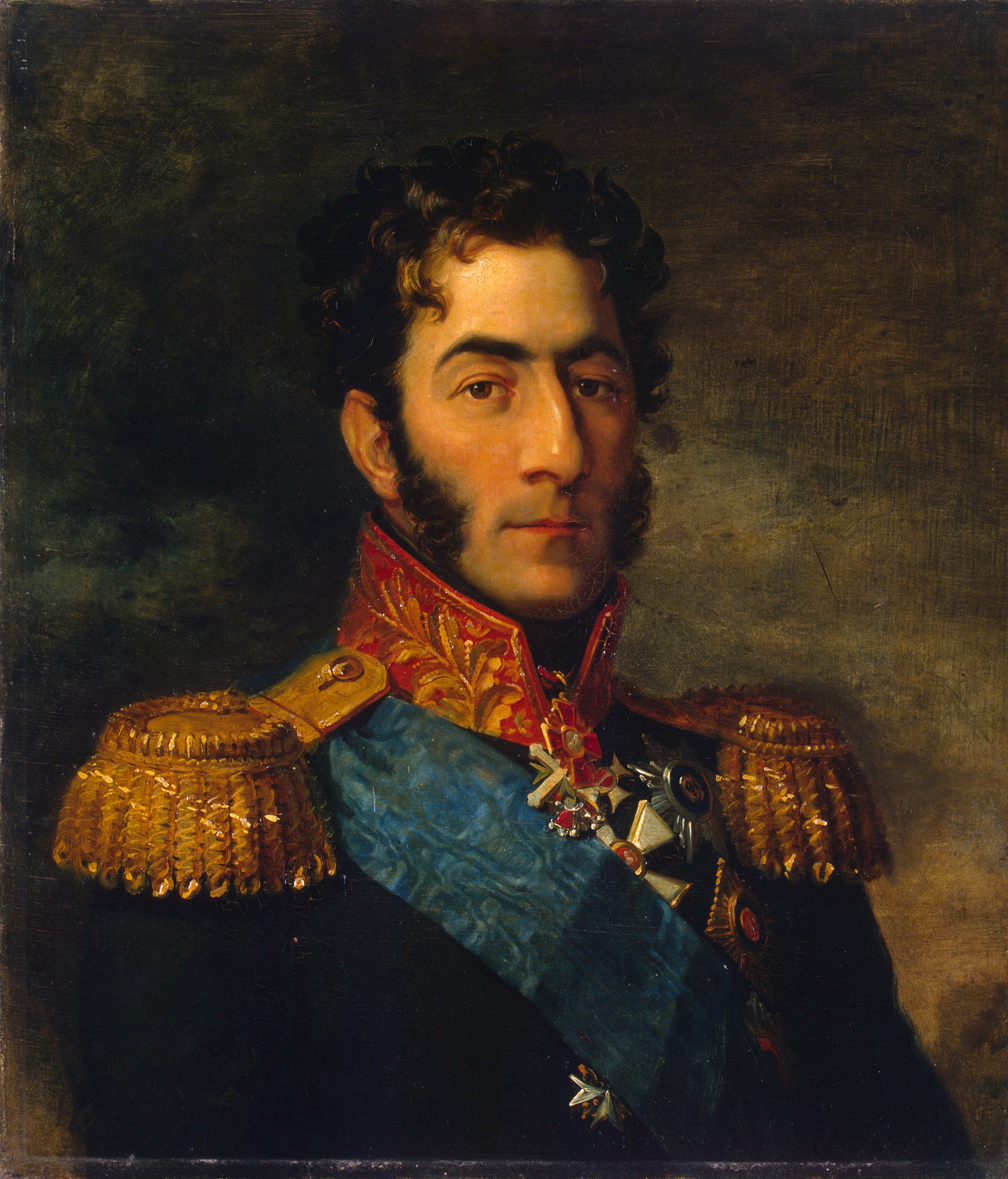
The Soviet operation was named after the Georgian prince Pyotr Bagration (1765–1812), a general of the Imperial Russian Army during the Napoleonic Wars.

The OKH expected the Soviets to launch a major offensive in the summer of 1944. The Stavka (Soviet High Command) considered a number of options. The timetable of operations between June and August had been decided on by 28 April 1944. The Stavka rejected an offensive in either the L'vov sector or the Yassy-Kishinev sectors owing to the presence of powerful enemy mobile forces equal in strength to the Soviet strategic fronts. Instead they suggested four options: an offensive into Romania and through the Carpathian Mountains, an offensive into the western Ukrainian SSR aimed at the Baltic coast, an attack into the Baltic, and an offensive in the Byelorussian SSR. The first two options were rejected as being too ambitious and open to flank attack. The third option was rejected on the grounds the enemy was too well prepared. The only safe option was an offensive into Byelorussia which would enable subsequent offensives from Ukraine into Poland and Romania.

The Soviet and German High Commands recognised western Ukraine as a staging area for an offensive into Poland. The Soviets, aware that the enemy would anticipate this, sought to deceive the Germans by creating a crisis in Byelorussia that would force the Germans to move their powerful armoured forces, fresh from their victory in the First Jassy–Kishinev Offensive in April–June 1944, to the central front to support Army Group Centre. This was the primary purpose of Bagration.

In order to maximize the chances of success, the maskirovka was a double bluff. The Soviets left four tank armies in the L'vov-Peremyshl area and allowed the Germans to know it. The attack into Romania in April–June further convinced the Soviets that the Axis forces in Romania needed removing and kept the Germans concerned about their defences there and in southern Poland, while drawing German forces to the L'vov sector. Once the offensive against Army Group Centre, which lacked mobile reserves and support, had been initiated, it would create a crisis in the central sector that would force the German armoured forces north to Byelorussia from Poland and Romania, despite the presence of powerful Soviet concentrations threatening German-occupied Poland.

The intent of the Soviets to strike their main blow towards the Vistula can be seen in the Red Army's (albeit fragmented) order of battle. The Soviet general staff studies of both the Byelorussian and L'vov-Sandomierz operations reveal that the L'vov-Przemyśl operation received the overwhelming number of tank and mechanized corps. Six guards tank corps and six tank corps along with three guards mechanized and two mechanized corps were committed to the L'vov operation. This totaled twelve tank and five mechanized corps. In contrast, Operation Bagration's Baltic and Byelorussian Fronts were allocated just eight tank and two mechanized corps. The 1st Byelorussian Front (an important part of the L'vov-Premyshl operation) is not mentioned on the Soviet battle order for the offensive. It contained a further six armies and was to protect the flank of the Lublin–Brest Offensive as well as engage in offensive operations in that area.

The bulk of tactical resources, in particular anti-tank artillery, was allocated to the 1st Ukrainian Front, the spearhead of the Vistula, L'vov-Premyshl operation. Thirty-eight of the 54 anti-tank regiments allocated to the Byelorussian-Baltic-Ukrainian operations were given to the 1st Ukrainian Front. This demonstrates that the Soviet plans for the L'vov operation were a major consideration and whoever planned the offensive was determined to hold the recently captured territory. The target for this operation was the Vistula bridgehead and the enormous anti-tank artillery forces helped repulse big counter-attacks by German armoured formations in August–October 1944. One American author suggests that these Soviet innovations were enabled, in part, by the provision of over 220,000 Dodge and Studebaker trucks by the United States to motorize the Soviet infantry.

The basic directive from Stavka of 31 May for Bagration embodied a relatively new direction in Soviet strategic planning: for the Belorussian operation, immediate Front assignments were limited to a depth of 50–65 kilometres (30–40 mi), and wider objectives were set at a range not exceeding 160 kilometres (100 mi) (in contrast to previous wildly ambitious, if unrealistic, Stavka operational directives). The original timetable was 15–20 June but Stalin agreed to a four-day postponement, and told Kaganovich to investigate and to speed up rail movements after complaints from Zhukov and Vasilevsky.

Most of the aviation units, fighter aircraft and assault aviation (strike aircraft) were given to the L'vov operation and the protection of the 1st Ukrainian Front. Of the 78 fighter and assault aviation divisions committed to Bagration, 32 were allocated to the L'vov operation and contained more than was committed to the Byelorussian operation. This concentration of aviation was to protect the Vistula bridgeheads against air attack and to assault German counteroffensives from the air.

=== Success of deception ===
Toward the beginning of June 1944, the German High Command, Army Group Center and the army commands had identified a large part of the concentration against Army Group Centre, although they still considered that the main operation would be against Army Group North Ukraine. On 10 June the OKH adopted the opinion of Army Group Centre in its estimate of the enemy situation:

When it is still to be considered that the attack against Army Group Centre will be a secondary operation in the framework of the global Soviet offensive operations, it must be taken into account that the enemy will also be capable in front of Army Group Centre to build concentrations of which the force of penetration cannot be underestimated in view of the ratio of forces between the two sides. On 14 June, the Chief of Staff of Army Group Centre told General Kurt Zeitzler, the Chief of the Army General Staff, said that "...the Russian concentration here [in front of 9th Army] and at the Autobahn clearly indicates that the enemy attack will be aimed at the wings of the Army Group".

On 19 June, Army Group Centre noted in its estimate of the enemy situation that the concentration of enemy air forces had become greater (4,500 out of 11,000) and that this left new doubts regarding OKH's estimate. OKH saw no grounds for this supposition. Shortly before the beginning of the Soviet offensive, the army commands had detected some enemy forces near the front and had identified the places where the main Soviet attacks would take place, with the exception of 6th Guards Army near Vitebsk. The Soviet strategic reserves were not detected.

=== Operations Rail War and Concert ===
The start of Operation Bagration involved many Soviet partisan formations in the Byelorussian SSR, which were instructed to resume their attacks on railways and communications. From 19 June large numbers of explosive charges were placed on rail tracks and though many were cleared, they had a significant disruptive effect. The partisans were also used to mop up encircled German forces once the breakthrough and exploitation phases of the operation were completed.

== Disposition of forces ==
The Stavka had committed approximately 1,670,300 combat and support personnel, approximately 32,718 artillery pieces and mortars, 5,818 tanks and assault guns and 7,799 aircraft. Army Group Centre's strength was 486,000 combat personnel (849,000 total, including support personnel). The army group had 3,236 field guns and other artillery pieces (not including mortars) but only 495 operational tanks and assault guns and 920 available aircraft, of which 602 were operational. Army Group Centre was seriously short of mobile reserves: the demotorized 14th Infantry Division was the only substantial reserve formation, though the 20th Panzer Division, with 56 tanks, was positioned in the south near Bobruisk and the Panzergrenadier Division Feldherrnhalle, still in the process of forming, was also held in reserve. Furthermore, the Germans were supported by collaborationist troops such as the Lithuanian Security Police. The relatively static lines in Byelorussia had enabled the Germans to construct extensive field fortifications, with multiple trench lines to a depth of several kilometres and heavily mined defensive belts.

Besides the pro-German and pro-Soviet forces, some third-party factions were also involved in the fighting during Operation Bagration, most notably several resistance groups of the Polish Home Army. The latter mostly fought both the German as well as the Soviet-led troops. Some Home Army partisan factions regarded the Soviet Union as the greater threat, however, and negotiated ceasefires or even ad-hoc alliances with the German occupation forces. Such deals were condemned by the Home Army's leadership, and several partisan officers who cooperated with the Germans against the Soviets were subsequently court-martialed.

However, many times Polish Home Army fought Soviet troops in self-defence. Most often, Polish Home Army supported approaching Soviet forces and attacked German troops according to a plan of Operation Tempest. The plan was to cooperate with the advancing Red Army on a tactical level, while Polish civil authorities came out from underground and took power in Allied-controlled Polish territory. The plan failed, as Soviet troops would attack Polish Home Army groups after cooperation against German troops. Many Polish Home Army soldiers were killed in action, enlisted to the Soviet-controlled Polish People's Army, murdered, imprisoned or deported.

=== Order of battle ===
Red Army | Army Group Centre

Two special representatives to Stavka were appointed to coordinate the operations of the Fronts involved: Aleksandr Vasilevsky and Georgy Zhukov.

- 1st Baltic Front (Army General Ivan Bagramyan)
  - 4th Shock Army (Lieutenant-General Pyotr Malyshev)
  - 6th Guards Army (Lieutenant-General Ivan Chistyakov)
  - 43rd Army (Lieutenant-General Afanasy Beloborodov)
  - 3rd Air Army (Lieutenant-General Nikolai Papivin)
- 3rd Belorussian Front (Army General Ivan Chernyakhovsky)
  - 11th Guards Army (Lieutenant-General Kuzma Galitsky)
  - 5th Army (Lieutenant-General Nikolai Krylov)
  - 39th Army (Lieutenant-General Ivan Lyudnikov)
  - 31st Army (Lieutenant-General Vasily Glagolev)
  - 5th Guards Tank Army (Marshal of Armour (Army General) Pavel Rotmistrov)
  - 1st Air Army (Lieutenant General Mikhail Gromov)
  - Cavalry-mechanised group under command of Lieutenant-General Nikolai Oslikovsky, including 3rd Guards Cavalry Corps
- 2nd Belorussian Front (Colonel-General Georgiy Zakharov)
  - 33rd Army (Lieutenant-General Vasily Kryuchenkin)
  - 49th Army (Lieutenant-General Ivan Grishin)
  - 50th Army (Lieutenant-General Ivan Boldin)
  - 4th Air Army (Colonel-General Konstantin Vershinin)
- 1st Belorussian Front (Army General Konstantin Rokossovsky)
  - 3rd Army (Colonel-General Alexander Gorbatov)
  - 8th Guards Army (Lieutenant-General Vasily Chuikov)
  - 28th Army (Lieutenant-General Alexander Luchinsky)
  - 48th Army (Lieutenant-General Prokofy Romanenko)
  - 65th Army (Lieutenant-General Pavel Batov)
  - 16th Air Army (Colonel-General Serhiy Rudenko)
  - Cavalry-mechanised group under command of Lieutenant-General Issa Pliev, including 1st Mechanised Corps and 4th Guards Cavalry Corps
- 1st Ukrainian Front (Marshal of the Soviet Union Ivan Konev)
  - 3rd Guards Army (Colonel-General Vasily Gordov)
  - 13th Army (Colonel-General Nikolay Pukhov)
  - 60th Army (Colonel-General Pavel Kurochkin)
  - 38th Army (Colonel-General Kirill Moskalenko
  - 1st Guards Army (Colonel-General Andrei Grechko
  - 18th Army (Lieutenant-General Evgeni Zhuravlyov)
  - 1st Guards Tank Army (Colonel-General Mikhail Katukov)
  - 3rd Guards Tank Army (Colonel-General Pavel Rybalko)
  - 4th Tank Army (Lieutenant-General Vasily Badanov)
  - 5th Guards Army (Lieutenant-General Aleksey Zhadov)
  - Cavalry-mechanised Group 1 and 2

The 1st Belorussian Front was particularly large and included further units which were only committed during the follow-on Lublin-Brest Offensive.

- Army Group Centre (Generalfeldmarschall Ernst Busch to 28 June; then Generalfeldmarschall Walter Model)
  - 3rd Panzer Army (Generaloberst Georg-Hans Reinhardt)
    - VI Corps (General der Artillerie Georg Pfeiffer to 28 June)
    - IX Corps (General der Artillerie Rolf Wuthmann)
    - LIII Corps (General der Infanterie Friedrich Gollwitzer)
    - Reserve: 14th Infantry Division
  - 4th Army (General der Infanterie Kurt von Tippelskirch)
    - XXVII Corps (General der Infanterie Paul Völckers)
    - XXXIX Panzer Corps (General der Infanterie Robert Martinek to 28 June; then Generalleutnant Otto Schünemann to 29 June)
    - XII Corps (Generalleutnant Vincenz Müller)
    - Reserve: Panzergrenadier-Division Feldherrnhalle, 286th Security Division
  - 9th Army (General der Infanterie Hans Jordan to 27 June; then General der Panzertruppe Nikolaus von Vormann)
    - XXXV Corps (Generalleutnant Kurt-Jürgen Freiherr von Lützow)
    - XXXXI Panzer Corps (Generalleutnant Edmund Hoffmeister)
    - LV Corps (General der Infanterie Friedrich Herrlein)
    - Reserve: 20th Panzer Division, 707th Infantry Division
  - Second Army (Generaloberst Walter Weiß)

2nd Army was not involved in the first or second phases of the German defense, being positioned south of the main axis of Soviet operations.

=== Feste Plätze ===
The Wehrmacht's forces were based on logistic lines of communications and centres, which on Hitler's orders were declared Feste Plätze (fortified towns to be held at all costs) by OKH. General Jordan of 9th Army was very worried at how vulnerable this immobility made the army, correctly predicting that "if a Soviet offensive breaks out the Army will either have to go over to a mobile defence or see its front smashed". Because the initial offensive in Belarus was thought to be a feint, the Feste Plätze spanned the entire length of the Eastern Front. Army Group Centre had Feste Plätze at Vitebsk, Orsha, Mogilev, Baranovichi, Minsk, Babruysk, Slutsk, and Vilnius.

== Battle – first phase: tactical breakthrough ==
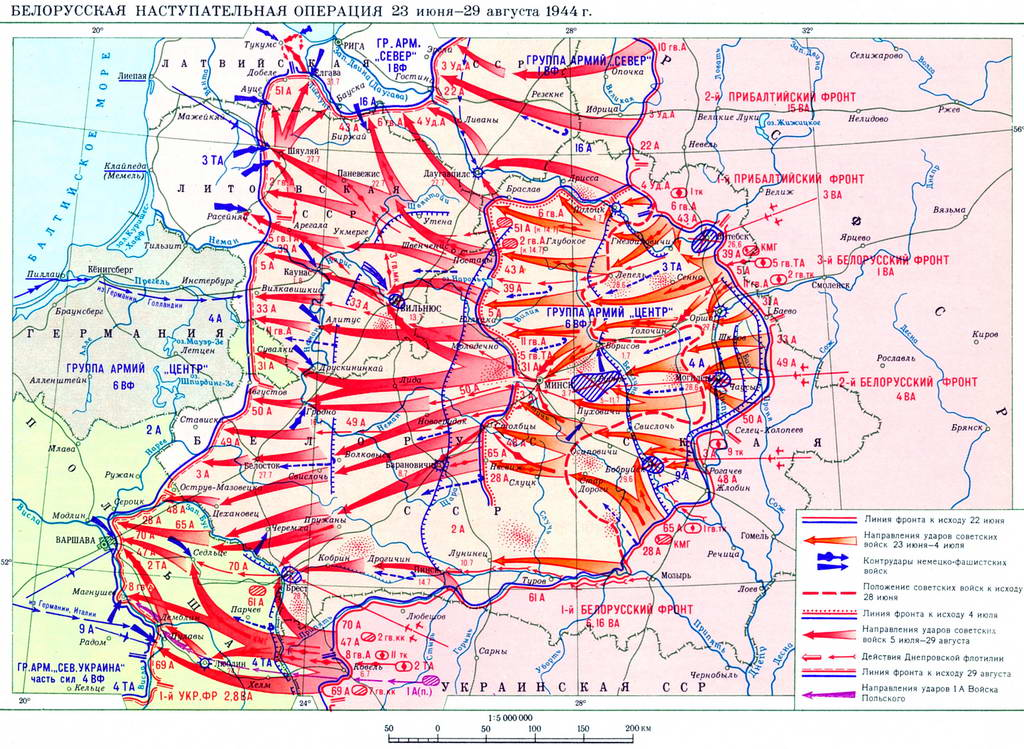
Map of Operation Bagration

Operation Bagration was launched on a staggered schedule, with partisan attacks behind German lines beginning on 19–20 June. On the night of 21–22 June, the Red Army launched probing attacks on German frontline positions, combined with bombing raids on Wehrmacht's lines of communication. The main offensive began in the early morning of 22 June, with an artillery bombardment of unprecedented scale against the defensive works. The initial assault achieved breakthroughs almost everywhere.

The first phase of Soviet deep operations, the "deep battle", envisaged breaking through the tactical zones and forward German defences. Once these tactical offensives had been successful, fresh operational reserves were to exploit the breakthrough and the operational depths of the enemy front using powerful mechanized and armoured formations to encircle enemy concentrations on an Army Group scale.

=== Vitebsk–Orsha offensive ===
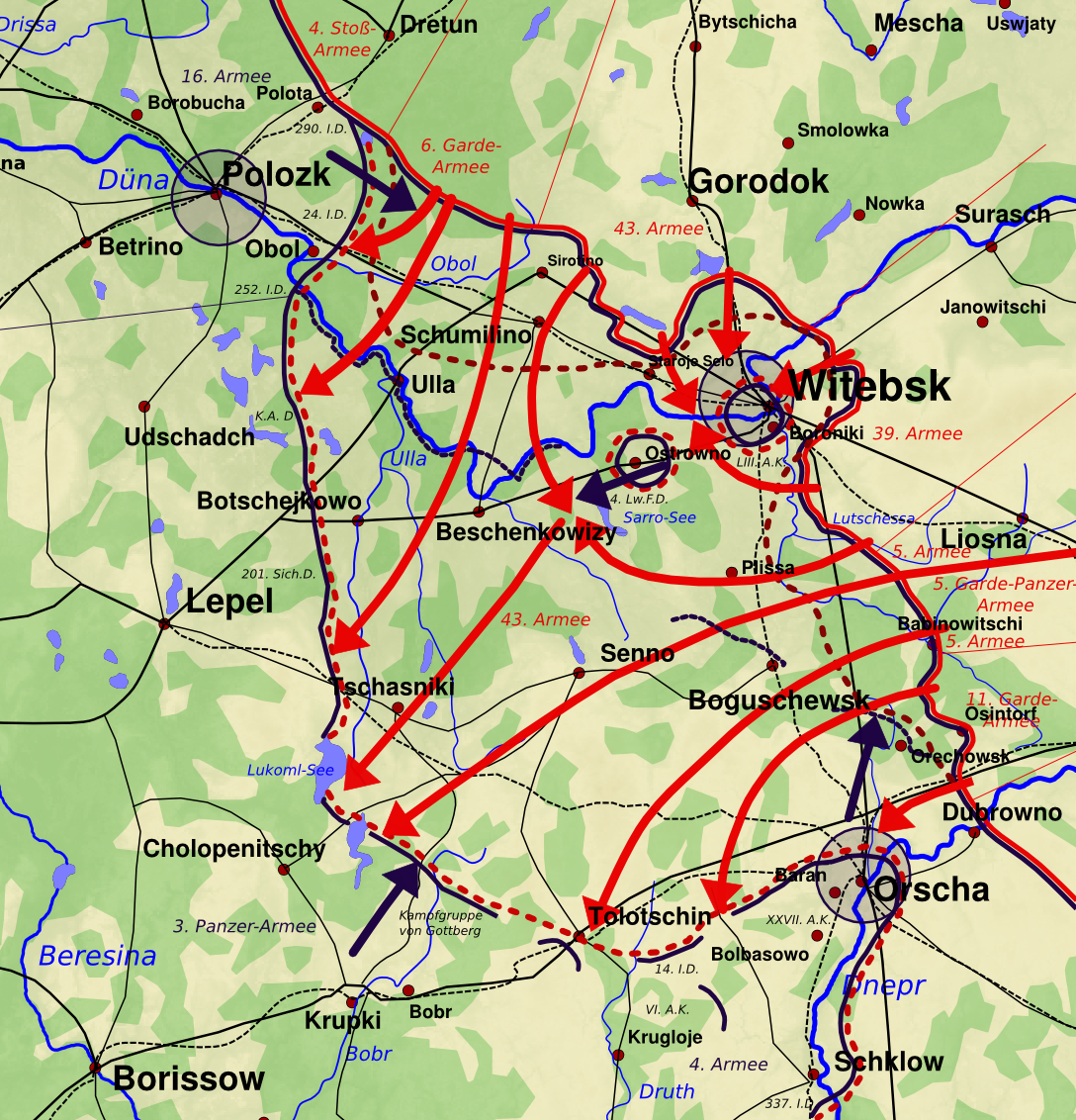
Map of the Vitebsk–Orsha offensive, 22–28 June 1944

Army Group Centre's northern flank was defended by the 3rd Panzer Army under the command of Georg-Hans Reinhardt; the lines ran through marshy terrain in the north, through a salient round the city of Vitebsk, to a sector north of the main Moscow–Minsk road, held by the 4th Army. It was opposed by the 1st Baltic Front of Hovhannes Bagramyan, and Ivan Chernyakhovsky's 3rd Belorussian Front, which were given the task of breaking through the defences to the north and south of Vitebsk and cutting off the salient.

In the north, the 1st Baltic Front pushed the German IX Corps over the Dvina, while encircling the LIII Corps in the city of Vitebsk by 24 June, opening a gash in the frontline of 40 kilometres (25 miles) wide. The Soviet command inserted its mobile forces to begin exploitation in operational depth. To the south, the 3rd Belorussian Front attacked the VI Corps, pushing it so far to the south that it came under the command of the 4th Army.

The LIII Corps had received permission to retreat on 24 June with three divisions, while leaving one division behind in the Feste Platz Vitebsk. However, by the time the order arrived, the city was already encircled. General Friedrich Gollwitzer, the commander of the Vitebsk "strongpoint", decided to disobey the order and have all units of his corps break out at the same time. Abandoning its heavy equipment, the corps began a breakout attempt in the morning of 26 June but quickly ran into Soviet roadblocks outside the city. Vitebsk was taken by 29 June, with the entire LIII Corps of 28,000 men eliminated from the German order of battle.

The 3rd Belorussian Front simultaneously opened operations against the 4th Army's XXVII Corps holding Orsha and the main Moscow–Minsk highway. Despite a tenacious German defense, Orsha was liberated by 26 June, and the 3rd Belorussian Front's mechanized forces were able to penetrate far into the German rear, reaching the Berezina River by 28 June.

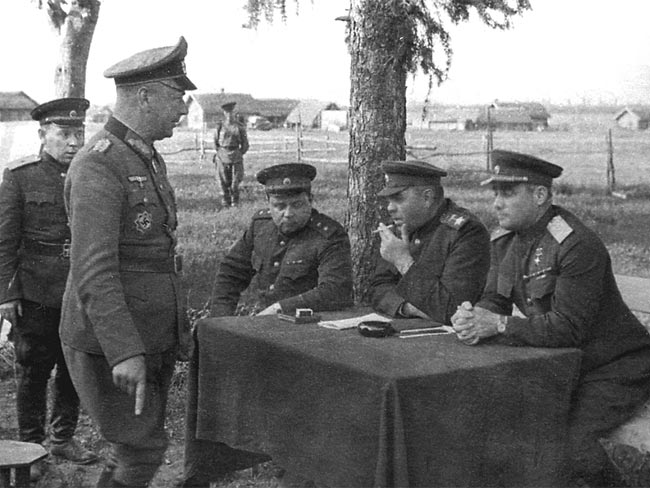
Field Marshal Aleksandr Vasilevsky and General Ivan Chernyakhovsky interrogate General Alfons Hitter (standing) after the battle of Vitebsk.

The central sector of Soviet operations was against the long front of 4th Army, under the command of Kurt von Tippelskirch. Soviet plans envisaged the bulk of it, the XXXIX Panzer Corps and XII Corps, being encircled while pinned down by attacks from the 2nd Belorussian Front in the parallel Mogilev Offensive Operation. By far the most important Soviet objective, however, was the main Moscow–Minsk road and the town of Orsha, which the southern wing of Chernyakhovsky's 3rd Belorussian Front was ordered to take. A breakthrough in this area, against General Paul Völckers' XXVII Corps, would form the northern pincer of the encirclement. The Minsk highway was protected by extensive defensive works manned by the 78th Assault Division, a specially reinforced unit with extra artillery and assault gun support. Orsha itself had been designated a Feste Plätze under the 78th Division's commander.

The Soviet assault on this sector opened on 22 June with a massive artillery barrage that destroyed defensive positions, flattened bunkers, and detonated ammunition stores. Infantry from the 11th Guards Army, 5th Army and 31st Army then attacked the German positions, breaking through the first defensive belt on the same day. The German deployment of its only reserve division was met the next day with the insertion of the massed Soviet tank brigades, which achieved the operational breakthrough. By 25 June, Soviet forces began to advance into the German rear.

Völckers' position was further threatened by the near-collapse of the 3rd Panzer Army's VI Corps, immediately to the north. By midnight on 25 June, the 11th Guards Army had shattered the remains of VI Corps, and 26 June saw the German forces in retreat. Soviet tank forces of the 2nd Guards Tank Corps were able to push up the road towards Minsk at speed, with a subsidiary force breaking off to encircle Orsha, which was liberated on the evening of 26 June. The main exploitation force, Pavel Rotmistrov's 5th Guards Tank Army, was then committed through the gap in the German lines. VI Corps finally crumbled completely; its commander, General Georg Pfeiffer, was killed on 28 June after losing contact with his divisions. Achieving complete success, the operation effectively ceased with the arrival of 5th Guards Tank Army's forward units at the Berezina River on 28 June.

=== Mogilev offensive ===
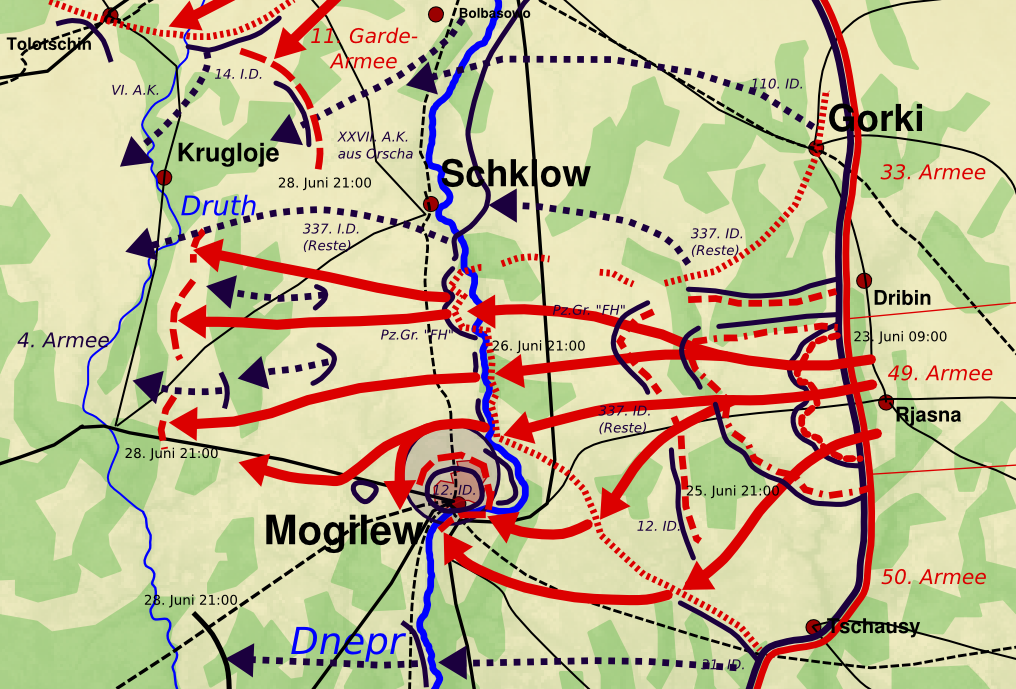
Map of the Mogilev offensive, 22–28 June

The centre of the 4th Army was holding the tip of the Byelorussian bulge, with the bulk of its forces on a shallow bridgehead east of the Dnieper River. The Mogilev Offensive opened with an intense artillery barrage against the German defensive lines on the morning of 22 June. The goal of the 2nd Belorussian Front (Colonel-General Gyorgy Zakharov) was to pin the 4th Army near Mogilev while the developing Vitebsk–Orsha and Bobruysk Offensives encircled it.

East of Mogilev, General Robert Martinek's XXXIX Panzer Corps attempted to hold its lines in the face of an assault by the 49th Army during which the latter suffered heavy casualties. The 4th Army commander, Tippelskirch, requested that the army be allowed to withdraw on 25 June. When the permission was not forthcoming, he authorised his units to withdraw to the Dnieper; this was countermanded by the Army Group commander, Busch, who instructed Tippelskirch to order the units to return to their positions. This was however impossible as a cohesive frontline no longer existed. With the front collapsing, Busch met with Hitler on 26 June and received the authorisation to pull the army back to the Berezina River, 100 kilometres (60 miles) west of Mogilev. The 49th Army forced the Dnieper crossings on the evening of 27 June and fought its way into the city during the night, while mobile units enveloped the garrison from the northwest.

During the day both the German XII Corps and XXXIX Panzer Corps began falling back towards the Berezina crossings. Travel was nearly impossible by day, due to the omnipresence of the Soviet air force, while Soviet tank columns and roadblocks provided constant obstacles. The main body of 4th Army arrived at the crossing on 30 June. It largely completed the crossing by 2 July, under heavy Soviet bombardment, but was retreating into a trap. The Mogilev Offensive fulfilled all its immediate objectives; not only was the city itself taken, but the 4th Army was successfully prevented from disengaging in time to escape encirclement in the Minsk Offensive, which commenced immediately afterwards.

=== Bobruysk offensive ===
To capture Bobruysk, General Konstantin Rokossovsky proposed during the planning of Operation Bagration a multi-pronged approach by seizing both Bobruysk and Slutsk and ultimately destroying the German 9th Army under Generalfeldmarschall Jordan by attacking both fortress cities with equal priority and strength, with which the Soviet General Staff and Stalin himself had initially disagreed. However, Rokossovsky stubbornly insisted and promised Stalin that the operation would be a success.

According to Rokossovsky's plan, the 1st Belorussian Front would be divided into two sectors - the Soviet 3rd Army under the command of General Alexander Gorbatov striking from Rogachev and the sector comprising the Soviet 10th, 28th and 65th Armies as well as the Cavalry-Mechanised Group (KMG) under the command of Lieutenant General Issa Pliyev mounting its assault from Parichi. The Rogachev sector would be supervised by Zhukov, while the group of forces in Parichi would be commanded by Rokossovsky himself. A rivalry formed between the two most competent commanders of the Soviet Red Army as the two raced against each other towards Bobruysk.

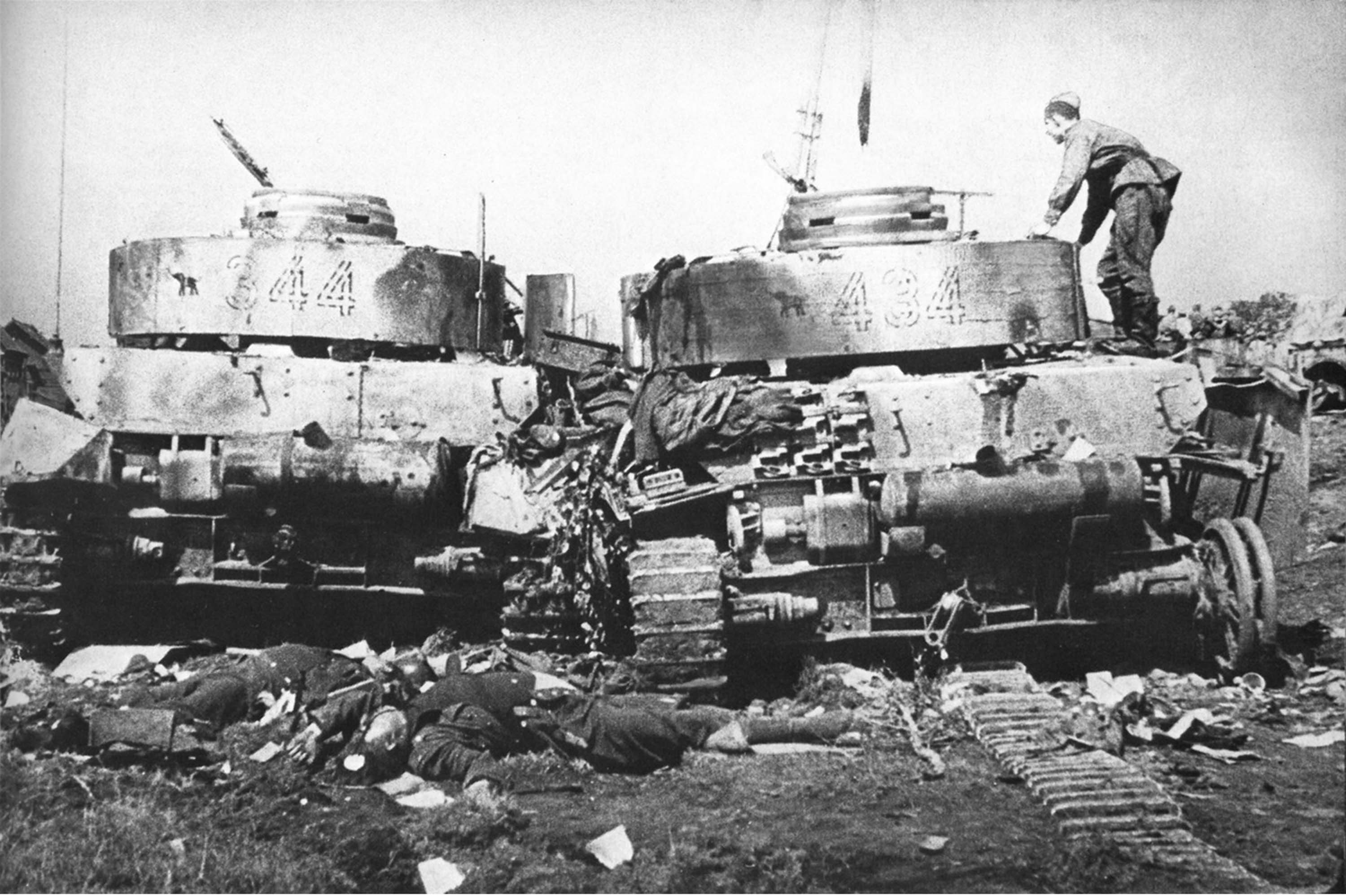
Two destroyed Panzer IV tanks belonging to the 20th Panzer Division, June 1944

On 24 June 1944, 7,000 guns, mortars and rocket launchers of the 1st Belorussian Front began firing on the troops of the German 9th Army, while ground-attack aircraft strafed and bombed the German columns as the Red Air Force firmly controlled the skies of the bulge of territory, referred to by both sides as "Belorussian Balcony", held by Army Group Center. Following the colossal bombardment, intended to shatter the forward defences of the 9th Army, troops of the Soviet 3rd Army launched their assault from Rogachev. They were met with obstinate resistance from the Germans in that sector and sustained heavy casualties, advancing little. Meanwhile, the sector under Rokossovsky met much less retaliation, as the lines around Parichi were not heavily guarded by the German troops. The Cavalry-Mechanised Group (KMG) under Pliev, consisting of the 4th Guards Cavalry Corps and the 1st Mechanised Corps, swept hastily across the edge of the Pripyet Marshes, subduing the German 9th Army troops defending Feste Platz Slutsk, cutting through the fortress, effectively hindering the bulk of the 9th Army's ability to flee through the south and ultimately sealing the fate of the unit. It was the ability of KMG Pliev to seize Slutsk and swing south against the 9th Army that truly showed the effectiveness of the combination of the anachronistic horse-mounted Soviet cavalrymen and the Soviet armoured formations in the form of the Cavalry-Mechanised Group in striking deep into the operational depth of the opponent, as envisaged by Marshal Mikhail Tukhachevsky's Deep Battle doctrine.

With the flanks secured by the Cavalry-Mechanised Group and the escape routes of the 9th Army severed, the Soviet 65th Army swung north and soon entered the fortress city of Bobruysk. Heavy fighting ensued, but the 65th Army was able to capture the stronghold by 29 June. The 9th Army was destroyed, unable to escape due to the fact that they had been cut off by the prior Soviet manoeuvres.

Due to the failures of the commander of Army Group Centre, Generalfeldmarschall Ernst Busch was forced to commit the 20th Panzer Division as a relief force to the 9th Army. Busch was sacked on the 28th by Adolf Hitler and replaced with the experienced master of defensive warfare, Walther Model.

The success of the Bobruysk Offensive was significant enough that Stalin began addressing Rokossovsky as Konstantin Konstantinovich as a sign of respect, a privilege that was only bestowed upon one other military officer, Boris Shaposhnikov. The vital victory at the crucial railway junction of Bobruysk also earned Rokossovsky the title of the Marshal of the Soviet Red Army, bringing the position and reputation of the former Gulag prisoner along those of Zhukov and Ivan Konev.

== Second phase: strategic offensive against Army Group Centre ==
The second phase of the operation involved the entire operation's most significant single objective: the retaking of Minsk, capital of the Byelorussian SSR. It would also complete the large-scale encirclement and destruction, set up by the first phase, of much of Army Group Centre.

=== Minsk offensive ===
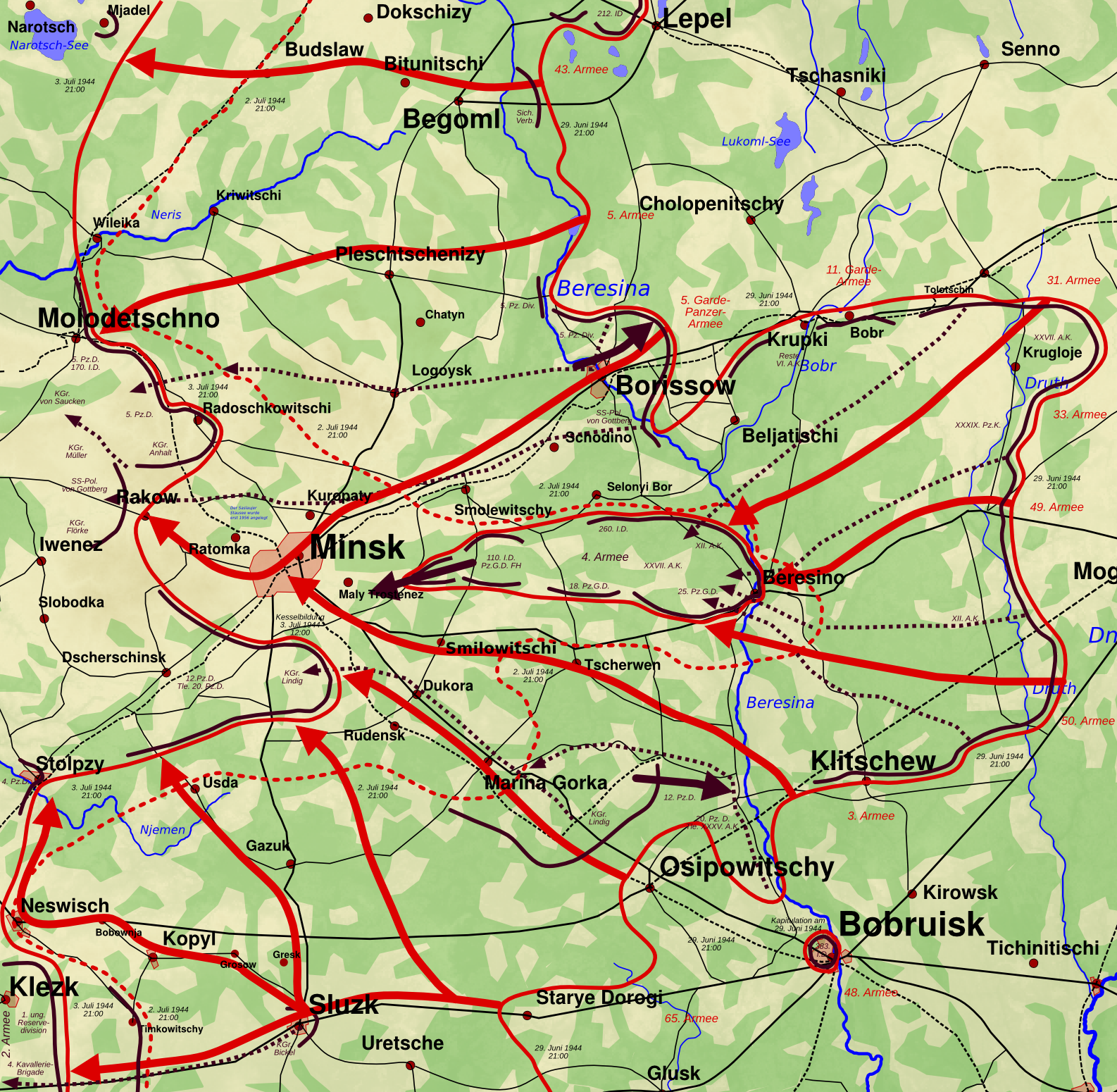
Map of the Minsk offensive, 29 June – 4 July

From 28 June, the main exploitation units of the 3rd Belorussian Front (the 5th Guards Tank Army and an attached cavalry-mechanised group) began to push on to secure crossings of the Berezina, followed by the 11th Guards Army. In the south, exploitation forces of the 1st Belorussian Front began to close the lower pincer of the trap developing around the German 4th Army. The Germans brought back the 5th Panzer Division into Byelorussia to cover the approaches to Minsk, while the units of 4th Army began to withdraw over the Berezina crossings, where they were pounded by heavy air bombardment. After forcing crossings of the Berezina, Soviet forces closed in on Minsk. The 2nd Guards Tank Corps was the first to break into the city in the early hours of 3 July; fighting erupted in the centre, which was finally cleared of German rearguards by the following day. The 5th Guards Tank Army and 65th Army closed the encirclement to the west of Minsk, trapping the entire German 4th Army, and many of the remnants of the 9th Army.

Over the next few days, the pocket east of Minsk was reduced: only a fraction of the 100,000 soldiers in it escaped. Minsk had been liberated, and Army Group Centre destroyed, in what was possibly the Wehrmacht's greatest defeat of the war. Between 22 June and 4 July 1944, Army Group Centre lost 25 divisions and 300,000 men. In the few subsequent weeks, the Germans lost another 100,000 men.

=== Polotsk offensive ===
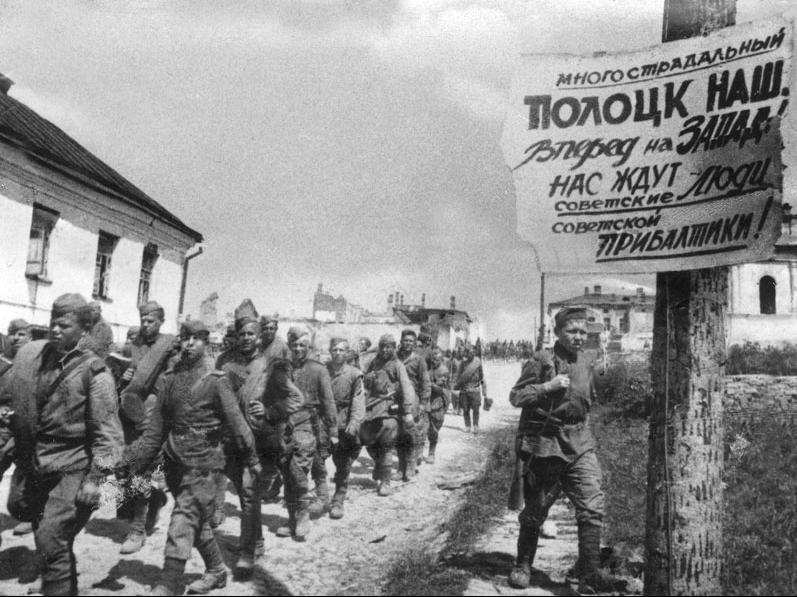
Soviet soldiers in Polotsk, 4 July 1944

The Polotsk offensive had the dual objective of taking Polotsk itself, and of screening the northern flank of the main Minsk Offensive against a possible German counter-offensive from Army Group North.

The 1st Baltic Front successfully pursued the retreating remnants of the 3rd Panzer Army back towards Polotsk, which was reached by 1 July. German forces attempted to organise a defense using rear-area support units and several divisions hurriedly transferred from Army Group North.

Units of the 1st Baltic Front's 4th Shock Army and 6th Guards Army fought their way into the city over the next few days, and successfully cleared it of German forces by 4 July.

== Third phase: strategic offensive operations in the north ==
As German resistance had almost completely collapsed, Soviet forces were ordered to push on as far as possible beyond the original objective of Minsk, and new objectives were issued by the Stavka. This resulted in a third phase of offensive operations, which should be regarded as a further part of Operation Bagration.

Model hoped to reestablish a defensive line running through Lida using what was left of the 3rd Panzer, 4th and 9th Armies along with new reinforcements.^{b}

=== Šiauliai offensive ===
The Šiauliai offensive covered the operations of the 1st Baltic Front between 5 and 31 July against the remnants of the 3rd Panzer Army. Its main objective was the Lithuanian city of Šiauliai.

The 43rd, 51st, and 2nd Guards Armies attacked towards Riga on the Baltic coast with 3rd Guards Mechanised Corps attached. By 31 July, the coast on the Gulf of Riga had been reached. 6th Guards Army covered Riga and the extended flank of the penetration towards the north.

A hurriedly organised German counter-attack restored the severed connection between the remnants of Army Group Centre and Army Group North. In August, the Germans attempted to retake Šiauliai in Operation Doppelkopf and Operation Cäsar, but they failed.

=== Vilnius offensive ===
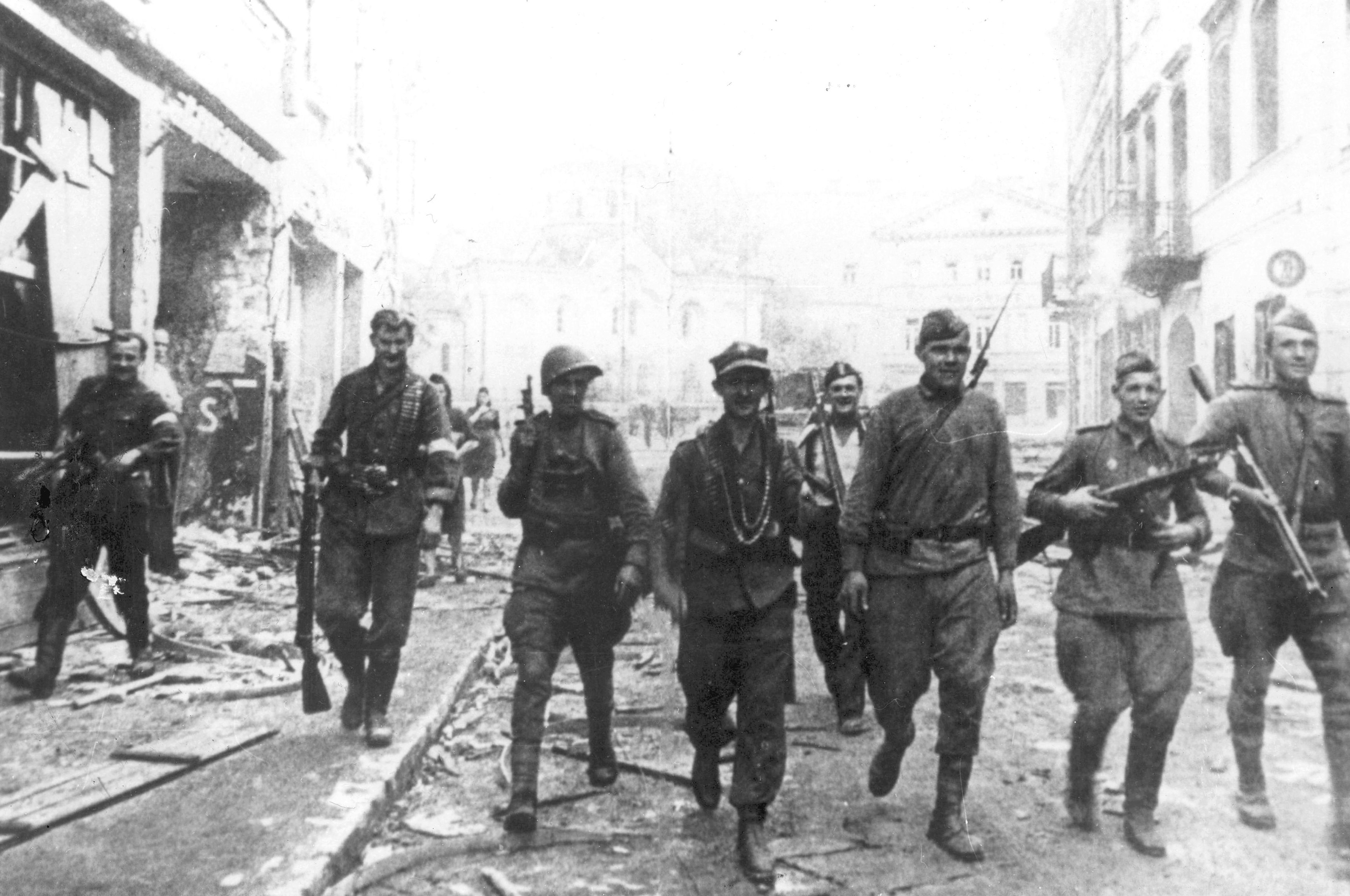
Soviet and Polish Armia Krajowa soldiers in Vilnius, July 1944

The Vilnius offensive was conducted by units of the 3rd Belorussian Front subsequent to their completion of the Minsk Offensive; they were opposed by the remnants of 3rd Panzer Army and the 4th Army.

Units of the 4th Army, principally the 5th Panzer Division, attempted to hold the key rail junction of Molodechno, but failed. It was taken by units of the 11th Guards Army, 5th Guards Tank Army and 3rd Guards Cavalry Corps on 5 July. German forces continued a precipitate retreat, and Soviet forces reached Vilnius, held by units of the 3rd Panzer Army, by 7 July.

By 8 July, the city had been encircled, trapping the garrison, who were ordered to hold fast at all costs. Soviet forces then fought their way into the city in intense street-by-street fighting (alongside an Armia Krajowa uprising, Operation Ostra Brama). On 12 July, 6th Panzer Division counter-attacked and temporarily opened an escape corridor for the besieged troops, but the majority of them were lost when the city fell on 13 July (this phase of the operation is commonly known as the Battle of Vilnius). On 23 July, the 4th Army commander, Hoßbach, in agreement with Model, committed the newly arrived 19th Panzer Division into a counter-attack with the intention of cutting off the Soviet spearheads in the Augustow Forest. This failed.

=== Belostok offensive ===
The Belostok offensive covered the operations of 2nd Belorussian Front between 5 and 27 July, with the objective of the Polish city of Białystok (Belostok). The 40th and 41st Rifle Corps of 3rd Army, on the front's left wing, took Białystok by storm on 27 July, after two days of fighting.

=== Lublin–Brest offensive ===
The Lublin–Brest offensive was carried out by Rokossovsky's 1st Belorussian Front between 18 July and 2 August, and developed the initial gains of Operation Bagration toward eastern Poland and the Vistula. The 47th and 8th Guards Armies reached the Bug River by 21 July, and the latter reached the eastern bank of the Vistula by 25 July. Lublin was taken on 24 July; the 2nd Tank Army was ordered to turn north, towards Warsaw, to cut off the retreat of forces from Army Group Centre in the Brest area. Brest was taken on 28 July and the Front's left wing seized bridgeheads over the Vistula by 2 August. This effectively completed the operation, the remainder of the summer being given over to defensive efforts against a series of German counter-attacks on the bridgeheads. The operation ended with the defeat of German Army Group North Ukraine and Soviet bridgeheads over the Vistula River west of Sandomierz.

=== Kaunas offensive ===
The Kaunas offensive covered the operations of Chernyakhovsky's 3rd Belorussian Front from 28 July to 28 August, towards the Lithuanian city of Kaunas, subsequent to their completion of the offensive against Vilnius. By 30 July all Wehrmacht resistance on the approaches to the Neman River had retreated or been annihilated. Two days later the city of Kaunas was under Soviet control.

=== Osovets offensive ===
This offensive covered the operations of 2nd Belorussian Front from 6–14 August, after their completion of the Belostock Offensive, with the objective of the fortified area at Osowiec on one of the tributaries of the Narew River. The very large fortress complex there secured the approaches to East Prussia through the region's marshes.

German forces were able to stabilise their line of defense along the Narew, which they held until the East Prussian offensive of January 1945.

== Aftermath ==
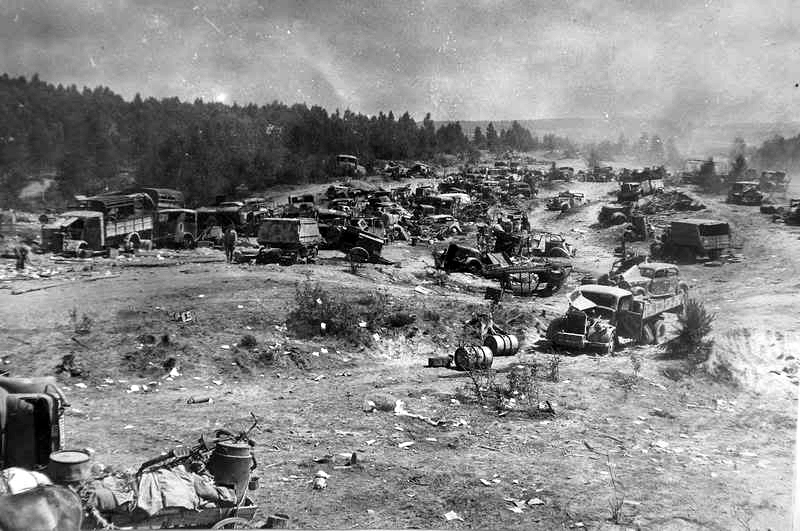
Abandoned vehicles of the German 9th Army at a road near Bobruisk

This was by far the greatest Soviet victory in numerical terms. The Red Army recaptured a vast amount of Soviet territory and occupied some Baltic and Polish territories whose population had suffered greatly under the German occupation. The advancing Soviets found cities destroyed, villages depopulated, and much of the population killed or deported by the occupiers. To show the outside world the magnitude of the victory, some 57,000 German prisoners, taken from the encirclement east of Minsk, were paraded through Moscow: even marching quickly and twenty abreast, they took 90 minutes to pass. This was later known as the Parade of the Vanquished.

The German army never recovered from the materiel and manpower losses sustained during this time, having lost about a quarter of its Eastern Front manpower, exceeding even the percentage of loss at Stalingrad (about 17 full divisions). These losses included many experienced soldiers, NCOs and commissioned officers, which at this stage of the war the Wehrmacht could not replace. According to German sources, Army Group Center suffered 27 divisions badly mauled; with 19 disbanded and 7 amalgamated to form just two divisions; losses were "far worse" than at Stalingrad, Tunis or Falaise.

An indication of the completeness of the Soviet victory is that 31 of the 47 German divisional or corps commanders involved were killed or captured. Of the German generals lost, nine were killed, including two corps commanders; 22 captured, including four corps commanders; Major-General Hans Hahne, commander of 197th Infantry Division, disappeared on 24 June, while Lieutenant-Generals Zutavern and Philipp of the 18th Panzergrenadier and 134th Infantry Divisions died by suicide.

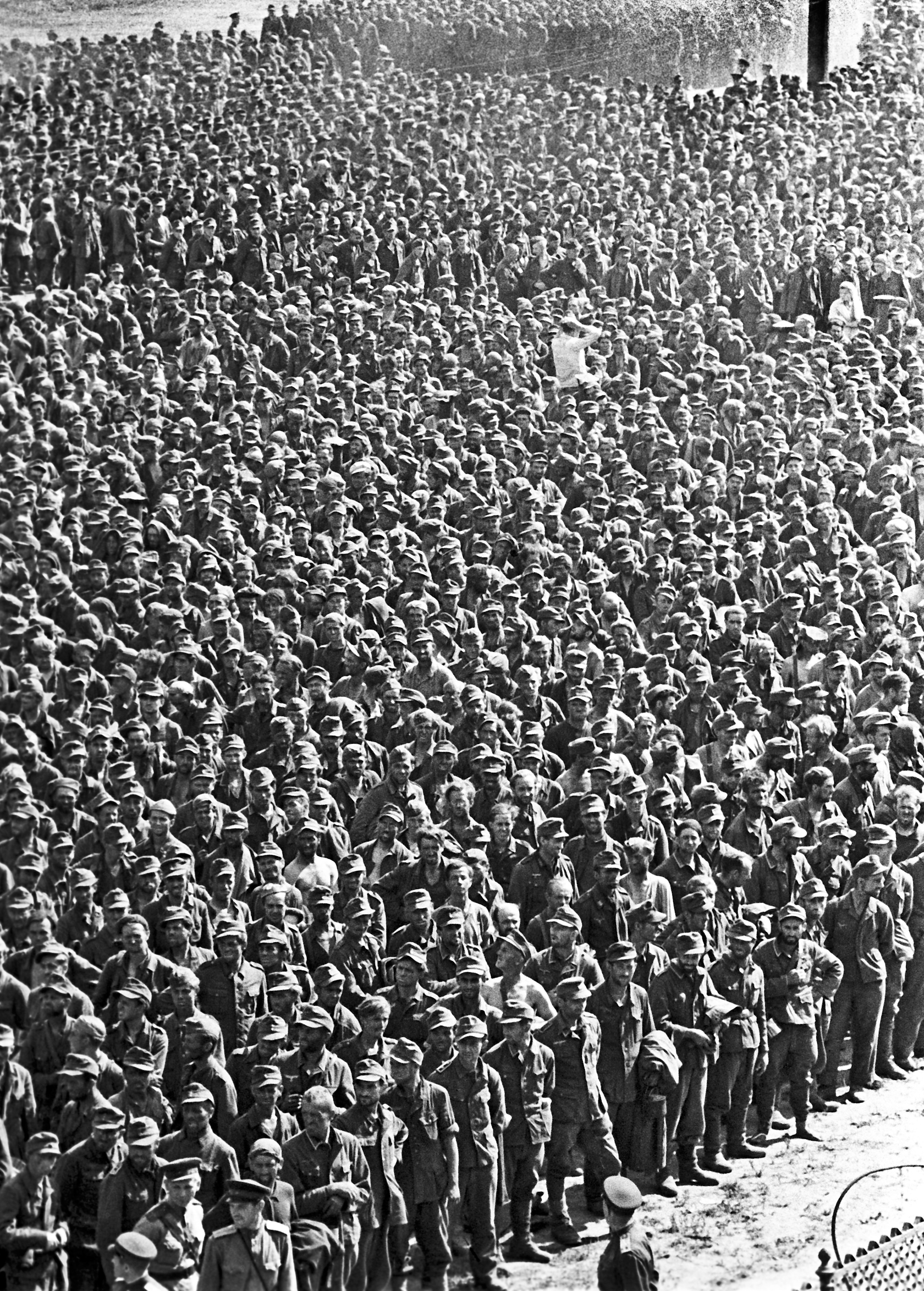
German prisoners of war paraded in Moscow, 15 July 1944

The near-total destruction of Army Group Centre was very costly for the Germans. Exact German losses are unknown but newer research indicates around 400,000–540,000 killed, missing or wounded. (Note: Figures for the exact casualties of the German forces during Operation Bagration vary significantly. Wartime Soviet estimates claim 540,000 German overall casualties (including 158,480 captured), with material losses listed at 2,375 tanks, 8,702 guns, 631 aircraft, and 57,152 motor vehicles. Western estimates put German casualties lower at about 300,000–350,000 men. Newer research done by the MGFA and led by historian Karl Heinz Frieser put German casualties at 399,102 soldiers.) Soviet losses were also substantial, with 180,040 killed and missing, 590,848 wounded and sick, together with 2,957 tanks, 2,447 artillery pieces and 822 aircraft also lost. The offensive cut off Army Group North and Army Group North Ukraine from each other and weakened them as resources were diverted to the central sector. This forced both Army Groups to withdraw from Soviet territory much more quickly when faced with the following Soviet offensives in their sectors.

The end of Operation Bagration coincided with the destruction of many of the strongest units of the Wehrmacht engaged against the Allies on the Western Front in the Falaise pocket in Normandy, during Operation Overlord. After these victories, supply problems rather than German resistance slowed the Allies' advance. The Germans transferred armoured units from the Italian front, where they could afford to give ground, to resist the Soviet advance near Warsaw.

This was one of the largest Soviet operations of World War II with 2.3 million troops engaged, three Axis armies eliminated and vast amounts of Soviet territory recaptured. In Soviet propaganda, this offensive was listed as one of Stalin's ten blows.

== Citations ==
=== Bibliography ===
- Adair, Paul (2004) [1994]. Hitler's Greatest Defeat: The collapse of Army Group Centre, June 1944. Weidenfeld Military. ISBN 1854092324.
- Citino, Robert (2017). The Wehrmacht's Last Stand: The German Campaigns of 1944–1945. University Press of Kansas. ISBN 978-0700624942.
- Connor, William M. (1987). "Analysis of Deep Attack Operations: Operation Bagration, Belorussia, 22 June – 29 August 1944" (PDF). Fort Leavenworth, KS: Combat Studies Institute. Archived from the original (PDF) on 7 November 2010.
- Dunn, Walter S. (2000). Soviet Blitzkrieg: The Battle for White Russia, 1944. Lynne Riener. ISBN 978-1555878801.
- Erickson, John (1989) [1983]. The Road to Berlin, Stalin's War with Germany, Volume 2. Yale University Press. ISBN 0-300-07813-7.
- Frieser, Karl-Heinz; Schmider, Klaus; Schönherr, Klaus; Schreiber, Gerhard; Ungváry, Kristián; Wegner, Bernd (2007). Das Deutsche Reich und der Zweite Weltkrieg: Die Ostfront 1943/44 – Der Krieg im Osten und an den Nebenfronten [Germany and the Second World War: The Eastern Front 1943/44 - The War in the East and on the Neighbouring Fronts] (in German). Vol. VIII. München: Deutsche Verlags-Anstalt. ISBN 978-3421062352.
- Glantz, David M. (1989). Soviet Military Deception in the Second World War. London: Frank Cass. ISBN 071463347X.
- Glantz, David M. (2002). The Battle for L'vov, July 1944. Routledge Press. ISBN 978-0714652016.
- Glantz, David M.; House, Jonathan (1995). When Titans Clashed: How the Red Army Stopped Hitler. Lawrence: University Press of Kansas. ISBN 0700608990.
- Glantz, David; Orenstein, Harold S. (2004). Belorussia 1944. Routledge. ISBN 978-0-203-30920-9.
- Krivosheev, G. F. (1997). Soviet Casualties and Combat Losses in the Twentieth Century. London: Greenhill Books. ISBN 1853672807.
- Liedtke, Gregory (2015), "Lost in the Mud: The (Nearly) Forgotten Collapse of the German Army in the Western Ukraine, March and April 1944.", The Journal of Slavic Military Studies, 28: 215–238, doi:10.1080/13518046.2015.998134
- Niepold, Gerd (1987). Battle for White Russia: The Destruction of Army Group Centre June 1944. Translated by Simpkin, R. London: Brassey's. ISBN 008033606X.
- Watt, Robert N. (December 2008). "Feeling the Full Force of a Four Front Offensive: Re-Interpreting the Red Army's 1944 Belorussian and L'vov-Peremshyl' Operations". The Journal of Slavic Military Studies. 21 (4). Routledge Taylor & Francis Group: 669–705. doi:10.1080/13518040802497564. S2CID 143413006.
- Willmott, H. P. (1984). June, 1944. Blandford Press. ISBN 0713714468.
- Zaloga, S. (1996). Bagration 1944: The Destruction of Army Group Centre. Osprey. ISBN 978-1855324787.
- Ziemke, Earl F. (1969). Battle For Berlin: End of the Third Reich. London: Macdonald.
- Zimmerman, Joshua D. (2015). The Polish Underground and the Jews, 1939–1945. London & New York: Cambridge University Press. ISBN 978-1108432740.
