= 11th Guards Army =

Field army of the Red Army

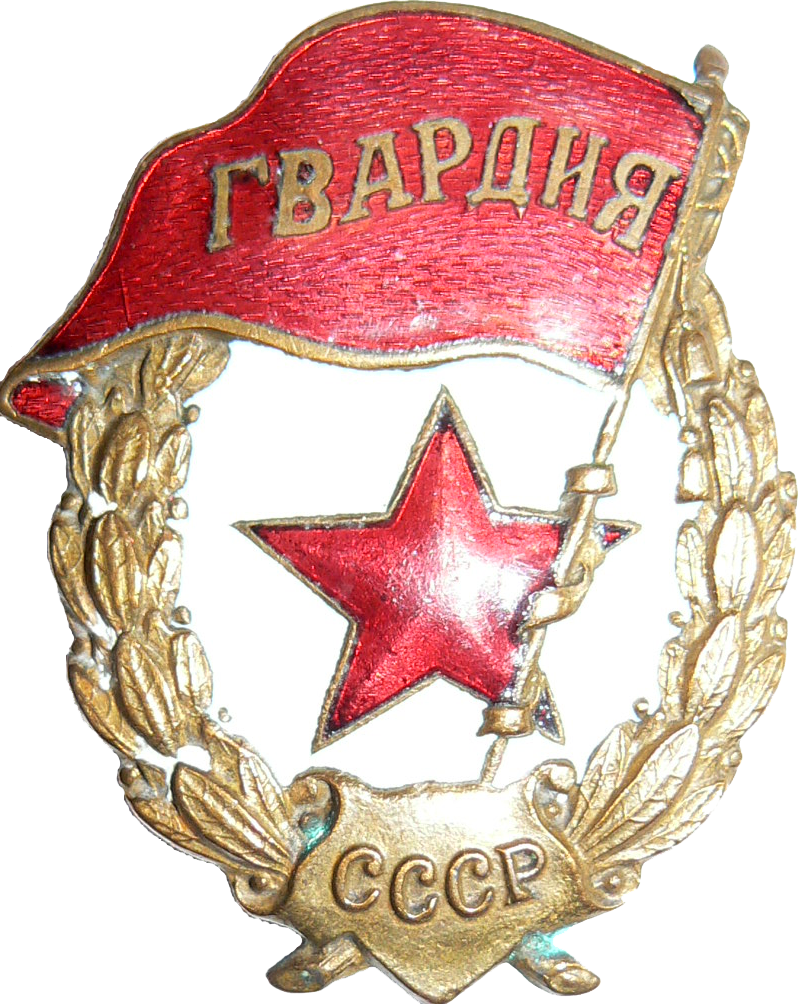
- Active: 1943–1997
- Disbanded: Redesignated as Ground and Coastal Defence Forces of the Baltic Fleet
- Country: Soviet Union; Russia
- Branch: Red Army (Soviet Ground Forces from 1946); Russian Ground Forces
- Type: Field army
- Headquarters: Kaliningrad (1945–1997)
- Engagements: Operation Kutuzov; Briyansk; Gorodok; Operation Bagration; Gumbinnen Operation; East Prussian Offensive; Battle of Königsberg; Warsaw Pact invasion of Czechoslovakia
- Decorations: Order of the Red Banner

Commanders
- Notable commanders: Ivan Bagramyan; Kuzma Galitsky

The 11th Guards Army (Russian: 11-я гвардейская армия) was a field army of the Red Army, the Soviet Ground Forces, and the Russian Ground Forces, active from 1943 to 1997.

== History ==
=== World War II ===
For its prowess in battle, the second formation of the 16th Army was redesignated as the 11th Guards Army on 1 May 1943 in accordance with a Stavka directive of 16 April, under the command of Lieutenant General Ivan Bagramyan, who was promoted to colonel general on 27 August. The army included the 8th and 16th Guards Rifle Corps and one rifle division directly controlled by the army headquarters. On 1 June 1943 the 11th Guards Army consisted of the 8th Guards Rifle Corps (11th, 26th and 83rd Guards Rifle Divisions), 16th Guards Rifle Corps (1st, 16th & 31st Guards, and 169th Rifle Divisions), and the 5th, 18th, and 84th Guards and the 108th and 217th Rifle Divisions, several artillery divisions, armoured units, and other support units.

The army fought in Operation Kutuzov, during which it included the 8th, 16th, and 36th Guards Rifle Corps, the 5th Tank Corps and the 108th Rifle Division. Beginning the offensive on 12 July as part of the Western Front, the army broke through the main and reserve defensive lines of the German forces by the end of the first day. It advanced 70 kilometers by 19 July, threatening the line of communications of the German forces around Oryol. The 11th Guards Army transferred to the Bryansk Front on 30 July and continued the offensive to the south and southwest, contributing to the defeat of the German troops south of Oryol.

The army became part of the Baltic Front (the 2nd Baltic from 20 October) on 15 October, and on 18 November was transferred to the 1st Baltic Front. Bagramyan was promoted and briefly replaced by Major General Alexander Ksenofontov in November, and then Lieutenant General Kuzma Galitsky (promoted to colonel general on 28 June 1944), who commanded the army for the rest of the war. The army was withdrawn to the Reserve of the Supreme High Command on 22 April 1944 and returned to the front as part of the 3rd Belorussian Front on 27 May. During the Minsk and Vilnius Offensives of Operation Bagration, the army, in conjunction with other units, took Orsha, Borisov, Molodechno, Alytus, and crossed the Neman. During October, the army broke through the German defenses on the approaches to East Prussia and reached the border of the latter, then advanced into the German border defenses, and advanced 70 kilometers after expanding the breakthrough to 75 kilometers. During the East Prussian Offensive of 1945, the army entered battle from the second echelon, defeated the German troops around Insterburg, reached the Frisches Haff, and besieged Königsberg from the south. The army was transferred to the 1st Baltic Front on 13 February and on 25 February became part of the Samland Group of Forces of the 3rd Belarusian Front. The 11th Guards fought in the taking of the city in early April, ending the Battle of Königsberg. During the Samland Offensive, the army captured Pillau on 25 April and completed the defeat of the German forces in Samland on the Frische Nehrung.

It also fought in the Bryansk, Gorodok, and Gumbinnen Offensives.

=== Postwar ===
In July 1945, the army headquarters was used to form the headquarters of the Special Military District. On 26 February 1946, the headquarters of the district was redesignated the headquarters of the army, part of the Baltic Military District. When reformed, the army consisted of the same corps it ended the war with – the 8th Guards at Chernyakhovsk, the 16th Guards at Kaliningrad, and the 36th Guards at Gusev (later Chernyakhovsk). The 84th Guards Rifle Division of the 36th Corps was disbanded during the year, and in the winter and spring the 31st Guards Rifle Division of the 16th Corps and the 18th Guards Rifle Division of the 36th Corps became the 29th and 30th Guards Mechanized Divisions, respectively. In June 1946, the 8th Guards was transferred to the Soviet airborne and relocated to Polotsk, and its 11th and 83rd Guards Rifle Divisions were disbanded.

From the end of 1946 to 1956, the 11th Guards Army included the 16th Guards Rifle Corps with the 1st and 16th Guards Rifle Divisions, and the 28th Guards Mechanized Division, the 36th Guards Rifle Corps with the 5th and 26th Guards Rifle Divisions, and the 30th Guards Mechanized Division, and the independent 1st Tank Division (the former tank corps of the same number). Colonel General Pavel Batov commanded the army between 1950 and 1954. In the summer of 1956, the 10th Rifle Corps arrived from the Ural Military District; the 26th Guards Rifle Division and 71st Mechanized Division (from Ivanovo) were subordinated to it. In the spring of 1957, all of the army's Guards Rifle Divisions and the 30th Guards and 71st Mechanized Divisions were redesignated as motor rifle divisions, retaining their numbers except for the 71st, which became the 119th. The 28th Guards Mechanized Division became the 40th Guards Tank Division. During the late 1950s the army's corps were disbanded, along with the 5th and 16th Guards Motor Rifle Divisions. In November 1964, the 30th Guards became the 18th Guards, and the 119th became the 265th, although the latter had by then transferred to the Soviet Far East.

Major unit headquarters locations in the late 1980s

For the rest of the Cold War, the army's organization remained mostly unchanged. On 22 February 1968, it was awarded the Order of the Red Banner on the 50th anniversary of the Soviet Armed Forces. In August of that year, the 18th Guards Motor Rifle Division participated in the Warsaw Pact invasion of Czechoslovakia and upon its conclusion joined the Central Group of Forces in Czechoslovakia. Henceforth, the army included four divisions: the 1st (based at Kaliningrad) and 26th (Gusev) Guards Motor Rifle, and the 40th Guards (Sovetsk) and 1st (Kaliningrad) Tank. The tank divisions were maintained at a higher strength than the motor rifle divisions, and the 1st Guards Motor Rifle was maintained at a reduced strength with virtually no artillery and very few armored vehicles. On 28 August 1988, the rocket battalions of the army's divisions were used to form the 463rd Rocket Brigade, directly subordinated to army headquarters.

== Decline of the USSR ==
As the size of Soviet forces was reduced towards the end of the Cold War, the 26th Division was downsized into the 5190th Guards Weapons and Equipment Storage Base in September 1989. When Soviet troops withdrew from Eastern Europe in 1991, the 18th Guards Motor Rifle Division returned to Gusev, after which the 5190th Guards Base was disbanded, and the 11th Guards Rocket Brigade arrived in Chernyakhovsk.

By early 1991, the 11th Guards Army included 620 tanks, 753 BMPs and BTRs, 239 guns, mortars, and multiple rocket launchers, 71 attack helicopters, and 38 transport helicopters.

In September 1993 the 1st Tank Division was reduced into the 2nd Independent Tank Brigade.

On 19 November 1993 the 40th Guards Tank Division at Sovetsk in the Kaliningrad Oblast was reduced in status to become the 10th Guards Tank Brigade. The 11th Guards Army was disbanded on 1 February 1997 by being redesignated the Ground and Coastal Defence Forces of the Baltic Fleet.

In June 1997 the 10th Guards Tank Brigade was renamed the 196th Guards Weapons and Equipment Storage Base. The storage base was disbanded itself in 2008. In 1998 the 2nd Independent Tank Brigade became the 385th VKhVT.

== Commanders of the Army ==
The following generals commanded the army.

- Lieutenant General Ivan Bagramyan (17 April – 15 November 1943)
- Major General Alexander Ksenofontov (16–25 November 1943)
- Colonel General Kuzma Galitsky (26 November 1943 – 24 October 1946)
- Colonel General Alexander Gorbatov (25 October 1946 – 27 March 1950)
- Colonel General Pavel Batov (27 March 1950 – 8 June 1954)
- Colonel General Pyotr Koshevoy (8 June 1954 – 15 July 1955)
- Lieutenant General Iosif Gusakovsky (15 July 1955 – 16 April 1958)
- Major General (promoted to Lieutenant General 25 May 1959) Yefim Marchenko (16 April 1958 – 23 September 1960)
- Colonel General Mikhail Povaly (23 September 1960 – 13 December 1961)
- Major General (promoted to Lieutenant General 27 April 1962) Khachik Hamparian (13 December 1961 – 19 March 1966)
- Major General (promoted to Lieutenant General 23 February 1967) Alexander Altunin (19 March 1966 – 28 June 1968)
- Lieutenant General Yury Naumenko (28 June 1968 – 16 October 1971)
- Lieutenant General Dmitry Sukhorukov (4 November 1971 – 20 March 1974)
- Major General (promoted to Lieutenant General 14 February 1977) Alexander Ivanov (20 March 1974 – March 1979)
- Major General (promoted to Lieutenant General 5 May 1980) Yury Petrov (March 1979 – July 1982)
- Major General (promoted to Lieutenant General 28 April 1984) Vladimir Platov (July 1982 – 1984)
- Major General Georgy Saburov (1984)
- Lieutenant General Fedor Melnychuk (1984–1988)
- Major General Yury Grekov (1988 – 4 January 1989)
- Lieutenant General Anatoly Koretsky (1989–1991)
- Lieutenant General Andrey Nikolaev (February–July 1992)
- Guards General Lieutenant Anatoli Pimenov (Пименов, Анатолий Иванович) (1992–1997)
