= Kuzma Galitsky =

Soviet military general

Kuzma Nikitovich Galitsky
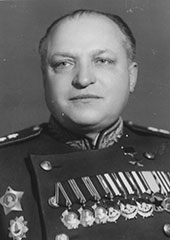
- Born: 24 October 1897; Taganrog, Russian Empire
- Died: 14 March 1973 (aged 75); Moscow, USSR
- Burial place: Novodevichy Cemetery
- Military career
- Allegiance: USSR
- Branch: Soviet Army
- Service years: 1917–1962
- Rank: Army General
- Commands: 24th Rifle Division (1939–1941); 67th Rifle Corps; 3rd Shock Army (Soviet Union) (1942–1943); 11th Guards Army (1943–1945); Northern Group of Forces (1955–1958); Transcaucasian Military District (1958–1961)
- Conflicts: Russian Civil War; World War II; Winter War; Eastern Front
- Awards: Hero of the Soviet Union

Kuzma Nikitovich Galitsky (Russian: Кузьма́ Ники́тович Гали́цкий; 24 October 1897 – 14 March 1973) was a Soviet army general who earned the title Hero of the Soviet Union.

== Biography ==
Kuzma Galitsky was born on 24 October 1897 in the city of Taganrog into a worker's family. He studied at the Taganrog Boys Gymnasium, which he graduated from in 1912, and worked at the Taganrog Train Station's depot. Galitsky joined the Bolshevik Party in 1918.

During the German-Soviet War, he commanded the 24th Rifle Division and the 67th Rifle Corps. Starting in September 1942, he commanded the 3rd Shock Army (Soviet Union), and from November 1943 to May 1945 he commanded of the 11th Guards Army. General Galitsky's army finished the war in Eastern Prussia, in Königsberg (currently Kaliningrad), where he built the first memorial in the Soviet Union to soldiers who fell during the war.

He was elected to the Supreme Soviet of the Soviet Union, serving from 1946 to 1962, concurrently serving as the commanding officer of the Northern Group of Forces in 1955–1958 and the Transcaucasian Military District in 1958–1961.

He died in Moscow in 1973 and was buried at the Novodevichy Cemetery.

== Awards ==
- Hero of the Soviet Union (with "Gold Star» № 5036)
- Four Orders of Lenin
- Order of the Red Banner, four times
- Order of Suvorov, 1st class
- Order of Kutuzov, 1st class
- Order of Bogdan Khmelnitsky (Soviet Union), 1st class
- Order of the Red Star
- Jubilee Medal "In Commemoration of the 100th Anniversary of the Birth of Vladimir Ilyich Lenin"
- Medal "For the Victory over Germany in the Great Patriotic War 1941–1945"
- Jubilee Medal "Twenty Years of Victory in the Great Patriotic War 1941–1945"
- Medal "For the Capture of Königsberg"
- Jubilee Medal "XX Years of the Workers' and Peasants' Red Army"
- Jubilee Medal "30 Years of the Soviet Army and Navy"
- Jubilee Medal "40 Years of the Armed Forces of the USSR"
- Jubilee Medal "50 Years of the Armed Forces of the USSR"

== Bibliography (memoirs) ==
- «Годы суровых испытаний. 1941–1944 (записки командующего армией)»— М.: Наука, 1973.
- «В боях за Восточную Пруссию. Записки командующего 11-й гвардейской армией» — М.: Наука, 1970.

== Commemoration ==
Streets in Taganrog and in Kaliningrad were named after General Galitsky.

== External links and references ==
- Kuzma Galitsky at War Heroes web site
