= 87th Guards Rifle Division =

87th Guards Rifle Division (16 April 1943 – July 1946) 87th Guards Rifle Division (October 1953 - June 1957) 87th Guards Motor Rifle Division (June 1957 - March 1959)
- Maj. Gen. Kirill Yakovlevich Tymchik
- Active: 1943–1946, 1953-1959
- Country: Soviet Union
- Branch: Red Army
- Type: Division
- Role: Infantry
- Engagements: Donbas strategic offensive Lower Dniepr Offensive; Crimean Offensive; Operation Bagration; Šiauliai Offensive; Courland Pocket; East Prussian Offensive; Battle of Königsberg
- Decorations: Order of the Red Banner; Order of Suvorov
- Battle honours: Stalino; Sevastopol

Commanders
- Notable commanders: Maj. Gen. Kirill Yakovlevich Tymchik

The 87th Guards Rifle Division was created on 16 April 1943 from the veterans of the 300th Rifle Division, in recognition of that division's leading role in the penetration of the German/Romanian defenses south of Stalingrad in the opening stages of Operation Uranus, its subsequent defense against Army Group Don's attempt to relieve the German Sixth Army at Stalingrad, and later for its pursuit of the defeated German forces along the Don River to Rostov-na-Donu as far as the Mius River. The 87th Guards continued a record of distinguished service through the rest of the Great Patriotic War, first in the southern sector of the front, where it participated in the liberation of the Donbas region and the Crimea, and then, after a major redeployment, in the north-central sector, advancing through the Baltic states and into East Germany. After the war it was restructured into a rifle brigade, before being reestablished as 87th Guards Rifle Division in October 1953. In June 1957, it was reorganized as a motor rifle division, but appears to have been disbanded in 1959.

== Formation ==
The 87th Guards was one of the last Guards rifle divisions created in the aftermath of the fighting for Stalingrad. When formed, its order of battle was as follows:

- 261st Guards Rifle Regiment from 1049th Rifle Regiment
- 262nd Guards Rifle Regiment from 1051st Rifle Regiment
- 264th Guards Rifle Regiment from 1053rd Rifle Regiment
- 192nd Guards Artillery Regiment from 822nd Artillery Regiment
- 94th Guards Antitank Battalion from 336th Antitank Battalion
- 90th Guards Reconnaissance Company
- 100th Guards Sapper Battalion from 591st Sapper Battalion
- 120th Guards Signal Company from 756th Signal Battalion (later 120th Guards Signal Battalion)
- 95th Guards Medical/Sanitation Battalion
- 91st Guards Chemical Defense (Anti-gas) Company
- 93rd Guards Motor Transport Company
- 89th Guards Field Bakery
- 88th Guards Divisional Veterinary Hospital
- 972nd Field Postal Station
- 856th Field Office of the State Bank

The division spent the rest of April and May rebuilding, in the 13th Guards Rifle Corps of the 2nd Guards Army. It remained in this Corps for the duration of the war, and in this Army for the duration apart from two re-deployments late in the war.

== Mius River and Donbas operation ==
While rebuilding, and for several months thereafter, the 87th Guards was occupied in positional warfare along the line of the Mius River. The German forces facing them, including the re-created 6th Army, occupied defensive positions they had originally built a year earlier. The first major effort to break this line began on 17 July; the 13th Guards Rifle Corps, in second echelon, crossed into a constricted bridgehead on the 21st, trying to stage a breakthrough in the area of the village of Dmitrievka. This proved unsuccessful and indeed turned into a rout, which once again cost Lt. Gen. Yakov Kreizer his command of 2nd Guards Army.

The following month Southern Front began a much more successful offensive into the Donbas region. The 87th Guards breakthrough came at the village of Uspenka and by 6 September it entered the city of Stalino (today Donetsk), for which it won its first honorific:

"STALINO...87th Guards Rifle Division (Col. Tymchik, Kirill Yakovlevich)... The troops that participated in the liberation of the Donbas, during which they captured Stalino and other cities, by order of the Supreme High Command on 8 September 1943, are given congratulations, and in Moscow a salute was given with 20 artillery salvos of 224 guns."

In the third week of September the German Wotan Line along the Molochnaya River was reached and soon breached, and the division continued its pursuit to the mouth of the Dniepr River, arriving at the town of Tsyurupinsk on 3 November. In the course of these operations 4th Ukrainian Front (formerly Southern Front) cut land access to Crimea, isolating German 17th Army and its allied Romanian forces, which were to become the Front's next targets.

== Crimean Offensive ==
Following a relatively quiet winter the 87th Guards participated in the Crimean Offensive. The division's task was to break through German positions across the low and narrow Isthmus of Perekop, beginning on 6 April 1944. In the initial fighting the German forces were pushed out of their first line of trenches, at considerable cost, but no breakthrough was made. During the night the 261st Guards Rifle Regiment was withdrawn from the line and began a long flanking march to the shore of Karkinit Bay, which was just knee-deep at this point. After wading for 20 minutes the regiment reached the opposite shore, outflanking the Germans and forcing them to fall back several kilometres. This set up a running fight down the west coast of Crimea, and by 20 April the division reached the city of Evpatoriya. On 9 May the city of Sevastopol was liberated, and the 87th was awarded its second honorific:

"SEVASTOPOL...87th Guards Rifle Division (Col. Tymchik, Kirill Yakovlevich)... The troops that participated in the liberation of Sevastopol, by order of the Supreme High Command on 10 May 1944, are given congratulations, and in Moscow a salute was given with 24 artillery salvos of 324 guns."

Following the victory in the Crimea, 2nd Guards Army was railed all the way north to 1st Baltic Front, where it arrived shortly after the start of Operation Bagration.

== Šiauliai Offensive ==
2nd Guards Army began to deploy in its new Front in mid-July, when the German lines had already fallen to pieces along the entire operational front. Advancing into the "Baltic Gap" in Lithuania between German Army Groups North and Center, the 87th Guards encountered limited resistance until it reached well dug-in positions along the Dubysa River in mid-August; this led to a halt for several weeks, followed by three unsuccessful attempts to break this line in September. The stalemate was finally broken by a full-scale Front offensive beginning on 6 October, and on 23 October the division reached the Niemen River opposite the city of Tilsit (today Sovetsk). Orders to assault the city by storm were countermanded on 30 October, and instead the division was re-deployed 200km northeast into Latvia to help contain the German forces trapped in the Courland Pocket.

== East Prussian Offensive ==
The 87th Guards rejoined 2nd Guards Army, now in 3rd Belorussian Front, in late December, prior to the East Prussian Offensive. The division remained in this Front for the duration. In early January the division moved to 39th Army with its Corps.

During January the division advanced against mixed opposition towards Königsberg (today Kaliningrad). In early February, approaching the German naval base of Pillau (today Baltiysk) the division suddenly faced strong counter-attacks from German forces evacuated from Courland, forcing a retreat with heavy losses. An attempt to stem the German attack on 23 February ended in a rout. Finally, on the night of 28 February/1 March, the division brought the German advance to a halt at Hill 111.4, also known as the Bismarckturm. The division was taken out of the front lines for rebuilding for the next month. It was redeployed to 43rd Army in the Zemland Operational Group holding the ground between Königsberg and the Baltic coast.

In the lead-up to the storming of Königsberg, the 87th Guards formed assault detachments based on single rifle battalions backed by regimental guns and also SU-76 assault guns from the 94th Guards Antitank Battalion. The attack began on 6 April. The assault detachments bypassed the forts of the inner defenses to reach the city center. In the afternoon of 8 April elements of the division linked up with 1st Guards Rifle Division of 11th Guards Army across the Pregel River, thus splitting the German defense in two. The next day the defenders of the city surrendered.

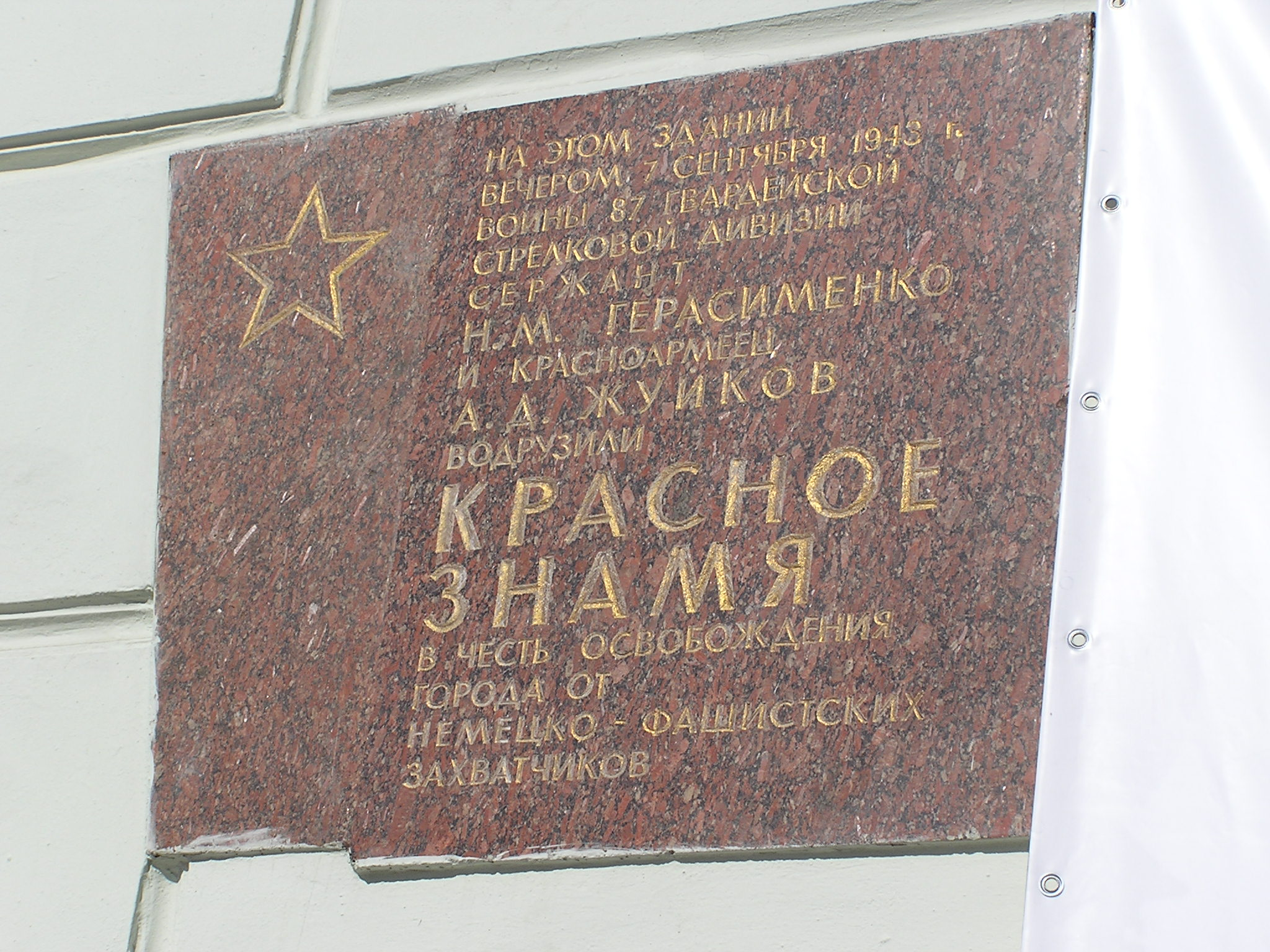
Memorial plaque in Donetsk to soldiers of the 87th Guards

In the wake of this battle the division moved back to Pillau, and later in the month it returned, with its Corps, to 2nd Guards Army. On 9 May the victory over Nazi Germany was celebrated in the city's main square. At this time the division was officially designated as the 87th Guards Rifle, Stalino, Sevastopol, Order of the Red Banner, Order of Suvorov, Division, and three men had been named as Heroes of the Soviet Union, all posthumously.

== Postwar ==
In the summer of 1945 the 13th Guards Rifle Corps was relocated to Smolensk Oblast. The division was based at Kaluga and moved to Dorogobuzh in May 1946. In the summer of 1946 it became the 18th Guards Rifle Brigade. In October 1953 it became the 87th Guards Rifle Division again. On 5 June 1957 the division became a motor rifle division. The division may have been disbanded on 1 March 1959.
