= Kantemir Tsalikov =

Ossetian Red Army commander (1908–1944

Kantemir Aleksandrovich Tsalikov
- Tsalikov, 1943
- Born: 10 April 1908; Nogkau, Terek Oblast, Russian Empire
- Died: 21 July 1944 (aged 36); Near Dudy, Ukmergė County, Lithuania
- Military career
- Allegiance: Soviet Union
- Branch: Red Army
- Service years: 1929–1944
- Rank: Major general
- Commands: 377th Rifle Division; 3rd Guards Rifle Division; 13th Guards Rifle Corps
- Conflicts: World War II †
- Awards: Order of the Red Banner (2); Order of Suvorov, 2nd class; Order of Kutuzov, 2nd class; Order of the Patriotic War, 1st class

Kantemir Aleksandrovich Tsalikov (Russian: Кантемир Александрович Цаликов; Iron Ossetic: Цæлыккаты Ахберды фырт Хъантемыр; 10 April 1908 – 21 July 1944) was an Ossetian Red Army major general who held division and corps command during World War II.

Tsalikov served as a junior officer in the early 1930s and held staff positions after graduating from the Frunze Military Academy. A division chief of staff when Operation Barbarossa began, he became a regimental commander in the first weeks of the war and was decorated for his performance. As a result, Tsalikov was given command of the 377th Rifle Division, which he led in operations to relieve the Siege of Leningrad. In late 1942 he was appointed commander of the 3rd Guards Rifle Division, leading it in the Soviet counteroffensive at Stalingrad. Tsalikov was decorated for his leadership of the division in the latter, the Donbas Strategic Offensive, and the Crimean Offensive. He rose to command the 13th Guards Rifle Corps after the end of the Crimean Offensive, but was killed by a mine during the Šiauliai Offensive in mid-1944.

== Early life and prewar service ==
An Ossetian, Tsalikov was born on 10 April 1908 in the village of Nogkau, Terek Oblast. He joined the Red Army in October 1929 and became a cadet at the Transcaucasian Infantry School. Following his graduation in March 1932, Tsalikov was posted to the 240th Rifle Regiment of the 80th Rifle Division in the Ukrainian Military District, where he served as a rifle and training platoon commander and as commander and political officer of a company. Awarded the Order of the Red Star in 1934 for successes in combat training, he began advanced studies at the Frunze Military Academy in May 1935 and after his graduation in August 1938 was appointed senior assistant section chief of the 1st staff department of the Far Eastern Front. This post proved brief and a month later Tsalikov became chief of staff of the 1st Separate Rifle Brigade of the 1st Red Banner Army, before being transferred west in October 1939 to serve as chief of staff of the 176th Rifle Division, which became part of the 35th Rifle Corps of the Odessa Military District.

== World War II ==
After Operation Barbarossa began, Tsalikov and his unit fought in Bessarabia with the 9th Army of the Southern Front. Defending positions on the east bank of the Prut, the division faced the German and Romanian advance southwest of Kishinev. During the fighting, Tsalikov, by now a major, assumed command of the 591st Rifle Regiment of the 176th after its commander was wounded. He was awarded the Order of the Red Banner for his "bravery and courage" in the fighting near Skulyany and "skillful organization" of the crossing of the Dniester by the 591st and 300th Artillery Regiments of the division.

In September, Tsalikov was sent to the Ural Military District to command the 377th Rifle Division, forming in the camps at Chebarkul. The division was railed to the front during November and the first half of December to join the 39th Army in reserve near Tikhvin. The 377th was soon transferred to the 4th Army on the Volkhov Front and from 21 December fought in the Tikhvin Offensive, fighting in the area of Moshki, Nikitino, Moiseyevo, and Zarechye. In January it bypassed German forces to reach the east bank of the Volkhov south of Kirishi, where it crossed the river and entrenched on the opposite bank. Shifted to the 59th Army, the 377th fought in the Lyuban Offensive beginning on 28 January and four days later cut roads in the German rear. Reaching the line of Maloye Opochivalovo by 6 February, it was ordered to strike southwest to exploit the successful advance of the 378th Rifle Division. The offensive stalled in late February, by which time the division had advanced as far as the line of Hill 28.3 and Mikhalevo. For his "skillful leadership" of the division in these operations, Tsalikov was awarded a second Order of the Red Banner. For the next several months the division defended positions on the Polist.

Appointed commander of the 3rd Guards Rifle Division of the 2nd Shock Army in September 1942, Tsalikov was transferred with the division to the Stalingrad Front to join the 2nd Guards Army in mid-December following nearly two months in reserve near Sinyavino. The division repulsed the German attack in Operation Winter Storm and on 24 December went on the offensive. Breaking through stubborn Axis resistance, the 3rd Guards crossed the Manych on 19 January 1943 and reached the Don in the North Caucasus Offensive. In the subsequent Rostov Offensive, the division captured the northern part of Novocherkassk with an attack from the north and northeast and pursued the retreating Axis troops to the Mius, reached by 18 February. Withdrawn to the reserve to rebuild, the division returned to combat with the 2nd Guards Army in the Mius Offensive in mid-July. Tsalikov and his division were surrounded by a German counterattack on 30 July and did not break out until 1 August. After receiving reinforcements, the 3rd Guards fought in the Donbas Strategic Offensive from 18 August, then went on to participate in the Melitopol Offensive and the Crimean Offensive. His superior, 1st Guards Rifle Corps commander Lieutenant General Ivan Missan, evaluated him as "personally daring and decisive" and "always on the frontline, inspiring subordinates with his courage."

After the end of the Crimean Offensive, the 3rd Guards and its army were withdrawn to the Reserve of the Supreme High Command, and two days later Tsalikov was appointed commander of the 13th Guards Rifle Corps of the army, which the division was assigned to. He led the corps as part of the army in the Šiauliai Offensive from 8 July. He was awarded the Order of Kutuzov, 2nd class, for his "skillful command of rifle units and formations in different types of battle" and "proving himself to be a brave and courageous officer". Tsalikov was killed at 08:30 on 21 July while circling the positions of the 3rd Guards Rifle Division when the Willys Jeep he was riding in struck a land mine near the village of Dudy, north of Kurkliai. His adjutant was also killed, while a submachine gunner accompanying him was wounded and the driver survived. Tsalikov was buried in Vitebsk.

== Awards ==
Tsalikov was a recipient of the following decorations:

- Order of the Red Banner (2)
- Order of Suvorov, 2nd class
- Order of Kutuzov, 2nd class
- Order of the Patriotic War, 1st class
- Medals
