= 387th Rifle Division =

- Active: 1941 - 1947
- Country: Soviet Union
- Branch: Red Army
- Type: Division
- Role: Infantry
- Engagements: Battle of Moscow; Battle of Stalingrad; Operation Winter Storm; Rostov Offensive Operation; Donbas Strategic Offensive; Crimean Offensive; Vienna Offensive
- Battle honours: Perekop

Commanders
- Notable commanders: Col. Maksim Andreevich Sushchenko; Col. Pyotr Ivanovich Kulizhsky; Col. Aleksandr Konstantinovich Makarev; Col. Margazian Gallnulovich Krimov; Col. Aleksandr Petrovich Roslov; Col. Antonii Avgustovich Kovalevsky; Col. Semyon Nikolaievich Barakhtanov

The 387th Rifle Division was raised in 1941 as an infantry division of the Red Army, and served for the duration of the Great Patriotic War in that role. It began forming on September 1, 1941, in the Central Asia Military District. It first served in the winter counteroffensive south of Moscow, then spent the spring and summer of 1942 on the relatively quiet fronts southwest of the capital in the area of Kaluga and Tula. In September it was withdrawn to the Reserve of the Supreme High Command where it joined the 1st Reserve Army. This became the 2nd Guards Army and the division fought south of Stalingrad against Army Group Don during the German attempt to relieve their encircled 6th Army in December. During January and into February, 1943, 2nd Guards advanced on both sides of the lower Don River towards Rostov in a race to prevent Army Group A from escaping being trapped in the Caucasus region. The division was now part of Southern Front and it would remain in that Front (later 4th Ukrainian) until May, 1944. During the summer advance through the Donbas and southern Ukraine the 387th served under several different army commands before returning to 2nd Guards for the Crimean Offensive in April, 1944, during which it won a battle honor. After the Crimea was cleared the division remained there as part of the Separate Coastal Army until it went back to the Reserve in March, 1945. It then was assigned to the 2nd Ukrainian Front as a separate rifle division, and spent the last weeks of the war in Hungary and Austria. It continued to serve briefly into the postwar period.

== Formation ==
The 387th began forming on September 1, 1941, in the Central Asia Military District at Akmolinsk in Kazakhstan, based on the first wartime shtat (table of organization and equipment) for rifle divisions. Its order of battle was as follows:

- 1271st Rifle Regiment
- 1273rd Rifle Regiment
- 1275th Rifle Regiment
- 949th Artillery Regiment
- 276th Antitank Battalion
- 448th Reconnaissance Company
- 666th Sapper Battalion
- 837th Signal Battalion (later 323rd Signal Company)
- 471st Medical/Sanitation Battalion
- 464th Chemical Protection (Anti-gas) Company
- 501st Motor Transport Company
- 253rd Field Bakery
- 809th Divisional Veterinary Hospital
- 1418th Field Postal Station
- 757th Field Office of the State Bank

Col. Maksim Andreevich Sushchenko was assigned to command of the division on the day it began forming, and he would remain in command until May 28, 1942. The division spent slightly over two months forming up in the Central Asia district, then moved north by rail to the Volga Military District in November, where it was assigned to the new 61st Army that was forming there. At that time the division's personnel were noted as being mostly Kazakh.

=== Battle of Moscow ===
At the start of the Moscow counteroffensive 61st Army was part of Bryansk Front, but was reassigned to Western Front in January, 1942. Until January 16 the Army was regrouping, operating against the German Bolkhov group of forces, including the 112th and 167th Infantry Divisions. This regrouping changed the direction of the Army's right-flank divisions, the 91st Cavalry, 387th and 350th Rifle Divisions, from the west and southwest to the southeast. By late on January 20 the 91st Cavalry had taken Ivanovo, the 350th took Yagoda while the 387th overcame enemy resistance and reached a front from Nogaya to Kireikovo, liberating both locales. However, by now the neighboring 10th Army had ceased to advance and was being forced back in places. Over the next ten days the 61st Army continued to focus its attacks on the Bolkhov grouping and on the morning of January 30 the division began a fierce fight for Vyazovaya and Malaya Chern. Although by now Bolkhov was surrounded on three sides the German garrison continued to hold, and the offensive turned into positional warfare.

== Move to the South ==
Until August the 387th remained in 61st Army, which moved between Western Front and Bryansk Front. On May 29 Col. Pyotr Ivanovich Kulizhsky took command from Colonel Sushchenko. In August in fighting near Zhizdra the division was encircled and forced to break out, losing most of its personnel and equipment in the process. On September 10 it was removed to the Reserve of the Supreme High Command for rebuilding. It was assigned to the 1st Reserve Army which was located well behind the front at Tambov, Rasskazovo, Michurinsk and Morshansk. On October 23 the STAVKA formed the 2nd Guards Army based on 1st Reserve, which was expected to be combat-ready by November 25. The 387th was assigned to the 13th Guards Rifle Corps, which also commanded the 3rd and 49th Guards Rifle Divisions. At the same time Col. Aleksandr Konstantinovich Makarev took command of the division from Colonel Kulizhsky, who would go on to command the 152nd Rifle Division, become a Hero of the Soviet Union leading a crossing of the Dniepr, and be promoted to major general in 1944.

=== Operation Winter Storm ===
The 2nd Guards Army was intended for the proposed Operation Saturn. However, as the new Army Group Don massed its forces for an attempt to relieve the 6th Army that had been encircled at Stalingrad in November the STAVKA prioritized the defense of the encirclement and directed the Army to the region north of Kotelnikovo. The German offensive began on December 12 and made large gains in the first day, but soon slowed against Soviet resistance. On December 18 the 2nd Guards began arriving after an arduous overland march. By nightfall the leading divisions of 13th Guards Corps closed into defensive positions along the north bank of the Myshkova River, along with more than 200 tanks of the 2nd Guards Mechanized Corps. Even late on December 20, as the LVII Panzer Corps struggled to cross the Myshkova, Army Group Don was unaware of the presence of 2nd Guards Army backing up the shopworn 51st Army. On December 21 an overextended 3rd Guards Division found itself partly encircled in the Kapkinsky region and required support from 49th Guards while the 387th was in second echelon at Farm No. 1 - Tebektenerovo. Over the next 48 hours the LVII Corps gradually went over to the defensive and early on December 23 the 6th Panzer Division, facing 13th Guards Corps, was ordered southwest to counter the Soviet forces that were breaking loose in Operation Little Saturn, effectively bringing Winter Storm to a close.

Stalingrad Front ordered its forces to go over to the offensive beginning at 0800 hours on December 24 after a brief artillery preparation. 2nd Guards Army attacked southward east of the Don River toward Kotelnikovo with 13th Guards Corps in the first echelon and 2nd Guards Mechanized in support. German forces were soon cleared from the south bank of the Myshkova, after which the mechanized troops took up the lead, advancing between 4 – 16 km. The 387th was advancing on its Corps' left flank, tying in with 51st Army. During the next day the advancing Army continued south, clearing Verkhne-Kumsky, a scene of heavy fighting days earlier. By 1700 hours the defending 17th and 23rd Panzer Divisions had just 19 operable tanks remaining between them. The advance continued through the next four days while the 387th remained some distance in the rear; at 2200 hours combined forces of 2nd Guards Army liberated Kotelnikovo.

== Drive on Rostov ==
At this point the STAVKA shifted its attention to the German Corps Mieth, which was located in the great bend of the Don, south of the Chir River, based on the town of Tormosin. It was made up of a hodgepodge of Axis units and was now partly encircled with 5th Tank Army to its north, 5th Shock Army to its east, and 2nd Guards Army to its southeast, advancing to its south. 2nd Guards was ordered to form a shock group to liquidate the Tormosin grouping in conjunction with 5th Shock. Maj. Gen. Ya. G. Kreizer was given command of the group, which consisted of the 2nd Guards Mechanized Corps, the 4th Cavalry Corps, and the 33rd Guards, 387th and 300th Rifle Divisions. On December 29 the 33rd Guards crossed the Don aided by light tanks of the 2nd Guards Mechanized and advanced on Chapurin and Aginov. Over that night the 2nd Guards Army was transferred to the new Southern Front; the 387th would remain in this Front (renamed 4th Ukrainian in October, 1943) until May, 1944.

Late on January 1, 1943, the 2nd Guards Mechanized liberated Tormosin, with the 300th and 387th Divisions following its advance. The next objective was the town of Nizhne-Gurov on the way to the Tsimla River. From here the grouping would be joined by the 33rd Guards Rifle to take Tsimlyanskaia and Konstantinovsky, while also seeking to isolate and destroy elements of Corps Mieth as they fell back. The 387th was subordinated to 1st Guards Rifle Corps on January 6, and by now was coming up to join the rest of Kreizer's group. Meanwhile, 11th Panzer Division was moving east to take up positions along the Kagalnik River. During that day the division, along with the 33rd and 24th Guards Rifle Divisions engaged in fierce fighting with the 11th Panzer and 336th Infantry Divisions for the populated points of Suvorov, Kargalsko-Belianski and Mariinski in front of the Kagalnik. By day's end on the 7th these points were taken, but an immediate attempt to force the river was unsuccessful. At this point Group Kreizer was disbanded.

According to the operational summary of 1st Guards Corps for January 9 the 387th "reached the Bogoiavlinskaia region, reinforced 24th Gds. RD, and cut the roads leading to the west and northwest." A further report from 2nd Guards Army indicated that on the same date the Corps faced a heavy German counterattack and "387th RD committed two regiments to combat and the third regiment is in reserve at Nikolaievskaia." 11th Panzer had struck 24th Guards with roughly 35 tanks and its panzer reconnaissance battalion, "bowling it over" and advancing about 10 km, capturing Kostyrochnyi and reaching Bogoiavlinskaia before being halted by the two regiments at 1900 hours. In response to this German attack the commander of Southern Front, Col. Gen. A. I. Yeryomenko, ordered the division's reserve regiment, backed by two tank regiments, to Sovkhoz No. 37 and Kondakov to maintain contact with 5th Shock Army. In the course of the fighting between January 9–12, which also involved the 7th Panzer Division, four divisions of 2nd Guards and 5th Shock were badly damaged and forced to withdraw, leaving the 387th and other units on the defense. This effectively brought the Soviet drive on Rostov north of the Don to a standstill.

During the following days the German XXXXVIII Panzer Corps to the north began retreating in the face of a renewed offensive by Southwestern Front. This in turn forced Corps Mieth to start its own withdrawal on January 16, just before 1st Guards Corps planned to renew its offensive. During the day the 387th took Kostyrochnyi and Ust-Kagalnitsky and sent out reinforced forward detachments farther west. The advance continued through to the 19th by which time the division was attacking east of Bronitsky with one regiment and fighting for Mikhailovsky and Aparinsky. This placed it roughly abreast of the 300th Rifle Division south of the Don. At the same time the division seized a bridgehead over the Northern Donets River near its confluence with the Don, but it was dominated from high ground held by elements of the German 384th Infantry Division. At this point the advance stalled and on January 22–23 the division sustained several German counterattacks, including one that 2nd Guards Army claimed was led by 40 tanks despite the fact that the panzer divisions had been moved north to assist XXXXVIII Corps. The 387th was reported to have lost 2 km of ground but to have also destroyed six enemy tanks.

By this time it was clear that the decision to operate 2nd Guards Army on both sides of the Don had been a mistake and since German forces had a strong line along the Donets, the best route to Rostov was south of the Don. On January 25–26 the 33rd Guards and 387th regrouped south of the river; due to Soviet supply difficulties both divisions had to leave part of their artillery behind because of the absence of fuel. At 0700 hours on January 27 the division was concentrating at Bagaevskaia, linking up with the 300th. On the 28th it was reported as having had to make a withdrawal due to flanking artillery fire and also repelled an attack by five armored personnel carriers of 17th Panzer Division. On the same day Colonel Makarev recorded the strength of his rifle regiments as 2,884 total personnel with only 1,550 "bayonets" (riflemen and sappers). He continued:

"The division began its offensive at 1200 hours on 28 January with the mission of reaching the Aleksandrovka and Starocherkassk line by 1200 hours on 28 January. The enemy resisted with motorized infantry, tanks, and APCs supported by aircraft in our sector... By 1000 hours on 29 January, the division... reached the Karaich Estuary and Donskoi circular line. As a result... the enemy lost one tank and armored vehicle and withdrew toward Novocherkassk. The division's units suffered the following losses from tank fire and enemy bombs: [173 men killed and wounded and 103 horses]."

On January 26 the 1st Panzer Army began its march north to Rostov and by the 29th it was becoming clear that Southern Front would not be able to prevent it. Nevertheless, the 387th advanced along the right bank of the Don with the mission of capturing Starocherkasskaia Station. By the end of the month the division was reassigned to 13th Guards Rifle Corps.

Before midday on February 3 the 33rd Guards finally cleared the village of Manychskaia and advanced to assist the 387th in its struggle for Arpachin. Leaving this fight to the Guardsmen, the division was ordered to move back north of the Don where it made some progress against the 15th Luftwaffe Field Division. At 1800 hours the 1271st Regiment was fighting 1 km east of Krasnyi Dvor, the 1273rd reached Marker +1.2 and the 1275th reached the eastern bank of Lake Khriashchevatoe. Between February 6–8 the last German forces south of the Don, 111th Infantry and 16th Infantry (Motorized) Divisions, withdrew, blowing the bridges behind them, although one bridge at Rostov was only half destroyed. Although Rostov would not be liberated until February 14, it was understood by both sides that the next German defense line would be along the Mius River, as it had been after the first liberation of the city in 1941. Given the heavy casualties to date on both sides, what followed would be a race to the Mius by "cripples."

=== Race to the Mius ===
On February 15 the 2nd Guards Army's advance was led by the roughly 20 operable tanks of 3rd Guards Mechanized Corps and two truck-mounted rifle battalions which liberated Generalskoe near noon and reached Petrovskoe, a total advance of about 32 km. The foot-bound 387th and 33rd Guards lagged 15 – 20 km behind. The next day the division continued its pursuit, facing little enemy resistance. On February 17 Southern Front was closing on Matveev Kurgan and the Mius River which it hoped to cross from the march; instead, "driven by necessity, optimism, vengeance, or sheer stubbornness, the Southern Front's bloody attacks along the river would persist through and past the end of the month." On that day the division continued its pursuit and fought for Staraia Rotovka before taking it at 1800 hours with help from 3rd Guards Mechanized. Its further objective would be Demidovka, 5 km northwest of Matveev Kurgan on the west side of the Mius.

The 387th's advance continued on February 18. The 1275th Regiment reached Demidovka but was counterattacked and cut off there by elements of the 23rd Panzer Division; the 1273rd captured Shaposhnikova, also west of the river, but was then halted by heavy enemy fire, while the 1271st was in second echelon 1.5 km to the rear. The next day communications were restored to the 1275th but the 1273rd was forced out of Shaposhnikova, which was retaken by the 1271st on February 20 while the two other regiments were fighting together 500m east of Doroganov. Over the next two days Southern Front's advance finally ran out of steam. The division, still fighting west of Shaposhnikova, had only 50 active "bayonets"; 28 in the 1271st, 10 in the 1273rd, and 12 in the 1275th. As well, the 4th Guards Mechanized Corps, which had penetrated farthest beyond the Mius, had been cut off by German counterattacks.

Even at this low ebb of strength, on February 23 the 387th, aided by the 24th Guards, continued pushing forward against a panzergrenadier battalion of the 23rd Panzer which was in no better shape. The next day the 1271st Regiment faced off a counterattack by six German tanks from Komunna which withdrew after one was destroyed. Finally, on February 25 the 2nd Guards Army was ordered to go over to the defense, although it was planned to launch a new offensive three days later. On February 27 the division was reported as having a total of 1,539 men, including 565 "bayonets". When the attack resumed the next day it captured most of Hill 114.9 with the 98th Division, but following this heavy German fire brought the advance to a standstill. On March 2 only limited gains were made at a cost to the 387th of 59 killed, 116 wounded and 4 missing in action. By this time the German Army Group South was completing its defeat of Southwestern Front in the northern Donbas, and nothing was available to help Southern Front breach the "Mius Wall", so on March 3 the 2nd Guards Army was ordered to dig in to defend its bridgehead.

== Into Ukraine and Crimea ==
In April the 387th was reassigned to the 28th Army, but in May it was moved to the 37th Rifle Corps in 44th Army. On June 29 Colonel Makarev handed his command to Col. Margazian Gallnulovich Krimov, who would remain in this post for exactly two months. During the summer offensive that began across the Muis in July and advanced through the south of Ukraine the division was assigned at various times to the 28th, 44th and 5th Shock Armies. On September 3 Col. Aleksandr Petrovich Roslov took command of the division. From September 11 to October 19 it was in the Reserve of the Supreme High Command, in 94th Rifle Corps of 58th Army, for rebuilding.

When it returned to the front the division was assigned to the 55th Rifle Corps of 51st Army in the renamed 4th Ukrainian Front. On December 12 Colonel Roslov turned his command over to Col. Antonii Avgustovich Kovalevsky. Just prior to the start of the Crimean Offensive in April, 1944, the 387th returned to 2nd Guards Army, now into the 54th Rifle Corps. At this time it had 5,854 officers and men assigned, armed with (apart from rifles and carbines) 1,375 submachine guns, 265 light machine guns, 89 heavy machine guns, 136 antitank rifles, 70 mortars and 86 artillery pieces of all calibres. Each rifle company averaged about 75 officers and men. For the actual assaults that started in early April the division was reinforced with the 5th Separate Army Rifle Company, a shtraf ("penal") unit with 120 men and 12 LMGs.

2nd Guards began its assault on the German positions on the Perekop isthmus on April 8 using relatively novel tactics. Army Gen. G. F. Zakharov led with just his 13th Guards Corps, with artillery-delivered smoke rounds, flame-throwing tanks and heavy self-propelled guns in support. Despite losses the attack tore a large hole in the German line. By 1600 hours the next day the German line finally broke. While the German Gruppe Konrad was struggling to hold its positions, Zakharov increased the pressure by ordering the 387th to make an amphibious landing behind their lines. Before dawn on April 10, 512 troops of Cpt. Filipp Davidovich Dibrov's 2nd Battalion of the 1271st Regiment were landed on the coast. Even without heavy weapons the battalion held off counterattacks by a company of infantry and several assault guns. This landing was the final straw to convince the Germans to abandon their remaining positions on the Perekop and start a retreat to their second line at Ishun, which was already untenable and soon fell, giving the Soviet forces complete access to the Crimea. Captain Dibrov was awarded the Gold Star of a Hero of the Soviet Union (Medal No. 6900) and in part for this action the division was given "Perekop" as a battle honor.

== Late War and Postwar ==
After the final Axis resistance at Sevastopol ceased on May 13 the 387th was reassigned back to 55th Rifle Corps, which was now in the Separate Coastal Army; this Army was moved to the Reserve of the Supreme High Command on September 11. On August 18 the division had received its final wartime commander, Col. Semyon Nikolaievich Barakhtanov. It remained in the Reserve until March, 1945, when it returned to the active army as a separate reserve rifle division directly under command of the 2nd Ukrainian Front advancing in Hungary and Austria in the final weeks of the war.
