= 4th Ukrainian Front =

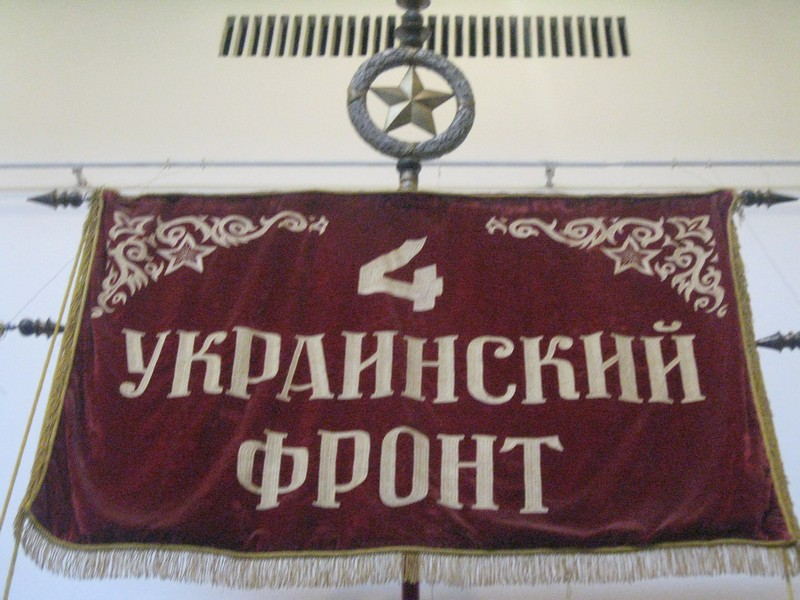
- The Front's banner in a Moscow museum
- Active: 1943–45
- Country: Soviet Union
- Branch: Red Army
- Type: Army group
- Role: Co-ordination and conduct of Red Army Operations in Ukraine, South-Eastern and Central Europe
- Size: 2-4 Armies
- Engagements: World War II: Battle of the Dnieper; Battle of Kiev (1943); Western Carpathian Offensive; Moravian-Ostrava Offensive; Prague Offensive

The 4th Ukrainian Front (Russian: Четвёртый Украинский фронт) was the name of two distinct Red Army strategic army groups that fought on the Eastern Front in World War II.

The front was first formed on 20 October 1943, by renaming the Southern Front and was involved in the Lower Dnieper Strategic Offensive Operation, two battles of Kiev and the Crimean Strategic Offensive Operation. After the liberation of Crimea, the front was disbanded in May 1944.

For the second time the 4th Ukrainian Front was created on 4 August 1944, by separating the left wing of the 1st Ukrainian Front. The front took part in the Carpathian Offensive simultaneously with the Battle of the Dukla Pass. Afterwards, the front was involved in the battles in East-, North- and Central Slovakia, as well as in the Moravian-Ostrava Offensive Operation on the Polish-Moravian borders and finally in the Prague Offensive which was the final battle of World War II in Europe.

The actions of the 4th Ukrainian Front were important for the liberation of Czechoslovakia. The 1st Czechoslovak Army Corps also served within the front from November 1944 until May 1945.

On 25 August 1945, the front was disbanded and its elements incorporated into the Carpathian Military District.

== 4th Ukrainian Front, April 1944 - May 1944 ==
=== Order of Battle, on 1 April 1944 ===
- Units subordinated to the Front:
  - 35th Tank-destroyer Artillery Brigade, 530th Tank-Destroyer Artillery Regiment, 4th Guards Mortar Brigade (13th, 30th, 31st Guards Mortar Regiment), 2nd, 4th, 19th, 21st, 23rd, 67th Guards Mortar Regiments, 270th Guards AA Artillery Regiment (from 18th Anti-Aircraft Artillery Division), 1069th AA Artillery Regiment (from 2nd Division), 1485th Anti-Aircraft Artillery Regiment
  - 19th Tank Corps (79th, 101st, 202nd Tank Brigades, 26th Motorized Rifle Brigade, 867th, 875th SP Artillery Regiments, 91st Motorcycle Battalion, 1511th Tank-Destroyer Artillery Regiment, 179th Mortar Regiment, 1717th AA Artillery Regiment)
      - 6th Guards Tank Brigade, 52nd Motorcycle Regiment, 5th Separate Armored Car Battalion, 46th and 54th Separate
        Armored Train Battalions
  - 7th Engineer-Sapper Brigade, 2nd Pontoon-Bridge Brigade, 3rd Guards, 65th, 240th Separate Engineer Battalions, 17th Guards Mine Battalion, 102nd Pontoon-Bridge Battalion (from 5th Pontoon-Bridge Brigade)
- 2nd Guards Army
  - 13th Guards Rifle Corps
    - 3rd Guards Rifle Division
    - 24th Guards Rifle Division
    - 87th Guards Rifle Division
  - 54th Rifle Corps
    - 126th Rifle Division
    - 315th Rifle Division
    - 387th Rifle Division
  - 55th Rifle Corps
    - 87th Rifle Division
    - 347th Rifle Division
    - 116th Fortified Region
    - 2nd Guards Breakthrough Artillery Division (4th Guards Light Artillery Brigade, 114 Gun Artillery Brigade, 5th Guards Howitzer Artillery Brigade, 20th Guards High Power Howitzer Artillery Brigade, 33rd Mortar Brigade)
  - Independent (Army) units: 1095th, 1101st Gun Artillery Regiments, 331st Howitzer Artillery Regiment, 315th and 317th Artillery Battalions of High Impact (heavy artillery), 113th Guards, 14th 1250th Tank-Destroyer Artillery Regiments, 133rd Guards, 483rd Mortar Regiments (MRL), 76th AA Artillery Division (223rd, 416th, 447th AA Artillery Regiments), 591st, 1530th AA Artillery Regiments
  - 1452nd SP Artillery Regiment, 512 Independent Tank Battalion
  - 43rd Special Purpose Engineer Brigade, Independent 258th and 255th Engineer Battalions
- 51st Army:
  - 1st Guards Rifle Corps (33rd Guards, 91st, 346th RD),
  - 10th Rifle Corps (216th, 357th, 279th Rifle Divisions),
  - 63rd Rifle Corps (263rd, 267th, 417th Rifle Divisions)
    - 77th Rifle Division
    - 78th Fortified Region
    - 26th Artillery Division (75th Light Artillery Brigade, 56th Gun Artillery Brigade, 77th Howitzer Brigade)
  - Independent (Army) units: 6th Guards Gun Artillery Brigade (from 2nd Guards Breakthrough Artillery Division), 105th High Impact Howitzer Artillery Brigade (from 7th Breakthrough Artillery Division), 647th, 1105th Gun Artillery Regiments, 85th Guards, 1231st Howitzer Artillery Regiment, 207th Guards Howitzer Artillery Regiment (from 5th Guards Howitzer Artillery Brigade), 5th Guards, 15th, 21st Tank-destroyer Artillery Brigades, 764th 1246th Tank-destroyer Artillery Regiment, 19th Mortar Brigade, 125th Mortar Regiment.
  - Anti-Aircraft Artillery forces
    - 2nd Anti-Aircraft Artillery Division (1086th, 1113th, 1117th AA Artillery Regiment)
    - 15th Anti-Aircraft Artillery Division (281st, 342nd, 723rd, 1264th AA Artillery Regiments)
    - 18th Anti-Aircraft Artillery Division (160th and 166th Guards, 297th AA Artillery Regiments)
      77th Guards Artillery Regiment
    - 32nd Guards Tank Brigade, 22nd Guards Separate Tank Regiment, 30th and 33rd Separate Armored Train Battalions
    - 12th Assault Engineer Brigade, 63rd Engineer-Sapper Brigade, 5th Guards, 1504 Separate Engineer Battalions, 275th Separate Sapper Battalion

=== Operations ===
The front's first operations were the Lower Dnieper Strategic Offensive Operation and the Kiev Strategic Offensive and Kiev Strategic Defensive operations. In early 1944, after an amphibious landing against the German-held Crimea, begun the Crimean Strategic Offensive Operation in which 4UF, including 2nd Guards Army, 51st Army and the Separate Coastal Army destroyed the 17th Army which was holding out there. 5th Shock Army and 28th Army were also part of the Front at the time, but do not appear from U.S. military maps to have actually taken part in the battle.

== 4th Ukrainian Front, August 1944 - August 1945 ==
=== Order of Battle, 1944 - 1945 ===
- 1st Guards Army
- 18th Army
- 8th Air Army
- 1st Czechoslovak Army Corps, since November 1944
- 38th Army, since November 1944
- 60th Army, since March 1945

== Commanders of the Front ==
- General Fyodor Tolbukhin (October 1943 - May 1944)
- General Ivan Yefimovich Petrov (August 1944 - March 1945)
- General Andrey Ivanovich Yeryomenko (March 1945 - May 1945)
