= 76th Anti-Aircraft Artillery Division =

- Active: February 1944–c. 1950s
- Country: Soviet Union
- Branch: Red Army (later Soviet Army)
- Type: Anti-Aircraft Artillery
- Engagements: World War II
- Battle honours: Perekop

The 76th Anti-Aircraft Artillery Division (Russian: 76-я зенитная артиллерийская дивизия) was an anti-aircraft artillery division of the Soviet Union's Red Army (later the Soviet Army) during World War II and the early postwar period.

Formed in February 1944 with the 4th Ukrainian Front, the division fought in the Crimean Offensive and received the honorific Perekop for its actions there in April. It spent the next several months as a garrison for Crimea with the Separate Coastal Army but rejoined the 4th Ukrainian Front in August during the Lvov–Sandomierz Offensive. Advancing westward, the 76th fought in the Battle of the Dukla Pass, the Moravian-Ostrava Offensive, and the Prague Offensive in late 1944 and 1945. From December 1944 it was part of the 38th Army. The division was disbanded by the 1950s.

== World War II ==
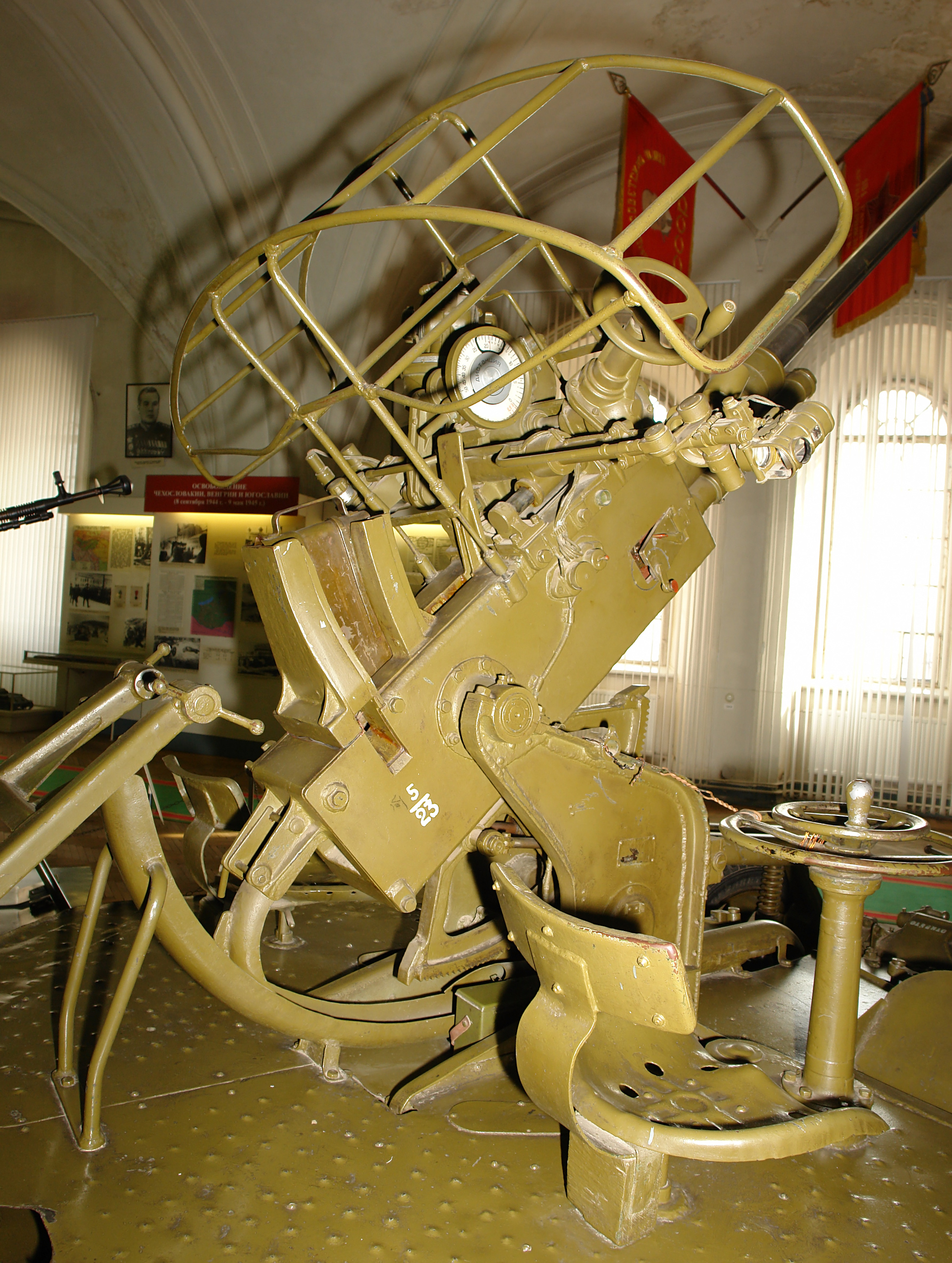
A 37 mm AA gun of the type used by the division during World War II

The 76th Anti-Aircraft Artillery Division of the Reserve of the Supreme High Command was formed with the 2nd Guards Army of the 4th Ukrainian Front in February 1944. It included the 223rd, 416th, and 447th Anti-Aircraft Artillery Regiments, which had previously been independent. Colonel Mikhail Timofeyev was assigned commander on 18 February, but on 31 March he transferred to become chief of staff of another anti-aircraft artillery division. Colonel Vasily Kharitonovich took command of the division in April, leading it in the Crimean Offensive. For its actions the division was awarded the honorific Perekop on 24 April. In May, the 591st Anti-Aircraft Artillery Regiment, another previously independent unit, became the division's fourth regiment. At the same time it transferred to the Separate Coastal Army, which remained in Crimea. In July it moved north, joining the Kiev Military District.

Colonel Fyodor Bolbat took command of the division in August. The 76th fought in the capture of Drogobych during the Lvov–Sandomierz Offensive in August. During the month the division was directly subordinated to the reformed 4th Ukrainian Front, though it supported the 1st Guards Army as well. It subsequently participated in the Battle of the Dukla Pass, advancing west through the Carpathian Mountains. It was briefly transferred to the 18th Army in November, joining the 38th Army in December. The 76th remained with the latter until the end of the war. In the final months of the war in 1945 the division fought in the Moravian-Ostrava Offensive and the Prague Offensive, ending the war in Prague. Under Bolbat's command, the division claimed 51 enemy aircraft downed, as well as 24 pillboxes, 76 vehicles, and 37 guns destroyed in ground combat. It was credited with suppressing the fire of thirteen enemy mortar and artillery batteries, damaging two tanks, and capturing 120 enemy soldiers, as well as scattering and partially destroying up to three enemy regiments.

== Postwar ==
Bolbat continued to command the division until June 1946, when he was sent to study at higher courses. The division was among those anti-aircraft artillery divisions disbanded without being converted into another unit by the end of the 1950s.
