= 75th Guards Rifle Division =

Red Army military unit

75th Guards Tank Division (11 April 1965–1 July 1989) 75th Guards Heavy Tank Division (11 January–11 April 1965) 14th Guards Heavy Tank Division (18 November 1954–11 January 1965) 14th Guards Tank Division (27 July–18 November 1954) 64th Guards Mechanized Division (October 1953–27 July 1954) 17th Separate Guards Rifle Brigade (1946–October 1953) 75th Guards Rifle Division (1 March 1943 – 1946)
- Country: Soviet Union
- Branch: Red Army (Soviet Army from 1946)
- Type: Infantry (Mechanized from 1953, Tank from 1954)
- Size: more than 10,000 (Second World War)
- Engagements: World War II: Battle of Kursk; Operation Kutuzov; Battle of the Dnieper (Chernigov-Pripyat offensive); Battle of Kiev); Kalinkovichi-Mozyr offensive; Operation Bagration; Riga offensive; Warsaw-Poznan operation (Vistula–Oder offensive); East Pomeranian offensive; Battle of Berlin
- Decorations: Order of the Red Banner (2); Order of Suvorov 2nd class
- Battle honours: Bakhmach

Commanders
- Notable commanders: Major General Vasily Gorishny

The 75th Guards Rifle Division (Russian: 75-я гвардейская стрелковая дивизия, romanized: 75-ya gvardeyskaya strelkovaya diviziya) was a Red Army infantry division during World War II and afterwards, which later became the 75th Guards Tank Division and was finally disbanded in the 1990s.

The 75th Guards Rifle Division was redesignated at the beginning of March 1943 from the second formation of the 95th Rifle Division in recognition of the latter's courage and heroism during the Battle of Stalingrad. It fought in the Battle of Kursk, defending positions around Ponyri on the northern face of the Kursk Bulge, and was awarded the Order of the Red Banner for its actions. The division fought in Operation Kutuzov and the Battle of the Dnieper in the summer and early fall. It was awarded the honorific "Bakhmach" for helping to capture that city. The division then fought in the Battle of Kiev and advanced into eastern Belarus towards the end of the year. In January 1944 it fought in the Kalinkovichi-Mozyr offensive and received the Order of Suvorov, 2nd class for its actions. From late June the 75th Guards fought in Operation Bagration, advancing westwards into Belarus. For its actions the division was awarded its second Order of the Red Banner. In September the division was transferred to the Baltic and fought in the Riga offensive. It was relocated to eastern Poland in December and fought in the Vistula–Oder offensive, East Pomeranian offensive, and Battle of Berlin in the final months of the war.

Postwar, the division was withdrawn to Tula and downsized into the 17th Separate Guards Rifle Brigade. The brigade was relocated to Chuguyev, and became the 64th Guards Mechanized Division in 1953. In 1954 it became the 14th Guards Heavy Tank Division, and in 1965 it was redesignated the 75th Guards Tank Division. The division was downsized into a storage base in 1989, and finally disbanded in 1990.

== World War II ==
The division was formed on 1 March 1943 by the redesignation of the 95th Rifle Division (Second formation), which was made a Guards unit for its courage and heroism in the defense of Stalingrad. Its structure included the 90th, 161st, and 241st Rifle Regiments, and the 57th Artillery Regiment, which became the 212th, 231st, and 241st Guards Rifle Regiments, and the 159th Guards Artillery Regiment, respectively, on 4 April, and other smaller units. The division was commanded by Major General Vasily Gorishny, who led the division for the rest of the war. Initially part of the Central Front reserve, it joined the 13th Army in May. In reserve, the 75th Guards were brought up to full strength and replenished from their losses at Stalingrad.

=== Battle of Kursk ===
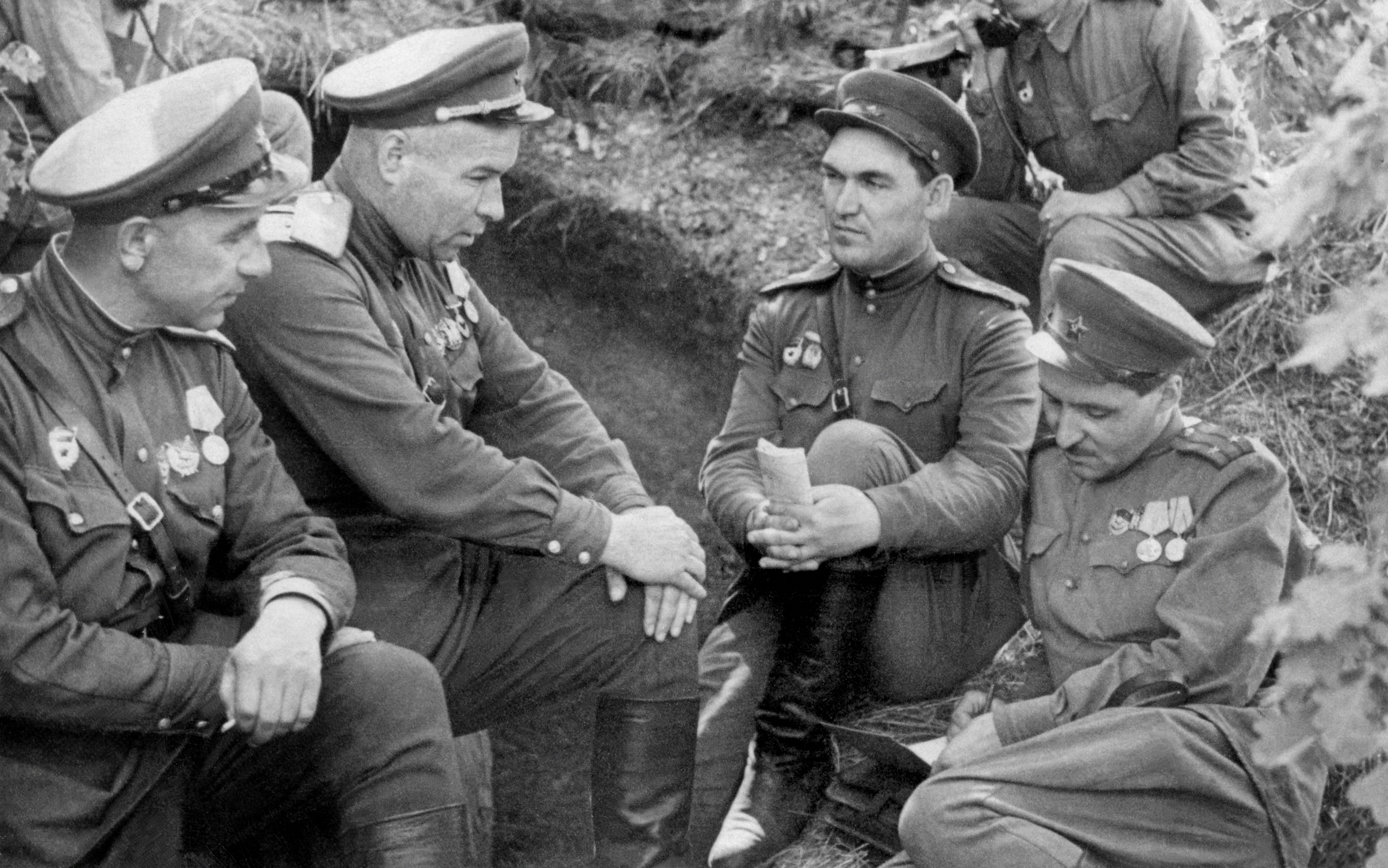
Vlasenko, Gorishny, Colonel A.V. Mukhin, and Lieutenant Colonel and writer Konstantin Simonov at the command post of the 75th Guards Rifle Division near Ponyri during the Battle of Kursk

During July 1943, as part of the army's 17th Guards Rifle Corps alongside the 70th Guards Rifle Division, the division fought in the Battle of Kursk. Facing one of the main German thrusts in the area of the Ponyri 2 sovkhoz, the 75th Guards helped repulse the attack, positioned in the second defensive belt. On 6 July, the second day of the battle, the 70th and 75th Guards, supported by the 9th and 16th Tank Corps, attacked the 2nd Panzer Division, positioned between Bobrik and Saborovka, 10 kilometres (6.2 mi) from its start line. In fierce fighting, the 2nd Panzer managed to slightly expand its bridgehead over the Svapa River. At Ponyri, the 75th Guards' 84th Separate Guards Anti-Tank Battalion was attacked by Tiger tanks, but managed to claim five Panzer IVs with its 45 mm anti-tank guns. At 19:30, German tanks and infantry attacked into the division's flank and rear west of Snova after pushing the 6th Guards Rifle Division back. The 75th Guards speedily regrouped and repulsed the German attack, destroying up to 30 tanks according to Soviet reports. On 7 July the German attacks at Ponyri 2 continued, with an attack by thirty tanks and infantry from the 9th Panzer Division achieving a limited advance against the 75th Guards by 17:00. During the day the infantry from the division supported tanks and anti-tank guns in inflicting heavy losses on the attacking German tanks. On the afternoon of 10 July, after the German troops retreated to their original positions, the 75th Guards participated in a general counterattack in the sector. Regrouping and exploiting the breakthrough, the division went on the offensive during Operation Kutuzov on 15 July. For its exemplary fighting performance, the division was awarded the Order of the Red Banner on 21 July 1943. By 25 July, the 75th Guards reached the line of Glazunovka and Nizhny Tagino, overcoming stiff German resistance. 5 soldiers of the division were made Heroes of the Soviet Union (all posthumously), and 173 officers and men recognized with awards and medals.

=== Chernigov-Pripyat offensive (1943) ===
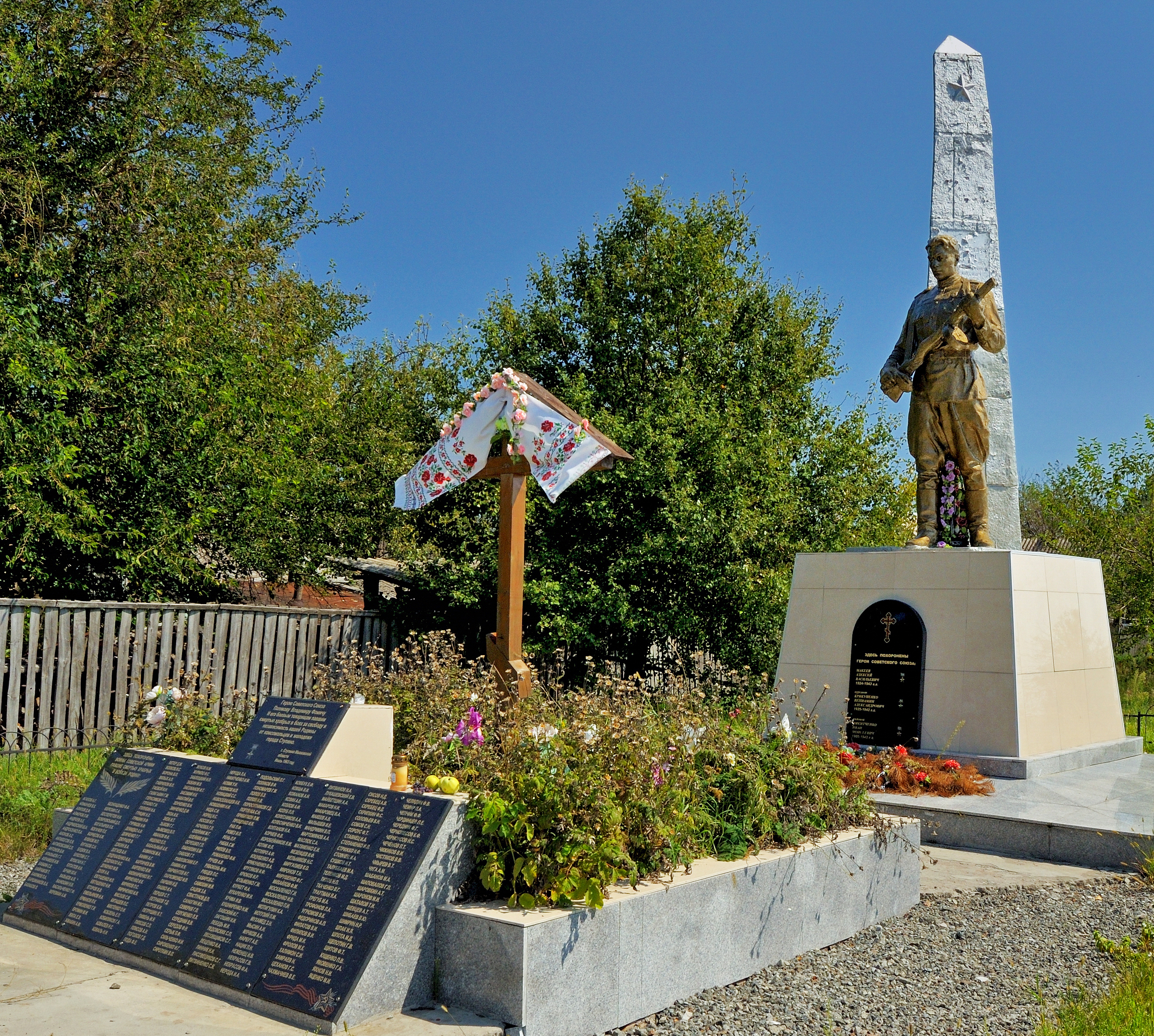
One of the four mass graves of soldiers who died in the liberation of the village of Yasnogorodka in 1943

The division's soldiers then helped clear left-bank Ukraine during the Chernigov-Pripyat offensive of the Central Front, part of the 70th Army and then the 60th Army's 30th Rifle Corps. For helping to clear Bakhmach, the division was given the honorific "Bakhmach" on 9 September. On 25 September parts of the division crossed the Dnieper River in the area of Tarasovichi and Yasnogorodka and seized a bridgehead. During the subsequent weeks, the 75th Guards fought in fierce fighting to expand the bridgehead. For courage shown in battle, 63 officers and men of the division were made Heroes of the Soviet Union, and 829 recognized with awards and medals.

=== Kiev offensive operations ===
In October and November 1943, the division, part of the 60th Army of the 1st Ukrainian Front, fought in the Kiev offensive operation. From January to July 1944 the division fought as part of the 65th Army of the Belarusian (from 17 February 1st Belarusian) Front. On 6 January, the division numbered 7,516 personnel, including 821 officers and 2,214 non-commissioned officers. Between 8 and 14 January, the 75th Guards fought in the Kalinkovichi-Mozyr offensive, which aimed to capture Kalinkovichi and Mozyr in eastern Belarus. The division was part of the 105th Rifle Corps along with the 132nd and 253rd Rifle Divisions at the time. In the first echelon, the 75th Guards and the 132nd were tasked with taking Davydovichi, Kholodniki, and Domanovichi. After the corps' breakthrough, the 1st Guards Tank Corps was to exploit it and encircle Kalinkovichi from the northwest. The assault began at 09:40 hours on 8 January, just before the end of an artillery bombardment. The division and the rest of its corps ran into strong German opposition, and only a limited advance was achieved. The 75th Guards were unable to advance and retreated back to their jumping-off positions at the end of the first day. After several days of indecisive fighting, the 1st Guards Tank Corps was committed to achieve the breakthrough on 11 January. The division covered the corps' realignment on a new direction of advance.

The infantry-supported tank attack broke through the German line, and the division cooperated with the 1st Guards Tank Corps' 17th Guards Tank Brigade in the attack on 5th Panzer Division positions along and east of the Shatsilki–Kalinkovichi road, but ran into fierce resistance. Assisted by airstrikes and an artillery bombardment, the tank brigade was able to capture the village of Anisovichi. The 69th and 75th Guards Rifle Divisions cleared 65th Army lines of communications and supply of German troops, enabling the 1st Guards Tank Corps to continue advancing south. In the afternoon of 12 January, the two rifle divisions provided support to the 15th and 17th Guards Tank Brigades in their successful assaults on the fortified villages of Turovichi and Zapolye, only 15 kilometres (9.3 mi) from Kalinkovichi.

The final assault on Kalinkovichi began on 13 January, by which time the German troops had begun withdrawing to new defensive positions along the Ipa River, northwest of the town. Facing strong resistance from rear guards, the 1st Guards Tank Corps briefly halted its advance 5 kilometres (3.1 mi) from Kalinkovichi at midday in order to call in airstrikes and allow the 105th Rifle Corps to catch up. The last village strongpoint on the road to Kalinkovichi, Antonovka, was captured by an assault of the 105th Rifle Corps and the 1st Guards Tank Corps. The division supported the tanks until the latter reached the outskirts of the town, then shifted west towards the Ipa.

For exemplary fighting performance in the offensive, the 75th Guards Rifle Division was awarded the Order of Suvorov, 2nd class, on 15 January. During the subsequent Ozarichi-Ptich offensive from 16 to 30 January, the division was held in general reserve. Along with the rest of the 105th Rifle Corps, the 75th Guards were positioned in the second echelon of a reinforced shock group that also included the 69th, 82nd, and 162nd Rifle Divisions in the first echelon after the advance on the northern sector of the penetration bogged down. The first echelon was able to break through and on 31 January the second echelon was committed to expand the penetration west and east to capture ground north of Savichi and the town of Syshchichi to the east. In mid-February the division supported a local offensive of the 48th Army as part of the 95th Rifle Corps, which achieved a gain of 2 kilometres (1.2 mi).

=== Operation Bagration ===
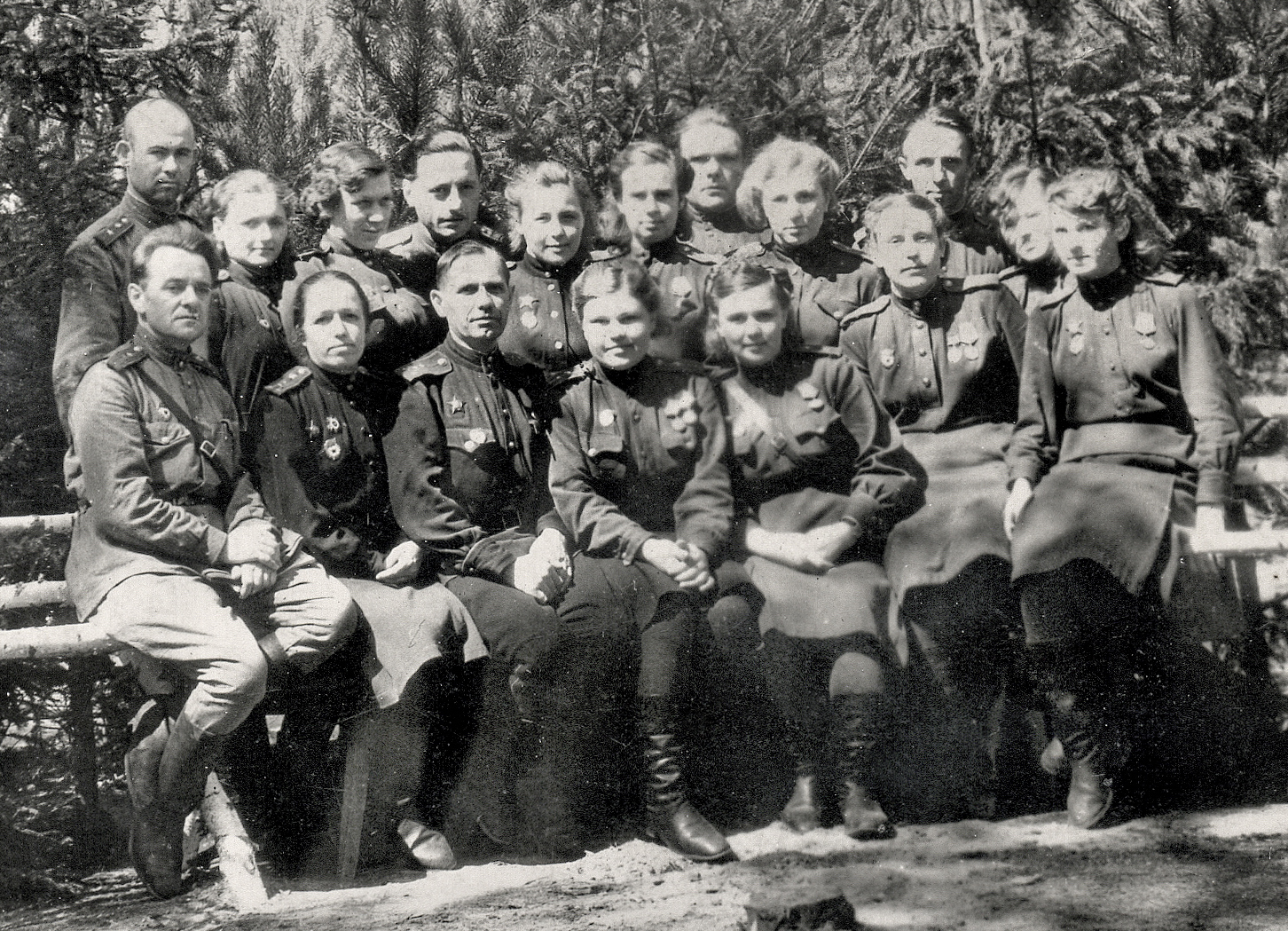
Personnel of the division's 585th Medical Battalion, 1944

During Operation Bagration, the Red Army's westward offensive through Belarus, which began on 23 June, the division was part of the 105th Rifle Corps in the first echelon of the 65th Army. On 24 June, it led the attack on the German trenches held by the 36th Infantry Division. Following the breakthrough of the German defenses, the 75th Guards supported the exploitation by the 1st Guards Tank Corps. In stubborn fighting, the division helped take Parichi. The division then participated in the destruction of the German pocket in the Bobruisk area during the Bobruisk offensive and fought in the Minsk offensive. It captured the city of Baranovichi in early July, and was given the Order of the Red Banner for a second time on 5 July 1944.

=== Baltic Operations ===
From August 1944 to the end of the war, the division was part of the 61st Army. In September, the 75th Guards were transferred with the army from Białystok to the Pskov area. As part of the 3rd and 1st Baltic Fronts, the division participated in clearing the Baltic region, fighting in Latvia, Lithuania, and Estonia. The division fought in the Riga offensive from September, and for helping to capture the city the 212th Guards Rifle Regiment and 159th Guards Artillery Regiment received the honorific Riga, the 241st Guards Rifle Regiment was awarded the Order of the Red Banner, and the 231st Guards Rifle Regiment was awarded the Order of Suvorov, 3rd class.

In December, along with the army, it was transferred back to the 1st Belorussian Front. During the Vistula–Oder offensive, the division advanced west across Poland. For courage shown in battle on the Vistula, 3 officers and men of the division were made Heroes of the Soviet Union, and hundreds recognized with awards and medals.

=== East Pomeranian offensive ===
The division fought in the East Pomeranian offensive. For courage shown in battle on the Oder, 8 officers and men of the division were made Heroes of the Soviet Union, and 1317 recognized with awards and medals. The last operation of the division in World War II was the Battle of Berlin. The division ended its fighting on 3 May 1945, when it linked up with troops from the Ninth United States Army's 102nd Infantry Division on the Elbe near Wittenberg. During the war, 13,824 of the division's officers and men were awarded awards and medals, including 74 who were made Heroes of the Soviet Union. The 75th Guards Division ranked third among the rifle divisions of the Red Army by the number of Heroes of the Soviet Union – the 167th Rifle Division had 108 Heroes and the 25th Guards Rifle Division had 77 Heroes.

=== Composition ===
The 75th Guards Rifle Division included the following units in April 1943:

- 212th Guards Rifle Regiment (former 90th RR of 95th RD)
- 231st Guards Rifle Regiment (former 161st RR of 95th RD)
- 241st Guards Rifle Regiment (former 241st RR of 95th RD)
- 159th Guards Artillery Regiment (former 57th AR of 95th RD)
- 84th Separate Guards Antitank Battalion (former 97th SATB of 95th RD)
- 155th Machine-gun Battalion (to 15 April 1943)
- 73rd Separate Guards Reconnaissance Company (former 13th RC of 95th RD)
- 87th Separate Guards Sapper Battalion (former 48th SB of 95th RD)
- 106th Separate Guards Communications Company (former 119th SCC of 95th RD)
- 585th (80) Medical Battalion (former 103rd MB of 95th RD)
- 77th Separate Guards Chemical Defence Company (former 30th SCDS of 95th RD)
- 726th (79) Trucking Company (former 283rd TC of 95th RD)
- 660th (74) Field Bakery (former 174th FB of 95th RD)
- 678th (78) Divisional Veterinary Hospital (former 7th DVH of 95th RD)
- 1593rd (25703) Field Post Office (former 1766th (2054) FPO of 95th RD)
- 652nd (44705) Field Ticket Office of the State Bank (former 1723rd (652) FTO of 95th RD)

=== Awards and honorifics of the division units ===
- 212th Guards Rifle Regiment – Honorific Riga, Order of the Red Banner, Order of Suvorov, 3rd class
- 231st Guards Rifle Regiment – Order of the Red Banner, Order of Suvorov, 3rd class
- 241st Guards Rifle Regiment – Order of the Red Banner
- 159th Guards Artillery Regiment – Honorific Riga, Order of the Red Banner
- 84th Separate Guards Antitank Battalion – Order of Lenin
- 87th Separate Guards Sapper Battalion – Order of the Red Star

=== Commanders ===
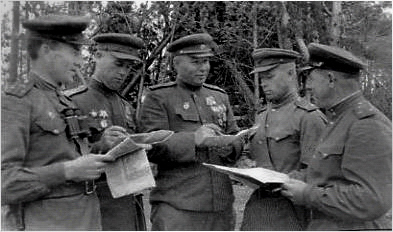
Gorishny (center) with regimental commanders, 1944

==== Division Commander ====
- Major General Vasily Gorishny (1 March 1943 – May 1946)

==== Deputy Division Commander for political affairs ====
- Colonel Ilya Vlasenko (1 March 1943 – June 1944)

==== Heads of the political department ====
- Colonel Arkady Ryabov (1 March – May 1943)
- Lieutenant Colonel Boris Pakin (January 1945 – May 1946)

==== Chiefs of staff ====
- Colonel Georgy Klymenko (February 1943 – end of 1943)
- Colonel Boris Galperin (December 1944 – early 1946)

==== Division artillery commander ====
- Colonel Aristo Dalakishvili (1 March 1943 – May 1946)

==== Regimental commanders ====
===== 212th Guards Rifle Regiment =====
- Colonel Mikhail Semyonovich Borisov (1 March 1943–Killed in action 9 February 1944)
- Colonel Iosif Chusovitin (28 February – 28 November 1944)
- Lieutenant Colonel Mikhail Trygubenko (acting; December 1944)
- Lieutenant Colonel (promoted to Colonel) Afanasy Vorobiev (9 January 1945 – May 1946)

===== 231st Guards Rifle Regiment =====
- Lieutenant Colonel Fyodor Makovetsky (1 March 1943 – critically wounded January 1944)
- Lieutenant Colonel Vasily Maksimov (13 January 1944 – 9 January 1945)
- Lieutenant Colonel Adelzyan Zalialov (9 January – 4 June 1945)
- Lieutenant Colonel Georgy Svyrydenko (4 June 1945 – May 1946)

===== 241st Guards Rifle Regiment =====
- Lieutenant Colonel Nikolay Budarin (1 March 1943 – Killed in action 6 November 1943)
- Major Panteley Nechay (acting; November–December 1943)
- Lieutenant Colonel (promoted to Colonel) Leonid Myroshnychenko (December 1943 – 22 November 1944)
- Lieutenant Colonel Aleksandr Voloshanenko (22 November 1944 – May 1946)

===== 159th Guards Artillery Regiment =====
- Lieutenant Colonel Nikanor Lyovkin (1 March – November 1943)
- Lieutenant Colonel (promoted to Colonel) Pavel Rylkov (December 1943 – critically wounded 17 February 1945)
- Lieutenant Colonel Subbotin (February–March 1945)
- Lieutenant Colonel Korotkikh (April – 5 October 1945)
- Lieutenant Colonel Grigory Zagorulko (5 October 1945 – May 1946)

==== Battalion commanders ====
===== 84th Separate Guards Antitank Battalion =====
- Major Ivan Yasko (1943 – May 1946)

== Postwar ==
The division remained in Germany with the 47th Army's 9th Guards Rifle Corps, part of the Group of Soviet Occupation Forces in Germany. In February 1946 the army was disbanded and the division withdrawn to Ivanovo in the Moscow Military District. After arriving in the district, it replaced the disbanded 267th Rifle Division as part of the 1st Guards Rifle Corps at Tula. In May, it was redesignated as the 17th Separate Guards Rifle Brigade and was subsequently transferred to the 13th Guards Rifle Corps. Around the same time the brigade moved to Kaluga. The 17th Guards moved to Ryazan in April 1947 and to Kharkov in the Kiev Military District in the fall of 1948. From Kharkov the brigade relocated to Chuguyev, part of the 20th Guards Rifle Corps. Gorishny commanded the brigade until September 1949, when he took command of another division.

In October 1953, it was converted into the 64th Guards Mechanized Division, with the 159th, 205th, and 216th Guards Mechanized Regiments and the 380th Tank Regiment. On 27 July 1954, the 64th Guards was converted into the 14th Guards Tank Division. Simultaneously, the 205th Guards Mechanized Regiment was disbanded. The 427th Guards Mechanized Regiment instead joined the division. On 18 November, it became a heavy tank division. At the same time, the 159th and 216th Guards Mechanized Regiments became the 283rd and 389th Guards Heavy Tank Regiments, respectively. In May 1957 it became part of the newly arrived 6th Guards Tank Army.

By the early 1960s the division included the 283rd and 389th Guards and the 380th Heavy Tank Regiments. On 11 January 1965 it was renumbered as the 75th Guards to restore its World War II numbering, and on 11 April it became a regular tank division. By the late 1980s, the division included the 358th Guards Motor Rifle Regiment, the 42nd Guards, 283rd Guards, and 380th Tank Regiments, and the 577th Artillery Regiment, all at Chuguyev. On 1 July 1989, as part of Gorbachev-inspired reductions, it was downsized into the 5362nd Weapons and Equipment Storage Base. The storage base was disbanded in June 1990.

== Sources and references ==
=== Bibliography ===
- Soldat.ru forum data on history of the division
- Bonn, Keith E., ed. (2005). Slaughterhouse: The Handbook of the Eastern Front. Bedford, Pennsylvania: Aberjona Press. ISBN 978-0971765092.
- Dunn, Walter S. (1997). Kursk: Hitler's Gamble, 1943. Westport: Praeger. ISBN 978-0275957339. Archived from the original on 2017-10-21 – via Questia.
- Dunn, Walter S. (2000). Soviet Blitzkrieg: The Battle for White Russia, 1944. Boulder, Colorado: Lynne Rienner Publishers. ISBN 978-1555878801. Archived from the original on 2017-09-07 – via Questia.
- Feskov, V.I.; Golikov, V.I.; Kalashnikov, K.A.; Slugin, S.A. (2013). Вооруженные силы СССР после Второй Мировой войны: от Красной Армии к Советской [The Armed Forces of the USSR after World War II: From the Red Army to the Soviet: Part 1 Land Forces] (in Russian). Tomsk: Scientific and Technical Literature Publishing. ISBN 978-5895035306.
- Glantz, David M.; Orenstein, Harold S. (1999). The Battle for Kursk 1943: The Soviet General Staff Study. London: Taylor & Francis (Frank Cass). ISBN 0714649333. – This report, commissioned by the Soviet General Staff in 1944, was designed to educate the Red Army on how to conduct war operations. It was classified secret until its declassification in 1964, and was later edited and translated to English by Orenstein and Glantz. Its original title was Collection of materials for the study of war experience, no. 11 (Russian: Сборник материалов по изучению опыта Великой Отечественной войны № 11, Sbornik materialov po izucheniiu opyta Velikoi Otechestvennoi voiny № 11)
- Glantz, David M.; Orenstein, Harold S., eds. (2005). Belorussia 1944: The Soviet General Staff Study. London: Taylor & Francis e-Library. ISBN 0203309200.
- Glantz, David M.; House, Jonathan M. (2004) [1999]. The Battle of Kursk. Lawrence, Kansas: University Press of Kansas. ISBN 978-0700613359.
- Glantz, David M. (2016). Battle for Belorussia: The Red Army's Forgotten Campaign of October 1943 – April 1944. With Mary E. Glantz. Lawrence, Kansas: University Press of Kansas. ISBN 978-0700623297.
- Grechko, Andrei, ed. (1976). "Бахмачская стрелковая дивизия" [Bakhmach Rifle Division]. Советская военная энциклопедия [Soviet Military Encyclopedia] (in Russian). Vol. 1: А – Бюро [A–Bureau]. Moscow: Voenizdat. pp. 410–411.
- Grylev, A.N. (1970). "Перечень № 5. II. Гвардейские стрелковые и мотострелковые дивизии" [List (Perechen) No. 5 Part II. Guards Rifle and Mountain Rifle Divisions] (in Russian). Moscow: Voenizdat. Archived from the original on 28 August 2017.
- Ogarkov, Nikolay, ed. (1979a). "Сумско-Киевская стрелковая дивизия" [Sumy–Kiev Rifle Division]. Советская военная энциклопедия [Soviet Military Encyclopedia] (in Russian). Vol. 7: Радиоконтроль – Тачанка [Radio Control–Tachanka]. Moscow: Voenizdat. pp. 594–595.
- Ogarkov, Nikolay, ed. (1979b). "Синельниковско-Будапештская стрелковая дивизия" [Sinelnikovo–Budapest Rifle Division]. Советская военная энциклопедия [Soviet Military Encyclopedia] (in Russian). Vol. 7: Радиоконтроль – Тачанка [Radio Control–Tachanka]. Moscow: Voenizdat. p. 349.
- Pakin, B.G.; Kochnev, K.F., eds. (1996). О войне и товарищах. Сборник воспоминаний [On War and Comrades: A Collection of Memories] (in Russian). Krasnograd: KMP.
- Tsapayev, D.A.; et al. (2014). Великая Отечественная: Комдивы. Военный биографический словарь [The Great Patriotic War: Division Commanders. Military Biographical Dictionary] (in Russian). Vol. 3. Moscow: Kuchkovo Pole. ISBN 978-5995003823.

==== Military documents ====
- Slutsky, Lieutenant Colonel; Dotsenko, Major (1944a). "Журнал боевых действий 75 гв. сд, Период с 06.01.1944 по 31.01.1944 г." [Combat Journal of the 75th Guards Rifle Division, 6–31 January 1944]. Pamyat Naroda (in Russian). Ministry of Defense of the Russian Federation. (Central Archives of the Russian Ministry of Defence, fond 997, opus 1, file 84)
