= 300th Rifle Division =

300th Rifle Division (July 10, 1941 - April 16, 1943) 300th Rifle Division (August 9, 1943 - April 14, 1946)
- Active: 1941–1946
- Country: Soviet Union
- Branch: Red Army
- Type: Infantry
- Size: Division
- Engagements: Operation Barbarossa; Battle of Kiev (1941); First Battle of Kharkov; Second Battle of Kharkov; Operation Blue; Battle of Stalingrad; Operation Uranus; Operation Little Saturn; Battle of Rostov (1943); Soviet invasion of Manchuria; Battle of Mutanchiang
- Battle honours: Harbin (2nd Formation)

Commanders
- Notable commanders: Col. Pavel Ionovich Kuznetsov; Col. Serafim Petrovich Merkulov; Col. Ivan Mikhailovich Afonin; Maj. Gen. Andrei Pavlovich Karnov; Maj. Gen. Kornily Cherepanov

The 300th Rifle Division began service as a standard Red Army rifle division shortly after the German invasion, and fought in the southwestern part of the Soviet-German front for nearly two years following. It was able to escape the encirclement east of Kiev in September, 1941, and then fought to defend, and later to try to liberate, the city of Kharkov during 1941-42. After falling back under the weight of the German 1942 summer offensive, the division began distinguish itself during Operation Uranus in late 1942, when it helped defeat the German attempt to relieve Sixth Army and later in the pursuit of the defeated Axis forces and the second liberation of Rostov-na-Donu. In recognition of these successes it was raised to Guards status as the 87th Guards Rifle Division. A second 300th Rifle Division was raised a few months later and fought briefly but very successfully against the Japanese in Manchuria in August 1945. The second formation became the 3rd Tank Division in the Far East postwar and was redesignated as the 46th Tank Division in 1957 before disbanding in 1959.

== 1st Formation ==
The division began forming on July 10, 1941 at Krasnograd in the Kharkov Military District. Its order of battle was as follows:

- 1049th Rifle Regiment
- 1051st Rifle Regiment
- 1053rd Rifle Regiment
- 822nd Artillery Regiment
- 336th Antitank Battalion (from December, 1941)
- 416th Antiaircraft Battery (later 581st Antiaircraft Battalion)
- 355th Reconnaissance Company
- 591st Sapper Battalion
- 756th Signal Battalion (later 282nd Signal Company)
- 340th Medical/Sanitation Battalion
- 389th Chemical Defense (Anti-gas) Company
- 726th Motor Transport Company
- 386th Field Bakery
- 643rd Divisional Veterinary Hospital
- 972nd Field Postal Station
- 856th Field Office of the State Bank

Col. Pavel Ionovich Kuznetzov was appointed to command of the division on the day it began assembling.

Just a month after forming, the 300th was assigned to 38th Army of Southwestern Front, just as that Army was itself forming up. It first began to reach the front on August 12 and remained in that Army and that Front until May, 1942. On September 1 it was helping to contain the 1st Panzer Army's bridgehead across the Dniepr River at Kremenchug. As the German attack penetrated the Soviet lines, most of the division fell back to the east, and so avoided being encircled in the Kiev pocket.

=== Battles for Kharkov ===
On October 2, Col. Serafim Petrovich Merkulov took over command of the division from Colonel Kuznetzov. The 300th fought in the defense of Kharkov in October, after which, in November, it was reported as having been reduced to a strength of 2,684 men. In spite of this, the division went on to take part in the winter counteroffensive.

During the Soviet offensive phase of the Second Battle of Kharkov, which began on May 12, 1942, 38th Army deployed the 300th, along with the 124th and 226th Rifle Divisions and one regiment of the 81st Rifle Division, on the penetration sector of Dragunovka, Peschanoe, and Piatnitskoe, and reinforced them with two tank brigades and almost all the army artillery assets. Despite this, and possibly due to its still-depleted state, the division played a secondary role in the offensive. In its report on the first day's operations, 38th Army staff does not mention the division at all, although in fact it did attempt to seize German positions around Piatnitskoe with a multi-battalion task force. This was repulsed with heavy losses.

During the first half of the following day, 38th Army's shock group (less the 300th) made impressive gains as the German lines fell back. However, starting at 1300 hrs., a concerted German counterthrust, led by 3rd and 23rd Panzer Divisions and supported by three infantry regiments, struck the advancing Soviet forces "on the nose" and sent them reeling back. Under this pressure, the shaken rifle divisions withdrew as best they could to the Bolshaia Babka River, where the 300th was already positioned. This temporarily ended 38th Army's role in the offensive.

On May 18, as a crisis began to develop due to a German counteroffensive against the south face of the Barvenkovo salient, Marshal S.K. Timoshenko ordered 38th Army to renew its attacks. The 81st and 300th Divisions were to launch a secondary attack against Peschanoe. The Army's attacks began on time at 0700 hrs. but were staged on much too broad a front; elements of the division penetrated only 1.5 – 2 km at heavy cost before grinding to a halt. Over the following day or two local battles were conducted to improve positions, but the offensive on this sector was definitively finished on May 20.

== Operation Blue and Stalingrad ==
By June 1 the division had been transferred to the 28th Army, still in Southwestern Front. Prior to the start of Operation Blue, German Sixth Army launched a preliminary attack, Operation Wilhelm, against the 28th Army bridgehead over the Donets at and south of Volchansk, from June 10–15. The 300th was caught up in this and was largely encircled in spite of beginning to retreat almost immediately; on the 13th Marshal Timoshenko reported it was "seriously battered". By July 1 it had been removed to the reserves of Southwestern Front. On July 29, Colonel Merkulov was reassigned to command of the 304th Rifle Division, and was replaced by Col. Ivan Mikhailovich Afonin.

As the German offensive pressed on, the division was transferred again to the 21st Army of Stalingrad Front. In the process of fighting in these unequal circumstances the division took further losses, and was withdrawn into the Reserve of the Supreme High Command at Tuymazy in August for rebuilding.

On October 2, the rebuilt 300th was assigned to 4th Reserve Army, back in Stalingrad Front, for future employment in the Stalingrad region, although the deteriorating situation in 62nd Army forced its early commitment to the fight for the city. At this stage of the battle the Supreme High Command was apprehensive that the enemy might attempt to cross the Volga, so the division was ordered to deploy on the east bank of the river on October 11, along a sector running from Lake Tuzhilkino to the mouth of the Akhtuba River. The division next saw action later that month, when two rifle battalions of the 1049th Rifle Regiment attempted an assault amphibious landing across the river aimed at the village of Latashanka, in an attempt to relieve German pressure on the defenders of Rynok and the northern factory districts. The effort failed, at a cost of at least 900 men killed, wounded or captured.

The division next saw action with the beginning of the operation to encircle the German/Romanian forces at Stalingrad. The 300th, now in 51st Army crossed to the right bank of the Volga by a pontoon bridge downstream from the city, and formed part of the second echelon of the southern pincer which completed the encirclement by November 22.

=== Operation Little Saturn ===
Stalingrad Front faced two challenges following the encirclement: first, to prevent a German relief operation of the pocket, and second, to exploit the huge gaps in the Axis lines and drive the enemy out of the Caucasus steppes. To this end, on December 8, the STAVKA formed the new 5th Shock Army, which included the 300th, with four other rifle divisions, 4th Mechanized Corps, two tank corps, and the 3rd Guards Cavalry Corps. By the end of the day on December 10, the division, with the 315th Rifle Division alongside, had occupied jumping-off positions on the eastern bank of the Don, opposite Nizhne-Chirskaia, supporting 4th Mechanized Corps. The focus at this time was on the defensive battle, and on December 21 elements of the division helped stop one of the last attempts of Army Group Don to break the encirclement.

On December 26, 5th Shock Army headquarters issued Operational Summary No. 24, which stated in part:

"On the basis of the STAVKA's orders, 300th Rifle Division and 4th Cavalry Corps were transferred from 5th Shock Army to 2nd Guards Army."

At this time, with the Stalingrad encirclement secured, 5th Tank, 5th Shock, and 2nd Guards Armies all turned their attentions to the ad hoc Corps Mieth holding in the great bend of the Don, headquartered at the town of Tormosin. On December 29, 2nd Guards Army began a westward advance across the river. An operational group was formed under the command of Maj. Gen. I.G. Kreizer (former and future commander of 2nd Guards) consisting of 2nd Guards Mechanized Corps, 4th Cavalry Corps, and 33rd Guards, 300th and 387th Rifle Divisions. This group made great strides through the rag-tag Axis forces towards Tormosin over the next 24 hours, and in order to ease command and control in this operation and others, early on December 30, most of Stalingrad Front became the re-created Southern Front. The division was across the Don somewhat north of the confluence with the Aksai River on December 31, the same day Tormosin was liberated by the mechanized corps. During the next two months the division continued exploiting the Soviet victory along the Don River towards and then past Rostov-na-Donu. On February 8, 1943, Col. Kirill Yakovlevich Tymchik took over command of the division, whose advance finally came to a halt along the Mius River. On February 21, Southern Front reported to STAVKA that:

"The 300th Rifle Division is fighting on the southeastern outskirts of Novaia Nadezhda, Alekseevka, and Aleksandrovka (I repeat, on the southeast outskirts of these points)..."

All of these points were on the left bank of the Mius, as the overstretched Soviet forces were unable to penetrate the German defenses on the right bank, based on fortifications they had built a year earlier.

On April 16, 1943, in recognition of the division's prowess both on the defense and during the offensive that crushed the trapped German Sixth Army and threw their forces out of the Caucasus, it was re-designated as the 87th Guards Rifle Division. Colonel Tymchik remained in command during the re-designation, and held command of 87th Guards for the duration of the war, being promoted to Major General on November 2, 1944.

== 2nd Formation ==
The second 300th Rifle Division was formed, along with the 87th Rifle Corps, in the 1st Red Banner Army on August 9, 1943. Its order of battle remained the same as the first formation, with the addition of a Divisional Training Battalion. Col. Vasilii Vladimirovich Bardadin was appointed as commanding officer on the same date. The division served in the Maritime Group of Forces, in 1st Army or in Far Eastern Front reserves, for the duration. On May 31, 1944, Maj. Gen. Andrei Pavlovich Karnov took over command from Colonel Bardadin.

Transferring from the west alongside the new 1st Red Banner Army commander, Afanasy Beloborodov, Major General Kornily Cherepanov took command of the division before the invasion of Manchuria. When the Soviet Union declared war on Japan on August 9, 1945, the division, now in 26th Rifle Corps, joined in the advance into Manchuria. In preparation it was reinforced with a battalion of 13 SU-76s and also had the following assets attached:

- 1 howitzer regiment (122mm)
- 8 152mm gun-howitzers
- 8 203mm howitzers
- 3 305mm howitzers
- 1 tank company
- 1 sapper battalion

In addition, the 257th Tank Brigade was attached on the second day. 26th Corps had to take a route through mountainous terrain towards the city of Mutanchiang; the advance was expected to take 18 days, but after just eight days the 300th was across the Mutan River and was clearing the city. It accomplished this by creating a forward detachment consisting of the 1049th Rifle Regiment, loaded in all the truck-drawn support that could be found. This was the first infantry able to reinforce the tank brigade and the divisional SU-76 battalion at the river-crossing sites. In recognition of this feat, the division was given the honorific Harbin (Russian: Харбинская). During the fighting, Cherepanov was seriously wounded, resulting in the amputation of his hand, and for his leadership was made a Hero of the Soviet Union.

On April 14, 1946 at Pokrovka in Primorsky Krai the division became the 3rd Tank Division (3-я танковая Харбинская дивизия) (1946–57). After a brief period as the 46th Tank Division (1957–59) the division was disbanded, still located at Pokrovka.

Later the Strategic Rocket Forces' 4th Harbin Rocket Division was given the name 'Harbin' in succession to the 46th Tank Division.
