= Porfiry Chanchibadze =

Soviet colonel general (1901–1950)

- Born: 13 January 1901; Ozurgeti, Russian Empire (today in Georgia)
- Died: 14 March 1950 (aged 49) Tbilisi, Georgian SSR, USSR
- Allegiance: Soviet Union
- Branch: Soviet Army
- Service years: 1921–1950
- Rank: Colonel General
- Commands: 107th Motorized Rifle Division; 13th Guards Army Corps; 2nd Guards Army; 11th Rifle Corps
- Conflicts: Russian Civil War; World War II; Eastern Front
- Awards: Hero of the Soviet Union

Porfiry Georgiyevich Chanchibadze (Georgian: პორფილე ჩანჩიბაძე, Russian: Порфирий Георгиевич Чанчибадзе); 13 December 1901 - 14 March 1950) was a Soviet Colonel General and a Hero of the Soviet Union.

== Biography ==
Chanchibadze was born in Ozurgeti. He participated in the Russian Civil War.

At the outbreak of the Great Patriotic War, he was in command of the 120th Rifle Regiment in the Far East, which was transferred in July 1941 to the Western Front. In July 1941, he was appointed commander of the 107th Motor Rifle Division, which, as part of the 30th Army, fought in the Battle of Smolensk (1941), defended itself in October 1941, and from December 1941 launched a counteroffensive during the Battle of Moscow. For the successful completion of complex command tasks and the courage and heroism shown at the same time, the division was renamed the 2nd Guards Motor Rifle (12 January 1942). Subsequently, the division took part in the Rzhev–Vyazma and Rzhev-Sychevka offensive operations. On 23 October 1942 the 2nd Guards Motor Rifle Division was renamed the 49th Guards Rifle Division and assigned to be re-equipped.

In November 1942, Chanchibadze was appointed commander of the 13th Guards Rifle Corps. The corps participated in the Battles of Stalingrad, Rostov, Mius, Donbass, Melitopol, and the Crimean Offensive. He was promoted to major general in May 1942, and to lieutenant general in September 1943.

On 4 June 1944 Chanchibadze became commander of the 2nd Guards Army which he led in the Siauliai, Memel and East Prussian offensive operations. He commanded the army during the Assault on Königsberg.

By the decree of the Presidium of the Supreme Soviet of the USSR of 19 April 1945, Lieutenant General Chanchibadze was awarded the title of Hero of the Soviet Union for the skillful management of his Army in the defeat of Armee-Abteilung Samland.

On 24 June 1945 Lieutenant General P.G. Chanchibadze took part in the Victory Parade in Moscow.

After the disbandment of the 2nd Guards Army in September 1945, Colonel-General P.G. Chanchibadze was at the disposal of the Main Directorate of Personnel of the NKO of the USSR. In March 1946 he was commander of the 11th Rifle Corps. In 1948 he graduated from the Military Academy of the General Staff of the Armed Forces of Russia and became in June 1948 commander of the 13th Guards Rifle Corps in the Gorky Military District.

Porfiry Georgievich Chanchibadze died on 14 March 1950. He was buried in Moscow in the 4th section of the Novodevichy cemetery.

== Sources ==
- Generals.dk
- Warhe.ruroes (in Russian)
- mil.ru (in Russian)
