= 2nd Anti-Aircraft Artillery Division (Soviet Union) =

- Active: October 1942–May 1946
- Country: Soviet Union
- Branch: Red Army (Soviet Army from 1946)
- Type: Anti-Aircraft Artillery
- Engagements: World War II
- Decorations: Order of Kutuzov 2nd class
- Battle honours: Sivash

The 2nd Anti-Aircraft Artillery Division (Russian: 2-я зенитная артиллерийская дивизия) was an anti-aircraft artillery division of the Soviet Union's Red Army during World War II.

Formed in late October 1942, the division was sent to the front in the Battle of Stalingrad. It then fought in the advance across southern Ukraine during 1943 and in spring 1944 participated in the Crimean Offensive, the capture of Crimea, and received the Sivash honorific for its actions. In the summer of that year the 2nd was relocated to the Baltic and fought there until the end of the war in May 1945, participating in the Battle of Memel and the Battle of Königsberg. It received the Order of Kutuzov at the end of the war and was reorganized into a brigade postwar in 1946.

== World War II ==
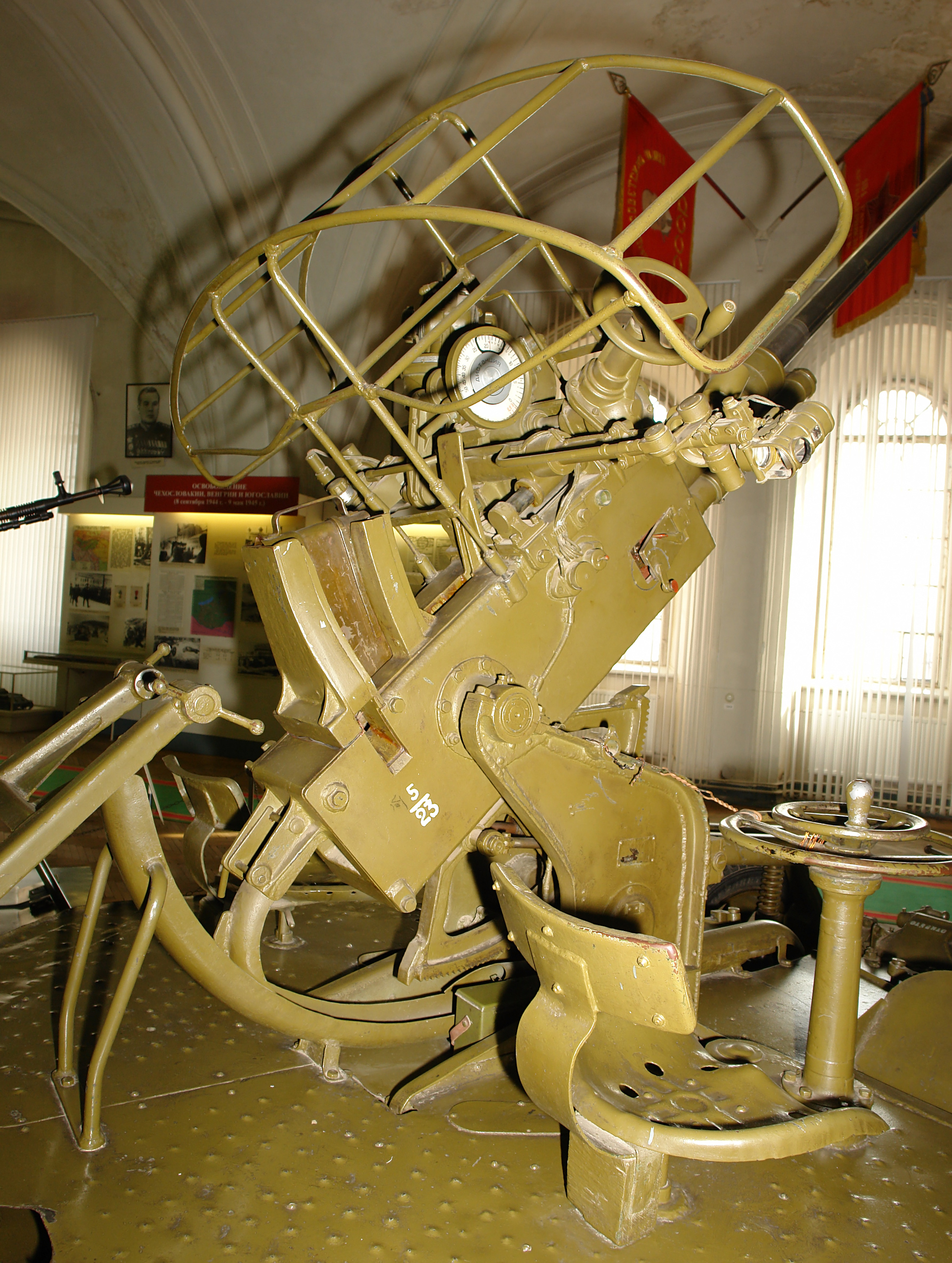
A 37 mm AA gun of the type used by the division during World War II

The 2nd Anti-Aircraft Artillery Division of the Reserve of the Supreme High Command (RVGK) began forming on 31 October 1942 in the Moscow Military District under the command of Lieutenant Colonel Nikolay Nikitin. On 23 November, after completing its formation, the division arrived on the Stalingrad Front south of Stalingrad, and joined the 51st Army. It provided air defense for the 51st and 57th Armies during the creation of the outer encirclement line of the pocket formed by German troops trapped in the city, the counterattack towards Kotelnikovo, and the attack towards Salsk. From 12 December, when Operation Winter Storm, a German relief attempt on the Stalingrad pocket, was launched in the Kotelnikovo area, the division helped repulse increased German air raids. The 2nd also downed or forced German transport planes off course, preventing aerial resupply of the trapped German troops. During the battle, the division was credited with downing 57 enemy aircraft, knocking out seven tanks, and killing up to a company of enemy soldiers. By 1 January 1943, it included the 1069th, 1113th, and 1117th Anti-Aircraft Artillery Regiments as part of 51st Army. Its 1086th Regiment was detached to the Southwestern Front's 5th Shock Army at the time, and would remain there for several months.

From January, the division provided air defense for the 51st Army during the Southern Front's Salsk-Rostov Offensive. Its regiments advanced alongside the army when it reached the Don at Kalach. Colonel Alexander Mukharsky replaced Nikitin around March, during which the division provided air defense for Southern Front units against massive enemy airstrikes. In April, the 1086th rejoined the main body of the division, which was transferred to the 44th Army. The 1069th Regiment was directly subordinated to front headquarters in June. The entire division was transferred to the 28th Army in July. In August, the 1069th Regiment was detached to the 2nd Guards Army. The division transferred to the 2nd Guards Army in September, with the 1086th Regiment remaining with 28th Army. In October, the division was split, with the 1086th and 1113th Regiments detached to the 28th Army and division headquarters with the 1069th and 1117th Regiments remaining with the 2nd Guards Army. On 5 October, Lieutenant Colonel (promoted to colonel on 10 October) Alexander Kovalyov replaced Mukharsky, who was transferred to another unit. The division was directly subordinated to the 4th Ukrainian Front (the former Southern Front) headquarters in November.

In December, the division was operationally subordinated to the 4th Ukrainian Front's 3rd Guards Army. The 2nd provided air defense on the line of the Dnieper from Velikaya Lepetikha and Malaya Lepetikha to Sergeyevka. In January 1944, the 1117th Regiment was detached to the 51st Army. The main body of the division (excluding the 1117th) was directly subordinated to the front headquarters in February. In March, the division headquarters with the 1086th and 1113th Regiments transferred to the 51st Army, while the 1069th Regiment remained directly subordinated to the front. From March, the division covered the crossing of Soviet troops into Crimea over the Sivash, then provided air defense for the army and front in the Crimean Offensive. In April, the 1069th Regiment rejoined the rest of the division with the 51st Army. On 24 April the 2nd received the honorific Sivash. In May, after the end of the fighting in Crimea, the division was transferred to the RVGK. It became part of the Separate Coastal Army in June, remaining behind in Crimea.

From 4 August, the division was part of the 1st Baltic Front, operationally subordinated to the 2nd Guards Army, after relocated north into the Baltic region. In the fall, the division fought in the Battle of Memel and the pursuit of German troops into the Courland Pocket. In December, the 2nd transferred to the 4th Shock Army. In February 1945, the division transferred to the 11th Guards Army in the Samland Group of Forces, besieging German troops trapped in the Samland Peninsula. During April it transferred to the 3rd Belorussian Front, fighting in the Battle of Königsberg. In May the 2nd was awarded the Order of Kutuzov, 2nd class, for its actions.

== Postwar ==
After the end of the war, the division was transferred to Libava in the Baltic Military District. On 7 May 1946, it was reorganized into the 178th Anti-Aircraft Artillery Brigade, under Kovalyov's command. Kovalyov was transferred to another position in April 1947.
