= 3rd Guards Motor Rifle Division =

Motor rifle division of the Soviet Union

3rd Guards Volnovakha Red Banner Order of Suvorov Rifle Division
- Active: 1941–1993
- Country: Soviet Union
- Branch: Red Army (Soviet Army from 1946)
- Type: Infantry
- Engagements: World War II
- Decorations: Order of the Red Banner; Order of Suvorov
- Battle honours: Volnovakha

Commanders
- Notable commanders: Nikolai Gagen; Kantemir Tsalikov

The 3rd Guards Volnovakha Red Banner Order of Suvorov Motor Rifle Division (Military Unit Number 61415) was a division of the Soviet Army from 1941 to around 1992. It traced its history from the highly decorated 3rd Guards Rifle Division of World War II. The 3rd Guards Rifle Division was formed from the 153rd Rifle Division.

== History ==
=== 1941 to mid-1943 ===
From 20 September to 9 November, the 3rd Guards fought as part of the 54th Army of the Leningrad Front in the area of Mga and Sinyavino. From 10 to 14 November, the division relocated to the left flank of the army, south of the city of Volkhov. From 15 November to 28 December, the division fought operations near Volkhov and then pursued the retreating German troops to the station of Pogostye.

In the summer of 1942, the 3rd Guards was brought back up to strength and entered the Reserve of the Supreme High Command. From late August to September 1942, the division took part in the Sinyavino Offensive of the Volkhov Front. The division was tasked with leading the breakthrough of the German defenses in the area of the Kruglaya grove and the capture of the station of Sinyavino. On 27 August, the 5th Guards Rifle Regiment advanced towards Gontovaya Lipka. From 10 September to 15 October, the division fought on the hill of Kruglaya grove.

In early December 1942, the 3rd Guards was withdrawn from the reserve and transferred to the Stalingrad Front under the 2nd Guards Army. In winter conditions, the division completed a difficult forced march of approximately 240 kilometers from the railway station to the concentration areas. From 15 to 31 December 1942, the division engaged in active combat operations near Stalingrad.

During Operation Uranus on the Myshkova river line, the 2nd Guards Army played a decisive role in repelling the counterattack of the German Kotelnikovo group. On 17 December, the division was assigned to concentrate on a defensive line near the sovkhoz of Krep on the banks of the Myshkova river. On 20 December, the division fought heavy battles in Vasilyevka area. Elements of the 3rd Guards defended the sector from Ivanovka to Kapkinka, repelling the main offensive in the sector from Vasilyevka to Kapkinka. On 24 December, the division went on the offensive with the army and forced a German retreat to the south. On 29 December, the division reached the area of the Lenin sovkhoz (10 km east of Kotelnikovo) by 15:00. On 31 December, at 10:30, the division fought on the line from hill 107.8 to the northern outskirts of Verkhny Vasilyevsky to the eastern outskirts of Komissarovsky. Continuing the offensive toward Rostov, the division participated in the liberation of Novocherkassk on 13 February 1943, and three days later reached the Mius River, where heavy German resistance forced it to take defensive positions. On 22 February, the 22nd Guards Artillery Regiment was awarded the Order of the Red Banner.

=== Summer 1943 to May 1945 ===
In August–September 1943, the 3rd Guards Division took part in the Donbas strategic offensive. The division took part in liberating the inhabited localities of Volnovakha (on 10 September 1943) and Bolshoy Tokmak (on 20 September 1943). The 3rd Guards Rifle Division was among the units to receive the Volnovakha honorific in recognition of its actions.

In late September, during the Melitopol Offensive, the 3rd Guards reached the lower reaches of the Dnieper and the Black Sea coast, liberating Kakhovka on 2 November 1943. In December, as part of the 4th Ukrainian Front, the division eliminated the German bridgehead on the left bank of the Dnieper (in the area of Kherson) after a fierce battle. In February 1944, the army was transferred to the area of the Isthmus of Perekop, and in April–May it took part in the Crimean Offensive, liberating Yevpatoriya on 13 April 1944, and, together with other forces of the 4th Ukrainian Front and the Black Sea Fleet, Sevastopol on 9 May. In May–June, the 2nd Guards Army was redeployed to the area of the cities of Dorogobuzh and Yelnya. From 20 May, it was in reserve, and on 8 July it was assigned to the 1st Baltic Front. In July, during the Šiauliai Offensive, the division repelled German counterattacks to the west and northwest of Šiauliai. In October, it participated in the Memel Offensive, occupying the town of Pagėgiai on 21 October. On 20 December, it was reassigned to the 3rd Belorussian Front. In January–April 1945, during the East Prussian Offensive, it broke through German defenses and eliminated, in conjunction with other troops, encircled German groups southwest of Königsberg and the Sambia group.

=== Postwar ===
After the end of the war, the 3rd Guards Division was reduced to the 13th Separate Guards Rifle Brigade on 31 July 1946. It was reformed as the 3rd Guards Rifle Division again in October 1953. The division was reformed as the 3rd Guards Motor Rifle Division in Klaipėda in Lithuania on 25 June 1957.

The 3rd Guards Rifle Division was assigned to the Voronezh Military District under the 11th Guards Rifle Corps in 1945–46, and later in 1955 and 1957. When it was reformed on the Baltic coast it became part of the Baltic Military District. In the 1980s, the division became the 3rd Guards Motor Rifle Division for Coastal Defence on 12 October 1989 and transferred to the Baltic Fleet. With the dissolution of the USSR it became part of the North Western Group of Forces. On 1 September 1993, the division was disbanded.

== Assignments ==
- Western Special Military District, 22nd Army, 62nd Rifle Corps (from mid-June to July 1941)
- Western Front, 20th Army (July - early August 1941)
- Western Front, 16th Army (Soviet Union) (August - early September 1941)
- Western Front, a reserve of 20 Army (from 6 to 20 September 1941)
- Stavka Reserve (20 September - early October 1941)
- Leningrad Front, 54th Army (c (no later) 1 October 1941 to (no earlier than that date) July 1, 1942). Since February 1942 in the 4th Guards Rifle Corps.
- Volkhov Front, 2nd Guards Army, 6th Guards Rifle Corps (August - 1 October 1942)
- Don Front - 15 December 1942.
- Stalingrad Front 2nd Guards Army - from 15 to 31 December 1942.
- Southern Front, 2nd Guards Army 13th Guards Rifle Corps - from 1 January to 20 October 1943.
- 4th Ukrainian Front, 2nd Guards Army 13th Guards Rifle Corps - 20 October 1943
- 4th Ukrainian Front, 2nd Guards Army 13th Guards Rifle Corps – on 8 July 1944.
- 1st Baltic Front, 2nd Guards Army 13th Guards Rifle Corps – 8 July to 20 December 1944.
- 3rd Belorussian Front, 2nd Guards Army 13th Guards Rifle Corps – from 20 December 1944
- 3rd Belorussian Front, Samland Group of Forces, 2nd Guards Army, 11th Guards Rifle Corps – on 1 April 1945

== Division units ==
=== On 5 July 1941 ===
- 435th Rifle Regiment
- 505th Rifle Regiment
- 666th Rifle Regiment
- 122nd Separate Artillery Battalion
- 565th Light Artillery Regiment
- 581st Howitzer Artillery Regiment
- 150th Separate Anti-Tank Battalion
- 460th Separate Anti-Aircraft Artillery Battalion
- 238th Separate Reconnaissance Battalion
- 208th Separate Sapper Battalion
- 297th Separate Communications Battalion
- 362nd Separate Medical-Sanitary Battalion
- 7th Separate Chemical Defense Company
- 193rd Auto Transport Company
- Field bakery and the divisional veterinary hospital.

=== In December 1942 ===
- 5th Guards Rifle Regiment
- 9th Guards Rifle Regiment
- 13th Guards Rifle Regiment (see ru:13-й гвардейский стрелковый полк)
- 22nd Guards Artillery Regiment
- 11th Guards Mortar Battalion
- 15th Guards Mortar Battalion
- 10th Guards Sapper Battalion
- 3rd Guards Battalion

== Commanders ==
The following officers commanded the first formation of the 153rd Rifle Division and the 3rd Guards Rifle Division:

- Colonel Nikolai Gagen (16 July 1940 – 18 December 1941; promoted to major general on 9 November 1941)
- Colonel Anatoly Krasnov (19 December 1941 – 8 March 1942)
- Major General Nikolay Martynchuk (9 March – 17 October 1942)
- Colonel Kantemir Tsalikov (18 October 1942 – 20 May 1944; promoted to major general on 27 November 1942)
- Colonel Leonty Karida (21 May – 28 June 1944)
- Colonel Grigory Polishchuk (29 June 1944 – 18 October 1946; promoted to major general on 5 May 1945)
- Colonel Aleksandr Glebovich Maykov (December 1946 – 5 May 1947)
- Lieutenant General Mark Timofeyevich Karakoz (March 1947 – 19 March 1949)
- Major General Yemelyan Vasilievich Kozik (19 March 1949 – 15 December 1951)
- Colonel Sergey Yepifanovich Shelkovy (25 December 1951 – 25 December 1953, major general 3 August 1953)
- Major General Grigory Polishchuk (25 November 1953 – 10 November 1956)
- Colonel Nikolay Ivanovich Gordychuk (10 November 1956 – 10 December 1960, major general 25 May 1959)
- Colonel Pyotr Fyodorovich Rodionov (10 December 1960 – 18 June 1962, major general 27 April 1962)
- Colonel Roman Markovich Koletvintsev (18 June 1962 – 20 March 1965)
- Colonel Ivan Yakovlevich Kulikov (20 March 1965 – November 1966)
- Colonel Ivan Andreyevich Kibal (Unknown – 6 December 1973, major general 19 February 1968)
- Colonel Vitaly Andreyevich Tsapko (6 December 1973 – Unknown, major general 25 April 1975)

== Awards ==
- 18 September 1941 - the 153rd Rifle Division received the name:'3rd Guards Rifle Division '.
- 10 September 1943 - The division was given the name 'Volnovakha'.
- 24 April 1944 - the division was awarded the Order of the Red Banner
- 5 April 1945 - the division was awarded the Order of Suvorov
