= 69th Rifle Division =

69th Rifle Division 69th Motorized Division 107th Tank Division 107th Motor Rifle Division
- Active: 1st formation: 1936–1941; 2nd formation: December 1941–1946, October 1953–June 1957
- Country: Soviet Union
- Branch: Red Army (1936-1946); Soviet Army (1946-1957)
- Type: Division
- Role: Infantry
- Engagements: Battle of Kursk; Lower Dnieper Offensive; Operation Bagration; Lublin-Brest Offensive; East Pomeranian Offensive; Berlin Strategic Offensive
- Decorations: Order of the Red Banner (2) (2nd formation); Order of Suvorov (2nd formation); Order of Kutuzov (2nd formation)
- Battle honours: Sevsk (2nd formation)

Commanders
- Notable commanders: A. K. Berestov, F. N. Smekhotvorov, A. G. Frolenkov, Mjr. Gen. M. A. Bogdanov; Mjr. Gen. I. A. Kuzovkov, Hero of the Soviet Union; Maj. Gen. I. I. Sankovski; Mjr. Gen. F. A. Makarov

The 69th Rifle Division was an infantry division of the Red Army and later the Soviet Army, formed twice.

It was first formed in 1936 from the 3rd Kolkhoz Rifle Division in the Soviet Far East, and in the spring of 1941 converted to the 69th Motorized Division. Sent west after the start of Operation Barbarossa, the German invasion of the Soviet Union, it was reorganized into the 107th Tank Division shortly after arriving at the front. The division fought in the Battle of Smolensk before being redesignated the 107th Motor Rifle Division in September. The 107th fought in the Battle of Moscow and became the 2nd Guards Motor Rifle Division in honor of its actions in the battle.

The 69th Rifle Division was reformed in December 1941, distinguishing itself in at least two battles. It was credited with the liberation of the town of Sevsk on 26 August 1943. On 15 October 1943 it made a successful assault crossing of the Dnepr River south of Gomel; 21 officers and men of the division were decorated as Heroes of the Soviet Union for this action. Postwar, the 69th was withdrawn to Vologda, where it remained for the rest of its existence. Between 1946 and 1953 it was reduced to the 25th Separate Rifle Brigade. It became the 69th Motor Rifle Division in 1957 and was reduced to a storage base in 1989.

== 1st Formation ==
Using German Foreign Armies East intelligence data, Poirer and Connor wrote that the division was first organized as the 69th Motorized Rifle Division and was established at Kuibyshev in the Russian SFSR sometime in the early 1930s. However, Crofoot and Avanziani write that the division was established at Khabarovsk, RSFSR, in early 1936 from a cadre provided by the 3rd Rifle Division (Soviet Union).

According to the most recent Russian sources, the 69th was originally formed as the 3rd Kolkhoz Rifle Division of the Special Red Banner Far Eastern Army in 1932. On 21 May 1936, the division was released from Kolkhoz duty and redesignated the 69th Rifle Division. In March 1941, it was reorganized as the 69th Motorized Division, and its 8th Rifle and 222nd Artillery Regiments were disbanded. A separate unit of the 2nd Red Banner Army, the division was stationed in the Blagoveshchensk area.

On 22 June 1941, the day Operation Barbarossa, the German invasion of the Soviet Union, began, Porfiry Chanchibadze was serving as commander of the division's 120th Rifle Regiment. Shortly after the German invasion began, the division was sent west to the front by a General Staff directive of 25 June. On 10 July it unloaded in the Nelidovo and Olenino area. On 15 July (17 July according to rkka.ru), it became the 107th Tank Division. After making a 200-kilometer march, the 107th joined the Reserve Front's 30th Army and took up defensive positions on the line of Bely and Yelnya. During the Battle of Smolensk, the division attacked with 200 tanks on 20 July towards Dukhovshchina in an attempt to take Smolensk, but was repulsed with heavy losses. The division then fought in defensive battles on the Western Front, and had 153 tanks at the beginning of September. Soon after it was redesignated as the 107th Motorized Division, and Chanchibadze became the divisional commander.

On 1 October, the division had only 125 tanks: three KV tanks, 23 T-34s, one BT, 92 T-26s and six T-37s. In early October, the 107th fought in heavy fighting, trapped in a pocket by Operation Typhoon in the Volynovo, Samsonikha, and Bykovo areas. In seventeen days it was able to break out of the encirclement and reach the Mozhaisk Defense Line. Replenished with personnel, artillery, and tanks, the 107th then held positions on the Lama River. In three days of defensive battles in the area of Ilyinsky, Domarino, and Pokrovskoye, the division was credited with destroying 46 tanks, four armored vehicles, and ten guns and mortars. On 12 January 1942, in recognition of its achievements, the 107th was converted into an elite Guards unit, the 2nd Guards Motor Rifle Division.

== 2nd Formation ==
The division was reformed at Tashkent, in the Central Asia Military District, from December 1941 to 14 February 1942. For the duration of the war its main order of battle was as follows:

- 120th Rifle Regiment
- 237th Rifle Regiment
- 303rd Rifle Regiment
- 118th Artillery Regiment
- 99th Sapper Battalion
- 20th Reconnaissance Company.

On 14 February, when Col. (later, Maj. Gen.) M. A. Bogdanov was assigned as divisional commander, the division went to the Reserve of the Supreme High Command, then in March to the Western Front reserves, and finally in April to 50th Army of Western Front, remaining there until February 1943. This sector was mostly quiet during this period.

By 1 March the 69th Rifle Division had been transferred south to the 65th Army of Gen. K. K. Rokossovsky's Central Front. Apart from a brief transfer to the 52nd Army in July 1944 it remained in this Army, commanded by Gen. Pavel Batov, and under Rokossovsky's overall command, for the duration of the war. By June the division had been assigned to the 18th Rifle Corps, where it also remained for the duration of the war. Central Front became Belorussian Front in October, then 1st Belorussian Front in February 1944.

At this point it was necessary to rebuild the division, as casualties from the summer and autumn offensives had reduced the rifle regiments to the effective strength of just two battalions each. At this time, and during the following summer, the division was receiving replacements from the 218th Reserve Rifle Regiment. In November the 69th, along with the rest of 65th Army, transferred to Rokossovsky's 2nd Belorussian Front.

Division honorifics were - Russian: Севская дважды краснознаменная, Орден Красного Знамени, Суворова, Кутузова. (English: Sevsk, twice Red Banner, Order of Suvorov, Order of Kutuzov.)

== Commanders ==
=== 69th Rifle Division ===
- Colonel Athanasius Dmitrievich Shemenkov (June 1938 - December 1940)

=== 107th Tank Division ===
- Colonel Piotr Nikolaevich Domrachev (18 July 1941 - 30 August 1941)
- Colonel Porfiry Chanchibadze (31 August 1941 - 15 September 1941)

=== 107th Motorized Rifle Division ===
- Colonel Porfiry Chanchibadze (16 September 1941 - 12 January 1942)

=== 69th Rifle Division (Second formation) ===
- Major General Mikhail Andreevich Bogdanov (14.02.1942 - 04.01.1943),
- Major General Ivan Alexandrovich Kuzovkov (05.01.1943 - 05.12.1943),
- Major General Iosif Iustinovich Sankovsky (06.12.1943 - 06.09.1944),
- Major General Fyodor Alekseevich Makarov (07.09.1944 - 16.07.1945).

== Postwar ==
Postwar, it was part of the 65th Army's 18th Rifle Corps in the Northern Group of Forces in Poland. After 65th Army became a mechanized army the division became part of the 43rd Army in June 1946. After the army was disbanded the division moved to Vologda later that year. At Vologda it was downsized into the 25th Separate Rifle Brigade, part of the Arkhangelsk Military District (Belomorsky Military District from 1951). In October 1953 it became a division again, with the 120th, 237th, and 303rd Rifle Regiments, as well as the 148th Tank Regiment. In April 1956, the 69th joined the Northern Military District's 44th Special Rifle Corps when the district headquarters was disbanded. On 4 June 1957 the 69th Rifle Division became the 69th Motor Rifle Division, and around the same time the corps became the 44th Special Army Corps. Its rifle regiments were renumbered as the 267th, 268th, and 303rd Motor Rifle Regiments. In 1960, the Northern Military District was abolished and the corps joined the Leningrad Military District, becoming a regular army corps soon afterwards.

On 1 July 1967, after the 44th Corps departed for the Soviet Far East, the 69th Motor Rifle Division became part of the new 26th Army Corps. The 148th Tank Regiment was reorganized into the 87th Separate Tank Battalion in 1987. In the late 1980s, the 69th included the 267th, 268th, and 303rd Motor Rifle Regiments, the 87th Separate Tank Battalion, the 118th Artillery Regiment, and support units, all stationed at Vologda. On 1 June 1989, the division was converted into the 5189th Weapons and Equipment Storage Base. On 19 November 1990, according to CFE treaty reports, the base was equipped with 38 T-55 tanks, 35 PT-76 light tanks, twelve BM-21 Grad multiple rocket launchers, fifteen BTR-50PUM command vehicles, six R-145BM command vehicles, seven BTR-50PU command vehicles, one PRP-3 artillery reconnaissance vehicles, two UR-67 mine clearing vehicles, and four MTU bridgelaying vehicles. The storage base was disbanded in 1993.
