= 49th Guards Rifle Division =

49th Guards Rifle Division (13 October 1942 – 22 October 1945)
- Active: 1942–1945
- Country: Soviet Union
- Branch: Red Army
- Type: Division
- Role: Infantry
- Engagements: Battle of Stalingrad; Second Jassy–Kishinev Offensive; Siege of Budapest; Vienna Offensive
- Decorations: Order of the Red Banner; Order of Suvorov 2nd class
- Battle honours: Kherson

Commanders
- Notable commanders: Vasily Margelov

The 49th Guards Rifle Division was an infantry division of the Red Army. The division was formed in October 1942 from the 2nd Guards Motor Rifle Division.

== Formation ==
The 49th Guards Rifle Division was formed in the Western Front reserves near Moscow on 13 October 1942 from the remains of the 2nd Guards Motor Rifle Division. The unit was immediately assigned to the newly formed 13th Guards Rifle Corps in the 2nd Guards Army. They were sent south to the Stalingrad area in December 1942 and went into action south of Stalingrad. When formed, its order of battle was as follows:

- 144th Guards Rifle Regiment
- 147th Guards Rifle Regiment
- 149th Guards Rifle Regiment
- 100th Guards Artillery Regiment
- 56th Guards Separate Anti-tank Battalion
- 64th Guards Anti-Aircraft Battery (up to 25 April 1943)
- 1st Guards Machine Gun Battalion (up to 1 June 1943)
- 51st Guards Reconnaissance Company
- 57th Guards Separate Sapper Battalion
- 77th Guards Separate Signals Battalion
- 561st (53rd) Medical and Sanitation Battalion
- 52nd Guards Separate Chemical Defense Company
- 609th (53rd) Auto-Transport Company
- 638th (48th) Field Bakery
- 641st (50th) Divisional Veterinary Hospital
- 572nd Field Postal Station
- 44th Field Office of State Bank
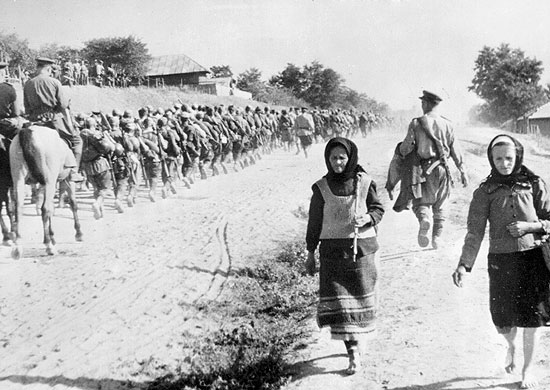
  Troops of the division on the march during the Second Jassy-Kishinev Offensive, late August 1944

Later the division helped liberate Kherson (the name "Khersonskaya" was conferred on the division). It took part in the liberation of Romania and Hungary.

The division ended the war in Austria. By this time the division had the following honorifics: Khersonskaya, Order of the Red Banner, Order of Suvorov 2nd Class.

== Postwar ==
After the end of the war the division became a part of the Southern Group of Forces, being reorganised as the 33rd Guards Mechanised Division. In September 1949 the 33rd Guards Mechanized Division arrived in Timișoara from the Odessa Military District, becoming part of the Special Mechanized Army. The 33rd Guards Mechanized Division was detached to the Special Corps and fought in Operation Whirlwind, the suppression of the Hungarian Revolution of 1956. After the end of the operation, the division became part of the newly reformed Southern Group of Forces. On 4 June 1957, the division became the 33rd Guards Motor Rifle Division. The division was based at Győr with the 38th Army. In 1958 it moved to Kishinev and became part of the 14th Army. The division was disbanded there on 8 October 1960.

== Commanders ==
=== 69th Rifle Division ===
- Colonel Athanasius Dmitrievich Shemenkov (June 1938 – December 1940)

=== 107th Tank Division ===
- Colonel Piotr Nikolaevich Domrachev (18 July 1941 – 30 August 1941)
- Colonel Porfiry Chanchibadze (31 August 1941 – 15 September 1941)

=== 107th Motorized Rifle Division ===
- Colonel Porfiry Chanchibadze (16 September 1941 – 12 January 1942)

=== 2nd Guards Motorized Rifle Division ===
- Colonel Porfiry Chanchibadze (12 January 1942 – 24 October 1942)

=== 49th Guards Rifle Division ===
- Major General Porfiry Chanchibadze (25 October – 14 November 1942)
- Colonel Denis Podshivailov – (15 November 1942 – 11 April 1943; promoted to major general 27 November 1942)
- Colonel Georgy Kolesnikov – (12 April – 14 November 1943)
- Lieutenant Colonel Lev Puzanov (1 December 1943 – 10 January 1944)
- Colonel Vasily Margelov (11 January – 15 May 1944)
- Colonel Stepan Salychev (16 May – 21 June 1944)
- Colonel Vasily Margelov (22 June 1944 – 11 May 1945; promoted to major general 13 September 1944)

== Sources ==
- Drogovoz, Igor (2003). Танковый меч страны Советов [Tank Sword of the Soviet country] (in Russian). Moscow: AST. ISBN 9851311332.
- Feskov, V.I.; Golikov, V.I.; Kalashnikov, K.A.; Slugin, S.A. (2013). Вооруженные силы СССР после Второй Мировой войны: от Красной Армии к Советской [The Armed Forces of the USSR after World War II: From the Red Army to the Soviet: Part 1 Land Forces] (in Russian). Tomsk: Scientific and Technical Literature Publishing. ISBN 9785895035306.
