= 13th Guards Army Corps =

Corps of the Soviet Ground Forces

The 13th Guards Army Corps was a corps of the Soviet Ground Forces, formed from the previous 13th Guards Rifle Corps, which saw service during the Second World War.

== World War II ==
The 13th Guards Rifle Corps was formed from 30 October to 15 November 1942 in Ranenburg, Tambov Oblast, under the command of Major General Porfiry Chanchibadze. The corps received its baptism of fire in December 1942 during the Battle of Stalingrad. It was part of 2nd Guards Army on 1 December 1942. On 1 February 1943, still with 2nd Guards Army, the corps consisted of the 3rd Guards, 49th Guards, and 387th Rifle Divisions. By 1 December 1943, the 295th Rifle Division had joined the corps.

Later the corps helped liberate Novocherkassk, the Donbas, Kherson, Crimea, Belarus and Lithuania. After the Crimean Offensive Chanchibadze moved up to army command, the 3rd Guards Rifle Division Kantemir Tsalikov was selected to be corps commander. From 8 July, the corps fought in the Šiauliai Offensive, in which Tsalikov was killed when his jeep exploded a mine on 21 July. Lieutenant General Anton Lopatin succeeded him as commander and led the corps for the remainder of the war. It took part in the capture of East Prussia and Königsberg. The corps ended the war on the Baltic Sea. 42 awards of Hero of the Soviet Union were made to personnel attached to the corps. During the assault and capture of the walled city of Koenigsberg the name "Konigsberg" was conferred on the corps (1945).

== Postwar ==
On June 12, 1946, 75th Guards Rifle Division was transformed into the 17th Guards Rifle Brigade. The brigade, stationed at Tula, was transferred in the summer of 1946 to 13th Guards Rifle 'Konigsberg' Corps. The brigade was relocated from Tula to Kaluga. In May 1946, the brigade was relocated from the city of Kaluga to the city of Dorogobuzh in the Smolensk area. The headquarters of 13th Guards Rifle Corps was relocated in the summer of 1946 to the city of Moscow.

On 30 April 1955 the 272nd Rifle Division was renumbered the 46th Rifle Division while part of the 13th Guards Rifle Corps. In 1956 the corps headquarters was moved to Gorky. On 25 June 1957, it became the 46th Motor Rifle Division. The same month, the corps became the 13th Guards Army Corps. At the same time it became part of the Moscow Military District, and on 17 November 1964 was renumbered as the 272nd Motor Rifle Division, restoring its World War II designation. In February 1967, the division was relocated to Babstovo, Jewish Autonomous Oblast, as a result of rising tensions with China.

When the 103rd Rocket Brigade was established in 1960, it joined the corps. In 1965, the 43rd Tank Division was renamed the 60th Tank Division. In 1968, the Corps was awarded the Order of the Red Banner. In the corps were:

- 60th Tank Sevsk Warsaw Red Banner Order of Suvorov Division (Gorky). In early 1980, the 285th Tank Regiment (Warsaw, Order of Kutuzov) was transferred to the Turkestan Military District as the Soviet invasion of Afghanistan gained pace. It was replaced by the 142nd Tank Regiment. The division, a Reduced Strength formation, was reorganized as a Weapons and Equipment Storage Base in 1989, and disbanded in February 1990.
- 863rd Artillery Regiment.
- 225th Motor Rifle Division (Mulino, Volodarsky District, Gorky Oblast):
- 1303rd Artillery Regiment.
- 89th Motor Rifle Division (Tambov, Novaya Lyada)

In September 1987, the 225th Motor Rifle Division were disbanded. On 1 October 1987, the 89th Motor Rifle Division was reorganized into the 5347th Base for Storage of Weapons and Equipment (VKhVT). In March 1989, the 60th Tank Division became the 5409th Weapons and Equipment Storage Base, which was then disbanded on 13 February 1990.

In 1990, the corps was under the command of Fyodor Reut. According to the directive of the Ministry of Defense of the USSR, 14 September 1990, 13th Guards Army Red Konigsberg Corps was transformed into the 22nd Guards Combined Arms Army. The Army was formed on March 1, 1991. In 1990, the 31st Tank Vislenskaya Red Banner Order of Suvorov and Kutuzov Division joined the army, relocated from the Central Group of Forces in Czechoslovakia.

In 1994, the 47th Guards Tank Division joined the 22nd Army, relocated from Germany, and which was set up at the Mulino barracks previously used by the 225th MRD.
