= Šiauliai offensive =

Summer 1944 battle on Eastern Front of WW2

- Part of Operation Bagration / Eastern Front
Date	5 July–29 August 1944
Location	Belorussian SSR, Lithuania, and Latvia 56°N 24°E
Result	Soviet victory

Belligerents
Germany	Soviet Union

Commanders and leaders
Georg-Hans Reinhardt (Third Panzer Army); Paul Laux (Sixteenth Army)	Hovhannes Bagramyan (1st Baltic Front)

The Šiauliai offensive (Russian: Шяуляйская операция) was an operation of the Soviet forces of the 1st Baltic Front, commanded by General Hovhannes Bagramyan, conducted from 5 July to 29 August 1944, during the Second World War. It was part of the third phase of the Belorussian strategic offensive operation (also known as Operation Bagration), and drove German troops from much of Lithuania, with the main tactical objective of the city of Šiauliai (Russian: Шяуля́й, German: Schaulen).

== Deployments ==
=== Wehrmacht ===
- Elements of Army Group Centre (Field-Marshal Walter Model)
  - Northern wing of 3rd Panzer Army (Colonel-General Georg-Hans Reinhardt)
    - XXVI Corps (General Gerhard Matzky)
- Elements of Army Group North (Colonel-General Johannes Frießner)
  - Southern wing of 16th Army (General Paul Laux)

=== Red Army ===
- 1st Baltic Front (General Hovhannes Bagramyan)
  - 2nd Guards Army (General-Lieutenant Porfiry Chanchibadze)
  - 6th Guards Army (General-Lieutenant Ivan Chistyakov)
  - 39th Army (General-Lieutenant Ivan Lyudnikov)
  - 43rd Army (General-Lieutenant Afanasy Beloborodov)
  - 51st Army (General-Lieutenant Yakov Kreizer)

== The offensive ==
=== Initial phase ===
In July 1944, The Soviet Operation Bagration had been achieving great success. Army Group Centre was in tatters, and the northern edge of the Soviet assault threatened to trap Army Group North in Latvia and Estonia. Front forces (the 6th Guards and 43rd Armies), participating in the Belorussian strategic offensive operation, advanced to the line of the Druya river, west of Voropaevo and Naroch Lake from 4 July, having the mission of beginning an advance in the direction of Švenčionys, Kaunas and by part of the forces towards Panevėžys and Šiauliai. Also included in the composition of the Front for this operation was the 39th Army, which had to be concentrated on the left wing of the Front by 10 July. The Front was also reinforced by the 2nd Guards and 51st Armies from the Stavka Reserve, though these could only arrive in the front sector by the second half of July. The offensive began on 5 July with an assault by the forces of two rifle corps of the 6th Guards and three rifle corps of 43rd Armies, with support from a reduced 1st Tank Corps.

Facing them were German troops of two corps, which were positioned on adjacent wings of Army Groups North and Centre. Hyazinth Graf Strachwitz's tanks had been sent to the Latvian capital, Riga and had halted the advance of Hovhannes Bagramyan's 1st Baltic Front in late July 1944. Strachwitz's Panzerverband was broken up in late July. From the morning of 10 July the 39th Army was introduced into the battle, conducting an assault towards Kaunas. By 12 July the frontage of the offensive of three armies increased to 200 km, the opposing troops of Army Group North. By early August, the Soviet forces were in position to cut off Army Group North from Army Group Centre.

=== Transfer of main attack from Kaunas to Šiauliai ===
As a result of the offensive's development, Stavka shifted the direction of the main attack of the 1st Baltic Front from Kaunas to Šiauliai. 39th Army, together with the sector of its offensive was transferred to the 3rd Belorussian Front on 14 July (see the Kaunas offensive operation). In exchange, 1st Baltic Front received the 3rd Guards Mechanized Corps.

For the development of the offensive on the Šiauliai axis, the 2nd Guards and 51st Armies were introduced into the battle on 14 July By 22 July their troops had captured Panevežys - an important communications center of Army Group North. On 27 July the 3rd Guards Mechanized Corps, in cooperation with the combined arms units of 51st Army, captured Šiauliai, which had been held by a scratch force led by Hellmuth Mäder. The troops of the right wing of the Front in interaction with the forces of the 2nd Baltic Front took Daugavpils.

Pressing home the attack, the forces of the Front on 30 July overran strong points and road junctions Biržai and Bauska, and by 31 July had reached Jelgava. The Front's mobile detachments entered Tukums and reached the coast of the Gulf of Riga, cutting the land communications of Army Group North.

=== German counter-attacks ===
At the end of July and beginning of August Bagramyan's forces repulsed German counter-attacks in the region of Biržai (some 4 infantry divisions and up to 100 tanks and assault guns, according to Soviet estimates) and Raseiniai (one infantry and one tank division). Panzerverband von Strachwitz was reformed, this time from elements of the 101st Panzer Brigade of Oberst Meinrad von Lauchert and the newly formed SS Panzer Brigade Gross. Inside the pocket, the remaining panzers and StuGs of the Hermann von Salza and the last of Jähde's Tigers were formed into another Kampfgruppe to attack from the inside.

On 19 August, the counter-attack, which had been dubbed Operation Doppelkopf got underway. It was preceded by a bombardment by the cruiser Prinz Eugen's 203 mm guns, which destroyed forty-eight T-34s assembling in the square at Tukums. During these defensive actions, the ground forces were supported by the 3rd Air Army. By 20 August the German forces, by counterattacks in the regions west of Tukums and Sloka and with support from the Kriegsmarine, were able to push the Soviet troops away from the coastline in the southern sector and to restore the sea communications of their formations around Riga. Strachwitz and the SS Division Nordland met on the 21st, and contact was restored between the army groups.

== Aftermath ==
By that point, Army Group North was extremely vulnerable to being cut off. The 1st Baltic Front resumed its offensive that autumn, finally destroying much of Third Panzer Army and severing the connection between the German Army Groups Centre and North, in the Memel offensive operation.
