= 2nd Guards Army =

WW2 Soviet Red Army formation

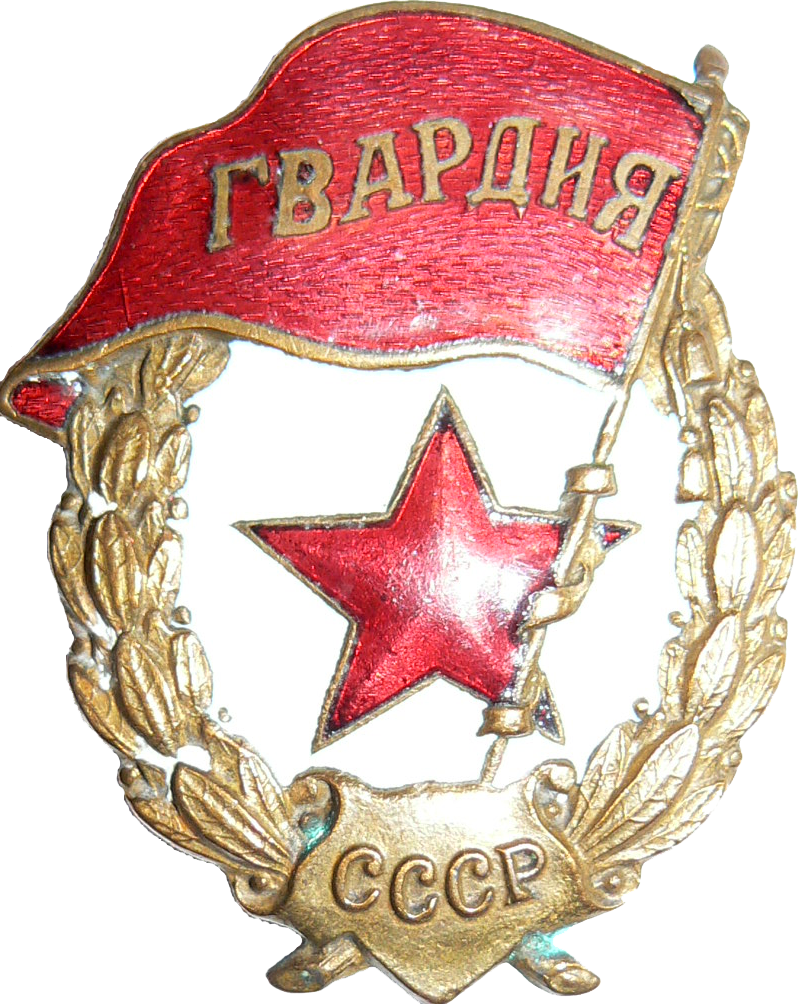
- Active: 1942–1945
- Country: Soviet Union
- Branch: Red Army,
- Size: two or more Rifle Corps
- Engagements: Operation Little Saturn

Commanders
- Notable commanders: Rodion Malinovsky; Georgy Zakharov; Porfiry Chanchibadze

The 2nd Guards Army was a field army of the Soviet Union's Red Army that fought in World War II, most notably at Stalingrad.

== History ==
The 2nd Guards Army was formed according to the order of the Staff of the Supreme High Command (Stavka) from October 23, 1942, on the basis of the 1st Reserve Army. Formation and training took place in Tambov, Michurinsk and Morshansk areas. On 1 November 1942 the Combat composition of the Soviet Army lists 1st Reserve Army with the 1st Guards Rifle Corps – 24th Guards, 33rd Guards and 98th rifle divisions [under Guards General-Major I. I. Missan], and the 13th Guards Rifle Corps with the 49th Guards, 3rd Guards and 387th divisions.

By the time of the Battle of Stalingrad, the 2nd Guards Army had become one of the most powerful units in the Red Army. The 2nd Guards Army appeared on the scene after the Soviet Operation Uranus had successfully encircled the German Sixth Army at Stalingrad in November 1942. In December 1942, as preparations started for Operation Saturn, the 2nd Guards Army was ordered by Joseph Stalin to prepare for an attack on Rostov. The assault and capture of Rostov was the ultimate goal of the Red Army for Operation Saturn.

In December 1942, plans for Operation Saturn had to be altered. The German Operation Wintergewitter, led by Field Marshal Erich von Manstein's Army Group Don, made an attack on the Stalingrad Front in an effort to relieve the Sixth Army in Stalingrad. Thus, Operation Saturn was changed to Operation Little Saturn, which was to be a counter-attack that would be launched as soon as Operation Wintergewitter ended. The German forces, spearheaded by Army Group Hoth, made rapid initial advances but was stalled at the Myshkova River. Colonel-General Hermann Hoth's panzer divisions were at a standstill and were suffering heavy casualties, even before the bulk of the 2nd Guards Army had arrived. By this time, Manstein realized that the operation was a failure. The 2nd Guards Army, under General Rodion Malinovsky, had been transferred to the Stalingrad Front to halt the offensive. Stalin had agreed to this decision.

After Operation Wintergewitter had ended, Soviet forces in the South-West Front led by the First Guards Army successfully launched Operation Little Saturn against the Italian Eighth Army. Following this, the 2nd Guards Army and the 51st Army launched another counter-offensive, this time against Army Group Hoth, in the days before Christmas 1942. Not only had Operation Wintergewitter been halted, the Red Army had made substantial gains against Army Group Hoth, Army Group Don, and also Army Group A in the Caucasus region that month.

Until late 1943, the 2nd Guards Mechanised Corps was operating as part of the army.

The 2nd Guards Army made a very significant contribution to the Soviet halt of Operation Wintergewitter and the successful counter-attacks that followed.

In February 1944, the Army relocated to the area of the Perekop Isthmus. The Crimean Offensive was launched across the Perekop Isthmus on 8 April 1944 by elements of the 2nd Guards Army and 51st Army, under the 4th Ukrainian Front. On 1 May 1944 the army comprised the 13th Guards Rifle Corps (3rd, 24th and 87th Guards Rifle Divisions); 54th Rifle Corps (126th, 315th, and 387th Rifle Divisions); 55th Rifle Corps (33rd Guards, 87th, and 347th Rifle Divisions); and the 78th and 116th Fortified Regions. In cooperation with other troops of the 4th Ukrainian Front and the Black Sea Fleet, Sevastopol was liberated on May 9, 1944. In May and June the 2nd Guards Army was relocated to the area of the cities Dorogobuzh Elnya. On May 20, was moved to the Reserve of the Supreme High Command and on July 8 the unit was a part of the 1st Baltic Front. By that time, it consisted of the 11th and the 13th and 54th Guards Rifle Corps. In this structure, on 5–20 July 1944 took part in the Vilnius Offensive/operation at the end of July, and in the Siauliai offensive reflect enemy counterattacks west and north-west of Siauliai. In October, the 2nd Guards Army participated in the Memel offensive. On December 20 it was reassigned to the 3rd Belorussian Front.

On 1 December 1944 the 2nd Guards Army, part of the 1st Baltic Front, consisted of the 11th Guards Rifle Corps (2nd, 32nd and 33rd Guards Rifle Divisions), 13th Guards Rifle Corps (3rd, 24th, 87th Guards Rifle Divisions and 16th Rifle Division), 1st Rifle Corps (145th, 306th, and 357th Rifle Divisions), artillery (including 21st Artillery Breakthrough Division and 2nd Anti-Aircraft Artillery Division), tank forces, and other formations and units.

During the East Prussian Offensive in January–April 1945, the army broke through long-term German strategic defenses, eliminated in conjunction with other troops surrounded the front of its group (south-west of Königsberg and Samland group).

== Post War ==
After the war ended, 2nd Guards Army, numbering six rifle divisions in two corps, was withdrawn to the Moscow Military District where it was disbanded in September 1945.

== Commanders ==
- Major General (from February 1943 – Lieutenant General) Yakov Kreizer (October–November 1942 and February–July 1943)
- Lieutenant General Rodion Malinovsky (November 1942 – February 1943)
- Lieutenant General Georgy Zakharov (July 1943 – June 1944)
- Lieutenant General Porfiry Chanchibadze (June 1944 – until the end of the war)
