= Samland offensive =

WWII Soviet offensive on the Eastern Front

- Part of Eastern Front of World War II
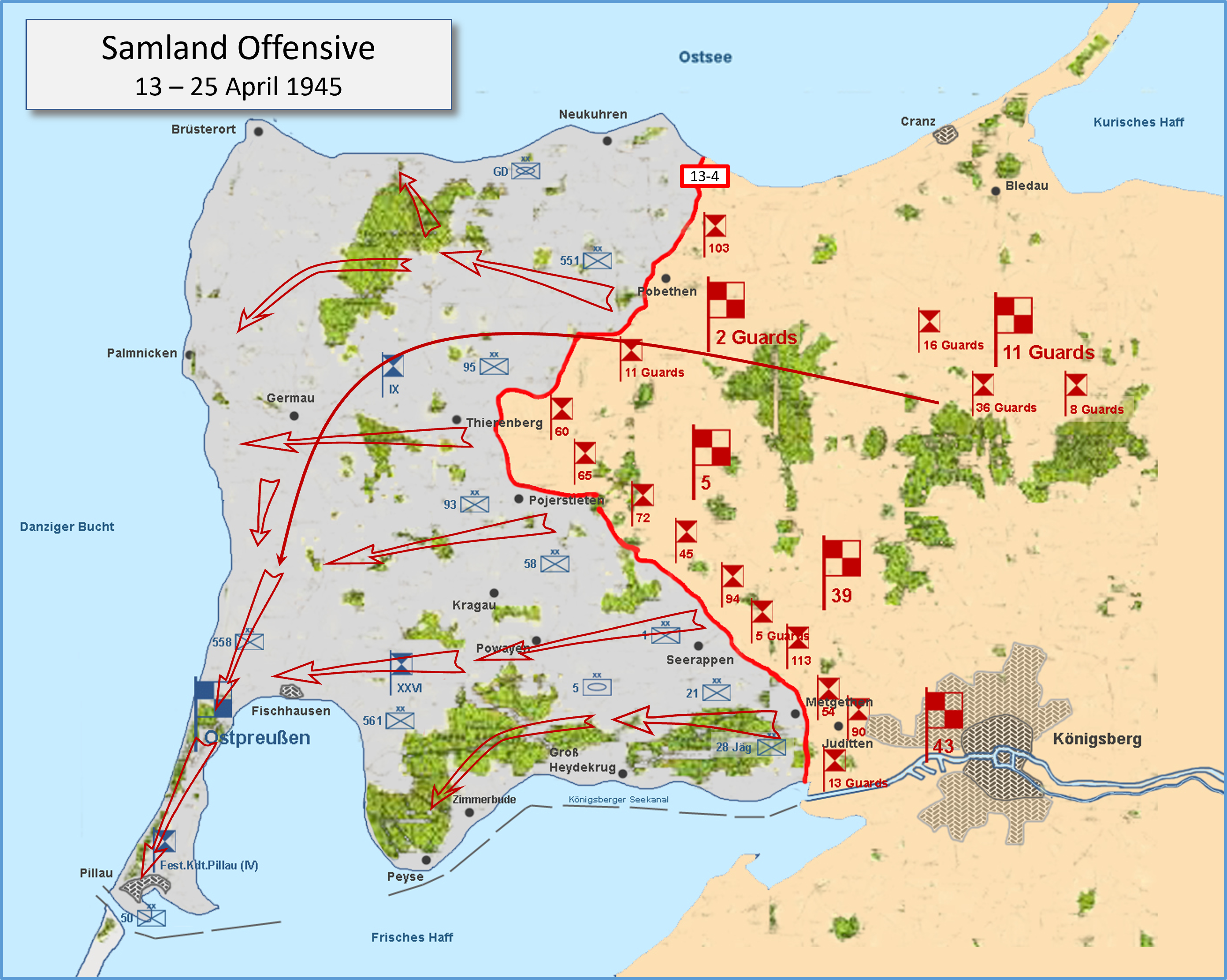
- Map of the offensive
Date	April 13 – April 25, 1945
Location	Sambia, East Prussia (now Kaliningrad Oblast)
Result	Soviet Victory

Belligerents
Germany	Soviet Union

Commanders and leaders
Hans Gollnick; Dietrich von Saucken	Hovhannes Bagramyan

Units involved
Army Detachment Samland; Armee Ostpreußen	Zemland Group of Forces

Casualties and losses
Soviet claim: 80,000 KIA or POW	Unknown

The Samland offensive was a Soviet offensive on the Eastern Front in the final stages of World War II. It took place in Sambia (German: Samland); (Russian: земланд, romanized: Zemland).

The East Prussian offensive, which commenced on January 13, 1945, had seen the Red Army clear German forces from much of East Prussia. The defenders had been driven into a series of pockets on the Baltic coast and in the city of Königsberg, in which they were besieged.

Marshal Aleksandr Vasilevsky, who had taken over command of the 3rd Belorussian Front in February, incorporated General Hovhannes Bagramyan's 1st Baltic Front into his command from February 22, redesignating it as the Zemland Army Group (or Samland Front). Bagramyan's forces initially laid siege to Königsberg; the city was eventually stormed on April 9. They were then given the task of overcoming the substantial German force still remaining in Sambia.

== German planning ==
German defence efforts had largely focused on the port of Pillau at the tip of the peninsula, which was the main evacuation point for casualties and East Prussian civilians. Throughout the Battle of Königsberg, Sambia had been defended by Army Detachment Samland under the command of General Hans Gollnick, who had tried to maintain a corridor between Königsberg and Pillau.

On April 7, the remnants of Second and Fourth Armies, which had been destroyed in encirclements at Danzig and Heiligenbeil respectively, were combined as Armee Ostpreußen with the task of defending Sambia, the Vistula delta and the Hel Peninsula; Gollnick's troops were incorporated in it.

Most of the units of Armee Ostpreußen were little more than remnants, and the entire formation was very poorly supplied. During the battle for Sambia, its officers were outraged to discover that the Luftwaffe and Kriegsmarine had maintained large underground depots full of stores and fuel in the woods of the peninsula; the supplies had to be destroyed in the retreat.

== Deployments ==
=== Red Army ===
- Samland Army Group (General Hovhannes Bagramyan)
  - 2nd Guards Army (Lieutenant-General Porfiry Chanchibadze)
  - 11th Guards Army (General Kuzma Galitsky)
  - 5th Army (Colonel-General Nikolay Krylov)
  - 49th Army (Lieutenant-General Ivan Grishin)
  - 43rd Army (General Afanasy Beloborodov)

=== Wehrmacht ===
- Elements of Armee Ostpreußen (General Dietrich von Saucken)
  - XXVI Corps (General Gerhard Matzky) (remnants of 58th, 1st, and 21st Infantry Divisions, 5th Panzer Division, 28th Jäger Division, and 561st Volksgrenadier Division)
  - LV Corps / 'Fortress Pillau' (Lieutenant-General Kurt Chill) (remnants of 50th and 286th Infantry Divisions and 558th Volksgrenadier Division)
  - IX Corps (General Rolf Wuthmann to April 20, then Lieutenant-General Hermann Hohn) (remnants of 95th, 93rd, and 14th Infantry Divisions, 551st Volksgrenadier Division and Panzergrenadier Division Großdeutschland)
  - Elements of Heavy Panzer Battalion 511 and Heavy Panzer Battalion 505

== The offensive ==
The offensive plan called for the 5th and 39th Armies to break through towards Fischhausen as the main strike force, with the 11th Guards Army in reserve. The 2nd Guards Army would attack in the north, with the 43rd Army breaking through on the southern flank. There would also be amphibious landings in the south of Sambia. The 3rd Belorussian Front's head of intelligence suggested that they faced up to 100,000 defending troops but by shortening the frontage of each unit the attackers were able to achieve a superiority of two to one in men and three to one in artillery. Bagramyan issued a call for the defenders to surrender in exchange for fair treatment and medical assistance for the wounded, but this went unanswered, and the offensive commenced with an artillery barrage and air attacks on April 13.

The initial attack scattered many of the remaining German forces, some falling back towards Pillau. The Soviet 115th Rifle Division broke through and cleared the 551st Volksgrenadier Division from Rauschen on the north-western tip of Sambia; the German forces in the north of the peninsula, including the 95th Infantry Division and parts of Heavy Panzer Battalion 511, were driven southwards into Palmnicken and destroyed.

By April 16, Soviet forces broke through near Fischhausen; parts of XXVI Corps, including the 5th Panzer and 28th Jäger Divisions became cut off on the peninsula at Peyse, and were lost. A defence line, the Tenkitten-Riegel, had been improvised across the narrow strip of land leading to Pillau; to break German resistance, the 11th Guards Army was committed on April 20. Fighting intensified at Tenkitten, where the commander of the 16th Guards Rifle Corps, Major-General S S Gur'ev, was killed by a shell fragment on April 22.

The German defensive perimeter was pushed back towards Pillau, which was defended by elements of the 1st, 21st, 58th and other Infantry Divisions; the remaining German troops were evacuated to the Frische Nehrung. Pillau had been heavily fortified, being described by Bagramyan as "Konigsberg in miniature", and was supported by fire from naval artillery and coastal batteries. After a stubborn defence, it was eventually stormed by units of the 11th Guards Army, including the 31st Guards Rifle Division, on April 25, the town being cleared in around 12 hours. The last German position to fall was a battery commanded by Major-General Karl Henke, which was overrun by the 16th Guards Rifle Corps on April 27.

== Aftermath ==
The Red Army claimed to have killed or taken prisoner 80,000 German troops during the operations in Sambia.

The remnants of IX Corps resisted on the Frische Nehrung to the end of the war, though the corps staff was removed to Bornholm.

The headquarters of the Zemland Group of Forces later became the headquarters of the Baltic Military District on 9 July 1945.
