= List of Knight's Cross of the Iron Cross recipients (V) =

The Knight's Cross of the Iron Cross (German: Ritterkreuz des Eisernen Kreuzes) and its variants were the highest awards in the military and paramilitary forces of Nazi Germany during World War II. The Knight's Cross of the Iron Cross was awarded for a wide range of reasons and across all ranks, from a senior commander for skilled leadership of his troops in battle to a low-ranking soldier for a single act of extreme gallantry. A total of 7,321 awards were made between its first presentation on 30 September 1939 and its last bestowal on 17 June 1945. (Note: Großadmiral and President of Germany Karl Dönitz, Hitler's successor as Head of State (Staatsoberhaupt) and Supreme Commander of the Armed Forces, had ordered the cessation of all promotions and awards as of 11 May 1945 (Dönitz-decree). Consequently the last Knight's Cross awarded to Oberleutnant zur See of the Reserves Georg-Wolfgang Feller on 17 June 1945 must therefore be considered a de facto but not de jure hand-out.) This number is based on the analysis and acceptance of the order commission of the Association of Knight's Cross Recipients (AKCR). Presentations were made to members of the three military branches of the Wehrmacht—the Heer (Army), Kriegsmarine (Navy) and Luftwaffe (Air Force)—as well as the Waffen-SS, the Reichsarbeitsdienst (RAD—Reich Labour Service) and the Volkssturm (German national militia). There were also 43 recipients in the military forces of allies of the Third Reich.

These recipients are listed in the 1986 edition of Walther-Peer Fellgiebel's book, Die Träger des Ritterkreuzes des Eisernen Kreuzes 1939–1945 [The Bearers of the Knight's Cross of the Iron Cross 1939–1945]. Fellgiebel was the former chairman and head of the order commission of the AKCR. In 1996, the second edition of this book was published with an addendum delisting 11 of these original recipients. Author Veit Scherzer has cast doubt on a further 193 of these listings. The majority of the disputed recipients had been nominated for the award in 1945, when the deteriorating situation of Germany during the final days of World War II left a number of nominations incomplete and pending in various stages of the approval process.

Listed here are the 92 Knight's Cross recipients whose last name starts with "V". Scherzer has challenged the validity of five of these listings. The recipients are ordered alphabetically by last name. The rank listed is the recipient's rank at the time the Knight's Cross was awarded.

== Background ==
The Knight's Cross of the Iron Cross and its higher grades were based on four separate enactments. The first enactment, Reichsgesetzblatt I S. 1573 of 1 September 1939 instituted the Iron Cross (Eisernes Kreuz), the Knight's Cross of the Iron Cross and the Grand Cross of the Iron Cross (Großkreuz des Eisernen Kreuzes). Article 2 of the enactment mandated that the award of a higher class be preceded by the award of all preceding classes. As the war progressed, some of the recipients of the Knight's Cross distinguished themselves further and a higher grade, the Knight's Cross of the Iron Cross with Oak Leaves (Ritterkreuz des Eisernen Kreuzes mit Eichenlaub), was instituted. The Oak Leaves, as they were commonly referred to, were based on the enactment Reichsgesetzblatt I S. 849 of 3 June 1940. In 1941, two higher grades of the Knight's Cross were instituted. The enactment Reichsgesetzblatt I S. 613 of 28 September 1941 introduced the Knight's Cross of the Iron Cross with Oak Leaves and Swords (Ritterkreuz des Eisernen Kreuzes mit Eichenlaub und Schwertern) and the Knight's Cross of the Iron Cross with Oak Leaves, Swords and Diamonds (Ritterkreuz des Eisernen Kreuzes mit Eichenlaub, Schwertern und Brillanten). At the end of 1944 the final grade, the Knight's Cross of the Iron Cross with Golden Oak Leaves, Swords, and Diamonds (Ritterkreuz des Eisernen Kreuzes mit goldenem Eichenlaub, Schwertern und Brillanten), based on the enactment Reichsgesetzblatt 1945 I S. 11 of 29 December 1944, became the final variant of the Knight's Cross authorized.

== Recipients ==
Knight's Cross of the Iron Cross (V)
Service	Number of presentations	Posthumous presentations
Heer	68	5
Kriegsmarine	1	0
Luftwaffe	17	1
Waffen-SS	6	1

The Oberkommando der Wehrmacht (Supreme Command of the Armed Forces) kept separate Knight's Cross lists for the Heer (Army), Kriegsmarine (Navy), Luftwaffe (Air Force) and Waffen-SS. Within each of these lists a unique sequential number was assigned to each recipient. The same numbering paradigm was applied to the higher grades of the Knight's Cross, one list per grade. Of the 92 awards made to servicemen whose last name starts with "V", seven were later awarded the Knight's Cross of the Iron Cross with Oak Leaves and seven presentations were made posthumously. Heer members received 68 of the medals, one went to the Kriegsmarine, 17 to the Luftwaffe, and six to the Waffen-SS.

This along with the + (plus) indicates that a higher grade of Knight's Cross was awarded as well.
This along with the * (asterisk) indicates that the Knight's Cross was awarded posthumously.
This along with the ? (question mark) indicates that author Veit Scherzer has expressed doubt regarding the veracity and formal correctness of the listing.

Name	Service	Rank	Role and unit (Note: For an explanation of the various naming schemes used by the Luftwaffe, Heer, Kriegsmarine and Waffen-SS refer to nomenclature used by the Wehrmacht and Waffen-SS.)	Date of award	Notes	Image
Gustav von Värst	Heer	Oberst	Commander of the 2. Schützen-Brigade	30 July 1940	—	
Herbert-Ernst Vahl	Waffen-SS	SS-Oberführer	Leader of 2. SS-Panzergrenadier-Division "Das Reich"	31 March 1943	—	—
Hans-Joachim Valet	Luftwaffe	Leutnant	Pilot in the 3./Transportgeschwader 2	20 April 1944	—	—
Hermann Valle	Heer	Oberleutnant of the Reserves	Chief of the 4./Schützen-Regiment 112	31 December 1941	—	—
Helmuth Valtiner	Heer	Gefreiter	Reconnaissance troop leader in the 1./Gebirgsjäger-Regiment 143	13 June 1941	—	—
Anton Vandieken	Waffen-SS	SS-Hauptsturmführer of the Reserves	Leader of a Kampfgruppe in SS-Kavallerie-Regiment 15 (Note: According to Scherzer as chief of the 6./SS-Kavallerie-Regiment 15 and leader of a Kampfgruppe.)	26 December 1944	—	—
Eugène Vaulot	Waffen-SS	Waffen-Unterscharführer	Group leader in the 33. SS-Freiwilligen-Division "Charlemagne" (franz. Nr. 1) in the combat area Groß Berlin (greater Berlin)	29 April 1945	—	—
Bernhard Vechtel	Luftwaffe	Fahnenjunker-Oberfeldwebel	Pilot in the 10./Jagdgeschwader 51 "Mölders"	27 July 1944	—	—
Peter Veeser	Heer	Oberfeldwebel	Shock troops leader in the 7./Infanterie-Regiment 125	14 May 1941	—	—
Fritz Vehse	Heer	Gefreiter	Deputy group leader in the 3./Pionier-Bataillon 342	4 October 1944	—	—
Rudolf Veiel	Heer	Generalleutnant	Commander of the 2. Panzer-Division	3 June 1940	—	
Voldemārs Veiss	Waffen-SS	Waffen-Standartenführer	Commander of lett. SS-Freiwilligen-Grenadier-Regiment 48 (Note: According to Scherzer as commander of SS-Freiwilligen-Grenadier-Regiment 42 (lett. Nr. 4).)	9 February 1944	—	
Alfred Veith	Luftwaffe	Oberleutnant	Observer in the 5./Kampfgeschwader 55	24 October 1944	—	—
Johann Veith	Waffen-SS	SS-Obersturmführer	Leader of the 3./SS-Panzer-Regiment 2 "Das Reich"	14 February 1945*	Killed in action 7 January 1945	—
Martin Veldkamp	Heer	Unteroffizier	Group leader in the 6./Grenadier-Regiment 76 (motorized)	28 November 1943	—	—
Paul Velke	Heer	Oberstleutnant	Commander of Pionier-Bataillon 45	15 August 1940	—	—
Otto Velten	Heer	Feldwebel	Leader of Infanterie-Pionier-Zug/Grenadier-Regiment 436	5 April 1945	—	—
Theodor Velten	Heer	Leutnant	Leader of the 3./Panzer-Aufklärungs-Abteilung 14	4 October 1944	—	—
Siegfried Verhein	Heer	Generalmajor	Leader of Kampfgruppe 551. Volksgrenadier-Division	28 February 1945	—	—
Josef Vernhold	Heer	Unteroffizier	In the 8./Infanterie-Regiment 60 (motorized)	22 February 1942	—	—
Kurt Versock	Heer	Oberst	Commander of Infanterie-Regiment 31	25 August 1942	—	
Dr.-agrar. Hans Vesenmayer	Luftwaffe	Oberleutnant	Chief of the 2./leichte Flak-Abteilung 77 (self-motorized) (Note: According to Scherzer as chief of the 2./leichte Flak-Abteilung 77 (Selbstfahrlafette).)	18 November 1944	—	—
Kurt Veth	Luftwaffe	Hauptmann (Note: According to Scherzer as Hauptmann of the Reserves.)	Commander of the II./Fallschirmjäger-Regiment 3	30 September 1944	—	—
Alfred Vetter	Kriegsmarine	Leutnant	Group leader in the Marine-Kleinkampfmittel-Flottille 211	12 August 1944	Along with Iron Cross (1939) 2nd and 1st Class	—
Johann Vetter	Heer	Gefreiter	PaK gunner in the 14.(Panzerjäger)/Grenadier-Regiment 147 (Note: According to Scherzer as gunner in the 14./Grenadier-Regiment 147.)	15 June 1944*	Killed on active service 4 June 1944	—
Martin Vetter	Luftwaffe	Major	Gruppenkommandeur of the II./Kampfgeschwader 26	16 May 1940	—	—
Max Vetter	Heer	Unteroffizier	Zugführer (platoon leader) in the 1./Grenadier-Regiment 380	7 February 1944	—	—
Alexander Vial	Heer	Oberst	Commander of Grenadier-Regiment 60 (motorized)	18 December 1942	—	—
Hermann Vicinius	Heer	Hauptmann of the Reserves	Commander of the I./Grenadier-Regiment 866	16 September 1943	—	—
Willi Vickendey	Heer	Obergefreiter	Group leader of the 7./Skijäger-Regiment 1	17 September 1944	—	—
Hans Viebig	Heer	Oberst	Commander of Grenadier-Regiment 258	21 February 1944	—	—
Korbinian Viechter	Heer	Leutnant of the Reserves	Leader of the 4./Grenadier-Regiment 42	20 October 1944	—	—
Helmut Viedebantt	Luftwaffe	Oberleutnant	Staffelkapitän in the II./Zerstörergeschwader 1	30 December 1942	—	
Wilhelm Viehmann	Heer	Oberstleutnant	Commander of Grenadier-Regiment 453	17 April 1945	—	—
Gottfried Viehweg	Heer	Oberleutnant of the Reserves	Chief of the 3./Grenadier-Regiment 456	13 January 1944	—	—
Ernst Vielhauer	Heer	Major (Note: According to Scherzer as Major of the Reserves.)	Commander of the II./Grenadier-Regiment 461	21 May 1943	—	—
Wilhelm-August Vielwerth	Heer	Oberfeldwebel	Zugführer (platoon leader) in the 1./Infanterie-Regiment 87 (motorized)	18 October 1941	—	—
Fritz Vierecker? (Note: No evidence of the award can be found in the German Federal Archives. Fellgiebel assumes a presentation via the chief of the Heerespersonalamt (HPA—Army Staff Office) Wilhelm Burgdorf in Berlin. This scenario is very unlikely since the commanding Oder corps, and most likely also Fritz Vierecker's emergency unit, had both been deployed south of Stettin under the command of the Army Group Vistula. His nomination should therefore have been submitted via the command chain of the Army Group Vistula. Additionally the radio connection to the Führerbunker was down since 5:00 on 28 April 1945. Vierecker is not mentioned anywhere in the proceedings of the Order Commission of the Association of Knight's Cross Recipients (AKCR). His family holds a portrait picture of Vierecker wearing the Knight's Cross of the Iron Cross. The Knight's Cross at his neck evidently is not a photomontage. Noteworthy is the fact that Vierecker wears his peace time uniform of Pionier-Battalion 12 (12th pioneer battalion) on this picture.)	Heer	Hauptmann	Leader of an alarm unit at the Oder sector	28 April 1945	—	—
Erwin Vierow	Heer	General der Infanterie	Commanding general of the LV. Armeekorps	15 November 1941	—	
Willi Viertel	Luftwaffe	Oberleutnant	Staffelkapitän of the 7./Sturzkampfgeschwader 1	5 February 1944*	Killed in action 31 August 1943	—
Heinrich von Vietinghoff+ called von Scheel	Heer	General der Panzertruppe	Commanding general of the XIII. Armeekorps	24 June 1940	Awarded 456th Oak Leaves 16 April 1944	
Günther Viezenz	Heer	Oberleutnant	Chief of the 10./Grenadier-Regiment 7	7 January 1944	—	—
Heinrich Villinger	Heer	Leutnant (Note: According to Scherzer as Leutnant of the Reserves.)	Leader of the 6./Gebirgsjäger-Regiment 99	1 February 1945*	Killed in action 12 December 1944	—
Otto Vincon+	Heer	Hauptmann of the Reserves	Deputy leader of the I./Grenadier-Regiment 460 (Note: According to Scherzer as leader of I./Grenadier-Regiment 460.)	3 December 1943	Awarded 728th Oak Leaves 5 February 1945	—
Heinz Vinke+	Luftwaffe	Feldwebel	Pilot in the 11./Nachtjagdgeschwader 1	19 September 1943	Awarded 465th Oak Leaves 25 April 1944	Smiling man wearing life jacket and a military decoration in shape of an Iron Cross at his neck.
Gerhard Virkus	Heer	Oberfeldwebel	Company troop leader in the 2./Panzergrenadier-Regiment 25	7 September 1943	—	—
Kurt Vischer	Heer	Obergefreiter	Group leader in the 6./Jäger-Regiment 40 (L)	18 December 1944	—	—
Viktor Vitali? (Note: No evidence of the award can be found in the German Federal Archives. The award was unlawfully presented by the commanding general of the I. Falschirmkorps, General der Fallschirmtruppe Richard Heidrich.)	Luftwaffe	Leutnant	Zugführer (platoon leader) in the 5./Fallschirmjäger-Regiment 4	30 April 1945	—	—
Helmut Vocke	Heer	Hauptmann	Commander of the II./Panzergrenadier-Regiment 40	26 March 1943	—	—
Georg Vögerl	Luftwaffe	Leutnant	In Fallschirmjäger-Regiment 26	28 March 1945	—	—
Helmut Vögtle? (Note: No evidence of the award can be found in the German Federal Archives. According to Fellgiebel presented on 1 June 1945 by the AOK 6, which was not authorized. Helmut Vögtle is member of the Association of Knight's Cross Recipients.)	Heer	Hauptmann of the Reserves	Commander of the II./Gebirgsjäger-Regiment 99	1 June 1945	—	—
Paul Völckers	Heer	Generalleutnant	Commander of the 78. Infanterie-Division	11 December 1942	—	—
Hermann Völk	Heer	Hauptmann	Commander of Panzer-Jäger-Abteilung 92	26 March 1944	—	—
Helmut Völkel	Heer	Feldwebel	Zugführer (platoon leader) of the 6./Gebirgsjäger-Regiment 91	13 November 1942*	Died of wounds 26 October 1942	—
Dr.-jur. Gerhard Völker	Heer	Oberleutnant of the Reserves	Leader of the II./Panzergrenadier-Regiment 25	26 November 1944	—	—
Emil Vogel+	Heer	Generalleutnant	Commander of the 101. Jäger-Division	7 August 1943	Awarded 475th Oak Leaves 14 May 1944	—
Robert Vogel	Heer	Feldwebel	Zugführer (platoon leader) in the 7./Grenadier-Regiment 119 (motorized)	26 August 1943	—	—
Walter Vogel	Heer	Major	Commander of the I./Grenadier-Regiment 6	29 August 1943 (Note: According to Scherzer on 27 August 1943.)	—	—
Friedrich Vogelsang	Heer	Oberfeldwebel	Zugführer (platoon leader) in the 12./Infanerie-Regiment 78	4 September 1942	—	—
Dr. med. dent. Friedrich Vogelsang	Heer	Oberstleutnant	Commander of Grenadier-Regiment 505	14 December 1943	—	—
Karl Vogelsang	Heer	Major of the Reserves	Commander of the II./Artillerie-Regiment 157	14 January 1945	—	—
Emil Vogler	Heer	Unteroffizier	Kradmeldestaffel (motorcycle halftrack messenger squadron) in the Stab I./Panzergrenadier-Regiment 93	24 January 1944	—	—
Adolf Vogt	Heer	Oberleutnant	Chief of the 12./Grenadier-Regiment 1054	16 October 1944	—	—
Emil Vogt	Heer	Oberschirrmeister	In the Stabskompanie/Panzergrenadier-Regiment 101	26 March 1943	—	—
Fritz Vogt+	Waffen-SS	SS-Obersturmführer	Zugführer (platoon leader) in the 2./SS-Aufklärungs-Abteilung of the SS-Verfügungs-Division	4 September 1940	Awarded 785th Oak Leaves 16 March 1945	—
Heinz-Gerhard Vogt	Luftwaffe	Leutnant	Staffelführer of the 5./Jagdgeschwader 26 "Schlageter"	25 November 1944	—	—
Ludwig Vogt	Heer	Leutnant of the Reserves	Leader of the 4.(MG)/Grenadier-Regiment 915 (Note: According to Scherzer as leader of the 4./Grenadier-Regiment 915.)	17 February 1945	—	—
Hans Vohburger	Heer	Oberleutnant	Chief of the 7./Infanterie-Regiment 19 "List"	14 December 1941	—	—
Gerhard Voigt	Heer	Oberleutnant	Chief of the 2./Pionier-Bataillon 18	25 June 1940	—	—
Hans Voigt? (Note: No evidence of the award can be found in the German Federal Archives. The Order Commission of the Association of Knight's Cross Recipients (AKCR) stated: "...Generalmajor Hans Voigt has to be considered a bearer of the Knight's Cross of the Iron Cross, even though the formalities are not 100 percent correct." because the presentation was an "authorized presentation by Himmler" as commander-in-chief of Army Group Vistula from the end of February or early March. Himmler was not authorized to make this presentation, a fact known to the AKCR, however the AKCR wanted to affiliate Voigt immediately. The AKCR therefore assigned the unsuspicious presentation date of 28 April 1945 and claimed its approval was made by the chief of the Heerespersonalamt (HPA—Army Staff Office) Wilhelm Burgdorf in Berlin. His listing by Fellgiebel contains a footnote stating "It has to be assumed that a few presentations have been made by the chief of the HPA General Burgdorf in the timeframe 20 April to 30 April." Voigt was a member of the AKCR.)	Heer	Generalmajor	Commander of fortress Arnswalde (Pommern)	28 April 1945	—	—
Hans-Günther Voigt	Heer	Oberleutnant	Chief of the 5./Grenadier-Regiment 154	29 February 1944*	Killed in action 12 January 1944	—
Walter Voigt	Heer	Oberfeldwebel	Zugführer (platoon leader) in the 14.(Panzerjäger)/Grenadier-Regiment 31 (Note: According to Scherzer as Zugführer (platoon leader) in the 14./Grenadier-Regiment 31.)	16 October 1944	—	—
Heinrich Voigtsberger+	Heer	Major	Commander of MG-Bataillon 2	9 July 1941	Awarded 351st Oak Leaves 9 December 1943	—
Friedrich-Jobst Volckamer von Kirchensittenbach	Heer	Generalleutnant	Commander of the 8. Jäger-Division	26 March 1944	—	—
Hennecke Volckens	Heer	Hauptmann	Chief of the 7./Panzer-Regiment 6	17 December 1942*	Died of wounds 16 December 1942	—
Kurt Volk	Heer	Unteroffizier	Gun leader in the 2./Panzer-Jäger-Abteilung 9	10 May 1943	—	—
Herbert Volke	Heer	Oberwachtmeister	Zugführer (platoon leader) in the 1./Panzer-Aufklärungs-Abteilung 5 (Note: According to Scherzer as Zugführer (platoon leader) in the 1./Aufklärungs-Abteilung 5.)	16 November 1944	—	—
Heinrich Volker	Heer	Hauptmann	Chief of the Stabskompanie/Panzergrenadier-Regiment 73	19 January 1943	—	—
Heinz Volkmann	Heer	Leutnant of the Reserves	Battery officer in the 2./Artillerie-Regiment 240	8 February 1943	—	—
Friedrich Vollbracht	Luftwaffe	Oberstleutnant	Geschwaderkommodore of Zerstörergeschwader 2	13 October 1940	—	—
Götzpeter Vollmer	Luftwaffe	Oberleutnant	Staffelkapitän of the 1./Sturzkampfgeschwader 2 "Immelmann"	22 June 1941 (Note: According to Scherzer on 24 June 1941.)	—	—
Günter Vollmer	Heer	Oberleutnant of the Reserves	Leader of the 3./Grenadier-Regiment 411	20 April 1943	—	—
Heinrich Vonhoff	Heer	Oberleutnant of the Reserves	Chief of the 12./Infanterie-Regiment 408	25 September 1942	—	—
Klaus Voormann	Heer	Oberleutnant	Chief of the 10./Infanterie-Regiment 134	10 September 1942	—	—
Oskar Vorbrugg	Luftwaffe	Oberst	Commander of Flak-Regiment 21 (motorized) (Note: According to Scherzer on 9 June 1944 as commander of Flak-Regiment 21.)	3 June 1944	—	—
Nikolaus von Vormann	Heer	Generalleutnant	Commander of the 23. Panzer-Division	22 August 1943	—	—
Werner Voshage? (Note: No evidence of the award can be found in the German Federal Archives. Werner Voshage is also not mentioned in the activity reports of the Association of Knight's Cross Recipients (AKCR). The only indication can be found in a letter of the AKCR to Friedrich Müller-Rochholz dated from 16 June 1980 which claims that Voshage may have been nominated in mid-March. According to the AKCR the award was presented in accordance with the Dönitz-decree. This is illegal according to the Deutsche Dienststelle (WASt) and lacks legal justification. The presentation date is an assumption of the AKCR.)	Heer	Major	Commander of Heeres-Flak-Abteilung "Brandenburg"	8 May 1945	—	—
Ernst Voß+	Heer	Oberstleutnant	Commander of Grenadier-Regiment 585	18 April 1943	Awarded 314th Oak Leaves 28 October 1943	—
Herbert Voß	Luftwaffe	Major	Gruppenkommandeur of the II./Kampfgeschwader 51	5 February 1944	—	—
Johann-Joachim Voß	Heer	Oberleutnant of the Reserves	Leader of the 5./Schützen-Regiment 93	27 May 1942	—	—
Reimer Voß	Luftwaffe	Oberleutnant	Staffelkapitän of the 4./Kampfgeschwader 26	12 March 1945	—	—
Heinrich Voutta	Heer	Hauptmann	Leader of Panzer-Aufklärungs-Abteilung 9	23 March 1945	—	—
