= Friedrich Rudolf von Rothenburg =

German nobleman and soldier

Friedrich Rudolf von Rothenburg (9 September 1710 Schloss Nietków – 29 December 1751 in Berlin) was a lieutenant general, lord of Rothenburg an der Oder, and a knight of the Order of the Black Eagle.

== Family ==
Friedrich Rudolf von Rothenburg stemmed from an old Silesian family. His parents were Alexander Rudolf von Rothenburg (d. 20 May 1758), lord of Rothenburg an der Oder, und his wife, Eva Sophie von Falkenhayn. He was born in Schloss "Nettkowe" (Nietków). His father was raised to the nobility on 14 April 1736. In 1735 he was married to the daughter of the French lieutenant general Bieuville. The couple had a son who died shortly after his birth in 1736.

He was instructed at home and sent to the University in Frankfurt an der Oder with his brothers. In 1725, he went for further instruction to the Prussian instructor Senning at the University in Luneville. Soon he was back in Berlin, so he could continue under the instruction of Major Gerar. There he wanted to join the French Royal German regiment commanded by Johann Christian Rulemann von Quadt, but his father would not give his permission. So he went back to Germany with his brother. At the beginning of 1727, he was a captain in the Regiment Rosen.

In 1731, he joined his French cousin Konrad Alexander von Rothenburg in Spain. In 1732, he went as a volunteer into Spanish service. He later campaigned in Africa. On 30 June 1732, he was at the Battle of Oran. Following this, he returned to Spain. In 1733 he was again with his regiment in Alsace and was appointed adjutant of General Berwick. He participated in the Siege of Kehl. After the death of the general at Philippsburg, he served as the general adjutant to Marshal d'Asfeld. At the end of the Rhine campaign in 1734, he was promoted to colonel.
