= Friedrich Schulz =

German general

- Born: 15 October 1897; Nettkow, Province of Silesia, Kingdom of Prussia, German Empire
- Died: 30 November 1976 (aged 79); Freudenstadt, Baden-Württemberg, West Germany
- Military career
- Allegiance: German Empire; Weimar Republic; Nazi Germany
- Branch: German Army
- Service years: 1914–1945
- Rank: General der Infanterie
- Commands: III Army Corps; 17th Army; Army Group South
- Conflicts: World War I World War II: operation Grapeshot
- Awards: Knight's Cross of the Iron Cross with Oak Leaves and Swords

Karl Friedrich "Fritz" Wilhelm Schulz (15 October 1897 – 30 November 1976) was a German general during World War II. He was a recipient of the Knight's Cross of the Iron Cross with Oak Leaves and Swords of Nazi Germany.

== Awards and decorations ==
- Iron Cross (1914), 2nd and 1st Class
  - 2nd Class (2 June 1916)
  - 1st Class (27 January 1918)
- Wound Badge (1918) in Black
- The Honour Cross of the World War 1914/1918 with Swords
- Wehrmacht Long Service Award, 4th to 1st Class
- 1939 Clasp to the Iron Cross of 1914, 2nd and 1st Class
  - 2nd Class (6 April 1940)
  - 1st Class (14 June 1940)
- Eastern Medal
- Crimea Shield
- Order of Michael the Brave, III. Class on 6 October 1942
- Mentioned in the Wehrmachtbericht on 14 March 1944
- Knight's Cross of the Iron Cross with Oak Leaves and Swords
  - Knight's Cross on 29 March 1942 as Oberst im Generalstab and chief of the general staff of the XXXXIII. Armee-Korps
  - 428th Oak Leaves on 20 March 1944 as Generalleutnant and acting commander of the III. Panzer-Korps
  - 135th Swords on 26 February 1945 as General der Infanterie and commander in chief of the 17. Armee

Military offices
Preceded by General der Artillerie Johann Sinnhuber	Commander of 28. Jäger Division; 1 May 1943 – 25 November 1943	Succeeded by Generalmajor Hubertus Lamey
Preceded by General der Artillerie Heinz Ziegler	Commander of III. Armeekorps; 25 November 1943 – 9 January 1944	Succeeded by General der Panzertruppe Hermann Breith
Preceded by General der Infanterie Kurt von der Chevallerie	Commander of LIX. Armeekorps; 8 February 1944 – 22 March 1944	Succeeded by General der Infanterie Edgar Röhricht
Preceded by General der Infanterie Hans Gollnick	Commander of XXXXVI Panzer Corps; 22 March 1944 – 3 July 1944	Succeeded by Generalleutnant Fritz Becker
Preceded by General der Infanterie Karl Allmendinger	Commander of 17. Armee; 26 July 1944 – 30 March 1945	Succeeded by General der Infanterie Wilhelm Hasse
Preceded by General Paul Hausser	Commander of Heeresgruppe G 5 April 1945 – 6 May 1945	Succeeded by none
