= Herbert Loch =

German general (1886–1976)

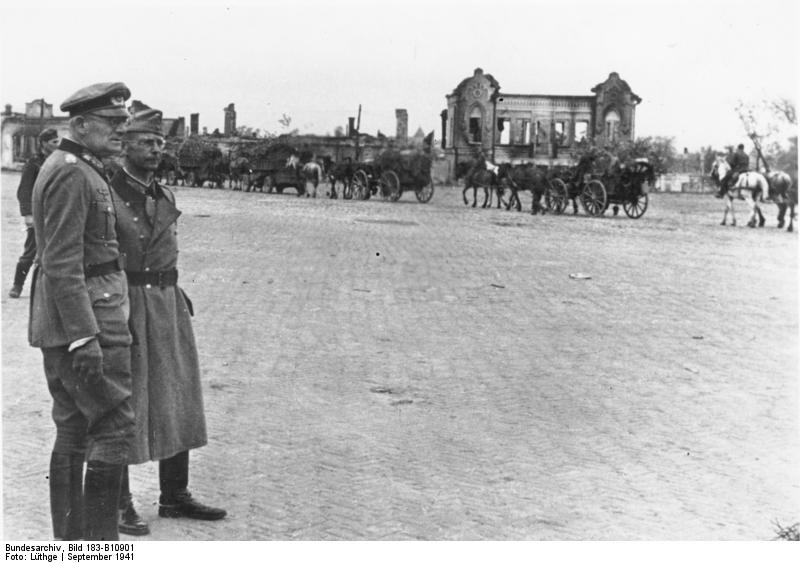
- Herbert Loch (left) and Maximilian von Weichs, 1941
- Born: 5 August 1886; Idar-Oberstein, Germany
- Died: 28 October 1976 (aged 90); Landau, Germany
- Military career
- Allegiance: German Empire; Weimar Republic; Nazi Germany
- Branch: German Army
- Service years: 1905–1945
- Rank: General der Artillerie
- Commands: 17th Infantry Division; XXVIII Army Corps; 18th Army
- Conflicts: World War I; World War II; Annexation of Austria; Invasion of Poland; Battle of Łódź (1939); Battle of France; Operation Barbarossa; Battle of Białystok–Minsk; Siege of Leningrad
- Awards: Knight's Cross of the Iron Cross

Herbert Loch (5 August 1886 – 28 October 1976) was a German general in the Wehrmacht during World War II who commanded the XXVIII Corps and the 18th Army. He was a recipient of the Knight's Cross of the Iron Cross of Nazi Germany.

== Awards and decorations ==
- Knight's Cross of the Iron Cross on 16 June 1940 as Generalleutnant and commander of 17. Infanterie-Division

Military offices
Preceded by Generalleutnant Erich Friderici	Commander of 17. Infanterie-Division; 1 April 1939 – 28 October 1941	Succeeded by Generalmajor Ernst Güntzel
Preceded by General der Infanterie Mauritz von Wiktorin	Commander of XXVIII. Armeekorps; 28 October 1941 – 25 May 1943	Succeeded by Generalleutnant Otto Sponheimer
Preceded by Generalleutnant Otto Sponheimer	Commander of XXVIII. Armeekorps; 30 June 1943 – 28 March 1944	Succeeded by Generalleutnant Gerhard Matzky
Preceded by Generaloberst Georg Lindemann	Commander of 18. Armee; 29 March 1944 – 2 September 1944	Succeeded by General der Infanterie Ehrenfried-Oskar Boege
