= Hubertus Lamey =

German general

- Born: 30 October 1896
- Died: 7 April 1981 (aged 84); Augsburg, Germany
- Military career
- Allegiance: German Empire; Weimar Republic; Nazi Germany
- Branch: Army
- Service years: 1915–1945
- Rank: Generalmajor
- Commands: 21st Infantry Division; 28th Jäger Division; 118th Jäger Division
- Conflicts: World War II
- Awards: Knight's Cross of the Iron Cross

Hubertus Lamey (30 October 1896 – 7 April 1981) was a German general in the Wehrmacht during World War II. He was a recipient of the Knight's Cross of the Iron Cross of Nazi Germany.

== Awards and decorations ==
- German Cross in Gold on 28 July 1943 as Oberst in Grenadier-Regiment 328
- Knight's Cross of the Iron Cross on 12 February 1944 as Oberst and deputy commander of the 28. Jäger-Division

Military offices
Preceded by Generalleutnant Gerhard Matzky	Commander of 21. Infanterie-Division; 1 October 1943 – December 1943	Succeeded by Generalleutnant Gerhard Matzky
Preceded by General der Infanterie Friedrich Schulz	Commander of 28. Jäger-Division; 25 November 1943 – January 1944	Succeeded by General der infanterie Hans Speth
Preceded by Generalleutnant Josef Kübler	Commander of 118. Jäger-Division; 10 July 1944 – 8 May 1945	Succeeded by None
