= Bernhard Vechtel =

German fighter ace and Knight's Cross recipient

- Bernhard Vechtel in World War II
- Born: 31 July 1920; Vohren near Warendorf
- Died: 21 August 1975 (aged 55); Speyer
- Burial place: Speyer Cemetery
- Military career
- Allegiance: Nazi Germany
- Branch: Luftwaffe
- Rank: Oberleutnant (first lieutenant)
- Unit: JG 51
- Commands: 14./JG 51
- Conflicts: World War II
- Awards: Knight's Cross of the Iron Cross

Bernhard Vechtel (31 July 1920 – 21 August 1975) was a fighter pilot in the Luftwaffe of Nazi Germany during World War II. He was a recipient of the Knight's Cross of the Iron Cross and Staffelkapitän (squadron leader) of 14. Staffel (14th squadron) of Jagdgeschwader 51 "Mölders" (JG 51—51st Fighter Wing). Vechtel was credited with 108 aerial victories in a total of 860 combat missions, all on the Eastern Front. Vechtel died on 21 August 1975 in Speyer.

== Early life and career ==
Vechtel was born on 31 July 1920 in Vohren, present-day part of Warendorf, at the time in the Province of Westphalia in the Weimar Republic. Following flight training, (Note: Flight training in the Luftwaffe progressed through the levels A1, A2 and B1, B2, referred to as A/B flight training. A training included theoretical and practical training in aerobatics, navigation, long-distance flights and dead-stick landings. The B courses included high-altitude flights, instrument flights, night landings and training to handle the aircraft in difficult situations.) he was posted to Jagdgeschwader 51 "Mölders" (JG 51—51st Fighter Wing) on 2 May 1942. There, he was assigned to the 10. Staffel (10th squadron) which was subordinated to the IV. Gruppe (4th group) of JG 51. At the time, 10. Staffel was headed by Leutnant Horst Haase while IV. Gruppe was commanded by Hauptmann Johann Knauth and based at an airfield in Vyazma on the Eastern Front.

== World War II ==
World War II in Europe had begun on Friday, 1 September 1939 when German forces invaded Poland. In June 1941, German forces had launched Operation Barbarossa, the invasion of the Soviet Union. In May 1942, IV. Gruppe was briefly withdrawn from combat for a period of maintenance and equipment overhaul at Smolensk. They were then sent to Dugino where it was tasked with providing fighter cover over the left flank of Army Group Center in the vicinity of the 9th Army.

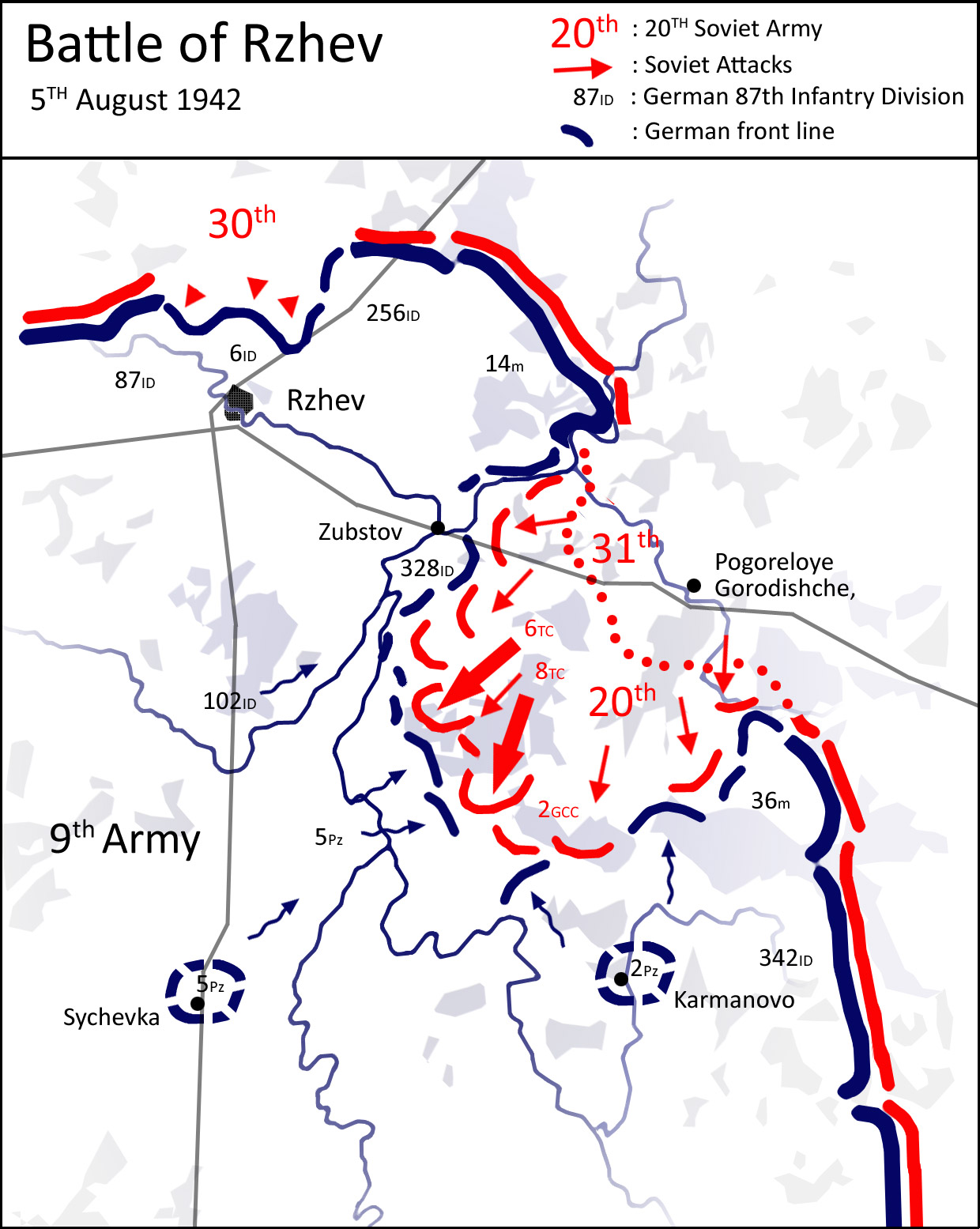
Attack on the Rzhev salient in August 1942

On 30 July 1942, the Soviet Kalinin Front launched the First Rzhev–Sychyovka Offensive Operation with the objective to crush the Rzhev salient held by the 9th Army. Vechtel claimed his first aerial victory on 2 August 1942 over an Ilyushin Il-2 ground attack aircraft northeast of Rzhev. By the end of 1942, he had claimed five further aerial victories and had been awarded the Iron Cross 2nd Class (Eisernes Kreuz zweiter Klasse). In March 1943, the Gruppe had just completed conversion from the Messerschmitt Bf 109 F-2 to the Focke-Wulf Fw 190 A-4 and was based at Smolensk. In that combat area, Army Group Centre had launched Operation Büffel, a series of retreats eliminating the Rzhev salient. On 21 March, IV. Gruppe was ordered to Bryansk where it was deployed over the left wing of Army Group Centre. In August 1943, JG 51 fought in the Soviet Belgorod-Kharkov Offensive Operation where his Gruppe supported the 8th Army.

On 3 January 1944, Vechtel was awarded the Honour Goblet of the Luftwaffe (Ehrenpokal der Luftwaffe) and the German Cross in Gold (Deutsches Kreuz in Gold) on 28 January 1944. In May 1944, IV. Gruppe of JG 51 was based at Lysiatychi. Here on 1 May, Vechtel claimed JG 51s 8000th aerial victory of the war, this was his 66th claim. On 22 June, Soviet forces launched Operation Bagration, the strategic offensive operation against Army Group Centre. In consequence, IV. Gruppe was moved to Mogilev that day and to an airfield named Bayary located 92 kilometers (57 miles) northeast of Minsk and 13 kilometers (8.1 miles) east of Barysaw. Following the German retreat, the Gruppe moved to an airfield at Lida, which is 150 kilometers (93 miles) west of Minsk, on 3 July.

Vechtel was awarded the Knight's Cross of the Iron Cross (Ritterkreuz des Eisernen Kreuzes) on 27 July 1944 after 79 aerial victories. Following his return from home leave, Vechtel had been promoted to Leutnant (second lieutenant) and served with 11. Staffel, also a squadron of IV. Gruppe. On 28 August, IV. Gruppe moved to Modlin Airfield located approximately 35 kilometers (22 miles) northwest of Warsaw. Here, the Gruppe predominately flew combat missions to the area north and northeast of Warsaw. On 15 August, as part of the group expansion from three Staffeln per Gruppe to four Staffeln per Gruppe, 10. Staffel was re-designated and became the 13. Staffel while Vechtel's 11. Staffel became the 14. Staffel of JG 51. On 1 September, Vechtel was shot down and wounded by anti-aircraft artillery in his Bf 109 G-6 (Werknummer 163631—factory number) 6 kilometers (3.7 miles) northwest of Wyszków.

=== Squadron leader and end of war ===
On 11 December 1944, Vechtel was appointed Staffelkapitän (squadron leader) of the 14. Staffel of JG 51, also a squadron of IV. Gruppe. He replaced Oberleutnant Horst Walther who was transferred. At the time, the Gruppe was commanded by Major Heinz Lange and was based at Modlin. Soviet forces launched the Vistula–Oder Offensive on 12 January 1945. Two days later, Soviet forces reached Modlin, forcing VI. Gruppe to move to Danzig-Langfuhr, present-day Wrzeszcz, Poland. On 25 March 1945, Vechtel was credited with his 100th aerial victory. He was the 99th Luftwaffe pilot to have shot down 100 aircraft. On 1 May, JG 51 received the order to relocate to Flensburg in northern Germany. Some of the pilots decided for themselves that the war was lost and deserted, including Vechtel. On 2 May, he refused to fly to Flensburg and led a Schwarm close to his hometown Warendorf near Münster. There, he arrived with two other pilots, a fourth pilot was shot down and captured by British forces.

== Later life ==
Vechtel died on 21 August 1975 at the age of 55 in Speyer, West Germany. He was buried at the Speyer Cemetery.

== Summary of career ==
=== Aerial victory claims ===
According to US historian David T. Zabecki, Vechtel was credited with 108 aerial victories. Spick and Weal also list him with 108 aerial victories claimed in 860 combat missions, all of which claimed on the Eastern Front, and a mission-to-claim ratio of 7.96. Mathews and Foreman, authors of Luftwaffe Aces — Biographies and Victory Claims, researched the German Federal Archives and also state that he claimed 108 aerial victories, all of which claimed on the Eastern Front. However, not all of his claims can be verified through the archives.

Victory claims were logged to a map-reference (PQ = Planquadrat), for example "PQ 47682". The Luftwaffe grid map (Jägermeldenetz) covered all of Europe, western Russia and North Africa and was composed of rectangles measuring 15 minutes of latitude by 30 minutes of longitude, an area of about 360 square miles (930 km^{2}). These sectors were then subdivided into 36 smaller units to give a location area 3 km × 4 km (1.9 mi × 2.5 mi) in size.

Chronicle of aerial victories
This and the ? (question mark) indicates information discrepancies listed by Prien, Stemmer, Balke, Bock, Mathews and Foreman.
Claim	Date	Time	Type	Location	Claim	Date	Time	Type	Location
– 10. Staffel of Jagdgeschwader 51 – Eastern Front — 1 May 1942 – 3 February 1943
1	2 August 1942	09:52	Il-2	PQ 47682; 15 km (9.3 mi) northeast of Rzhev	4	6 December 1942	09:22	Il-2	PQ 07732
2	3 September 1942	14:36	MiG-3	east of Sychyovka	5	16 December 1942	08:15	MiG-3	15 km (9.3 mi) southeast of Velikiye Luki
3	3 December 1942	13:05	MiG-3	5 km (3.1 mi) west of Tuleblja; 5 km (3.1 mi) west of Velikiye Luki	6	17 December 1942	11:45	Il-2	7 km (4.3 mi) east of Ischewosew
– 10. Staffel of Jagdgeschwader 51 – Eastern Front — 4 February – 28 October 1943
7	18 March 1943	15:45	Il-2	PQ 35 Ost 45522; 10 km (6.2 mi) northeast of Utrikowo	25	21 September 1943	09:01	Yak-9	northeast of Nowo Stepjanka
8	7 May 1943	04:25	Il-2	PQ 35 Ost 63279; 20 km (12 mi) south of Zalegoshch	26	24 September 1943	13:28	Yak-9	northwest of Kremenchuk
9	7 May 1943	04:29	MiG-3	PQ 35 Ost 63281; 20 km (12 mi) south-southeast of Zalegoshch	27	24 September 1943	13:30	Yak-9	west of Khmilnyk
10	8 June 1943	19:16	Il-2	PQ 35 Ost 64843; 20 km (12 mi) south of Mtsensk	28	26 September 1943	13:25	Yak-1	south of Wassilijewka
11	8 June 1943	19:19	Il-2	PQ 35 Ost 64853; 20 km (12 mi) southeast of Mtsensk	29	27 September 1943	10:32	Il-2 m.H. (Note: The "m.H." refers to an Ilyushin Il-2 with rear gunner (mit Heckschütze).)	south of Gorodajewka
12	2 August 1943	08:32	LaGG-3	PQ 35 Ost 53453; 10 km (6.2 mi) southwest of Kromy	30	27 September 1943	10:33	Il-2 m.H.	northeast of Ssusslowka
13	2 August 1943	08:39	Il-2 m.H.	PQ 35 Ost 53474; 20 km (12 mi) southwest of Kromy	31	27 September 1943	14:30	Pe-2	west of Schulgowka
14	2 August 1943	12:00	LaGG-3	PQ 35 Ost 53654; 20 km (12 mi) southwest of Kromy	32	29 September 1943	11:55	Yak-1	west of Sloschenkowo
15	7 August 1943	11:40	P-40	west of Peschkowa	33	29 September 1943	12:10	Il-2 m.H.	north of Waldorf
16	15 August 1943	05:05	Il-2	PQ 35 Ost 60152; 10 km (6.2 mi) south of Kharkiv	34	4 October 1943	06:55	Yak-1	east of Tarassowka
17	16 August 1943	18:25	La-5	east of Kulakovka	35	6 October 1943	12:46	Yak-9	southwest of Schulgowka
18	17 August 1943	05:06	Yak-1	east of Gurinowka	36	7 October 1943	15:03	P-39	west of Orlik
19	19 August 1943	15:00	La-5	southeast of Dergatschevka	37	12 October 1943	08:15	Yak-9	north of Lake Sennitza
20	19 August 1943	15:05	La-5	southwest of Ulitschewka	38	21 October 1943	08:55	Yak-9	northeast of Sselenoye
21	21 August 1943	16:25	Il-2	south of Guty	39	22 October 1943	08:55	Il-2 m.H.	southwest of Sybkoye
22	1 September 1943	12:10	Yak-9	north of Borodino	40	26 October 1943	14:38	P-39	northwest of Chervonaya Znamenka
23	1 September 1943	18:11	Il-2 m.H.	northeast of Berniki	41	28 October 1943	06:23	P-39	southwest of Michailovka
24	20 September 1943	06:39	Il-2 m.H.	southeast of Igun					
– 12. Staffel of Jagdgeschwader 51 – Eastern Front — 29 October 1943 – 22 November 1943
42	29 October 1943	11:06	Pe-2	northeast of Pogelnastoje	46	20 November 1943	11:34	Il-2 m.H.	west of Salbachowka
43	30 October 1943	12:28	Il-2 m.H.	west of Annowka	47	20 November 1943	13:05	Yak-9	southwest of Huliaipole
44	5 November 1943	13:51	La-5	Rameropol	48	22 November 1943	12:30	P-39	2 km (1.2 mi) northwest of Sybkoje
45	20 November 1943	11:30	Yak-1	southeast of Mirnaja	49	22 November 1943	12:40	P-39	2 km (1.2 mi) east of Trudowka
– 10. Staffel of Jagdgeschwader 51 – Eastern Front — 28 November 1943 – 31 May 1944
50	28 November 1943	11:12	Il-2 m.H.	Petrowka	65	30 April 1944	08:56	Il-2 m.H.	PQ 25 Ost 50543; 15 km (9.3 mi) southeast of Berezhany
51	30 November 1943	08:25	Il-2 m.H.	PQ 34 Ost 49796; 55 km (34 mi) north of Nikopol	66	1 May 1944	10:02	Il-2 m.H.	PQ 24 Ost 59315; 20 km (12 mi) north of Kolomea
52	30 November 1943	08:27	Il-2 m.H.	PQ 34 Ost 49815; 30 km (19 mi) south-southwest of Dnepropetrovsk	67	1 May 1944	10:06	Yak-9	PQ 24 Ost 59318; 20 km (12 mi) north of Kolomea
53	27 February 1944	09:38	Pe-2	PQ 35 Ost 14567 vicinity of Krasnopillia	68	3 May 1944	09:07	Yak-9	PQ 24 Ost 59358; 20 km (12 mi) northeast of Kolomea
54	27 March 1944	10:55	Pe-2	PQ 35 Ost 05693 vicinity of Gorki	69	3 May 1944	18:35? (Note: According to Mathews and Foreman claimed at 18:38.)	La-5	PQ 24 Ost 59378 vicinity of Kolomea
55	9 April 1944	18:22	Yak-9	PQ 35 Ost 50763; 45 km (28 mi) south-southwest of Ternopil	70	4 May 1944	18:54? (Note: According to Mathews and Foreman claimed as a Lavochkin La-5 at 18:57.)	Yak-9?	PQ 25 Ost 50474 vicinity of Ternopil
56	10 April 1944	11:48	Il-2	PQ 35 Ost 50734; 30 km (19 mi) south-southwest of Ternopil	71	5 May 1944	11:18? (Note: According to Mathews and Foreman claimed at 11:08.)	Yak-1	PQ 25 Ost 50563; 20 km (12 mi) south-southwest of Ternopil
57	15 April 1944	16:24	Yak-9	PQ 35 Ost 50522; 25 km (16 mi) east of Berezhany	72	5 May 1944	18:31? (Note: According to Mathews and Foreman claimed at 18:39.)	Yak-1	PQ 25 Ost 50562; 20 km (12 mi) south-southwest of Ternopil
58	18 April 1944	11:55	La-5	PQ 24 Ost 59151; 40 km (25 mi) north-northeast of Kolomea	73	15 May 1944	18:47	La-5	PQ 25 Ost 50431
59	19 April 1944	16:42	Yak-9	PQ 24 Ost 59122; 40 km (25 mi) east of Stanislau	74	24 May 1944	05:44	Yak-9	PQ 25 Ost 50616; 10 km (6.2 mi) south of Ternopil
60	22 April 1944	16:42? (Note: According to Mathews and Foreman claimed as a Yakovlev Yak-9 at 16:35.)	Yak-1?	PQ 25 Ost 50871; 25 km (16 mi) south of Ternopil	75	28 May 1944	06:34	La-5	PQ 25 Ost 50534; 15 km (9.3 mi) southwest of Ternopil
61	23 April 1944	10:57	Il-2	PQ 25 Ost 50582; 25 km (16 mi) southeast of Berezhany	76	29 May 1944	06:47	La-5	PQ 24 Ost 59376 vicinity of Kolomea
62	27 April 1944	15:52	Il-2 m.H.	PQ 24 Ost 59311; 20 km (12 mi) north of Kolomea	77	31 May 1944	11:16? (Note: According to Mathews and Foreman claimed at 11:12.)	La-5	PQ 24 Ost 59375 vicinity of Kolomea
63	27 April 1944	18:22	Il-2 m.H.	PQ 24 Ost 59314; 20 km (12 mi) north of Kolomea	78	31 May 1944	14:32	La-5	PQ 24 Ost 49498; 5 km (3.1 mi) west of Kolomea
64	30 April 1944	08:54	Il-2 m.H.	PQ 25 Ost 40661; 10 km (6.2 mi) south of Berezhany	79	31 May 1944	14:43	Yak-9	PQ 24 Ost 59375; 10 km (6.2 mi) south of Kolomea
– 11. Staffel of Jagdgeschwader 51 – Eastern Front — August 1944
80	13 August 1944	16:32	Yak-9	PQ 24 Ost 25644; 40 km (25 mi) northeast of Łomża	82	13 August 1944	18:01	Yak-9	PQ 24 Ost 24625; 45 km (28 mi) north-northwest of Białystok
81	13 August 1944	16:33	La-5	PQ 24 Ost 24627; 45 km (28 mi) north-northwest of Białystok					
– 14. Staffel of Jagdgeschwader 51 – Eastern Front — August 1944 – May 1945
83	15 August 1944	18:13	La-5	PQ 25 Ost 25491; 25 km (16 mi) east of Trakehnen	88	22 August 1944	10:37	Yak-9	PQ 25 Ost 36215; 15 km (9.3 mi) east of Schaulen
84	15 August 1944	18:25	La-5	20 km (12 mi) west-northwest of Marijampolė	89	24 August 1944	08:53	Yak-9	PQ 25 Ost 37543; 55 km (34 mi) north-northwest of Schaulen
85	17 August 1944	11:12	Il-2 m.H.	PQ 25 Ost 36374; 20 km (12 mi) northeast of Nemakščiai	90	24 August 1944	11:22	P-39	PQ 25 Ost 37385; 25 km (16 mi) southwest of Mitau
86	17 August 1944	11:13	Il-2 m.H.	PQ 25 Ost 36375; 20 km (12 mi) east-southeast of Nemakščiai	91	24 August 1944	15:22	La-5	PQ 25 Ost 27665; 60 km (37 mi) northeast of Telsche
87	17 August 1944	16:35	Yak-9	10 km (6.2 mi) south of Nemakščiai					
According to Mathews and Foreman, aerial victories 92 to 99 were not documented. The author Prien, Stemmer, Balke and Bock state that the aerial victory records of IV. Gruppe dated later than November 1944 are incomplete.
100	25 March 1945	—	unknown						
According to Mathews and Foreman, aerial victories 101 to 108 were not documented.

=== Awards ===
- Iron Cross (1939) 2nd and 1st Class
- Honor Goblet of the Luftwaffe on 3 April 1944 as Feldwebel and pilot
- German Cross in Gold on 28 January 1944 as Feldwebel in the 10./Jagdgeschwader 51
- Knight's Cross of the Iron Cross on 27 July 1944 as pilot and Fahnenjunker-Oberfeldwebel in the 10./Jagdgeschwader 51 "Mölders"
