= Hellmuth Pfeifer =

German military general

Hans-Hellmuth Pfeifer
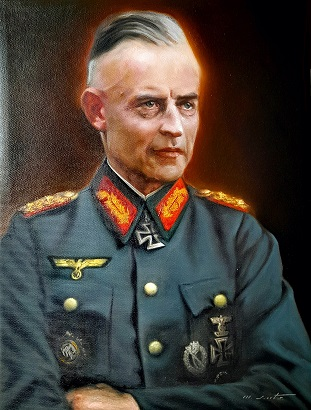
- Born: 18 February 1894; Altenburg, Thuringia, German Empire
- Died: 22 April 1945 (aged 51); Finale Emilia, Emilia-Romagna, Italy
- Spouse: Oda Seitz
- Military career
- Allegiance: German Empire; Weimar Republic; Nazi Germany
- Branch: German Imperial Army; Reichswehr; Army (Wehrmacht)
- Rank: Generalleutnant
- Commands: 65th Infantry Division
- Conflicts: World War I World War II: Battle of France; Operation Barbarossa; Italian Campaign; Moro River Campaign; Battle of Anzio; Operation Diadem; Defence of the Gothic Line; Spring 1945 offensive in Italy
- Awards: Knight's Cross of the Iron Cross with Oak Leaves

Hans-Hellmuth Pfeifer (18 February 1894 – 22 April 1945) was a German general during World War II. A veteran of World War I, he held higher command positions in WWII, among other, that of the 65th Infantry Division in Italy, selecting its hand grenade symbol which earned the nickname "The Hand Grenade Division."

Pfeifer was killed in action in Finale Emilia, in the Bologna sector, on 22 April 1945; mere days before the final Axis surrender in Italy. He was a recipient of the Knight's Cross of the Iron Cross with Oak Leaves and a staunch Nazi.

== Early military career ==
Hans-Hellmuth Pfeifer joined the 3rd Kurhessisches Infantry Regiment "von Wittich" No. 83 (3. Kurhessisches Infanterie-Regiment "von Wittich" Nr. 83), Kassel, on March 16, 1912 as an officer cadet (Fahnenjunker). On August 18, 1913, he was promoted to lieutenant (Leutnant) in the 4th Hanoverian Infantry Regiment No. 164 (4. Hannoversches Infanterie-Regiment Nr. 164), patented 19 August 1911; serving with it as a company officer in the First World War.

After the end of the war he was accepted into the Imperial Army as a first lieutenant (Oberleutnant). He joined the Reichswehr's Infantry Regiment 20 in 1919. With the 200,000-man transitional army in the spring of 1920, he was then part of the staff of the 10th Brigade as an aide-de-camp (Ordonanzoffizier). When the 100,000-man army of the Reichswehr was formed, he was transferred to the 16th Infantry Regiment on 1 October 1920. On 1 October 1921, he was transferred to the 16th Cavalry Regiment as a squadron officer. He was dismissed from active service in the Reichswehr on 1 April 1922. He then worked for the next few years as a department head in the tariff and freight department of Gutehoffnungshütte Oberhausen.

He married Oda Seitz on 5 April 1922.

From 1 April 1929, he took over as the publishing director of the Ludendorff's publishing house Volkswarte (People's Observatory) in Munich. In this position, among other things, he spread anti-Semitic conspiracy theories. On 1 July 1934, he rejoined the Reichswehr as a captain (Hauptmann). His seniority was set on 1 October 1933. During the expansion of the Reichswehr into the Wehrmacht, Hans-Hellmuth was appointed company commander in one of the two infantry regiments by the Infantry Command VI (Oldenburg or Osnabrück). When the units were exposed on 15 October 1935, he was appointed company commander in the 58th Infantry Regiment. On 1 August 1936, he was promoted to major as such. From 1 October 1937 he was then active in the High Command of the Wehrmacht (Oberkommando der Wehrmacht, OKW). There he belonged to the domestic department (I) of the Wehrmacht General Affairs Office (Amtsgruppe Allgemeine Wehrmachtangelegenheiten, AWA); remaining in that capacity by the beginning of World War II, in the summer of 1939. At this time, Pfeifer published several articles that took up the subject of the political soldier.

== World War II ==
=== Invasion of France ===
Pfeifer took command of the 3rd battalion of 185th Infantry Regiment in the 87th Infantry Division on 27 September 1939. As such, Pfeifer was promoted to lieutenant colonel (Oberstleutnant) on 1 December 1939. In the spring of 1940 he led his battalion within the newly established division in the Battle of France. The 87th Infantry Division occupied Paris in June 1940. He was then appointed commander of the 185 Infantry Regiment on 5 July 1940.

=== Invasion of the Soviet Union ===
From the beginning of the summer of 1941, he led his regiment in the Operation Barbarossa in the attack on Central Russia. On 1 October 1941, he was promoted to colonel (Oberst); his seniority was set on 1 June 1941. He distinguished himself during the German advance, for which he was awarded the Knight's Cross of the Iron Cross on 26 November 1941. Pfeifer remained in command when his regiment was renamed Grenadier-Regiment 185 in October 1942 and moved to the reserve list on 20 November.

On 31 October 1942 he was awarded the German Cross in Gold in the Battles of Rzhev. On 18 November 1942, he was seriously wounded. After his recovery, he took part in the 5th or 6th divisional leader course in Berlin in July 1943. On 1 September 1943, he was promoted to major general (Generalmajor). As such, he was appointed commander of the 65th Infantry Division in Italy on 1 December 1943.

=== Defense of Italy ===
Aged 49, he was described in the divisional history as having "indomitable energy" and of being a "military role model"; unusually for a general, Hans-Hellmuth Pfeifer wore the Infantry Assault Badge on his uniform, and also commanded from the front. He inherited a badly depleted division, whose complement of conscripted ethnic Germans that regularly deserted and surrendered to the Allies. In order to inspire his then dispirited troops, Hans-Hellmut changed the division's tactical insignia from the letter Z to a stylized hand grenade, an insignia that became very popular with the soldiers and which the division retained for the rest of the war.

During his time in Italy, the 65th division was suspected of committing numerous atrocities against Italian civilians. The 65th Division has been identified as possibly being responsible for 25 separate acts of violence in which Italian civilians were killed. Many of the reports lack evidence of specific perpetrators, only noting that the killings occurred in the 65th Division's area of operations. The first such incident occurred in relation to the Frosini and Moniciano bridge destruction when an Italian civilian was tried by German military tribunal for espionage, found guilty, and a sentence of death was carried out. Many of the alleged murders involved confirmed members of the Italian resistance movement that sprang up in northern Italy to oppose the fascist puppet state.

One of the interactions in the divisional area was the Ronchidoso massacre, Emilia-Romagna, which also included the 42nd Jäger Division, between 28 and 30 September 1944, when 66 civilians were executed. The Atlas of Nazi war crimes in Italy mentions that it is possible this massacre was actually perpetrated by SS troops.

In total, five separate incidents in which Italian civilians were killed in the 65th Division's area of operations occurred in June 1944 (18 victims), three in July 1944 (22 victims), nine in August 1944 (42 victims), eight in September 1944 (125 victims), and one in October 1944 (2 victims). A number of these interactions were reprisals precipitated by the killing of German soldiers by partisans, including in one case the execution of a German prisoner.

The new insignia of "The Hand Grenade Division".

The Divisional newsletter was named Die Handgranate ("The Hand Grenade"), and for Christmas 1944 large quantities of a special holiday edition were printed with the idea that they should be sent back to families at home. The edition contained ruminations on the war and a short report "From the War History of our Infantry Division."

In the heavy defensive battles in June 1944 in the Alban Hills, southeast of Rome, he distinguished himself in particular. On 1 June 1944, he was promoted to lieutenant general (Generalleutnant). and pulled out of the line in January 1944. On 2 June 1944, he was mentioned by name in the daily Wehrmacht report:

In this section of the front, the 65th Infantry Division under Lieutenant General Pfeiffer, the 3rd Panzergrenadier Division under Major General Hecker, reinforced by parts of the 4th Parachute Division, and a combat group composed of units of the Army and Parachute Troops under Lieutenant General Greiner, superbly supported by artillery and anti-aircraft artillery of the Luftwaffe, especially excellent.

On 5 September 1944, he was awarded the Oak Leaves for the Knight's Cross of the Iron Cross. On 22 April 1945 he died as commander of the 65th Infantry Division near Finale Emilia, north of Bologna.

== Awards and decorations ==
- Iron Cross (1914) 2nd Class & 1st Class (3 October 1914)
- Clasp to the Iron Cross (1939) 2nd Class (8 June 1940) & 1st Class (16 June 1940)
- German Cross in Gold on 31 October 1942 as Oberst in Infanterie-Regiment 185
- Knight's Cross of the Iron Cross with Oak Leaves
  - Knight's Cross on 26 November 1941 as Oberstleutnant and commander of Infanterie-Regiment 185
  - Oak Leaves on 5 September 1944 as Generalleutnant and commander of 65.Infanterie-Division

Military offices
| Preceded by Generalleutnant Gustav Heistermann von Ziehlberg | Commander of 65. Infanterie-Division; 1 December 1943 – 22 April 1945 | Succeeded by None |
