= Emil Vogt =

Swiss footballer

Personal information
- Full name: Emil Vogt
- Date of birth: 1897
- Date of death: 1967 (aged 69–70)
- Position: Midfielder

Senior career*
Years	Team	Apps	(Gls)
1904–1909	FC Basel	4+	(0)
- * Club domestic league appearances and goals

Emil Vogt (1897-1967) was a footballer who played as midfielder during the early 1900s.

== Football career ==
Vogt joined FC Basel's first team for their 1904–05 season. Vogt played his domestic league debut for the club in the home game in the Landhof on 27 November 1904 as Basel won 3–0 against FC Weissenbühl Bern.

In the Swiss Serie A seasons 1904–05 and 1908–09 Vogt played at least five games for Basel. At least four of these games were in the Swiss Series A and one was a friendly game. He probably played more games than mentioned, but the documentation is not available. (Note: The player lines-ups and goal scorers for 3 of the 8 league games in the 1904–05 season are unknown or incomplete.) (Note: The player lines-ups and goal scorers for 10 of the 14 league games in the 1908–09 season are unknown or incomplete.)

It may be presumed that in the intermediate seasons Vogt played for the club's reserve team, who at that time played in the Serie C the third tier of Swiss football.

Later he worked as banker and trustee for the "Allgemeine Treuhand AG" in Basel among others.

== Notes ==
=== Footnotes ===
Incomplete league matches 1904–05 season: FCB-Bern, OB-FCB, FCB-YB

Incomplete 1908–09 season league matches: FCB-YF, FCZ-FCB, FCB-Aarau, FCW-FCB, FCB-FCSG, YF-FCB, FCB-FCB, FCB-OB, GC-FCB, FCSG-FCB

=== Sources ===
- Rotblau: Jahrbuch Saison 2017/2018. Publisher: FC Basel Marketing AG. ISBN 978-3-7245-2189-1
- Die ersten 125 Jahre. Publisher: Josef Zindel im Friedrich Reinhardt Verlag, Basel. ISBN 978-3-7245-2305-5
- Verein "Basler Fussballarchiv" Homepage

(NB: Despite all efforts, the editors of these books and the authors in "Basler Fussballarchiv" have failed to be able to identify all the players, their date and place of birth or date and place of death, who played in the games during the early years of FC Basel)
