= Hans Speth =

German general (1897–1985)

Hans-Ludwig Speth
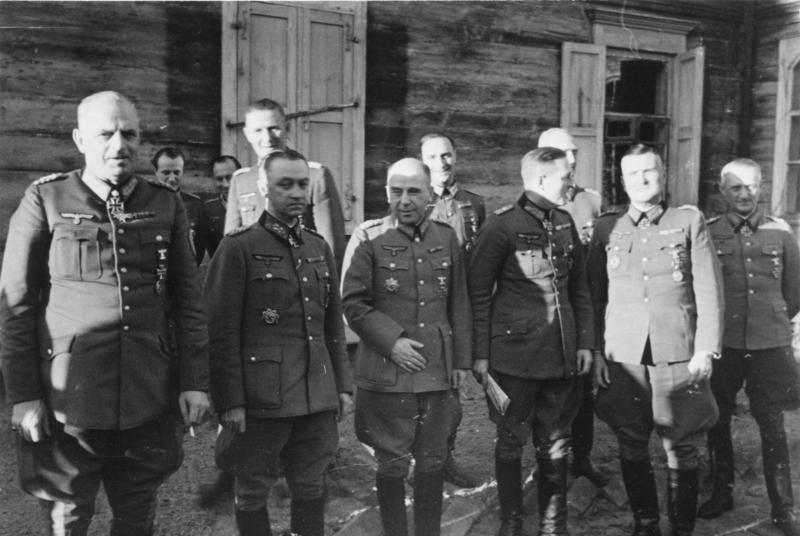
- Hans Speth (1st from right)
- Born: 7 October 1897
- Died: 30 April 1985 (aged 87)
- Military career
- Allegiance: Nazi Germany
- Branch: Army
- Rank: General of the Artillery
- Commands: 28th Jäger Division
- Conflicts: World War II
- Awards: Knight's Cross of the Iron Cross

Hans-Ludwig Speth (7 October 1897 – 30 April 1985) was a German general during World War II who commanded the 28th Jäger Division. He was a recipient of the Knight's Cross of the Iron Cross of Nazi Germany.

== Awards and decorations ==
- Knight's Cross of the Iron Cross on 23 February 1944 as Generalleutnant and commander of 28. Jäger-Division

Military offices
Preceded by Generalmajor Hubertus Lamey	Commander of 28. Jäger-Division; January 1944 – 27 April 1944	Succeeded by Generalleutnant Gustav Heistermann von Ziehlberg
