= Otto Sponheimer =

German General in WWII (1886–1961)

- Born: 19 December 1886; Nürnberg, German Empire
- Died: 14 March 1961 (aged 74); Bad Kötzting, West Germany
- Military career
- Allegiance: German Empire; Weimar Republic; Nazi Germany
- Branch: German Army
- Service years: 1907–1920; 1935–1945
- Rank: General der Infanterie
- Commands: 21st Infantry Division; XXVIII Army Corps; LXVII Army Corps
- Conflicts: World War I; World War II; Invasion of Poland; Battle of France; Operation Barbarossa; Siege of Leningrad; Kingisepp–Gdov Offensive; Battle of Narva (1944); Battle for Narva Bridgehead; Operation Market Garden
- Awards: Knight's Cross of the Iron Cross

Otto Sponheimer (19 December 1886 – 14 March 1961) was a German general (General of the Infantry) in the Wehrmacht during World War II who commanded several corps. He was also a recipient of the Knight's Cross of the Iron Cross of Nazi Germany.

== Awards and decorations ==
- Knight's Cross of the Iron Cross on 8 August 1941 as Generalleutnant and commander of 21. Infanterie-Division

Military offices
| Preceded by Generalleutnant Kuno-Hans von Both | Commander of 21. Infanterie-Division; 1 November 1939 – April 1942 | Succeeded by Generalleutnant Wilhelm Bohnstedt |
| Preceded by Generalleutnant Wilhelm Bohnstedt | Commander of 21. Infanterie-Division; April 1942 – 10 January 1943 | Succeeded by Generalleutnant Gerhard Matzky |
| Preceded by Generaloberst Carl Hilpert | Commander of LIV. Armeekorps; 1 August 1943 - 2 February 1944 | Succeeded by Johannes Frießner (Army Detachment Narva) |
| Preceded by Generalleutnant Carl Püchler | Commander of LXVII. Armeekorps; 25 July 1944 - 25 October 1944 | Succeeded by Generalleutnant Friedrich-August Schack |
