= Siegfried Verhein =

- Born: 1 October 1897
- Died: 30 June 1963 (age 65)
- Military career
- Allegiance: Nazi Germany
- Branch: Army
- Service years: 1915–1930; 1934–1945
- Rank: Generalleutnant
- Unit: 551st (Volks)grenadier Division
- Conflicts: Zemland Offensive
- Awards: Knight's Cross of the Iron Cross

Siegfried Verhein (1 October 1897 – 30 June 1963) was a German general in the Wehrmacht during World War II. He was a recipient of the Knight's Cross of the Iron Cross of Nazi Germany.

Verhein surrendered to the Red Army in the course of the Soviet 1945 Zemland Offensive. Convicted as a war criminal in the Soviet Union, he was held until 1955.

== Awards and decorations ==
- Knight's Cross of the Iron Cross on 28 February 1945 as Generalmajor and leader of a Kampfgruppe in the 551. Volks-Grenadier-Division
