= 65th Infantry Division (Wehrmacht) =

- 65. Infanterie-Division
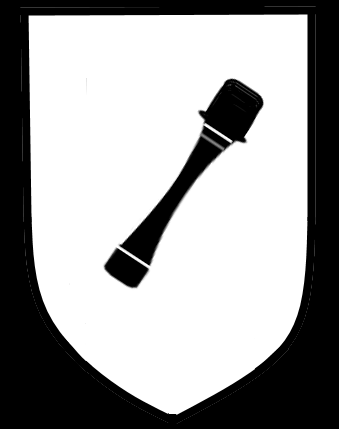
- Late war 65. Infanterie Division vehicle insignia
- Active: July 1942–22 April 1945
- Country: Germany
- Branch: German Army
- Type: Infantry
- Size: Division
- Nickname(s): Hand Grenade Division
- Engagements: World War II: Italian Campaign; Moro River Campaign; Battle of Anzio; Operation Diadem; Gothic Line Offensive; Spring 1945 offensive in Italy

Commanders
- Notable commanders: Gustav Heistermann von Ziehlberg; Hellmuth Pfeifer

The 65th Infantry Division (German: 65. Infanterie-Division) was a German division in World War II. It was formed in July 1942.

== History ==
=== Formation ===
The division was formed in July 1942 at the training ground at Bitche.

=== Occupation Duty ===
The 65th moved to the Netherlands in October 1942 for occupation duty. The division spent the next eight months occupying Coastal Defence Sector A1 (Walcheren Island, North Beveland, and South Beveland). The division sent drafts to rebuild the shattered 44th Infantry Division (Hoch-und-Deutschmeister) and in return received large numbers of recruits from Silesia.

=== The Move to Italy ===
The division moved to France in the spring of 1943. In August 1943 the division moved briefly to Austria for two weeks before heading south into Italy just as the fascist government was being overthrown and Italy changed sides. The division took up coastal defence duties on the Adriatic from 10 to 22 August 1943 and moved to the west coast at La Spezia in September. Units of the division were on sentry duty when Italy changed sides, and soldiers watched ships of the Italian Navy sortie from La Spezia and Genoa, including the battleship Roma.

In October 1943 the division moved to the Chieti area, and then to the Adriatic coast between Pescara and Ortona.

=== First Combat: the Sangro ===
The 65th Division was ordered to man positions on the Winter Line. Initially stationed on the coast, the inexperienced division was shifted inland in favour of the more experienced 1st Parachute Division. The latter fought at Ortona where it battled the 1st Canadian Division at Christmastime, 1943 before withdrawing to the Arielli River. The 65th instead fought at Orsogna, giving ground to the 8th Indian Division and the 2nd New Zealand Division, but held on to the city of Orsogna before being relieved. The division had suffered enormous losses, particularly in infantry.

The division was relieved by the 334th Infantry Division in the last days of 1943, and relocated to Genoa where it was partly reconstituted. At the same time the division reorganized as a "Type 1944" Division, with three infantry regiments (145, 146, 147) of two battalions each rather than two regiments of three battalions. The reorganization increased the division's firepower (particularly in terms of anti-tank guns and infantry howitzers) while conserving manpower.

The Allied invasion of Anzio caused an emergency call-out of the division, per "Case Richard" which was a pre-planned response to an Allied amphibious landing behind German lines.

=== Anzio ===
Grenadier Regiment 145 and 147 relocated to the Anzio area, and elements of the division went into action as "Kampfgruppe Pfeifer." The division fought for the most part west of the Anziata (the road linking Anzio to the Alban Hills) and at times had elements of the 4th Parachute Division under command. Elements of the division helped reduce the British salient at Campoleone and then participated in Operation Fischfang, the full-scale counter-offensive aimed at splitting the Anzio beachhead and pushing the Allies back into the sea. The division suffered heavy casualties due to Allied artillery and air power, and after Fischfang petered out the two Grenadier Regiments were withdrawn to rest.

On 20 March 1944 a soldier in the 5th Company, Grenadier Regiment 147 wrote to his wife:

There are now two serious, unsuccessful attacks behind us, probably a third will follow, and we have a few hours of rest right now, but today we have been replaced in the firing line and are living in a cave right behind the front. Some have fallen and are still lying outside, because we can not reach them. After five days of uninterrupted action we are dirty, unshaven and tired enough to fall over. I am the last of my company's squad and platoon leaders, all the others are dead or wounded.

Following the failure of Operation Fischfang, representatives of the combat units at Anzio were summoned to the Wolfsschanze. A company commander in Grenadier Regiment 145 is quoted in the divisional history:

From my command post in the front line a few kilometers north of the East-West road I was ordered to the Führer's “Wolf’s Lair” headquarters in Rastenburg / East Prussia for three days. During my travel, various headquarters wanted to tell me their individual experiences and concerns to pass on. I was finally received in a suburb of Rome by the supreme commander of the 14th Army, Generaloberst v. Mackensen. From there I went by Kübelwagen to Florence and then used the leave train to Berlin. At last a night-delivery train took me to the Führer's headquarters. There were four of us from the beachhead and I was the representative of the 65th Infantry Division. You couldn’t believe what was told to us there! Some new weapons were shown, and otherwise we were questioned up and down about why the front wasn’t moving at Nettuno. To everyone we gave the familiar response: Many dogs are the rabbit's death!

A unique circumstance occurred in February 1944 when Leutnant Heinrich Wunn participated in actions for which he was nominated (and ultimately bestowed) the Knight's Cross of the Iron Cross, while in the same action an enemy soldier was nominated for (and ultimately bestowed) the Victoria Cross, marking an occasion in which opposing forces nominated a soldier for their highest bravery award for the same battle. When the final Allied offensive operations at Anzio began at the end of May, Wunn found himself in charge of a defensive position. After beating back five attacks by British infantry and tanks, the British are reported to have demanded Wunn's surrender. He reported the exchange to the divisional commander. "After bloody rebuff, enemy calls for surrender of Strongpoint Wunn. My reply: Götz von Berlichingen!"

=== After Anzio ===
The division saw further action in the fight for Rome, and later fought at Florence, the Futa Pass and the Battle of Bologna before surrendering to the Allies near the Po River in April 1945.

The division and its leadership were mentioned during Hitler's daily situation conference on 18 June 1944:

HITLER: How are the commanders of these units?
JODL: The 65th [Infantry] Division is good and has always been good.

Following the war, all German formations were analyzed by U.S. Army intelligence through interrogations of German officers. Ludwig Graf von Ingelheim assessed the 65th Division's performance as such in 1947:

Established in Holland in 1942, it remained there until the autumn of 1943. Relocated to the La Spezia area in September 1943, from October 1943 in the front line. Division had worked well and was one of the good infantry divisions.

The U.S. Army's official historian of the Italian campaign, Martin Blumenson, noted that the 5th Army's wartime intelligence had a different opinion that may not have been well founded:

The units of the Fifth Army that had fought in December were tired and discouraged. There was a tendency in some quarters to downgrade the German opposition. For example, one intelligence report made much of the 'remarkable background' of the divisions in the Tenth Army - the 44th, 94th, and 305th remade after Stalingrad, the 15th Panzer Grenadier and Hermann Goering reconstituted after Tunisia, the 3d Panzer Grenadier, renumbered but the same mediocre 386th, the 29th Panzer Grenadier, a milking of the 345th, the 1st Parachute drawn from the 7th, the 26th Panzer from the 23d Infantry - 'Only [the] 65[th] is an original invention, and it may hardly be regarded as a success.' Yet the fact was that the Germans had fought resourcefully and well.

== Partisan warfare and alleged war crimes ==
Following the retreat from Rome in June 1944, the division found the civil population increasingly war-weary and hostile. While relations with civilians had always been correct, if not warm, even after Italy defected, the divisional historian noted that a marked change occurred after the fall of Rome when the division relocated to northern Italy for recuperation.

One of the strongest partisan bands was discovered on 16 June in the Roccastrada area with 400 men. The main activity of the partisans was road closures, bridge destruction, power and phone line sabotage, abduction of political prisoners from prisons of the Italian militia, raids on individual motor vehicles, small motor vehicle columns and messengers. German authorities repeatedly admonished the Italian population by appeals not to support the partisan gangs. German units tried to protect themselves by strengthening sentries and patrols and by restricting the movements of civilians. In addition, security and hunting patrols were formed on a case-by-case basis and armed parties were used to attack the gangs. For example, following the demolition of the bridges at Frosini and Monticiano, the security group Riecher (from the divisional Füsilier Battalion) secured the sector Rosia - Torniella against partisan gangs on the road Siena - Grosseto from the 15 to 19 June.

The 65th Division has been identified as possibly being responsible for 25 separate acts of violence in which Italian civilians were killed. Many of the reports lack evidence of specific perpetrators, only noting that the killings occurred in the 65th Division's area of operations. The first such incident occurred in relation to the Frosini and Moniciano bridge destruction when an Italian civilian was tried by German military tribunal for espionage, found guilty, and a sentence of death was carried out. Many of the alleged murders involved confirmed members of the Italian resistance movement that sprang up in northern Italy to oppose the fascist puppet state.

One of the interactions in the divisional area was the Ronchidoso massacre in Emilia-Romagna, which also included the 42nd Jäger Division, between 28 and 30 September 1944, when 66 civilians were executed. The Atlas of Nazi war crimes in Italy mentions that it is possible this massacre was actually perpetrated by SS troops.

In total, five separate incidents in which Italian civilians were killed in the 65th Division's area of operations occurred in June 1944 (18 victims), three in July 1944 (22 victims), nine in August 1944 (42 victims), eight in September 1944 (125 victims), and one in October 1944 (2 victims). A number of these interactions were reprisals precipitated by the killing of German soldiers by partisans, including in one case the execution of a German prisoner.

== Orders of Battle ==
=== 65. Infanterie-Division 1942 ===
- Infanterie-Regiment 145 (three battalions)
- Infanterie-Regiment 146 (three battalions)
- Panzerjäger- und Aufklärungs-Abteilung 165
- Artillerie-Regiment 165
- Pionier-Battalion 165
- Divisions-Nachrichten-Abteilung 165
- Divisions-Nachschubführer 165

=== 65. Infanterie-Division 1944 ===
- Grenadier-Regiment 145 (two battalions)
- Grenadier-Regiment 146 (two battalions)
- Grenadier-Regiment 147 (two battalions)
- Divisions-Füsilier-Battalion 65
- Panzerjäger-Abteilung 165
- Artillerie-Regiment 165
- Feldersatz-Battalion 165
- Pionier-Battalion 165
- Divisions-Nachrichten-Abteilung 165
- Divisions-Nachschubführer 165

Panzerjäger Abteilung 165 fielded 12 7.5 cm PaK 40 antitank guns and 9 Marder III self-propelled guns. In January 1944 the towed anti-tank guns were replaced with Italian built StuG M42 self-propelled guns. In January 1945 the M42s were replaced with Jagdpanzer 38 self-propelled guns. The 1st Company of the battalion was also designated Jagdpanzer Kompanie 1165 from January 1945.

== Commanding officers ==
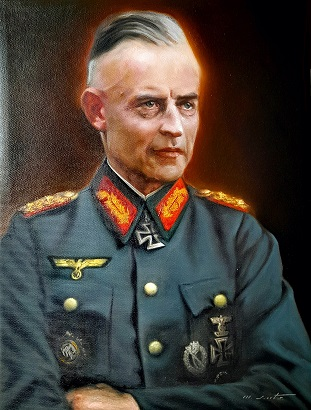
Generalleutnant Pfeifer

- Generalleutnant Hans Bömers, 10 July 1942 – 1 January 1943
- Generalleutnant Wilhelm Rupprecht, 1 January 1943 – 31 May 1943
- Generalleutnant Gustav Heistermann von Ziehlberg, 31 May 1943 – 1 December 1943
- Generalleutnant Hellmuth Pfeifer, 1 December 1943 – 22 April 1945

Generalmajor von Ziehlberg was wounded in an Allied air raid in late November 1943, losing his left arm. He moved to the Eastern Front following his recovery, commanded the 28th Jäger Division, and was arrested and executed for complicity with the July 1944 assassination attempt on Hitler. Generalmajor Hellmuth Pfeifer took command of the division in December 1943. Aged fifty, he had commanded a division on the Eastern Front and was described in the divisional history as having "indomitable energy" and of being a "military role model." Unusually for a General, he wore the Infantry Assault Badge, and he changed the division's tactical insignia from the letter Z to a stylized hand grenade, insignia which it retained for the rest of the war. Pfeifer was killed a few days before the surrender of German forces in Italy on 2 May 1945.

== Award recipients ==
=== Oakleaves to the Knight's Cross of the Iron Cross ===
- Oberst Martin Strahammer, Commander, Grenadier Regiment 146 (11 Aug 1944)
- Generalleutnant Helmuth Pfeifer, Commander, 65th Infantry Division (5 Sep 1944)

=== Knight's Cross of the Iron Cross ===
- Leutnant Heinrich Wunn, 7th Company, Grenadier Regiment 147 (11 Jun 1944)
- Gefreiter Johann Vetter, 14th (Anti-Tank) Company, Grenadier Regiment 147 (15 Jun 1944)
- Oberleutnant Wilhelm Finkbeiner, 14th (Anti-Tank) Company, Grenadier Regiment 147 (20 Jul 1944)

=== Honour Roll Clasp of the German Army ===
- Oberst i.G. Kühl, Commander, Grenadier Regiment 145 (unknown)
- Unteroffizier Gerhard Kroczewski, 14th (Anti-Tank) Company, Grenadier Regiment 147 (15 Dec 1944)
- Hauptmann Siegfried Kurzweg, Commander, 1st Battalion, Grenadier Regiment 147 (17 Dec 1944)

=== German Cross in Gold ===
Seventeen soldiers of the division were awarded the German Cross in Gold.

== Other notable members ==
Dietrich Fischer-Dieskau served in the 65th Infantry Division after being drafted and serving on the Eastern Front. He reportedly sang for his comrades of Grenadier Regiment 146 at entertainment evenings behind the lines. He was captured by U.S. troops in 1945.

== Divisional insignia ==
The division adopted a kugelbaum (Ball Tree) insignia for use on vehicles, road signs, etc. When General von Ziehlberg took command in mid-1943, he changed the divisional insignia to the letter 'Z' (the first letter of his own last name). After von Ziehlberg was seriously wounded during the fighting on the Sangro River, the division adopted a hand grenade as its divisional emblem.

== Newsletter ==
The Divisional newsletter was named Die Handgranate ("The Hand Grenade"). For Christmas 1944 large quantities of a special holiday edition were printed with the idea that they should be sent back to families at home. The edition contained ruminations on the war and a short report "From the War History of our Infantry Division."

== Cultural Depictions ==
The counterattacks by the 65th Infantry Division on the Campoleone Salient in early February 1944 are depicted in the board wargame "A Raging Storm", part of the Tactical Combat Series.

The 65th Division is mentioned by name in a screen title in the film Miracle at St. Anna.

== Published Histories ==
- Dorosh, Michael A. Indescribable Ordeal: The History of the German 65th Infantry Division 1942-1945 (handgrenadedivision.com, 2021) ISBN 978-1-6780-7776-1
- Velten, Wilhelm Vom Kugelbaum zur Handgranate: Der Weg der 65. Infanterie Division (Kurt Vowinckel Verlag, 1974) no ISBN

== See also ==
- Hand Grenade Division website
