= Kuno-Hans von Both =

Nazi general (1884–1955)

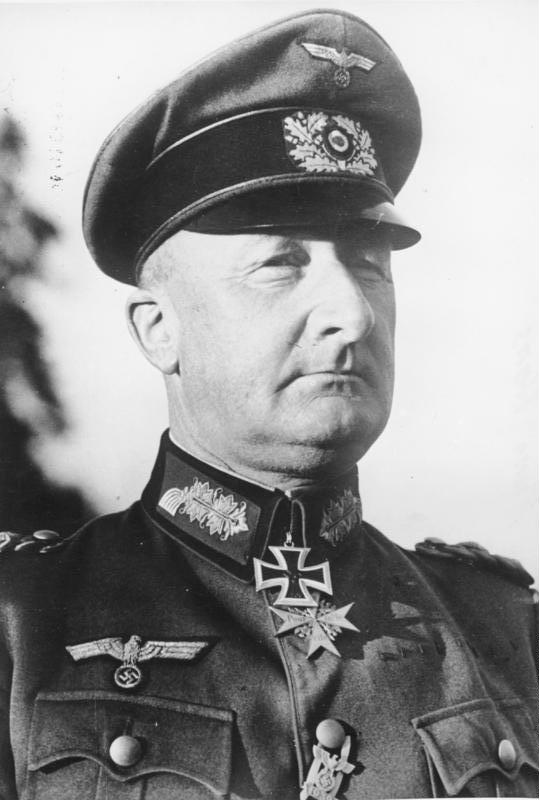
- Both in 1941
- Born: 9 April 1884; Saverne, Alsace-Lorraine, German Empire
- Died: 22 May 1955 (aged 71); Ehlen, Habichtswald, Hesse, West Germany
- Military career
- Allegiance: German Empire; Weimar Republic; Nazi Germany
- Branch: German Army
- Service years: 1903–1945
- Rank: General der Infanterie
- Commands: 21st Infantry Division; I Army Corps; Army Group North Rear Area
- Conflicts: World War I; World War II; Invasion of Poland; Battle of the Netherlands; Battle of Belgium; Battle of France; Operation Barbarossa; Siege of Leningrad
- Awards: Pour le Mérite; Knight's Cross of the Iron Cross

Kuno-Hans von Both (9 April 1884 – 22 May 1955) was a German general during World War II. He was a recipient of both the Pour le Mérite of the German Empire and the Knight's Cross of the Iron Cross of Nazi Germany. He was also awarded the Nazi Party Blood Order by Adolf Hitler for his participation in Nazi activities prior to Adolf Hitler's rise to power.

== Awards and decorations ==
- Order of Franz Joseph (Austria-Hungary, 27 January 1911)
- Lippe House Order, 4th class (18 June 1914)
- Iron Cross 2nd Class (22 September 1914) & 1st Class (9 February 1915)
- Knight's Cross of the Royal House Order of Hohenzollern 3rd Class with Swords (23 December 1917)
- Military Merit Order, 4th class with Swords (Bavaria) (27 June 1918)
- Pour le Mérite (10 April 1918)
- Honour Cross of the World War 1914/1918 (20 December 1934)
- Clasp to the Iron Cross 2nd Class & 1st Class (September 1939)
- German Cross in Gold on 9 September 1942 as General der Infanterie and commander of I. Armeekorps
- Knight's Cross of the Iron Cross on 9 July 1941 as General der Infanterie and commander of I. Armeekorps

Military offices
Preceded by Generalleutnant Albert Wodrig	Commander of 21. Infanterie-Division; 10 November 1938 – 20 October 1939	Succeeded by Generalleutnant Otto Sponheimer
Preceded by General der Artillerie Walter Petzel	Commander of I. Armeekorps; 26 October 1939 – 1 April 1943	Succeeded by General der Kavallerie Philipp Kleffel
