= Gustav Heistermann von Ziehlberg =

Gustav Dietrich Adolf Heistermann von Ziehlberg
- Born: 10 December 1898; Hohensalza, German Empire
- Died: 2 February 1945 (aged 46); Charlottenburg, Berlin, Nazi Germany
- Cause of death: Execution by firing squad
- Military career
- Allegiance: German Empire; Weimar Republic; Nazi Germany
- Branch: Wehrmacht
- Service years: 1914–1945
- Rank: Generalleutnant
- Commands: 65th Infantry Division; 28th Jäger Division
- Conflicts: World War I; World War II; Demyansk Pocket; Italian Campaign; Operation Bagration; Bobruysk Offensive; Belostock Offensive; Osovets Offensive
- Awards: Knight's Cross of the Iron Cross

Gustav Heistermann von Ziehlberg (10 December 1898 – 2 February 1945) was a war criminal and a general in the Wehrmacht during World War II. He was a recipient of the Knight's Cross of the Iron Cross. Convicted in connection with the 20 July plot, he was sentenced to death and executed by firing squad. Von Ziehlberg was married to Anneliese von Tschischewitz, with whom he had four daughters and two sons.

Whilst commanding the 65th Infantry Division in Italy, von Ziehlberg ordered the illegal executions of four SAS men: Captain Patrick Dudgeon, Sergeant William Foster, Corporal James Shortall, and Gunner Bernard Brunt, between September and October 1943. He took 34 Italian civilians hostage and requested permission to execute them in reprisal for suspected partisan attacks. The request was denied by Erwin Rommel. Von Ziehlberg fought on the Eastern Front in 1944.

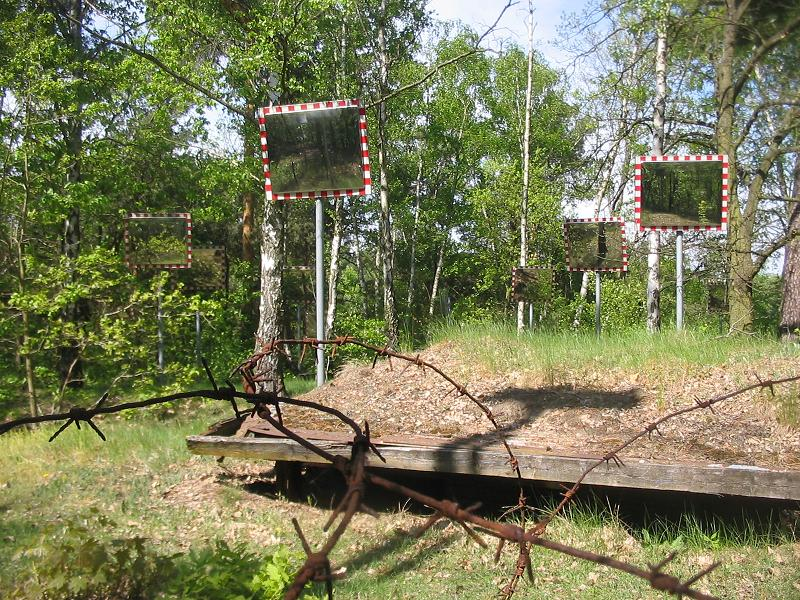
Firing grounds and memorial in Berlin

On 20 July 1944, von Ziehlberg was ordered to arrest his Ia staff officer Major Joachim Kuhn for his involvement in the 20 July plot. Kuhn together with his friend Lieutenant Albrecht von Hagen had arranged for the explosive delivered by Helmuth Stieff to Claus von Stauffenberg. On 21 July he had accompanied General Henning von Tresckow to the front near Królowy Most, where Tresckow committed suicide. Confronted with the warrant, Kuhn denied any entanglement. Instead of arresting him, von Ziehlberg told Kuhn to transfer his official duties and proceed to Berlin in order to clear things up. Kuhn used that opportunity to flee towards the forces of the Soviet 2nd Belorussian Front. He was taken prisoner and interrogated by the SMERSH counter-intelligence agency.

Von Ziehlberg was charged with negligent disobedience. In September 1944, he was sentenced to nine months in prison by the Reichskriegsgericht, but was pardoned for his previous service. He returned to his division, but was again summoned to Berlin on 30 October. Hitler, suspecting him of collaboration with Generaloberst Ludwig Beck, revoked his sentence and had von Ziehlberg re-arrested to face another trial. On 21 November he was sentenced to death by the Reichskriegsgericht, dishonourably discharged, and stripped of all honors, ranks and titles. The judges openly stated that they had to follow the Führer's instructions.

Ziehlberg was executed on 2 February 1945 by a Wehrmacht firing squad at a proving ground near Olympic Stadium in the Charlottenburg (present-day Westend) district of Berlin.

== Awards ==
- Knight's Cross of the Iron Cross on 27 July 1944 as Generalleutnant and commander of 28. Jäger-Division

== Notes ==
=== Bibliography ===
- Fellgiebel, Walther-Peer (2000) [1986]. Die Träger des Ritterkreuzes des Eisernen Kreuzes 1939–1945 — Die Inhaber der höchsten Auszeichnung des Zweiten Weltkrieges aller Wehrmachtteile [The Bearers of the Knight's Cross of the Iron Cross 1939–1945 — The Owners of the Highest Award of the Second World War of all Wehrmacht Branches] (in German). Friedberg, Germany: Podzun-Pallas. ISBN 978-3-7909-0284-6.
- Lett, Brian (2011). SAS in Tuscany 1943 - 1945. Pen & Sword Books Ltd. pp. Chapters 5–8. ISBN 978-1-84884-446-9.

Military offices
Preceded by Generalleutnant Wilhelm Rupprecht	Commander of 65. Infanterie-Division; 31 May 1943 – 1 December 1943	Succeeded by Generalleutnant Hellmuth Pfeifer
Preceded by General der Infanterie Hans Speth	Commander of 28. Jäger-Division; 28 April 1944 – 19 November 1944	Succeeded by Generalmajor Ernst König
