= Gerhard Matzky =

WW2 German army general (1894-1983)

- Born: 19 March 1894; Küstrin, Prussia
- Died: 9 June 1983 (aged 89); Bad Godesberg, Germany
- Military career
- Allegiance: German Empire; Weimar Republic; Nazi Germany; West Germany
- Branch: Imperial German Army; Reichswehr; German Army (Wehrmacht); Bundeswehr
- Service years: 1912–1945; 1956–1960
- Rank: General der Infanterie; Generalleutnant
- Commands: 21st Infantry Division; XXVIII Army Corps; XXVI Army Corps
- Conflicts: World War I; World War II; Siege of Leningrad; East Prussian Offensive; Zemland Offensive
- Awards: Order of Merit of the Federal Republic of Germany; Knight's Cross of the Iron Cross
- Other work: Bundeswehr; Chairman of the Association of German soldiers

Gerhard Matzky (19 March 1894 – 9 June 1983) was a German general during World War II who commanded several corps. He was a recipient of the Knight's Cross of the Iron Cross of Nazi Germany. Matzky joined the Bundeswehr in 1956 and served until 1960.

Matzky was born in 1894 and entered the Royal Prussian Army in 1912. He fought in World War I and was an Oberleutnant in Infantry Regiment 63 at the end of the war. He remained in the Reichswehr as a career officer. As an Oberst, he was the German military attaché to Japan from 1938 to 1940. He was posted to the staff of OKH until January 1943, when he became commander of the 21st Infantry Division. He next led the XXVIII Army Corps in March 1944 and the XXVI Army Corps from July 1944 until Germany's surrender in May 1945.

== Awards and decorations ==
- Iron Cross of 1914 2nd Class & 1st Class (1915)
- Hanseatic Cross of Hamburg
- Cross for Merit in War of Saxe-Meningen
- Wound Badge in silver
- Honour Cross of the World War 1914/1918
- Iron Cross of 1939 2nd Class & 1st Class
- War Merit Cross, 1st and 2nd class with swords
- Knight's Cross of the Iron Cross on 5 April 1944 as Generalleutnant and commander of 21. Infanterie-Division
- Grand Merit Cross with Star of the Federal Republic of Germany (April 1967); previously Cross of Merit (1960)

Military offices
Preceded by ???	German Military Attaché to Japan; 15 September 1938 – 30 November 1940	Succeeded by Oberst Alfred Kretschmer
Preceded by Generalleutnant Otto Sponheimer	Commander of 21. Infanterie-Division; 10 January 1943 - 1 October 1943	Succeeded by Oberst Hubertus Lamey
Preceded by Oberst Hubertus Lamey	Commander of 21. Infanterie-Division; December 1943 - 1 March 1944	Succeeded by Generalmajor Franz Sensfuß
Preceded by General der Artillerie Herbert Loch	Commander of XXVIII. Armeekorps; 28 March 1944 - 20 May 1944	Succeeded by General der Infanterie Hans Gollnick
Preceded by General der Infanterie Anton Grasser	Commander of XXVI. Armeekorps; 6 July 1944 - Surrender	Succeeded by none
