= Nietków =

- Village
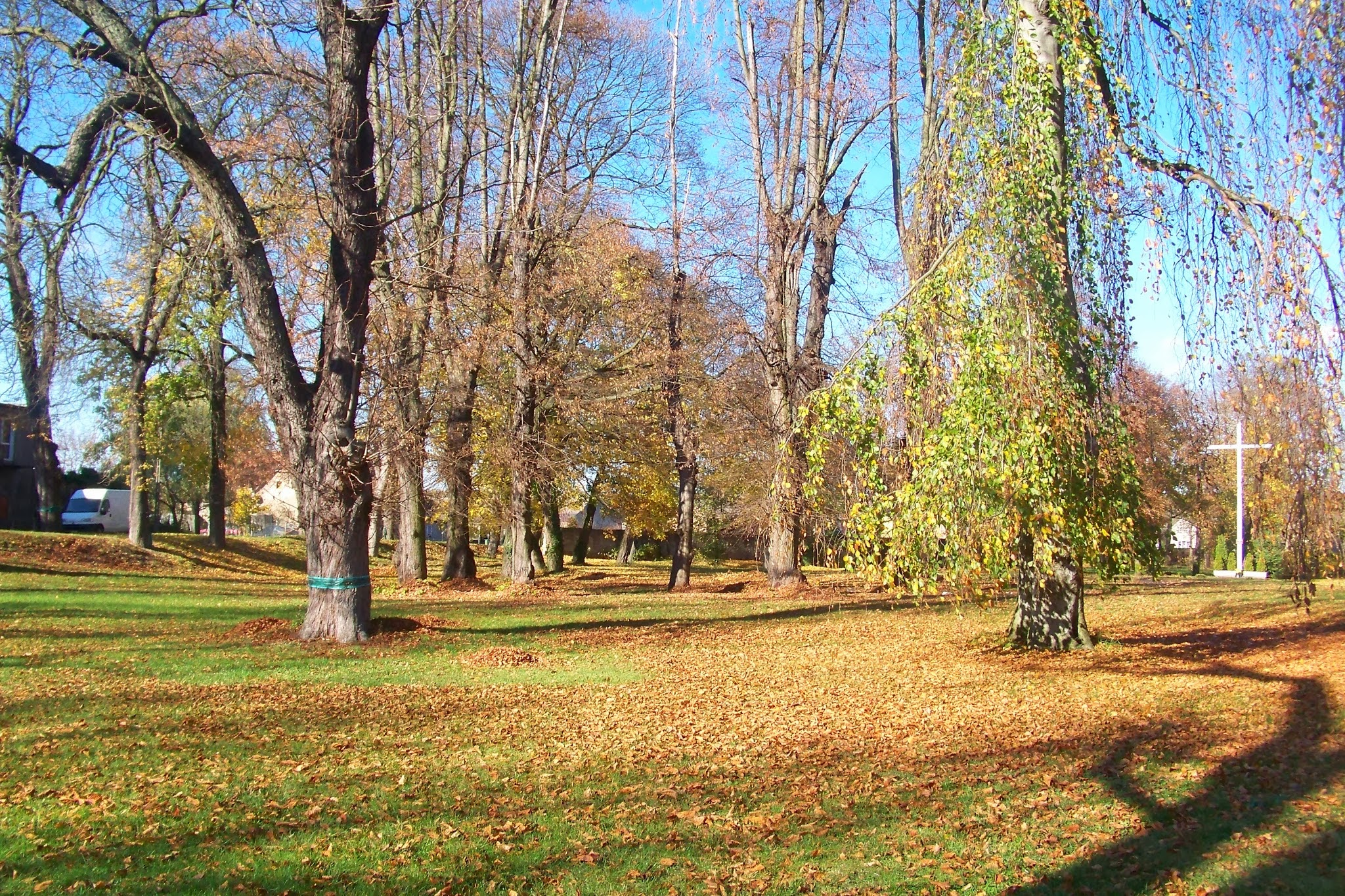
- Park in Nietków

- Location within Poland
- Coordinates: 52°12′N 15°26′E
- Country: Poland
- Voivodeship: Lubusz
- County: Zielona Góra
- Gmina: Czerwieńsk

Population
  - Total: 1,302
- Time zone: UTC+1 (CET)
  - Summer (DST): UTC+2 (CEST)
- Postal code: 66-017
- Area code: +48 68
- Vehicle registration: FZI

Nietków [ˈɲɛtkuf] is a village in the administrative district of Gmina Czerwieńsk, within Zielona Góra County, Lubusz Voivodeship, in western Poland, about 4 kilometres west of the town Czerwieńsk.

== History ==
While part of Medieval Poland, in the early 14th-century Liber fundationis episcopatus Vratislaviensis the village appeared under the Latinized name Necka. Its name probably comes from the slavic word niecka. In the following centuries it was known as Nietków Polski and under the Germanized name of Polnisch Nettkau, later written Polnisch Nettkow.

From 1482 onwards, Polnisch Nettkow became a permanent part of the Electorate of Brandenburg within the Holy Roman Empire of the German Nation. Between 1871 and 1945 it was part of the German Reich, and was renamed Schlesisch Nettkow on 2 June 1920.

Nietków has a historic church of the Ascension of Jesus and a park dating back to the 18th century.

=== Deutsch Nettkow ===
Polnisch Nettkow (Kreis Grünberg, Province of Silesia) must not be confused with Deutsch Nettkow (Kreis Crossen, Province of Brandenburg). The two village centers were located approximately 4.5 kilometers apart (as the crow flies). Deutsch Nettkow lies north of the Oder, while Polnisch (Schlesisch) Nettkow is situated about 4.5 km south-southwest of it, on the opposite side of the river.

Both "Polnisch Nettkow" (documented as a Rothenburg possession since 1398) and "Deutsch Nettkow" featured a large manor estate owned by the Counts of Rothenburg (according to the Heimatkreis Crossen/Oder records, it finally belonged to Friedrich Wilhelm Karl and later Friedrich Wilhelm Konstantin Graf von Rothenburg).

=== Post-WWII ===
In 1945, the German population was expelled and German monuments were torn down. Since then, simply as Nietków, it is part of Poland. The village was affected by the 1997 Central European flood.

== Notable residents ==
- Friedrich Rudolf von Rothenburg (1710–1751), Prussian general
- Friedrich Schulz (1897–1976), Wehrmacht general
