= Major (Germany) =

Lowest staff officer rank in the German Army

- Army and Air Force insignia
- Country: Germany
- Service branch: German Army; German Air Force
- Abbreviation: Maj
- NATO rank code: OF-3
- Pay grade: A13
- Formation: 1956 (current)
- Next higher rank: Oberstleutnant
- Next lower rank: Hauptmann
- Equivalent ranks: Korvettenkapitän

Major (German pronunciation: [maˈjoːɐ]) is the lowest staff officer rank in the German Army, German Air Force. The rank is rated OF-3 in NATO. The rank insignia is a silver oakleaf cluster with a silver pip (star).

The equivalent of the German Navy is the Korvettenkapitän.

== History ==
The rank in German-speaking armed forces dates back to the Middle Ages.

=== World War II ===
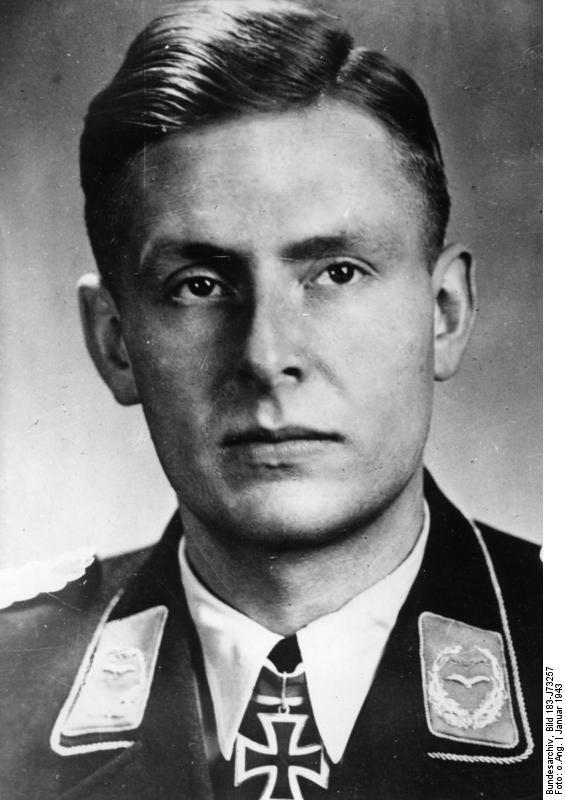
Major Helmut Viedebantt (1943)

During World War II, the SS equivalent was Sturmbannführer.

== Current rules ==
To be appointed to the rank of major, the officer has to pass a staff officer basic course (Stabsoffizierlehrgang) which is held at the German Armed Forces Command and Staff College (Führungsakademie der Bundeswehr), and serve in a post coded A13 or A13/A14.

In the German Army and the Joint Support Service (Streitkräftebasis), the waiting period between meeting the requirements for promotion and actual promotion to the rank of major averages 15 months due to budget problems (as of July 2010).

== See also ==
- Ranks of the German Bundeswehr
- Rank insignia of the German Bundeswehr
- Military ranks of East Germany
- Comparative military ranks of World War I
- Comparative military ranks of World War II
