= Czerwieńsk =

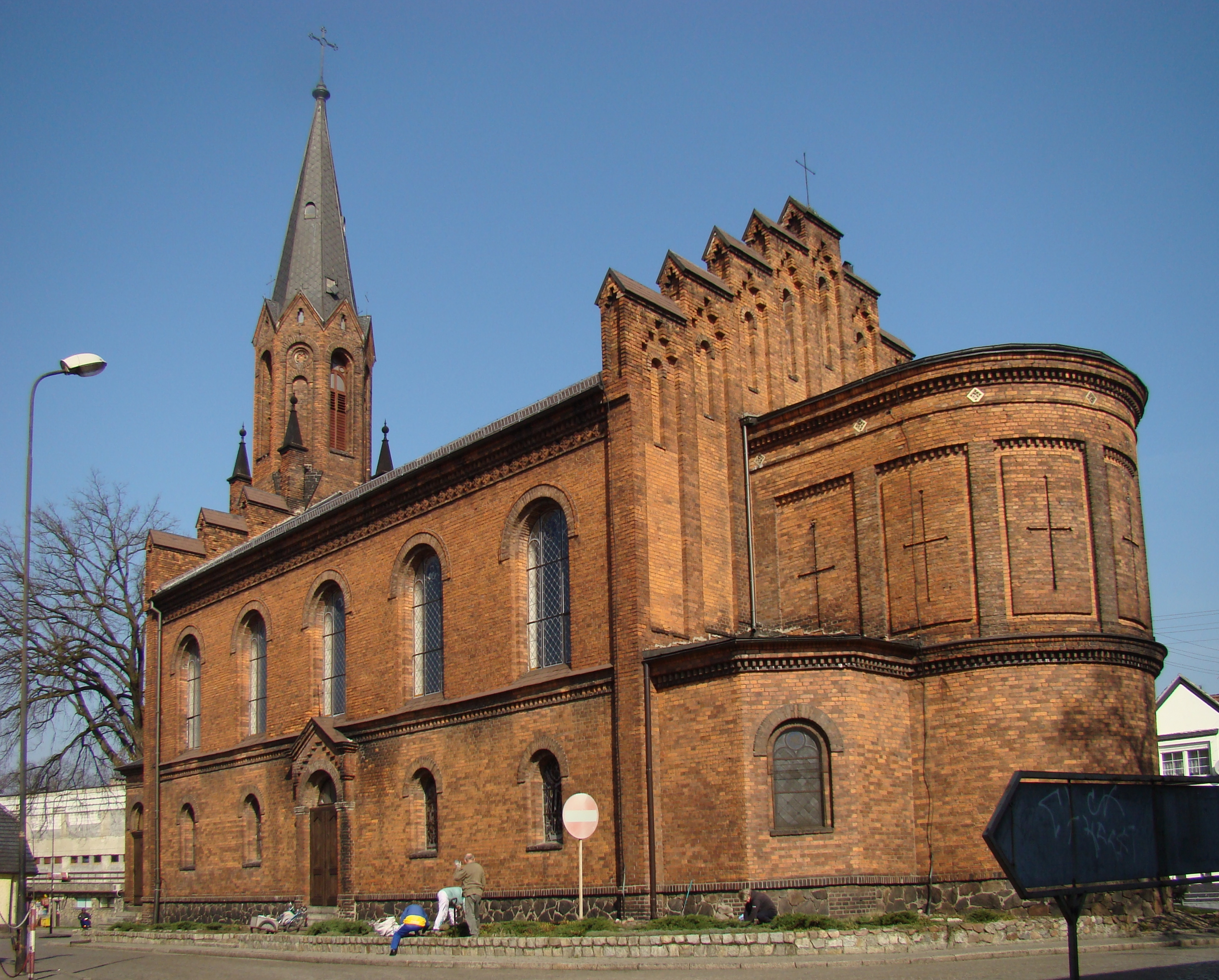
- Gothic Revival Saint Adalbert church

- Flag Coat of arms

- Location within Poland
- Coordinates: 52°0′56″N 15°24′18″E
- Country: Poland
- Voivodeship: Lubusz
- County: Zielona Góra
- Gmina: Czerwieńsk
- Established: 16th century
- Town rights: 1690

Government
  - Mayor: Piotr Iwanus

Area
  - Total: 9.22 km^{2} (3.56 sq mi)

Population (31 December 2021)
  - Total: 3,900
  - Density: 420/km^{2} (1,100/sq mi)
- Time zone: UTC+1 (CET)
  - Summer (DST): UTC+2 (CEST)
- Postal code: 66-016
- Area code: +48 68
- Vehicle registration: FZI
- Climate: Cfb
- Website: czerwiensk.pl

Czerwieńsk [ˈt͡ʂɛrvʲɛɲsk] (German: Rothenburg an der Oder) is a town in Zielona Góra County, Lubusz Voivodeship, in western Poland, with 3,900 inhabitants as of December 2021. Czerwieńsk is a railroad junction, where the Wrocław – Zielona Góra – Szczecin connection meets the line to Poznań.

== History ==
In the Middle Ages the area was settled by Slavs. It formed part of Poland since its establishment in the 10th century and after the fragmentation of Poland it was part of various duchies ruled by the Polish Piast dynasty, the last being the Duchy of Głogów until 1476. By 1538 the area was part of the Margraviate of Brandenburg. Until 1476 it was part of the historic region of Silesia.

Around 1550 the von Rothenburg family from Nettkowe (Nietków) built a small hunting manor some 5 kilometres from their ancestral home. Soon a small village arose around the manor, known as Neu Netkau - "New Netkau". The settlement was part of the region of Brandenburg's Neumark region and lay directly at the border with Silesia. While conveniently located at the crossing of important trading routes, the village's growth was halted by the devastating Thirty Years' War. In 1654 a Lutheran church was built there. It served both local residents and the Protestant inhabitants of the nearby city of Zielona Góra, then part of the Bohemian (Czech) Kingdom ruled by the Roman Catholic House of Habsburg. The first priest of the new church was Christoph Reiche.

On 24 January 1690 a new town of Rothenburg an der Oder ("Rothenburg on the Oder") was started right next to the village of Neu Netkau. The town received town rights from Frederick III, Elector of Brandenburg and grew rapidly in the 17th century, thanks to numerous draper shops founded there, mostly by Protestant refugees from Silesia. In 1701 the town, as part of Brandenburg-Prussia, became part of the Kingdom of Prussia. In 1707 priest Johannes Reiche, the descendant of Christoph Reiche, started the construction of a new, larger church. In 1736 Alexander Rudolf von Rothenburg was knighted by king Frederick William I of Prussia and received the title of a Count. His son, Friedrich Rudolf von Rothenburg, was among the closest friends of King Frederick the Great.

In 1788 the town was bought by Peter von Biron, the last Duke of Courland, a vassal state of the Polish–Lithuanian Commonwealth, who owned also the nearby town of Żagań. The town became the dowry of his daughter Pauline, who married into the Swabian line of the Hohenzollerns. The family retained control of large parts of the town and its surrounding even after the abolition of feudal ownership in Prussia.

In 1811 the first city plan was prepared. The 1816 administration reform of Prussia officially detached the town from the Province of Brandenburg and attached it to the Province of Silesia, reuniting it with Silesia after 340 years. In mid-19th century another Protestant church was built not far from the town square by a Protestant dissenter Martin Gottfried Julius Schöne. In 1870 the town was connected to the Guben-Zbąszyń railway and a train station was constructed. From 1871 to 1945 the town was part of Germany. In 1877 the old Protestant church was demolished and replaced with a new one, built in then-popular Gothic Revival style. In 1900 the town had 632 inhabitants. By 1908 the village of "Polnisch Nettkow" was incorporated into Rothenburg. The number of inhabitants grew and by 1933 reached 1430 people.

The town survived World War II relatively undamaged, but the manor was destroyed by the Red Army. In 1945, in the aftermath of the war, the town was granted to Poland in accordance to the Potsdam Agreement. The German population of the area was expelled and the town was repopulated with Poles, mainly railwaymen from Greater Poland, refugees from eastern Polish areas annexed by the USSR (notably from Tarnopol and Monasterzyska), and repatriates from the Soviet Union. Renamed initially to Rozborg and then to its modern name, the town was stripped of the town rights, which it received again in 1969. In 1949 a public library was founded in Czerwieńsk.

== Demographics ==
Historical population

Year	Pop.	±%
1900	1,213	—
1910	1,418	+16.9%
1925	1,611	+13.6%
1939	1,396	−13.3%

Year	Pop.	±%
1950	1,318	−5.6%
1960	2,194	+66.5%
2010	4,089	+86.4%

== International relations ==
Czerwieńsk is twinned with:

- Drebkau, Germany
- Rotenburg an der Fulda, Germany
- Rotenburg an der Wümme, Germany
- Rothenburg, Saxony-Anhalt, Germany
- Rothenburg/Oberlausitz, Germany
- Rothenburg ob der Tauber, Germany
- Rothenburg, Lucerne, Switzerland
