= XXVIII Army Corps (Wehrmacht) =

Nazi-era German army corps

XXVIII. Armeekorps
- Active: 20 May 1940 – 25 April 1945
- Country: Nazi Germany
- Branch: Army
- Size: Corps
- Engagements: 06/41 - 06/41 Lithuanian frontier 06/41 - 07/41 Düna River; 07/41 - 09/41 Old Russian frontier 07/41 - 09/41 Advance to Leningrad; 09/41 - 06/42 Leningrad defensive 12/41 - 06/42 Lakes Ilmen and Lagoda; 07/42 - 01/44 Defense of AG North; 01/44 - 04/44 northern Russia; 04/44 - 07/44 Defense of AG North; 08/44 South Estonia; 08/44 - 09/44 Väike Emajõgi - Gauja line 09/44 - 01/45 Memel; 02/45 - 04/45 Samland and Pillau

The XXVIII Army Corps (German designation XXVIII. Armeekorps) was a corps which served in Nazi Germany's Wehrmacht during World War II. The corps was created on May 20, 1940 in Wehrkreis III. During the war, the corps was subordinated to the German 6th, 16th, 18th, and 3rd Panzer Armies. In 1945, the corps was briefly named Armeeabteilung Samland (Corps Task Force Samland). The corps fought in Samland until annihilated in late April 1945.

== Order of battle ==
Following is the organization of the corps when it was part of the Eighteenth Army of Army Group North early in 1944:

=== January 1944 ===
- Commander: General of the Artillery (Germany) Herbert Loch
- 12th Luftwaffe Field Division under Major-General Gottfried Weber
  - 23rd Field Infantry Regiment
  - 24th Field Infantry Regiment
  - 12th Field Artillery Regiment
- 13th Luftwaffe Field Division under Lieutenant-General Helmuth Reymann
  - 25th Field Infantry Regiment
  - 26th Field Infantry Regiment
  - 13th Field Artillery Regiment
- German 21st Infantry Division under Lieutenant-General Gerhard Matzky
  - 3rd Infantry Regiment
  - 24th Infantry Regiment
  - 45th Infantry Regiment
  - 21st Artillery Regiment
- 96th Infantry Division (Germany) under Lieutenant-General Richard Wirtz
  - 283rd Infantry Regiment
  - 284th Infantry Regiment
  - 287th Infantry Regiment
  - 196th Artillery Regiment
- 121.Infanterie-Division under Major-General Helmuth Priess
  - 405th Infantry Regiment
  - 407th Infantry Regiment
  - 408th Infantry Regiment
  - 121st Artillery Regiment

== Commanding officers ==
- General der Infanterie Walter Graf von Brockdorff-Ahlefeldt, 1 June 1940
- General der Artillerie Peter Weyer, 20 June 1940
- General der Infanterie Mauritz von Wiktorin, 25 November 1940
- General der Artillerie Herbert Loch, 27 October 1941
- General der Infanterie Gerhard Matzky, 28 March 1944
- General der Infanterie Hans Gollnick, 20 May 1944

== See also ==
- Battle of Memel
- Battle of Königsberg
- List of German corps in World War II

== Bibliography ==
- Tessin, Georg. Verbände und Truppen der deutschen Wehrmacht und Waffen–SS im Zweiten Weltkrieg 1939–1945 [Units and Troops of the German Military and Waffen-SS in the Second World War 1939–1945] (in German). Vol. 4: Die Landstreitkräfte 15–30 (Ground Units 15–30). Osnabrück: Biblio.

== Sources ==
- Lexikon der Wehrmacht
