= 28th Jäger Division =

28th Infantry Division 28th Jäger Division
- German: 28. Infanterie-Division; 28. Jäger-Division
- Active: 1 October 1936 – May 1945
- Country: Nazi Germany
- Branch: Army
- Type: Infantry
- Role: Light infantry
- Size: Division

The 28th Jäger Division was a German military unit during World War II.

== Background ==
The main purpose of the German Jäger Divisions was to fight in adverse terrain where smaller, coordinated units were more easily combat capable than the brute force offered by the standard infantry divisions. The Jäger divisions were more heavily equipped than mountain divisions, but not as well armed as a larger infantry division. In the early stages of the war, they were the interface divisions fighting in rough terrain and foothills as well as urban areas, between the mountains and the plains. The Jägers (meaning hunters in German) relied on a high degree of training, and slightly superior communications, as well as their considerable artillery support. In the middle stages of the war, as the standard infantry divisions were downsized, the Jäger structure of divisions with two infantry regiments, became the standard table of organization. In 1943, Adolf Hitler declared that all infantry divisions were now Grenadier Divisions except for his elite Jäger and Mountain Jaeger divisions.

== Organisation and history ==
The division was originally formed in October 1936 in Breslau, Silesia, as the 28th Infantry Division (this lineage giving it the divisional nickname of the Eisernes Kreuz Schlesische Division, the 'Iron Cross Silesian Division'). After action in the Crimea, and taking heavy casualties in the siege of Sevastopol, it was reconstituted as the 28th Light Infantry Division in December 1941, and then as the 28th Jäger Division in July 1942, with the following organisation:

- Jäger-Regiment 49
- Jäger-Regiment 83
- Artillerie-Regiment 28
- Feldersatz-Battalion 28
- Pionier-Battalion 28
- Panzerjäger-Abteilung 28
- Aufklärungs-Abteilung 28
- Divisions-Einheiten 28

The 28th Jäger Division fought largely on the Leningrad front, as part of Army Group North. In July 1944 it participated in the unsuccessful attempt to break the encirclement of Fourth Army east of Minsk during Operation Bagration. In late 1944 and early 1945 it fought in East Prussia with the rebuilt Fourth Army, being largely destroyed or captured in the Heiligenbeil Pocket. After absorbing some elements of the destroyed 102nd Infantry Division, the remainder surrendered to the Soviets in Samland.

== Commanding officers ==
=== 28. Infanterie-Division ===
- Generalmajor/Generalleutnant Hans von Obstfelder, 1 October 1936 (creation) – 21 May 1940
- Generalmajor/Generalleutnant Johann Sinnhuber, 21 May 1940 – 1 December 1941 (renaming)

=== 28. leichte Infanterie-Division ===
- Generalleutnant Johann Sinnhuber, 1 December 1941 – 1 July 1942 (renaming)

=== 28. Jäger-Division ===
- Generalleutnant Johann Sinnhuber, 1 July 1942 – 1 May 1943
- Generalmajor/Generalleutnant Friedrich Schulz, 1 May 1943 – 24 November 1943
- Oberst Hubertus Lamey, 25 November 1943 – 15 January 1944
- Generalleutnant Hans Speth, 15 January 1944 – 27 April 1944
- Generalleutnant Gustav Heistermann von Ziehlberg, 28 April 1944 – 19 November 1944
- Oberst/Generalmajor Ernst König, 20 November 1944 – 11 April 1945
- Oberst i.G. Hans Tempelhoff, 12 April 1945 – May 1945
