= Kulakovka =

Kulakovka Кулаковка
- Selo
- Location within Astrakhan Oblast Location within Russia
- Coordinates: 46°19′N 48°04′E
- Country: Russia
- Region: Astrakhan Oblast
- District: Privolzhsky District
- Time zone: UTC+4:00

Kulakovka (Russian: Кулаковка) is a rural locality (a selo) in Tryokhprotoksky Selsoviet, Privolzhsky District, Astrakhan Oblast, Russia. The population was 1,365 as of 2010. There are 20 streets.

== Geography ==
Kulakovka is located 12 km west of Nachalovo (the district's administrative centre) by road. Astrakhan is the nearest rural locality.
