= 1904–05 Swiss Serie A =

Swiss football season

Swiss Serie A
- Season: 1904–05

Statistics of Swiss Super League in the 1904–05 season.

== East ==
Pos	Team	Pld	W	D	L	GF	GA	GD	Pts
1	Grasshopper Club Zürich	10	9	0	1	44	11	+33	18
2	FC St. Gallen	10	7	1	2	25	14	+11	15
3	FC Zürich	10	7	0	3	27	11	+16	14
4	Kickers Zürich	10	3	1	6	21	24	−3	7
5	Blue Stars St. Gallen	10	2	1	7	10	35	−25	5
6	American Wanderers Zürich	10	0	1	9	4	36	−32	1

Source: rsssf

== Central ==
Pos	Team	Pld	W	D	L	GF	GA	GD	Pts
1	Young Boys Bern	8	6	1	1	35	10	+25	13
2	BSC Old Boys Basel	8	6	1	1	27	5	+22	13
3	FC Bern	8	4	2	2	14	12	+2	10
4	FC Basel	8	2	0	6	18	20	−2	4
5	Weissenbühl Bern	8	0	0	8	5	52	−47	0

Source: rsssf

NB: the match FC Basel - Young Boys Bern ended with the final score 3-4. Falsely, however, the result was originally reported as a 4-4 draw. Thus Old Boys would have finished in first position and were nominated as participants for the finals. After the mistake was noticed the W-D-L records and points totals in the league table were corrected and the necessary play-off match was arranged. However, the total goals remained without modification and consequently this leads to the fact that most older sources list the goal records for Young Boys and FC Basel as 35-11 and 19-20 respectively. Obviously this is arithmetically incorrect.

Play-off

Team 1	Score	Team 2
Young Boys	2–1	Old Boys

== West ==
Pos	Team	Pld	W	D	L	GF	GA	GD	Pts
1	FC La Chaux-de-Fonds	8	7	0	1	24	10	+14	14
2	Lausanne Sports	8	7	0	1	31	6	+25	14
3	Servette Genf	8	2	2	4	10	17	−7	6
4	FC Neuchâtel	8	2	0	6	12	18	−6	4
5	FC Genf	8	0	2	6	4	30	−26	2

Source: rsssf

Play-off

Team 1	Score	Team 2
Chaux-de-Fonds	2–1	Lausanne-Sports

== Final ==
=== Table ===
Pos	Team	Pld	W	D	L	GF	GA	GD	Pts
1	Grasshopper Club Zürich	2	2	0	0	4	1	+3	4
2	FC La Chaux-de-Fonds	2	0	1	1	3	4	−1	1
3	Young Boys Bern	2	0	1	1	3	4	−1	1

Source: rsssf

=== Results ===
Team 1	Score	Team 2
2 April 1905
Young Boys	2–2	Chaux-de-Fonds
9 April 1905
Grasshopper	2–1	Chaux-de-Fonds
16 April 1905
Grasshopper	2–1	Young Boys

Grasshopper Club Zürich won the championship.

== Sources ==
- Switzerland 1904-05 at RSSSF
