= 551st Volksgrenadier Division =

German infantry division during WW II

The 551st Volksgrenadier Division (German: 551. Volksgrenadier-Division) was a Volksgrenadier infantry division of the German Army during World War II, active from 1944 to 1945.

The division was established on 11 July 1944 at the Thorn military training area in West Prussia under the designation 551st Sperr-Division. On 19 July 1944 the division was renamed the 551. Grenadier Division. In October, the division was involved in heavy fighting in Lithuania. On 9 October 1944 it was renamed 551. Volksgrenadier Division. Afterwards, the division fought in the Tilsit area of East Prussia and was taken prisoner by the Soviets.

Its commander was Generalleutnant Siegfried Verhein.

== Sources ==
- 551. Grenadier-Division
- 551. Volks-Grenadier-Division
