= Hans Gollnick =

Wehrmacht general

- Born: 22 May 1892
- Died: 15 February 1970 (aged 77)
- Military career
- Allegiance: German Empire; Weimar Republic; Nazi Germany
- Branch: German Army
- Service years: 1913–1945
- Rank: General der Infanterie
- Commands: 36th Infantry Division; XXXXVI Panzer Corps
- Conflicts: World War I; World War II; Charge at Krojanty; Tartu Offensive
- Awards: Knight's Cross of the Iron Cross with Oak Leaves

Hans Gollnick (22 May 1892 – 15 February 1970) was a general in the Wehrmacht of Nazi Germany during World War II. He was a recipient of the Knight's Cross of the Iron Cross with Oak Leaves.

At the beginning of World War II, Gollnick was commander of an infantry regiment in the Charge at Krojanty. During the war, he was awarded the Knight's Cross of the Iron Cross in 1942, and promoted to general in 1943.

== Awards ==
- Iron Cross (1914) 2nd Class (11 October 1914) & 1st Class (24 November 1916)
- Clasp to the Iron Cross (1939) 2nd Class (15 September 1939) & 1st Class (5 October 1939)
- Knight's Cross of the Iron Cross with Oak Leaves
  - Knight's Cross on 21 November 1942 as Generalmajor and commander of the 36. Infanterie-Division (mot.)
  - 282nd Oak Leaves on 24 August 1943 as Generalleutnant and commander of the 36. Panzergrenadier-Division

Military offices
| Preceded by Generalleutnant Otto-Ernst Ottenbacher | Commander of 36. Infanterie-Division; 15 October 1941 – 1 August 1943 | Succeeded by Generalleutnant Rudolf Stegmann |
| Preceded by General der Infanterie Gerhard Matzky | Commander of XXVIII. Armeekorps; 20 May 1944 – 25 April 1945 | Succeeded by none |
