= 21st Infantry Division (Wehrmacht) =

German military unit during WWII

21. Infanterie-Division; German 21st Infantry Division
- Active: 1 October 1934 – 8 May 1945
- Country: Nazi Germany
- Branch: Army
- Type: Infantry
- Size: Division
- Engagements: World War II

The 21st Infantry Division was a German military unit which fought during World War II.

== History ==
The 21st Infantry Division (Germany) was formed in 1934 in Elbing, East Prussia, by expanding the 3rd Prussian Infantry Regiment of the 1st Division of the old Reichswehr. As this was a direct breach of the terms of the Treaty of Versailles, its existence was initially concealed; it was formally designated as the 21st Infantry Division in October 1935. Its East Prussian origin informed the adoption of the divisional symbol, a figure holding a shield bearing the black cross of the Teutonic Knights.

Mobilised in the 1st wave in 1939, the division took part in the German invasion of Poland and the following year's invasion of France. For the next four years, it fought on the Eastern Front, largely as part of Army Group North, assigned to Eighteenth Army.

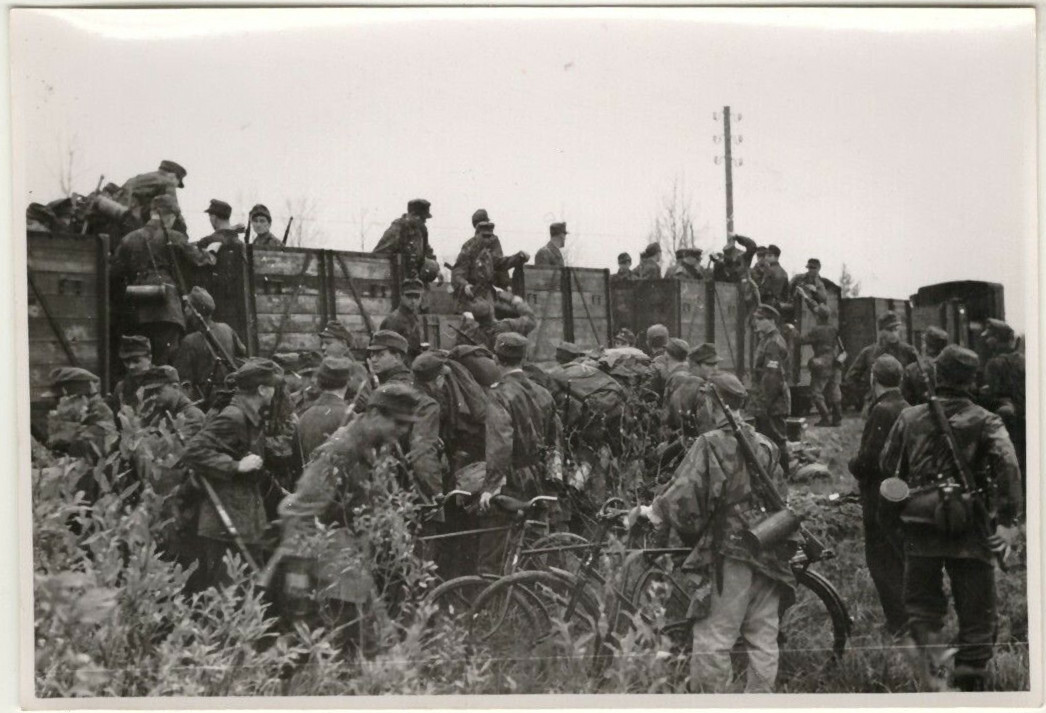
Soldiers of the 21st Infantry Division during a railway operation at the Ostpreußenbahn in the Volkhov sector

After being involved in series of defensive battles and retreats to Riga as the Soviet army conquered their territory, late 1944 saw the 21st Infantry Division again in East Prussia, assigned to Third Panzer Army in the area of Tilsit before being reallocated to Fourth Army and deployed in the area of Insterburg, facing the Soviet East Prussian Offensive. Along with the bulk of Fourth Army it was encircled and largely destroyed in the Heiligenbeil pocket in the closing weeks of the war. Remnants of the division's forces were transported over the Frisches Haff to Pillau and Samland, where the unit was eventually dispersed in battle with Soviet troops, while some elements escaped along the Frische Nehrung to Hela and eventually by sea to Schleswig-Holstein.

== Commanding officers ==
- Generalleutnant Albert Wodrig, 1 October 1934 – 10 November 1938
- Generalleutnant Kuno-Hans von Both, 10 November 1938 – 20 October 1939
- Generalleutnant Otto Sponheimer, 1 November 1939 – April 1942
- Generalleutnant Wilhelm Bohnstedt, April 1942
- Generalleutnant Otto Sponheimer, April 1942 – 10 January 1943
- Generalleutnant Gerhard Matzky, 10 January 1943 – 1 October 1943
- Oberst Hubertus Lamey, 1 October 1943 – 1 December 1943
- Generalleutnant Gerhard Matzky, 1 December 1943 – 1 March 1944
- Generalmajor Franz Sensfuß, 1–28 March 1944
- Generalleutnant Hermann Foertsch, 28 March – 22 August 1944
- Generalmajor Heinrich Götz, 22 August 1944 – 25 September 1944
- Oberst Hengersdorff, 25 September 1944 – October 1944
- Oberst Eberhard Scharenberg, October 1944 – 12 December 1944
- Oberst Friedrich Beyse, 12 December 1944 – 14 January 1945
- Generalmajor Heinrich Götz, 14 January 1945 – 1 April 1945
- Generalmajor Karl Koetz, 1 April 1945 – 8 May 1945

== Organisation ==
- 3. Infanterie-Regiment
- 24. Infanterie-Regiment
- 45. Infanterie-Regiment
- 21. Artillerie-Regiment
- 57. I./Artillerie-Regiment
- 21. Aufklärungs-Abteilung
- 21. Panzerjäger-Abteilung
- 21. Pionier-Battalion
- 21. Nachrichten-Abteilung
- 1. Inf.Div.Nachschubführer
