= Leningrad strategic defensive operation order of battle =

This is the order of battle for the Leningrad Strategic Defensive covering the period 10 July to 30 September 1941.

== Soviet Union ==
=== Fronts and Fleets ===
==== Northern Front ====
The Northern Front was active from 10 July to 23 August 1941 when the command was divided into the Karelian and Leningrad Fronts. Operated in Estonia.

Composition as of 1 July 1941:

23rd Army (Defending the approaches north of Leningrad)
16th Rifle Division
70th Rifle Division
177th Rifle Division
191st Rifle Division
1st Mountain Rifle Brigade
8th Rifle Brigade
Separate Kursantska Rifle Brigade
21st Fortified Region
22nd Fortified Region
573rd Gun Artillery Regiment
519th High-Power Howitzer Artillery Regiment
541st Howitzer Artillery Regiment (RVGK)
577th Howitzer Artillery Regiment (RVGK)
20th Mortar Battalion
47th Mortar Battalion
2nd PVO Corps
Vyborg PVO Brigade Region
Pskov PVO Brigade Region
Luga PVO Brigade Region
Svir PVO Brigade Region
Murmansk PVO Brigade Region
6th Pontoon-Bridge Regiment
12th Engineer Regiment
29th Engineer Regiment
39th Fighter Aviation Division
41st Bomber Aviation Division
1st Mixed Aviation Division
2nd Mixed Aviation Division
3rd Mixed Aviation Division
4th Mixed Aviation Division
5th Mixed Aviation Division
55th Mixed Aviation Division
3rd PVO Fighter Aviation Division
54th PVO Fighter Aviation Division
14th Bomber Aviation Regiment

Composition as of 1 August 1941

8th Army
23rd Army (Defending the approaches north of Leningrad)
Luga Operational Group
Kingisepp Defense Sector
265th Rifle Division
272nd Rifle Division
281st Rifle Division
1st Guards Leningrad People's Militia Division
2nd Guards Leningrad People's Militia Division
3rd Guards Leningrad People's Militia Division
4th Guards Leningrad People's Militia Division
8th Rifle Brigade
22nd Fortified Region
29th Fortified Region
Krasnogvardeisk Fortified Region
2nd PVO Corps
Svir PVO Brigade Region
7th PVO Fighter Aviation Corps

seven Fighter Aviation Regiments

39th Fighter Aviation Division
2nd Bomber Aviation Division
41st Bomber Aviation Division
1st Mixed Aviation Division

==== Leningrad Front ====
The Leningrad Front (Russian: Ленинградский фронт) was first formed on 23 August 1941, by dividing the Northern Front into the Leningrad Front and Karelian Front, during the German approach on Leningrad. The Front participated through the end of the operation. It operated from the Gulf of Finland to Lake Ilmen and in Estonia until 27 August.

Composition on 1 September 1941:

8th Army
23rd Army (Defending the approaches north of Leningrad)
42nd Army
48th Army
55th Army
Kopor Operational Group
Southern Operation Group
10th Rifle Division
16th Rifle Division
115th Rifle Division (minus 708th Rifle Regiment)
4th Guards Leningrad People's Militia Division
1st Rifle Division (NKVD)
8th Rifle Brigade
3rd Rifle Regiment (1st Guards Leningrad People's Militia Division)
22nd Fortified Region
29th Fortified Region
101st Howitzer Artillery Regiment
108th High-Power Artillery Regiment (RVGK)
16th Mortar Battalion
20th Mortar Battalion
27th Antiaircraft Battalion
2nd PVO Corps
Svir PVO Brigade Region
1st Tank Division (minus 24th Tank and 1st Motorized Rifle Regiments)
48th Tank Battalion
53rd Engineer Battalion
54th Engineer Battalion
21st Pontoon-Bridge Battalion
7th PVO Fighter Aviation Corps

eleven Fighter Aviation Regiments

8th Fighter Aviation Division
39th Fighter Aviation Division
2nd Mixed Aviation Division

Composition on 1 October 1941:

8th Army
23rd Army (Defending the approaches north of Leningrad)
42nd Army
54th Army
55th Army
Nevskaya Operational Group
111th Rifle Division
177th Rifle Division
235th Rifle Division
3rd Rifle Brigade
8th Rifle Brigade
9th Rifle Brigade
10th Rifle Brigade
11th Rifle Brigade
290th Fortified Region
108th Howitzer Artillery Regiment (RVGK)
541st Howitzer Artillery Regiment (RVGK)
1st Howitzer Artillery Regiment (- 2nd Battalion)
24th Antitank Artillery Regiment
Mortar Battalion (unnumbered)
53rd Engineer Battalion
54th Engineer Battalion
106th Motorized Engineer Battalion
41st Pontoon-Bridge Battalion
42nd Pontoon-Bridge Battalion
7th PVO Fighter Aviation Corps

five Fighter Aviation Fighter Regiments

2nd Mixed Aviation Division
8th Fighter Aviation Division
39th Fighter Aviation Division
65th Assault Aviation Regiment
175th Assault Aviation Regiment
116th Reconnaissance Squadron
19th Corrective Aviation Squadron
50th Corrective Aviation Squadron
101st Corrective Aviation Squadron
90th Bomber Aviation Division (Headquarters)
91st Mixed Aviation Division (Headquarters)
92nd Aviation Division (Headquarters)

==== Northwestern Front ====
The Northwestern Front was involved in the operation for the entire duration. It operated in the area from Pskov to Novorzhev, then south and southeast of Lake Ilmen.

Composition on 1 July 1941:

8th Army
11th Army
27th Army
29th Rifle Corps

170th Rifle Division

22nd Rifle Corps

180th Rifle Division
182nd Rifle Division

23rd Rifle Division
25th Fortified Region
41st Fortified Region
45th Fortified Region
46th Fortified Region
48th Fortified Region
270th Corps Artillery Regiment
614th Corps Artillery Regiment
615th Corps Artillery Regiment
11th Antiaircraft Artillery Battalion
103rd Antiaircraft Artillery Battalion
247 Antiaircraft Artillery Battalion
10th PVO Brigade
12th PVO Brigade
14th PVO Brigade
Riga PVO Brigade Region
Estonian PVO Brigade Region
Kaunas PVO Brigade Region
21st Mechanized Corps

42nd Tank Division
185th Motorized Division

4th Pontoon-Bridge Regiment
30th Pontoon-Bridge Regiment
6th Mixed Aviation Division
7th Mixed Aviation Division
8th Mixed Aviation Division
57th Mixed Aviation Division

Composition on 1 August 1941:

11th Army
27th Army
Novgorod Operational Group
5th Airborne Corps

9th Airborne Brigade
10th Airborne Brigade
201st Airborne Brigade

41st Cavalry Division (Forming)
9th Antitank Brigade
10th Antitank Brigade
270th Corps Artillery Regiment
448th Corps Artillery Regiment
110th High-Power Howitzer Artillery Regiment
402nd High-Power Howitzer Artillery Regiment
429th High-Power Howitzer Artillery Regiment (RVGK)
11th Antiaircraft Artillery Battalion
19th Antiaircraft Artillery Battalion
10th PVO Brigade
Riga PVO Brigade Region
Estonian PVO Brigade Region
Kaunas PVO Brigade Region
1st Mechanized Corps

3rd Tank Division

12th Mechanized Corps

23rd Tank Division
28th Tank Division
125th Tank Regiment

25th Engineer Battalion
110th Motorized Engineer Battalion
50th Pontoon-Bridge Battalion
55th Pontoon-Bridge Battalion
56th Pontoon-Bridge Battalion
57th Pontoon-Bridge Battalion
4th Mixed Aviation Division
6th Mixed Aviation Division
57th Mixed Aviation Division

Composition on 1 September 1941:

11th Army
27th Army
34th Army
Novgorod Operational Group
33rd Rifle Division
84th Rifle Division
54th Cavalry Division
310th Rifle Division (Under command of the Northwestern direction)
10th Antitank Brigade
402nd High-Power Howitzer Artillery Regiment (RVGK)
429th High-Power Howitzer Artillery Regiment (RVGK)
171st Antitank Artillery Regiment
759th Antitank Artillery Regiment
19th Antiaircraft Artillery Battalion
111th Antiaircraft Artillery Battalion
239th Antiaircraft Artillery Battalion
246th Antiaircraft Artillery Battalion
250th Antiaircraft Artillery Battalion
Riga PVO Brigade Region
Estonian PVO Brigade Region
Kaunas PVO Brigade Region
34th Motorcycle Regiment
25th Engineer Battalion
50th Pontoon-Bridge Battalion
55th Pontoon-Bridge Battalion
56th Pontoon-Bridge Battalion
57th Pontoon-Bridge Battalion
6th Mixed Aviation Division
415th Fighter Aviation Regiment

Composition on 1 October 1941

11th Army
27th Army
34th Army
Novgorod Operational Group
25th Cavalry Division
46th Cavalry Division
54th Cavalry Division
10th Antitank Brigade
171st Antitank Artillery Regiment
759th Antitank Artillery Regiment
3rd Guards Mortar Regiment
Riga PVO Brigade Region
Estonian PVO Brigade Region
Kaunas PVO Brigade Region
11th Antiaircraft Artillery Battalion
29th Antiaircraft Artillery Battalion
239th Antiaircraft Artillery Battalion
246th Antiaircraft Artillery Battalion
250th Antiaircraft Artillery Battalion
125th Tank Brigade
87th Tank Battalion
110th Tank Battalion
112? Tank Battalion (source is unclear)
112? Tank Battalion (source is unclear)
116th Tank Battalion
34th Motorcycle Regiment
57th Pontoon-Bridge Battalion
67th Sapper Battalion
492nd Sapper Battalion
494th Sapper Battalion
6th Mixed Aviation Division

==== Baltic Fleet ====
Battleship squadron

battleship Marat (named after Jean-Paul Marat)
battleship Oktyabrskaya Revolutsiya (named after the October Revolution)
destroyer leader Leningrad (named after the city of Leningrad)
destroyer leader Minsk (named after the capital of Belarus)

1st destroyer division/1 Flotilla

cruiser Kirov
destroyer Gnevny
destroyer Gordy
destroyer Grozyashchiy
destroyer Smetlivyi
destroyer Steregushchiy

2nd destroyer division/2 Flotilla

Serdityy
Silnyi
Stoikiy
Storozhevoy

3rd destroyer division/3 Flotilla

Karl Marx
Volodarsky
Lenin
Yakov Sverdlov
Artyom
Engels
Kalinin

Guard division/Naval Guards Squadron

Burya
Sneg
Taifun
Tsiklon
Tucha
Vihr

Minesweeper Task Group

Minesweepers T201, T202, T203, T204, T205, T206, T207, T208, T209, T210, T211, T212, T213, T214, T215, T216, T217 and T218
15 auxiliary minesweepers

1st submarine brigade/1 Submarine Battle Fleet

S1, S3, S4, S5, S6, S7, S8, S9, S10, S101, S102, L3, M71, M77, M78, M79, M80, M81, M83, ex-Estonian submarine Lembit, ex-Estonian submarine Kalev, ex-Latvian submarine Ronis, ex-Latvian submarine Spidola

2nd submarine brigade/2 Submarine Battle Fleet

SC309, SC310, SC311, SC317, SC318, SC319, SC320, SC322, SC323, SC324, M90, M94, M95, M96, M97, M98, M99, M102, M103

Support vessels

Polyarnaya Zvezda (Polar Star)
Oka (named after the river of Oka)

Training Task Group of the Navy

M72, M73, M74, M75, M76, SC303, SC304, K3, K21, K22, K23, L1, L2, S11, S12, SC405, SC406

Training Task Group

SC301, SC302, SC305, SC306, SC307, SC308, P1, P2, P3

=== Red Army ===
==== 8th Army ====
The 8th Army was involved in the operation for the entire period. First operating in Estonia, then divided into two parts, one the Tallinn area and the other in the Narva - Kingisepp, the army ended the operation in the area which would become the Oranienbaum Bridgehead.
6 commanders between 22 June - 30 September 1941.

Composition on 1 July 1941:

10th Rifle Corps

10th Rifle Division
11th Rifle Division

11th Rifle Corps

48th Rifle Division
125th Rifle Division

65th Rifle Corps (Headquarters)
22nd Rifle Division (NKVD)
44th Fortified Region
9th Antitank Brigade
47th Corps Artillery Regiment
51st Corps Artillery Regiment
73rd Corps Artillery Regiment
39th Antiaircraft Artillery Battalion
242nd Antiaircraft Artillery Battalion
12th Mechanized Corps

23rd Tank Division
28th Tank Division

3rd Mechanized Corps

2nd Tank Division
5th Tank Division
84th Motorized Division

29th Sapper Battalion

Composition on 1 August 1941:

10th Rifle Corps

10th Rifle Division
11th Rifle Division

11th Rifle Corps

16th Rifle Division
48th Rifle Division
125th Rifle Division

48th Rifle Division
268th Rifle Division
22nd Rifle Division (NKVD)
47th Corps Artillery Regiment
51st Corps Artillery Regiment
73rd Corps Artillery Regiment
39th Antiaircraft Artillery Battalion
103rd Antiaircraft Artillery Battalion
29th Sapper Battalion
80th Sapper Battalion

Composition on 1 September 1941:

11th Rifle Division
48th Rifle Division
118th Rifle Division
125th Rifle Division
191st Rifle Division (minus 522nd Rifle Regiment)
268th Rifle Division
76th Latvian Separate Rifle Regiment
266th Machine-Gun Artillery Battalion
47th Corps Artillery Regiment
73rd Corps Artillery Regiment
1/24th Corps Artillery Regiment
39th Antiaircraft Artillery Battalion
103rd Antiaircraft Artillery Battalion

Composition on 1 October 1941:

19th Rifle Corps

10th Rifle Division
11th Rifle Division
85th Rifle Division

48th Rifle Division
80th Rifle Division
191st Rifle Division
281st Rifle Division
2nd Naval Infantry Brigade
76th Latvian Separate Rifle Regiment
519th Howitzer Artillery Regiment (RVGK)
2nd Battalion, 1st Howitzer Artillery Regiment
39th Antiaircraft Artillery Battalion
103rd Antiaircraft Artillery Battalion
251st Antiaircraft Artillery Battalion
2nd Separate Tank Regiment
Separate Armored Train Battalion
112th Sapper Battalion
295th Sapper Battalion
65th Corrective Aviation Squadron

==== 11th Army ====
The 11th Army was involved in the operation for the entire period. It led the defense of the areas west and southwest of the Lake Ilmen retreating to the area south and then southeast of the lake.
Commander : Vasili Morozov

Composition on 1 July 1941:

16th Rifle Corps

5th Rifle Division
33rd Rifle Division
188th Rifle Division

41st Rifle Corps

111th Rifle Division
118th Rifle Division
235th Rifle Division

90th Rifle Division
126th Rifle Division
128th Rifle Division
42nd Fortified Region
10th Antitank Brigade
448th Corps Artillery Regiment
110th High-Power Howitzer Artillery Regiment
429th Howitzer Artillery Regiment (RVGK)
19th Antiaircraft Battalion
1st Mechanized Corps

3rd Tank Division
163rd Motorized Division
5th Motorcycle Regiment

202nd Motorized Division
38th Engineer Battalion

Composition on 1 August 1941:

22nd Rifle Corps

180th Rifle Division
182nd Rifle Division
254th Rifle Division

24th Rifle Corps

181st Rifle Division
183rd Rifle Division

398th Rifle Regiment (118th Rifle Division)
21st Motorized Rifle Regiment
28th Motorized Rifle Regiment
264th Corps Artillery Regiment
613th Corps Artillery Regiment
614th Corps Artillery Regiment
698th Antitank Artillery Regiment
Separate Antitank Artillery Regiment (Major Bogdanov)
111th Antiaircraft Artillery Battalion
202nd Motorized Division
163rd Motorized Division
5th Motorcycle Regiment
41st Tank Battalion
28th Engineer Battalion
38th Engineer Battalion

Composition on 1 September 1941:

180th Rifle Division
182nd Rifle Division
183rd Rifle Division
202nd Rifle Division
254th Rifle Division
21st Motorized Rifle Regiment
9th Antitank Brigade
614th Corps Artillery Regiment
698th Corps Artillery Regiment
11th Antiaircraft Artillery Battalion
23rd Antiaircraft Artillery Battalion
87th Tank Battalion
110th Tank Battalion
28th Engineer Battalion
38th Engineer Battalion
202nd Sapper Battalion
7th Mixed Aviation Division

Composition on 1 October 1941:

26th Rifle Division
84th Rifle Division
182nd Rifle Division
202nd Rifle Division
254th Rifle Division
28th Motorized Rifle Regiment
614th Corps Artillery Regiment
698th Antitank Artillery Regiment
23rd Antiaircraft Artillery Battalion
8th Tank Brigade
28th Engineer Battalion
38th Engineer Battalion
202nd Sapper Battalion
57th Mixed Aviation Division

==== 27th Army ====
The 27th Army was involved in the operation for the entire period. Led the defense in the area from Slavkovichi - Novorzhev, retreating towards Kholm and then further to the north shore of Lake Seliger.
Commander : Nikolai Berzarin

Composition on 1 July 1941:

24th Rifle Corps

181st Rifle Division
183rd Rifle Division

67th Rifle Division
3rd Rifle Brigade
5th Airborne Corps

9th Airborne Brigade
10th Airborne Brigade
201st Airborne Brigade

613th Corps Artillery Regiment
402nd High-Power Howitzer Artillery Regiment (RVGK)
111th Antiaircraft Battalion
25th Engineer Regiment

Composition on 1 August 1941:

65th Rifle Corps

5th Rifle Division
23rd Rifle Division
33rd Rifle Division
188th Rifle Division

84th Rifle Division
21st Mechanized Corps

42nd Tank Division
46th Tank Division
185th Motorized Division

160th Sapper Battalion
238th Sapper Battalion
239th Sapper Battalion

Composition on 1 September 1941:

5th Rifle Division
23rd Rifle Division
181st Rifle Division
185th Rifle Division
188th Rifle Division
256th Rifle Division
37th Rifle Regiment (NKVD)
613th Corps Artillery Regiment
134th Motorized Engineer Battalion
67th Sapper Battalion
160th Sapper Battalion
188th Sapper Battalion
339th Sapper Battalion
4th Mixed Aviation Division
28th Fighter Aviation Regiment
268th Fighter Aviation Regiment

Composition on 1 October 1941:

23rd Rifle Division
33rd Rifle Division
181st Rifle Division
183rd Rifle Division
1291st Rifle Regiment (4th Rifle Division)
613th Corps Artillery Regiment
111th Antiaircraft Artillery Battalion
28th Tank Division
110th Motorized Engineer Battalion
134th Motorized Engineer Battalion
67th Sapper Battalion
160th Sapper Battalion
188th Sapper Battalion
491st Sapper Battalion
4th Mixed Aviation Division

==== 34th Army ====
The army's involvement began in early August 1941 near Staraya Russa and to the south. The army eventually retreated to the area east of Demyansk.
Commanders : Kuzma Kachanov until 12 September - Petr Alferev

Composition on 1 September 1941:

163rd Rifle Division
245th Rifle Division
257th Rifle Division
259th Rifle Division
262nd Rifle Division
25th Cavalry Division
3rd Motorized Rifle Regiment
264th Corps Artillery Regiment
270th Corps Artillery Regiment
108th Tank Battalion
112th Tank Battalion
47th Engineer Battalion
238th Sapper Battalion
299th Sapper Battalion
57th Mixed Aviation Division

Composition on 1 October 1941:

163rd Rifle Division
188th Rifle Division
245th Rifle Division (minus 1042nd Rifle Regiment)
257th Rifle Division
259th Rifle Division
262nd Rifle Division
270th Corps Artillery Regiment
429th Howitzer Artillery Regiment (RVGK)
19th Antiaircraft Artillery Battalion
46th Motorcycle Battalion
85th Tank Battalion
103rd Tank Battalion
108th Tank Battalion
238th Sapper Battalion
299th Sapper Battalion
469th Sapper Battalion
7th Mixed Aviation Division

==== 42nd Army ====
The army took part in the operation from 9–30 September 1941. Conducted combat operations in the approaches to Leningrad from the Gulf of Finland to the city of Pushkin.
Commanders : Fedor Sergeevich Ivanov until 15 September - Ivan Fedyuninsky

Composition on 1 September 1941:

2nd Guards Leningrad People's Militia Division
3rd Guards Leningrad People's Militia Division (minus 2nd Rifle Regiment)
Krasnogvardeisk Fortified Region
51st Corps Artillery Regiment
690th Antitank Artillery Regiment
Mixed Artillery Regiment
704th Artillery Regiment (198th Motorized Division)
42nd Pontoon-Bridge Battalion
106th Motorized Engineer Battalion

Composition on 1 October 1941:

13th Rifle Division
44th Rifle Division
56th Rifle Division
189th Rifle Division
21st Rifle Division (NKVD)
6th Naval Infantry Brigade
7th Naval Infantry Brigade
268th Machine-Gun Artillery Battalion
282nd Machine-Gun Artillery Battalion
291st Machine-Gun Artillery Battalion
14th Antitank Brigade
28th Corps Artillery Regiment
47th Corps Artillery Regiment
51st Corps Artillery Regiment
73rd Corps Artillery Regiment
101st Howitzer Artillery Regiment (RVGJ)
704th Artillery Regiment
296th Antitank Artillery Battalion
1st Separate Mortar Battalion
2nd Separate Mortar Battalion
3rd Separate Mortar Battalion
Separate Guards Mortar Battalion
51st Tank Battalion
29th Sapper Battalion
456th Sapper Battalion

==== 48th Army ====
The army was involved in the operation from 10 August to 14 September 1941 when the army was disbanded. The army operated in the area west of the Lake Ilmen.
Commanders : Stepan Akimov until 31 August - Maksim Antoniuk

Composition on 1 September 1941:

128th Rifle Division
311th Rifle Division
1st Mountain Rifle Brigade
170th Separate Cavalry Regiment
531st Howitzer Artillery Regiment (RVGK)
21st Tank Division
109th Motorized Engineer Battalion
12th Sapper Battalion

==== 52nd Separate Army ====
The army was involved in the operation from 26 August to the turn of the Volkhov River north of Novgorod.
Commander : Nikolai Klykov

Composition on 1 September 1941:

267th Rifle Division
285th Rifle Division
288th Rifle Division
292nd Rifle Division
312th Rifle Division
314th Rifle Division
316th Rifle Division
442nd Corps Artillery Regiment
884th Antitank Artillery Regiment

Composition on 1 October 1941:

267th Rifle Division
288th Rifle Division
312th Rifle Division
316th Rifle Division
442nd Corps Artillery Regiment
884th Antitank Artillery Regiment
3rd Motorized Engineer Battalion
4th Motorized Engineer Battalion

==== 54th Army ====
The army was formed on 5 September 1941 with the mission of securing the shores of Lake Ladoga to prevent the Germans from encircling Leningrad. The army participated in the operation to the end.
Commanders : Grigory Kulik until 25 September - Mikhail Khozin
Composition on 1 October 1941:

3rd Guards Rifle Division
4th Guards Rifle Division
128th Rifle Division
286th Rifle Division
294th Rifle Division
310th Rifle Division
1st Mountain Brigade
881st Artillery Regiment (RVGK)
882nd Artillery Regiment (RVGK)
2/5th Guards Mortar Regiment
4/4th Guards Mortar Regiment
21st Tank Division
16th Tank Brigade
122nd Tank Brigade
5th Motorized Engineer Battalion
135th Motorized Engineer Battalion
136th Motorized Engineer Battalion
3rd Reserve Aviation Group

four Fighter Aviation Regiments
three Bomber Aviation Regiment
one Assault Aviation Regiment

==== 55th Army ====
The army was formed on 1 September 1941 and operated in the area from Pushkin to the bend of the Neva River through the end of the operation.
Commander : Ivan Gavrilovich Lazarev

Composition on 1 September 1941:

70th Rifle Division
90th Rifle Division
168th Rifle Division
237th Rifle Division
1st Leningrad People's Militia Division (minus 3rd Rifle Regiment)
4th Leningrad People's Militia Division
2nd Rifle Regiment (3rd Leningrad People's Militia Division)
Slutsk-Kolpino Fortified Region
14th Antitank Brigade
24th Corps Artillery Regiment (minus 1st Battalion)
47th Mortar Battalion
84th Tank Battalion
86th Tank Battalion

Composition on 1 October 1941:

70th Rifle Division
86th Rifle Division
90th Rifle Division
125th Rifle Division
168th Rifle Division
268th Rifle Division
55th Rifle Regiment, 17th Rifle Division
Slutsk-Kolpinsky Fortified Region
24th Corp Artillery Regiment
16th Mortar Battalion
47th Mortar Battalion
84th Tank Battalion
86th Tank Battalion
2nd Sapper Battalion
367th Sapper Battalion

==== Leningrad People's Militia ====
See Leningrad Narodnoe Opolcheniye Army for details on Leningrad's Militia units. In late September 1941 the divisions were incorporated into the Red Army.

=== Operational Groups ===
==== Luga Operational Group/Southern Operational Group ====
Took part in the fighting from mid-July in Luga through 16 September when the group was disbanded in Leningrad.

Composition on 1 August 1941:

41st Rifle Corps

111th Rifle Division
177th Rifle Division
235th Rifle Division

1st Rifle Regiment (3rd Leningrad People's Militia Division)
260th Machine-Gun Artillery Battalion
262nd Machine-Gun Artillery Battalion
541st Howitzer Artillery Regiment (RVGK)
Luga PVO Brigade Region
24th Tank Division
259th Sapper Battalion

Composition on 1 September 1941:

41st Rifle Corps

111th Rifle Division
177th Rifle Division
235th Rifle Division

260th Machine-Gun Artillery Battalion
262nd Machine-Gun Artillery Battalion
274th Machine-Gun Artillery Battalion
Antitank Artillery Regiment (Major Bogdanov)
Luga PVO Brigade Region
24th Tank Division
24th Pontoon-Bridge Battalion
259th Sapper Battalion

==== Kopor Operational Group ====
Composition on 1 September 1941:

1st Guards Leningrad People's Militia Division
2nd Leningrad People's Militia Division
522nd Rifle Regiment (191st Rifle Division)
519th Howitzer Artillery Regiment (RVGK)
24th Tank Regiment (1st Tank Division)
295th Sapper Battalion

==== Neva Operational Group ====
Composition on 1 October 1941:

115th Rifle Division
1st Rifle Division (NKVD)
4th Naval Infantry Brigade
1st Fighter Battalion
4th Fighter Battalion
5th Fighter Battalion
230th Artillery Regiment (71st Rifle Division)
1/577th Howitzer Artillery Regiment
24th Antitank Artillery Battalion
20th Mortar Battalion
107th Tank Battalion
21st Pontoon-Bridge Battalion

==== Novgorod Operational Group ====
Composition on 1 August 1941:

16th Rifle Corps (headquarters used to form 48th Army on 7 August)

70th Rifle Division
128th Rifle Division
237th Rifle Division

1st Leningrad People's Militia Division
1st Mountain Rifle Brigade
21st Tank Division

Composition on 1 September 1941:

305th Rifle Division
448th Corps Artillery Regiment
Separate Mortar Battalion
8th Antiaircraft Artillery Battalion
3rd Tank Division
28th Tank Division
50th Engineer Battalion

Composition on 1 October 1941:

180th Rifle Division
185th Rifle Division
305th Rifle Division
Mixed Rifle Regiment
264th Corps Artillery Regiment
448th Corps Artillery Regiment
Mortar Battalion (unnumbered)
8th Antiaircraft Battalion
242nd Antiaircraft Battalion
3rd Tank Division
25th Engineer Battalion
50th Engineer-Bridge Battalion
55th Engineer-Bridge Battalion
56th Engineer-Bridge Battalion

== German ==
Presents the largest and units of the German armed forces. It should be borne in mind that the operation involved a variety of specialist, such as artillery and self-propelled artillery (including the provision of OKH), Samokatnaya, rail, engineering, combat engineers, pontoon bridge, part of the army air defense and air defense and the Luftwaffe.

=== Army Group North (Heeresgruppe Nord) (Field Marshal Wilhelm Ritter von Leeb) ===
Data on 8 August 1941.

==== 18th Army (Generaloberst Georg von Küchler) ====
Participated throughout the operation. Led offensive in Estonia, along the eastern shore of Lake Peipsi, then advanced on Leningrad from the south-west and west.

The XXXXII Army Corps was transferred to the 18th Army on 18 July 1941.

XXXXII Army Corps (Walter Kuntze)

61st Infantry Division
217th Infantry Division

XXVI Army Corps (Albert Wodrig)

93rd Infantry Division
254th Infantry Division
291st Infantry Division

==== Panzergruppe 4 (Generaloberst Erich Hoepner) ====
Participated in the operation from 10 July to 18 September 1941. The unit was the main striking force for the German forces attack towards Leningrad. The LVI Motorized Corps advanced towards Luga, bypassing the city to the north, breaking through Soviet positions south of Kingisepp, Krasnogvardeisk, and reached the Pulkovo Heights. On 15 September the main forces of the group begin its redeployment from the Leningrad axis to the Moscow axis.

The L Army Corps was transferred to the group on 14 August 1941.

XXXXI Corps (mot.) (Georg-Hans Reinhardt)

1st Infantry Division
1st Panzer Division
6th Panzer Division
8th Panzer Division
36th Infantry Division (mot.)

LVI Motorized Corps (Erich von Manstein)

269th Infantry Division
SS Polizei Division
3rd Infantry Division (mot.)

XXXVIII Corps (Friedrich-Wilhelm von Chappuis)

58th Infantry Division

L Army Corps (Georg Lindemann) (from 14 August 1941)

269th Infantry Division
SS Polizei Division

==== 16th Army (Generaloberst Ernst Busch) ====
Participated in the operation for the entire period. Originally moving in the area south of Lake Ilmen, the army's right flank was engaged against the Western Front. After regrouping the army advanced north and south of Lake Ilmen on the Novgorod-Chudovo-Leningrad and Staraya Russa-Kholm-Demyansk axis.

XXVIII Army Corps (Mauritz von Wiktorin)

96th Infantry Division
121st Infantry Division
122nd Infantry Division
SS Totenkopf Division

I Army Corps (Kuno-Hans von Both)

11th Infantry Division
21st Infantry Division
126th Infantry Division

II Army Corps (Walter von Brockdorff-Ahlefeldt)

12th Infantry Division
32nd Infantry Division
123rd Infantry Division

X Army Corps (Christian Hansen)

30th Infantry Division
290th Infantry Division

==== 3rd Panzer Group ====
Part of the group was involved in operations from 24 August to the end of the operation at Leningrad (XXXIX Motorized Corps) and from 30 August to 24 September 1941 in the Demyansk direction (LVII Motorized Corps).

XXXIX Motorized Corps (Rudolf Schmidt)

12th Panzer Division
18th Motorized Division
20th Motorized Division

LVII Motorized Corps (Adolf-Friedrich Kuntzen)

19th Panzer Division
20th Panzer Division

=== Luftflotte 1 ===
Data as of 3 August 1941.

2.(F)/ObdL Wekusta (2nd Squadron, Long-Range reconnaissance Luftwaffe High Command)
1 KGr z.b.V. 106 (1st Transport Squadron, 106th Military Transport Group)

==== I. Fliegerkorps ====
Took part in the entire operation. Reinforces by Kampfgeschwader 4 on 6 August 1941.

5th Squadron, 122nd Intelligence Group
Kampfgeschwader 1 - He 111H, Ju 88A (Group 2 and 3)
Kampfgeschwader 76 - Ju 88A
Kampfgeschwader 77 - Ju 88A
Sturzkampfgeschwader 77 - Ju 87B, Bf 110
Zerstörergeschwader 26 - Bf 110 (Group 1 and 2)
Jagdgeschwader 54 - Bf 109F
Jagdgeschwader 53 - Bf 109F (Group 2 only)

==== VIII. Fliegerkorps ====
The VIII. Fliegerkorps took part in the operation from late July to 20 September 1941.

2nd Squadron, 11th Intelligence Group
1st Transport Squadron, 4th Transport Group
Kampfgeschwader 2 - Do 17Z (Group 1)
Kampfgeschwader 3 - Do 17Z (Group 3)
Schnellkampfgeschwader 210 - Bf 110 (Group 2)
Sturzkampfgeschwader 2 - Ju 87B (Group 1, 3)
Lehrgeschwader 2 - Bf 109E, Hs 123 (2nd and 10th Squadron)
Jagdgeschwader 27 - Bf 109F, Bf 109E (Group 3 only)
Jagdgeschwader 52 - Bf 109F (Group 2 only)

==== Reconnaissance Group East ====
125th Naval Intelligence Group
Kampfgruppe 806 - Ju 88A
Jagdgeschwader 54 - Bf 109E (only 1 staffel)
