= 202nd Rifle Division =

202nd Motorized Division (February 1941 - September 20, 1941) 202nd Rifle Division (September 20, 1941 - 1945)
- Active: 1941–1945
- Country: Soviet Union
- Branch: Red Army
- Type: Infantry
- Role: Motorized Infantry
- Size: Division
- Engagements: Operation Barbarossa; Baltic operation Battle of Leningrad; Starya Russa Counterattack; Demyansk Pocket; Battle of Kursk; Operation Kutuzov; Battle of the Dniepr; Battle of Kiev (1943); Battle of Korsun–Cherkassy; Uman–Botoșani offensive First Jassy–Kishinev offensive Battle of Târgu Frumos; Second Jassy–Kishinev offensive Battle of Debrecen; Operation Spring Awakening; Vienna offensive
- Decorations: Order of the Red Banner; Order of Suvorov; Order of Kutuzov
- Battle honours: Korsun-Shevchenkivskyi

Commanders
- Notable commanders: Col. Vladimir Konstantinovich Gorbachyov; Maj. Gen. Serafim Grigorevich Shtykov; Col. Sergei Andreevich Vdovin; Col. Zinovii Savvich Revenko; Maj. Gen. Ivan Mikhailovich Khokhlov

The 202nd Rifle Division was an infantry division of the Red Army, originally formed as a motorized division as part of the prewar buildup of forces, and from September 1941 serving as a regular rifle division. As with most pre-war motorized divisions it lacked most of its authorized motor vehicles and shortly after the German invasion had most of its tanks reassigned. Despite this it fought well in actions near Soltsy and Staraya Russa in July and August, gaining time for the defenders of Leningrad at significant cost to itself.

In September the 202nd was reorganized as a regular rifle division and served as such for the duration of the war. Beginning in January 1942 it took part in the fighting that temporarily encircled the German II Army Corps at Demyansk. It spent the next 12 months in the dismal battles around this salient, gaining only minor successes. After the German evacuation the division was moved to the central part of the front and took part in the battle of Kursk and the subsequent Operation Kutuzov. After some time in reserve for rebuilding it joined the fighting west of Kiev in November and December and later took part in the battle of the Korsun Pocket, winning a battle honor. In the spring of 1944, it advanced through much of western Ukraine and entered Romanian territory in late March, for which it was awarded the Order of the Red Banner. In the battles northwest of Iași in April and May the 202nd suffered heavy casualties but was again rebuilt to take part in the August offensive that knocked Romania out of the Axis. As part of 27th Army of 2nd Ukrainian Front it advanced through Transylvania in the autumn, during which its regiments won several honorifics and decorations. It further distinguished itself in the fighting in eastern Hungary during the winter of 1944/45 and ended the war in western Austria as part of 3rd Ukrainian Front. This highly distinguished division was disbanded later in 1945.

== 202nd Motorized Division ==
The division began forming in February 1941 near Riga in the Baltic Special Military District as part of the 12th Mechanized Corps. As of June 22, 1941 it had the following order of battle:

- 645th Motorized Rifle Regiment
- 682nd Motorized Rifle Regiment
- 125th Tank Regiment (until July 12, 1941)
- 652nd Artillery Regiment
- 189th Antitank Battalion
- 151st Antiaircraft Battalion
- 281st Reconnaissance Battalion
- 371st Sapper Battalion
- 581st Signal Battalion
- 200th Artillery Park Battalion
- 357th Medical/Sanitation Battalion
- 674th Motor Transport Battalion
- 106th Repair and Restoration Battalion
- 53rd Regulatory Company
- 461st Motorized Field Bakery
- 839th Field Postal Station
- 695th Field Office of the State Bank

Col. Vladimir Konstantinovich Gorbachyov was appointed to command on March 11. When the German invasion began the division had almost all of its authorized artillery and heavy weapons and about 200 T-26 tanks of various models, including one company in the 281st Reconnaissance Battalion. However, it had only about 30 percent of the trucks and tractors required to move its men and equipment. A greater difficulty was that it had only 50 percent of its authorized radios, the signal battalion was short over 60 percent of its specialists.

=== Baltic Operation ===
On June 22 the 12th Mechanized Corps was in 8th Army of the newly renamed Northwestern Front. The Corps also contained the 23rd and 28th Tank Divisions and the 10th Motorcycle Regiment. The 202nd was centered on Kelmė in northwestern Lithuania but its elements were scattered over 60 km apart. Given the shortage of signal equipment, when the Corps went into battle the division simply could not organize itself fast enough to join the tank divisions. As a result, the 125th Tank Regiment was taken from the division on June 26 and added to the 28th Tanks to try to make up for the losses that division had already suffered. From this point the division was effectively "motorized" in name only, even after remnants of the 125th returned to it on July 12.

By July 1 the 202nd had been detached from 12th Mechanized Corps and was serving as a separate division in 11th Army. It was attempting to hold along the Dvina River, which had been crossed by the German 36th Motorized Division near Jēkabpils. Counterattacks by the much-weakened division were unsuccessful and it began to withdraw toward Ostrov. On July 4 it was ordered back to the area of Soltsy for rebuilding and by July 10 it was back in 12th Mechanized Corps in 8th Army with the remnants of the two tank divisions which had also been withdrawn. On July 16 Colonel Gorbachyov left his command, being replaced by Col. Aleksandr Mikhailovich Filippov. Gorbachyov was soon given command of the 262nd Rifle Division and was promoted to the rank of major general in May 1942, ending the war commanding the 346th Rifle Division.

=== Counterstrokes at Soltsy and Staraya Russa ===
By mid-July Army Group North's drive on Leningrad had stalled, due to logistics, difficult terrain and Red Army resistance, including a counterattack involving the 202nd near Soltsy which temporarily encircled the 8th Panzer Division. On July 30 Hitler issued a directive for the renewal of the offensive with a main attack between Narva and Lake Ilmen. This was followed on August 6 with a communique from OKW that stated Soviet forces had been almost completely cleared from the Baltic states and that the start line had been occupied for the thrust on Leningrad. Meanwhile, the STAVKA was preparing for the renewed offensive and issued orders on August 9 and 10 to Marshal K. E. Voroshilov of the Northwestern Direction and Maj. Gen. P. P. Sobennikov of Northwestern Front to use the reinforcements provided to them in late July and early August for a counterstroke aimed at destroying German forces in the Soltsy, Staraya Russa and Dno regions. The operation would be largely planned and directed by Lt. Gen. N. F. Vatutin, Sobennikov's chief of staff. As of August 1 the mobile forces of 11th Army consisted of the 202nd and 163rd Motorized Divisions, 5th Motorcycle Regiment and 41st Tank Brigade.

Vatutin's plan involved concentric attacks by the 11th, 27th, 34th and 48th Armies and was clearly overly ambitious. It was to begin on August 12 aimed at 16th Army's X Army Corps which was defending at Staraya Russa and, after cutting it off and destroying it, to then liberate Soltsy, Dno and Kholm, disrupting the German offensive. In the event it was preempted when the German forces went over to their own attacks on August 10, but still achieved success on some sectors. Most notably the 202nd and 163rd Motorized, which were now in 34th Army, joined the 25th Cavalry Division in a lunge that pushed 40 km westward through the German defensive cordon and reached the Staraya Russa–Dno rail line early on August 14. This determined assault enveloped X Corps in Staraya Russa, separated it from II Army Corps on its right flank and threatened the rear of the main German panzer force advancing on Novgorod. The situation was restored by August 22 through the intervention of the LVI Panzer Corps and three days later the 34th and 11th Armies had been driven back to the line of the Lovat River. Although suffering heavy losses (from August 10–28 34th Army suffered 60 percent casualties in personnel, 89 percent losses in tanks and 58 percent in other vehicles) the Soltsy operation delayed Army Group North's drive on Leningrad for another 10 days which may have been decisive in keeping the city in Soviet hands.

While the Staraya Russa operation was going on Colonel Filippov was replaced in command on August 15 by Col. Serafim Grigorevich Shtykov. By the beginning of September the division had returned to 11th Army and was no longer listed as a motorized division. On September 20 this became official when the division was converted to the 202nd Rifle Division in the front lines of 11th Army in Northwestern Front.

== 202nd Rifle Division ==
Once the conversion was complete the division, still under command of Colonel Shtykov, had the following order of battle:

- 645th Rifle Regiment
- 682nd Rifle Regiment
- 1317th Rifle Regiment (from 21st Motorized Rifle Regiment of the disbanded 28th Tank Division)
- 652nd Artillery Regiment (reformed on October 15, 1941)
- 189th Antitank Battalion (reestablished on January 20, 1942)
- 324th Antiaircraft Battery (151st Antiaircraft Battalion) (until March 30, 1943)
- 281st Motorized Reconnaissance Battalion (included one company of T-26 tanks and one platoon of GAZ-64 light trucks)
- 371st Sapper Battalion
- 317th Mortar Battalion (from January 20 to March 1, 1942)
- 466th Mortar Battalion (from November 30, 1941, to November 15, 1942)
- 581st Signal Battalion (later 77th Signal Company)
- 357th Medical/Sanitation Battalion (later 257th)
- 82nd Chemical Defense (Anti-gas) Company
- 266th Auto Transport Company
- 326th Field Bakery (336th Motorized Field Bakery)
- 86th Divisional Veterinary Hospital
- 839th Field Postal Station
- 695th Field Office of the State Bank

As of the beginning of December the division was still in 11th Army, which had withdrawn to the area of the Valdai Hills. On December 16 Shtykov left command of the division and on the 21st took over the 253rd Rifle Division but this proved temporary and he moved back to the 202nd on December 31; in the interim Col. Georgii Grigorievich Voronin had been in command. On January 10, 1942, Shtykov was promoted to the rank of major general. By this time the division had returned to 34th Army.

=== Battle of Demyansk ===
34th Army was under command of Maj. Gen. N. E. Berzarin. As the Red Army's winter counteroffensive widened from the Moscow area he was ordered to form two division-sized shock groups to support the efforts of 11th and 3rd Shock Armies but otherwise to fix as much of German 16th Army in place as possible with diversionary attacks. The first shock group was based on the 254th Rifle Division which faced the weakened 290th Infantry Division. Beginning on January 10 the 254th infiltrated the positions of the 290th with ski troops through frozen marshes and cut the supplies of three company-sized strongpoints which were gradually eliminated by the rest of Berzarin's forces. The 202nd, forming the second group, was committed to widen the breach. It had been reinforced with two mortar battalions which were better able to provide support fire in this heavily forested, swampy and largely roadless terrain than conventional artillery. After an advance of 13 km it cut the Parfino–Lychkovo railway line which left the 290th in a long, thin salient between 34th and 11th Armies.

At the beginning of February the 290th Infantry was still holding east of the Pola River but II Corps and several other German units were vulnerable to encirclement at Demyansk. The bridge at Davidovo over the Redya River was the target for 11th Army's 1st Guards Rifle Corps and was taken February 5, after which the Corps reached the village of Ramushevo on the Lovat three days later, cutting the last road to Demyansk. The 290th was virtually surrounded with Soviet ski troops operating freely in its rear. To avoid annihilation it was permitted to pull back south from the Pola. When this was completed it was facing the 202nd east of Vasilevshchina. On February 25 the full encirclement of II Corps was completed. The STAVKA ordered that Northwestern Front should crush the pocketed force within four or five days; meanwhile reinforcements were arriving from Germany and the airlifting of supplies was well underway. On March 16 the 645th Rifle Regiment was awarded the Order of the Red Banner in recognition of its successes in the fighting to that point.

The German attempt to relieve the pocket, Operation Brückenschlag, began on March 21 but the linkup with the besieged grouping was not achieved until April 21. The so-called "Ramushevo corridor" was less than 4 km wide and often under Soviet artillery fire so II Corps was still heavily dependent on air supply. During April the 202nd returned to 11th Army. From May to October Northwestern Front made several attempts to sever the corridor. German engineers turned the area into a fortified zone, complete with deep barbed wire obstacles and extensive minefields. 11th Army was on the north side of the corridor while 1st Shock Army held the south side; 34th and 53rd Armies covered the remainder of the salient.

The 202nd took part in the offensive that began on July 17. It formed a shock group with the 370th Rifle Division with the objective of Vasilevshchina on the north side of the corridor. Northwestern Front now had much more artillery, tank and air support than it had had during the winter battles. Facing them was Jäger Regiment 38 of the recently arrived 8th Jäger Division. The attack began with a 90-minute artillery preparation before the two divisions began their advance at 1530 hours. The artillery and air support had been effective, and although tanks and infantry were lost in German minefields, the village was soon in Soviet hands, and a further advance to Loznitsy would cut the corridor. However, 8th Jäger ordered its 38th Regiment to counterattack immediately, and this was remarkably successful, recovering the village and throwing the Red Army forces back in disarray. The contest for the village continued for another six days and both sides suffered serious losses, including 59 knocked-out Soviet tanks. The 202nd would not be combat-effective again for several months.

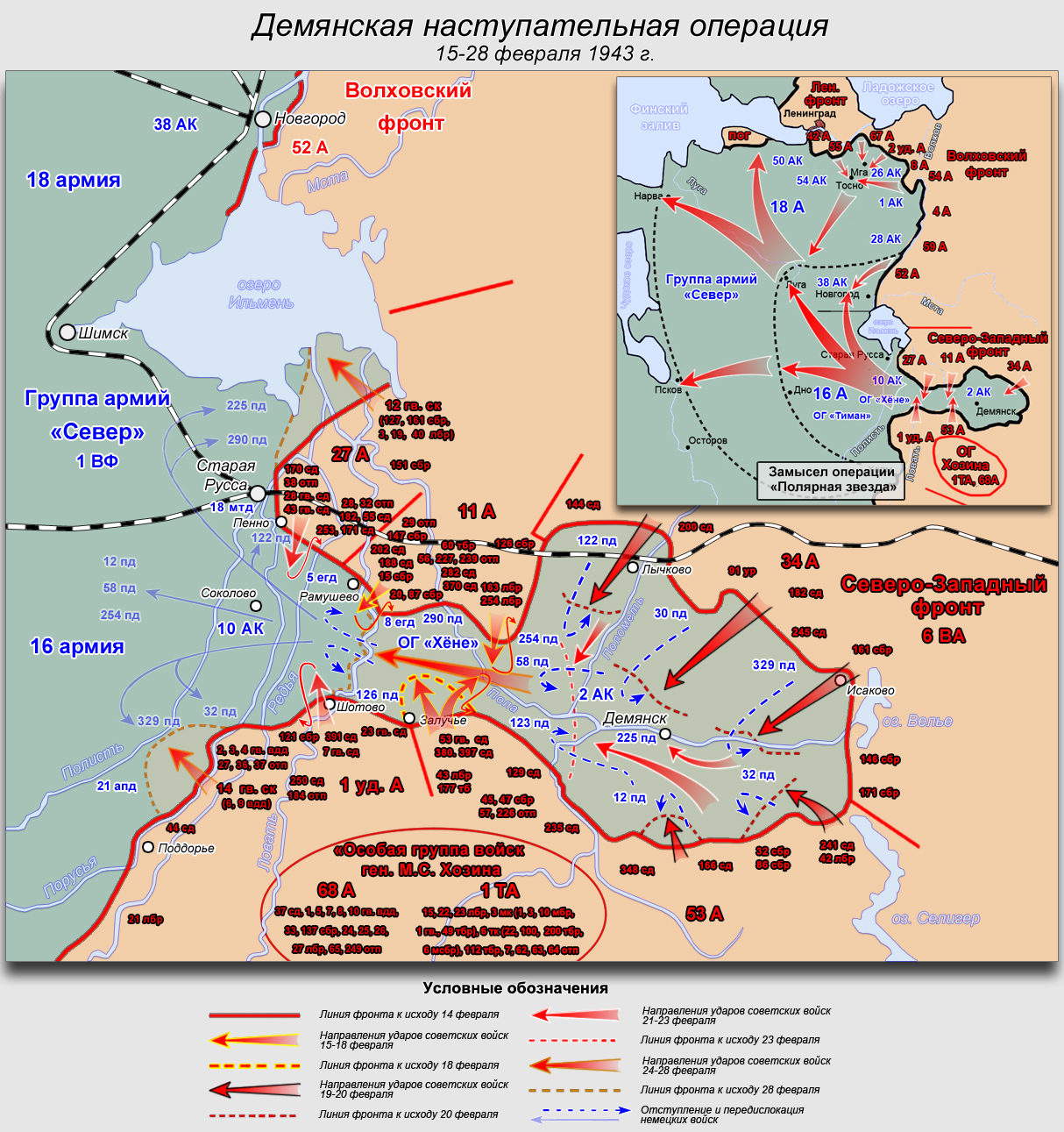
Soviet positions at Demyansk, spring 1943. The 202nd was on the right flank of 11th Army at the time.

On or around October 16 the STAVKA sent preliminary orders to Northwestern Front to begin preparing for another offensive against the stubborn salient, to coincide with Operation Mars at Rzhev and 3rd Shock Army's offensive on Velikiye Luki. The makeup of the Army's shock group for this offensive is not clear but the 202nd managed to take the village of Pustynia on the night of November 22/23 from elements of the 122nd Infantry Division after heavy fighting; according to the divisional history:

The village was located on heights jutting out into our defenses... On 22 November the village was taken after a decisive attack supported by artillery and volleys of guards-mortars - katiushas. ...The Fascist garrison was completely destroyed in the battle for Pustynia village. Trophies included about 200 heavy and light machine guns, 5 guns, and many other weapons...

Despite this success the division was unable to advance any further south. The main offensive began on November 27 but was shut down on December 11 after making very little progress. The division made a further attack in January 1943 along the Radovo–Sofronkovo sector. On January 9, after a severe firefight, elements of the division reached positions 200-250m east and 250-300m northeast of Sofronkovo. While his division was under heavy machine gun and artillery fire General Shtykov was killed by a direct hit on his observation post. He was replaced the same day by Col. Ivan Petrovich Petrov, who was in turn replaced by Col. Sergei Andreevich Vdovin three days later.

=== Redeployment to the South ===
On January 31, 1943, the German High Command ordered that the Demyansk salient be evacuated, in the wake of the encirclement and upcoming destruction of 6th Army at Stalingrad. Operation Ziethen began on February 17. At this time the 202nd was part of the 12th Guards Rifle Corps, still in 11th Army. The division had been earmarked for Operation Polyarnaya Zvezda, which began on February 10, but the German withdrawal from Demyansk freed up the reserves they needed to reinforce their lines along the Lovat, and the operation collapsed. By the start of March the division had left both 12th Guards Corps and 11th Army and was serving under 27th Army. According to STAVKA Order No. 46079 of March 20 the 202nd, along with six other rifle divisions and six rifle brigades of Northwestern Front, was ordered to proceed to Livny where it would become part of the Reserve of the Supreme High Command. The headquarters of 53rd Army was included in this order, and the 202nd came under its command at Livny.

== Battle of Kursk ==
Both sides were in need of rest and replenishment after the winter battles and the front went into a relatively quiet period in the spring. When May began the 53rd Army was still in Reserve in the Steppe Military District. On May 3 the division returned to the active army in the 48th Army of Central Front; in June it was assigned to that Army's 42nd Rifle Corps, which also contained the 16th Lithuanian and 399th Rifle Divisions. On June 16 Colonel Vdovin left the division and was replaced in command by Col. Zinovii Savvich Revenko. As the 202nd rebuilt its strength it was noted at this time as having about 30 percent of its personnel from the 1925 age group.

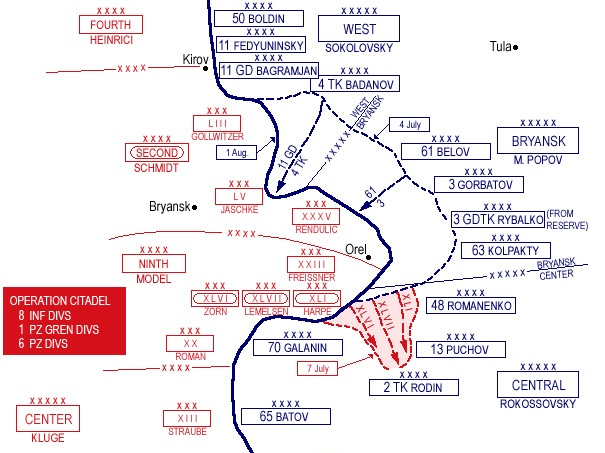
Map of Operation Kutuzov

When the German Zitadelle offensive began on July 5 the 48th Army was on the right flank of Central Front with seven rifle divisions defending a 38 km-wide front from Droskovo to Stepanishchevo to Verkhnyaya Gnilusha to the 2nd Five-Year Plan Sovkhoz. Three divisions were in the first echelon with four, including the 202nd, occupying the second defensive zone. It had the 2nd Antitank Brigade and three tank regiments in support, plus the 1168th Cannon Artillery Regiment and three self-propelled artillery regiments. While the possibility of the main German attack from the north striking 48th Army was anticipated it was considered more likely to come against 13th Army to its left. In the event the assault by German 9th Army followed the more likely path and 48th Army played little role in the defensive battle. By July 15 the German forces had been fought to a standstill and the 48th, 13th, 70th, and 2nd Tank Armies were prepared to go over to the counteroffensive against the German grouping in the Oryol salient.

=== Operation Kutuzov ===
48th Army was ordered to attack with its left flank 42nd Corps along the sector Sondrovka–outside Krasnaya Slobodka in the direction of Yasnaya Polyana and Shamshin and by the end of July 17 to reach a line from Nagornyi to Shamshin, after which it was to develop the offensive toward Zmievka. At 0600 hours on July 15, following a 15-minute artillery fire onslaught, Central Front went over to the attack. Despite stubborn resistance by 0800 Soviet forces had penetrated up to 2–3 km on some sectors; 42nd Corps made considerable progress toward Kunach. The advance continued over the next week despite the defenders making good use of terrain and pre-existing defenses and after forcing the Neruch River on July 22 the right flank forces of 48th Army liberated the town of Bogodukhov on July 24 while its center and left flank reached a line from Glazunovka to Gremyachevo. Following this the Army sped up its advance to the northwest from the line of the Zmievka-Ponyri railroad, but by about this time the 202nd had been transferred to the 28th Rifle Corps of 13th Army.

By August 1 the 13th and 70th Armies were making a joint advance in the direction of Kromy. Oryol itself fell to forces of Bryansk Front on August 5. On or near August 18 the Soviet forces reached the Hagen position at the base of the former salient. On September 12 the 202nd was again removed to the Reserve of the Supreme High Command where it joined the 95th Rifle Corps of 70th Army but as of the beginning of November it was still rebuilding as a separate division.

== Into Ukraine ==
When the division returned to the front on November 2, it was assigned to the 21st Rifle Corps of 38th Army in 1st Ukrainian Front. Kiev was liberated by this Army on November 6, after which the Corps was committed and advanced a further 20 km against negligible resistance, with the 202nd reaching a line from Belgorodka to Bobritsa to Zaborye. Over the following week the advance slowed as new German forces concentrated for an offensive to retake the Ukrainian capital. Overnight on November 12/13 the STAVKA ordered the 38th, 40th and 3rd Guards Tank Armies to take up defensive positions along the front Zhytomyr–Fastiv–Trypillia. 38th Army's 21st and 23rd Rifle Corps took up a line from Kamenka and the Huiva River as far as Volitsa station. The German advance on November 13, led by half of 1st SS Panzer Division Leibstandarte SS Adolf Hitler and elements of the arriving 1st Panzer Division, first struck at Fastiv but then shifted to the west against 21st Corps; its 71st and 135th Rifle Divisions had been shaky in the previous day's fighting and had lost the town of Kornin. In the latter half of the day the German force managed to break through the Corps' front and advance toward Brusyliv. The Corps was quickly reinforced with antitank artillery, the 13th Artillery Division, and a group of 59 tanks from 3rd Guards Tank Army. On November 14 the 71st Division was forced to abandon the communities of Sobolevka and Korolevka. The next day the 202nd was defending along a front north and northeast of Ivnitsa but there were large gaps between the Corps' three divisions. Throughout this fighting, due to poor organization in the rear, the divisions were short of ammunition and fuel for their vehicles. On November 16 the two panzer divisions again attempted to break through to Brusyliv but made only minor progress in head-on attacks so shifted to the sector of 211th Rifle Division in the afternoon. This division began a fighting withdrawal to the north, leading to a penetration by German tanks into the Vilnya area which threatened the rear areas of the 202nd and 75th Guards Rifle Divisions.

Responsibility for the defense of Zhytomyr was given to 60th Army on November 16. Overnight, in 38th Army the 202nd was authorized to pull back to the line Grabovka–Yelizavetivka–Berezovyi Gai. Despite all efforts the Front's situation in the areas of Zhytomyr and Brusyliv continued to worsen during November 17. Following the penetration at Vilnya the main forces of 1st SS Panzer and 1st Panzer were concentrated there in preparation for attacks to the north and northwest. 38th and 3rd Guards Tank Armies were engaged in bitter fighting all day but lead elements of the 1st SS managed to reach the Zhytomyr-Kiev paved road and turned east. Meanwhile, additional German reserves were arriving. In a regrouping on November 18 the 202nd was detached from 21st Corps and two days later it was reassigned to 60th Army as a separate division. The XIII Army Corps and XXXXVIII Panzer Corps recaptured Zhytomyr on November 19, and the 1st SS Panzer reached Brusyliv on the 23rd, but by then several days of rain had turned the roads to mud. Two days later the offensive was temporarily halted due to the weather.

In the first week of December the weather turned cold and by the 6th the German tanks were able to move again on the frozen roads. XXXXVIII Panzer Corps began attacking north of Zhytomyr and made good progress over the next two days against stiffening resistance which brought the advance to a halt by December 10. It attempted to renew the assault to outflank 60th Army on December 19 but made almost no gains in the next three days, meeting Soviet forces massed for another advance on Zhytomyr. 4th Panzer Army went over to the defense on December 21. Due to its losses the 202nd was again withdrawn to the Reserve of the Supreme High Command on December 31.

=== Battle of Korsun-Shevchenkivskyi ===
When the division returned to the active front on January 20, 1944, it was assigned to the 106th Rifle Corps of 47th Army, still in 1st Ukrainian Front. At the time this Army was very small, with just one Corps of three divisions (3rd Guards Airborne, 302nd and 202nd) assigned. At the turn of the year the German 8th Army still held a 160 km sector from Kaniv to 30 km east of Kirovograd, 30 km of which was still along the Dniepr. On January 24 a reconnaissance-in-force by 2nd Ukrainian Front found a poorly-defended section of the German line and penetrated deeply. Two days later the 6th Tank Army broke through 1st Panzer Army and by the afternoon of January 28 the 56,000 men of XI and XXXXII Army Corps were encircled.

During the first two weeks of February the forces of the two Soviet Fronts attempted to split and eliminate the pocket while German forces outside, primarily the III Panzer Corps, attempted to break in to relieve it. This failed and an hour before midnight on February 16 the breakout effort began. Over the next day roughly half of the encircled force managed to escape, many unarmed. The 202nd was one of several Red Army units granted honorifics for this victory:

KORSUN-SHEVCHENKOVSKII – ...202nd Rifle Division (Col. Revenko, Zinovii Savvich)... The troops that participated in the liberation of Korsun-Shevchenkovskii, by order of the Supreme Commander-in-Chief of 18 January 1944 and a commendation in Moscow, are given a salute of 20 artillery salvoes by 224 guns.

Colonel Revenko had left command of the division on February 16, but he was not officially replaced until March 11 by Col. Ivan Mikhailovich Khokhlov; this officer would be promoted to the rank of major general on April 19, 1945, and would lead the division until after the German surrender. Before the end of the month the 202nd was transferred to the 35th Guards Rifle Corps of 27th Army in 2nd Ukrainian Front; it would remain in this Army for the duration of the war.

== Jassy–Kishinev offensives ==
Uman–Botoșani Offensive. Note advance of 27th Army.

35th Guards Corps also contained the 93rd Guards and 78th Rifle Divisions. Beginning on March 5 it joined in the Uman–Botoșani offensive through western Ukraine toward the boundary of Moldavia and the Dniestr River. On the night of March 27/28 the 202nd was one of the divisions of 27th Army that forced the Prut River and entered Romanian territory; in recognition the division would be decorated with the Order of the Red Banner on April 20.

=== First Battle of Târgu Frumos ===
27th Army was under the command of Lt. Gen. S. G. Trofimenko. 35th Guards Corps, which now also contained the 206th Rifle Division, was on the Army's right (west) wing. 2nd Ukrainian Front, under command of Marshal I. S. Konev, began a drive southward on April 7 toward the city of Iași. The Army's 35th Guards and 33rd Rifle Corps were 16–55 km northwest of Iași and their initial mission was to reach the Târgu Frumos, Pașcani and Târgu Neamț regions, 45–95 km west of the city and capture the three towns from their Romanian defenders, if possible by surprise. The terrain was hilly and forested and cut by many streams and rivers swollen by spring runoff. 35th Guards Corps was led by 3rd Guards Airborne, flanked on the east by the 202nd and 206th, driving the Romanian 8th Infantry Division's main forces back toward the town of Hârlău, about 30 km north of Târgu Frumos The following day the 202nd and 3rd Guards, supported by elements of the 2nd Tank Army, closed in on Târgu Frumos from the northeast. Overnight the Romanian IV Army Corps scraped up enough forces to man the forward positions of the Strunga Line, which extended from Târgu Neamț to Pașcani and through Târgu Frumos and Podu Iloaiei to just south of Iași. Meanwhile, a battlegroup of 24th Panzer Division, consisting of 12 tanks and a battalion of infantry, was ordered to Podu Iloaiei to counterattack the Soviet advance.

35th Guards Corps continued its advance on April 9 with 202nd and 206th Divisions in first echelon. The 206th soon cleared the defenders from Târgu Frumos while the 202nd swept eastward north of the Hârlău–Podu Iloaiei rail line toward Belcești and Munteni, 14 km and 16 km northeast of Târgu Frumos respectively. The 3rd Guards Airborne and 93rd Guards moved forward to reinforce the first echelon. The forward detachments of 2nd Tanks attempted to move in support as well but got tied up with 24th Panzers north of Podu Iloaiei. In reaction to the threat of 35th Guards Corps' advance on April 8 German 8th Army had ordered its Panzergrenadier Division Großdeutschland to regroup westward to restore the situation around Târgu Frumos. It reached the western edge of Podu Iloaiei in the afternoon of April 9.

Just before it arrived the 202nd reached and captured the village of Sârca on the rail line 8 km west of the town, but was soon halted by the arriving main body of Großdeutschland. At about the same time the lead elements of 33rd Corps were approaching from the north, but these were drawn into the fighting with 24th Panzers as the main body of 2nd Tanks was struggling with mud and poor roads in order to get south to support the infantry. Early on April 10 Großdeutschland, which had roughly 160 tanks on strength, including 40 Panthers and 40 Tigers, attacked westward along the road from Podu Iloaiei to Târgu Frumos. Sârca was recaptured and elements of the 202nd, taken by surprise, were cut off and forced to surrender or escape. Overnight the German division broke into Târgu Frumos against the rear elements of the remainder of 35th Guards Corps, leaving it in disarray as Romanian forces began pushing back from the south. The three divisions had no choice but to fight their way out of the developing trap; their only saving grace was that most of the motorized infantry of Großdeutschland had fallen behind leaving gaps between the tank groups that the riflemen could escape through overnight. By the next morning the survivors took up new defenses north and northeast of Târgu Frumos while the German forces built up positions to defend it. The shattered 202nd was then withdrawn into the Corps' second echelon behind the east bank of the Seret River.

=== Second Battle of Târgu Frumos ===
By April 24 the division had been moved eastward and come under command of 33rd Corps. Marshal Konev was still determined to take Iași and organized a new offensive to begin on May 1. As part of this 2nd Tank Army was to support 27th Army in recapturing Târgu Frumos by enveloping the town from the east and then exploiting towards Vaslui in the south or through Slobodzia to capture Iași. In order to disguise his intent the 337th Rifle Division conducted a reconnaissance-in-force against the Romanian 18th Mountain Infantry Division on the morning of the 24th, followed the next day with an assault by the 78th, 180th and 202nd Divisions of 33rd Corps, supported by the 103rd Tank Brigade, between the villages of Tăutești and Vânători. By day's end the infantry and tanks managed to wedge up to 3 km deep into the Romanian defenses on a 5 km front but the arrival of German reinforcements from IV Corps restored the Romanian positions and 33rd Corps withdrew to its start line by the end of April 28.

On May 1 the shock groups of 27th Army attempted to carry out reconnaissances, but were met by German artillery fire and bombing attacks. 33rd Corps was still concentrated northwest of Iași with directions to join the offensive if 35th Guards Corps' attack succeeded. The 202nd, 78th and 337th Divisions were deployed in a single echelon with little armor support, facing two regiments of the German 46th Infantry Division. The Corps received orders from General Trofimenko on the same day to begin to attack at 0615 hours on May 2 following an artillery preparation. It did so but achieved no success after encountering stubborn resistance and was fighting in its previous positions at day's end. It took 15 Romanian soldiers as prisoners but itself suffered 24 killed and 113 wounded. While 35th Guards Corps had made some initial gains against Großdeutschland it had since stalled and by May 4 Konev gave up all hopes of resuming his offensive.

==== Operation Katja ====
Konev soon began planning for a new attempt on Iași which was to begin on May 25. In preparation the 27th Army carried out a major regrouping which finally concentrated its two Corps north and northwest of the city and it was to be supported by the 3rd and 16th Tank Corps of 2nd Tank Army. In the last days of May Großdeutschland and 24th Panzer were assembled near Tăutești for a spoiling attack designated Operation Katja. As the German intentions became clear Trofimenko deployed his Army for defense with the 202nd and 337th Divisions deployed from west to east on an 8 km-wide sector from Horlești to Avantul; at this time the 202nd is described as still being "severely damaged" from the earlier fighting. The 206th Division was just arriving in this area to form the second echelon of 33rd Corps.

The attack began on June 2 and quickly penetrated the Corps' forward defenses. Two battlegroups of Großdeutschland struck the entire front of the 202nd, the left wing of 54th Fortified Region and the right wing of 337th Division. The multi-pronged attack tore several holes in the Soviet front but faced well-prepared defenses, heavy fire from katiushas, and air attacks. The division was soon forced to retreat northward in considerable disorder although its right-flank rifle regiment, with the help of the heavy weapon crews of the 54th Fortified Region, managed to hold the strongpoint at Avantul and the adjacent high ground to the northwest. Late in the day as a few tanks of 11th Guards Tank Brigade arrived to reinforce, along with the 206th Division. By this time Avantul itself had fallen, but the 202nd clung to the high ground and with the help of the reinforcements also held its positions south of Epureni and Movileni Station. More tanks from 16th Tank Corps arrived after dark. By now part of this sector of the Axis front had been turned over to the Romanian 18th Mountain Division. In the morning the Grenadier Regiment of Großdeutschland renewed the assault on Epureni and by evening had advanced to within 2 km of that village in the face of counterattacks by up to 20 tanks, including several IS-2s. The heavy fighting south of Epureni continued through June 4; at this point the German division had just four Tigers still serviceable. The next day the Romanian 18th Mountain took over the entire front facing Epureni as the panzers shifted to the east. On June 7 the 33rd Corps, now reinforced with the 93rd Guards and 409th Rifle Divisions, counterattacked toward Zahorna and took Hill 181 from the Romanian force. Großdeutschland was forced to intervene with what was left of its assault gun brigade. It was now clear that Katja could make no further progress and both sides went over to the defense the next day.

=== Second Jassy-Kishinev Offensive ===
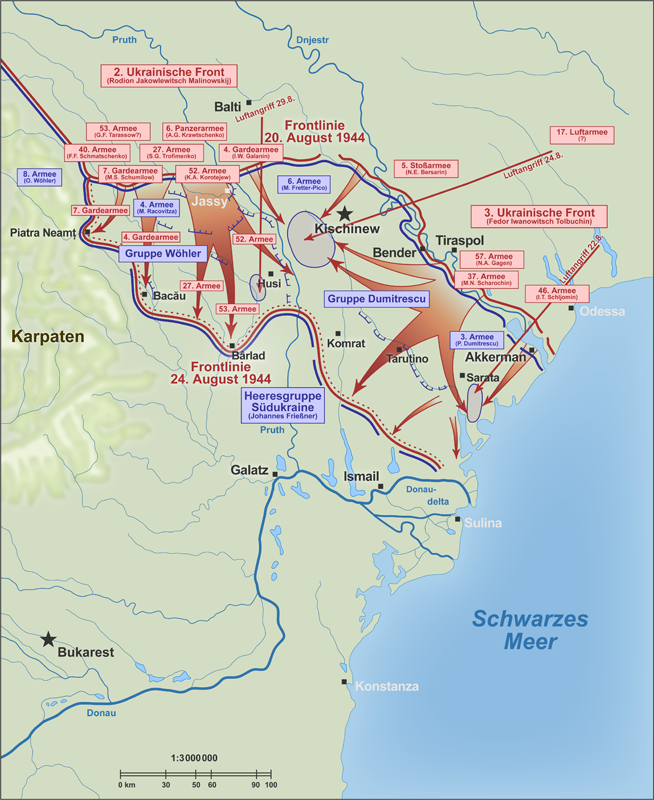
Second Jassy-Kishinev Offensive. Note position of 27th Army.

By the beginning of July the 202nd had returned to 35th Guards Corps. In the plan for the offensive the 27th and 52nd Armies were to provide the shock group for 2nd Ukrainian Front and the 35th Guards and 104th Rifle Corps were in 27th Army's first echelon. The 35th Guards Corps deployed the 3rd Guards Airborne and 180th Divisions in its first echelon on a 4 km-wide attack front while the 202nd defended independently along the Army's right flank. It had been reinforced with an antitank artillery regiment and, after expanding its frontage overnight on August 17/18 to allow the adjacent 206th Division of 104th Corps to concentrate, had roughly 11 guns or mortars of 76mm or larger calibre per kilometre of its front. 27th Army was deployed along its previous lines, northeast of Târgu Frumos.

The offensive began on the morning of August 20 following a powerful artillery preparation which lasted an hour and 40 minutes. 27th Army broke through the Axis front northwest of Iași between Spinoasa and Zahorna along a 20 km-wide front and as early as 1100 hours had forced the Bahlui River. By 2000 hours the Army's forces had advanced 7–12 km. The first echelon divisions of 35th Guards Corps were on a line from Scoposeni to Păușești but the 202nd remained along the line it had been holding. The first echelon had successfully carried out its combat tasks for the day; among these was opening a breach to allow the 6th Tank Army to be committed and begin its exploitation role. Among the Axis forces facing 2nd Ukrainian Front four Romanian front-line divisions and the German 76th Infantry Division suffered heavy losses and 3,000 officers and men were taken prisoner.

The breakthrough by 6th Tanks eased the path for the lead divisions of 35th Guards Corps on August 21 while 33rd Corps was beating off counterattacks, so the 202nd was transferred again to its support. On this day 2nd Ukrainian Front widened its breakthrough front to 65 km and deepened it to as much as 25 km, finally capturing Iași. The following day the 202nd and 78th Divisions, leading 33rd Corps, repelled four Axis counterattacks and reached a line between Gidionul and Gurbești. On August 23 the remaining Axis forces were in full retreat and the two Soviet Fronts had begun round-the-clock operations to prevent them from breaking contact. As darkness fell the division was in the area of Băcești, linking to the 25th Guards Rifle Corps of 7th Guards Army, but 33rd Corps was still lagging the rest of 27th Army, now being effectively in second echelon behind 104th Corps. By the end of August 24 the Corps had reached the line Fruncesti–Stănișești–Craesti. By now the German 6th Army was largely encircled and Romania was in the process of surrendering. On September 15 the 682nd Rifle Regiment and the 652nd Artillery Regiment would each receive the Order of the Red Banner and the 1317th Rifle Regiment would be awarded the Order of Kutuzov, 3rd Degree, all for their roles in the capture of Roman, Bacău, and other towns in eastern Romania.

== Into the Balkans ==
In September the 27th Army continued its advance into Romania and also on September 15 the 645th Rifle Regiment was given a battle honor for its crossing of the Râmnicul Sărat River while the 202nd as a whole was awarded the Order of Kutuzov, 2nd Degree, for its earlier part in taking Ploiești. As the division moved into Transylvania the 682nd Rifle Regiment (Maj. Yakovlev, Georgii Aleksandrovich) and 652nd Artillery Regiment (Lt. Col. Glebov, Prokopii Borisovich) were both awarded honorifics for the taking of Cluj-Napoca on October 11, while the 1317th Rifle Regiment would receive the Order of Bogdan Khmelnitsky, 2nd Degree, on October 31 for its part in the same operation. During most of October the division had been back in 35th Guards Corps but by the beginning of November it was assigned to 104th Corps before being returned to 33rd Corps later that month. Further awards came to the division's regiments on November 14 for the Transylvanian campaign: the 1317th won the Order of the Red Banner; the 645th received the Order of Bogdan Khmelnitsky, 2nd Degree; and the 652nd Artillery was given the Order of Aleksandr Nevsky.

Due to operating in Transylvania on the right flank of 2nd Ukrainian Front the 27th Army largely missed the battle of Debrecen and the early stages of the Budapest offensive. General Trofimenko was ordered to relieve units of the 53rd Army along the front Polgár–Tiszafüred by the morning of November 4. Following this the Army was to attack in the general direction of Miskolc beginning on November 7. This first effort made little progress and the offensive was ordered to be renewed on November 26, in conjunction with 40th Army. The city was captured on December 3 and the two Armies continued their advance until December 9. In recognition of its part in taking Miskolc the 189th Antitank Battalion was awarded the Order of the Red Star on December 16.

By the end of December 19 the 27th Army was fighting along a line from Visni (55 km northeast of Gyöngyös) to outside Bator (32 km northeast of the same). Budapest was encircled on December 26 and other Red Army operations in Hungary were suspended while this siege and the several German relief attempts went on until February 13, 1945. During that month 27th Army came under command of 3rd Ukrainian Front, where it remained for the duration.

=== Into Slovakia and Austria ===
With the end of the siege of Budapest and the German Operation Spring Awakening the Front was free to begin its final campaign into Austria. Székesfehérvár was captured for the second time on March 22 and for its part in this the 202nd was awarded its final decoration, the Order of Suvorov, 2nd Degree, on April 26. On the same date the 645th Regiment was given the Order of Suvorov, 3rd Degree, and the 682nd Regiment received the Order of Kutuzov, 3rd Degree, both for assisting in the capture of the towns of Körmend and Vasvár. In April the division was moved for the final time, back to 35th Guards Corps.

== Postwar ==
The division ended the war in western Austria. Its men and women shared the full title of 202nd Rifle Korsun, Order of the Red Banner, Order of Suvorov and Kutuzov Division. [Russian: 202-я стрелковая Корсунских, Краснознамённая, орденов Суворова и Кутузова дивизия.] Nine days after his promotion General Khokhlov was made a Hero of the Soviet Union, largely for his leadership in the Miskolc operation. On May 9 he handed the division over to Maj. Gen. Fyodor Petrovich Shmelyov, who had previously served as deputy commander of both the 33rd Corps and 27th Army. Khokhlov went on to serve in the Soviet invasion of Manchuria in various assignments under Marshal A. M. Vasilevsky and several postwar commands and other assignments until being moved to the reserves in August 1954. He died in Moscow in February 1956.

27th Army was disbanded in September after which 35th Guards Corps was transferred to the 38th Army in Carpathian Military District, where the 202nd was stationed at Khotyn. It was disbanded sometime prior to August 1, 1946.
