= 21st Mechanized Corps =

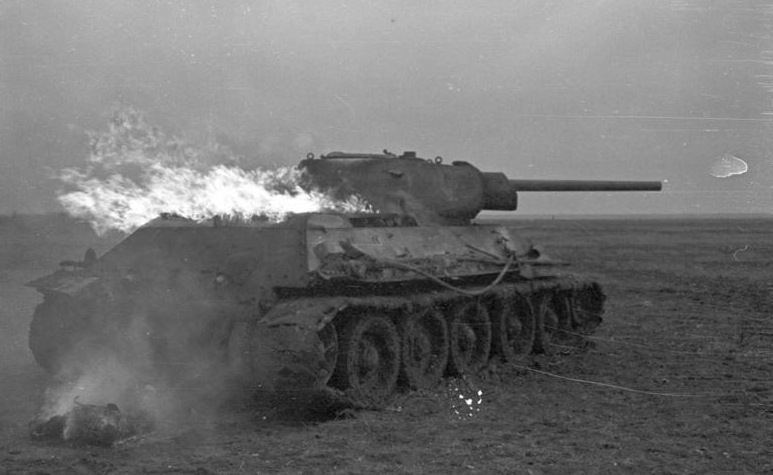
- A T-34 burns in Russia in 1941
- Active: March–August 1941
- Country: Soviet Union
- Branch: Armoured Forces
- Type: Mechanized Corps
- Engagements: Baltic Operation (1941)

Commanders
- Notable commanders: Major General Lelyushenko

The 21st Mechanized Corps was a formation in the Soviet Red Army during the Second World War. Initially formed in March 1941, in response to the German victories in the West it was attached to the newly forming 27th Army, and held in reserve near Opochka in Soviet Union 130 kilometres (81 mi) South of Pskov in the Special Baltic Military District. It was under the command of Major General Lelyushenko when the German Operation Barbarossa began in June 1941. It initially consisted of the 42nd and 46th Tank Divisions, and the 185th Motorized Division. ^{a} After the Invasion began the Special Baltic Military District was renamed Northwestern Front, Commanded by Colonel General Kutznetsov. The front fielded 8th and 11th Armies with the 27th Armies in its second echelon. The 21st Mechanized was heavily engaged in the first battles of Operation Barbarossa, particularly during the Baltic Operation (1941). After the spectacular advances by 4th Panzer Group Kutznetsov asked Stavka for the release of Berzarin's 27th Army and the 21st Mechanized Corps on 25 June and was ordered to halt Erich von Manstein's LVI Panzer Corps which was closing up to the Daugava River later that day both units engaged near Dvinsk.

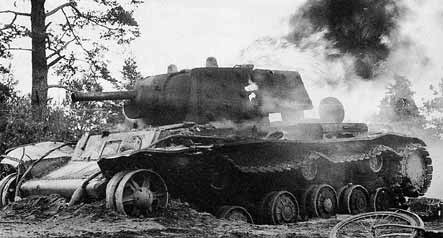
A KV-1 put out of action in Russia in 1941

Next Army Group North sent a special force which captured the bridges at Daugavpils and consolidated with 8th Panzer Division. As the fighting intensified elements of 21st Mechanized Corps broke into the Northern suburbs of the town, with fierce house-to-house fighting. After failing to clear Daugavpils further fighting and attacks by the Luftwaffe succeeded in wearing down its forces during next two days to the extent that by 29 June it had only seven operational tanks, 74 artillery pieces and slightly more than 4,000 men left and was exhausted as a fighting force. On 30 June the Soviet Air Force put in an all out effort which resulted in the loss of 43 aircraft (27 DB-3s and SBs for only four Bf 109s) but did not succeed in destroying the principal river crossings over the Daugava River but did succeed in destroying some pontoon bridges.^{b} After continuing a fighting retreat through the Baltic states in July, but in remnants the 21st Mechanized Corps was disbanded in August 1941.^{c}

== Footnotes ==
- ^{a} On 22 June 1941 21st Mechanized Corps consisted of 98 tanks including Soviet Kv-1s, T-26, Bt 7, T-34s models, plus 130 artillery guns.
- ^{b} On 11 July 1941 Col P Poluboiarov, Northwestern Front armoured directorate reported that the 21st Mechanized Corps had been committed initially in large formations without cooperation from Artillery and Air Support. It had only '25 Kv-1s, 10 T-26s, 4 Bt 7s and 2 T-34s remaining and 'is no longer a mechanized formation. Its motorized infantry are most often simple infantry reinforced by a few tanks.
- ^{c} On 23 July 1941 Major General Lelyushenko reported that the 21st Mechanized Corps had suffered 6,284 casualties, or 60% of its combat strength during the first month of combat.
