= 28th Tank Division =

28th Tank Division (February 1941 – December 13, 1941)
- Active: 1941
- Country: Soviet Union
- Branch: Red Army
- Type: Division
- Role: Armor
- Engagements: Operation Barbarossa; Battle of Raseiniai; Baltic operation Leningrad strategic defensive

Commanders
- Notable commanders: Col. Ivan Danilovich Chernyakhovskii; Col. Timofei Semyonovich Orlenko

The 28th Tank Division was an armored division of the Red Army, created during the prewar buildup of forces in the Baltic Special Military District, based on a light tank brigade and a motorized rifle brigade. It fought against German Army Group North during the first months of Operation Barbarossa. It was initially under command of the 12th Mechanized Corps of the 8th Army.

It was notably the first wartime command of Ivan Chernyakhovskii, who went on to lead the 3rd Belorussian Front. The division's tank regiments were largely destroyed in the first battles, but not without inflicting losses themselves. The remnants fell back through Latvia and Estonia, receiving enough reinforcements and replacements to remain combat-effective. It served well at Novgorod and in the early fighting around Demyansk as part of the 27th Army, but in November, the Stavka ordered its conversion to the 241st Rifle Division.

== Formation ==
The division was based on the 27th Light Tank Brigade and the 2nd Motorized Rifle Brigade. On June 22, it was in the second echelon of 12th Mechanized Corps and was located in Lithuania, to the west of Šiauliai. At this time, its order of battle was as follows:

- 55th Tank Regiment (3 battalions, 30-40 tanks each)
- 56th Tank Regiment (3 battalions, 30-40 tanks each)
- 28th Motorized Rifle Regiment (3 battalions)
- 28th Motorized Howitzer Regiment (1 light, 1 medium battalion)
- 28th Reconnaissance Battalion (1 armored car battalion, 1 tank company with 6 T-26 tanks)
- 28th Motorized Pontoon Battalion
- 28th Antiaircraft Battalion
- 28th Signal Battalion
- 28th Medical/Sanitation Battalion
- 28th Motor Transport Battalion
- 28th Repair and Restoration Battalion
- 28th Regulatory Company
- 28th Motorized Field Bakery
- 838th Field Postal Station
- 689th Field Office of the State Bank

The division was nearly complete in artillery and personnel, but had no modern (T-34, KV-1) tanks; its equipment consisted of about 230 light tanks, mostly BT-5 and BT-7 types, plus a "handful" of old T-28 medium tanks. At the outset of the German invasion, the Baltic Special Military District became the Northwestern Front, and the 12th Mechanized contained the 28th and 23rd Tank Divisions, 202nd Mechanized Division, and 10th Motorcycle Regiment.

=== Battle of Raseiniai ===
The 28th Motorized Rifle Regiment was separated from the rest of the division and went into battle independently along the Baltic coast. On June 24, it was directed to Liepāja in order to rescue the 67th Rifle Division from encirclement. The remainder of the division moved out of its concentration area late on the 22nd in order to strike the XXXXI Motorized Corps, which had already broken through the frontier defenses. The Front commander, Col. Gen. F. I. Kuznetsov, ordered his 3rd and 12th Mechanized Corps to counterattack.

Maj. Boris Petrovich Popov was the deputy commander of the 55th Tank Regiment. Late on June 23, at the village of Kaltinenai near Šiauliai, he led a group of 17 BT-7 tanks, which took up a defensive line for several hours. After repelling several German tank attacks, he led his remaining forces into a counterattack, which broke into the German positions and inflicted losses. Popov himself (as tank commander, he also operated the 45mm gun and the machine gun) accounted for four guns destroyed and up to 30 German infantry either killed by gunfire or crushed by the vehicle's tracks. When the tank was hit and caught fire, he ordered his two crewmen to abandon it while he covered their retreat with gunfire. He was killed soon after as he tried to leave the tank as well; he was buried in the military cemetery in Šiauliai. On July 25, he was posthumously made a Hero of the Soviet Union, one of the first Red Army soldiers so recognized following the German invasion.

Despite Popov's heroism, the two tank divisions were in a very poor position, having been committed piecemeal without infantry support, lacking sufficient ammunition and fuel, and with little awareness of German movements or intentions. In three days of heavy but confused fighting, the two divisions were decimated by antitank fire from the I Army Corps' 11th and 21st Infantry Divisions and air attacks, losing 704 of the 749 tanks they fielded on June 22. The Corps overall would lose 11,832 of its 28,832 personnel during the first two weeks of combat. Utterly overwhelmed, the 28th withdrew northward in disorder. By late on June 25, Kuznetsov's counterattacks had failed and his surviving forces were in full retreat toward Šiauliai, Riga and Švenčionys, leaving the Daugavpils region with its important crossing sites along the Daugava River completely unprotected. The advance of the LVI Motorized Corps separated the 8th Army from the 11th Army to its east.

== Defense of Leningrad ==
As of July 1, the 202nd Motorized had left the 12th Mechanized and was under command of the 11th Army, but at some point it detached its 125th Tank Regiment to the 28th to give the division some semblance of tank strength. By July 10, the 202nd had returned to the 12th Mechanized. Under the terms of Stavka Directive No. 01 of July 15, the mechanized corps were abolished and most of the motorized divisions were redesignated as regular rifle divisions; the surviving tank divisions were retained at a reduced authorization of 217 tanks each. Despite this, on August 1, the 12th Mechanized was still listed as being under direct command of Northwestern Front with the 23rd and 28th Divisions and 125th Regiment.

=== Novgorod and Demyansk ===
Aleksandr Konstantinovich Pankratov was a junior politruk of the 125th Tank Regiment. In the fighting for Novgorod, the Kirillov Monastery was being used as an observation point by the German forces. On the night of August 24/25, soldiers of the regiment, fighting as infantry, launched a covert attack against this position, but were discovered and subjected to heavy defensive fire. After his company commander was killed, Pankratov took over effective leadership and attempted to destroy a machine gun post with grenades. When this failed, he used his own body to block the embrasure; he was killed instantly, but his act allowed his men to close on the position and eliminate it. The company now rose to the attack and captured the monastery. This sort of deed later became known as the "Matrosov feat", named for the man who was believed to have been the first to do so (in February 1943), but in fact Pankratov's act preceded Matrosov's by a year and a half. On March 16, 1942, Pankratov would become a posthumous Hero of the Soviet Union.

Colonel Chernyakhovskii left the division on August 27, handing it over to Col. Timofei Semyonovich Orlenko. Chernyakhovskii took over the 241st Rifle Division on December 13 and then went on to corps and army commands until reaching the rank of army general and command of the 3rd Belorussian Front in 1944. He died of wounds in February 1945 in East Prussia after being twice awarded the Gold Star of a Hero of the Soviet Union. As of the beginning of September, the 28th and 3rd Tank Divisions formed the Novgorod Operational Group under Northwestern Front. On September 1, Colonel Orlenko left the division, just days after his appointment, and its leadership became obscure over the next few months. The 3rd NKVD Motorized Rifle Regiment came under command of the division on September 14. By October 1, it had been assigned to 27th Army.

Under pressure from the LVI Motorized Corps, the overextended 34th Army had been forced back across the Lovat River in September. The German force captured the town of Demyansk, although the 11th and 27th Armies held firm on the flanks. The German corps was in a ludicrous position, reliant on a 90km-long dirt road through swamps for supplies from its railhead at Staraya Russa. The panzers were soon relieved by the II Army Corps, but this was forced over to the defensive once the first snow fell. As of the beginning of November the 28th was still listed as being part of 27th Army, but during the month it began its reformation into the 241st Rifle Division, appearing under that designation by the start of December, although according to Grylev (see Bibliography), this was not complete until December 13, which is also the date Chernyakhovskii returned to command.
