= 12th Mechanized Corps =

- Active: March–August 1941
- Country: Soviet Union
- Branch: Armoured Forces
- Type: Mechanized Corps
- Engagements: Baltic Operation (1941); Battle of Raseiniai; Leningrad Strategic Defensive Operation

Commanders
- Notable commanders: Major General N.M.Shestopalov; Colonel Grinberg; Ivan Korovnikov

The 12th Mechanized Corps was a formation in the Soviet Red Army during the Second World War.

Formed in March 1941 in response to the German victories in the West, it served with the 8th Army and was held in reserve near Šiauliai in Soviet-occupied Lithuania 75 km northwest of Kaunas^{a} in the Special Baltic Military District. Under the command of Major General N.M.Shestopalov when the German Operation Barbarossa began in June 1941, it initially consisted of the 23rd and 28th Tank Divisions and the 202nd Mechanized Division. After the invasion began the Special Baltic Military District was renamed Northwestern Front, commanded by Colonel General Kutznetsov. The front fielded the 8th and 11th Armies along with the 27th Army in its second echelon. The 12th Mechanized was heavily engaged in the first battles of Operation Barbarossa, particularly during the Baltic Operation (1941) and at the Battle of Raseiniai, and by early July it had virtually ceased to exist as a formation, although remnants rejoined Soviet lines later. ^{b} ^{c}

By the end of 22 June, the German armoured spearheads had crossed the Niemen and penetrated 80 kilometres (50 mi). The next day, Kutznetsov committed his armoured forces to battle.

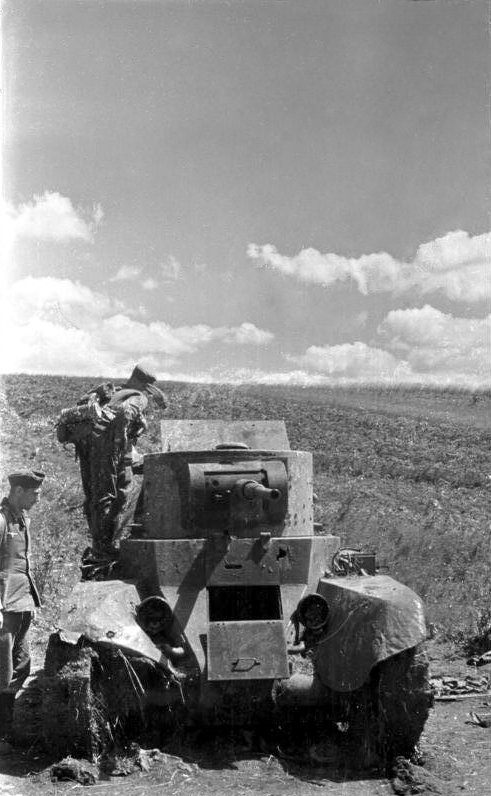
A BT 7 Destroyed in Russia in 1941

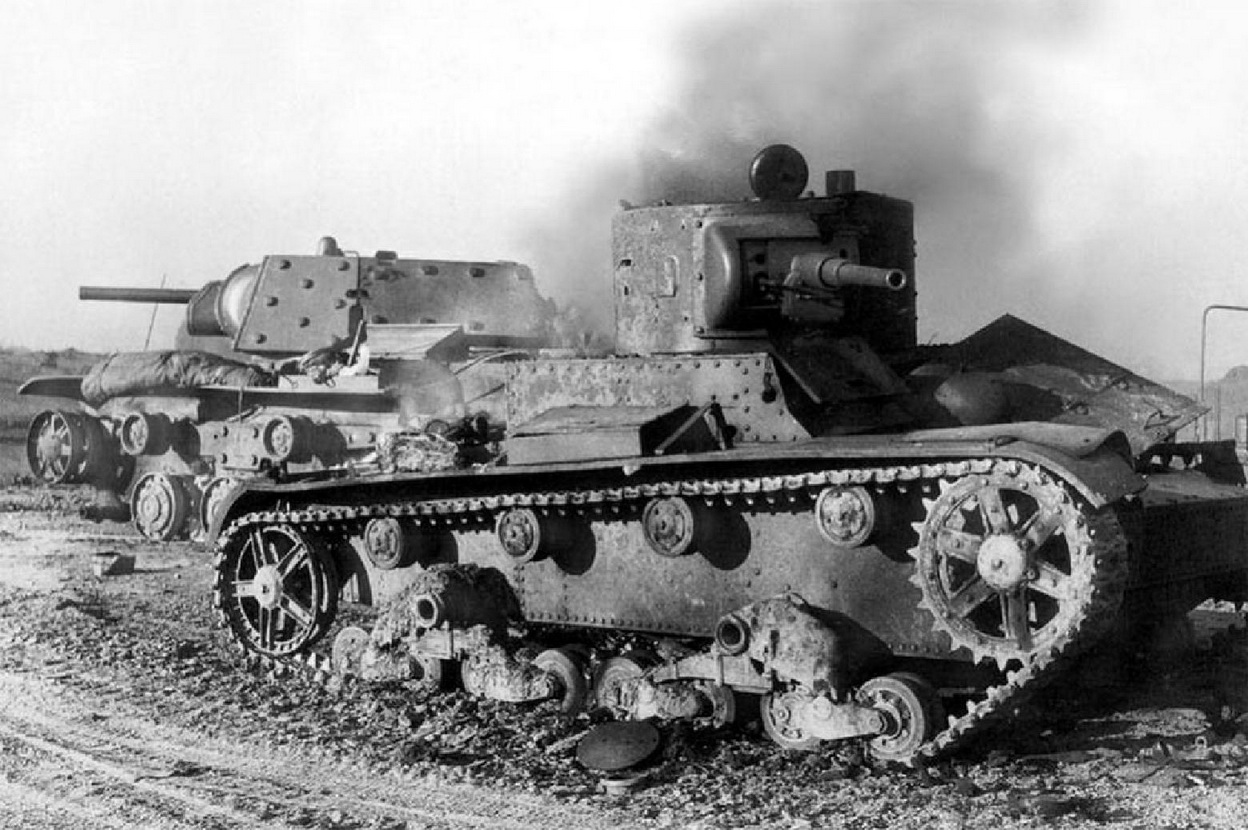
A T-26 lies smoking with a KV-1 behind in Russia in 1941

Near Raseiniai, the XLI Panzer Corps was counter-attacked by the tanks of the Soviet 3rd and 12th Mechanised Corps. But this concentration of Soviet armour was detected by the Luftwaffe, which immediately directed heavy air attacks from Fliegerkorps I Ju 88s against tank columns of the 12th Mechanised Corps south-west of Šiauliai. These attacks went in unopposed by any Soviet fighters and were carried out with great success. The Soviet 23rd Tank Division sustained particularly severe losses, with 40 tanks or lorries set ablaze. On 25 June, the Germans reportedly destroyed another 30 tanks and 50 lorries. The 28th Tank Division alone lost 84 tanks. The battle would last four days. After escaping the encirclement at Raseiniai and making a fighting retreat through Estonia during July, the remnants of the 12th Mechanized Corps were disbanded in August 1941.

However, the 28th Tank Division was reported as part of the Novgorod Operational Group (seemingly a reformation of the 1939-40 Novgorod Army Operational Group) on 1 September 1941, while the 202nd Rifle Division was reported with 11th Army

== Footnotes ==
- ^{a} On 22 June 1941 the 12th Mechanized Corps consisted of 28,832 soldiers, 749 tanks including only lighter Soviet T-26, BT Series models, plus 23 armoured cars, 92 artillery guns, 221 mortars, 2531 vehicles, 194 tractors and 39 motorcycles.
- ^{b} Colonel Grinberg, who was the temporary commander of the 12th Mechanized Corps after the death of his corps' original commander Major General Shestopalov, reported on 29 July that the strength of his corps had fallen to under 17,000 men after the first two weeks of combat.
- ^{c} On 11 July 1941 Colonel P Poluboiarov, from the Northwestern Front armoured directorate, reported that the 12th Mechanized Corps had been in combat for 12 days and had been committed initially in large formations without infantry support or cooperation from artillery and air support. Subsequently, committed in local counter-attacks, it had only '80 worn out tanks and 15 to 17 armoured cars in total in both tank divisions'.
