= Baltic operation =

1941 German invasion of the Baltic states

Baltic Operation (1941)
- Part of Operation Barbarossa during the Eastern Front of World War II
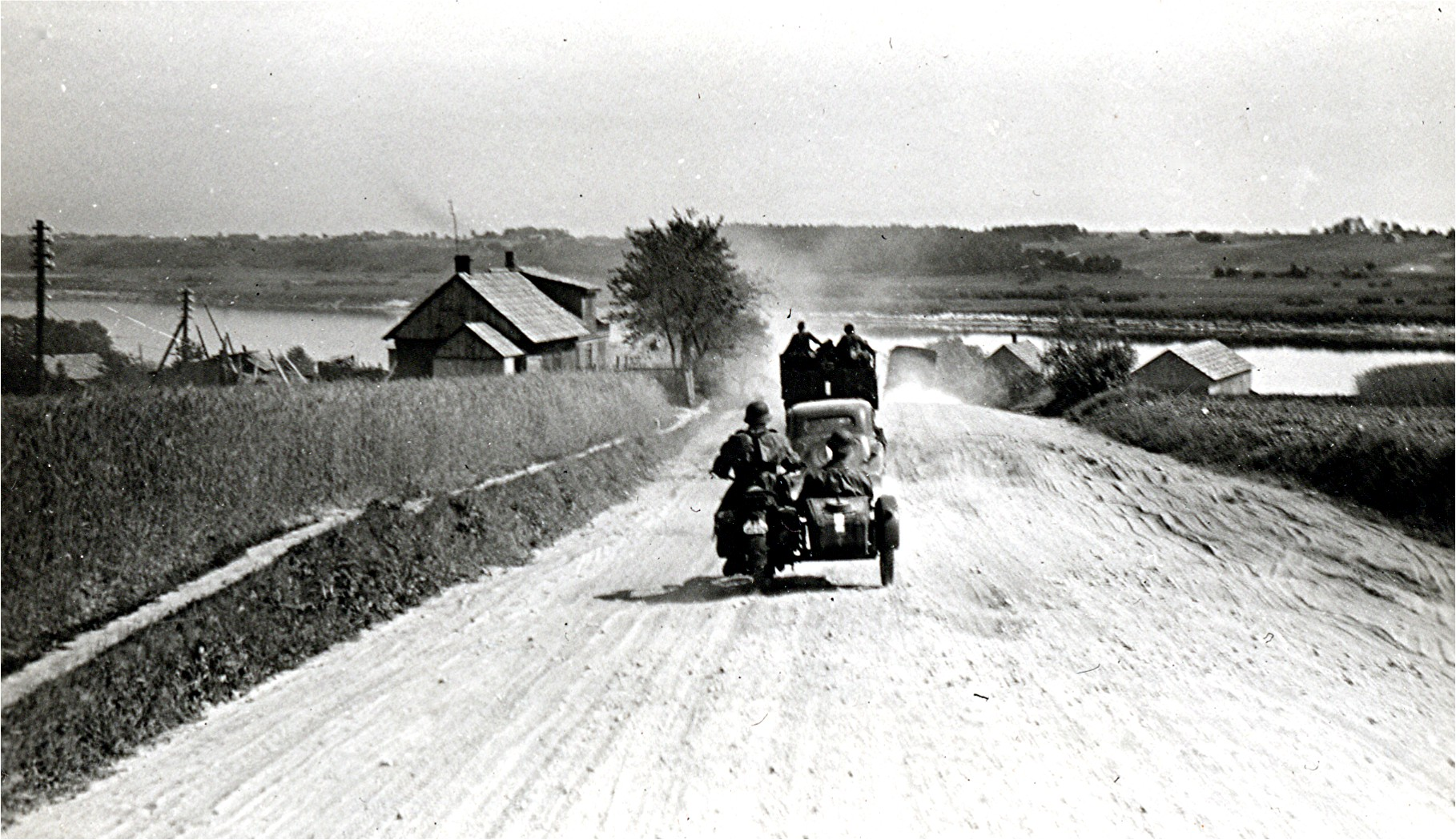
- German troops after crossing the Neman (Memel) into the Lithuanian SSR, 22 June 1941
Date	22 June – 9 July 1941
Location	Baltic states, USSR
Result	German victory: Successful German offensive; Lithuania, Latvia, Estonia, and parts of western Byelorussia placed under a civilian occupation government under Reichskommissariat Ostland

Belligerents
Germany	Soviet Union

Commanders and leaders
Wilhelm R. von Leeb; Georg von Küchler; Ernst Busch; Erich Hoepner; Alfred Keller	Fyodor Kuznetsov; Pyotr Sobennikov; Vasili Morozov; Nikolai Berzarin; Gustav Jonson

Units involved
Army Group North: 18th Army; 16th Army; 4th Panzer Group; Luftflotte 1; 3rd Panzer Group (parts)	Northwestern Front: 8th Army; 11th Army; 27th Army

Strength
655,000; 1,389 tanks 7,673 artillery pieces 1,070 aircraft	786,000; 1,393 tanks 5,573 artillery pieces 1,210 aircraft

Casualties and losses
4,878 killed 14,976 wounded	75,202 killed 13,284 wounded 2,523 tanks & SPGs destroyed 990 aircraft destroyed Total: 88,486 casualties

The Baltic strategic defensive operation (Russian: Прибалтийская стратегическая оборонительная операция, romanized: Pribaltiyskaya strategicheskaya oboronitel'naya operatsiya) encompassed the operations of the Red Army from 22 June to 9 July 1941 conducted over the territories of Soviet-occupied Lithuania, Latvia, and Estonia in response to the offensive launched by the Wehrmacht in Operation Barbarossa.

== Operational parts ==
The operation consisted of three distinct smaller operations

Border defensive battles (22–24 June 1941)

Battle of Raseiniai also known as the Kaunas counterattack

Šiauliai counter-offensive operation (24–27 June 1941)
Defense of the Hanko Naval Base (22 June–2 December 1941)

== Execution ==
The principal Red Army formations of the operation were the Northwestern Front and the Baltic Fleet, with the major ground forces consisting of the 8th (commander General Major Pyotr Sobennikov), 11th (commander Lieutenant General Vasily Morozov) and later 27th Armies.

The operation was conducted after the forces of the Baltic Special Military District were alerted in the morning of 22 June 1941 following a surprise attack by the German Wehrmacht's Army Group North which consisted of the 18th, 16th Field Armies and the 4th Panzer Group, and elements of the 3rd Panzer Group, supported by the Luftflotte 1.

On 22 June, the Soviet 8th Army was positioned in northern Lithuania opposed by the German 18th Army. The Soviet 11th Army defended the rest of the Lithuanian border with East Prussia and sought to contain the attacks of the German 16th Army and the 4th Panzer Group.

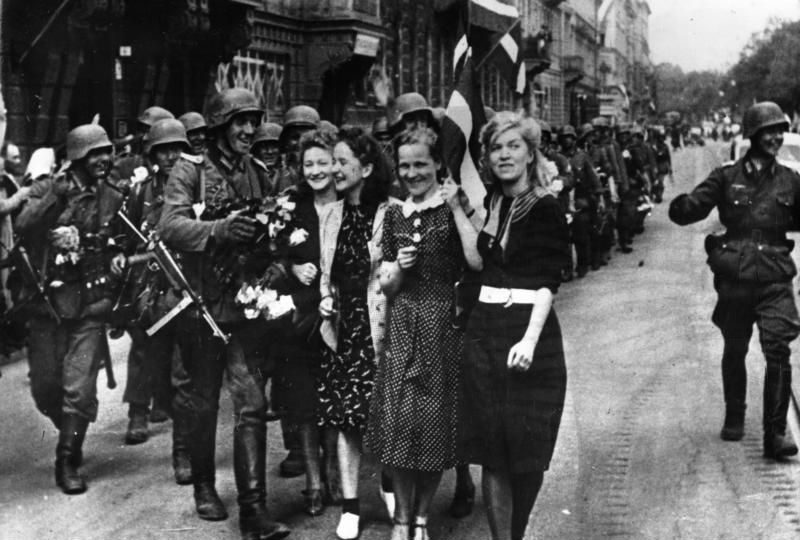
German soldiers and local women in Riga, Latvia

While the Soviet 8th Army retreated along the Jelgava–Riga–Tartu–Narva–Pskov direction, the Soviet 11th Army sought to initially hold the Kaunas and Vilnius sector of the front, but was forced to retreat along the Daugavpils–Pskov–Novgorod axis. These withdrawals, although costly in losses of personnel and materiel, avoided major encirclements experienced by the fronts to the south, and succeeded in delaying Army Group North sufficiently to allow Soviet forces time to prepare the defense of Leningrad. Many of the soldiers who had participated in the operation were rerouted to defend Leningrad or Moscow.

The operation was not a single continuous withdrawal, but was punctuated by short-lived counterattacks, counterstrokes or counteroffensives.

== Subordinate Red Army formations ==
The subordinate formations and units of the Armies were:

- 8th Army (commanded by Major general Pyotr Sobennikov)
  - 10th Rifle Corps
    - 10th Rifle Division
    - 48th Rifle Division
    - 90th Rifle Division
  - 11th Rifle Corps
    - 11th Rifle Division
    - 125th Rifle Division
  - 12th Mechanised Corps
    - 23rd Tank Division
    - 28th Tank Division
    - 202nd Motorised Division
  - 9th Anti-Tank Artillery Brigade
- 11th Army (commanded by Lieutenant general Vasili Morozov)
  - 16th Rifle Corps
    - 5th Rifle Division
    - 33rd Rifle Division
    - 188th Rifle Division
  - 29th Rifle Corps
    - 179th Rifle Division
    - 184th Rifle Division
  - 3rd Mechanised Corps
    - 2nd Tank Division
    - 5th Tank Division
    - 84th Motorised Division
  - 23rd Rifle Division
  - 126th Rifle Division
  - 128th Rifle Division
- 27th Army (commanded by Major general Nikolai Berzarin)
  - 22nd Rifle Corps
    - 180th Rifle Division
    - 182nd Rifle Division
  - 24th Rifle Corps
    - 181st Rifle Division
    - 183rd Rifle Division
- 16th Rifle Division
- 67th Rifle Division
- 3rd Separate Rifle Brigade

Front subordination

- 65th Rifle Corps
  - 11th Rifle Division
  - 16th Rifle Division
- 5th Airborne Corps (2nd, 10th and 201st Airborne Brigades)
- Northwestern Front Air Force (commanded by L.P. Ionov)
  - 4th, 6th, 7th, 8th and 57th Mixed Aviation Divisions
- 10th Anti-Tank Artillery Brigade
- 10th, 12th and 14th Air Defence Brigades
- 110th, 402nd and 429th High Power Artillery Regiments
- units and subunits of support troops
- 1st Long Range Bomber Corps of the Reserve of the Supreme High Command (Stavka Reserve)

== Aftermath ==
The Soviet forces were defeated and forced to fall back. The next operation, according to the Soviet official history, was the Leningrad strategic defensive operation (10 July-30 September 1941), which attempted to establish a stable front along the Narva–Novgorod line.

The German victory began the German occupation of the Baltic states during World War II.

== Bibliography ==
- Bishop, Chris (2005). The Military Atlas of World War II. London: Igloo Books. ISBN 1-904687-53-9.
- Glantz, David M. (2005). Colossus reborn: The Red Army at war 1941-1943. Lawrence: University Press of Kansas. ISBN 0-7006-1353-6.
- Krivosheev, Grigori F. (1997). Soviet Casualties and Combat Losses in the Twentieth Century. London: Greenhill Books. ISBN 1-85367-280-7.
- Wagner, Ray (1973). The Soviet Air Force in World War II: the official history. Melbourne: Wren Publishing. ISBN 0-85885-194-6.
