= 5th Rifle Division (Soviet Union) =

- 5-я стрелковая дивизия
- Active: 1918–1942 (1st formation); 1942–1946 (2nd formation)
- Country: Soviet Union
- Branch: Red Army
- Type: Infantry
- Size: Division
- Garrison/HQ: Vitebsk (1945–1946)
- Engagements: Russian Civil War; Eastern Front counteroffensive; Polish–Soviet War; Battle of Warsaw; World War II; Invasion of Poland; Eastern Front; Baltic Operation; Leningrad Strategic Defensive; Battle of Moscow; Battle of Rzhev; Operation Kutuzov; Battle of the Dnieper; Operation Bagration; East Prussian Offensive; Berlin Offensive
- Decorations: Order of Lenin (2nd formation); Order of the Red Banner (2nd formation); Order of Suvorov, 2nd class (2nd formation); Order of Kutuzov, 2nd class (2nd formation)
- Battle honours: Vitebsk (1st formation); On behalf of the Czechoslovak Proletariat (1st formation); Orel (2nd formation)

The 5th Rifle Division (Russian: 5-я стрелковая дивизия) was an infantry division of the Soviet Union's Red Army, formed twice. The division was formed in 1918, initially as the 2nd Penza Infantry Division. After becoming the 5th Rifle Division a month later, it fought in the Counteroffensive of Eastern Front in spring 1919 and later operations in Siberia. In the spring of 1920, the division was relocated west and fought in the Polish–Soviet War, participating in the Battle of Warsaw. The division was awarded the Honorary Revolutionary Red Banner for its actions during the wars in 1929. In September 1939, it fought in the Soviet invasion of Poland and was then sent to Lithuania under the Soviet–Lithuanian Mutual Assistance Treaty. After Operation Barbarossa, the division fought in the Baltic Operation and the Leningrad Strategic Defensive. During the winter of 1941-1942, it participated in the Battle of Moscow, fighting in the Kalinin (Tver) area. During the summer of 1942, the division fought in the Rzhev-Vyazma Offensive and became the 44th Guards Rifle Division for its actions there on 5 October.

Just more than a week later, the 5th Rifle Division was reformed from a rifle brigade in the Moscow Military District. In February 1943, the division fought in offensives in the Mtsensk and Tver areas. In July, it fought in Operation Kutuzov and was awarded the honorific "Orel" after it captured the city on 4 August. Between September and October, it fought in the Bryansk Offensive. It continued to advance and participated in the Gomel-Rechitsa Offensive and reached the Dnieper before it went on the defensive in early December. In February 1944, the division fought in the Rogachev-Zhlobin Offensive and was awarded the Order of the Red Banner for its actions. From June 1944, the division fought in Operation Bagration, It was awarded the Order of Suvorov 2nd class for breaking through German defenses on the Drut River. It the fought in the Minsk Offensive and Belostock Offensive. For its capture of Vawkavysk on 14 July, the division received the Order of Kutuzov 2nd class. The division continued its advance and reached the Narew in August. From then until November, it fought in the battle for the Narew bridgeheads. In 1945, the division fought in the Mlawa-Elbing Offensive and the Berlin Offensive. It was awarded the Order of Lenin for its actions. The division was disbanded in June 1946.

== History ==
=== First formation ===
The division was initially formed in September 1918 as the 2nd Penza Infantry Division. It was later renamed as the 5th Rifle Division (October 1918), Saratov (1920), Vitebsk (1921), and 'in the name of the Czechoslovak Proletariat' (1925). For successful operations during the Russian Civil War it was awarded the Honourable Revolutionary Red Banner in 1929.

In August 1939 it was deployed to the Belorussian Special Military District. On September 17, 1939, the division was assigned to the 4th Rifle Corps, Third Army of the Belorussian Front. On October 2, 1939, the division was reassigned to the 10th Rifle Corps, Third Army of the Belorussian Front. In September–October 1939 it took part in the Soviet invasion of Poland. From October 1939 it was deployed in Lithuania according to the Soviet–Lithuanian Mutual Assistance Treaty. Since July 1940 it was stationed in the Baltic Military District.

During the Second World War, the division was part of the Eleventh Army (where it was part of 16th Rifle Corps at the outbreak of the war), 27th Army, Soviet First Guards Army and 65th Army. As of October 1, 1941, the division was a part of the 31st Army of the Soviet Reserve Front. The division participated in defensive fights on as part of the Soviet Western Front, in Moscow and at the Battle of Stalingrad, in fights for Donbass and clearing of Left-bank Ukraine, in the Gomel-Rechitsa, Belarus, Mlawo-Elbing, East Pomerania and the Berlin offensive operations.

For its service in battle the division became the 44th Guards Rifle Division on October 5, 1942. It was later awarded the honourable name "Baranovichskaya" ("Барановичская"; on July 27, 1944), the Order of Lenin and Order of Suvorov, 2nd degree. Twelve thousand of its soldiers were awarded awards and medals and 22 were named Heroes of the Soviet Union.

It was stationed in Poland with the 105th Rifle Corps after the end of the war and disbanded in June 1946.

Force Composition, October 1939

- 142nd Rifle Regiment
- 190th Rifle Regiment
- 336th Rifle Regiment
- 27th Light Artillery Regiment
- 174th Howitzer Regiment

=== Second formation ===
The 5th Rifle Division was reformed on 13 October 1942 from the 109th Rifle Brigade.

On 1 May 1945 it was part of 40th Rifle Corps (5th Rifle Division, 129th, and 169th Rifle Divisions), as part of 3rd Army (Soviet Union).

Both the corps and its three divisions, including the 5th Rifle, were withdrawn to Belorussia, and 40th Rifle Corps headquarters and 5th Rifle Division were stationed at Vitebsk. There they were disbanded in June 1946.

== See also ==
- List of Soviet Union divisions 1917–1945
