= 180th Rifle Division =

Infantry division of the Soviet Red Army

180th Rifle Division 180th Motor Rifle Division
- Active: 1940–1989
- Country: Soviet Union
- Branch: Soviet Army
- Type: Infantry
- Role: Motorized Infantry
- Size: Division
- Garrison/HQ: Bilhorod-Dnistrovsky (2nd formation)
- Engagements: World War II: Baltic Operation; Demyansk Pocket; Ostrogozhsk–Rossosh Offensive; Battle of Kiev; First Jassy–Kishinev Offensive; Siege of Budapest
- Decorations: Order of the Red Banner (2nd formation) Order of Suvorov 2nd class (2nd formation) Order of Kutuzov 2nd class (2nd formation)
- Battle honours: Kiev (2nd formation)

Commanders
- Notable commanders: Serafim Merkulov

The 180th Rifle Division was an infantry division of the Soviet Red Army, formed thrice.

The division was first formed in September 1939 but this unit was disbanded a few months later. It was reformed in August 1940 from Estonian personnel after the Soviet occupation of that country. The first wartime formation of the division became the 28th Guards Rifle Division in May 1942. The second wartime formation was formed in June 1942, and served through the rest of the war.

The division briefly became the 14th Rifle Division in 1955, then 88th Motor Rifle Division 1957, but became 180th Kiev Red Banner Orders of Suvorov and Kutuzov Motor Rifle Division in 1965 and remained under that title until the 1990s. After 1992 became Ukrainian 27th Mechanized Brigade. The 27th Mechanized Brigade was disbanded, most likely in the early 2000s.

== First formation ==
The 180th Rifle Division was formed in September 1939 by the expansion of a regiment of the 6th Rifle Division in the Oryol Military District, but was disbanded in January 1940.

The 180th Rifle Division was formed again during August and September 1940 in the Baltic Special Military District. It was part of the 22nd Territorial Rifle Corps (Estonian) and was composed of Estonian People's Force personnel. It was commanded by Major General Richard Tomberg, the former commander of the Estonian Air Force. On 3 June 1941, Major General Ivan Missan replaced Tomberg in command. On 22 June 1941, it was based in Võru, which was in the rear area. While moving forward, it was attacked by German aircraft. The division entered combat on 26 June against the LVI Panzer Corps, which was attacking the 27th Army in the Daugava region. On 9 July, the division and its parent formation, the 22nd Rifle Corps, were transferred from the 27th Army to the 11th Army. It fought in defensive battles, making counterattacks in Soltsy, Porkhov and Novorzhev. In August it had retreated back to the Staraya Russa area. In September 1941, the division fought in the Demyansk Defensive Operation. It then fought in the Demyansk Pocket in early 1942. On 3 May 1942, the division became the 28th Guards Rifle Division for its actions.

== Second formation ==
The second formation of the division was created at Cherepovets in June 1942 from the 41st Rifle Brigade. It fought at Kiev, Târgu Frumos, and Budapest. The division was part of the 53rd Army of the 2nd Ukrainian Front in May 1945. During the war, the division was awarded the honorific Kiev for its actions during the 1943 capture of Kiev. It was awarded the Order of the Red Banner, the Order of Suvorov 2nd class and the Order of Kutuzov 2nd class.

== Postwar ==
In 1955, it became the 14th Rifle Division. On 17 May 1957, the 88th Motor Rifle Division was activated from the 14th Rifle Division in Bilhorod-Dnistrovskyi, part of the 14th Guards Army. On 19 February 1962, the 276th Separate Equipment Maintenance and Recovery Battalion was activated along with the 244th Separate Missile Battalion.

On 17 November 1964, the 88th Motor Rifle Division became the 180th Motor Rifle Division, restoring its World War II numbering. In 1967, the 14th Army became the 14th Guards Army. On 15 November 1972, the 1303rd Separate Anti-Tank Artillery Battalion was activated along with a separate Reactive Artillery Battalion. In 1980, the Separate Motor Transport Battalion became the 1041st Separate Material Supply Battalion. During the same year, the 136th Artillery Regiment absorbed the reactive artillery battalion. During the Cold War, the division was maintained at 16% strength. On 1 December 1989, the division was ordered to become the 5775th Weapons and Equipment Storage Base, but this was appears to have been delayed to at least 1991. In 1990, CFE treaty data showed the division had 61 T-64 tanks, 13 T-54 tanks and 12 BM-21 Grad multiple rocket launchers, among other equipment. In January 1992, the storage base was taken over by Ukraine.

It became the 27th Separate Mechanized Brigade and was subordinated to the 1st Airmobile Division. The brigade was disbanded in 2004.

== Composition ==
The 180th Rifle Division's first formation included the following units.

21st Rifle Regiment
42nd Rifle Regiment
86th Rifle Regiment
627th Artillery Regiment
629th Howitzer Artillery Regiment (to 4 October 1941)
15th Separate Anti-Tank Battalion
150th Separate Anti-Aircraft Artillery Battalion (later 321st Separate Anti-Aircraft Battery)
90th Reconnaissance Company (later 90th Reconnaissance Battalion)
33rd Sapper Battalion
137th Separate Communications Battalion
9th Medical Battalion
182nd Separate Chemical Defence Company
383rd Road Transport Battalion (later 383rd Trucking Company)
440th Field Bakery
446th Divisional Veterinary Hospital
787th Field Post Office
467th Field Ticket Office of the State Bank

The 180th Motor Rifle Division's second formation was composed of the following units.

21st Rifle Regiment
42nd Rifle Regiment
86th Rifle Regiment
627th Artillery Regiment
15th Separate Anti-Tank Battalion
250th Machine-Gun Battalion (to 10 June 1943)
90th Intelligence Company
33rd Sapper Battalion
866 Separate Communications Battalion (formerly 157th Separate Communications Battalion, 179th Separate Communications Company)
9th Medical Battalion
182nd Separate Chemical Defence Company
28th Road Transport Company
140th Field Baker
46th Divisional Veterinary Hospital
1595th Field Post Office
1643rd Field Ticket Office of the State Bank

The 180th Motor Rifle Division was composed of the following units in 1988.

42nd Motor Rifle Regiment
325th Motor Rifle Regiment
326th Motor Rifle Regiment
166th Tank Regiment
136th Artillery Regiment
134th Anti-Aircraft Missile Regiment
244th Separate Missile Battalion
1303rd Separate Anti-Tank Artillery Battalion
104th Separate Reconnaissance Battalion
33rd Separate Engineer-Sapper Battalion
866th Separate Communications Battalion
Separate Chemical Defence Company
276th Separate Equipment Maintenance and Recovery Battalion
Separate Medical Battalion
1041st Separate Material Supply Battalion
