= Kholm, Russia =

Kholm (Russian: Холм; lit. hill) is the name of several inhabited localities in Russia.

Urban localities

- Kholm, Kholmsky District, Novgorod Oblast, a town in Kholmsky District of Novgorod Oblast

Rural localities

- Kholm, Kaluga Oblast, a selo in Khvastovichsky District of Kaluga Oblast
- Kholm, Borovichsky District, Novgorod Oblast, a village in Borovichsky District of Novgorod Oblast
- Kholm, Lyubytinsky District, Novgorod Oblast, a village in Lyubytinsky District of Novgorod Oblast
- Kholm, Arkhangelsk Oblast, a village in Arkhangelsk Oblast
- Kholm, name of several other rural localities
