= Sergei Trofimenko =

Soviet colonel general (1899–1953)

Sergei Georgievich Trofimenko
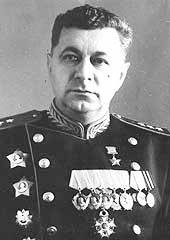
- Trofimenko in the late 1940s or early 1950s
- Born: September 22, 1899; Ryovny, Trubchevsky Uyezd, Oryol Governorate, Russian Empire
- Died: 16 October 1953 (aged 54) Moscow, Soviet Union
- Allegiance: Russian SFSR; Soviet Union
- Branch: Red Army (later Soviet Army)
- Service years: 1919–1953
- Rank: Colonel general
- Commands: Central Asian Military District; 53rd Army; Medvezhyegorsk Operational Group; 32nd Army; 7th Army; 27th Army; Tbilisi Military District; Belorussian Military District; North Caucasus Military District
- Conflicts: Russian Civil War; World War II; Invasion of Poland; Winter War; Eastern Front
- Awards: Hero of the Soviet Union; Order of Lenin (4); Order of the Red Banner (3); Order of Suvorov, 1st class (2); Order of Kutuzov, 1st class; Order of Bogdan Khmelnitsky, 1st class; Commander of the Legion of Merit

Sergei Georgievich Trofimenko (Russian: Сергей Георгиевич Трофименко; 22 September [O.S. 10 September] 1899 – 16 October 1953) was a Soviet military commander, active in the Russian Civil War and the Second World War. His final rank was colonel-general. He had been promoted to major general 4 June 1940, lieutenant-general 13 June 1942, and colonel-general 13 September 1944.

== Early life ==
Trofimenko was born 22 September [O.S. 10 September] 1899 in Ryovny (now in Bryansk Oblast) to a working-class family. He graduated from high school and two-year railway school. With the death of his father, he was head of a family with six brothers and sisters. At age 10 began working in the railway depot Bryansk-2 as a messenger.

== Military career ==
=== Russian Civil War ===
He took an active part in the revolutionary events of 1917 in Bryansk, where the depot was one of the organizers of the Komsomol. In 1918 he joined the Communist Party (b), and when Denikin's army approached the city, he joined the Red Army.

During the Civil War he served as a private, squad leader, platoon leader, and assistant chief of the machine-gun platoon infantry regiment in the 41st Rifle Division, 14th Army. He fought in the South, Southwest, Western Front, fought against the Armed Forces of South Russia, Ukrainian People's Army, and Polish Army.

=== Interwar period ===
In 1926 he graduated from the courses: "Vystrel" in 1932 - the Frunze Military Academy in 1937 - the General Staff Academy.

After September 1923 he served as chief of the machine-gun team, and from February 1924, the military commissar of the 132nd Rifle Regiment, 44th Donetsk Rifle Division in the Ukrainian Military District; from September 1926, commander of an infantry battalion of the 7th Caucasus (then 133rd Rifle, 135th Rifle) Regiment, 45th Rifle Division in the same district after May 1932, chief of staff of the 61st Rifle Division of the Volga Military District; from December 1935, chief of the 1st (operational) staff of that district; from June 1937, of the Kiev military district; from July 1938, chief of staff of Army Group forces Zhitomir; and in September 1939, the 5th Army of the Kiev Special Military District.

== World War II ==
In September 1939 he took part in the campaign in Poland, and was deputy chief of staff of the 7th Army in the Russo-Finnish War.

In August 1940 he was appointed chief of staff of the North Caucasus, from January 1941 to the position of commander of the Central Asian Military District. With the onset of the Great Patriotic War, he went on to command the district, and at the same time, from August to October 1941, the 53rd Army, which took part, with Soviet forces from the Transcaucasus, in the Anglo-Soviet invasion of Iran.

From December 1941 to March 1942 he commanded a task force of impressed prisoners gathered from gulags in the Medvezhiegorsky area (1941–1942) on the Karelian front; from March to June 1942, the 32nd Army; from July 1942 to January 1943, the 7th Army; and from January 1943 until the end of the war, the 27th Army.

Troops under his command participated in defensive battles in Karelia, the Demyansk operations in 1943, the Battle of Kursk and Belgorod-Kharkov operation, in the liberation of Ukraine.

During the Second Jassy–Kishinev Offensive as the 27th Army chief, he effected an attack in the area of the 2nd Ukrainian Front in the Iași area, breaking through the enemy defense in depth and advancing into the breach of the 6th Panzer Army. After Romania switched sides on 23 August 1944, the army under the command of General Trofimenko advanced rapidly into Romania, for the first nine days of fighting passed about three hundred kilometers, while cutting apart the rear of the German-Romanian Army Group South Ukraine; this move took possession of the cities of Adjud, Focșani, Buzău, and Ploiești.

General Trofimenko is thought to be responsible for the great loss of Romanian soldiers, whom he later had in command, during the battle of Oarba de Mureș, in Romania.

By Decree No. 4262 of the Presidium of the Supreme Soviet of September 13, 1944, for good command of troops in Iași-Kishinev operation and for displaying courage and heroism, Lieutenant-General Sergei G. Trofimenko was awarded the title Hero of the Soviet Union with the award of the Order of Lenin and medal "Gold Star" .

=== Post-war service ===
From 1945 to 1946 he was commander of Tbilisi, from 1946 to 1949, Belorussian and from 1949 to 1953, the North Caucasus Military District.

In 1949 he graduated from the higher academic courses at the Voroshilov Higher Military Academy He was chosen deputy to the Supreme Soviet in 1946 and 1953.

Trofimenko died on October 16, 1953, in Moscow, and was buried in the Novodevichy Cemetery.

== Honours and awards ==
- Hero of the Soviet Union
- Four Orders of Lenin
- Order of the Red Banner, three times
- Order of Suvorov, 1st class, twice
- Order of Kutuzov, 1st class
- Order of Bogdan Khmelnitsky, 1st class

A street is named for him in Bryansk, and there is a memorial plaque at the Bryansk locomotive depot-2.
