= Fyodor Kuznetsov =

Soviet general (1898–1961)

- Кузнецов, Фёдор Исидорович
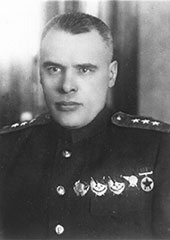
- Born: 29 September 1898; Mogilev Governorate, Russian Empire
- Died: 22 March 1961 (aged 62); Moscow, Russian SFSR, USSR
- Military career
- Allegiance: Russian Empire (1916–1917); Soviet Russia (1917–1922); Soviet Union (1922–1948)
- Branch: Imperial Russian Army; Red Army
- Service years: 1916–1948
- Rank: Colonel General
- Commands: Northwestern Front; Central Front; 21st Army; 51st Army; 61st Army
- Conflicts: World War I Russian Civil War; World War II
- Awards: Order of Lenin

Fyodor Isidorovich Kuznetsov (Russian: Фёдор Иси́дорович Кузнецо́в; 29 September 1898 – 22 March 1961) was a Colonel General and military commander in the Soviet Union.

== Biography ==
Born to a peasant family in Mogilev Governorate (present-day Horki Raion, Mogilev Oblast of Belarus), Kuznetsov served in the Imperial Russian Army during World War I and continued his service in the Bolsheviks' Red Army. During the German-Soviet War, he initially commanded the Northwestern Front during the Baltic Strategic Defensive Operation until 30 June 1941, but was relieved in early August 1941 (replaced by General Major Pyotr Sobennikov). At a Stavka session on 12 August 1941, he was given command of the new 51st Independent Army, but he was replaced by Pavel Batov in October 1941 during the defense of the Crimea. Later he served as the temporary commander of the Central Front (July–August 1941), Chief of Staff of the 28th Army, Deputy Commander of the Western Front, and commander of the 61st Army.

From March 1942 to June 1943, he served as the commanding officer of the Academy of General Staff, and from August 1943 to February 1944 as the Deputy Commander of the Volkhov Front and the Karelian Front. From 1945-1948, he commanded the Ural Military District, retiring due to illness.

He is buried in the Novodevichy Cemetery in Moscow.
