= 33rd Rifle Division =

Red Army and Soviet Army military unit

- Active: 1922–1947; 1955–1956
- Country: Soviet Union
- Branch: Red Army
- Type: Infantry
- Size: Division
- Engagements: World War II; Invasion of Poland; Baltic Operation; Leningrad Strategic Defensive; Toropets–Kholm Offensive; Leningrad-Novgorod Offensive; Tartu Offensive; Riga Offensive; East Pomeranian Offensive; Battle of Berlin
- Decorations: Order of the Red Banner; Order of Suvorov, 2nd class
- Battle honours: Kholm (1st formation); Berlin (1st formation); Smolensk (2nd formation)

Commanders
- Notable commanders: Trifon Shevaldin; Ivan Gribov

The 33rd Rifle Division was a rifle division of the Red Army and Soviet Army, formed twice. The division was formed in 1922 at Samara and moved to Belarus in the next year. It fought in the Soviet invasion of Poland in September 1939 and in the Occupation of Lithuania in June 1940. After Operation Barbarossa, the division fought in the Baltic Operation and Leningrad Strategic Defensive. In January 1942, it fought in the Toropets–Kholm Offensive. The division participated in the Leningrad–Novgorod Offensive, the Pskov-Ostrov Offensive, the Tartu Offensive and the Riga Offensive. In 1945, the division fought in the East Pomeranian Offensive and the Battle of Berlin. The division remained in Germany postwar with the Soviet occupation forces and disbanded in 1947. In 1955, it was reformed from the 215th Rifle Division in the Far East and inherited that division's honorifics, but was disbanded in 1956.

== History ==
=== First formation ===
The 33rd Rifle Division was formed on 29 May 1922 in the area of Samara, Orenburg, and Troitsk from units of the 97th Separate Rifle Brigade of the Trans-Volga Military District; it was assigned to the Volga Military District. On 18 October of that year it received the honorific Samara, and in October 1923 relocated to Belorussia, becoming part of the Western Front (which became the Western Military District in April 1924). In 1925 it became a territorial division. The division was renamed the 33rd Belorussian Rifle Division on 16 January 1934, replacing the Samara honorific. It fought in the Soviet invasion of Poland, advancing into territory annexed as western Belorussia. The division transferred to the Baltic Special Military District in 1940.

Vasily Margelov served with the division's 99th Rifle Regiment as a machine gun platoon commander during 1931 and 1932.

With 16th Rifle Corps of 11th Army on June 22, 1941. Fought vicinity Stalingrad and Berlin. During the Battle of Berlin, it helped capture the Reichstag. With 3rd Shock Army of the 1st Belorussian Front May 1945.

During November and December 1946, the division was disbanded in Germany, still with the 3rd Shock Army.

=== Second formation ===
The division was reformed briefly in the Far East by redesignation of 215th Rifle Division in 1955. It inherited the 215th's honorifics "Smolensk Red Banner Order of Suvorov". There it served with 5th Red Banner Army with headquarters located at Krasny Kut. The division was disbanded on 25 July 1956.
