= Pyotr Sobennikov =

Soviet-Russian military commander

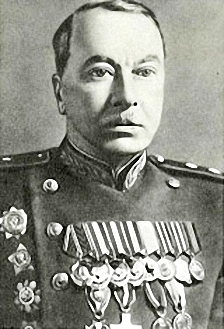
- Born: 13 July 1894; Kronstadt, Russian Empire
- Died: 14 August 1960 (aged 66) Moscow, Soviet Union
- Allegiance: Russian Empire; Soviet Union
- Branch: Imperial Russian Army; Soviet Red Army
- Rank: lieutenant general
- Commands: 8th Army; Northwestern Front; 43rd Army
- Conflicts: World War I; Russian Civil War; World War II; Leningrad Strategic Defensive; Battle of Moscow

Pyotr Petrovich Sobennikov (Russian: Пётр Петро́вич Собе́нников; 13 July 1894 – 1960) was a Soviet general and Army commander.

== Biography ==
He was a veteran of World War I and the Russian Civil War. He was stationed at the Northwestern Front as commander of the 8th Army (March–June 1941). He became head of the Northwestern Front (July–August 1941) and then of the 43rd Army (September–October 1941).

On 16 October 1941, Sobennikov was arrested and sentenced in February 1942 to five years of hard labour in the camps. On this occasion, he was stripped of the Order of the Red Star and the Red Army 20th Anniversary Commemorative Medal. He was eventually pardoned, but demoted.

From November 1942 until the end of the war, he was deputy commander of the 3rd Army. He took part in the Battle of Kursk and the Second Battle of Smolensk near Briansk, in the Gomel-Retchytsa and Rahatchow-Jlobine operations. In 1944, he took part in Operation Bagration in the 1st Belarusian front and towards the end of the war, in the offensives in East Prussia, eastern Germany, as well as the Battle of Berlin.

After the war, from 1955 to 1959, he headed the Special Military School in Solnechnogorsk, a.k.a. the Vystrel course.

He is buried in the Novodevichy Cemetery.

He was a recipient of the Order of Lenin, the Order of the Red Banner, the Order of Bogdan Khmelnitsky (Soviet Union), the Order of Suvorov, and the Order of Kutuzov.

| Preceded by Ivan Bogdanov | Commander of the 43rd Army; 5 September – 10 October 1941 | Succeeded by Stepan Akimov |
