= 67th Rifle Division =

Soviet military division

- 67-я стрелковая дивизия
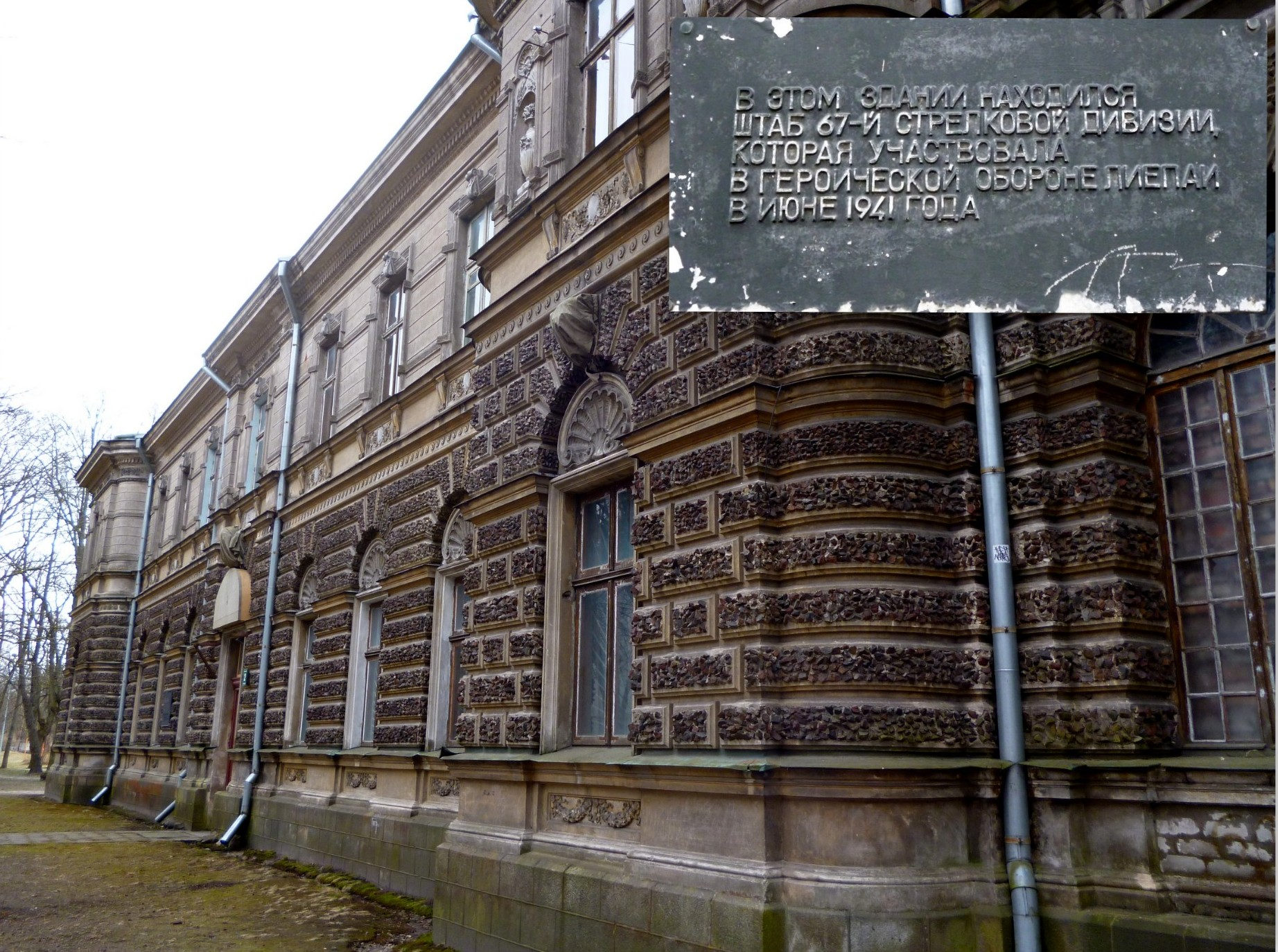
- The unit's headquarters in Liepāja
- Active: 1939-1941
- Country: Soviet Union
- Branch: Red Army; Soviet Army
- Type: Infantry division
- Size: Several corps or divisions
- Garrison/HQ: Liepāja
- Engagements: WWII; Operation Barbarossa

The 67th Rifle Division (Russian: 67-я стрелковая дивизия) was an infantry division of the Red Army. The 20th Rifle Division (territorial defence) was formed from militia brigades in the Leningrad Military District in 1923. On May 21, 1936, it was named the 67th Rifle Division. In June 1941, was part of the 27th Army in the Baltic Special Military District. After being badly battered during the early part of Operation Barbarossa, it was disbanded 19 September 1941.

Re-formed in September 1941. Fought on Finnish front. With 14th Army in northern Norway May 1945.

The 116th Rifle Division was renumbered as the 67th Rifle Division after 1945.

== Structure ==
- 56 Rifle Regiment
- 114 Rifle Regiment
- 281 Rifle Regiment
- 94 Artillery Regiment
- 242 Artillery Regiment
- Smaller units
