= 27th Army (Soviet Union) =

- 27-я армия
- Active: May – December 1941; 1942–1946
- Country: USSR
- Branch: Red Army
- Type: Combined arms
- Size: Field Army
- Engagements: World War II; Baltic Operation; Operation Barbarossa; Demyansk Pocket; Battle of Korsun-Cherkassy; Second Jassy–Kishinev offensive; Battle of Debrecen; Vienna Offensive

Commanders
- Notable commanders: Nikolai Berzarin

The 27th Army (Russian: 27-я армия) was a field army of the Soviet Union's Red Army, which fought in World War II.

== First formation ==
The 27th Army was formed in May 1941, under the command of Major General Nikolai Berzarin. On 22 June 1941 it consisted of the 22nd and 24th Territorial Rifle Corps, the 16th and 67th Rifle Divisions, 3rd Separate Rifle Brigade, two artillery regiments, and two anti-tank regiments. It became part of the Northwestern Front on the outbreak of Operation Barbarossa, fighting in the Soviet defense of the Baltic, known in Soviet historiography as the Baltic Strategic Defensive Operation.

From June to October 1941 the 27th Army fought on the Dvina River, during the Staraya Russa Offensive, and at Kholm and Demyansk. By 1 November 1941 the army's forces had been reduced to the 23rd and 33rd Rifle Divisions, the 613th Artillery Regiment of the Reserve of the Supreme High Command (RVGK), the 28th Tank Division, and three Battalions of engineers.

In December 1941 the first formation of the army was renamed the 4th Shock Army.

== Second formation ==
The army reformed in May 1942, within the Northwestern Front, consisting of five rifle divisions. In April 1943 it was moved into Stavka reserve. From July 1943, it participated in many famous battles, assigned to the Steppe Front, then the Voronezh Front, in the Belgorod-Kharkov operation and the Bukrin bridgehead. From October 1943, it fought in the Kiev offensive (with 1st Ukrainian Front). Thereafter, assigned to the 2nd and 3rd Ukrainian Front, it was part of the Zhitomir–Berdichev Offensive, the Korsun–Shevchenkovsky Offensive, the Uman-Botosani Offensive, the Iassy-Kishinev Offensive, the Battle of Debrecen, and the Vienna Offensive.

After the end of the war, it was ordered withdrawn to Romania by 20 August 1945, and concentrated in the areas of Brăila, Buzău, and Galați in eastern Romania. By November it included the 33rd (78th, 206th, and 337th Rifle Divisions) and the 37th Rifle Corps (163rd, 316th, and 320th Rifle Divisions), as well as the 35th Guards Rifle Corps (66th, 108th, and the 125th Guards Rifle Divisions). Shortly afterwards, the 27th Army was withdrawn to the Carpathian Military District. There, its headquarters was disbanded on 4 August 1946, and its three rifle corps were directly subordinated to the district headquarters.

== Commanders ==
- Major General Nikolai Berzarin (5 May – 25 December 1941)
- Major General Fyodor Ozerov (22 May 1942 – 29 January 1943)
- Lieutenant General Sergei Trofimenko (29 January 1943 – 9 July 1945), Colonel-General in September 1944
- Colonel General Ivan Boldin (9 July 1945 – 5 July 1946)

== Notes ==
=== Bibliography ===
- Glantz, David; Rikmenspoel, Marc J.; McMichael, Scott R.; Foster, Hugh; Myers, Steven; Khonko, Uri; Khonko, Natalya; Bonn, Keith E. (2005). Slaughterhouse: The Handbook of the Eastern Front. Bedford, Pennsylvania: Aberjona Press. ISBN 0-9717650-9-X.
- Feskov, V.I.; Golikov, V.I.; Kalashnikov, K.A.; Slugin, S.A. (2013). Вооруженные силы СССР после Второй Мировой войны: от Красной Армии к Советской [The Armed Forces of the USSR after World War II: From the Red Army to the Soviet: Part 1 Land Forces] (in Russian). Tomsk: Scientific and Technical Literature Publishing. ISBN 9785895035306.
