= Northwestern Front =

Soviet Red Army formation

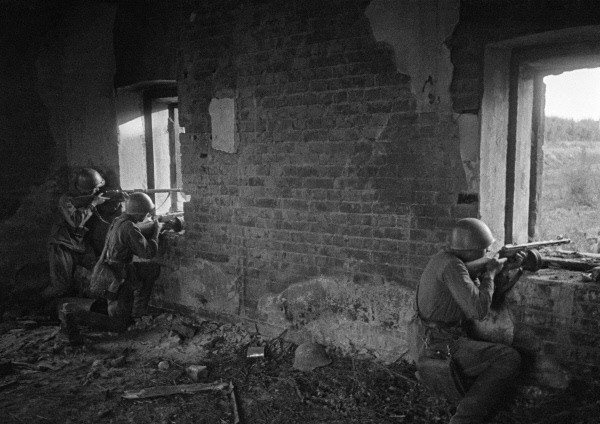
- Soldiers of the North-Western Front in action.
- Active: June 1941 – November 1943
- Country: Soviet Union
- Branch: Red Army
- Type: Army Group Command
- Size: front, i.e. several armies
- Engagements: World War II; Baltic Operation; Leningrad Strategic Defensive; Siege of Leningrad; Toropets–Kholm Offensive; Demyansk Pocket; Operation Polar Star

Commanders
- Notable commanders: Pavel Kurochkin; Semyon Timoshenko

The Northwestern Front (Russian: Северо-Западный фронт, Severo-Zapadnyy front) was a front (army group) of the Red Army during the Winter War and World War II. It was operational with the 7th and 13th Armies during the Winter War. It was re-created on 22 June 1941, the first day of the Eastern Front on the basis of the Baltic Special Military District. On 22 June the Front consisted of the 8th, 11th, and 27th Armies, as well as the 5th Airborne Corps and the headquarters of the 65th Rifle Corps.

== Combat history ==
=== Winter War ===
The staff of the Leningrad Military District.

=== 1941 ===
In the summer of 1941 all elements of the front commanded by General Colonel Fyodor Isodorovich Kuznetsov were involved in heavy fighting in the Baltic Republics and on the approaches and the outskirts of Leningrad. During first 18 days of the war the armies retreated over 450 km into Russia. On 14 July the Soviet 11th Army led a successful counter-offensive from Utogrosh and the Dno district to Sitnya and Soltsi, in which German troops (in particular 8th Panzer Division) suffered heavy losses and had to retreat. The Soviet forces took Soltsi on 16 July, and the German advance to Leningrad and Novgorod was stopped for a while. This offensive had a strong effect for the morale of the Soviet troops. Nevertheless, the German troops were regrouped and refreshed, and on 12 August they renewed their offensive and moved to Novgorod which was taken on 19 August.

At Staraya Russa combat started in July, and in August in the streets of the city, which was taken on 9 August after the retreat of 11th Army. The Soviet forces of 34th, 27th and 11th Armies led a counter-offensive and closed to the outskirts of Staraya Russa on 12 August but could not hold on to their success because of total exhaustion.

In the autumn North-West front was on a pivotal point of the fighting activities in the Moscow and Leningrad directions, covering the vital Valdai Hills from which the northern flank of the advance of the Wehrmacht's Army Group Centre could be threatened. The Soviet troops took a deep defense between Lake Ilmen and Lake Seliger. They didn't let the German pass to the Valdai Hills and Bologoye railway station which connected Leningrad and Moscow.

Later in 1941 Volkhov Front was created to cover the sector north of Lake Ilmen to Lake Ladoga. The major task of North-West front now became to recapture the communications centre of Staraya Russa, in a fight that lasted for 880 days. There were two strategic and regular military operations which were unsuccessful and very costly in terms of losses.

=== 1942 ===
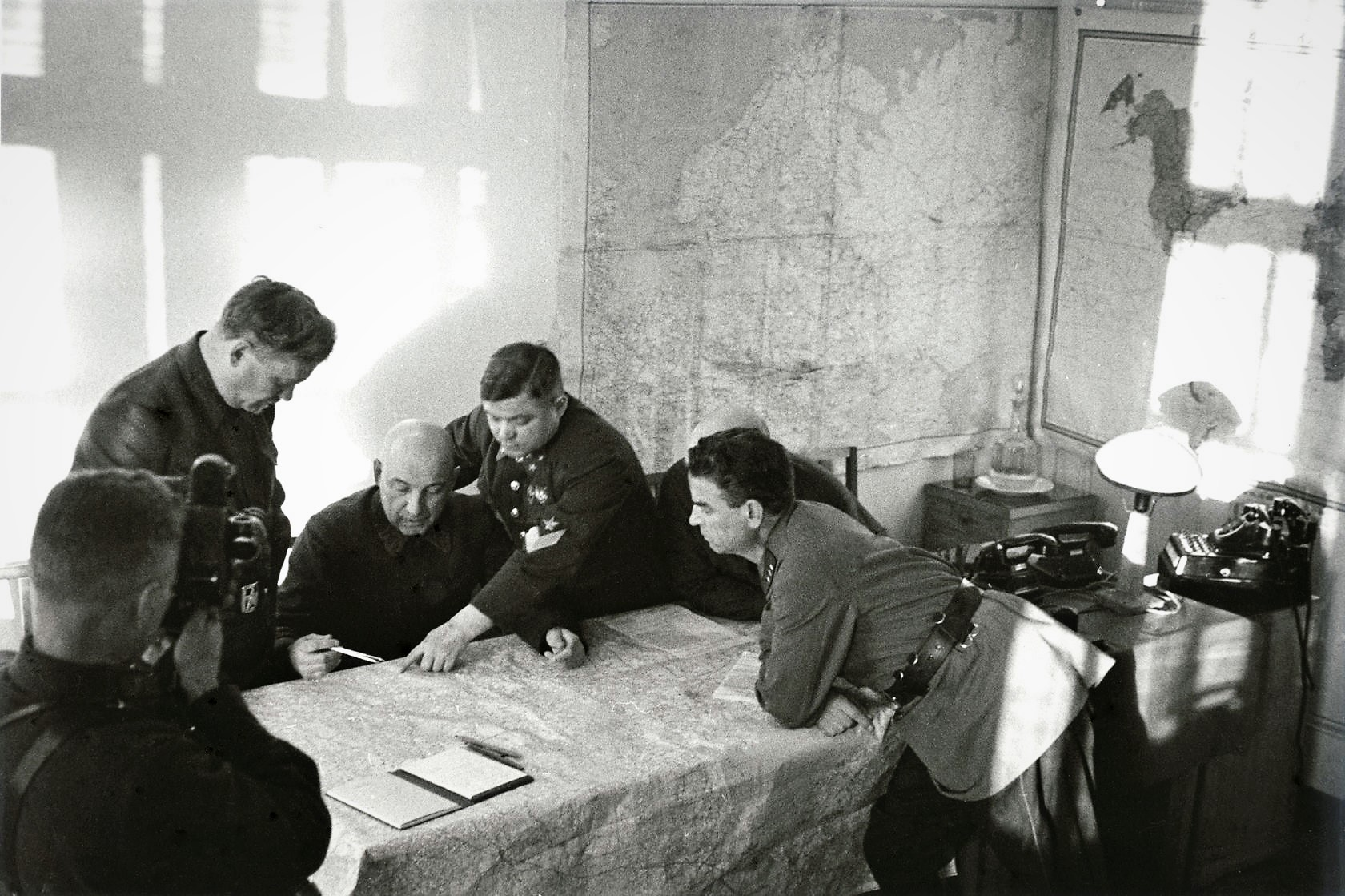
Officers of the Northwestern Front, February 1942

In 1942 the Front participated in the Demyansk Pocket (German: Festung Demjansk or Kessel von Demjansk; Russian: Демя́нский котёл), a name for the encirclement of German troops by the Red Army around Demyansk (Demjansk) begun as the first phase of the Demyansk Offensive Operation (7 January 1942 – 20 May 1942) by the Northwestern Front's commander's initiative, General Lieutenant Pavel Kurochkin. The intention was to sever the link between the German Demyansk positions, and the Stara Russa railway that formed the lines of communication of the German 16th Army. However owing to the very difficult wooded and swampy terrain, and heavy snow cover, the initial advance by the Front was very modest against stubborn opposition.

On 8 January 1942 a new Rzhev-Vyazma Strategic Offensive Operation begun that incorporated the previous Front planning into the Toropets-Kholm Offensive Operation (9 January 1942 – 6 February 1942) which formed the southern pincer of the operation that, beginning the second phase of the northern pincer Demyansk Offensive Operation (7 January 1942 – 20 May 1942) which encircled the German 16th Army's (Generaloberst Ernst Busch) II Army Corps, and parts of the X Army Corps (General der Artillerie Christian Hansen) during winter 1941/1942.

Trapped in the pocket were the 12th, 30th, 32nd, 123rd and 290th infantry divisions, as well as the SS-Division Totenkopf. There were also RAD, Police, Todt organization and other auxiliary units who were trapped and assisted in the battle. In total, about 90,000 German troops and around 10,000 auxiliaries were trapped inside the pocket. Their commander was General der Infanterie Walter Graf von Brockdorff-Ahlefeldt, commander of the IInd Army Corps.

=== Northwestern Front offensives ===
The Northwestern Front offensive was planned to encircle the entire northern flank of the 16th Army's forces, of which the IInd Army Corps was only a small part, and the Soviet command was desperate to keep the Front moving even after this success. The first thrust was made by the 11th Army, 1st Shock Army and the 1st and 2nd Guards Rifle Corps released for the operation from the Reserve of the Supreme High Command (Stavka Reserve). A second thrust was executed on 12 February by the 3rd and 4th Shock Armies of the Kalinin Front, with the additional plan of directly attacking the encircled German forces by inserting two airborne brigades to support the advance of the 34th Army (Soviet Union). The front soon settled as the Soviet offensive petered out due to difficult terrain and bad weather.

The Northwestern Front grew increasingly desperate to wipe out the pocket, and over the winter and spring launched a number of assaults on the "Ramushevo corridor" that formed the tenuous link between Demyans and Srara Russa through the Ramushevo village that were repeatedly repulsed. In total five Soviet Armies composed of 18 infantry divisions and three brigades were tied up for 4 months.

However, by the end of May the Stavka reconsidered the overall situation on the Front sector and decided to shift its attention to the Moscow sector where a new German offensive was expected in the summer.

=== 1943 ===
One of the more successful attempts to regain ground in the Staraya Russa region was the Toropets-Kholm Operation led by General Pavel Kurochkin. Only after the disaster at Stalingrad did it become possible for the Red Army to conduct Operation Polar Star from 12–26 February 1943, taking back 302 settlements in the region.

On 19 November 1943 Northwestern front was renamed 2nd Baltic Front.

Total casualties suffered by North-Western Front were more than 2,000,000 fallen and wounded.

== Commanders ==
- Colonel general Fyodor Kuznetsov (June–July 1941)
- Major General Pyotr Sobennikov (July–August 1941)
- Lieutenant general Pavel Kurochkin (August 1941 - October 1942)
- Marshal of the Soviet Union Semyon Timoshenko (October 1942 - March 1943)
- Colonel general Ivan Konev (March–June 1943)
- Lieutenant general Pavel Kurochkin (June–November 1943)

== References Sources ==
- David Glantz, Stumbling Colossus: The Red Army on the Eve of World War, University Press of Kansas, 1996, Appendix A: Red Army Order of Battle
- Португальский Ричард Михайлович, Доманк Альберт Степанович, Коваленко Александр Петрович Маршал С. К. Тимошенко Marshal S.K. Timoshenko, chapter on his command of the Northwestern Front (in Russian)
- A short information on North-Western front in Russian
