= 163rd Rifle Division =

163rd Rifle Division (August 1939 - June 4, 1940) 163rd Motorized Division (June 4, 1940 – September 15, 1941) 163rd Rifle Division (September 15, 1941 – March 1947)
- Active: 1939–1947
- Country: Soviet Union
- Branch: Red Army
- Type: Infantry, Motorized Infantry
- Size: Division
- Engagements: Winter War; Battle of Suomussalmi; Battle of Raate Road; Leningrad strategic defensive Soltsy-Dno Offensive; Demyansk Pocket; Demyansk Offensive (1943); Belgorod–Kharkov offensive operation Battle of the Dnieper; Battle of Kiev (1943); Zhitomir–Berdichev offensive Battle of Korsun–Cherkassy; Uman–Botoșani offensive First Jassy–Kishinev offensive Second Jassy–Kishinev offensive Battle of Debrecen; Budapest offensive Vienna offensive
- Decorations: Order of Lenin; Order of the Red Banner; Order of Suvorov; Order of Kutuzov
- Battle honours: Romny; Kiev

Commanders
- Notable commanders: Maj. Gen. Andrei Ivanovich Zelentsov; Maj. Gen. Ivan Mikhailovich Kuznetsov; Col. Grigorii Petrovich Kotov; Col. Mikhail Semyonovich Nazarov; Col. Kuzma Andreevich Vasilev; Maj. Gen. Fyodor Vasilevich Karlov

The 163rd Rifle Division was formed as an infantry division of the Red Army just before the Second World War began, in the Tula Oblast, based on the pre-September 13, 1939 shtat (table of organization and equipment). As a reinforced rifle division, it took part in the Winter War with Finland, where it was encircled at Suomussalmi. Despite a rescue attempt by the 44th Rifle Division from the Raate Road (which was also the route used by some of the 163rd's forces) the division was largely destroyed in one of the best-known Finnish victories of the war.

What little remained of the 163rd was moved postwar to Novgorod in the Leningrad Military District to be rebuilt as a motorized division. At the outbreak of war with Germany it was assigned to 1st Mechanized Corps and was part of the reserves of the redesignated Northern Front. In common with most Soviet motorized divisions it was significantly short of trucks and its outdated tanks were lost, mostly to breakdowns, before the end of August. During that month, as part of 34th Army, it took part in the Northwestern Front's counterstrike at Staraya Russa which briefly surrounded two German divisions and inflicted a considerable delay on Army Group North's advance on Leningrad, although at heavy cost.

On September 15, reality was acknowledged and the 163rd was again formed as a regular rifle division. Along with its Army it was forced back toward, and then past, the town of Demyansk, and it would be involved in the fighting around the German-held salient until early 1943. It was then removed to the Reserve of the Supreme High Command and moved south to join the 27th Army in Steppe Military District, soon renamed Steppe Front. By the time it entered the fighting after the German Kursk offensive it was in Voronezh Front and helped to create a major breach in the German lines in early August. As this was exploited the division was briefly transferred to 6th Guards Army and, before that Army was moved north, transferred again to 38th Army, still in Voronezh (soon 1st Ukrainian) Front. Under this command it gained a battle honor for taking the city of Romny. It then closed on the Dniepr south of Kyiv and prepared to force a crossing. After frustrating battles through October it played a leading role in taking the Ukrainian capital and was awarded its name as a second honorific. Following this, the 163rd was ordered to advance in the direction of Zhytomyr but was engaged by German counterattacks in the Fastiv area, being transferred to 40th Army as part of a general regrouping. In January 1944 it was diverted southward to take part in the encirclement battle near Cherkasy, and then advanced through western Ukraine toward the upper Dniestr River. In a period of less than 5 weeks the 163rd was awarded the Order of the Red Banner, the Order of Suvorov, and the Order of Lenin. Now part of 2nd Ukrainian Front it saw little service in the Front's spring campaign into Moldova, and was transferred back to 27th Army prior to the start of the August offensive toward Romania. It would remain in this Army for the duration of the war. The division took part in the defeat of the German 6th Army and earned its fourth decoration, the Order of Kutuzov, for its part in the capture of Ploiești at the end of the month. After Romania came over to the Allied forces the 27th Army entered Hungary, but did not directly participate in the fighting for Budapest. The 163rd moved, with its Army, over to 3rd Ukrainian Front in February 1945 and remained under that command into the postwar. It was one of the most highly decorated regular rifle formations when the war ended, and was moved back into Ukraine, where it was converted into a mechanized division in March 1947.

== Formation ==
The division began forming in August 1939, in the Tula Oblast, based on a rifle regiment of the 84th Rifle Division. Col. Andrei Ivanovich Zelentsov was appointed to command that month; he had been serving as commander of tank forces of 3rd Rifle Corps. He was promoted to the rank of Kombrig on November 4 and this would be modernized to major general on June 4, 1940, the day he left the division.

By September the 163rd was already being concentrated on the border with Latvia. In late October - early November it was moved to East Karelia, first as part of the Special Rifle Corps of 8th Army and then into the 47th Rifle Corps of 9th Army, which was under command of Komkor V. I. Chuikov. Over the next weeks it was heavily reinforced, until it comprised:

- 529th Rifle Regiment (from 54th Rifle Division)
- 662nd Rifle Regiment
- 759th Rifle Regiment
- 593rd Rifle Regiment (from 131st Rifle Division)
- 81st Mountain Rifle Regiment (from 54th Rifle Division)
- 365th Reconnaissance Regiment
- 365th Armored Car Battalion

These additional forces raised the personnel strength under Zelentsov to some 13,562 men.

== Battle of Suomussalmi ==
The provincial town of Suomussalmi, with a population of some 4,000 inhabitants, was a target for the Red Army largely due its position on the east side of the narrow "waist" of Finland, sitting astride the shortest route to Oulu, at the head of the Gulf of Bothnia. The roads on the Finnish side of the border were fairly well-developed in this region. When the 163rd crossed the border on November 30 it was burdened with such extraneous frills as a brass band, printing presses, plus truckloads of propaganda leaflets and of good-will gifts for the local populace. Although the possibilities were greatly exaggerated by Soviet intelligence, it was true that voters in the region tended to vote for left-wing parties and policies in national elections. If the town could be taken, good roads led to the rail junction at Hyrynsalmi, from where Oulu was only 240km distant.

Chuikov had deployed his Army in three columns. 54th Division (less the regiments attached to the 163rd) took the southern route, with the objective of reaching the town of Kuhmo. The center column was made up of the 163rd and the 44th Rifle Division moving on two roads toward Suomussalmi. In the north the 122nd Rifle Division advanced on Salla in an effort to link up with 14th Army's 88th Rifle Division. In common with all the Red Army thrusts into the central and northern wildernesses the Finns were taken aback that the Soviets were even bothering to attack there, and in such massive strength. The 163rd pushed off from its base at Ukhta, on the Murmansk Railroad, along one of the many forest roads that had been secretly built to access the border.

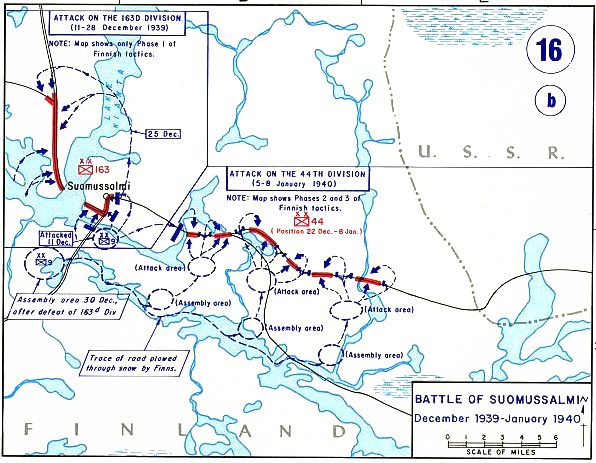
Battle of Suomussalmi. Note positions of the 163rd.

Two roads led to Suomussalmi. The northern Juntusranta Road ran southwest before joining a main north–south route that led through the town and then by separate routes to Hyrynsalmi and to Peranka. The southern Raate Road intersected the Hyrynsalmi–Peranka route in the middle of Suomussalmi. Of the two, the Raate Road was the most improved, and the Finns were expecting it to be used if a Soviet attack came. Zelentsov, however, sent two of his regiments along the Juntusranta Road, gaining complete tactical surprise and overwhelming a 50-man company of border guards. The two regiments pressed on and reached the Palovaara junction overnight on December 5/6. Meanwhile, another regiment was moving into Suomussalmi itself via the Raate Road after overcoming the resistance of two platoons of border guards and a pair of improvised roadblocks by the end of December 1. Thereafter, it faced several reserve companies from Kajaani which slowed, but did not stop its progress. By the morning of December 7 all civilians had been evacuated from the town, and most of its buildings were set afire, but it was a hasty job and some were missed while others were saved by Zelentsov's men after they entered. Altogether there were enough to shelter several hundred men. Of the two regiments on the Juntusranta Road, one turned north toward Peranka and the other reached Suomussalmi later that day to link up with the regiment from the Raate Road.

The Finnish command was responding to the situation by committing companies and battalions of reinforcements as they mobilized. The thrust on the Juntusranta Road appeared to be the more significant threat, and the independent infantry battalion ErP-16 began arriving at Peranka at 0100 hours, on December 6. By noon the whole battalion had taken up good defensive ground near Lake Piispajärvi, in time to meet the probing attacks of the lead elements of the 662nd Rifle Regiment, which had orders to reach Peranka by nightfall. This led to 24 hours of skirmishing, during which the initiative gradually passed to the Finns, despite being outnumbered about two-to-one. By now, all the Finnish forces operating north of the Palovaara road junction were grouped into "Task Force Susi" under command of Lt. Col. Paavo Susitaival, and the force was able to contain the 662nd, led by Colonel Sharov, with relative ease. In part this was due to one of Zelentsov's first of many costly mistakes; he had retained one of Sharov's battalions as his divisional reserve. Sharov made his situation worse on December 11 by sending a radio message to the rear, soon deciphered by Finnish intelligence, in which he complained that his men lacked boots, snowsuits, and adequate food. Further communications revealed that one of the divisional political officers had been "fragged" by some of his men, and a transmission on December 13 reported 160 battle casualties and 48 frostbite cases in the regiment to date, some 10 percent of its active strength, all while skirmishing.

Sharov tried to regain the initiative on December 14-15 and managed to make a temporary advance from Haapavaara to Ketola, but this was halted by mortar and Maxim machine gun fire. The lead battalion suffered 150 casualties, which brought his cumulative casualties to roughly 20 percent. With his soldiers reaching the end of their physical strength, Sharov ordered them over to the defensive. Meanwhile, Zelentsov had concentrated two regiments and most of his heavy weapons in Suomussalmi and the immediate area, and the Finns expected a new drive to commence on Hyrynsalmi. Marshal C. G. E. Mannerheim had already ordered the sole uncommitted regiment of the 9th Infantry Division, JR-27, under command of Col. Hjalmar Siilasvuo, to the area to deal with the threat. Under the operational plan, JR-27 was to form the core of an ad hoc task force of approximately brigade strength which was to destroy the 163rd. This was an ambitious objective as Zelentsov had attached tanks and organic artillery, as well as being numerically stronger in manpower. JR-27, on the other hand, had no heavy weapons at all, and lacked a full inventory of such basics as tents and snowsuits.

However, Siilasvuo's force had plenty of skis and men with experience in their use. Most were from small northern towns, many had worked as loggers, and they knew the forests well. Already there were over 30cm of snow on the ground. What the Finns lacked in firepower they could counter with mobility. Siilasvuo established his headquarters at Hyrynsalmi and concentrated his troops there, some 40km south of Suomussalmi. When elements of the 163rd advanced on that place on December 9 they were surprised to come under heavy machine gun fire just 1-2km from their jumping-off line.

=== Finnish Counterattack ===
By the end of December 10, Siilasvuo was beginning to formulate his counterattack plan. He had all three battalions of his JR-27 plus two composite battalions of covering troops who had been in action since November 30. In an effort to reassure these tired men he put a rumor about that his regiment was just the leading element of an entire division, and to back this up Mannerheim designated his command as the 9th Division on December 22. After examining the situation, Siilasvuo became convinced he could deal with Zelentsov, who had shown a lack of aggression and whose 662nd Regiment was almost entirely passive. The balance of the 163rd was by now strung out in a road column nearly 40km long from Piispajärvi back to east of Suomussalmi. In order to make sure he had the division "in the bag" Siilasvuo first moved to cut the Raate Road behind it to prevent any reinforcements from intervening. Overnight on December 10/11 he moved the bulk of JR-27 to an assembly area southeast of the town, some 8km south of the Raate Road. Meanwhile, his engineers built a network of ice roads to enhance the mobility of the few artillery pieces.

On the morning of December 12, Siilasvuo launched the first of many road-cutting operations that would be carried out over the coming weeks. By concentrating superior firepower on a selected sector of the road Red Army soldiers were overwhelmed despite desperate resistance, after which reinforcements would widen the gap as combat engineers began to fortify each end of the gap, some 400m wide. Siilasvuo had chosen a natural choke point close to the eastern tail of the 163rd's column, which was a 1,500m-wide isthmus between Lake Kuivasjärvi and Lake Kuomasjärvi. Any Soviet forces that arrived to rescue the 163rd would have to attack across the frozen lakes in the face of machine gun fire to outflank the roadblock; just 350 men were left to hold it against the eventual relief attempt by 44th Rifle Division.

The Finnish commander now launched an attack by a battalion against Soviet positions west of the village of Hulkoniemi. This had only limited success as the defenders were well entrenched and had artillery support, but Finnish harassing fire effectively isolated Suomussalmi from this direction. Siilasvuo now moved to tighten the noose around the 163rd with a series of sharp raids along the road north of Hulkoniemi and into the western outskirts of the town itself. In one skirmish a pair of T-28 tanks attacked a Finnish squad caught in a lightly wooded area. They were engaged by two junior officers, one armed with a grenade bundle and another with an automatic pistol to provide "covering fire". After he emptied three magazines against the armor the tank crews lost their nerve and retreated back to Suomussalmi before the grenades could be deployed.

Siilasvuo received his first artillery support on December 16 when four 76.2 mm pieces of 1890s vintage arrived. These were followed on the 18th by a more modern battery of the same calibre, and then on December 22 by a pair of badly needed 37 mm Bofors antitank guns. Within days he also received infantry regiment JR-64, a battalion of "ski guerillas" designated P-1, and an independent infantry battalion. His total strength now stood at some 11,500 men. Meanwhile, Task Force Susi, still containing the 662nd Regiment, was reinforced by bicycle battalion PPP-6 which was tasked with clearing a track a few kilometres northwest of Suomussalmi of a group of Soviet cavalry, probably of the 365th Reconnaissance Regiment. This was accomplished in a series of firefights during December 17-22. At the same time the Task Force itself sent about 2/3rds of its men, on skis, on a wide flanking march to Tervavaara. From there they made raids against the 163rds positions near the Palovaara road junction. On December 23 the newly formed regiment JR-65 arrived from Oulu to further reinforce the Task Force. Taking up positions on the north shore of Lake Piispajärvi it began rolling the 662nd back as far as Haapavaari by Christmas. This effectively pinned Sharov's men in place so they could do nothing the assist the main force near Suomussalmi. In fact the Regiment's resistance was rapidly fading as the Task Force found when it retook the Palovaara junction on December 27.

=== Rescue attempt ===
On December 13, Siilasvuo's single reconnaissance aircraft had reported that a fresh Soviet division was moving slowly westward along the Raate Road; again due to poor radio security this was soon identified as the 44th, under command of Kombrig A. I. Vinogradov. Finnish intelligence stated that Vinogradov intended to drive through and link up with the 163rd as early as December 22. It was rated as a better unit than the 163rd, with a much longer history and greater tank support. It included the battalion of the 662nd Regiment that had been held in reserve. All that was initially available to stop it was the 350 men at the roadblock. In order to prevent pressure against this position Siilasvuo ordered a series of sharp attacks against the head of the 44th, while also pushing forward the destruction of the 163rd. These attacks did little real damage, but led Vinogradov to believe he was being ambushed by superior forces. A following combination of sniper attacks, five-minute mortar bombardments, and ski raids by night caused his men to lose sleep and hot meals, and he soon entirely lost his nerve. His advance guard got close enough to actually hear the fighting around the 163rd, but the main force of the 44th failed to advance another metre.

=== Encirclement battle ===
From December 23 to 25, Zelentsov directed his men in several attempts to break out. The Finns lost ground in several places due to Soviet firepower and armor, but always retook their original positions within 24 hours, usually at night, which was almost continual at this latitude at this time of the year. In the process the 163rd used up much of its remaining ammunition. By December 26 Siilasvuo was convinced there would be no breakout. His all-out attack began the next day, directed primarily at the western side of the Suomussalmi perimeter. Two battalions struck Hulkoniemi, and another two against the main road about 1,500m to the north. These were supported by all eight Finnish 76.2mm guns, and each force had one anti-tank gun. Twelve km farther north the PPP-6 battalion made a two-pronged attack on the Kylänmaki road junction. There were several diversionary attacks as well. All of them stepped off more or less on time at 0800 hours. The push at Hulkoniemi faced strong resistance, and Detachment Paavola got mixed up on open ice against several small Soviet groups with tank support. However, PPP-6 successfully rolled up most of the defenses it faced and destroyed six vehicles. The results on December 28 improved, with PPP-6 taking the Kylänmaki junction and holding it against a vigorous counterattack. The attack at Hulkoniemi initially fared about the same until at about 0900 resistance suddenly collapsed. Some defenders crossed the narrows to enter Suomussalmi while others abandoned their weapons and fled across the ice of Lake Kiantajärvi in the general direction of the Soviet frontier. Dressed in khaki overcoats they were conspicuous against the snow and were easily targeted by Finnish machine guns from both sides.

The resistance in the town itself was tough, with many machine gun posts established in fortified cellars. These had to be taken one after the next with grenades and sub-machine guns, but the position was utterly untenable, and soon the survivors were also streaming across the ice, as vulnerable as those who had come before, or more so as Siilasvuo and his staff had anticipated the directions they would follow and had strung barbed wire entanglements while also bringing the artillery to bear. By December 28 resistance in and around Suomussalmi had ended, with only one regimental-sized pocket holding out on the road north of Hulkoniemi. The defenders made dozens of desperate attempts to break out as late as 1000 hours on December 29. The last effort left some 300 Red Army men dead with negligible casualties to the Finns. Given the dense terrain it was inevitable that some fairly large bodies of troops would be able to escape undetected. Siilasvuo again anticipated some of these efforts and attempted to intercept with motorized machine gun crews and even a rare air strike by a pair of Bristol Blenheim bombers. When the firing ended on December 30 the 163rd had ceased to exist as an organized division. All its artillery, other heavy weapons, and attached tanks had been lost. In the immediate vicinity of Suomussalmi the Finns counted more than 5,000 dead, and it was impossible to calculate how many more had perished in the forests leading back to the border. In spite of everything, the Finns only took 500 prisoners from the division, in addition to capturing 11 tanks.

Despite the overall disaster, four men of the attached 81st Mountain Rifle Regiment were made Heroes of the Soviet Union on January 26, 1940. Among them was Lt. Pyotr Tikhonovich Mikhailitsyn, commander of the reconnaissance company. On November 30 he had led his men, who were experienced skiers, 20km behind Finnish lines to capture the village of Yuntusranta and hold there until the remainder of the regiment came up. On December 9 the company became surrounded while on a scouting mission. Despite being wounded he organized a successful breakout. Mikhailitsyn would go on to serve as deputy commander of the 112th Rifle Division at the Battle of Stalingrad. After furthering his military education he was given command of the 5th Rifle Division and was promoted to major general on September 13, 1944. He would reach the rank of lieutenant general before his retirement in 1956, and lived in Volgograd until his death on February 11, 1961.

Zelentsov and his staff were among those who escaped, so the division was not disbanded, evading the fate of the 18th Rifle Division to the south. He would leave the 163rd to take command of the 88th Rifle Division. He was more fortunate than Vinogradov, who was executed in front of his remaining men, along with his chief of staff, on January 11. Colonel Sharov of the 662nd Regiment would share this fate. Zelentsov became the acting commander of the Arkhangelsk Military District shortly after the German invasion in 1941, but was killed in action on August 15. Ivan Mikhailovich Kuznetsov took over command of the division on June 4 and had his rank modernized to major general on the same day. He had previously served as deputy commander of the 84th Rifle Division and more recently as commander of the 62nd Rifle Division.

== 163rd Motorized Division ==
What remained of the core 163rd, amounting to some 753 personnel, was withdrawn after the war to Novgorod. As the remnants of the division required a substantial rebuild it was selected to be converted into a motorized division. Already by mid-April its strength had been brought up to some 6,000. Orders to this effect became effective on July 1, and it was assigned to be the motorized division of 1st Mechanized Corps. General Kuznetsov continued in command, where he would remain for the duration of the division's existence as a motorized unit. Its order of battle, as of the beginning of the German invasion, was as follows:

- 529th Motorized Rifle Regiment
- 759th Motorized Rifle Regiment
- 25th Tank Regiment (until August 25, 1941)
- 365th Artillery Regiment
- 204th Antitank Battalion
- 320th Antiaircraft Battalion
- 177th Reconnaissance Battalion
- 230th Light Engineer Battalion
- 248th Signal Battalion
- 172nd Artillery Park Battalion
- 298th Medical/Sanitation Battalion
- 148th Auto Transport Battalion
- 122nd Repair and Recovery Battalion
- 20th Regulation Company
- 334th Motorized Field Bakery (later 274th)
- 91st Divisional Artillery Workshop
- 457th Field Postal Station
- 198th Field Office of the State Bank

Before this time it had been assigned to 1st Mechanized Corps, along with the 3rd Tank Division and 5th Motorcycle Regiment, in the Leningrad Military District, which was soon redesignated as Northern Front. The division itself was stationed at Ostrov, in summer camps at Cherekha. 25th Tank Regiment had four battalions, for an official complement of 252 tanks and 12 armored cars, and it was very close to this figure, but these were all older models (25 BT-5s, 229 T-26s, 13 T-37/38s) but some 23 of these were non-operational. Kuznetsov had his forces on the march by 2000 hours, en route for the Gatchina area. The District commander, Lt. Gen. M. M. Popov, had prepared a defense plan on May 25 which proposed the formation of five "covering regions", each manned by the forces of its own Army. Under this plan, as originally formulated, the 163rd and 3rd Tank, plus the 191st, 177th, and 70th Rifle Divisions were retained as Popov's reserve, although some of these additional forces had been reassigned by the outbreak of the war.

By the beginning of July the Corps had left the reserve and had been moved to 11th Army in Northwestern Front. After its breakneck advance through the Baltic states, Army Group North began moving again early on July 9 from the Pskov and Ostrov regions. It was now 250km from Leningrad.

=== Counterstroke at Staraya Russa ===
By mid-July the Army Group's drive had stalled, due to logistics, difficult terrain and Red Army resistance, including a counterattack near Soltsy which temporarily encircled the 8th Panzer Division. On July 30 Hitler issued a directive for the renewal of the offensive with a main attack between Narva and Lake Ilmen. This was followed on August 6 with a communique from OKW that stated Soviet forces had been almost completely cleared from the Baltic states and that the start line had been occupied for the thrust on Leningrad. Meanwhile, the STAVKA was preparing for the renewed offensive and issued orders on August 9 and 10 to Marshal K. E. Voroshilov of the Northwestern Direction and Maj. Gen. P. P. Sobennikov of Northwestern Front to use the reinforcements provided to them in late July and early August for a counterstroke aimed at destroying German forces in the Soltsy, Staraya Russa and Dno regions. The operation would be largely planned and directed by Lt. Gen. N. F. Vatutin, Sobennikov's chief of staff. By this time the 163rd had lost nearly all its tanks to direct and indirect fire and air attack, but primarily to mechanical breakdown, and the 25th Regiment would be officially disbanded on August 25, but it was already a mechanized division in name only, as it had never had a full complement of trucks.

Vatutin's plan involved concentric attacks by the 11th, 27th, 34th and 48th Armies and was clearly overly ambitious. It was to begin on August 12 aimed at 16th Army's X Army Corps which was defending at Staraya Russa and, after cutting it off and destroying it, to then liberate Soltsy, Dno and Kholm, disrupting the German offensive. In the event it was preempted when the German forces went over to their own attacks on August 10, but still achieved success on some sectors. Most notably the 202nd and 163rd Motorized, which were now in 34th Army, joined the 25th Cavalry Division in a lunge that pushed 40km westward through the German defensive cordon and reached the Staraya Russa–Dno rail line early on August 14. This determined assault enveloped X Corps in Staraya Russa, separated it from II Army Corps on its right flank and threatened the rear of the main German panzer force advancing on Novgorod. The situation was restored by August 22 through the intervention of the LVI Motorized Corps and three days later the 34th and 11th Armies had been driven back to the line of the Lovat River. Although suffering heavy losses (from August 10–28 34th Army suffered 60 percent casualties in personnel, 89 percent losses in tanks and 58 percent in other vehicles) the Soltsy-Dno operation delayed Army Group North's drive on Leningrad for another 10 days which may have been decisive in keeping the city in Soviet hands. On September 15 reality was acknowledged and the 163rd was reorganized as a regular rifle division.

== Reformation ==
Once reformed, the division's order of battle became as follows:

- 529th Rifle Regiment (from 529th Motorized Rifle Regiment)
- 759th Rifle Regiment (from 759th Motorized Rifle Regiment)
- 1318th Rifle Regiment (formed from reservists)
- 365th Artillery Regiment
- 204th Antitank Battalion
- 462nd Mortar Battalion (from November 4, 1941 to October 23, 1942)
- 177th Reconnaissance Company
- 203rd Sapper Battalion (until July 15, 1943), 230th Sapper Battalion (after July 15, 1943)
- 248th Signal Battalion (later 248th Signal Company)
- 298th Medical/Sanitation Battalion
- 97th Chemical Defense (Anti-gas) Platoon
- 267th Auto Transport Company
- 334th Field Bakery
- 250th Divisional Veterinary Hospital
- 837th Field Postal Station
- 509th Field Office of the State Bank

General Kuznetsov remained in command only until September 18. He would later briefly lead the 254th and 360th Rifle Divisions, and then for a longer term in 332nd Rifle Division, before he moved into the physical and combat training establishment. He was replaced for ten days by Col. Pyotr Efimovich Popov, and then by Col. Grigorii Petrovich Kotov, who had been chief of staff of 8th Army during the Winter War.

=== Battles for Demyansk ===
Following the Staraya Russa fighting the commander of Army Group North, Field Marshal W. J. F. von Leeb, resolved to ensure that his right flank was secure before beginning the final push on Leningrad. Constant Soviet attacks from the Valdai Hills region enticed 16th Army to keep pushing farther eastward. Given the losses the 34th Army had suffered and the priority for Soviet reinforcements on the Moscow and Leningrad axes there was little it could do to stop this advance, although the 11th and 27th Armies held firm on the flanks. Demyansk was taken in early September, but by now LVI Motorized Corps was in an absurd position at the end of a single 90km-long dirt road through swamps back to the railhead at Staraya Russa. LVI Motorized was soon withdrawn in preparation for the renewed offensive on Moscow, and was replaced by II Corps. As winter began to arrive in October the 16th Army's offensive came to a halt and a period of stalemate settled over the area.

34th Army was under command of Maj. Gen. N. E. Berzarin. As the Red Army's winter counteroffensive widened from the Moscow area he was ordered to form two division-sized shock groups to support the efforts of 11th and 3rd Shock Armies but otherwise to fix as much of German 16th Army in place as possible with diversionary attacks. The 163rd was located directly northeast of Demyansk itself, facing most of 3rd SS Division Totenkopf. After months of sporadic activity the division, along with the rest of Berzarin's army, finally ran down in the third week of March, 1942. Colonel Kotov had left the division on February 16, and was replaced by Col. Mikhail Semyonovich Nazarov. Kotov would later command the 47th Army and the 6th Guards Rifle Corps, rising to the rank of lieutenant general, but was killed in action while leading the latter in November 1944. Nazarov had commanded the 182nd Rifle Division in 1941 before being removed from his post. His tenure was also relatively brief, as he was hospitalized with a severe leg fracture on May 8, and was replaced the next day by Col. Kuzma Andreevich Vasilev, who had been in command of the 759th Regiment.

The German attempt to relieve the pocket, Operation Brückenschlag, had been achieved by April 21. The so-called "Ramushevo corridor" was less than 4km wide and often under Soviet artillery fire so II Corps was still heavily dependent on air supply. From May to October Northwestern Front made several attempts to sever the corridor, but these did not directly involve the 163rd. German engineers had turned the area into a fortified zone, complete with deep barbed wire obstacles and extensive minefields. 11th Army was on the north side of the corridor while 1st Shock Army held the south side; 34th and 53rd Armies covered the remainder of the salient.

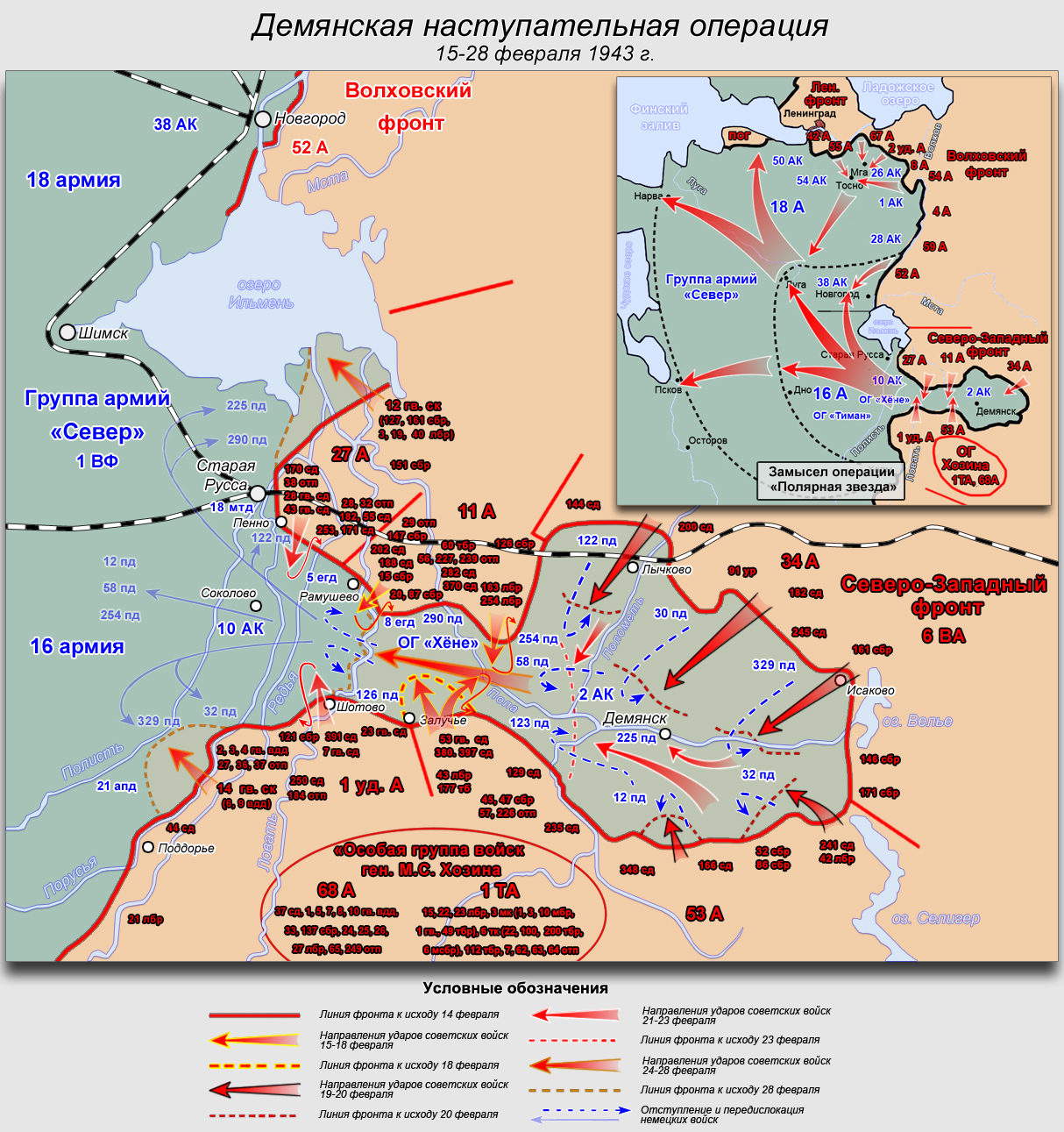
Demyansk Pocket, February 1943, Note position of the 163rd (mislabeled as a ski brigade) in the east part of the 11th Army sector.

In January 1943 the division was transferred to 11th Army, still in Northwestern Front, in anticipation of yet another attempt to cut the corridor. Unbeknownst to the Soviet command, on January 31 the German High Command ordered that the Demyansk salient be evacuated, in the wake of the encirclement and upcoming destruction of 6th Army at Stalingrad. The division had been earmarked for Northwestern Front's part in Operation Polyarnaya Zvezda, which began on February 15, but made only marginal gains against the 254th Infantry Division. Operation Ziethen began on February 17; all of Northwestern Front's armies attempted to harass the withdrawing forces, primarily with ski troops, but the German withdrawal freed up the reserves they needed to reinforce their lines along the Lovat, and the "pursuit" through the devastated landscape achieved little. On March 17 Colonel Vasilev was dismissed from his post; he would later further his military education before moving to the staff of 2nd Baltic Front. He was replaced by Col. Fyodor Vasilevich Karlov, who had previously led the 170th Rifle Division. He would be made a Hero of the Soviet Union on May 17, 1944, promoted to the rank of major general on September 13, and remained in command of the division for the duration of the war.

==== Move to the South ====
Under STAVKA Order No. 46088 issued at 0210 hours on March 29 the 163rd was transferred to the Reserve of the Supreme High Command along with three other rifle divisions of Northwestern Front. At the end of May it was assigned to 27th Army in the Steppe Military District in the rear of the Fronts holding the salient around Kursk.

== Into Ukraine ==
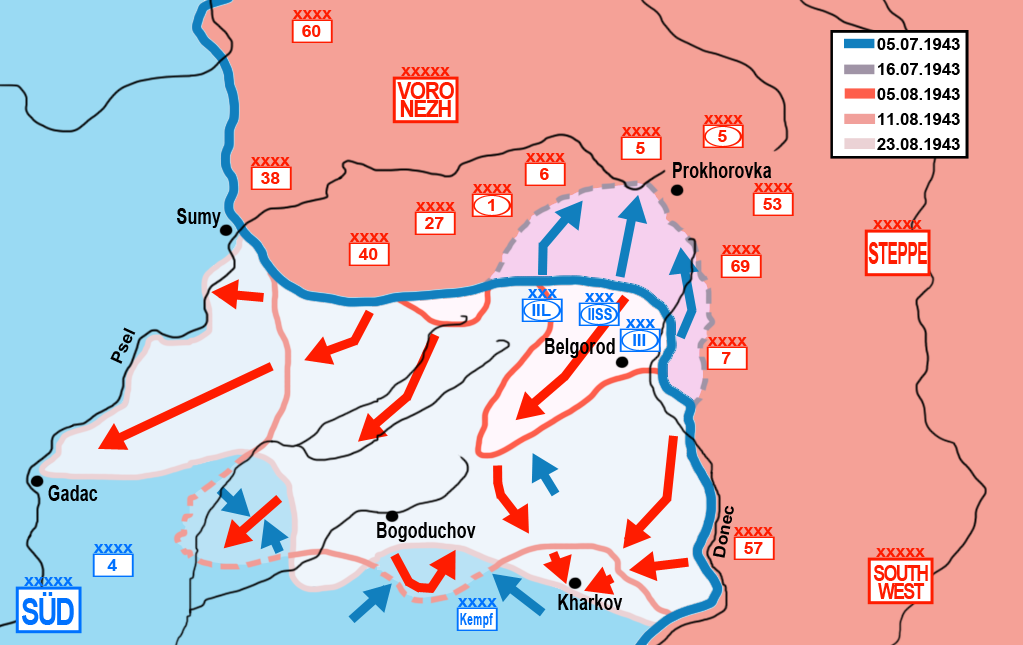
Operation Polkovodets Rumyantsev. Note initial position of 27th Army.

The Battle of Kursk began on July 5, and four days later the Steppe Military District was redesignated as Steppe Front. 27th Army was deployed along a line from Rossoshnoye to Nikolskoye and consisted of six rifle divisions (71st, 147th, 155th, 163rd, 166th and 241st) plus the 93rd Tank Brigade.

27th Army saw no significant action during the German offensive, and by the beginning of August it had been transferred to Voronezh Front, which was still holding the southern half of the salient. In preparation for the counteroffensive, which began on August 3, the Army, which had been reinforced with additional armor and artillery assets, was concentrated behind the 40th Army's center in the Marino–Krasnaya Yaruga–Borisopole area. On the night of the operation's third day the Army was to deploy along the 11km-wide front from Kresanov to Soldatskoye while its main forces concentrated in the center to break through the German defense along the 6km sector Kasilovo–Novo-Berezovka. The Army was organized in two echelons, with four rifle divisions, a tank brigade, a Guards heavy tank regiment, and other reinforcements in the first echelon. The shock group consisted of the 241st and 163rd Divisions in first echelon, two second echelon divisions (155th and 71st), two tank corps, and the greater part of the reinforcements.

=== Operation Polkovodets Rumyantsev ===
The Front commander, Army Gen. N. F. Vatutin, ordered 27th Army on August 4 to organize a powerful reconnaissance-in-force along its entire front and prepare for attacking with its main forces. Along a number of sectors this reconnaissance penetrated up to 2-3km into the German defense. Later that day Marshal G. K. Zhukov issued instructions for the STAVKA that included:

1. For the purpose of widening the breach toward the west, on the morning of 5 August the 27th and 40th armies are to begin their offensive in the general direction of Graivoron.

On the morning of August 5 the shock groups of the two Armies attacked; due to the success of 27th Army's reconnaissance in disrupting the German defense system it limited itself to a powerful artillery onslaught of only 15 minutes. Having crushed the resistance of the 57th Infantry Division both Armies broke through the German front along a 26km-wide sector and by the close of the day had advanced in fighting 8-20km and reached the line Starosele–Kasilovo–Ivanovskaya Lisitsa–Nikitskoe. During the day the 11th Panzer Division had made repeated counterattacks with no success and at considerable cost in casualties.

The orders for August 6 directed 27th Army, along with the 4th Guards Tank Corps, to attack southwest towards Okhtyrka and reach the front Opposhnya–Bolshaya Rublevka–Kachalovka; it was subsequently planned to attack along both banks of the Vorskla River in the general direction of Poltava, while part of the Army's forces would assist the 6th Guards Army in destroying the German Tomarovka–Borisovka group of forces. This included the 163rd, which was transferred to that Army's 22nd Guards Rifle Corps. 6th Guards was now along the line Zybino–Moshchenoye–Tomarovka. By the end of the day part of the Army's forces had occupied Borisovka and reached its northeastern outskirts. By the following day the German grouping was encircled and making desperate efforts to break out, but none of these were successful and the grouping was eliminated.

During August 8-11 the Front's forces continued to advance to the west and southwest, both to widen the breakthrough and to cut the communications from Kharkiv to the west. On the first day the 1st Tank Army became involved in heavy fighting with the reinforcing 3rd Totenkopf and 2nd SS Panzer Division Das Reich, plus remnants of the 19th Panzer Division. 6th Guards Army had been pulled back to Front reserve after the encirclement battle was finished and was concentrating near Zolochiv. On the morning of August 10 Vatutin was informed by Zhukov that the STAVKA's top priority was to isolate Kharkiv in a joint effort by 1st and 5th Guards Tank Armies. The attempted advance by 1st Tanks ran into further German reserves, including 5th SS Panzer Division Wiking, and by the end of August 11 it had been halted and even forced back on several sectors. In response the 163rd was operationally subordinated to 1st Tanks and, in cooperation with two brigades of 6th Tank Corps, went over to the attack on the morning of August 12 and by 1300 hours had destroyed a German force in the 11th Sotnya–Sharovka area, before coming under continuous counterattacks by Totenkopf. After losing some ground the combined Soviet force brought the German counteroffensive to a halt by the morning of August 14.

== Battles for Kyiv ==
In the third week of September the 6th Guards Army was withdrawn to the Reserve of the Supreme High Command and began to redeploy to the north-central sector of the front. Prior to this the 163rd was reassigned to 50th Rifle Corps in 38th Army, still in Voronezh Front. While advancing with this force the division was awarded its first battle honor for the liberation of Romny on September 16.

38th Army was attacking along the Kyiv axis, preparing to force the Dniepr immediately south of the city. However, when its forces were already only two to three marches from the river Vatutin ordered the Army commander, Maj. Gen. N. E. Chibisov, to regroup to his right wing so as to instead make its crossing north of Kyiv. The Army was tasked with creating a bridgehead, reaching as far as the Irpin River, while also destroying the German east bank bridgehead at Darnitsa. The four divisions of 51st Corps were to make the crossing while 50th Corps operated against Darnitsa to clear the left bank. As of September 20 the 163rd was recorded as being one of the weaker of 38th Army's rifle divisions with 5,045 personnel, armed with 25 82mm and 15 120mm mortars, five 76mm regimental and 16 76mm divisional guns, and eight 122mm howitzers.

On September 23 the three divisions of 50th Corps (71st, 136th, 163rd) were committed into this battle, along with the 56th Guards Tank Brigade of 3rd Guards Tank Army. While the German forces were thrown out of Gogolev and Borispol, any further advance was halted by stiff resistance and counterattacks. This fighting continued into September 28 in the area of Brovary and Darnitsa and the Corps was unable to break through to the crossing points to disrupt the German evacuation over the Dniepr. Finally this was completed and all crossing means were destroyed as 50th Corps finally reached the riverbank. 38th Army had left most of its crossing equipment well to the rear, so was forced to rely on improvised means.

On September 30 the commander of 50th Corps was directed to concentrate his 136th and 163rd Divisions in the area of Bortnychi and Vishenki before forcing the Dniepr with their forward detachments overnight on September 30/October 1 on the Pirogovo axis. At this time Chibisov's plan was to take Kyiv from north and south, with 50th Corps forming the southern prong. On October 2-3 elements of the 136th, followed by units of the 163rd, made crossings but were unable to advance further. The Corps had received little in reinforcements and was short of all types of ammunition after the long advance, as well as the abovementioned crossing equipment. 51st Corps had marginally greater success north of the city, in the vicinity of the village of Lyutizh. Despite the crossing having made limited gains, a total of 35 men of the division would be made Heroes of the Soviet Union on October 29. Among them was Krasnoarmeets Ivan Pavlovich Belopolskii, a rifleman of the 529th Regiment. On October 1 he was the first of his landing group to reach the western shore using improvised means. Having managed to take the Germans in the first line of trenches by surprise he entered the trench with his group and got into hand-to-hand combat, in which he succeeded. Following this he helped to repel several counterattacks with machine gun fire, inflicting some dozens of casualties, knocked out a small German armored vehicle, and took a German officer as a prisoner. During the fighting in Romania in later 1944 he was seriously wounded with a bullet through his neck which damaged his jaw, and he never returned to the front, although he lived until February 4, 1984, after working as chairman of a collective farm in his native village near Kirov.

=== Liberation of Kyiv ===
On October 5 the 13th and 60th Armies to the north of the 38th were transferred to Voronezh Front (as of October 20 1st Ukrainian Front) to reinforce the push for Kyiv. 51st Corps continued its efforts to expand the Lyutizh bridgehead until October 10, but with scant results. On October 27 Chibisov handed the Army over to Col. Gen. K. S. Moskalenko.

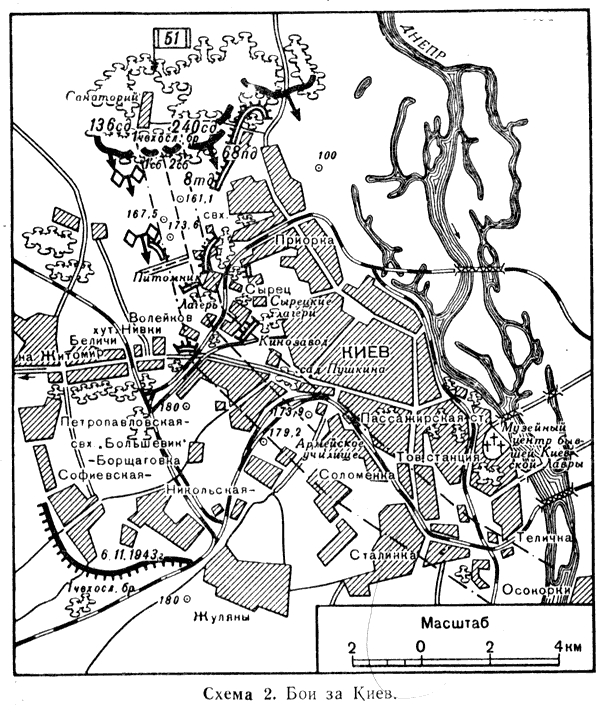
Soviet map of Kiev (1943)

A significant regrouping took place at about the same time as the STAVKA gave up on efforts to break out of the bridgehead at Bukryn, south of Kyiv; among other measures the 3rd Guards Tanks was to move north to join the 38th and 60th Armies in breaking out of the Lyutizh bridgehead. This flank of the offensive was to begin on November 3. The German defenses in front of 38th Army were generally simple but extended to a depth of up to 14km. In order to break through these defenses Moskalenko concentrated his 50th and 51st Corps, backed by 5th Guards Tank Corps, along the 14km-wide sector from Moshchun to Vyshhorod with a shock group of two divisions of each Corps in the center on a 6km front; the 163rd was in second echelon. The 23rd Rifle Corps was in Army second echelon behind 50th Corps. The shock group was further supported by an average of 383.3 guns and mortars (76mm+ calibre) per kilometre.

After the reading aloud of an order by Vatutin and Lt. Gen. N. S. Khrushchev to the troops, urging the storming of Kyiv, the artillery opened at 0800 hours for a 40-minute preparation. The infantry and armor advance began at 0840 and despite heavy fire resistance and counterattacks the shock group managed to gain 5-12km during the day. 50th Corps reached Dachi Pushcha-Voditsa after covering 7km. Much of the terrain was heavily wooded, which complicated the offensive, as did the presence of the 7th and 8th Panzer and 20th Motorized Divisions in immediate reserve. For November 4, Moskalenko directed 50th Corps to reach the line Mostyshche–Shevchenko–Bobritsa–Malyutyanka–Yankovichi while 51st Corps began entering the city itself. Through the day 38th Army gained an additional 5km in the face of significant armored counterattacks. On the next morning it became clear that a major withdrawal of German forces was underway and 50th Corps began clearing the western outskirts, apart from the 167th which was fighting in the city center. By 0400 hours on November 6 Kyiv had been cleared, and the 163rd received its second honorific:

KIEV... 163rd Rifle Division (Colonel Karlov, Fyodor Vasilevich)... The troops who participated in the liberation of Kiev, by the order of the Supreme High Command of 6 November 1943, and a commendation in Moscow, are given a salute of 24 artillery salvoes from 324 guns.

Through the rest of the day 38th Army continued to develop the offensive to the south and advanced 20km; 50th Corps with 5th Guards Tanks reached from Hlevakha to Khodosovka and at day's end was out of contact with German forces. The following day the 5th Guards was removed from its support role to help form a mobile group to exploit toward Zhytomyr. This objective was to be reached by the end of November 9.

==== Fighting near Fastiv ====
On November 7 the Army was directed to advance toward Bila Tserkva and it covered 6-12km, with 50th Corps reaching the Vasylkiv area, but this was considerably short of its assigned goals. The following day the Corps made greater progress, covering 14-24km, again in cooperation with 5th Guards Tanks. However, the 4th Panzer Army was now gathering reserves, including the new 25th Panzer and the 2nd SS Panzer Divisions, and these began counterattacking the 3rd Guards Tank Army. The situation was complicated by the inability of 50th Corps to reach Fastiv to relieve the tank army for more decisive operations. At dawn on November 9 Vatutin ordered Moskalenko to take Zhytomyr by the end of the 12th. During the day the 232nd and 340th Divisions of 50th Corps, along with elements of 3rd Guards Tanks, fought off counterattacks in the Fastivets area. Despite losing 13 tanks destroyed the German forces captured that village by the end of the day; by now the four divisions of the Corps were spread across a frontage of 60km. On November 10 the 163rd took the villages of Kornyn and Mokhnachka west of Fastiv, and the 11th captured Zhovtnevo as well, but over the following days it became involved in heavy defensive battles, being forced to leave Mokhnachka on November 12 and make a short retreat to the north. On the same date the Army's right wing forces took Zhytomyr, and overnight the 50th Corps was subordinated to 3rd Guards Tank Army. 1st Ukrainian Front was now forced over to the defense.

Frustrated at Fastiv, the German command moved its armored forces to the Zhytomyr–Kornyn axis by November 15. The fighting in this area continued for the remainder of the month, with the Zhytomyr being retaken and the advance continuing to within 60km of Kyiv. On November 15 the 232nd was reported as having 4,382 personnel, with 67 guns and mortars of 76mm+ calibre. The previous day it had been transferred, with the rest of 50th Corps, to 40th Army, which had moved up from the Bukryn bridgehead. In December the division was transferred to 51st Corps.

=== Korsun Pocket ===
By mid-January 1944 the 1st Ukrainian Front's sector extended to nearly 400km in length at it was obvious it could not continue its advance without closing from the east. At the same time, part of the German 8th Army was, at Hitler's insistence, continuing to hold a sector along the Dniepr centered on Korsun-Shevchenkivskyi. Marshal Zhukov and his two Front commanders, Vatutin and Army Gen. I. S. Konev of 2nd Ukrainian Front, saw the first opportunity for a set-piece double envelopment battle since Stalingrad. On January 24 the latter launched a reconnaissance-in-force which struck a 20km stretch of 8th Army's front where it had no more than one infantryman for every 15m of the line. By day's end deep penetrations had been made in several areas, and the following day the 4th Guards Army launched a general attack with 12 rifle divisions entering the gap.

On January 26 two armored corps of 6th Tank Army began a headlong drive to complete the encirclement from the north. During the afternoon of the 28th the linkup was made at Shpola, trapping the 56,000 troops of the XI and XXXXII Army Corps. Even now, Hitler forbade this force to move. In the wake of 6th Tanks the 40th and 27th Armies came up to reinforce the armor and prevent any break-in or breakout. The first began on February 4, led by III Panzer Corps, but by two days later it was becoming apparent that a break-out would also be necessary; this finally began on the night of February 11/12 and initially took the Soviet forces by surprise. The struggle went on until late on February 16 and in the end some 30,000 were able to escape, without any heavy weapons, and many of the men would be combat-ineffective for months. During the month 40th Army was reassigned to 2nd Ukrainian Front, and the 163rd was moved to 104th Rifle Corps.

== Jassy–Kishinev Offensives ==
Uman–Botoșani Offensive. Note initial position of 40th Army, and capture of Khotyn (Хотин) on April 3.

The Uman–Botoșani operation began on March 5 and the 163rd advanced from north of Uman, crossing the Southern Bug River near Ladyzhyn on March 13. Three days later it took part in the retaking of Vapniarka and for this the division was awarded the Order of the Red Banner on March 19. Pushing on, it helped to destroy a German grouping near Tulchyn and then reached the Dniestr River and the border of Romania near Mohyliv-Podilskyi on the same day as its award. By the beginning of April it had returned to 50th Corps, still in 40th Army. The Corps was in the center of the Army's sector, and on April 5 the bulk of the Army had successfully crossed the upper reaches of both the Dniestr and the Prut, while also capturing Bălți. For these successes the 163rd received the Order of Suvorov, 2nd Degree, on April 8. Yet another decoration, the Order of Lenin, would be received on April 18 for the capture of Khotyn. In addition, for his effective leadership since the crossing of the Dniepr, Colonel Karlov would be made a Hero of the Soviet Union on May 17.

=== First Jassy-Kishinev Offensive ===
On April 8 Konev had designated the 40th and 27th Armies as his Front's shock group and ordered the two Armies to begin a coordinated advance southward along the Târgu Frumos axis in close cooperation with the lead elements of 2nd Tank Army; this did not immediately involve 50th Corps. At dawn on April 13 the 51st Corps began an attack against the Romanian VI Army Corps from Târgu Neamț to the Seret River. This drive made initial gains and was soon reinforced by the 4th Guards Airborne Division of 50th Corps on April 15, followed by other forces of the Corps plus the 5th Guards Cavalry Corps. The commander of 40th Army, Lt. Gen. F. F. Zhmachenko, suspended the attacks on April 16, probably due to the failures of 27th Army to the east, before 3rd SS Totenkopf Panzer Division entered the fighting.

Konev ordered a regrouping on April 23 for a new drive on Târgu Frumos. This would be led by 51st Corps on the 40th Army's sector. In large part due to the arrival of the German V Army Corps this attack, beginning on April 24, actually caused 51st Corps to lose ground until the situation stabilized on April 28. Konev immediately began planning a new push, ordering General Zhmachenko to organize and conduct two secondary supporting attacks in the area north of Târgu Neamț and Pașcani to tie down German and Romanian reserves. The offensive finally began at dawn on May 2 but only the 104th Corps achieved any success, advancing up to 7km against the Romanian defenders. On May 7 the Front was ordered to go over to the defense.

=== Second Jassy-Kishinev Offensive ===
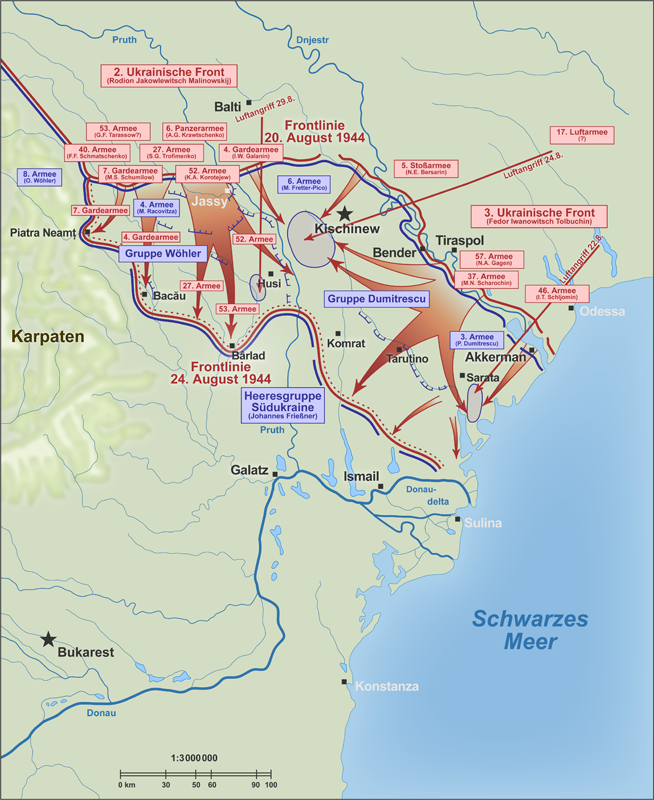
Second Jassy-Kishinev Offensive. Note location of 27th Army.

In June the 163rd left 50th Corps and came under direct command of 40th Army, but in preparation for the summer offensive it was assigned to 27th Army, where it rejoined 104th Corps. The division would remain in this Army for the duration of the war. In the plan for the offensive the 27th and 52nd Armies were to provide the shock group for 2nd Ukrainian Front and the 104th and 35th Guards Corps were in 27th Army's first echelon. The 104th Corps deployed the 206th and 4th Guards Airborne Divisions in its first echelon on a 4km-wide attack front, with the 163rd in second echelon, backed by the 11th Artillery Division, a heavy howitzer brigade, and 15 attached artillery brigades and regiments; in all the first echelon would have 985 guns, mortars and rocket launchers firing in support, including those of the 365th Artillery Regiment. 27th Army was deployed along its previous lines, northeast of Târgu Frumos.

The offensive began on the morning of August 20 following a powerful artillery preparation which lasted an hour and 40 minutes. 27th Army broke through the Axis front northwest of Iași between Spinoasa and Zahorna along a 20km-wide front and as early as 1100 hours had forced the Bahlui River. By 2000 hours the Army's forces had advanced 7–12km. In the face of Axis counterattacks by the end of the day the 104th Corps was southeast of a line from Kosiceni to Păușești. The first echelon rifle divisions had successfully carried out their combat tasks for the day; among these was opening a breach to allow the 6th Tank Army to be committed and begin its exploitation role. Among the Axis forces facing 2nd Ukrainian Front four Romanian front-line divisions and the German 76th Infantry Division suffered heavy losses and 3,000 officers and men were taken prisoner.

The following day the offensive resumed at 0600 hours. Assisted by the 5th Guards Tank Corps the 104th Corps crushed the resistance of the Romanian 18th Mountain and 13th Infantry Divisions and the German 76th Infantry and 1st Panzer Divisions before fighting through heavy forest to overcome the Mare ridge. By the end of the day the 104th Corps reached a line east of Sinești to Schitu Stavnic. On August 22, while the Corps crossed the Bârlad River the 163rd replaced the 206th Division in first echelon. The Front's goal for the next day was to help close the encirclement of the Axis Chișinău group of forces in conjunction with 3rd Ukrainian Front and by day's end 104th Corps had reached a line from Ivănești to Corodesti. On August 24 the 27th Army advanced as much as 30km as the remnants of the Romanian units it faced ceased offering resistance. By the end of the day the Corps was operating on a line from Oprișești to Fatacuni.

== Into the Balkans ==
In the following days the 163rd was briefly attached to the 6th Tank Army as it exploited towards Romania and on August 27 the 529th Rifle Regiment and the 365th Artillery Regiment were each awarded a honorific:

FOCSANI... 529th Rifle Regiment (Lieutenant Colonel Merkushin, Vasilii Sergeevich)... 365th Artillery Regiment (Lieutenant Colonel Timofeev, Viktor Yakovlevich)... The troops who participated in the capture of Focsani and Râmnicu Sărat, by the order of the Supreme High Command of 27 August 1944, and a commendation in Moscow, are given a salute of 20 artillery salvoes from 224 guns.

On September 15 the division as a whole would be awarded the Order of Kutuzov, 2nd Degree, for its part in the capture of Ploiești on August 30, while the 759th Regiment earned the Order of Bogdan Khmelnitsky, 2nd Degree, and the 1318th Regiment received the same award for the victory at Râmnicu Sărat.

During October the right-wing armies of the Front, including the 27th, cleared the region of Transylvania of Axis forces. On October 11 the 759th Rifle Regiment (Lieutenant Colonel Lepilkin, Fyodor Vasilevich) was awarded an honorific for its part in the capture of Cluj-Napoca. During the month the division was reassigned to 33rd Rifle Corps.

=== Budapest Offensive ===
During early November the right flank armies of the Front (40th, 27th, 53rd and Cavalry-Mechanized Group Pliev) continued their previous advance into southeastern Hungary while the left flank armies marched on Budapest. The 27th and 53rd Armies were facing units of German 6th Army, which included the III Panzer Corps, Hungarian 2nd Armored Division and five Hungarian infantry divisions, but the Panzer Corps was soon moved westward to deal with the thrust on the Hungarian capital. On the morning of November 4 the 27th Army was to relieve units of 53rd Army along a sector from Polgár to Tiszafüred but this was complicated by ongoing fighting for the former town. A renewed offensive began on November 7 and the right flank continued a slow advance until the 25th. During this period the 163rd was moved again, now back to the 104th Corps. At this point the 27th and 40th Armies were directed to regroup with the objective of capturing the Miskolc area. This important industrial and communications center was taken jointly by the two Armies on December 3. For this victory the 1318th Rifle Regiment (Lieutenant Colonel Klimenko, Pyotr Nikitovich) was awarded the name as a battle honor, while the 759th Regiment would receive the Order of the Red Banner on December 16. By the end of the day on December 19 the 27th Army was fighting along a front from 32–55km northeast of Gyöngyös.

=== Into Slovakia and Austria ===
During January 1945, the 163rd was reassigned to the 35th Guards Corps, where it would remain into the postwar. During that month it advanced through Slovakia and during February the 27th Army came under command of 3rd Ukrainian Front for the duration.

== Postwar ==
When the fighting stopped the division was one of the most decorated regular rifle units of the Red Army, with the full title of 163rd Rifle, Romny-Kiev, Order of Lenin, Order of the Red Banner, Orders of Suvorov and Kutuzov Division. (Russian: 163-я стрелковая Ромненско-Киевская ордена Ленина Краснознамённая орденов Суворова и Кутузова дивизия.) It remained under command of General Karlov until July; he would retire from the Red Army in 1953. From July until October it was led by Lt. Col. Vasilii Sergeevich Merkushin, who handed it over to Maj. Gen. Filipp Nikolaevich Romashin; this officer had previously led the 135th Rifle Division. 27th Army was disbanded in September after which 35th Guards Corps was transferred to the 38th Army in Carpathian Military District. From July 1946 to March 1947 it was under command of Maj. Gen. Grigorii Semyonovich Lazko, back in Ukraine as part of 38th Army at Kamianets-Podilskyi. Lazko had commanded the 30th Rifle Corps during the war and remained in command when the 163rd was converted to the 25th Mechanized Division.

== Distinguished fighter ==
Starshina Semyon Danilovich Nomokonov was a sniper who served in the 163rd until the end of 1943 and thereafter in the 695th Rifle Regiment of the 221st Rifle Division. Born in 1900, he was an ethnic Hamnigan and began using a rifle at the age of seven. During the course of the war he was credited with 367 kills, using an un-scoped Mosin-Nagant M91/30 and received the nickname "Taiga Shaman" from the German and Finnish soldiers he faced. He was wounded eight times and twice injured by nearby shell explosions. He was awarded the Order of Lenin, among other decorations. He returned home after the war and died in June 1973.
