= Battle of Suomussalmi =

Battle in the Winter War

- Part of the Winter War
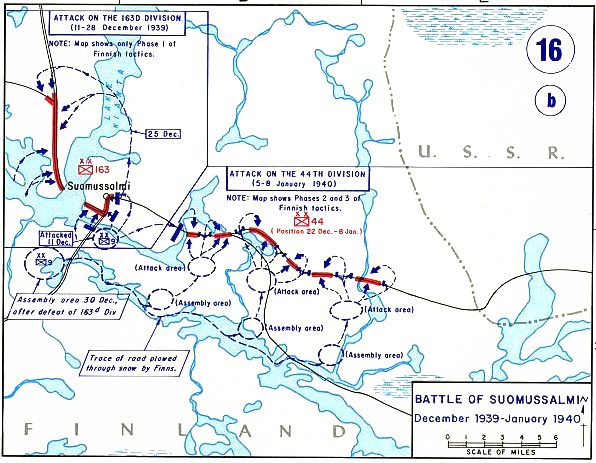
| Date | 30 November 1939 – 8 January 1940 |
| Location | Suomussalmi, Kainuu region, Finland 64°53′18″N 28°53′20″E |
| Result | Finnish victory |

Belligerents
| Finland | Soviet Union |

Commanders and leaders
| (Finland) Wiljo Tuompo (Finland) Hjalmar Siilasvuo (Finland) Paavo Susitaival (Finland) Kaarle Kari | (Soviet Union) Mikhail Dukhanov (Soviet Union) Vasily Chuikov (Soviet Union) Ivan Dashichev (Soviet Union) Alexei Vinogradov (Soviet Union) Andrei Zelentsov |

Units involved
| North Finland Group | 9th Army |

Strength
| 17,000 | 48,000 |

Casualties and losses
| 2,700 casualties | 12,972 to 29,100 casualties (Note: One estimate concludes 27,000 KIA alone); See casualties |
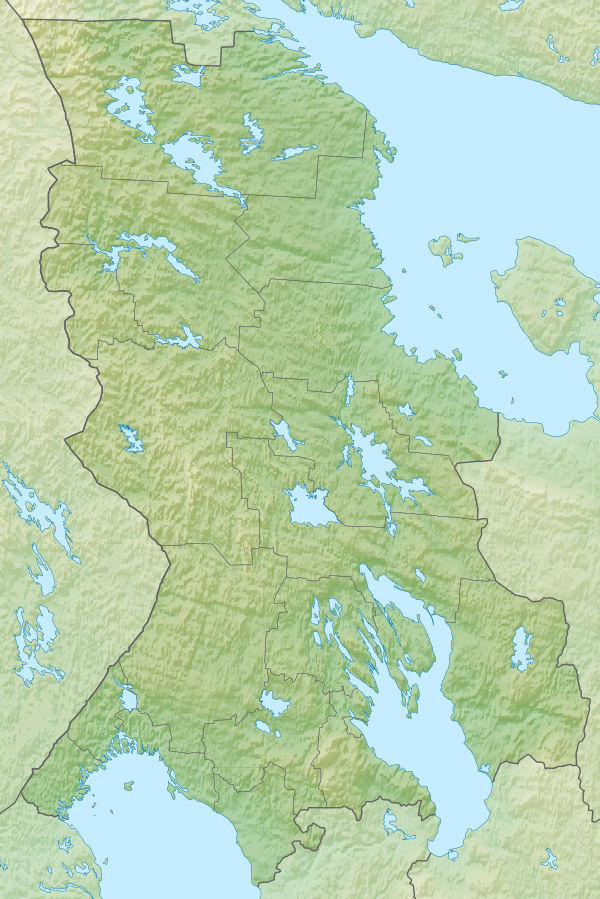
- Location within Finland Battle of Suomussalmi (Karelia)

The Battle of Suomussalmi was fought between Finnish and Soviet forces in the Winter War. The action took place from 30 November 1939 to 8 January 1940. The outcome was a Finnish victory against superior forces. The battle is considered the war's clearest, most important, and most significant Finnish victory in the northern half of Finland.

== Order of battle ==
=== Soviet army ===
9th Army

- 163rd Rifle Division
- Parts of 47th Rifle Corps
- 44th Rifle Division

=== Finnish army ===
North Finland Group

- Susi Group (Ryhmä Susi)
- Siilasvuo Group
- 9th Infantry Division

== Course of battle ==
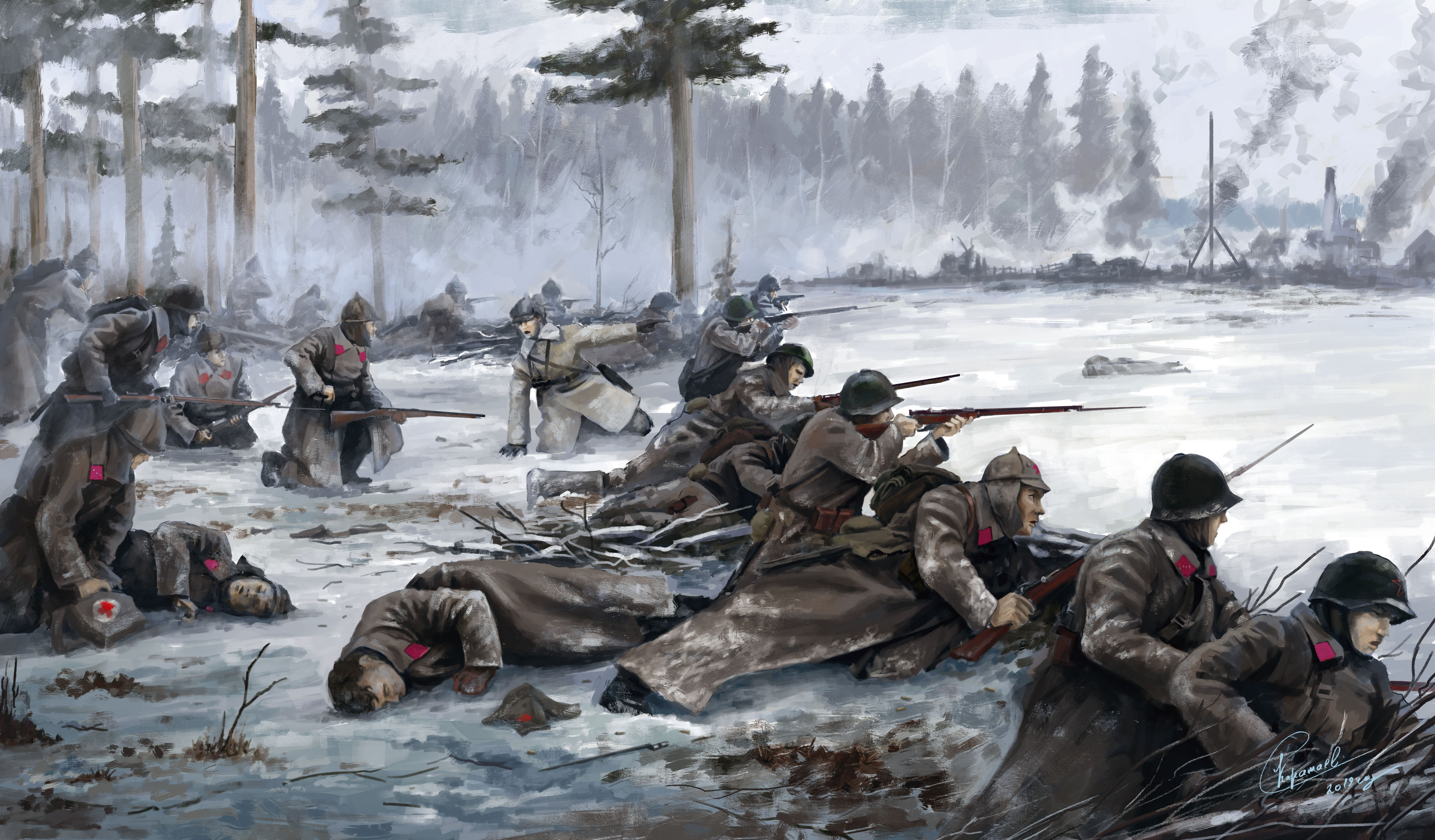
163rd Division in the Battle of Suomussalmi

On 30 November 1939, Zelentsov leading the Soviet 163rd Rifle Division (the 81st and Sharov's 662nd Infantry Regiments with tanks and cavalry) left Ukhta and crossed the border near Juntusranta, while the 759th Infantry Regiment and Division reconnaissance battalion crossed at Raate, as the Soviets advanced towards Suomussalmi. The Soviet objective was to advance to the city of Oulu, effectively cutting Finland in half. At the road connecting Peranka with Hyrynsalmi, the 662nd turned north intending to capture Peranka, while the 81st regiment turned south to join the 759th in attacking Suomussalmi. On 4 December, the Finnish Independent battalion (ErP 15) and the 4th Field Replacement Battalion fought the Soviets from Raate to Suomussalmi, but Suomussalmi was captured on 7 December. On 6 December, I. Pallari's ErP 16 stopped the Soviet advance on Peranka at the Piispajärvi straits. Paavo Susitaival took over command of Task Force Susi north and east of the Palovaara junction, while Salske took command of ErP 16 after Pallari was wounded.

By 9 December the Hjalmar Siilasvuo's Regiment JR 27 had arrived, stopping the Soviet advance towards Hyrynsalmi at a ferry just south of Suomussalmi. By the 11th, JR 27 had severed the Soviet Raate road communication link to the east of Suomussalmi. A Finnish battalion then cut off Soviet communications at Hulkonniemi, northwest of Suomussalmi. Over the next two weeks, Siilasvuo was able to contain the Soviets, while Finnish artillery arrived. On 25 December, Siilasvuo's forces were reorganized as the 9th Division, with the addition of Regiment JR 64, guerilla battalion Sissi P1, and bicycle battalion PPP 6. On 27 December, Task Force Susi, reinforced by Regiment JR 65, captured Palovaara, preventing the Soviet 662nd Regiment from supporting the rest of the 163rd Division.

On 21 December, Mäkinen led Finnish raiding parties in attacking Vinogradov's 44th Motorized Infantry Division advancing along Battle of Raate Road.

On 24 December, surrounded on all sides in the Hulkonniemi-Suomussalmi area, Zelentsov tried to break out to the south, but was stopped by JR 27's Second Battalion. On 25 December, the Soviets tried to break out to the west, but were once again stopped. On 27 December, Siilasvuo made his move, with Kaarle Kari attacking from the northwest along columns led by Frans Fagernäs and Martti Harola, while Battalion PPP 6 struck from the north, and Paavola prevented any northern movement along Lake Kiantajärvi.

On 28 December, around 9 A.M., according to Chew, "Russian resistance suddenly collapsed in front of Fagernäs, the men bolted from their positions, some towards Suomussalmi village, others onto the ice of Lake Kiantajärvi - a few throwing away their weapons in their haste. This retreat sealed the fate of the 163rd Division, although the battle continued against its remnants for two more days. The 163rd Division no longer existed - there were only a few hundred cold, hungry, frightened men who abandoned their weapons and fled in panic towards the Soviet border beyond Juntusranta, some 20 miles to the northeast. The rout developed into a slaughter..."

== Outcome ==
The battle resulted in a major victory for the Finns. If the Soviet Union had captured the city of Oulu, the Finns would have had to defend the country on two fronts and an important rail link to Sweden would have been severed. The battle also gave a decisive boost to the morale of the Finnish army.

In addition, Finnish forces on the Raate-Suomussalmi road captured a large amount of military supplies, including tanks (43), field guns (70), trucks (278), horses (1,170), anti-tank guns (29), machine guns (300), rifles (6000) and other weapons, which were greatly needed by the Finnish army.

Alvar Aalto sculpted a memorial for the Finnish soldiers who died.

== Casualties ==
Soviet troops suffered heavy losses, but estimates on the severity of these losses vary depending on the source. American historian Allen Chew estimated the figure of total Soviet casualties to be 22,500. David Campbell estimates 22,500 to 27,000 Soviet casualties. Brian Best estimates 27,000 Soviets KIA and 2,100 captured.

In Russian historiography, until the collapse of the USSR, the issue of losses was not covered in any way. Pavel Aptekar was one of the first to touch upon the issue of losses; however, his data does not reflect the full picture of the battle, but they call the losses of the 44th division to be, according to him, 4,000 people and 80 tanks. Ten years later, an article by another historian, Oleg Kiselev, was published, which tracked the dynamics of losses of all formations during the battle. As a result, he came to this conclusion:

| Battle of Suomussalmi | KIA | WIA | MIA | Frostbitten | Total |
|---|---|---|---|---|---|
| Soviet casualties | 2,303 | 4,001 | 3,868 | 2,800 | 12,972 |

== Analysis ==
The Battle of Suomussalmi is often cited as an example of how a small force, properly led and fighting in familiar terrain, can defeat a vastly numerically superior enemy. Factors which contributed to the Finnish victory included:

- Finnish troops possessed higher mobility due to skis and sleds; by contrast, Soviet heavy equipment confined them to roads.
- The Soviet objective to cut Finland in half across the Oulu region, while appearing reasonable on a map, was inherently unrealistic, as the region was mostly forested marshland, with its road network consisting mainly of logging trails. Mechanized divisions had to rely on them and so became easy targets for the mobile Finnish ski troops.
- Finnish strategy was flexible and often unorthodox, for example, Finnish troops targeted Soviet field kitchens, which demoralised Soviet soldiers fighting in a sub-Arctic winter.
- The Soviet army was poorly equipped, especially with regard to winter camouflage clothing; by contrast, Finnish troops' equipment were well-suited for warfare in deep snow and freezing temperatures.
- The Finnish army had very high morale, resulting from the fact that it was defending their nation. Soviet troops, however, had exclusively political reasons for their attack, consequently losing their will to fight soon despite continual efforts by Soviet propagandists.
- An additional factor remained Soviet counter-intelligence failures: Finnish troops often intercepted the Soviet communications, which relied heavily on standard phone lines.
- The Finnish tactics involved simplicity where needed, as the final assault was a simple head-on charge, which decreased the chances of tactical errors. Rough weather also favoured comparatively simple plans.

== See also ==
- Battle of Raate Road
- List of Finnish military equipment of World War II
- List of Soviet Union military equipment of World War II
