= Battle of Raate Road =

Battle of the Winter War

- Part of the Winter War
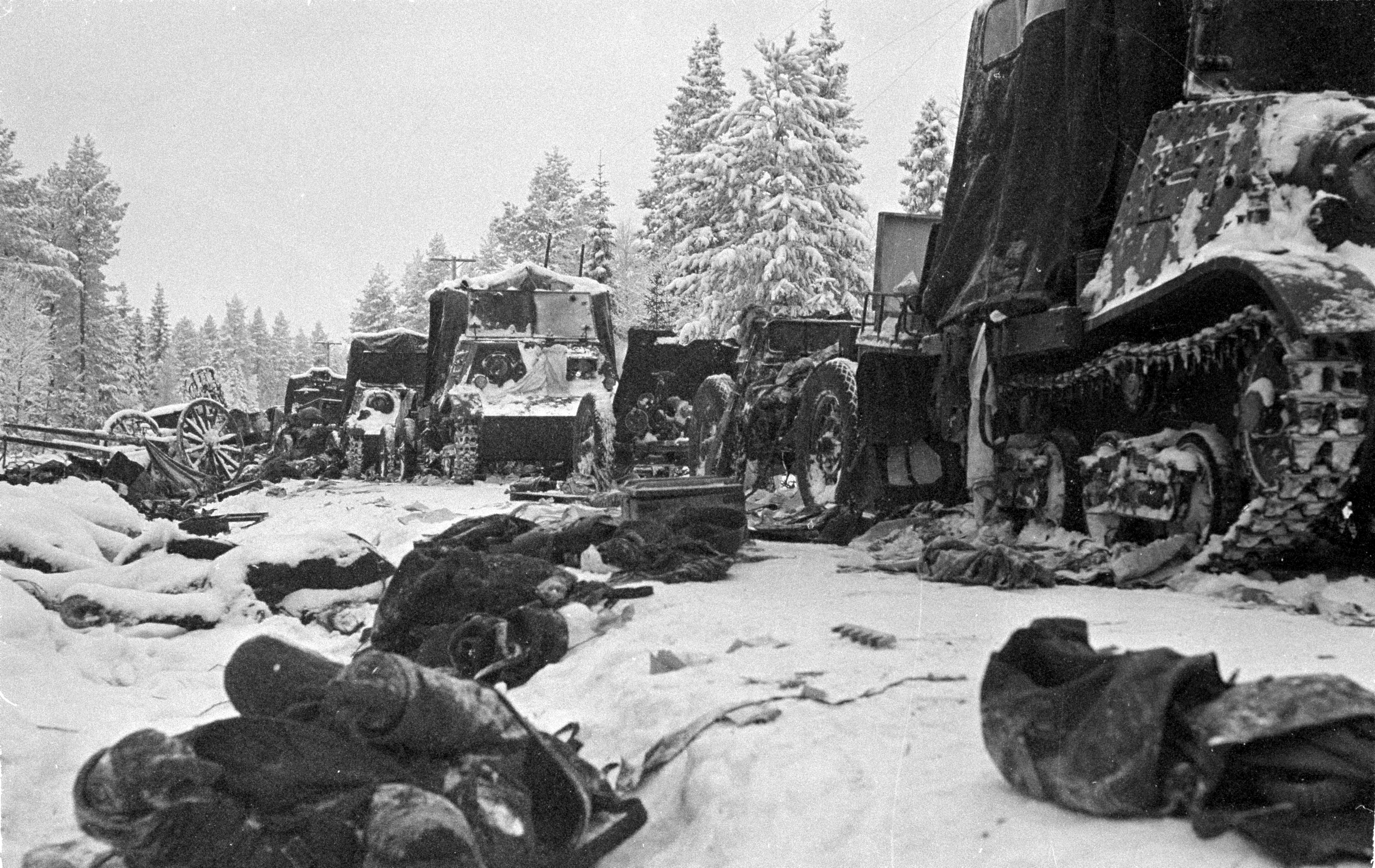
- Fragment of the destroyed Soviet column on the road
| Date | 1–7 January 1940 |
| Location | Suomussalmi, Raate Road 64°50′53″N 29°19′35″E |
| Result | Finnish victory |

Belligerents
| Finland | Soviet Union |

Commanders and leaders
| (Finland) Hjalmar Siilasvuo | (Soviet Union) Alexei Vinogradov (executed) |

Strength
| 6,000 | 13,962–25,000 (Officially) |

Casualties and losses
| 310 killed 618 wounded 92 missing | 4,674 casualties (according to the Soviets) 7,000–9,000 killed 1,300 captured (according to Finnish estimates) |
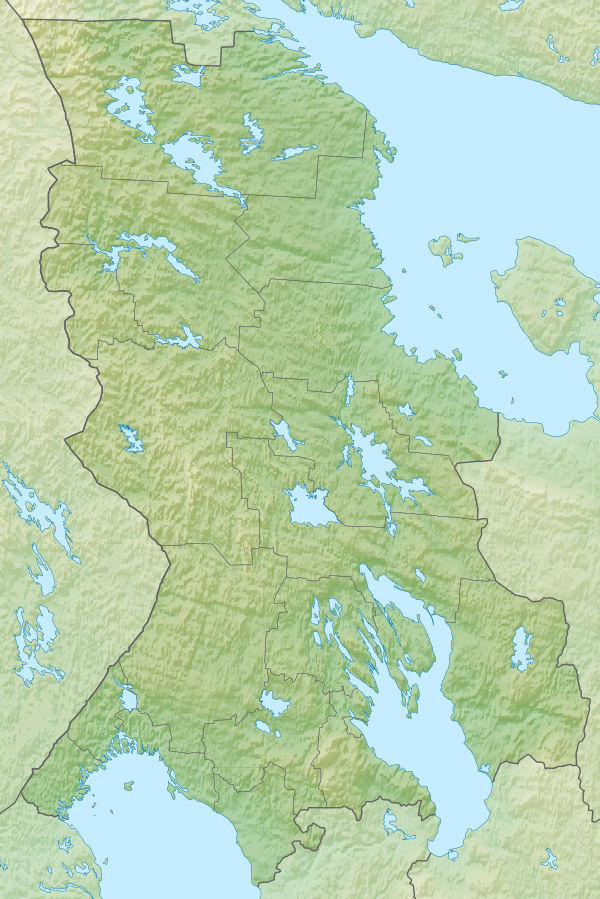
- Location within Finland Battle of Raate Road (Karelia)

The Battle of Raate Road (Finnish: Raatteen tien taistelu) was fought during the Winter War between the Soviet Union and Finland in January 1940, as a part of the Battle of Suomussalmi.

On December 7, 1939, the Soviet 163rd Rifle Division captured Suomussalmi, but found itself trapped deep inside Finnish territory, and the Soviet 44th Rifle Division was sent to aid the 163rd. Over the next week, Colonel Hjalmar Siilasvuo's outnumbered 9th Division stopped and decisively defeated the Soviet forces on the Raate-Suomussalmi road.

== Background ==
During the Battle of Suomussalmi, the Finns cut the Raate Road on December 11, 1939. The action blocked the second, southern supply route to the Soviet 163rd Rifle Division in the town of Suomussalmi. The Finns also cut the first, northern supply route on 13 December, and the Soviets were forced to open a new supply route through Lake Kiantajärvi. The 163rd Division was nearly surrounded and suffered major casualties in Suomussalmi. The situation was getting worse, and on 20 December the commander of the 163rd Division, Andrei Zelentsov, asked permission to retreat from Suomussalmi. In response, part of the 44th Division, the 1st Battalion of the 305th Rifle Regiment, and the 3rd Battalion of the 662nd Rifle Regiment, were sent to reinforce the 163rd Division troops near Suomussalmi. Zelentsov's concerns were not understood at Red Army headquarters, as the entire 44th Division was about to move along the Raate Road. The well trained Soviet 81st Mountain Rifles Regiment played a major role in the Battle of Suomussalmi.

Most military historians date the Battle of the Raate Road from 1 January to 7 January 1940. The Raate Road was a battlefield during the entire Winter War. Before the main battle against the 44th Division, the Finns fought defensive battles against a part of 163rd Division on the Raate Road. In addition, some battles were fought on the east side, near the border, on the road during the rest of the Winter War.

== Battle ==
At the start of the battle, Siilasvuo's 9th Division had already destroyed the Soviet 163rd Division. According to Chew, "Incredibly, Commander Vinogradov had not even made a determined attempt to rescue the 163rd Division while it was being destroyed virtually within earshot." By the 28th December, he ordered "...his division to dig in for defense on the Raate road." Yet the division was stretched over 20 miles along the road from the Haukila farm area road block to the border. The division's heaviest defense consisted of the 25th Regiment, the second battalion of the 146th Regiment, plus tanks and artillery were located nearest the road block.

On 1 January, Siilasvuo deployed four task groups for coordinated flank attacks on the Soviets. Task Force Mandelin was located north of Haulila, Task Force Mäkiniemi south of Haulila, Task Force Kari south of Eskola, and Task Force Fagernäs Heikkilä and Vänkä. That night, Lassila's First Battalion of Regiment JR 27 attacked the Soviet artillery battalion deployed on the Raate road 500 yards east of the Haukila farm. The Soviets were overrun, road blocks set up east and west along the Finnish occupied road and antitank guns in place to stop Soviet counterattacks the following morning and afternoon. The Finnish encirclement, motti, targeted Soviet field kitchens, with their associated camp fires, as the Russians grew cold and hungry. On 2 January, Airimo's Third Battalion JR 27 attacked the road to the west of Lassila's position, as Häkkinen moved his guerilla battalion closer to Haukila in support. On the same day, Paavola's light battalion attacked the located on Sanginlampi farm, which was captured the next day after support from Kari's Fourth Replacement Battalion. Also on 3 January, Sissi's P1 guerilla company cut the road north of Eskola, enabling ErP 15 to capture Eskola on 4 January. Task Force Kari was now within two miles of the Kokkojärvi road fork. In addition, Task Force Fagernäs had moved to within four miles of the road. Siilasvuo ordered that the attack to eliminate the 44th Division should commence on 5 January. Russian resistance was stiff, hindering Finnish advances, though they did destroy the Purasjoki bridge, which eliminated future Soviet truck traffic.

The battles focused on Haukila, where most of the Soviet troops were located and where squadrons "Mandelin" and "Mäkiniemi" attacked. Squadron "Mäkiniemi" had started moving towards Haukila a few days before the official attack. At the same time, the fresh 3rd NKVD Border Guard Regiment was just arriving to assist the Soviet 44th Division. The Finnish troops held strong blocking positions reinforced with mines at several points in the midst of the Soviet column. During January 6, heavy fighting occurred all along the Raate Road as the Finns continued to break up the enemy forces into smaller pieces. The Soviets attempted to overrun Finnish roadblocks with armor, losing numerous tanks in frontal attacks, but were unsuccessful. Finally, at 21:30, Alexei Vinogradov belatedly ordered his division to retreat to the Soviet border.

The despairing Soviet troops began to escape north over Lake Kiantajärvi. Many soldiers froze to death without proper clothing or supplies. Remnants of Soviet units had already tried to escape to the east, but were blocked by squadron "Kari". Further in the east, squadron "Fagernäs" could not keep a strategic bridge under Finnish control. On January 7, squadron "Fagernäs" recaptured the bridge and before noon all Soviet resistance was suppressed. The mopping-up went on for two days, during which the Finns rounded up hundreds of starving, freezing Soviet soldiers. Other remnants of the 44th Division were forced to withdraw from the area, fleeing through the northern forests pursued by the Finns, finally reaching the border in several small groups.

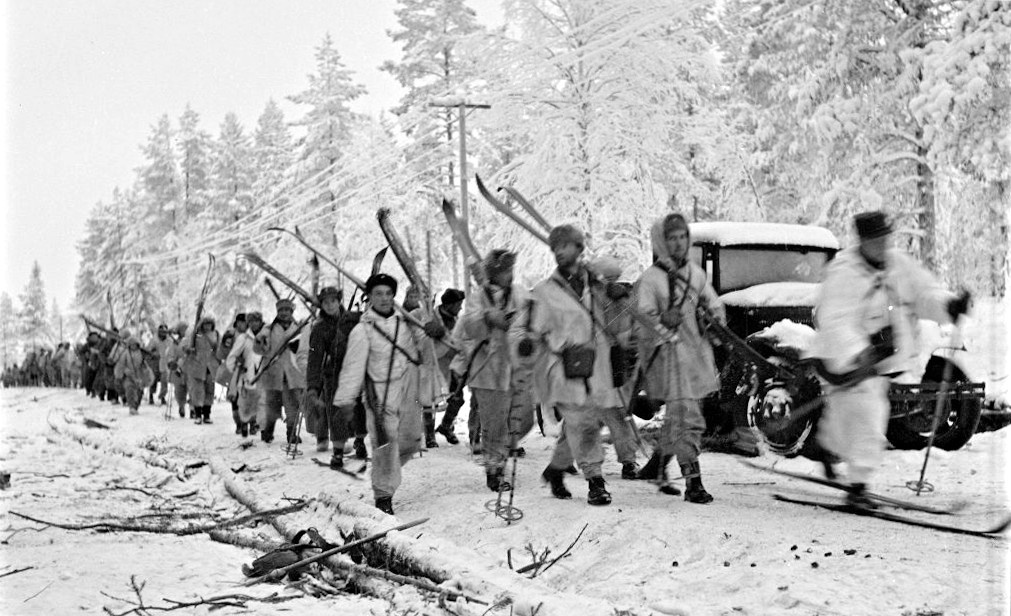
Finnish soldiers on Raate Road

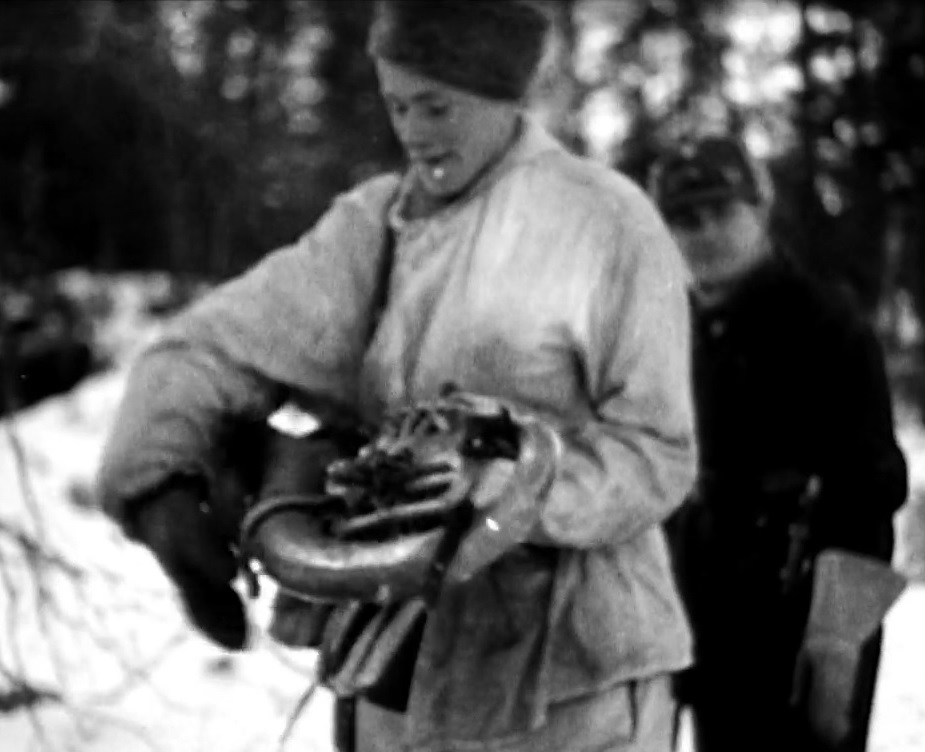
A Finnish soldier examines a Soviet tuba found among the many musical instruments that the destroyed division was carrying for a victory parade to be held in a vanquished Finland.

The Finnish army captured a tremendous amount of materiel in this battle. The Soviets had been so sure of their victory that a military band, complete with instruments, banners and notes, had traveled with the 44th Division to perform in a victory parade. The Finns found their instruments among the captured materiel.

Captured material
| Finnish statistics | Soviet statistics |
|---|---|
| 4,822 rifles | 4,340 rifles |
| 106 machine guns | 97 machine guns |
| 190 light machine guns | 252 light machine guns |
| 71 artillery pieces | 55 artillery pieces |
| 29 anti-tank guns | 30 anti-tank guns |
| 14 anti-tank rifles | 12 anti-tank rifles |
| 43 tanks | 37 tanks |
| 10 armored cars | |
| 260 trucks | |
| 20 tractors | |
| 2 cars | |
| 1,170 horses | |

== Casualties ==
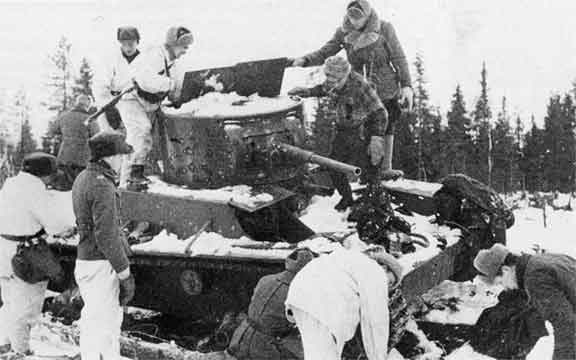
Finnish soldiers inspecting an abandoned Soviet T-26 model 1933 light tank at Raate. January 1940.

For many years, Finnish historians estimated the Soviet losses to be around 17,000 men. The estimation was based on the interrogation of the prisoners of war captured in early January. Officers of the Soviet 27th Infantry Regiment had given their casualties at 70 percent and the Finns assumed that the strength of the 44th Division was over 20,000 men. Western historians conformed their figures to Finnish estimations. The Soviets challenged the number of casualties published in the Western world immediately in January and claimed to have lost no more than 900 men, mostly from frostbite, while inflicting an estimated 2,000 Finn fatalities. Later Finnish historians conducted further efforts to ascertain the number of Soviet casualties in the battle. The Finns captured over 5,000 rifles, and the North Finland Group replaced 1,200 old rifles with the newer Soviet models. Most recent Finnish studies indicate that the Soviets lost at least 7,000–9,000 men.

The Finns quickly buried the Soviet dead as the weather warmed during the early spring to reduce the risk of epidemics. Mass graves were marked on maps and were mounted with a cross or a pole. Later, the maps disappeared. Around Easter, the Soviets made a request to gather the dead and take them back home. The Finns did not allow Red Army officials to cross the border but delivered 300 bodies from near the village of Raate to Soviet officials. After the Continuation War, the Soviet hierarchy lost interest in their deceased. The Red Army soon occupied the Raate Road and gathered wartime debris but left the bodies alone. The fate of the Soviet 44th Division remained unmentioned in Soviet historiography for decades.

According to the Russian historian Yuri Kilin, the Stavka set up a research commission in January 1940 to investigate the number of casualties. The Commission reported 4,674 total casualties: 1,001 dead, 1,430 wounded and 2,243 missing. At the turn of the year, the strength of the division was 13,962 men and by the end of the battle it was at 9,288 men. According to the report, the division was understaffed, because two battalions of the 305th Rifle Regiment were deployed elsewhere. Kilin calculated that some troops returned after the report, so the number of the missing is lower. Later, research by the Ukrainian historian Oleg Bozhko yielded similar numbers as he used the same source. The Stavka report was published in January 1940, in the middle of the Winter War. The statistics of the report start from 1 January, and by this time the division had already suffered heavy losses for two weeks. The Stavka report did not mention casualties suffered on the Raate Road by other units, along the advancement of the 44th Division.

== Aftermath ==
Thereafter, the area saw only a few minor skirmishes.

=== Soviet executions ===
The Soviet commander, Vinogradov, and two of his chief officers, Volkov and Pahomov, retreated in the middle of crucial battles. According to the Stavka report, this act had a fatal influence on morale. As they reached the Soviet lines four days later they were court-martialed, found guilty and sentenced to death; the executions were carried out immediately. The Stavka itself had made the crucial decisions to keep the 44th Division on the Raate Road after the 163rd had lost Suomussalmi village.

A Ukrainian veteran of the Raate Road, Sergeant Pyotr Andrevich Morozov, was interviewed in 1991 by the Finnish non-fiction writer Leo Karttimo. According to Morozov the Finns returned prisoners of war, but none of them managed to get back to their homes as the Soviet secret service NKVD executed them all in summer 1940.

=== Monuments ===
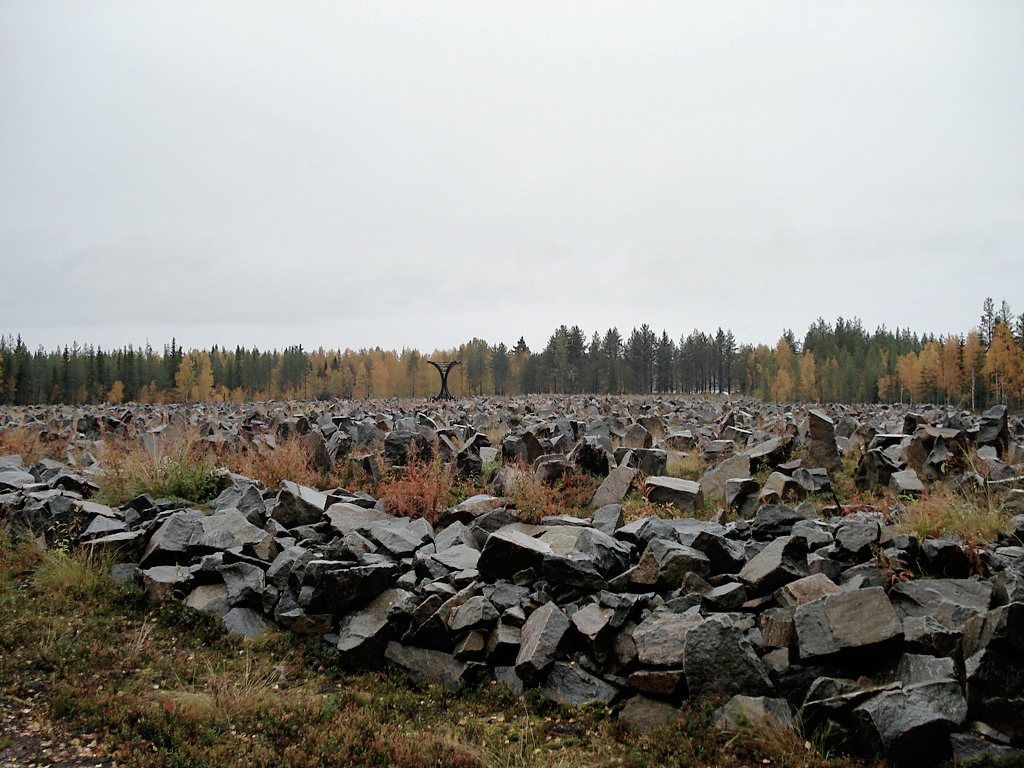
The Monument of the Winter War

Today, the former battlefield is the site of the Monument of the Winter War, designed by Erkki Pullinen, dedicated to all who died in the war on both sides. The memorial includes a field of thousands of stones as symbolic gravestones of the Soviet soldiers who fell in the battle. The Russian monument was installed in September 1994, and the Ukrainians installed their own monument in the spring of 1998.

== See also ==
- List of Finnish military equipment of World War II
- List of Soviet Union military equipment of World War II

== Sources ==
- Kantakoski, Pekka (1998). Punaiset panssarit : Puna-armeijan panssarijoukot 1918–1945 (in Finnish). Hauho: PS-Elso. ISBN 951-98057-0-2.
- Kulju, Mika (2007). Raatteen tie : Talvisodan pohjoinen sankaritarina (in Finnish). Helsinki: Ajatus kirjat. ISBN 978-951-20-7218-7.
- Karttimo, Leo; Salminen, K. E. (1992). Rannikolta Raatteen tielle : sotaveteraanien haastatteluihin, sotapäiväkirjoihin sekä moniin muihin lähteisiin perustuva teos (in Finnish). ISBN 952-90-3809-7.
- Sotatieteen laitos (1991). Talvisodan historia (in Finnish). Porvoo: Werner Söderström Osakeyhtiö. ISBN 951-0-17565-X.
- Raunio, Ari; Kilin, Yuri (2005). Itsenäisyyden puolustajat: Sodan taisteluja 1. Talvisota (in Finnish). Weilin+Göös. ISBN 951-593-911-9.
- Winter War 1939-40: Finnish Soldier Versus Soviet Soldier by David Campbell
