= Hjalmar Siilasvuo =

Finnish general (1892–1947)

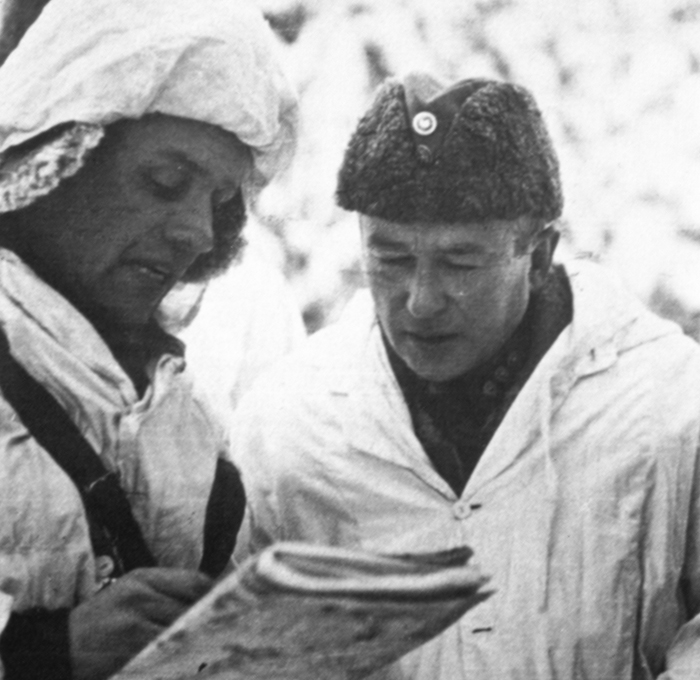
- Hjalmar Siilasvuo (right) receiving a situation report during the Battle of Raate Road
- Born: 18 March 1892; Helsinki, Grand Duchy of Finland
- Died: 11 January 1947 (aged 54); Oulu, Finland
- Burial place: Oulu Cemetery
- Relatives: General Ensio Siilasvuo (son)
- Military career
- Allegiance: German Empire (1915–1918); Finland (from 1918)
- Branch: Imperial German Army; Finnish Jäger troops; Finnish Army
- Service years: 1915–1947
- Rank: Lieutenant general
- Commands: 1st Division (1944–47); III Corps (1941–42; 1944); 9th Division (1939–1940)
- Conflicts: World War I; Eastern Front; Finnish Civil War; Battle of Tampere; Battle of Viipuri; World War II; Winter War; Battle of Suomussalmi; Battle of Raate Road; Battle of Kuhmo; Continuation War; Operation Silver Fox; Svir–Petrozavodsk offensive; Battle of Vuosalmi; Lapland War; Battle of Tornio
- Awards: Mannerheim Cross; Grand Cross of the Order of the White Rose of Finland; Order of the Cross of Liberty; Order of the Sword (Sweden); Order of the German Eagle; Iron Cross, 1st Class (Germany)
- Other work: Writings, Municipal Council

Hjalmar Fridolf Siilasvuo (born Hjalmar Fridolf Strömberg, 18 March 1892 – 11 January 1947) was a Finnish lieutenant general (Finnish: kenraaliluutnantti), a knight of the Mannerheim Cross and a member of the Jäger Movement. He participated in the Eastern Front of World War I, the Finnish Civil War, the Winter War, Continuation War and the Lapland War.

== Early life ==
Hjalmar Fridolf Siilasvuo was born as Hjalmar Fridolf Strömberg on 18 March 1892 in Helsinki to newspaper reporter Frans Strömberg and Hulda Röman. He graduated as an ylioppilas in 1911 from Svenska normallyceum i Helsingfors and began to study law. During his studies, he became involved in the Jäger Movement, which aimed at sending Finnish volunteers to receive military training in Germany. As a member of the movement, Siilavuo left for Germany in early 1915. While in Germany, the Finnish volunteers formed the 27th Royal Prussian Jäger Battalion, fighting for the Imperial German Army on the Eastern Front of World War I. During this time, Siilasvuo took part in several battles in the regions of Misa, Gulf of Riga and Lielupe.

Siilasvuo returned to Finland in 1918 together with the bulk of the Finnish Jägers, taking part in the Finnish Civil War on the side of the Whites. First a lieutenant, but soon promoted to captain, Siilasvuo saw action as a company commander in the Battles of Tampere and Viipuri. Siilasvuo was given command of a battalion in late 1918. In 1920, he was promoted to a major and married pharmacist Salli Kolsi. The couple had three children between 1922 and 1926.

In 1926, Siilasvuo graduated from War College, was promoted to a lieutenant colonel and transferred to the Ministry of Defence Department of War Affairs (Finnish: sota-asiain osasto) where he was promoted to a chief of office (Finnish: toimistopäällikkö) in 1927 and to head of department in 1928. Later in 1928, he again took command of a battalion, which was followed by a promotion to both the rank of colonel and the command of a brigade/regiment in 1933. He was given command of the Pohjanmaa military district in 1934. In 1936, he finnicized his surname from the Swedish Strömberg to Siilasvuo and became a member of the Oulu city council. He held the position until 1940.

== Winter War and Interim Peace ==
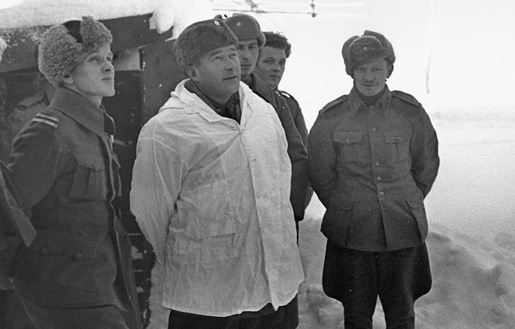
General Hjalmar Siilasvuo in 1939

During the Finno-Soviet Winter War of 1939–1940, Siilasvuo was in charge of the Finnish forces in the region of Suomussalmi. The initially approximately brigade-sized formation under his command eventually grew to a size where it was reorganized as the 9th Division. The Battle of Suomussalmi, as the actions in the region came to be known, resulted in the shattering of the Soviet 163rd Rifle Division which had been encircled in Suomussalmi, as well as the destruction of the Soviet 44th Rifle Division, which was attempting to reinforce the 163rd Division, in the Battle of Raate Road. The defense of Siilasvuo's forces prevented the Soviet 9th Army from reaching Oulu, which would have resulted in the bisection of Finland into two separate theatres of operation. Siilasvuo's forces were still engaged in the Battle of Kuhmo when the war ended.

In 1940, Siilasvuo was promoted to major general and was given command of the peace-time army's V Corps. The same year, he also published a book on the Battle of Suomussalmi. Historian Mikko Uola describes the book as "taking all credit for the success of Suomussalmi and completely ignoring other commanders who influenced the events, such as Siilasvuo's superiors Viljo Tuompo and Paavo Susitaival, as well as his subordinates such as Alpo Marttinen."

== Continuation War and Lapland War ==
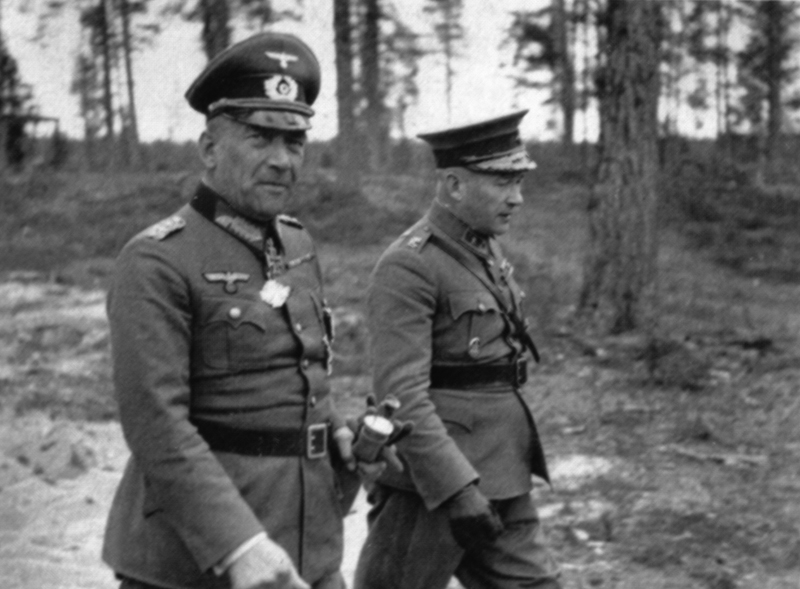
General Nikolaus von Falkenhorst (left) with Major General Hjalmar Siilasvuo (right) at the start of the Continuation War.

During the 1941 Finno-German negotiations regarding plans for a future war with the Soviet Union, the Germans proposed that the Finns would be in charge of operations in the south-eastern Finland and east of Lake Ladoga, with overall command of both Finnish and German troops in the area falling under the Finnish commander-in-chief, Marshal Mannerheim. In turn, the Finns would subordinate Siilasvuo's peace-time V Corps (which would become the war time III Corps) to the headquarters of the German Army of Norway. Following the start of the Finnish mobilization on 10 June 1941, the corps was subordinated to the headquarters of the German Army of Norway on 15 June 1941, and was designated III Corps on 18 June 1941.

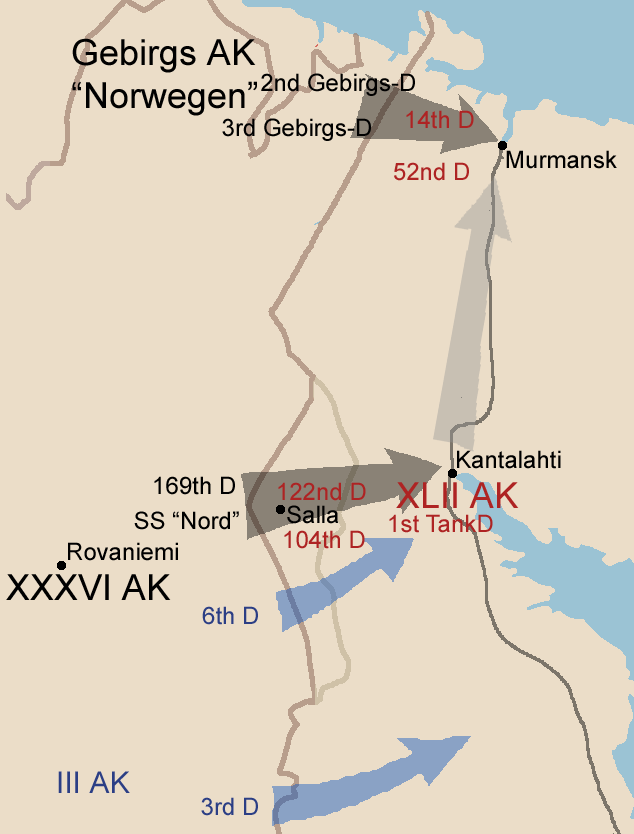
Original plan for Operation Silver Fox

According to the German plans, Siilasvuo's III Corps was to secure the southern flank of Operation Silver Fox, the German-led operation whose goal was the capture of Murmansk. The corps was to advance first to the Ukhta–Kestenga line and then to the Murmansk railroad and Kem. It soon became apparent that III Corps was the only corps-level unit of the Army of Norway to make significant progress. Operations of the two German corps of the Army of Norway were thus largely halted, and German reinforcements were allocated to support the attack of the III Corps. The main objective of the III Corps was to be the Murmansk railroad in the area of Loukhi. Despite the German reinforcements, III Corps was unable to reach Loukhi and by August both sides had settled for stationary warfare.

By 6 October 1941, the situation at the front had improved to a point where Nikolaus von Falkenhorst and Siilasvuo discussed continuing the III Corps's advance towards Loukhi. Due to Hitler's August order that the forces in the area were to go on the defensive, the plan was phrased as III Corp improving its positions. The Finnish high command was informed about the operation on 25 October, but nobody informed the German high command, OKH. The operation began on 30 October, but already on 5 November Siilasvuo was informed by the Finnish high command that the attack should be halted for political reasons, and that no additional Finnish reinforcements would be forthcoming despite Siilasvuo's wishes. The United States of America had given the Finnish government a note demanding the attack be stopped, which in turn had resulted in the Finnish President Risto Ryti expressing his concern over the operation to Mannerheim. By 11 November, Siilasvuo was actively slowing down the attack by ordering construction of further field fortifications and on 17 November he gave a written order to halt the attack. By December the fighting in the area had calmed down. Siilasvuo was promoted to lieutenant general in 1942 and, in late 1942, was made the inspector of military schools. Siilasvuo himself viewed this transfer as a punishment.

Following the end of the Siege of Leningrad in January 1944, the Finnish high command began preparations for a Soviet offensive. As part of these preparations it split the Kannas Group, responsible for the defence of the Karelian Isthmus, into two corps-level formations on 4 March 1944. The eastern side of the isthmus was handed to the III Corps, the headquarters of which was moved to the area from northern Finland, with Siilasvuo reinstated as the commander of the corps. The Soviet Vyborg–Petrozavodsk offensive began on 9 July 1944. Threatened to be cut off, III Corps fell back and eventually took defensive positions along Vuoksi. The III Corps front stabilized along the Vuoksi for the rest of the war, with the Soviet forces failing to break through on the III Corps sector despite several attempts.

As one of the terms of the Moscow Armistice, Finland had to remove any German forces remaining in Finland. German forces in the Finnish north initially fell back towards Norway in unofficial cooperation with the Finnish forces. However, following the failure of Operation Tanne Ost which involved a German attempt to capture Gogland from its Finnish defenders, the Finno-German cooperation completely broke down. During the subsequent Lapland War, Siilasvuo's III Corps was moved to northern Finland where it took overall command of all Finnish forces participating in the operation. Over the following months, Siilasvuo's forces slowly pushed the Germans out of Lapland, with the final German forces leaving Finland on 27 April 1945. Siilasvuo was awarded with the Mannerheim Cross in December 1944, with the bestowal document referencing his actions in the Winter War, the Continuation War and the Lapland War.

== Death and legacy ==
Following the end of the Lapland War, Siilasvuo remained in military service, acting as the commander of the 1st Division from 1944 to 1947. He died in Oulu on 11 January 1947, and is buried in the Oulu Cemetery.

Siilasvuo's son Ensio Siilasvuo, who had served as a platoon leader, staff officer and company commander in III Corps during the Continuation War, also became a Finnish general following service in peace-keeping duties for the United Nations.

During his life, Siilasvuo was granted several Finnish awards, the most notable of which are Mannerheim Cross 2nd Class, the Grand Cross of the Order of the White Rose of Finland and the Order of the Cross of Liberty. He also received the German Iron Cross (both 1st and 2nd Class) and the Order of the German Eagle; and the Swedish Order of the Sword.
