= Pesiöjärvi =

Lake in Finland

- Location within Finland
- Coordinates: 64°57′N 28°40′E
- Type: Lake
- Primary inflows: river Mahajoki from the lake Pieni Pesiöjärvi
- Primary outflows: river Pesiönjoki to the lake Kiantajärvi
- Catchment area: Oulujoki
- Basin countries: Finland
- Surface area: 12.741 km^{2} (4.919 sq mi)
- Average depth: 3.94 m (12.9 ft)
- Max. depth: 15.82 m (51.9 ft)
- Water volume: 0.0502 km^{3} (40,700 acre⋅ft)
- Shore length^{1}: 53.89 km (33.49 mi)
- Surface elevation: 213.9 m (702 ft)
- Frozen: December–May
- Islands: Honkasaari, Kumpusaari, Pesiösaari, Lehtosaari
- ^{1} Shore length is not a well-defined measure.

Pesiöjärvi is a medium-sized lake in the Oulujoki main catchment area. It is located in Suomussalmi municipality, in the region Kainuu, Finland.

== See also ==
- List of lakes in Finland
