= Voinești, Iași =

Voinești
- Commune
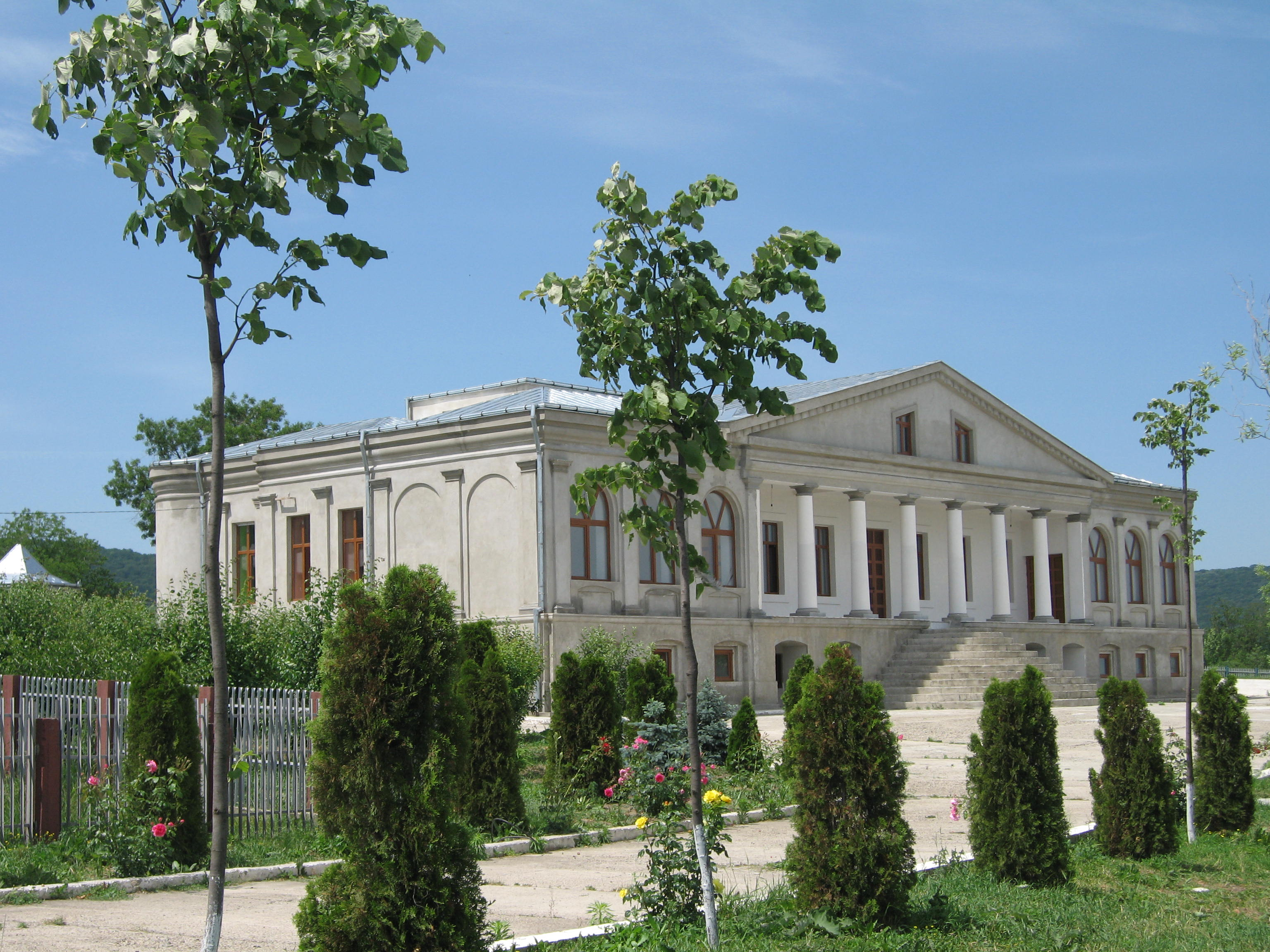
- Negruzzi Mansion in Voineṣti

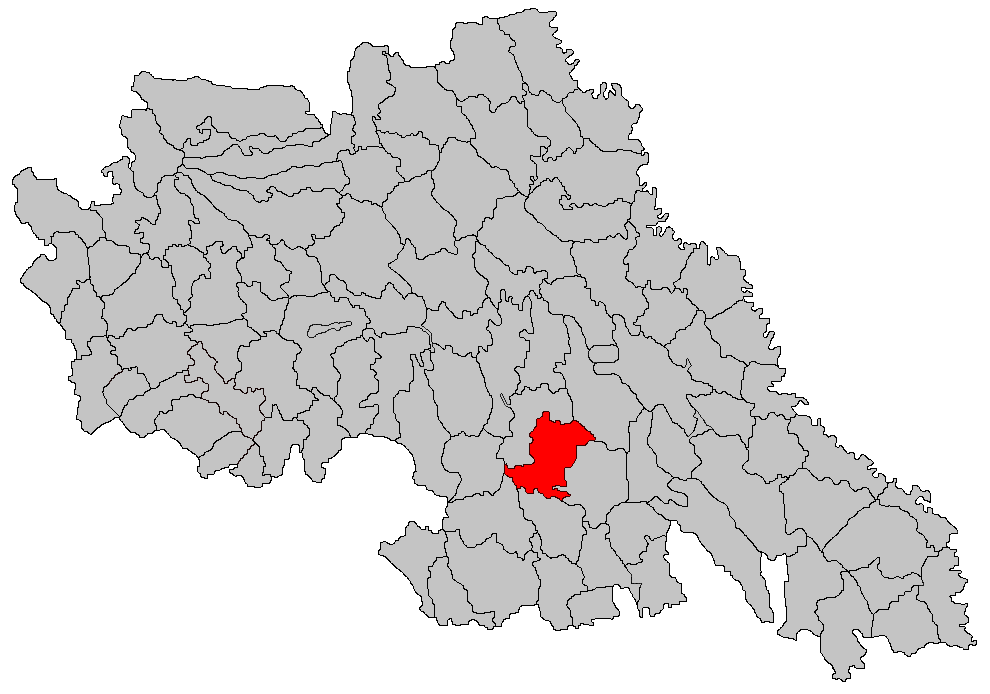
- Location in Iași County

- Location in Romania
- Coordinates: 47.073°N 27.432°E
- Country: Romania
- County: Iași

Government
  - Mayor (2020–2024): Gheorghe Dobreanu (PSD)
- Area: 63.67 km^{2} (24.58 sq mi)
- Elevation: 113 m (371 ft)
- Population (2021-12-01): 7,105
  - Density: 111.6/km^{2} (289.0/sq mi)
- Time zone: UTC+02:00 (EET)
  - Summer (DST): UTC+03:00 (EEST)
- Postal code: 707600
- Area code: +(40) 232
- Vehicle reg.: IS
- Website: www.primariavoinesti-iasi.ro

Voinești is a commune in Iași County, Western Moldavia, Romania. It is composed of five villages: Lungani, Schitu Stavnic, Slobozia, Vocotești, and Voinești.

== Natives ==
- Vasile Arvinte (1927–2011), linguist
