= Alexei Vinogradov =

Soviet military officer

A. I. Vinogradov
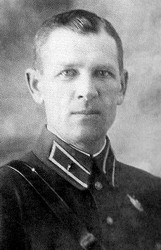
- Alexei Vinogradov
- Born: 12 February 1899; Zhiganovo, Ostashkovsky District, Tver Governorate, Russian Empire
- Died: 11 January 1940 (aged 40); Ukhta, Karelian ASSR, Soviet Union
- Military career
- Allegiance: Soviet Union
- Service years: 1919–1940
- Rank: Brigade Commander (kombrig)
- Commands: 44th Rifle Division of the Kiev Military District
- Conflicts: Russian Civil War; World War II; Invasion of Poland; Winter War; Battle of Raate Road
- Awards: Order of the Red Banner

Alexei Ivanovich Vinogradov (Russian: Алексе́й Ива́нович Виногра́дов; 12 February 1899 – 11 January 1940) was a Soviet kombrig and the commander of the 44th Rifle Division. His unit took part in the Soviet invasion of Poland and the Winter War against the Finns. The unit perished in the Battle of Raate Road and Vinogradov was executed by the Soviet military for the failure.

== Biography ==
=== Early life ===
Alexei Vinogradov was born to an ethnic Russian family in the village of Zhiganovo in Tver Governorate. He started his military career as a private in the Red Army on the Eastern Front of the Russian Civil War in March 1919. He graduated from the Soviet infantry course in Ukraine in 1922 and the highest course of chemistry in Tver in 1924.

Vinogradov served as a platoon leader and later as a company commander and regiment staff officer between 1922 and 1937 before advancing to the position of a regiment commander 1937–1938.

=== World War II ===
During the Soviet military purges of 1938–1939, Vinogradov was a part of the commander reserve. He was promoted to the rank of kombrig and was made the commander of the 44th Rifle Division by the Kiev Military District.

During the Battle of Suomussalmi in January 1940, the Soviet 163rd Division of the 9th Army had been trapped deep inside Finnish territory and the 44th Rifle Division led by Vinogradov was sent to break the encirclement. Early attacks by the 44th Division were repelled by the Finns and later attack plans were cancelled by Vinogradov.

The 44th Division found its supply line severed as well and with soldiers suffering from hunger, Vinogradov requested immediate support from the 9th Army headquarters on the evening of 3 January. After the battalion commander Pashutov told Vinogradov that his hungry men wouldn't be fit for combat without new supplies, Vinogradov ordered him to feed the troops, but this order could not be acted upon and a part of the 44th Division's troops were permanently left inside the encirclement in Haukila.

The radio contact of the 9th Army headquarters with the encircled troops was cut on 6 January and Vinogradov was allowed to act on his will as long as no equipment was left for the Finns to capture. Vinogradov ordered a retreat to the east by marching on the northern side of the Raate Road. Artillery formations of the 44th Division, however, had to retreat using the road which they found was cut off by Finnish troops. Chaos ensued, with heavy Soviet casualties and loss of equipment. According to a Soviet report, the 44th Division lost 4,674 out of 13,962 men, whereas Finnish sources estimate between 7,000 and 9,000 killed.

Stavka (military high command) ordered a report on the incident and the 9th Army war council blamed the decision to bring transport vehicles near the frontline, as this tied the 44th Division to defend their supply columns. The 9th Army war council pin-pointed the blame on the commander of the 146th Infantry Regiment, Pyotr V. Iyevlev and his staff, for the defeat. Stavka decided, however, that Alexei Vinogradov, his chief of staff Colonel Volkov and the chief of the political department Pakhomov were responsible and to be executed.

Alexei Vinogradov and the two staff members were executed by a firing squad in front of the surviving 44th Division members in Vazhenvaara on 11 January 1940. He was rehabilitated by a decision of the Leningrad Military District on 17 November 1990.
