= Moshchenoye =

Moshchenoye Мощеное
- Selo
- Location within Belgorod Oblast Location within Russia
- Coordinates: 50°41′N 36°07′E
- Country: Russia
- Region: Belgorod Oblast
- District: Yakovlevsky District
- Time zone: UTC+3:00

Moshchenoye (Russian: Мощеное) is a rural locality (a selo) and the administrative center of Moshchenskoye Rural Settlement, Yakovlevsky District, Belgorod Oblast, Russia. The population was 546 in 2010. There are ten streets.

== Geography ==
Moshchenoye is located 36 km southwest of Stroitel (the district's administrative centre) by road. Novaya Glinka is the nearest rural locality.
