= Kiantajärvi =

Lake in Suomussalmi, Finland

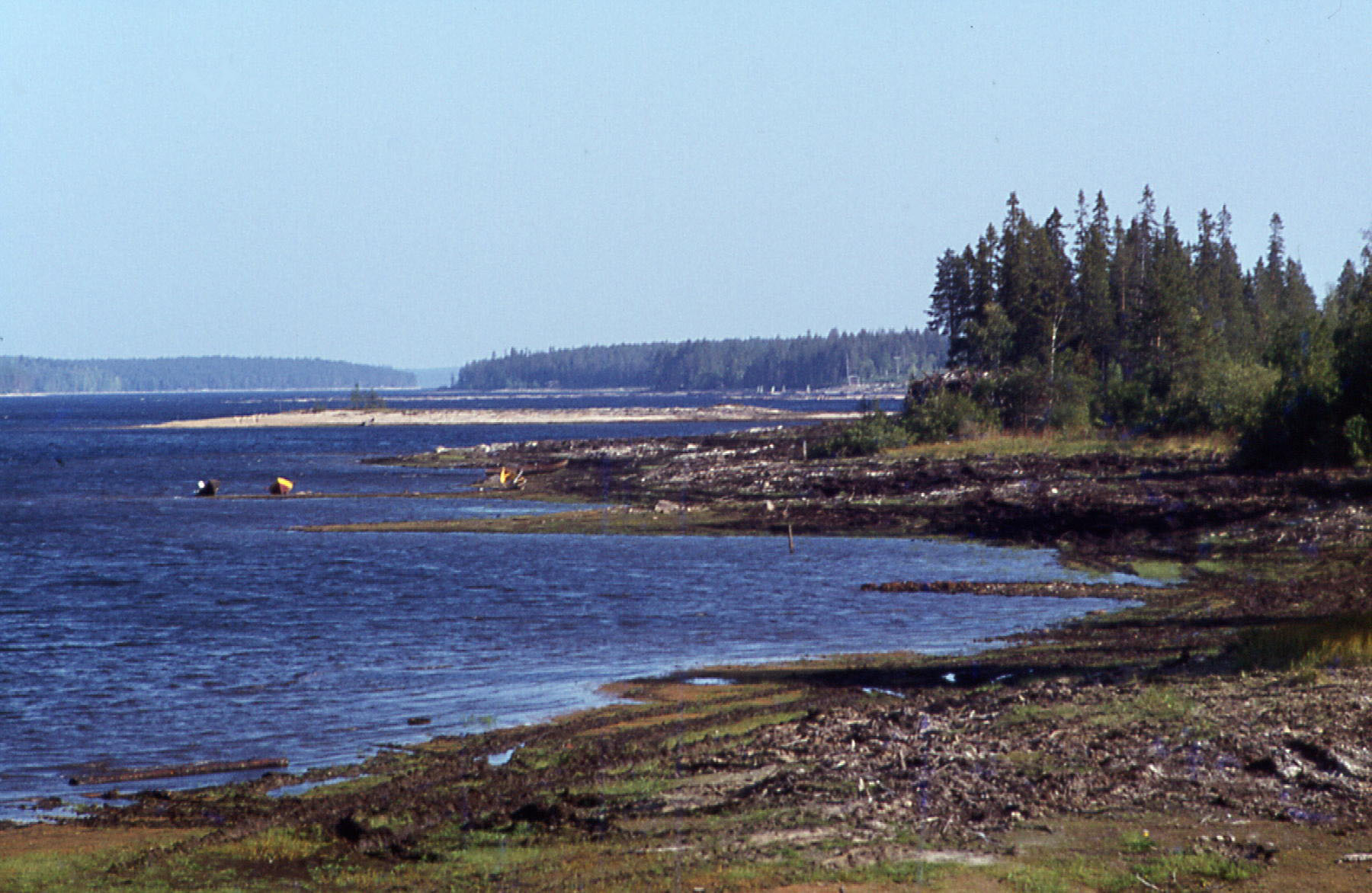

- Location within Finland
- Location: Suomussalmi, Kainuu
- Coordinates: 65°02′N 29°06′E
- Primary inflows: river Hossanjoki, river Pesiönjoki from the lake Pesiöjärvi
- Primary outflows: Emäjoki river, Aittokoski power station
- Catchment area: Oulujoki
- Basin countries: Finland Kainuu
- Max. length: 50 km (31 mi)
- Surface area: 187.933 km^{2} (72.561 sq mi)
- Average depth: 7.37 m (24.2 ft)
- Max. depth: 43 m (141 ft)
- Water volume: 1.385 km^{3} (1,123,000 acre⋅ft)
- Shore length^{1}: 527.719 km (327.909 mi)
- Surface elevation: 199.3 m (654 ft)
- Frozen: November–May
- Islands: 144 islands, biggest Salonsaari (2.71 km^{2})
- Settlements: Suomussalmi
- ^{1} Shore length is not a well-defined measure.

Kiantajärvi is a rather large lake in Finland, in the Oulujoki main catchment area. It is located in Suomussalmi municipality, in the region of Kainuu. It is the 24th biggest lake in Finland. The lake is narrow and 50 km long in north–south direction.

== History ==
Kiantajärvi lake played a significant role in the Battle of Suomussalmi during the Winter War in December 1939.

Kiantajärvi is also known for the author Ilmari Kianto, who had his home named Turjanlinna on the shore of the Niskaselkä open area. The author's grave is situated on Niettussaari island near his home.
