= Paavo Susitaival =

Finnish politician and military officer

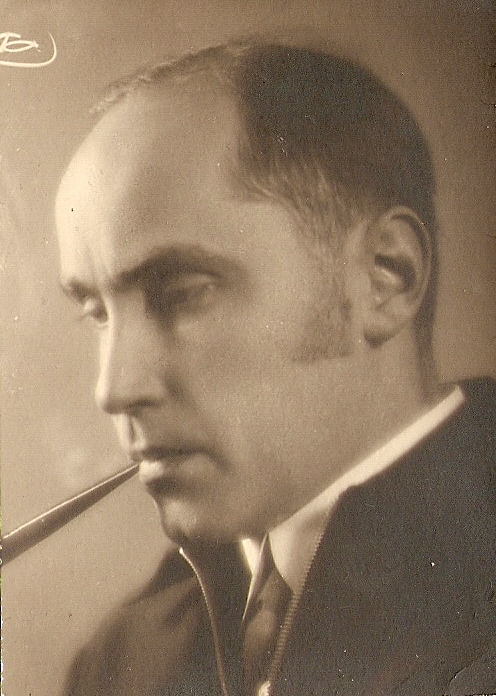

Member of the Parliament of Finland
- In office 1 September 1939 – 31 December 1940 (Note: Once Susitaival was officially released to serve in the armed forces, he was replaced in parliament by Eino Tuomivaara.)

Personal details
- Born: 9 February 1896 Helsinki, Finland
- Died: 27 December 1993 (aged 97) Lappeenranta, Finland
- Party: Patriotic People's Movement

Lieutenant Colonel Paavo Susitaival (9 February 1896 – 27 December 1993), born Paavo Sivén, was a Finnish author, soldier and politician. Paavo Sivén and his brother, Bobi Sivén were prominent figures in the Finnish interwar Nationalist movement. Paavo had acquired his reputation smuggling volunteers to Germany to enlist in the 27. Imperial Jaeger Battalion; Bobi gained his by being the last alderman of Porajärvi municipality before the ratification of the Treaty of Tartu who shot himself rather than acknowledge the transfer of Porajärvi and Repola to the Soviet Union.

== Early life ==
Paavo Sivén adopted the name Susitaival ("wolf's path" in English) during the First World War to throw off the Czar's secret service. Later, during the Finnish Civil War he attempted to enlist in the Finnish Army, only to realize that he – or rather, one of his pseudonyms – had already been appointed Captain in the Army, while he under his real name was listed as a draft-dodger. After the war he continued as a career soldier. He changed his name permanently to Susitaival in protest against the Svecoman sentiment in the Finnish Army, after attending an Army Cadet School church services where the Swedish-speaking cadets would not take communion with Finnish-speaking cadets.

== Finnish parliament ==
Susitaival participated in the Rebellion of Mäntsälä in a minor role, for which he served time in prison. Representing the Finnish fascist party IKL, Susitaival was elected as a member of the Finnish parliament in 1939. His career in the parliament was short lived, as at the beginning of the Winter War he chose to apply for active duty, one of only three Finnish MPs to do so.

== Winter War ==
During the Winter War, Susitaival served as a Lieutenant Colonel, commanding Osasto Susi in the Battle of Suomussalmi. He also held various command positions in the Continuation War. Despite his leadership skills and charisma, his abrasive, demanding character and a personal feud with Marshal Mannerheim, among other prominent officers, was the cause of him never advancing beyond that rank.

== Later life and death ==
After the war, Paavo Susitaival retired from the Army and lived as an author in Lappeenranta, where a street is named after him. In later life, his physical condition worsened but he never lost his mental acumen. In spite of being a heavy smoker (reputedly consuming at least one bag of pipe tobacco per day after the age of 14) and an avid coffee-drinker, he died at the age of 97. In his will, he requested that he should be buried with his officer's sword, in order that future archaeologists would know that his grave was that of a soldier.

He summed up his life thus: "Three wars, two rebellions, four prison stints. Unfortunately, once in parliament as well."

== Awards ==
- Cross of Freedom 2nd class with Oak Leaves (1941)
- Cross of Freedom 2nd class (1940)
- Cross of Freedom 3rd class (1919)
- Cross of Freedom 4th class with swords (1918)
- Knight Cross of the Order of White Rose of Finland
- Jäger Activist Medal
- Commemorative Medal of the War of Freedom (1918)
- Commemorative Medal of Venäjänsaari (1918)
- Commemorative Medal of Winter War (1940)
- Winter War Lapland Cross (1940)
- Commemorative Medal of Continuation War (1940)
- Commemorative Medal of the 11th Division
- Iron Cross 2nd class (1941)
- Prussian Merit Cross for War Aid (1918)
- Prussian Red Cross Medal 3rd class (1919)

== Sources ==
- L. J. Niinistö; "Paavo Susitaival 1896–1993. Aktivismi elämänasenteena", 1998.
