= 44th Rifle Division =

Soviet Red Army formation

44th Rifle Division 44th Mountain-Rifle Division
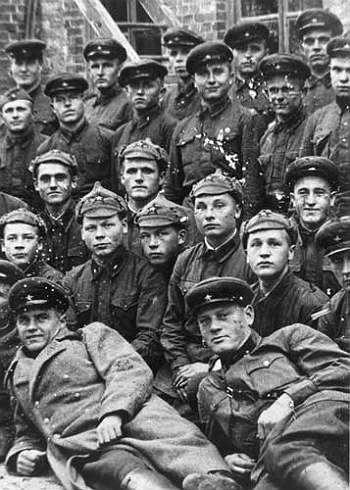
- Soldiers and officers of the 44th Kievan Rifle Division, an elite unit of the Ukrainian SSR
- Active: 1918–1957
- Country: Soviet Union
- Branch: Red Army (1918-1946); Soviet Army (1946-1957)
- Type: Infantry
- Size: Division
- Nickname: 44th Kievskaya
- Engagements: Ukrainian-Soviet War Winter War: Battle of Raate Road; World War II: Battle of Lypovec; Siege of Leningrad
- Decorations: Order of Red Banner (1928)
- Battle honours: Shchors Kievskaya (1920)

Commanders
- Notable commanders: Alexei Vinogradov

The 44th Kievskaya of the Red Banner Rifle Division of Nikolay Shchors, or 44th Kievskaya for short, was an elite military formation of the Soviet Union. Created during the beginnings of the Russian Civil War. It was destroyed during the Winter War, after being ordered to help the 163rd Rifle Division break a Finnish siege on the Raate road as part of the Special Rifle Corps 9th Army, together with the 54th Rifle Division. Afterwards it was levied and dissolved multiple times throughout the 40s and 50s until its final dissolution in 1959.

== Early history ==
=== Creation ===
The unit is also famous for being one of the first military formations out of which was formed the short-lived Ukrainian Soviet Army (November 30, 1918 – June 1, 1919). It was formed by the order no.6 of the Communist Party (Bolshevik) of Ukraine on September 22, 1918, as the 1st Insurgent Division along with the 2nd Insurgent Division. The 1st Insurgent Division was formed out of insurgent squads of Tarashcha and Novgorod-Sieversky uyezds. The chief of division (nachdiv) was appointed N.Krapivyansky and the chief of staff S.Petrikovsky (Petrenko).

Initial order of battle

- 1st Red Cossacks Regiment (Vitaly Primakov)
- 2nd Insurgent Regiment, later called Tarashcha (V.Balyas, later M.Baron, and then V.Bozhenko)
- 3rd Insurgent Regiment of Bogun, later called simply Bogun (Nikolay Shchors)
- 4th Insurgent Regiment (Ya.Kisel)

By the end of September, the Division grew to 6700 bayonets, 450 sabers, 14 [artillery] guns, and from 10 to 18 machine guns "Maxim", 5 to 6 Colt, 20 to 30 Lewis. Because of that, selected regiments were reorganized into brigades. However, the name for the units were nominal as the brigade's headquarters were never formed, and functions of kombrigs were performed by the regimental commanders (colonel).

- 1st Brigade of Red Cossacks (1st Regiment and 2nd Regiment) (Vitaly Primakov)
- 2nd Brigade (3rd Bogun Regiment and 2nd Tarashcha Regiment) (Nikolay Shchors)

Around that time at the divisional headquarters a security company was formed out of some 700 soldiers. That new unit was planned to be transformed into the 5th Regiment and used as a reserve. Also the 4th Insurgent Regiment was recommissioned as the 6th Insurgent Regiment (commander T.Chernyak) and along with the 1st Regiment of Red Cossacks was soon transferred to the 2nd Insurgent Division. In their places, were created the 3rd Insurgent Regiment, later called Novgorod-Sieversky (T.Chernyak) and the 4th Insurgent Nezhyn Regiment (P.Nesmeyan) transformed out the security company.

=== Ukrainian-Soviet War ===
During the preparations for an assault on Kharkiv most of the division, however, refused to obey orders except for the Red Cossacks and the 4th Insurgent Nezhyn Regiment. For that the divisional commander N.Krapivyansky was dismissed and court martialed. I Lokatosh was appointed the new chief of division and I. Panafidin the political commissar. The name of the division also changed to the Special Insurgent Division (order of Military Council of Kursk direction group of forces of November 21, 1918) as well as its formation consisting of now only two brigades:

- 1st brigade (P.Kovtun) (Novgorod-Sieversky Regiment - T.Chernyak and Nezhyn Company - P.Nesmeyan)
- 2nd brigade (N.Shchors) (Bogun and Tarashcha Regiments)

The 44th Rifle Division, part of the 12th Army, was formed from units of the 1st Ukrainian Soviet Army by a 16 June 1919 order. Reorganized as the 44th Border Rifle Division on 5 August when it absorbed the 3rd Border Division, it merged with the 1st Ukrainian Soviet Division to become the 44th Rifle Division on 16 August.

== Winter War (destruction at the Battle of Raate Road) ==
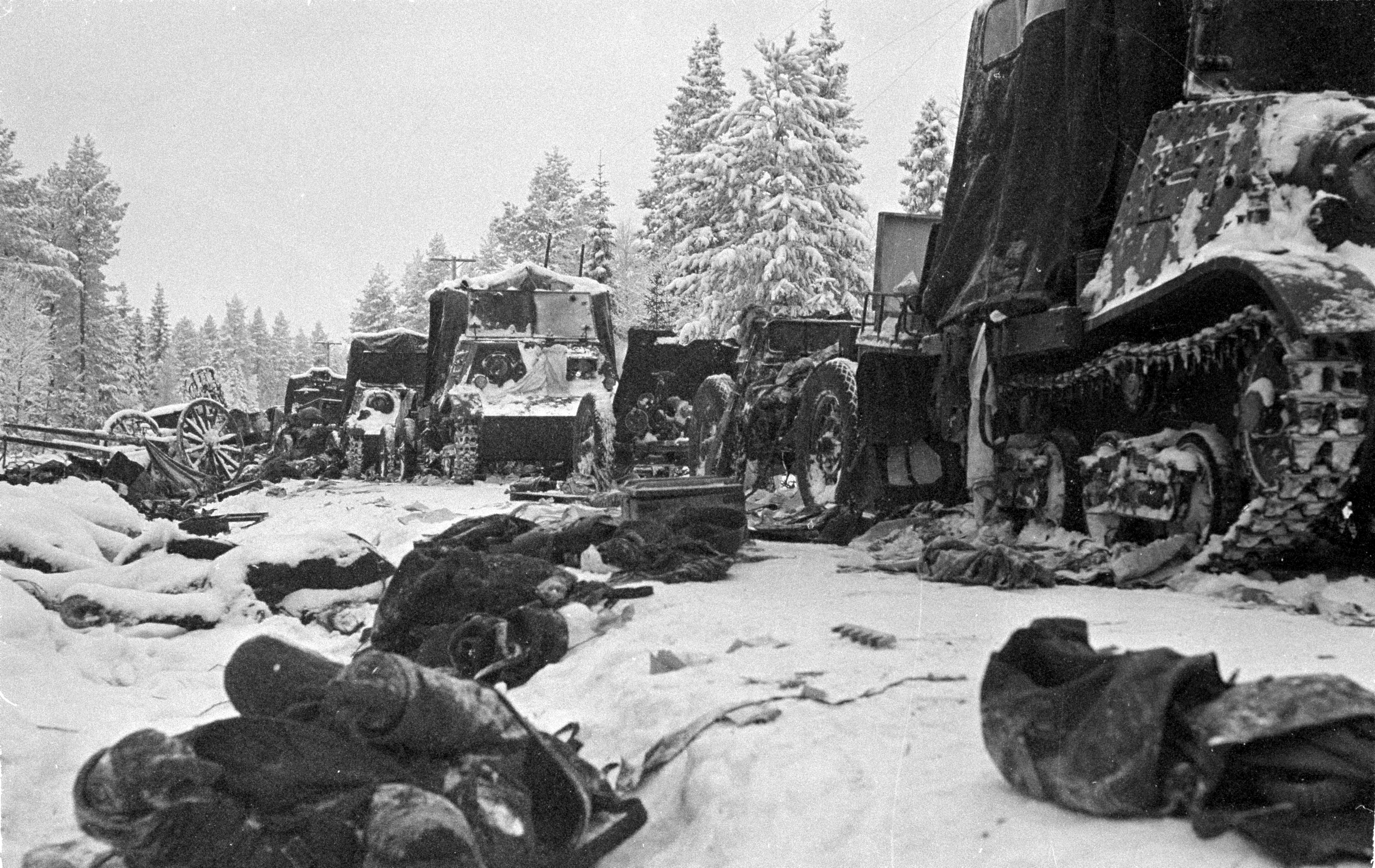
Soviet dead along the Raate Road, January 1940

The 44th Rifle Division participated in the Soviet invasion of Poland in autumn 1939. Later, during the Finno-Russian Winter War, the division was sent to the Finnish front as reinforcement for the Soviet 163rd Rifle Division which had attempted to advance into central Finland and become surrounded after capturing the town of Suomussalmi and was suffering heavy casualties. The 163rd Division, which was running short of food, was almost completely annihilated in combat with the Finnish 9th Infantry Division^{[fi]} before the 44th Rifle Division could reach its position. With no ski troops, the 44th Rifle Division was completely road-bound in the deep snow. The Finns, mounted on skis, carrying superior arms (primarily KP-31 submachine guns), and assisted by radio intelligence, were able to break up the route of march of the 44th Division on the Raate-Suomussalmi road, isolating and annihilating the disorganized Soviet troops. According to Robert Edwards, the division's commander, Alexei Vinogradov, managed to escape, but later, on the orders of Stalin's emissary, Lev Mekhlis, he was shot for incompetence following a sham trial. Of the 44th Division's 17,000 troops, 1,000 were captured as prisoners of war and 700 escaped back to their own lines. The rest died. Other records suggest that kombrig Vinogradov was sentenced in January 1940 to the highest degree of punishment (VMN) by the Military Tribunal of the 9th Army, along with his chief of staff Onufri Volkov. On January 11, Vinogradov was publicly executed in front of a formation of his troops.

== Later history ==
In March 1940, the division was again redeployed to Ukraine and in June was incorporated into the 49th Rifle Corps of the 5th Army of the Southern Front. It saw no combat during the Soviet seizure and annexation of Northern Bukovina and Bessarabia.

On April 24, 1941, according to the resolution of the Central Committee of the CPSU (b) and the Council of People's Commissars of the Soviet Union (SNK) of April 23, 1941 No. 1112-459ss, the 44th Rifle Division was reformed into a mountain rifle formation with the abandonment of the previous insignia.

It participated in the Great Patriotic War as the 44th Kiev Red Banner Mining Division named after Schors. It was part of 13th Rifle Corps, 12th Army, Kiev Special Military District in June 1941.

"Captured Soviet Generals" says that the division commander, Major General S.A. Tkachenko, was captured by the Germans. The division was immediately caught up in conflict and suffered heavy losses. By 21 July 1941 the division was already short of shtat (establishment or Table of Organization and Equipment) by over 4,000 soldiers, 199 cargo trucks, and over 3,000 rifles and carbines. Divisional morale fell despite some small victories. Ultimately the division was wiped out in combat in the Battle of Uman near the village of Podvyskoe in the Kirovograd and Uman region.

The division was recreated at Leningrad in October 1941. It fought in northern Russia and Kurland with the 54th Army of Volkhov Front in January 1944 and the 67th Army of the Leningrad Front in May 1945.

It was briefly reactivated after the war from 1955 at Uralsk in Uralsk Oblast, from the 270th Rifle Division. It was redesignated the 44th Motor Rifle Division on 4 June 1957. In January 1958 it became part of the Turkestan Military District with the dissolution of the South Ural Military District. The division disbanded on 1 March 1959. Its 118th and 126th Motor Rifle Regiments transferred to the 43rd Motor Rifle Division.

In July 1960 the number "44" was again adapted for an active formation with the formation of the 44th Training Airborne Division.

== Structure ==
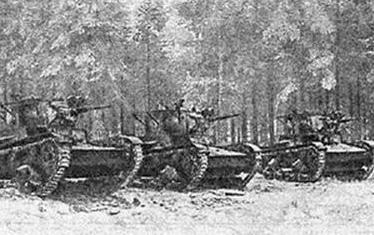
T-26 tanks of the 44th Rifle Division in Finland prior to an attack

On July 8, 1939:

- 25th Infantry Regiment
- 146th Infantry Regiment
- 305th Infantry Regiment;
- 122nd Artillery Regiment
- 179th Howitzer Artillery Regiment
- 312th Independent Tank Battalion
- 66th Separate Anti-Aircraft Machine Gun Company
- 56th Separate Anti-Tank Battalion
- 61st Separate Battalion
- 12th Separate Battalion
- 4th Separate Reconnaissance Battalion
- 42nd Separate Motor Battalion
- 5th Separate Decontamination Company
- 38th Artillery Battalion
- 113th Separate Repair Company
- 78th Medical Battalion;
- Mobile Field Hospital
- 156th Field Postal Station;

== List of commanders ==
- July 1919 - August 1919 - Ivan Naumovich Dubovoy
- August 1919 - Nikolai Shchors
- August 1919 - September 1919 - Ivan Naumovich Dubovoy
- September 1919 - October 1919 - Mironov
- October 1919 - Petr Volkov
- October 1919 - January 1922 - Ivan Naumovich Dubovoy
- 1930s - Dmitry Timofeyevich Kozlov
- 1930s - Yaroslav Shtrombakh
- January 1939 - January 1940 - Alexei Vinogradov (executed January 11, 1940 for the failure in the Battle of Raate Road)
- January 1940 - P.Furt
- January 1940 - September 1941 - Semyon Tkachenko

== Sources ==
- Neihorster, Leo, World War II Armed Forces, Orders of Battle and Organizations
- Edwards, Robert, The Winter War, Pegasus Books, New York, 2008 ISBN 978-1-933648-50-7
- Feskov, V.I.; Golikov, V.I.; Kalashnikov, K.A.; Slugin, S.A. (2013). Вооруженные силы СССР после Второй Мировой войны: от Красной Армии к Советской [The Armed Forces of the USSR after World War II: From the Red Army to the Soviet: Part 1 Land Forces] (in Russian). Tomsk: Scientific and Technical Literature Publishing. ISBN 9785895035306.
