= Piispajärvi =

Lake in Finland

- Location within Finland
- Location: Suomussalmi
- Coordinates: 65°17′N 29°00′E
- Primary outflows: Alassalmi strait to the lake Vellijärvi
- Catchment area: Oulujoki
- Basin countries: Finland
- Surface area: 12.876 km^{2} (4.971 sq mi)
- Average depth: 2.43 m (8 ft 0 in)
- Max. depth: 12.75 m (41.8 ft)
- Water volume: 0.0313 km^{3} (25,400 acre⋅ft)
- Shore length^{1}: 70.25 km (43.65 mi)
- Surface elevation: 247.8 m (813 ft)
- Settlements: Piispajärvi village
- ^{1} Shore length is not a well-defined measure.

Piispajärvi is a medium-sized lake in the Oulujoki main catchment area in Kainuu region, in Finland. There is also a village named Piispajärvi in the eastern shore of the lake. The Finnish National Road 5 cross the lake near the village.

== See also ==
- List of lakes in Finland
