= 147th Rifle Division =

147th Rifle Division (August 28, 1939 – December 27, 1941) 147th Rifle Division (January 28, 1942 - July 1946)
- Active: 1939–1946
- Country: Soviet Union
- Branch: Red Army
- Type: Infantry
- Size: Division
- Engagements: Soviet occupation of Bessarabia and Northern Bukovina; Operation Barbarossa; Battle of Kiev (1941); Battle of Stalingrad; Operation Iskra; Operation Polkovodets Rumyantsev; Battle of the Dnieper; Battle of Kiev (1943); Rovno–Lutsk offensive Lvov-Sandomierz Offensive; Vistula–Oder offensive Lower Silesian offensive Battle of Berlin; Battle of Halbe; Prague offensive
- Decorations: Order of Bogdan Khmelnitsky (2nd Formation)
- Battle honours: Stanislav (2nd Formation)

Commanders
- Notable commanders: Col. Konstantin Ivanovich Mironov; Col. Savva Kalistratovich Potekhin; Col. Ivan Vladimirovich Kovrigin; Maj. Gen. Nikolai Afanasevich Moskvin; Maj. Gen. Mikhail Petrovich Yakimov; Col. Ivan Stepanovich Gerasimov; Col. Grigorii Sergeevich Dudnik

The 147th Rifle Division was originally formed as an infantry division of the Red Army in August 1939 in the Kharkov Military District, based on the shtat (table of organization and equipment) of the following month. In June-July of 1940 it was part of 9th Army in the operation to occupy the Romanian territories of Bessarabia and northern Bukovina, after which it returned to eastern Ukraine. At the time of the German invasion in June 1941 it was in the same area, part of 7th Rifle Corps, but after an abortive move across the Dniepr River was incorporated into the Kiev Fortified Region as part of Southwestern Front. It would remain defending the Ukrainian capital into September, eventually as part of 37th Army, when it was deeply encircled and destroyed.

A new 147th began forming in January 1942 in the Moscow Military District, based on a 400-series division. After several months of equipping and training it was assigned to 7th Reserve Army, soon renamed 62nd Army, and railed south to the Caucasus steppe in July in the path of Army Group B's drive toward Stalingrad. As part of Stalingrad Front the Army took up positions on the west bank of the Don River, in what it usually called its Great Bend. In the second week of August it was surrounded with most of its Army in a bridgehead west of Kalach-na-Donu and lost nearly all its personnel and equipment in breaking out, but was not disbanded. The small cadre was moved to the Reserve of the Supreme High Command for rebuilding and moved north, joining the 2nd Shock Army of Volkhov Front in time to participate in the offensive that restored land communications with Leningrad. Near the end of this operation the division failed in an attack on a workers settlement near Sinyavino, resulting in the dismissal of its commander. It now returned to the Reserve of the Supreme High Command and was moved south to join 27th Army, first in Steppe Front and then Voronezh Front; it would remain under this command, and its successor 1st Ukrainian, for the duration of the war. After extensive fighting in the vicinity of Okhtyrka the 147th advanced to the Dniepr where it crossed as part of the abortive Bukryn operation in October. After reassignments to both 40th and 38th Armies it found itself west of Kyiv in 60th Army, then advanced toward Shepetivka in February 1944 under 1st Guards Army. It was under this command in July's offensive toward the Vistula and won a battle honor during the advance. In the fall the division was transferred again, now to 13th Army, where it would remain for the duration. During the 1945 winter offensive the 147th advanced through southern Poland and into lower Silesia, where all four of its regiments received decorations following the fighting for Sprottau. During the Berlin operation the division crossed the Neisse River and broke through the German defense lines, assisting in the encirclement and destruction of German forces in the area of Halbe, for which it was decorated with the Order of Bogdan Khmelnitsky. The war ended as the 147th was advancing on Prague, and by the end of the year it was back in Ukraine, where it was disbanded in July 1946.

== 1st Formation ==
The 147th began forming on August 28, 1939 at Lubny in the Kharkov Military District, based on the 104th Rifle Regiment of the 25th Chapayev Rifle Division. It was immediately assigned to the 55th Rifle Corps. The deputy commander of the 25th, Col. Akseli Moiseevich Anttila took command the day it formed. With the outbreak of war between Germany and Poland on September 1 the division's training regiment was accelerated and a month later it was considered combat-ready. On November 9 it was placed on a peacetime footing and moved to the 14th Rifle Corps. Colonel Antilla was moved to a command in the Finnish People's Army prior to the outbreak of the Winter War, and Col. Konstantin Ivanovich Mironov took command on November 29. This officer had previously led the 42nd Rifle Division.

On May 15, 1940, in accordance with the operational plan of Lt. Gen. N. F. Vatutin, the 147th was redeployed to Kirovograd in the Odessa Military District. When the occupation of Bessarabia began on June 28 it was part of Southern Front's 9th Army. After this operation ended in early July the division was moved again, now to Kryvyi Rih. At the outbreak of the war with Germany it was part of the 7th Rifle Corps, which was soon moved to Southwestern Front, and its order of battle was as follows:

- 551st Rifle Regiment
- 600th Rifle Regiment
- 640th Rifle Regiment
- 379th Artillery Regiment
- 278th Howitzer Artillery Regiment (until September 10, 1941)
- 231st Antitank Battalion
- 339th Antiaircraft Battalion
- 170th Reconnaissance Battalion
- 281st Sapper Battalion
- 193rd Signal Battalion
- 151st Medical/Sanitation Battalion
- 143rd Chemical Defense (Anti-gas) Platoon
- 102nd Motor Transport Battalion
- 146th Field Bakery
- 170th Field Postal Station
- 350th Field Office of the State Bank

By July 8 the division was arriving at Bila Tserkva and Berdychiv with the 206th Rifle Division under orders to take up positions in the old Stalin Line near Shepetivka. These positions had already been overrun or bypassed, so the two divisions fell back. The 147th was soon incorporated into the Kiev Fortified Region.

=== Defense of Kyiv ===
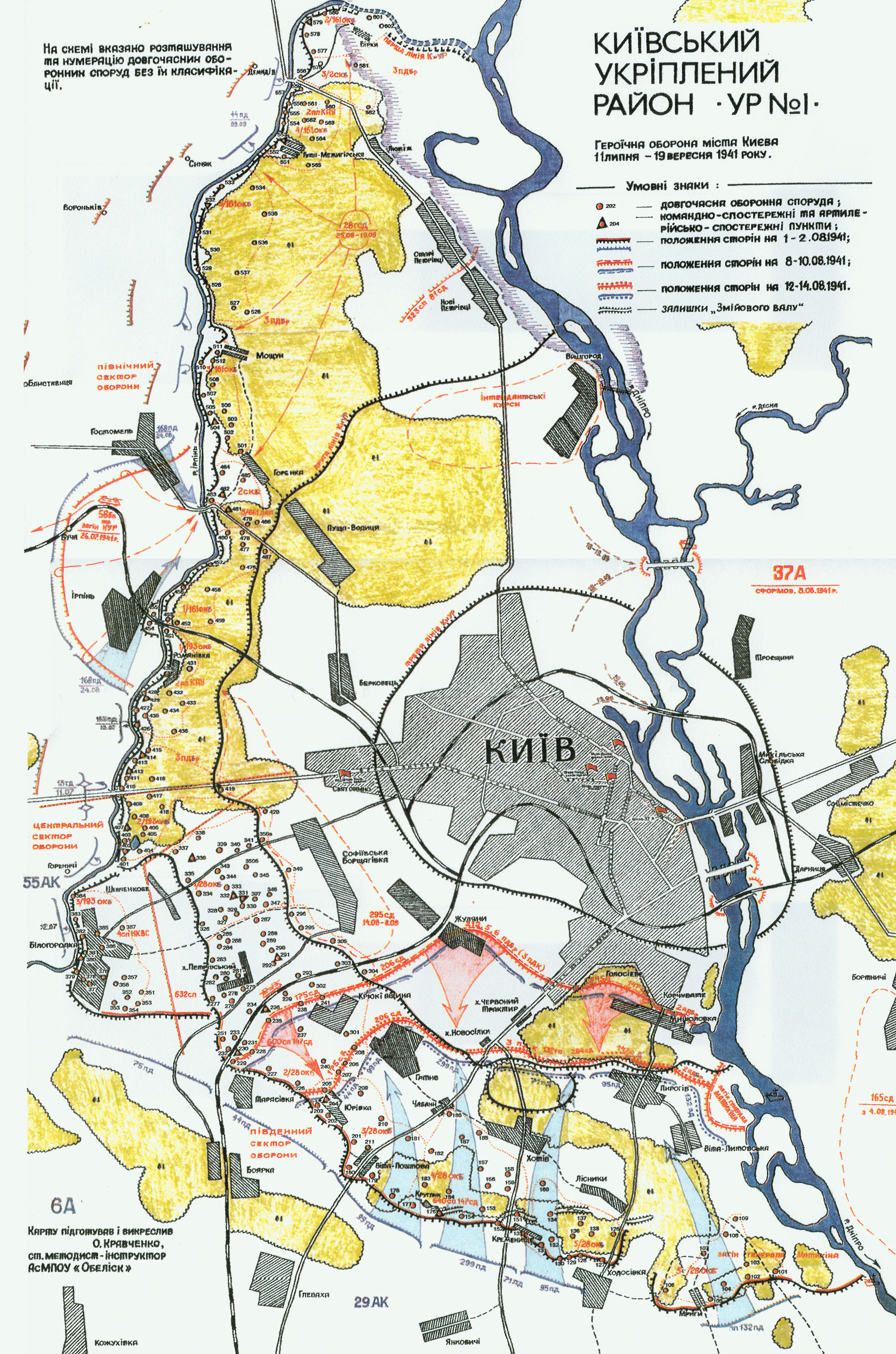
Kiev Fortified Region. Note positions of the 600th and 640th Regiments in the south and southwest.

The 13th and 14th Panzer Divisions reached the Irpin River west of Kyiv on July 11 after breaking through Southwestern Front near Zhytomyr. The German command was divided on plans to directly attack Kyiv to seize its crossings over the Dniepr, but by July 13 German reconnaissance made it clear that Soviet fortifications and troop concentrations ruled out any possibility of taking the city by surprise. Kyiv would remain in Soviet hands for more than two further months. As of August 1 the 147th was still under direct command of the Front, which was led by Col. Gen. M. P. Kirponos. On the same date Colonel Myronov officially left his command, having been encircled near Novyi Myropil with the 551st Rifle Regiment. He was able to escape and took command of the 113th Rifle Division in October, but would be killed while withdrawing from another encirclement on the Moscow front in April 1942. He was replaced in the 147th by Col. Savva Kalistratovich Potekhin, who had been serving as deputy commander of the 58th Mountain Rifle Division. The division was officially incorporated into 37th Army on August 8; this Army was tasked with continuing the defense of Kyiv.

During late July and into early August the XXIX Army Corps of German 6th Army made numerous attempts to capture Kyiv, but all of these were foiled. Meanwhile, the 2nd Panzer Group and 2nd Army of Army Group Center began their drives southward. By September 10 the remnants of 5th and 37th Armies were grouped north of Kozelets but on September 16 the 2nd Panzer linked up with the 1st Panzer Group of Army Group South well to the east and the Army was deeply encircled. The 278th Howitzer Regiment had already been written off due to encirclement on September 10, and now what was left of the division struggled to escape. Colonel Potekhin broke clear to friendly lines with some of his men, mostly as individuals and in small groups. He officially remained in command until December 27, when the 147th was deleted from the Red Army's order of battle in common with many other units destroyed at Kyiv. He was then given command of the 30th Rifle Division, which he held for about six months before attending the Voroshilov Academy, specializing in tank and mechanized forces. He would be promoted to major general of tank forces on March 11, 1944, but was killed in action by an air attack on August 22 while in deputy command of the 4th Guards Mechanized Corps.

== 2nd Formation ==
The 426th Rifle Division began forming at Shumerlya in the Moscow Military District in December 1941. On January 28, 1942, it was redesignated as the new 147th Rifle Division. Its personnel were predominantly of Chuvash, Tatar, and Udmurt nationalities. Its order of battle was similar to that of the 1st formation:

- 15th Rifle Regiment
- 600th Rifle Regiment
- 640th Rifle Regiment
- 379th Artillery Regiment
- 231st Antitank Battalion
- 170th Reconnaissance Company
- 281st Sapper Battalion
- 601st Signal Battalion (later 193rd Signal Battalion, 224th Signal Company)
- 151st Medical/Sanitation Battalion
- 509th Chemical Defense (Anti-gas) Company (later 165th)
- 70th Motor Transport Company
- 525th Field Bakery
- 890th Divisional Veterinary Hospital (later 147th)
- 21187th Field Postal Station (later 1719th, 2111th)
- 1772nd Field Office of the State Bank (later 1081st)

Col. Ivan Vladimirovich Kovrigin, who had led the 426th, remained in command. In April the division was moved to Kovrov, where it completed its equipping and continued training. It was briefly part of the active army from May 12-30 as it moved south to Lyapichev, where it was assigned to the 7th Reserve Army.

== Battle of the Don Bend ==
On July 10 7th Reserve was redesignated as 62nd Army, under command of Maj. Gen. V. Ya. Kolpakchi, and two days later the 147th again joined the active army. On July 16 Colonel Kovrigin left the division, being replaced by Maj. Gen. Aleksandr Alekseevich Volkhin. This officer had previously led the 145th Rifle Division and the 16th Reserve Rifle Brigade. The Army consisted of six rifle divisions (196th, 192nd, 147th, 181st, 184th, and 33rd Guards). In orders from the STAVKA on July 12 it was stated, in part:

4. The mission of the Stalingrad Front is to occupy the Stalingrad line west of the Don River firmly, with 62nd and 64th Armies... and under no circumstances permit an enemy penetration east of this line toward Stalingrad.

This order set the stage for the battle in the Great Bend of the Don.

German 6th Army was ordered to continue its eastward advance as soon as possible after July 17, but this was delayed by heavy rains; it was not until the 20th that LI Army Corps' lead divisions were able to engage and defeat the forward elements of 62nd Army on the Tsutskan River. By late on the next day five of the Army's divisions were deployed uniformly south to north across the Great Bend of the Don from Surovikino on the Chir River to Kletskaya on the Don. The 147th was responsible for a 15km-wide sector north of Surovikino left of the Army's center; its personnel strength was roughly 12,000, as compared to the shtat strength of 12,807 men. On July 22 the XIV Panzer Corps and VIII Army Corps caught up and by the evening Kolpakchi reported that his divisions were engaging German tanks and infantry all along the line. The 3rd and 60th Motorized and 16th Panzer Divisions advanced rapidly the next day, tearing through 62nd Army's forward security belt and advancing 24-40km, about halfway to the crossing points over the Don at Trekhostrovskaya and Kalach-na-Donu. By this time the 6th Army commander, Gen. F. Paulus, was planning to encircle 62nd Army west of the Don with his XIV Panzer and VIII Corps as a preliminary to an advance on Stalingrad.

Late on July 23, Kolpakchi reported that his right wing was fighting a "fierce defensive battle with enemy tanks (150-200) and infantry, supported by aircraft." The 147th was said to be contesting the advance of German motorcycle units of the 297th Infantry Division along the Chir; later he reported that his 192nd was falling back under heavy pressure but the 40th Tank Brigade was responding with a successful counterattack. By the end of the next day the situation had worsened considerably. Kolpakchi radioed that his 192nd and 184th Divisions had withdrawn to the northeast under the impact of from up to 100 German tanks and were defending a large bridgehead south of the Don River east of Kletskaya. On an ominous note he stated that while the 147th and 181st seemed to be standing strong in the center, and the 13th Tank Corps was engaging the German armor, his headquarters had lost communications with most of his forces after nightfall. In fact, by this time the XIV Panzer Corps and the supporting 113th Infantry Division had loosely encircled a third of 62nd Army on the high ground in the Mayorovsky region, although this did not include the 147th.

Through July 25-26 the two German pincers fought hard to complete their encirclement against sharply increasing Soviet attacks. VIII Corps' 113th and 100th Jäger Divisions, supported by most of 16th Panzer's tanks, had to simultaneously contain two Soviet bridgeheads south of the Don, defeat and destroy the encircled grouping, and fend off attempts to relieve the pocket. The overall position of 6th Army became more difficult as the new 1st and 4th Tank Armies entered the fray. On July 27 the 147th and 181st were reported as still defending their previous positions, but these were becoming less and less tenable. The encircled portion of the Army south of Kletskaya, called Group Zhuravlev, broke out on July 31 at the cost of heavy casualties.

=== The Kalach Bridgehead ===
On August 7, 6th Army began its advance on Kalach in order to take that crossing point over the Don. As the southern pincer of this new maneuver the 44th and 295th Infantry Divisions of LI Corps were to smash the defenses of 62nd Army along the Chir. The Army had taken in the remaining forces of the disbanded 1st Tank Army and was attempting to hold its bridgehead west of Kalach with eight rifle divisions, including the 147th, plus two tank corps, assorted remnants of other tank units, and two student rifle regiments. The divisions of 62nd Army held along the western part of the bridgehead; altogether some 100,000 troops were on the defense backed by something under 150 tanks. At the end of the day the Red Army General Staff's daily summary painted a disastrous picture of the overall situation, but the 147th was reported as "having relieved the left-wing units of 181st RD, was defending along the line Hill 146.5–Verkhne Osinovka–Surovikino."

As August 8 began the 16th and 24th Panzer Divisions pivoted 90 degrees and began to press the eastern face of the bridgehead toward the west. 62nd Army continued to hold two bridges over the Don, which here is some 200m wide between steep banks. As the panzers pressed on both caught fire, with one eventually blowing up. The bridgehead forces were now effectively surrounded. A summary from the Army headquarters noted that the current location of the division, as well as that of the 33rd Guards, was unknown. It required three more days of fighting to completely eliminate the Kalach pocket. On August 9 the 147th was located in a Southern Group with the 229th Rifle Division in the vicinity of Bolshaya Osinovka, with orders to withdraw to a railroad bridge at Logovskii, some 28km south of Kalach. Two days later the Army reported that all contact had been lost with the Southern Group, as well as 33rd Guards and 181st Divisions. On August 12, 6th Army announced the completion of the battle, along with the elimination of eight rifle divisions; Soviet documents indicate that roughly half of the encircled troops managed to escape east across the Don.

Of the some 9,570 personnel of the 147th that had been encircled, only 171 are known to have reached friendly lines by August 20. Among them was General Volkhin, along with some of his command cadre, documents and divisional banner. For this reason the division was not disbanded, but Volkhin himself was arrested in December, tried by a tribunal, and sentenced to death for having "lost control of his division", although this sentence was reduced to 10 years "imprisonment" to be served at the front, as well as reduction in rank to major. He had already been removed from command of the remnants of the 147th on August 17, eventually being replaced on September 21 by Maj. Gen. Nikolai Afanasevich Moskvin. Volkhin served well as deputy commander and later commander of the 251st Rifle Division's 927th Rifle Regiment and had his sentence annulled in March 1943. On August 12 he took command of the division, which he held until August 1944, having his major general rank restored during that time, and ended the war leading the 54th Rifle Corps. Moskvin was primarily a staff officer, having served as chief of staff of both 7th Reserve and 62nd Army. The division had been removed first to the Stalingrad Front reserves on August 30, then to the Reserve of the Supreme High Command at Volsk in the Volga Military District for a complete rebuilding.

== Operation Iskra ==
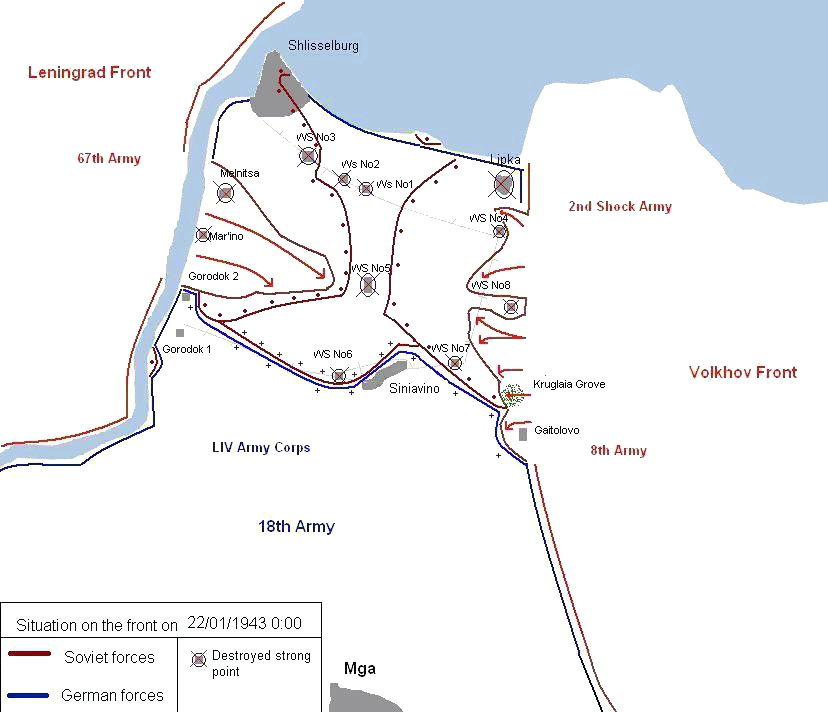
Operation Iskra. Note location of W.S. No. 6 west of Sinyavino.

In late November the commander of Leningrad Front, Lt. Gen. L. A. Govorov, and the commander of Volkhov Front, Army Gen. K. A. Meretskov, began planning a joint offensive to break the blockade of Leningrad and restore communications with the city by land. The exact timing would depend on the weather, as a strong ice cover over the Neva River would be required for the movement of Govorov's forces, especially tanks and heavy artillery. The plan called for simultaneous attacks by both Fronts with shock groups of seven or eight rifle divisions each, with more in reserve, supported by significant numbers of tanks, artillery, and engineers. The prospective time frame was mid-January, 1943. The STAVKA was requested to provide additional rifle divisions for the effort. The plan was approved on December 2 with only minor changes. The code name Iskra ("Spark") was assigned; Volkhov Front would be led by 2nd Shock Army and Leningrad Front by 67th Army. As part of requested reinforcements Meretskov received the reconstructed 147th along with four other rifle divisions. The division re-entered the active army on December 10 as part of 2nd Shock, which was commanded by Lt. Gen. V. Z. Romanovskii.

The offensive began on January 12 with a 140-minute artillery preparation on the 2nd Shock Army's front. All regimental and divisional artillery was mounted on skis or sleighs to improve mobility. The 147th was in the Army's second echelon. By the end of January 13 the Army had penetrated German defenses in two sectors along the 10km front between Lipka and Gaitolovo, one of which was 3km deep. As the advance slowed to a crawl much of the second echelon was committed over the next three days. By January 17 the command of Army Group North understood the perilous situation its forces faced as the two Soviet Fronts were about to link up, as they did at 0930 hours on January 18, just east of Workers Settlement No. 1. At this point the joint force was ordered to wheel southward to capture Sinyavino and the Gorodok settlements.

General Moskvin received orders from Romanovskii on January 19 to commit his entire division to attack and hold Workers Settlement No. 6, just west of Sinyavino, but this proved unsuccessful, although it later fell to other forces. On January 23 Moskvin was placed before the Front's military tribunal for this failure. He was accused of "criminal inaction", failure to designate boundaries between his subordinates, failure to coordinate artillery and other supporting arms, inadequate communications, and absence from his command post. As a consequence his units became intermixed and fell into panic, which he failed to quell. The following day he was relieved of his command and received a sentence similar to that of General Volkhin: 10 years "imprisonment" to be served at the front, but no reduction in rank. He served for six months as commander of the 641st Rifle Regiment of the 165th Rifle Division until his sentence was annulled. In 1944 he would return to chief of staff duties, first in the Baltic Military District and later Odessa Military District into peacetime. Maj. Gen. Mikhail Petrovich Yakimov had taken command of the 147th on January 25. This officer, who had been arrested and held for nearly two years during the Great Purge, had previously led the 364th Rifle Division. By January 31 the victorious forces were exhausted and the offensive was halted.

=== Move to the south ===
With the siege broken, in February 2nd Shock came under command of Leningrad Front. In March the division was sent to the Volkhov Front reserves, and on April 15 it returned to the Reserve of the Supreme High Command and began moving south by rail. By the start of May it had been assigned to 27th Army, which in June became part of the Steppe Military District. On July 9 the 147th rejoined the active army as Steppe Military District became Steppe Front during the Battle of Kursk.

== Into Ukraine ==
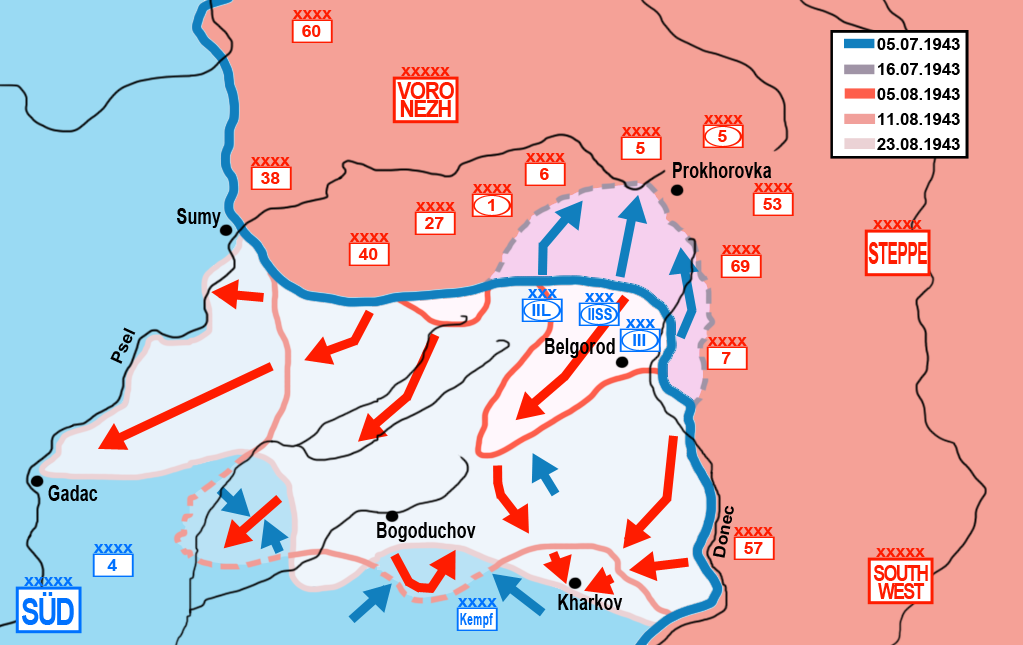
Operation Polkovodets Rumyantsev. Note initial position of 27th Army.

The battle had begun on July 5. 27th Army was deployed along a line from Rossoshnoye to Nikolskoye and consisted of six rifle divisions (71st, 147th, 155th, 163rd, 166th and 241st) plus the 93rd Tank Brigade.

27th Army saw no significant action during the German offensive, and by the beginning of August it had been transferred to Voronezh Front, which was still holding the southern half of the salient. In preparation for the counteroffensive, which began on August 3, the Army, which had been reinforced with additional armor and artillery assets, was concentrated behind the 40th Army's center in the Marino–Krasnaya Yaruga–Borisopole area. On the night of the operation's third day the Army was to deploy along the 11km-wide front from Kresanov to Soldatskoye while its main forces concentrated in the center to break through the German defense along the 6km sector Kasilovo–Novo-Berezovka. The Army was organized in two echelons, with four rifle divisions, a tank brigade, a Guards heavy tank regiment, and other reinforcements in the first echelon. The shock group consisted of the 241st and 163rd Divisions in first echelon, two second echelon divisions (155th and 71st), two tank corps, and the greater part of the reinforcements.

=== Operation Polkovodets Rumyantsev ===
The Front commander, Army Gen. N. F. Vatutin, ordered 27th Army on August 4 to organize a powerful reconnaissance-in-force along its entire front and prepare for attacking with its main forces. Along a number of sectors this reconnaissance penetrated up to 2-3km into the German defense. Later that day Marshal G. K. Zhukov issued instructions for the STAVKA that included:

1. For the purpose of widening the breach toward the west, on the morning of 5 August the 27th and 40th armies are to begin their offensive in the general direction of Graivoron.

On the morning of August 5 the shock groups of the two Armies attacked; due to the success of 27th Army's reconnaissance in disrupting the German defense system it limited itself to a powerful artillery onslaught of only 15 minutes. Having crushed the resistance of the 57th Infantry Division both Armies broke through the German front along a 26km-wide sector and by the close of the day had advanced in fighting 8-20km and reached the line Starosele–Kasilovo–Ivanovskaya Lisitsa–Nikitskoe. During the day the 11th Panzer Division had made repeated counterattacks with no success and at considerable cost in casualties.

The orders for August 6 directed 27th Army, along with the 4th Guards Tank Corps, to attack southwest towards Okhtyrka and reach the front Opposhnya–Bolshaya Rublevka–Kachalovka; it was subsequently planned to attack along both banks of the Vorskla River in the general direction of Poltava, while part of the Army's forces would assist the 6th Guards Army in destroying the German Tomarovka–Borisovka group of forces. On August 7 units of Panzergrenadier Division Großdeutschland, along with the 51st Heavy Tank Battalion (Tiger Is), arrived from the Karachev area and took part in fighting against 27th Army in the Bolshaya Pisarevka area. Following the elimination of the German forces in the Borisovka the Army continued to attack to the southwest along the Vorskla, liberating Bolshaya Pisarevka, an important paved road junction.

==== Fighting for Okhtyrka ====
During August 8-11 the 27th Army developed the offensive toward Okhtyrka. Continuing on the morning of August 8 to pursue units of the 323rd and remnants of the 255th Infantry Divisions along both banks of the Vorskla, and throwing back elements of Großdeutschland, by the close of the next day the Army's units had reached a line from Kyrykivka to the northern and eastern outskirts of Staraya Ryabina to Kupevakha. On August 10 it outflanked the Staraya Ryabina and Yablochnoye strongpoints from the northwest and south, defeated their garrisons and opened a path for the subsequent development of the offensive on Okhtyrka and Kotelva. The following day the 4th Guards Tanks, which was operating with the Army, broke into the eastern outskirts of Okhtyrka, while the 5th Guards Tank Corps broke into Kotelva and completely captured it. By this time the Army's divisions had reached the line Petrovskii–Vysokoe–Parkhomivka–Krasnokutsk, having covered more than 50km in four days.

27th Army was now tasked with reaching the line from Shilovka to Oposhnya to Artemovka and from August 12-17 was engaged in stubborn fighting along the line of the Vorskla. On the first day the Army's right flank formations continued to be involved in street fighting for Okhtyrka while its left wing reached the river's east bank along the sector Khukhrya–Kotelna–Kolontaev. On August 14 the Army continued to wage fierce battles in the Okhtyrka area, beating back German counterattacks. During the afternoon Vatutin gave the Army its mission for the following day: to destroy the German's Okhtyrka group of forces, capture a bridgehead along the western bank of the Vorskla, and reach a line 5km west of Okhtyrka. During the second half of August 15, due to the difficult situation along the front of 6th Guards Army, which was being forced to fall back in the face of a German counterattack, the Army was ordered to secure its left flank along the Merla River with the 241st and the 5th Guards Tanks. On August 16-17 German resistance along the Army's front increased sharply. With the support of significant air groups the Army's units were repeatedly counterattacked and a number of villages changed hands several times. On the second day the Army, which was dispersed along a 170km-wide front, was not able to advance along a single sector and control of Okhtyrka remained disputed.

At this point the German command, which had previously been defeated in its efforts to recapture Bohodukhiv by 6th Guards Army, began regrouping to attempt to reach the objective via Okhtyrka. To this end it concentrated Großdeutschland, the 7th and part of the 19th Panzer Division, the 10th Panzergrenadier Division, two heavy tank battalions, and four artillery regiments near and to the west of the town. As a result, it managed to achieve a significant superiority of force by mid-month along the front from Okhtyrka to Oposhnya to Krasnokutsk. On August 18 this grouping began an attack along the Okhtyrka axis against 27th Army's right flank. At 0830 hours, following a powerful artillery preparation and massed air attacks against the 155th and 166th Divisions the German grouping committed up to 200 tanks plus motorized infantry along the Pologii–Moshenki sector with continuing air support. the front of the 166th was pierced and by the end of the day the defense had been penetrated to a depth of 24km, creating a narrow pocket up to 7km in depth. During the morning the 4th Guards Army's 7th and 8th Guards Rifle Divisions had entered the battle against the breakthrough units, while the 166th's artillery claimed more than 30 panzers out of action. On the same day the 3rd SS Panzer Division Totenkopf attacked from the Kovalevka–Konstantinovka area in the direction of Kolontaev and Lyubovka but was beaten off by the 241st Division and units of the 5th Guards Tanks.

With the German arrival in the Kaplunovka area the situation along 27th Army's left flank quickly became more difficult as the 71st and 241st Divisions, plus the 4th and 5th Guards Tanks, faced the danger of encirclement. Stalin personally instructed Zhukov, who was at Vatutin's headquarters, as to the necessity of eliminating the German Okhtyrka grouping as quickly as possible and also to adopt emergency measures to ward off the possible isolation the Army's left flank formations. At 1650 hours Vatutin issued orders to his armies to restore the situation in the Okhtyrka area through joint attacks. On the basis of Stalin's instructions the 71st was ordered to withdraw its main forces from the west bank of the Vorskla during the night of August 18/19. The heavy fighting against the German breakthrough continued through August 19, as the German efforts to deepen the thrust through repeated attacks to the east largely failed. The next day, having failed to reach Bohodukhiv, the German command suspended its offensive along this axis and dispatched it main forces to eliminate the Soviet salient that had formed in to Kotelva area, but this fared no better. By day's end the 147th, along with the 3rd and 6th Tank Corps and 7th and 8th Guards, were holding Verbovyi, Vysokoe, Veselyi Gai, Kudryavyi, Komsomolets Sovkhoz, and Zaporozhets after heavy fighting, which deprived the German forces of all likely strongpoints to cover the left flank of their Okhtyrka grouping from the north. In three days of fighting, August 18-20, the 27th Army claimed 180 tanks, 50 guns, and four batteries of Nebelwerfers destroyed, plus two regiments of motorized infantry nearly completely destroyed and 30 planes shot down by its antiaircraft guns.

On the morning of August 21 the 27th Army received orders to attack toward Okhtyrka to complete the defeat of the German grouping in conjunction with 47th Army, but 6th Guards Army was to remain holding its present positions. The town was finally liberated on August 24, one day after Steppe Front recaptured Kharkiv for the final time.

=== Battles on the Dniepr ===
As of September 20, as it closed on the Dniepr River, the division had 3,631 personnel on strength, armed with 61 82mm and 14 120mm mortars, 11 76mm regimental and 15 76mm divisional guns, plus eight 122mm howitzers, making it the weakest of 27th Army's four remaining rifle divisions in manpower, but strongest in total artillery and mortars. By September 25 the Army had concentrated in the Pereiaslav-Khmelnytskyi area and two days later Vatutin made the decision to commit it into the fighting for a bridgehead in the Bukryn area:

The commander of the 27th Army is to immediately begin crossing over the Dnepr River along the 3rd Guards Tank Army's sector and that of the left flank of the 40th Army. The crossing of the troops is to be completed by the morning of 29.9.43. Following the crossing, the army is to advance immediately to the line excluding Yanivka-Shankra, where it is to arrive no later than 30.9.43 and relieve here the units of the 40th Army.

The 27th Army's forces crossed slowly, and only its infantry, without artillery. The 147th Division got across on September 28 near Hryhorivka, followed the next day by part of the forces of the 155th and 100th Rifle Divisions. Due to uninterrupted counterattacks these forces were immediately committed into the fighting. By the close of September 29 the Bukryn bridgehead was roughly 11km across and 6km deep.

==== Bukryn Bridgehead ====
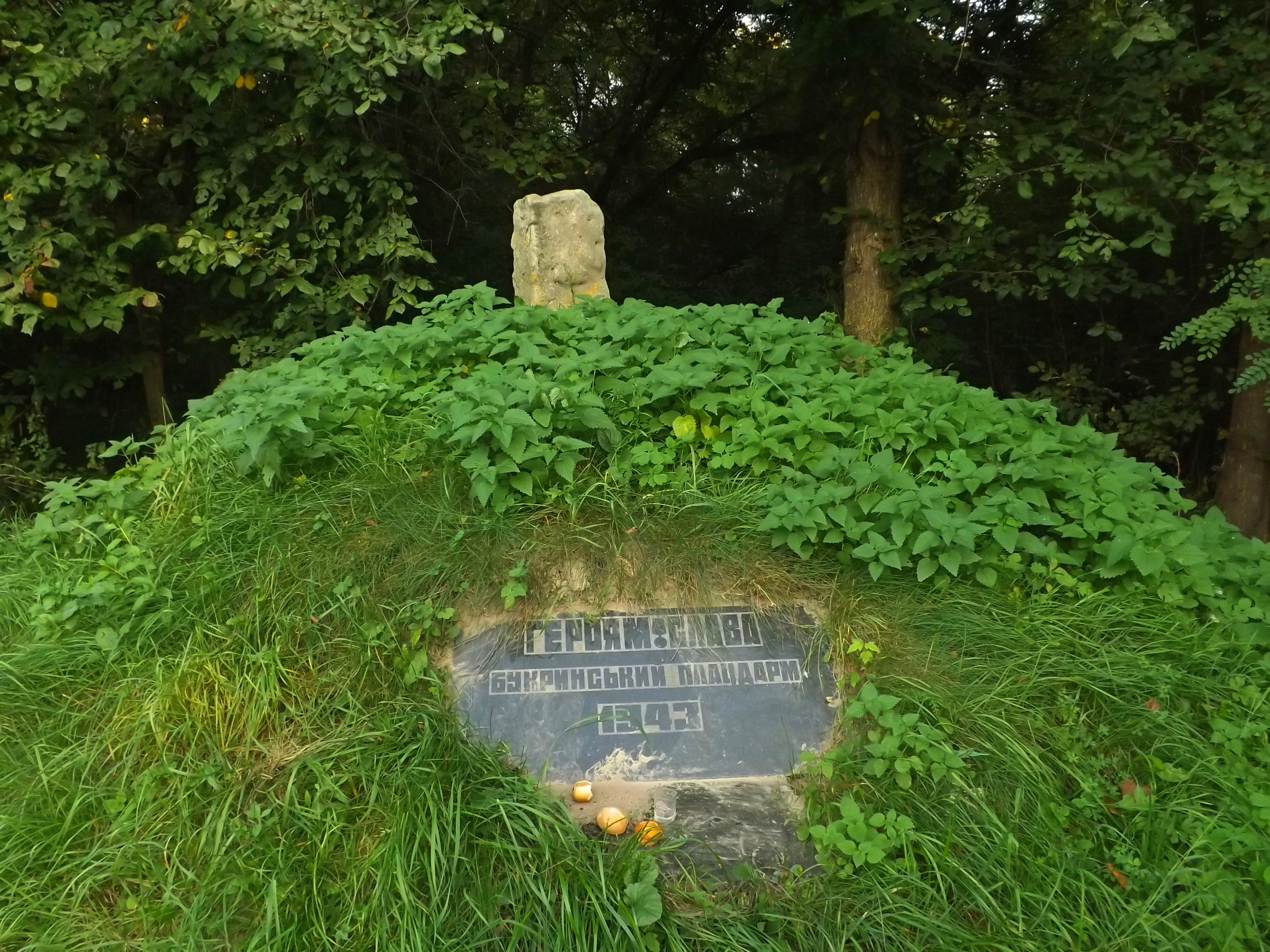
Memorial for the Bukryn Bridgehead (1943)

While on the east bank the personnel strength of the division increased significantly, until by October 10 it stood at 4,975, with only minor losses of guns and mortars. Voronezh Front created a new operational plan in early October which aimed to envelop Kyiv from the north, west and south. The task given to 27th Army was to attack toward Kaharlyk and Fastiv and by October 12 reach the line Fastiv–Bila Tserkva. On October 11 the Army, in close cooperation with 40th Army's 47th Rifle Corps, was to launch its assault along the right flank in the direction of Malyi Bukryn, having four divisions in the first echelon and the 147th in second echelon. The 3rd Guards Tanks was to enter the breach on the Army's sector once Malyi Bukryn was taken. The operation had to be delayed by 24 hours and the 40-minute artillery and airstrike preparation was set to begin at 0700 hours. While the Army set a fairly elaborate deception plan in effect, it failed to mislead the defenders, and stubborn resistance was encountered from the outset. By the end of the day part of the forces of 2nd SS Panzer Division Das Reich had been moved from the area of the Shchuchinka bridgehead, where 40th Army was mounting a weak attack, in order to take up new positions along the boundary between the 27th and 47th Armies north of Buchak. In addition, the 11th Panzer Division began moving up from the south. In the day's fighting the 27th Army and 47th Corps advanced 8km on the main axis, but the German defenses were not penetrated and the advance was met with many counterattacks. Fierce fighting continued overnight.

Vatutin ordered that the attack be continued from 0800 hours on October 13. 27th Army was to reach the line from Yanivka to Shandra with its main forces, while forward detachments were to carry on to the area Mykolaivka–Potok. This was preceded by a 15-minute artillery onslaught, but the assault had no success whatsoever along the entire frontage; in fact the 241st and the 7th Guards Tank Corps were forced to abandon Romashki. Much of the supporting artillery was still on the east bank and was low on ammunition, while German aviation carried out up to 1,000 sorties during the day, which particularly affected the 3rd Guards Tank Army's forces. Further futile fighting followed during October 14-15, until Vatutin ordered the offensive to be shut down at 0040 hours on October 16. As of October 31 the personnel strength of the division had declined to 3,828, but it continued to be overstrength in guns and mortars.

With the failure to break out at Bukryn the Voronezh Front (as of October 20, 1st Ukrainian Front) turned its attention to the bridgehead held by the 38th and 60th Armies at Lyutizh, north of Kyiv. The assault from this position began on November 3 and three days later the Ukrainian capital was liberated. On November 10 the 27th Army again attempted to break out of Bukryn to link up with the armies advancing south from Kyiv, but was unsuccessful. Later in the day Vatutin ordered the 147th, which had recently been transferred to 40th Army, to be pulled from the bridgehead into the Kailov area in order to bring it back across the Dniepr at this point, under command of this Army's 52nd Rifle Corps. By November 15 the 38th Army was advancing on the Brusyliv axis and the division was transferred to this command, along with the rest of the Corps, concentrating at Vasylkiv. It currently had 4,151 personnel, but its total guns and mortars had declined to 80.

== Into Western Ukraine ==
At this time 1st Ukrainian Front was on the defensive, under attack by the 4th Panzer Army. Before the 147th could reach its new position, the 38th Army was struck on November 15 by the 1st Panzer and 1st SS Panzer Leibstandarte SS Adolf Hitler Divisions. In heavy fighting throughout the day the German forces managed to capture Solovyovka and drive the 17th Guards Rifle Corps to the north. The next day the two German divisions continued to attempt to break through to Brusyliv but were only able to reach Divin. Having failed in the direct approach the panzers began attacking in the direction of Vodotyi and Vilnya, reaching the latter by the end of the day. Despite heavy resistance on November 17 the panzers were able to reach the paved road from Kyiv to Zhytomyr, threatening to envelop the Soviet forces there. 38th Army continued to reorganize the following day and the 52nd Corps was to set up a defense on the line of the Zdvizh River from Fasovochka to Yurov to Lazarevka, facing northwest.

By November 25 the Army was defending along the line Stroevka–Stavyshche–Staritskaya–Velikiye Golyaki, facing five panzer and one motorized divisions. At 1000 hours on November 26 the right flank of 52nd Corps, along with two corps of 60th and 1st Guards Armies, went over to the attack, but this was unsuccessful. In December the division was transferred to the 23rd Rifle Corps of 60th Army. Prior to the Rovno–Lutsk offensive in February 1944 the 379th Artillery Regiment was entirely equipped with 76mm cannons, while the 231st Antitank Battalion had been upgraded to the same weapons, giving 36 for the entire division, all horse-drawn. At this time it was again transferred, now to the 101st Rifle Corps of 38th Army, and by the beginning of March it was in the 17th Guards Corps of 1st Guards Army. In a March report the division's personnel were stated as being 90 percent conscripted Ukrainians. In April it was reassigned to 74th Rifle Corps, still in 1st Guards Army. On June 14 General Yakimov was hospitalized after having been wounded in April; after six months of recuperation he did not return to the front. He was replaced by Col. Ivan Stepanovich Gerasimov.

=== Lvov-Sandomierz Offensive ===
At the start of this offensive on July 13 the 147th was still in the 74th Corps, along with the 155th and 276th Rifle Divisions. In the regrouping that preceded the offensive the Front command decided to widen the sectors held by the 1st Guards and 13th Armies in order to concentrate several other armies on attack sectors. 1st Guards took over the entire sector held by 38th Army and part of that held by 60th Army. When the offensive began the 1st Guards Army was deployed on a 118km-wide sector with 12 rifle divisions, of which five were in reserve. The Army was assigned a supporting role in the offensive, prepared to back up 38th Army to its north with its reserve divisions and the 4th Guards Tank Corps once that Army penetrated the German front. From July 14-20 the Front's northern armies successfully penetrated the deep German defenses on the Rava-Ruska and Lviv axes and with all available German reserves committed or already destroyed the Front prepared to expand the offensive on the direction of Drohobych. 1st Guards and 18th Armies had been fighting local actions during this first week in order to pin German forces in place.

1st Guards Army went over to the general offensive on the morning of July 21 and after dislodging rearguards advanced from 6-22km during the day. The Army's commander, Col. Gen. A. A. Grechko, was now ordered to develop an aggressive offensive and capture Stanislav by the end of July 24. From July 24-26 the Army continued to advance against stubborn resistance and took Stanislav on the 27th. In recognition of its part in this victory the 147th received a battle honor:

STANISLAV... 147th Rifle Division (Col. Gerasimov, Ivan Stepanovich)... By order of the Supreme High Command dated 27 July 1944, the troops who participated in the liberation of Stanislav are thanked and a salute was given in Moscow by 20 artillery salvoes from 224 guns.

The day before, Jr. Lt. Aleksandr Pavlovich Koryakov, commander of an antitank rifle platoon of 15th Rifle Regiment distinguished himself in battle with German armor and infantry for the village of Bodnariv, just outside Stanislav. He was able to knock out a tank with his own fire, then destroyed the crew of a self-propelled gun with an antitank grenade before attempting to take over the vehicle and direct it against its former owners. In the process he was mortally wounded by a shell fragment, but his men went on to capture three more self-propelled guns, plus artillery pieces and vehicles in working order. Koryakov was buried in the village, and on March 24, 1945, was posthumously made a Hero of the Soviet Union. In August the 1st Guards Army was moved to 4th Ukrainian Front, but 74th Corps was retained in 1st Ukrainian Front reserves. A month later it was transferred to 13th Army, but in October the 147th returned to 52nd Corps, then back to 74th Corps in November. At the start of 1945 it was assigned to the Army's 24th Rifle Corps.

== Into Poland and Germany ==
The Vistula-Oder offensive began on 1st Ukrainian Front's sector on January 12. Three combined arms armies (13th, 52nd, and 5th Guards), backed by 3rd Guards and 4th Tank Armies and two tank corps, would attack from the Sandomierz bridgehead over the Vistula that had been taken the previous August. The initial objective was Radomsko before exploiting toward Breslau. 4th Tanks would enter the breach on 13th Army's sector and assist it in capturing Kielce before moving on to take crossings over the Pilica River by the third day. The artillery preparation for the main attack began at 1000 hours and continued for an hour and 47 minutes, followed by a rolling barrage. The attack was successful enough that the tanks could be committed during the afternoon.

By the end of the advance though Poland 13th Army had reached the Oder River along the entire front from Keben to Malcz, forced the river with the assistance of 4th Tanks, and captured a bridgehead west of Keben and Steinau up to 16km deep and 30km wide, as well as a smaller one on the left flank. As of January 28 the 24th Corps was in the Army's second echelon on the east bank of the Oder northeast of Wolau.

=== Lower Silesian Offensive ===
1st Ukrainian Front carried out a substantial regrouping from January 29 to February 7 during which the total frontage held by 13th Army was reduced from 86km to just 18km. 24th Corps was in the first echelon alongside the 102nd Rifle Corps. All six divisions of the two corps were in first echelon with two rifle regiments up and one in reserve, and their sectors averaged 3km in width. The offensive began at 0930 hours on February 8, following a 50-minute artillery preparation. 102nd Corps quickly crushed the first German position and advanced up to 8km by day's end. 24th Corps, on the other hand, faced two heavily fortified villages on its right flank and a large woods stretching well to the west. The attacks on the villages were stymied, even with the backing of the 61st Tank Brigade. However the Corps' left flank division took advantage of the success of 52nd Army's attack to its left, advanced 4km and reached Oberau. Jointly these advances put the two Armies in good position to outflank and possibly encircle the Hermann Göring Panzer Division, which was defending the large woods.

On February 9 the 24th Corps advanced up to 15km, reaching Kotzenau with part of its forces while the remainder deployed facing north, blocking passage to the south by the now-surrounded German panzer troops. The next day the main body of 13th Army advanced in the wake of 4th Tank Army, with the objective of forcing the Bober River. On February 11 the Front's shock group faced stiffening German resistance while 24th Corps spent the entire day fighting with rearguards which were covering the main forces' retreat to the Bober. By the end of the day the main shock group had advanced up to 60km and had expanded the width of the breakthrough to 160km, reaching the Bober along a number of sectors. The Corps spent most of February 12 and 13 battling for the town of Sprottau before reaching the Bober in the Sagan area, encountering powerful resistance from German infantry and armor in the eastern part of the town while also forcing a crossing of the river to its north. For their roles in this fighting, on April 5 the 15th Rifle Regiment would be awarded the Order of Aleksandr Nevsky, while the 600th and 640th Rifle Regiments plus the 379th Artillery Regiment would each receive the Order of the Red Star.

Infantry and up to 20 tanks of the Großdeutschland Panzer Corps attacked the bridgehead north of Sagan on February 14. This was countered with the assistance of the 63rd Tank Brigade of 10th Tank Corps and the German force went over to the defensive. Over the next two days the 24th Corps fought to secure Sagan, finally forcing a crossing of the Bober in the center of the town on the 16th, and then cleared its western sector. This success threatened to outflank Großdeutschland and allowed 27th Rifle Corps to expand the main bridgehead. By February 19 the final attempts of the German forces to hold along the Bober crumbled, and what remained of them began retreating to the Neisse River. By February 24 the 13th Army had closed up to the line of that river, and soon went over to the defensive.

=== Berlin Strategic Offensive ===
During the pause along the Neisse the 147th made its final transfer, to 102nd Corps. At about this time the horse-drawn 76mm cannons of the 231st Antitank Battalion were partly or wholly replaced with SU-76s. On April 11, Colonel Gerasimov left the division and was replaced for two days by Col. Grigorii Sergeevich Dudnik, who had been serving as deputy commander of 32nd Guards Rifle Corps. The division had no official commander when the offensive began on April 16, but the next day Col. Nikolai Ivanovich Eremeev was appointed.

At this time the Corps contained the 147th, 117th Guards, and 172nd Divisions. At this time the strength of 13th Army's rifle divisions varied from 4,700 to 5,700 men each. The Army was deployed on the east bank of the Neisse on a 10km front from Klein Bademeusel to just outside Gross Saerchen, with the 27th and 102nd Corps in first echelon and the 24th in second. 102nd Corps was deployed in a single echelon. The 147th established two artillery groups, showing that it was still overstrength in that arm. The first group had 43 76mm cannons and guns, 36 120mm mortars, 12 122mm howitzers, and eight 152mm howitzers. The second had nine of 76mm, another 36 120mm mortars, seven 122mm howitzers, and eight 152mm howitzers. In order to support the assault crossing of the Neisse many of these were sited to fire over open sights.

==== Battle for Garrey ====
The offensive on 1st Ukrainian Front's sector began at dawn on 16 April with attacks across the Neisse and from a bridgehead that had been forced across the river south of Forst in February and made immediate progress. By 2200 hours the 54th Guards Tank Brigade of 7th Guards Tank Corps captured a strongpoint at Simmersdorf before moving on Garrey after dark. At 0230 on April 17 the brigade's lead element took fire from the town's eastern outskirts. Having lost one tank the remainder deployed and broke in from the march, but then stalled due to fire from tanks, antiaircraft guns and Panzerfausts. A prisoner revealed that some five Tiger tanks were in Garrey. The terrain in the area was a boggy glade, which interfered with the tanks' mobility. German tanks were also found in Mattendorf, and woods north of Smarso were in German hands. As the remainder of the brigade came up its commander decided to attack Garrey with motorized infantry supported by tanks, in an effort to open the road to the east bank of the Spree River. At 0400 an antitank rifle company and five SU-76s of the 147th, plus a motorized rifle battalion of the 23rd Guards Motorized Rifle Brigade, reached the area and familiarized with the situation. The units of the 147th were ordered to take positions on the south edge of a grove east of the town inn in order to repulse any counterattacks from the southwest and south. The main attack was to start almost immediately, and by an hour later had only reached the center of the town. After a short artillery preparation the 21st Panzer Division counterattacked with two groups of 20-25 tanks each, with one advancing from Mattendorf toward the inn and breaking through. The reserve of the 56th Guards Tanks took control of the SU-76s and organized an ambush, but the advance was halted by tank fire from the town's eastern outskirts. At 0900 six panzers attempted to outflank the reserve position, but three were set afire from the ambush, causing the rest to fall back. By 1300 the 55th Guards Tank Brigade took Mattendorf and began moving on Trebendorf. The 54th Guards Tanks now reorganized, resumed the attack, and took Garrey. German losses to the brigade and its reinforcements totaled 22 tanks, five antiaircraft guns, and six armored personnel carriers, plus heavy manpower losses, knocking 21st Panzer out of the subsequent fighting.

=== Battle of Halbe ===
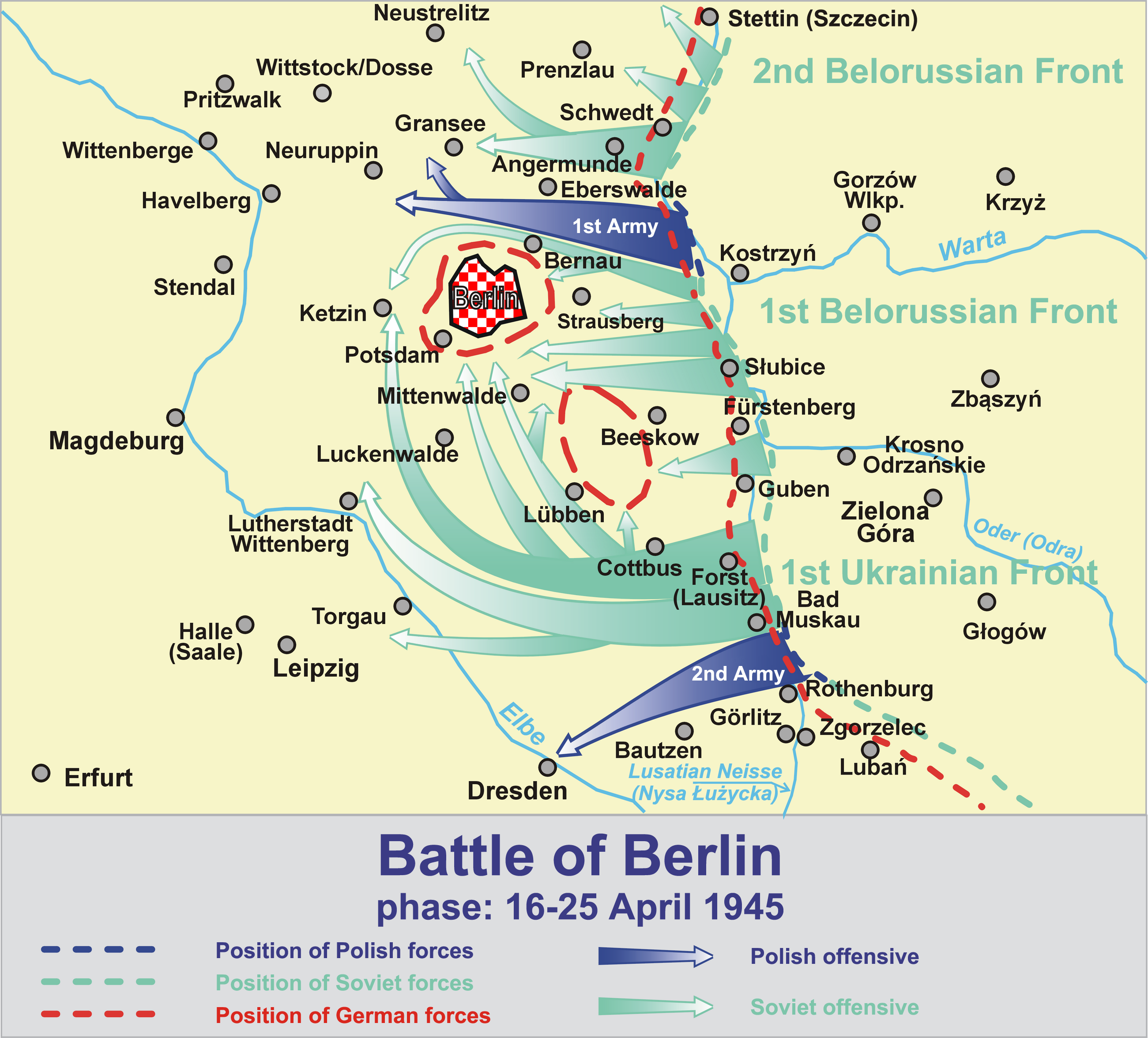
Battle of Berlin, April 16 - 25

Meanwhile, the remainder of the 147th, plus elements of 7th Guards Tanks, had outflanked Garrey from the southeast and seized the strongpoint at Gablenz before advancing to the Fliess Canal. Overall, an advance of 7km had been achieved, breaking into the second German defense zone to a depth of 500-1,500m, reaching a line from Gablenz to Bosdorf Creek. Some German forces were already falling back to the Spree. With these successes the STAVKA authorized Marshal I. S. Konev, the Front commander, to force the Spree overnight and push on to the northwest with both of his tank armies to attack Berlin from the south. However reinforcements were moving up to defend the third German line. 13th Army pressed rearguards along the river's east bank and beat off several counterattacks. Konev now chose to strike between Cottbus and Spremberg, where he understood the defense to be weakest. During April 18 the 102nd Corps, still operating with 7th Guards Tanks, completed its breakthrough of the second zone and crossed the Spree from the march near Brezinhen before penetrating the third zone to a depth of some 4km, for an overall advance of 13km, reaching a line from Neuhausen to Groß Doebbern, a move that prevented the 344th Infantry Division from taking position on the third zone.

13th Army faced a highly complex situation on April 19, with large German groupings still near its flanks at Cottbus and Spremberg. The Army commander, Col. Gen. N. P. Pukhov, detached the 172nd, plus three other divisions, for flank protection, while the 147th had moved to 102nd Corps' second echelon, moving to Groß Ossnig by the end of the day. However, the Army's formations were now extended over an arc some 65km in length. The next day the Corps continued to follow the 3rd Guards Tanks to the west, covering another 30km. The 147th and 172nd encountered little to no resistance and reached a line from Waltersdorf to outside Brenitz by dusk, while 117th Guards covered the Army's right flank from the Cottbus direction, where German 9th Army was rapidly becoming encircled. During April 21 the Army continued it pursuit of scattered German units westward. After Luckau was taken the 147th advanced in an echelon formation on the right flank, reaching the Ukro area by the end of the day.

Overnight the 9th Army began withdrawing to the west, trying to break away from the pursuit of 13th and 5th Guards Armies. Meanwhile, 3rd Guards Tanks was about to break into the southern outskirts of Berlin, as the 102nd and 27th Corps advanced another 45km, reaching Jüterbog–Kropstedt–Bulzig–Essen–Schweinitz by midnight. This effectively prevented any effort to relieve 9th Army from the outside. During April 23 the 102nd and part of the 27th covered another 6-18km, fighting along a line from Treuenbrietzen to Kropstedt to outside Elster by the day's close. By now the 117th Guards had been moved to 24th Corps. German 9th Army was now pressing for a breakout against 52nd and 2nd Polish Armies. The following day Pukhov's forces attacked with two corps along the north bank of the Elbe River heading west, fighting against the Theodor Körner Infantry Division, 47th Security Regiment, "Wittenberg" Battalion, 957th Antitank Battalion, and battalions of Volkssturm. Advancing another 10km, the Army's leading units reached the east outskirts of Wittenberg. During April 25 the pincers of 1st Ukrainian and 1st Belorussian Fronts were closing to the west of Berlin. 13th Army and 5th Guards Mechanized Corps were fighting heavily near Wittenberg, Beelitz, and Golzow with Theodor Körner and other scratch divisions which were attempting, unsuccessfully, to reinforce Berlin.

On April 26 the encircled 9th Army in the Frankfurt–Guben area had some 14 divisions, along with several independent units and rear organizations. The previous day it had received orders from Hitler's headquarters to break out toward Halbe in order to link up with 12th Army southwest of the capital. The breakout group, including more than 50 tanks, attacked west at 0800 hours at the boundary of 3rd Guards and 28th Armies. Within two hours this had reached the northern outskirts of Baruth and had retaken Munchendorf, although the former remained in the hands of the 395th Division. In the fighting through the afternoon and overnight a large part of the breakthrough group was partly destroyed northeast of Baruth. By the day's end 102nd Corps, on 13th Army's right flank, was holding along its previous line, from Beelitz to Garrey, having beaten off several counterattacks. The pocket had shrunk to no more than 900km^{2}.

Given the likelihood of continued efforts to escape, Konev ordered maximum reinforcements along the axis Wendisch-Buchholz–Baruth–Luckenwalde. The next attempt began on the morning of April 27 in the Halbe area, while the previous day's breakthrough group was still resisting north of Baruth, although it was eliminated later in the day. At the same time the 12th Army was attempting to break through to Berlin, primarily through 5th Guards Mechanized and the main part of 13th Army, but this was repulsed. During the next day troops of both Fronts were involved in destroying what remained of 9th Army's pocket, which was now no more than 400km^{2}. 102nd Corps and 5th Guards Mechanized tried to improve their positions by attacking to the west, but ran into stubborn resistance. The breakout efforts continued overnight, and a reinforced 12th Army attempted to reach Luckenwalde. The breakout attempt began at 0100 hours on April 29, led by up to 10,000 infantry and 35-40 tanks against the boundary of the two Fronts. Despite initial success it was halted by 3rd Guards Rifle Corps until another 35,000 infantry were brought up and created a fresh penetration. By the end of the day a third pocket had been created containing the westernmost part of 9th Army, and the German command was organizing a new effort by 12th Army to break through 102nd Corps and 5th Guards Mechanized on the Beelitz–Niemegk sector. This would require crossing 30km of Soviet-held territory, after a day of fighting that had caused heavy German casualties for few gains.

Overnight, Konev took a number of steps to ensure the final destruction of 9th Army. Pukhov ordered the 117th Guards to attack toward Kummersdorf to end further breakthroughs to Luckenwalde. 102nd Corps was to continue to prevent 12th Army from reaching the same objective. Altogether, the encircled grouping gained just 10km westward with its breakthrough force, while the trailing elements were killed or captured near Wendisch-Buchholz. During the day 1st Ukrainian Front took 24,000 prisoners. During the night the breakthrough force penetrated between the 117th Guards and 4th Guards Tanks and reached Beelitz, where it ran into 5th Guards Mechanized. By the end of May 1 the 9th Army had finally been eliminated, at about the time the battle for Berlin was ending. Konev was ordered by the STAVKA to prepare for a new advance toward Prague.

== Postwar ==
Colonel Eremeev left the 147th on May 4, being replaced by Colonel Dudnik. He would remain in command until the division was disbanded, then furthered his military education before taking further commands, including several rifle corps, before retiring on April 24, 1967, with the rank of lieutenant general. The division marched with its Corps and Army into Czechoslovakia before the fighting stopped on May 11. On May 28 it was recognized for its successes in the battle for Halbe with the award of the Order of Bogdan Khmelnitsky, 2nd Degree.

According to STAVKA Order No. 11096 of May 29, 1945, part 3, 13th Army was to be moved to the area of Bautzen by June 10. Before the year's end the 102nd Corps returned to the USSR, placing its headquarters at Zhytomyr, while the 147th was stationed at Berdychiv. It was disbanded there in July 1946.
