= 241st Rifle Division =

241st Rifle Division (December 13, 1941 – July 1945)
- Active: 1941–1945
- Country: Soviet Union
- Branch: Red Army
- Type: Infantry
- Size: Division
- Engagements: Demyansk Pocket; Battle of Demyansk (1943); Belgorod–Kharkov offensive operation Battle of the Dniepr; Battle of Kiev (1943); Zhitomir–Berdichev offensive Uman–Botoșani offensive Lvov–Sandomierz offensive Battle of the Dukla Pass; Western Carpathian offensive Moravia–Ostrava offensive Prague offensive
- Decorations: Order of Bogdan Khmelnitsky; Order of the Red Star
- Battle honours: Vinnytsia

Commanders
- Notable commanders: Maj. Gen. Ivan Danilovich Chernyakhovskii; Maj. Gen. Pavel Grigorevich Arabei; Col. Timofei Andronikovich Andrienko; Maj. Gen. Stanislav Antonovich Ivanovskii

The 241st Rifle Division was formed as an infantry division of the Red Army from the remnants of the 28th Tank Division in November/December 1941. It was based on the shtat (table of organization and equipment) of July 29, 1941 and was reformed in the 27th Army of Northwestern Front. It was soon moved to 34th Army and later to 53rd Army in the same Front, playing a relatively minor role in the battles against German 16th Army's forces in the Demyansk salient into the first months of 1943. Following the evacuation of the salient the division was moved southward to the Steppe Military District, joining the 2nd formation of the 27th Army. It next saw action in Voronezh Front's counteroffensive following the German offensive at Kursk, becoming involved in the complex fighting around Okhtyrka and then advancing through eastern Ukraine toward the Dniepr River. The 241st took part in the unsuccessful battles to break out of the bridgehead at Bukryn and after the liberation of Kyiv it was reassigned to 38th Army, remaining under that command, assigned to various rifle corps, mostly the 67th, for the duration of the war. In the spring of 1944, it won a battle honor in western Ukraine, and during the summer several of its subunits received recognition in the battles for Lviv and Sambir. During the autumn it entered the Carpathian Mountains and took part in the fighting for the Dukla Pass before being transferred, along with the rest of 38th Army, to the 4th Ukrainian Front. This Front advanced through Slovakia and southern Poland in the first months of 1945 and the division's subunits won further distinctions, but the division itself only received one, fairly minor, decoration. It ended the war near Prague and was disbanded during the summer.

== Formation ==
By October the 28th was a tank division in name only and its remaining men were fighting as infantry. Sources differ as to the exact date of the division's official reformation, some stating it was in November, but Grylev (see Bibliography) gives it as December 13, the same date that Col. Ivan Danilovich Chernyakhovskii was appointed to command. This officer had previously led the 28th Tanks and would be promoted to the rank of major general on May 5, 1942. Once formed the division had the following order of battle:

- 264th Rifle Regiment (later 303rd)
- 318th Rifle Regiment
- 332nd Rifle Regiment (from 125th Tank Regiment)
- 1010th Artillery Regiment
- 12th Antitank Battalion
- 68th Antiaircraft Battery (until 28 February 1943)
- 32nd Mortar Battalion (until 5 October 1942)
- 114th Reconnaissance Company (later 241st)
- 698th Sapper Battalion
- 898th Signal Battalion (later 792nd Signal Company)
- 506th Medical/Sanitation Battalion
- 486th Chemical Defense (Anti-gas) Company (later 286th)
- 552nd Auto Transport Company
- 404th Field Bakery
- 881st Divisional Veterinary Hospital
- 838th Field Postal Station (later 1538th, 23857th)
- 689th Field Office of the State Bank (later 1017th)

As of December 1 the division was one of just three in 27th Army, along with the 23rd and 33rd Rifle Divisions. On December 16 the Army was redesignated as the 4th Shock Army, and the 241st was reassigned to the 34th Army, still in Northwestern Front.

=== Battle of Demyansk ===
34th Army was under command of Maj. Gen. N. E. Berzarin. As the Red Army's winter counteroffensive widened from the Moscow area he was ordered to form two division-sized shock groups to support the efforts of 11th and 3rd Shock Armies but otherwise to fix as much of German 16th Army in place as possible with diversionary attacks. The first shock group was based on the 254th Rifle Division which faced the weakened 290th Infantry Division. Beginning on January 10 the 254th infiltrated the positions of the 290th with ski troops through frozen marshes and cut the supplies of three company-sized strongpoints which were gradually eliminated by the rest of Berzarin's forces. Over the following week the 241st advanced to the west of Lake Seliger. The combined advances left the 290th in a long, thin salient between 34th and 11th Armies.

At the beginning of February, the 290th Infantry was still holding east of the Pola River but its II Army Corps and several other German units were vulnerable to encirclement at Demyansk. The bridge at Davidovo over the Redya River was the target for 11th Army's 1st Guards Rifle Corps and was taken on February 5, after which the Corps reached the village of Ramushevo on the Lovat River three days later, cutting the last road to Demyansk. The 290th was virtually surrounded with Soviet ski troops operating freely in its rear. To avoid annihilation it was permitted to pull back south from the Pola. On February 25 the full encirclement of II Corps was completed. The STAVKA ordered that Northwestern Front should crush the pocketed force within four or five days; meanwhile reinforcements were arriving from Germany and the airlifting of supplies was well underway.

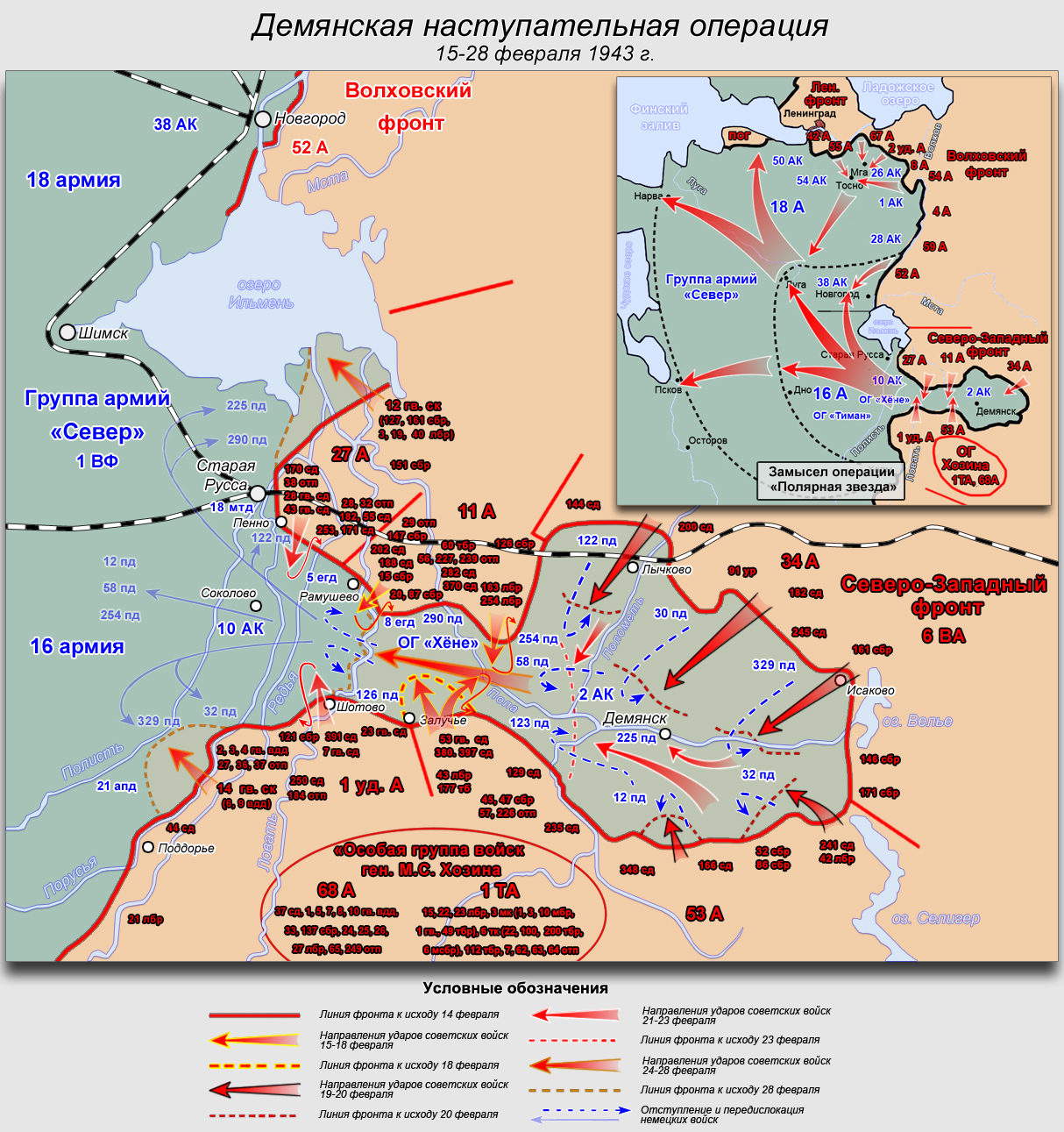
Soviet positions at Demyansk, spring 1943. The 241st was in the 53rd Army sector southeast of Demyansk.

The German attempt to relieve the pocket, Operation Brückenschlag, began on March 21 but the linkup with the besieged grouping was not achieved until April 21. The so-called "Ramushevo corridor" was less than 4km wide and often under Soviet artillery fire so II Corps was still heavily dependent on air supply. During April the 241st was reassigned to 53rd Army. Chernyakhovskii had already taken over the 18th Tank Corps when he left the 241st on June 24; he was replaced two days later by his chief of staff, Col. Pavel Grigorevich Arabei. Chernyakhovskii would go on to command 60th Army and 3rd Belorussian Front, being promoted to the rank of army general and being twice made a Hero of the Soviet Union before being mortally wounded in East Prussia in February 1945. Arabei would be promoted to major general on September 15, 1943. From May to October Northwestern Front made several attempts to sever the corridor. German engineers turned the area into a fortified zone, complete with deep barbed wire obstacles and extensive minefields. 11th Army was on the north side of the corridor while 1st Shock Army held the south side; 34th and 53rd Armies covered the remainder of the salient.

One of the victims of those minefields was the deputy commander of the 241st, Maj. Gen. Ivan Pavlovich Shevchuk. He had distinguished himself during the Russian Civil War in the Far East as commander of the 1st Tungussk Partisan Detachment, winning the Order of the Red Banner in 1928, and up to 1938 served as acting chief of the Construction Section of the Pacific Fleet. He had been given command of the 2nd formation of the 55th Rifle Division in December 1941, but his previous experience was not adequate to lead a division in modern warfare. As a result, he was overly "coarse" in his dealings with his subordinates; as well, his unskillful leadership led to excessive casualties during offensive fighting in May 1942. In consequence, Shevchuk was brought before an 11th Army military tribunal. He was relieved of command of the 55th on May 10, but due to his status as a Civil War hero he kept his rank and was appointed as deputy commander of the 241st. In the following months Shevchuk displayed excessive and ostentatious foolhardiness in combat situations, which seemed to indicate he was courting death to atone for his disgrace. If so, he got his wish on October 28, when he embarked on a mounted reconnaissance of the division's frontage. His horse stepped on a German landmine, which killed the horse and blew off both of his legs; he died a few hours later and was buried the next day with full military honors.

On January 31, 1943, the German High Command ordered that the Demyansk salient be evacuated, in the wake of the encirclement and upcoming destruction of 6th Army at Stalingrad. By this time most of Northwestern Front's best divisions were battered wrecks. Not knowing the German plan, Marshal G. K. Zhukov was making plans for his Operation Polyarnaya Zvezda to finally crush the salient as a preliminary to the relief of Leningrad. The division had been earmarked for this operation, which began on February 15, but was repulsed with heavy losses. Operation Ziethen began on February 17, at which time the 241st was still near the northwest tip of Lake Seliger, facing the 32nd Infantry Division. 53rd Army attempted to harass the withdrawing forces, primarily with ski troops, but the German withdrawal freed up the reserves they needed to reinforce their lines along the Lovat, and the "pursuit" through the devastated landscape achieved little.

=== Redeployment to the South ===
With the end of Ziethen the Red Army was left with redundant forces in the Demyansk area, while German forces were threatening the gains made in the central sector of the front during the late winter. Under the terms of STAVKA Order No. 46088 of March 29 the 241st was named as one of four rifle divisions to be moved to the Reserve of the Supreme High Command for redeployment to the Kursk region. Consequently, on April 1 it was located in the reserve of Northwestern Front, and a month later it was part of the 2nd formation of 27th Army in the Reserve of the Supreme High Command. By the start of June, as both sides prepared for their summer offensives, it was with that Army in the Steppe Military District.

== Into Ukraine ==
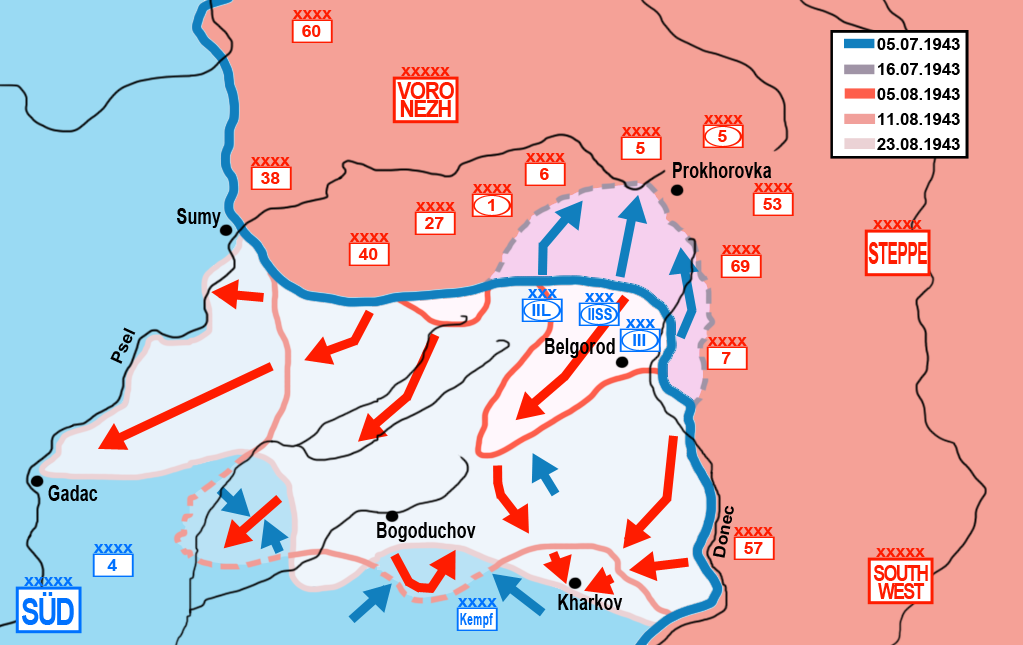
Operation Polkovodets Rumyantsev. Note initial position of 27th Army.

The Battle of Kursk began on July 5, and four days later the Steppe Military District was redesignated as Steppe Front. 27th Army was deployed along a line from Rossoshnoye to Nikolskoye and consisted of six rifle divisions (71st, 147th, 155th, 163rd, 166th and 241st) plus the 93rd Tank Brigade.

27th Army saw no significant action during the German offensive, and by the beginning of August it had been transferred to Voronezh Front, which was still holding the southern half of the salient. In preparation for the counteroffensive, which began on August 3, the Army, which had been reinforced with additional armor and artillery assets, was concentrated behind the 40th Army's center in the Marino–Krasnaya Yaruga–Borisopole area. On the night of the operation's third day the Army was to deploy along the 11km-wide front from Kresanov to Soldatskoye while its main forces concentrated in the center to break through the German defense along the 6km sector Kasilovo–Novo-Berezovka. The Army was organized in two echelons, with four rifle divisions, a tank brigade, a Guards heavy tank regiment, and other reinforcements in the first echelon. The shock group consisted of the 241st and 163rd Divisions in first echelon, two second echelon divisions (155th and 71st), two tank corps, and the greater part of the reinforcements.

=== Operation Polkovodets Rumyantsev ===
The Front commander, Army Gen. N. F. Vatutin, ordered 27th Army on August 4 to organize a powerful reconnaissance-in-force along its entire front and prepare for attacking with its main forces. Along a number of sectors this reconnaissance penetrated up to 2-3km into the German defense. Later that day Marshal G. K. Zhukov issued instructions for the STAVKA that included:

1. For the purpose of widening the breach toward the west, on the morning of 5 August the 27th and 40th armies are to begin their offensive in the general direction of Graivoron.

On the morning of August 5 the shock groups of the two Armies attacked; due to the success of 27th Army's reconnaissance in disrupting the German defense system it limited itself to a powerful artillery onslaught of only 15 minutes. Having crushed the resistance of the 57th Infantry Division both Armies broke through the German front along a 26km-wide sector and by the close of the day had advanced in fighting 8-20km and reached the line Starosele–Kasilovo–Ivanovskaya Lisitsa–Nikitskoe. During the day the 11th Panzer Division had made repeated counterattacks with no success and at considerable cost in casualties.

The orders for August 6 directed 27th Army, along with the 4th Guards Tank Corps, to attack southwest towards Okhtyrka and reach the front Oposhnya–Bolshaya Rublevka–Kachalovka; it was subsequently planned to attack along both banks of the Vorskla River in the general direction of Poltava, while part of the Army's forces would assist the 6th Guards Army in destroying the German Tomarovka–Borisovka group of forces. On August 7 units of Panzergrenadier Division Großdeutschland, along with the 51st Heavy Tank Battalion (Tiger Is), arrived from the Karachev area and took part in fighting against 27th Army in the Bolshaya Pisarevka area. Following the elimination of the German forces in the Borisovka the Army continued to attack to the southwest along the Vorskla, liberating Bolshaya Pisarevka, an important paved road junction.

==== Fighting for Okhtyrka ====
During August 8-11 the 27th Army developed the offensive toward Okhtyrka. Continuing on the morning of August 8 to pursue units of the 323rd and remnants of the 255th Infantry Divisions along both banks of the Vorskla, and throwing back elements of Großdeutschland, by the close of the next day the Army's units had reached a line from Kyrykivka to the northern and eastern outskirts of Staraya Ryabina to Kupevakha. On August 10 it outflanked the Staraya Ryabina and Yablochnoye strongpoints from the northwest and south, defeated their garrisons and opened a path for the subsequent development of the offensive on Okhtyrka and Kotelva. The following day the 4th Guards Tanks, which was operating with the Army, broke into the eastern outskirts of Okhtyrka, while the 5th Guards Tank Corps broke into Kotelva and completely captured it. By this time the Army's divisions had reached the line Petrovskii–Vysokoe–Parkhomivka–Krasnokutsk, having covered more than 50km in four days.

27th Army was now tasked with reaching the line from Shilovka to Oposhnya to Artemovka and from August 12-17 was engaged in stubborn fighting along the line of the Vorskla. On the first day the Army's right flank formations continued to be involved in street fighting for Okhtyrka while its left wing reached the river's east bank along the sector Khukhrya–Kotelna–Kolontaev. On August 14 the Army continued to wage fierce battles in the Okhtyrka area, beating back German counterattacks. During the afternoon Vatutin gave the Army its mission for the following day: to destroy the German's Okhtyrka group of forces, capture a bridgehead along the western bank of the Vorskla, and reach a line 5km west of Okhtyrka. During the second half of August 15, due to the difficult situation along the front of 6th Guards Army, which was being forced to fall back in the face of a German counterattack, the Army was ordered to secure its left flank along the Merla River with the 241st and the 5th Guards Tanks. On August 16-17 German resistance along the Army's front increased sharply. With the support of significant air groups the Army's units were repeatedly counterattacked and a number of villages changed hands several times. On the second day the Army, which was dispersed along a 170km-wide front, was not able to advance along a single sector and control of Okhtyrka remained disputed.

At this point the German command, which had previously been defeated in its efforts to recapture Bohodukhiv by 6th Guards Army, began regrouping to attempt to reach the objective via Okhtyrka. To this end it concentrated Großdeutschland, the 7th and part of the 19th Panzer Division, the 10th Panzergrenadier Division, two heavy tank battalions, and four artillery regiments near and to the west of the town. As a result, it managed to achieve a significant superiority of force by mid-month along the front from Okhtyrka to Oposhnya to Krasnokutsk. On August 18 this grouping began an attack along the Okhtyrka axis against 27th Army's right flank. At 0830 hours, following a powerful artillery preparation and massed air attacks against the 155th and 166th Divisions the German grouping committed up to 200 tanks plus motorized infantry along the Pologii–Moshenki sector with continuing air support. the front of the 166th was pierced and by the end of the day the defense had been penetrated to a depth of 24km, creating a narrow pocket up to 7km in depth. During the morning the 4th Guards Army's 7th and 8th Guards Rifle Divisions had entered the battle against the breakthrough units, while the 166th's artillery claimed more than 30 panzers out of action. On the same day the 3rd SS Panzer Division Totenkopf attacked from the Kovalevka–Konstantinovka area in the direction of Kolontaev and Lyubovka but was beaten off by the 241st and units of the 5th Guards Tanks.

With the German arrival in the Kaplunovka area the situation along 27th Army's left flank quickly became more difficult as the 71st and 241st Divisions, plus the 4th and 5th Guards Tanks, faced the danger of encirclement. Stalin personally instructed Zhukov, who was at Vatutin's headquarters, as to the necessity of eliminating the German Okhtyrka grouping as quickly as possible and also to adopt emergency measures to ward off the possible isolation the Army's left flank formations. At 1650 hours Vatutin issued orders to his armies to restore the situation in the Okhtyrka area through joint attacks. On the basis of Stalin's instructions the 71st was ordered to withdraw its main forces from the west bank of the Vorskla during the night of August 18/19. At about the same time the 241st was operationally subordinated to 6th Guards Army and was defending along the Merchik River with the help of 5th Guards Tanks. The heavy fighting against the German breakthrough continued through August 19, as the German efforts to deepen the thrust through repeated attacks to the east largely failed. The 241st, now defending along the Merla, fought off all attacks during the day and held its positions. The next day, having failed to reach Bohodukhiv, the German command suspended its offensive along this axis and dispatched it main forces to eliminate the Soviet salient that had formed in to Kotelva area, but this fared no better. In three days of fighting the 27th Army claimed 180 tanks, 50 guns, and four batteries of Nebelwerfers destroyed, plus two regiments of motorized infantry nearly completely destroyed and 30 planes shot down by its antiaircraft guns.

On the morning of August 21 the 27th Army received orders to attack toward Okhtyrka to complete the defeat of the German grouping in conjunction with 47th Army, but 6th Guards Army was to remain holding its present positions. The town was finally liberated on August 24, one day after Steppe Front recaptured Kharkiv for the final time. By the start of September the 241st had been re-subordinated to 27th Army as the advance through eastern Ukraine began.

=== Battles on the Dniepr ===
As of September 20, as it closed on the Dniepr River, the division had 3,651 personnel on strength, armed with 24 82mm and 13 120mm mortars, just four 76mm regimental and 19 76mm divisional guns, plus 10 122mm howitzers, making it the weakest of 27th Army's four remaining rifle divisions. By September 25 the Army had concentrated in the Pereiaslav-Khmelnytskyi area and two days later Vatutin made the decision to commit it into the fighting for a bridgehead in the Bukryn area:

The commander of the 27th Army is to immediately begin crossing over the Dnepr River along the 3rd Guards Tank Army's sector and that of the left flank of the 40th Army. The crossing of the troops is to be completed by the morning of 29.9.43. Following the crossing, the army is to advance immediately to the line excluding Yanivka-Shankra, where it is to arrive no later than 30.9.43 and relieve here the units of the 40th Army.

The 27th Army's forces crossed slowly, and only its infantry, without artillery. The 147th Division got across on September 28 near Hryhorivka, followed the next day by part of the forces of the 155th and 100th Rifle Divisions, leaving the 241st on the east bank. Due to uninterrupted counterattacks these forces were immediately committed into the fighting. By the close of September 29 the Bukryn bridgehead was roughly 11km across and 6km deep.

==== Bukryn Bridgehead ====
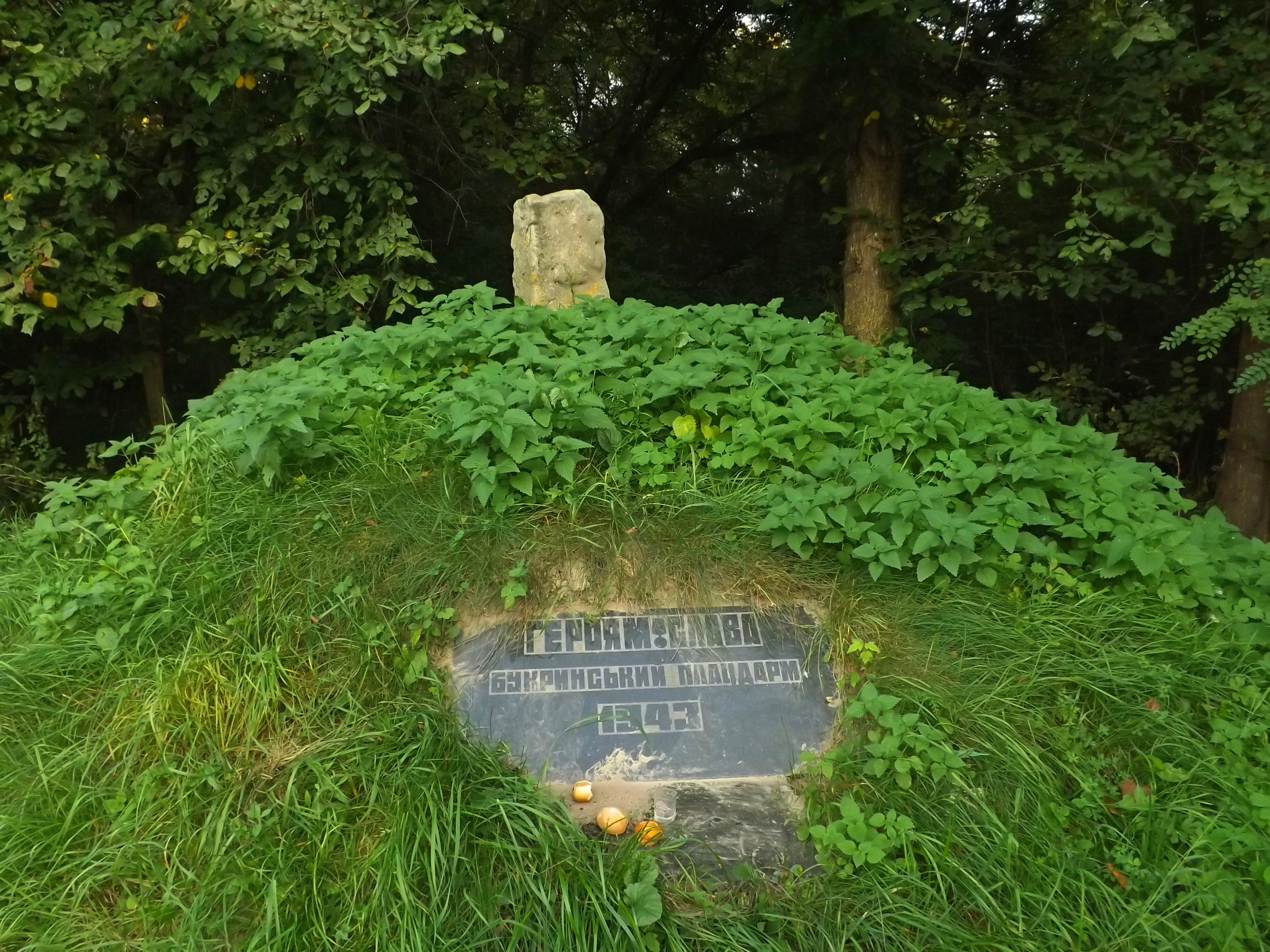
Memorial for the Bukryn Bridgehead (1943)

While on the east bank the personnel strength of the division increased significantly, until by October 10 it stood at 6,058, although it remained short of guns and mortars. Voronezh Front created a new operational plan in early October which aimed to envelop Kyiv from the north, west and south. The task given to 27th Army was to attack toward Kaharlyk and Fastiv and by October 12 reach the line Fastiv–Bila Tserkva. On October 11 the Army, in close cooperation with 40th Army's 47th Rifle Corps, was to launch its assault along the right flank in the direction of Malyi Bukryn, having the 241st and three other divisions in the first echelon and the 147th Division in second echelon. The 3rd Guards Tanks was to enter the breach on the Army's sector once Malyi Bukryn was taken. The operation had to be delayed by 24 hours and the 40-minute artillery and airstrike preparation was set to begin at 0700 hours. While the Army set a fairly elaborate deception plan in effect, it failed to mislead the defenders, and stubborn resistance was encountered from the outset. By the end of the day part of the forces of 2nd SS Panzer Division Das Reich had been moved from the area of the Shchuchinka bridgehead, where 40th Army was mounting a weak attack, in order to take up new positions along the boundary between the 27th and 47th Armies north of Buchak. In addition, the 11th Panzer Division began moving up from the south. In the day's fighting the 27th Army and 47th Corps advanced 8km on the main axis, but the German defenses were not penetrated and the advance was met with many counterattacks. Fierce fighting continued overnight.

Vatutin ordered that the attack be continued from 0800 hours on October 13. 27th Army was to reach the line from Yanivka to Shandra with its main forces, while forward detachments were to carry on to the area Mykolaivka–Potok. This was preceded by a 15-minute artillery onslaught, but the assault had no success whatsoever along the entire frontage; in fact the 241st and the 7th Guards Tank Corps were forced to abandon Romashki. Much of the supporting artillery was still on the east bank and was low on ammunition, while German aviation carried out up to 1,000 sorties during the day, which particularly affected the 3rd Guards Tank Army's forces. Further futile fighting followed during October 14-15, until Vatutin ordered the offensive to be shut down at 0040 hours on October 16.

With the failure to break out at Bukryn the Voronezh Front (as of October 20, 1st Ukrainian Front) turned its attention to the bridgehead held by the 38th and 60th Armies at Lyutizh, north of Kyiv. The assault from this position began on November 3 and three days later the Ukrainian capital was liberated. On November 10 the 27th Army again attempted to break out of Bukryn to link up with the armies advancing south from Kyiv, but was unsuccessful. Later in the day Vatutin ordered the 241st to be pulled from the bridgehead into the Kailov area in order to bring it back across the Dniepr at this point, under command of 40th Army's 52nd Rifle Corps. By November 15 the 38th Army was advancing on the Brusyliv axis and the division was transferred to this command,, joining the 21st Rifle Corps. It would remain in this Army for the duration of the war. On the same date it was recorded as having 4,624 personnel on strength, and was still short of heavy weapons.

==== Kyiv Strategic Defensive Operation ====
At this time 1st Ukrainian Front was on the defensive, under attack by the 4th Panzer Army. Before the 241st could reach its new Corps, the 38th Army was struck on November 15 by the 1st Panzer and 1st SS Panzer Leibstandarte SS Adolf Hitler Divisions. In heavy fighting throughout the day the German forces managed to capture Solovyovka and drive the 17th Guards Rifle Corps to the north. The next day the two German divisions continued to attempt to break through to Brusyliv but were only able to reach Divin. Having failed in the direct approach the panzers began attacking in the direction of Vodotyi and Vilnya, reaching the latter by the end of the day. Despite heavy resistance on November 17 the panzers were able to reach the paved road from Kyiv to Zhytomyr, threatening to envelop the Soviet forces there. 38th Army continued to reorganize the following day and the 21st Corps was engaged in defensive fighting along a front from outside Morozovka to Vilshka to Luchin to Stavni.

Overnight, Vatutin issued orders to the Army to launch a counteroffensive on November 21. During November 19 the momentum of 4th Panzer Army began to decline, although 17th Guards Corps was forced to abandon Morozovka. After regrouping the panzer forces focused on encircling 38th Army's Brusyliv group of forces and although the town was taken on November 23 and Vatutin's planned counterstroke was suspended the encirclement was not successful. Fighting continued through November 25-29 but both sides were by now effectively played out. In the last days of the month the 241st was again reassigned, now to 17th Guards Corps.

==== Zhitomir–Berdichev and Proskurov-Chernivtsi Offensives ====
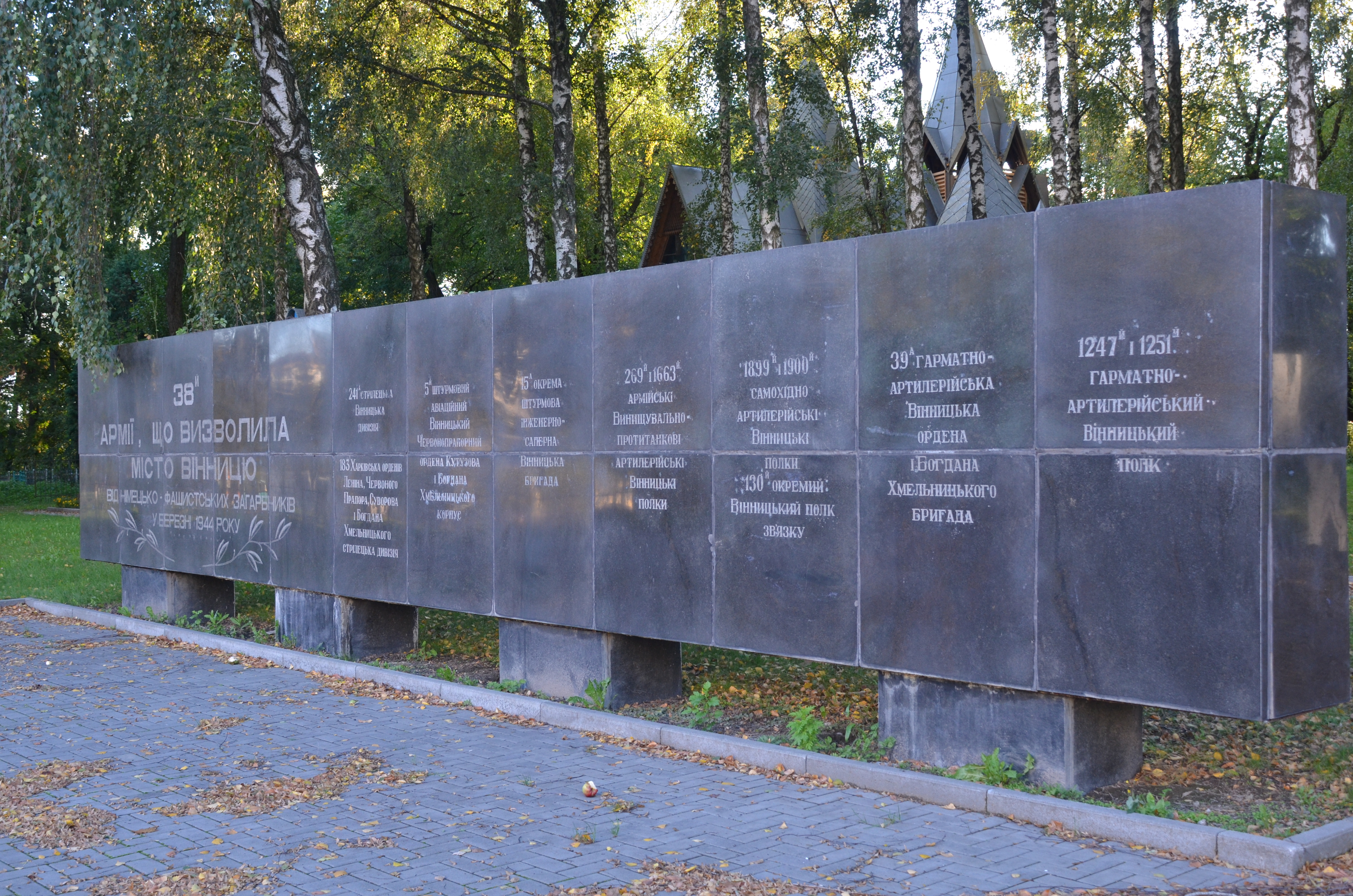
Memorial at Vinnytsia to units of 38th Army, including the 241st. (In Ukrainian)

Vatutin's counteroffensive finally began on December 24 but initially only involved the 1st Guards and the 1st Tank Armies. It soon expanded to include the 38th Army, which was facing the German XIII Army Corps north of Zhytomyr. By December 30 the 4th Panzer Army's front was breaking apart and a 58km-wide gap had opened between it and XIII Corps; the following day Zhytomyr was liberated for the second time. On January 4, 1944, that Corps, attempting to hold at and northwest of Berdychiv, reported that it was falling apart, and that city fell a few days later. By the end of the month the lines had stabilized north of Vinnytsia.

The offensive was renewed on March 4. During January the division had been shifted to 101st Rifle Corps with the 70th Guards Rifle Division, later joined by the 211th Rifle Division. 38th Army was on the left (south) flank of the Front and its initial objective was Vinnytsia, after which it was to continue to advance southwest toward Zhmerynka, which had been designated as a Festung (fortress) by Hitler. The former was liberated on March 20 and the 241st was recognized for its role with a battle honor:

VINNITSA – ...241st Rifle Division (Maj. Gen. Arabei, Pavel Grigorevich)... The troops that participated in the liberation of Vinnitsa, by order of the Supreme Commander-in-Chief of 20 March 1944 and a commendation in Moscow, are given a salute of 20 artillery salvoes by 224 guns.

Later in the month the division was again reassigned, now to the 67th Rifle Corps.

=== Lviv–Sandomierz Offensive ===
General Arabei was injured and hospitalized in an auto accident on July 10. He was in convalescence until November when he was sent to study at the Military Academy of the General Staff until April 1945. Postwar he entered the training establishment and also held several commands, including the 120th Guards Rifle Division, until his retirement in April 1956. He was replaced by Col. Timofei Andronikovich Andrienko. In the planning for the Lviv-Sandomierz operation in July the 38th Army was to penetrate the German defense in the Bzovitsa and Bogdanovka sector on a front of 6km. It would then develop the offensive with seven divisions in the direction of Peremyshliany with the objective of encircling the German Lviv grouping in cooperation with the 4th Tank and 60th Armies.

The offensive began on July 13 and went largely according to this plan; Lviv was liberated on July 27 and by August 4 units of 4th Tank and 38th Armies were fighting in positions from Khyriv to north of Sambir and further along the Dniestr River to Rozvaduv. One of the 241st's rifle regiments was awarded a battle honor:

LVOV... 318th Rifle Regiment (Colonel Sikorskii, Grigorii Andreevich)... The troops who participated in the liberation of Lvov, by the order of the Supreme High Command of 27 July 1944, and a commendation in Moscow, are given a salute of 20 artillery salvoes from 224 guns.

On August 10 the 264th Rifle Regiment would also be rewarded for its role in the Lviv battles with the Order of the Red Banner. Sambir was captured on August 7 and the 332nd Rifle Regiment (Lt. Colonel Chiposhvili, Aleksandr Yasonovich) was granted its name as an honorific.

== Into the Carpathians ==
In September and October the division took part in the East Carpathian Offensive, particularly in the area of the Dukla Pass. During August it had been transferred to 101st Corps before returning to 67th Corps in September; during October it became part of 76th Rifle Corps but returned to the 67st Corps in November when 38th Army was itself transferred to 4th Ukrainian Front. The Army would remain in this Front for the duration of the war.

Fighting died down until the start of the Western Carpathian Offensive on January 12, 1945. Three days earlier Colonel Andrienko had left the 241st, being replaced by Maj. Gen. Stanislav Antonovich Ivanovskii. This officer had served primarily in the training establishment to this time, although he had briefly led the 31st Rifle Division. 38th Army attacked following a heavy artillery preparation with the 101st and 67th Corps and by January 15 had broken through the XI SS Army Corps and began advancing westward. Four days later, two of the division's regiments were awarded honorifics:

GORLICE... 264th Rifle Regiment (Lt. Colonel Bogach, Ivan Markovich)... 1010th Artillery Regiment (Major Skobelev, Iosif Dmitrievich)... The troops who participated in the capture of Jasło and Gorlice, by the order of the Supreme High Command of 19 January 1945, and a commendation in Moscow, are given a salute of 20 artillery salvoes from 224 guns.

Within days the division made its final transfer, to the 52nd Rifle Corps. On February 19 the 318th Rifle Regiment would be awarded the Order of the Red Star for its role in the fighting for Košice and other towns and cities.

The Moravia–Ostrava Offensive began on March 10 and during the course of the operation the 241st was rewarded for its part in the capture of Bielsko with its first collective decoration on April 5; unusually, it was the Order of the Red Star, which was normally awarded to formations smaller than divisions. In the same set of awards the 1010th Artillery Regiment received the Order of the Red Banner. On April 25 General Ivanovskii was hospitalized, and he was replaced for the last weeks of the war by Col. Valentin Apollinarovich Vrutskii. The division ended the war near Prague.

== Postwar ==
On May 28 the subunits of the 241st received additional decorations for their part in the liberation of Moravská Ostrava. The 332nd Rifle and the 1010th Artillery Regiments were both awarded the Order of Suvorov, 3rd Degree, the 318th Regiment won the Order of Kutuzov, 3rd Degree, while the 264th Regiment was given the Order of Alexander Nevsky. According to STAVKA Order No. 11097 of May 29, part 8, the 241st is listed as one of the rifle divisions to be "disbanded in place". It was finally disbanded in July.
