= Tampere camp =

Concentration camp in Finland during 1918

Coordinates: 61.495166°N 23.798018°E

- Concentration camp
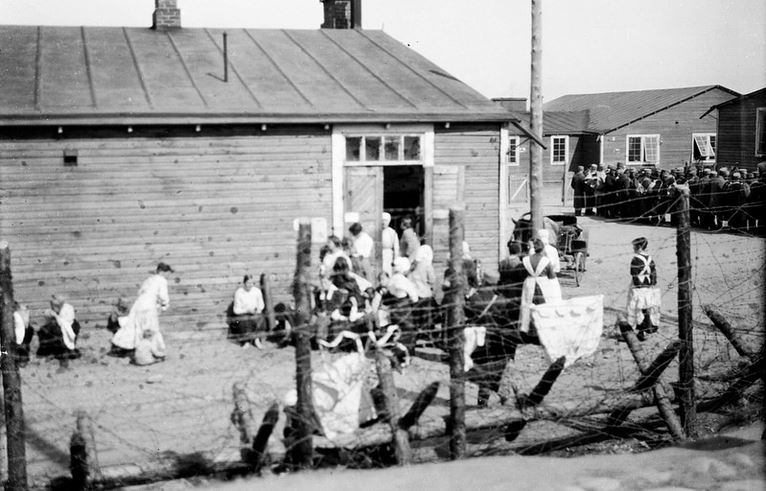
- Women of the Tampere camp
- Location: Tampere, Finland
- Operated by: Finnish Whites
- Operational: 6 April 1918 – 15 September 1918
- Inmates: Finnish Reds
- Number of inmates: ca. 10,000
- Killed: 1,200–1,400
- Notable inmates: Juho Peura †, Akseli Anttila, Lauri Saari, Vilho Itkonen †, Jussi Hietanen, Emil Skog, Kalle Mikkolainen

Tampere camp (also Kalevankangas camp) was a concentration camp operating from 6 April 1918 to 15 September 1918 in the Kaleva district of Tampere, Finland. It was set up for the Reds captured by the White Army after the Finnish Civil War Battle of Tampere.

== History ==
Tampere camp was established on 6 April 1918 to house the approximately 11,000 Red Guard members who had been captured after the Battle of Tampere. Hundreds of Reds were executed right after the capitulation but as the number of prisoners increased, the Whites decided to set up a concentration camp at the site of the former Russian Army garrison in the Kalevankangas heath. The captured Reds were first gathered in the Central Square and then marched to the camp located 2 kilometres east of the town. Some of the prisoners were first held at local schools and other public buildings, by the end of May they were all transported to the Tampere camp. The camp was composed of 21 military barracks and several other buildings. The area was surrounded by barbed wire and guarded with machine guns.

Tampere camp was run by the Finnish Army until 15 September 1918 when it was turned into a forced labor camp under the jurisdiction of the National Prison Agency and most of the prisoners were released to await their trial. The camp was finally closed in early 1919 and the remaining prisoners moved to the Tammisaari prison camp.

The total number of prisoners in the Tampere camp is estimated at 10,000. The number was at its highest at the end of June when there were about 7,700 prisoners. Detainees included hundreds of women and up to 80 children. 1,200–1,400 died as a result of executions, disease, and malnutrition. The youngest victim was the 9-year-old boy Wilho Kuusijärvi, who was shot in May.

== Memorial ==
The victims were buried in a mass grave at the nearby Kalevankangas Cemetery. The total number of bodies in the grave is approximately 2,700, including the Red Guard fighters killed in the Battle of Tampere. The memorial was erected in 1941. It is a work of the sculptor Jussi Hietanen who was detained in the Tampere camp at the age of 15.

== See also ==
- Finnish Civil War prison camps
