= Kalle Mikkolainen =

Finnish artistic gymnast

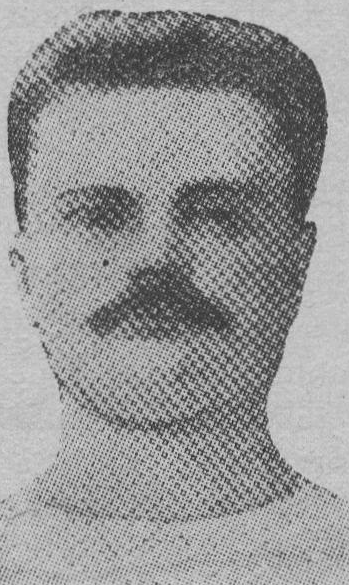
- Mikkolainen c. 1936

Personal information
- Full name: Kaarle Edvard "Kalle" Mikkolainen
- Born: 9 January 1883 Ylöjärvi, Grand Duchy of Finland, Russian Empire
- Died: 28 March 1928 (aged 45) Tampere, Finland
- Relatives: Reijo Mikkolainen (great grandson)

Gymnastics career
- Discipline: Men's artistic gymnastics
- Country represented: Finland
- Club: Tampereen Pyrintö
Medal record
Men's artistic gymnastics
Representing Finland
Olympic Games
Bronze medal – third place	1908 London	Team

Kaarle Edvard "Kalle" Mikkolainen (9 January 1883 – 28 March 1928) was a Finnish gymnast who won bronze in the 1908 Summer Olympics.

== Gymnastics career ==
Kalle Mikkolainen at the Olympic Games
Games	Event	Rank	Notes
1908 Summer Olympics	Men's team	3rd	Source:

== Post-gymnastics career ==
He was a board member of Tampereen Pyrintö in 1909–1910.

He fought for the Red Guard in the Finnish Civil War and was a prisoner of war at the Tampere camp.

== Personal life ==
Olympic silver medalist Reijo Mikkolainen is his great-grandson.
