= Juho Peura =

Finnish carpenter and politician (1879-1918)

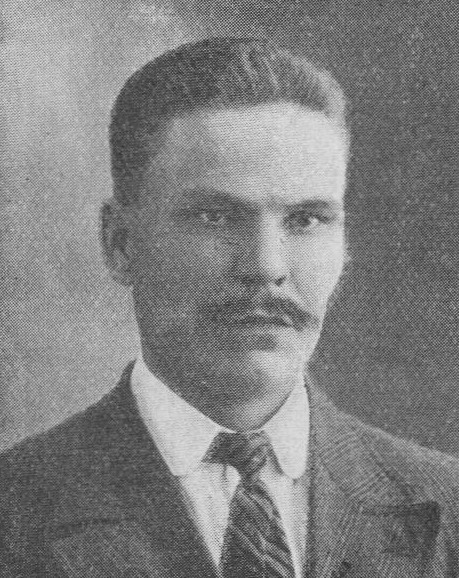

Johan (Juho) Peura (24 May 1879, Laukaa – 26 May 1918, Tampere) was a Finnish carpenter and politician. He was a member of the Parliament of Finland from 1913 to 1916, representing the Social Democratic Party of Finland (SDP). During the Finnish Civil War, he sided with the Reds and served as the president of the Revolutionary Tribunal of Tampere, for which he was imprisoned after the Battle of Tampere on 6 April 1918. He died of pneumonia in the Tampere camp the following month.
