= Akseli Anttila =

Finnish-born Soviet military leader (1897–1953)

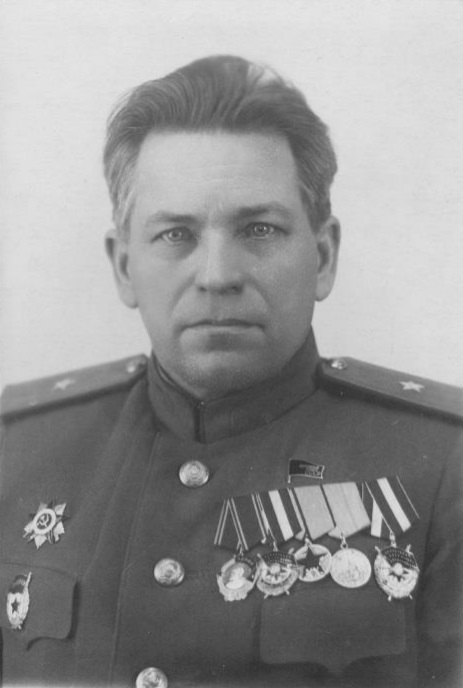
- Born: March 26, 1897; Ruovesi, Grand Duchy of Finland
- Died: March 11, 1953 (aged 55) Moscow, Soviet Union
- Allegiance: Red Finland; Soviet Union (Second Spanish Republic) Spanish Republic; Finnish Democratic Republic
- Service years: 1918–1945
- Rank: Major general
- Conflicts: Finnish Civil War; Russian Civil War; Spanish Civil War; World War II

Akseli Anttila (Russian: А́ксель Моисее́вич А́нттила; March 26, 1897 – March 11, 1953) was a Finnish-born Soviet major general of the Red Army.

== Life ==
Akseli Anttila was born to a family of peasants in Ruovesi. After graduating from an agricultural college, Anttila worked in the railroads. He fought for the Red Guards in the 1918 Finnish Civil War and was captured by the Whites after the Battle of Tampere in 6 April in Pispala. Anttila was detained at the Tampere camp but managed to escape in August. He fled to Sweden and moved to the Soviet Russia in 1919. Anttila joined the exile Communist Party of Finland in Saint Petersburg and took an officer course in the international class of the Bolshevik military academy. He fought in the Russian Civil War, took part of the repression of the 1921 Kronstadt rebellion and was wounded in East Karelia in January 1922.

After working as a teacher in the Bolshevik military academy, Anttila joined the Frunze Military Academy in 1930 and graduated 1933. He served in the Red Army in Karelia and was a military advisor in the Spanish Civil War in 1936–1939. He also served as a colonel in the staff of the general Dmitry Pavlov who commanded a brigade of Soviet tanks. Anttila was wounded in the Madrid Front and was promoted to the rank of brigadier commander equivalent to the rank of brigadier general.

In late August 1939 he moved from the post of deputy commander of the 25th Chapayev Rifle Division to command of the newly-formed 147th Rifle Division at Lubny. As the Winter War broke out in November, Anttila was the commander of the Finnish People's Army and was nominated the Minister of Defense of the Finnish Democratic Republic. In June 1940 he was promoted to major general. 1941–1942 he served in the Western Front and the until 1944 in the Karelian Front. September 1944 Anttila returned the Western Front and took part of the Battle of Berlin under the command of the field marshal Georgy Zhukov. Anttila resigned in November 1945 due to health problems. He died in Moscow in 1953.
