= Ivan Chernyakhovsky =

Soviet military commander

Ivan Danilovich Chernyakhovsky
- Иван Данилович Черняховский
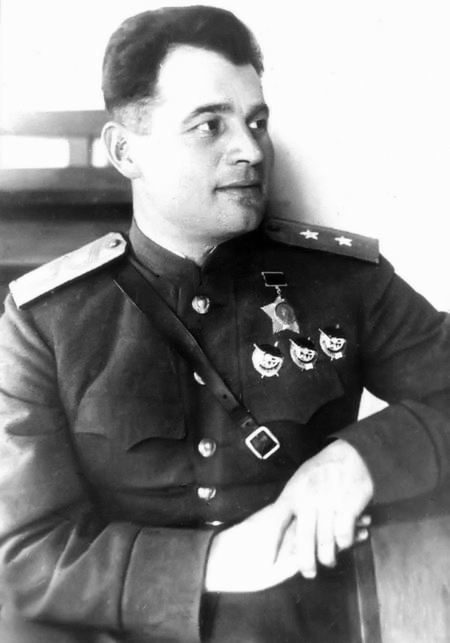
- Chernyakhovsky in 1943
- Born: 29 June [O.S. 16 June] 1907; Oksanino, Umansky Uyezd, Kiev Governorate, Russian Empire (today in Cherkasy Oblast, Ukraine)
- Died: 18 February 1945 (aged 37); Mehlsack, East Prussia, Nazi Germany (present-day Pieniężno, Poland)
- Military career
- Allegiance: Soviet Union
- Branch: Red Army
- Service years: 1924–1945
- Rank: Army General
- Commands: 28th Tank Division; 241st Rifle Division; 18th Tank Corps; 60th Army; 3rd Belorussian Front
- Conflicts: World War II (DOW)
- Awards: Hero of the Soviet Union (twice)

Ivan Danilovich Chernyakhovsky (Russian: Иван Данилович Черняховский; Ukrainian: Іван Данилович Черняховський; 29 June [O.S. 16 June] 1907 – 18 February 1945) was the youngest-ever Soviet General of the army. For his leadership during World War II he was awarded the title Hero of the Soviet Union twice. He died from wounds received outside Königsberg at age 37 while in command of the 3rd Belorussian Front.

== Early life ==
Ivan Chernyakhovsky was born on 29 June 1907 in Oksanino, Russian Empire (now Uman Raion, Cherkasy Oblast, Ukraine). His father was a railwayman who died of typhus when his son was nine. He was a railway worker until joining the Red Army in 1924. In 1928 he finished the officer school in Kiev. Due to the rapid pre-war expansion of the military and 1937–1938 military purges, he quickly rose in rank. In 1938 he became commander of the 9th Light Tank Brigade. In March 1941 he became the commander of the 28th Tank Division in the Baltic Military District.

== World War II ==
Chernyakhovsky left the 28th Tank Division in late August, but returned to the division on 13 December after it had been converted to the 241st Rifle Division. In June 1942 he was promoted to commander of the 18th Tank Corps defending Voronezh, and only a month later assumed command of the 60th Army.

=== Battle of Kursk ===
On 8 February 1943, elements of Chernyakhovsky's 60th Army hoisted a victorious Red Banner over the city of Kursk after a fast advance to the city from Voronezh, which was retaken some two weeks before.

=== Battles for Belarus ===
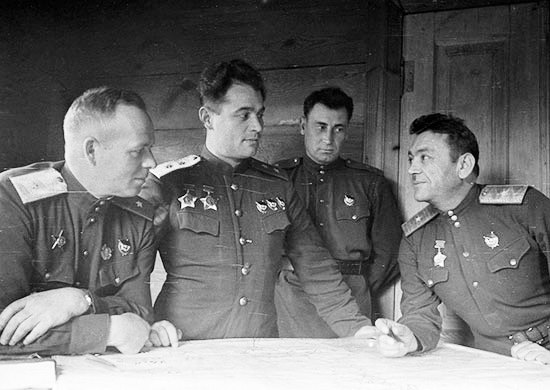
Chernyakhovsky and other members of his military council on the eve of the Battle of the Dnieper, 1943

Operation Bagration was launched after a four-month break in activities because of the spring thaw. The Soviets launched their attack on June 22 on four fronts with 146 infantry and 43 armored division. General Bagramyan's 1st Baltic Front and General Chernyakhovsky's 3rd Belorussian Front struck to the north and south of Vitebsk and took the city on June 27. Chernyakhovsky's left wing then took Orsha – this meant that the Moscow–Minsk highway could now be used to threaten the German rear. To the south, General Zakharov's 2nd Belorussian Front, north of the Pripet Marshes, destroyed a force of 70,000 at Babruysk on that day. Chernyakhovsky's army now headed for Minsk. On July 2 his mobile forces reached Stolbtsy within pre-war borders of Poland, 40 miles away. General Rotmistrov's tanks entered Minsk on 3 July and by 10 July, twenty-five of Army Group Centre’s thirty-three divisions were encircled.

The offensive pressed on to Baranavichy (8 July) and to Grodno (13 July). In the south Konstantin Rokossovsky cleared the Pripet Marshes taking Pinsk and Kovel on 5 July. In the north Bagramyan turned to the Baltic States and took Vilnius in Lithuania and Daugavpils in Latvia on 13 July. This split the Army Group North in two (East Prussia and the Baltic States). The Soviets arrived on the current Polish border within 24 days and, after 68 days, claimed to have taken 158,000 men, 2,000 tanks, 10,000 guns, and 57,000 motor vehicles. They also claimed to have killed 381,000 Germans. It was a colossal defeat for the Germans and Hitler dismissed Busch from the command of Army Group Centre, replacing him with Model. The Soviets had swept the Germans from Belorussia by mid-July 1944 and they pressed their advantage by attacking Poland. In the north Generals Chernyakhovsky and Zakharov joined to take Białystok on 18 July.

=== Arrest of Polish anti-Nazi German resistance in Vilnius ===
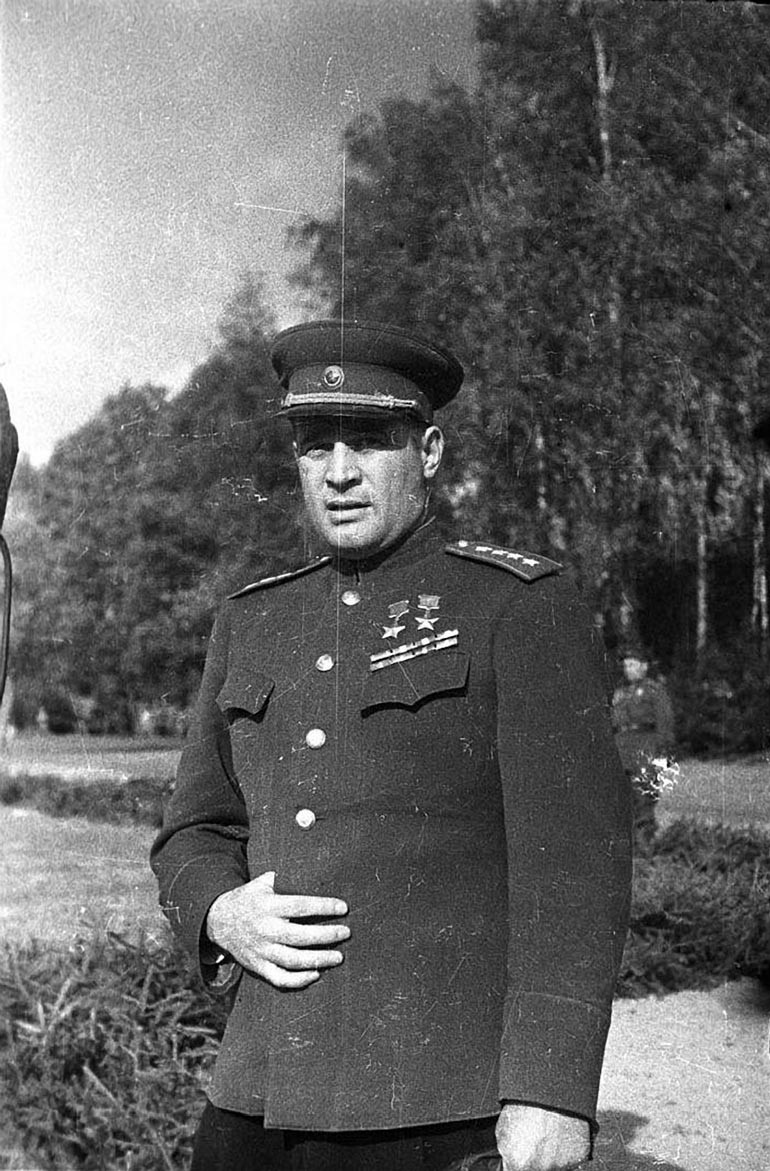
Chernyakhovsky in 1944

On 17 July 1944, as part of a covert operation aimed at disarming Armia Krajowa (AK), Chernyakhovsky, along with the General Ivan Serov, sent by the NKVD, held talks with the leadership of the Wilno Branch of the AK. Under the false pretenses of discussing the further fight against the Germans, Polish resistance officers were invited to a briefing in the headquarters of the Belarusian People's Front. The meeting was attended by Polish resistance officers Lieutenant Colonel Aleksander Krzyżanowski, nom de guerre "Wolf", and the Chief of Staff Major Teodor Cetys, codename "Fame". Both were immediately disarmed and arrested. On the same day in the village of Bogusze, a similar meeting was announced to brief commanders of other Polish partisan units in the presence of both Krzyżanowski and Chernyakhovsky. However, the 'briefing' ended with the disarming and arrest of the Polish officers by the NKVD. In this period, up to 8,000 Polish resistance fighters were arrested. They were either press-ganged into the Soviet Army, sent to the Gulag, or executed.

=== In Germany ===
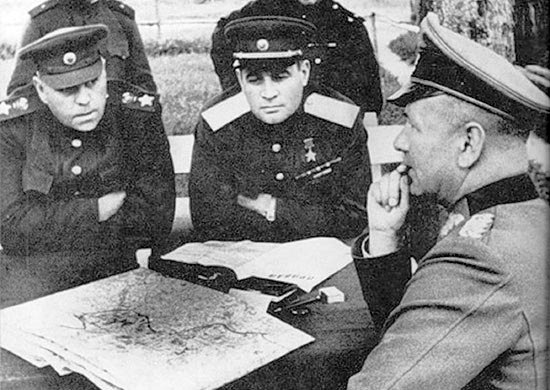
Marshal Aleksandr Vasilevsky and Chernyakhovsky interrogate captured Lieutenant General Alfons Hitter in Germany, 1944

In summer 1944 Chernyakhovsky pressed the Germans on the frontiers of their own land in East Prussia. His 3rd Belorussian Front drove across the Neman River, taking Kaunas on 1 August, and pressed the eastern border of East Prussia. The center thrust took Suwalki on July 26 and General Bagramyan occupied the Tukums junction on the Gulf of Riga.

Prior to his death in 1945, Chernyakhovsky launched the Soviet East Prussian Offensive against stiff resistance from the 3rd Panzer Army. He was part of the drive on Berlin. Together with Marshal Konstantin Rokossovsky's 2nd Belorussian Front, which attacked East Prussia from the south and then headed north-westwards towards the Baltic coast around Danzig (Gdańsk), the 3rd Belorussian Front, commanded by General Chernyakhovsky was ordered to attack from the east towards Königsberg, even though this meant throwing his armies against heavy German defence works. These two fronts mustered 1,670,000 men with 28,360 guns and heavy mortars and 3,300 tanks.

Marshal Rokossovsky's front made contact with Marshal Zhukov's forces at Grudziądz (German: Graudenz) and they wheeled north towards Danzig to cut off East Prussia. More than 500,000 Germans were caught in a pocket, but many were evacuated. On 10 February, Rokossovsky reached the coast near Elbing (Elbląg) and East Prussia was under siege from the south and east by the 3rd Byelorussian Front. From January 1945 until his death, he served as the Soviet Supreme Commander of East Prussia.

On 1 February Chernyakhovsky split the pocket by attacking between Elbing and Königsberg. Just over two weeks later, on 18 February he was killed by shrapnel from artillery fire while inspecting preparations for an offensive.

== Legacy ==
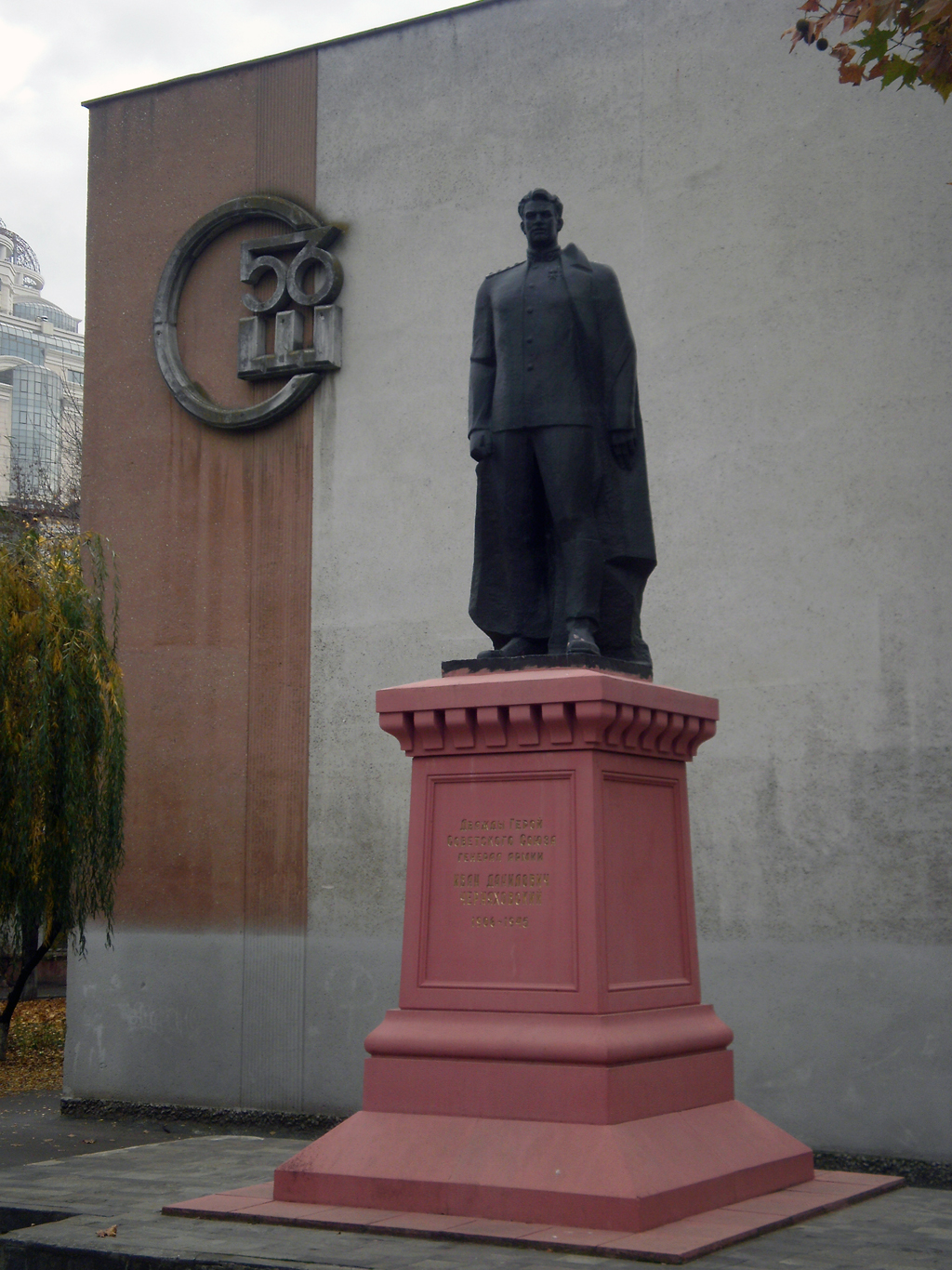
Monument of Ivan Chernyakhovsky in Odessa

Chernyakhovsky was buried in Vilnius, Lithuania, near a square named in his honor. After Lithuania declared its independence from the Soviet Union in 1990 and following the dissolution of the Soviet Union itself in 1991, Chernyakhovsky's remains were reburied at the Novodevichy Cemetery in Moscow in 1992. A monument to Chernyakhovsky, dismantled by the authorities of Vilnius, was reinstated in the Russian city of Voronezh that was defended in the fall of 1942 and liberated in January 1943 by the 60th Army under his command. The Green Bridge was named after him from 1952-1990.

After World War II, due to the Potsdam Agreement, the Soviet Union annexed northern East Prussia and expelled the Germans, the town of Insterburg was renamed Chernyakhovsk, in his honor.

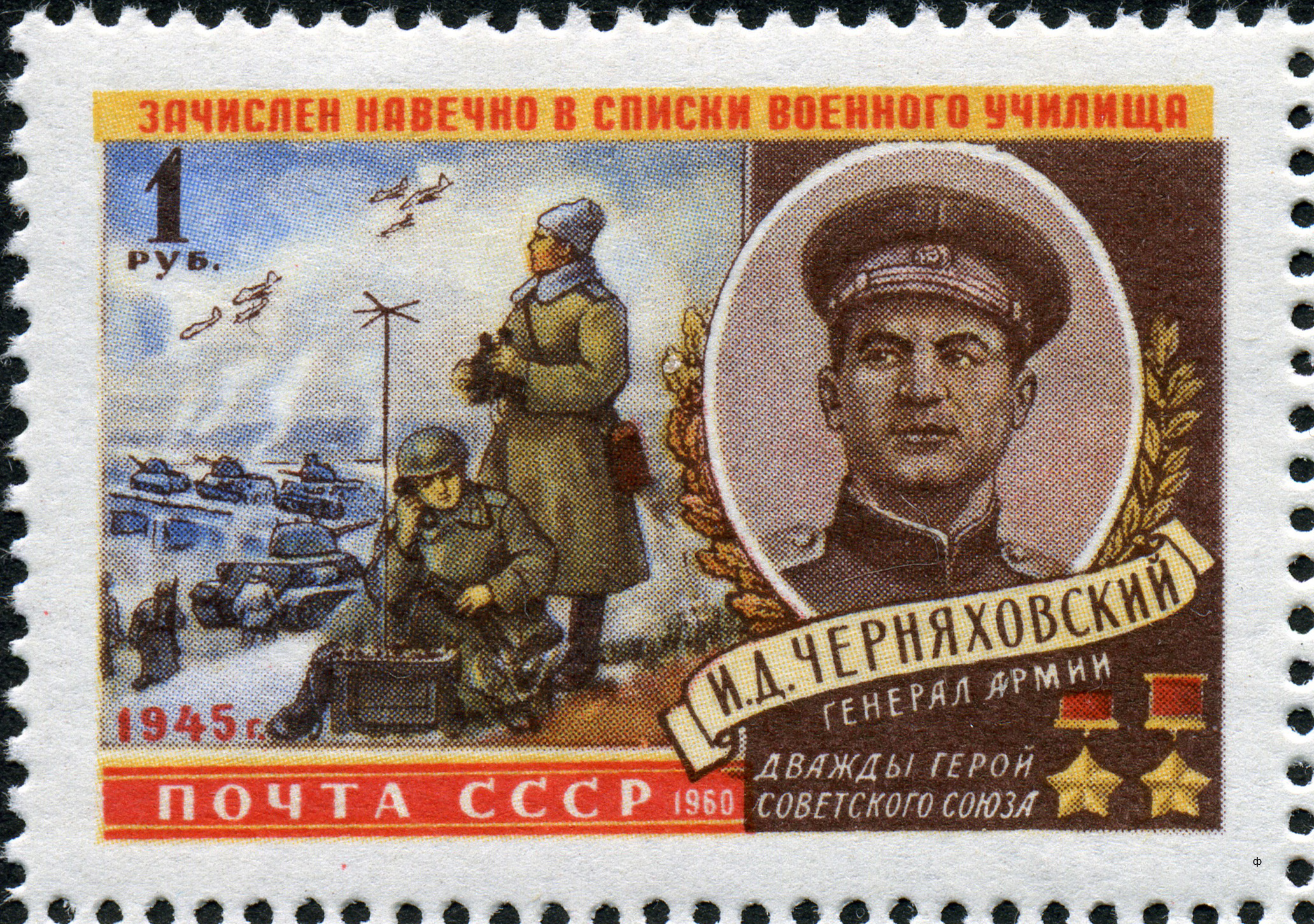
Soviet 1960 commemorative stamp of Ivan Chernyakhovsky

In September 2015, a statue of Chernyakhovsky erected after the war in Pieniężno, Poland (former German name: Mehlsack), near where he was killed, was removed by local Polish authorities, prompting protests from the Russian government. From 2013 to 2023, the National Defense University of Ukraine was named in his honor.

== Dates of rank ==
- Senior Lieutenant (1936)
- Captain (1937)
- Major (1938)
- Lieutenant Colonel (1939)
- Colonel (1941)
- Major General (5 May 1942)
- Lieutenant General (14 February 1943)
- Colonel General (March 1944)
- General of the Army (26 June 1944)

== Awards ==
- Twice Hero of the Soviet Union (17 October 1943 and 29 July 1944)
- Order of Lenin (17 October 1943)
- Order of the Red Banner, four times (16 January 1942, 3 May 1942, 4 February 1943, and 3 November 1944)
- Two Orders of Suvorov 1st class (8 February 1943 and 11 September 1943)
- Order of Kutuzov 1st class (29 May 1944)
- Order of Bogdan Khmelnitsky 1st class (10 January 1944)
- Legion of Merit (USA)
