= Lyapichev =

Lyapichev Ляпичев
- Khutor
- Location within Volgograd Oblast Location within Russia
- Coordinates: 48°29′N 43°29′E
- Country: Russia
- Region: Volgograd Oblast
- District: Kalachyovsky District
- Time zone: UTC+4:00

Lyapichev (Russian: Ляпичев) is a rural locality (a khutor) and the administrative center of Lyapichevskoye Rural Settlement, Kalachyovsky District, Volgograd Oblast, Russia. The population was 1,266 as of 2010. There are 22 streets.

== Geography ==
Lyapichev is located 60 km south of Kalach-na-Donu (the district's administrative centre) by road. Donskoy is the nearest rural locality.
