= Kyrykivka =

Rural locality in Sumy Oblast, Ukraine

Kyrykivka Кириківка
- Rural settlement
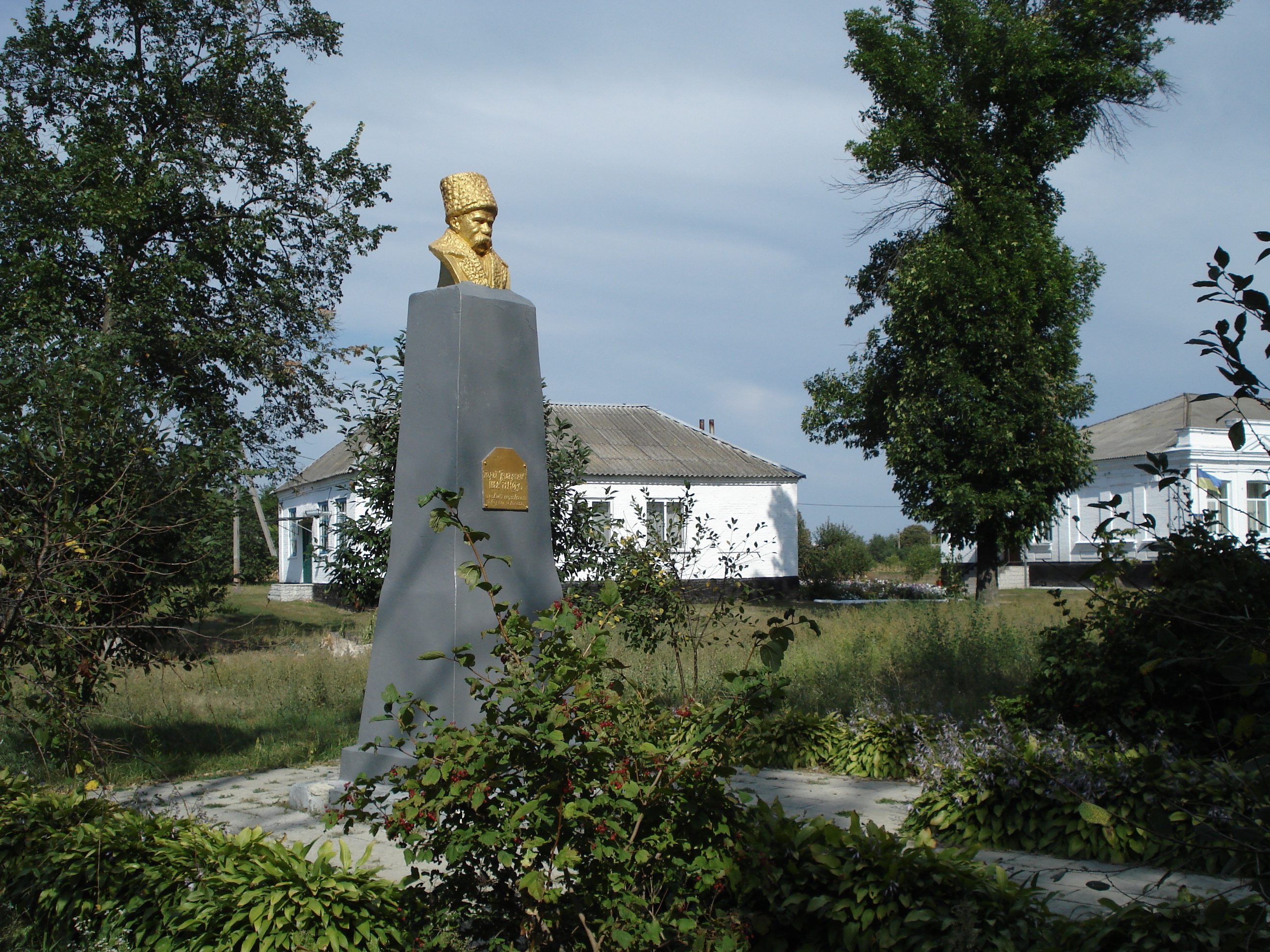

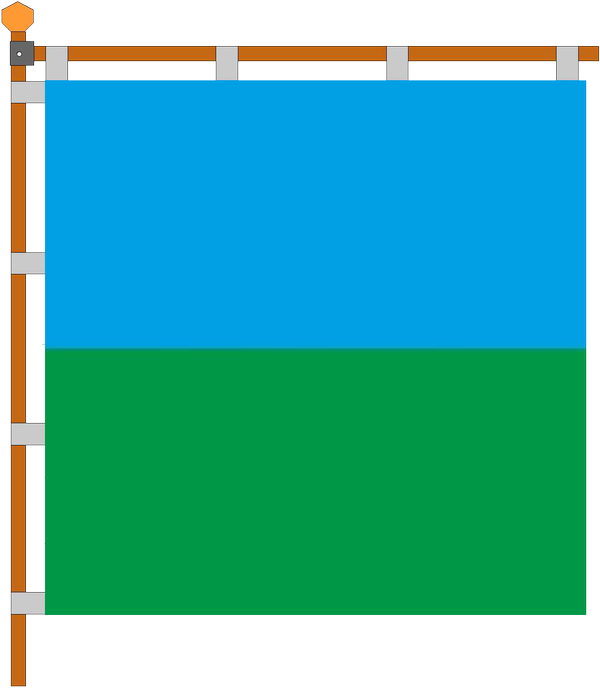
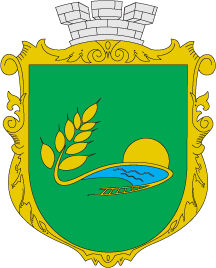
- Flag Coat of arms

- Location in Sumy Oblast Location in Ukraine
- Country: Ukraine
- Oblast: Sumy Oblast
- Raion: Okhtyrka Raion
- Hromada: Kyrykivka settlement hromada

Population (2022)
  - Total: 2,601
- Time zone: UTC+2 (EET)
  - Summer (DST): UTC+3 (EEST)

Kyrykivka (Ukrainian: Кириківка; Russian: Кириковка) is a rural settlement in Okhtyrka Raion, Sumy Oblast, Ukraine. It is located on the left bank of the Vorskla, a left tributary of the Dnieper. Kyrykivka hosts the administration of Kyrykivka settlement hromada, one of the hromadas of Ukraine. Population: 2,601 (2022 estimate).

== History ==
During the Ukrainian War of Independence, from 1917 to 1920, it passed between various factions. Afterwards it was administratively part of the Kharkiv Governorate of Ukraine.

Until 18 July 2020, Kyrykivka belonged to Velyka Pysarivka Raion. The raion was abolished in July 2020 as part of the administrative reform of Ukraine, which reduced the number of raions of Sumy Oblast to five. The area of Velyka Pysarivka Raion was merged into Okhtyrka Raion.

Until 26 January 2024, Kyrykivka was designated urban-type settlement. On this day, a new law entered into force which abolished this status, and Kyrykivka became a rural settlement.

== Economy ==
=== Transportation ===
Kyrykivka railway station is on the railway connecting Vorozhba with Kharkiv via Sumy. There is also a branch line to Okhtyrka. There is passenger traffic through the station.

The settlement is connected by road with Okhtyrka and Velyka Pysarivka, where it has further access to Kharkiv and Sumy.
