= Ivanovskaya Lisitsa =

Ivanovskaya Lisitsa Ивановская Лисица
- Selo
- Interactive map of Ivanovskaya Lisitsa
- Location within Belgorod Oblast Location within Russia
- Coordinates: 50°35′N 35°42′E
- Country: Russia
- Region: Belgorod Oblast
- District: Grayvoronsky District
- Time zone: UTC+3:00

Ivanovskaya Lisitsa (Russian: Ивановская Лисица) is a rural locality (a selo) and the administrative center of Ivano-Lisichanskoye Rural Settlement, Grayvoronsky District, Belgorod Oblast, Russia. The population was 841 as of 2010. There are 7 streets.

== Geography ==
Ivanovskaya Lisitsa is located 29 km north of Grayvoron (the district's administrative centre) by road. Kazachya Lisitsa is the nearest rural locality.
