= 255th Infantry Division =

- German: 255. Infanterie-Division
- Active: 26 Aug 1939 – 2 Nov 1943 (255th Infantry Division); 2 Nov 1943 – Feb 1944 (Division Group 255)
- Country: Nazi Germany
- Branch: Heer (Wehrmacht)
- Type: Infantry
- Size: Division
- Nickname: "Green Dot division"
- Engagements: Battle of France; German-Soviet War; Battle of Moscow; Third Battle of Kharkov; Operation Citadel; Battle of the Korsun-Cherkassy Pocket

Commanders
- Notable commanders: Wilhelm Wetzel; Walter Poppe

The 255th Infantry Division (German: 255. Infanterie-Division) was an infantry division of the German Heer during World War II.

== History ==
The 255th Infantry Division was formed on 26 August 1939, the day of German mobilization, as part of the fourth Aufstellungswelle in Döbeln in Wehrkreis VI (Dresden). The initial commander of the 255th Infantry Division was Wilhelm Wetzel, who assumed his post on 26 August 1939.

The division spent the first months of the war in the Protectorate of Bohemia and Moravia, until it was called to the Battle of France in April 1940. After German victory in that campaign, the 255th Infantry Division was on occupation duty in Belgium in June, in the Nantes region between July and August, and in the Bordeaux sector between September 1940 and February 1941.

In March 1941, the 255th Infantry Division was called to occupied Poland in preparation for Operation Barbarossa. The division crossed into the Soviet Union in June and subsequently fought at Brest, Pinsk, Gomel, Smolensk, and Vyazma. At the end of the year, the division assisted in the defense against the Soviet winter campaign of 1941–42.

On 12 January 1942, the 255th Infantry Division changed commanders for the only time in its history, with Walter Poppe replacing Wetzel. Poppe would hold his command post until the dissolution of the division. In early 1942, the division fought in the Gzhatsk sector before a transfer to the southern part of the Eastern Front after Germany's February 1943 defeat at the Battle of Stalingrad. It fought in the Third Battle of Kharkov and Operation Citadel. In August 1943, the 255th Infantry Division absorbed the survivors of the battered 332nd Infantry Division.

On 2 November 1943, the 255th Infantry Division was formally downgraded to a Kampfgruppe strength formation, dubbed Division Group 255, as a result of the large casualties sustained. In February 1944, Division Group 255 was trapped in the Korsun–Cherkassy Pocket and subsequently destroyed.

The division was known by the nickname Green Dot division due to its divisional insignia, which showed a green dot on a white square.

== Superior formations ==
Organizational chart of the 255th Infantry Division
Year	Month	Army Corps	Army	Army Group	Area
1939	September – December	In the Protectorate.			
1940	January – April	In the Protectorate.			
1940	May	Army reserves.	6th Army	Army Group B	Netherlands
1940	June	Army Group reserves.		Army Group B	Belgium
1940	July – August	VI	4th Army	Army Group B	Nantes
1940	September – October	VI	7th Army	Army Group C	Bordeaux
1940	November – December	VI	7th Army	Army Group D	Bordeaux
1941	January – February	VI	7th Army	Army Group D	Bordeaux
1941	March	Army reserves.	17th Army	Army Group B	General Government
1941	April	IX	17th Army	Army Group B	General Government
1941	May	XXXXIV	4th Army	Army Group B	General Government
1941	June	XXIV	2nd Panzer Army	Army Group Center	Brest
1941	July	LIII	2nd Panzer Army	Army Group Center	Pinsk
1941	August	LIII	2nd Army	Army Group Center	Gomel
1941	September	VIII	9th Army	Army Group Center	Smolensk
1941	October	XXVII	9th Army	Army Group Center	Vyazma
1941	November	Army reserves.	9th Army	Army Group Center	Mozhaysk
1941	December	Army Group reserves.		Army Group Center	Moscow
1942	January	VII	4th Panzer Army	Army Group Center	Mozhaysk
1942	February – April	XX	4th Panzer Army	Army Group Center	Gzhatsk
1942	May – December	XX	3rd Panzer Army	Army Group Center	Gzhatsk
1943	January	XX	3rd Panzer Army	Army Group Center	Gzhatsk
1943	February	XX	4th Army	Army Group Center	Gzhatsk
1943	March	VII	2nd Army	Army Group Center	Sumy
1943	April	LII	Army Detachment Kempf	Army Group South	Kharkiv
1943	May – June	LII	Army Detachment Kharkiv	Army Group South	Kharkiv
1943	July – August	LII	4th Panzer Army	Army Group South	Belgorod
1943	September	XXIV	4th Panzer Army	Army Group South	Dnieper
1943	October	XXXXVIII	8th Army	Army Group South	Dnieper
1943	November	XXIV	4th Panzer Army	Army Group South	Dnieper (Kiev)
1943	December	Downgraded to Division Group 255.			
1944	January – February	Downgraded to Division Group 255.			

== Noteworthy individuals ==
- Wilhelm Wetzel, divisional commander between August 1939 and January 1942.
- Walter Poppe, divisional commander between January 1942 and February 1944.
