= 245th Rifle Division =

245th Rifle Division (June 26, 1941 – July 1945)
- Active: 1941–1945
- Country: Soviet Union
- Branch: Red Army
- Type: Division
- Role: Infantry
- Engagements: Leningrad strategic defensive Staraya Russa offensive operation Demyansk Pocket; Battle of Demyansk (1943); Staraya-Russa Offensive (1943); Pustoshka-Idritsa Offensive; Idritsa-Opochka Offensive; Leningrad–Novgorod offensive Pskov-Ostrov Offensive; Baltic offensive Riga offensive (1944); Vistula-Oder offensive Upper Silesian offensive Prague offensive
- Decorations: Order of the Red Banner
- Battle honours: Valga; Rēzekne

Commanders
- Notable commanders: Kombrig Vladislav Vikentyevich Korchits; Maj. Gen. Fyodor Petrovich Ozerov; Col. Vasilii Adamovich Senkevich; Col. Konstantin Timofeevich Ilyin; Maj. Gen. Sergei Nikolaevich Aleksandrov; Maj. Gen. Vladimir Arkadevich Rodionov

The 245th Rifle Division was formed in the Moscow Military District as a reserve infantry division of the Red Army just days after the German invasion of the USSR. It was based on the shtat (table of organization and equipment) of April 5, 1941 with modifications due to the emergency. Initially assigned to 29th Army in Reserve Front it was soon reassigned to 34th Army in Northwestern Front and took part in the fighting around Staraya Russa in mid-August before retreating eastward, where it was involved in the dismal battles around Demyansk through 1942 and into early 1943. After the German II Army Corps evacuated the Demyansk salient in February the division advanced with 34th Army back to Staraya Russa, planning to take it by storm, but this effort failed and the 245th was again faced with siege warfare that continued into October when it was moved west to join the 22nd Army and soon after the 3rd Shock Army in the fighting west of Nevel. Following a brief period for restoration in the Reserve of the Supreme High Command it was reassigned to 42nd Army in the last stages of the Leningrad–Novgorod offensive and served along the east shores of Lake Peipus during the spring of 1944. When the summer offensive into the Baltic states began the 245th was part of 3rd Baltic Front and advanced through Latvia and Estonia under several commands, winning a battle honor in the process. After the liberation of Riga in mid-October the Front was disbanded and the much-depleted division was available for deployment elsewhere. Prior to the invasion of Poland and Germany it was transferred to the 59th Army of 1st Ukrainian Front, where it took over the men, materiel, and battle honor of the 379th Rifle Division. In January 1945 it took part in the Vistula-Oder Offensive as part of 115th Rifle Corps, and later in the Lower and Upper Silesian Offensives. During the latter it was distinguished for its part in the capture of the Upper Silesian Coal Basin with the Order of the Red Banner, while two of its rifle regiments received decorations for their part in the fighting near Oppeln. The 245th ended the war near Prague; it would be disbanded during the summer.

== Formation ==
The 245th began forming on June 26 at Vyshny Volochyok in the Kalinin Oblast. Once formed the division had the following order of battle:

- 898th Rifle Regiment
- 901st Rifle Regiment
- 904th Rifle Regiment
- 770th Artillery Regiment
- 773rd Howitzer Artillery Regiment (until September 10, 1941)
- 301st Antitank Battalion
- 322nd Reconnaissance Company
- 411th Sapper Battalion
- 663rd Signal Battalion (later 584th Signal Company)
- 276th Medical/Sanitation Battalion
- 241st Chemical Defense (Anti-gas) Company
- 310th Auto Transport Company (later 501st Motor Transport Battalion)
- 37th Field Bakery (later 258th)
- 90th Divisional Veterinary Hospital Later 368th)
- 3814th Field Postal Station (later 671st, 920th)
- 314th Field Office of the State Bank

The division came under the command of Kombrig Vladislav Vikentyevich Korchits on the day it began forming. As suggested by his obsolete rank this officer had been arrested and imprisoned in May 1938 during the Great Purge, but was released and rehabilitated in January 1940 and then served as an instructor at the Frunze Military Academy. As of July 10 the division was still forming up in the Moscow Military District, but three days later it was assigned to 29th Army in Reserve Front and was marching on Bologoye. Before the end of the month it was reassigned to 34th Army in the same Front, and it would remain in this Army until October 1943.

== Defense of Leningrad ==
On August 6 the 245th was reassigned, with 34th Army, to Northwestern Front. Three days later the German X Army Corps of 16th Army seized Staraya Russa, a vital transportation hub in a nearly roadless region. This left a 48km-wide gap between it and the II Army Corps at Kholm. In response to an overambitious plan proposed by Lt. Gen. N. F. Vatutin, the chief of staff of the Front, the STAVKA issued orders late that day:

3. The 34th Army will occupy jumping-off positions in the Kulakovo and Kolomna sector along the eastern bank of the Lovat River by the evening of 11 August...
4. Conduct your main attack with the 34th Army and a simultaneous attack by the 11th Army's left flank in the direction of Vzgliady and the 48th Army along the Utorgosh and Peski axis. The 34th Army will deploy one rifle division behind its right flank to protect the junction between 11th and 34th Armies and the 181st Rifle Division behind the junction of the 34th and 27th Armies.
The offensive by all armies will begin on the morning of 12 August.

In the event, this plan was partly preempted when X Corps attacked toward Novgorod on August 10, disrupting the 11th and 48th Armies' attacks.

34th Army, spearheaded by the 202nd and 163rd Motorized Rifle Divisions, which were now in 34th Army, joined the 25th Cavalry Division in a lunge that pushed 40km westward through the German defensive cordon and reached the Staraya Russa–Dno rail line early on August 14. This determined assault enveloped X Corps in Staraya Russa, separated it from II Army Corps on its right flank and threatened the rear of the main German panzer force advancing on Novgorod. The situation was restored by August 22 through the intervention of the LVI Motorized Corps and three days later the 34th and 11th Armies had been driven back to the line of the Lovat. Although suffering heavy losses (from August 10-28 34th Army suffered 60 percent casualties in personnel, 89 percent losses in tanks and 58 percent in other vehicles) the operation delayed Army Group North's drive on Leningrad for another 10 days which may have been decisive in keeping the city in Soviet hands.

Although the 245th survived this first battle, on August 28 Kombrig Korchits left his command and was replaced by Col. Vasilii Nikolaevich Nichushkin. Korchits took over the 182nd Rifle Division in January 1942, and then served as deputy commander of 34th Army beginning in August, when his rank was modernized to major general. He later served as chief of staff of 1st Shock Army until he was transferred to the Polish Armed Forces in the East in May 1944. He later filled many senior positions in the Polish military and government before returning to the USSR and retiring in 1954. Nichushkin held the position for just three weeks before he was replaced by Col. Fyodor Petrovich Ozerov, who had been serving as chief of staff of 34th Army; he was promoted to major general on October 7.

== Battles for Demyansk ==
Following the Staraya Russa fighting the commander of Army Group North, Field Marshal W. J. F. von Leeb, resolved to ensure that his right flank was secure before beginning the final push on Leningrad. Constant Soviet attacks from the Valdai Hills region enticed 16th Army to keep pushing farther eastward. Given the losses the 34th Army had suffered and the priority for Soviet reinforcements on the Moscow and Leningrad axes there was little it could do to stop this advance, although the 11th and 27th Armies held firm on the flanks. Demyansk was taken in early September, but by now the LVI Motorized Corps was in an absurd position at the end of a single 90km-long dirt road through swamps back to the railhead at Staraya Russa.

LVI Motorized was soon withdrawn in preparation for the renewed offensive on Moscow, and was replaced by II Corps. As winter began to arrive in October the 16th Army's offensive came to a halt and a period of stalemate settled over the area. Once the German efforts to take Leningrad and Moscow were defeated the STAVKA began planning a general offensive to begin on January 10, 1942. 34th Army was now under command of Maj. Gen. N. E. Berzarin and was deployed in the central sector of the Front. It was tasked with encircling and destroying the German forces in Demyansk. Berzarin formed two division-sized shock groups to support the efforts of 11th and 3rd Shock Armies but otherwise to fix as much of German 16th Army in place as possible with diversionary attacks. The first shock group was based on the 254th Rifle Division which faced the weakened 290th Infantry Division. Beginning on January 10 the 254th infiltrated the positions of the 290th with ski troops through frozen marshes and cut the supplies of three company-sized strongpoints which were gradually eliminated by the rest of Berzarin's forces.

At the beginning of February, the 290th Infantry was still holding east of the Pola River but its II Corps and several other German units were vulnerable to encirclement at Demyansk. The bridge at Davidovo over the Redya River was the target for 11th Army's 1st Guards Rifle Corps and was taken on February 5, after which the Corps reached the village of Ramushevo on the Lovat three days later, cutting the last road to Demyansk. The 290th was virtually surrounded with Soviet ski troops operating freely in its rear. To avoid annihilation it was permitted to pull back south from the Pola. On February 25 the full encirclement of II Corps was completed. The STAVKA ordered that Northwestern Front should crush the pocketed force within four or five days; meanwhile reinforcements were arriving from Germany and the airlifting of supplies was well underway.

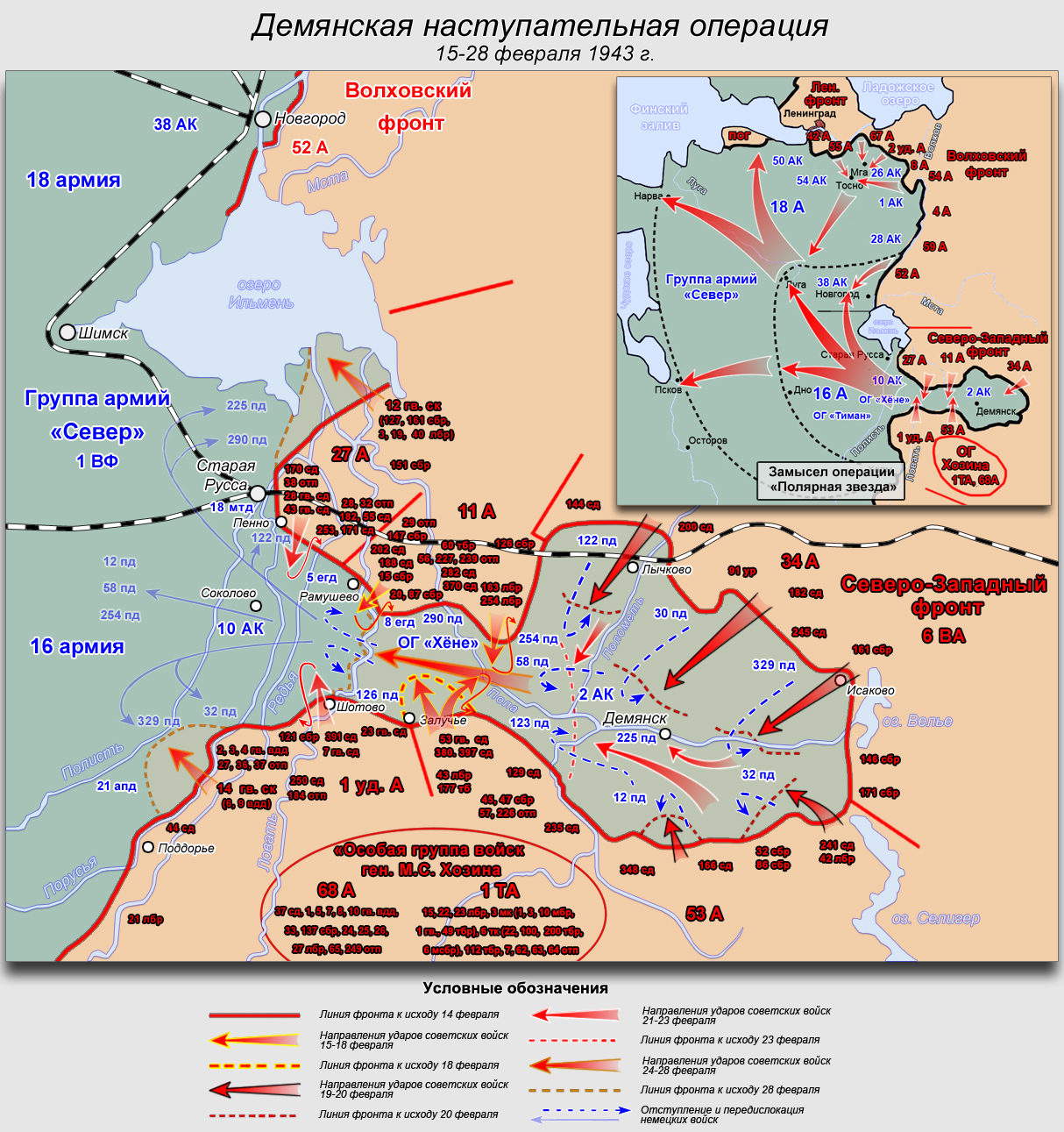
Soviet positions at Demyansk, spring 1943. The 245th was in the 34th Army sector northeast of Demyansk.

The German attempt to relieve the pocket, Operation Brückenschlag, began on March 21 but the linkup with the besieged grouping was not achieved until April 21. The so-called "Ramushevo corridor" was less than 4km wide and often under Soviet artillery fire so II Corps was still heavily dependent on air supply. During this period, on April 2 General Ozerov left the 245th; he was soon given command of 27th Army and would be promoted to the rank of lieutenant general in September 1943, ending the war in command of 50th Army. He was replaced by Col. Vasilii Adamovich Senkevich who had previously served as deputy commander of the 188th Rifle Division. From May to October Northwestern Front made several attempts to sever the corridor. German engineers turned the area into a fortified zone, complete with deep barbed wire obstacles and extensive minefields. 11th Army was on the north side of the corridor while 1st Shock Army held the south side; 34th and 53rd Armies covered the remainder of the salient. On October 26 Colonel Senkevich left the division to attend the Voroshilov Academy; he would later serve in a variety of staff appointments. He was replaced by Col. Konstantin Timofeevich Ilyin, who had previously led the 1st formation of the 422nd Rifle Division and its successor, the 397th Rifle Division.

=== Operation Polyarnaya Zvezda ===
The commander of Northwestern Front, Marshal S. K. Timoshenko, submitted yet another plan to liquidate the salient to the STAVKA on January 14, 1943. In a departure from the previous plans which focused on cutting the corridor, Timoshenko proposed to lead with shock groups from the 34th and 53rd Armies "in order to deprive the enemy of the opportunity to maneuver his forces." The 34th's shock group was to consist of the 245th and 175th Rifle Divisions, 161st Rifle Brigade, 60th Tank Brigade, and artillery support. The overall plan was approved on January 17, but before it could be carried out it was preempted by Marshal G. K. Zhukov's larger plan, Operation Polyarnaya Zvezda, for the destruction of Army Group North and the liberation of the entire Leningrad region.

Unbeknown to the Soviet command, on January 31 the German High Command ordered that the Demyansk salient be evacuated, in the wake of the encirclement and upcoming destruction of 6th Army at Stalingrad. The division had been earmarked for Northwestern Front's part in Polyarnaya Zvezda, which began on February 15, but made only marginal gains against the 329th Infantry Division. Operation Ziethen began on February 17; 34th Army attempted to harass the withdrawing forces, primarily with ski troops, but the German withdrawal freed up the reserves they needed to reinforce their lines along the Lovat, and the "pursuit" through the devastated landscape achieved little.

== Into Western Russia ==
On March 20 Colonel Ilyin in turn departed for the Voroshilov Academy, but died of a severe illness on July 25. The new commander of the 245th was Maj. Gen. Sergei Nikolaevich Aleksandrov, who had gained his rank while leading the 23rd Guards Rifle Division. On March 18 the 34th Army, along with forces recently reassigned from 27th Army, had attempted to take Staraya Russa by storm but had run into strong German forces just released from the salient. A further effort on March 20 had little more success and the two sides settled down to a siege through the spring and summer, broken only by a further unsuccessful attack on August 17-20. In October the 245th finally left the Army and the Front when it was reassigned to 22nd Army in 2nd Baltic Front.

=== Pustoshka-Idritsa Offensive ===
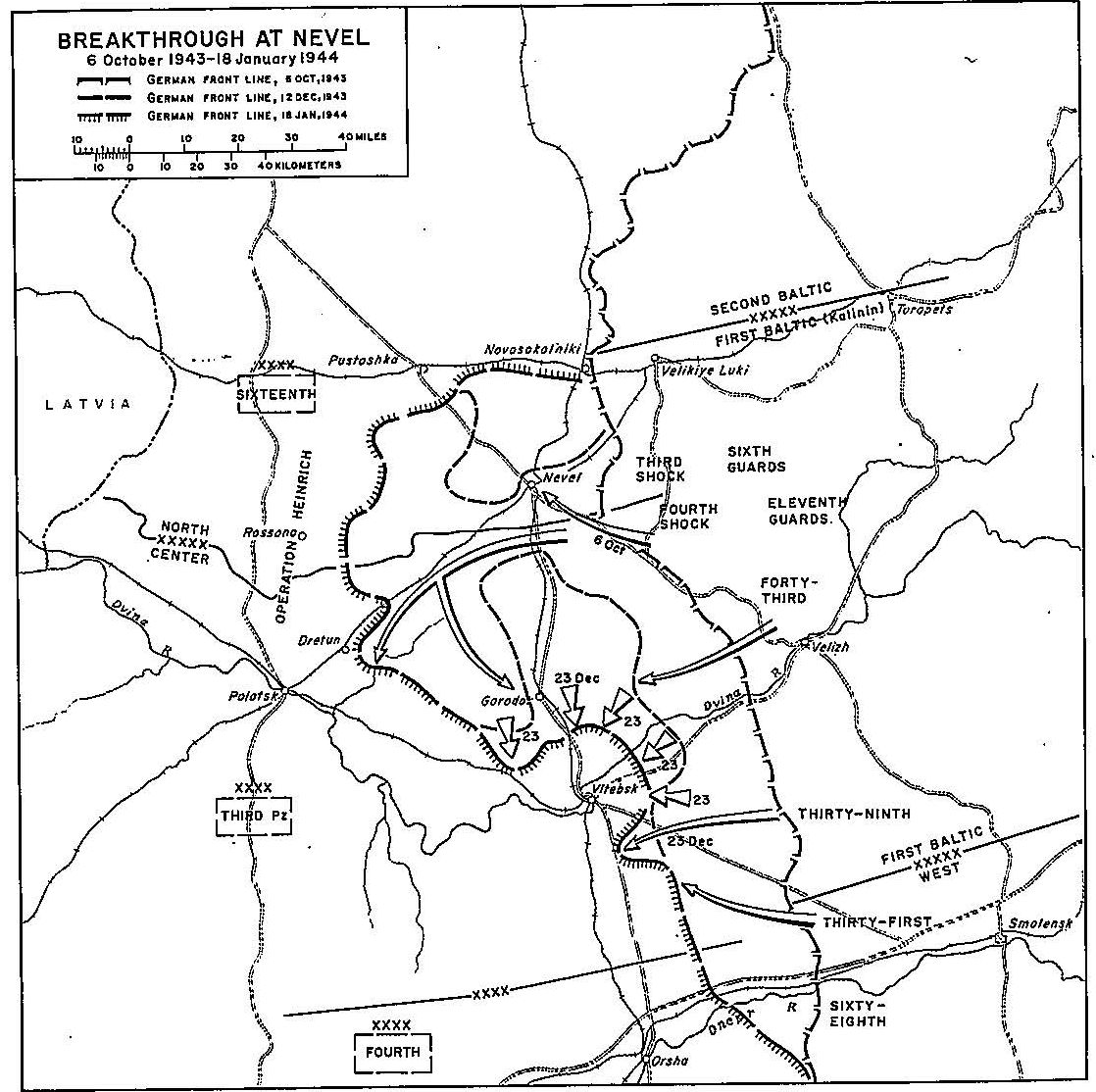
Map of Battle of Nevel (October 1943 - January 1944)

On October 6 the 3rd and 4th Shock Armies had scored a surprise victory and liberated the town of Nevel. By November 2 the 1st Baltic Front was prepared to resume the offensive westward from the Nevel salient. The Front commander, Army Gen. A. I. Yeryomenko, had thoroughly reorganized 3rd Shock, replacing divisions worn down in the Nevel offensive with relatively fresh ones. Shortly after the offensive began the Army was further reinforced with the 245th, 219th and 119th Guards Rifle Divisions. The plan of the offensive called for "the defeat of enemy forces along the line of the Nevel'-Polotsk railroad..., the deep envelopment of the grouping of fascist forces defending west of Nevel' from the south and southwest, and the destruction of the group in cooperation with 6th Guards Army."

The assault force smashed through the 16th Army's defenses almost immediately and then turned the right flank of the I Army Corps' 58th Infantry Division. The entire force then pivoted northward and headed deep into the German rear toward the objective of Pustoshka on the Velikiye Luki–Riga railroad line. As they pushed deeper the Army commander, Lt. Gen. K. N. Galitskii, committed the 245th, 115th and 146th Rifle Divisions (soon organized as the 100th Rifle Corps) into the penetration on the shock group's right flank. Subsequently, the lead elements of 3rd Shock Army drove more than 30km deep along a 40km-wide front by November 7, although German forces still clung to positions along the flank of the 15-20km-wide corridor through which the Soviet force had attacked.

After this success the offensive slowed. An effort by 6th Guards Army to lop off the salient separating it from 3rd Shock made almost no progress and that Army went over to the defense on November 15. About a week later 3rd Shock made several futile efforts to break through the German defenses east of Pustoshka but made only minimal gains and on November 21 the entire Front was ordered over to the defensive.

=== Idritsa-Opochka Offensive ===
Under orders from the STAVKA on December 9 the 2nd Baltic Front planned a new effort through Pustoshka toward the town of Idritsa in late December, to begin on the 16th. At this time the 100th Corps had five rifle divisions under command, including the 245th and was defending the western half of the northern protrusion of the salient south of Pustoshka. 3rd Shock was facing two divisions of VIII Army Corps and two of the I Army Corps. In the event the attack was handily repulsed by the defenders after several days. Later that month the 245th was reassigned to 90th Rifle Corps, still in 3rd Shock Army.

2nd Baltic planned a new offensive to clear the salient south of Novosokolniki in early January 1944. However this was preempted beginning on December 29 when Field Marshal G. von Küchler, commander of Army Group North, began a phased withdrawal which took place over six days. This caught the Soviets by surprise and while 3rd Shock and 6th Guards Army hastily organized a pursuit this did nothing but harass the retreating Germans. Later in the month the 245th was moved to the Reserve of the Supreme High Command for a much needed period of replenishment and rebuilding. When it returned to the front in February it was assigned to the 98th Rifle Corps of 42nd Army in Leningrad Front. Under these commands it took part in the final phase of the Leningrad-Novgorod Offensive, and spent the spring involved in minor fighting along the east shore of Lake Peipus. On March 12 General Aleksandrov was seriously wounded and evacuated, being replaced by Col. Garif Ziyatdinovich Uldashev until April 4 when he returned to duty. On May 22 he exchanged commands with Col. Vladimir Arkadevich Rodionov, the commander of the 13th Rifle Division, also in 42nd Army. Aleksandrov would lead the 13th into the postwar, while Rodionov would command the 245th for the duration as well and be promoted to the rank of major general on September 13. In March the division had been reassigned to 118th Rifle Corps, still in 42nd Army, and in April the Army and the Corps moved to 3rd Baltic Front.

== Baltic Offensives ==
At the start of the Pskov-Ostrov Offensive in early July the 245th was located northeast of Pskov, facing the defenses of the Panther Line around that city. After the breakthrough of those defenses the division was moved to the 7th Rifle Corps of 54th Army in the same Front. At the beginning of August it was located near Abrene near the border of Latvia. During that month it was reassigned again, now to the 12th Guards Rifle Corps of 1st Shock Army. By mid-month it had advanced to Ape, on the border of Estonia. Continuing its advance into Estonia the division won a battle honor:

VALGA - ...245th Rifle Division (Major General Rodionov, Vladimir Arkadevich)... The troops who participated in the liberation of Valga, by the order of the Supreme High Command of 19 September 1944, and a commendation in Moscow, are given a salute of 12 artillery salvoes from 124 guns.

By this time the division was in the 119th Rifle Corps of 1st Shock Army. In the first week of October the division had reached the area northeast of Limbaži as it closed in on Riga. The fighting through the Baltic states had been a steady and exhausting drain on Soviet units, and on October 10, when the 898th Rifle Regiment made a river crossing near Riga the entire regiment could only put two under-strength rifle companies into the assault, about 20 percent of its authorized strength. The Latvian capital was liberated on October 13 and the 770th Artillery Regiment (Maj. Tertishnikov, Sergei Fyodorovich) was awarded its name as an honorific.

== Into Germany ==
According to a directive issued by the STAVKA to the commander of 1st Ukrainian Front, Marshal I. S. Konev, on November 26, he was to receive the 59th Army as a reinforcement, along with:

... the 245th and 379th rifle divisions, which, upon their arrival are to be reformed into a single rifle division and included within the 59th Army. A directive on the reforming will be issued separately.

The Army and the two divisions were to arrive between December 13-30 in the Lubaczów–Surochów area. As the senior of the two divisions the 245th received the forces of the 379th, as well as its battle honor for Rēzekne, and the 379th ceased to exist on January 1, 1945. In the same month the 245th was assigned to the 115th Rifle Corps; it would remain under these commands for the duration of the war.

=== Vistula-Oder Offensive ===
1st Ukrainian Front began its offensive from the Baranów bridgehead over the Vistula River at 0435 hours on January 12, and quickly achieved a breakthrough. The 245th was part of the Soviet force that liberated Kraków on January 18 and the 898th Rifle Regiment (Lt. Col. Konstantin Dmitrievich Nikolayev) was awarded its name as a battle honor. On February 19 the 901st Regiment would be awarded the Order of Suvorov, 3rd Degree, for its part in the same fighting. As the advance continued the division took part in the liberation of Katowice on January 27, and three days later staged a crossing of the Oder River to the west. For these accomplishments General Rodionov would be made a Hero of the Soviet Union on April 6. On April 10, eight soldiers of the division were also awarded the Gold Star for the crossing operation, including Sen. Sgt. Fakhrutdin Rakhmatgalievich Ablyazov, who was a pre-war veteran and had been wounded six times during the war.

=== Upper Silesian Offensive ===
Konev completed his Lower Silesian Offensive by February 24, after which he began laying plans for a new offensive into upper Silesia. Upon the arrival of his Front's main group of forces in the Neisse area the 59th and 60th Armies were to develop the attack from the bridgehead north of Ratibor to the west and southwest. Ultimately this operation would encircle and destroy the German group of forces in the Oppeln salient. The commander of 59th Army, Lt. Gen. I. T. Korovnikov, chose to launch his main attack along the left flank with the forces of 115th and 93rd Rifle Corps and 7th Guards Mechanized Corps in the general direction of Kostenthal and Zultz. At this time the personnel strength of the Army's divisions varied from 4,366 to 6,690 men and women. The commander of 115th Corps, Maj. Gen. S. B. Kozachek, placed his 92nd and 135th Rifle Divisions in first echelon with the 245th in second echelon. The Corps was to launch its main attack along the left flank in the direction of Lenschutz, Oberglogau, Repsch and Wiesengrund and break through the German defense along a 3km-wide sector and by day's end capture the line Nesselwitz–Groenweide in cooperation with 7th Guards Mechanized.

The offensive on the 59th and 60th Army's sector began at 0850 hours on March 15 following an 80-minute artillery preparation, and went largely according to plan although more slowly than expected. The main German defense zone was broken through on a 12km front and the Armies advanced 6-8km during the day. Bad weather prevented air support before noon, and the advancing forces also had to repel ten counterattacks. In response Konev ordered that the advance continue through the night. During the day on March 16 the 59th Army managed to advance another 3-9km, and the 93rd Corps and 7th Guards Mechanized Corps cleared the entire depth of the German defenses and set the stage for the success of the attack over the next two days. By the end of March 17 these two Corps had reached the line Tomas–Schenau–Kittledorf while the 115th covered against flank attacks from the north. The slow advance of the Corps over the latter half of March 16 and all of March 17 was later blamed on General Kozachek who exaggerated the strength of German resistance, failed to make sufficient demands on his subordinates, allowed the artillery to lag behind, and failed to continue attacking through the night. Konev personally visited the 59th Army headquarters on the 17th and directed that the 115th be deployed to the northwest to capture Oberglogau and facilitate the advance of the 93rd and 7th Guards Corps. To do so he ordered the 245th to be committed from second echelon; by the end of March 18 the Corps was to link up with 21st Army in the Elgut area. During that day 59th Army's offensive unfolded more successfully. The encirclement of the German Oppeln grouping was completed and the divisions of 115th Corps had to repel numerous counterattacks by small subunits of infantry and tanks trying to break out to the south from Oberglogau and Friedersdorf, after which it seized Walzen and reached the southern outskirts of the other two towns. The encircled forces consisted of the 20th SS, 168th and 344th Infantry Divisions, part of the 18th SS Panzergrenadier Division, and several independent regiments and battalions.

With the encirclement completed the 115th Corps was tasked with preventing the encircled grouping from breaking out to the south, while the 135th and 245th Divisions attacked to clear Oberglogau and reach the line Kreenbusch–Rosenberg. This was assisted by most of 7th Guards Mechanized and 93rd Rifle Corps. The German command was now making efforts to pull its encircled forces out toward the west, including a break-in attempt by the Hermann Göring Panzer Division towards Steinau. At 0830 hours on March 19, after a 10-minute fire onslaught, the 115th Corps attacked, splitting the defenders and capturing Krappitz and Oberglogau plus several wooded areas. The next day the remnants of the trapped force tried to break out toward Steinau, but were unsuccessful, while the 155th Corps mopped up the Kreenbusch area. Late in the day the 59th Army began regrouping to continue the offensive. The total German casualties in the encirclement battle were 30,000 killed, 15,000 prisoners, 21 aircraft, 57 tanks and assault guns and 464 guns of various calibers. On March 21 the 59th Army resumed its advance in the direction of Jägerndorf which it reached but did not take on March 31. Due to the toll of casualties during the offensive and inadequate supplies of ammunition, the Army was ordered to go over to the defense. On April 26 the 898th and 904th Rifle Regiments would both be awarded the Order of Alexander Nevsky for their roles in the fighting southwest of Oppeln. Prior to this, on April 5 the division as a whole was decorated with the Order of the Red Banner for its part in clearing the Dombrovsky coal region and the southern part of the industrial region of upper Silesia.

== Postwar ==
Beginning on May 6 the division advanced with its Corps and Army in the Prague offensive, and took part in the final encirclement of Army Group Center. When the fighting ended its personnel shared the full title 245th Rifle, Valga-Rēzekne, Order of the Red Banner Division. (Russian: 245-я стрелковая Валгинско-Режицкая Краснознамённая дивизия.) According to STAVKA Order No. 11096 of May 29, 1945, part 8, the 245th is listed as one of the rifle divisions to be "disbanded in place". It was disbanded in accordance with the directive in July 1945.
