= Fyodor Ozerov =

Soviet lieutenant general (1899–1971)

Fyodor Petrovich Ozerov
- Ozerov, c. 1945
- Born: 6 February 1899; Klishino, Lgovsky Uyezd, Kursk Governorate, Russian Empire
- Died: 18 November 1971 (aged 72) Moscow, Soviet Union
- Allegiance: Russian SFSR; Soviet Union
- Branch: Red Army (later Soviet Army)
- Service years: 1918–1954
- Rank: Lieutenant general
- Commands: 27th Army; 50th Army
- Conflicts: Russian Civil War; Polish–Soviet War; World War II
- Awards: Order of Lenin; Order of the Red Banner (2)

Fyodor Petrovich Ozerov (Russian: Фёдор Петро́вич О́зеров; 6 February 1899 – 18 November 1971) was a Soviet Army lieutenant general who held field army command during World War II.

== Early life and Russian Civil War ==
Fyodor Petrovich Ozerov was born on 6 February 1899 in the village of Klishino, Ugonskoy Volost, Lgovsky Uyezd, Kursk Governorate. During the Russian Civil War, Ozerov was conscripted into the Red Army in October 1918 and sent to serve as a Red Army man with the 34th Reserve Rifle Regiment at Bryansk. In December of that year, he was sent to study at the 3rd Moscow Infantry Command Course, and upon graduation in September 1919 was appointed to the 69th Rifle Regiment of the 8th Rifle Division as an instructor for staff duties under a battalion commander. From January to April 1920 he completed the Commanders Refresher Course of the 16th Army of the Western Front, then returned to the regiment to serve as a company and battalion commander. With the 8th Rifle Division of the 16th Army he fought on the Western Front in the battles against Polish troops in the area of Bobruisk and Svisloch. During the Polish–Soviet War, the division fought in the Minsk offensive and the Battle of Warsaw, then retreated into Belorussia. Ozerov was wounded in action near Pruzhany. In late 1920 and 1921 he fought with the division in the suppression of the forces of Stanisław Bułak-Bałachowicz, Pavlovsky, and Korotkevich, among others, in Bobruisky, Mozyrsky, and Igumensky Uyezds.

== Interwar period ==
After the end of the war, Ozerov continued to serve as a company commander in the regiment at Slutsk. From August 1921 to August 1923 he completed the Vystrel course, and after graduation was appointed a company commander at the Kharkov Central Military-Political School. In November 1923 he was transferred to the Kharkov Military-Political School. The school was relocated to Leningrad and disbanded in September 1924, after which Ozerov served in the same post at the Leningrad Military-Topographical School. In March 1926 he transferred to serve as a company commander in the 58th Rifle Regiment of the 20th Rifle Division, and from April 1927 commanded a battalion of the 59th Rifle Regiment of the division. Ozerov completed the preparatory course for admission to the Frunze Military Academy at the Red Army Military-Political Academy between October 1928 and September 1929, then was enrolled as a student in the special department of the Frunze Military Academy.

After graduating from the academy Ozerov served on the staff of the Belorussian Military District from March 1932 as assistant chief of a sector, and from March 1936 as chief of the 3rd section of the 1st department. He was enrolled as a student at the General Staff Academy in October 1936, and after graduating from the 1st course of the academy in 1937 became an adjunct at the academy. In August 1938 he was granted the rights of an academy graduate, relinquishing his position as an instructor. Ozerov was appointed chief of staff of the 2nd Special Rifle Corps in October 1939. Later that year the corps was relocated to Liepāja in Latvia as part of the Soviet contingent garrisoned in the Baltic states after a series of treaties with the Baltic states. Ozerov took command of the 5th Rifle Division of the 16th Rifle Corps of the 11th Army of the Baltic Special Military District in September 1940.

== World War II ==
After Operation Barbarossa began on 22 June 1941, Ozerov led the 5th Rifle Division fought in the Border Battles on the Northwestern Front, fighting in defensive actions west of Kaunas. After unsuccessful attempts to stop the German advance, the division fell back on Vilnius, where it was encircled. Ozerov organized the breakout of the division from the encirclement on 26 June. For his "successful management of elements of the division, personal courage while organizing the breakout from encirclement, and skillful leadership of elements on the march in the absence of technical methods of communication and under pressure from the encirclement and continuous enemy air attack," Ozerov was awarded the Order of the Red Banner on 31 August.

In late August, Ozerov was appointed chief of staff of the 34th Army of the front. He was dismissed on 24 September and appointed commander of the 898th Rifle Regiment of the 245th Rifle Division for "failure to support a planned combat operation." He took command of the division on 2 October, and was promoted to major general on 7 October. From January to March 1942 it fought in the encirclement of the Demyansk Pocket as part of the 34th Army. Ozerov became commandant of Fortified District No. 90 of the front in March 1942 and was appointed commander of the 27th Army in May. He led the army while it defended a sector in the area of Staraya Russa and in the elimination of the Demyansk salient. Ozerov was relieved of command on 29 January 1943 due to the "insufficient readiness of the army troops" for the offensive and placed at the disposal of the People's Commissariat of Defense while awaiting reassignment.

Ozerov was included in the group of officers under Marshal of the Soviet Union Georgy Zhukov in April, and helped organize the defense of the Kursk Bulge, inspecting the armies reinforcing the front. From June he served as general for assignments of special importance under Marshal of the Soviet Union Semyon Timoshenko, then in July was appointed chief of staff of the Volkhov Front. He was promoted to lieutenant general on 25 September. For his "skillful supervision of staff work" during the Leningrad–Novgorod offensive, Ozerov was awarded the Order of Kutuzov, 1st class, on 21 February 1944. In March, after the disbandment of the Volkhov Front, Ozerov was appointed chief of staff of the 18th Army of the 1st Ukrainian Front. In this role, he participated in the destruction of German forces in Right-bank Ukraine, the Proskurov–Chernovitsy Offensive, and the Lvov–Sandomierz offensive. In these actions the army crossed the Southern Bug and entered the Carpathians. For his "active participation in the planning and execution of the operations of the army," Ozerov was awarded the Order of Bogdan Khmelnitsky, 1st class, on 29 May.

Ozerov transferred to serve as chief of staff of the 50th Army of the 2nd Belorussian Front in September 1944, distinguishing himself in the preparation of the East Prussian offensive to eliminate the German forces in East Prussia. He took command of the army on 2 February 1945 when army commander Colonel General Ivan Boldin was relieved. The army became part of the 3rd Belorussian Front on 11 February, and on 17 February captured Wormditt, then from 6 to 9 April fought in the storming of the city during the Battle of Königsberg. For his planning of the East Prussian Offensive, Ozerov received the Order of Suvorov, 1st class. He simultaneously served as chief of the Königsberg garrison from April 1945.

== Postwar ==
After the end of the war, Ozerov served as chief of staff of the Smolensk Military District from July 1945. He was assigned to the faculty of the Voroshilov Higher Military Academy (the renamed General Staff Academy) in July 1946, serving as deputy chief of the large unit tactics department. He became chief of the department in April 1948, and retired due to illness in January 1954. Ozerov died on 18 November 1971 in Moscow.

== Awards ==
Ozerov was a recipient of the following awards and decorations:

- Order of Lenin
- Order of the Red Banner (2)
- Order of Suvorov, 1st class
- Order of Kutuzov, 1st class
- Order of Bogdan Khmelnitsky, 1st class
- Order of Suvorov, 2nd class
- Medals
