= Andrei Getman =

Soviet military commander

Andrei Lavrentyevich Getman
- Андрей Лаврентьевич Гетман
- Born: 5 October 1903; Klepaly, Putivlsky Uyezd, Kursk Governorate, Russian Empire
- Died: 8 April 1987 (aged 83); Moscow, Soviet Union
- Burial place: Novodevichy Cemetery
- Military career
- Allegiance: Soviet Union
- Branch: Soviet Army
- Service years: 1924–1987
- Rank: Army General
- Commands: 6th Tank Corps (became 11th Guards Tank Corps); Armored forces Ural Military District; Armored forces Transcaucasian Military District; Special Mechanized Army; 1st Separate Combined Arms Army; Carpathian Military District
- Conflicts: Soviet–Japanese Border Wars; Battle of Lake Khasan; Battle of Khalkhin Gol; World War II; Battle of Moscow; Battle of Kursk
- Awards: Hero of the Soviet Union

Andrei Lavrentyevich Getman (Russian: Андре́й Лавре́нтьевич Ге́тман; Ukrainian: Андрі́й Лавре́нтійович Ге́тьман, Andriy Lavretiyovych Hetman; 5 October (22 September OS) 1903 – 8 April 1987) was a Soviet military commander, Army General (13 April 1964) and Hero of the Soviet Union (May 7, 1965).

After joining the Red Army in 1924, Getman graduated from the Red Commanders School in 1927 and the Military Academy of Mechanization and Motorization of the Red Army in 1937. Sent to postings in the Transbaikal Military District, he fought at the Battle of Lake Khasan and the Battle of Khalkhin Gol. After Operation Barbarossa, Getman was sent west to command the 112th Tank Division in the defense of Moscow. In April 1942, he became the commander of the 6th Tank Corps, which was converted into the 11th Guards Tank Corps for its actions in the Battle of Kursk. Getman became the deputy commander of the 1st Guards Tank Army in August 1944.

After the war, he was commander of armored tank and mechanized troops of the Transcaucasian Military District and was chief of staff and deputy chief of armored tank and mechanized troops. From 1958 to 1964 he was commander of the troops of the Carpathian Military District. Beginning in June 1964 he was chairman of the Central Committee of the All-Union Voluntary Society for Assistance to the Army, Air Force, and Navy. He was deputy to the fifth through seventh convocations of the Supreme Soviet of the USSR and became a candidate member of the Central Committee of the CPSU in 1961. He was awarded four Orders of Lenin, six Orders of the Red Banner, the Order of Suvorov Second Class, the Order of Bodgan Khmel’nitskii Second Class, the Order of the Red Star, and several foreign orders.

== Early life ==
Andrei Getman was born on 5 October 1903 in Klepaly village of Kursk Governorate to a peasant family. After graduating from a rural school, he worked as a laborer in a sugar factory and at the Vorozhba railway station.

== Military service ==
=== Prewar ===
In October 1924, Getman was drafted into the Red Army. In 1927, he graduated from the Red Commanders school (VUTSIK), after which he became a platoon commander in the 130th Rifle Regiment of the 44th Rifle Division during September. In the same year, he joined the Communist Party of the Soviet Union. He was promoted to become a company commander in the same regiment. In May 1929, Getman became the assistant to the chief of the first department of staff of the division and the head of the Zhitomir House of the Red Army. In March 1930, he became the commander of courses at the Red Commanders School. Between October 1931 and February 1933, Getman was the chief of the regimental school of the Krivoy Rog Rifle Regiment of the Krivoy Rog Territorial Rifle Division. Getman was sent to study at the Military Academy of Mechanization and Motorization of the Red Army in February 1933. He was promoted to Senior lieutenant in 1935. In 1937, he graduated from the Military Academy of Mechanization and Motorization of the Red Army with the rank of Captain.

In June 1937, he became the head of the 5th staff department for the 7th Mechanized Corps of the Transbaikal Military District. In February 1938, Getman became the acting commander and chief of staff of the 31st Mechanized Brigade after being promoted to major. In August, he led the brigade during the Battle of Lake Khasan. During the summer of 1939, he fought in the Battle of Khalkin Gol. During battles for Remizov hill, he reportedly showed skilled leadership ability. In September 1939, Getman became the assistant commander of the 2nd Mechanized Brigade and was promoted to lieutenant colonel on 8 October 1940. He was transferred to command the 45th Separate Light Tank Brigade, being promoted to colonel on 9 December. On 11 March 1941, he was appointed to the command of the 27th Tank Division. Getman became chief of staff for the 30th Mechanized Corps on 26 March.

=== World War II ===
In September, Getman was appointed commander of the 112th Tank Division, which had arrived from the Transbaikal to fight in defense of Moscow. The division distinguished itself during the battle of Moscow and the defeat of German troops near Tula. Elements of the division were active in the area of Serpukhov with the 49th Army and were then assigned to Pavel Belov's group and fought in the defense of Kashira. The division was sent to Kashira, where they fought in conjunction with Belov's 1st Guards Rifle Corps during the counterattack against Heinz Guderian's units. The division was then transferred to support the 50th Army, where German troops had almost surrounded Tula. The division counterattacked the German tank units and linked up with the 999th Rifle Regiment of the 258th Rifle Division, opening up the Tula-Moscow highway. Getman pushed his division forward and defeated German units at the Revyakino station on 7 December, opening the Moscow-Tula railway. On 8 December, the division was officially transferred to the 50th Army and helped capture Yasnaya Polyana. The division became part of 50th Army's mobile group under the command of Vasily Popov. The 112th fought in the raid on Kaluga and helped capture the city on 30 December.

Getman became the commander of the 6th Tank Corps in April 1942. On 30 May, he was promoted to the rank of major general. During the summer, the corps fought in the Battle of Rzhev. He led the corps during the Battle of Kursk in July 1943. Getman was promoted to lieutenant general on 21 August. For its actions at Kursk, the corps became the 11th Guards Tank Corps in October 1943. Getman led the guards brigade during the Zhitomir–Berdichev Offensive, the Korsun-Shevchenkovsky Offensive, the Proskurov-Chernivtsi Offensive and the Lvov–Sandomierz Offensive. In August 1944, he was promoted to deputy commander of the 1st Guards Tank Army. In the position, Getman participated in the Vistula–Oder Offensive, the East Pomeranian Offensive and the Berlin Offensive.

=== Postwar ===
In July 1945, Getman became the deputy commander of the Urals Military District's armored and mechanized forces. A year later, he became the commander of the Urals Military District armored and mechanized forces. Getman transferred in November to command armored and mechanized forces subordinated to the Transcaucasian Military District. In January 1949, he became the chief of staff and deputy commander of Soviet Army armored and mechanized forces. On 3 August 1953, he was promoted to Colonel general. In April 1956, Getman became the commander of the Separate Mechanized Army, which in June 1957 became the 1st Separate Combined Arms Army. He was transferred to command the Carpathian Military District in April 1958. In the same year, he became a deputy of the Supreme Soviet of the Soviet Union at its 5th convocation, and continued to serve as a deputy until after the 8th convocation in 1974. Getman became a candidate member of the CPSU Central Committee in 1961. He was promoted to Army general on 13 April 1964. In June, Getman became the chairman of the DOSAAF central committee. On 7 May 1965, Getman was awarded the title Hero of the Soviet Union and the Order of Lenin on the 20th anniversary of the end of World War II. He developed DOSAAF physical fitness conscript standards and implemented them in 1966. In January 1972, Getman became an inspector with the Group of Inspectors General of the Ministry of Defense, which meant that he was retired from active duty. He lived in Moscow and died on 8 April 1987. Getman was buried in the Novodevichy Cemetery.

== Personal life ==
Getman married Olga Ivanovna, who died in 1972 and worked as a doctor. He had a daughter, Elvina, born in 1932. Getman's son Anatoly was born in 1938 and died in 1967.
