= Nikolai Gusev =

Nikolai Ivanovich Gusev
- Born: 26 November [O.S. 14 November] 1897; Brodnikovo, Maryinskoy volost, Novotorzhsky Uyezd, Tver Governorate, Russian Empire
- Died: 16 May 1962 (aged 64); Moscow, Soviet Union
- Burial place: Novodevichy Cemetery
- Military career
- Allegiance: Russian Empire; Russian SFSR; Soviet Union
- Branch: Imperial Russian Army; Red Army (later Soviet Army)
- Service years: 1916–1918; 1918–1962
- Rank: Colonel general
- Commands: 4th Army; 20th Army; 47th Army; 48th Army; Kazan Military District; 3rd Army; 28th Army; Special Mechanized Army
- Conflicts: World War I; Russian Civil War; World War II
- Awards: Order of Lenin (2); Order of the Red Banner (4); Order of Suvorov, 1st class (2); Order of the Red Star; Order of the Badge of Honor

Nikolai Ivanovich Gusev (Russian: Никола́й Ива́нович Гу́сев; 26 November [O.S. 14 November] 1897 – 16 May 1962) was a Soviet Army colonel general.

Drafted into the Imperial Russian Army during World War I, Gusev did not see action and was drafted into the Red Army during the Russian Civil War. Serving with cavalry units, he ended the latter as a junior commander. During the interwar period, Gusev continued to serve in command and staff positions with cavalry units and by the end of the 1930s, he was an officer of the Red Army General Staff. He commanded the 25th Cavalry Division between July 1941 and January 1942, the 13th Cavalry Corps to June 1942, the 4th Army to November 1943, and successively the 20th, 47th and 48th Armies until the end of the war. Postwar, Gusev successively served as commander of several armies, military attaché to Czechoslovakia, and as head of a directorate of the General Staff before his death in 1962.

== Early life, World War I, and Russian Civil War ==
Gusev was born on 26 November [O.S. 14 November] 1897 in the village of Brodnikovo, Maryinskoy volost, Novotorzhsky Uyezd, Tver Governorate. During World War I, he was mobilized for service in the Imperial Russian Army on 22 May 1916 and sent to the 9th Reserve Cavalry Regiment in Petrograd. After graduating from the regimental training detachment in March 1917, Gusev was sent to the marching squadron of the 3rd Baltic Cavalry Regiment in Taytsy, which he served with as a senior non-commissioned officer (unter-ofitser) until returning to his home area as the army dissolved in February 1918.

During the Russian Civil War, Gusev was mobilized by the Novotorzhsky Uyezd military commissariat of the Red Army on 16 October, serving as a junior commander with the 7th Cavalry Regiment in Rzhev. From March 1919 he served as a starshina with the 1st Northern Cavalry Regiment, fighting on the Eastern Front against the White forces of Alexander Kolchak. In September he was transferred to the 51st Rifle Division, serving as a quartermaster in its separate cavalry battalion, then in the 51st Cavalry Regiment of the division, in which he became chief of the economic detachment of the regiment, a platoon commander, and commander and assistant commander of a squadron. From July 1920 the division fought against the Army of Wrangel and the Revolutionary Insurrectionary Army of Ukraine as part of the Southwestern and Southern Fronts.

== Interwar period ==
After the end of the war, Gusev continued to serve with the regiment as a platoon and squadron commander. When the regiment was reduced to a separate cavalry squadron of the division in December 1922, he became the squadron commander. After graduating from Higher Refresher Courses for senior and mid-level command staff at Kharkov in 1924, he transferred to the 1st Cavalry Division of the Troops in Ukraine and Crimea as acting assistant commander for personnel of its 1st Cavalry Regiment. Gusev became chief of staff of its 2nd Cavalry Regiment in 1926, graduating from the Air Defense Commanders' Improvement Courses at the anti-aircraft artillery school in 1928, and Cavalry Commanders' Improvement Courses at Novocherkassk in 1929. After completing the latter, he became commander and commissar of the 2nd Cavalry Regiment, and in July 1931 was appointed division chief of staff after completing the Cavalry Commanders' Improvement Courses at Novocherkassk again. Transferred to the Staff of the Red Army in January 1935, he served as head of a subunit of the 4th Staff Department. From November 1937, he was secretary of a party bureau, and from September 1939 he was acting military commissar of the Red Army General Staff. Gusev entered the Military Academy of the General Staff in July 1940 and graduated from it in 1941.

== World War II ==
After the beginning of Operation Barbarossa, the German invasion of the Soviet Union in June 1941, Gusev was tasked with the formation of the 25th Cavalry Division in July. The formation of the division was completed by 25 July and on 2 August it concentrated in the area of Demyansk and Molvotitsy, joining the 34th Army of the Northwestern Front. He was promoted to major general on 9 November. From January 1942, Gusev, now a major general, commanded the 13th Cavalry Corps, fighting in the Lyuban Offensive. Despite making a deep advance into the German rear, the corps' attack and that of other units involved was contained. Encircled by a German counterattack, Gusev's corps escaped the Lyuban pocket on 16 May. He became commander of the 4th Army of the Volkhov Front on 26 June, and was promoted to lieutenant general on 25 September. He commanded these units in defensive battles on the approaches to Leningrad, and in attempts to break the siege. From 30 October 1943 he was acting commander of the 20th Army, and commanded the 47th Army from 28 April 1944. He led the army in Operation Bagration as part of the 1st Belorussian Front. During the latter, it captured Kovel, crossed the Western Bug and at the end of the month reached the Vistula in the Warsaw area. On 14 September, after four days of fighting, the army captured Praga, a suburb of Warsaw.

Transferred to command the 48th Army on 15 December, Gusev led it as part of the 2nd Belorussian Front and then the 3rd Belorussian Front from 11 February, which it fought in the East Prussian Offensive. During the offensive, the army reached the Vistula Lagoon (Frisches Haff) on 25 March, fighting in heavy defensive and offensive battles against the German troops on the Baltic coast. On 5 May 1945, Gusev was promoted to colonel general.

== Postwar ==
After the end of the war, Gusev continued to command the 48th Army, withdrawn to the Kazan Military District. After the army headquarters was disbanded, he became district commander in July. A year later, Gusev was sent to the Belorussian Military District to take command of the 3rd Army at Slutsk, then became commander of the 28th Army at Grodno in March 1947. From April 1949 he temporarily served as commander of the Special Mechanized Army in Romania.

Gusev became the chief military advisor to the Ministry of National Defense of Czechoslovakia in July 1950, simultaneously serving as the Soviet military attaché in Czechoslovakia. He transferred to become deputy head of the 10th Directorate of the General Staff in July 1954, and from May 1956 simultaneously served as deputy chief of staff of the Unified Armed Forces of the Warsaw Pact. In October 1958 both positions were combined in title, and in December 1960 Gusev became head of the 10th Directorate. He died in Moscow on 6 May 1962, and was buried at the Novodevichy Cemetery.

== Awards and honors ==
Gusev received the following decorations:

- Order of Lenin (2)
- Order of the Red Banner (4)
- Order of Suvorov, 1st class (2)
- Order of the Red Star
- Order of the Badge of Honor
- Medals
- Foreign orders and medals

He was a delegate to the second and third convocations of the Supreme Soviet of the Soviet Union.

== Notes ==
=== Bibliography ===
- Beloborodov, Afanasy, ed. (1963). Военные кадры Советского государства в Великой Отечественной войне 1941 – 1945 гг [Military Leaders of the Soviet State in the Great Patriotic War 1941–1945] (in Russian). Moscow: Voenizdat.
- Glantz, David M. (2002). The Battle for Leningrad 1941–1944. Lawrence, Kansas: University Press of Kansas. ISBN 0-7006-1208-4.
- Main Personnel Directorate of the Ministry of Defense of the Soviet Union (1964). Командование корпусного и дивизионного звена советских вооруженных сил периода Великой Отечественной войны 1941 – 1945 гг [Commanders of Corps and Divisions in the Great Patriotic War, 1941–1945] (in Russian). Moscow: Frunze Military Academy.
- Tsapayev, D.A.; et al. (2011). Великая Отечественная: Комдивы. Военный биографический словарь [The Great Patriotic War: Division Commanders. Military Biographical Dictionary] (in Russian). Vol. 1. Moscow: Kuchkovo Pole. ISBN 978-5-9950-0189-8.
- Vozhakin, Mikhail Georgievich, ed. (2005). Великая Отечественная. Командармы. Военный биографический словарь [The Great Patriotic War: Army Commanders: Military Biographical Dictionary] (in Russian). Moscow: Kuchkovo Pole. ISBN 5860901135.
