= 370th Rifle Division =

- Active: 1941 – 1945
- Country: Soviet Union
- Branch: Red Army
- Type: Division
- Role: Infantry
- Engagements: Demyansk Pocket; Operation Polarnaya Zvezda; Staraya-Russa Offensive (1943); Battle of Nevel (1943); Operation Bagration; Lublin–Brest Offensive; Vistula-Oder Offensive; Battle of Berlin
- Decorations: Order of the Red Banner; Order of Kutuzov
- Battle honours: Brandenburg

Commanders
- Notable commanders: Col. Filipp Nikolaevich Romashin; Maj. Gen. Yevgeny Mikhailovich Andreev; Col. Fyodor Ivanovich Chirkov; Col. Matvey Mikhailovich Korsun; Maj. Gen. Pyotr Savvich Gavilevsky

The 370th Rifle Division was raised in 1941 as a standard Red Army rifle division, and served for the duration of the Great Patriotic War in that role. It began forming in August 1941 in the Siberian Military District. After forming, the division was initially assigned to the 58th (Reserve) Army, but was soon reassigned to 34th Army in Northwestern Front, and until March 1943, was involved in the dismal fighting around the Demyansk salient. After this was evacuated the division took part in equally difficult combat for the city of Staraya Russa. Near the end of that year the division was reassigned to 2nd Baltic Front, and spent several months in operations near Nevel and north of Vitebsk. In the spring of 1944, its combat path shifted southwards when it was moved to 69th Army in 1st Belorussian Front, south of the Pripet Marshes. In August it was awarded the Order of the Red Banner for its part in the liberation of Kovel. It went on to help form and hold the bridgehead over the Vistula at Puławy, and in January 1945, joined the drive of 1st Belorussian Front across Poland and into eastern Germany, earning the battle honor "Brandenburg". It was disbanded later that year.

== Formation ==
The division began forming on August 10, 1941 in the Siberian Military District at Tomsk. Its basic order of battle was as follows:

- 1230th Rifle Regiment
- 1232nd Rifle Regiment
- 1234th Rifle Regiment
- 940th Artillery Regiment

Col. Filipp Nikolaevich Romashin was not assigned to command of the division until November 1, and he would remain in command until March 5, 1942. As with many other divisions forming in Siberia at the time it was temporarily assigned to 58th (Reserve) Army in the Reserve of the Supreme High Command in the same month. It was finally sent to the front in February 1942, joining 34th Army in Northwestern Front, facing the encircled German II Army Corps at Demyansk. On March 5 Colonel Romashin was replaced by Col. Yevgeny Mikhailovich Andreev, who would be promoted to the rank of major general on December 20, and would remain in command until August 24, 1943.

== Battles for Demyansk ==
When the 370th arrived at the front, 34th Army was holding positions generally north and east of the encircled enemy forces. During April a combined German attack from within and outside of the pocket managed to drive a narrow route (the Ramushevo Corridor) to partly relieve the besieged II Corps; from May to November Northwestern Front staged repeated efforts to cut this lifeline. In the same month the division was transferred to 11th Army which was north of the corridor.

The 370th took part in the offensive that began on July 17. It formed a shock group with the 202nd Rifle Division with the objective of the village of Vasilevshchina on the north side of the corridor. The corridor was only 6km wide at this point and it appeared likely that this attack from the north would succeed in meeting a simultaneous advance by 1st Guards Rifle Corps from the south and cut it. As well, Northwestern Front now had much more artillery, tank and air support than it had had during the winter battles. Facing them was Jäger Regiment 38 of the recently arrived 8th Jäger Division. The attack began with a 90-minute artillery preparation before the two divisions began their advance at 1530 hours. The artillery and air support had been effective, and although tanks and infantry were lost in German minefields, the village was soon in Soviet hands, and a further advance to Loznitsy would cut the corridor. However, 8th Jäger ordered its 38th Regiment to counterattack immediately, and this was remarkably successful, recovering the village and throwing the Red Army forces back in disarray. The contest for the village continued for another six days and both sides suffered serious losses, including 59 knocked-out Soviet tanks. The 370th would not be combat-effective again for several months. On October 26 it was one of the Soviet divisions attacked in Operation Pussta, a final German effort to widen the corridor before winter. This effort gained no ground at all and was called off after 48 hours.

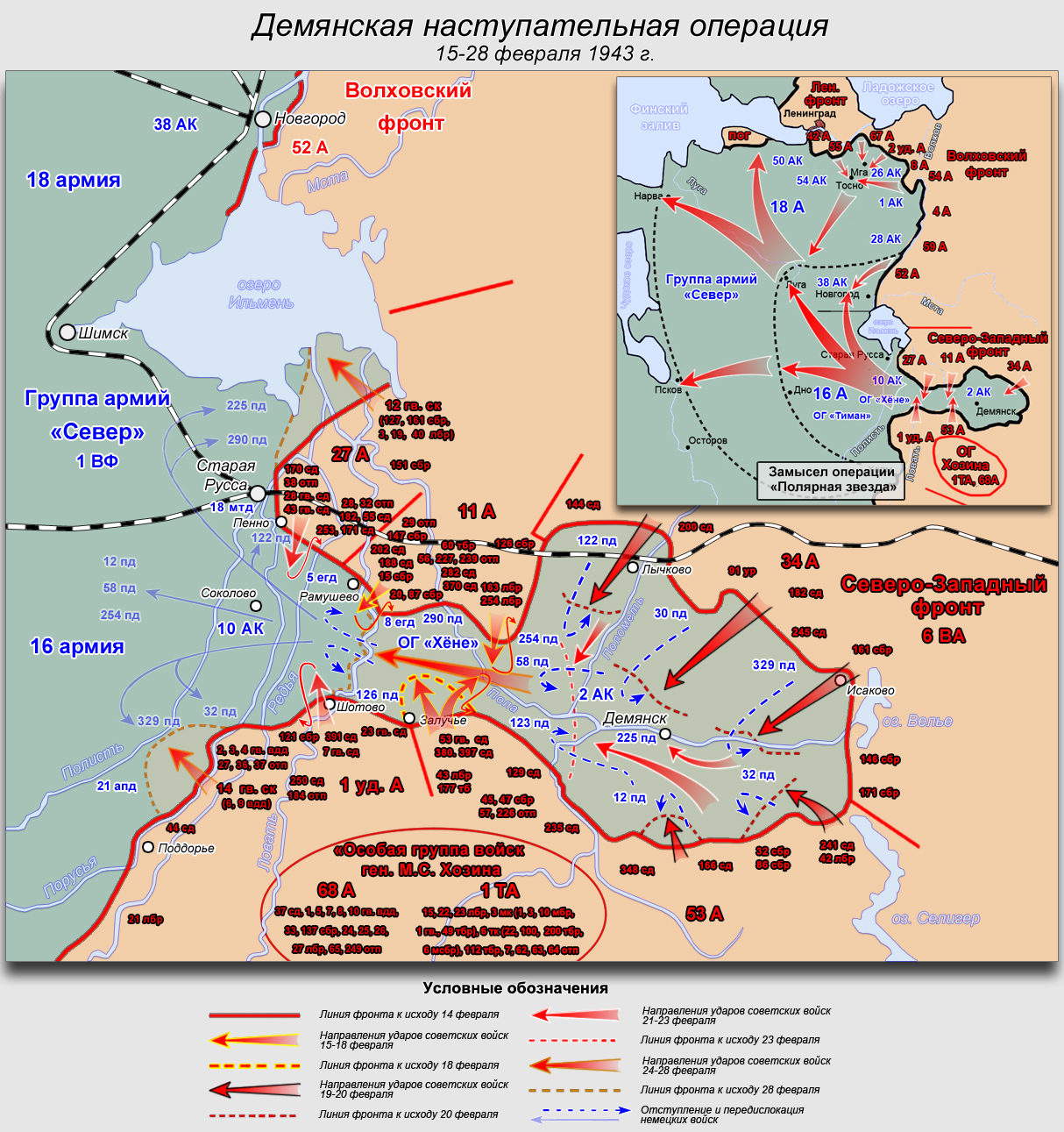
Soviet positions at Demyansk, spring 1943. The 370th was in the 11th Army sector to the west of the German salient

On or around October 16 the STAVKA sent preliminary orders to Northwestern Front to begin preparing for another offensive against the stubborn salient, to coincide with Operation Mars at Rzhev and 3rd Shock Army's offensive on Velikiye Luki. At this time the 370th was still with 11th Army. The makeup of the Army's shock group for this offensive, which began on the night of November 23/24, is not clear; the 202nd Rifle Division managed to take the village of Pustynia after heavy fighting, but the 370th seems to have been held in the second echelon. This effort was shut down on December 11.

On January 31, 1943, the German High Command ordered that the Demyansk salient be evacuated, in the wake of the encirclement and upcoming destruction of 6th Army at Stalingrad. Operation Ziethen began on February 17, at which time the 370th was north of Vasilevshchina with the 282nd Rifle Division. The division had been earmarked for Operation Polyarnaya Zvezda, which began on February 10, but the German withdrawal from Demyansk freed up the reserves they needed to reinforce their lines along the Lovat River, and the operation collapsed. As of March 1 the division was transferred to 27th Army.

== Into Belarus ==
Later in March the division was reassigned to 34th Army, which was facing the German forces defending Staraya Russa. It took part in fighting that month, and again in August, to liberate this town, but was unsuccessful. On August 24, General Andreev passed his command to Col. Zinovy Vasilevich Shakhmanov, but this officer was replaced in turn by Col. Fyodor Ivanovich Chirkov on October 14.

As of October 1 the 370th was still in 34th Army as a separate division. By November 1 it was in the 96th Rifle Corps of the same Army. Shortly after, the division was moved to the Toropets area where it was assigned to 6th Guards Army in 2nd Baltic Front. It soon moved into the northern sector of the salient west of Nevel that had been liberated in October, in preparation for the Pushtoshka-Idritsa Offensive, which began on November 2. 6th Guards went into action on November 10 in the lake region northeast of Nevel, at which time the 370th was under command of the 90th Rifle Corps. The first objective of the offensive was to eliminate the German-held salient running from Novosokolniki to positions west of Nevel, in conjunction with 3rd Shock Army. This attack made negligible progress due to a strong defense, difficult terrain and a sudden thaw, and 6th Guards went over to the defense on November 15.

Over the course of the next four weeks the 370th, along with the 282nd Rifle Division of the 90th Corps, occupied defensive positions north of the corridor into the Nevel salient. During this period there was a good deal of positional fighting, including an attack by the German 23rd Infantry Division on December 1 against the overextended 200th Rifle Division of 3rd Shock Army, which led to 90th Corps being transferred to that Army. The Corps was promptly reinforced with the 18th Guards and 379th Rifle Divisions, which beat back the German gains by December 10. 2nd Baltic Front began a new offensive for Idritsa and Opochka on December 16, but this failed after several days of fighting. Finally, on December 29, Army Group North began an operation to withdraw its forces from the salient north of Nevel. This caught the Red Army by surprise, similar to the German withdrawal from Demyansk, and although a pursuit was soon organized, during which the 370th was transferred to the 93rd Rifle Corps and helped to follow-up the German 290th Infantry Division, no German groupings were cut off, and by January 6, 1944, they had established a new line south of Pustoshka and Novosokolniki. On January 24 Colonel Chirkov was replaced in command by Col. Matvei Mikhailovich Korsun.

== Into Ukraine, Poland and Germany ==
Later in January the division moved back to 90th Corps, and in February it moved again to the 12th Guards Rifle Corps. While under the latter command it led the fighting for the village of Laukhino, near Idritsa. Later in March, the 370th was removed to the Reserve of the Supreme High Command and made a major move southward by rail, after which it was assigned to the 69th Army. It arrived back at the front in April in that Army, in 1st Belorussian Front, assigned to 91st Rifle Corps, and would remain under these commands for the duration of the war. During the first phase of the Soviet summer offensive, the 69th was part of the western grouping of its Front, in the vicinity of Kovel, and played little role in the initial fighting.

This changed with the start of the Brest - Siedlce Offensive Operation on July 18. The 69th, along with the 8th Guards and 47th Armies, formed the shock groups for this assault, which began at 0530 hours following a 30-minute artillery preparation. It was soon determined that most of the enemy had already withdrawn to his next defense line, and the first and some of the second trench lines were carried in the first 90 minutes. That second defense line along the Vyzhuvka River was soon reached and even breached in the Khvorostuv area. This advance was so rapid that the German forces continued retreating to their next line along the Western Bug. By the end of July 20, 69th Army had reached as far as the eastern outskirts of Dubienka after an advance of 8 - 12 km that day. The following day, for political reasons, 69th and 8th Guards Armies were redirected towards Lublin, which was liberated by 8th Guards on July 23.

On August 9, the 370th was decorated for its part in the liberation of Kovel with the award of the Order of the Red Banner. Meanwhile, forward elements of the division reached the Vistula River late on July 27, between Puławy and Kazimierz Dolny. On July 31, Lt. Mikhail Alekseevich Veselov, commander of a rifle platoon of the 1232nd Rifle Regiment, led 17 of his men across the river using improvised means and gained a toehold on the west bank, driving off seven enemy counterattacks over several hours while two companies of his battalion made the crossing to reinforce the bridgehead. In recognition of his feat, Lieutenant Veselov was made a Hero of the Soviet Union on March 24, 1945. The 370th would remain defending the Puławy bridgehead into the new year. On August 18 Colonel Korsun was succeeded in command by Col. Pyotr Savvich Gavilevsky, who would remain in command for the duration, being promoted to the rank of major general on April 20, 1945.

=== Vistula-Oder Offensive ===
At the start of the new offensive on January 14, 1945, the Puławy bridgehead contained 69th and 33rd Armies, which were to attack along a 13km sector in the direction of Radom, and then towards Łódź. 69th Army had the 11th Tank Corps as its mobile group. The assault quickly overcame the defenders, and Radom was liberated on January 16, while flanking forces of the 69th assisted in the clearing of the greater Warsaw area. On February 19, the 370th was recognized for its role in the liberation of the southern districts of Warsaw with the award of the Order of Kutuzov, 2nd degree. At about this time the division was noted as having a national composition of about 50 percent Belorussian, 25 percent Russian, and 25 percent Ukrainian and Moldovan.

=== Battle of Berlin ===
At the start of the Berlin operation the 69th Army was deployed along the east bank of the Oder River, as well as in the bridgehead north of Frankfurt-on-Oder, on an 18km front. Its main attack was to take place from this bridgehead along a 6km attack sector using six rifle divisions in a single echelon. 91st Corps had only one division (the 312th) in the bridgehead, leaving the 370th on the east bank while the 117th Rifle Division was in Army reserve.

The offensive began on April 16, but in the first few days the 370th played little role. Finally, by April 23 it had helped to isolate the German grouping in Frankfurt, and was attached to 33rd Army for the final clearing of that city during the day and into the night. In recognition of this victory the division was awarded a battle honor:

"FRANKFURT-ON-ODER... 370th Rifle Division (Major General Pyotr Savvich Gavilevsky)... The troops that participated in the battles during the breakthrough of the enemy’s defenses and the attack on Berlin, during which Frankfurt-on-Oder and other cities were liberated, are commended by order of the Supreme High Command on April 23, 1945, and saluted in Moscow with 20 artillery salvoes from 224 guns."

The specific honorific granted was "Brandenburg" for the state that contains Frankfurt. Over the following week the division assisted in 69th Army's part in the fighting against the encircled German 9th Army before reaching the eastern bank of the Elbe River on May 5.

== Postwar ==
Following the German surrender, the men and women of the division shared the full title of 370th Rifle, Brandenburg, Order of the Red Banner, Order of Kutuzov Division (Russian: 370-я стрелковая Бранденбургая Краснознамённая ордена Кутузова дивизия). Seven men had been awarded the Gold Star of Heroes of the Soviet Union, and 30 NCOs had become Cavaliers of the Order of Glory. On June 11 the rifle regiments of the division were recognized for their part in the battles southeast of Berlin with the following awards: 1230th and 1234th Regiments, the Order of Suvorov, 3rd degree; the 1232nd Regiment, the Order of Kutuzov, 3rd degree. According to STAVKA Order No. 11095 of May 29, 1945, part 6, the 370th is listed as one of the rifle divisions to be "disbanded in place". It was disbanded in accordance with the directive in July 1945.
