= Ivan Boldin =

Soviet general (1892–1965)

Ivan Vasilievich Boldin
- Born: 15 August 1892; Vysokaya, Penza Governorate, Russian Empire
- Died: 28 March 1965 (aged 72); Kiev, Ukrainian SSR, Soviet Union
- Military career
- Allegiance: Russian Empire (1914–1917); Soviet Union (1917–1958)
- Service years: 1914–1958
- Rank: Colonel General
- Commands: 1st Moscow Separate Rifle Regiment; 19th Rifle Division; 53rd Rifle Division; 18th Rifle Division; 17th Rifle Corps; Kalinin Military District; Cavalry-Mechanized Group of Special Western Military District; Odessa Military District; 19th Army; 50th Army; 27th Army; 8th Guards Army; Eastern Siberian Military District
- Conflicts: World War I Russian Civil War; World War II
- Awards: Order of Lenin (2); Order of the Red Banner (3); Order of Suvorov, 1st Class (3); Order of Kutuzov, 1st Class
- Other work: Military Consultant to the Defense Ministry Group of General Inspectors

Ivan Vasilievich Boldin (Russian: Ива́н Васи́льевич Бо́лдин; 15 August [O.S. 3 August] 1892 – 20 March 1965) was a senior Red Army general and war hero during the Second World War.

== Early military and political career ==
A son of a landed peasant, Boldin was fortunate enough to attend primary and two years of secondary school before beginning work with his father. In 1914 he moved into the village of Vysokaya where he worked in grain processing and bread making. He was drafted into the Russian Imperial Army on 28 July 1914, during World War I. He received several months of infantry training before his regiment, the 23rd Rifle Regiment, was deployed to Sarakomysh on the Turkish front. He served for three years on this front against the Turks, taking part in operations around Erzurum and Kars, and also completing his secondary schooling.

Following the February Revolution in 1917, Boldin became politically active. He served as an elected member of his regimental and divisional revolutionary committees until he was demobilized in December, when he returned to the Insa Region. After the Bolsheviks seized power he became active in local and regional politics. From 7 January to 14 March 1918 he was assistant head of the Insa District Executive Committee, then chaired it until 7 January 1919. He joined the Communist Party in June 1918, and attended the All-Russian Congress of Soviets in July, representing Penza. Following this he served in several positions in local administration and in the Party.

In October 1919, Boldin restarted his military career by volunteering for service in the Red Army in the ongoing Civil War. At its height, he served as a company commander fighting Finnish forces on the Karelian peninsula. He then went to Western Front, fighting in defense of Petrograd against White Russian forces, and later against Polish forces near Polotsk and Lepel in the Polish–Soviet War. In April 1920, he was promoted to command of a battalion, and in August to a regiment. By December 1921, Boldin had shown enough military potential that he was enrolled in the Vystrel Officer Rifle School, from which he graduated in September 1923.

== Between the wars ==
Boldin was posted to Tula after his graduation, taking command of a rifle regiment that he had to form from scratch. He also got involved in political work by serving in the city's Soviet. In November 1924, he was assigned to form and command the Separate Moscow Rifle Regiment (later 1st Moscow Separate RR) as a training establishment for testing new weaponry. Boldin remained politically active, serving as a member of the Moscow Regional Bolshevik Committee. From November 1925 to October 1926 he attended the Frunze Military Academy, while also keeping up his political activity. In a pattern of military and political assignments, Boldin moved up a ladder of increasingly responsible assignments until 1939, and his loyalty was unquestioned during the 1937 purges.

== Occupation of Poland, Latvia and Bessarabia ==
In September 1939, Boldin was chosen to command a Cavalry-Mechanized Group in the Special Western Military District on the border of Poland. This mobile grouping of two cavalry corps, one tank corps, one rifle corps, and a separate tank brigade, formed the mobile lead of Belorussian Front when it invaded eastern Poland on the morning of 17 September. After this short, undistinguished campaign, later in that month Boldin was assigned to head the military delegation which effected the Soviet occupation of Latvia.

His next assignment came in October when he was named as commander of the Odessa Military District. In June 1940, the STAVKA formed a Southern Group of Forces with the intention of staging an invasion of Romanian Bessarabia. Gen G.K. Zhukov, commander of Kiev Military District, was given overall command of the Group, with Boldin in command of the bulk of the Group's forces, the 9th Army. The invasion was carried out from 28 to 30 June, and Boldin was simultaneously promoted to the rank of lieutenant general.

== Great Patriotic War ==
At the outbreak of Operation Barbarossa, Boldin was the deputy of Gen. Dmitry Pavlov, commander of the Western Military District. Both men saw clear indications of the impending attack, but their warnings to the High Command were ignored. Late on 22 June, Pavlov ordered Boldin by phone to mount a counter-attack against German forces advancing on Grodno. Boldin flew in a light aircraft under heavy fire to the command post of 10th Army near Białystok. In the prevailing chaos it was impossible to carry out any effective attack, and by 27 June the 3rd, 4th and 10th Armies were all encircled west of Minsk. Boldin, at the head of a small group, spent the next 45 days fighting for survival behind enemy lines. Finally, on 10 August, leading a total of 1,650 officers and men, his group broke through to Soviet lines near Smolensk. STAVKA Order No. 270 praised the feat of Boldin's "division", and he became a popular hero in those dark days.

His next assignment was back in the re-formed Western Front, as deputy to his old friend, Gen. I.S. Konev. As Army Group Center launched Operation Typhoon on 2 October, Boldin was assigned to command a Front operational group, once again to mount a counter-attack against advancing German forces. This was little more successful than the first, and soon he and his group was encircled near Vyazma. In the course of a successful breakout Boldin was wounded, and spent the next month in hospital and recuperation in Moscow.

In late November, he was summoned to a meeting by Marshal B.M. Shaposhnikov, Chief of the Red Army General Staff, and assigned to command 50th Army, currently in Western Front and defending the city of Tula. The previous commander, Mjr. Gen. A.N. Yermakov, had been arrested for dereliction of duty as a result of his actions when the army had been partly encircled at Bryansk. Boldin later admitted that defending the city against Gen. Guderian was a challenging task to undertake. But although Tula was very deeply outflanked by the beginning of December, it never fell. In conjunction with the rebuilt 1st Guards Cavalry Corps and 10th Army, 50th went on the offensive and drove Guderian's forces back from the southern approaches to Moscow later that month.

Boldin remained continuously in command of 50th Army until February 1945, being promoted to the rank of Colonel-General on 15 July 1944. In spite of his public image as a hero, his superiors saw his military gifts as limited; the 50th Army was usually relatively low in strength and was used in secondary roles. In October 1943, the Army was transferred to Belorussian Front and Boldin came under command of Gen. K.K. Rokossovsky. The latter shared the general opinion of Boldin's talents and kept him in limited roles until his army was transferred to 2nd Belorussian Front in April 1944. Subsequently, in November, Rokossovsky was moved to the latter Front, and again Boldin was under his command. When the East Prussian operation began on 14 January 1945, the 50th Army was sent to keep an eye on the German forces defending along the Augustów Canal. All but a small rearguard of those slipped away to battle the Front's main forces and it was 48 hours before Boldin noticed, all the while reporting that the full force was still in place. Rokossovsky had seen enough, and in February, just as the army was being transferred to 3rd Belorussian Front, Boldin was relieved of command, and his chief of staff, Lt. Gen. Fyodor Ozerov, took over for the duration. After two months on the sidelines, Boldin was appointed as deputy commander of the 3rd Ukrainian Front in the final weeks of the war.

== Later life ==
Beginning in July 1945, Boldin spent a year in command of an army, this time the 27th. He then got the prestigious assignment of command of the 8th Guards Army of the Group of Soviet Forces in Germany, which he held until March 1951, likely because of his political reliability. He commanded the Eastern Siberian Military District for two years, and after a short stint in Gorky Military District, he was assigned as First Deputy Commander-in-Chief of Kiev Military District until 1958.

He was now due for retirement, with a final assignment as Military Consultant to the Defense Ministry Group of General Inspectors. In 1961, he published his memoirs, Pages of Life, and also several articles about the initial days of the war and his role in the defense of Tula in the journal, Voenno-istoricheskii Zhurnal. He died in Kiev on 28 March 1965.
