= Ivan Sovetnikov =

Soviet military commander (1897–1957)

Ivan Gerasimovich Sovetnikov
- Born: June 13, 1897; Insar, Penza Governorate, Russian Empire
- Died: February 1, 1957 (aged 59) Lviv, Ukrainian Soviet Socialist Republic, Soviet Union
- Allegiance: Soviet Union
- Rank: lieutenant general
- Commands: 7th Rifle Division; 5th Army; 34th Army; 4th Army
- Conflicts: World War I; Russian Civil War; World War II; Invasion of Poland; Eastern Front

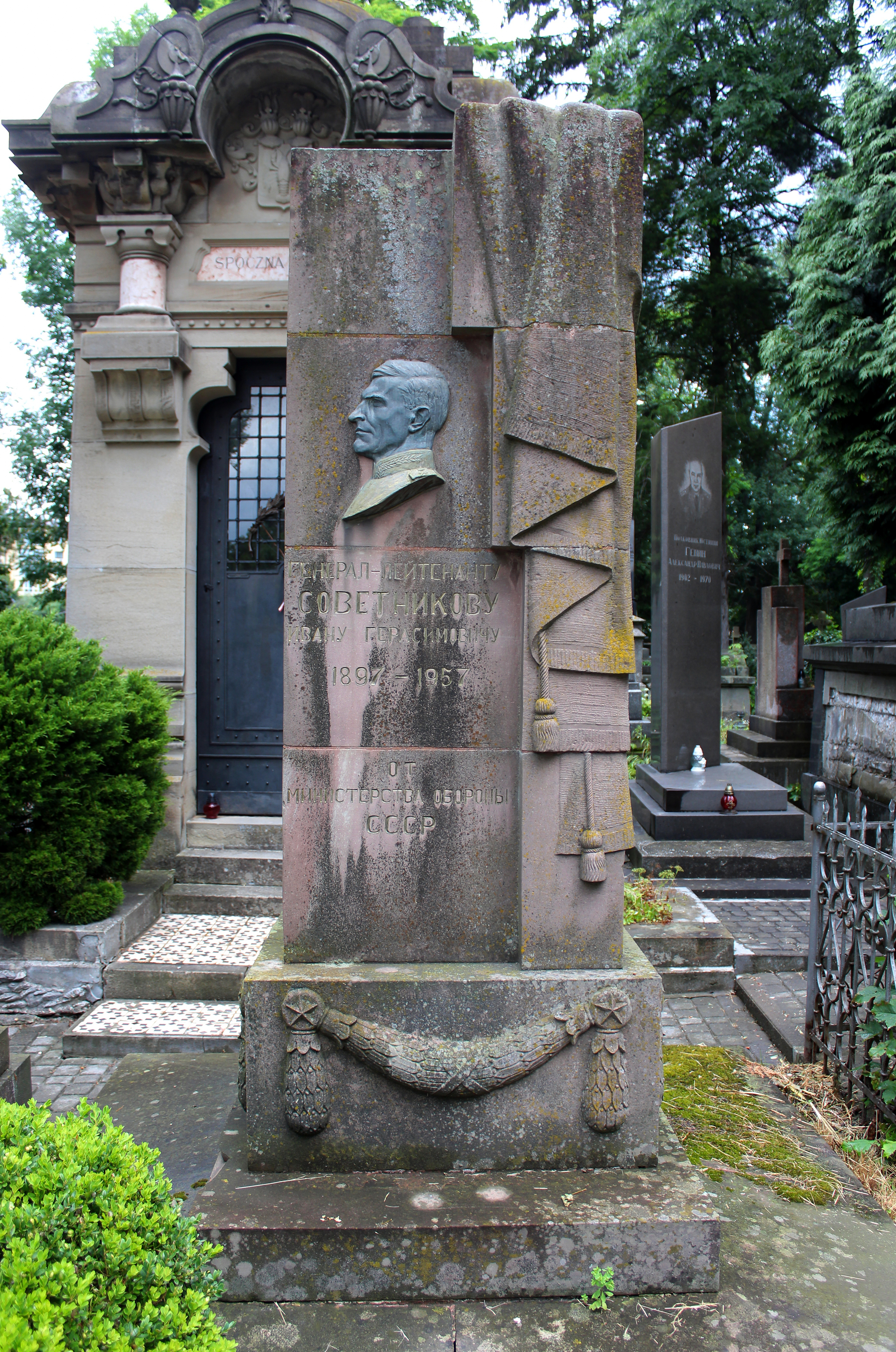
Tombstone on the grave of I. Sovetnikov. Lychakiv cemetery

Ivan Gerasimovich Sovetnikov (Russian: Иван Герасимович Советников; June 13, 1897 – February 1, 1957) was a Soviet military leader.

== Biography ==
He fought in the First World War and the Russian Civil War.

From May 1938 to April 1939 he was commander of the 7th Rifle Division, then became assistant commander of the Kiev Military District. In July 1939, he was appointed commander of the Jitomir Army Group (from September 16 - Shepetov Army Group, from September 18 - Northern Army Group), September 26 transformed into the 5th Army. He commanded the 5th Army during the 1939 Polish campaign and the 1940 Soviet occupation of Bessarabia and northern Bukovina.

With the German invasion of the Soviet Union on June 22, 1941, Ivan Sovetnikov became deputy commander of the South-western Front. On July 12, 1942, the South-Western Front was disbanded, the Stalingrad Front was created as it successor. On September 30, 1942, the Stalingrad Front was renamed the Don Front, which was transformed into the Central Front on February 15, 1943. Ivan Sovetnikov held the position of deputy commander of all these fronts.

On June 22, 1943, Ivan Sovetnikov was appointed commander of the 34th Army (Northwest Front). In November 1943, units of the 34th Army were transferred to the 1st Strike Army, and the Army's command was transferred to the command of the newly formed 4th Army (Caucasus Front), which included the Soviet troops in Iran. Ivan Sovetnikov commanded the 4th Army until the end of the war.

After the war, Ivan Sovetnikov was appointed first deputy commander of the troops of the Turkestan Military District. Since 1950 he was deputy commander of the Carpathian Military District. He was elected deputy of the Supreme Council of the Tajik USSR and deputy of the Supreme Council of the USSR.

He died on February 1, 1957, in Lviv, and was buried in the Lviv city cemetery.
Ivan Sovetnikov was awarded two Orders of Lenin, four Orders of the Red Banner, and numerous medals.
