= Special Mechanized Army =

- Active: 1947–1957
- Country: Soviet Union
- Branch: Soviet Army
- Type: Mechanized army
- Garrison/HQ: Bucharest
- Engagements: Hungarian Revolution of 1956

Commanders
- Notable commanders: Nikolai Gusev; Filipp Golikov; Andrei Getman

The Special Mechanized Army (Russian: Особая механизированная армия) was a mechanized army of the Soviet Army. It was formed from the Southern Group of Forces in 1947 in Romania. Elements of the army fought in Operation Whirlwind, the suppression of the Hungarian Revolution of 1956. In 1957, it became the 1st Separate Army, which later became the 1st Guards Army.

== History ==
The Special Mechanized Army was formed on 20 December 1947 from the first formation of the Southern Group of Forces. Its headquarters was located in Bucharest. The army's first commander was Colonel General Vyacheslav Tsvetayev. The army included the 2nd Guards Mechanized Division at Craiova, the 4th Guards Mechanized Division at Sofia, and the 25th Guards Mechanized Division at Constanța. On 30 January 1948 Lieutenant General Vladimir Sviridov took command. In the spring of 1948 the 4th Guards Mechanized Division was withdrawn to the Kiev Military District.

On 20 April 1949 Colonel General Nikolai Gusev replaced Sviridov. In August the 2nd Guards Mechanized Division was relocated to Hungary, reducing the army to one division. In September 1949 the 33rd Guards Mechanized Division arrived in Timișoara from the Odessa Military District. On 3 September 1950, Colonel General Filipp Golikov became the army's commander. In late 1953 the 81st Guards Rifle Division was relocated from the Kiev Military District to Arad. The army also included the 86th Anti-Aircraft Artillery Division at Constanța and the 66th Fighter and 67th Mixed Aviation Divisions at Ploiești and Timișoara, respectively. On 17 January 1956 Colonel General Andrei Getman became the army's commander. The 81st Guards Rifle Division's 233rd Guards Rifle Regiment was attached to the 33rd Guards Mechanized Division in 1956. The 33rd Guards Mechanized Division was detached to the Special Corps and fought in Operation Whirlwind, the suppression of the Hungarian Revolution of 1956. On 6 April 1957, the army was redesignated the 1st Separate Army.
