= Lgovsky Uyezd =

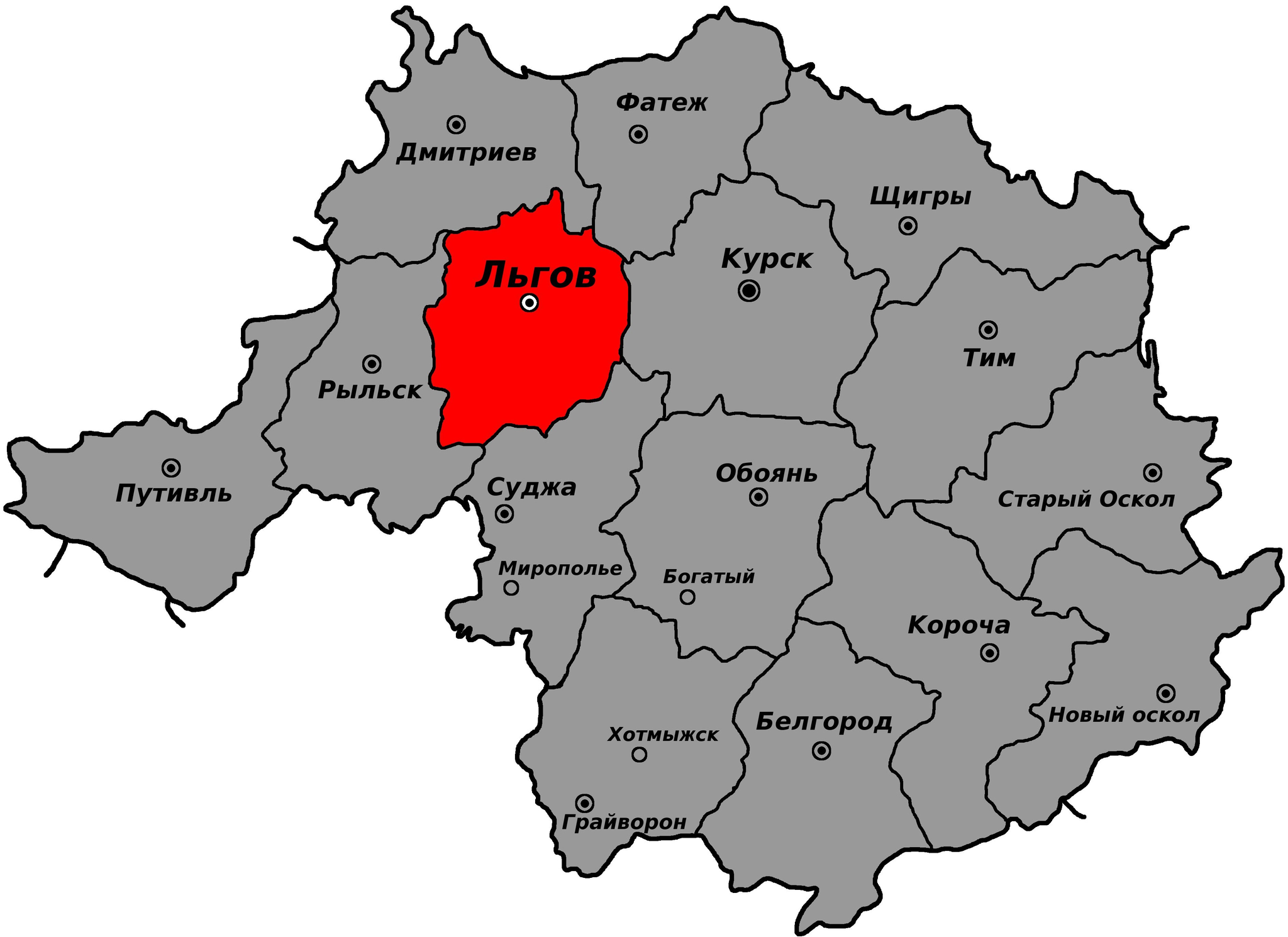
Lgovwky Uyezd in the Russian empire

Lgovsky Uyezd (Льго́вский уе́зд) was one of the subdivisions of the Kursk Governorate of the Russian Empire. It was situated in the northwestern part of the governorate. Its administrative centre was Lgov.

== Demographics ==
At the time of the Russian Empire Census of 1897, Lgovsky Uyezd had a population of 130,039. Of these, 95.2% spoke Russian, 4.5% Ukrainian, 0.1% Yiddish, 0.1% Estonian, 0.1% Polish and 0.1% Romani as their native language.
