= 25th Cavalry Division =

25th Cavalry Division (9 July 1941 – 15 July 1942)
- Active: 1941–1942
- Country: Soviet Union
- Branch: Red Army
- Type: Division
- Role: Cavalry
- Engagements: Leningrad Strategic Defensive; Siege of Leningrad; Lyuban Offensive Operation

Commanders
- Notable commanders: Maj. Gen. Nikolai Ivanovich Gusev; Lt. Col. David Markovich Barinov

The 25th Cavalry Division was a mounted division of the Red Army that served for just over a year in the Great Patriotic War. It was formed in the summer of 1941 and served in the region south and west of Leningrad during the following months against the advance of Army Group North during Operation Barbarossa. It survived a German armored counterattack before being pulled back into the reserves in September. In January 1942, it was assigned to the Mobile Group of 2nd Shock Army to take part in the Lyuban Offensive Operation. This offensive aimed to encircle and destroy the German forces besieging Leningrad; in the event, 2nd Shock was itself encircled and forced to break out as individuals and small groups from May into July. The 25th Cavalry was disbanded, and its survivors were used to help rebuild the badly depleted 19th Guards Rifle Division, while the 25th's commanding officer took over the latter division.

== Formation ==
The 25th Cavalry Division began forming on 9 July 1941 at Pskov in the Leningrad Military District. It was given the number of a pre-war cavalry division that had been disbanded in the same District in 1940. When formed, its basic order of battle was as follows:

- 98th Cavalry Regiment
- 100th Cavalry Regiment
- 104th Cavalry Regiment

The division was commanded by Kombrig Nikolai Ivanovich Gusev. This officer would have his rank modernized as Major General on 9 November and would remain in command until 20 January 1942. Gusev would go on to command several Soviet armies during the remainder of the War, rising to the rank of Colonel General on 5 May 1945.

The 25th was almost immediately assigned to the 34th (Reserve) Army. When Army Group North paused in its advance on Leningrad in early August, Northwestern Front was ordered by the STAVKA to mount a counterstroke to retake the city of Staraya Russa which would be led primarily by 34th Army. The orders included the following:

"6. Simultaneously with the 34th Army's assault from the Lovat River line, dispatch the 25th Cavalry Division along the Dedovichi and Dno axis to operate in separate squadrons against the enemy rear area."

This attack was planned for 12 August, but was preempted by the renewal of the German drive on 10 August, and so achieved mixed results. The 25th, operating in a mobile group with the 163rd and 202nd Motorized Divisions, advanced 40 km westward through the German defenses and reached the Dno - Staraya Russa rail line by 14 August. This enveloped the German X Army Corps in the latter city and threatened the rear of the panzer group advancing on Novgorod. 16th Army was forced to intervene with the LVI Panzer Corps, which by 25 August had driven 34th Army back to the Lovat line with 30 percent losses. However, this also delayed the German advance on Leningrad by ten days.

== Later Service and Disbandment ==
In September the division was moved to the reserves of Northwestern Front for rebuilding, where it would remain into December. In that month it was briefly assigned to 52nd Army in Volkhov Front. On 20 January 1942, General Gusev was assigned to take command of 2nd Shock Army's 13th Cavalry Corps, to which the 25th was soon subordinated. Lt. Col. David Markovich Barinov, Gusev's chief of staff, took command of the division the next day, and he would remain in this post until it was disbanded.

Meanwhile, Volkhov Front began its Lyuban Offensive across the Volkhov River on 6 January, before its full forces, most importantly its artillery, was fully in place. As a result, the attackers were slow to make gains, at heavy cost. It was not until the night of 23–24 January that the Front commander, Gen. K. A. Meretskov, was able to convince himself that 2nd Shock Army had torn enough of a hole in the German defenses that he could commit the 13th Corps, plus a rifle division of 59th Army, into the gap. German counterattacks at once began trying to close it, and while on the one hand the mobile group was in a position to do harm in the German rear, its 30,000 troops also represented a target for destruction should the gap be closed.

Over the following weeks more Soviet forces were fed into the pocket, but a counterattack by German 18th Army succeeded in closing the gap on 20 March. A week later a new gap was opened near the village of Miasnoi Bor, but it was only 3–5 km wide. The Red Army forces in the salient continued to operate under these circumstances through April and into May. On 12 May, Soviet intelligence indicated that 18th Army was about to attack again to cut the corridor. In light of this, orders came from the STAVKA to begin a phased withdrawal from the salient on 14 May; when this proved impossible due to the depleted state of its forces, a full breakout and withdrawal was ordered on 21 May. During June and July individual men and small parties of the 25th Cavalry, by now entirely dismounted, made their way through the thinly-held German lines. The division was officially disbanded on 15 July, and its survivors were combined with those of the 19th Guards Rifle Division to begin that division's rebuilding. On 27 July, Lt. Col. Barinov was promoted to colonel and took command of 19th Guards, whose commander had been officially listed as missing in action two days earlier.
