= 34th Army (Soviet Union) =

34th Army (1941–1944)
- 34-я армия
- Active: 16 July 1941 – 15 January 1944
- Disbanded: 15 January 1944
- Country: Soviet Union
- Branch: Red Army
- Type: Combined arms
- Size: Field Army
- Part of: Moscow Military District; Reserve Front; Northwestern Front
- Engagements: Leningrad Strategic Defensive; Staraya-Russa Offensive; Demyansk Defensive; Demyansk Offensive (1942); Demyansk Offensive; Staraya-Russa Offensive (1943)

Commanders
- Notable commanders: See List

The 34th Army (Russian: 34-я армия) was part of the Red Army during the Second World War. The army was formed on 16 July 1941 in the Moscow Military District.

== Combat history ==
=== 1941 ===
On 18 July the army was assigned to the Moscow line of defense occupying positions west of Maloyaroslavets where it was assigned troops. On 25 July the army became part of the reserve commanded by Lieutenant General Ivan Bogdanov, which on 30 July was designated as the Reserve Front the army headquarters located in Lüübnitsa, Russia (now Estonia). On 6 August the army was reassigned to the Northwestern Front.

Composition on 1 August 1941:

245th Rifle Division
257th Rifle Division
259th Rifle Division
262nd Rifle Division
25th Cavalry Division
54th Cavalry Division
171st Antitank Artillery Regiment
759th Antitank Artillery Regiment
16th Armored Train
59th Armored Train

The army was tasked to defend the eastern bank of the Lovat River from Kholm to Kulakovo south of the German-held city of Staraya Russa. STAVKA Directive 00824 tasked the army to strike the left wing of the German forces defeating the forces in the area between Soltsy and Staraya Russa. If successful, the operation could cut off the entire right flank of the Army Group North. According to the order the army was by 15 August to advance more the 25 miles to the line of Snezhka-Chudinovo-Rechnye Kottsy, and by 18 August was to reach the line of Volot-Dolzhino.

By 11 August the army had reached the Polist River along a 24-mile front from Vzglyady to Gojko and launched their offensive. The German X Corps only had small outposts on its flank with the 30th and 129th Infantry Divisions east of Staraya Russa arrayed against the Soviet 11th Army and the 290th Infantry Division on the south side of Staraya Russa guarding the Germ right flank. After the start of the Soviet Offensive the German forces were moved west of Staraya Russa.

The first echelon, consisting of the 245th, 257th, 262nd Rifle and the 25th Cavalry Divisions, advanced quickly reaching there 18 August goals by 14 August and cutting the railroad between Dno and Staraya Russa.

By the end of September the army's line had stabilized to the north and northeast of Demyansk from Lake Vella to Lychkovo and remained in these positions through the end of the year.

=== 1943 ===
The year began as it did in 1942 with preparations for participation in the Demyansk Offensive.

Composition on 1 February 1943:

171st Rifle Division
182nd Rifle Division
200th Rifle Division
245th Rifle Division
144th Rifle Brigade
146th Rifle Brigade
161st Rifle Brigade
91st Fortified Region
458th Light Artillery Regiment (75th Light Artillery Brigade)
698th Light Artillery Regiment (78th Light Artillery Brigade)
387th Gun Artillery Regiment (76th Gun Artillery Brigade)
575th High-Power Howitzer Artillery Regiment
1200th High-Power Howitzer Artillery Regiment
482nd Mortar Regiment
9th Guards Mortar Brigade
95th Guards Mortar Regiment
83rd Tank Brigade
29th Armored Train Battalion
238th Engineer Battalion
1391st Engineer Regiment
597th Bomber Aviation Regiment

Prior to the start of the offensive the German successfully withdrew their forces from the Demyansk Pocket and the 34th Army was limited to pursuing rear guard forces. By 28 February the army had arrived at the Lovat River. By the elimination of the pocket the front line had been significantly decreased, and the units of the 34th Army were reassigned to the 11th and 52nd Armies and the headquarters airlifted to the area northeast of Staraya Russa where it took command of some of the forces assigned to the 27th Army.

On 18 March the army, with forces recently reassigned from the 27th attempted to storm Staraya Russa. The army encountered five German divisions along the line of villages Dinner Medvedno, Bryashnaya Gore Sobolev Derevkovo to Porus, the attack was repulsed, restarted on 20 March when it was able to liberate a few small villages moving a little closer to Staraya Russa but unable to liberate the city. The army remained outside Staraya Russa until November 1943 holding the defensive line and attempting to storm the city. On 17–20 August another massive attack was attempted and repulsed again.

Composition on 1 April 1943:

12th Guards Rifle Corps

127th Rifle Brigade
144th Rifle Brigade
151st Rifle Brigade
161st Rifle Brigade

26th Rifle Division
245th Rifle Division
254th Rifle Division
282nd Rifle Division
370th Rifle Division
27th Ski Brigade
26th Artillery Division

75th Light Artillery Brigade
72nd Gun Artillery Brigade
77th Howitzer Artillery Brigade
24th Mortar Brigade

11th Guards Army Artillery Regiment
191st High-Power Howitzer Artillery Regiment
515th High-Power Howitzer Artillery Regiment
402nd High-Power Artillery Regiment
482nd Mortar Regiment
8th Guards Mortar Brigade
22nd Guards Mortar Regiment
26th Guards Mortar Regiment
39th Guards Mortar Regiment
95th Guards Mortar Regiment
708th Antiaircraft Artillery Regiment (44th Antiaircraft Artillery Division)
3rd Separate Guards Tank Regiment
239th Separate Tank Regiment
11th Aerosleigh Battalion
18th Aerosleigh Battalion
35th Aerosleigh Battalion
29th Armored Train Battalion
35th Armored Train Battalion
238th Engineer Battalion
1391st Engineer Battalion
86th Pontoon-Bridge Battalion

Composition on 1 November 1943:

96th Rifle Corps

37th Rifle Division
150th Rifle Division
370th Rifle Division

26th Rifle Division
182nd Rifle Division
37th Rifle Brigade
27th Artillery Division

78th Light Artillery Brigade
76th Gun Artillery Brigade
74th Howitzer Artillery Brigade

151st Gun Artillery Regiment
989th Howitzer Artillery Regiment
641st Tank Destroyer Regiment
32nd Mortar Brigade
482nd Mortar Regiment
21st Guards Mortar Brigade
26th Guards Mortar Regiment
27th Guards Mortar Regiment
70th Guards Mortar Regiment
47th Antiaircraft Artillery Division

1585th Antiaircraft Artillery Regiment
1586th Antiaircraft Artillery Regiment
1591st Antiaircraft Artillery Regiment
1592nd Antiaircraft Artillery Regiment

582nd Antiaircraft Artillery Regiment
63rd Guards Antiaircraft Artillery Battalion
64th Guards Antiaircraft Artillery Battalion
65th Separate Tank Regiment
239th Separate Tank Regiment
249th Separate Tank Regiment
29th Armored Train Battalion
35th Armored Train Battalion
1391st Engineer Battalion
54th Pontoon-Bridge Battalion
58th Pontoon-Bridge Battalion
86th Pontoon-Bridge Battalion

=== Disbanding ===
On 20 November 1943 the forces assigned to the army were transferred to 1st Shock Army and the headquarters placed in STAVKA reserve. On 15 January 1944 the headquarters was redesignated 4th Army (III formation).

== Commanders ==
- Brigade Commander Nikolai Nilovich Pronin- (18 July – 3 August 1941)
- Major General Kuzma Kachanov (ru) - (3 August – 12 September 1941) - executed
- Major General Petr Alferev - (12 September – 25 December 1941)
- Major General Nikolai Berzarin - (25 December 1941 – 14 October 1942)
- Lieutenant General Anton Lopatin - (14 October 1942 – 10 March 1943)
- Lieutenant General Pavel Kurochkin - (10 March – 22 June 1943)
- Lieutenant General Ivan Sovetnikov - (22 June 1943 – 13 January 1944)
