= 50th Army (Soviet Union) =

- 50-я армия
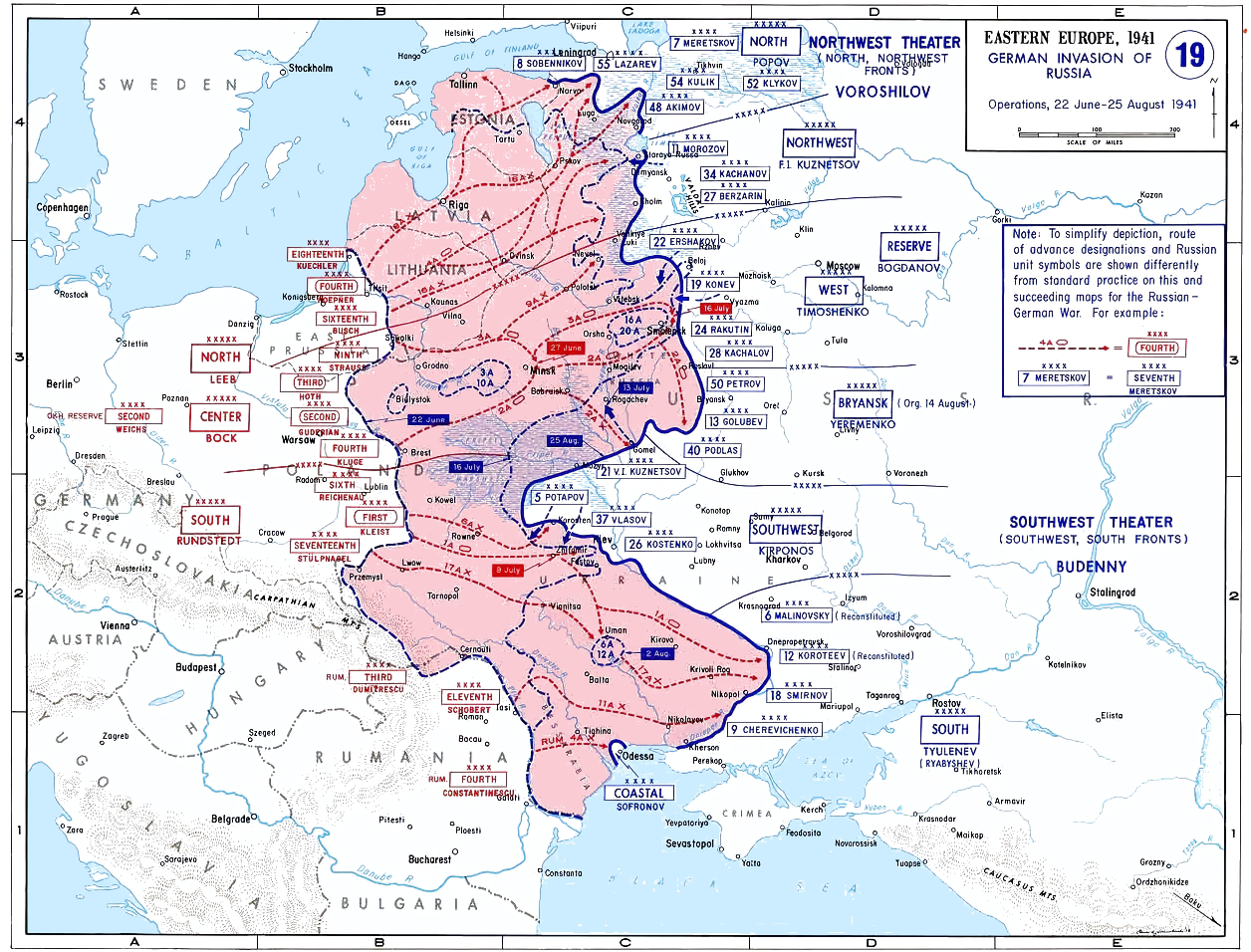
- Axis Invasion of the Soviet Union, 22 June to 25 August 1941.
- Active: August 1941 – October 1945
- Country: Soviet Union
- Branch: Red Army
- Type: Infantry
- Size: Field army
- Part of: Bryansk Front; Western Front; Belorussian Front; 1st Belorussian Front; 2nd Belorussian Front; 3rd Belorussian Front
- Engagements: Battle of Smolensk (1941); Operation Typhoon; Battle of Moscow; Operation Kutuzov; Battle of Smolensk (1943); Operation Bagration; East Prussian Offensive; Battle of Königsberg

Commanders
- Notable commanders: Ivan Boldin

The 50th Army (Russian: 50-я армия) was a Soviet field army during World War II. It was formed in mid-August, 1941 and deployed on the southwest approaches to Moscow. Partly encircled and destroyed by German Second Panzer Army in the opening stages of Operation Typhoon, enough of the army escaped that it could be reinforced to successfully defend the city of Tula in November. It was at this time that the 50th came under the command of Lt. Gen. Ivan Boldin, who continued in command until February, 1945. During most of its career the army was relatively small and accordingly served in secondary roles. It finished the war in East Prussia, under the command of Lt. Gen. Fyodor Ozerov, as part of 3rd Belorussian Front.

== Formation ==
The Army became active on August 16, 1941, along the Desna River as part of the newly-forming Bryansk Front. The Army's first commander, Major General Mikhail Petrov, issued his Combat Order No. 1 on that date. In it, he recorded the composition of the 50th Army as follows:

- 217th Rifle Division
- 258th Rifle Division
- 260th Rifle Division
- 269th Rifle Division
- 279th Rifle Division
- 280th Rifle Division
- 55th Cavalry Division
- Artillery regiments of 2nd and 20th Rifle Corps
- 753rd and 761st Antitank Regiments
- 86th Separate Antiaircraft Battalion
- 10th Separate Armored Car Battalion
- 5th Separate Sapper Battalion

Except for the 217th which formed in March, all of these rifle divisions had formed in July, as few as four weeks earlier.

Bryansk Front was under the command of Gen. Andrey Yeryomenko. During the balance of August and most of September he ordered his forces, including the relatively fresh 50th Army, into repeated clashes with the German XLVII Motorized Corps over its possession of a bridgehead over the Desna anchored on the towns of Pochep and Pogar. This was also an attempt to disrupt 2nd Panzer Army as it prepared to strike southwards towards Kiev. These operations had little effect on the German forces and also severely weakened the Front just as it was to face its greatest test. As of September 30, strength returns for 50th Army showed 61,503 personnel, 780 guns and mortars (of which 149 were antitank guns), but only 7 tanks. It was still one of the stronger armies before Moscow, but not so strong as it had been when formed.

== Operation Typhoon ==
On September 30, 1941, the 2nd Panzer Army launched Operation Typhoon in the 50th Army's sector. On the third day it had penetrated the weak 13th Army and a day later reached Oryol. The 50th Army was bypassed, as was Yeryomenko's headquarters. On October 2, Major I. Shabalin, the head of the army's political section, wrote:

"A continuous rumble of enemy artillery can be heard, and masses of their aircraft are flying overhead – our antiaircraft guns are shooting at them constantly. It is clear we are facing a major assault along our whole front, and in many sectors our troops have already been pushed back."

On October 7, Major General Petrov was given temporary command of Bryansk Front after Yeryomenko was wounded. Major General Arkady Yermakov, who had been leading an operational group within the Front, took up command of 50th Army until late November.

The pocketed forces were split in two when 17th Panzer Division and 167th Infantry Division linked up on October 10, with 50th Army in the northern pocket, but the eastern perimeter was only very lightly held so the army was never completely cut off from the main front. On that date, General Weichs, commander of German 2nd Army, reported that "a strong part of the Red Fiftieth Army... could not be prevented from escaping." General Guderian of the 2nd Panzer Army further reported that his forces were committed to containing breakouts from the southern pocket and had nothing available to help with the northern one. The 50th was able to fall back beyond Bryansk without catastrophic losses.

== Defense of Tula ==
By late October 50th Army had fallen back towards the city of Tula and partly repaired its strength. Three extremely depleted divisions, the 293rd, 413th and 239th Rifle Division, arrived from the front, each with between 500 and 1,000 men, who were exhausted and with little equipment. Within two months these divisions had been refitted and reinforced to authorized strength.

With the disruption of Bryansk Front, 50th Army was reassigned to Western Front. Army Group Center's supplies had been barely adequate for the encirclement phases of Typhoon, and as the autumn rains turned the roads to mud, Guderian was forced to postpone his drive on Tula until October 23. The town of Chern fell on the 25th, leaving another 95 km to Tula. A battlegroup, forcing its way up the one available highway, got within 5 km of the city on October 29 and tried to take it off the march, but the defenders were prepared and drove the panzers off with strong antitank and antiaircraft fire. 50th Army was in a much better position for supplies, with munitions coming directly from Tula's factories.

In mid-November General Yermakov came under investigation by the Special Department of the NKVD led by Viktor Abakumov, and was accused of dereliction of duty during the Bryansk encirclement. He was tried in secret and executed.

In late November Lieutenant General Ivan Boldin was summoned to Moscow and offered command of the army to direct the continued defense of this crucial city. Boldin was a popular hero for having led a group of 1,650 men back from the frontier to Soviet lines near Smolensk during July and early August. He had been acting as deputy commander of Western Front until being wounded in another breakout in October. Boldin later admitted that defending the city against Guderian was a challenging task to undertake. But although Tula was deeply outflanked by the beginning of December, it never fell. In conjunction with 10th Army, the 50th Army went on the offensive and drove Guderian's forces back from the southern approaches to Moscow. In the initial phase, elements of the 50th overran one battalion of the elite Grossdeutschland Regiment.

== Winter Offensive and 1942 ==
In December, more divisions were added to the army: four rifle divisions, three cavalry divisions, a depleted tank division, and independent tank regiments. The rapid reconstruction of this army was probably typical of many others in this period.

On January 8, 1942 50th Army launched the second phase of the Moscow counteroffensive with a surprise attack on German positions southeast of Tula. On the 18th, Boldin introduced an army mobile group to the battle, which tore through the sagging German defenses and liberated the city of Kaluga. Boldin received much credit for this, which he shared with other commanders and the 1st Guards Cavalry Corps which led the group. Following this, the 50th pressed westward as part of the Rzhev-Vyasma Offensive, making repeated and increasingly futile efforts to cut the Smolensk – Moscow highway and encircle Army Group Center. On April 14 the Army attacked to try to join up with the encircled Group Belov, and at one point only 2 km remained between the two forces, but the next day German counterattacks forced it to fall back. As the Army weakened through attrition and the German forces regained their balance, Boldin showed his frustration in numerous after-action reports. On April 22 he reported angrily to his superiors that he was being slowed down by lack of ammunition, due to poor road conditions for wheeled transport: "As an extreme measure, in some units the troops are carrying supplies by hand." He was also driven to distraction by the total lack of air support. In these conditions the offensive ground to a halt.

During the balance of 1942 and into early 1943 the 50th, reduced to just four rifle divisions and a few supporting units, manned the defenses southwest of Moscow. It played a very limited role in the Third Rzhev–Sychevka Offensive Operation, liberating a small sector at the base of the Rzhev Salient as the Germans withdrew. Attacking on the left wing of the Front's shock force, it pivoted towards Miliatino and confronted the German 4th Army's XII Corps, which held strong defenses north of Spas-Demensk:

"The 50th Army's formations reached the enemy's main defensive belt on 17 March, where they encountered stiff resistance. Attempts to penetrate failed in spite of the commitment of the second echelon 139th Rifle Division into combat and the subsequent reinforcement of the army with the 277th Rifle Division and artillery units. The army's forces went over to the defense along a line northeast and east of Spas-Demensk on 1 April."

In reality, directives from STAVKA on March 18 ordered Western Front to make a concerted effort to smash the new German line, in spite of its obvious strength. The effort failed at the cost of heavy Soviet casualties.

== Operation Kutuzov ==
On July 1, 1943, the 50th Army was still in Western Front, at the northern base of the Oryol Salient. Its order of battle was as follows.

In 38th Rifle Corps:

- 17th Rifle Division
- 326th Rifle Division
- 413th Rifle Division

Independent divisions:

- 49th Rifle Division
- 64th Rifle Division
- 212th Rifle Division
- 324th Rifle Division

Other units:

- 196th Tank Brigade
- 1536th Heavy SU Regiment
- 21st and 43rd Armored Train Battalions
- 447th, 523rd, 1091st Cannon Regiments
- 600th Antitank Regiment
- 541st, 542nd Mortar Regiments
- 54th Guards Mortar Regiment
- 1275th, 1482nd, 1483rd Antiaircraft Regiments
- 307th, 309th Separate Sapper Battalions

Following the Soviet victory at the Battle of Kursk, STAVKA began developing its first summer offensive, beginning with Operation Kutuzov against the vulnerable salient centered at Oryol. 50th Army was given a supporting role, both due to its relatively small size and STAVKA's limited faith in Boldin's military capabilities. In this operation the army formed a right flank guard for 11th Guards Army as it attacked to cut off the salient. German 9th Army escaped encirclement, but Boldin's army managed a 50 km advance before the advance stalled.

Following this, the army was reassigned back to Bryansk Front. Renewing the offensive, Boldin's forces made two secret re-groupings before striking the weak left flank of the German position south of Kirov on September 8, unhinging their line and forcing them to abandon Bryansk on the 17th. In Soviet accounts it is Gen. M.M. Popov, the Front commander, who gets most of the credit for this success. By September 27, 50th Army had seized a bridgehead across the Sozh River, and it was on this date that Popov met at the Kremlin with Stalin, Deputy Chief of the General Staff A.I. Antonov, and Gen. K.K. Rokossovsky, commander of Belorussian Front (later renamed 1st Belorussian Front). As a result of this meeting 50th Army was handed over to the latter Front in the first week of October.

In keeping with its secondary role, during the balance of October and November, during the Gomel-Rechitsa Offensive Operation, the army was twice ordered to make diversionary attacks. Rokossovsky wrote in his memoirs:

"Now the success of the entire Front depended on the operations of the 65th Army. Therefore we turned over all the Front's assets to it. In order to distract the enemy's attention from the axis of our main attack, the 50th and 3rd Armies received an order on 12 October to go on the offensive in their sectors. With a pained heart I gave them these assignments, knowing the limited means that Boldin and Gorbatov possessed, but this was necessary in the common interests, and it was necessary deliberately to accept certain sacrifices."

During the spring of 1944, 50th Army was reinforced with the 8th SU Brigade of SU-76 self-propelled guns, backing up the rifle divisions in their limited assaults until being withdrawn into front reserves prior to the summer offensive. Also during the spring the army had the occasional support of the similarly-armed 1444th SU Regiment; in July this regiment would join the army for the duration.

By April the army had been reassigned once again, to 2nd Belorussian Front.

== Operation Bagration ==
When the Soviet summer offensive began on June 22, 1944, the composition of 50th Army was as follows.

19th Rifle Corps, with:

- 324th Rifle Division
- 362nd Rifle Division

38th Rifle Corps, with:

- 110th Rifle Division
- 139th Rifle Division
- 385th Rifle Division

121st Rifle Corps, with:

- 238th Rifle Division
- 380th Rifle Division

Independent division:

- 307th Rifle Division

Other units:

- 4th Antitank Brigade and 1321st Antitank Regiment
- 1819th and 1830th SU Regiments
- 1484 Antiaircraft Regiment
- 1099 Corps Artillery Regiment
- 481 Heavy Mortar Regiment

2nd Belorussian Front played a secondary role in Bagration, mainly holding German 4th Army in place on both sides of the River Dnieper. 50th Army was spread over a 75 km sector. On the first day a company-sized attack on the German 31st Infantry Division was made at Golovenchitsky, but this had little impact. On the third morning, the 121st Rifle Corps joined 49th Army in a massive attack on 337th Infantry and Feldherrnhalle Panzergrenadier Divisions which opened a gap in the XXXIX Panzer Corps line by noon as the 337th disintegrated. On the same day, 19th Rifle Corps made a partial penetration at Ludchitsa, while a 10 km advance was made at Podsely. On June 25 the army hit the north flank of 31st Infantry and took Chausy. By evening the Germans were ordered to retreat to the Resta River.

On the following day the objective was to reach the Dniepr north of Mogilev, but 50th Army stalled at Chausy. South of the city, 121st and 38th Corps threw the 12th and 31st Infantry Divisions out of prepared positions and reached the east bank of the river by 2200 hours. On the 27th, as the river was being crossed both north and south of Mogilev, 121st Corps, plus two divisions of 49th Army with armored support, struck the northwest suburbs, street fighting with 12th Infantry during the night. The German stronghold fell the next day, but at considerable cost to both armies, which Boldin would be criticized for. Other elements of these armies broke through the west bank defenses, advancing rapidly to the Drut River.

With 4th Army effectively smashed, 50th Army was left to take part in the destruction of its remnants east of Minsk. On July 8 the army's forward (mobile) detachment, which included the 1434th SU Regiment (SU-85s), liberated the Belorussian town of Novogrudok. In the following days and weeks the advance became slower and more grueling, across the Neman River through Grodno, to the approaches to East Prussia, arriving there in late August. On July 15, Boldin was promoted to the rank of Colonel General. In November, Rokossovsky was moved to the command of 2nd Belorussian Front, and Boldin once again came under his orders.

== East Prussian Offensive ==
At the beginning of 1945, just prior to the start of the winter offensive, the order of battle of 50th Army was as follows.

69th Rifle Corps, with:

- 110th Rifle Division
- 324th Rifle Division
- 191st Rifle Division
- 153rd Rifle Division

81st Rifle Corps, with:

- 343rd Rifle Division

Independent divisions:

- 2nd Rifle Division
- 307th Rifle Division
- 330th Rifle Division
- 369th Rifle Division

Other units:

- 91st Fortified Region
- 153rd Fortified Region
- 161st Fortified Region

The East Prussian operation began on January 14, 1945. 2nd Belorussian Front made relatively slow progress at first, but gained speed with the introduction of tank forces and improving weather. 50th Army was set to keep an eye on the German forces defending along the Augustów Canal. All but a small rearguard of those slipped away to battle the Front's main forces and it was 48 hours before Boldin noticed, all the while reporting that the full force was still in place. Rokossovsky had seen enough, and in February, just as the army was being transferred to 3rd Belorussian Front, Boldin was given a kick upstairs, and his chief of staff, Lieutenant General Fyodor Ozerov, took command for the duration.

Beginning on April 6, the army formed the right flank of the Soviet forces in the assault on Königsberg. One corps was to hold the line while two corps with a total of six rifle divisions took part in the attack. 50th Army was reinforced with artillery, 65 tanks and 42 heavy self-propelled guns (ISU-122 and ISU-152), and one assault engineer-sapper brigade. On the first day the army's units had advanced up to two kilometres, capturing a fort west of Baydritten and clearing 39 city blocks. On the 7th an additional 1.5 – 2 km penetration was made, helping to force the German garrison back to their second position. On the 8th the army, closely cooperating along its right flank with the 43rd Army, captured the Palfe area. The German forces capitulated late in the day on the 9th, and on the 10th the remaining pockets of resistance were eliminated.

== Postwar ==
50th Army disbanded in late 1945 when it was reorganised as the headquarters of the Eastern Siberian Military District in Irkutsk.

== Commanders ==
The following officers commanded the army.

- Major General Mikhail Petrov (August 1941 – October 1941), killed in action,
- Major General Arkady Yermakov (October 1941 – November 1941)
- Colonel General Ivan Boldin (November 1941 – February 1945)
- Lieutenant General Fyodor Ozerov (February 1945 to the end of the war)
