= Battle of Kursk =

1943 tank battle in the Soviet Union and the largest tank battle in history

- Part of the Eastern Front of World War II
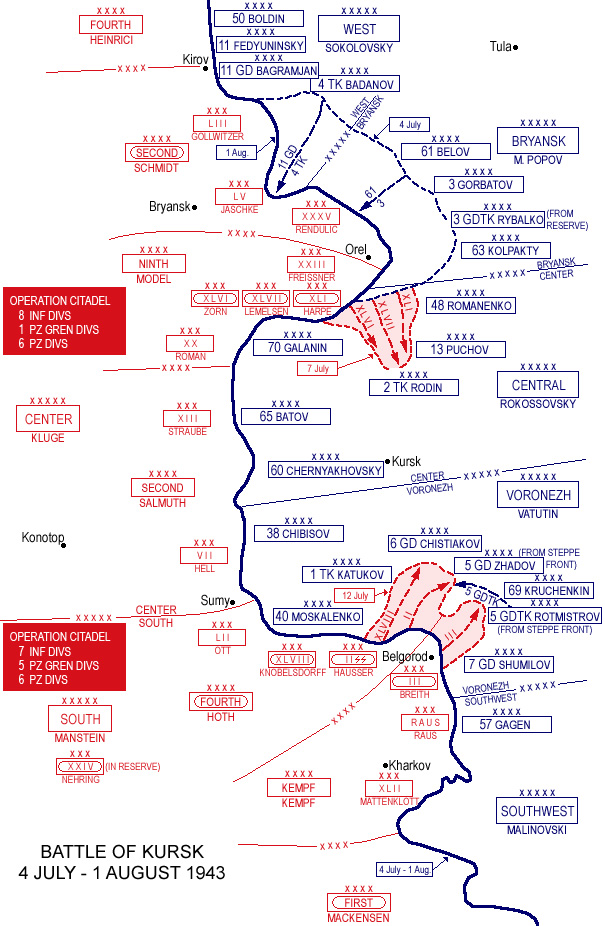
- German penetration during the attack on the Kursk salient and Soviet counter-offensive in the northern sector
Date	5 July – 23 August 1943 (1 month, 2 weeks and 4 days)
Location	Kursk, Kursk Oblast, Russian SFSR, Soviet Union 51.7°N 36.1°E
Result	Soviet victory
Territorial changes	Soviets regain territory along a 2,000 km (1,200 mi) wide front after the battle

Belligerents
Germany: Lokot Autonomy (Note: Some engagements between the Wehrmacht and Red Army during the Battle of Kursk happened in the territory of the Lokot Automony.)	Soviet Union

Commanders and leaders
OKH: Adolf Hitler; Kurt Zeitzler; Army Group Centre: Günther von Kluge; Walter Weiß; Walter Model; Erich Clößner; Army Group South: Erich von Manstein; Hermann Hoth; Werner Kempf; Luftwaffe: Otto Deßloch; Ritter von Greim; Wolfram von Richthofen	Stavka: Joseph Stalin; Georgy Zhukov; Western Front: Vasily Sokolovsky; Ivan Bagramyan; Bryansk Front: Markian Popov; Alexander Gorbatov; Pavel Belov; Central Front: Konstantin Rokossovsky; Ivan Chernyakhovsky; Pavel Batov; Voronezh Front: Nikolai Vatutin; Kirill Moskalenko; Steppe Front: Ivan Konev; Alexey Zhadov

Strength
Operation Citadel: 780,900 men; 2,928 tanks; 9,966 guns and mortars; Soviet counter-offensive phase: 940,900 men; 3,253 tanks; 9,467 guns and mortars; 2,110 aircraft	Operation Citadel: 1,910,361 men (including 1,426,352 combat soldiers); 5,128 tanks; 25,013 guns and mortars; Soviet counter-offensive phase: 2,500,000 men; 7,360 tanks; 47,416 guns and mortars; 2,792 (Note: The breakdown as shown in Bergstrom (2007) is as follows: 1,030 aircraft of 2nd Air Army and 611 of 17th Air Army on the southern sector (Voronezh Front), and 1,151 on the northern sector (Central Front). Bergström 2007, pp. 21, 127–128.) to 3,549 (Note: The breakdown as shown by Zetterling and Frankson is: 1,050 aircraft of 16th Air Army (Central Front), 881 of 2nd Air Army (Voronezh Front), 735 of 17th Air Army (only as a secondary support for Voronezh Front), 563 of the 5th Air Army (Steppe Front) and 320 of Long Range Bomber Command. Zetterling & Frankson 2000, p. 20) aircraft

Casualties and losses
Operation Citadel: (Note: Operation Citadel refers to the German offensive from 4 to 16 July, but Soviet losses are for the period of 5–23 July.); 54,182 men (Note: The breakdown as shown in Frieser is as follows: 9,063 Killed in action, 43,159 Wounded in action and 1,960 Missing in action. Frieser et al 2007, p. 154); 252–323 tanks and assault guns destroyed; 1,612 tanks and assault guns damaged; 159 aircraft; c. 500 guns; Battle of Kursk: (Note: The whole Battle of Kursk refers to the period of the German offensive (Operation Citadel) and the subsequent Soviet counteroffensives, from 4 July to 23 August.); German medical data Total: 165,314 men (Note: Frieser et al: 86,064, of whom 25,515 dead or missing; Belgorod-Kharkov Offensive Operation 25,068 men, of whom 8,933 dead or missing. Frieser et al 2007, pp. 197, 200)–203,000 men; German strength data: ~380,000–430,000 men; Modern Western Estimate: 500,000+ killed, wounded, missing and captured; Matériel Losses: At least 2,952 tanks and assault guns destroyed or damaged (of which 760 (Note: Exact numbers are unknown; the entire German eastern front lost 1,331 tanks and assault guns for July and August, so the number of 760 is an estimate.)–1,200 were destroyed; 40–50% of damaged tanks and assault guns were beyond repair); 681 aircraft (for 5–31 July) (Note: Figures for 5–31 July, as given by the Luftwaffe logistics staff (Generalquartiermeister der Luftwaffe).)–1,300 aircraft (total)	Operation Citadel: 177,847 men; 1,614–1,956 tanks and assault guns destroyed; 459–~1,000 aircraft; Battle of Kursk: 254,470 killed, captured, or missing 608,833 wounded or sick (Note: The breakdown as shown in Krivosheev is: Kursk-defence: 177,847; Orel-counter: 429,890; Belgorod-counter: 255,566. Krivosheev 1997, pp. 132–134); Total: 863,303 men (including 780,000 combat casualties); Matériel Losses: 6,064 (Note: Krivosheev's breakdown is: Kursk-defence; 1,614. Orel-counter; 2,586. Belgorod-counter; 1,864. Krivosheev 1997, p. 262)–7,000 tanks and assault guns destroyed; 1,626–3,300 aircraft; 5,244 guns and mortars

The Battle of Kursk, also called the Battle of the Kursk Salient, was a major World War II Eastern Front battle between the forces of Nazi Germany and the Soviet Union near Kursk in southwestern Russia during the summer of 1943, resulting in a Soviet victory. The Battle of Kursk is the single largest battle in the history of warfare. It ranks only behind the Battle of Stalingrad several months earlier as the most often-cited turning point in the European theatre of the war. It was one of the costliest battles of the Second World War, the single deadliest armoured battle in history. The opening day of the battle, 5 July, was the single costliest day in the history of aerial warfare in terms of aircraft shot down. The battle was further marked by fierce house-to-house fighting and hand-to-hand combat.

The battle began with the launch of the German offensive Operation Citadel (German: Unternehmen Zitadelle), on 5 July, which had the objective of pinching off the Kursk salient with attacks on the base of the salient from north and south simultaneously. After the German offensive stalled on the northern side of the salient, on 12 July, the Soviets commenced their Kursk Strategic Offensive Operation with the launch of Operation Kutuzov (Russian: Кутузов) against the rear of the German forces on the same side. On the southern side, the Soviets also launched powerful counterattacks the same day, one of which led to a large armoured clash, the Battle of Prokhorovka. On 3 August, the Soviets began the second phase of the Kursk Strategic Offensive Operation with the launch of the Belgorod–Kharkov offensive operation (Operation Polkovodets Rumyantsev, Полководец Румянцев) against the German forces on the southern side of the salient.

The Germans hoped to weaken the Soviet offensive potential for the summer of 1943, by cutting off and enveloping the forces that they anticipated would be in the Kursk salient. Hitler believed that a victory here would reassert German strength and improve his prestige with his allies, who he thought were considering withdrawing from the war. It was also hoped that large numbers of Soviet prisoners would be captured to be used as slave labour in the German armaments industry. The Soviet government had foreknowledge of the German plans from the Lucy spy ring. Aware months in advance that the attack would fall on the neck of the Kursk salient, the Soviets built a defence in depth designed to wear down the German armoured spearhead. The Germans delayed the offensive while they tried to build up their forces and waited for new weapons, giving the Red Army time to construct a series of deep defensive belts and establish a large reserve force for counter-offensives, with one German officer describing Kursk as "another Verdun".

The battle was the final strategic offensive that the Germans were able to launch on the Eastern Front. Because the Allied invasion of Sicily began during the battle, Adolf Hitler was forced to divert troops training in France to meet the Allied threat in the Mediterranean, rather than using them as a strategic reserve for the Eastern Front. As a result, Hitler cancelled the offensive at Kursk after only a week, in part to divert forces to Italy. Germany's heavy losses of men and tanks ensured that the victorious Soviet Red Army held a strategic initiative for the rest of the war. The Battle of Kursk was the first time in the Second World War that a German strategic offensive was halted before it could break through enemy defences and penetrate to its strategic depths. Though the Red Army had succeeded in winter offensives previously, their counter-offensives after the German attack at Kursk were their first successful summer offensives of the war. The battle has been called the "last gasp of Nazi aggression".

== Background ==
As the Battle of Stalingrad slowly ground to its conclusion, the Red Army moved to a general offensive in the south, in Operation Little Saturn. By January 1943, a 160-to-300-kilometre-wide (99 to 186 mi) gap had opened between German Army Group B and Army Group Don, and the advancing Soviet armies threatened to cut off all German forces south of the Don River, including Army Group A operating in the Caucasus. Army Group Center came under significant pressure as well. Kursk was retaken by the Soviets on 8 February 1943, and Rostov on 14 February. The Soviet Bryansk, Western, and newly created Central Fronts prepared for an offensive which envisioned the encirclement of Army Group Centre between Bryansk and Smolensk. By February 1943 the southern sector of the German front was in strategic crisis.

Since December 1942, Field Marshal Erich von Manstein had been strongly requesting "unrestricted operational freedom" to allow him to use his forces in a fluid manner. On 6 February 1943, Manstein met with Hitler at his headquarters in Görlitz (now Gierłoż, Poland) to discuss the proposals he had previously sent. He received approval from Hitler for a counteroffensive against the Soviet forces advancing in the Donbas region. On 12 February 1943, the remaining German forces were reorganised. To the south, Army Group Don was renamed Army Group South and placed under Manstein's command. Directly to the north, Army Group B was dissolved, with its forces and areas of responsibility divided between Army Group South and Army Group Centre. Manstein inherited responsibility for the massive breach in the German lines. On 18 February, Hitler arrived at Army Group South headquarters at Zaporizhia just hours before the Soviets liberated Kharkov, and had to be hastily evacuated on the 19th.

Once given freedom of action, Manstein intended to utilise his forces to make a series of counterstrokes into the flanks of the Soviet armoured formations, with the goal of destroying them while retaking Kharkov and Kursk. The II SS Panzer Corps had arrived from France in January 1943, refitted and up to near full strength. Armoured units from the 1st Panzer Army of Army Group A had pulled out of the Caucasus and further strengthened Manstein's forces.

The operation was hastily prepared and did not receive a name. Later known as the Third Battle of Kharkov, it commenced on 21 February, as the 4th Panzer Army under General Hoth launched a counter-attack. The German forces cut off the Soviet mobile spearheads and continued the drive north, retaking Kharkov on 15 March and Belgorod on 18 March. A Soviet offensive launched on 25 February by the Central Front against Army Group Centre had to be abandoned by 7 March to allow the attacking formations to disengage and redeploy to the south to counter the threat of the advancing German forces under Manstein. Exhaustion of both the Wehrmacht and the Red Army, coupled with the loss of mobility due to the onset of the spring rasputitsa, resulted in the cessation of operations for both sides by mid-March. The counteroffensive left a Soviet salient extending 250 kilometres (160 mi) from north to south and 160 kilometres (99 mi) from east to west into the German area of control, centred on the city of Kursk.

=== German plans and preparation ===
German plan of attack. Coloured areas show the position on 4 July, arrows the planned direction of German attacks, broken lines the division between German army groups and Soviet fronts, and circled areas the approximate location of Soviet reserves.

The heavy losses sustained by Germany since the opening of Operation Barbarossa had resulted in a shortage in infantry and artillery. Units were in total 470,000 men understrength. For the Wehrmacht to undertake an offensive in 1943, the burden of the offensive, in both attacking the Soviet defences and holding ground on the flanks of the advance, would have to be carried primarily by the panzer divisions. On 10 March, Manstein presented a plan whereby the German forces would pinch off the Kursk salient with a rapid offensive commencing as soon as the spring rasputitsa had subsided.

On 13 March, Hitler signed Operational Order No. 5, which authorised several offensives, including one against the Kursk salient. As the last Soviet resistance in Kharkov petered out, Manstein attempted to persuade Günther von Kluge, commander of Army Group Centre, to immediately attack the Central Front, which was defending the northern face of the salient. Kluge refused, believing that his forces were too weak to launch such an attack. Further Axis advances were blocked by Soviet forces that had been shifted down from the Central Front to the area north of Belgorod. By mid-April, amid poor weather and with the German forces exhausted and in need of refitting, the offensives of Operational Order No. 5 were postponed.

On 15 April, Hitler issued Operational Order No. 6, which called for the Kursk offensive operation, codenamed Zitadelle ("Citadel"), to begin on 3 May or shortly thereafter. The directive was drafted by Kurt Zeitzler, the OKH Chief of Staff. For the offensive to succeed it was deemed essential to attack before the Soviets had a chance to prepare extensive defences or to launch an offensive of their own. Some military historians have described the operation using the term Blitzkrieg (lightning war); other military historians do not use the term in their works on the battle. (Note: Some that consider Operation Citadel as envisioning a blitzkrieg attack or state it was intended as such are: Lloyd Clark, Roger Moorhouse, David Glantz, Jonathan House, Hedley Paul Willmott. Niklas Zetterling and Anders Frankson specifically considered only the southern pincer as a "classical blitzkrieg attack". In the informal setting of the International Conference on World War II at The National WWII Museum in 2013, Robert M. Citino used the term to comment on the failure of the operation: "The operation misfired from the start. There was no strategic breakthrough—no "blitzkrieg", no war of movement. Instead it turned into World War I with tanks". In The Wehrmacht Retreats: Fighting a Lost War, 1943 (2012), Citino did not use the term "blitzkrieg", instead describing Citadel as an attempted operation in the classical tradition of Bewegungskrieg (literally: "war of movement", or maneuver warfare), culminating in a Kesselschlacht (literally: "cauldron battle", or battle of encirclement). Historians Steven Newton and Dieter Brand do not use 'blitzkrieg' in their characterization of the operation.)

Operation Citadel called for a double envelopment to surround the Soviet defenders of five armies and seal off the Kursk salient. Army Group Centre would provide General Walter Model's 9th Army to form the northern pincer. It would cut through the northern face of the salient, driving south to the hills east of Kursk, securing the rail line from Soviet attack. Army Group South would commit the 4th Panzer Army, under Hermann Hoth, and Army Detachment Kempf, under Werner Kempf, to pierce the southern face of the salient. This force would drive north to meet the 9th Army east of Kursk. Manstein's main attack was to be delivered by Hoth's 4th Panzer Army, spearheaded by the II SS Panzer Corps under Paul Hausser. The XLVIII Panzer Corps, commanded by Otto von Knobelsdorff, would advance on the left while Army Detachment Kempf would advance on the right. The 2nd Army, under the command of Walter Weiss, would contain the western portion of the salient.

On 27 April, Model met with Hitler to review and express his concern regarding intelligence which showed the Red Army constructing very strong positions at the shoulders of the salient and having withdrawn their mobile forces from the area west of Kursk. He argued that the longer the preparation phase continued, the less the operation could be justified. He recommended completely abandoning Citadel, allowing the army to await and defeat the coming Soviet offensive, or radically revising the plan for Citadel. Though in mid-April, Manstein had considered the Citadel offensive profitable, by May he shared Model's misgivings.

Hitler called his senior officers and advisors to Munich for a meeting on 4 May. Hitler spoke for about 45 minutes on the reasons to postpone the attack, essentially reiterating Model's arguments. A number of options were put forth for comment: going on the offensive immediately with the forces at hand; delaying the offensive further to await the arrival of new and better tanks; radically revising the operation, or cancelling it altogether. Manstein advocated an early attack, but requested two additional infantry divisions, to which Hitler responded that none were available. Kluge spoke out strongly against postponement and discounted Model's intelligence. Albert Speer, the minister of Armaments and War Production, spoke about the difficulties of rebuilding the armoured formations and the limitations of German industry to replace losses. General Heinz Guderian argued strongly against the operation, stating "the attack was pointless". The conference ended without Hitler coming to a decision, but Citadel was not aborted. Three days later, OKW, Hitler's conduit for controlling the military, postponed the launch date for Citadel to 12 June.

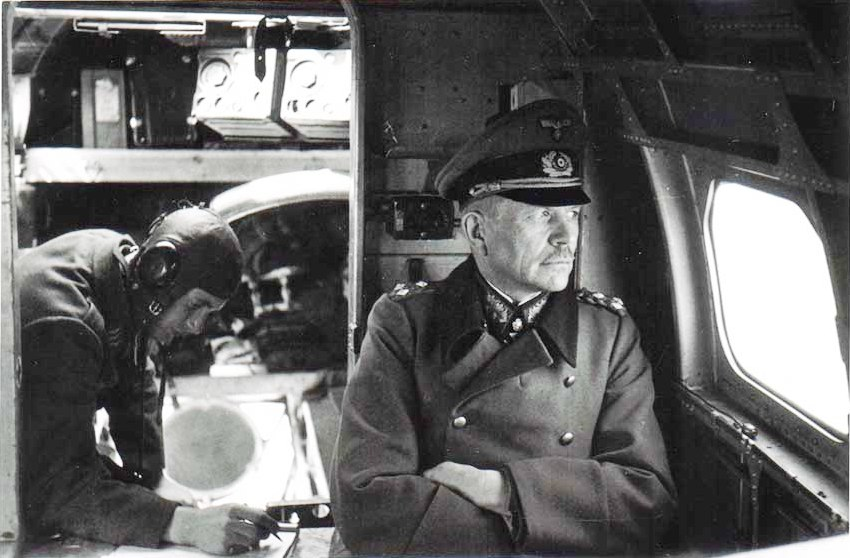
Guderian being transported to the Eastern Front, 1943

Following this meeting, Guderian continued to voice his concerns over an operation that would likely degrade the panzer forces that he had been attempting to rebuild. He considered the offensive, as planned, to be a misuse of the panzer forces, as it violated two of the three tenets he had laid out as the essential elements for a successful panzer attack – surprise, deployment in mass, and suitable terrain. (Note: Guderian developed and advocated the strategy of concentrating armoured formations at the point of attack (Schwerpunkt) and deep penetration. In Achtung – Panzer! he listed three elements: surprise, deployment in mass, and suitable terrain. Of these, surprise was by far the most important.) In his opinion, the limited German resources in men and materiel should be conserved, as they would be needed for the pending defence of western Europe. In a meeting with Hitler on 10 May he asked,

Is it really necessary to attack Kursk, and indeed in the east this year at all? Do you think anyone even knows where Kursk is? The entire world doesn't care if we capture Kursk or not. What is the reason that is forcing us to attack this year on Kursk, or even more, on the Eastern Front?

Hitler replied, "I know. The thought of it turns my stomach." Guderian concluded, "In that case your reaction to the problem is the correct one. Leave it alone." (Note: Writing after the war, in his autobiography Panzer Leader, "I urged him earnestly to give up the plan of attack. The great commitment certainly would not bring us equivalent gains.")

Despite reservations, Hitler remained committed to the offensive. He and the OKW, early in the preparatory phase, were hopeful that the offensive would revitalise German strategic fortunes in the east. As the challenges offered by Citadel increased, he focused more and more on the expected new weapons that he believed were the key to victory: principally the Panther tank, but also the Ferdinand tank destroyer and greater numbers of the Tiger heavy tank. He postponed the operation in order to await their arrival. Receiving reports of powerful Soviet concentrations behind the Kursk area, Hitler further delayed the offensive to allow for more equipment to reach the front.

With pessimism for Citadel increasing with each delay, in June, Alfred Jodl, the Chief of Staff at the OKW, instructed the armed forces propaganda office to portray the upcoming operation as a limited counteroffensive. Due to concerns of an Allied landing in the south of France or in Italy and delays in deliveries of the new tanks, Hitler postponed again, this time to 20 June. (Note: Source includes: German Nation Archive microfilm publication T78, Records of the German High Command (Oberkommando der Wehrmacht) Roll 343, Frames 6301178–180, which confirms Hitler's teleprinter messages to Rommel about reinforcing southern Italy with armoured forces that were already destined to be used for Citadel.) Zeitzler was profoundly concerned with the delays, but he still supported the offensive. On 17–18 June, following a discussion in which the OKW Operations Staff suggested abandoning the offensive, Hitler further postponed the operation until 3 July, then, on 1 July, Hitler announced 5 July as the launch date of the offensive.

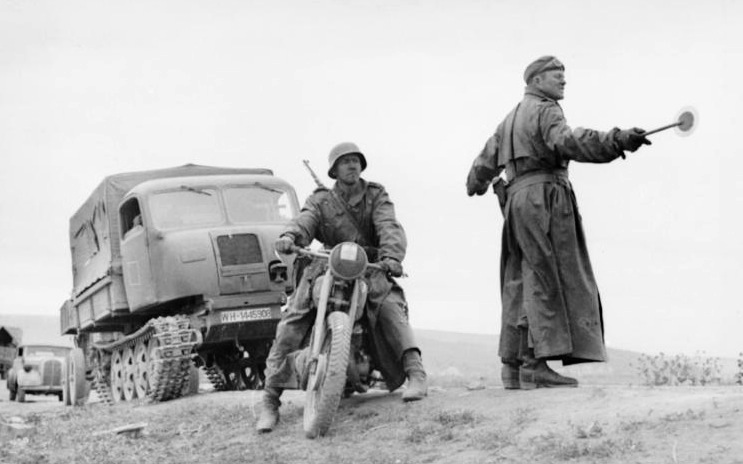
A Raupenschlepper Ost, designed in response to the poor roads of Russia, moves materiel up shortly before the Kursk offensive.

A three-month quiet period had descended upon the Eastern Front as the Soviets prepared their defences and the Germans attempted to build up their forces. The Germans used this period for specialised training of their assault troops. All units underwent training and combat rehearsals. The Waffen-SS had built a full-scale duplicate Soviet strong point that was used to practice the techniques for neutralizing such positions. The panzer divisions received replacement men and equipment and attempted to get back up to strength. The German forces to be used in the offensive included 12 panzer divisions and 5 Panzergrenadier divisions, four of which had tank strengths greater than their neighbouring panzer divisions. However, the force was markedly deficient in infantry divisions, which were essential to hold ground and to secure the flanks. By the time the Germans initiated the offensive, their force amounted to around 777,000 men, 2,451 tanks and assault guns (70 percent of the German armour on the Eastern Front) and 7,417 guns and mortars. (Note: According to Zetterling and Frankson these figures are for 1 July 1943 and accounts for only units that eventually fought in Operation Citadel (4th Panzer Army, part of Army Detachment "Kempf", 2nd Army and 9th Army). The figure for German manpower refers to ration strength (which includes non-combatants and wounded soldiers still in medical installations). The figures for guns and mortars are estimates based on the strength and number of units slated for the operation; the figure for tanks and assault guns include those in workshops. Zetterling & Frankson 2000, p. 18) The Battle of Kursk would engulf more than 70% of Germany's military force on the Eastern Front.

=== Soviet plans and preparation ===
In 1943, an offensive by the Soviet Central, Bryansk and Western Fronts against Army Group Centre was abandoned shortly after it began in early March, when the southern flank of the Central Front was threatened by Army Group South. Soviet intelligence received information about German troop concentrations spotted at Orel and Kharkov, as well as details of an intended German offensive in the Kursk sector through the Lucy spy ring in Switzerland. The Soviets verified the intelligence via their spy in Britain, John Cairncross, at the Government Code and Cypher School at Bletchley Park, who clandestinely forwarded raw decrypts directly to Moscow. Cairncross also provided Soviet intelligence with identifications of the Luftwaffe airfields in the region. Soviet politician Anastas Mikoyan wrote that on 27 March 1943, Soviet leader Joseph Stalin notified him of a possible German attack in the Kursk sector. Stalin and some senior officers were eager to strike first once the rasputitsa ended, but a number of key officers, including Deputy Supreme Commander Georgiy Zhukov, recommended a strategic defensive before going on the offensive. In a letter to the Stavka and Stalin, on 8 April, Zhukov wrote:

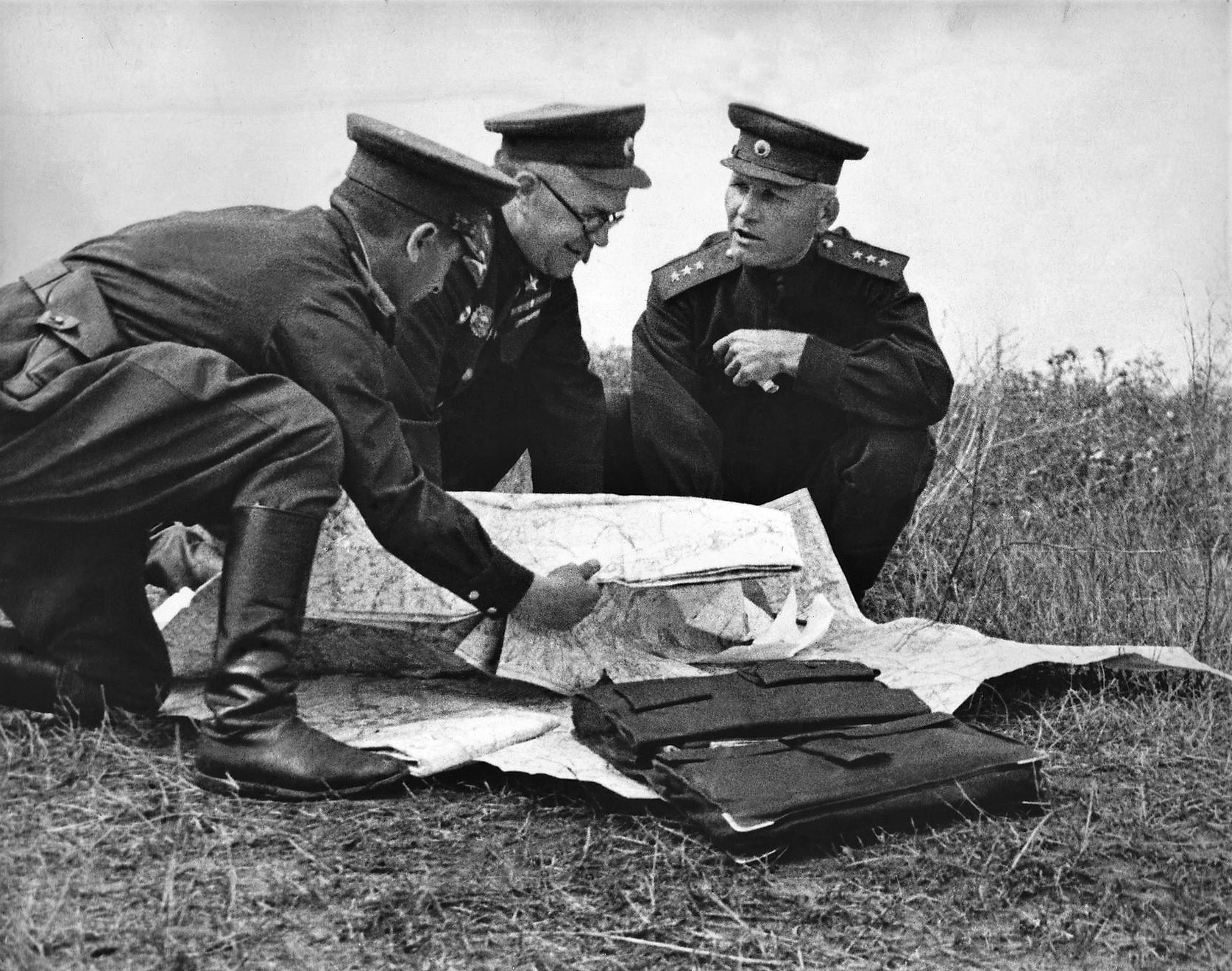
Zhukov with Ivan Konev, commander of the Steppe Front, during the Battle of Kursk

In the first phase the enemy, collecting their best forces—including 13–15 tank divisions and with the support of a large number of aircraft—will strike Kursk with their Kromskom-Orel grouping from the north-east and their Belgorod-Kharkov grouping from the south-east... I consider it inadvisable for our forces to go over to an offensive in the near future in order to forestall the enemy. It would be better to make the enemy exhaust himself against our defences, and knock out his tanks and then, bringing up fresh reserves, to go over to the general offensive which would finally finish off his main force.

Stalin consulted with his frontline commanders and senior officers of the General Staff from 12 to 15 April 1943. In the end he and the Stavka agreed that the Germans would probably target Kursk. Stalin believed the decision to defend would give the Germans the initiative, but Zhukov countered that the Germans would be drawn into a trap where their armoured power would be destroyed, thus creating the conditions for a major Soviet counteroffensive. They decided to meet the enemy attack by preparing defensive positions to wear out the German groupings before launching their own offensive. Preparation of defences and fortifications began by the end of April, and continued until the German attack in early July. The two-month delay between the German decision to attack the Kursk salient and its implementation allowed the Red Army ample time to thoroughly prepare.

The Voronezh Front, commanded by Nikolai Vatutin, was tasked with defending the southern face of the salient. The Central Front, commanded by Konstantin Rokossovsky, defended the northern face. Waiting in reserve was the Steppe Front, commanded by Ivan Konev. In February 1943, the Central Front had been reconstructed from the Don Front, which had been part of the northern pincer of Operation Uranus and had been responsible for the destruction of the 6th Army at Stalingrad.

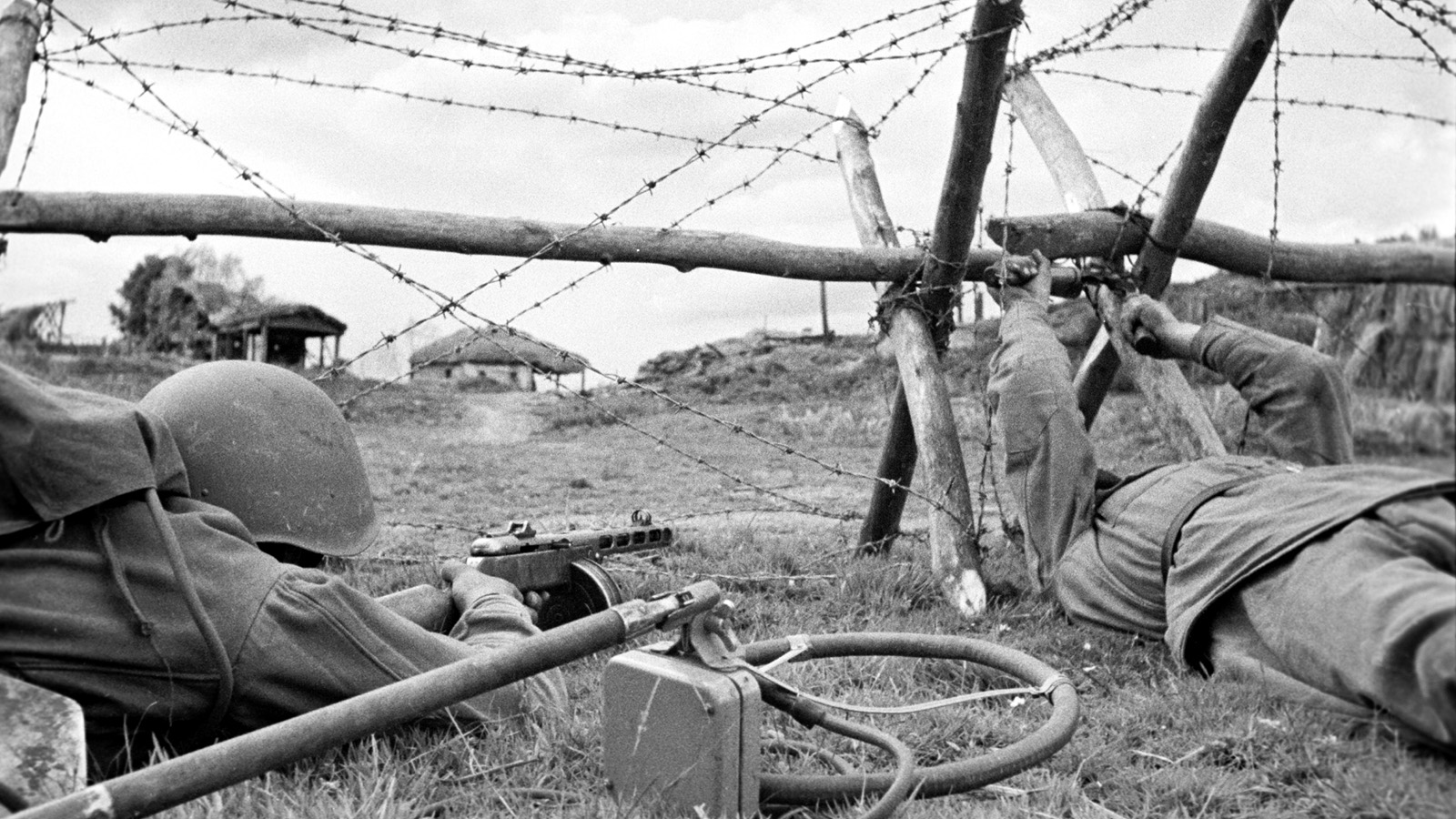
Soviet sappers of the Central Front cutting barbed wire, June 1943

The Central and Voronezh Fronts each constructed three main defensive belts in their sectors, with each subdivided into several zones of fortification. The Soviets employed the labour of over 300,000 civilians. (Note: Over 105,000 in April and as much as 300,000 in June. Zetterling & Frankson 2000, p. 22.) Fortifying each belt was an interconnected web of minefields, barbed-wire fences, anti-tank ditches, deep entrenchments for infantry, anti-tank obstacles, dug-in armoured vehicles, and machine-gun bunkers. Behind the three main defensive belts were three more belts prepared as fallback positions; the first was not fully occupied or heavily fortified, and the last two, though sufficiently fortified, were unoccupied with the exception of a small area in the immediate environs of Kursk. The combined depth of the three main defensive zones was about 40 kilometres (25 mi). The six defensive belts on either side of Kursk were 130–150 kilometres (81–93 mi) deep. If the Germans managed to break through these defences they would still be confronted by additional defensive belts to the east, manned by the Steppe Front. These brought the total depth of the defences to nearly 300 kilometres (190 mi).

The Voronezh and Central Fronts dug 4,200 kilometres (2,600 mi) and 5,000 kilometres (3,100 mi) of trenches respectively, laid out in a criss-cross pattern for ease of movement. The Soviets built more than 686 bridges and about 2,000 kilometres (1,200 mi) of roads in the salient. Red Army combat engineers laid 503,993 anti-tank mines and 439,348 anti-personnel mines, with the highest concentration in the first main defensive belt. The minefields at Kursk achieved densities of 2,500 anti-personnel and 2,200 anti-tank mines per kilometre, six times the density used in the defence of Moscow. For example, the 6th Guards Army of the Voronezh Front, was spread out over nearly 64 kilometres (40 mi) of front and was protected by 69,688 anti-tank and 64,430 anti-personnel mines in its first defensive belt with a further 20,200 anti-tank and 9,097 anti-personnel mines in its second defensive belt. Furthermore, mobile obstacle detachments were tasked with laying more mines directly in the path of advancing enemy armoured formations. These units, consisting of two platoons of combat engineers with mines at division level and one company of combat engineers normally equipped with 500–700 mines at corps level, functioned as anti-tank reserves at every level of command.

In a letter dated 8 April, General Zhukov warned that the Germans would attack the salient with a strong armoured force:

We can expect the enemy to put [the] greatest reliance in this year's offensive operations on his tank divisions and air force, since his infantry appears to be far less prepared for offensive operations than last year ... In view of this threat, we should strengthen the anti-tank defences of the Central and Voronezh fronts, and assemble as soon as possible.

Nearly all artillery, including howitzers, guns, anti-aircraft and rockets, were tasked with anti-tank defence. Dug-in tanks and self-propelled guns further strengthened the anti-tank defences. Anti-tank forces were incorporated into every level of command, mostly as anti-tank strong points with the majority concentrated on likely attack routes and the remainder amply spread out elsewhere. Each anti-tank strong-point typically consisted of four to six anti-tank guns, six to nine anti-tank rifles, and five to seven heavy and light machine guns. They were supported by mobile obstacle detachments as well as by infantry with automatic firearms. Independent tank and self-propelled gun brigades and regiments were tasked with cooperating with the infantry during counterattacks.

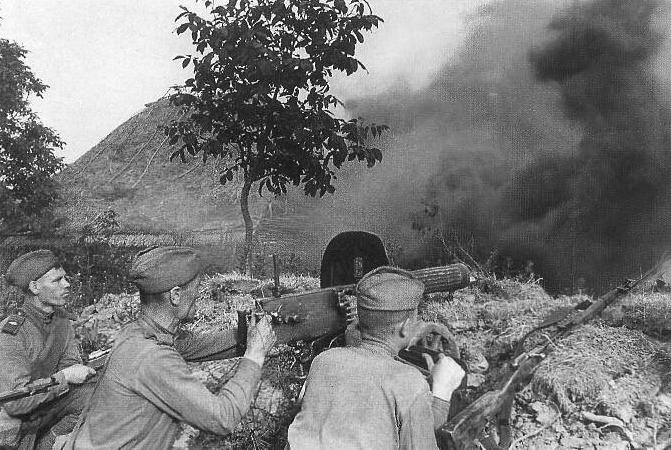
A Soviet machine gun crew during the Battle of Kursk

Soviet preparations also included increased activity of Soviet partisans, who attacked German communications and supply lines. The attacks were mostly behind Army Group North and Army Group Centre. In June 1943, partisans operating in the occupied area behind Army Group Centre destroyed 298 locomotives, 1,222 railway wagons and 44 bridges, and in the Kursk sector there were 1,092 partisan attacks on railways. These attacks delayed the build-up of German supplies and equipment, and required the diversion of German troops to suppress the partisans, delaying their training for the offensive. Central Partisan Headquarters coordinated many of these attacks. In June Soviet Air Forces (VVS) flew over 800 sorties at night to resupply the partisan groups operating behind Army Group Centre. The VVS also provided communication and sometimes even daylight air-support for major partisan operations.

Special training was provided to the Soviet infantry manning the defences to help them overcome the tank phobia that had been evident since the start of the German invasion. Soldiers were packed into trenches and tanks were driven overhead until all signs of fear were gone. (Note: Nikolai Litvin, a Soviet anti-tank gunner present at the battle of Kursk, recalls his experience during the special training to overcome tank phobia. "The tanks continued to advance closer and closer. Some comrades became frightened, leaped out of the trenches, and began to run away. The commander saw who was running and quickly forced them back into the trenches, making it sternly clear that they had to stay put. The tanks reached the trench line and, with a terrible roar, clattered overhead ... it was possible to conceal oneself in a trench from a tank, let it pass right over you, and remain alive.") This training exercise was referred to by the soldiers as "ironing". In combat, the soldiers would spring up in the midst of the attacking infantry to separate them from the spearheading armoured vehicles. The separated armoured vehicles – now vulnerable to infantry armed with PTRD-41 anti-tank rifles, demolition charges and molotov cocktails – could then be disabled or destroyed at point-blank range. These types of attacks were mostly effective against the Ferdinand tank destroyers, which lacked machine guns as secondary armament. The soldiers were also promised financial rewards for each tank destroyed, with the People's Commissariat of Defence providing a bounty of 1,000 roubles for each destroyed tank.

The Soviets employed maskirovka (military deception) to mask defensive positions and troop dispositions and to conceal the movement of men and materiel. These included camouflaging gun emplacements, constructing dummy airfields and depots, generating false radio-traffic, and spreading rumours among the Soviet frontline troops and the civilian population in the German-held areas. Movement of forces and supplies to and from the salient took place at night only. Ammunition caches were carefully concealed to blend in with the landscape. Radio transmission was restricted and fires were forbidden. Command posts were hidden and motor transport in and around them forbidden.

According to a Soviet General Staff report, 29 of the 35 major Luftwaffe raids on Soviet airfields in the Kursk sector in June 1943 were against dummy airfields. According to historian Antony Beevor, in contrast, Soviet aviation apparently succeeded in destroying more than 500 Luftwaffe aircraft on the ground. The Soviet deception efforts were so successful that German estimates issued in mid-June placed the total Soviet armoured strength at 1,500 tanks. The result was not only a vast underestimation of Soviet strength, but a misperception of Soviet strategic intentions.

The main tank of the Soviet tank arm was the T-34 medium tank, on which the Red Army attempted to concentrate production. The tank arm also contained large numbers of the T-70 light tank. For example, the 5th Guards Tank Army roughly contained 270 T-70s and 500 T-34s. In the salient itself, the Soviets assembled a large number of lend-lease tanks. These included U.S.-manufactured M3 Lee medium tanks and British-built Churchill, Matilda II and Valentine infantry tanks. However, the T-34 made up the bulk of the Soviet armour. Without including the deeper reserves organised under the Steppe Front, the Soviets massed about 1,300,000 men, 3,600 tanks, 20,000 artillery pieces and 2,792 aircraft to defend the salient. This amounted to 26 percent of the total manpower of the Red Army, 26 percent of its mortars and artillery, 35 percent of its aircraft and 46 percent of its tanks. One source states that in the Battle of Stalingrad the Soviets used fourteen field armies and one tank army, while at Kursk they used twenty-two full-strength field armies and five tank armies. According to one source, the Soviets concentrated 80% of their entire air fleet for use at the Battle of Kursk. According to some historians, the Soviets employed 40% of their manpower and 75% of their armoured forces to the battle.

=== Contest for aerial supremacy ===
By 1943 the Luftwaffe's strength on the Eastern Front had started to weaken after Stalingrad, and the siphoning of resources to North Africa. The Luftwaffe forces in the east were further depleted with fighter units being shifted back to Germany to defend against the escalating Allied bombing campaign. By the end of June, only 38.7 percent of the Luftwaffe's total aircraft remained in the east. In 1943 the Luftwaffe could still achieve local aerial superiority by concentrating its forces. The majority of German aircraft left available on the Eastern Front were slated for Citadel. The goal of the Luftwaffe remained unchanged. The priority was to gain aerial supremacy, then to isolate the battlefield from enemy reinforcements, and finally, once the critical point had been reached in the land battle, to render close air support.

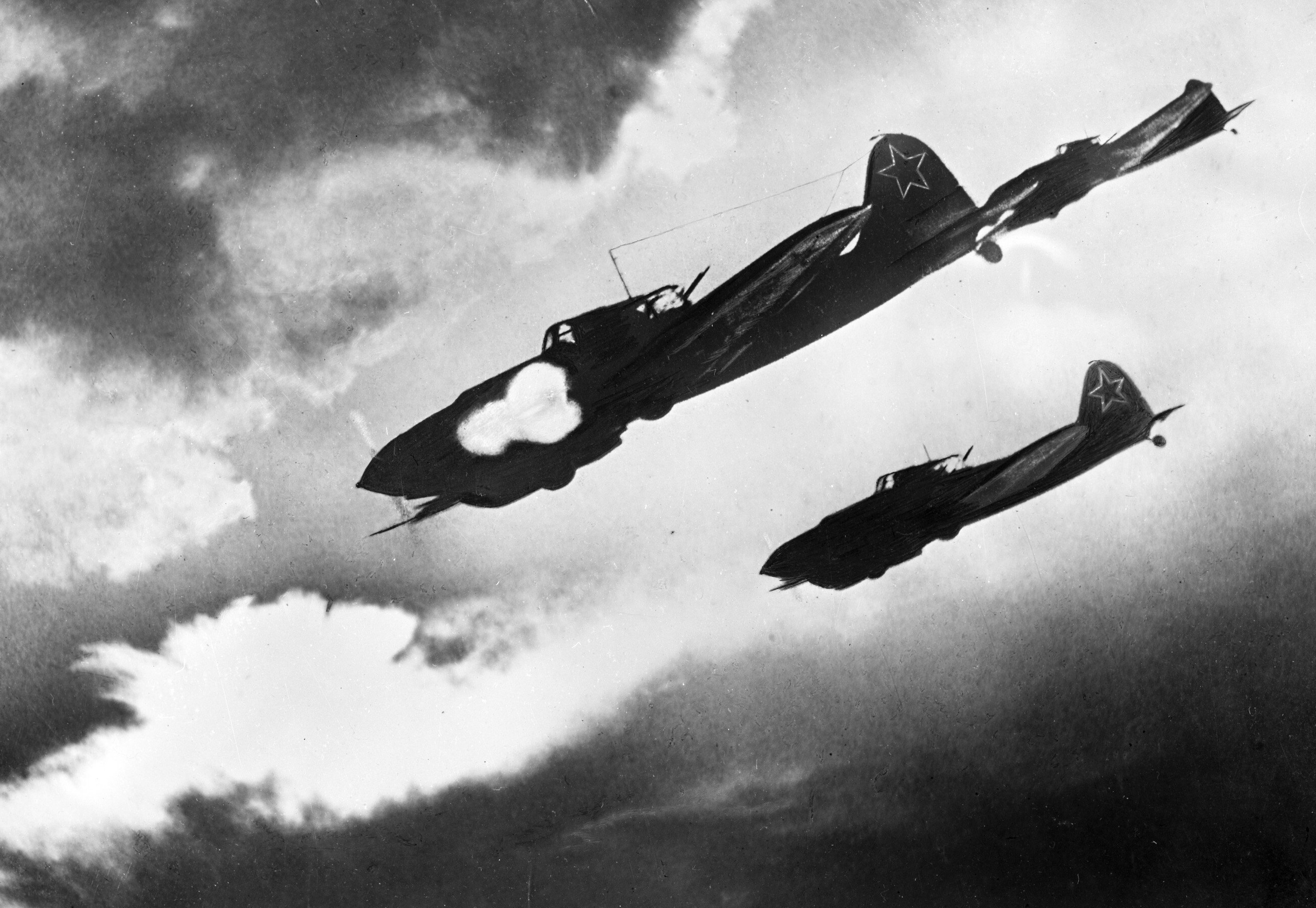
VVS Ilyushin Il-2 ground attack aircraft during the battle of Kursk

The changing strengths between the two opponents prompted the Luftwaffe to make operational changes for the battle. Previous offensive campaigns had been initiated with Luftwaffe raids against opposing airfields to achieve aerial superiority. By this point in the war Red Army equipment reserves were extensive and the Luftwaffe commanders realised that aircraft could be easily replaced, making such raids futile. Therefore, this mission was abandoned. In addition, previous campaigns had made use of medium bombers flying well behind the frontline to block the arrival of reinforcements. This mission, however, was rarely attempted during Citadel.

The Luftwaffe command understood that their support would be crucial for the success of Citadel, but problems with supply shortfalls hampered their preparations. Partisan activity, particularly behind Army Group Center, slowed the rate of re-supply and cut short the Luftwaffe's ability to build up essential stockpiles of petrol, oil, lubricants, engines, munitions, and unlike Red Army units there were no reserves of aircraft that could be used to replace damaged aircraft over the course of the operation. Fuel was the most significant limiting factor. To help build up supplies for the support of Citadel, the Luftwaffe greatly curtailed its operations during the last week of June. Despite this conservation of resources, the Luftwaffe did not have the resources to sustain an intensive air effort for more than a few days after the operation began.

For Citadel, the Luftwaffe confined its operations to the direct support of the forces on the ground. In this mission the Luftwaffe continued to make use of the Junkers Ju 87 "Stuka" dive-bombers. A new development to this aircraft was the "Bordkanone" 3,7 cm cannon, one of which could be slung under each wing of the Stuka in a gun pod. Half of the Stuka groups assigned to support Citadel were equipped with these Kanonenvogel (literally "cannon-bird") tankbuster aircraft. The air groups were also strengthened by the recent arrival of the Henschel Hs 129, with its 30 mm MK 103 cannon, and the F-subtype ground attack ("jabo") version of the Focke-Wulf Fw 190.

In the months preceding the battle, Luftflotte 6 supporting Army Group Center noted a marked increase in the strength of the opposing VVS formations. The VVS formations encountered displayed better training, and were flying improved equipment with greater aggressiveness and skill than the Luftwaffe had seen earlier. The introduction of the Yakovlev Yak-9 and Lavochkin La-5 fighters gave the Soviet pilots near parity with the Luftwaffe in terms of equipment. Furthermore, large numbers of ground-attack aircraft, such as the Ilyushin Il-2 "Shturmovik" and the Pe-2, had become available as well. The VVS also fielded large numbers of aircraft supplied via lend-lease. Huge stockpiles of supplies and ample reserves of replacement aircraft meant the Red Army and VVS formations would be able to conduct an extended campaign without slackening in the intensity of their effort.

== Opposing forces ==
=== Germans ===
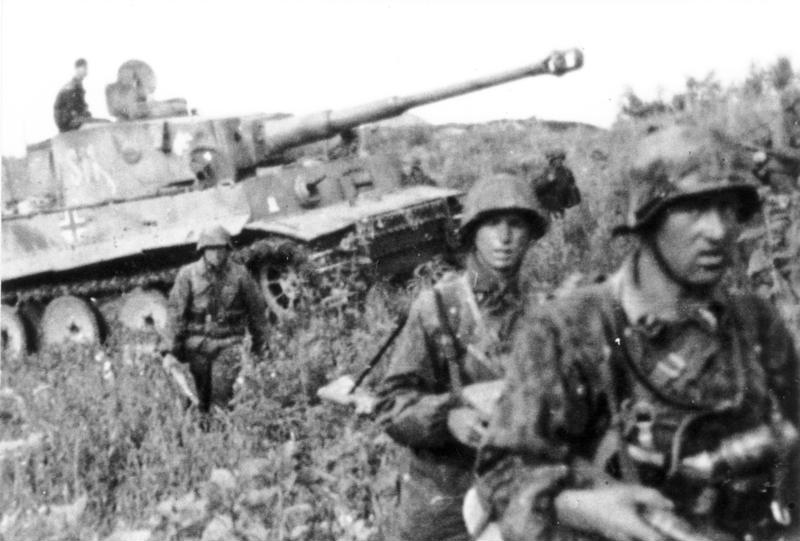
Troops of the Waffen-SS Panzer Division Das Reich with a Tiger I tank, in June 1943 before the battle

For the operation, the Germans used four armies along with a large portion of their total tank strength on the Eastern Front. On 1 July, the 9th Army of Army Group Centre based in the northern side of the salient contained 335,000 men (223,000 combat soldiers); in the south, the 4th Panzer Army and Army Detachment "Kempf", of Army Group South, had 223,907 men (149,271 combat soldiers) and 100,000–108,000 men (66,000 combat soldiers) respectively. The 2nd Army, that held the western side of the salient contained an estimated 110,000. In total, the German forces had a total strength of 777,000–779,000 men, and the three attacking armies contained 438,271 combat soldiers. Army Group South was equipped with more armoured vehicles, infantry and artillery than the 9th Army of Army Group Center. The 4th Panzer Army and Army Detachment "Kempf" had 1,377 tanks and assault guns, while the 9th Army possessed 988 tanks and assault guns.

German industry produced 2,816 tanks and self-propelled guns between April and June, of which 156 were Tigers and 484 Panthers. At Kursk, a total of 259 Panther tanks, about 211 Tigers, and 90 Ferdinands were used.

The two new Panther battalions – the 51st and 52nd – together equipped with 200 Panthers, for which the offensive had been delayed, were attached to the Großdeutschland Division in the XLVIII Panzer Corps of Army Group South. With the 51st and 52nd Battalions arriving on 30 June and 1 July, the two units had little time to perform reconnaissance or to orient themselves to the terrain they found themselves in. This was a breach of the methods of the Panzerwaffe, considered essential for the successful use of armour. Though led by experienced panzer commanders, many of the tank crews were new recruits and had little time to become familiar with their new tanks, let alone train together to function as a unit. The two battalions came direct from the training ground and lacked combat experience. In addition, the requirement to maintain radio silence until the start of the attack meant that the Panther units had little training in battalion-level radio procedures. Furthermore, the new Panthers were still experiencing problems with their transmissions, and proved mechanically unreliable. By the morning of 5 July, the units had lost 16 Panthers due to mechanical breakdown, leaving only 184 available for the launching of the offensive.

July and August 1943 saw the heaviest German ammunition expenditure on the Eastern Front up to that point, with 236,915 tons consumed in July and 254,648 in August. The previous peak had been 160,645 tons in September 1942.

Order of battle: Army Group Centre (Field Marshal Günther von Kluge)
Army	Army commander	Note	Corps	Corps commander	Divisions
9th Army	Walter Model		XX Army Corps	Rudolf Freiherr von Roman	45th, 72nd, 137th, and 251st Infantry Divisions
			XLVI Panzer Corps	Hans Zorn	7th, 31st, 102nd, and 258th Infantry Divisions
			XLI Panzer Corps	Josef Harpe	18th Panzer Division; 86th and 292nd Infantry Divisions
			XLVII Panzer Corps	Joachim Lemelsen	2nd, 9th, and 20th Panzer Divisions; 6th Infantry Division
			XXIII Army Corps	Johannes Frießner	216th and 383rd Infantry Divisions; 78th Assault Division
			Army Reserve		4th and 12th Panzer Divisions; 10th Panzergrenadier Division
2nd Panzer Army	Erich-Heinrich Clößner		XXXV Army Corps	Lothar Rendulic	34th, 56th, 262nd, and 299th Infantry Divisions
			LIII Army Corps	Friedrich Gollwitzer	208th, 211th, and 293rd Infantry Divisions; 25th Panzergrenadier Division
			LV Army Corps	Erich Jaschke	110th, 112th, 134th, 296th, and 339th Infantry Divisions
			Army reserve		5th Panzer Division
Army Group Reserve					8th Panzer Division (joined 2nd Panzer Army on 12 July 1943)
Luftflotte 6					I Flieger Division

Order of battle: Army Group South (Field Marshal Erich von Manstein)
Army	Army commander	Note	Corps	Corps commander	Divisions
4th Panzer Army	Hermann Hoth		LII Army Corps	General Eugen Ott	57th, 255th, and 332nd Infantry Divisions
			XLVIII Panzer Corps	Otto von Knobelsdorff	3rd and 11th Panzer Divisions; 167th Infantry Division; Panzergrenadier Division Großdeutschland
			II SS Panzer Corps	General der Waffen-SS Paul Hausser	1st (Leibstandarte Adolf Hitler), 2nd (Das Reich), and the 3rd (Totenkopf) SS Panzergrenadier Divisions
Army Detachment Kempf	Werner Kempf		III Panzer Corps	Hermann Breith	6th, 7th, and 19th Panzer Divisions; 168th Infantry Division
			Corps "Raus"	Erhard Raus	106th and 320th Infantry Divisions
			XLII Army Corps	Franz Mattenklott	39th, 161st, and 282nd Infantry Divisions
Army Group Reserve			XXIV Panzer Corps	Walter Nehring	5th SS (Wiking) Panzergrenadier Division and the 17th Panzer Division
Luftflotte 4			VIII Fliegerkorps		

=== Red Army ===
The Red Army used two Fronts for the defence of Kursk, and created a third front behind the battle area which was held as a reserve. The Central and Voronezh Fronts fielded 12 armies, with 711,575 men (510,983 combat soldiers) and 625,591 men (446,236 combat soldiers) respectively. In reserve, the Steppe Front had an additional 573,195 men (449,133). Thus the total size of the Soviet force was 1,910,361 men, with 1,426,352 actual combat soldiers.

Soviet armour strength included 4,869 tanks and 259 SPGs. Overall a third of the Soviet tanks at Kursk were light tanks, but in some units this proportion was considerably higher. Of the 3,600 tanks in the Central and Voronezh Fronts in July 1943, 1,061 were light as T-60 and T-70 tanks. With very thin armour and small guns, they were unable to effectively engage the frontal armour of German medium and heavy tanks or AFVs.

The most capable Soviet tank at Kursk was the T-34. However, the original version was armed only with a 76.2mm gun, which struggled against uparmoured Panzer IVs, and the frontal armour of Tigers and Panthers was essentially impenetrable. Only the SU-122 and SU-152 self-propelled guns had the power to destroy the Tiger at short range, but they were not equal to the Tiger's 88mm gun at long range, and there were very few SU-122s and SU-152s at Kursk.

Order of battle: Central Front (Army General Konstantin Rokossovsky)
Army	Army Commander	Note	Corps	Divisions
13th Army	Nikolay Pukhov		17th Guards Rifle Corps	6th, 70th, and 75th Guards Rifle Divisions
			18th Guards Rifle Corps	2nd, 3rd, and 4th Airborne Guards Rifle Divisions
			15th Rifle Corps	8th, 74th, and 148th Rifle Divisions
			29th Rifle Corps	15th, 81st, and 307th Rifle Divisions
48th Army	Prokofy Romanenko		42nd Rifle Corps	16th, 202nd, 399th, 73rd, 137th, 143rd, and 170th Rifle Divisions
60th Army	Ivan Chernyakhovsky		24th Rifle Corps	42nd and 112th Rifle Divisions
			30th Rifle Corps	121st, 141st, and 322nd Rifle Divisions
			Independent Divisions	55th Rifle Division
65th Army	Pavel Batov		18th Rifle Corps	69th, 149th, and 246th Rifle Divisions
			27th Rifle Corps	60th, 193rd, 181st, 194th, and 354th Rifle Divisions; 37th Guards Rifle Division
70th Army	Ivan Galanin		28th Rifle Corps	132nd, 211th, 102nd, 106th, 140th, 162nd, and 280th Rifle Divisions
2nd Tank Army	Alexey Rodin		3rd Tank Corps	
			16th Tank Corps	
Front Assets (Independent Units)			9th Tank Corps	
			19th Tank Corps	
16th Air Army	General Sergei Rudenko		3rd Bombing Air Corps	
			6th Fighter Air Corps	
			6th Mixed Air Corps	

Order of battle: Voronezh Front (Army General Nikolai Vatutin)
Army	Army Commander	Note	Corps	Divisions
6th Guards Army	Ivan Chistyakov		22nd Guards Rifle Corps	67th Guards Rifle Division, 71st Rifle Division and the 90th Guards Rifle Division
			23rd Guards Rifle Corps	51st and 52nd Guards Rifle Divisions; 375th Rifle Division
			Independent Divisions	89th Guards Rifle Division
7th Guards Army	Mikhail Shumilov		24th Guards Rifle Corps	15th, 36th, and 72nd Guards Rifle Divisions
			25th Guards Rifle Corps	73rd, 78th, and 81st Guards Rifle Divisions
			Independent Divisions	213th Rifle Division
38th Army	Nikandr Chibisov		50th Rifle Corps	167th, 232nd, and 340th Rifle Divisions
			51st Rifle Corps	180th and 240th Rifle Divisions
			Independent Divisions	204th Rifle Division
40th Army	Kirill Moskalenko		47th Rifle Corps	161st, 206th, and 237th Rifle Divisions
			52nd Rifle Corps	100th, 219th, and 309th Rifle Divisions
			Independent Divisions	184th Rifle Division
69th Army	Vasily Kryuchenkin		48th Rifle Corps	107th, 183rd, and 307th Rifle Divisions
			49th Rifle Corps	111th and 270th Rifle Divisions
1st Guards Tank Army	Mikhail Katukov		6th Tank Corps	
			31st Tank Corps	
			3rd Mechanized Corps	
Front Assets (Independent Units)			35th Guards Rifle Corps	92nd, 93rd, and 94th Guards Rifle Divisions
			2nd Guards Tank Corps	
			3rd Guards Tank Corps	
2nd Air Army	Stepan Krasovsky		1st Bombing Air Corps	
			1st Assault Air Corps	
			4th Fighter Air Corps	
			5th Fighter Air Corps	
Elements of the 17th Air Army				

Order of battle: Steppe Front (Ivan Konev) (Note: This order of battle does not show the complete composition of the Steppe Front. In addition to the units listed below, there are also the 4th Guards, 27th, 47th and 53rd Armies. Perhaps the order of battle below represents only the formations relevant to Operation Citadel.)
Army	Army Commander	Note	Corps	Divisions
5th Guards Army	Alexei Zhadov		32nd Guards Rifle Corps	13th and 66th Guards Rifle Divisions; 6th Airborne Guards Rifle Division
			33rd Guards Rifle Corps	95th and 97th Guards Rifle Divisions; 9th Airborne Guards Rifle Division
			Independent Divisions	42nd Guards Rifle Division and 10th Tank Corps
			Independent 10th Tank Corps	
5th Guards Tank Army	Pavel Rotmistrov		5th Guards Mechanized Corps	
			29th Tank Corps	
5th Air Army	S. Gorunov		7th Mixed Air Corps	
			8th Mixed Air Corps	
			3rd Fighter Air Corps	
			7th Fighter Air Corps	

=== Comparison of strength ===
Operation Citadel
	Men			Tanks			Guns		
	Soviet	Ratio	German	Soviet	Ratio	German	Soviet	Ratio	German
Frieser (Note: Frieser uses combat strengths.)	1,426,352	2.8:1	518,271	4,938 (Note: Frieser counts only operational tanks.)	2:1	2,465	31,415	4:1	7,417
Glantz (Note: Glantz uses total strengths.)	1,910,361	2.5:1	780,900	5,128	1.7:1	2,928			

Red Army offensive phase
	Men			Tanks			Guns		
	Soviet	Ratio	German	Soviet	Ratio	German	Soviet	Ratio	German
Frieser	1,987,463	3.2:1	625,271	8,200	3:1	2,699	47,416	5:1	9,467
Glantz (Note: Glantz uses total strengths.)	2,500,000	2.7:1	940,900	7,360 (Note: Glantz does not count reinforcements.)	2.3:1	3,253			

=== Preliminary actions ===
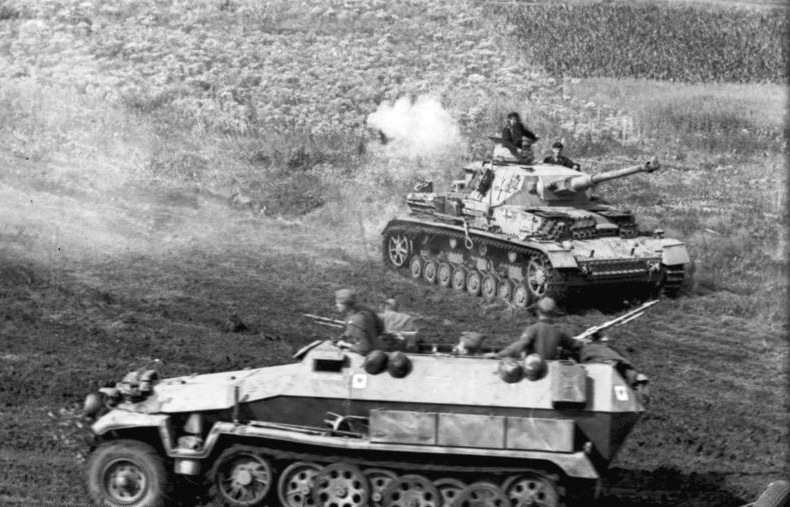
German Panzer IV and Sd.Kfz. 251 halftrack. June 1943

Fighting started on the southern face of the salient on the evening of 4 July 1943, when German infantry launched attacks to seize high ground for artillery observation posts prior to the main assault. During these attacks, a number of Red Army command and observation posts along the first main belt of defence were captured. By 16:00, elements of the Panzergrenadier Division "Großdeutschland", 3rd and 11th Panzer Divisions had seized the village of Butovo and proceeded to capture Gertsovka before midnight. At around 22:30, Vatutin ordered 600 guns, mortars and Katyusha rocket launchers, of the Voronezh Front, to bombard the forward German positions, particularly those of the II SS Panzer Corps.

To the north, at Central Front headquarters, reports of the anticipated German offensive came in. At around 02:00, 5 July, Zhukov ordered his preemptive artillery bombardment to begin. The hope was to disrupt German forces concentrating for the attack, but the outcome was less than hoped for. The bombardment delayed the German formations but failed in the goal of disrupting their schedule or inflicting substantial losses. The Germans began their own artillery bombardment at about 05:00, which lasted 80 minutes in the northern face and 50 minutes in the southern face. After the barrage, the ground forces attacked, aided by close air support provided by the Luftwaffe.

In the early morning of 5 July, the VVS launched a large raid against German airfields, hoping to destroy the Luftwaffe on the ground. This effort failed, and the VVS units suffered considerable losses. The air operation is misunderstood in most accounts. The German Freya radar stations at Belgorod and Kharkov in 1943 had only picked up Soviet air formations approaching Belgorod and were not responsible for the failure of the entire Soviet preemptive air strike on the eve of Operation Citadel. The VVS lost 176 aircraft on 5 July, compared to the 26 aircraft lost by the Luftwaffe. The losses of the VVS 16th Air Army operating in the northern face were lighter than those suffered by the 2nd Air Army. The Luftwaffe was able to gain and maintain air superiority over the southern face until 10–11 July, when the VVS began to obtain ascendancy, but the control of the skies over the northern face was evenly contested until the VVS began to gain air superiority on 7 July, which it maintained for the rest of the operation.

== Operation along the northern face ==
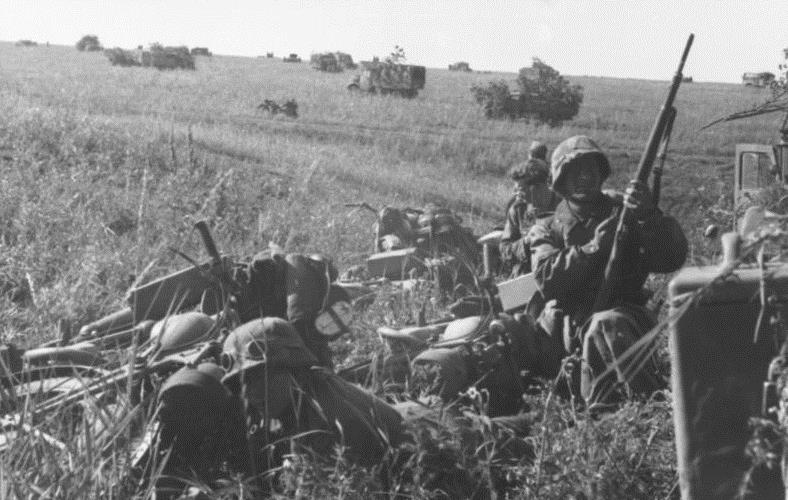
German motorised troops with their motorcycles prepare to move out.

Model's main attack was delivered by XLVII Panzer Corps, supported by 45 Tigers of the attached 505th Heavy Tank Battalion. Covering their left flank was XLI Panzer Corps, with an attached regiment of 83 Ferdinand tank destroyers. On the right flank, XLVI Panzer Corps consisted at this time of four infantry divisions with just nine tanks and 31 assault guns. To the left of XLI Panzer Corps was XXIII Army Corps, which consisted of the reinforced 78th Assault Infantry Division and two regular infantry divisions. While the corps contained no tanks, it did have 62 assault guns. Opposing the 9th Army was the Central Front, deployed in three heavily fortified defensive belts.

=== Initial German advance ===
Model chose to make his initial attacks using infantry divisions reinforced with assault guns and heavy tanks, and supported by artillery and the Luftwaffe. In doing so he sought to maintain the armoured strength of his panzer divisions to be used for exploitation once the Red Army defences were breached. Once a breakthrough had been achieved the panzer forces would move through and advance towards Kursk. Jan Möschen, a major in Model's staff, later commented that Model expected a breakthrough on the second day. If a breakthrough did occur the briefest delay in bringing up the panzer divisions would give the Red Army time to react. His corps commanders thought that a breakthrough was extremely unlikely.

Following a preliminary bombardment and Red Army counter bombardments, the 9th Army opened its attack at 05:30 on 5 July. Nine infantry divisions and one panzer division, with attached assault guns, heavy tanks and tank destroyers, pushed forward. Two companies of Tiger tanks were attached to the 6th Infantry Division and were the largest single grouping of Tigers employed that day. Opposing them were the 13th and 70th Armies of the Central Front.

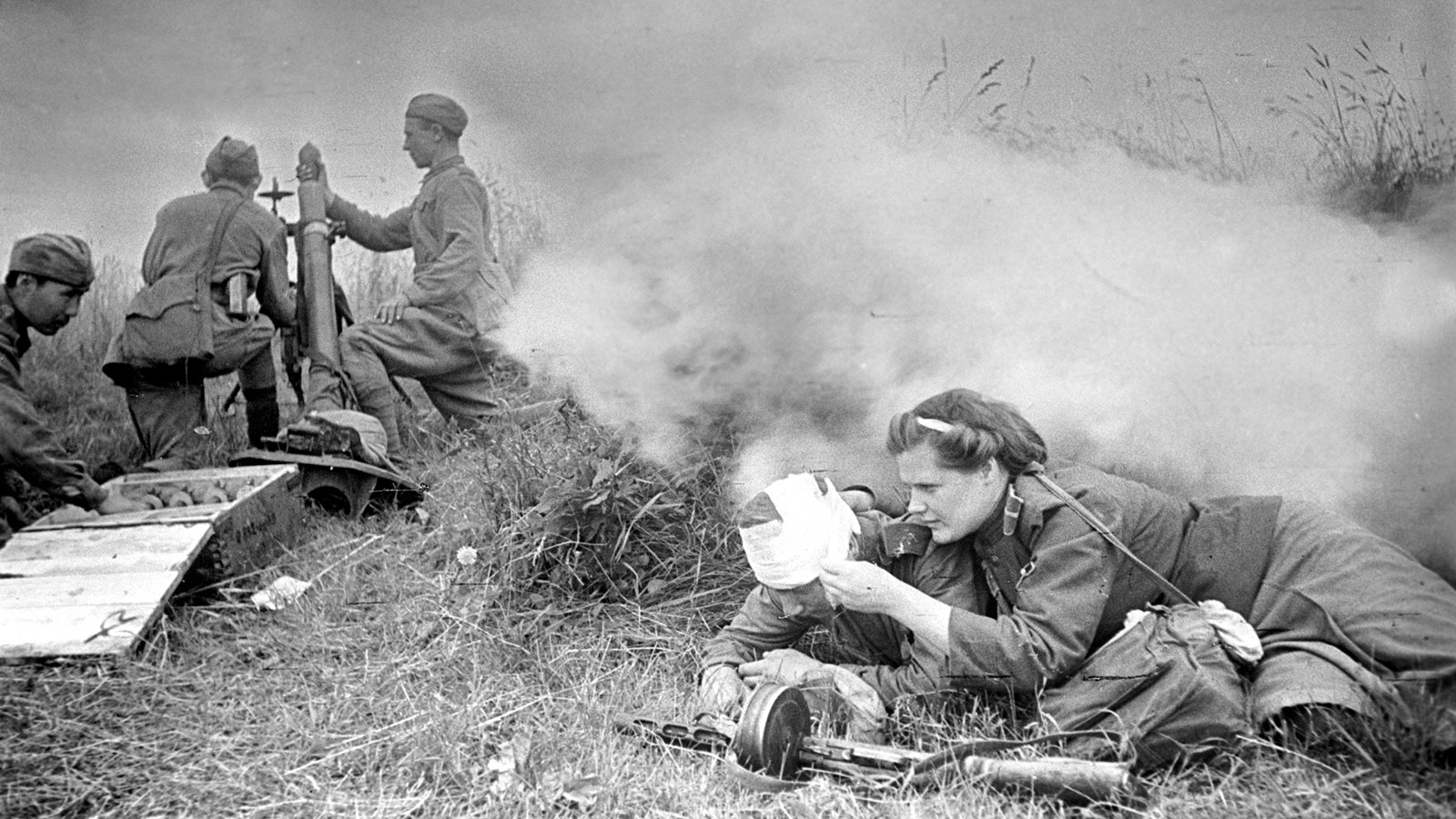
Starshina Anna Sokolova, sanitary instructor of an anti-tank battery of the 15th Rifle Division, bandages a wounded soldier as an 82 mm mortar fires in the background

The 20th Panzer and 6th Infantry Divisions of the XLVII Panzer Corps spearheaded the advance. Behind them the remaining two panzer divisions followed, ready to exploit any breakthrough. The heavily mined terrain and fortified positions of the 15th Rifle Division slowed the advance. By 08:00 safe lanes had been cleared through the minefield. That morning information obtained from prisoner interrogation identified a weakness at the boundary of the 15th and 81st Rifle Divisions caused by the German preliminary bombardment. The Tigers were redeployed and struck towards this area. Red Army formations countered with a force of around 90 T-34s. In the resulting three-hour battle, Red Army armoured units lost 42 tanks while the Germans lost two Tigers and a further five more immobilized with track damage. While the Red Army counter-attack was defeated and the first defensive belt breached, the fighting had delayed the Germans long enough for the rest of 29th Rifle Corps of the 13th Army – initially deployed behind the first belt – to move forward and seal the breach. Red Army minefields were covered by artillery fire, making efforts to clear paths through the fields difficult and costly. Goliath and Borgward IV remote-controlled engineer mine-clearing vehicles met with limited success. Of the 653rd Heavy Panzerjäger Battalion's 45 Ferdinands sent into battle, all but 12 of them were immobilized by mine damage before 17:00. Most of these were later repaired and returned to service, but the recovery of these very large vehicles was difficult.

On the first day, the XLVII Panzer Corps penetrated 6 mi (9.7 km) into the Red Army defences before stalling, and the XLI Panzer Corps reached the heavily fortified small town of Ponyri, in the second defensive belt, which controlled the roads and railways leading south to Kursk. The German advance 5 to 6 mi (8.0 to 9.7 km) into the Red Army lines cost 1,287 men killed and missing and a further 5,921 wounded.

=== Red Army counter-attack ===
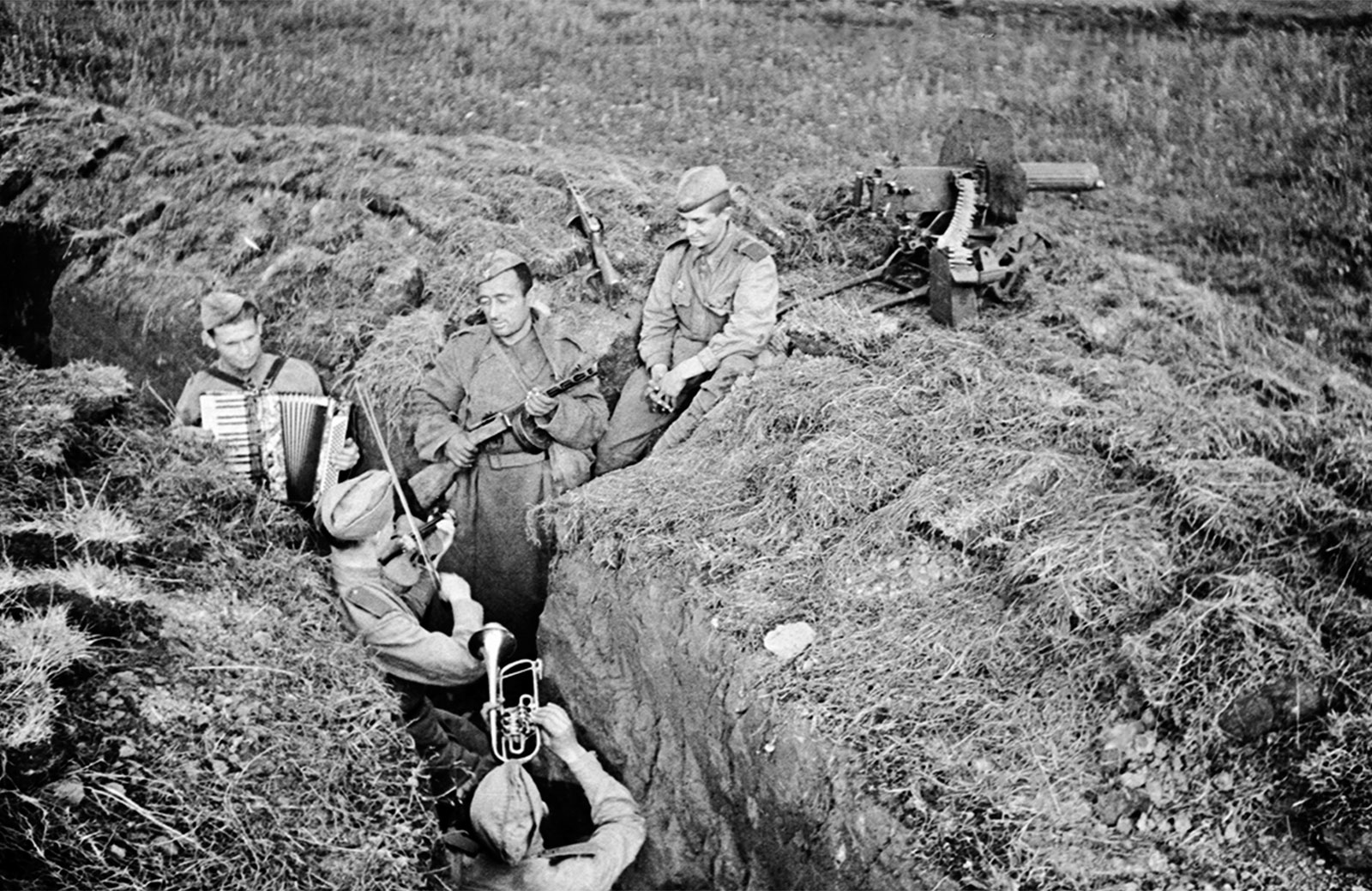
A concert brigade performs for troops of the 13th Army's 8th Rifle Division during a lull in the fighting, 7 July 1943

Rokossovsky ordered the 17th Guards and 18th Guards Rifle Corps with the 2nd Tank Army and 19th Tank Corps, backed up by close air support, to counterattack the German 9th Army the following day on 6 July. However, due to poor coordination, only the 16th Tank Corps of the 2nd Tank Army commenced the counterattack on the dawn of 6 July after the preparatory artillery barrage. The 16th Tank Corps, fielding about 200 tanks, attacked the XLVII Panzer Corps and ran into the Tiger tanks of the 505th Heavy Tank Battalion, which knocked out 69 tanks and forced the rest to withdraw to the 17th Guards Rifle Corps of the 13th Army. Later that morning, the XLVII Panzer Corps responded with its own attack against the 17th Guards Rifle Corps entrenched around the village Olkhovatka in the second defensive belt. The attack commenced with an artillery barrage and was spearheaded by the 24 serviceable Tigers of the 505th Heavy Tank Battalion, but it failed to break the Red Army defence at Olkhovatka, and the Germans suffered heavy casualties. Olkhovatka was on high ground that provided a clear view of much of the frontline. At 18:30, the 19th Tank Corps joined the 17th Guards Rifle Corps further bolstering resistance. Rokossovsky also decided to dig in most of his remaining tanks to minimize their exposure. Ponyri, defended by the 307th Rifle Division of the 29th Rifle Corps, was also concertedly attacked on 6 July by the German 292nd and 86th Infantry, 78th Assault Infantry and 9th Panzer Divisions, but the Germans were unable to dislodge the defenders from the heavily fortified village.

=== Ponyri and Olkhovatka ===
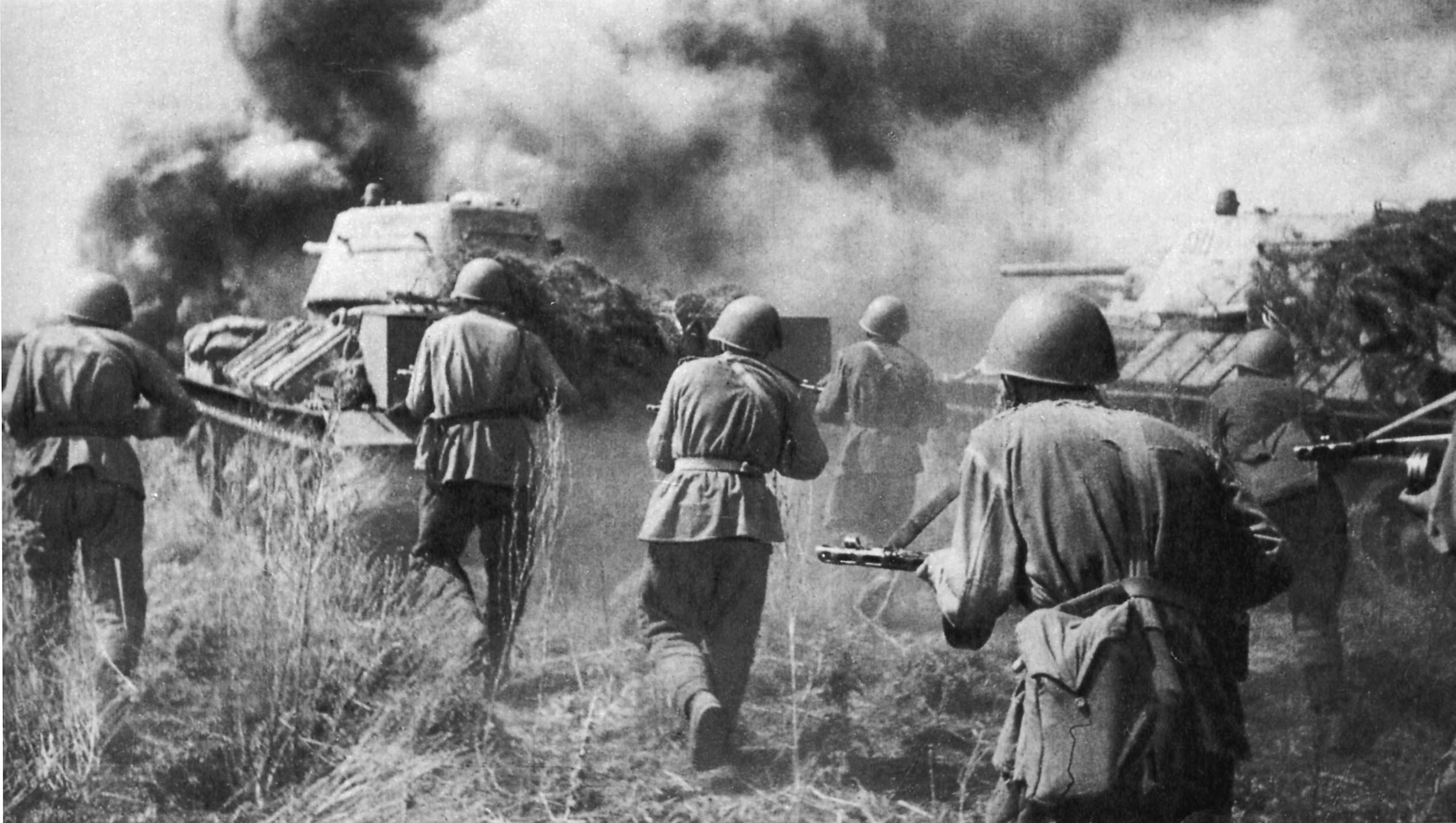
Soviet troops of the Voronezh Front counterattacking behind T-34 tanks at Prokhorovka, 12 July 1943

Over the next three days from 7 to 10 July, Model concentrated the effort of the 9th Army at Ponyri and Olkhovatka, which both sides considered as vital positions. In response, Rokossovsky pulled forces from other parts of the front to these sectors. The Germans attacked Ponyri on 7 July, and captured half of the town after intense house-to-house fighting. A Soviet counterattack the following morning forced the Germans to withdraw, and a series of counterattacks ensued by both sides with control of the town being exchanged several times over the next few days. By 10 July, the Germans had secured most of the town, but Soviet counterattacks continued. The back and forth battles for Ponyri and the nearby Hill 253.5 were battles of attrition, with heavy casualties on both sides. The intensity led it to being referred to by the troops as "mini-Stalingrad" and by military historian Paul Carell as the "Stalingrad of the Kursk salient". The war diary of the 9th Army described the heavy fighting as a "new type of mobile attrition battle". German attacks on Olkhovatka and the nearby village of Teploe failed to penetrate the Soviet defences; including a powerful concerted attack on 10 July by about 300 German tanks and assault guns from the 2nd, 4th, and 20th Panzer Divisions, supported by every available Luftwaffe air power in the northern face.

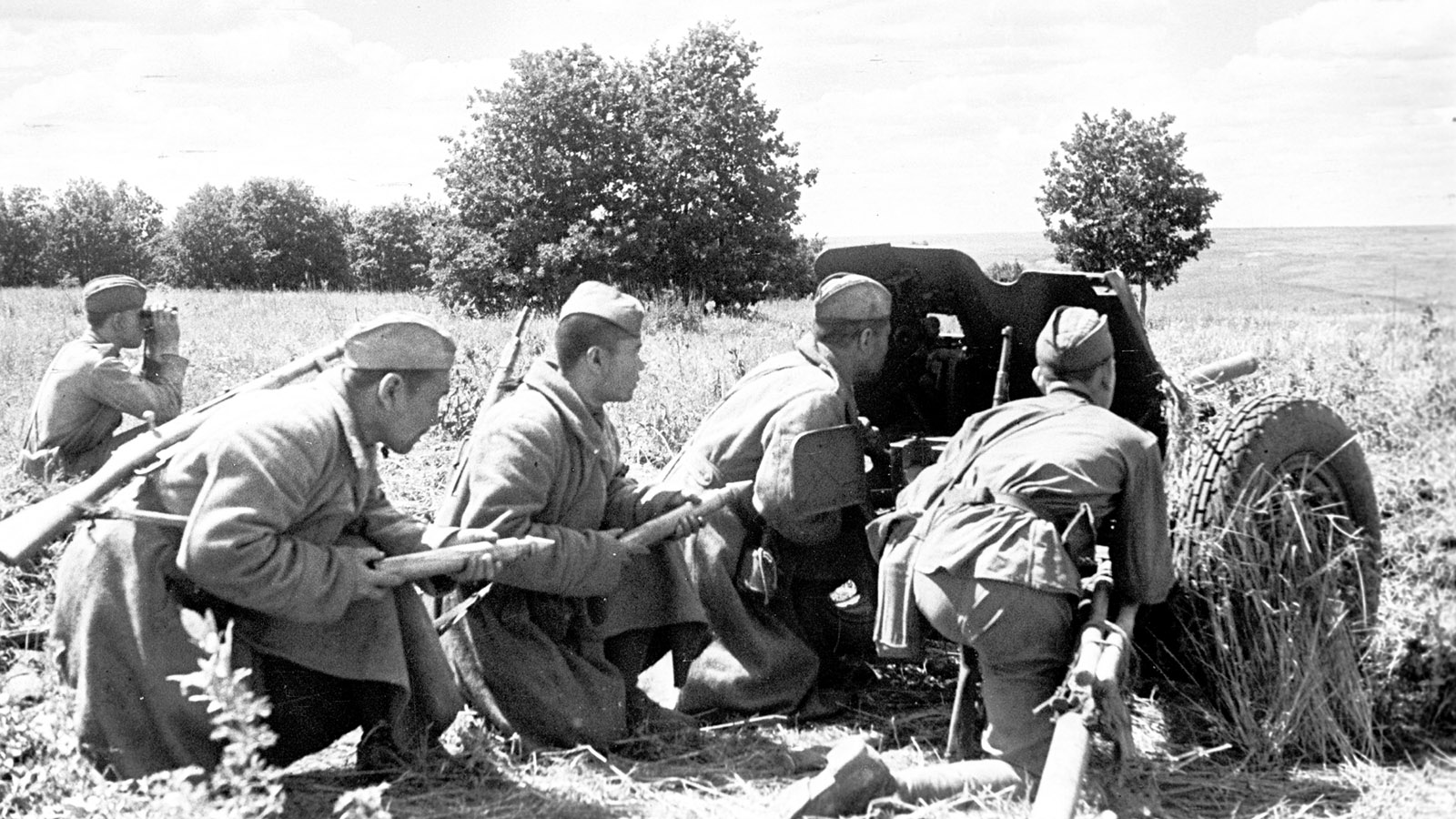
A Soviet 45 mm 53-K anti-tank gun crew in position near Ponyri, July 1943

On 9 July, a meeting between Kluge, Model, Joachim Lemelsen and Josef Harpe was held at the headquarters of the XLVII Panzer Corps. It had become clear to the German commanders that the 9th Army lacked the strength to obtain a breakthrough, and their Soviet counterparts had also realized this, but Kluge wished to maintain the pressure on the Soviets in order to aid the southern offensive.

While the operation on the northern side of the salient began with a 45 km-wide (28 mi) attack front, by 6 July, it had been reduced to 40 km-wide (25 mi). The following day the attack frontage dropped to 15 km-wide (9.3 mi), and on both the 8 and 9 July penetrations of only 2 km-wide (1.2 mi) occurred. By 10 July, the Soviets had completely halted the German advance.

On 12 July, the Soviets launched Operation Kutuzov, their counter-offensive upon the Orel salient, which threatened the flank and rear of Model's 9th Army. The 12th Panzer Division, thus far held in reserve and slated to be committed to the northern side of the Kursk salient, along with the 36th Motorized Infantry, 18th Panzer and 20th Panzer Divisions were redeployed to face the Soviet spearheads.

== Operation along the southern face ==
At around 04:00 on 5 July, the German attack commenced with a preliminary bombardment. Manstein's main attack was delivered by Hoth's 4th Panzer Army, which was organized into densely concentrated spearheads, and which included some of the finest divisions in the German Army, with the forces under Hoth's command regarded as "the most powerful striking force ever assembled under a single German commander". In fifty minutes, Hoth's bombardment expended more shells than the combined total fired by German forces during the Polish Campaign and French Campaign. The 4th Panzer Army was opposed by the Soviet 6th Guards Army, which was composed of the 22nd Guards Rifle Corps and 23rd Guards Rifle Corps. The Soviets had constructed three fortified defensive belts to slow and weaken the attacking armoured forces. Though they had been provided superb intelligence, the Voronezh Front headquarters had still not been able to pinpoint the location where the Germans would place their offensive weight.

=== Initial German advance ===
==== XLVIII Panzer Corps ====
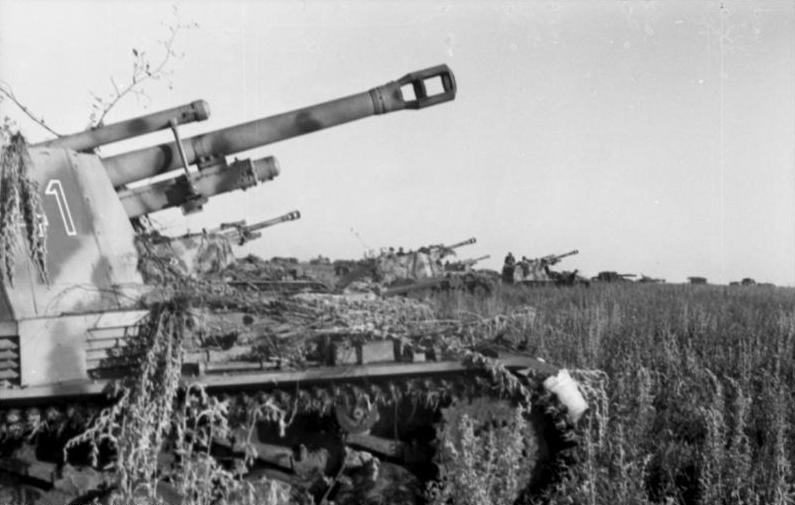
Wespe self-propelled artillery battery in position to provide fire support

The panzergrenadier division Großdeutschland (Walter Hörnlein), was the strongest division in the 4th Panzer Army. It was supported on its flanks by the 3rd and 11th Panzer Divisions. The Panzer IIIs and IVs of the Großdeutschland had been supplemented by a company of 15 Tiger tanks, which were used to spearhead the attack. At dawn on 5 July, Großdeutschland, backed by heavy artillery support, advanced on a three-kilometre front upon the 67th Guards Rifle Division of the 22nd Guards Rifle Corps. The Panzerfüsilier Regiment, advancing on the left wing, stalled in a minefield and subsequently 36 Panthers were immobilized. The stranded regiment was subjected to a barrage of Soviet anti-tank and artillery fire, which inflicted numerous casualties. Engineers were moved up and cleared paths through the minefield but suffered casualties in the process. The combination of fierce resistance, minefields, thick mud and mechanical breakdowns took its toll. With paths cleared, the regiment resumed its advance towards Gertsovka. In the ensuing battle, many casualties were suffered, including the regimental commander Colonel Kassnitz. Due to the fighting, and the marshy terrain south of the village, surrounding the Berezovyy stream, the regiment once more bogged down.

The panzergrenadier regiment of Großdeutschland, advancing on the right wing, pushed through to the village of Butovo. The tanks were deployed in a Panzerkeil (arrow) formation to minimise the effects of the Soviet Pakfront defence, with the Tigers leading and the Panzer IIIs, IVs and assault guns fanning out to the flanks and rear. They were followed by infantry and combat engineers. Attempts by the VVS to impede the advance were repulsed by the Luftwaffe.

The 3rd Panzer Division, advancing on the left flank of Großdeutschland, made good progress and by the end of the day had captured Gertsovka and reached Mikhailovka. The 167th Infantry Division, on the right flank of the 11th Panzer Division, also made sufficient progress, reaching Tirechnoe by the end of the day. By the end of 5 July, a wedge had been created in the first belt of the Soviet defences.

==== II SS Panzer Corps ====
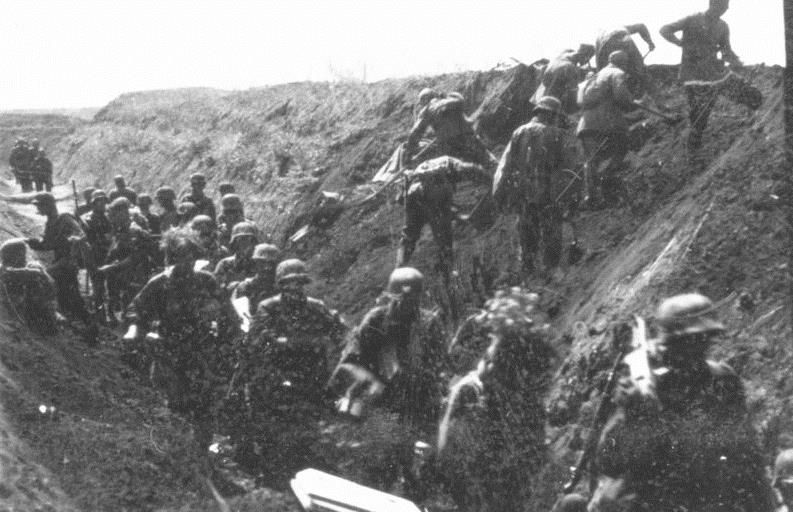
German soldiers move along an anti-tank ditch, while combat engineers prepare charges to breach it.

To the east, during the night of 4–5 July, SS combat engineers had infiltrated no-man's land and cleared lanes through the Soviet minefields. At dawn, 5 July, the three divisions of II SS Panzer Corps – SS Panzergrenadier Division Leibstandarte Adolf Hitler, 2nd SS Panzergrenadier Division Das Reich and the 3rd SS Panzergrenadier Division Totenkopf – attacked the 52nd Guards Rifle Division of the 6th Guards Army. The main assault was led by a spearhead of 42 Tigers among 494 tanks and assault guns attacking on a twelve-kilometre front. Totenkopf, the strongest of the three divisions, advanced towards Gremuchhi and screened the right flank. The 1st SS Panzergrenadier Division advanced on the left flank towards Bykovka. The 2nd SS Panzer Division advanced between the two formations in the center. Following closely behind the tanks were the infantry and combat engineers, coming forward to demolish obstacles and clear trenches. The advance was well supported by the Luftwaffe, which greatly aided in breaking Soviet strong points and artillery positions.

By 09:00, the II SS Panzer Corps had broken through the Soviet first belt of defence along its entire front. While probing positions between the first and second Soviet defensive belts, at 13:00, the 2nd SS Panzer Division vanguard came under fire from two T-34 tanks, which were destroyed. Forty more Soviet tanks soon engaged the division. The 1st Guards Tank Army clashed with the 2nd SS Panzer Division in a four-hour battle, resulting in the Soviet tanks withdrawing. The engagement bought enough time for units of the 23rd Soviet Guards Rifle Corps, lodged in the Soviet second belt, to prepare itself and be reinforced with additional anti-tank guns. By the early evening, 2nd SS Panzer Division had reached the minefields on the perimeter of the Soviet second belt of defence. The 1st SS Division had secured Bykovka by 16:10, then pushed forward towards the second belt of defence at Yakovlevo but its attempts to break through were rebuffed. By the end of the day, the 1st SS Division had sustained 97 dead, 522 wounded and 17 missing and lost about 30 tanks. Together with the 2nd SS Panzer Division, it had forced a wedge far into the defences of the 6th Guards Army.

The 3rd SS Panzer Division was making slow progress. They had managed to isolate the 155th Guards Regiment, 52nd Guards Rifle Division (of the 23rd Guards Rifle Corps), from the rest of the division but its attempts to sweep the regiment eastward into the flank of the neighbouring 375th Rifle Division (of the 23rd Guards Rifle Corps) had failed when the regiment was reinforced by the 96th Tank Brigade. Hausser, the commander of II SS Panzer Corps, requested aid from the III Panzer Corps to his right but it had no units to spare. By the end of the day, the 3rd SS Division had made very limited progress due in part to a tributary of the Donets river. The lack of progress undermined the advance made by its sister divisions and exposed the right flank of the corps to Soviet forces. The temperatures, reaching over 30 degrees Celsius, and frequent thunderstorms made fighting conditions difficult.

The 6th Guards Army, which confronted the attack by the XLVIII Panzer Korps and II SS Panzer Korps, was reinforced with tanks from the 1st Tank Army, the 2nd Guards Tank Corps and the 5th Guards Tank Corps. The 51st and 90th Guards Rifle divisions were moved up to the vicinity of Pokrovka (not Prokhorovka, 40 kilometres (25 mi) to the north-east), in the path of the 1st SS Panzer Division. The 93rd Guards Rifle Division was deployed further back, along the road leading from Pokrovka to Prokhorovka.

==== Army Detachment Kempf ====
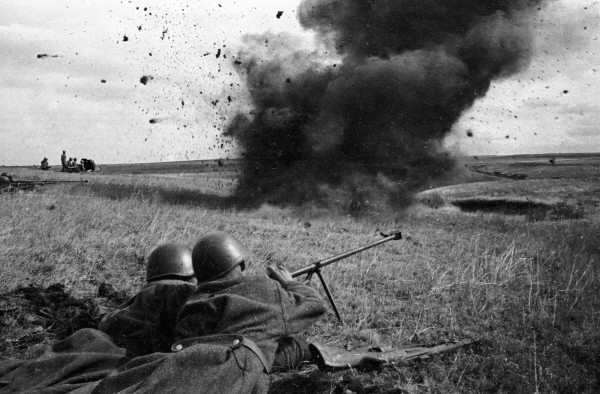
Soviet PTRD anti-tank rifle team during the fighting

Facing Army Detachment Kempf, consisting of III Panzer Corps and Corps Raus (commanded by Erhard Raus), was the 7th Guards Army, dug in on the high ground on the eastern bank of the Northern Donets. The two German corps were tasked with crossing the river, breaking through the 7th Guards Army and covering the right flank of the 4th Panzer Army. The 503rd Heavy Tank Battalion, equipped with 45 Tigers, was also attached to the III Panzer Corps, with one company of 15 Tigers attached to each of the corps' three panzer divisions.

At the Mikhailovka bridgehead, just south of Belgorod, eight infantry battalions of the 6th Panzer Division crossed the river under heavy Soviet bombardment. Part of a company of Tigers from the 503rd Heavy Tank Battalion was able to cross before the bridge was destroyed. The rest of the 6th Panzer Division was unable to cross further south due to a traffic jam at the crossing, and remained on the western bank of the river throughout the day. Those units of the division that had crossed the river attacked Stary Gorod, but were unable to break through due to poorly cleared minefields and strong resistance.

To the south of the 6th Panzer Division, the 19th Panzer Division crossed the river but was delayed by mines, moving forward 8 kilometres (5.0 mi) by the end of the day. Luftwaffe bombed the bridgehead in a friendly fire incident, wounding 6th Panzer Division commander Walther von Hünersdorff and Hermann von Oppeln-Bronikowski of the 19th Panzer Division. Further south, infantry and tanks of 7th Panzer Division crossed the river. A new bridge had to be built specifically for the Tigers, causing further delays. Despite a poor start, the 7th Panzer Division eventually broke into the first belt of the Soviet defence and pushed on between Razumnoe and Krutoi Log, advancing 10 kilometres (6.2 mi), the furthest Kempf got during the day.

Operating to the south of 7th Panzer Division, were the 106th Infantry Division and the 320th Infantry Division of Corps Raus. The two formations attacked across a 32 kilometres (20 mi) front without armour support. The advance began well, with the crossing of the river and a swift advance against the 72nd Guards Rifle Division. Corps Raus took the village of Maslovo Pristani, penetrating the first Red Army defence line. A Soviet counter-attack supported by about 40 tanks was beaten off, with the assistance from artillery and flak batteries. After having suffered 2,000 casualties since the morning and still facing considerable resistance from the Soviet forces, the corps dug in for the night.

Delaying the progress of Kempf allowed Red Army forces time to prepare their second belt of defence to meet the German attack on 6 July. The 7th Guards Army, which had absorbed the attack of III Panzer Corps and Corps "Raus", was reinforced with two rifle divisions from the reserve. The 15th Guards Rifle Division was moved up to the second belt of defence, in the path of the III Panzer Corps.

=== Development of the battle ===
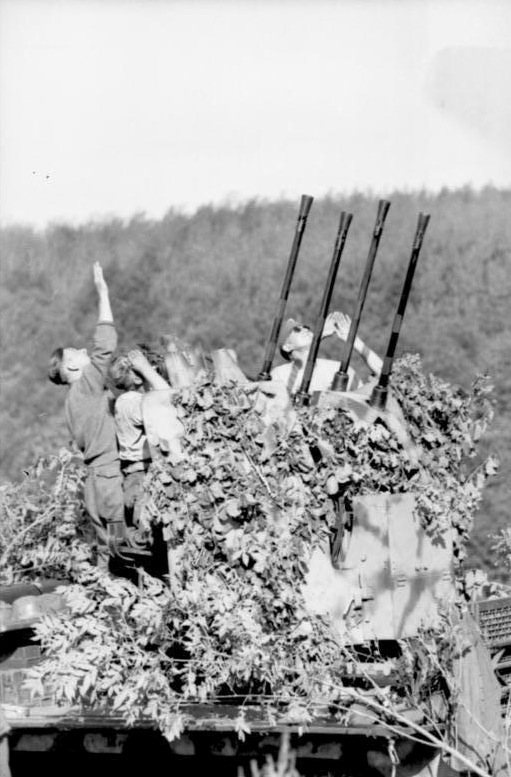
Luftwaffe Flakvierling unit

By the evening of 6 July, the Voronezh Front had committed all of its reserves, except for three rifle divisions under the 69th Army; yet it could not decisively contain the 4th Panzer Army. The XLVIII Panzer Corps along the Oboyan axis, where the third defensive belt was mostly unoccupied, now had only the Red Army second defensive belt blocking it from breakthrough into the unfortified Soviet rear. This forced the Stavka to commit their strategic reserves to reinforce the Voronezh Front: the 5th Guards and 5th Guards Tank Armies, both from the Steppe Front, as well as the 2nd Tank Corps from the Southwestern Front. Ivan Konev objected to this premature piecemeal commitment of the strategic reserve, but a personal call from Stalin silenced his complaints. In addition, on 7 July Zhukov ordered the 17th Air Army – the air fleet serving the Southwestern Front – to support the 2nd Air Army in serving the Voronezh Front. On 7 July, the 5th Guards Tank Army began advancing to Prokhorovka. 5th Guards Tank Army commander, Lieutenant General Pavel Rotmistrov, described the journey:

By midday, the dust rose in thick clouds, settling in a solid layer on roadside bushes, grain fields, tanks and trucks. The dark red disc of the sun was hardly visible. Tanks, self-propelled guns, artillery tractors, armoured personnel carriers and trucks were advancing in an unending flow. The faces of the soldiers were dark with dust and exhaust fumes. It was intolerably hot. Soldiers were tortured by thirst and their shirts, wet with sweat, stuck to their bodies.

The 10th Tank Corps, then still subordinate to the 5th Guards Army, was rushed ahead of the rest of the army, arriving at Prokhorovka on the night of 7 July, and 2nd Tank Corps arrived at Korocha, 40 km (25 mi) southeast of Prokhorovka, by morning of 8 July. Vatutin ordered a powerful counterattack by the 5th Guards, 2nd Guards, 2nd and 10th Tank Corps, in all fielding about 593 tanks and self-propelled guns and supported by most of the Front's available air power, which aimed to defeat the II SS Panzer Corps and therefore expose the right flank of XLVIII Panzer Corps. Simultaneously, the 6th Tank Corps was to attack the XLVIII Panzer Corps and prevent it from breaking through to the free Soviet rear. Although intended to be concerted, the counterattack turned out to be a series of piecemeal attacks due to poor coordination. The 10th Tank Corps' attack began on the dawn of 8 July but they ran straight into the antitank fire of the 2nd and 3rd SS Divisions, losing most of its forces. Later that morning, the 5th Guards Tank Corps' attack was repelled by the 3rd SS Division. The 2nd Tank Corps joined in the afternoon and was also repelled. The 2nd Guards Tank Corps, masked by the forest around the village Gostishchevo, 16 km (10 mi) north of Belgorod, with its presence unknown to the II SS Panzer Corps, advanced towards the 167th Infantry Division. But it was detected by German air reconnaissance just before the attack had materialized, and was subsequently decimated by German ground-attack aircraft armed with MK 103 anti-tank cannons and at least 50 tanks were destroyed. This marked the first time in military history an attacking tank formation had been defeated by air power alone. Although a fiasco, the Soviet counterattack succeeded in stalling the advance of the II SS Panzer Corps throughout the day.

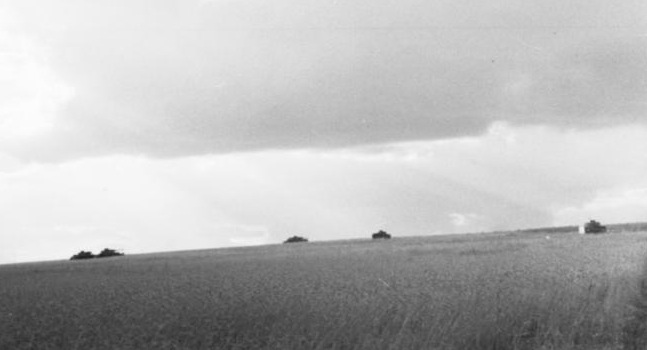
Thunderclouds over the battleground. Intermittent heavy rains created mud and marsh that made movement difficult.

By the end of 8 July, II SS-Panzer Corps had advanced about 29 kilometres (18 mi) since the start of Citadel and broken through the first and second defensive belts. However, slow progress by the XLVIII Panzer Corps caused Hoth to shift elements of the II SS-Panzer Corps to the west to help the XLVIII Panzer Corps regain its momentum. On 10 July the full effort of the corps was shifted back to its own forward progress. The direction of their advance now shifted from Oboyan due north to the northeast, toward Prokhorovka. Hoth had discussed this move with Manstein since early May, and it was a part of the 4th Panzer Army's plan since the outset of the offensive. By this time, however, the Soviets had shifted reserve formations into its path. The defensive positions were manned by the 2nd Tank Corps, reinforced by the 9th Guards Airborne Division and 301st Anti-tank Artillery Regiment, both from the 33rd Guards Rifle Corps.

Though the German advance in the south was slower than planned, it was faster than the Soviets expected. On 9 July, the first German units reached the Psel River. The next day, the first German infantry crossed the river. Despite the deep defensive system and minefields, German tank losses remained lower than the Soviets'. At this point, Hoth turned the II SS Panzer Corps away from Oboyan to attack toward the northeast in the direction of Prokhorovka. The main concern of Manstein and Hausser was the inability of Army Detachment Kempf to advance and protect the eastern flank of the II SS Panzer Corps. On 11 July, Army Detachment Kempf finally achieved a breakthrough. In a surprise night attack, the 6th Panzer Division seized a bridge across the Donets. Once across, Breith made every effort to push troops and vehicles across the river for an advance on Prokhorovka from the south. A linkup with the II SS Panzer Corps would result with the Soviet 69th Army becoming encircled.

=== Battle of Prokhorovka ===
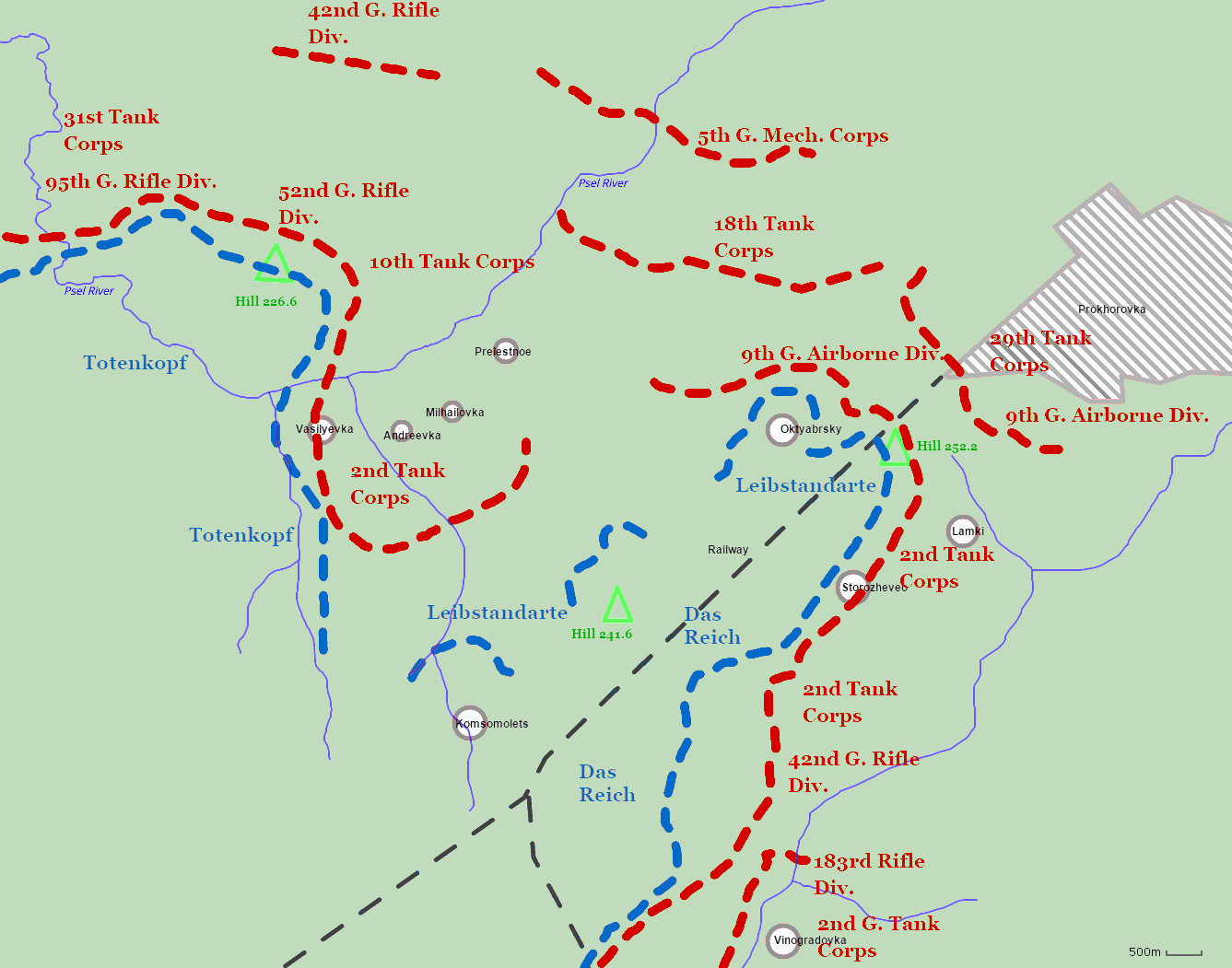
Disposition of Soviet and German forces around Prokhorovka on the eve of the battle on 12 July.

Throughout 10 and 11 July, the II-SS Panzer Corps continued its attack toward Prokhorovka, reaching within 3 kilometres (1.9 mi) of the settlement by the night of 11 July. That same night, Hausser issued orders for the attack to continue the next day. The plan was for the 3rd SS Panzer Division to drive northeast until it reached the Karteschewka-Prokhorovka road. Once there, they were to strike southeast to attack the Soviet positions at Prokhorovka from the flanks and rear. The 1st and 2nd SS Panzer divisions were to wait until 3rd SS Panzer Division attack had destabilised the Soviet positions at Prokhorovka; and once underway, the 1st SS Panzer Division was to attack the main Soviet defences dug in on the slopes southwest of Prokhorovka. To the division's right, the 2nd SS Panzer Division was to advance eastward, then turn southward away from Prokhorovka to roll up the Soviet lines opposing the III Panzer Corps' advance and force a gap. During the night of 11 July, Rotmistrov moved his 5th Guards Tank Army to an assembly area just behind Prokhorovka in preparation for a massive attack the following day. At 5:45 Leibstandarte headquarters started receiving reports of the sound of tank engines as the Soviets moved into their assembly areas. Soviet artillery and Katyusha regiments were redeployed in preparation for the counterattack.

At around 08:00, a Soviet artillery barrage began. At 08:30, Rotmistrov radioed his tankers: "Steel, Steel, Steel!", the order to commence the attack. Down off the west slopes, before Prokhorovka, came the massed armour of five tank brigades from the Soviet 18th and 29th Tank Corps of the 5th Guards Tank Army. The Soviet tanks advanced down the corridor, carrying mounted infantrymen of the 9th Guards Airborne Division on the tanks. To the north and east, the 3rd SS Panzer Division was engaged by the Soviet 33rd Guards Rifle Corps. Tasked with flanking the Soviet defences around Prokhorovka, the unit first had to beat off a number of attacks before they could go over onto the offensive. Most of the division's tank losses occurred late in the afternoon as they advanced through mine fields against well-hidden Soviet anti-tank guns. Although the 3rd SS succeeded in reaching the Karteschewka-Prokhorovka road, their hold was tenuous and it cost the division half of its armour. The majority of German tank losses suffered at Prokhorovka occurred here. To the south, the Soviet 18th and 29th Tank Corps had been thrown back by the 1st SS Panzer Division. The 2nd SS Panzer Division also repelled attacks from the 2nd Tank Corps and the 2nd Guards Tank Corps. Luftwaffe local air superiority over the battlefield also contributed to the Soviet losses, partly due to the VVS being directed against the German units on the flanks of II SS Panzer Corps. By the end of the day, the Soviets had fallen back to their starting positions.

Neither the 5th Guards Tank Army nor the II SS Panzer Corps accomplished their objectives. Although the Soviet counterattack failed with heavy losses, throwing them back onto the defensive, they did enough to stop a German breakthrough.

== Termination of Operation Citadel ==
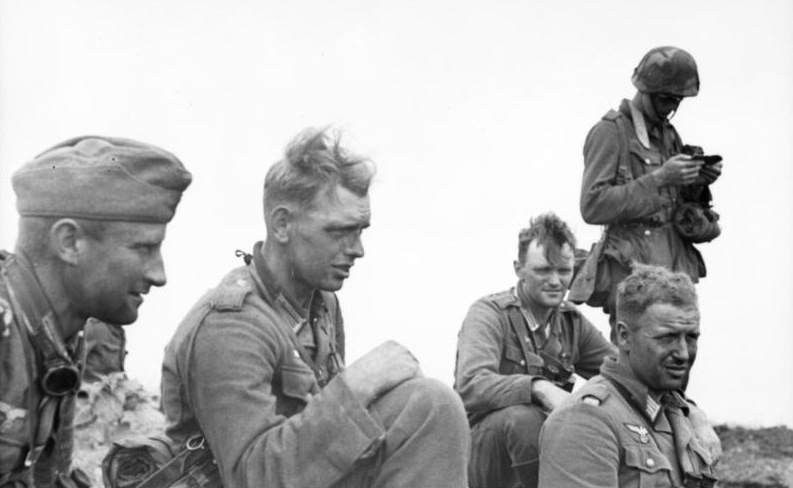
German soldiers pause during the fighting.

On the evening of 12 July, Hitler summoned Kluge and Manstein to his headquarters at Görlitz in East Prussia (now Gierłoż, Poland). Two days earlier, the Western Allies had invaded Sicily. The threat of further Allied landings in Italy or along southern France made Hitler believe it was essential to stop the offensive and move forces from Kursk to Italy. Kluge welcomed the news, as he was aware that the Soviets were initiating a massive counter-offensive against his sector but Manstein was less welcoming. Manstein's forces had just spent a week fighting through a maze of defensive works and he believed they were on the verge of breaking through to more open terrain, which would allow him to engage and destroy the Soviet armoured reserves in a mobile battle. Manstein stated, "On no account should we let go of the enemy until the mobile reserves he [has] committed [are] completely beaten". Hitler agreed temporarily to allow the continuation of the offensive in the southern part of the salient, but the following day he ordered Manstein's reserve – the XXIV Panzer Corps – to move south to support the 1st Panzer Army.

The offensive continued in the southern part with the launch of Operation Roland on 14 July. After three days, on 17 July, the II SS Panzer Corps was ordered to end its offensive operations and begin to withdraw, marking the end of Operation Roland. One division was transferred to Italy and the other two were sent south to meet new Soviet offensives. The strength of the Soviet reserve formations had been greatly underestimated by German intelligence and the Red Army soon went onto the offensive. In his post-war memoirs Verlorene Siege (Lost Victories), Manstein was highly critical of Hitler's decision to call off the operation at the height of the tactical battle; however, the veracity of Manstein's claims of a near victory is debatable as the quantity of Soviet reserves was far greater than he realized. These reserves were used to re-equip the mauled 5th Guards Tank Army, which launched Operation Rumyantsev a couple of weeks later. The result was a battle of attrition Manstein's forces were ill-prepared for and which they had little chance of winning.

During Operation Citadel, the Luftwaffe flew 27,221 sorties in support with 193 combat losses (a 0.709 per cent loss rate per sortie). Soviet units from 5 to 8 July conducted 11,235 sorties with combat losses of 556 aircraft (4.95 per cent per sortie). Germans were destroying Soviet aircraft at a ratio of 1:2.88. Despite German unit performance, the Wehrmacht was now lacking strategic reserves. In late 1943 just 25 per cent of Luftwaffe day fighters were on the Eastern Front, due to British and US air attacks on Italy and Germany.

== Soviet Kursk Strategic Offensive Operation ==
Soviet counteroffensive, 12 July – 23 August 1943.

During the defensive preparations in the months leading up to Citadel, the Soviets also planned and prepared counteroffensive operations that would be launched after the German offensive had halted.

=== In the north: Operation Kutuzov ===
Soviet offensive operations were planned to begin after the strength of the German forces had been dissipated by their Kursk offensive. As the German momentum in the north slowed, the Soviets launched Operation Kutuzov on 12 July against Army Group Centre in the Orel salient, directly north of the Kursk salient. The Bryansk Front, under the command of Markian Popov, attacked the eastern face of the Orel salient while the Western Front, commanded by Vasily Sokolovsky, attacked from the north. The Western Front's assault was led by the 11th Guards Army, under Lieutenant General Ivan Bagramyan, and was supported by the 1st and 5th Tank Corps. The Soviet spearheads sustained heavy casualties, but pushed through and in some areas achieved significant penetrations. These thrusts endangered German supply routes and threatened the 9th Army with encirclement. With this threat, 9th Army was compelled to go over fully to the defensive.

The thinly stretched 2nd Panzer Army stood in the way of this Soviet force. The German commanders had been wary of such an attack and forces were quickly withdrawn from the Kursk offensive to meet the Soviet offensive.

Operation Kutuzov reduced the Orel salient and inflicted substantial losses on the German military, paving the way for the liberation of Smolensk. Soviet losses were heavy, but were replaced. The offensive allowed the Soviets to seize the strategic initiative, which they retained for the remainder of the war.

=== In the south: Operation Rumyantsev ===
Operation Polkovodets Rumyantsev was intended as the main Soviet offensive for 1943. Its aim was to destroy the 4th Panzer Army and Army Detachment Kempf, and cut off the extended southern portion of Army Group South. After the heavy losses sustained by the Voronezh Front during Citadel, the Soviets needed time to regroup and refit, delaying the start of the offensive until 3 August. Diversionary attacks, launched two weeks earlier across the Donets and Mius Rivers into the Donbas, drew the attention of German reserves and thinned the defending forces that would face the main blow. The offensive was initiated by the Voronezh Front and Steppe Fronts against the northern wing of Army Group South. They drove through the German positions, making broad and deep penetrations. By 5 August, the Soviets had liberated Belgorod.

By 12 August, the outskirts of Kharkov had been reached. The Soviet advance was finally halted by a counter-attack by the 2nd and 3rd SS Panzer Divisions. In the ensuing tank battles, the Soviet armies suffered heavy losses in armour. After this setback, the Soviets focused on Kharkov. After heavy fighting the city was liberated on 23 August. This battle is referred to by the Germans as the Fourth Battle of Kharkov, while the Soviets refer to it as the Belgorod–Kharkov offensive operation.

== Results ==
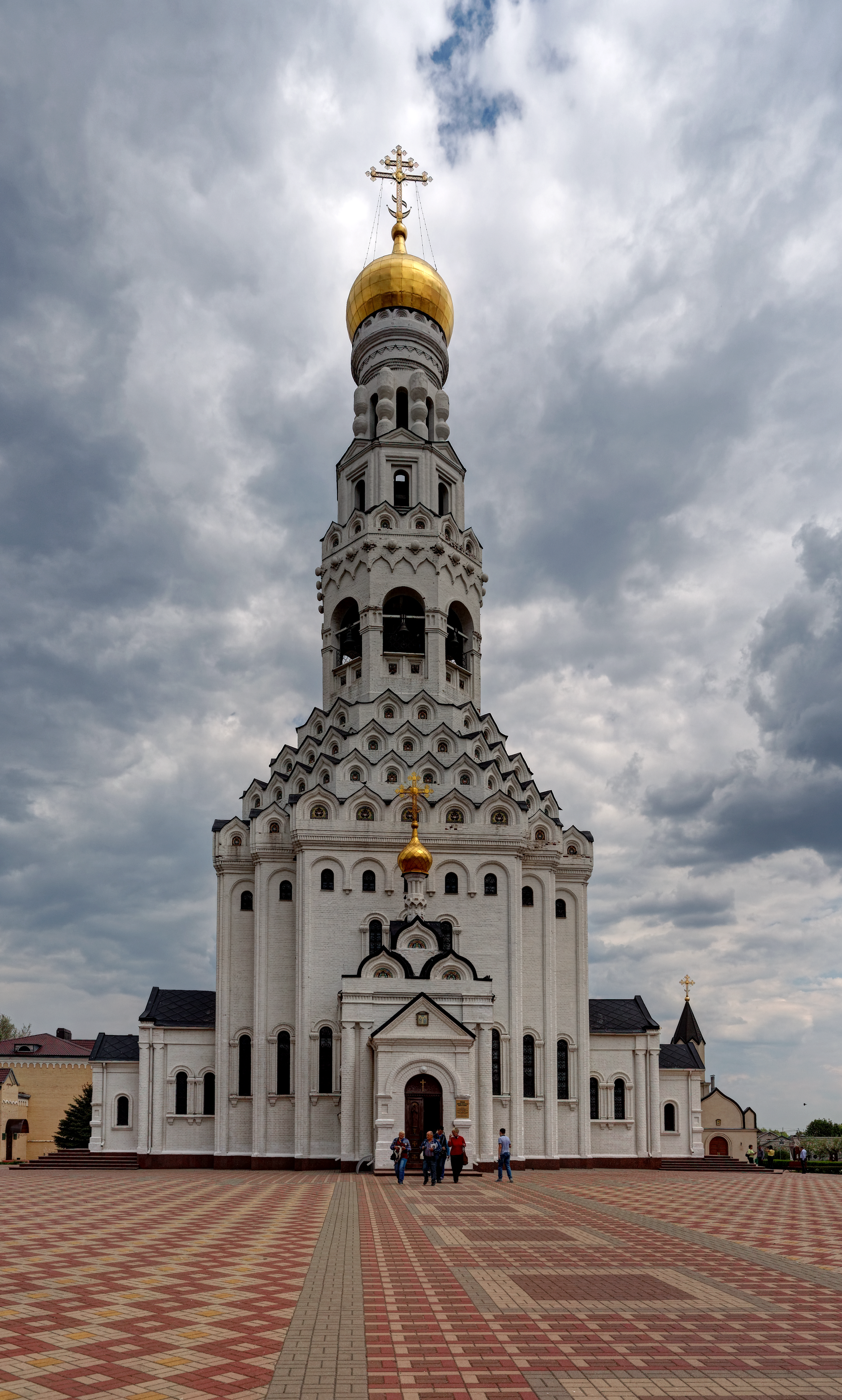
Prokhorovka Cathedral, in Prokhorovka on the former battlefield, commemorates the Red Army losses and victory.

The campaign was a strategic Soviet success. For the first time, a major German offensive had been stopped before achieving a breakthrough; the maximum depth of the German advance was 8–12 kilometres (5.0–7.5 mi) in the north and 35 kilometres (22 mi) in the south. The Germans, despite using more technologically advanced armour than in previous years, were unable to break through the deep Soviet defences and were caught off guard by the significant operational reserves of the Red Army. This result changed the pattern of operations on the Eastern Front, with the Soviet Union gaining the operational initiative. The Soviet victory was costly, with the Red Army losing considerably more men and materiel than the German Army. The Soviet Union's larger industrial potential and pool of manpower allowed them to absorb and replace its losses. Guderian wrote:

With the failure of Zitadelle we have suffered a decisive defeat. The armoured formations, reformed and re-equipped with so much effort, had lost heavily in both men and equipment and would now be unemployable for a long time to come. It was problematical whether they could be rehabilitated in time to defend the Eastern Front ... Needless to say the [Soviets] exploited their victory to the full. There were to be no more periods of quiet on the Eastern Front. From now on, the enemy was in undisputed possession of the initiative.

With victory, the initiative firmly passed to the Red Army. For the remainder of the war the Germans were limited to reacting to Soviet advances, and were never able to regain the initiative or launch a major offensive on the Eastern Front. British historian Robin Cross stated that "the Red Army had turned the tide at Stalingrad; it had seized the psychological advantage for the first time. But it was in the terrible killing grounds near Kursk that Hitler's panzers, and his ambitions, were dealt a blow from which they never recovered" and that "Failure at Kursk had dealt the Ostheer heavier psychological and material blows than it had suffered at Stalingrad". Further, the Western Allied landings in Italy opened a new front, further diverting German resources and attention.

Soviet air forces dropped about 20,000 tons of bombs during the battle, 4 times more than in the Battle of Moscow, and 2.5 times more than in the Battle of Stalingrad.

Though the location, plan of attack and timing were determined by Hitler, he blamed the defeat on his General Staff. Unlike Stalin, who gave his commanding generals the liberty to make important command decisions, Hitler's interference in German military matters progressively increased while his attention to the political aspects of the war decreased. The opposite was true for Stalin; throughout the Kursk campaign, he trusted the judgment of his commanders, and as their decisions led to battlefield success, it increased his trust in their military judgment. Stalin stepped back from operational planning, only rarely overruling military decisions, resulting in the Red Army being entrusted with higher levels of autonomy during the war.

All told, 239 Red Army personnel were awarded the USSR's highest degree of distinction, the title Hero of the Soviet Union (HSU), for their valour in the Battle of Kursk. Two women, Guards Senior Sergeants Mariya Borovichenko and Zinaida Mareseva, were awarded the HSU title posthumously for their valour under fire while serving as combat medics. Borovichenko was assigned to the 32nd Guards Artillery Regiment, 13th Guards Rifle Division, 5th Guards Army and Mareseva served in a medical platoon in the 214th Guards Rifle Regiment, 73rd Guards Rifle Division, 7th Guards Army.

The Battle of Kursk is cited by some as being the true turning point of the European theatre of World War II, although this view has frequently been criticized.

== Casualties ==
Soldier Antonius John who participated in the battle expressed that:

events were on an apocalyptic scale. Scenes like the end of the world threatened to drive a person witnessing them to despair unless he had nerves of steel. Verdun, the Somme, and Stalingrad are comparable dates from history.

The casualties suffered by the two combatants are difficult to determine, due to several factors. German equipment losses were complicated by the fact that they made determined efforts to recover and repair tanks. Tanks disabled one day might be back in action the next day. German personnel losses are clouded by the lack of access to German unit records, which were seized at the end of the war. Many were transferred to the United States national archives and were not made available until 1978, while others were taken by the Soviet Union, which declined to confirm their existence.

=== Soviet losses ===
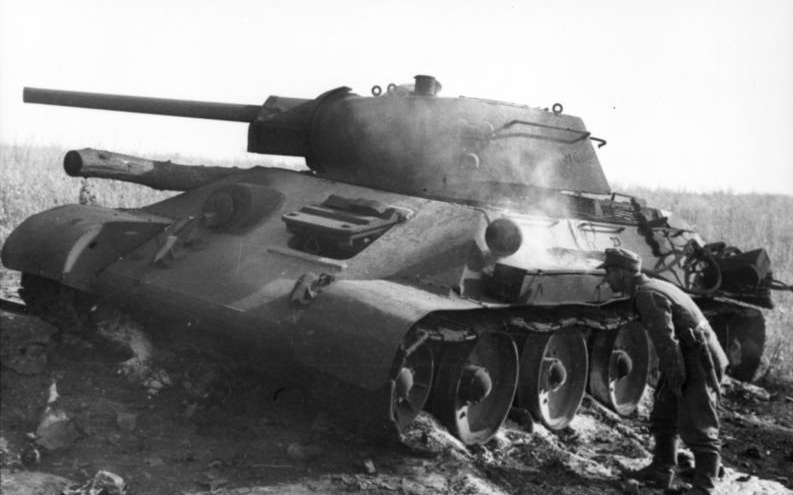
A German soldier inspects a knocked out T-34 during the Battle of Kursk at Pokrovka, 40 kilometres (25 mi) southwest of Prokhorovka.

The Russian military historian Grigoriy Krivosheyev, who based his figures on the Soviet archives, is considered by historian David Glantz as the most reliable source for Soviet casualty figures. Krivosheyev calculated total Soviet losses during the German offensive as 177,877. The Central Front suffered 15,336 irrecoverable casualties and 18,561 medical casualties, for a total of 33,897. The Voronezh Front suffered 27,542 irrecoverable casualties and 46,350 medical casualties, for a total of 73,892. The Steppe Front suffered 27,452 irrecoverable casualties and 42,606 medical casualties, for a total of 70,085.

During the two Soviet offensives, total casualties amounted to 685,456 men. During Operation Kutuzov, Soviet losses amounted to 112,529 irrecoverable casualties and 317,361 medical casualties, for a total loss of 429,890. The Western Front reported 25,585 irrecoverable casualties and 76,856 medical casualties. The Bryansk Front suffered 39,173 irrecoverable casualties and 123,234 medical casualties. The Central Front lost 47,771 irrecoverable casualties and 117,271 medical casualties. Soviet losses during Operation Polkovodets Rumyantsev totaled 255,566 men, with 71,611 listed as irrecoverable casualties and 183,955 as medical casualties. The Voronezh Front lost 48,339 irrecoverable casualties and 108,954 medical casualties, for a total of 157,293. The Steppe Front lost 23,272 irrecoverable casualties and 75,001 medical casualties, for a total of 98,273.

Chris Bellamy notes that Soviet losses at Kursk had reached a more normal ratio of killed to wounded than in the years before, specifically 1:3, which indicated improved Soviet medical and evacuation procedures. Bellamy calculates Soviet losses at 9,360 per day in the defensive phase, and 23,483 casualties daily in the follow counteroffensives.

The German historian Roman Töppel states that official Soviet losses are underestimated by 40%, giving a number of 1.2 million, with him having consulted armies and units archives. Further, Töppel notes Russian historians critical of the official report estimate losses ranging from 910,000 to 2.3 million men, with Russian historian Boris Sokolov going as high as 999,300 Soviet casualties at Kursk. Sokolov places the losses of the Red Army much higher, giving the figures of 450,000 killed, 50,000 missing (POWs), and 1.2 million wounded throughout the course of the battle, which Glantz states might be inflated, but nonetheless acknowledges that official Soviet figures are most likely conservative. Karl-Heinz Frieser also mentions Sokolov and states that Soviet losses are clearly understated. However, many Russian historians, sociologists and publicists consider the data on the losses of the Red Army during the Great Patriotic War, given in the publications of Sokolov, to be unreliable. In 2016, he was expelled from the Free Historical Society for "inappropriate handling of historical sources and incorrect quoting of other people's works".

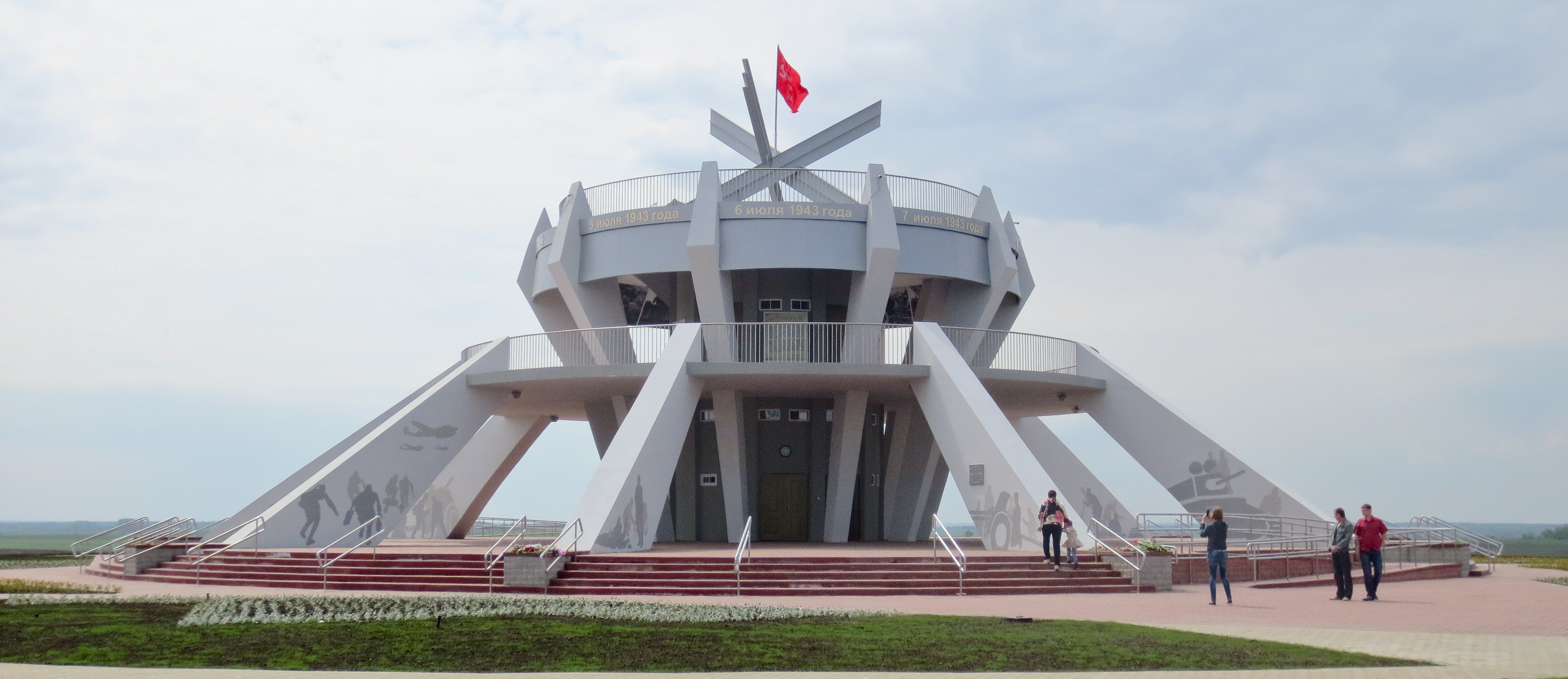
Memorial "Teplovsky's Hills" in Ponyri region in honour of the memory of the fallen on the northern face of the Battle of Kursk

Soviet equipment losses during the German offensive came to 1,614 tanks and self-propelled guns destroyed or damaged of the 3,925 vehicles committed to the battle. Soviet losses were roughly three times those of the Germans. During Operation Kutuzov, 2,349 tanks and self-propelled guns were lost out of an initial strength of 2,308; a loss of over 100 percent. During Polkovodets Rumyantsev, 1,864 tanks and self-propelled guns were lost out of the 2,439 employed. The loss ratio suffered by the Soviets was roughly 5:1 in favour of the Germans. Large Soviet reserves of equipment and their high rate of tank production enabled the Soviet tank armies to quickly replace lost equipment and maintain their fighting strength. The Red Army repaired many of its damaged tanks; many Soviet tanks were rebuilt up to four times to keep them in the fight. Soviet tank strength went back up to 2,750 tanks by 3 August due to the repair of damaged vehicles.

According to the historian Christer Bergström, VVS losses during the German offensive amounted to 677 aircraft on the northern flank and 439 on the southern flank. Total casualties are uncertain. Bergström's research indicates total Soviet air losses between 12 July and 18 August, during the German offensive and the Operation Kutuzov counteroffensive, were 1,104 aircraft. Frieser states that the official Soviet figure of 1,626 planes lost "seems completely unbelievable", and cites Sokolov's minimum of 3,300 and cites Luftwaffe as being more reliable due to the strictness of data, with 4,209 Soviet planes downed.

=== German losses ===
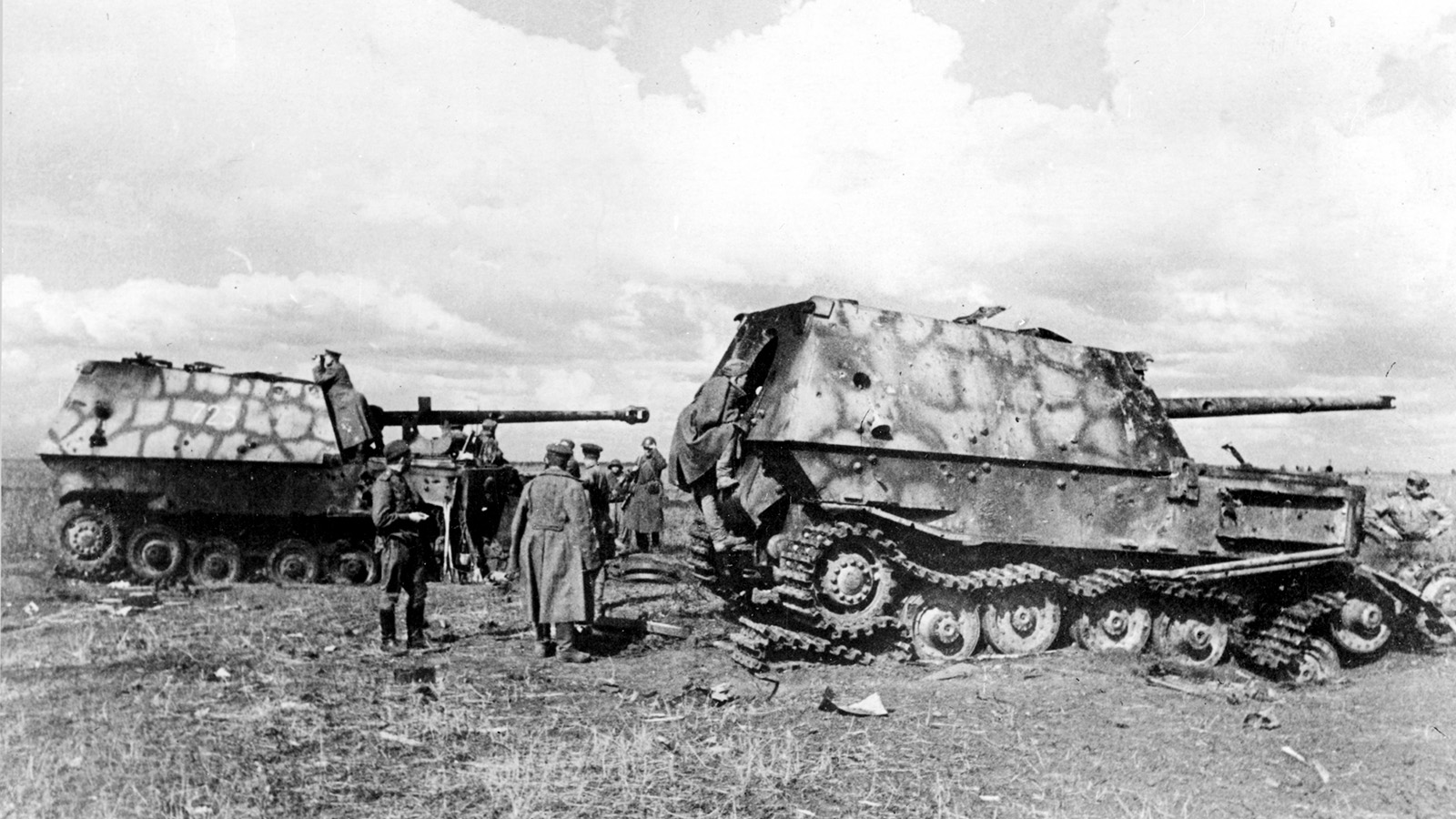
Soviet troops inspecting destroyed Ferdinands on the Orel sector

Karl-Heinz Frieser, who reviewed the German archive record, calculated that during Citadel 54,182 casualties were suffered. Of these, 9,036 were killed, 1,960 were reported missing and 43,159 were wounded. The 9th Army suffered 23,345 casualties, while Army Group South suffered 30,837 casualties. Throughout the Soviet offensives, 111,114 casualties were suffered. In facing Operation Kutuzov, 14,215 men were killed, 11,300 were reported missing (presumed killed or captured) and 60,549 were wounded. During Polkovodets Rumyantsev, 25,068 casualties were incurred, including 8,933 killed and missing. Total casualties for the three battles were approximately 170,000, with 46,500 killed or missing (per German military medical data).

However, German personnel losses are clouded by the lack of access to German unit records, which were seized at the end of the war. Heeresarzt 10-day casualty reports per army/army group are based on the reports of the German troops, the numbers are understated. According to the 10-day reports, the losses of the 6th German Army from 11 to 31 August 1943 were only 5,122 men (in the report of the commander of this army, General Carl Holidt, and the commander of the GA "South", von Manstein, they reported this army lost 6,814 non-commissioned officers and soldiers only from 18 to 21 August). According to Niklas Zetterling with Anders Frankson, the 9th German Army lost from 4 to 9 July 1943 were 26,692 men; 1.46 times more than Heeresarzt 10-day reports. According to Stephen Newton, as of 5 July, the average number of infantry divisions in the 4th Tank Army and OG "Kempf" was 17,369, while the tank and motorized divisions were 18,410. On 30 August 1943, the average number of infantry divisions in the 4th Tank Army and OG "Kempf" was 8,269 men, and the tank and motorized divisions 10,745 men. Then the average loss of personnel in the Battle of Kursk (excluding replenishment) is the same for infantry divisions: 9,100 men (52%); for tank and motorized divisions: 7,665 men (41%). At the same time, the losses of Army Group Center in the Battle of Kursk can be estimated by extrapolating the above estimate of the losses of the 4th Panzer Army and OG Kempf to the losses of Army Group Center. It should be considered that the losses of the Wehrmacht in the Battle of Kursk were 380,000 to 430,000 men.

According to modern historians Chris Bellamy and Max Hastings, the Wehrmacht lost over half a million killed, wounded, missing or captured in the Kursk area. Specifically, thirty of seventy German divisions in the area had been destroyed, with German casualties amounting to some 10,000 losses a day. Bellamy estimates Soviet to German casualty ratios at Kursk at roughly 1.5 to 1.

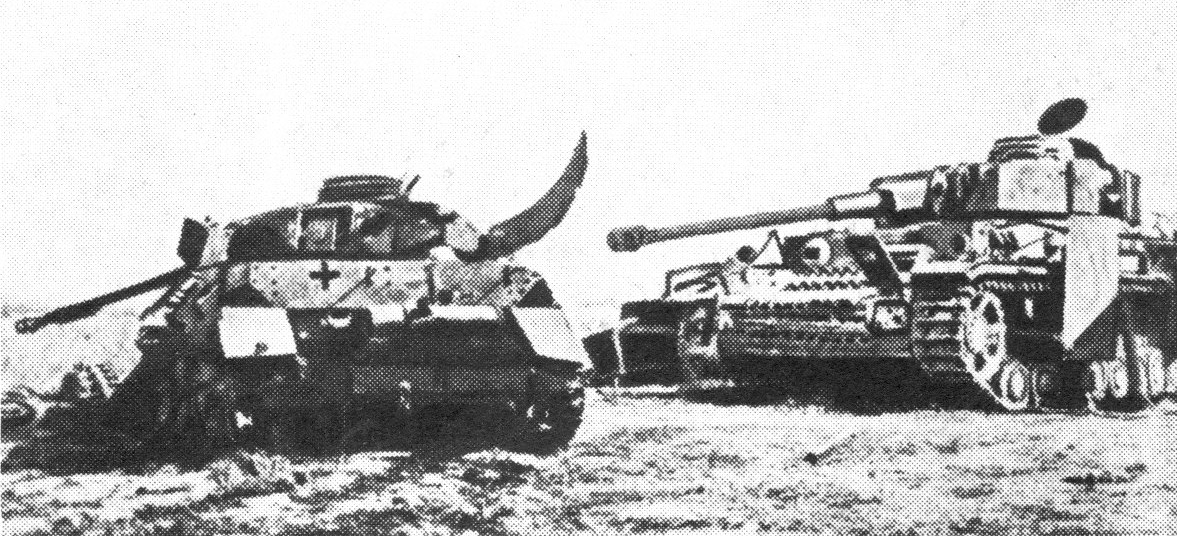
Panzer IV tanks destroyed at Kursk

During Citadel, 252 to 323 tanks and assault guns were destroyed. By 5 July, when the Battle of Kursk started, there were only 184 operational Panthers. Within two days, this had dropped to 40. On 17 July 1943, after Hitler had ordered a stop to the German offensive, Guderian sent in the following preliminary assessment of the Panthers,

Due to enemy action and mechanical breakdowns, the combat strength sank rapidly during the first few days. By the evening of 10 July there were only 10 operational Panthers in the frontline. 25 Panthers had been lost as total write-offs (23 were hit and burnt and two had caught fire during the approach march). A hundred Panthers were in need of repair (56 were damaged by hits and mines and 44 by mechanical breakdown) and 60 percent of the mechanical breakdowns could be easily repaired. Approximately 40 Panthers had already been repaired and were on the way to the front. About 25 still had not been recovered by the repair service ... On the evening of 11 July, 38 Panthers were operational, 31 were total write-offs and 131 were in need of repair. A slow increase in the combat strength is observable. The large number of losses by hits (81 Panthers up to 10 July) attests to the heavy fighting.

By 16 July, Army Group South counted 161 tanks and 14 assault guns lost. Up to 14 July, the 9th Army reported they had lost as write-offs 41 tanks and 17 assault guns. These losses break down as 109 Panzer IVs, 42 Panthers, 38 Panzer IIIs, 31 assault guns, 19 Ferdinands, 10 Tigers and three flame tanks. Before the Germans ended their offensive at Kursk, the Soviets began their counter-offensive and pushed the Germans back into a steady retreat. Thus, a report on 11 August 1943 showed that the numbers of write-offs in Panthers swelled to 156, with only 9 operational. The German Army was forced into a fighting retreat and increasingly lost tanks in combat as well as from abandoning and destroying damaged vehicles. On the Eastern Front, 50 Tiger tanks were lost during July and August, with some 240 damaged. Most of these occurred during their offensive at Kursk. Between 600 and 1,612 tanks and assault guns sustained damage in the period from 5 to 18 July. The total number of German tanks and assault guns destroyed during July and August on the Eastern Front amount to 1,331. Of these, Frieser estimates that 760 were destroyed during the Battle of Kursk. and Beevor writes that "the Red Army had lost five armoured vehicles for every German panzer destroyed". Töppel's estimate is higher, up to 1,200 were destroyed. In total at least 2,952 German tanks and assault guns were destroyed or damaged during the battle of Kursk.

Frieser reports Luftwaffe losses at 524 aircraft, with 159 lost during the German offensive, 218 destroyed during Operation Kutuzov and 147 lost during Operation Polkovodets Rumyantsev. In reviewing the reports of the quartermaster of the Luftwaffe, Bergström presents different figures. Between 5 and 31 July, Bergström reports 681 aircraft lost or damaged (335 for Fliegerkorps VIII and 346 for Luftflotte 6) with 420 being written off (192 from Fliegerkorps VIII and 229 from Luftflotte 6).

The historian Karsten Heinz Schönbach criticizes that Western historiography stubbornly refers to German loss statistics without any form of critical source analysis. He notes that the formerly technical term "total loss" lost its purely technical meaning over the course of the war and developed into a euphemism. His investigation of the Wehrmacht maintenance and repair system revealed that the "total losses" were recorded for as long as possible as merely "undergoing repair". He quotes Hitler, who commented during a situation briefing on armored forces: "I keep hearing about short-term repairs, but they never actually happen; they always end up being delayed." Schönbach found that ultimately 40% to 50% of German tanks during Citadel were caught in a repair backlog, with most of these never returning to service. According to the historian Martin Moll Schönbach convincingly succeeds in proving that the German casualty reports were manipulated and have been misinterpreted by historians until now.

== See also ==
- Battle of Chawinda

== Sources ==
- Atkinson, Rick (2007). The Day of Battle, The War in Sicily and Italy, 1943–1944. The Liberation Trilogy. Vol. II. New York: Henry Holt. ISBN 978-0-8050-6289-2.
- Beevor, Antony (2012). The Second World War. New York: Back Bay Books. ISBN 978-0-316-02374-0.
- Bellamy, Christopher (October 2003). "Implications for Military and Strategic Thought". RUSI Journal. 148 (5): 84–88.
- Bergström, Christer (2007). Kursk – The Air Battle: July 1943. Hersham: Chevron/Ian Allan. ISBN 978-1-903223-88-8.
- Bergström, Christer [in Swedish] (2008). Bagration to Berlin – The Final Air Battle in the East: 1941–1945. Burgess Hill: Chevron/Ian Allan. ISBN 978-1-903223-91-8.
- Barbier, Mary Kathryn (2002). Kursk: The Greatest Tank Battle, 1943. Zenith Imprint. ISBN 978-0-760312-54-4.
- Brand, Dieter (2003). "Vor 60 Jahren: Prochorowka (Teil II)". Österreichische Militärische Zeitschrift (in German) (6). Bundesministerium für Landesverteidigung und Sport. Archived from the original on 1 November 2014.
- Bauman, Walter (1998). Kursk Operation Simulation and Validation Exercise – Phase II (KOSAVE II). Maryland: US Army Concepts Analysis Agency. Archived from the original (PDF) on 20 June 2013. – A study of the southern sector of the Battle of Kursk conducted by the US Army Concepts Analysis Agency and directed by Walter J. Bauman, using data collected from military archives in Germany and Russia by The Dupuy Institute (TDI).
- Citino, Robert M. (2012). The Wehrmacht Retreats: Fighting a Lost War, 1943. Lawrence: University Press of Kansas. ISBN 978-0-7006-1826-2.
- Citino, Robert; Parshall, Jonathan (2013). Kursk, The Epic Armored Engagement. 2013 International Conference on WWII. via the official channel of The National WWII Museum; session by the historians. Archived from the original on 11 December 2021.
- Clark, Lloyd (2012). Kursk: The Greatest Battle: Eastern Front 1943. London: Headline Publishing Group. ISBN 978-0-7553-3639-5.
- Copeland, B. Jack. "Colossus, The First Large Scale Electronic Computer". colossus-computer.com.
- Corum, James (January 1995). "The Luftwaffe's Army Support Doctrine, 1918–1941". The Journal of Military History. 59 (1): 53–76. doi:10.2307/2944364. ISSN 1543-7795. JSTOR 2944364.
- Dunn, Walter (1997). Kursk: Hitler's Gamble, 1943. Westport, Conn.: Greenwood Press. ISBN 978-0-275-95733-9.
- Empric, Bruce E. (2020). Tigers on the Steppe: Red Army Valor in the Battle of Kursk. Seattle: Teufelsberg Press. ISBN 979-8-6316-6333-6.
- Ferguson, Niall (2006). The War of the World: Twentieth-Century Conflict and the Descent of the West. New York: Penguin Publishing. ISBN 1-59420-100-5.
- Frieser, Karl-Heinz; Schmider, Klaus; Schönherr, Klaus; Schreiber, Gerhard; Ungváry, Kristián; Wegner, Bernd (2007). Die Ostfront 1943/44 – Der Krieg im Osten und an den Nebenfronten [The Eastern Front 1943–1944: The War in the East and on the Neighbouring Fronts]. Das Deutsche Reich und der Zweite Weltkrieg [Germany and the Second World War] (in German). Vol. VIII. München: Deutsche Verlags-Anstalt. ISBN 978-3-421-06235-2.
- Frieser, Karl-Heinz (2017). Germany and the Second World War: The Eastern Front 1943–1944: The War in the East and on the Neighbouring Fronts. Vol. VIII (1st ed.). Oxford University Press. ISBN 978-0-19-872346-2.
- Gerwehr, Scott; Glenn, Russell W. (2000). The Art of Darkness: Deception and Urban Operations. Santa Monica: Rand. ISBN 0-8330-4831-7.
- Glantz, David M. (September 1986). "Soviet Defensive Tactics at Kursk, July 1943" (PDF). U.S. Army Command and General Staff College. Soviet Army Studies Office Combined Arms Center Combat Studies Institute (CSI Report No. 11). Ft. Belvoir. OCLC 320412485. Archived from the original (PDF) on 18 May 2015.
- Glantz, David M. (1989). Soviet Military Deception in the Second World War. London: Routledge. ISBN 978-0-7146-3347-3.
- Glantz, David M.; House, Jonathan (1995). When Titans Clashed: How the Red Army Stopped Hitler. Lawrence: University of Kansas Press. ISBN 978-0-7006-0899-7.
- Glantz, David M.; Orenstein, Harold S. (1999). The Battle for Kursk 1943: The Soviet General Staff Study. London; Portland, OR: Frank Cass. ISBN 0-7146-4933-3. – This report, commissioned by the Soviet General Staff in 1944, was designed to educate the Red Army on how to conduct war operations. It was classified secret until its declassification in 1964, and was subsequently translated to English and edited by Orenstein and Glantz. Its original title was Collection of materials for the study of war experience, no. 11 (Russian: Сборник материалов по изучению опыта Великой Отечественной войны № 11, romanized: Sbornik materialov po izucheniiu opyta Velikoi Otechestvennoi voiny № 11)
- Glantz, David M.; House, Jonathan M. (2004) [1999]. The Battle of Kursk. Lawrence: University Press of Kansas. ISBN 978-0-7006-1335-9.
- Glantz, David M. (2013). Soviet Military Intelligence in War. London: Taylor & Francis. ISBN 978-1-136-28934-7.
- Grazhdan, Anna (director); Artem Drabkin & Aleksey Isaev (writers); Valeriy Babich, Vlad Ryashin, et al. (producers) (2011). Operation Barbarossa (television documentary). Soviet Storm: World War II in the East. Star Media. Archived from the original on 2 April 2015.
- Guderian, Heinz (1937). Achtung – Panzer!. Sterling Press.
- Guderian, Heinz (1952). Panzer Leader. New York: Da Capo.
- Hartmann, Christian (2013). Operation Barbarossa:Nazi Germany's War in the East, 1941–1945 (First ed.). Oxford: Oxford University Press. ISBN 978-0-19-966078-0.
- Healy, Mark (1992). Kursk 1943: Tide Turns in the East. Campaign 16. London: Osprey. ISBN 978-1-85532-211-0.
- Healy, Mark (2010). Zitadelle: The German Offensive Against the Kursk Salient 4–17 July 1943. Stroud: History Press. ISBN 978-0-7524-5716-1.
- Jacobsen, Hans Adolf; Rohwer, Jürgen (1965). Decisive battles of World War II; the German view. New York: Putnam. OCLC 1171523193.
- Jentz, Tom; Doyle, Hillary (1993). Tiger I Heavy Tank 1942–45. New Vanguard No.5. illustrated by Peter Sarson. Osprey Publishing. ISBN 978-1-85532-337-7.
- Jentz, Thomas (1995). Germany's Panther Tank. Atglen: Schiffer Pub. ISBN 0-88740-812-5.
- Kasdorf, Bruno (6 April 2000), The Battle of Kursk – An Analysis of Strategic and Operational Principles (PDF), U.S. Army War College
- Krivosheev, Grigoriy (1997). Soviet Casualties and Combat Losses in the Twentieth Century. London: Greenhill Books. ISBN 1-85367-280-7.
- Krivosheev, Grigoriy (2001). Россия и СССР в войнах XX века: Потери вооруженных сил: Статистическое исследование [Russia and the USSR in the Wars of the 20th Century: Loss of Armed Forces: Statistical Study] (in Russian). Moscow: Olma Press. ISBN 978-5-224-01515-3.
- Koltunov, Grigoriy; Solovyev, Boris (1970). Kurskaya bitva (in Russian). Moscow: Voenizdat. OCLC 1180810844.
- Liddell Hart, Basil Henry (1948). The German Generals Talk. New York: Morrow.
- Litvin, Nikolai; Britton, Stuart (2007). 800 Days on the Eastern Front: A Russian Soldier Remembers World War II. Modern War Studies. Lawrence: University of Kansas Press. ISBN 978-0-7006-1517-9.
- Willmott, Hedley Paul (1990). The Great Crusade: A new complete history of the Second World War. New York: Free Press. ISBN 978-0-02-934715-7.
- Moorhouse, Roger (2011). Berlin at war: Life and Death in Hitler's capital, 1939–45. London: Vintage. ISBN 978-0-09-955189-8.
- Muller, Richard (1992). The German Air War in Russia, 1941–1945. Baltimore: The Nautical & Aviation Publishing Company of America. ISBN 1-877853-13-5.
- Mulligan, Timothy P. (1987). "Spies, Ciphers and 'Zitadelle': Intelligence and the Battle of Kursk, 1943". Journal of Contemporary History. 22 (2): 235–260. doi:10.1177/002200948702200203. S2CID 162709461. Archived from the original (PDF) on 23 February 2009.
- Münch, Karlheinz (1997). Combat History of Schwere Panzerjäger Abteilung 653: Formerly the Sturmgeschütz Abteilung 197 1940–1942. Winnipeg: J. J. Fedorowicz Publishing. ISBN 0-921991-37-1.
- Murray, Williamson (1983). Strategy for defeat: the Luftwaffe, 1933–1945. Maxwell Air Force Base, Ala: Air University Press.
- Newton, Steven (2002). Kursk: The German View. Cambridge: Da Capo Press. ISBN 0-306-81150-2.
- Nipe, George (1998). "Kursk Reconsidered: Germany's Lost Victory". Archived from the original on 10 August 2015.
- Nipe, George (2011). Blood, Steel, and Myth: The II. SS-Panzer-Korps and the Road to Prochorowka, July 1943. Southbury, Conn.: Newbury. ISBN 978-0-9748389-4-6.
- Overy, Richard (1995). Why the Allies Won. New York: Norton Press. ISBN 978-0-393-03925-2.
- Roberts, Andrew (2012). The Storm of War: A New History of the Second World War. HarperCollins. ISBN 978-0-06-122860-5.
- Searle, Alaric (2017). Armoured Warfare: A Military, Political and Global History. Bloomsbury Publishing. ISBN 978-1-4411-9813-6.
- Showalter, Dennis E. (2013). Armor and Blood: The Battle of Kursk, The Turning Point of World War II. New York: Random House. ISBN 978-1-4000-6677-3.
- Showalter, Dennis (2013). "The Crucible". MHQ: The Quarterly Journal of Military History. 25 (3): 28–37.
- Taylor, A. J. P.; Kulish, V.M. (1974). A History of World War Two. London: Octopus Books. ISBN 0-7064-0399-1.
- Töppel, Roman [in German] (2017). Kursk 1943: Die größte Schlacht des Zweiten Weltkriegs [Kursk 1943: The Largest Battle of the Second World War] (in German). Paderborn: Schöningh. ISBN 978-3-506-78187-1.
- Weiss, Thomas J II (2000). "Fire Support at the Battle of Kursk". Field Artillery (4).
- Yeide, Harry (2014). Fighting Patton: George S. Patton Jr. Through the Eyes of His Enemies. Zenith Press. ISBN 978-0-7603-4592-4.
- Zamulin, Valeriy (2011). Demolishing the Myth: The Tank Battle at Prokhorovka, Kursk, July 1943: An Operational Narrative. Solihull: Helion & Company. ISBN 978-1-906033-89-7.
- Zetterling, Niklas; Frankson, Anders (2000). Kursk 1943: A Statistical Analysis. Cass Series on the Soviet (Russian) Study of War. London: Frank Cass. ISBN 0-7146-5052-8.
