= Kamenets–Podolsky pocket =

World War II battle

Coordinates: 49.0000°N 26.5000°E

Proskurov–Chernovtsy offensive operation
- Part of the greater Dnieper–Carpathian offensive on the Eastern Front of World War II
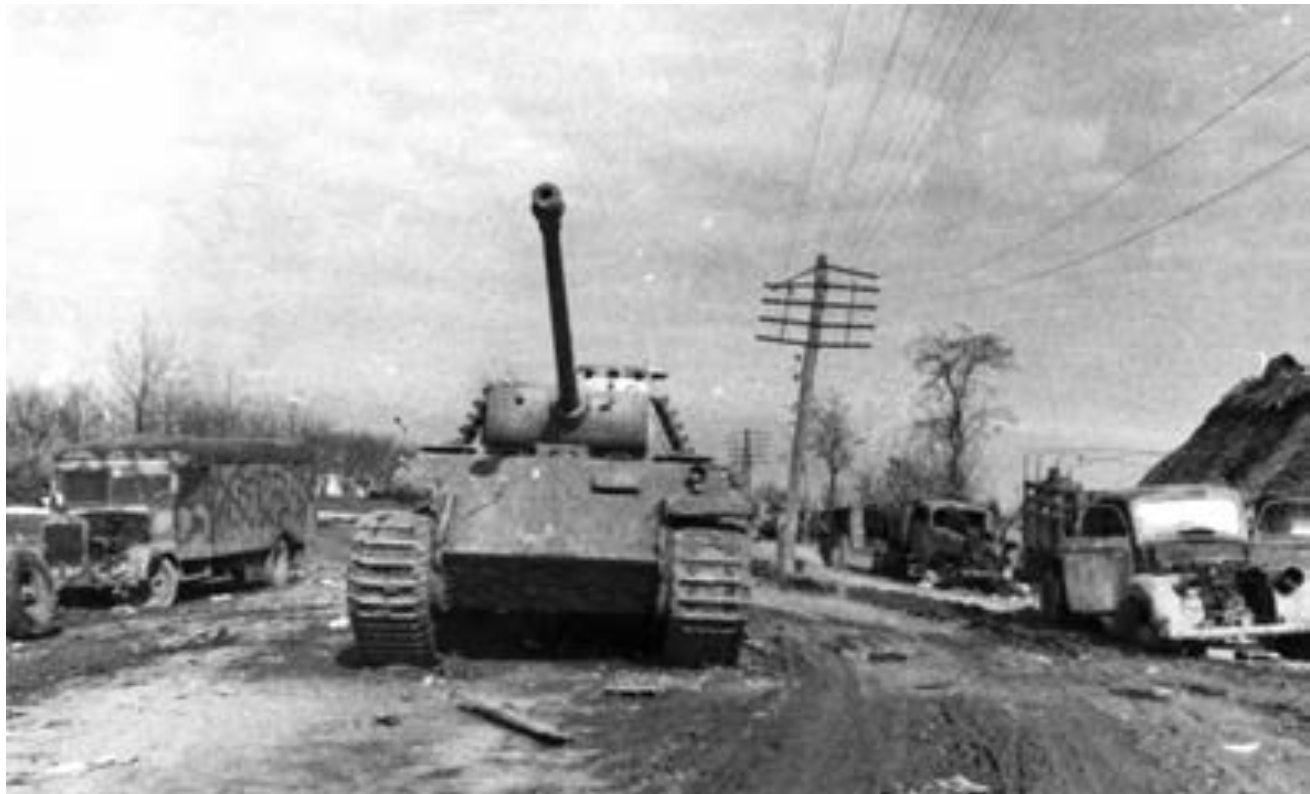
- Abandoned German Panther tank and motor vehicles in the area of Kamenets-Podolsky, spring 1944.
Date	4 March–17 April 1944; Offensive phases: 1st phase: 4–20 March 1944; 2nd phase: 21 March–17 April 1944; Kamenets-Podolsky pocket: 23 March–10 April 1944
Location	Western Ukraine/Eastern Poland, Soviet Union
Result	Strategic Soviet victory; 1st Panzer Army encircled, eventually breaks out, albeit debilitated; Army Group South split in two; Army Group South renamed to Army Group North Ukraine
Territorial changes	Expulsion of Axis forces from most of Ukraine; Red Army enters Eastern Poland

Belligerents
Germany; Hungary	Soviet Union

Commanders and leaders
(Nazi Germany) Adolf Hitler (Nazi Germany) Erich von Manstein (Army Group South) (Nazi Germany) Walther Model (Army Group North Ukraine) (Nazi Germany) Hans-Valentin Hube (1st Panzer Army) (Nazi Germany) Erhard Raus (4th Panzer Army) (Kingdom of Hungary (1920–1946)) Géza Lakatos (1st Army)	(Soviet Union) Joseph Stalin (Soviet Union) Georgi Zhukov (1st Ukrainian Front)

Units involved
March 1944: (Nazi Germany) Army Group South: (Nazi Germany) 1st Panzer Army; (Nazi Germany) 4th Panzer Army; (Kingdom of Hungary (1920–1946)) VII Army Corps; April 1944: (Nazi Germany) Army Group North Ukraine: (Nazi Germany) 1st Panzer Army; (Nazi Germany) 4th Panzer Army; (Kingdom of Hungary (1920–1946)) 1st Army	(Soviet Union) 1st Ukrainian Front

Strength
(Nazi Germany) On 1 March 1944: Army Group South GHQ units: 73,740; 1st Panzer Army: 211,545; 4th Panzer Army: 115,613; Total: 400,898 personnel; Combined AFV status for the 1st and 4th Panzer Armies, 1–5 March 1944: 164 operational tanks; 101 operational StuG's; 146 operational self-propelled AT guns; 411 operational AFVs in total 1st Panzer Army AFVs in repair, 18-21 February 1944: 355 tanks and 57 StuG's; (Kingdom of Hungary (1920–1946)) 1 March 1944: VII Army Corps: 29,500 personnel April 1944: 150,000–180,000 personnel (mobilization of the 1st Army); 30 tanks, 30 assault guns	(Soviet Union) On 1 March 1944: 1st Ukrainian Front: 861,270 ration strength; 646,842 combat forces; 1,409 operational tanks and self-propelled guns; 277 tanks and self-propelled guns in repair; 11,221 guns and mortars; 477 aircraft

Casualties and losses
(Nazi Germany) Germany; Personnel; Combined losses of the 1st and 4th Panzer Armies, March–April 1944; March: 57,049 killed, wounded, missing and sick in total April: 24,839 killed, wounded, missing and sick in total Total: 81,888; 1st Panzer Army: 45,000+ total losses 4th Panzer Army: 35,000+ total losses Material; Material losses of the 1st Panzer Army in the pocket: 322 tanks; 39 assault guns; 143 self-propelled anti-tank and artillery pieces; 707 armored personnel carriers and reckon vehicles; 22,389 motor vehicles; most of the artillery pieces lost; 6,675 horses killed or missing (for 11 March - 20 April); (Kingdom of Hungary (1920–1946)) Hungary; 1st Army losses for 17–30 April 1944 only: 15,571 killed, wounded and missing in total VII Army Corps in March 1944: Exact losses unknown, destroyed at the end of March 1944 Total Axis losses: ~100,000	(Soviet Union) Losses of the 1st Ukrainian Front; March: 111,354 killed, wounded and missing in total Material: 343 tanks (excl. 11-20 March); 78 self-propelled guns; 282 field guns of all calibers; 11 anti-aircraft guns; 182 mortars; 1,954 machine guns; 12,859 sub-machine guns; 19,627 rifles April: 93,200 killed, wounded and missing in total Material: 208 tanks; 56 self-propelled guns; 969 field guns of all calibers; 24 anti-aircraft guns; 646 mortars; 4,156 machine-guns; 23,596 sub-machine guns; 31,683 rifles; Total: 204,554 killed, wounded and missing in total; 551 tanks (incomplete for 11-20 March); 134 self-propelled guns; 1,251 field guns of all calibers; 35 anti-aircraft guns; 828 mortars; 6,110 machine guns; 36,455 sub-machine guns; 51,310 rifles

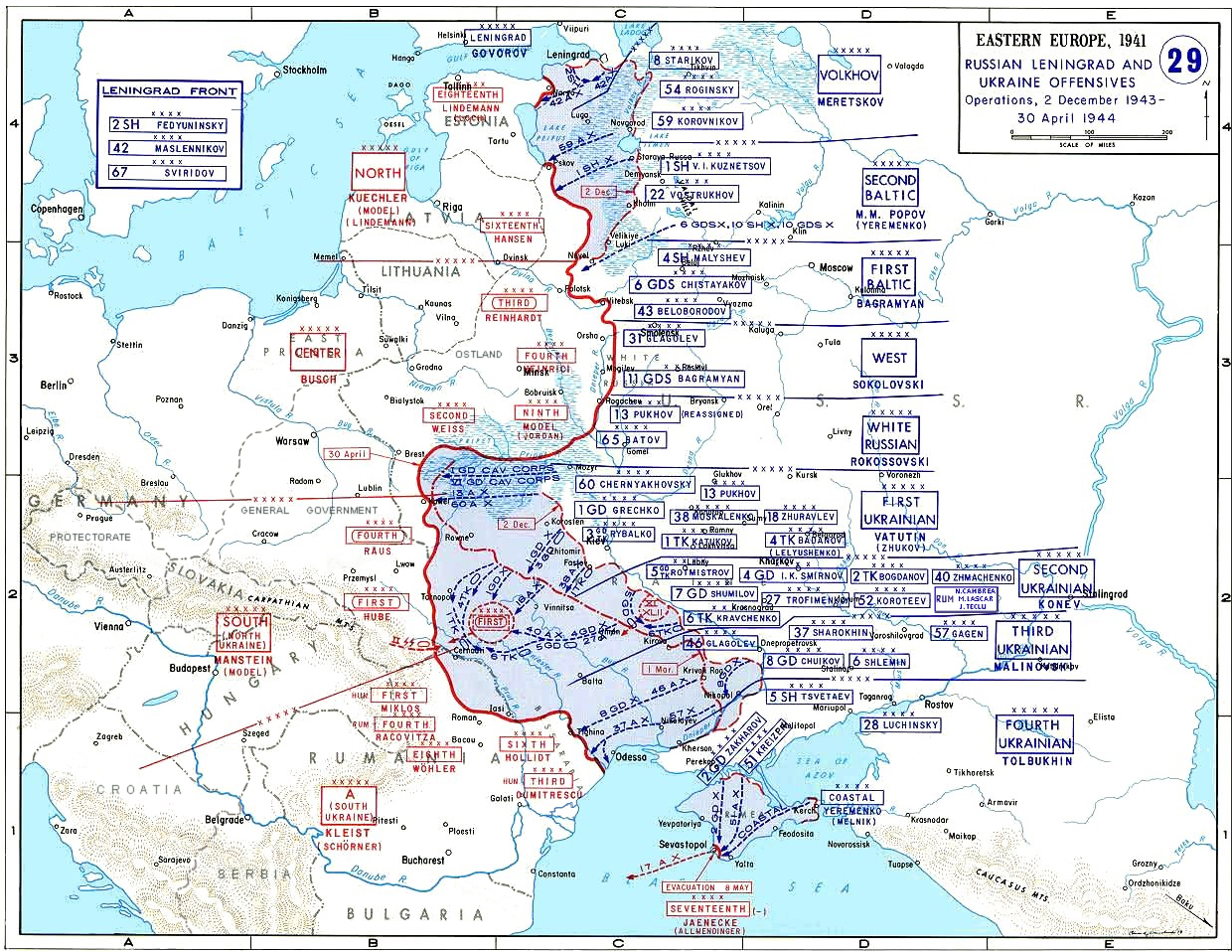
Eastern Front, December 1943 – April 1944

The Kamenets-Podolsky pocket (German: Kessel von Kamenez-Podolsk) was a key part of a major Soviet Proskurov-Chernovtsy Operation (Russian: Проскуровско-Черновицкая Операция), known on the German side by several names. It was conducted by the Soviet 1st Ukrainian Front against the German 1st and 4th Panzer Armies, and Hungarian forces of Army Group South in March-April 1944. The plan was to launch the main strike south, at the junction of the two German armies, thus cutting off the Lvov-Odessa railway line, vital for supplying Army Group South. The subsequent southerly advance to the Dniester aimed to cut off westward retreat routes for Army Group South, forcing it to use the long roundabout route through Romania for supply.

The offensive began on 4 March and the German front soon collapsed. By 10 March, the Lvov-Odessa railway was cut and the Soviets advanced 60–100 kilometers. At that point, the drive halted due to the arrival of German reserves and the logistical difficulties of advancing in rasputitsa. After regrouping and introducing the 1st Tank Army, the offensive resumed on 21 March, completely shattering the German front on the same day. On 23 March, the 1st Panzer Army lost contact with the 4th Panzer Army, and the 1st Tank Army reached the Dniester on 24 March. Major communication centers, notably Proskurov, Kamenets-Podolsky, and Chernovtsy, fell in rapid succession, encircling the 1st Panzer Army, which held a ration strength of 200,000 personnel. This encirclement, however, was incomplete, as understrength Soviet units operating on overextended lines over muddy terrain could not establish a tight ring, especially in the west. Moreover, anticipating a German breakout south across the Dniester, the Soviet command ordered the 1st Tank Army to the southern bank, which excluded it from active combat against the encircled forces.

The commander of the 1st Panzer Army, Generaloberst Hans Hube, intended to breakout south, as the Soviets had anticipated. However, Hube was overruled by Generalfeldmarschall Erich von Manstein, who insisted that the army must breakout to the west, relying on the element of surprise and because the Soviet forces there were weak. As a relief force attacking from the west, Manstein received the II SS Panzer Corps from France. The westward breakout, supported by a major Luftwaffe airlift, began in late March. Only at the start of April did the Soviet command realize German forces were breaking out westward. Parts of the 1st Tank Army were redeployed from southern bank of the Dniester, but this was hampered by the destruction of the river crossings by the Germans. On 4 April, the II SS Panzer Corps, whose arrival was undetected by the Soviets, struck from the west. By 10 April, contact between the 1st and 4th Panzer Armies was reestablished.

After the breakout, the 1st Panzer Army was greatly weakened. All of its divisions were rendered combat-ineffective or suitable only for limited defense. Losses in heavy weapons, armored and motor vehicles were enormous, leaving units with a small number of them. The army reported that most personnel broke out, but noted that only a small part of the 200,000 ration strength were combat troops. The infantry strength was reduced to a fraction of authorized levels, forcing the assignment of specialists and personnel from rear services to the frontline. The troops emerged from the pocket debilitated, suffering from malnutrition and severe lice infestations, with the logistical breakdown triggering a decrease in discipline. According to the army’s field post inspection office, the hardships of this campaign had a devastating impact on morale, with four-year veterans describing it as the most difficult experience of the war.

== Forces involved and names of this campaign ==
The offensive operation of the 1st Ukrainian Front, which began on 4 March and ended on 17 April 1944, was conducted against the German 1st and 4th Panzer Armies on the northern (or left) wing of Army Group South, as well as the Hungarian forces in the area of the Dniester and foothills of the Carpathians. It was the biggest and most important operation of the Dnieper-Carpathian offensive, encompassing a vast area. According to Manstein, in March 1944 the time had come "to foot the bill" for the German High Command's fundamental mistake of never wanting to give anything up - this northern wing of Army Group South was the "decisive spot", from which the Soviets could push the entire southern wing of the German armies southward toward the Black Sea or Romania. In the midst of this campaign, Manstein will be sacked by Hitler.

The right-wing forces and large parts of the main central grouping of the front were engaged against the German 4th Panzer Army (from north to south) in the area south of Kovel, Brody and Tarnopol regions. In the area south of Kovel, the forces of the front came into contact with the 2nd Belorussian Front, which was conducting the Polesskoe offensive (Battle of Kovel). Both Brody and Tarnopol were declared fortified places by Hitler and became areas of fierce fighting, with Tarnopol garrison being encircled and eventually destroyed- out of the original garrison of 4,600 troops, only 55 were able to escape by 18 April. Meanwhile, at the beginning of the offensive, the mass of the central grouping of the front was deployed at the boundary of the 1st and 4th Panzer Armies, between the areas of Tarnopol and Proskurov, through which the strategic Lvov-Odessa railway line was running. The left-wing forces of the front were deployed against the 1st Panzer Army and came into contact with the right wing of the 2nd Ukrainian Front, which was conducting the Uman–Botoșani offensive against the German 8th Army. From late March onwards, in the area south of the Dniester and foothills of the Carpathians, the Hungarian forces became actively engaged in combat- at first it was only the VII Army Corps, then from April the mobilized 1st Army, which in the middle of the month went on a local counteroffensive.

The whole March-April 1944 offensive of the 1st Ukrainian Front was named the Proskurov-Chernovtsy Operation (Проскуровско-Черновицкая Операция) by the Soviet side after the war. It was divided into two phases- the first phase lasted from 4 to 20 March, the second phase lasted from 21 March to 17 April, when Stavka from Moscow ordered the front to go on the defensive. It was early in the second phase of this Soviet offensive (on 23 March), when the simultaneous encirclement of the 1st Panzer Army in the Kamenets-Podolsky pocket and Tarnopol fortified place of the 4th Panzer Army had happened. By that point, the Soviet and German formations had been in non-stop combat for nearly 3 weeks.

For the German side, this campaign is known by several designations, as defined in the OKH document dated October 1944. Although the Soviet offensive was conducted against both German armies at the same time, the battles and their designations are divided separately by each army.

In the sector of the 1st Panzer Army, this campaign is known as the Defensive battle in the area of Vinnitsa - Yampol - Chernovits (Abwehrschlacht im Raum Winniza - Jampol - Tschernowitz), which lasted from 4 March to 10 April 1944. The Breakthrough battles at Kamenets-Podolsk (Durchbruchskämpfe bei Kamenez-Podolsk), which lasted from 26 March to 10 April 1944, are part of this. Although the army was cut off on 23 March, the start of the breakthrough battles is given as 26 March, because on that day Manstein's plan was given approval and the course was set for the army to breakout to the west, even though the actual breakout to the west did not begin until 28 March.

In the sector of the 4th Panzer Army, this campaign is known as the Fighting in the Tarnopol - Kovel area (Kämpfe im Raum Tarnopol - Kowel), which lasted from 3 March to 27 April 1944. It is divided into the following battles:

- Defensive Battle of Tarnopol and Brody (Abwehrschlacht von Tarnopol und Brody), 15 March - 20 April 1944;
- Defense of the Tarnopol Fortified Place (Verteidigung des Festen Platzes Tarnopol), 23 March - 16 April 1944;
- Battle of Kovel (Schlacht um Kowel), 14-26 March 1944;
- Defense of the Kovel Fortified Place (Verteidigung des Festen Platzes Kowel), 16-26 March 1944.

The Kovel area was located at the boundary of two army groups, thus there were elements from the 4th Panzer Army of Army Group South and 2nd Army of Army Group Center. The ending date for the battle in the Kovel area (26 March) is given for specific reason. On 27 March 1944, to simplify command arrangements, the boundary of the 4th Panzer Army and 2nd Army was pushed south of Kovel. Thus, from that day onwards, the Kovel Fortified Place, as well as the forces assembling to rescue the garrison of Kovel, were subordinated to the 2nd Army.

== Background ==
Throughout February, main forces of the 1st Ukrainian Front repulsed heavy blows from the units of the 1st Panzer Army in their attempts to de-blockade the trapped German forces at the Korsun-Cherkassy Pocket.

At the same time, the right wing of the 1st Ukrainian Front had executed the Rovno–Lutsk offensive, spearheaded by 2 Cavalry Corps. In the course of that operation, a new bulge was created, in which the Soviets dangerously hanged from the north over the 1st Panzer Army and the rest of the Army Group South in Ukraine.

It would be there, in the Shepetivka area, where Soviets will shift their main weight of attack. By striking south from that area towards the Dniester river, the 1st Panzer Army and all German forces operating in the right-bank Ukraine would be cut off from Germany and pressed against the Carpathian Mountains.

Furthermore, the Ternopil–Khmelnytskyi railway junction, which was part of a wider Lviv–Odessa railway, was a major German communication and supply center that linked together northern and southern portions of Army Group South. It was also the last railroad before the Carpathian Mountains. If this railroad was cut, the southern group of German forces would have to use the long roundabout route through the Balkans, with all of the supplies being rerouted over the Romanian railroads, which were in poor condition.

== Soviet preparations ==
On 18 February 1944, immediately after the end of the Battle of the Korsun-Cherkassy Pocket, the 1st Ukrainian Front received the task of carrying out a new offensive operation, which is known as the Proskurov-Chernovtsy Operation.

The 1st Ukrainian Front front had at its disposal the 13th, 60th, 1st Guards, 18th and 38th Combined-Arms Armies, 3rd Guards, 1st and 4th Tank Armies, 2nd Air Army, 4th Guards and 25th Tank Corps, 1st and 6th Guards Cavalry Corps.

The directive of the Supreme High Command (STAVKA) for this operation stated:

To prepare an offensive with the inclusion in the composition of the strike group of the front the troops of the 13th, 60th, 1st Guards Armies, 3rd Guards and 4th Tank Armies. To launch an attack from the front of Dubno, Shepetovka, Lyubar in a southerly direction with the task of smashing the German grouping in the area of Kremenets, Starokonstantinov, Tarnopol and seizing Berestechko, Brody, Tarnopol, Proskurov, Khmilniki areas. In the future, to advance in the general direction on Chortkov, in order to cut off the southern group of German forces the withdrawal paths westward in the area north of the Dniester river.

In the final form, the plan of the operation saw the main attack to be launched by the forces of the 13th, 60th, 1st Guards Combined-Arms Armies, 3rd Guards and 4th Tank Armies from the front of Torgovitsa, Shepetivka, Lyubar to the south in the general direction on Brody, Ternopil, Chortkiv, Khmelnytskyi. Secondary attacks were to be delivered by the 18th and 38th armies towards the Khmilnyk, Zhmerynka and Vinnytsia areas.

During the preparation of the operation, large re-grouping of the troops was carried out. Throughout the February 1944, the 1st Ukrainian Front participated in the Korsun-Shevchenkovsky Operation. Therefore, a significant number of front-line troops of the 1st Ukrainian Front by mid-February were on its left wing. The new operation required the creation of a strong strike force closer to the right wing. It was necessary to transfer the 3rd Guards Tank Army and a significant number of artillery, tank, engineering units from the Berdychiv area to the Shumsk region, to regroup the 60th and 1st Guards armies almost completely into their new lines, and also to move the 18th and 38th armies to the right wing as well. Meanwhile, the 4th Tank Army had to advance 350 kilometers from the area west of Kiev.

The huge transfer of forces 200–350 km westwards, through the deep spring mud or rasputitsa, as well as destroyed landscape, was extremely challenging. By the beginning of the operation, it was not possible to create the necessary fuel reserves. On the eve of the attack, fuel stocks for tank units dropped alarmingly to less than 3 day's supply. Despite this, Zhukov and the front command decided to launch the operation, as the mudslide intensified more and more, and every day of respite gave the Germans time to recover. It was taken into account that the additional amount of fuel would go to the troops on the 3rd or 4th day of the operation. However, the fuel and ammunition shortages would be a recurring issue.

The STAVKA and the front command paid great attention to ensuring the secrecy of the preparations- the Maskirovka. For this, a limited circle of people was involved in the development of a plan of operation, the telephone conversations on issues related to the upcoming operation were strictly forbidden. All troop movements were carried out at night or in daytime in conditions of poor visibility with the strictest camouflage measures. For the purpose of misinforming the Germans and misleading them regarding the true direction of the main attack, the concentration of rifle and tank forces was imitated in the 38th Army's sector and rumors about a large-scale offensive in the area were spread through the local population. All these measures had a positive effect: they ensured a surprise of the strike on the tactical level and forced the Germans to hold significant forces against the 18th and 38th armies.

All told, on the eve of the attack on 4 March 1944, on the 400 km front, the 1st Ukrainian Front numbered 646,842 combat troops, 11,221 artillery guns and mortars, 1,409 tanks and self-propelled guns, and 477 aircraft.

== German preparations ==
The Soviet 1st Ukrainian Front was opposed by the Wehrmacht's 1st and 4th Panzer Armies, belonging to Army Group South. It consisted of a total of 25 divisions (including 10 panzer and panzer-grenadier divisions), a motorized brigade, 2 heavy panzer battalions, 5 brigades of StuG assault guns, 2 consolidated groups and a large number of police, paramilitary, artillery, engineering, security and other units. These troops were supported by the 8th Air Corps of the Luftflotte 4.

The command of Army Group South watched with great concern the situation on its left flank, in the sector west of Lutsk, Shepetivka, which it considered, not without reason, one of the most vulnerable in its defense. The strike of the Soviet forces in this area to the south had very serious consequences- all German troops operating in Right-Bank Ukraine could have been cut off from the central regions of Germany and pressed against the Carpathian Mountains.

At the end of February 1944, when, in the opinion of the Germans, the danger of such an attack from the Soviet troops became particularly real, the German High Command took measures to strengthen the defense on the adjacent flanks of the 1st and 4th Panzer Armies. To this end, the troops of the 59th Army Corps and the 24th Tank Corps, defending in the area from Izyaslav to Ilintsy, were transferred from the 4th to the 1st Panzer Army, as a result of which the front of the 4th Panzer Army was significantly reduced.

But more important was the transfer of 5 panzer divisions (1st, 6th, 16th, 17th Panzer Divisions, 1st SS Panzer Division Leibstandarte SS Adolf Hitler) from the Uman direction to the area south of Yampol, Starokostiantyniv, the 7th Panzer Division from Dubno, the 357th and 359th Infantry Divisions from the reserve of the OKH in Germany and the 68th Infantry Division from Poland after refitting (badly damaged during the Zhitomir–Berdichev offensive). The Soviet intelligence was unable to detect this German regrouping in a timely manner. The appearance of six new German panzer divisions was discovered by the 1st Ukrainian Front only in the course of the operation that had already begun.

All told, on the eve of the Soviet attack on 4 March 1944, the German forces numbered 314,066 troops, 449 tanks, assault guns and self-propelled guns, some of which were in temporary repair, and 245 armoured personnel carriers. The 1st Panzer Army itself had 43 tanks and 50 assault guns. In addition, there were over 150 armored vehicles that were in the long term repair as a result of the damage sustained during the Battle of the Korsun-Cherkassy Pocket. Despite this, the 1st and 4th Panzer armies were the most powerful formations of Manstein's Army Group South.

== 1st phase of the operation: 4–21 March 1944 ==
=== Main direction: Battle of the Tarnopol-Proskurov railroad ===
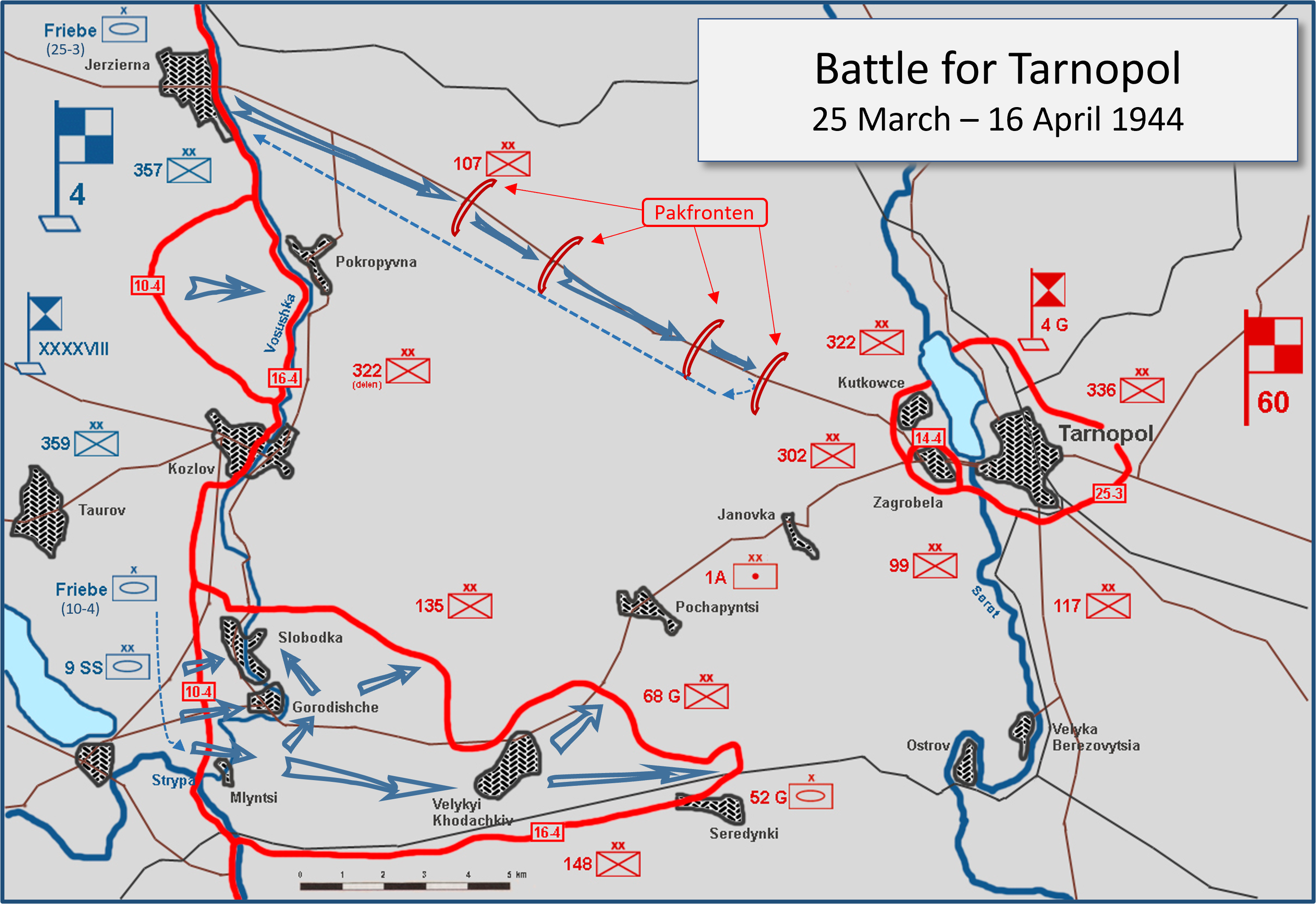
Map of the battle around Tarnopol (Ternopil) in March-April 1944

At 8 am on 4 March 1944, after massive artillery bombardment, the troops of the Soviet 60th and 1st Guards armies went on the offensive. Infantry and tanks broke through the first line of German fortifications. To develop success in the 60th Army's sector, the 4th and 3rd Guards Tank Armies were introduced.

In the first two days of the offensive, the troops of the shock group of the 1st Ukrainian Front overcame the German defenses on the 180-kilometer front and advanced 25 to 50 km. During the initial advance, the Soviet troops did not simply push the Germans back, but intercepted their escape routes. A group of German troops was surrounded and defeated in the area of Mokeevtsy (12 km south of Shepetivka), while under Teofipol (20 km south-east of Yampol), the Soviet units had surrounded and destroyed the German infantry regiment.

By the end of 10 March, the troops of the main front grouping had advanced 70–80 km.

The 28th Rifle Corps of the Soviet 60th Army fought battles against the German 357th Infantry Division, which had arrived from the reserve in Germany, and the Kampfgruppe (Battle Group) Prützmann east of Zalozhtsy. The 15th Rifle and 4th Guards Tank Corps of the 60th Army advanced to the approaches of Ternopil and on 9 March they started fighting for the city, where the Germans brought up parts of the 68th and 359th Infantry Divisions that arrived from Germany. The 23rd and 18th Guards Rifle Corps of the 60th Army, together with the troops of the 4th Tank Army, fought fierce battles in the Volochysk area with units of the 7th Panzer Division and the 1st SS Panzer Division Leibstandarte SS Adolf Hitler.

By 11 March, the troops of the 3rd Guards Tank Army advanced into the Chernyy Ostrov area, enveloping the Khmelnytskyi group of the Germans from the west. At the same time, the 1st Guards Army, developing an offensive from the Labun and Brazhentsy areas, on 9 March, with the assistance of the 7th Guards Tank Corps of the 3rd Guards Tank Army, captured Starokonstantinov and started fighting on the approaches to Proskurov, where the Germans brought significant reinforcements.

The 18th Army, having launched the offensive on 5 March, by the end of 10 March had advanced from 20 to 30 km and started fighting for Khmilnyk. On 11 March, the 38th Army began the attack, advancing 4–8 km in a day.

With a powerful blow launched at the junction of the 4th and 1st Panzer Armies, the Soviet troops tore open a 145-kilometer gap between these two armies and had cut the Lviv–Odessa railway, a key German supply artery and communication center, in the area of Ternopil–Proskurov.

The Germans, attaching great importance to the retention of this key railway junction, and the cities of Tarnopol and Proskurov, had put up a fierce resistance against the advancing Soviet troops. In the area from Tarnopol to Proskurov, the Germans had concentrated 9 panzer divisions (1st, 6th, 11th, 7th, 8th, 16th, 17th, 19th Panzer Divisions, 1st SS Panzer Division Leibstandarte SS Adolf Hitler), 3 infantry divisions that arrived from Germany (68th, 357th, 359th Infantry Divisions) and 2 StuG Assault Gun brigades (311th and 322nd) that arrived from France. Starting from 7 March, the German troops, panzer divisions foremost, began to launch counterattacks, seeking, at any cost, to push back from the railway the units of the 1st Ukrainian Front. A ferocious battle broke out between both sides across the entire front, running from Ternopil to Khmelnytskyi.

The ferocity of fighting in this area was noted by Zhukov in his memoirs:

"On March 7, a ferocious battle broke out here, the ferocity of which was not seen since the Battle of Kursk. For 8 days the enemy was trying to push our troops back to their starting position."

By 10 March, the general advance of the Soviet troops in the main direction had stopped. This was caused by the increased resistance of the Germans and the great difficulties of operating in the conditions of the spring thaw – rasputitsa. Tanks, artillery and vehicles moved with great difficulty. Sometimes ammunition had to be brought by foot, while fuel for tank forces was delivered by aircraft.

Between 10 and 20 March, both the Soviets and the Germans fought grueling battles against one another at the Tarnopol-Proskurov railway junction in an attempt to push the other one back. Neither side was able to push another back and as a result, the frontlines had temporarily stabilized.

Both sides had exhausted themselves in those battles. In particular, the German 68th Infantry Division, which participated in a counter-attack near the railway junction, had suffered significant losses. Within days, the strength of its 188th regiment had declined from 1,302 troops to 277, the strength of its 196th regiment had declined from 1,285 troops to 887, the strength of the 169th regiment had declined from 1,155 troops to 537, while the strength of the sapper battalion had declined from 444 troops to 284.

=== Soviet plans redefined ===
While the battle of the Tarnopol-Proskurov railroad was taking place, the STAVKA needed to clarify the goals and take additional measures to concentrate forces and assets on the direction of the main attack. On 10 March, the Military Council of the 1st Ukrainian Front presented to the Headquarters considerations for the further conduct of the operation.

The most significant moments of the refined plan of operation were the following:

1. A clearer targeting of both the right and left wings of the front at the encirclement and destruction of the German forces in the area north of the Dniester River
2. The intention not only to advance to the Dniester river but also to develop the offensive in both to the south and the southwest until the Soviet border was reached
3. The inclusion in the composition of the shock group of the front of the fresh 1st Tank Army, reinforcing the 60th Army with the 106th Rifle Corps (two divisions) and two more divisions from the reserve, reinforcing the 1st Guards Army with the 47th Rifle Corps (two divisions), the gradual withdrawal of the 3rd Guards Tank Army to the second echelon of the front for replenishment to take part in the future advances
4. Targeting the right wing of the 2nd Ukrainian Front for an offensive towards Mohyliv-Podilskyi and along the southern bank of the Dniester, with the aim of assisting the 1st Ukrainian Front in the encirclement of the 1st Panzer Army

In accordance with the instructions of the Stavka, the commander of the 1st Ukrainian Front, Zhukov, on 13 March set new tasks for the 1st Ukrainian Front.

The 13th Army received the task to launch an offensive operation and seize Berestechko, Brody, Dubno and Zaliztsi areas.

The 60th Army was to seize Ternopil and reach the line of Ozerna, Zolotniki.

The 1st Guards Army was ordered to concentrate the main efforts on the right flank, in cooperation with the 3rd Guards Tank Army, to free Khmelnytskyi, and develop an offensive towards Yarmolyntsi, Chortkiv.

The 1st and 4th Tank armies were planned to be introduced into battle in the 60th Army's sector, with the 1st Tank Army being ordered to develop an attack in the direction of Chortkiv, Chernivtsi, while the 4th Tank Army would advance towards Kamianets-Podilskyi.

The 18th and 38th armies received the task of seizing Vinnytsia and Zhmerynka and then to advance towards Kamianets-Podilskyi.

=== Secondary fronts: Dubno-Brody and Vinnitsa-Zhmerinka ===
After Soviets redefined their plans, the armies located on secondary fronts launched a series of attacks against the flanks of the 4th and 1st Panzer Armies. On 15 March, the troops of the Soviet 13th Army launched an offensive, striking one blow from the Torgovitsa area towards Brody with the forces of the 27th Rifle, 1st and 6th Guards Cavalry and 25th Tank Corps, and striking another blow from the region west of Shumsk towards Kremenets, Brody with the forces of the 24th Rifle Corps. On the very first day, in the area of the 27th Rifle Corps, the 25th Tank and 1st Guards Cavalry Corps were brought into battle, and on 16 March the 6th Guards Cavalry Corps joined the action as well. The Soviet troops crossed the Ikva river and rushed into the depths of the German defense, bypassing the strong Dubno stronghold from the north and south. The German 13th Army Corps fiercely resisted the Soviet troops on the approaches to Dubno. The Soviet formations bypassed Dubno from the north, thereby threatening the rear of the German troops. At the same time, units of the Soviet 172nd Infantry Division and the 149th Infantry Division broke into the outskirts of the city from the east. Under the onslaught of the Soviet troops, the German 13th Army Corps, fearing encirclement, began to hastily retreat. On 17 March, the Soviet units had captured the city of Dubno – an important strongpoint of the Germans in the Lviv direction.

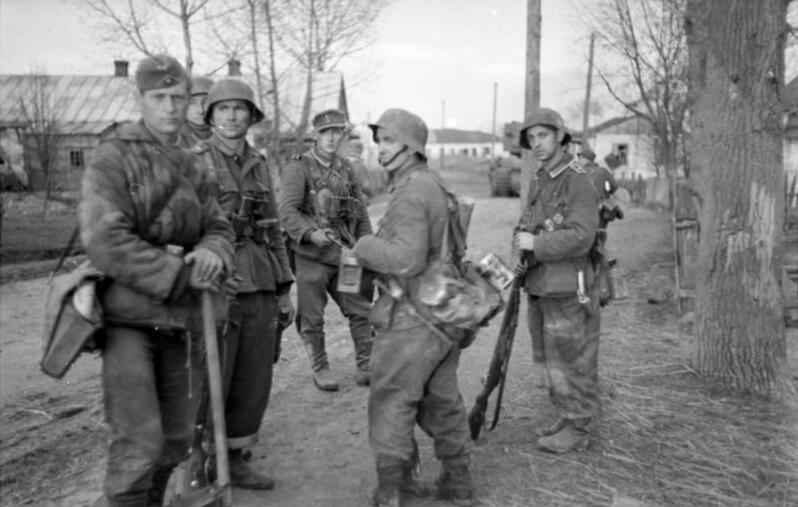
A group of German soldiers in a Ukrainian village, March 1944

Around the same time that the battle of Dubno took place, the troops of the Soviet 24th Rifle Corps reached the approaches to the city of Kremenets, located on the Kremenets Mountains. Numerous bunker trenches, machine-gun emplacements, as well as other engineering structures turned Kremenets into a stronghold, where the Germans intended to stubbornly resist. The Soviet 350th Infantry Division bypassed Kremenets, cutting off roads leading to the city from the south, while the 107th Infantry Division bypassed the city from the north. At the same time, the units of the 287th Rifle Division attacked the city from the front. Acting in small groups, the Soviet troops infiltrated the German positions. On 19 March, the Soviet troops liberated Kremenets, defeating the German garrison defending it.

After the liberation of Dubno and Kremenets, the troops of the Soviet 13th Army continued to develop the offensive to the west and south-west, and by 20 March had reached the outskirts of Brody. Fierce battle broke out here with varying success. The Germans reinforced the 13th Army Corps with the 361st Infantry Division, which arrived from OKH reserve in Denmark. On 17 March, this division approached the Brody area, where it occupied the prepared lines of defense. The Korpsabteilung C, which included battle groups of three infantry divisions, also reinforced this sector. Eventually, the Germans managed to keep Brody in their hands and they stopped the advance of Soviet troops on the outskirts of it. Both the 13th Army Corps and the Korpsabteilung C would eventually be completely destroyed in the Brody Pocket during the Soviet July 1944 Lvov–Sandomierz operation.

In general, the troops of the Soviet 13th Army, advancing on a front of about 120 km, advanced 20–80 km in five days and captured the major strongholds of the Germans- Dubno, Kremenets, Chervonoarmeysk, Torchin, Berestechko and others. They not only tied down the German 13th Army Corps (up to 6 divisions, of which 1 was a panzer division) and covered the right flank of the front attack force, but also absorbed one German infantry division that came from the OKH reserve, which eased the offensive of the 60th Army.

Meanwhile, on the left wing of the 1st Ukrainian Front, the troops of the 18th and 38th Armies persistently moved forward, taking one stronghold and large settlement after another. The troops of the 18th Army on 10 March had captured the town of Khmilnyk and developed the offensive in the direction of Dunaivtsi. Meanwhile, the 38th Army had to cross the Southern Bug river and seize such powerful centers of German resistance as Vinnytsia, Zhmerynka, and others.

On 16 March, units of the Soviet 151st Rifle Division of the 38th Army reached the approaches to Zhmerynka, turned by the Germans into a powerful center of resistance. To the north and south of the city, the 100th and 237th Rifle Divisions of the 67th Rifle Corps were advancing. Approaches to the city were mined by the Germans who created numerous strong-points with machine-gun emplacements. On the night before the attack, the Soviet sappers made passages in the minefields under heavy fire after reconnoitering the location of them. Along these aisles, at dawn, the Soviet infantry broke into Zhmerynka from the east. At the same time, other parts bypassed the city, striking at the German garrison from the flank and rear. By 18 March, Zhmerynka was completely liberated.

With the liberation of Zhmerynka, the Soviet troops began closing in on Vinnytsia, which was a place where the headquarters of Erich von Manstein's Army Group South was located. Parts of the Soviet 183rd Infantry Division advanced on Vinnitsa from the east with great difficulty through the impassable mud, while facing heavy German resistance. Having broken the resistance of the Germans at the railway embankment, the Soviet units infiltrated into the eastern part of the city in small groups and as a result of stubborn fighting by noon on 17 March they knocked the Germans out of it. The Germans, defeated in the eastern part of the city, retreated to the Southern Bug river. Hoping to stay in the western part of the city, the Germans blew up the river crossings across the Southern Bug and prepared for stubborn defense.

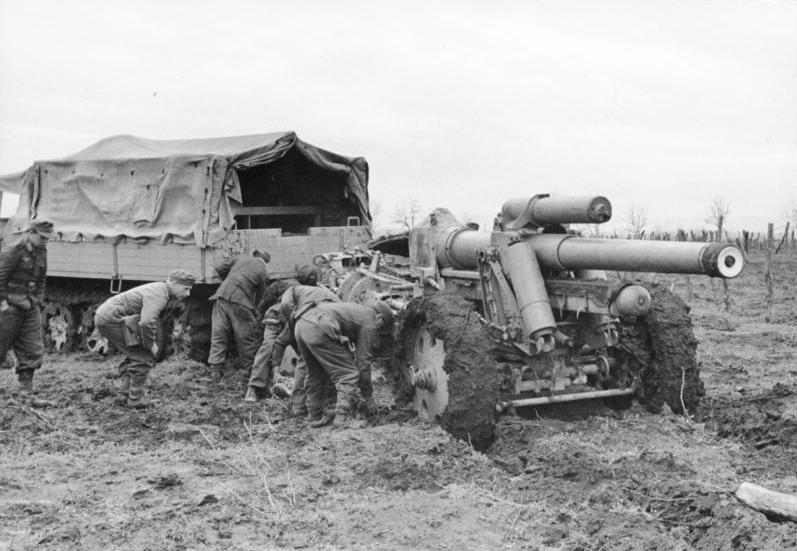
Raupenschlepper Ost prime mover attempts to tow a 150-mm heavy field howitzer sFH 18 in conditions of rasputitsa, March 1944. At least 220 of them will be lost in the pocket.

The commander of the 38th Army, Colonel-General Kirill Moskalenko, ordered to cross the Southern Bug river north and south of Vinnytsia, and then ordered to attack the flanks of the German forces that defended the city. At dawn on 17 March, the Germans attempted to push back the Soviet units from the river, but it was too late- the Soviets already had two battalions on the western bank of the river. Artillery and mortars were also transported there. When German forces attempted to eradicate the Soviet bridgehead, they were met by Soviet fire from all types of weapons.

Having repelled the German counterattack, units of the Soviet 305th Rifle Division, supported by artillery fire, began to advance and soon reached the Lukashevka area (20 km west of Vinnytsia), cutting off the Vinnitsa–Khmelnytskyi highway. Meanwhile, units of the 221st Rifle Division crossed the Southern Bug south of Vinnitsa and captured the village of Shkurintsy (12 km south-west of Vinnitsa). Now, the German forces defending Vinnitsa faced the threat of encirclement from both flanks, but continued to resist stubbornly. Then, the Soviet 183rd Infantry Division and the 241st Infantry Division increased the pressure on the Germans.

On 19 March, the battalion of the Soviet 183rd Infantry Division crossed the Southern Bug directly into Vinnitsa itself and occupied the suburb of Sadki. As a result of intense fighting in the morning of 20 March, the Soviet troops had completely liberated Vinnitsa. After the liberation of Zhmerynka and Vinnytsia, the troops of the Soviet 38th and 18th armies developed an offensive to the west and south-west, pushing the German 1st Panzer Army back to the Dniester river.

== 2nd phase of the operation. 21 March – 17 April 1944 ==
As of 21 March, 4th Panzer Army was deployed around Dubno, while 1st Panzer Army under Hans-Valentin Hube was further south, to the west of Vinnitsa.

On 21 March, the main strike force of the 1st Ukrainian Front (under Zhukov) resumed the attack against the right flank of 4th Panzer, striking from the line of Volochysk, Cherny Ostrov towards Chortkiv and Chernovtsi. 60th and 1st Guards Armies, with the assistance of the 4th Tank Army, 1st Tank Army, and 3rd Guards Tank Army, shattered German defenses on the very first day. With a swift blow the Soviets tore open the front of 4th Panzer and began to advance rapidly southwards.

=== Katukov's tank army moves south beyond Dniester River ===
The STAVKA deeming it necessary to deny the 1st Panzer Army any chance of retreat south behind the Dniester River, 1st Tank Army, led by Katukov, was ordered to advance beyond the Dniester, deep into the German rear areas.

The advance of the freshly introduced 1st Tank Army was particularly successful. In the morning of 23 March, 1st Tank captured the important communication center of Chortkiv and at 10 AM on 24 March its 8th Guards Mechanized Corps reached the Dniester. In the Zalishchyky district, 20th Guards Mechanized Brigade (Colonel Babadzhanian) approached the Dniester, and in the Stechko District (20 km north-west of Zalishchyky), 1st Guards Tank Brigade (Colonel Gorelov) and 21st Guards Mechanised Brigade (Colonel Yakovlev) approached the Dniester as well. To the left of those forces, 11th Guards Tank Corps (Lieutenant General Getman) reached the Dniester and crossed it on the march. Behind the mechanized and tank corps, 11th Rifle Corps (Major General Zamertsev) moved forward.

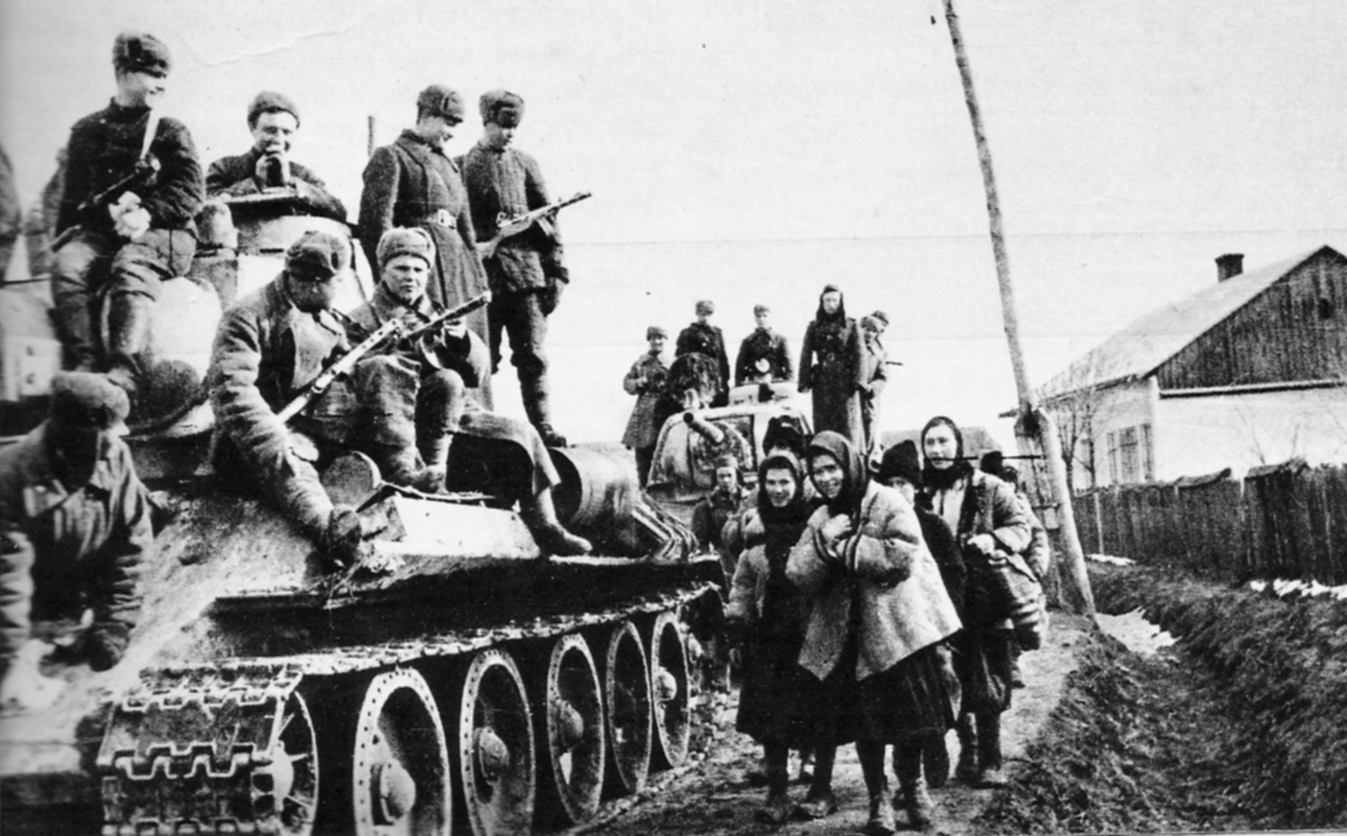
T-34 tanks, with tank riders on them, in a Ukrainian village, spring 1944

The sky above the Dniester was blazing with rockets, flashes of shots, exploding shells, and aerial bombs. On the muddy roads, through deep gullies and ravines to the south and southwest, the Soviet forces moved swiftly. Despite the deep spring mud and fierce resistance, the Germans were unable to stop the advance of the Soviet troops.

Among the first to cross the Dniester was 64th Guards Separate Heavy Tank Brigade (Lieutenant Colonel Boyko) of 1st Tank Army. Quickly, the unit crossed the land between the Dniester and Prut rivers and by 11 PM on 25 March had seized the railway station at Moshi, coming from the north to the approaches of Chernovtsy. When the Red Army reached the station, the train with German tanks was unloaded in a hurry. The sudden appearance of Soviet tanks caused confusion among the Germans. With a few shots, the Soviet tank crews set fire to the German ammunition wagons, which further exacerbated the panic. Then the Soviet tankers struck a decisive blow, and the railway station was soon cleared.

Bridges on the Prut, which led to Chernovtsy, were mined and defended by a strong group of German forces. The attempts of Soviet tank crews to seize the bridges were unsuccessful. The Soviets organized a reconnaissance in force across the river. At 5 PM on 28 March, 64th Guards Tank Brigade began to cross the Prut in the Kalanchak area (5 km east of Chernovtsy) to strike at Chernovtsy from the east. At the same time, 45th Guards Tank Brigade and 24th Infantry Division began to cross the river in the area of Lenkovtsy (2 km north-west of Chernovtsy), bypassing Chernovtsy from the west.

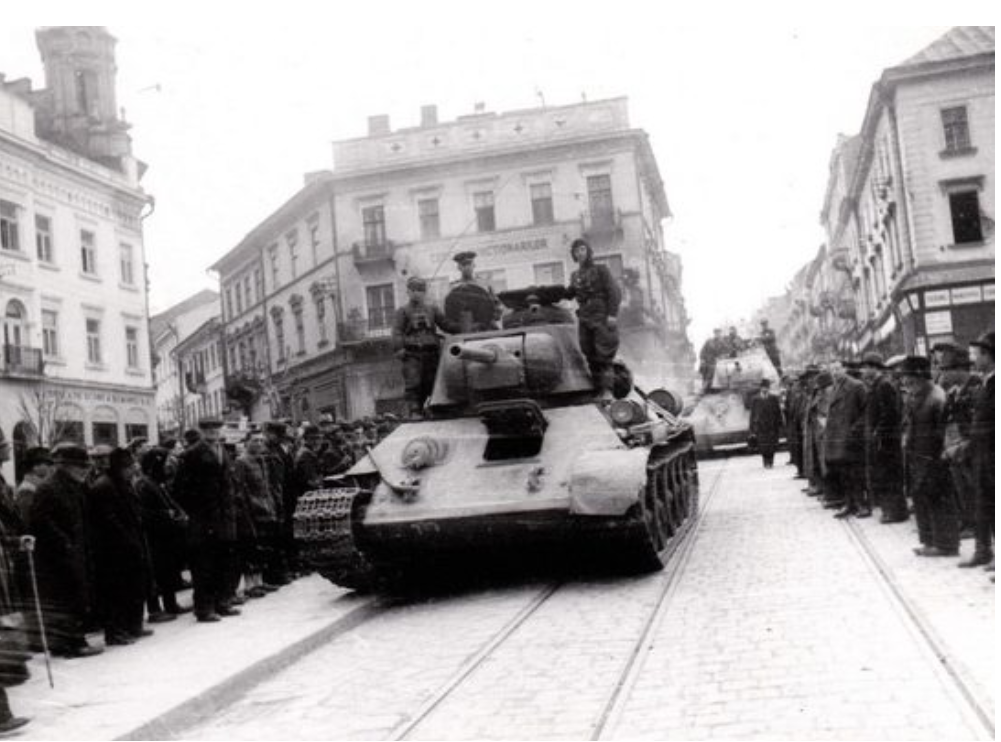
Red Army enters Chernovtsy (now Chernivtsi), end of March 1944

In an effort to at least temporarily delay the advance of the Soviet troops, the German command decided to use aircraft. At Chernovtsy airfield, about 40 German planes were preparing to take off. However, the Soviet tanks unexpectedly broke through to the airfield and no aircraft could take off. The last attempt of the Germans to resist the Soviet troops crossing the Prut was thwarted.

Meanwhile, other parts of 1st Tank Army bypassed Chernovtsy from the west, cutting off the German escape route to Storozhynets. The Germans, operating in the Chernovtsy region, were under the threat of encirclement. To avoid that, the Germans began a hasty retreat, which turned into a costly process. During the retreat, they were attacked by the Ilyushin Il-2 Sturmoviks of the 227th Assault Aviation Division of Colonel Lozhechnikov.

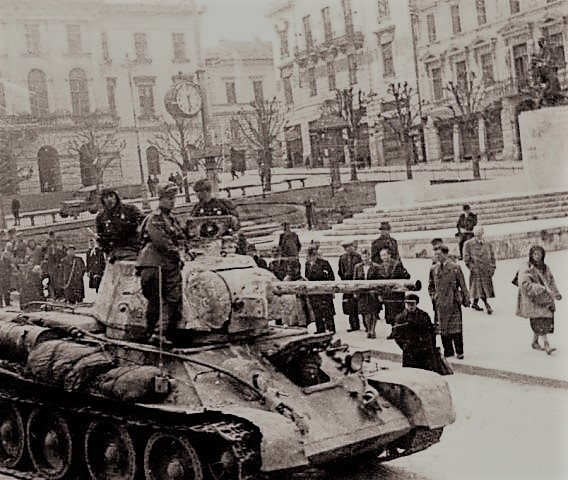
Soviet tanks and troops in the center of Chernovtsy, 29 March 1944

At noon on 29 March, Chernovtsy was completely cleared of German forces. Similarly, on 28 March, units of 1st Guards Tank Brigade cleared the German forces from around Kolomyia. To attack the Germans in the city, an advanced detachment was assigned of seven T-34 tanks with tank riders on them. At dawn on 28 March, the advanced detachment attacked the city from the northeast, and a platoon of tanks attacked the city from the northwest. German resistance was broken. Soviet units broke into Kolomyia and by 9 AM had completely cleared it. In the city and at the station, the Soviets captured large trophies: more than a dozen serviceable tanks, 13 trains, several steam locomotives, 400 cars, and 10 different warehouses.

After the capture of Chernovtsy and Kolomyia, 1st Tank Army continued active operations in the direction of Ivano-Frankivsk and Nadvirna. After defeating the Germans in the foothills of the Carpathians, on 8 April, army units reached the Soviet border at a front of over 200 km.

All told, in the course of two weeks, 1st Tank Army successfully advanced over 170 km through the spring mud and numerous water barriers, like the Dniester river. 1st Tank was highly successfully in advancing beyond the Dniester, forcing the Germans to abandon one major city after another. However, this also meant that 1st Tank was effectively excluded from the effort to split and destroy 1st Panzer Army around Kamianets-Podilskyi.

For its accomplishments during this operation, 1st Tank Army was awarded the status of 1st "Guards" Tank Army.

=== The encirclement of 1st Panzer Army ===
The troops of the 1st Guards Army, regrouping their main forces on the right flank, together with units of the 3rd Guards Tank Army, struck north-west of Proskurov. On 22 March, the German resistance was broken and Soviet troops deeply enveloped the Germans at Proskurov from the west.

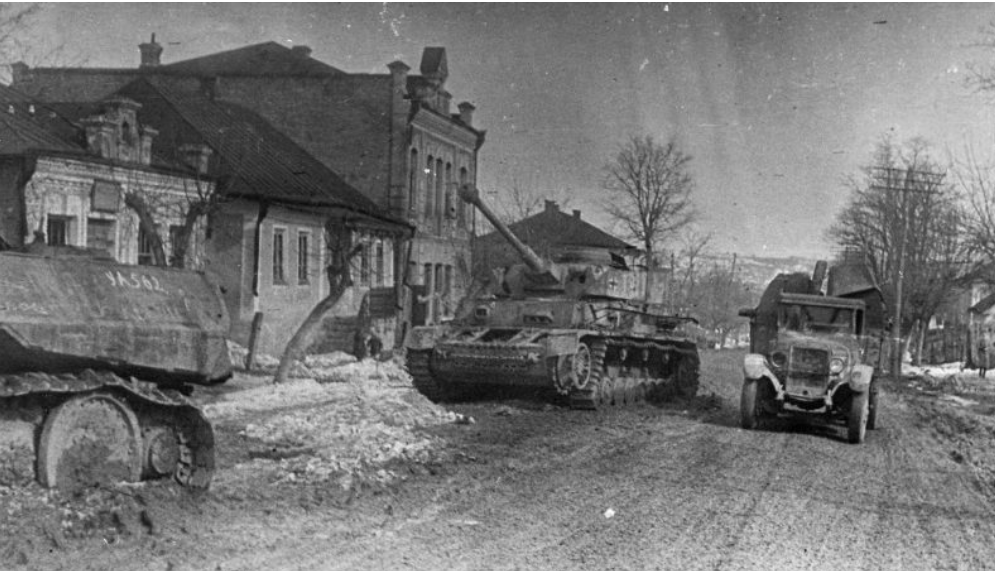
Soviet ZIS-5 truck passes by the abandoned Panzer IV on the streets of Proskurov, March 1944.

At the same time, 107th Rifle Corps of 1st Guards Army attacked Proskurov from the north and northeast. On 25 March, Proskurov was cleared of German forces by units of 127th Infantry Division, 304th Infantry Division, and 2nd Guards Airborne Division. 4th Tank Army, which was developing the success of the breakthrough from the Volochysk region to the south, was also successful. On 26 March, this tank army broke into Kamianets-Podilskyi and freed it from the Germans.

After the capture of Proskurov, 1st Guards Army continued the offensive in a southwestern direction, using the success of 1st and 4th Tank Armies, to quickly reach the Kamenets-Podolsky area and block the retreat of 1st Panzer Army. 3rd Guards Tank Army was then withdrawn to the front reserve on March 28. By the end of 30 March, 1st Guards Army reached the region of Chemerovtsy.

Thus, with a powerful strike from Volochyskto to the south and south-west, 1st Ukrainian Front tore a huge gap in the German defense and had split the front of Army Group South into two parts. 4th Panzer Army was driven back to the west and part of it was surrounded on 24 March in Tarnopol, which was declared to be a fortress (Festung). 1st Panzer Army was enveloped from the south-west by 4th Tank Army.

By this point, several major re-groupings took place. 11th Rifle Corps (three divisions) of 1st Guards Army was reassigned to Katukov's 1st Tank Army and acted together with it in the foothills of the Carpathians. On 27 March, 30th Rifle Corps (two divisions) was also subordinated to 4th Tank Army and operated in the Kamenets-Podolsky area. But 1st Guards Army was given another corps, 18th Guards Rifle Corps (two divisions), which was transferred to it from 60th Army on 22 March and was at that time 100 km from the main army forces. The decision of front commander Zhukov to transfer 18th Guards Rifle Corps from 60th Army (with which it formed a common external front) to 1st Guards Army, from which it was separated, was a miscalculation that played a negative role in the subsequent attempt to destroy 1st Panzer Army.

At this time, Marshal Konev's 2nd Ukrainian Front, having struck from Zvenyhorodka to Uman, launched the neighboring Uman–Botoshany operation. They broke through the German defenses, split the German front in fierce battles and rushed to the Dniester, deeply enveloping the right flank of 1st Panzer Army. 40th Army, advancing on the right wing of the front, on 21 March advanced to the Dniester north-east of Mogilev-Podolsky with advanced units, and then, having sent the main forces to the opposite bank of the river, began to develop an offensive in the general direction of Khotyn.

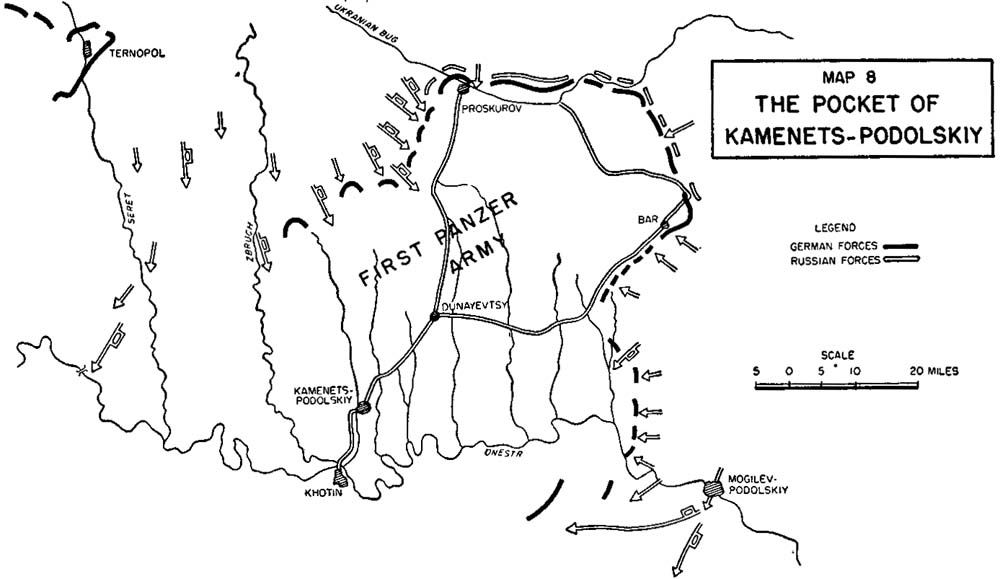
Soviet advances leading to the creation of the pocket.

Thus by coordinated action, 1st and 2nd Ukrainian Fronts had by 30 March encircled the entire 1st Panzer Army, numbering approximately 200,000 troops (10 infantry, 9 panzer and panzer-grenadier, and 1 artillery divisions, as well as various tank, artillery, and engineering units) in the area of Chemerivtsi, Dunaivtsi, Studenitsa, and Kamianets-Podilskyi. The perimeter of the German forces surrounded in this area was about 150 km.

While the encircled forces had food and ammunition enough to support them for over two weeks, the vehicles were extremely low on fuel. Hube had ordered all service units south of the Dniester to withdraw from the main Soviet penetration to the south by 40th Army. Zhukov believed Hube would attempt to break out to the south. To prevent this, he stripped units from the encircling forces and sent them to reinforce the south side of the pocket.

=== Hube organizes move west ===
Hube now ordered the pocket to be reduced in size, shortening the position's lines to increase defence density. As 1st Ukrainian Front prepared to complete the encirclement, Hube requested authorization to use mobile defence tactics, a request which was quickly denied. However, once the encirclement was complete, the situation changed. Manstein had been arguing with Hitler for the trapped Army to be allowed to attempt a break-out, and for a relief force to be sent to assist them. With the loss of the entire Panzer Army in the balance, Hitler finally gave in and ordered Hube to attempt a break-out.

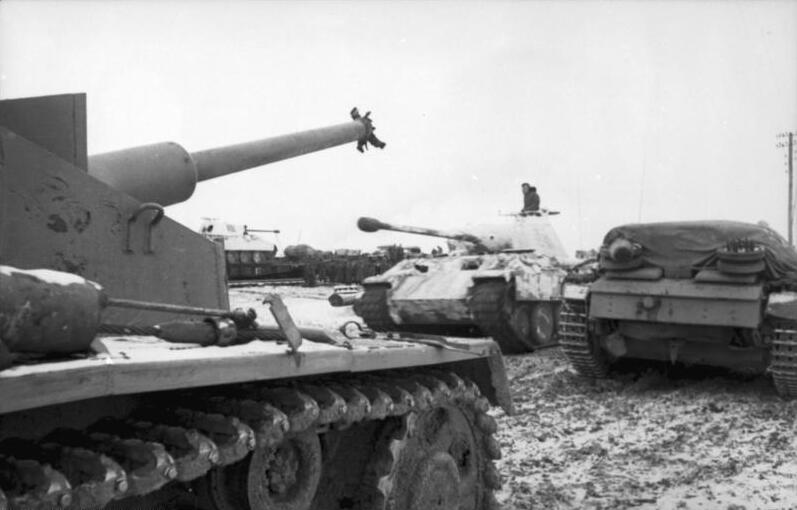
A Panther passes a damaged StuG III as it moves off the rail head, March 1944

Though supplies were still being brought in, they were insufficient to maintain the Army's fighting strength.

Moving west would mean fighting through the Soviet armoured forces that created the breach and crossing a number of rivers. Hube preferred to head south, over the Dniester. Manstein believed that this is what the Soviet command expected, and would be the most heavily resisted line of escape. Also, such a move would push the 1st Panzer Army into Romania, making defending the southern Ukraine sector quite difficult. The Hungarian VII Corps was holding a sector of the front to the west of the Kamianets-Podilskyi pocket. Manstein ordered Hube to break out to this area.

The threat of panic among his troops within the pocket was a grave concern. As a means of maintaining control and simplifying the chain of command, Hube consolidated his forces into provisional corps groups. Each corps group, within its zone, was to be responsible for both the conduct of the attack to the west and the rear guard action in the east. The armored divisions of each corps group were to spearhead the army's attack, while the infantry divisions covered the rear. Two columns would fight their way west. The northern column was Korpsgruppe von der Chevallerie under command of Kurt von der Chevallerie and the south column was Korpsgruppe Breith under command of General Hermann Breith. A third corps under command of General Hans Gollnick of the XLVI Panzer Corps formed Korpsgruppe Gollnick.

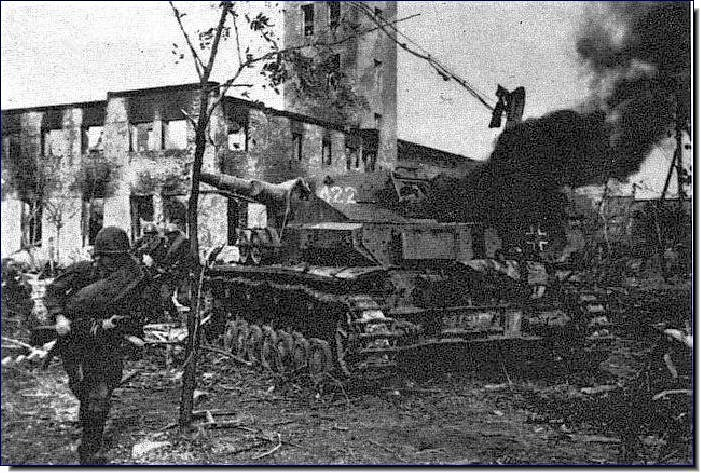
Soviet soldier pass a destroyed Panzer IV in Tarnopol

The first objective of the breakout was to be the capture of crossing sites over the Zbruch River. Corps Group Chevallerie was to establish contact with the 1st Panzer Division at Gorodok and Task Force Mauss in the area between the Ushitsa and Zbruch rivers. It was then to cover the northern flank of the army between the Ushitsa and Zbruch and establish a bridgehead across the latter at Skala. Corps Group Breith was to recapture Kamianets-Podilskyi, regain control of the Kamianets–Khotyn road, and establish a bridgehead across the Zbruch River northwest of Khotin. Task Force Gollnick, in close contact with the south flank of Corps Group Breith, was to delay the Soviets below the Dniester and then retire to and hold a bridgehead at Khotin.

1st Panzer was to break out northwest toward Tarnopol, where relief forces from Paul Hausser's II SS Panzer Corps were to meet them. Air Supply Arrangements were made with the German Fourth Air Fleet to assemble five air transport groups and a number of bomber wings at L'vev in Poland to fly essential supplies into the pocket. From Kamianets-Podilskyi to Tarnopol was a distance of over 250 km (160 mi), over several rivers, and across muddy terrain. In addition, he believed the Soviets would act as they had at Stalingrad, and make their strongest resistance along this line.

=== Weakness of the Soviet encirclement front ===
Although the Soviets now had encircled 1st Panzer Army, there were weaknesses in the Soviet encirclement front. In the western direction, between the right flank of 1st Guards Army in the region of Chemerovtsy, and the left flank of 4th Tank Army in the Lyantskoruni region, there was a gap of up to 15 km. 4th Tank Army, which formed the south-western part of the encirclement front, suffered significant losses and had just 60 operational tanks left. 30th Rifle Corps (two divisions), transferred to 4th Tank Army from the 1st Guards Army for reinforcement, had very little artillery and, moreover, had to be deployed at the line indicated to it already in the course of repelling strong German attacks. 4th Tank Army and 30th Rifle Corps experienced an acute shortage of ammunition and fuel, which were delivered only by air.

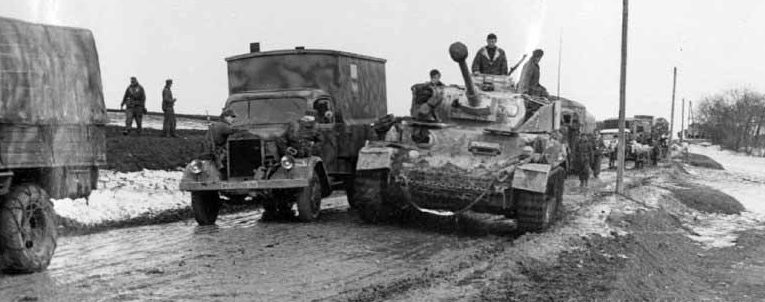
1st Panzer Army column on the move, spring 1944. The area is mixed up with snow and mud, as the weather frequently altered between heavy thaw and sudden snowstorms.

Thus, although the Soviet troops managed to cut off large amount of German forces and push them back into a relatively small area north of Kamianets-Podilskyi, the conditions for the destruction of the German troops were not created. Both the internal and the external fronts were vulnerable and in the most important places. Soviet troops, operating on the inner front, somewhat outnumbered 1st Panzer Army but did not have enough artillery, especially tanks. The combined-arms armies, which advanced through difficult terrain and had great difficulty in towing their artillery through the deep spring mud, did not possess sufficient striking force for decisive actions to dismember the German grouping, which had a large number of panzer divisions. 4th Tank Army, significantly weakened and experiencing great difficulties in ammunition and fuel supplies, barely repulsed the German attacks.

For the destruction of 1st Panzer Army, 1st Tank Army could be used, but it had moved far ahead and acted on a broad front south of the Dniester in the foothills of the Carpathians. Furthermore, the Soviets also transferred part of the rifle divisions across the Dniester as well, to assist 1st Tank Army in the rout of German forces from Chernovtsy, near the Soviet border. As a result, the Soviet forces could have inflicted a decisive strike against 1st Panzer were effectively excluded from the attempts to destroy it, pursuing a different operational goal: to prevent 1st Panzer Army from retreating south of the Dniester river, which was achieved.

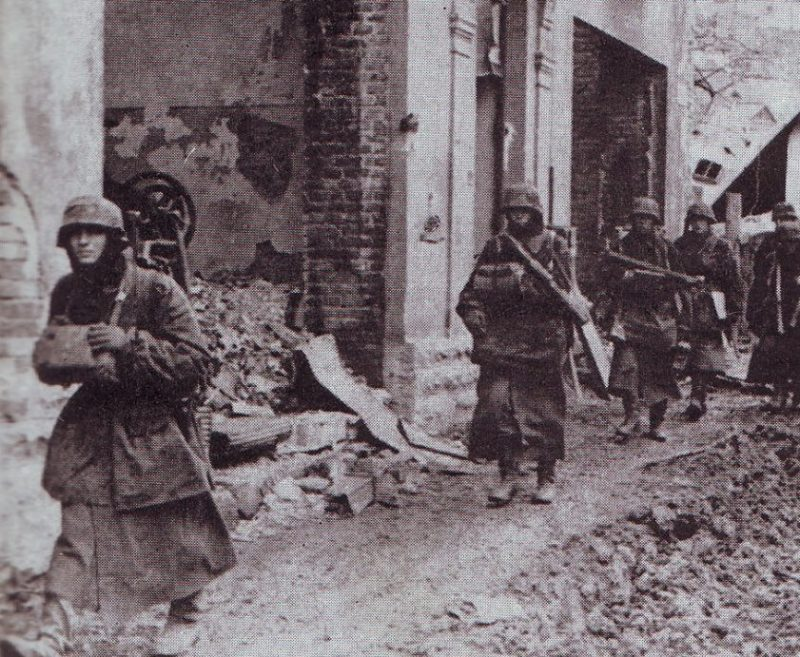
German soldiers on the streets of Kamenets-Podolsky, March 1944

Under these circumstances, the Soviet front command decided to intercept 1st Panzer's withdrawal paths and destroy it with blows from all sides. However, the front command did not accurately determine the direction of the breakthrough of the Germans. At first, it believed that 1st Panzer would make its way south through the Dniester, to Romania. This assumption was based on some intelligence data.

1st Ukrainian Front command, which believed that the enemy would retreat south, directed the main efforts of the troops in late March to cut off the Germans from the crossings on the Dniester and capture them. Persistent German attacks in the western direction and the fact that 4th Tank Army held back attacks with great difficulty were seen as the German desire to "seep out" to Dniester crossings near Zalishchyky.

=== Breakout ===
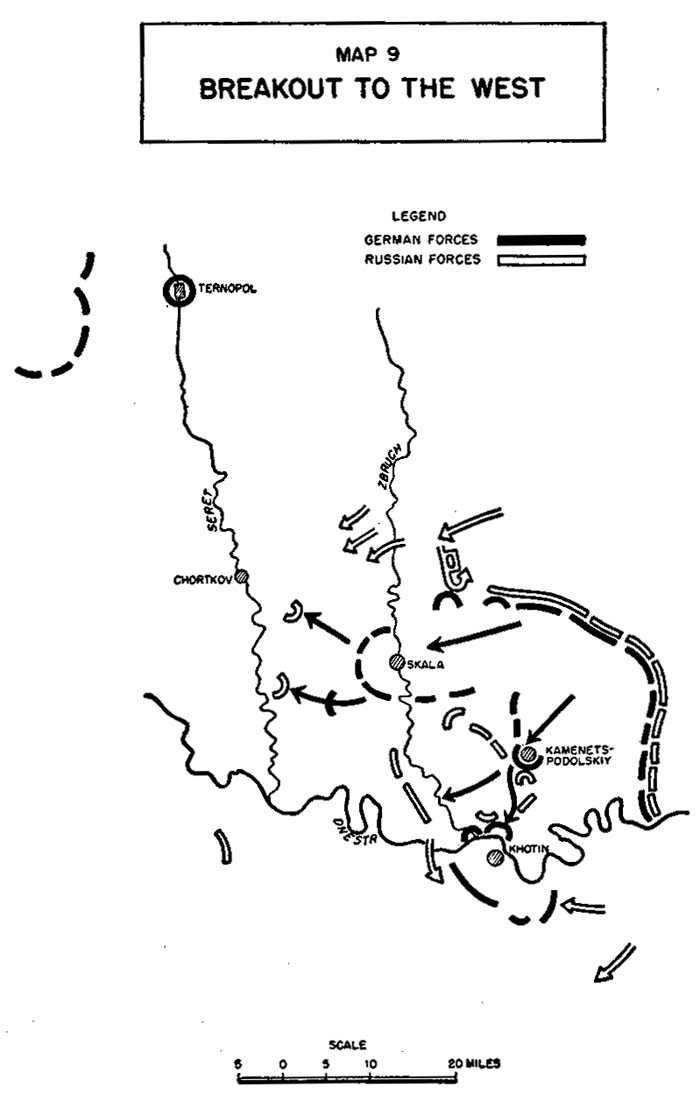
German breakout to the west.

On 27 March, the advance guard of 1st Panzer Army moved west toward the Zbruch River, while the rear guard began a fighting withdrawal, with the rest of the 220,000 men between them. The advanced guard attack went well for the German forces. The northern column quickly captured three bridges over the Zbruch, while the southern column was battered by a 4th Tank Army counterattack which penetrated deep into the pocket, capturing Kamianets-Podilskyi. The loss of this major road and rail hub meant that the escaping Germans had to detour around the city, slowing the movement to a crawl. A counterattack soon cut off the Soviets in the city, and the breakout recommenced. Moving by day and night, the kessel kept moving. Soon bridgeheads were formed over the Seret river.

While Hube's army escaped west, Zhukov and Konev continued to believe that the major breakout attempt would be to the south. Zhukov ordered attacks on the northern and eastern flanks of the pocket stepped up. These attacks achieved little, and many fell on positions which had been abandoned as the German troops withdrew to Proskurov. Despite the attacks to the west, Soviet commanders kept increasing troop density south of the pocket in anticipation of an attack that would never come.

On 30 March, Manstein was informed by the OKH that he had been relieved of command.

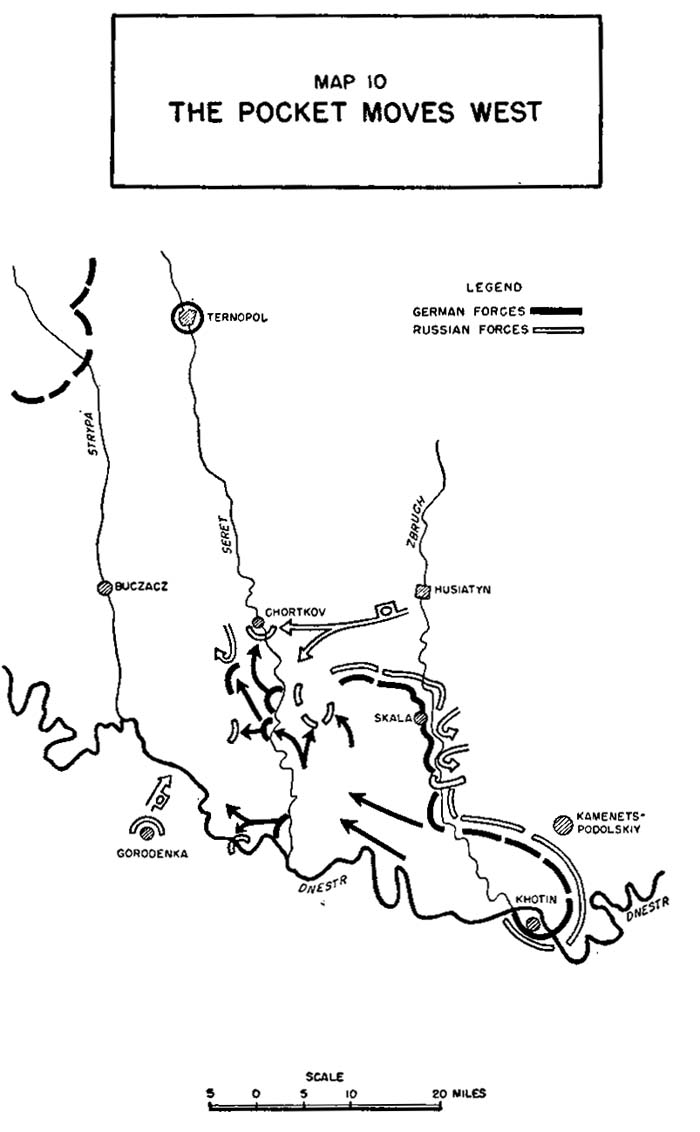
Soviet response to the breakout.

The next day, the Soviets began to react. A strong armored force from 4th Tank Army launched an assault in the north between the Seret and Zbruch. Hube's southern advanced guard turned and halted the Soviet assault, severing supply lines and rendering the T-34s immobile. Despite the fact that he was now taking the breakout attempt seriously, Zhukov did not move to block the escaping Germans. The way to Tarnopol was still open.

=== Completing the breakout ===
Despite heavy snowfalls, low supplies, and encirclement, the troops of Hube's army were still moving in good order and obeying discipline, while desertions were few. This was a stark comparison to the panicked situation within the Stalingrad and Korsun encirclements.

By 5 April, the advanced guards of both the northern and southern columns had reached the Strypa River, and on the 6th, near the town of Buchach, they linked up with the probing reconnaissance elements of Hausser's SS Divisions.

In over two weeks of heavy combat and during horrid weather, the majority of 1st Panzer Army had managed to escape the encirclement at the cost of losing almost all of its heavy equipment, with only 45 armored vehicles escaping, while many divisions were shattered formations. As a result, 1st Panzer Army required thorough refitting.

The Army was put back into the line and established itself between the Dniester and the town of Brody.

== Condition of the 1st Panzer Army after the breakout ==
At the time of the breakout and after it, the 1st Panzer Army emerged from the encirclement with greatly reduced combat power, in terms of both personnel and materiel, with all of its divisions afterwards being considered fit for limited defensive operations only or were no longer operational, as reported by army’s management department (Führungsabteilung), as well as subordinated corps’ and divisions.

At 14:50 on 5 April, one day before establishing first tenuous contact with the forward elements of Hausser’s II SS Panzer Corps that arrived from France, the 1st Panzer Army High Command reported the following condition of its divisions:

Due to their material and personnel condition, the following divisions are certainly no longer operational: 1st, 68th, 75th, 82nd, 96th, 254th, 291st Infantry Divisions, 18th Artillery Division, Combat Groups [Kampfgruppen] of the [1st SS Panzer Division] LSSAH, SS-Reich, 11th Panzer Division. The other divisions are also only operational to a very limited extent due to the loss of heavy weapons, artillery, motor vehicles and large parts of their supply facilities, as well as low combat strengths [Gefechtsstärken] and a severe reduction in the overall strength of formations, and are in urgent need of rest and refitting before taking on new decisive tasks. The condition of the divisions will be reported in detail later.

The breakdown of the material and personnel condition of the 1st Panzer Army after the breakout is given below.

=== Material condition ===
The material losses were extremely high, with most of the armoured vehicles, motor vehicles, artillery and anti-tank guns, as well as various equipment of the rear services, being lost, mainly through abandonment in the spring mud. After the breakout, the formations of the army retained only a small number of their vehicles, weaponry and equipment. This meant that the 1st Panzer Army would continue to be hamstrung by major material deficiencies, especially in motor vehicles, all the way to early June 1944.

There were numerous reasons for such losses. As the Red Army penetrated deep into the rear areas of the 1st Panzer Army, the threat of complete encirclement loomed for the German forces. For this reason, the Germans were forced to conduct hurried retreats, which often turned into chaotic flight, in order to prevent the consolidation of the Soviet encirclement ring. However, the combination of the deep spring mud, which slowed the movements to a crawl, chronic shortages of prime movers, lack of spare parts, fuel shortages, as well as limited rail net, had made it impossible to evacuate large number of heavy weaponry, vehicles and non-operational equipment in a timely manner. Furthermore, cannibalizing the damaged tanks to repair others was frequent, while draining of fuel the vehicles that did not have all-wheel drive, necessary to overcome the mud, was typical. In addition to the aerial re-supply, this became one of the means of saving fuel during the breakthrough. The vehicles deemed non-essential were then usually forced off the road and set ablaze, typified by the case of the 1st Panzer Division at the Zbruch river.

Regarding the destruction of vehicles deemed not essential, the commander of the 1st Panzer Army General Hube gave the following order on 24 March 1944, when the army was cut off:

I demand that all vehicles, which are not vital and that cannot continue to keep up easily, be immediately ruthlessly destroyed in order to preserve fuel. They will be lost anyway!
Even more Panje-wagons [horse-drawn], but only for the most necessary combat needs (radio stations, ammunition, heavy infantry weapons and transportation of the wounded), must be organized. Everything else is ballast and hinders success. Combine stragglers into units and assign them to the combat formations.

The selection of the vehicles to be destroyed was controlled strictly from above, which tried not to allow this process to be given a free hand. The procedure to destroy selective vehicles was typified by the case of the 16th Panzer Division, which reported the following course of action:

Groups of [army] staff officers checked the fulfillment of the order and without talks blew up any vehicle they considered superfluous. Not a drop of fuel was to be lost if the breakthrough to the west was to succeed.

In addition, the deep thrust of the Red Army had also cut off the 1st Panzer Army in a large operational area, in which there were numerous rear-service workshops, where hundreds of non-operational German armoured vehicles were in various stages of repair, especially after the attempt to relieve the Korsun Pocket the previous month.

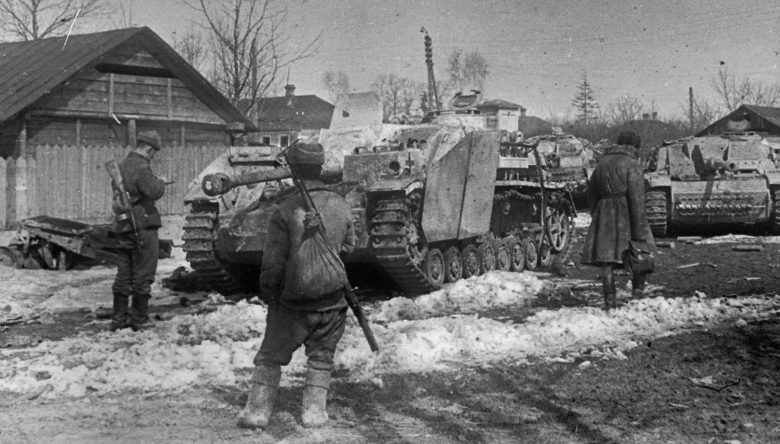
Soviet soldiers inspect German assault guns, captured near Proskurov, end of March 1944. StuG IV is in the foreground, StuG III in the background.

The result of all this was that enormous number of vehicles, weaponry and equipment of all sorts was lost, mainly through abandonment in the mud.

Between 12–19 April 1944, an investigation was made by a group of motor vehicle officers of the Generalquartiermeister branch, subordinated to the German Army General Staff (Generalstab des Heeres), about the total irrecoverable material losses of the 1st Panzer Army units in the Kamenets-Podolsky ‘cauldron’ (Kessel), in cooperation with the Oberquartiermeister department of the 1st Panzer Army. This included the total irrecoverable losses (called Totalausfälle) of motor vehicles, armoured vehicles, as well as various specialized repair vehicles. This investigation would not be complete until 25 April 1944. The units of the 1st Panzer Army under investigation included the 1st, 6th, 7th, 16th, 17th and 19th Panzer Divisions, 20th Panzergrenadier Division, 1st, 75th, 82nd, 96th, 168th, 208th, 291st and 371st Infantry Divisions, 101st Jäger Division, 300th and 301st StuG Brigades, 88th Heavy Tank Destroyer Battalion, as well as various small General Headquarters (GHQ) combat units of the III, XXIV, XXXXVI Panzer Corps’ and LIX Army Corps. The list is largely complete, but there are several units that are missing from it.

Most notably, the 1st SS Panzer Division LSSAH is not included in this list. It was encircled as part of the 1st Panzer Army. On 27 March 1944, the worn-out LSSAH received orders to move to the OB West area in Belgium for rebuilding, when the situation would allow it. However, since it was trapped with the 1st Panzer Army in the East at the time, the movement was delayed until mid-April 1944- the withdrawal of the remaining personnel and equipment of combat-ineffective LSSAH to the Beverloo training area in Belgium would not be complete until 19 April 1944. For this reason, as well as due to mixing of divisions (attaching parts of it to another), it was not possible to keep exact track of LSSAH’s numbers, even though its material losses were also very high, as it arrived to Belgium with just a fraction of the equipment that it was supposed to have. The data on LSSAH’s material situation is given separately.

The table below gives the losses of motor vehicles of all types, based on classifications, sustained by all of the units listed above, except for the 1st SS Panzer Division LSSAH, which is listed separately.

Total irrecoverable losses of motor vehicles (by classification) in the pocket
Type	Total lost	Notes
Motorcycles	4,391	Both solo and with sidecar- BMW R75, Zündapp KS 750.
Half-track motorcycles	88	Sd.Kfz. 2
Trucks of all models	10,160	Mercedes-Benz L3000, Opel Blitz, Borgward B 3000, Renault AHx, Henschel 33 etc.
Maultier half-track trucks	884	
Passenger cars of all types (standard and cross-country) and weights (light, medium)	4,944	Kübelwagen, Schwimmwagen, Horch 901 (with its numerous variants) etc.
Raupenschlepper Ost (RSO) prime movers	220	
1 Ton prime movers	312	Sd.Kfz. 10- leichter Zugkraftwagen 1 t
3 Ton prime movers	141	Sd.Kfz. 11- leichter Zugkraftwagen 3 t
5 Ton prime movers	59	Sd.Kfz. 6- mittlerer Zugkraftwagen 5 t
8 Ton prime movers	138	Sd.Kfz. 7- mittlerer Zugkraftwagen 8 t
12 Ton prime movers	39	Sd.Kfz. 8- schwerer Zugkraftwagen 12 t
18 Ton prime movers	49	Sd.Kfz. 9- schwerer Zugkraftwagen 18 t
Buses (Kraftomnibusse) of all types (light, medium, heavy) and models	196	Büssing-NAG Typ 4500 T, Mercedes-Benz Typ Lo 3500, Lo 3750 & O 3750 (L 64), Opel-Blitz 2.5-ton 4x2 Typ 3.6-47 etc.
Motor vehicle trailers of all types (single-axle, double-axle) and purposes	338	Workshop trailers (Anh. 350- Anhänger, B 2, 3t, geschlossen), radio trailers (Ah. 470- Funkanhänger, Kurzwelle/Langwelle, 2 achs), trailers for disinfection (Sd. Ah. 11- Anhänger, 1 achs., für Entseuchung) etc.
Total	21,959	

As already mentioned, the losses of the 1st SS Panzer Division LSSAH are not given. Nonetheless, a comparison of its motor vehicle situation on 1 March 1944 (before the start of the Soviet offensive) and on 1 May 1944, when the refitting in Belgium was underway, provides a good indication of the scale of losses sustained by LSSAH.

LSSAH motor vehicle situation on 1 March 1944
Motor vehicle	Authorized	Operational	In repairs	Total available
Trucks	4,753	2,061	546	2,607
Passenger cars	1,808	462	330	792
Prime movers	389	78	72	150
Motorcycles	1,795	207	366	573

On 1 May 1944, when LSSAH was already in Belgium and the refitting was underway, the number of motor vehicles was just a fraction of what it was supposed to have.

LSSAH motor vehicle situation on 1 May 1944 (in brackets the shortfall in % compared to 1 March 1944)
Motor vehicle	Authorized	Total available (operational and in repairs)	Shortages
Trucks	3,851	1,590 (-39%)	2,261
Passenger cars	1,588	387 (-51%)	1,201
Prime movers	390	36 (-76%)	354
Motorcycles	1,793	174 (-70%)	1,619

The actual percentage of losses most likely was higher, since some workshops, where various motor vehicles of LSSAH were in repair, found themselves outside the pocket when the 1st Panzer Army was cut off. Already on 29 March 1944, it was ordered to transport those vehicles by rail to Belgium, hence some non-operational vehicles were evacuated. Whatever the precise number, it is clear that LSSAH sustained very heavy motor vehicle losses and by May 1944 it had just a fraction of vehicles that it was supposed to have, based on its 'authorized strength' (Sollstärke).

The destruction of a large number of vehicles, which ran out of fuel, had a depressing effect on the soldiers. SS-Sturmbannführer Otto Weidinger, one of the commanders in the regimental-sized SS-Kampfgruppe Das Reich in the pocket, described how vehicles of the unit were blown up on the night of 31 March- 1 April 1944, before crossing the Smotrich river:

On this night the fuel finally ran out for most of the vehicles and the commanding officer was forced to give the bitter order to blow up the bulk of the vehicles before crossing the Smotritsch. Only the most vital combat vehicles for weapons and ammunition were permitted to go on- insofar as the fuel situation permitted.
The vehicles, which were drawn up around the crossing site in a semicircle, were blown up with a heavy heart, and the blazing, widely-visible graveyard of the battle group’s vehicles was a sad and depressing sight. Each vehicle with the men’s few possessions had become to them a small piece of home. As a result of outstanding maintenance and the truly excellent work of the repair echelons, so far we had always succeeded in freeing vehicles which became frozen in, mired in mud or stuck in the snowdrifts; and now they had to be blown up, not because of mechanical defects or other technical problems, but because of a lack of fuel! Assets of tremendous valuable were destroyed in a very short time.

The huge metal graveyards on both sides of the road created major difficulties in movement. The war diary (Kriegstagebuch) of the Panzergrenadier-Regiment 1 of the 1st Panzer Division, entry for 30 March 1944 at 20.30, noted:

The division is gathering with all parts in the Ljanzkorun area as a corps reserve. The march road is lined on both sides by numerous broken down and destroyed motor vehicles. The march is proceeding very slowly. Everywhere extensive traffic jams must be cleared or bypassed.

On 2–3 April 1944, the III Panzer Corps, with the 17th Panzer Division as a spearhead, encountered major logistical difficulties while crossing the bridge across the Zhvanets river, due to harsh weather, major traffic jams and preference of the 17th Panzer Division to preserve its own vehicles at the expense of other corps units. This led to another huge metal graveyard of motor vehicles before the bridge crossing. The war diary of the Quartermaster Department of the III Panzer Corps, entry for 3 April 1944 at 13.50, noted:

There is a line of motor vehicles many kilometers long in front of the bridge. The bridge has an hourly capacity of only 30 motor vehicles, so that most of the motor vehicles cannot cross the bridge until the intended bridge demolition. Traffic control command of the 17th Panzer Division obviously favors its own motor vehicles and does not single out any division-owned vehicle, while the vehicles of other units are strictly checked and pulled out for destruction. Increased fuel consumption due to frost and snowstorm at night, as many drivers left their engines running, because otherwise starting problems would be the result.

To see how the 24 March 1944 order, to blow up any vehicles deemed not vital in order to preserve fuel, was implemented, General Hube personally made several inspections of various units of the III Panzer Corps on 1 April 1944. He noted that the order was still not strictly implemented. At the start of 2 April 1944, the HQ of the III Panzer Corps received the following message from Hube:

Today, despite all the orders, I have seen motor vehicles in various troops that no longer have any right to exist. The troops have not yet realized what is at stake. Every unnecessarily carried motor vehicle is a sabotage of the army's mission. The fuel belongs in the tanks, combat vehicles and most important command and supply motor vehicles. It is impossible for a panzer division today to carry field mail, field kitchen trailers, full supply and workshop units. All panzer divisions would probably be capable of movement and thrust all the way to our breakthrough objective if their fuel were in vital motor vehicles and not irresponsibly wasted. I expect radical adaptation to situation.

In addition to motor vehicle losses, the 1st Panzer Army lost a considerable number of various repair, recovery and other specialized vehicles of the maintenance services. This had a major detrimental effect on subsequent attempts to restore the combat effectiveness of army's mobile formations, the operational strength of their vehicles and weapons. With regards to this, already on 12 April 1944, two days after the breakout was fully complete but the overall scale of material losses was not yet clear, the command of the 1st Panzer Army came to general conclusions, as noted in its war diary:

Much equipment, especially that of the supply troops [Versorgungstruppen], was lost or had to be destroyed. For the panzer divisions and army’s general headquarters combat units, the loss of almost all maintenance services is extremely sensitive.

As a result of the 12–19 April 1944 investigation, the following number of specialized vehicles and various wheeled equipment of maintenance services was reported as permanently lost (Totalausfälle).

Total irrecoverable losses of repair, recovery and other wheeled equipment of maintenance units in the pocket
Vehicle	Total lost	Notes
Small repair vehicles	397	Kfz. 2/40- kleiner Instandsetzungskraftwagen.
Workshop motor vehicles	33	Kfz. 79- Werkstattkraftwagen.
Rotary crane motor vehicles	16	Kfz. 100- Drehkrankraftwagen, Hebekraft 3t.
Rotary crane heavy half-track vehicles	6	Sd. Kfz. 9/1- Drehkrankraftwagen, Hebekraft 6t.
Specialized trucks of all capacities (light, medium, heavy)	70	Spezialized trucks (Lastkraftwagen) with various installations (for spare parts, equipment etc.) of maintenance units (Instandsetzungsstaffeln)
Wheeled electric heavy machine sets of all types, towed like a trailer	102	Schwerer Maschinensatz A; Maschinensatz 220/380 V, etwa 7,5 kVA als Anhänger etc.
Other specialized wheeled equipment	37	
Total	661	

At the time of the breakout on 6 April 1944, the command of the 1st Panzer Division submitted a report to the LIX Army Corps about the condition of the division. The report noted that due to the heavy losses in motor vehicles, the loss of nearly all of the maintenance and repair facilities, their equipment, the divisional supply and support units became inoperable:

The following no longer exist: the entire motor park units, the administrative units, the majority of supply units, the field post office, all repair and maintenance sections, tank workshop platoons, the majority of repair units, 50% of the field kitchens, all ration supply trains, 75% of the other supply trains; in addition, the majority of the signals equipment of the troops is missing.

Similarly, on 6 April 1944, the 7th Panzer Division submitted its condition report to the command of the LIX Army Corps, in which the crippling material losses and their impact are highlighted:

In terms of command and control equipment, the division only has a small stock of radio and telephone equipment.
Within the current small battle group, the connections with these means are provisional and completely inadequate for the deployment of the full division.
Since there is also a considerable shortage of messenger vehicles [Meldefahrzeugen] as a result of the significant total loss [Totalausfälle] of Volkswagens, motorcycles and half-track motorcycles, the division's command and control resources must be described as inadequate.
In terms of motor vehicles, the division had to destroy the majority of its vehicles in accordance with orders. The Panzergrenadiers and Panzer Pioneers are therefore no longer motorized and mobile. Parts of the other units are also dependent on foot marches.
The division has no supply and repair services (except for 1 repair unit in the armoured artillery regiment). Furthermore, with the exception of a few field kitchens, rations and ammunition wagons, the majority of combat and rations supply trains are lost.

The final category of losses is regarding the armoured vehicles of all classifications. Just like with motor vehicle losses, the list is mostly complete, but losses of the 1st SS Panzer Division LSSAH are not included. Losses of the two Tiger tank battalions that were trapped in the pocket (503rd and 509th) are not listed either. All of this is described below, after the table.

Total irrecoverable losses of armoured vehicles of all classifications in the pocket
Armoured vehicle	Total lost	Notes
Panzers	322	Panzer II, III, IV, Panther. Tigers not included in this count.
StuG's	39	StuG III and IV.
Self-propelled tank destroyers	64	Marder II, III, Nashorn.
Self-propelled artillery	79	Wespe, Hummel, Grille.
Light armoured reconnaissance vehicles	47	Leichter Panzerspähwagen- Sd.Kfz. 221, Sd.Kfz. 222, Sd.Kfz. 223 Funklenk.
Heavy armoured reconnaissance vehicles	65	Schwerer Panzerspähwagen- Sd.Kfz. 231, Sd.Kfz. 232 Funklenk, Sd.Kfz. 233.
Light armoured personnel carriers	224	Leichte Schützenpanzerwagen- Sd.Kfz. 250 and its numerous variants.
Medium armoured personnel carriers	371	Mittlere Schützenpanzerwagen- Sd.Kfz. 251 and its numerous variants.
Total	1,211	

Precise losses of the 1st SS Panzer Division LSSAH in armoured vehicles are unknown but most of them were certainly lost. Just like with motor vehicles, comparison of the armoured vehicle status for 1 March 1944 and 1 May 1944, provides a good indication.

LSSAH armoured vehicle status on 1 March 1944
Vehicle	Authorized	Operational	In repairs	Total available
Panzer III	13	1	3	4
Panzer IV	94	0	30	30
Panther	94	12	46	58
Tiger	42	1	17	18
StuG	40	3	15	18
Self-propelled artillery	27	0	9	9
Armoured personnel carriers	214	35	79	114

Two months later, when it was in Belgium, only a fraction of armoured vehicles was left.

LSSAH armoured vehicle status on 1 May 1944
Vehicle	Authorized	Total available (operational and in repairs)	Shortages
Panzer IV	96	0	96
Panther	96	0	96
Self-propelled artillery	18	0	18
Armoured personnel carriers	214	16	198

Similarly to motor vehicles, some of the non-operational tanks of LSSAH found themselves outside the pocket. According to Guderian report in early May 1944, these vehicles were evacuated by rail and sent back to Germany for further repairs. As a result, in the 1 May 1944 status report of LSSAH, when it was refitting at the Beverloo training area in Belgium, these tanks are not included, since they were in Germany. Nonetheless, its clear that most of LSSAH’s armoured vehicles and armoured personnel carriers were lost in the pocket.

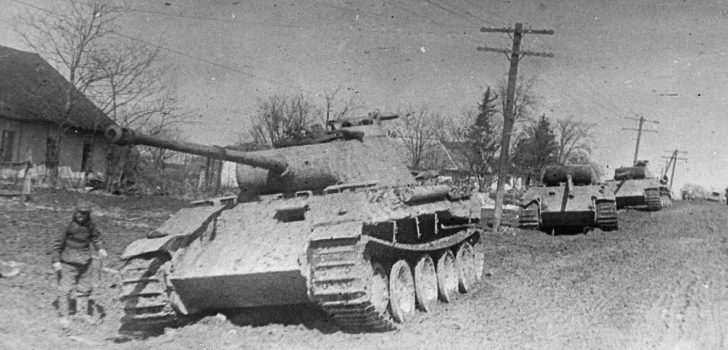
Panther tanks, abandoned by the Germans, in the vicinity of Proskurov, end of March 1944.

At the time of the breakout on 7 April 1944, LSSAH had a total operational strength of 2 Tigers and 9 Stug’s. In terms of Tiger tanks, the heavy tank company, attached to LSSAH, lost most of its tanks by the time the breakout was complete. According to the company report, 75% of Tigers were lost due to self-destruction (to prevent capture), 15% were lost in combat operations and 10% were lost due to other causes.

Other units not included in this report are the 503rd and 509th Heavy Tiger Tank Battalions. According to the history of the 503rd Battalion, after the breakout in April 1944, the battalion was 'bled white' as far as tanks are concerned. On 1 March 1944, this battalion had a total of 24 operational Tigers and 10 in repair. In May 1944, the 503rd Battalion was withdrawn to Ohrdruf training area in Thuringia for complete refitting. Similarly, the 509th Tiger battalion lost most of its tanks as well. As of 1 March 1944, it had 28 operational Tigers. At the time of the breakout on 9 April 1944, only one operational Tiger was left.

With the addition of the 1st SS Panzer Division LSSAH, 503rd and 509th Tiger battalions, the overall number of panzers and StuG’s lost, including Tigers that are not included in the table above, was well over 400. In the same way, the number of other armoured vehicles lost (Schützenpanzerwagen and Panzerspähwagen) was higher. According to the data available for 7 April 1944, when the first contact with the German relief forces was established, the German units had the following number of operational armoured vehicles.

Number of operational armoured combat vehicles of the units of Korpsgruppe Chevallerie at the time of the breakout. Status: 7 April 1944.
Unit	Panzer IV	Panther	Tiger	StuG	Self-propelled artillery
1st SS Panzer Division LSSAH	-	-	2	9	-
1st Panzer Division	-	2	-	1	13
7th Panzer Division	2	-	1	-	13
16th Panzer Division	5	3	-	1	-
19th Panzer Division	-	-	-	-	-
20th Panzergrenadier Division	-	-	-	1	4

In terms of the number of artillery pieces lost in the pocket, precise calculations were not done, however, as the army's war diary noted on 12 April 1944, most of it was lost in the pocket and only a small number was preserved. Although an investigation was not done about the exact losses of artillery pieces, the overall scale of their losses can be calculated with high level of accuracy, by comparing the artillery status of the 1st Panzer Army units in mid-March and mid-April 1944, for which the reports are available. Specifically, the status for 10–12 March 1944, prepared by the General der Artillerie department of the OKH (General der Artillerie im Oberkommando des Heeres), as well as the status for 13 April 1944 (three days after the breakout was fully complete), prepared by High Command of Army Group North Ukraine for the aforementioned department.

For the 10–12 March 1944 report, the artillery holdings of all divisions of the 1st Panzer Army and its GHQ artillery units, all of which soon will be encircled in the Kamenets–Podolsky pocket, are included. In addition, it includes three divisions of the neighboring 4th Panzer Army- 68th Infantry Division, 7th Panzer Division and the 1st SS Panzer Division LSSAH. On that date, these three divisions were subordinated to the 4th Panzer Army, however, once the Red Army will collapse the German front and the contact between the 1st and 4th Panzer Armies will be lost, these divisions will find themselves in the space of the 1st Panzer Army and will be re-subordinated to it. These three made up the 'Mauss Group' (Gruppe Mauss) in the pocket, named after the commander of the 7th Panzer Division Karl Mauss, which was part of the Korpsgruppe Chevallerie. The 13 April 1944 report once again includes all divisions and GHQ artillery units, whose artillery holdings were reported a month ago and which were then encircled in the pocket, including the Mauss Group (now part of the army). Note that the category of 'Available' in the table below includes artillery pieces that are both operational and in short-term repair.

Artillery strength of the 1st Panzer Army before the encirclement and after the breakout
Date	10.5 cm leFH 18	15 cm sFH 18	10 cm schwere Kanone 18	15 cm Kanone 18, 17 cm Kanone 18, 21 cm Mörser 18
10–12 March 1944	378 76 Wespe 454 in total	146 40 Hummel 186 in total	44	30
13 April 1944	180 24 Wespe 204 in total	31 24 Hummel 55 in total	16	-

Thus, in terms of the 10.5 cm leFH 18, the number decreased by 250 (-55%) in one month, the 15 cm sFH 18 decreased by 131 (-70%), the 10 cm schwere Kanone 18 decreased by 28 (64%), while in terms of the 15 cm Kanone 18, 17 cm Kanone 18 and 21 cm Mörser 18 there were none left. The very poor shape of the 18th Artillery Division after the breakout, a powerful mobile artillery formation before the encirclement, is especially indicative of the scale of the artillery losses sustained by the 1st Panzer Army.

Artillery strength of the 18th Artillery Division before the encirclement and after the breakout
Date	10.5 cm leFH 18	15 cm sFH 18	10 cm schwere Kanone 18	15 cm Kanone 18, 17 cm Kanone 18, 21 cm Mörser 18
10–12 March 1944	31 10 Wespe 41 in total	22 5 Hummel 27 in total	12	18
13 April 1944	10 4 Wespe 14 in total	3 1 Hummel 4 in total	4	-

Although these 1st Panzer Army artillery reports are complete in relation to the indicated weapons above, they do not include reports on other types of artillery, such as the heavy infantry guns (15 cm sIG 33), their self-propelled variants (Grille) and others. There is information available for the number of Grille lost, based on the investigation of the 12–19 April 1944, whose results are seen above- a total of 17 Grille were lost in the pocket, from the 6th, 16th and 17th Panzer Divisions.

The very poor overall material condition of the 19th Panzer Division after the conclusion of the heavy battles in April 1944 is one of numerous examples of the condition of the 1st Panzer Army divisions after the breakout and subsequent battles to stabilize the front. All the major material problems, which hamstrung the divisions after the breakout and the 1st Panzer Army as a whole, are highlighted in the divisional status report (Zustandsbericht) of the 19th Panzer Division on 1 May 1944- the tremendous shortage of motor vehicles meant that divisional movement, supply and combat management faced huge difficulties, the loss of nearly all maintenance services meant that proper restoration of remaining vehicles and weapons back to full operational state was no longer feasible, while enormous losses in armoured vehicles, artillery, anti-tank guns and all kinds of supporting equipment meant that these weapons could be used to limited extent only. The acting commander of the 19th Panzer Division, Oberst Walter Denkert, reported the following material condition of the division:

Special difficulties:
Due to the loss of the greater part of its motor vehicles in the battles of 4 March- 6 April 1944, the division is almost immobile. The few remaining motor vehicles are almost all in need of major overhaul. Supply of the troops encounters the greatest difficulties from this.
There is only one workshop company left. The Armoured-Workshop-Company 27 is not operational due to a complete lack of equipment. The spare parts section is not usable because of missing motor vehicles and storage cabinets for the mobile spare parts supply. For the most part, the regiments and even battalions are no longer in possession of their repair and maintenance section. Proper restoration of motor vehicles and weapons in need of repair is therefore no longer ensured in any way.
Complete lack of armour-piercing weapons in the panzergrenadier regiments and the armoured reconnaissance battalion. The Tank-Destroyer-Battalion 619 has only 2 heavy anti-tank guns towed by prime movers and 4 partially operational self-propelled tank destroyers, which can only move on the roads.
Armoured-Artillery-Regiment 19 can now be deployed only to some extent, since large and small equipment of all kinds was lost in such huge quantities in the recent battles that full-fledged work can no longer be done in any area.
Severe shortage of communications motor vehicles and radios, especially in the Armoured-Signals-Battalion 19 and Armoured-Artillery-Regiment 19.
Degree of mobility of the division:
25%.
Combat value and usability:
Fit for limited defensive operations.

The vehicle and weapon holdings of the division at the start of May were the following, as reported in the same status report.

Material condition of the 19th Panzer Division. Status: 1 May 1944.
Item	Authorized	Operational	In repair	Total available
Panzer III	8	-	1 (13%)	1 (13%)
Panzer IV	93	-	-	-
Panther	3	-	-	-
Armoured personnel carriers	108	2 (2%)	-	2 (2%)
Self-propelled tank destroyers	45	4 (9%)	-	4 (9%)
Motorcycles	753	33 (4%)	7 (1%)	40 (5%)
Passenger cars	773	81 (10%)	24 (3%)	105 (14%)
Trucks (incl. Maultier's)	1,676	282 (17%)	83 (5%)	365 (22%)
Prime movers	184	21 (11%)	15 (8%)	36 (20%)
Heavy anti-tank guns	23	2 (9%)	-	2 (9%)
Artillery pieces	42	14 (33%)	-	14 (33%)
Machine-guns	1,114	147 (13%)	9 (1%)	156 (14%)
2-cm Flak guns	57	6 (11%)	1 (2%)	7 (12%)
Sub-machine guns	1,013	371 (37%)	4 (0.4%)	375 (37%)

Konstantin Simonov, a well-known Soviet writer and wartime correspondent, who was with the 1st Ukrainian Front at the time in April 1944, described the areas left by the retreating 1st Panzer Army, which were littered with abandoned vehicles and equipment:

It has long been difficult to surprise my imagination with such things, and yet, having come here, day after day I am amazed by the number of vehicles of all brands and systems abandoned by the Germans- both combat and transport. Here are the notorious "Tigers" and "Panthers", burned and whole; and tanks of older types, and self-propelled guns, and huge armoured personnel carriers, and small transporters with one driving wheel, similar to motorcycles, and huge blunt-nosed "Renault" trucks stolen in France, and endless "Mercedes" and "Opel" trucks, staff cars, radios, field kitchens, anti-aircraft guns, disinfection trailers- in a word, everything that the Germans invented and used in their former rapid offensives. And that now, broken, burned and simply abandoned, is stuck in the mud of these roads.
In some places it is almost impossible to drive in the middle of all this. At the bridges and on the cliffs lie mountains of broken iron, which were once cars, thrown down from the road. They had to be pushed off the road in both directions, in order to pass and drive through, because in some places they stood stuck on the road in rows of three and four.

=== Personnel condition ===
The overall personnel losses of the 1st Panzer Army in the pocket were not excessive, but its divisional combat units sustained heavy losses, meaning that their combat strength (Gefechtsstärke) at the time of the breakout was reduced to remnants or just a fraction of what they were supposed to have. The breakthrough battles had tremendously eroded the personnel strength of the 1st Panzer Army divisions, which had already been depleted before they were encircled, by nearly three weeks of heavy combat since the start of the Soviet Proskurov-Chernovtsy Operation on 4 March 1944. To refit the decimated combat units, divisions resorted to putting various specialists and personnel from the supply services into the combat ranks, which meant that the troop training level, quality and internal cohesion level had significantly declined.

In addition, the general physical and mental state of the troops had considerably deteriorated at the time of the breakout, as a result of continuous heavy combat and difficult retreats in spring mud and snowstorms. The incessant combat in these conditions meant that troops had no time to tend to their hygienic needs, clothing was badly worn (especially footwear), while hot meals were a rarity. A sizable number of soldiers were put out of action due to various type of sickness (severe lice infestation, various intestinal disorders, trench foot, frostbite etc.) resulting from these conditions.

This combination of combat losses and sickness had depleted the actual combat strength of the 1st Panzer Army divisions to such an extent that only a fraction of it remained, based on their authorized strength (Sollstärke). In terms of authorized strength, at the end of 1943, as a result of heavy losses on the Eastern Front, the OKH ordered the existing infantry divisions to be converted into the infantry divisions of 'new type 44' (Infanterie Division neuer Art 44). The main aim was, while preserving its essential component parts, to somewhat reduce the overall strength of the division, by removing surplus support services and staffs, as well as reducing the overall number of infantry battalions. The same principles were adopted in panzer divisions. The table below shows the authorized strength of infantry and panzer divisions at the start of 1944. Depending on the composition of the unit, its authorized strength may be slightly higher or lower, therefore, these numbers serve as a general guideline.

Authorized strength of German infantry division and panzer division at the start of 1944
Strength	Infantry Division	Panzer Division
Total authorized strength (Sollstärke)	13,463	13,914
Total combat strength (Gefechtsstärke)	9,071	8,804
Infantry combat strength (Infanterie-Gefechtsstärke)	6,502	-

Just how badly depleted the 1st Panzer Army formations were at the time of the breakout can be seen from numerous reports, prepared by the staffs of the encircled corps’, regarding the condition of their subordinated divisions. All of them share the same points- heavily understrength divisions, especially in terms of combat strength, tremendous physical exhaustion, only a fraction of authorized weapons, motor vehicles and armored vehicles available, low overall 'combat value' (Kampfwert). The report prepared by the management department (Ia- Führungsabteilung) of the XXXXVI Panzer Corps of Korpsgruppe Breith, about the condition of its divisions several days before the breakout, is one of many of this type.

Condition of the divisions of the XXXXVI Panzer Corps. Status: 2 April 1944.
Unit	Total combat strength (Gefechtsstärke)	Artillery	Anti-tank guns	Value judgement
1st Infantry Division	1,411	4 light and 2 heavy field howitzers	0	Fit for limited defensive operations only (Kampfwert IV)
75th Infantry Division	1,922	8 light field howitzers	1	Fit for limited defensive operations only (Kampfwert IV)
82nd Infantry Division	809	6 light field howitzers	0	Fit for limited defensive operations only (Kampfwert IV)
168th Infantry Division	1,100	17 light and 2 heavy field howitzers	7	Fit for limited defensive operations only (Kampfwert IV)
371st Infantry Division	1,000	2 heavy field howitzers	0	Fit for limited defensive operations only (Kampfwert IV)

The XXIV Panzer Corps, which was part of the Korpsgruppe Chevallerie, was in a poor shape as well. On 8 April, It consisted of the 208th, 291st Infantry Divisions, as well as the remnants of the 68th Infantry Division and the 1st SS Panzer Division LSSAH. On that day, the command of the XXIV Panzer Corps wrote a detailed report about its condition and situation:

1.) Value judgment/weekly report:
The assessment of the entire corps on 6 April [1944] does not give a judgment on the divisions, but on the makeshift units of battalion or regimental strength, formed from the remnants of the division in question under the name of the division.
These remnant units are not capable of solving even small independent divisional tasks, since they have lost a large part of the rear services and command means.
2.) For the defense of the 24 km long main battle line [Hauptkampflinie], the corps has at its disposal a total of:
a) about 10,000 men ration strength [Verpflegungsstärke], of which:
- 6,700 men total combat strength [Gefechtsstärke],
- 3,273 infantry combat strength [Infanterie-Gefechtsstärke].
b) 236 machine-guns.
c) 25 heavy anti-tank guns.
d) 30 mortars.
e) 9 operational tanks and 9 operational assault guns.
This numerical strength corresponds approximately to the authorized strength of an infantry division, with machine-guns only a third of an infantry division. The actual combat value of the corps does not correspond to the strength of an infantry division for the following reasons:
a) The corps is composed of remnants of 4 divisions. It is not a unified, equipped, trained force.
b) The internal combat value of the soldiers is below average. The withdrawal battles have stretched the soldiers physically and mentally to the limits of their capabilities. The clothing is torn, especially footwear is inadequate. The soldier is obedient and quiet, sometimes almost apathetic, therefore not very suitable for heavy defensive fighting.
c) In the combat troops there are many people from the rear supply services and so on, a lot of scattered people. There is a particular lack of combat-experienced officers, non-commissioned officers and enlisted men.
d) Artillery and heavy weapons are few or unusable because there is hardly any ammunition. In heavy artillery, 2 heavy guns, almost without ammunition, are available for the 24 km wide section.

The hardest hit division in the pocket was the 82nd Infantry Division. It operated as one of the rearguard infantry divisions of the XXXXVI Panzer Corps of Korpsgruppe Breith, on the eastern side of the pocket. In a weekly report of the XXXXVI Panzer Corps on 2 April 1944, it was reported that 82nd Infantry Division sustained 'heavy personnel and material losses', as a result of which it had the lowest combat strength (809 men) of all divisions and no anti-tank guns. On 4 April 1944, due to situation, the division was sent to reinforce the neighboring III Panzer Corps, also part of Korpsgruppe Breith. In the war diary (Kriegstagebuch) of the III Panzer Corps, entry for 4 April 1944, it is noted that 1st Panzer Army high command criticized the decision of the command of the XXXXVI Panzer Corps to send its weakest division (82nd) to reinforce the III Panzer Corps, ordering to replace it with another instead. But since the detachment of the 82nd Infantry Division was already in progress when the army order arrived, it was sent nonetheless.

The breakout from the pocket and several weeks of hard fighting afterwards, in order to stabilize the front along the Strypa river, meant that by the end of April 1944 the 82nd Infantry Division was in remnants. Its strength at the end of the month is shown in the table. The German term 'actual strength' (Iststärke), seen in the table, refers to all personnel that are organic part of the unit's composition. Thus, it includes divisional personnel that might be on leave, temporarily attached to other units, absent for whatever other reason, as well as wounded and sick personnel that are recovering in unit's area of operations and are expected to return to service within the space of 8 weeks. Therefore, Iststärke is not an indicator of the unit's actual combat capabilities or that this number were all combat troops. It is used for planning and organizational purposes, calculating the unit's overall strength based on how many personnel in total, combat and non-combat, were part of its establishment. On 10 May 1944, the worn-out Kampfgruppe 82nd Infantry Division was ordered to be disbanded by Army Group North Ukraine high command, with its remaining combat-worthy elements to be incorporated into the neighboring 254th Infantry Division, itself severely depleted.

Strength of the Kampfgruppe 82nd Infantry Division at the end of April 1944.
Strength	Officers	Civilian officials	NCO's	Enlisted men	Hiwi's	Total
Actual strength (Iststärke) on 29 April 1944:	92	2	535	2,600	118	3,347
Total combat strength (Gefechtsstärke) on 27 April 1944:	40	-	138	909	-	1,087
Frontline infantry combat strength (Kampfstärke) on 27 April 1944:	29	-	96	682	-	807

The panzer divisions, operating as armoured spearheads and battering ram on the way to the west, were heavily understrength and exhausted by the time the contact was re-established with the relief forces of the II SS Panzer Corps. As one of the armoured spearheads of Korpsgruppe Chevallerie on the way to the west, the 16th Panzer Division was engaged in continuous combat and movements for weeks in adverse weather conditions. Three days before the breakout was complete, the command of the 16th Panzer Division submitted a detailed combat strength report to the command of the XXIV Panzer Corps, showing how badly weakened its combat elements were.

Combat strength (Gefechtsstärke) of the 16th Panzer Division, with breakdown by combat unit. Status: 5 April 1944.
Unit	Officers	NCO's	Enlisted men	Total
Panzer-Regiment 2	1	14	19	34
Panzergrenadier-Regiment 64	14	61	302	377
Panzergrenadier-Regiment 79	12	82	455	549
Armoured-Artillery-Regiment 16	6	28	95	129
Armoured-Reconnaissance-Battalion 16	9	67	332	408
Armoured-Engineer-Battalion 16	5	27	155	187
Flak-Regiment 713	1	8	41	50
Total	48	287	1,399	1,734

Similarly, the 19th Panzer Division saw heavy fighting in the first week of April, as well as encountering tremendous difficulties in movement and supply. In the 11 April 1944 after-action report, prepared by the management department of the 19th Panzer Division, the operations of the division for 2–5 April 1944 are described:

There was no passable supply route to Tarnawka. Ammunition and fuel had to be transferred to Pilatkowce and transported by supply columns, so that despite the use of all available forces, the supply of armoured vehicles and heavy weapons could not be completed until the afternoon [3 April]. The panzergrenadiers and engineers had very high losses during the night. After the non-stop day and night operations, it was not possible to conduct the attack ordered for 10:00 a.m. [4 April] with the remnants of both formations without the support of the heavy weapons that had not yet been supplied. Orders to attack remained, however, so that the few infantry forces still available had to be deployed as shock troops. These, however, were stopped in heavy defensive fire from field positions on elevation 295 shortly after they had been deployed. The attack to reach the ordered line on the western edge of Dawidkowce and the high ground northwest of it was then prepared as planned for 5 April.
[...]
Offensive and defensive battles in these days made the highest and last demands on the troops. In particular, the physical strain caused by the heaviest snowstorms, completely impassable paths and terrain, and continuous operations without the possibility of warming up, resting, or proper rations was extremely high. Exhaustion caused several casualties, including deaths. The performance of troop commanders and soldiers under these most difficult combat conditions could not be surpassed.

Losses of the 19th Panzer Division for 2–5 April 1944 amounted to 172 killed, wounded and missing in total. As divisional command noted in this same report, by the end of 5 April, these losses amounted to a staggering 45% of the initial combat strength (Gefechtsstärke) that division had at the start of 2 April. Due to decimated combat ranks, the division had to refit them with drivers from the supply services, but the strength did not improve- several days after the breakout, the division reported that its 'trench strength' (Grabenstärke), that is, a number of infantry deployed at the front edge, was only 200 soldiers. On 11 April 1944, the total divisional infantry combat strength (Gefechtsstärke), including headquarter staffs and troops on standby, was the following.

Infantry combat strength (Gefechtsstärke) of the 19th Panzer Division on 11 April 1944
Unit	Officers	NCO's	Enlisted men	Total	Notes
Panzergrenadier-Regiment 73	7	43	204	254	Includes "alarm units" (Alarmeinheiten), formed from personnel of supply units for combat deployment
Panzergrenadier-Regiment 74	13	50	254	317	Includes "alarm units" (Alarmeinheiten), formed from personnel of supply units for combat deployment
Armoured-Engineer-Battalion 19	5	12	65	82	
Total	25	105	523	653	

Due to the severely depleted combat ranks, as well as the loss of most of the vehicles, weapons and equipment of the supply services, the command of the 1st Panzer Division was forced to use various types of rear area personnel for deployment at the front as infantry units. In a 6 April 1944 report, about the condition of the division, the command of the 1st Panzer Division wrote:

The reported combat strengths [Gefechtsstärken] of the fighting troops (panzergrenadiers, armoured reconnaissance battalion, armoured engineer battalion) are made up of the soldiers who have been combed out due to the loss of weapons, motor vehicles and supply trains from all other units, including supply services. The combat value [Kampfwert] therefore does not correspond in any way to the numerical strength purely in terms of training. A large proportion of the fighting troops are currently sick or slightly wounded soldiers, whose deployment is only justified in this exceptional situation. Once normal combat conditions will be restored, the specialists currently deployed with the panzergrenadiers, in particular tank drivers, anti-tank personnel, workshop company specialists, bakers, butchers and so on, will have to be returned to their actual tasks. As a result, the combat strength will again be considerably reduced in terms of numbers. The field replacement battalion, together with the march battalion (about 400 men), as well as several hundred vacationers, are separated from the division and last reported in Stanislau [now Ivano-Frankivsk].
Evaluation: Division will be "suitable for offensive tasks with limited objectives" after the supply of all vacationers, as well as sufficient personnel replacements, missing weapons, equipment and above all motor vehicles in the near future, currently it is "fully suitable for defense", however, a significant weakening of the specialists currently deployed as panzergerenadiers (see above) must be expected, which will have a decisive influence on a later refitting of the division.

The 6th Panzer Division had a distinction to be the first division from the encircled 1st Panzer Army to establish contact with the forward elements of the II SS Panzer Corps. Specifically, the 114th Panzergrenadier Regiment of the 6th Panzer Division was the unit that established first contact with elements of the 10th SS Panzer Division Frundsberg in the area of Buchach at 17.05 on 6 April 1944. The decimated state of the regiment is seen from the report about its condition on that day, prepared by regimental staff.

Strength of the 114th Panzergrenadier Regiment of the 6th Panzer Division on 6 April 1944
Strength	Officers	Civilian officials	NCO's	Enlisted men	Total
Combat strength (Gefechtsstärke)	19	-	36	188	243
Ration strength (Verpflegungsstärke)	22	1	73	260	356

This report also noted that two-thirds of its panzergrenadiers had front-line experience of less than three months, while the majority of non-commissioned officers came from supply services. For these reasons, the report emphasized an urgent need of fully qualified NCO's and adequate training. The mobility of the regiment with motor vehicles was only at 30%. After the breakout and several more weeks of heavy combat to stabilize the front, the 6th Panzer Division was badly worn by the start of May 1944- its panzergrenadier battalions had on average just 45% of their authorized personnel, panzer regiment 41%, while anti-tank battalion just 31%. In the monthly status report (Zustandsbericht) of the 6th Panzer Division for 1 May 1944, its divisional commander, Generalmajor Rudolf Freiherr von Waldenfels, reported:

Training Status. As a result of the heavy losses of the last months, almost complete lack of training opportunities and after the loss of valuable specialists, since they had to be deployed as panzergrenadiers, the training level of the division has deteriorated considerably. In order to regain the required level of training, it is urgent to first bring back appropriate non-commissioned officers, since the necessary training personnel is no longer available, except for panzer regiment and artillery.
[...]
Special difficulties. The present situation of weapons, motor vehicles and specialists is so bad in every respect that special difficulties cannot be emphasized.

The 7th Panzer Division operated to the north of the 6th Panzer Division and therefore was among the first divisions to establish contact with the relief forces. On 6 April 1944, the command of the 7th Panzer Division submitted its condition report to the command of the LIX Army Corps. In addition to the huge material losses of all sorts, pointed out in that report, the report noted the poor overall condition of the troops:

The state of clothing must be described as poor. There is a great shortage of footwear and underwear.
The panzergrenadiers and armoured engineers in particular are completely exhausted due to the continuous deployment and the long marches in difficult terrain. The majority of the division is heavily infested with lice.
The division is not fit for action.

As a result of continuous heavy combat since the start of March 1944, including the encirclement and breakout from the Kamenets–Podolsky pocket, the 7th Panzer Division was significantly understrength by mid-April 1944. By that point, its strength, aside from parts of the division that were not physically present with it or it attached to other divisions, was just a fraction of what it was supposed to have. It was subordinated to the LIX Army Corps.

Strength of the Kampfgruppe 7th Panzer Division on 16 April 1944
Category	Strength	Notes
Total ration strength (Verpflegungsstärke)	2,454	Total strength of the division. Includes all combat and non-combat personnel.
Total combat strength (Gefechtsstärke)	1,892	Total strength of all combat units- panzer troops, panzergrenadiers, engineers, reckon, artillery, anti-tank etc.
Total trench strength (Grabenstärke)	960	Total strength of infantry units (panzergrenadiers, engineers, reckon etc.) deployed in the forward trenches.

In the same 16 April 1944 report, the commander of the division, Generalmajor Karl Mauss, gave the following judgement on the combat value of the division, which is similar to the report submitted 10 days ago:

Value judgement.
With its personnel and material forces currently in action, the division represents only a combat group that is still sufficiently equipped in terms of weaponry in relation to its personnel strength, but which is only capable of attack and defense for a short time due to physical exhaustion and also psychological fatigue, especially of the panzergrenadiers and armoured engineers, who have been in continuous action for months.
The division as such must already be described as no longer operational.

The 20th Panzergrenadier Division (LIX Army Corps), which operated as a rearguard formation on the eastern side of the pocket, was badly weakened by the time the encirclement ring was to open. In a 6 April 1944 condition report, the command of the division noted that division as a whole no longer resembled a cohesive and effective fighting unit, due its poor material and personnel condition:

Repair services and supply units are materially destroyed. The specialists are deployed as grenadiers. Command and control equipment only partially available. Radio stations are mostly transported on requisitioned Panje [horse-drawn] wagons and horses. There are still 4 field kitchens in the division.
Mobility of the motorized parts of the division: 2%.
The clothing of the soldiers is tattered. Many people have foot problems. Everyone is covered in lice. Physical condition badly affected by constant fighting, marching and little sleep.
The steadfastness of the troops, which are thrown together from all types of units and largely untrained for infantry duty, is largely dependent on the presence of their officer. If he is absent, crises arise.
In its current state, the division can no longer be considered a division. In the current emergency situation, the troops are doing their duty to the last in attack and defense under strict leadership. Despite everything, the mood is unwaveringly positive. Relationship between superiors and subordinates exemplary. In order to have the 20th Panzergrenadier Division [fully operational] again, a total refitting is necessary.

As for the strength of the divisions of the LIX Army Corps, one week after the breakout, it was the following.

Strength and operational armoured vehicles of the LIX Army Corps units. Status: 16 April 1944.
Unit	Total combat strength (Gefechtsstärke)	Total ration strength (Verpflegungsstärke)	Panzer	StuG	Marder
1st Panzer Division	3,389	7,693	2 Panthers	1	7
7th Panzer Division	1,892	2,454	4 Panzer IV's, 1 Panzer III	-	6
20th Panzergrenadier Division	2,866	5,073	-	-	6
254th Infantry Division	1,410	3,700	-	-	5
291st Infantry Division	1,422	2,187	-	2	-
371st Infantry Division	2,474	4,510	-	-	5

In terms of physical health, as can be seen already, the condition of the troops of the 1st Panzer Army had fallen sharply by the time the breakout was achieved, due to continuous movement in adverse weather conditions, without ability to have proper rest, meal and perform hygiene matters, with clothing, especially footwear, being torn. In turn, this frequently produced apathetic behavior, sense of depression, demoralization. SS-Sturmbannführer Otto Weidinger described the condition and mood of the troops of the regimental-sized SS-Kampfgruppe Das Reich in the pocket:

It required all the efforts and watchfulness of the officers and the non-commissioned officers to rouse the men and get them going again. The excessive physical exertions and the constant overtiredness often made many completely apathetic. In one case a young company commander, who had tried in vain to get a soldier to resume marching, finally saw no other way to save the man than to draw his pistol. He threatened to use the weapon if the man did not immediately get up and accompany the rest. The exhausted man stood up and said apathetically, “Then shoot me and get it over with!” With the help of some of his comrades who had interrupted their march, after a brief rest during which he regained a little of his strength the soldier was finally convinced to carry on.
[…]
Casualties grew daily. The winter clothing of many men hung down in tatters and in many places the red stuffing of the insulated vests was visible. The state of the men’s footwear deteriorated. The last haircuts and last shaves lay far in the past.
[…]
So for us these weeks-long defensive battles and fighting withdrawals in the “traveling pocket” were the most strenuous and hardest mission of this winter [1943-44]. Of the three-thousand men the battle group had at its formation there was approximately one-thousand left.

In the activity report for April 1944, the 1st Panzer Army doctor (Armee-Arzt) described the condition of the troops at the time of the breakout:

The difficulties that had existed for some time as a result of the ongoing mobile warfare in the implementation of tight health management reached a particularly high level at the beginning of the reporting period in the Kamenetz-Podolsk area. Delousing measures, recording and registration of infectious diseases, as well as the implementation of orderly disease control had become impossible.
[...]
The general state of nutrition as well as the general state of strength of the troops were considerably reduced at the time of the opening of the encirclement ring. During the fighting in the encirclement, the troops had to rely exclusively on food supplies from the countryside, which had a particularly unfavorable effect on the [infantry] divisions marching from the east in defense of the rear wall of the encirclement ring. The total lack of bread was particularly serious. The simultaneous heavy physical strain hit the troops, who had often been stretched to their limit by months of previous defensive fighting.
[...]
The lice infestation had reached an extremely high level due to the impossibility of carrying out major delousing measures since the beginning of March. The incidence of infectious diseases was very low, precise numerical documentation cannot be provided. At the front, the most important immediate measure was the delousing of the troops.

When the first contact of the 1st Panzer Army had been re-established with the German relief forces of the II SS Panzer Corps at the end of 6 April 1944, the 10th SS Panzer Division Frundsberg was the spearhead of the relief force. SS-Untersturmführer Hans-Dietrich Sauter was among the soldiers of Frundsberg who met the first German troops marching out of encirclement. In the history of the 10th SS Panzer Division, the following impressions are noted:

Many Army and SS troops that fought their way out of the pocket around Kamenez-Podolsk were absorbed into the 10th SS Panzer Division. The appearance of the withdrawing troops markedly contradicted the expectations of the young SS volunteers. The experiences of their first engagement did not prepare them for the reality of the situation in the East. German propaganda of victory on the battlefield quickly dissipated at the sight of their beaten comrades. According to SS-Untersturmführer Hans-Dietrich Sauter, the adjutant of the 1st Battalion, 10th SS Panzer Artillery Regiment, “The bewildered look of disbelief was expressed on every young soldier's face.”
[…]
Sauter, the adjutant for the 1st Battalion, 10th SS Panzer Artillery Regiment, whose mission it was to establish contact with the tank regiment, attached himself to the 21st SS-Panzergrenadier Regiment heading from Monasterzyska to Buczacz. In a halftrack, Sauter encountered the first German soldiers coming out of the pocket. Battered, the men stumbled past the halftrack, many supported by their comrades. It was a pitiful scene; the majority were wounded and every other man carried a weapon. A soldier from the Leibstandarte, passing by, among a group of men, yelled, “We knew you would come and get us out!” In sharp contrast, an Army officer without a weapon yelled, “Why are you idiots prolonging the war?”

Just how sick the troops were, with many types of illnesses, is illustrated by a detailed report about the health condition of the troops of the 16th Panzer Division (III Panzer Corps) right after the breakout. On 8, 9 and 10 April 1944, health inspections were conducted in several units of the 16th Panzer Division by the III Panzer Corps doctor (Korpsarzt). The following picture emerged, in a 10 April 1944 report submitted to the III Panzer Corps:

With very few exceptions, every deployed soldier currently has some sort of physical damage. About 80% of all men have foot damage, ranging from simple soreness to significant purulent inflammation of the lower legs with swelling. About 20% suffer from colds ranging from simple to febrile tracheal catarrh. Around 15% have mild to dysentery-like gastrointestinal catarrh.
The causes of these diseases are:
1.) Continuous deployment under the most primitive sanitary conditions in unfavorable weather, with exposure to mud, snow, wetness and frost.
2.) Significant lice infestation and numerous cases of scabies, which could not be treated due to the uninterrupted deployment or lack of any means of treating scabies.
3.) Lack of any underwear and socks to change, as the men are no longer in possession of their 2nd and 3rd sets. Broken footwear with no possibility of repair.
4.) Irregular, at times one-sided and (due to the location) often impractical rations.
5.) Lack of any possibility to carry out the most primitive personal hygiene, especially also because there is no soap.
6.) Due to the loss of almost all combat vehicles, people lack any toiletries, their mending kit and so on.
In addition, many people experience a high degree of exhaustion as a result of uninterrupted, significant physical exertion.
At present, the efficiency of all infantry units of the division can only be estimated at 50%.
If such stress continues, there is an absolute risk that the state of health will deteriorate significantly in a few days. After that, it is to be expected that the operational readiness will decrease to such an extent that it will no longer be possible to speak of striking power.
Numerous cases with currently mild symptoms will then worsen to such an extent that longer medical treatment and even more hospitalizations will be necessary.

By 1 May 1944, as a result of continuous heavy combat throughout March–April 1944, the personnel strength of the 1st Panzer Army corps' declined tremendously. The huge imbalance between the combat strength (Gefechtsstärke) on one hand and the overall strength on the other, be it ration strength (Verpflegungsstärke) or actual strength (Iststärke), was particularly notable. In response to the request of the command of the 1st Panzer Army to provide information on its strength, the command of the LIX Army Corps submitted its report on 5 May 1944, about its strength at the start of the month. It consisted of the 82nd, 254th, 291st, 371st Infantry Divisions, 20th Panzergrenadier Division, 1st Panzer Division, remnants of the 25th Panzer Division (attached to the 20th Panzergrenadier Division), as well as numerous GHQ units.

Strength of the LIX Army Corps. Status: 1 May 1944.
Category	Strength	Notes
Total actual strength (Iststärke)	56,513	Strength of all divisions, general headquarters (GHQ) combat units (artillery, signals, engineer) and non-combat units (supply troops, administration, veterinarians etc.).
Total combat strength (Gefechtsstärke)	23,882	Strength of all combat units of divisions and GHQ combat units - infantry, engineers, reconnaissance, artillery, anti-tank, panzer troops, signals troops, anti-aircraft etc.
Total trench strength (Grabenstärke)	7,695	Strength of infantry directly deployed in the forward trenches.

The two months of heavy combat and difficult withdrawals in March–April 1944, which included the encirclement and subsequent breakout from the Kamenets–Podolsky pocket, meant that the strength of the 1st Panzer Army had declined signifficantly, with regards to both overall and especially combat strength.

Strength of the 1st Panzer Army between March–May 1944
Date	Strength	Notes
Actual strength (Iststärke) on 1 March 1944	211,545	Several days before the start of the Proskurov-Chernovtsy Offensive. Overall strength of all combat and non-combat personnel.
Actual strength (Iststärke) on 1 May 1944	172,541	Aftermath of the Soviet offensive, including the encirclement and breakout from the Kamenets–Podolsky pocket. Overall strength of all combat and non-combat personnel.
Combat strength (Gefechtsstärke) on 1 May 1944	58,690	Strength of all combat units of the army- infantry, engineers, reconnaissance, artillery, anti-tank, panzer troops, signals troops, anti-aircraft etc.
Trench strength (Grabenstärke) on 1 May 1944	23,998	Strength of army's infantry directly deployed in the forward trenches on the front of 137,200 km.

The tremendous shortages of combat troops and equipment of all sorts, meant that refitting of the 1st Panzer Army would have to be carried out to the summer of 1944. Regarding the measures to increase the combat effectiveness of army divisions, on 6 May 1944 the 1st Panzer Army High Command prepared a total of 16 guidelines, which were to be followed:

The shortages of personnel and materiel, as well as the renewed fighting ahead of the Army, necessitate an immediate reorganization of the existing divisions into permanent operational readiness in their present condition. The supply of personnel and material does not permit complete replenishment of the divisions in the foreseeable future. The refitting is therefore to be completed provisionally by 1 June [1944]. The divisions must be fully operational and mobile with existing strengths by that date.
[...]
In spite of the insufficient replenishment, it is necessary to exhaust all possibilities of increasing the combat power [Kampfkraft] and the mobility by means of auxiliary measures within the divisions. These measures will vary according to the condition of the individual divisions and the available resources.
[...]
The following guidelines are to be followed:
1.) The heavy losses of combat troops inevitably resulted in a disproportion between actual [Iststärke] and combat strength [Gefechtsstärke], between combat troops on the one hand and supply personnel on the other. The goal of all reorganizations must be to increase the number of combatants and to reduce the number of supply personnel and direct aides to the combatant. [...]
10.) Specialists (locksmiths, mechanics, drivers, bakers, butchers and so on) must also be assigned to combat duty in the grenadier regiments if they cannot be used for their actual supply tasks. Hoarding specialists in the rear area in view of the equipment that will be available again later is not justifiable.
15.) A combat strength [Gefechtsstärke] of only 100 men with a ration strength [Verpflegungsstärke] of 1,400 men in the panzer regiment of a panzer division, as has been established, is unacceptable in the current personnel emergency. Where, due to the tank situation, only a small fraction of the soldiers of a panzer regiment are deployed for combat, the remaining soldiers are to be grouped together into alarm units, trained and kept ready for deployment. They are to be included in the combat strength with immediate effect in all strength reports with a corresponding remark.

By the start of June 1944, the condition of the 1st Panzer Army had notably improved, as a result of the stabilization of the front, onset of warm weather and the fact that after 17 April 1944 the Soviet 1st Ukrainian Front went on the defensive. This meant that German forces had an entire month of May to rest and refit, which was urgently needed, given the physically, numerically and materially worn-out state of all divisions of the 1st Panzer Army. Overall, at the start of June 1944, its divisions and army as a whole were fit for defensive operations (Kampfwert III), which was an improvement compared to its condition at the time of the breakout on 5 April 1944, when all of its divisions were fit for limited defensive operations only (Kampfwert IV) or were no longer operational as a whole (Kampfwert V). Nonetheless, going into June 1944, the 1st Panzer Army continued to be hamstrung by major material deficiences, especially in motor vehicles. Similarly, the personnel situation have improved, but its divisions still had on average 25-30% personnel shortages in relation to their authorized strength. The chronic issue remained- shortages of experienced officers and non-commissioned officers. The 1 June 1944 report said:

A.) General:
The structure of army divisions was consolidated during the month [May 1944]. Combat power increased significantly.
There are continuous shortages of combat-experienced officers and non-commissioned officers, which can be remedied only by prolonged utilization of the numerous training facilities.
Mood and spirit of the troops good.
B.) In detail:
Personnel situation substantially improved. Most of the divisions now have over 70% of their authorized strength [Sollstärke].
Larger allocation of motor vehicles still crucial. Previous motor vehicle allocations have increased Army mobility only to 30%.
Large shortages of submachine guns and rifles. Supply of field kitchens and light horse-drawn wagons (due to shortage of motor vehicles) is urgent.
C.) Summary:
The Army is fit for defensive operations. It is only capable of large movements to a limited extent.

== German personnel losses ==
The archival records for the casualties of the 1st and 4th Panzer Armies in March–April 1944 exist, which provide an overall scale of the losses suffered during the Soviet Proskurov-Chernovtsy Operation, including the Kamenets-Podolsky Pocket. The records come mostly from the Armed Forces Casualty Department (Abteilung Wehrmacht-Verlustwesen). These reports are multifaceted and must be understood properly.

One exception is a document prepared by OKH, which indicates the monthly total losses and replacements per army group in the East. The German command called these total losses Abgänge (Departures), which is a sum of dead, missing, evacuated wounded and sick from the area of operations and sent back to Germany (Heimat) for treatment. Thus, in March–April 1944, the combined total losses of both armies, belonging to Army Group North Ukraine (re-designated by April), amounted to 81,888 dead, missing, evacuated wounded and sick. For the same period, a total of 67,800 replacements and convalescents arrived (they were called Zugänge).

The records of Abteilung Wehrmacht-Verlustwesen are divided into two parts. The Heeresarzt ten-day reports show losses of the German armies across all fronts. It is broken down into Dekadenmeldungen (decade reports), showing the casualties suffered by each army for the periods 1–10, 11–20, 21–30 for each month. The ten-day casualty reports were also produced separately by the Armeearzt (Army Doctor) of the 1st and 4th Panzer Armies. These are the main source for losses. They provide the breakdown of losses by divisions and GHQ combat units. There are discrepancies between these army records and Heeresarzt reports. Generally, the army records are more complete, they include complementary reports that arrived at a later date (called Nachmeldungen) and so on.

During catastrophic defeats or chaotic situation, the ten-day reporting system lagged behind by weeks or months. In this regard, a notable issue was the reporting of losses for the 1st Panzer Army. The chaotic conditions resulting from the encirclement meant that regular reporting became impossible. Therefore, there were significant delays in reporting- the reports on army losses for 11 March–10 April 1944 were not brought back into sync until 24 May 1944. These reports do not include the number of evacuated sick, which was large. In the case of the 1st Panzer Army, its also unclear whether all the wounded were counted- for example, the XXIV Panzer Corps reported on 8 April that 1,800 of its wounded personnel are not included in the wounded list.

Another issue was that these reports show losses for ground combat forces only- divisions and GHQ combat units. It does not include paramilitary Wehrmacht Gefolge (Wehrmacht Entourage)- members of Organisation Todt, Reichsbahn, civil workforce, foreign volunteers etc., present with the 1st Panzer Army. The data on their losses is unavailable, but its possible that around one thousand may have been captured, especially during the initial stages of the pocket. In this regard, the Soviet reporting system on the number of prisoners taken did not contain any breakdown to which organization each prisoner belonged to. For example, between 11–31 March 1944, the 38th Army alone reported to have taken 2,890 prisoners, which included members of Feldgendarmerie and security units, members of a separate anti-tank school (Panzerjäger-Schule), Kalmyk legionnaires and members of Vlasov's army (part of the Osttruppen), other miscellaneous units.

The losses of the anti-aircraft units of the Luftwaffe branch are not counted either. The 17. Flak-Division was under subordination of the Luftflotte 4 at the start of March 1944. It was encircled as part of the 1st Panzer Army, suffering heavy personnel and material losses in the pocket. Immediately after the breakout, it was withdrawn to the German-occupied Poland for rebuilding.

What’s remarkable about the reports from both armies is the fact that the number of missing exceed the number of killed. When this happens, it is due to the encirclements, where most of these missing are taken prisoner, the rest are killed, as was the case of the 1st Panzer Army in the Kamenets-Podolsky Pocket, while in the case of the 4th Panzer Army it was the destruction of Tarnopol fortified place and its garrison.

=== 1st Panzer Army ===
The casualty reporting for March–April 1944 was chaotic, delayed and at certain periods incomplete. Therefore, it was not until late May that it was possible to get a clear picture, after the situation had stabilized. Only for 11–30 April period was the casualty reporting stable.

In the army document dated 20 April, it is noted that only a few partial reports are available for 1–10 March, the complete report to be submitted later. Similarly, in the same document it is explicitly stated that only the provisionally calculated casualty figures can be reported for 11 March–10 April, which contain only a part of the losses- the losses for this period were estimated to be 3,400 killed, 13,900 wounded, 4,000 missing.

Subsequently, in the document dated 24 May, when complementary reports arrived and casualties were far higher, this provisional calculation was canceled. Meanwhile, in the document dated 28 May, it is stated that reports for 1–10 March will remain incomplete, because further additions were no longer possible due to the tense combat situation at that time.

Interestingly, there are discrepancies in the Armeearzt and Heeresarzt reports on the losses for 11 March–10 April, as seen in the table. While both of these updated (Nachmeldung) casualty reports were submitted on 24 May 1944 and placed in the period of 11–20 May, the Heeresarzt report shows that army casualties were higher.

Combat losses of the 1st Panzer Army in March–April 1944, based on Armeearzt ten-day reports
Period	Killed	Wounded	Missing	Total	Notes
1–10 March	302	1,173	140	1,615	Report incomplete. Supplementary reports no longer possible to obtain. Submitted on 28 May.
11 March–10 April	4,129	14,943	6,200	25,272	Armeearzt report, submitted on 24 May.
11 March–10 April	5,029	17,743	6,100	28,872	Heeresarzt report for the same period, also submitted on 24 May.
11–20 April	1,521	6,327	418	8,266	
21–30 April	676	2,852	107	3,635	
1 March–30 April	6,628	25,295	6,865	38,788	Based on Armeearzt reports. If the losses for 11 March–10 April are based on Heeresarzt report instead, then the total losses for March–April are 42,388.

In addition to these losses, the 1st Panzer Army High Command reported that about 4,000 of its personnel departed due to sickness (lice infestation, stomach problems, trench foot, frostbite etc.) in April 1944. Exact number of departures due to sickness in the previous month is unavailable.

Thus, the total losses of the 1st Panzer Army, including sick, were at least 45,000. The losses of the civilian-paramilitary Wehrmacht Entourage and Luftwaffe flak units are not included.

=== 4th Panzer Army ===
The casualty reporting of this army was largely stable for March–April 1944, but nonetheless there were several delays. Most notably, the report on losses of Tarnopol fortified place in April, which was lost by 17 April, was not complete until late May and placed into the 1–20 April period.

Combat losses of the 4th Panzer Army in March–April 1944, based on Armeearzt ten-day reports
Period	Killed	Wounded	Missing	Total	Frostbitten	Notes
1–10 March	535	2,214	586	3,335	215	
11–20 March	954	3,447	1,044	5,445	73	
21–31 March	1,241	4,844	1,340	7,425	453 (incl. 5 deaths due to it)	
1–10 April	932	3,614	289	4,835	867	Does not include losses in the Tarnopol fortified place. To be reported later.
11–20 April	474	2,103	151	2,728	363 (incl. 1 death due to it)	Does not include losses in the Tarnopol fortified place. To be reported later.
1–20 April Tarnopol	428	1,320	3,745	5,493	-	Complementary report (Nachmeldung) in late May.
21–30 April	971	2,475	428	3,874	68	
1 March–30 April	5,535	20,017	7,583	33,135	2,039 (incl. 6 deaths due to it)	

In terms of the number of sick, these reports include only those who were frostbitten. Losses due to other illnesses are not included, which were numerous during the two months. For example, in a 25 March report, the army commander, General der Panzertruppen Erhard Raus, noted that non-stop fierce fighting in unfavorable weather conditions resulted in a sharp decline in numerical strength of the troops, due to stomach illnesses, foot problems, frostbite and general physical exhaustion.

=== Hungarian losses ===
The losses of the Hungarian forces in this campaign are not fully known. At the start of the Soviet offensive in early March, only the VII Corps (18th, 21st, 201st Light Divisions, GHQ units) was present. It was under subordination of the 4th Panzer Army and operated in the rear areas, north of the Dniester river.

It became actively engaged in frontline combat from 21 March onwards, after the Soviet 1st Tank Army was introduced to battle and quickly achieved a breakthrough. As a result, the VII Corps was routed, with its units being forced to conduct a hasty retreat south, behind the Dniester, towards Kolomyia and then to Stanislav area (now Ivano-Frankivsk) by the end of the month, where the front had finally stabilized. Total losses of the VII Corps for 21–31 March 1944 are not known, but units of the Soviet 1st Tank Army probably did take at least one thousand Hungarian prisoners, who had to retreat on foot in the mud. For example, on 25 March alone, units of the 8th Guards Mechanized Corps reported capturing 550 Hungarians. The depleted 201st Light Division was disbanded by May 1944. In the first half of April, the intensity of combat in the Stanislav area had decreased, but additional losses were still suffered by the Hungarian units, which are also unknown.

From the start of April 1944, the mobilized Hungarian 1st Army was gradually deployed on the front east and northeast of Carpathians. On 12 April 1944, it was put under the subordination of the German Army Group North Ukraine. The German command gave the 1st Army the mission to go on the counter-offensive, in order to secure the important access routes to the Carpathian passes and to draw off as many Soviet forces as possible. The offensive began on 17 April and lasted until the start of May. Losses of the 1st Army between 17–30 April amounted to 15,571 killed, wounded and missing in total. The 2nd Hungarian Armoured Division lost all of its outdated tanks in the course of this offensive.

== Order of battle for 1st Panzer Army, March 1944 ==
1st Panzer Army (Generaloberst Hans-Valentin Hube)

  - 1st Panzer Division (Generalleutnant Werner Marcks)
  - 17th Panzer Division (Generalleutnant Karl-Friedrich von der Meden)
- III Panzer Corps (General der Panzertruppe Hermann Breith)
  - 16th Panzer Division (Generalmajor Hans-Ulrich Back)
  - 11th Panzer Division (Generalleutnant Wend von Wietersheim)
  - Kampfgruppe from 1st SS Panzer Division Leibstandarte SS Adolf Hitler
  - 249th StuG Brigade
  - Heavy Tank Regiment Bäke (Oberst Franz Bäke)
  - 509th Heavy Panzer Battalion (Oberleutnant Dr. König)
- LIX Army Corps (General der Infanterie Kurt von der Chevallerie)
  - 96th Infantry Division (Generalleutnant Richard Wirtz)
  - 291st Infantry Division (Generalmajor Oskar Eckholt)
  - 6th Panzer Division (Generalleutnant Walter Denkert)
  - 19th Panzer Division (Generalleutnant Hans Källner)
  - 2nd SS Panzer Division Das Reich - Kampfgruppe (SS-Sturmbannführer Otto Weidinger)
  - 276th StuG Brigade
  - 280th StuG Brigade
  - 616th Heavy Panzerjäger Battalion
  - 88th Heavy Panzerjäger Battalion
  - 509th Heavy Panzerjäger Battalion
- XXIV Panzer Corps (General der Panzertruppen Walther Nehring)
  - 25th Panzer Division (remnants) (Generalleutnant Hans Tröger)
  - 20th Panzergrenadier Division (General der Panzertruppen Georg Jauer)
  - 168th Infantry Division (Generalleutnant Werner Schmidt-Hammer)
  - 208th Infantry Division (Generalleutnant Heinz Piekenbrock)
  - 371st Infantry Division (General der Infanterie Hermann Niehoff)
  - 300th StuG Brigade
  - 731st Heavy Panzerjäger Battalion
  - 473rd Motorcycle Battalion
- XXXXVI Panzer Corps (General der Infanterie Friedrich Schulz)
  - 1st Infantry Division (Generalleutnant Ernst-Anton von Krosigk)
  - 82nd Infantry Division (Generalleutnant Hans-Walter Heyne)
  - 75th Infantry Division (Generalleutnant Helmuth Beukemann)
  - 254th Infantry Division (Generalleutnant Alfred Thielmann)
  - 101st Jäger Division (General der Gebirgstruppen Emil Vogel)
  - 18th Artillery Division (General der Artillerie Karl Thoholte)
  - 300th StuG Battalion
