= III Army Corps (Wehrmacht) =

- III. Armeekorps
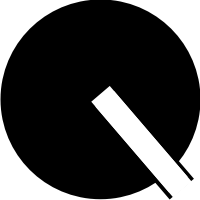
- III. Panzerkorps
- Active: October 1934 – 8 May 1945
- Country: Nazi Germany
- Branch: Army
- Type: Panzer corps
- Role: Armoured warfare
- Size: Corps
- Engagements: World War II: Kamenets-Podolsky pocket

Commanders
- Notable commanders: Hermann Breith; Eberhard von Mackensen; Leo Freiherr Geyr von Schweppenburg

III Army Corps was a corps level formation of the German Army during World War II.

== III Army Corps ==
The III Corps was formed in October 1934 as III. Armeekorps. The corps took part in Fall Weiss, the 1939 invasion of Poland as a part of Army Group North. It then took part in Fall Gelb as a part of Army Group A, participating in the assault through the Ardennes. In March 1941, the corps was upgraded to a motorised corps status and redesignated III Armeekorps (mot). The Corps was attached to Army Group South for Operation Barbarossa, the invasion of the Soviet Union. The corps advanced through Ukraine and took part in the Battle of Brody, Battle of Kiev, Battle of Rostov, Battle of Kharkov and Battle of Uman.

== III Panzer Corps ==
III Panzer Corps was formed in June 1942 from III Army Corps and attached to Army Group A, the formation tasked with capturing the Caucasus as a part of Fall Blau.

In mid-1943, following the loss of the 6th Army at the Battle of Stalingrad, III Panzer Corps took part in the battles around Kharkov as part of Army Group Don. During Operation Citadel, the Corps was the striking force of Army Detachment Kempf as they attempted to protect the right flank of the 4th Panzer Army. It also took part in Operation Roland, and was involved in the retreat from Belgorod to the Dniepr.

At the beginning of 1944, the Corps participated in the relief of the forces trapped in the Korsun-Cherkassy Pocket. In March the Corps was encircled in the Kamenets-Podolsky pocket, along with the rest of the 1st Panzer Army. III Corps drove the breakout and escape. Due to heavy losses, from November 1944 to January 1945, the corps was redesignated as Gruppe Breith, after its commander Hermann Breith.

In late 1944, III Panzerkorps participated in Operation Konrad, the failed attempts to relieve the German and Hungarian garrison at Budapest. The corps then took part in Operation Spring Awakening in Hungary. After its failure, the corps retreated through Austria, surrendering to the U.S. Army on 8 May 1945.

== Noteworthy individuals ==
=== Commanders ===
- Curt Haase (1 Sep 1939 - 13 Nov 1940)
- Kurt von Greiff (13 Nov 1940 - 15 Jan 1941)
- Eberhard von Mackensen (15 Jan 1941 - 31 Mar 1942)
- Leo Freiherr Geyr von Schweppenburg (31 Mar 1942 - 20 July 1942)
- Eberhard von Mackensen (20 July 1942 - 2 Jan 1943)
- Hermann Breith (2 Jan 1943 - 20 Oct 1943)
- Heinz Ziegler (20 Oct 1943 - 25 Nov 1943)
- Friedrich Schulz (25 Nov 1943 - 9 Jan 1944)
- Hermann Breith (9 Jan 1944 - 31 May 1944)
- Dietrich von Saucken (31 May 1944 - 29 June 1944)
- Hermann Breith (29 June 1944 - 8 May 1945)

=== Others ===
- Friedrich Foertsch, member of the general staff of III Army Corps 1938–39; later Inspector General of the Bundeswehr 1961–63.

== Orders Of Battle ==
III.Armeekorps, May 1940 - Fall Gelb

- Stab der Korps
  - Arko 3
  - Korps-Nachrichten-Abteilung 43
  - Korps-Nachschubtruppen 403
  - Feldgendarmerie-Trupp 403
- 3. Infanterie Division
- 23. Infanterie Division
- 52. Infanterie Division

III.Armeekorps (mot), September 1941 - Operation Barbarossa

- Stab der Korps
  - Arko 3
  - Korps-Nachrichten-Abteilung 43
  - Korps-Nachschubtruppen 403
  - Feldgendarmerie-Trupp 403
- 14.Panzer Division
- 60.Infanterie Division (mot)
- 13.Panzer Division
- SS-Division Wiking
- 198.Infanterie Division

III.Panzerkorps, July 1943 - Operation Citadel

- Corps Troops (Stab der Korps)
  - Artillery Commander 3 (Arko 3)
  - 43rd Panzer Signal Battalion
  - Korps-Nachrichten-Abteilung 43
  - Korps-Nachschubtruppen 403
  - Feldgendarmerie-Trupp 403
- Corps attached units
  - Sturmgeschütz-Abteilung 228
  - Sturmgeschütz-Abteilung 905
  - Sturmgeschütz-Batterie 393
  - schwere-Panzer-Abteilung 503
- 6.Panzer-Division under Major General Walther von Hünersdorff
  - 11.Panzer-Regiment (with 86 tanks)
  - 4.Panzergrenadier-Regiment
  - 114.Panzergrenadier-Regiment
  - 76.Panzerartillerie-Regiment
- 7.Panzer-Division under Lieutenant General Hans Freiherr von Funck
  - 25.Panzer-Regiment (with 87 tanks)
  - 6.Panzergrenadier-Regiment
  - 7.Panzergrenadier-Regiment
  - 78.Panzerartillerie-Regiment
- 19.Panzer-Division under Lieutenant General Gustav Schmidt
  - 27.Panzer-Regiment (with 70 tanks)
  - 73.Panzergrenadier-Regiment
  - 74.Panzergrenadier-Regiment
  - 19.Panzerartillerie-Regiment
- 168.Infanterie-Division under Major General Walter Chales de Beaulieu
  - 417.Infanterie-Regiment
  - 429.Infanterie-Regiment
  - 442.Infanterie-Regiment
  - 248.Artillerie-Regiment

III Panzerkorps, March 1944 - Korsun-Cherkassy Pocket

- Stab der Korps
  - Arko 3
  - Korps-Nachrichten-Abteilung 43
  - Korps-Nachschubtruppen 403
  - Feldgendarmerie-Trupp 403
- 1.Panzer Division
- 16.Panzer Division
- 17.Panzer Division
- 1.SS Panzer Division Leibstandate SS Adolf Hitler
- schwere Panzer Abteilung 503

III Panzerkorps, March 1945 - Operation Spring Awakening

- Stab der Korps
  - Arko 3
  - Korps-Nachrichten-Abteilung 43
  - Korps-Nachschubtruppen 403
  - Feldgendarmerie-Trupp 403
  - schwere-Panzer-Abteilung 509
- 3.Panzer Division
- 1.Panzer Division
- 23.Panzer Division

== See also ==
- Panzer, Panzer Division
- Corps, Military unit
- Wehrmacht, List of German military units of World War II
