= Großdeutschland (disambiguation) =

Pan-Germanism is a pan-nationalist political idea.

Großdeutschland can also refer to:

- Kleindeutschland (Lesser Germany) and Großdeutschland (Greater Germany), two competing ideas for unifying German-speaking lands in the 19th century
  - Großdeutschland, the name informally adopted by Nazi Germany after annexing Austria in March 1938.
  - Großdeutsches Reich, Nazi Germany's official state name from 1943 to 1945.
- Infantry Regiment Großdeutschland, a German Army formation in World War II
  - Panzer-Grenadier-Division Großdeutschland, a mechanized infantry / armor division created from the Infantry Regiment in 1942.
  - Panzerkorps Großdeutschland, a panzer corps created with elements from the Grenadier Division and others in 1944.
- Magna Germania (Latin: Greater Germania), the Roman term for the region east of the Rhine River.

== See also ==
- Anschluss
- Greater German Reich (disambiguation)
