= Panzerkorps Großdeutschland =

- Active: 28 September 1944 – 8 May 1945
- Country: Nazi Germany
- Branch: Army
- Type: Panzer
- Role: Armoured warfare
- Size: Corps
- Engagements: World War II: Vistula–Oder Offensive

Commanders
- Notable commanders: General Dietrich von Saucken; General Georg Jauer

The Panzerkorps Großdeutschland was a German panzer corps in the Wehrmacht which saw action on the Eastern Front in 1944/1945 during World War II.

== Creation and service history ==
On September 28, 1944 the OKH ordered the creation of Panzer Corps Grossdeutschland. It was planned to contain enlarged corps troops and several panzer divisions; a unit that could be used as strong reserve for an army. To achieve this, parts of the Panzer-Grenadier-Division Großdeutschland were, while the division retained its status, used as base for the Generalkommando Panzerkorps Großdeutschland.

Units for the staff and the corps troops were:

- Remnants of the (dissolved) 18th Artillery Division
  - Artillerie-Division-Stab 18 (Division Staff)
  - Divisions-Nachrichten-Abteilung 88 (Signals Battalion 88)
  - Div.Nachschubtruppen 88 (Division Supply Troops 88)
- Remnants of the (dissolved) XIII Army Corps
- Elements of the Panzer-Grenadier-Division Großdeutschland
  - III., Grenadier Regiment Großdeutschland
- Elements of the Panzer-Grenadier-Division Brandenburg
  - III., Jäger(mot) Regiment 1 Brandenburg
- Elements of the Wehrkreiskommando I (command personnel of military district, Wehrkreis I)
- Feldpostamt z.b.V. 605 (Field Post Office z.b.V. [for special purpose] 605)

With the addition of the Panzer-Grenadier-Division Brandenburg the corps had its first structure with two active divisions. The first commander of the corps was General der Panzertruppe Dietrich von Saucken, the former commander of the XXXIX Panzer Corps.

Still in the forming phase during the looming of the Soviet Vistula–Oder Offensive the staff and the Brandenburg Division were ordered to Poland, while the Division Großdeutschland was detached to Eastern Prussia. Ultimately the corps never fought as a unified body, and during the retreat towards the west its composition steadily changed. When von Saucken was promoted to command the 2nd Army in February he was succeeded by General der Panzertruppe Georg Jauer, who commanded the corps's 20. Panzer-Grenadier-Division. Never surrendering at-large the corps was dismissed on war's end on May 8, 1945.

== Order of Battle – March 1, 1945 ==
=== Staff Panzercorps Großdeutschland ===
==== Corps Troops ====
- Heavy Panzer Battalion Großdeutschland
- Corps Fusilier Regiment Großdeutschland
  - I. Fusilier (Bicycle) Btln.
  - II. Fusilier (Bicycle) Btln.
  - Regimental Support Company (mot)
- Panzer Field-Replacement Rgt. Großdeutschland
- 44th Panzer Signals Battalion
- 500th Artillery Brigade Staff
  - Observation Battery (mot)
  - 500th Panzer Artillery Regiment (I. & II. Btln.)
- 500th Pioneer Regimental Staff (mot)
- 500th Panzer Pioneer Btln.
- 500th Reconnaissance Company (half-track)
- 500th Staff Escort Company
- 500th Sound Ranging Platoon (mot)
- 500th Mapping Detachment (mot)
- 500th Military Police Detachment
- 500th Supply Regiment (mot)

=== Division z.b.V. 615 / Divisions-Stab z.b.V. 615 ===
Generalmajor Gerd-Paul von Below

- Division Staff z.b.V. 615
- 687th Pioneer Brigade
- 3093rd Fortress Machine-Gun Btln.
- 3094th Fortress Machine-Gun Btln.
- 3095th Fortress Machine-Gun Btln.
- 1485th Fortress Infantry Btln.
- Infantry Battalion z.b.V. 500

=== Fallschirm-Panzer Division 1 Hermann Göring ===
Generalmajor Max Lemke

- Division Staff
- Fallschirm-Panzergrenadier Regiment 1 Hermann Göring (I. & II. Btln.)
- Fallschirm-Panzergrenadier Regiment 2 Hermann Göring (I. & II. Btln.)
- Fallschirm-Panzer Regiment Hermann Göring (I., II. & III. Btln.)
- Fallschirm-Panzer Artillery Regiment 1 Hermann Göring (I., II. & III. Btln.)
- Fallschirm-Panzer Fusilier Btln. 1 Hermann Göring
- Fallschirm-Panzer Reconnaissance Btln. 1 Hermann Göring
- Fallschirm-Panzer Pioneer Btln. 1 Hermann Göring
- Fallschirm-Panzer Signals Btln. 1 Hermann Göring
- Fallschirm-Panzer Field-Replacement Btln. 1 Hermann Göring
- Military Police Detachment
- Field Post Office 1 Hermann Göring
- Supply Detachment 1 Hermann Göring

=== Panzer-Grenadier-Division Brandenburg ===
Generalmajor Hermann Schulte-Heuthaus

- Division Staff Brandenburg
- Jäger(mot) Regiment 1 Brandenburg (I. & II. Btln.)
- Jäger(mot) Regiment 2 Brandenburg (I. & II. Btln.)
- Panzer Regiment Brandenburg
  - I. Panzer Btln. (detached)
  - II. Panzer Btln.
- Tank Destroyer Btln. Brandenburg
- Armoured Artillery Regiment Brandenburg (I., II. & III. Btln.)
- Armoured Flak Artillery Btln. Brandenburg
- Armoured Reconnaissance Btln. Brandenburg
- Panzer Pioneer Btln. Brandenburg
- Panzer Signals Btln. Brandenburg
- Field-Replacement Btln. Brandenburg
- Supply Regiment Brandenburg

=== 20. Panzer-Grenadier-Division ===
Generalmajor Georg Scholze

- Division Staff
- 76th Panzer-Grenadier Regiment (I., II. & III. Btln.)
- 90th Panzer-Grenadier Regiment (I., II. & III. Btln.)
- 8th Panzer Btln.
- 20th Artillery Regiment (I., II. & III. Btln.)
- 284th/285th Flak Artillery Btln.
- 120th Armoured Reconnaissance Btln.
- 20th Anti-Tank Btln.
- 20th Field-Replacement Btln.
- 20th Armoured Signals Btln.
- 20th Supply Regiment

== Commanders ==
- General Dietrich von Saucken (1944 – February 11, 1945)
- General Georg Jauer (February 12, 1945 – May 8, 1945)
