= Panzerkeil =

Tactic used by Nazi armoured troops

The Panzerkeil ("armoured wedge" or "tank wedge") was an offensive armoured tactic developed by German Kampfgruppe (battle groups) on the Eastern Front during World War II. The Panzerkeil was developed in response to the Soviet employment of the Pakfront anti-tank gun defence.

== Usage ==
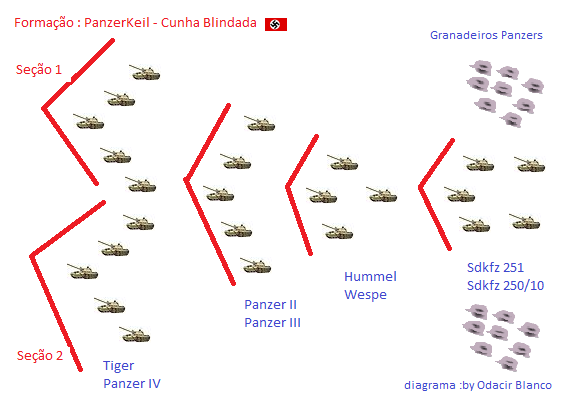
The Panzerkeil - Offensive Tactics Diagram

The Panzerkeil was an offensive formation used by armoured vehicles, most commonly tanks, supported by Panzergrenadier mechanised infantry and aircraft. The tanks would form into a wedge-shaped formation, with the most heavily armed and armoured vehicles forming the tip. At the Battle of Kursk, Tiger I heavy tanks would form the tip, Panther medium tanks (where available) the base, with Panzer IV and Panzer III medium tanks forming the wings.

The advantage of the Panzerkeil was that the anti-tank gunners of the opposing Pakfront would be forced to constantly adjust their ranges due to the depth of the formation. Also, the heavily armoured Tigers and Panthers would bear the brunt of the anti-tank fire, leaving the more vulnerable tanks safe from enemy fire.

The Panzerkeil achieved mixed results. During the German offensive, Operation Citadel, that began the battle of Kursk the Panzerkeil enabled the spearheads of Generaloberst Hermann Hoth's 4th Panzer Army to break through the elaborate Soviet defences. Meanwhile, in Generalfeldmarschall Walter Model's 9th Army sector, tank units using the Panzerkeil tactic failed to achieve a breakthrough, and suffered heavy losses due to anti-tank fire.

There is also some contention that this formation was rarely used during Operation Citadel due to the scarcity of Tigers and most Panthers being assigned to the Großdeutschland Division. Furthermore, Pioniere (combat engineers) had to lead formations to clear mines lest the Tigers be immobilized by anti-tank mines, as the Kursk salient was heavily mined.

== Panzerglocke ==
An evolution of the Panzerkeil was the "Panzerglocke" which was a bell-shaped offensive formation whereby armored engineers would follow the leading heavier tanks (Tigers and/or Panthers), lighter tanks on the flanks and a command group to direct the formation and supporting close-air support. This sometimes was employed with the heavier panzers being surrounded by lighter panzers, the heavier panzers forming the "clapper" of the bell-shaped formation.

== See also ==
- Flying wedge
- Armoured spearhead

== Sources ==
- Wolfgang Schneider: Panzertaktik - Deutsche Einsatzgrundsätze 1935 bis heute. Armour Research 2008, ISBN 3-935107-12-9
- Rudolf Steiger: Panzertaktik im Spiegel deutscher Kriegstagebücher 1939-1941. Verlag Rombach (1973), ISBN 3-7930-0171-7
- Oskar Munzel: Panzer-Taktik. Vowinckel Verlag (1959)
- Dennis Showalter: Blood and Iron: the Battle of Kursk, the turning point of World War II. New York, Random House, 2013
