= Hermann Breith =

German general

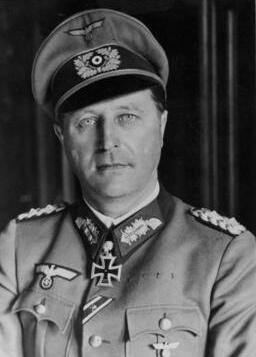
- Born: 7 May 1892; Pirmasens, German Empire
- Died: 3 September 1964 (aged 72); Pech district of Wachtberg, West Germany
- Military career
- Allegiance: German Empire; Weimar Republic; Nazi Germany
- Branch: German Army
- Service years: 1910–1945
- Rank: General der Panzertruppe
- Commands: III Panzer Corps
- Conflicts: World War I World War II
- Awards: Knight's Cross of the Iron Cross with Oak Leaves and Swords

Hermann Albert Breith (7 May 1892 – 3 September 1964) was a German general during World War II. He was a recipient of the Knight's Cross of the Iron Cross with Oak Leaves and Swords of Nazi Germany. Breith commanded the III Army Corps.

== Awards ==
- Iron Cross (1914) 2nd Class (10 September 1914) & 1st Class (30 July 1916)
- Knight's Cross of the Royal House Order of Hohenzollern with Swords (28 October 1918)
- Hanseatic Cross of Hamburg (16 April 1917)
- Wehrmacht Long Service Award 1st Class (2 October 1936)
- Clasp to the Iron Cross (1939) 2nd Class (23 September 1939) & 1st Class (2 October 1939)
- Wound Badge in Black (1 June 1940)
- Panzer Badge in Silver (20 May 1940)
- Knight's Cross of the Iron Cross with Oak Leaves and Swords
  - Knight's Cross on 3 June 1940 as Oberst and commander of the 5. Panzer-Brigade
  - 69th Oak Leaves on 31 January 1942 as Generalmajor and commander of the 3. Panzer-Division
  - 48th Swords on 21 February 1944 as General der Panzertruppe and commanding general of the III. Panzer-Korps

Military offices
Preceded by Generalfeldmarschall Walter Model	Commander of 3. Panzer-Division; 2 October 1941 – 1 October 1942	Succeeded by Generalleutnant Franz Westhoven
Preceded by Generaloberst Eberhard von Mackensen	Commander of III Corps; 2 January 1943 – 20 October 1943	Succeeded by General der Artillerie Heinz Ziegler
Preceded by General der Infanterie Friedrich Schulz	Commander of III Corps; 9 January 1944 – 31 May 1944	Succeeded by General der Panzertruppe Dietrich von Saucken
Preceded by General der Panzertruppe Dietrich von Saucken	Commander of III Corps; 29 June 1944 – 8 May 1945	Succeeded by none
