= Hans Tröger =

WW2 German Army general (1896-1982)

- Born: 29 August 1896; Plauen, Kingdom of Saxony, German Empire
- Died: 21 January 1982 (aged 85); Schwangau, Bavaria, West Germany
- Military career
- Allegiance: German Empire (to 1918); Weimar Republic (to 1933); Nazi Germany
- Branch: Army
- Service years: 1915–1944
- Rank: Generalleutnant
- Commands: 27th Panzer Division; 25th Panzer Division; 13th Panzer Division
- Conflicts: World War I World War II: Invasion of Poland; Battle of France; Balkan Campaign; Operation Barbarossa; Battle of Rostov (1941); Battle of the Caucasus; Hube's Pocket; First Jassy-Kishinev Offensive; Second Jassy-Kishinev Offensive
- Awards: Knight's Cross of the Iron Cross

Hans Tröger (29 August 1896 – 21 January 1982) was a German general in the Wehrmacht during World War II who commanded several panzer divisions. He was a recipient of the Knight's Cross of the Iron Cross, awarded by Nazi Germany to recognise successful military leadership.

== Biography ==
Born in 1896, Tröger entered the army of Imperial Germany in 1915 as a Fahnenjunker (officer cadet) and served as an engineer. After World War I, he remained in the military, serving in the Reichsheer. From 1935 he was in the Wehrmacht and was posted to the Office of Mobile Troops at the Oberkommando der Wehrmacht (Armed Forces High Command), commonly known as OKW, for two years from 1938. Following the outbreak of World War II, he commanded of the 64th Motorcycle Battalion and then the 103rd Rifle Regiment. On 30 November 1942, he was appointed commander of the 27th Panzer Division, which at the time engaged in fighting as it retreated from the Donets. In early 1943 he left the Eastern Front to take up an appointment as commander of the School for Panzer Troops, based in Germany.

He returned to divisional command when posted to the 25th Panzer Division on 20 November 1943. His new command was fighting on the Eastern Front around Kiev, in which it suffered heavy losses and further, significant, casualties were incurred in the retreat across Ukraine. In April 1944, it was transferred to Denmark for a refit and Tröger, promoted to generalleutnant (Note: The rank of generalleutnant is equivalent to that of major general in the United States Army.) earlier that month, took over command of the 13th Panzer Division. In September, the division took part in the fighting around Kishinev but found itself cut off. It had to break out and while some personnel made it to the German lines, Tröger led one element into Bulgaria and was captured by Bulgarian troops. After a period of internment, he was later handed over to the Soviet Union. He remained a prisoner of war until 1955.

== Awards and decorations ==
- Iron Cross (1914) 2nd Class & 1st Class
- Iron Cross (1939) 2nd Class & 1st Class
- German Cross in Gold (15 November 1941)
- Knight's Cross of the Iron Cross on 4 May 1944 as generalmajor and commander of 25th Panzer Division

== Notes ==
Footnotes

Citations

Military offices
Preceded by Oberst Helmut Michalik	Commander of 27th Panzer Division; 30 November 1942 – 26 January 1943	Succeeded by Oberst Joachim von Kronhelm
Preceded by General der Panzertruppe Georg Jauer	Commander of 25th Panzer Division; 20 November 1943 – 10 May 1944	Succeeded by Generalmajor Oswin Grolig
Preceded by Oberst Friedrich-Erdmann von Hake	Commander of 13th Panzer Division; 25 May 1944 – 9 September 1944	Succeeded by Generalmajor Gerhard Schmidhuber
