= 25th Panzer Division =

German army division during World War II

- German: 25. Panzer-Division
- Unit insignia
- Active: 1942–45
- Country: Germany
- Branch: Army
- Type: Panzer
- Role: Armoured warfare
- Size: Division
- Nickname: "Mondschein" ('Moonshine')
- Engagements: World War II

Commanders
- Notable commanders: Georg Jauer

The 25th Panzer Division (German: 25. Panzer-Division) was a tank formation of the German Army during World War II. It was one of several understrength Panzer divisions formed during the last years of the war.

== History ==
=== Formation ===
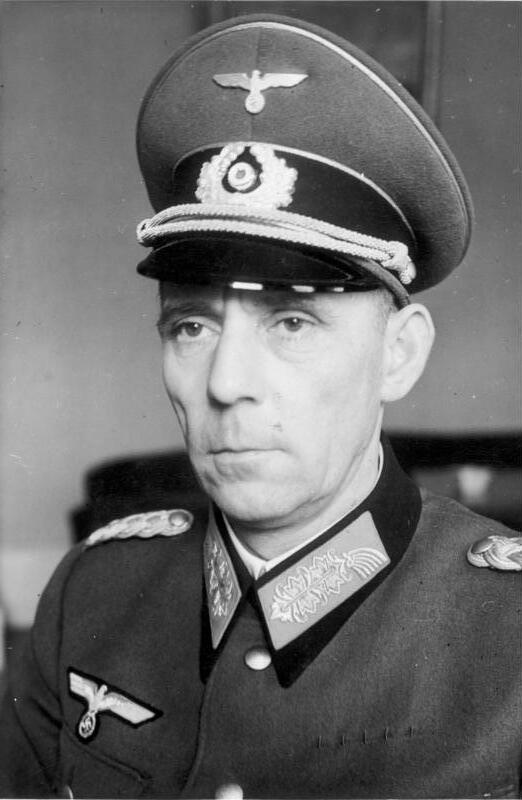
Adolf von Schell 1 January 1943 – 15 November 1943

The 25th Panzer Division was formed in Norway on 15 May 1941 as the 'Schützenverband Oslo', It was created to spearhead the possible invasion of Sweden and a full Panzer Division was not considered necessary for this task. When the Russian campaign did not end in 1941 as planned, the Verband was re-designated the 25th Panzer Division on 25 February 1942, although there was little increased strength to the original numbers of the Verband. Divisional staff were formed in Eberswalde Germany, (their new home station) and arrived in Oslo, Norway on 5 March. Existing units were renamed, and new ones formed in order to get the new division to actual divisional strength, although it remained well under even when it moved to France in September 1943. Soon after its creation in February, the division engaged with Norwegian Partisans near Rjukan, and then in late August sailed to Denmark to take part in Operation Tivoliasflug, the disarming of the Danish Army. After being transferred to Northern France in September/October for training exercises, the division was sent east, and eventually arrived on the Eastern front (central sector) in early November 1943.

=== Eastern Front ===
In October 1943, the division was transferred to the Eastern Front and was attached to the 4th Panzer Army under Army Group North Ukraine. Generalleutnant Adolph von Schell was originally supposed to have been replaced by Generalleutnant Georg Jauer, but Jauer could not be replaced as commander of 20th Panzergrenadier Division in time. Schell remained in command despite Guderian's attempt to persuade him to step down. Generalleutnant Hans Tröger was the next choice for commander, but he would not reach the division until 20 November. The division arrived on the Ukrainian Front on 8 November. At that time, the 4th Panzer Army was in serious trouble due to Soviet attacks which had captured Kiev and the Red Army was in a position to encircle the whole 4th Panzer Army. Being thrown straight into the battle by the High Command, the 25th Panzer Division drove forward but was halted by the advancing Soviet 7th Guards Tank Corps that had just captured Zhitomir.

As the month went on, the situation changed with the arrival of the elite 1st SS Division, along with the 1st and 7th Panzer Divisions, under the command of 48th Panzer Corps (who also commanded the 25th). These were battle hardened, full-strength units that drove north then west to retake Zhitomir where the 25th became involved in heavy fighting. To counter this assault, the Russians attacked with the 7th Guards Tank Corps and a huge tank battle ensued, although not on the same scale seen at Kursk a few months previously. The heavy fighting continued until the end of November, when mud halted all operations.

Although suffering heavy losses, largely due to inexperience, the division had played a significant role in halting a major Soviet advance east of Fastov (southwest of Kiev), as well as participating in the counterattacks against the Kiev Salient.

On 20 November 1943, the 25th Panzer Division possessed 63 tanks, though the percentage of operationality is unclear.

At the start of the new year in 1944, the division had lost all offensive capabilities; in the following months, the retreat across Ukraine left the division with only 8,000 men when it was encircled with the 1st Panzer Army in Hube's Pocket and was almost completely destroyed.

=== Refitting and further fighting on the Eastern Front ===
In April 1944, the division was sent to Aalborg in Denmark to rebuild and where they absorbed the main forces of Panzer Division Norway as much needed reinforcements. By now, the hard-pressed Wehrmacht, which were now fighting on two fronts, was only able to raise a skeleton Panzer division. In September 1944, the situation was so bad on the Eastern front that although completely under strength, the division was sent again to battle the Red Army at the Vistula crossings in Poland and in the defense of Warsaw, also parts of it were involved in the suppression of the Warsaw Uprising. On 6 November 1944, after months of bitter fighting, the division was finally reinforced once more. Remnants of other brigades and battalions were absorbed, along with 25 Panther tanks, a type that was in particularly short supply.

On 1 January 1945, the division (then under 9th Army of Army Group A) had a strength of 13,076 men.

In January 1945, after the defense of Warsaw, the division could only field a total of around 68 tanks, assault and self-propelled anti-aircraft guns: 5 Panzer IV, 15 Panzer IV/70, 21 Jagdpanzer IV/48, 23 Panther tanks and 4 Flakpanzer IV. The 25th and 19th Panzer Divisions counterattacked strongly, but were ultimately ineffective and were forced to retreat to the Oder River. By the end of January, the division had lost 622 men killed, 2,318 wounded, and 6,030 missing, a total of 8,970 casualties in only six weeks.

=== Last months of the war ===
After the retreat to the Oder River in January 1945, the division lost nearly all its tanks and had suffered irreplaceable losses. In April, it was transferred to Vienna in Austria, then posted north of the Danube river to protect the Austrian oil fields. By this time it could no longer be classed as a viable fighting force. Down to 45 operational Panzers, with manpower falling rapidly every day, the division reluctantly fought on at Prottes, Hohenruppersdorf, Martinsdorf, and Schrick, eventually ending the war in Austria. Alongside the 11th Panzer Division, the 25th surrendered to the advancing Americans.

=== Equipment ===
The quality of the equipment was mixed since the division was issued with outdated French tanks, such as the Renault R35, Hotchkiss H39 and Char B1 and different models of the panzer tanks. The artillery regiment had modern artillery pieces, but was the size of a battalion and so could only give limited fire support. The reconnaissance battalion had no armoured cars, it was made up entirely of motorcycles. At its height in the summer of 1943, the division stood at a strength of 21,000 men and fielded 14 Panzer II tanks, 62 Panzer IIIs, 26 Panzer IVs, 40 Hotchkiss H39, 15 Somua S35, and 15 self-propelled assault guns such as the StuG III.

== Commanding officers ==
- Generalleutnant Johann Haarde, 25 February 1942
- Generalleutnant Adolf von Schell, 1 January 1943
- Generalleutnant Hans Tröger, 20 November 1943 – 10 May 1944
- Generalmajor Oswin Grolig, 1 June 1944
- Generalmajor Oskar Audörsch, 18 August 1944 – May 1945

== Order of battle, April 1943, Ukraine ==
- Panzer Regiment 9
- Panzer Grenadier Regiment 146
- Panzer Grenadier Regiment 147
- Panzer Artillery Regiment 91 (undersized)
- Panzer Reconnaissance Battalion 25
- Motorcycle Battalion 8
- Panzerjäger Battalion 87 (Tank Destroyer Battalion)
- Panzer Engineer Battalion 87
- Panzer Signal Battalion 87
- Panzer Pioneer Battalion 87
- Feldersatz Battalion (Field Replacement Battalion)

== See also ==
- Battle of Kiev (1943)
- List of German divisions in World War II
- Organisation of a SS Panzer Division
- Panzer division
