= 27th Panzer Division =

German army division during World War II

German 27th Panzer Division
- Unit insignia
- Active: October 1942 – March 1943
- Country: Germany
- Branch: Army
- Type: Panzer
- Role: Armoured warfare
- Size: Division
- Engagements: World War II

The 27th Panzer Division was an incomplete armoured (Panzer) division of the German Wehrmacht during World War II. It began forming in the southern sector of the Eastern Front in late 1942, but was never completed due to the loss of its assets during the Soviet counteroffensives in the Battle of Stalingrad, and no further attempts were made to reconstitute the division.

== Operational history ==
During summer-autumn 1942, part of the division was formed in France, including the division's artillery regiment. Meanwhile, in the Eastern Front, the Brigade Michalik (led by Colonel Helmut Michalik) was formed around the 140th Panzer Grenadier Regiment (which was previously part of 22nd Panzer Division).

In autumn 1942, the two echelons joined in Voronezh, situated then in the rear area of the German 2nd Army, and the division was formally activated on 1 October 1942. With about 3,000 men its strength was well under that required for a Panzer Division; however the situation required that it had to be scattered in several groups to support different sectors of the Eastern Front: Don, south of Kharkov, Hungarian 2nd Army, Italian 8th Army. Twenty tanks were incorporated into the German 2nd Army Headquarters. The 127th Pz.Eng.Batt. never joined the rest of the division, as it was one of the units encircled at Stalingrad, where it was destroyed.

By 1 January 1943, the unit was depleted: it had only half of its mechanised infantry and 11 tanks left. The estimated total strength was less than 1,600 men by 8 February. Once the Soviet winter offensive, Operation Little Saturn, was stopped, the 27th Panzer was disbanded around 3 March 1943. The personnel of the 127th Panzer and 127th Panzer Signals Battalions were assigned to the 24th Panzer Division in France, while the remaining men and materiel were incorporated into the 7th Panzer Division in Russia.

== Commanding officers ==
- Oberst Helmut Michalik (Creation - 29 November 1942)
- Oberst Hans Tröger (30 November 1942 - 26 January 1943)
- Oberst Joachim von Kronhelm (26 January 1943 - Disbanded)

== Order of battle ==
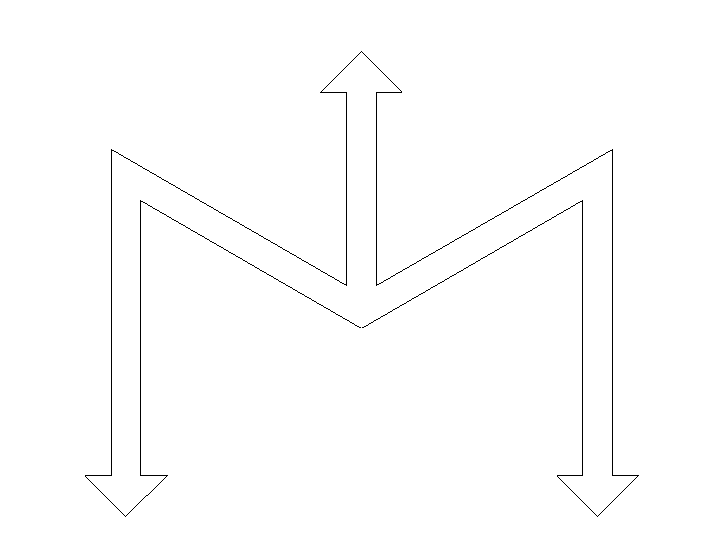
Alternate tactical sign of the 27th Panzer Division

As of 20 September 1942, the following units were assigned to the division:

- Panzer-Grenadier-Regiment 140
- Panzerjäger-Abteilung 127
- Panzer-Abteilung 127
- Panzer-Artillerie-Regiment 127
- Panzer-Pionier-Bataillon 127
- Panzer-Nachrichten-Kompanie 127

By 1943, it also included:

- Panzer-Aufklärungs-Abteilung 27
- Versorgungstruppen 127
