= Erich Jaschke =

WW2 German Army general (1890-1961)

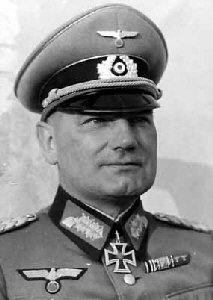
- Born: 11 May 1890; Danzig, West Prussia
- Died: 18 October 1961 (aged 71); Hamburg, Germany
- Military career
- Allegiance: German Empire; Weimar Republic; Nazi Germany
- Branch: Army
- Service years: 1909–1945
- Rank: General of the Infantry
- Commands: 20th Infantry Division; LV. Armeekorps
- Conflicts: World War II
- Awards: Knight's Cross of the Iron Cross with Oak Leaves

Erich Jaschke (11 May 1890 – 18 October 1961) was a general in the Wehrmacht of Nazi Germany during World War II who commanded the 20th Infantry Division and late the LV. Army Corps. He was a recipient of the Knight's Cross of the Iron Cross with Oak Leaves.

== Awards and decorations ==
- Iron Cross (1914) 2nd Class (5 November 1914) & 1st Class (5 April 1915)
- Honour Cross of the World War 1914/1918
- Clasp to the Iron Cross (1939) 2nd Class (31 May 1940) & 1st Class (8 July 1941)
- Knight's Cross of the Iron Cross with Oak Leaves
  - Knight's Cross on 4 December 1941 as Oberst and commander of Infanterie-Regiment 90
  - 295th Oak Leaves on 7 September 1943 as General der Infanterie and commander of LV. Armeekorps

Military offices
Preceded by Generalleutnant Hans Zorn	Commander of 20. Infanterie-Division; 12 January 1942 – 30 January 1943	Succeeded by Generalmajor Georg Jauer
Preceded by Generalmajor Rudolf Freiherr von Roman	Commander of LV. Armeekorps; 10 March 1943 – 5 October 1943	Succeeded by General der Infanterie Friedrich Herrlein
