= Operation Roland =

German offensive of WWII

- Part of Operation Citadel and the Battle of Prokhorovka
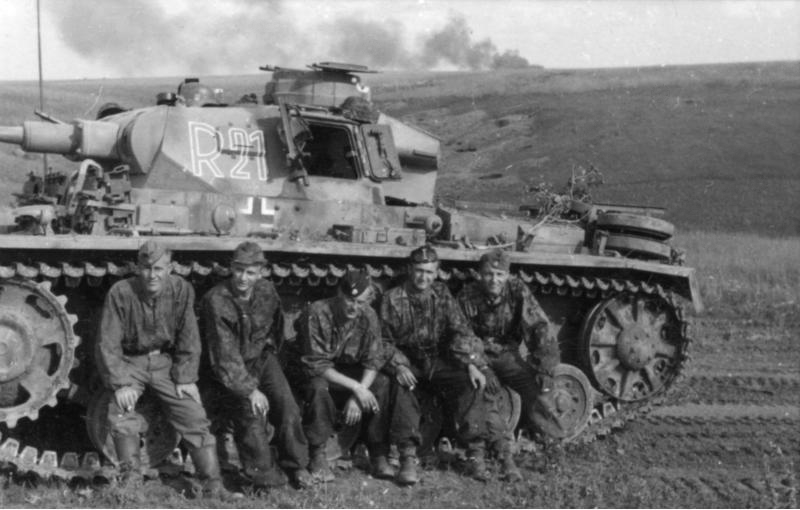
- The crew of a Panzer III from the 2nd SS Panzergrenadier Division Das Reich rest after a rainstorm had poured over the battlefield during Operation Citadel.
- Operational scope: Local offensive
- Planned by: Army Group South of the German Wehrmacht
- Objective: To eliminate Soviet salient between two German panzer corps and destroy the soviet mobile reserves south of Prokhorovka
- Date: Began July 14, 1943
- Executed by: II SS Panzer Corps; III Panzer Corps
- Outcome: Successful elimination of the salient; Unsuccessful encirclement of Soviet units

Operation Roland was a local German offensive inside the Soviet Union during the Second World War on the Eastern Front. It was conducted as a local operation within the overarching German summer offensive, Operation Citadel, on the southern side of the Kursk salient. The German forces of the III Panzer Corps and the 2nd SS Panzer Division ''Das Reich'' of the II SS Panzer Corps attempted to envelop and destroy Soviet forces of the Voronezh Front. This operation was necessitated by the failure of the German II SS Panzer Corps to break through Soviet forces during the Battle of Prokhorovka on 12 July. Therefore, German commanders decided to first link up the III Panzer Corps, which had been lagging behind due to heavy Soviet resistance, with the II SS Panzer Corps, in order to consolidate the German positions into a continuous frontline without inward bulges and enable the two panzer corps to overrun Soviet forces defending Prokhorovka together. The linking up of the two German pincers was planned to effectuate the envelopment of the Soviet 69th Army and other supporting units.

The operation commenced on the morning of 14 July, and by the end of 15 July the two German pincers had linked up, but they failed to trap the majority of the Soviet forces, which by then had already fought their way out of the trap.

== Prelude ==
On the morning of 5 July 1943, the Wehrmacht launched its offensive, Operation Citadel, against the Soviet forces defending the Kursk salient. They made slow but steady progress through the Soviet defensive lines. After a week of fighting, the Soviets launched a major counterattack, which resulted in one of the largest clashes of armoured forces, the Battle of Prokhorovka. The attacking Soviet forces were decimated in the battle, but they succeeded in preventing the Wehrmacht from capturing Prokhorovka and breaking through the third defensive belt – the last heavily fortified one.

On 13 July Hitler summoned Field Marshal Erich von Manstein to his headquarters, the Wolfsschanze in East Prussia. The Allied invasion of Sicily on the night of 9–10 July, combined with the Soviet counteroffensive of Operation Kutuzov against the flank and rear of General Walter Model's 9th Army on the northern side of the Kursk salient on 12 July, and the attacks by strong Soviet forces at Prokhorovka the same day had caused Hitler to stop the offensive and begin redeploying forces to the Mediterranean theatre. He ordered his generals to terminate Operation Citadel.

Manstein was greatly disappointed. He argued that his forces were now on the verge of achieving a major breakthrough in the southern side of the salient. As he saw it, with his III Panzer Corps about to link up with the II SS Panzer Corps at Prokhorovka, and with the XXIV Panzer Corps available as his operational reserve, they would be halting the offensive just at the moment when victory was in hand. With an eye toward the west, Hitler was unwilling to continue the offensive. Manstein persisted, proposing that his forces should at least destroy the Soviet reserves in the southern Kursk salient before Citadel was finally terminated, so that the Soviet fighting capacity in the sector would be depleted for the rest of the summer. Hitler agreed to continue offensive operations in the southern salient until Manstein's goal was achieved.

After the meeting with Hitler on 13 July, Manstein hastily put together the plans for Operation Roland, realizing that he only had a few days to conduct the operation before he lost the II SS Panzer Corps due to redeployment. The plan called for Das Reich to attack east and south and link up with III Panzer Corps, which would attack to the northwest. Totenkopf and Leibstandarte were to anchor the western and northern flanks of Das Reich, respectively. Once the link was achieved and the Soviet forces encircled, Prokhorovka would then be attacked shortly thereafter by the combined forces of the II SS Panzer Corps and III Panzer Corps. The goal of the operation was to destroy the Soviet armoured reserves massed in the southern sector of the Kursk salient, and thereby check Soviet offensive capacity for the rest of the summer.

== Operation ==
The orders for Operation Roland were issued in the closing hours of 13 July 1943. However, after Hitler's meeting with Manstein, Hitler countermanded the XXIV Panzer Corps' deployment to the Kursk salient, sending them on 14 July to support the 1st Panzer Army to the south. The assault began at 04:00 on 14 July.

Following a brief artillery barrage, the 4th SS-Panzergrenadier Regiment Der Führer of Das Reich struck out for the high ground south-west of Pravorot, evicting the remnants of the 2nd Guards Tank Corps from the village of Belenikhino following violent house-to-house and hand-to-hand fighting. Das Reich's 2nd SS-Panzer Regiment fought off a series of counterattacks and forced the Red Army units to withdraw eastward to a new line. Zhukov ordered the 10th Guards Mechanized Brigade of the 5th Guards Mechanized Corps to reinforce the line. The 7th Panzer Division of the III Panzer Corps made contact with Das Reich, but Trufanov, commanding the Soviet forces in the gap, was aware of the threat and conducted a fighting withdrawal. The link-up failed to trap the Soviet forces, though they abandoned a substantial number of their anti-tank guns. Operation Roland failed to produce a decisive result for the German side, and Totenkopf began withdrawing from its positions north of the Psel, following orders issued late on 15 July, as the II SS-Panzer Corps assumed a defensive stance along its entire front.

On 17 July, the Soviet Southwestern and Southern Fronts launched a major offensive across the Mius and Donets Rivers against the southern wing of Army Group South, pressing upon the 6th Army and 1st Panzer Army. In the early afternoon of 17 July, Operation Roland was terminated with an order for the II SS Panzer Corps to begin withdrawing from the Prokhorovka sector back to Belgorod. The 4th Panzer Army and Army Detachment Kempf anticipated the order and began executing it as early as the evening of 16 July. Leibstandarte's tanks were distributed between Das Reich and Totenkopf, and the division was hastily redeployed to Italy, while Das Reich and Totenkopf were dispatched south to meet the new Soviet offensives.

== Aftermath ==
The failure of Operation Roland, combined with the immediate prior strategic failures at Kursk and Prokhorovka, effectively sealed the fate of the Wehrmacht on the Eastern Front. From then on, the Germans would always be fighting defensively, and would never mount such large-scale offensives again for the rest of the war.
