= Dietrich von Saucken =

German general (1892–1980)

- Born: 16 May 1892; Fischhausen, East Prussia, German Empire
- Died: 27 September 1980 (aged 88); Pullach, Bavaria, West Germany
- Burial place: Munich
- Military career
- Allegiance: Kingdom of Prussia; German Empire; Weimar Republic; Nazi Germany
- Branch: Prussian Army; Imperial German Army; Reichsheer; German Army
- Service years: 1910–1945
- Rank: General der Panzertruppe
- Unit: 1st Division
- Commands: 4th Panzer Division; XXXIX Panzer Corps; Panzerkorps Großdeutschland; 2nd Army; Army East Prussia
- Conflicts: See battles World War I Finnish Civil War World War II: Invasion of Poland; Battle of France; Balkan Campaign; Eastern Front; Operation Barbarossa; Battle for Moscow; Battle of Kursk; Operation Bagration; Baltic Offensive; Operation Doppelkopf; Lublin–Brest Offensive; East Pomeranian Offensive; Evacuation of East Prussia
- Awards: Knight's Cross of the Iron Cross with Oak Leaves, Swords and Diamonds

Friedrich Wilhelm Eduard Kasimir Dietrich von (Note: In German personal names, von is a preposition which approximately means 'of' or 'from' and usually denotes some sort of nobility. While von (always lower case) is part of the family name or territorial designation, not a first or middle name, if the noble is referred to by their last name, use Schiller, Clausewitz or Goethe, not von Schiller, etc.) Saucken (16 May 1892 – 27 September 1980) was a German general during World War II who commanded the 2nd Army and the Army East Prussia. Turning down an offer to escape by air, he was taken prisoner by the Red Army in May 1945. Saucken was the last officer to be awarded the Knight's Cross of the Iron Cross with Oak Leaves, Swords and Diamonds of Nazi Germany.

== Early life and career ==
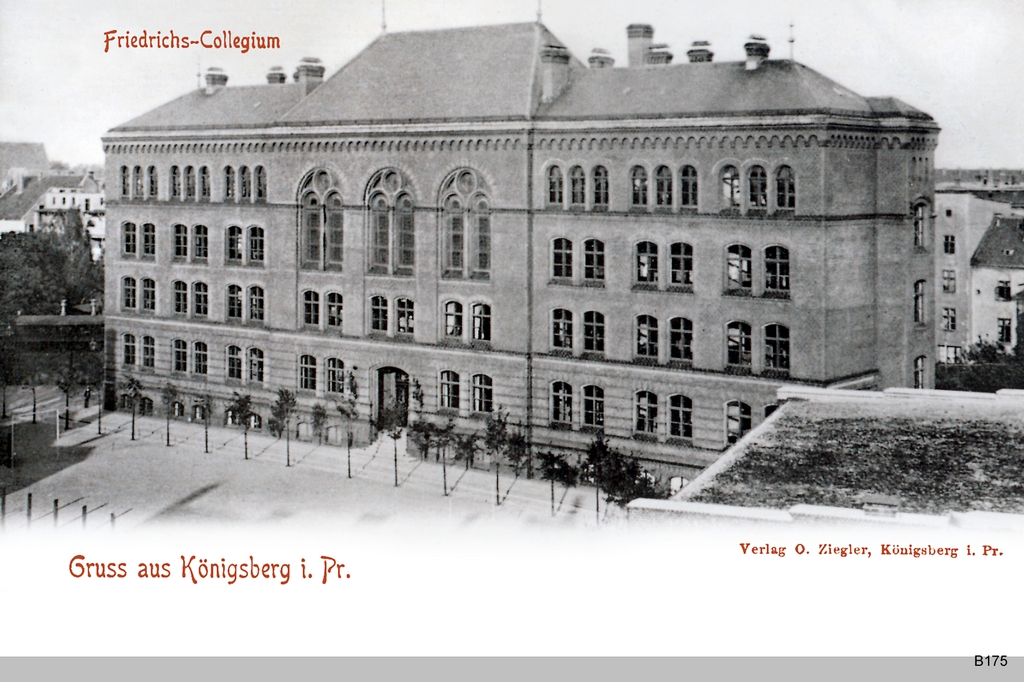
Collegium Fridericianum

Saucken was born on 16 May 1892 in Fischhausen, East Prussia. He was the son of Landrat (the chief administrative officer of a Landkreis) Wilhelm Eduard Hans George Erich von Saucken. As a child, Saucken attended the Collegium Fridericianum, a prestigious gymnasium in Königsberg, present-day Kaliningrad, where he graduated with his Abitur (university-preparatory high school diploma) in 1910. As a student, Saucken showed aptitude as an artist, a talent supported by his mother and the director of the Fridericianum, Georg Ellendt. He often visited Nidden, present-day Nida, Lithuania, where his ambitions to become an artist were influenced by the Künstlerkolonie Nidden, an expressionist artists' colony.

Following graduation, Saucken joined the Prussian Army on 1 October 1910 as a Fahnenjunker (Cadet) in Grenadier-Regiment König Friedrich Wilhelm I. (2. Ostpreußisches) Nr. 3 (2nd East Prussian Grenadier Regiment King Frederick William I Nr. 3), one of the oldest Prussian regiments, subordinated to the 1. Division (1st Division) and based in Königsberg. There, he was promoted to Leutnant (second lieutenant) on 19 June 1912.

== World War I and interwar period ==
With the outbreak of World War I, the division was deployed on the Eastern Front. With the division, Saucken fought in the battles of Stallupönen, Gumbinnen, and Tannenberg and earned the Iron Cross 2nd Class in October 1914.

Saucken then fought in the Battle of Verdun and in the battles of the Carpathian Mountains in September 1917, and received the Iron Cross 1st Class in May 1916. For combat in the German spring offensive and Hundred Days Offensive on the Western Front, he received the Prussian Knight's Cross of the Royal House Order of Hohenzollern with Swords and the Austrian Military Merit Cross. In 1918, he also served with the Baltic Sea Division under the command of General Rüdiger von der Goltz, which fought in the Finnish Civil War (27 January – 15 May 1918).

After the First World War, he joined the paramilitary Freikorps. In 1921, he joined the Reichswehr. From 1927 on, he was on special assignment in the Soviet Union, where he learned to speak Russian. In 1934, he was promoted to Major and posted as an instructor to the War School Hannover. He was promoted to Oberst (colonel) on 1 June 1939.

== World War II ==
Saucken took part in the Battle of France, Balkan Campaign, and Operation Barbarossa as commander of a motorised brigade of the 4th Panzer Division. He was promoted to Generalmajor on 1 January 1942 and appointed divisional commander during the Battle of Moscow. He was wounded and thereafter spent several months in the hospital. He was awarded the Knight's Cross of the Iron Cross on 6 January and was appointed commandant of the School for Mobile Troops (Schule für Schnelle Truppen). On 1 April 1943, he was promoted to Generalleutnant; in June, he returned to the 4th Panzer Division, which he commanded during the Battle of Kursk.

Saucken became acting commander of the III Panzer Corps in late June 1944. He received both the Knight's Cross of the Iron Cross with Oak Leaves and the Knight's Cross of the Iron Cross with Oak Leaves and Swords in 1944.

In June and July, Saucken formed Kampfgruppe von Saucken (Battlegroup von Saucken), an ad hoc unit composed of the remnants of several units destroyed during the Soviet Operation Bagration against the Army Group Centre. Composed mainly of elements of the 5th Panzer Division, 170th Infantry Division, and the 505th Heavy Panzer Battalion, the battlegroup was later designated the XXXIX Panzer Corps. During the Soviet Minsk Offensive, it temporarily maintained an escape route across the Berezina River for retreating German soldiers.

Saucken left the XXXIX Panzer Corps in late September 1944, when he took command of the forming Panzerkorps Großdeutschland. The still incomplete corps was divided when half of it, including Saucken, was ordered eastward to stop the Vistula–Oder Offensive. He led the corps until February 1945, when he was removed from his position and placed in the Führerreserve by Heinz Guderian, the Chief of Staff of the Army at the OKH.

A month later, Saucken commanded the 2nd Army in Prussia and provided logistical support to the Evacuation of East Prussia. In April, his army was renamed to Army East Prussia. On 8 May, the VE day, Saucken received notice that he had been awarded the Knight's Cross with Oak leaves, Swords, and Diamonds, making him the last of 27 officers to receive this award. Though an airplane stood by to evacuate him, he refused to leave his troops when they surrendered to the Red Army on 9 May 1945.

== Later life ==
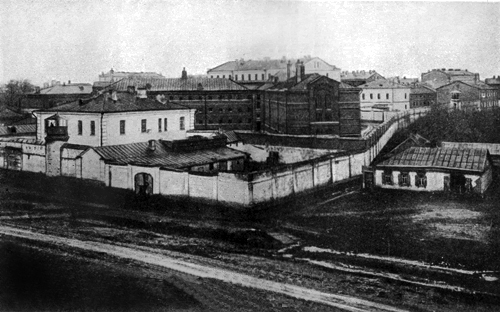
Oryol Prison

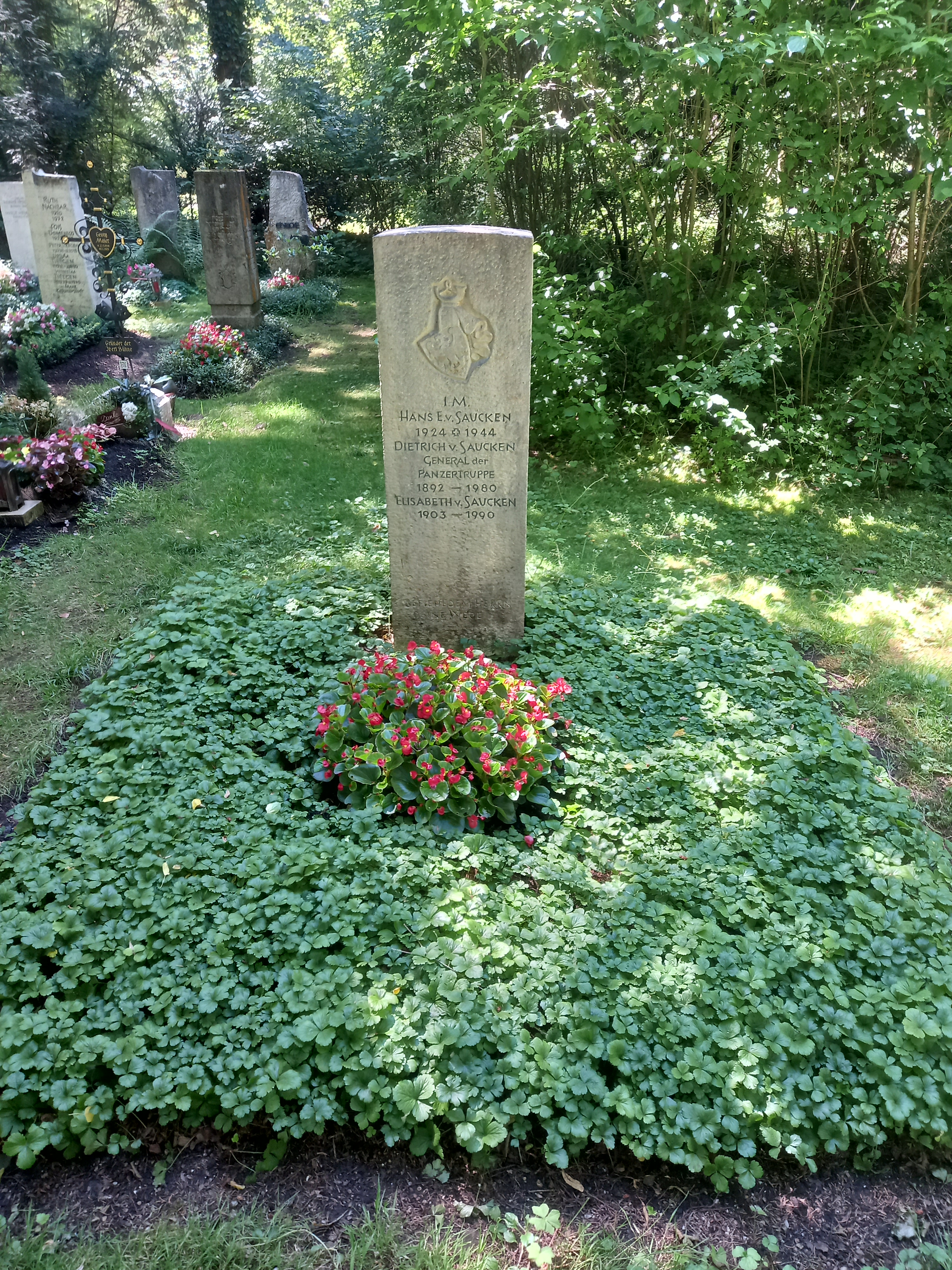
Grave of von Saucken in Solln, Munich, buried with his son (killed in action in Romania during the 1944 First Jassy–Kishinev offensive) and wife Elisabeth.

After surrendering on the Hel Peninsula, Saucken went into Soviet captivity. Initially, he was imprisoned in the Lubyanka Building and the Oryol Prison before being transferred to the Siberian Tayshet camp in 1949. Released from Soviet captivity in 1955, he settled in Pullach near Munich. He died there in 1980.

== Character traits ==
A cavalry officer who regularly wore both a sword and a monocle, Saucken personified the archetypal aristocratic Prussian conservative who despised the braune Bande ("brown mob") of Nazis. When he was ordered to take command of the Second Army on 12 March 1945, he came to Hitler's headquarters with his left hand resting casually on his cavalry sabre, his monocle in his eye, . . . [and then] gave a military salute and gave a slight bow. These were three 'outrages' at once. He had not given the Nazi salute with raised arm and the words 'Heil Hitler', as had been regulation since 20 July 1944, he had not surrendered his weapon on entering....and had kept his monocle in his eye when saluting Hitler.

When Hitler told him that he must take his orders from Albert Forster, the Gauleiter (Nazi governor, or "District Leader") of Danzig, Saucken returned Hitler's gaze....and striking the marble slab of the map table with the flat of his hand, he said, 'I have no intention, Herr Hitler, of placing myself under the orders of a Gauleiter'. In doing this, he had bluntly contradicted Hitler and not addressed him as Mein Führer.

To the surprise of everyone present, Hitler capitulated and replied, "All right, Saucken, keep the command yourself." Hitler dismissed the General without shaking his hand, and Saucken left the room with only the merest hint of a bow.

However, this alleged incident is disputed by Heinz Linge in his book 'In the footsteps of the Führer'. General von Saucken was considered a loyal commander to whom this behavior certainly did not fit (he received the Knight's Cross with Oak Leaves, Swords, and Diamonds on 8 May). In addition, Linge describes the fact that he would not have addressed Hitler with 'Mein Führer' and with the flat hand on the chart table as completely unbelievable.

== Promotions ==
- 1.10.1910 Fahnenjunker (Officer Candidate)
- 19.7.1911 (Fahnenjunker-)Unteroffizier (Officer Candidate with Corporal/NCO/Junior Sergeant rank)
- 18.8.1911 Fähnrich (Officer Cadet)
  - 17.5.1912 Certificate of maturity as a future officer
- 19.6.1912 Leutnant (2nd Lieutenant)
- 18.8.1917 Oberleutnant (1st Lieutenant)
- 1.4.1925 Rittmeister
- 1.5.1934 Major
- 2.10.1936 Oberstleutnant (Lieutenant Colonel) with effect and Rank Seniority (RDA) from 1.10.1936
- 1.6.1939 Oberst (Colonel)
  - 14 August 1940 received new RDA from 1 January 1938
- 13.12.1941 Generalmajor (Major General) with effect and RDA from 1.1.1942
- 20.4.1943 Generalleutnant (Lieutenant General) with effect and RDA from 1.4.1943
- 1.8.1944 General der Panzertruppe

== Awards and decorations ==
- Iron Cross (1914)
  - 2nd Class on 19 October 1914
  - 1st Class on 23 May 1916
- Military Merit Cross (Austria-Hungary), 3rd Class with the War Decoration (ÖM3K)
- Royal House Order of Hohenzollern, Knight's Cross with Swords (HOH3X)
- Wound Badge (1918) in Mattgelb (Gold)
- Honour Cross of the World War 1914/1918 with Swords
- Wehrmacht Long Service Award, 4th to 1st Class
- Repetition Clasp 1939 to the Iron Cross 1914, 2nd and 1st Class
  - 2nd Class on 13 September 1939
  - 1st Class on 3 October 1939
- Panzer Badge in Bronze on 23 July 1941
- Wound Badge (1939) in Gold on 6 January 1942
- Eastern Front Medal on 9 September 1942
- Three references in the Wehrmachtbericht on 3.12.1943, 5.7.1944 and 9.5.1945
- Knight's Cross of the Iron Cross with Oak Leaves, Swords and Diamonds
  - Knight's Cross on 6 January 1942 as Generalmajor and Leader of the 4. Panzer-Division/LIII. Armee-Korps/2. Panzer-Armee/Heeresgruppe Mitte
  - 281st Oak Leaves on 22 August 1943 as Generalleutnant and Commander of the 4. Panzer-Division/XXXXVI. Panzer-Korps/9. Armee/Heeresgruppe Mitte
  - 46th Swords on 31 January 1944 as Generalleutnant and Commander of the 4. Panzer-Division/XXXXVI. Panzer-Korps/9. Armee/Heeresgruppe Mitte
  - 27th Diamonds on 8 May 1945 as General der Panzertruppe and Oberbefehlshaber Armeeoberkommando Ostpreußen (Dönitz-Erlaß)

== Notes ==
Military offices
Preceded by General der Panzertruppe Willibald Freiherr von Langermann und Erlencamp	Commander of 4. Panzer-Division; 27 December 1941 – 2 January 1942	Succeeded by General der Panzertruppe Willibald Freiherr von Langermann und Erlencamp
Preceded by Generalleutnant Erich Schneider	Commander of 4. Panzer-Division; 31 May 1943 – January 1944	Succeeded by Generalleutnant Hans Junck
Preceded by Generalleutnant Hans Junck	Commander of 4. Panzer-Division; February 1944 – 1 May 1944	Succeeded by Generalleutnant Clemens Betzel
Preceded by General der Panzertruppe Hermann Breith	Commander of III. Armeekorps; 31 May 1944 – 29 June 1944	Succeeded by General der Panzertruppe Hermann Breith
Preceded by Generalleutnant Otto Schünemann	Commander of XXXIX.Panzerkorps; 29 June 1944 – 15 October 1944	Succeeded by General der Panzertruppe Karl Decker
Preceded by None	Commander of Panzerkorps Großdeutschland; 28 September 1944 – 11 February 1945	Succeeded by Generalleutnant Georg Jauer
Preceded by General Walter Weiß	Commander of 2. Armee; 10 March 1945 – 7 April 1945	Succeeded by AOK Ostpreußen
Preceded by: 2. Armee	Commander of AOK Ostpreußen; 7 April 1945 – 9 May 1945	Succeeded by German surrender
