= Operation Citadel =

German operation to capture Kursk from the USSR during WWII

- Part of the Battle of Kursk on the Eastern Front of World War II
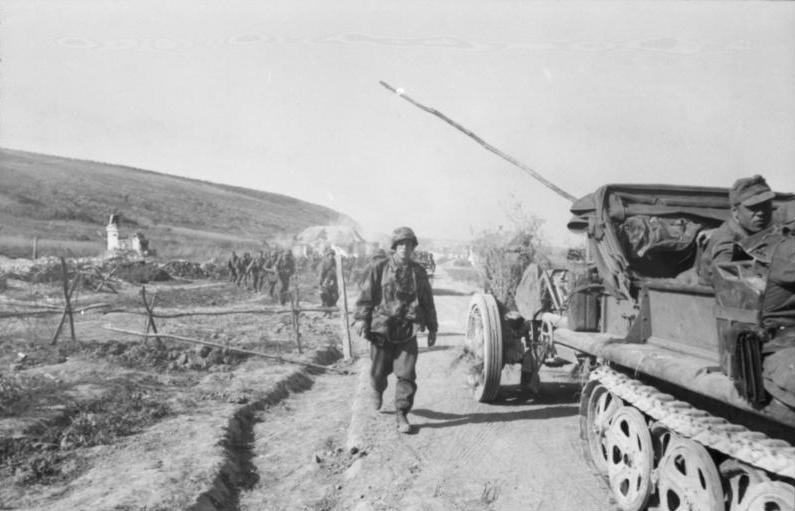
- German Sd.Kfz. 10 half-track towing a gun during the operation
| Date | 5–12 July 1943 (Northern side: 1 week); 5–17 July 1943 (Southern side: 1 week and 5 days) |
| Location | Kursk, Russian SFSR, Soviet Union |
| Result | Soviet victory (Note: Describing the Soviet victory, historian Antony Beevor wrote that, "The German army had received a severe battering ... the Germans had no choice but to withdraw to the line of the River Dnepr, and start to pull their remaining forces out from the bridgehead left on the Taman peninsula".) |
| Territorial changes | Soviets prevent a German breakthrough and inflict high attrition on German forces |

Belligerents
| (Nazi Germany) Germany | Soviet Union |

Commanders and leaders
| (Nazi Germany) Erich von Manstein; (Nazi Germany) Günther von Kluge; (Nazi Germany) Hermann Hoth; (Nazi Germany) Werner Kempf; (Nazi Germany) Walter Model | (Soviet Union) Georgy Zhukov; (Soviet Union) K.K. Rokossovsky; (Soviet Union) Nikolai Vatutin; (Soviet Union) Ivan Konev; (Soviet Union) Pavel Rotmistrov |

Strength
| Operation Citadel: 780,900 men; 2,928 tanks; 9,966 guns and mortars | Operation Citadel: 1,910,361 men; 5,128 tanks; 25,013 guns and mortars |

Casualties and losses
| Operation Citadel: (Note: Operation Citadel refers to the German offensive from 4 to 16 July, but Soviet losses are for the period of 5–23 July.); 54,182 men (Note: The breakdown as shown in Frieser (2007, p. 154) is as follows: 9,063 KIA, 43,159 WIA and 1,960 MIA.); 323 tanks and assault guns destroyed, Between 600–1,612 tanks and assault guns damaged; 159 aircraft; c. 500 guns; Battle of Kursk: (Note: The whole Battle of Kursk refers to the period of the German offensive (Operation Citadel) and the subsequent Soviet counteroffensives, from 4 July to 23 August.); 45,444 killed or missing and 119,843 wounded (per German military medical data); Total 165,287 men; Estimate 760 tanks and assault guns destroyed (Note: Exact numbers are unknown; the entire German eastern front lost 1,331 tanks and assault guns for July and August, so the number of 760 is an estimate.Frieser 2007, p. 201); 681 aircraft (for 5–31 July) (Note: Figures for 5–31 July, as given by the Luftwaffe logistics staff (Generalquartiermeister der Luftwaffe).) | Operation Citadel: 177,847 men; 1,614–1,956 tanks and assault guns destroyed; 459 aircraft; ~1,000 aircraft; Battle of Kursk: 254,470 killed, missing or captured 608,833 wounded or sick (Note: The breakdown as shown in Krivosheev (1997, pp. 132–134) is as follows: Kursk-defence: 177,847; Orel-counter: 429,890; Belgorod-counter: 255,566.); Total 863,000 men; 6,064 tanks and assault guns destroyed or damaged (Note: The breakdown as shown in Krivosheev (1997, p. 262) is as follows: Kursk-defence; 1,614. Orel-counter; 2,586. Belgorod-counter; 1,864.); 1,626–1,961 aircraft; 5,244 guns |

Operation Citadel (German: Unternehmen Zitadelle) was the German offensive operation in July 1943 against Soviet forces in the Kursk salient, proposed by Generalfeldmarschall Erich von Manstein during the Second World War on the Eastern Front that initiated the Battle of Kursk. The deliberate defensive operation that the Soviets implemented to repel the German offensive is referred to as the Kursk Strategic Defensive Operation. The German offensive was countered by two Soviet counter-offensives, Operation Polkovodets Rumyantsev (Russian: Полководец Румянцев) and Operation Kutuzov (Russian: Кутузов). For the Germans, the battle was the final strategic offensive that they were able to launch on the Eastern Front. As the Allied invasion of Sicily began, Adolf Hitler was forced to divert troops training in France to meet the Allied threats in the Mediterranean, rather than use them as a strategic reserve for the Eastern Front. Germany's extensive losses of men and equipment during the operation, though significantly lower than those suffered by the Soviets, delivered the Red Army the strategic initiative for the remainder of the war.

The Germans hoped to weaken the Soviet offensive potential for the summer of 1943 by cutting off a large number of forces that they anticipated would be in the Kursk salient. The Kursk salient, or bulge, was 250 kilometres (160 mi) long from north to south and 160 kilometres (99 mi) from east to west. The plan envisioned an envelopment by a pair of pincers breaking through the northern and southern flanks of the salient. Hitler believed that a victory here would reassert German strength and improve his prestige with his allies, who were considering withdrawing from the war. It was also hoped that large numbers of Soviet prisoners would be captured to be used as slave labour in the German armaments industry.

The Soviet government had foreknowledge of the German intentions, provided in part by the British intelligence services, and by the intelligence transmitted by the Lucy spy ring. Aware months in advance that the attack would fall on the neck of the Kursk salient, the Soviets built a defence in depth designed to wear down the German armoured spearhead. The Germans meanwhile delayed the offensive while they deployed their forces and waited for new weapons, mainly the new Panther tank but also larger numbers of the Tiger tank. This gave the Red Army time to construct a series of deep defensive belts. The defensive preparations included minefields, fortifications, artillery fire zones and anti-tank strong points, which extended approximately 300 km (190 mi) in depth. Soviet mobile formations were moved out of the salient and a large reserve force was formed for strategic counter-offensives.

== Background ==
After the conclusion of the battle for the Donets, as the spring rasputitsa (mud) season came to an end in 1943, both the German and Soviet commands considered their plans for future operations. The Soviet Premier Joseph Stalin and some senior Soviet officers wanted to seize the initiative first and attack the German forces inside the Soviet Union, but they were convinced by a number of key commanders, including the Deputy Supreme Commander Georgy Zhukov, to assume a defensive posture instead. This would allow the German side to weaken themselves in attacking prepared positions, after which the Soviet forces would be able to respond with a counter-offensive.

Strategic discussions also occurred on the German side, with Erich von Manstein arguing for a mobile defence that would give up terrain and allow the Soviet units to advance, while the German forces would launch a series of sharp counterattacks against their flanks to inflict heavy attrition. But for political reasons, German Chancellor Adolf Hitler insisted that the German forces go on the offensive, choosing the Kursk salient for the attack. On 15 April 1943, the Führer authorized preparations for Unternehmen Zitadelle (Operation Citadel).

Operation Citadel called for a double envelopment, directed at Kursk, to surround the Soviet defenders of five armies and seal off the salient. Army Group Centre would provide General Walter Model's 9th Army to form the northern pincer. It would cut through the northern face of the salient, driving south to the hills east of Kursk, securing the rail line from Soviet attack. Army Group South would commit the 4th Panzer Army, under Hermann Hoth, and Army Detachment Kempf, under Werner Kempf, to pierce the southern face of the salient. This force would drive north to meet the 9th Army east of Kursk. Von Manstein's main attack was to be delivered by Hoth's 4th Panzer Army, spearheaded by the II SS Panzer Corps under Paul Hausser. The XLVIII Panzer Corps, commanded by Otto von Knobelsdorff, would advance on the left while Army Detachment Kempf would advance on the right. The 2nd Army, under the command of Walter Weiss, would contain the western portion of the salient.

=== Obstacles and postponements ===
The German offensive, originally slated to commence in the beginning of May, was postponed several times as the German leadership reconsidered and vacillated over its prospects, as well as to bring forward more units and equipment.

As soon as Operations Order 6 was issued, which dictated that the operation should be ready to start on six days' notice after 28 April, the Ninth Army, which was to command the offensive in the Army Group Center zone, protested that its deployment could not be completed by 3 May. At a 3 May meeting, Hitler conferred with Manstein, Kluge, Zeitzler, Guderian, Speer, Chief of Staff OKL Generaloberst Hans Jeschonnek, and Commanding General, Ninth Army, Generaloberst Walter Model. There followed a discussion on the problems Model expected the Ninth Army to encounter in breaking through a "well-fortified" Soviet front and the inability of the Panzer IV tanks to stand up to the new Soviet antitank weapons. Hitler closed the meeting without giving a decision, but indicated privately to Model that there would be a postponement. Manstein, Kluge, Zeitzler, Jeschonnek objected to the delay; Guderian and Speer objected to Citadel being executed at all because, even if successful, they argued, it would cause heavy tank losses and upset plans for an increase in armor strength for the German forces. Hitler decided to let Citadel wait until June, by which time he expected to have tanks of a newer model (Tiger I) available in quantity. On 6 May, the OKH announced that Citadel was postponed to 12 June.

On 10 May, Guderian was summoned to the Reich Chancellery in Berlin, for a discussion on the production of the Panther tank, and potential delays in its program. After the conference, Guderian asked for an audience with Hitler, in which Keitel, Guderian's Chief of Staff Wolfgang Thomale, and Karl Saur of the Armaments Ministry were also present. There, as Guderian reports in his memoirs, he asked the Führer, "Why do you want to attack in the East at all? How many people do you think even know where Kursk is? It is a matter of profound indifference to the world whether we hold Kursk or not. Why do we want to attack in the East at all this year?" Hitler, according to Guderian, responded:

You're quite right. Whenever I think of this attack my stomach turns over.

Hitler assured Guderian that there was yet no commitment to the operation. However, at a May meeting of high Nazi Party officials, Hitler compared the current situation in the Eastern front to the predicament of the party in 1932, when it seemed to go down in political defeat at the hands of Franz von Papen and Hindenburg. He stated

In 1932, we attained victory only by stubbornness that sometimes looked like madness; so, too, we will achieve it today.

In the first weeks of June, the forces for Citadel were at their peak strength. On 18 June, the OKW Operations Staff submitted a proposal that Citadel be abandoned, and that all troops that could be spared should be deployed into strategic reserves for the defense of Italy and the Balkans, as well as Germany proper. On the same day, Hitler responded that he "fully appreciated" the General Staff's view, but had decided to go ahead; two days later, he set the time for 5 July.

The Soviet leadership, through their intelligence agencies and foreign sources, had been informed about the German intentions, and therefore the multiple delays by the German high command, OKW, allowed them a great deal of time to prepare their defences. Employing defence in depth, they constructed a series of defensive lines to wear down the attacking panzer formations. Three belts made up of extensive minefields, anti-tank ditches and anti-tank gun emplacements were created. Behind those were an additional three belts, which were mostly unoccupied and less fortified. The Voronezh Front, commanded by General Nikolai Vatutin, was tasked with defending the southern face of the salient. The Central Front, commanded by Konstantin Konstantinovich Rokossovsky, defended the northern face. Waiting in reserve was the Steppe Front, commanded by Ivan Konev. In February 1943, the Central Front had been reconstructed from the Don Front, which had been part of the northern pincer of Operation Uranus and had been responsible for the destruction of the 6th Army at Stalingrad.

=== Preliminary actions ===
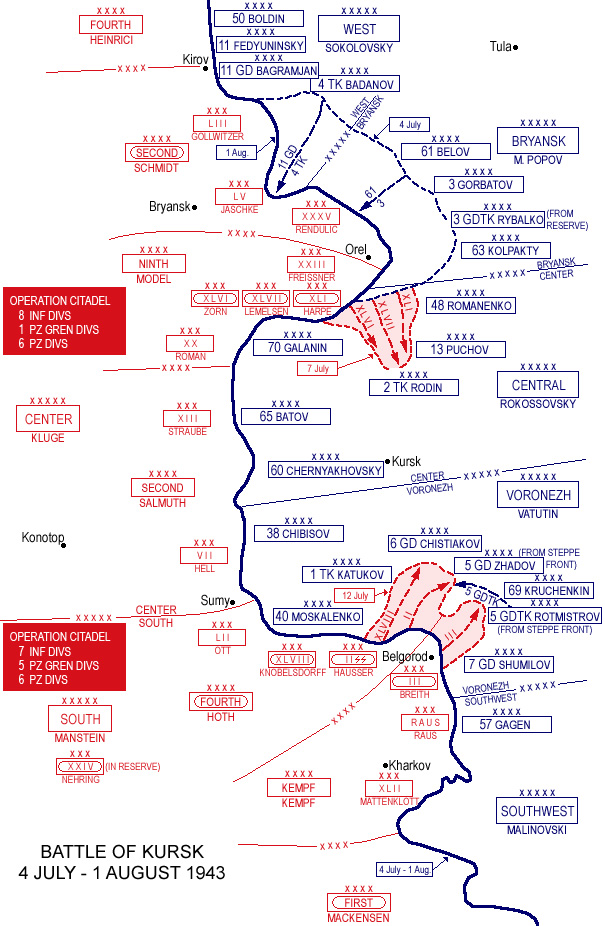
German penetration during the Battle of Kursk

Fighting started on the southern face of the salient on the evening of 4 July 1943, when German infantry launched attacks to seize high ground for artillery observation posts before the main assault. During these attacks a number of Red Army command and observation posts along the first main belt of defence were captured. By 16:00, elements of the Panzergrenadier Division "Großdeutschland", 3rd and 11th Panzer Divisions had seized the village of Butovo and proceeded to capture Gertsovka before midnight. At around 22:30, Vatutin ordered 600 guns, mortars and Katyusha rocket launchers, of the Voronezh Front, to bombard the forward German positions, particularly those of the II SS Panzer Corps.

To the north, at Central Front headquarters, reports of the anticipated German offensive came in. At around 02:00 5 July, Zhukov ordered his preemptive artillery bombardment to begin. The hope was to disrupt German forces concentrating for the attack, but the outcome was less than hoped for. The bombardment delayed the German formations, but failed in the goal of disrupting their schedule or inflicting substantial losses. The Germans began their own artillery bombardment at about 05:00, which lasted 80 minutes in the northern face and 50 minutes in the southern face. After the barrage, the ground forces attacked, aided by close air support provided by the Luftwaffe.

In the early morning of 5 July, the VVS launched a large raid against German airfields, hoping to destroy the Luftwaffe on the ground. This effort failed, and the Red Army air units suffered considerable losses. (Note: The air operation is misunderstood in most accounts. The German Freya radar stations at Belgorod and Kharkov in 1943 had only picked up Soviet air formations approaching Belgorod and were not responsible for the failure of the entire Soviet preemptive air strike on the eve of Operation Citadel. (Bergström 2007, pp. 26–27).) The VVS lost 176 aircraft on 5 July, compared to the 26 aircraft lost by the Luftwaffe. The losses of the VVS 16th Air Army operating in the northern face were lighter than those suffered by the 2nd Air Army. The Luftwaffe was able to gain and maintained air superiority over the southern face until 10–11 July, when the VVS began to obtain ascendency but the control of the skies over the northern face was evenly contested until the VVS began to gain air superiority on 7 July, which it maintained for the rest of the operation.

== Operation along the northern face ==
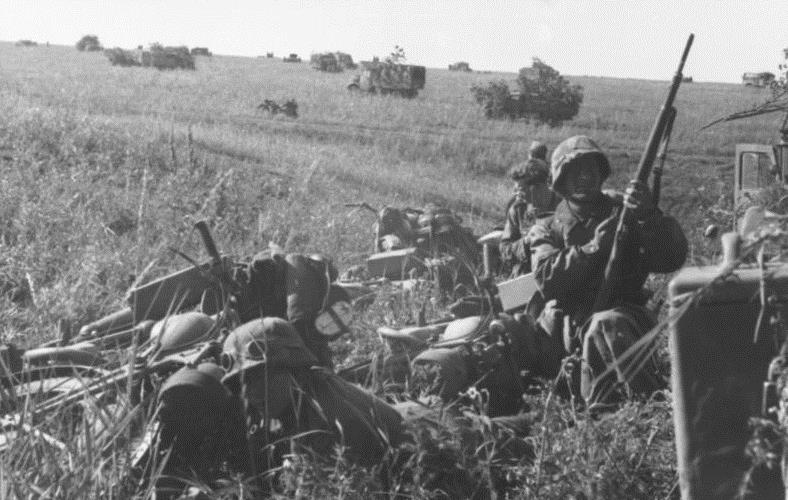
German motorised troops prepare to move out.

Model's main attack was delivered by XLVII Panzer Corps, supported by 45 Tigers of the attached 505th Heavy Tank Battalion. Covering their left flank was XLI Panzer Corps, with an attached regiment of 83 Ferdinand tank destroyers. On the right flank, XLVI Panzer Corps consisted at this time of four infantry divisions with just 9 tanks and 31 assault guns. To the left of XLI Panzer Corps was XXIII Army Corps, which consisted of the reinforced 78th Assault Infantry Division and two regular infantry divisions. While the corps contained no tanks, it did have 62 assault guns. Opposing the 9th Army was the Central Front, deployed in three heavily fortified defensive belts.

=== Initial German advance ===
Model chose to make his initial attacks using infantry divisions reinforced with assault guns and heavy tanks, and supported by artillery and the Luftwaffe. In doing so he sought to maintain the armoured strength of his panzer divisions to be used for exploitation once the Red Army defences were breached. Once a breakthrough had been achieved the panzer forces would move through and advance towards Kursk. Jan Möschen, a major in Model's staff, later commented that Model expected a breakthrough on the second day. If a breakthrough was achieved, the briefest delay in bringing up the panzer divisions would give the Red Army time to react. His corps commanders, however, thought a breakthrough extremely unlikely.

Following a preliminary bombardment and Red Army counter bombardments, the 9th Army opened its attack at 05:30 on 5 July. Nine infantry divisions and one panzer division, with attached assault guns, heavy tanks, and tank destroyers, pushed forward. Two companies of Tiger tanks were attached to the 6th Infantry Division, and were the largest single grouping of Tigers employed that day. Opposing them were the 13th and 70th Armies of the Central Front.

The 20th Panzer and 6th Infantry Divisions of the XLVII Panzer Corps spearheaded the advance of the XLVII Panzer Corps. Behind them the remaining two panzer divisions followed, ready to exploit any breakthrough. The heavily mined terrain and fortified positions of the 15th Rifle Division slowed the advance. By 08:00, safe lanes had been cleared through the minefield. That morning information obtained from prisoner interrogation identified a weakness at the boundary of the 15th and 81st Rifle Divisions caused by the German preliminary bombardment. The Tigers were redeployed and struck towards this area. Red Army formations countered with a force of around 90 T-34s. In the resulting three-hour battle, Red Army armoured units lost 42 tanks while the Germans lost two Tigers and a further five more immobilized with track damage. While the Red Army counterattack was defeated and the first defensive belt breached, the fighting had delayed the Germans long enough for the rest of 29th Rifle Corps of the 13th Army – initially deployed behind the first belt – to move forward and seal the breach. Red Army minefields were covered by artillery fire, making efforts to clear paths through the fields difficult and costly. Goliath and Borgward IV remote-controlled engineer mine-clearing vehicles met with limited success. Of the 653rd Heavy Panzerjäger Battalion's 45 Ferdinands sent into battle, all but 12 of them were immobilized by mine damage before 17:00. Most of these were later repaired and returned to service, but the recovery of these very large vehicles was difficult.

On the first day, the XLVII Panzer Corps penetrated 6 mi (9.7 km) into the Red Army defences before stalling, and the XLI Panzer Corps reached the heavily fortified small town of Ponyri, in the second defensive belt, which controlled the roads and railways leading south to Kursk. In the first day, the Germans penetrated 5 to 6 mi (8.0 to 9.7 km) into the Red Army lines for the loss of 1,287 men killed and missing and a further 5,921 wounded.

=== Red Army counterattack ===
Rokossovsky ordered the 17th Guards and 18th Guards Rifle Corps with the 2nd Tank Army and 19th Tank Corps, backed up by close air support, to counterattack the German 9th Army the following day on 6 July. However, due to poor coordination, only the 16th Tank Corps of the 2nd Tank Army commenced the counterattack on the dawn of 6 July after the preparatory artillery barrage. The 16th Tank Corps, fielding about 200 tanks, attacked the XLVII Panzer Corps and ran into the Tiger tanks of the 505th Heavy Tank Battalion, which knocked out 69 tanks and forced the rest to withdraw to the 17th Guards Rifle Corps of the 13th Army. Later that morning, the XLVII Panzer Corps responded with its own attack against the 17th Guards Rifle Corps entrenched around the village Olkhovatka in the second defensive belt. The attack commenced with an artillery barrage and was spearheaded by the 24 serviceable Tigers of the 505th Heavy Tank Battalion, but it failed to break the Red Army defence at Olkhovatka, and the Germans suffered heavy casualties. Olkhovatka was on a high ground that provided a clear view of much of the frontline. At 18:30, the 19th Tank Corps joined the 17th Guards Rifle Corps further bolstering resistance. Rokossovsky also decided to dig in most of his remaining tanks to minimize their exposure. Ponyri, defended by the 307th Rifle Division of the 29th Rifle Corps, was also concertedly attacked on 6 July by the German 292nd and 86th Infantry, 78th Assault Infantry and 9th Panzer Divisions, but the Germans were unable to dislodge the defenders from the heavily fortified village.

=== Ponyri and Olkhovatka ===
Over the next three days from 7 to 10 July, Model concentrated the effort of the 9th Army at Ponyri and Olkhovatka, which both sides considered as vital positions. In response, Rokossovsky pulled forces from other parts of the front to these sectors. The Germans attacked Ponyri on 7 July, and captured half of the town after intense house-to-house fighting. A Soviet counterattack the following morning forced the Germans to withdraw, and a series of counterattacks ensued by both sides with control of the town being exchanged several times over the next few days. By 10 July, the Germans had secured most of the town, but Soviet counterattacks continued. The back and forth battles for Ponyri and the nearby Hill 253.5 were battles of attrition, with heavy casualties on both sides. It became referred to by the troops as "mini-Stalingrad". The war diary of the 9th Army described the heavy fighting as a "new type of mobile attrition battle". German attacks on Olkhovatka and the nearby village of Teploe failed to penetrate the Soviet defences; including a powerful concerted attack on 10 July by about 300 German tanks and assault guns from the 2nd, 4th, and 20th Panzer Divisions, supported by all available Luftwaffe air power in the northern face.

On 9 July a meeting between Kluge, Model, Joachim Lemelsen and Josef Harpe was held at the headquarters of the XLVII Panzer Corps. It had become clear to the German commanders that the 9th Army lacked the strength to obtain a breakthrough, and their Soviet counterparts had also realized this, but Kluge wished to maintain the pressure on the Soviets in order to aid the southern offensive.

While the operation on the northern side of the salient began with a 45-kilometre-wide (28 mi) attack front, by 6 July it had been reduced to 40-kilometre-wide (25 mi) front. The following day the attack frontage dropped to 15-kilometre-wide (9.3 mi), and on both the 8 and 9 July penetrations of only 2-kilometre-wide (1.2 mi) front occurred. By 10 July, the Soviets had completely halted the German advance.

On 12 July the Soviets launched Operation Kutuzov, their counter-offensive upon the Orel salient, which threatened the flank and rear of Model's 9th Army. The 12th Panzer Division, thus far held in reserve and slated to be committed to the northern side of the Kursk salient, along with the 36th Motorized Divisions, 18th Panzer and 20th Panzer Divisions were redeployed to face the Soviet spearheads.

== Operation along the southern face ==
At around 04:00 on 5 July, the German attack commenced with a preliminary bombardment. Manstein's main attack was delivered by Hoth's 4th Panzer Army, which was organized into densely concentrated spearheads. Opposing the 4th Panzer Army was the Soviet 6th Guards Army, which was composed of the 22nd Guards Rifle Corps and 23rd Guards Rifle Corps. The Soviets had constructed three heavily fortified defensive belts to slow and weaken the attacking armoured forces. Though they had been provided superb intelligence, the Voronezh Front headquarters had still not been able to pinpoint the exact location where the Germans would place their offensive weight.

=== Initial German advance ===
==== XLVIII Panzer Corps ====
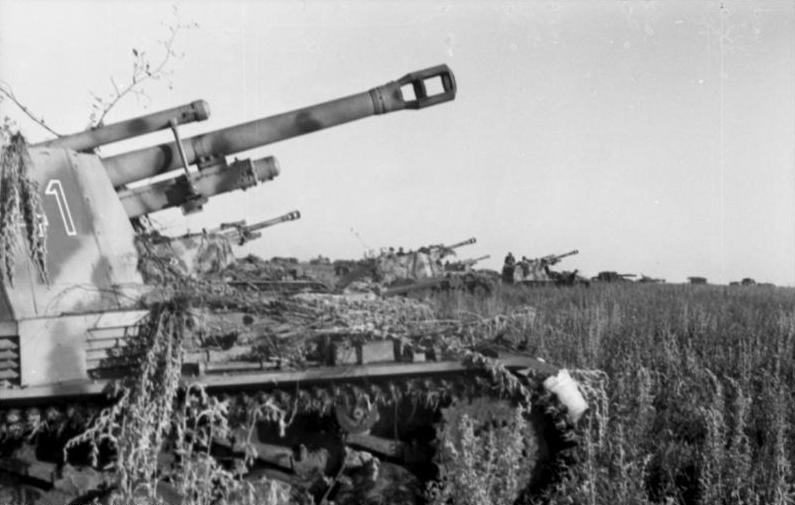
Wespe self-propelled artillery battery in position to provide fire support

The panzergrenadier division Großdeutschland, commanded by Walter Hörnlein, was the strongest single division in the 4th Panzer Army. It was supported on its flanks by the 3rd and 11th Panzer Divisions. Großdeutschland's Panzer IIIs and IVs had been supplemented by a company of 15 Tigers, which were used to spearhead the attack. At dawn on 5 July, Großdeutschland, backed by heavy artillery support, advanced on a three-kilometre front upon the 67th Guards Rifle Division of the 22nd Guards Rifle Corps. The Panzerfüsilier Regiment, advancing on the left wing, stalled in a minefield and subsequently 36 Panthers were immobilized. The stranded regiment was subjected to a barrage of Soviet anti-tank and artillery fire, which inflicted numerous casualties. Engineers were moved up and cleared paths through the minefield, but suffered casualties in the process. The combination of fierce resistance, minefields, thick mud and mechanical breakdowns took its toll. With paths cleared, the regiment resumed its advance towards Gertsovka. In the ensuing battle, heavy casualties were sustained including the regimental commander Colonel Kassnitz. Due to the fighting, and the marshy terrain south of the village, surrounding the Berezovyy stream, the regiment once more became bogged down.

The panzergrenadier regiment of Großdeutschland, advancing on the right wing, pushed through to the village of Butovo. The tanks were deployed in an arrow formation to minimise the effects of the Soviet Pakfront defence, with the Tigers leading and the Panzer IIIs, IVs and assault guns fanning out to the flanks and rear. They were followed by infantry and combat engineers. Attempts by the VVS to impede the advance were repulsed by the Luftwaffe.

The 3rd Panzer Division, advancing on the left flank of Großdeutschland, made good progress and by the end of the day had captured Gertsovka and reached Mikhailovka. The 167th Infantry Division, on the right flank of the 11th Panzer Division, also made sufficient progress, reaching Tirechnoe by the end of the day. By the end of 5 July, a wedge had been created in the first belt of the Soviet defences.

==== II SS Panzer Corps ====
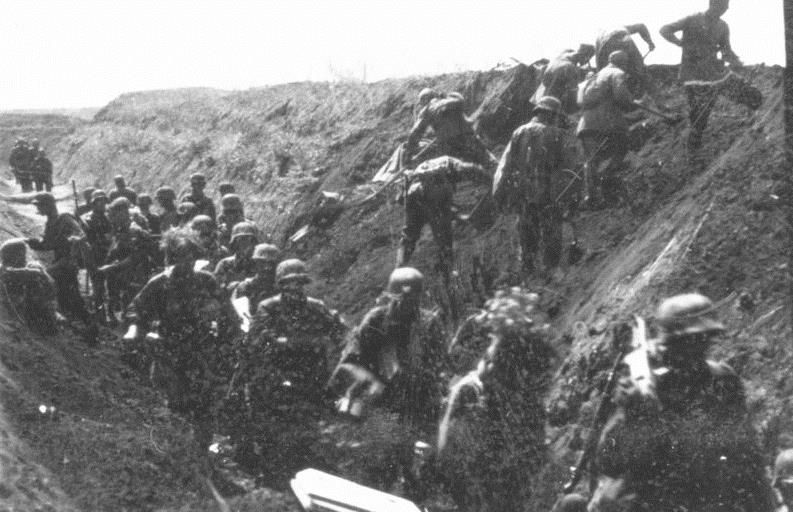
German soldiers move along an anti-tank ditch, while combat engineers prepare charges to breach it.

To the east, during the night of 4–5 July, SS combat engineers had infiltrated no-man's land and cleared lanes through the Soviet minefields. At dawn, 5 July, the three divisions of II SS Panzer Corps – SS Panzergrenadier Division Leibstandarte Adolf Hitler, 2nd SS Panzergrenadier Division Das Reich and the 3rd SS Panzergrenadier Division Totenkopf – attacked the 6th Guards Army's 52nd Guards Rifle Division. The main assault was led by a spearhead of 42 Tigers, but in total 494 tanks and assault guns attacked across a twelve-kilometre front. Totenkopf, the strongest of the three divisions, advanced towards Gremuchhi and screened the right flank. The 1st SS Panzergrenadier Division advanced on the left flank towards Bykovka. The 2nd SS Panzer Division advanced between the two formations in the center. Following closely behind the tanks were the infantry and combat engineers, coming forward to demolish obstacles and clear trenches. In addition, the advance was well supported by the Luftwaffe, which greatly aided in breaking Soviet strong points and artillery positions.

By 09:00 hours, the II SS Panzer Corps had broken through the Soviet first belt of defence along its entire front. While probing positions between the first and second Soviet defensive belts, at 13:00, the 2nd SS Panzer Division's vanguard came under fire from two T-34 tanks, which were destroyed. Forty more Soviet tanks soon engaged the division. The 1st Guards Tank Army clashed with the 2nd SS Panzer Division in a four-hour battle, resulting in the Soviet tanks withdrawing. However, the battle had bought enough time for units of the 23rd Soviet Guards Rifle Corps, lodged in the Soviet second belt, to prepare itself and be reinforced with additional anti-tank guns. By the early evening, 2nd SS Panzer Division had reached the minefields that marked the outer perimeter of the Soviet second belt of defence. The 1st SS Division had secured Bykovka by 16:10. It then pushed forward towards the second belt of defence at Yakovlevo, but its attempts to break through were rebuffed. By the end of the day, the 1st SS Division had sustained 97 dead, 522 wounded, and 17 missing and lost about 30 tanks. Together with the 2nd SS Panzer Division, it had forced a wedge far into the defences of the 6th Guards Army.

The 3rd SS Panzer Division was making slow progress. They had managed to isolate the 155th Guards Regiment, of the 52nd Guards Rifle Division (of the 23rd Guards Rifle Corps), from the rest of its parent division, but its attempts to sweep the regiment eastward into the flank of the neighbouring 375th Rifle Division (of the 23rd Guards Rifle Corps) had failed when the regiment was reinforced by the 96th Tank Brigade. Hausser, the commander of II SS Panzer Corps, requested aid from the III Panzer Corps to his right, but the panzer corps had no units to spare. By the end of the day, the 3rd SS Division had made very limited progress due in part to a tributary of the Donets River. The lack of progress undermined the advance made by its sister divisions and exposed the right flank of the corps to Soviet forces. The temperatures reaching over 30 degrees Celsius, and frequent thunderstorms made fighting conditions difficult.

The 6th Guards Army, which confronted the attack by the XLVIII Panzer Korps and II SS Panzer Korps, was reinforced with tanks from the 1st Tank Army, the 2nd Guards Tank Corps and the 5th Guards Tank Corps. The 51st and 90th Guards Rifle Divisions were moved up to the vicinity of Pokrovka (not Prokhorovka, site of one of future confrontations, 40 kilometres (25 mi) to the north-east), in the path of the 1st SS Panzer Division. The 93rd Guards Rifle Division was deployed further back, along the road leading from Pokrovka to Prokhorovka.

==== Army Detachment Kempf ====
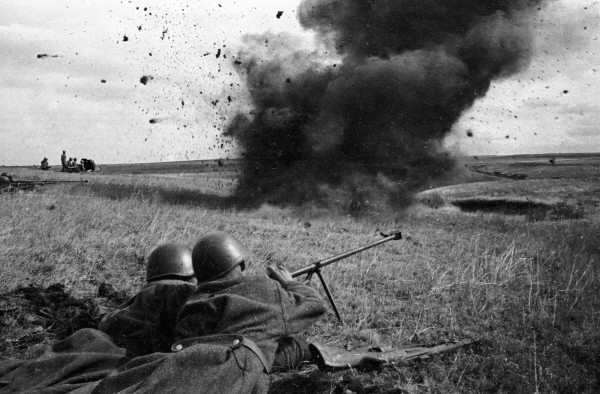
Soviet PTRD anti-tank rifle team during the fighting

Facing Army Detachment Kempf, consisting of III Panzer Corps and Corps Raus (commanded by Erhard Raus), were the 7th Guards Army, dug in on the high ground on the eastern bank of the Northern Donets. The two German corps were tasked with crossing the river, breaking through the 7th Guards Army and covering the right flank of the 4th Panzer Army. The 503rd Heavy Tank Battalion, equipped with 45 Tigers, was also attached to the III Panzer Corps, with one company of 15 Tigers attached to each of the corps' three panzer divisions.

At the Milkhailovka bridgehead, just south of Belgorod, eight infantry battalions of the 6th Panzer Division crossed the river under heavy Soviet bombardment. Part of a company of Tigers from the 503rd Heavy Tank Battalion was able to cross before the bridge was destroyed. The rest of the 6th Panzer Division was unable to cross further south due to a traffic jam at the crossing, and remained on the western bank of the river throughout the day. Those units of the division that had crossed the river attacked Stary Gorod, but were unable to break through due to poorly cleared minefields and strong resistance.

To the south of the 6th Panzer Division, the 19th Panzer Division crossed the river but was delayed by mines, moving forward 8 kilometres (5.0 mi) by the end of the day. The Luftwaffe bombed the bridgehead in a friendly fire incident, wounding 6th Panzer Division commander Walther von Hünersdorff and Hermann von Oppeln-Bronikowski of the 19th Panzer Division. Further south, infantry and tanks of 7th Panzer Division crossed the river. A new bridge had to be built specifically for the Tigers, causing further delays. Despite a poor start, the 7th Panzer Division eventually broke into the first belt of the Soviet defence and pushed on between Razumnoe and Krutoi Log, advancing 10 kilometres (6.2 mi), the furthest Kempf got during the day.

Operating to the south of 7th Panzer Division, were the 106th Infantry Division and the 320th Infantry Division of Corps Raus. The two formations attacked across a 32 kilometres (20 mi) front without armour support. The advance began well, with the crossing of the river and a swift advance against the 72nd Guards Rifle Division. Corps Raus took the village of Maslovo Pristani, penetrating the first Red Army defence line. A Soviet counterattack supported by about 40 tanks was beaten off, with the assistance from artillery and flak batteries. After having suffered 2,000 casualties since the morning and still facing considerable resistance from the Soviet forces, the corps dug in for the night.

Delaying the progress of Kempf allowed Red Army forces time to prepare their second belt of defence to meet the German attack on 6 July. The 7th Guards Army, which had absorbed the attack of III Panzer Corps and Corps Raus, was reinforced with two rifle divisions from the reserve. The 15th Guards Rifle Division was moved up to the second belt of defence, in the path of the III Panzer Corps.

=== Development of the battle ===
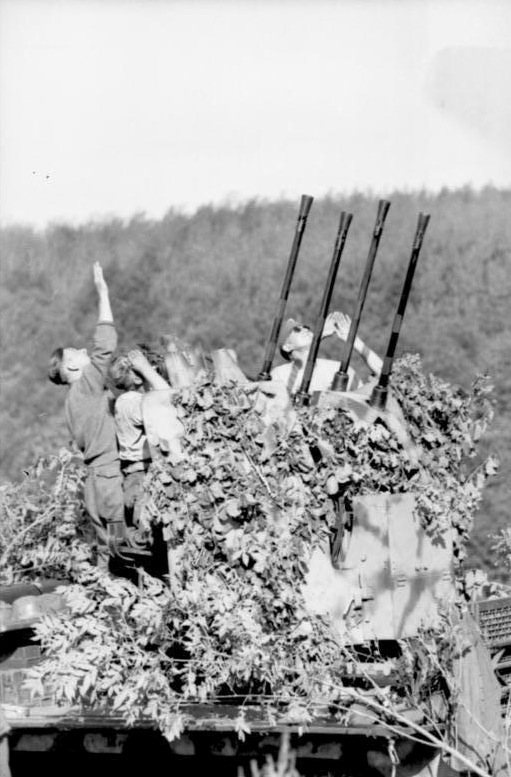
Luftwaffe flak unit

By the evening of 6 July, the Voronezh Front had committed all of its reserves, except for three rifle divisions under the 69th Army; yet it could not decisively contain the 4th Panzer Army. The XLVIII Panzer Corps along the Oboyan axis, where the third defensive belt was mostly unoccupied, now had only the Red Army second defensive belt blocking it from breakthrough into the unfortified Soviet rear. This forced the Stavka to commit their strategic reserves to reinforce the Voronezh Front: the 5th Guards and 5th Guards Tank Armies, both from the Steppe Front, as well as the 2nd Tank Corps from the Southwestern Front. Ivan Konev objected to this premature piecemeal commitment of the strategic reserve, but a personal call from Stalin silenced his complaints. In addition, on 7 July Zhukov ordered the 17th Air Army – the air fleet serving the Southwestern Front – to support the 2nd Air Army in serving the Voronezh Front. On July 7, the 5th Guards Tank Army began advancing to Prokhorovka. 5th Guards Tank Army commander, Lieutenant General Pavel Rotmistrov, described the journey:

By midday, the dust rose in thick clouds, settling in a solid layer on roadside bushes, grain fields, tanks and trucks. The dark red disc of the sun was hardly visible. Tanks, self-propelled guns, artillery tractors, armoured personnel carriers and trucks were advancing in an unending flow. The faces of the soldiers were dark with dust and exhaust fumes. It was intolerably hot. Soldiers were tortured by thirst and their shirts, wet with sweat, stuck to their bodies.

The 10th Tank Corps, then still subordinate to the 5th Guards Army, was rushed ahead of the rest of the army, arriving at Prokhorovka on the night of 7 July, and 2nd Tank Corps arrived at Korocha, 40 km (25 mi) southeast of Prokhorovka, by morning of 8 July. Vatutin ordered a powerful counterattack by the 5th Guards, 2nd Guards, 2nd and 10th Tank Corps, in all fielding about 593 tanks and self-propelled guns and supported by most of the Front's available air power, which aimed to defeat the II SS Panzer Corps and therefore expose the right flank of XLVIII Panzer Corps. Simultaneously, the 6th Tank Corps was to attack the XLVIII Panzer Corps and prevent it from breaking through to the free Soviet rear. Although intended to be concerted, the counterattack turned out to be a series of piecemeal attacks due to poor coordination. The 10th Tank Corps' attack began on the dawn of 8 July but they ran straight into the antitank fire of the 2nd and 3rd SS Divisions, losing most of its forces. Later that morning, the 5th Guards Tank Corps' attack was repelled by the 3rd SS Division. The 2nd Tank Corps joined in the afternoon and was also repelled. The 2nd Guards Tank Corps, masked by the forest around the village Gostishchevo, 16 km (10 mi) north of Belgorod, with its presence unknown to the II SS Panzer Corps, advanced towards the 167th Infantry Division. But it was detected by German air reconnaissance just before the attack had materialized, and was subsequently decimated by German ground-attack aircraft armed with MK 103 anti-tank cannons and at least 50 tanks were destroyed. This marked the first time in military history, an attacking tank formation had been defeated by air power alone. Although a fiasco, the Soviet counterattack succeeded in stalling the advance of the II SS Panzer Corps throughout the day.

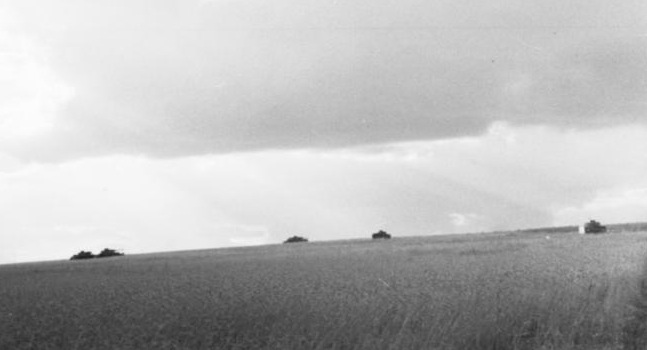
Thunderclouds over the battleground. Intermittent heavy rains created mud and marsh that made movement difficult.

By the end of 8 July, II SS-Panzer Corps had advanced about 29 kilometres (18 mi) since the start of Citadel and broken through the first and second defensive belts. However, slow progress by the XLVIII Panzer Corps caused Hoth to shift elements of the II SS-Panzer Corps to the west to help the XLVIII Panzer Corps regain its momentum. On 10 July the full effort of the corps was shifted back to its own forward progress. The direction of their advance now shifted from Oboyan due north to the northeast, toward Prokhorovka. Hoth had discussed this move with Manstein since early May, and it was a part of the 4th Panzer Army's plan since the outset of the offensive. By this time, however, the Soviets had shifted reserve formations into its path. The defensive positions were manned by the 2nd Tank Corps, reinforced by the 9th Guards Airborne Division and 301st Anti-Tank Artillery Regiment, both from the 33rd Guards Rifle Corps.

Though the German advance in the south was slower than planned, it was faster than the Soviets expected. On 9 July, the first German units reached the Psel River. The next day, the first German infantry crossed the river. Despite the deep defensive system and minefields, German tank losses remained lower than the Soviet's. At this point, Hoth turned the II SS Panzer Corps away from Oboyan to attack toward the northeast in the direction of Prokhorovka. The main concern of Manstein and Hausser was the inability of Army Detachment Kempf to advance and protect the eastern flank of the II SS Panzer Corps. On 11 July, Army Detachment Kempf finally achieved a breakthrough. In a surprise night attack, the 6th Panzer Division seized a bridge across the Donets. Once across, Breith made every effort to push troops and vehicles across the river for an advance on Prokhorovka from the south. A linkup with the II SS Panzer Corps would result with the Soviet 69th Army becoming encircled.

=== Battle of Prokhorovka ===
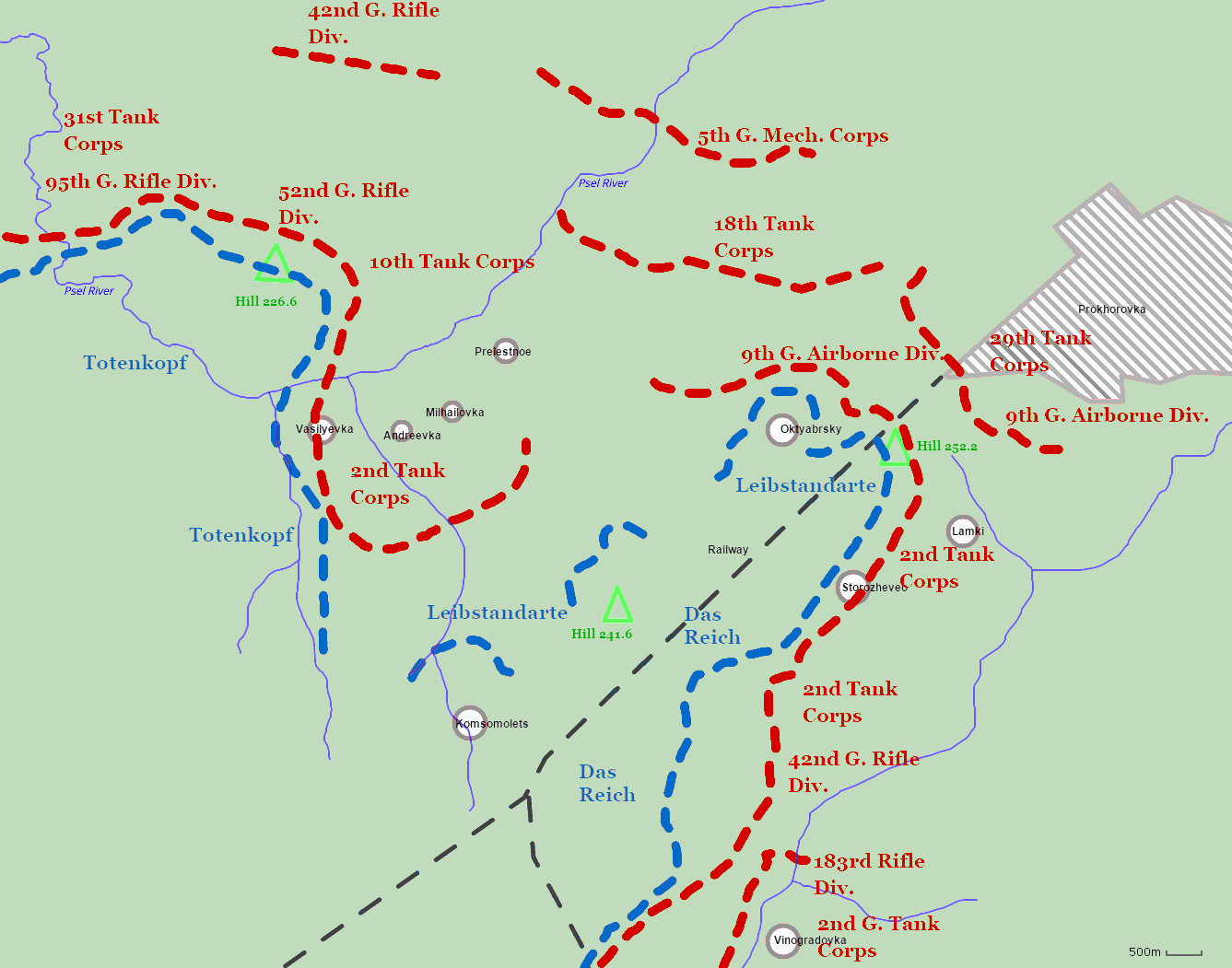
Disposition of Soviet and German forces around Prokhorovka on the eve of the battle on 12 July

Throughout 10 and 11 July, the II SS Panzer Corps continued its attack toward Prokhorovka, reaching within 3 kilometres (1.9 mi) of the settlement by the night of 11 July. That same night, Hausser issued orders for the attack to continue the next day. The plan was for the 3rd SS Panzer Division to drive northeast until it reached the Karteschewka-Prokhorovka road. Once there, they were to strike southeast to attack the Soviet positions at Prokhorovka from the flanks and rear. The 1st and 2nd SS Panzer divisions were to wait until 3rd SS Panzer Division attack had destabilised the Soviet positions at Prokhorovka; and once underway, the 1st SS Panzer Division was to attack the main Soviet defences dug in on the slopes southwest of Prokhorovka. To the division's right, the 2nd SS Panzer Division was to advance eastward, then turn southward away from Prokhorovka to roll up the Soviet lines opposing the III Panzer Corps' advance and force a gap. During the night of 11 July, Rotmistrov moved his 5th Guards Tank Army to an assembly area just behind Prokhorovka in preparation for a massive attack the following day. At 5:45 Leibstandarte headquarters started receiving reports of the ominous sound of tank engines as the Soviets moved into their assembly areas. Soviet artillery and Katyusha regiments were redeployed in preparation for the counterattack.

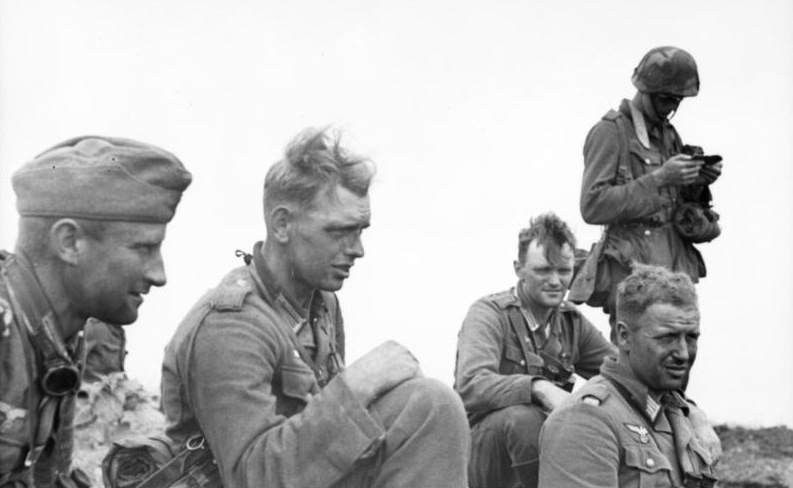
German soldiers pause during the fighting.

At around 08:00, a Soviet artillery barrage began. At 08:30, Rotmistrov radioed his tankers: "Steel, Steel, Steel!", the order to commence the attack. Down off the west slopes, before Prokhorovka, came the massed armour of five tank brigades from the Soviet 18th and 29th Tank Corps of the 5th Guards Tank Army. The Soviet tanks advanced down the corridor, carrying mounted infantrymen of the 9th Guards Airborne Division on the tanks. To the north and east, the 3rd SS Panzer Division was engaged by the Soviet 33rd Guards Rifle Corps. Tasked with flanking the Soviet defences around Prokhorovka, the unit first had to beat off a number of attacks before they could go over onto the offensive. Most of the division's tank losses occurred late in the afternoon as they advanced through mine fields against well-hidden Soviet anti-tank guns.

Although the 3rd SS succeeded in reaching the Karteschewka-Prokhorovka road, their hold was tenuous and it cost the division half of its armour. The majority of German tank losses suffered at Prokhorovka occurred here. To the south, the Soviet 18th and 29th Tank Corps had been thrown back by the 1st SS Panzer Division. The 2nd SS Panzer Division also repelled attacks from the 2nd Tank Corps and the 2nd Guards Tank Corps. The Luftwaffe local air superiority over the battlefield also contributed to the Soviet losses, partly due to the VVS (Voenno-Vozdushnye Sily – the Soviet Air Force) being directed against the German units on the flanks of II SS Panzer Corps. By the end of the day, the Soviets had fallen back to their starting positions.

Neither the 5th Guards Tank Army nor the II SS Panzer Corps accomplished their objectives. Though the Soviet counterattack failed with heavy losses, and were thrown back onto the defensive, yet they did enough to stop a German breakthrough.

== Termination of Operation Citadel ==
On the evening of 12 July, Hitler summoned Kluge and Manstein to his headquarters at Rastenburg in East Prussia. Two days earlier, the Western Allies had invaded Sicily. The threat of further Allied landings in Italy or along southern France made Hitler believe it was essential to move forces from Kursk to Italy and to discontinue the offensive. Kluge welcomed the news, as he was aware that the Soviets were initiating a massive offensive against his sector, but Manstein was less welcoming. Manstein's forces had just spent a week fighting through a maze of defensive works and he believed they were on the verge of breaking through to more open terrain, which would allow him to engage and destroy the Soviet armoured reserves in a mobile battle. Manstein stated "On no account should we let go of the enemy until the mobile reserves he [has] committed [are] completely beaten." Hitler agreed to temporarily allow the continuance of the offensive in the southern part of the salient, but the following day he ordered Manstein's reserve – the XXIV Panzer Corps – to move south to support the 1st Panzer Army. This removed the force Manstein believed was needed to succeed.

The offensive continued in the southern part with the launch of Operation Roland on 14 July. But after three days, on 17 July, the II SS Panzer Corps was ordered to end its offensive operations and begin withdrawing. This marked the end of Operation Roland. One of the panzer corps' divisions was transferred to Italy and the other two were sent south to meet new Soviet offensives. The strength of the Soviet reserve formations had been greatly underestimated by German intelligence, and the Red Army soon went onto the offensive. In his post-war memoirs Lost Victories, Manstein was highly critical of Hitler's decision to call off the operation at the height of the tactical battle. The veracity of Manstein's claims of a near victory is debatable. The extent of Soviet reserves was far greater than he realised. These reserves were used to re-equip the mauled 5th Guards Tank Army, which launched Operation Rumyantsev a couple of weeks later. The result was a battle of attrition for which the Germans were ill-prepared and which they had little chance of winning.

During Operation Citadel, Luftwaffe units in the area made 27,221 flying sorties with 193 combat losses (0.709% loss rate per sortie). Soviet units from 5 July to 8 July made 11,235 flying sorties with combat losses of 556 aircraft (4.95% per sortie). From a tactical perspective, this might have been viewed as a success for the Germans, as they were surely destroying Soviet armor and aircraft with a better kill ratio of 1:6. The problem was that then the Germans were lacking strategic reserves when Western air power began viciously devastating the Luftwaffe and penetrating into Italy. By the fall of 1943 just 25% of Luftwaffe day fighters were on the Eastern Front, ending any hopes of German air superiority in the east.

== Sources ==
- Beevor, Antony (2012). The Second World War. New York: Back Bay Books. ISBN 978-0-316-02374-0.
- Bergström, Christer (2007). Kursk — The Air Battle: July 1943. Hersham: Chevron/Ian Allan. ISBN 978-1-903223-88-8.
- Bergström, Christer (2008). Bagration to Berlin — The Final Air Battle in the East: 1941–1945. Burgess Hill: Chevron/Ian Allan. ISBN 978-1-903223-91-8.
- Barbier, Mary Kathryn (2002). Kursk: The Greatest Tank Battle, 1943. Zenith Imprint. ISBN 978-0-760312-54-4.
- Brand, Dieter (2003). "Vor 60 Jahren: Prochorowka (Teil II)". Österreichische Militärische Zeitschrift (in German) (6). Bundesministerium für Landesverteidigung und Sport. Archived from the original on 1 November 2014.
- Bauman, Walter (1998). Kursk Operation Simulation and Validation Exercise – Phase II (KOSAVE II). Maryland: US Army Concepts Analysis Agency. Archived from the original (PDF) on 20 June 2013. — A study of the southern sector of the Battle of Kursk conducted by the US Army Concepts Analysis Agency and directed by Walter J. Bauman, using data collected from military archives in Germany and Russia by The Dupuy Institute (TDI).
- Clark, Alan (1966). Barbarossa: The Russian-German Conflict 1941–1945. New York: Morrow. ISBN 0-688-04268-6. OCLC 40117106.
- Clark, Lloyd (2012). Kursk: The Greatest Battle: Eastern Front 1943. London: Headline Publishing Group. ISBN 978-0-7553-3639-5.
- Dunn, Walter (1997). Kursk: Hitler's Gamble, 1943. Westport, Conn: Greenwood Press. ISBN 978-0-275-95733-9.
- Frieser, Karl-Heinz; Schmider, Klaus; Schönherr, Klaus; Schreiber, Gerhard; Ungváry, Kristián; Wegner, Bernd (2007). Die Ostfront 1943/44 – Der Krieg im Osten und an den Nebenfronten [The Eastern Front 1943–1944: The War in the East and on the Neighbouring Fronts]. Das Deutsche Reich und der Zweite Weltkrieg [Germany and the Second World War] (in German). Vol. VIII. München: Deutsche Verlags-Anstalt. ISBN 978-3-421-06235-2.
- Glantz, David M. (1989). Soviet Military Deception in the Second World War. London: Routledge. ISBN 978-0-7146-3347-3.
- Glantz, David M.; House, Jonathon (1995). When Titans Clashed: How the Red Army Stopped Hitler. Lawrence, Kansas: University of Kansas Press. ISBN 978-0-7006-0899-7.
- Glantz, David M.; Orenstein, Harold S. (1999). The Battle for Kursk 1943: The Soviet General Staff Study. London; Portland, OR: Frank Cass. ISBN 0-7146-4933-3. — This report, commissioned by the Soviet General Staff in 1944, was designed to educate the Red Army on how to conduct war operations. It was classified secret until its declassification in 1964, and was subsequently translated to English and edited by Orenstein and Glantz. Its original title was Collection of materials for the study of war experience, no. 11 (Russian: Сборник материалов по изучению опыта Великой Отечественной войны № 11, Sbornik materialov po izucheniiu opyta Velikoi Otechestvennoi voiny № 11)
- Glantz, David M.; House, Jonathan M. (2004) [1999]. The Battle of Kursk. Lawrence, Kansas: University Press of Kansas. ISBN 978-070061335-9.
- Glantz, David M. (2013). Soviet Military Intelligence in War. London: Taylor & Francis. ISBN 978-1-136-28934-7.
- Guderian, Heinz (1952). Panzer Leader. New York: Da Capo. ISBN 0-306-81101-4.
- Healy, Mark (1992). Kursk 1943: Tide Turns in the East. London: Osprey. ISBN 978-1-85532-211-0.
- Healy, Mark (2008). Zitadelle: The German Offensive Against the Kursk Salient 4–17 July 1943. Stroud, UK: The History Press. ISBN 978-1-85532-211-0.
- Healy, Mark (2010). Zitadelle: The German Offensive Against the Kursk Salient 4–17 July 1943. Stroud: History Press. ISBN 978-0-7524-5716-1.
- Jacobsen, Hans Adolf and Jürgen Rohwer Decisive battles of World War II; the German view. New York, NY: Putnam (1965) ISBN
- Kasdorf, Bruno (2000), The Battle of Kursk – An Analysis of Strategic and Operational Principles (PDF), U.S. Army War College
- Krivosheev, Grigoriy (1997). Soviet Casualties and Combat Losses in the Twentieth Century. London: Greenhill Books. ISBN 1-85367-280-7.
- Krivosheev, Grigoriy (2001). Россия и СССР в войнах XX века: Потери вооруженных сил: Статистическое исследование [Russia and the USSR in the Wars of the 20th Century: Loss of Armed Forces: Statistical Study] (in Russian). Moscow: Olma Press. ISBN 978-5-224-01515-3.
- Koltunov, G. A.; Solov'ev, B. G. (1970). Kurskaya bitva [Kurskaya Battle] (in Russian). Moskva: Voen. izd-vo Ministerstva oboronȳ SSSR. OCLC 1180810844.
- Manstein, Erich von (1983) [1955]. Verlorene Siege [Lost Victories] (in German). München: Monch. ISBN 978-3-7637-5051-1.
- Münch, Karlheinz (1997). Combat History of Schwere Panzerjäger Abteilung 653: Formerly the Sturmgeschütz Abteilung 197 1940–1942. Winnipeg: J. J. Fedorowicz Publishing. ISBN 0-921991-37-1.
- Newton, Steven (2002). Kursk: The German View. Cambridge: Da Capo Press. ISBN 0-306-81150-2.
- Nipe, George (1998). "Kursk Reconsidered: Germany's Lost Victory". Archived from the original on 10 August 2015.
- Nipe, George (2011). Blood, Steel, and Myth: The II. SS-Panzer-Korps and the Road to Prochorowka, July 1943. Southbury, Conn: Newbury. ISBN 978-0-9748389-4-6.
- Overy, Richard (1995). Why the Allies Won. New York: Norton Press. ISBN 978-0-393-03925-2.
- Yeide, Harry (2014). Fighting Patton: George S. Patton Jr. Through the Eyes of His Enemies. Zenith Press. ISBN 978-0760345924.
- Zamulin, Valeriy (2011). Demolishing the Myth: The Tank Battle at Prokhorovka, Kursk, July 1943: An Operational Narrative. Solihull: Helion & Company. ISBN 978-1-906033-89-7.
- Zetterling, Niklas; Frankson, Anders (2000). Kursk 1943: A Statistical Analysis. Cass Series on the Soviet (Russian) Study of War. London: Frank Cass. ISBN 0-7146-5052-8.
- Ziemke, Earl F. (1996) [1968]. Stalingrad to Berlin: The German Defeat in the East. New York, US: Barnes & Noble. ISBN 0-88029-059-5.
