= Army East Prussia (Wehrmacht) =

- German: Armee Ostpreußen
- Active: 7 April – 9 May 1945
- Country: Nazi Germany
- Branch: German army ( Wehrmacht)
- Type: Army
- Engagements: World War II: East Prussian Offensive

Commanders
- Notable commanders: Dietrich von Saucken

Army East Prussia (German: Armee Ostpreußen) was created from the AOK 2nd Army and also absorbed the remnants of the 4th Army on 7 April 1945. AOK Ostpreußen controlled all the troops in East Prussia and the Reichsgau Danzig-West Prussia. After the loss of the cities of Danzig and Gotenhafen in the East Prussian Offensive the army had been isolated in the Bay of Gdansk.

== Commanding officers ==
=== Commander-in-Chief ===
No.	Portrait	Commander	Took office	Left office	Time in office
1	Dietrich von Saucken	General der Panzertruppe; Dietrich von Saucken (1892–1980)	7 April 1945	9 May 1945	32 days

=== Chief of the General Staff ===
- Generalmajor Robert Macher

=== 1st Operations officer ===
- Oberstleutnant i.G. Wolfgang Brennecke

== Composition ==
- VI Corps (General Horst Großmann)
- XXVI Corps (General Gerhard Matzky)
- Generalkommando Hela
- XXIII Corps (General Walter Melzer)
- LV Corps / 'Fortress Pillau' (Lieutenant-General Kurt Chill)
- IX Corps (General Rolf Wuthmann)
- XVIII Mountain Corps (General Friedrich Hochbaum)
- 102nd Infantry Division
- Division z.b.V. 607
- 10. Radfahr-Jäger-Brigade
