= Greater German Reich =

Greater German Reich (German: Großdeutsches Reich) may refer to:

- Nazi Germany, the official state name of which was "Greater German Reich" from 1943 to 1945 (also used informally after the 1938 Anschluss of Austria)
  - Greater Germanic Reich, the official state name of the political entity that Nazi Germany tried to establish in Europe during World War II (fully styled the Greater Germanic Reich of the German Nation)
- Greater Germany, the political concept of creating a German nation-state encompassing all or nearly all the German-speaking peoples of Europe in the 19th and 20th centuries

== See also ==
- Großdeutschland (disambiguation)
