= Georg Jauer =

German general (1896–1971)

- Born: 25 June 1896; Lissen, German Empire
- Died: 5 August 1971 (aged 75); Greven, West Germany
- Military career
- Allegiance: German Empire; Weimar Republic; Nazi Germany
- Branch: German Army
- Service years: 1914–1945
- Rank: General der Panzertruppe
- Commands: 20th Panzer Grenadier Division; 25th Panzer Division; Panzer Corps Großdeutschland
- Conflicts: World War I World War II
- Awards: Knight's Cross of the Iron Cross with Oak Leaves

Georg Jauer (25 June 1896 – 5 August 1971) was a general in the Wehrmacht of Nazi Germany during World War II. He was a recipient of the Knight's Cross of the Iron Cross with Oak Leaves.

At the outbreak of World War II Jauer served as a staff officer and regimental commander. In April 1943 he was appointed commander the 20th Motorized Infantry and 20th Panzer Grenadier Division and took part in the Battle of the Kamenets-Podolsky pocket. He then led the 25th Panzer Division at the Battle of Kiev. On 12 March 1945 he took command of the 'Panzer Corps Großdeutschland' with which he surrendered.

== Awards ==
- Iron Cross (1914) 2nd Class and 1st Class
- Wound Badge (1914) in Black
- Honour Cross of the World War 1914/1918
- Clasp to the Iron Cross (1939) 2nd Class (2 July 1941) and 1st Class (20 July 1941)
- German Cross in Gold on 19 December 1941 as Oberst in Artillerie-Regiment 29
- Knight's Cross of the Iron Cross with Oak Leaves
  - Knight's Cross on 4 May 1944 as Generalleutnant and commander of 20. Panzergrenadier-Division
  - Oak Leaves on 10 February 1945 as Generalleutnant and commander of 20. Panzergrenadier-Division

Military offices
Preceded by Generalleutnant Erich Jaschke	Commander of 20. Panzergrenadier-Division; 3 January 1943 – 1 January 1945	Succeeded by Generalmajor Georg Scholze
Preceded by Generalleutnant Adolf von Schell	Commander of 25. Panzer-Division; 15 November 1943 – 21 November 1943	Succeeded by Generalleutnant Hans Tröger
Preceded by General der Panzertruppe Dietrich von Saucken	Commander of Panzerkorps Großdeutschland; 12 February 1945 – 8 May 1945	Succeeded by None
