= Pakfront =

German anti tank gun tactic

The Pakfront was a defensive military tactic developed by the German forces on the Eastern Front during the Second World War. It was named after the phonetic pronunciation of the acronym nomenclature for German towed anti-tank guns, PaK (PanzerabwehrKanone, "tank defense cannon"). The Soviets soon copied the tactic, and used it to great effect at the Battle of Kursk in July 1943.

== German tactic ==
During the large Soviet armoured attacks on the Eastern front in late 1941–1942, the Germans quickly realised that their anti-tank guns, operating individually or in small groups, and with no central commander, were quickly overwhelmed.

The pakfront was developed to counter this. A group of up to ten guns were placed under the command of one officer. He was responsible for designating targets and directing the fire of his guns. This allowed the Germans to spring particularly effective anti-tank ambushes, with all guns being assigned separate targets and then firing at once, maximizing surprise and minimizing the chance for return fire.

== Soviet tactic ==
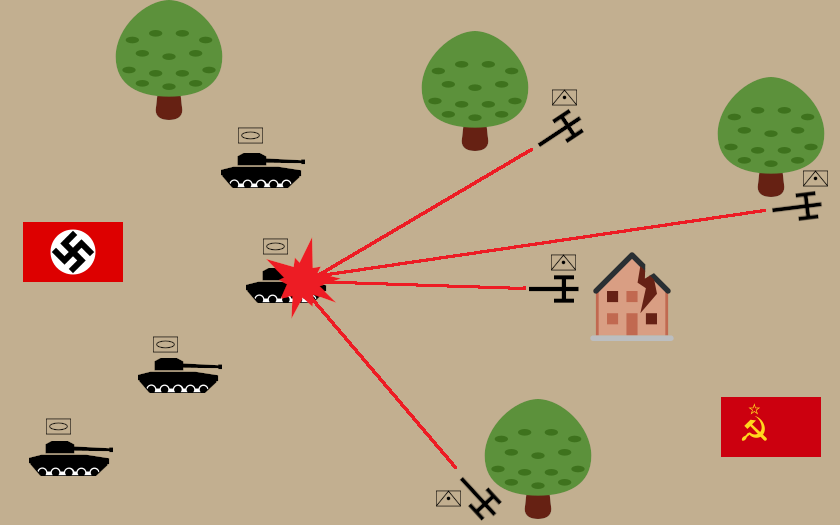
Basic Soviet Pakfront doctrine: A platoon of German tanks enters an area defended by camouflaged Soviet anti-tank artillery. Radio is used to co-ordinate simultaneous fire upon a single vehicle, hopefully resulting in a "catastrophic kill"

The tactic was found to be extremely effective, and soon the Soviets had copied it, often using multiple pakfronts in concert with minefields, anti-tank ditches, and other obstacles to channel the enemy armour into their fields of fire. The size and efficiency of such defenses was directly proportional to the amount of time granted to prepare them, with one report commenting it was not uncommon for the Red Army to lay 30,000 mines in a sector within two or three days. Since the 1930s, Soviet doctrine had been to employ large numbers of anti-tank guns in areas, but the German tactic enabled them to better exploit their numbers as well as Russian expertise in camouflage. A German tank commander commented that minefields and pakfronts could not be detected until the trap was sprung. Mines protecting pakfronts were particularly effective due to the Germans' lack of specialized mine clearing vehicles.

The Soviets also developed an extension of the ambush tactic in which all the guns would target one particularly valuable or heavily armored target and fire on command, the combined impacts essentially guaranteeing an instant kill. This technique was especially effective against German command tanks because it generally caused a catastrophic kill ("K-kill") that minimized any chance for the command team to escape, and heavy tanks like the Tiger I that might have otherwise needed dozens of separate hits to disable. To counter the effectiveness of the Soviet pakfront, the Germans developed the panzerkeil ("armoured wedge"), but this offensive tactic had limited effectiveness.

The Soviet method of employing pakfronts included establishing "anti-tank zones" (Russian: противотанковые районы protivotankovyje rajony) in staggered patterns with multiple pak-groups' ("anti-tank base-of-fire points", Russian: противотанковые опорные пункты protivotankovyje opornyje punkty) firing sectors intertwined, to amplify the effect of the tactic.

By 1943, Soviet doctrine was to protect any new gains with pakfronts to defeat the inevitable German counterattack as the Germans attempted to regain lost territory and initiative.

At the Battle of Kursk in July 1943, Soviet pakfronts slowed the German attack in the south and completely halted the northern German force. The panzerkeil was shown to be an inadequate countermeasure. The long preparation period afforded to the Red Army allowed for the salient to achieve unprecedented size and sophistication.
