= Georg Scholze =

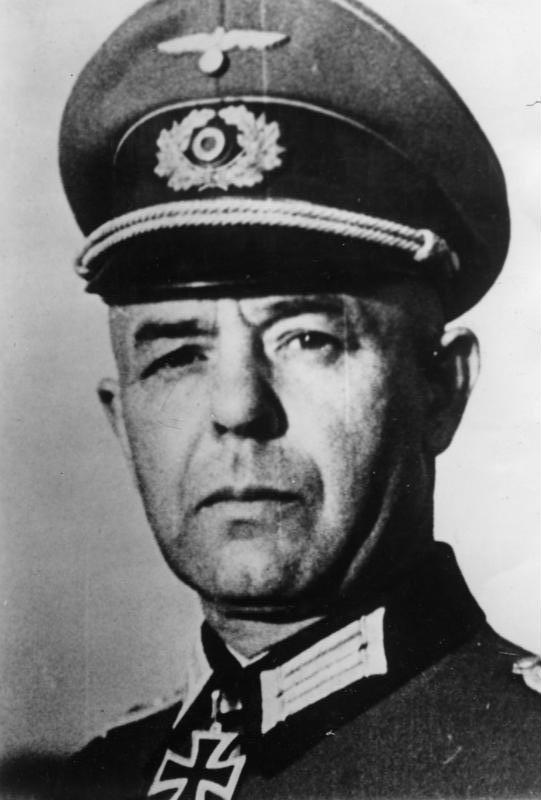
- Born: 21 August 1897
- Died: 23 April 1945 (aged 47); Berlin
- Military career
- Allegiance: German Empire (to 1918); Nazi Germany
- Branch: Army (Wehrmacht)
- Service years: 1914–18; 1934–45
- Rank: Generalmajor
- Commands: 20th Infantry Division
- Conflicts: World War I World War II: Battle of France; Operation Barbarossa; Battle of Białystok–Minsk; Battle of Smolensk (1941); Battle of Moscow; Battles of Rzhev; Operation Little Saturn; Third Battle of Kharkov; Italian Campaign; Vistula–Oder Offensive; Lower Silesian Offensive; Battle of Berlin
- Awards: Knight's Cross of the Iron Cross

Georg Scholze (21 August 1897 – 23 April 1945) was a German general during World War II. He was also a recipient of the Knight's Cross of the Iron Cross of Nazi Germany. Commander of the 20th Panzergrenadier Division since January 1945, Scholze committed suicide on 23 April 1945 in Berlin.

== Awards and decorations ==
- Knight's Cross of the Iron Cross on 17 February 1943 as Oberst and commander of Infanterie-Lehr-Regiment

Military offices
| Preceded by Generalleutnant Georg Jauer | Commander of 20. Panzergrenadier-Division; 1 January 1945 - 23 April 1945 | Succeeded by None |
