= 20th Infantry Division (Wehrmacht) =

20th Infantry Division 20th Panzergrenadier Division
- 20. Infanterie-Division; 20. Panzergrenadier-Division
- Unit Insignia
- Active: 1 October 1934 – 8 May 1945
- Country: Nazi Germany
- Branch: German Army
- Type: Panzergrenadier
- Role: Maneuver warfare Raiding
- Size: Division
- Garrison/HQ: Hamburg
- Engagements: World War II: Kamenets-Podolsky pocket; Battle of Berlin

The German 20th Infantry Division was an infantry division of Nazi Germany.

== History ==
It was established in 1934 under the cover name Reichswehrdienststelle Hamburg, and did not assume its bona-fide designation until the creation of the Wehrmacht was announced in October 1935. In the autumn of 1937 it was upgraded to a fully motorized division.

As the 20th Motorized Infantry Division the unit took part in the invasion of Poland as part of Heinz Guderian's XIX Corps. During that campaign the motorized divisions were found to be somewhat unwieldy, so afterward the 20th and other motorized divisions were reorganized to reduce their size by about a third, leaving them with six motorized infantry battalions organized into two regiments, plus ordinary divisional support units.

In May 1940 the division took part in the invasion of France, and remained there on occupation duty until April 1941, except for one brief period on reserve in Germany. In June 1941 it joined Operation Barbarossa under Army Group Centre. In September it was transferred to Army Group North, and it spent most of 1942 on the Volkhov Front. In December it was transferred back to Army Group Centre for the relief attempt at the Battle of Velikiye Luki.

In July 1943 it was redesignated as 20th Panzergrenadier Division but it did not immediately receive an assault gun battalion to support its infantry. The 8th Panzer Battalion (comprising 42 StuG III) was assigned to it in October 1943 and departed for Army Group South in November 1943. However, when the battalion arrived in December 1943 it was instead used as a fire brigade during the battle for western Ukraine. The battalion finally joined the 20th Panzergrenadier Division in June 1944. The division remained on the Eastern Front for the remainder of the war and ended the war fighting in the Battle of Berlin under the LVI Panzer Corps.

On 1 January 1945, the 20th Panzergrenadier Division, then under 4th Panzer Army of Army Group A, had a numerical strength of 14,484 men, and was thus the largest division of its army and second-largest division (after 19th Panzer Division) in the entire army group in terms of manpower.

== Commanding officers ==
=== 20th Infantry Division (mot.) ===
- General der Infanterie Mauritz von Wiktorin, 10 November 1938 – 10 November 1940
- General der Infanterie Hans Zorn, 10 November 1940 – 12 January 1942
- Generalleutnant Erich Jaschke, 12 January 1942 – 3 January 1943
- Generalmajor Georg Jauer, 3 January 1943 – 23 July 1943

=== 20th Panzergrenadier-Division ===
- Generalleutnant Georg Jauer, 23 July 1943 – 1 September 1944
- Oberst Dr. Walter Kühn, (i.V.) 1 Sep 1944 – September 1944
- Generalleutnant Georg Jauer, September 1944 – 1 January 1945)
- Generalmajor Georg Scholze, 1 January 1945 – 23 April 1945
