= 29th Tank Corps =

Tank corps of the Soviet military

- Active: 1943–1945
- Country: Soviet Union
- Branch: Red Army
- Engagements: World War II; Battle of Prokhorovka; Belgorod-Kharkov Offensive; Battle of the Dnieper; Dnieper–Carpathian Offensive; East Prussian Offensive
- Decorations: Order of Lenin; Order of the Red Banner; Order of Suvorov, 2nd class
- Battle honours: Znamianka

Commanders
- Notable commanders: Ivan Kirichenko; Yevgeny Fominykh

The 29th Tank Corps was a tank corps of the Soviet Union's Red Army. Formed in February 1943, the corps served through the entire war, fighting in the Battle of Prokhorovka, the Belgorod-Kharkov Offensive, the Battle of the Dnieper, the Dnieper–Carpathian Offensive, Operation Bagration, and the East Prussian Offensive. After the war ended, it was converted into a tank division.

== Formation ==
The corps began forming on 22 February 1943 at the Moscow Armored Training Center near Naro-Fominsk, and soon became part of the new 5th Guards Tank Army. The 29th included the 25th, 31st, and 32nd Tank Brigades, the 53rd Motor Rifle Brigade, the 271st Mortar Regiment, and other smaller units, and was commanded by Major General Fyodor Anikushkin. Its chief of staff was Colonel Yevgeny Fominykh. The corps' three tank brigades were battle-hardened, but the others were newly formed and had not yet seen combat. On 2 March, Colonel Ivan Kirichenko became the corps commander. By 12 March, the corps concentrated 30 kilometers southwest of Millerovo, where it was joined by combat support units and received reinforcements. On 19 March, the entire army was ordered by Stavka to concentrate near Ostrogozhsk by 24 March, in a march taking place during the spring rasputitsa.

After reaching the Ostrogozhsk area, the corps began intensive combat training on 1 April in anticipation of upcoming operations. In early May, army commander Lieutenant General Pavel Rotmistrov reorganized the tank brigades in order to create a strong corps reserve to repel unexpected enemy tank attacks and develop the breakthrough, the 32nd Brigade was equipped with only T-34 medium tanks, consisting of two battalions with three companies each, a total of 65 tanks. The 32nd's T-70 light tanks were transferred to the 25th and 31st Brigades, which also had a two-battalion structure, with the first battalion equipped with T-34s and the second battalion with T-70s. The corps was completely formed by 10 May after it was joined by the 14th Guards Heavy Tank Regiment and the 108th Anti-tank Artillery Regiment. On 30 May, the corps' brigades and the 271st Mortar Regiment received their battle flags in a ceremony.

== Battle of Prokhorovka ==
T-34s of the corps in start positions during the Battle of Prokhorovka

In two separate marches, first during the day on 7 July, and second on the night of 9 July, the corps covered a combined distance of 300 kilometers to reach its starting positions in the ravines to the north of Prokhorovka. The corps then fought in the Battle of Prokhorovka, a Soviet counterattack during the Battle of Kursk.

== Postwar ==
On 10 June 1945, the 29th Tank Corps was converted into the 29th Tank Division, and its brigades became regiments.

The division served through the Cold War with the 5th Guards Tank Army in the Belorussian Military District, being referred to by the Military Unit Number 28390. By the 1980s it was being maintained as a "Not Ready Division - High-Strength Cadre;" in 1985 it had only 2150 men assigned.

The division was disbanded in July 1990 (Holm/Feskov) or August 1990. Feskov et al. 2013 says that it became the 6313th Base for Storage of Weapons and Equipment while divisional history sites say rather than the 6297th Property Storage Base (Russian: 6297 база хранения имущества (БХИ)) was formed on its basis, with "limited tasks and capabilities." The division then became part of the Armed Forces of Belarus on the dissolution of the Soviet Union. By the end of 1992 the 6297th Base had become the 29th Base for Storage of Weapons and Equipment (BKhVT), and the honorific "Znamenskaya" and the military awards of the 29th Tank Division were transferred to it. The main purpose of the BKhVT was to store weapons, military equipment and stocks of materiel, as well as organizing and conducting training camps and planned training of assigned personnel in connection with mobilization. The base cooperated with the material-technical support elements of the 969th Central Tank Reserve Base to arrange "special" maintenance facilities. The 29th Base in Slutsk was equipped with a TKNT-3B modern computer simulator for main-gun training of three crews of T-72B tanks at the same time. A shooting range, a stadium, and electrified guard training classes were active at the 29th Base; Kulan writes that the base was "one of the best in the 5th Guards Army Corps."
