= Battle of Prokhorovka =

Part of Battle of Kursk, World War II (1943)

- Part of the Battle of Kursk on the Eastern Front of World War II
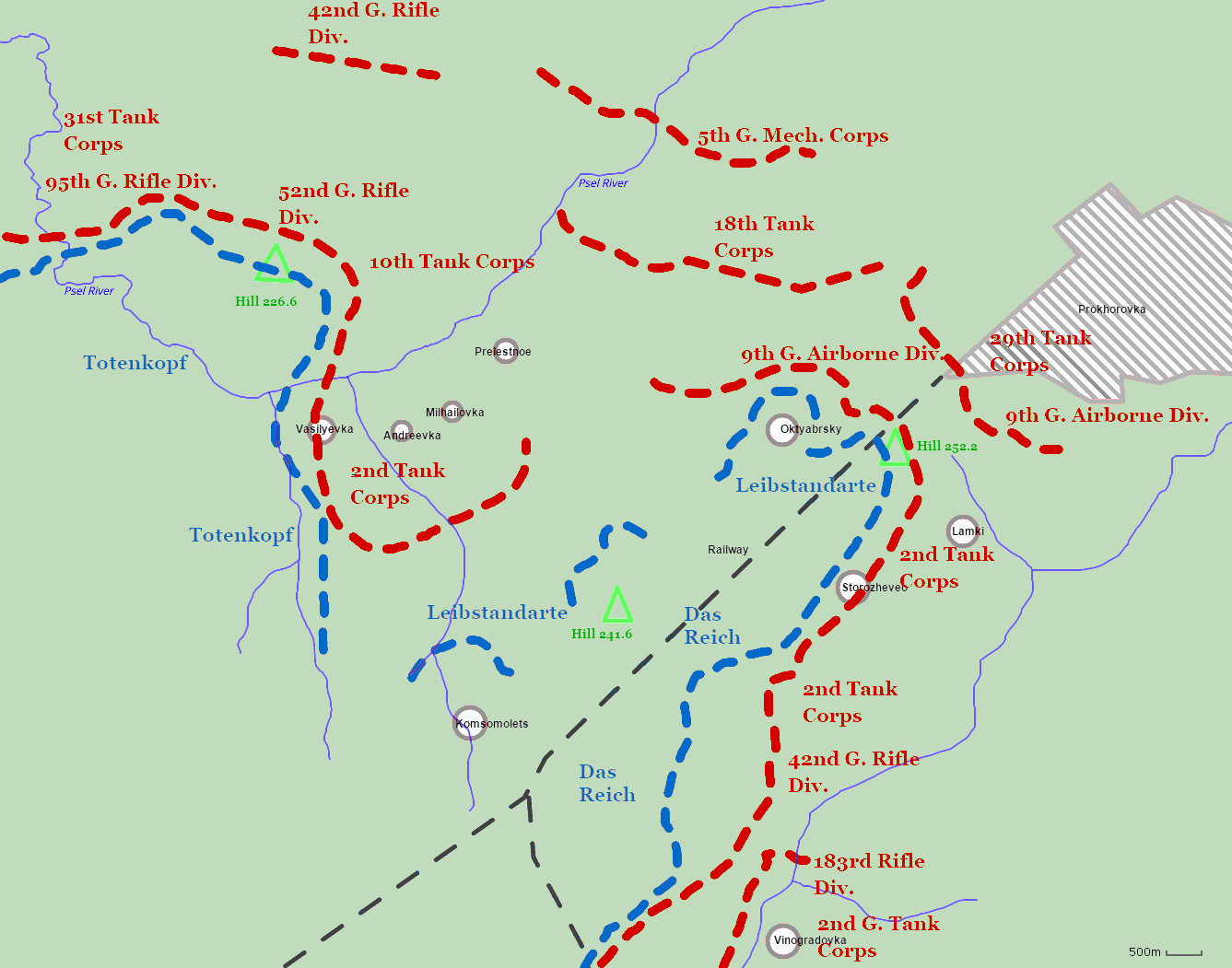
- Soviet and German deployments near Prokhorovka on the eve of the engagement of 12 July. Positions of the II SS-Panzer Corps are in blue. The red dashed line shows the position of Soviet forces directly opposing the SS-Panzer Corps. The black dashed line is the railway running from Prokhorovka southwest through the Psel corridor (the strip of land between the Psel River and a tributary of the Northern Donets River).
Date	12 July 1943 (Note: Historians attribute varying periods between 9 and 17 July as the duration of the battle (Zamulin 2011, p. 516; Glantz & House 2004, p. 151; Zetterling & Frankson 2000, p. 107; Nipe 1998), but the main tank engagement occurred on 12 July. On 9 July, the order to attack Prokhorovka was issued to the II SS-Panzer Corps, and the attack towards the town began the following morning on 10 July (Glantz & House 2004, p. 146; Clark 2012, pp. 337, 341). And on 17 July, the II SS-Panzer Corps was ordered to suspend all action in the Prokhorovka area and begin withdrawing out of the Kursk salient back to Belgorod (Glantz & House 2004, p. 223; Zetterling & Frankson 2000, p. 98).)
Location	Prokhorovka, Russian SFSR, Soviet Union 51°2′11″N 36°44′11″E
Result	See § Outcome

Belligerents
Germany	Soviet Union

Commanders and leaders
Hermann Hoth; Paul Hausser; Otto Deßloch	Nikolai Vatutin; Pavel Rotmistrov; Aleksey Zhadov; Stepan Krasovsky; Vladimir Sudets

Units involved
II SS-Panzer Corps: 1st SS-Panzergrenadier Division Leibstandarte SS Adolf Hitler; 2nd SS-Panzergrenadier Division Das Reich; 3rd SS-Panzergrenadier Division Totenkopf; 167th Infantry Division (elements of)	5th Guards Tank Army (Note: The 5th Guards Tank Army was transferred from the control of the Steppe Front to the Voronezh Front on 11 July. All of its subordinate corps as of 12 July are listed below; but the divisions, regiments and battalions directly subordinate to the Army's Headquarters are not listed.): 29th Tank Corps; 18th Tank Corps; 2nd Guards Tank Corps (Note: The 2nd Guards Tank Corps was initially not part of the 5th Guards Tank Army. It was transferred from the control of the 1st Tank Army to the 69th Army on 10 July, and then to the 5th Guards Tank Army on 11 July (Glantz & House 2004, p. 318).); 2nd Tank Corps (Note: The 2nd Tank Corps was initially not part of the 5th Guards Tank Army, but was transferred from the control of the Southwestern Front to the 5th Guards Tank Army on 11 July (Glantz & House 2004, p. 321). Due to earlier combat, by 12 July the 2nd Tank Corps had few tanks left, many of which were locked in combat elsewhere outside the battlefield of Prokhorovka and out of contact with their parent headquarters. Therefore, it was reinforced with the 10th Anti-Tank Brigade and relegated to a supportive role near Prokhorovka (Zetterling & Frankson 2000, p. 106; Glantz & House 2004, pp. 179, 181).); 5th Guards Mechanised Corps (Note: Two of the 5th Guards Mechanised Corps' four brigades – the 10th, 11th and 12th Guards Mechanised Brigades, and the 24th Guards Tank Brigade – were sent south to block the III Panzer Corps, leaving only its 10th Guards Mechanised and 24th Guards Tank Brigades near Prokhorovka on 12 July (Clark 2012, p. 379; Zetterling & Frankson 2000, p. 101; Glantz & House 2004, p. 321).); Other units: 33rd Guards Rifle Corps (Note: The 33rd Guards Rifle Corps was part of the 5th Guards Army, which was transferred from the control of the Steppe Front to the Voronezh Front on 8 July (Glantz & House 2004, p. 323). Of the army's two corps, only this one was present on the battlefield of Prokhorovka (Glantz & House 2004, p. 167). The other corps – the 32nd Guards Rifle Corps – was deployed further west, in the battlefield near Oboyan (Clark 2012, p. 230).); 10th Tank Corps (Note: The 10th Tank Corps was transferred from the control of the 5th Guards Army to the Voronezh Front on 7 July, and to the 1st Tank Army on 8 July (Glantz & House 2004, p. 324). Only its 11th Motorised Rifle Brigade was in the battlefield of Prokhorovka on 12 July (Glantz & House 2004, pp. 166, 195, 417).); 31st Tank Corps; 23rd Guards Rifle Corps (Note: The 23rd Guards Rifle Corps bore the brunt of the German offensive from the very first day. Its subordinate units present at the Battle of Prokhorovka were already depleted (Glantz & House 2004, pp. 94, 167).); 48th Rifle Corps; 95th Guards Rifle Division

Strength
294 tanks and assault guns (Note: see § Opposing forces.)	616 tanks and self-propelled guns

Casualties and losses
on 12 July (Note: See § Casualties and losses.): 43–80 tanks and assault guns destroyed or damaged; 842 men killed, wounded and missing; 19 aircraft destroyed or damaged	on 12 July: 340 tanks and self-propelled guns destroyed or damaged; 3,563 men killed, wounded and missing; 14 fighter aircraft
- Location of Prokhorovka within European Russia

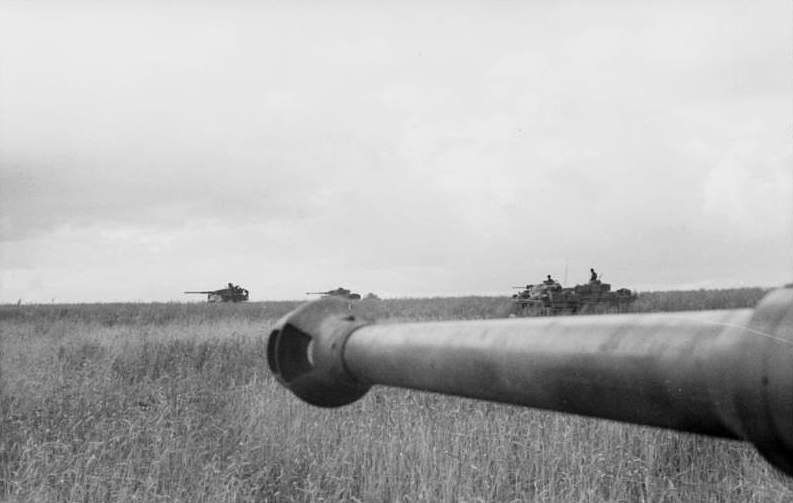
German tanks during Operation Citadel

The Battle of Prokhorovka was fought on 12 July 1943 near Prokhorovka, 87 kilometres (54 mi) southeast of Kursk, in the Soviet Union, during the Second World War. Taking place on the Eastern Front, the engagement was part of the wider Battle of Kursk and occurred when the 5th Guards Tank Army of the Soviet Red Army attacked the II SS-Panzer Corps of the German Waffen-SS in one of the largest tank battles in history. (Note: See § Misconceptions and disputes.)

In April 1943, the German leadership began preparing for Operation Citadel, with the objective of enveloping and destroying the Soviet forces in the Kursk salient by attacking and breaking through the base of the salient from north and south simultaneously. The German offensive was delayed several times because of the vacillation of the leadership (Hitler repeatedly delayed launching the attack so that more Tiger tanks could be delivered to the front, hoping that a technical advantage would help him win the offensive) and the addition of more forces and new equipment. The Soviet high command, Stavka, had learned of the German intentions and so used the delay to prepare a series of defensive belts along the routes of the planned German offensive. The Soviet leadership also massed several armies deep behind their defences as the Stavka Reserve. The army group, the Steppe Front, was to launch counteroffensives once the German strength had dissipated. The 5th Guards Tank Army was the primary armoured formation of the Steppe Front.

On 5 July 1943, the Wehrmacht launched its offensive. On the northern side of the salient, the German forces bogged down within four days. On the southern side, the German 4th Panzer Army, with Army Detachment Kempf on its eastern flank, attacked the Soviet defences of the Voronezh Front. They made slow but steady progress through the Soviet defensive lines.

After a week of fighting, the Soviets launched their counteroffensives: Operation Kutuzov on the northern side and a coinciding one on the southern side. On the southern side of the salient near Prokhorovka, the 5th Guards Tank Army engaged the II SS-Panzer Corps of the 4th Panzer Army, resulting in a large clash of armoured fighting vehicles. The 5th Guards Tank Army suffered significant losses in the attack, but succeeded in preventing the Wehrmacht from capturing Prokhorovka and breaking through the third defensive belt, the last heavily fortified one. Having failed to achieve his objective, Hitler, despite the advice of his commanders, cancelled Operation Citadel and began redeploying his forces to deal with new pressing developments elsewhere.

The Red Army went on a general offensive by conducting Operation Polkovodets Rumyantsev on the southern side and continuing Operation Kutuzov on the northern side. The Soviet Union thus seized the strategic initiative on the Eastern Front, which it held for the rest of the war.

== Background ==
Map showing the German plan for Operation Citadel (blue arrows) to cut off the Kursk salient into a pocket, and the deployment of Soviet and German forces ahead of the operation. The blobs of red dashed lines show the position of Soviet reserves upon their arrival. The map shows the starting position of the II SS-Panzer Corps, the initial redeployment positions of the 5th Guards Tank Army ("5. GpzA") and the 5th Guards Army ("5. GA"). Prokhorovka (not shown) is 40 kilometres (25 mi) northeast of Pokrovka ("Pokrowka").

After the conclusion of the battle for the Donets, as the spring rasputitsa (mud) season came to an end in 1943, both the German and Soviet commands considered their plans for future operations. The Soviet premier Joseph Stalin and some senior Soviet officers wanted to seize the initiative first and attack the German forces inside the Soviet Union, but they were convinced by a number of key commanders, including the Deputy Supreme Commander Georgy Zhukov, to assume a defensive posture instead. This would allow the German side to weaken themselves in attacking prepared positions, after which the Soviet forces would be able to respond with a counteroffensive.

Strategic discussions also occurred on the German side, with Field Marshal Erich von Manstein arguing for a mobile defence that would give up terrain and allow the Soviet units to advance, while the German forces launched a series of sharp counterattacks against their flanks to inflict heavy attrition. But for political reasons, German Fuhrer Adolf Hitler insisted that the German forces go on the offensive, choosing the Kursk salient for the attack. On 15 April 1943 he authorised preparations for Unternehmen Zitadelle (Operation Citadel).

The German offensive plan envisioned an assault at the base of the Kursk salient from both the north and south, with the intent of enveloping and destroying the Soviet forces in the salient. The two spearheads were to meet near the city of Kursk. From the south, the XXXXVIII Panzer Corps and General Paul Hausser's II SS-Panzer Corps, forming the left and right wings of the 4th Panzer Army commanded by Colonel General Hermann Hoth, would drive northward. The III Panzer Corps of Army Detachment Kempf was to protect Hoth's right flank. The 4th Panzer Army and Army Detachment Kempf were under Army Group South, commanded by von Manstein. Air support over the southern portion of the offensive was provided by Colonel General Otto Deßloch's Luftflotte 4 and its major air formation, the 8th Air Corps. The German offensive, originally slated to commence in the beginning of May, was postponed several times as the German leadership reconsidered and vacillated over its prospects, as well as to bring forward more units and equipment.

The Soviet leadership, through their intelligence agencies and foreign sources, learned about the German intentions, and therefore the multiple delays by the German army high command, the Oberkommando des Heeres (OKH), allowed them a great deal of time to prepare their defences. Employing defence in depth, they constructed a series of defensive lines to wear down the attacking panzer formations. Three belts made up of extensive minefields, anti-tank ditches, and anti-tank gun emplacements were created; behind those were an additional three belts, which were mostly unoccupied and less fortified. The Voronezh Front, commanded by General Nikolai Vatutin, defended the southern face of the salient. The Steppe Front, commanded by Colonel General Ivan Konev, formed the strategic reserve. It was to be held back east of the salient until the time was right for the Soviet counteroffensive. This formation included Lieutenant General Aleksey Zhadov's 5th Guards Army and Lieutenant General Pavel Rotmistrov's 5th Guards Tank Army.

=== German advance leading up to Prokhorovka ===
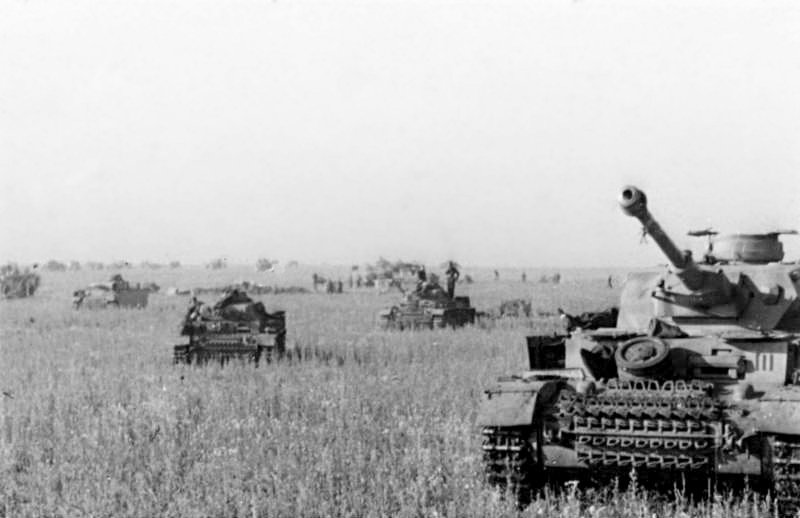
Panzer IIIs and IVs on the southern side of the Kursk salient at the start of Operation Citadel

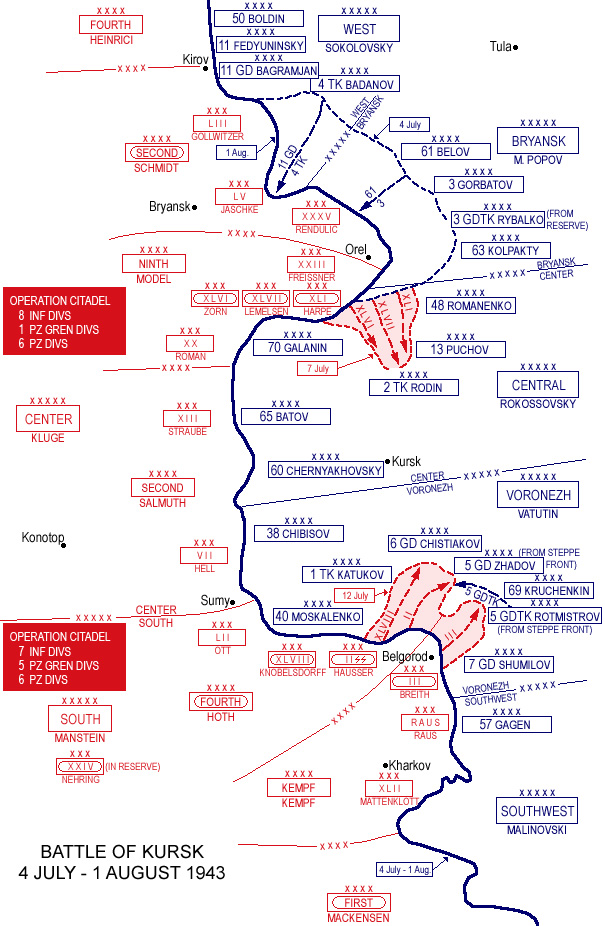
The extent of the German advance during Operation Citadel (red dashed line arrows)

The Heer launched its attack on the morning of 5 July 1943 and met heavy resistance. There were far more Soviet anti-tank guns, minefields, anti-tank ditches and overall Soviet resistance than had been anticipated, making a breakthrough more difficult to achieve. Furthermore, from the outset they were subjected to frequent counterattacks from Soviet tank units. Despite this, by the end of 5 July the II SS-Panzer Corps had advanced through the first defensive belt on the southern side of the salient and reached the second, although the plan was to breach the first two belts and reach the third on the first day. Nonetheless, the panzer corps' penetration caused great concern among Soviet commanders, compelling Vatutin to commit almost all of the Voronezh Front's operational reserves by the end of the first day.

The III Panzer Corps met with stiff resistance as well and had great difficulty creating and maintaining a bridgehead across the Northern Donets River. They eventually succeeded by the morning of 6 July, but the delay in their advance kept them from protecting the east flank of the II SS-Panzer Corps.

Late on 6 July, the 5th Guards Tank and 5th Guards Armies of the Steppe Front began moving up from their reserve position. The 5th Guards Tank Army covered the 320–390 kilometres (200–240 mi) over three days, and arrived at the Prokhorovka area on the night of 9 July, and the 5th Guards Army's 33rd Guards Rifle Corps arrived at the settlement on the night of 10 July. Both armies completed their journey and deployment intact without any substantial interference from the Luftwaffe.

Slow progress by the XXXXVIII Panzer Corps caused Hoth to shift elements of the II SS-Panzer Corps on 8 July to aid the XXXXVIII Corps' drive towards Oboyan and Kursk. On the same day, the Soviet units counterattacked the II SS-Panzer Corps with several tank corps. These attacks did not destroy the panzer corps as hoped, but slowed its progress. By the end of 8 July, the II SS-Panzer Corps had advanced about 29 km (18 miles) and broken through the first and second defensive belts.

On the following day, 9 July, a meeting of the commanders of the German forces on the northern side of the Kursk salient concluded that a breakthrough on the northern side of the salient was unlikely. Nevertheless, they decided to continue their offensive to maintain pressure and inflict casualties, thereby tying down the Soviet forces there. Any level of success for Operation Citadel now depended on a breakthrough being achieved by the 4th Panzer Army and Army Detachment Kempf on the southern side of the Kursk salient.

=== German attack towards Prokhorovka ===
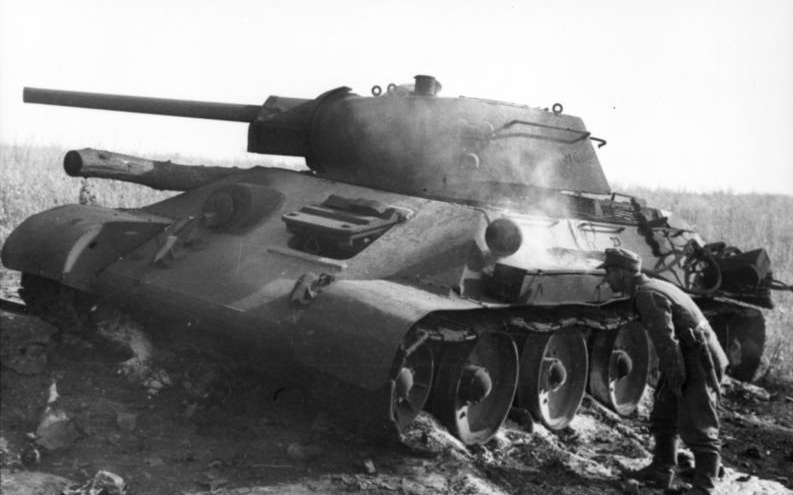
A German soldier inspects a T-34 tank knocked out at Pokrovka that is still smoldering. Pokrovka is 40 kilometres (25 mi) southwest of Prokhorovka.

On the evening of 9 July, the II SS-Panzer Corps was ordered to shift its own forward progress, from due north to the northeast, towards the settlement of Prokhorovka. Hoth had formulated this move, and had discussed it with Manstein since early May, as he expected large Soviet armoured reserve forces to arrive from the east, and he did not want his corps to be caught crossing the Psel River when they arrived. The plan originally envisioned elements of the XXXXVIII Panzer Corps and III Panzer Corps joining in the attack towards Prokhorovka, but this could not be realised. The Soviet command, however, interpreted the change in direction to be a response to the heavy resistance the German forces had faced driving towards Oboyan, and incorrectly believed the change indicated the German panzer forces had been severely weakened.

Soviet intelligence reports issued from 8 to 9 July reported that defensive works were being constructed by German infantry on the flanks of the 4th Panzer Army, and that German armoured formations were not present in these locations, despite the fact that Soviet armoured formations were situated opposite these flanks. Voronezh Front headquarters supposed the Germans must be reaching their limit, and on 10 July decided to set its counterattack to coincide with the planned Soviet counteroffensive on the northern side of the Kursk salient, Operation Kutuzov, which was set for 12 July.

Starting on the morning of 10 July, the II SS-Panzer Corps began its attack towards Prokhorovka. Its 3rd SS-Panzergrenadier Division Totenkopf attacked across the Psel River and secured a bridgehead. The 1st SS-Panzergrenadier Division Leibstandarte SS Adolf Hitler captured Komsomolets State Farm and Hill 241.6. The 2nd SS-Panzergrenadier Division Das Reich defended the panzer corps' flank from Soviet armoured counterattacks.

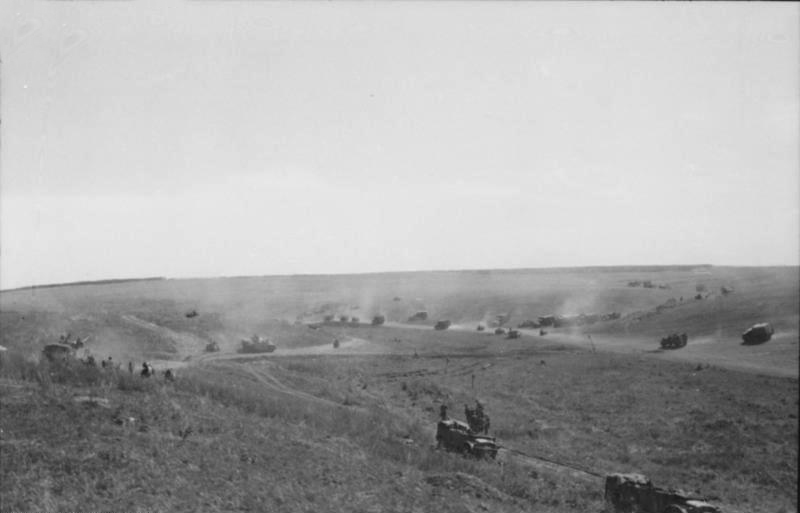
Vehicles of II SS-Panzer Corps advancing towards Prokhorovka on 11 July

The II SS-Panzer Corps continued its attack towards Prokhorovka on 11 July. The advance of Leibstandarte was checked by the 2nd Tank Corps, which had been reinforced by the 9th Guards Airborne Division and 301st Anti-Tank Artillery Regiment, both from the 33rd Guards Rifle Corps. Totenkopf was resisted by the 31st Tank Corps, the 33rd Guards Rifle Corps' 95th Guards Rifle Division, and the 11th Motorised Rifle Brigade of the 10th Tank Corps. To the south of Leibstandarte, the 2nd Guards Tank Corps and the 48th Rifle Corps' 183rd Rifle Division opposed the advance of Das Reich.

By day's end on 11 July Leibstandarte had advanced deep into the Soviet third defensive belt. They had moved up the Psel corridor, cleared Soviet resistance at the Oktyabrsky ("October") State Farm (Russian: Совхоз Октябрьский), crossed a 15-foot (4.6 m)-deep anti-tank ditch at the base of Hill 252.2 and seized the hill itself after a brief but bloody battle, leaving them only 3 kilometres (1.9 mi) south of Prokhorovka. To its northwest, the panzergrenadiers of Totenkopf had achieved a bridgehead across the Psel and tanks had been brought across, but they had yet to take Hill 226.6 and there was a 5-kilometre (3.1 mi) gap between Totenkopf and Leibstandarte. To the south of Leibstandarte, Das Reich had also met stiff resistance and lagged behind some 4 kilometres (2.5 mi). With its advance, Leibstandarte‍ was exposed on both of its flanks.

Late on 11 July the 5th Guards Tank Army prepared for its forthcoming counterattack. Leibstandarte's advance had disrupted Rotmistrov's preparations, as the assembly areas he intended to use for the tank army's 18th and 29th Tank Corps were in German hands by the end of the day, forcing him to hastily revise his plans and select new positions. The arrival of the 5th Guards Tank Army just days earlier was detrimental to it in two major ways: the tank unit commanders did not have an opportunity to reconnoitre the terrain they would be travelling across, and the supporting artillery was unable to site and spot their fire.

== Planning ==
=== German plans for 12 July ===
Late on the evening of 11 July, Hausser, the commander of the II SS-Panzer Corps, issued orders for the next day's advance on Prokhorovka. It was known that the Red Army had dug in many anti-tank guns on the southwest slopes of Prokhorovka, making a direct attack by Leibstandarte very difficult. The plan was for Totenkopf to capture Hill 226.6, and advance northeast along the Psel River to the Kartashyovka–Prokhorovka road, and then strike southeast into the flank and rear of Soviet forces at Prokhorovka. Leibstandarte was ordered to make a limited advance and secure Storozhevoe and Lamki just outside Prokhorovka, then it and Das Reich were to wait until Totenkopf's attack had disrupted the Soviet positions, after which Leibstandarte was to attack the main Soviet defences on the southwest slope of Prokhorovka. To Leibstandarte's right, elements of Das Reich were also to advance eastward to the high ground south of Prokhorovka, then turn south away from Prokhorovka to roll up the Soviet defences opposing the III Panzer Corps' advance and force a gap. The 8th Air Corps was to concentrate its effort to supporting the advance of the II SS-Panzer Corps, with the XXXXVIII Panzer Corps to the west assigned limited air resources.

Pavel Rotmistrov, commanding officer of the 5th Guards Tank Army

=== Soviet plans for 12 July ===
The 5th Guards Army and 5th Guards Tank Army of the Steppe Front had been brought up from reserve and reassigned to the Voronezh Front on 8 and 11 July respectively. On 11 July, Vatutin ordered the armies of the Voronezh Front to go over to the offensive on the following day. This Soviet counterattack on the southern side of the Kursk salient was planned to coincide with the offensive against Oryol on the northern side, Operation Kutuzov. Vatutin ordered Rotmistrov to destroy the German forces near Prokhorovka with his 5th Guards Tank Army, without allowing the German forces to withdraw southward.

For the battle, Rotmistrov ordered his tanks to move forward at high speed to engage the German armour in order to nullify the advantages the Tiger tanks had in the range and firepower of their 88 mm guns. He believed the more manoeuvrable T-34 medium tanks would be able to quickly close in and obtain effective flanking shots against the German heavy tanks. In fact, Soviet intelligence had greatly overestimated the numbers of Ferdinand Jagdpanzer tank destroyers and Tiger tanks possessed by the II SS-Panzer Corps. In actuality there were no Ferdinands with the 4th Panzer Army or Army Group South, as they were all deployed on the northern side of the Kursk salient with the 9th Army. Soviet tank crews frequently mistook the versions of Panzer IV tanks that were armed with the 7.5 cm KwK 40 anti-tank gun, which also had extra armour added to their turret, for Tigers; therefore Soviet reports tended to overestimate the number of Tigers employed by the German side during the Battle of Kursk.

Soviet air support in the southern part of the salient was provided by the 2nd Air Army and the 17th Air Army, commanded by Lieutenant General Stepan Krasovsky and Lieutenant General Vladimir Sudets, respectively. However, the bulk of the air support was committed in support of Soviet units attacking the XXXXVIII Panzer Corps to the west of Prokhorovka and the III Panzer Corps to the southeast, and only limited numbers of aircraft were available to support 5th Guards Tank Army's attack.

Rotmistrov's plans for a counterattack were threatened by events to the south. The III Panzer Corps managed to cross the Northern Donets at Rzhavets on the night of 11 July, and was about 18 kilometres (11 mi) southeast of Prokhorovka, and advancing northwards. This threat jeopardised Rotmistrov's entire plan by threatening the flank and rear of the 5th Guards Tank Army. Early on 12 July, Vatutin ordered Rotmistrov to send reinforcements to the Soviet 7th Guards and 69th Armies facing the III Panzer Corps. He organised a task force under the command of his deputy, Major General Kuzma Trufanov, which consisted of the 26th Guards Tank Brigade from the 2nd Guards Tank Corps, the 11th and 12th Guards Mechanised Brigades from the 5th Guards Mechanised Corps, and the 53rd Guards Tank Regiment of the 5th Guards Tank Army. Other units of the Voronezh Front also joined the group on its way south. In doing so, Rotmistrov committed over half of his army's reserves before the Battle of Prokhorovka had begun.

== Opposing forces ==
=== Disposition of German forces ===
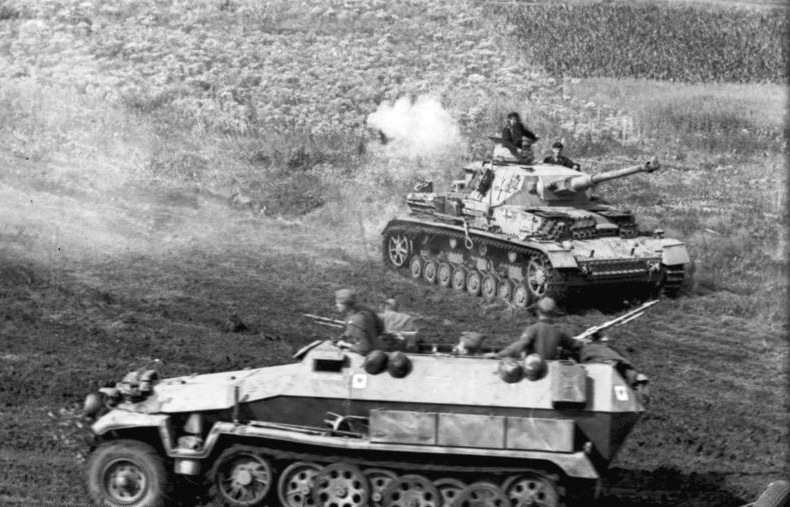
A German Panzer IV and Sd.Kfz. 251 halftrack on the Eastern Front, July 1943

The German forces involved in the Battle of Prokhorovka were from the three Waffen-SS divisions of the II SS-Panzer Corps: Leibstandarte, Das Reich, and Totenkopf. On the evening of 11 July, the serviceable armour strength of the II SS-Panzer Corps was 294 tanks and assault guns, which included 15 Tigers. The armoured strength of Leibstandarte, Das Reich, and Totenkopf were 77, 95, and 122 tanks and assault guns respectively. Ten of the Tigers were to the north of the Psel River with Totenkopf, four were with Leibstandarte, and Das Reich had just one.

Leibstandarte had advanced the most deeply towards Prokhorovka and was situated in the centre of the German position. A railway line, with a 30-feet high railbed, divided Leibstandarte's area into north and south. The bulk of the division was positioned to the north of the rail line, including the division's 1st SS-Panzer Regiment and 2nd SS-Panzergrenadier Regiment, as well as its reconnaissance, artillery and command units. To the south of the rail line was Leibstandarte's 1st SS-Panzergrenadier Regiment, along with the division's 1st SS-Panzerjäger Battalion.

Das Reich was positioned to the south of Leibstandarte, and it protected the southern flank of the II SS-Panzer Corps. Totenkopf was positioned to the northwest of Leibstandarte. Totenkopf's 3rd SS-Panzer Regiment had largely crossed over the Psel in preparation for the assault. Leibstandarte placed its lightly armed 1st SS-Panzer Reconnaissance Battalion in the 5-kilometre (3.1 mi) gap between it and Totenkopf to provide some flank protection. The unit was, later on 12 July, buttressed by the division's four remaining Tigers, commanded by SS-Untersturmführer Michael Wittmann.

=== Disposition of Soviet forces ===
The main Soviet armoured formation involved in the battle was the 5th Guards Tank Army, which controlled five corps, two of which were Guards units, by 12 July: the 2nd Guards, 2nd, 5th Guards Mechanised, 18th and 29th Tank Corps. Altogether they fielded 793 tanks and 37 to 57 self-propelled guns for a total of approximately 840 armoured fighting vehicles. About two-thirds of these tanks were T-34s, while the remainder were T-70 light tanks, with some 31 to 35 Churchill heavy tanks as well.

Not all of the 5th Guards Tank Army was present in the Prokhorovka area during the battle, as part of the formation had been sent south to check the advance of the III Panzer Corps. The Soviet armour of the 5th Guards Tank Army – including the newly attached 2nd Guards Tank Corps and 2nd Tank Corps, as well as the 5th Guards Mechanised Corps held in reserve – that faced the II SS-Panzer Corps on 12 July was about 616 tanks and self-propelled guns. In addition, five artillery regiments, one artillery brigade, and one anti-aircraft artillery division were attached to the 5th Guards Tank Army for the assault.

The main attack of the 5th Guards Tank Army was conducted against Leibstandarte by its fresh 29th and 18th Tank Corps that had been brought up from the Soviet strategic reserve. These two Soviet tank corps together provided the greatest number of tanks in the attack, with the 18th Tank Corps fielding 190 tanks and self-propelled guns, and the 29th Tank Corps fielding 212 tanks and self-propelled guns. Infantry support to the 18th and 29th Tank Corps was provided by the 9th Guards Airborne Division.

A portion of the 18th Tank Corps was directed against the eastern flank of Totenkopf's 6th SS-Panzergrenadier Regiment Theodor Eicke. On the southeastern wing of the 5th Guards Tank Army, Rotmistrov deployed the 120 tanks of the 2nd Guards Tank Corps. Later on 12 July during the battle, the 26th Guards Tank Brigade of that tank corps with its estimated 40 tanks were sent south to face the III Panzer Corps.

The remainder of the 2nd Guards Tank Corps, supported by the remnants of the 2nd Tank Corps, was to attack Das Reich. Their infantry support was provided by the 183rd Rifle Division. The western flank of the 5th Guards Tank Army, which faced Totenkopf, was defended by the 33rd Guards Rifle Corps' 42nd and 95th Guards Rifle Divisions, which were supported by the remnants of the 31st Tank Corps and the heavily depleted 23rd Guards Rifle Corps' 52nd Guards Rifle Division. The forces of the 5th Guards Mechanised Corps that were not sent south were held as reserve northwest of Prokhorovka, and they numbered about 113 tanks and self-propelled guns.

Vatutin directed Soviet air assets to commit their main effort towards checking the III Panzer Corps' drive northward, and in supporting the attack against the XXXXVIII Panzer Corps. Missions were flown in support of the attack of the 5th Guards Tank Army as well, but to a limited extent. The 2nd Air Army had some 472 aircraft operational on 12 July, while the 17th Air Army had 300 operational aircraft.

== Battle ==
At 05:45 on 12 July, Leibstandarte's headquarters started receiving reports of the sound of many tank engines as the Soviet tanks moved into their assembly areas for the attack. At around 06:50, elements of Leibstandarte's 1st SS-Panzergrenadier Regiment nudged forward and drove the Soviet infantry out of Storozhevoe, while elements of the division's 2nd SS-Panzergrenadier Regiment fanned out from the Oktyabrsky State Farm. The Soviet forces began a preparatory artillery barrage at around 08:00, and as the last shells fell at 08:30, Rotmistrov radioed the code words "Stal! Stal! Stal!" ("Steel, Steel, Steel!") – the order to commence the attack. With that the Soviet armour of the 5th Guards Tank Army began their advance.

=== Ground engagement ===
In total, about 500 tanks and self-propelled guns of the 5th Guards Tank Army attacked the positions of the II SS-Panzer Corps on 12 July, doing so in two waves, with 430 tanks in the first echelon and 70 more in the second.

Down from the slopes in front of Prokhorovka, the massed Soviet armour charged with five tank brigades of the 18th and 29th Tank Corps, firing as they came at Leibstandarte's positions. As the Soviet tanks rolled down the slopes, they carried the men of the 9th Guards Airborne Division on their hulls ("tank desant"). The troops of Leibstandarte were not slated to go into action until later in the day. Exhausted from the previous week's fighting, many were just starting their day at the outset of the attack. As the Soviet armour appeared, German outposts all across the corps' frontage began firing purple warning flares signalling a tank attack. Obersturmbannführer Rudolf von Ribbentrop, commander of a panzer company under the 1st SS-Panzer Regiment, stated that he knew at once a major attack was underway. He ordered his company of seven Panzer IVs to follow him over a bridge across an anti-tank ditch. Crossing the bridge they fanned out on the lower slope of Hill 252.2. On the crest of the hill, Sturmbannführer Joachim Peiper's 3rd Panzergrenadier Battalion of the 2nd SS-Panzergrenadier Regiment were being overrun.

As Ribbentrop's tanks spread out, he and the 1st SS-Panzer Regiment were suddenly confronted by Soviet tanks of the 29th Tank Corps' 31st and 32nd Tank Brigades: "About 150–200 meters in front of me appeared fifteen, then thirty, then forty tanks. Finally there were too many of them to count." The Soviet armour, firing on the move, charged down the western slopes of Hill 252.2 into the panzer company, and a tank battle ensued. Rotmistrov's tactic to close at high speed disrupted the control and co-ordination of the Soviet tank formations and also greatly reduced their accuracy. In a three-hour battle, the 1st SS-Panzer Regiment engaged the attacking Soviet tanks and repulsed them, reporting that they destroyed about 62 Soviet tanks. Later that afternoon, tanks from the 31st Tank Brigade and the 53rd Motorised Brigade overran elements of the 1st SS-Panzer Reconnaissance Battalion and reached Komsomolets State Farm, threatening Leibstandarte's lines of communication and the division's command post located at Hill 241.6. The Soviet tanks attacked the division's 1st SS-Panzer Artillery Regiment, killing some of the crews before they themselves were destroyed by direct fire from anti-tank teams.

Wittmann's group of four Tigers provided support to the reconnaissance battalion in its effort to protect Leibstandarte's left flank, and faced off with the 18th Tank Corps' advancing 181st Tank Brigade. In a three-hour battle the Tigers engaged the Soviet tanks at ranges from 1,000 metres down to point-blank, inflicting heavy losses on the Soviet tankers and repelling their attack. None of the Tigers were lost. Elements of the 170th Tank Brigade later engaged the 1st SS-Panzer Regiment, which was already fighting the 31st and 32nd Tank Brigades. Despite losing its commander and about 30 tanks in the fight, by early afternoon the 170th Tank Brigade had forced the 1st SS-Panzer Regiment back to the Oktyabrsky State Farm and reached the position of the 1st SS-Panzer Reconnaissance Battalion. At around 18:00, the 170th and 181st Tank Brigades penetrated the German line connecting Totenkopf and Leibstandarte. Assault guns and panzers supporting Totenkopf's 6th SS-Panzergrenadier Regiment Theodor Eicke repelled the Soviet attack and re-established the line, forcing the Soviet tanks to withdraw to the village of Andreyevka.

The advance of Soviet armour down Hill 252.2 was disrupted when they reached the anti-tank ditch at the base of the hill. A number of tanks crashed into the 15-foot deep ditch while others moved along the edge looking for a way to cross. Heavy fire was exchanged between the Soviet tanks and two companies of a panzergrenadier battalion on the opposite side of the ditch. Peiper's surviving panzergrenadiers engaged the Soviet infantry and attacked the Soviet tanks with Hafthohlladung magnetic anti-tank grenades. Twenty of his battalion's half-tracks were lost in the fighting, some destroyed in ramming the much heavier Soviet tanks in an effort to stop them. Eventually, due to heavy Soviet pressure and dangerously exposed flanks, Leibstandarte withdrew from the Oktyabrsky State Farm and established firmer defensive lines 1 kilometre (0.62 mi) to the south.

=== Air combat ===
The 2nd and 17th Air Armies flew 893 sorties compared to the German 8th Air Corps's 654 sorties over the southern part of the salient. Of note, most of the Soviet sorties flown that day were flown against the XXXXVIII Panzer Corps to the west and the III Panzer Corps to the south. Low clouds in the morning and thunderstorms in the afternoon inhibited air operations over Prokhorovka for both sides.

The Luftwaffe gained control of the air over the Prokhorovka battlefield. Formations of Junkers Ju 87 Stukas, including a small number of the G-2 variants, experimentally equipped with twin 3.7 cm (1.5 in) Bordkanone BK 3,7 cannon in gun pods, that were commanded by Staffelkapitän Hans-Ulrich Rudel, attacked the Soviet formations. They were joined by Focke-Wulf Fw 190 single engine fighter-bombers and Henschel Hs 129 twin-engined ground-attack aircraft, both equipped with 30 mm (1.2 in) anti-tank cannon.

In particular, the Hs 129 formations from SG 1 inflicted grievous losses on Soviet tanks. The Stuka wings, StG 2 and StG 77, made their weakest contribution to the Kursk operation since the 5 July – 150 sorties – down from 1,071 on 5 July, but the small Ju 87G contingent proved effective. Luftwaffe liaison officers allotted to German ground forces were able to guide the close air support units to carry out pinpoint attacks. SG 1 and Panzerjägerstaffel/JG 51 flew 248 attack missions, virtually all of them in support of the II SS-Panzer Corps.

The 31st Tank Brigade, 29th Tank Corps, reported: "We suffered heavy losses in tanks through enemy artillery and aircraft. At 10:30 our tanks reached the Komsomolets State Farm, but due to continuous air attacks, they were unable to advance any further and shifted to the defence." The tank brigade also reported: "our own air cover was fully absent until 13:00." The 5th Guards Tank Army reported: "the enemy's aircraft literally hung above our combat formations throughout the entire battle, while our own aircraft, and particularly the fighter aviation, was totally insufficient." The 36th Tank Brigade lost its commander to an air attack.

The Germans dominated the Prokhorovka air space for several reasons. During the initial stages of the battle it was Soviet tanks that were hit and burned, obscuring the battlefield which made it difficult for Soviet commanders to develop a clear picture of the situation. Added to that was the failure to provide air liaison officers with Red Army forces, who were then unable to call for air support when the German assault formations first appeared. Whereas the German 8th Air Corps assembled powerful concentrations over the Prokhorovka battlefield, the 17th Air Army spread its forces thinly, to support other sectors; the Soviets dominated the air over the 4th Panzer Army's flanks, leaving the skies over Prokhorovka clear. The 2nd Air Army's fighter aviation had been reduced to 266 aircraft, and this force was used in the fighter escort, not the air superiority role. The battle of Prokhorovka absorbed the 8th Air Corps' combat power to the extent it was unable to intervene to support the XXXXVIII Panzer Corps, enabling Soviet defences to defeat the attempted breakthrough in that sector.

The posture, dispositions and tactics on 12 July led to few losses on either side in air combat. The 8th Air Corps reported 19 aircraft damaged and destroyed. Only one German aircraft was reported lost in combat with Soviet fighters; the rest were victims of Soviet ground-fire. In return, the 2nd Air Army reported 14 fighters damaged and destroyed. German fighter pilots claimed only seven, though they claimed 16 aircraft of all types shot down. Soviet bomber losses are unknown.

=== Result of the engagement ===
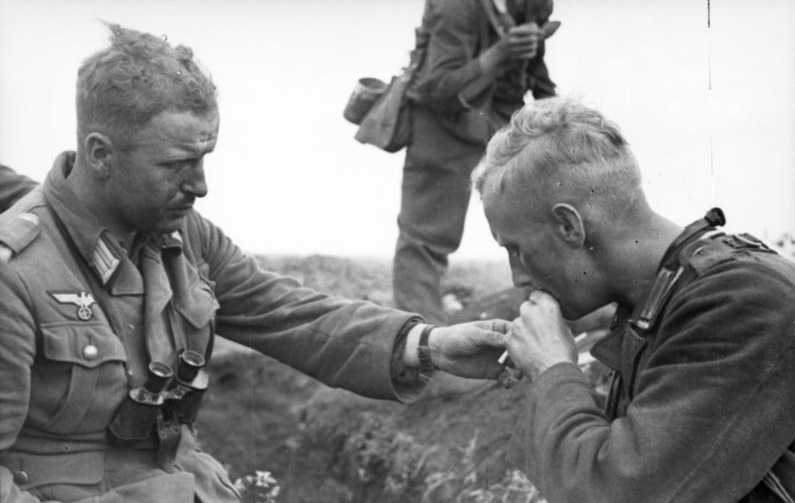
German troops during a lull in the fighting during Operation Citadel on the southern side of the Kursk salient

By the end of the day, Leibstandarte still held Hill 252.2, but had been exhausted by the effort of turning back five Soviet tank brigades. To its left, Totenkopf had captured Hill 226.6 and advanced along the northern bank of the Psel River to reach the Kartashyovka–Prokhorovka road, 8 kilometres (5.0 mi) northwest of Prokhorovka in accordance with plan. It was in position to outflank the Soviet forces at Prokhorovka, but was under pressure from Soviet attacks and its hold on the forward ground was tenuous. Forced onto the defensive by the attacks of the 2nd Guards and 2nd Tank Corps, Das Reich was unable to conduct its planned offensive manoeuvres.

On the Soviet side, all the tank units under Rotmistrov's 5th Guards Tank Army involved in the battle on 12 July suffered heavy losses. Rotmistrov later wrote that the 29th Tank Corps lost 60 per cent of its armour and the 18th Tank Corps lost 30 per cent on 12 July. A Soviet General Staff report recorded: "Thus on 12 July, the 5th Guards Tank Army failed to accomplish its assigned mission. As a result of the frontal attack, the army's corps fought heavy battles against large enemy tank forces during which they were forced to assume defence."

Rotmistrov was forced to shift the 18th and 29th Tank Corps over to defence and reinforce them with infantry. They dug more trenches, dug in some of their tanks, laid new minefields, prepared anti-tank strong points and massed their artillery. The 10th Guards Mechanised and 24th Guards Tank Brigades of the 5th Guards Mechanised Corps made preparations to push Totenkopf back the next morning.

Stalin was very disappointed and infuriated by the early reports of heavy Soviet losses in the battle and on the evening of 12 July, he berated Rotmistrov via a phone call. The same evening, he dispatched Zhukov, who had been overseeing Operation Kutuzov, to Vatutin's headquarters as Stavka representative, in order to assume control of coordinating the operations of the Voronezh and Steppe Fronts. A commission was dispatched to investigate the cause of the high losses and the role of Rotmistrov and his plans in the battle; its findings were completed and submitted to Stalin two weeks later, and initially considering sacking Rotmistrov and hauling him before a military tribunal, Stalin eventually changed his mind after the Chief of the General Staff Aleksandr Vasilevsky interceded.

== Following the main engagement ==
On the night of 12 July, Vatutin ordered Soviet forces to prevent any further German advance on Prokhorovka, destroy German forces that had advanced along the northern bank of the Psel River, and stop the III Panzer Corps from making further progress. Orders issued by the German command for 13 July instructed Totenkopf to consolidate its gains of the previous day and then attack into the flank and rear of the Soviet forces around Prokhorovka. Leibstandarte was to strengthen its front line and co-ordinate its attack on Prokhorovka from the south with Totenkopf's attack from the northwest. Das Reich was to consolidate and strengthen its front line and prepare for an offensive operation to link up with the III Panzer Corps.

=== Further fighting around Prokhorovka ===
On the morning of 13 July, the 10th Guards Mechanised and 24th Guards Tank Brigades, in cooperation with the 95th and 52nd Guards Rifle Corps, launched attacks against Totenkopf. These Soviet attacks preoccupied Totenkopf and prevented it from attacking towards Prokhorovka. Around noon, Leibstandarte's 1st SS-Panzer Reconnaissance Battalion was ordered to attack northward towards the Psel River to consolidate its front line with Totenkopf, while the division's panzer units were to attack towards Soviet positions northeast of the Oktyabrsky State Farm towards Prokhorovka.

The 1st SS-Panzer Reconnaissance Battalion attacked the defensive positions held by the 42nd Guards Rifle Division and the remaining armour of the 18th Tank Corps, while the panzer units attacked the defences of the 9th Guards Airborne Division and 29th Tank Corps. These German attacks were repelled by concentrated anti-tank artillery fire. The 29th Tank Corps responded with a counterattack and penetrated German lines, reaching Komsomolets State Farm before being beaten back by direct fire from German artillery. That afternoon, Totenkopf was ordered to abandon their positions northwest of Prokhorovka and return to tenable positions around Hill 226.6. Soviet attempts to sever the narrow salient were unsuccessful, and Totenkopf completed its withdrawal by nightfall.

=== Termination of Operation Citadel ===
On 13 July Hitler summoned Manstein and the commander of Army Group Centre, Field Marshal Günther von Kluge, to his Eastern Front headquarters, the Wolf's Lair in East Prussia. The Allied invasion of Sicily on the night of 9–10 July, combined with the Soviet counteroffensive of Operation Kutuzov against the flank and rear of General Walter Model's 9th Army on the northern side of the Kursk salient on 12 July, and the attacks by strong Soviet forces at Prokhorovka the same day had caused Hitler to stop the offensive and begin redeploying forces to the Mediterranean theatre. He ordered his generals to terminate Operation Citadel.

Kluge welcomed the decision, as he was already in the process of withdrawing units of the 9th Army from the northern side of the Kursk salient to deal with Soviet attacks on his flank. But Manstein was greatly disappointed. He argued that his forces were now on the verge of achieving a major breakthrough on the southern side of the salient. As he saw it, with his III Panzer Corps about to link up with the II SS-Panzer Corps at Prokhorovka, and with the XXIV Panzer Corps available as his operational reserve, they would be halting the offensive just at the moment when victory was in hand. With an eye towards the west, Hitler was unwilling to continue the offensive. Manstein persisted, proposing that his forces should at least destroy the Soviet reserves in the southern Kursk salient before Citadel was finally terminated, so that the Soviet fighting capacity in the sector would be depleted for the rest of the summer. Hitler agreed to continue offensive operations in the southern salient until Manstein's goal was achieved.

=== Operation Roland ===
After the meeting with Hitler on 13 July, Manstein hastily put together the plans for Operation Roland, realising that he only had a few days to conduct the operation before he lost the II SS-Panzer Corps due to redeployment. The plan called for Das Reich to attack east and south and link up with the III Panzer Corps, which would attack to the northwest. Totenkopf and Leibstandarte were to anchor the western and northern flanks of Das Reich, respectively. Once the link was achieved and the Soviet forces encircled, Prokhorovka would then be attacked shortly thereafter by the combined forces of the II SS-Panzer Corps and III Panzer Corps. The goal of the operation was to destroy the Soviet armoured reserves massed in the southern sector of the Kursk salient, and thereby check Soviet offensive capacity for the rest of the summer.

The orders for Operation Roland were issued in the closing hours of 13 July 1943. But after meeting with Manstein, Hitler countermanded the XXIV Panzer Corps' deployment to the Kursk salient, sending them on 14 July to support the 1st Panzer Army to the south. The assault began at 04:00 on 14 July. Following a brief artillery barrage, the 4th SS-Panzergrenadier Regiment Der Führer of Das Reich struck out for the high ground south-west of Pravorot, evicting the remnants of the 2nd Guards Tank Corps from the village of Belenikhino following house-to-house and hand-to-hand fighting. Das Reich's 2nd SS-Panzer Regiment fought off a series of counterattacks and forced the Red Army units to withdraw eastward to a new line.

Zhukov ordered the 10th Guards Mechanised Brigade of the 5th Guards Mechanised Corps to reinforce the line. The 7th Panzer Division of the III Panzer Corps made contact with Das Reich, but Trufanov, commanding the Soviet forces in the gap, was aware of the threat and conducted a fighting withdrawal. The link-up failed to trap the Soviet forces, though they abandoned a substantial number of their anti-tank guns. Operation Roland failed to produce a decisive result for the German side, and Totenkopf began withdrawing from its positions north of the Psel, following orders issued late on 15 July, as the II SS-Panzer Corps assumed a defensive stance along its entire front.

On 17 July the Soviet Southwestern and Southern Fronts launched a major offensive across the Mius and Donets Rivers against the southern wing of Army Group South, pressing upon the 6th Army and 1st Panzer Army. In the early afternoon of 17 July, Operation Roland was terminated with an order for the II SS-Panzer Corps to begin withdrawing from the Prokhorovka sector back to Belgorod. The 4th Panzer Army and Army Detachment Kempf anticipated the order and began executing it as early as the evening of 16 July. Leibstandarte's tanks were distributed between Das Reich and Totenkopf, and the division was hastily redeployed to Italy, while Das Reich and Totenkopf were dispatched south to meet the new Soviet offensives.

== Casualties and losses ==
Losses for 12 July are difficult to establish for either combatant. Tank losses attributed to the German side vary, in part due to the Wehrmacht's methodology for counting and reporting equipment losses. Only equipment that could not be repaired or that had to be abandoned were counted as losses, but damaged equipment that could be recovered and repaired were simply listed as such. Likewise, reliable figures for tank and personnel casualties for the Red Army in the Battle of Prokhorovka are difficult to establish. The Red Army considered any tank damaged badly enough that it could not be repaired by its crew as knocked out, even if damage could be and was repaired by higher level mechanics. This meant that Soviet tanks could be "knocked out" many times, then repaired and returned to battle.

=== German ===
The II SS-Panzer Corps reported 842 soldiers killed, wounded, or missing for 12 July, and 2,672 for 12 to 16 July inclusive. Since the German forces controlled much of the Prokhorovka battlefield until 17 July, they were able to recover most of their disabled armoured vehicles. The II SS-Panzer Corps' logistics report for 12 July did not record any confirmed permanent tank losses. Other German sources show that three tanks of the II SS-Panzer Corps (two Panzer IVs and a Tiger) that were immobilised in the battlefield could not be subsequently recovered and therefore the permanent losses can only be adjusted to a possible maximum of three tanks for 12 July.

A study by the US Army's Center for Strategy and Force Evaluation attributed six permanent tank losses, not counting Panzer I and Panzer II light tanks or German assault guns if any. Archival files of the II SS-Panzer Corps and 4th Panzer Army show that the II SS-Panzer Corps permanently lost 17 tanks and assault guns from 12 to 23 July inclusive, which therefore represents the maximum permanent losses the unit could have incurred for the engagement on 12 July up till the end of Operation Roland.

Archival data of the II SS-Panzer Corps shows that the corps had 294 operable tanks and assault guns on the evening of 11 July, and 251 on the evening of 13 July. Allowing for the possibility that some repaired tanks were returned to service on 13 July, these numbers indicate that at least 43 tanks and assault guns became inoperable during this period, which includes all ten Tigers belonging to Totenkopf and one belonging to Leibstandarte. An estimated total of 60–80 tanks and assault guns of the II SS-Panzer Corps were damaged or destroyed in combat on 12 July. By the end of 16 July, the II SS-Panzer Corps had 292 serviceable tanks and assault guns, almost the same number it had at the beginning of the battle on 12 July. On 12 July, Schlachtgeschwader 1 of the 8th Air Corps reported 11 aircraft damaged, all by Soviet anti-aircraft artillery, of which 6 were total write-offs.

=== Soviet ===
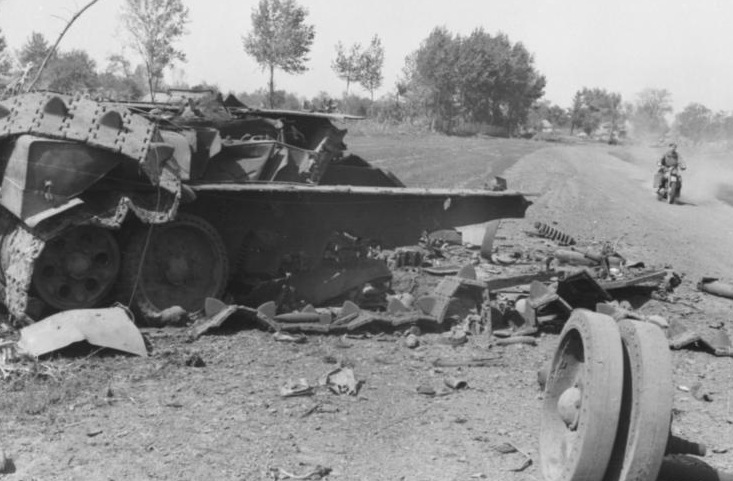
A destroyed Soviet T-34, 1943

A document prepared on 17 July 1943 by the 5th Guards Tank Army headquarters summarised the combat losses incurred by the formation from 12 to 16 July inclusive for all of its five corps, as well as smaller units directly subordinated to the army headquarters. The document reported the following irrecoverable losses: 222 T-34s, 89 T-70s, 12 Churchills, 8 SU-122s, 3 SU-76s, and 240 support vehicles. The document reported damaged vehicles still under repair as 143 T-34s, 56 T-70s, 7 Churchills, 3 SU-122s, and 3 SU-76s, with no figures for support vehicles.

The document reported personnel casualties as 2,940 killed in action, 3,510 wounded in action, and 1,157 missing in action. This totals 334 irrevocable losses in tanks and self-propelled guns, with another 212 tanks and self-propelled guns under repair, and 7,607 casualties. The historian Karl-Heinz Frieser argued that the majority of the losses reported in the document must have occurred on 12 July.

Adding up the 12 July losses of the 5th Guards Tank Army's component units, historian Valery Zamulin found 3,563 personnel losses, of which 1,505 were killed and missing, and 340 tanks and self-propelled guns damaged or destroyed. For equipment damaged or destroyed, David M. Glantz and Jonathan House estimate that the whole 5th Guards Tank Army lost at least 400 tanks in its attacks on 12 July. The Soviet historians Grigoriy Koltunov and Boris Soloviev estimate about 300 tanks and self-propelled guns of the 5th Guards Tank Army were damaged or destroyed on 12 July.

The study by the US Army's Center for Strategy and Force Evaluation reports that the 2nd Guards, 18th and 29th Tanks Corps altogether permanently lost 144 tanks on 12 July, not including self-propelled guns. George Nipe estimates that 600–650 tanks of the 5th Guards Tank Army were damaged or destroyed while fighting both the II SS-Panzer Corps and III Panzer Corps on 12 July.

== Outcome ==
Debate exists over the significance and outcome of the battle. The German forces destroyed many Soviet tanks and temporarily degraded the striking power of the 5th Guards Tank Army, but they were unable to take Prokhorovka or break through into open ground before developments elsewhere forced the termination of Operation Citadel. For the Soviet side, the massive armoured attack of 12 July failed to destroy the II SS-Panzer Corps, but succeeded in exhausting the Germans and eventually contributed to checking their advance. Thus, neither the 5th Guards Tank Army nor the II SS-Panzer Corps accomplished their objectives for 12 July.

While the battle is generally considered a tactical success for the German side due to the high numbers of Soviet tanks destroyed, in the wider perspective the Soviets successfully completed their defensive operation at Prokhorovka and created the conditions for their decisive counteroffensive, Operation Polkovodets Rumyantsev, just as planned. Ultimately there was no German breakthrough at Prokhorovka or elsewhere in the Kursk salient, becoming the first time in the Second World War that a major German offensive was halted before it could break through enemy defences and penetrate into their operational or strategic depths. With the end of Operation Citadel, the strategic initiative permanently swung over to the Soviet Union for the rest of the war.

== Misconceptions and disputes ==
=== Size of the tank battle and German losses ===
The battle has been widely described as the largest tank engagement or battle in military history, involving 1,200–1,500 tanks and sometimes up to 2,000, but this is incorrect as the battle did not involve that many tanks. The exaggerated figures originated from erroneous Soviet intelligence estimates of German armour reported during and after the battle, and subsequent postwar accounts that repeated this erroneous narrative. Some Soviet estimates reported figures as high as 800 German tanks and assault guns attacking Prokhorovka on 12 July.

Comparing Soviet and German archives, the total number of tanks and other heavy armoured fighting vehicles such as assault guns and self-propelled guns deployed by the 5th Guards Tank Army and the II SS-Panzer Corps around Prokhorovka during the battle numbered only about 910. The II SS-Panzer Corps never had the number of tanks and assault guns attributed to it by Soviet estimates at any point during Operation Citadel, not even at the start when it fielded only 494.

Even if the definition of the battle was broadened to include the III Panzer Corps and the portion of the 5th Guards Tank Army that faced it, the total number of tanks and other heavy armoured fighting vehicles comes out at a maximum of 1,299. In contrast, for example, the Battle of Brody during Operation Barbarossa involved over 2,000 tanks, up to 6,000 tanks over the duration of the battle, engaged in combat over a 70-kilometre (43 mi) front. Nonetheless, the Battle of Prokhorovka is still regarded as one of the largest tank battles in military history.

High figures for tanks lost during the battle have been widely attributed to the Germans, but these are incorrect. For example, Rotmistrov in his postwar accounts of the battle stated that the Germans lost 350–400 tanks, including 70 Tigers, and 3,500–10,000 soldiers on 12 July, and a Soviet General Staff study of the Battle of Kursk reported that the Germans lost 300 tanks, 20 assault guns and over 4,500 soldiers in the battle from 12 to 16 July inclusive. However, archival data of the German units involved show that much smaller losses were incurred during the battle.

=== Impetus for the attack at Prokhorovka ===
The historians David M. Glantz and Jonathan House asserted that the original intention of the 4th Panzer Army command was to drive northwards, with its two panzer corps driving abreast towards Oboyan and then Kursk but that on 9 July, heavy Soviet resistance along the road to Oboyan forced Hoth to alter his plan disastrously by ordering the II SS-Panzer Corps to swing from northwest to the northeast towards Prokhorovka. Therefore, according to Glantz and House, the Battle of Prokhorovka was not a result of original intentions or planned for but was engendered by tactically flawed late improvisations to the original German plan.

That narrative has been disputed by the historian Steven Newton, who dedicated a section of his 2002 publication about Operation Citadel to refuting it. Using first-hand accounts of German officers who executed Operation Citadel and scrutinising Glantz's and House's sources, Newton contended that the plan for the 4th Panzer Army to swing from the Oboyan direction to Prokhorovka was decided as early as May 1943, well before Operation Citadel had commenced, as German planners of Army Group South had always expected an encounter between the 4th Panzer Army and Soviet reserves that would arrive at the Psel River and Prokhorovka. Other historians have corroborated those conclusions. Newton also asserts that has always been the accepted narrative in postwar literature.

=== Surprise factor ===
Some historians state that the German troops did not expect the Soviet armoured counterattack and were taken by surprise on 12 July. However, other historians have stated or argued that the German commanders were aware of or at least anticipated the Soviet armour that was massing around Prokhorovka and so the troops could not have been genuinely surprised. The German historian Dieter Brand argues that even though the German commanders expected a major Soviet armoured deployment at Prokhorovka, the frontline German troops were indeed largely taken by surprise when the Soviets counterattacked on the morning of 12 July.
