= Trufanov =

Trufanov (Russian: Труфанов) is a Russian masculine surname, its feminine counterpart is Trufanova. It may refer to

- Nikolai Trufanov (1900-1982), Soviet Colonel General during World War II
- Kuzma Trufanov (1901–1958), Soviet commander during World War II
- Mikhail Trufanov (1921–1988), Russian painter
- Sergei Trufanov (1880–1952), Russian priest
- Viktor Trufanov (born 1952), Russian general, head of the Russian Coast Guard
