= Kuzma Trufanov =

Russian general (1901–1958)

Kuzma Grigorevich Trufanov
- Кузьма Григорьевич Труфанов
- Born: 15 November 1901; Voronezh Governorate, Russian Empire
- Died: 30 December 1958 (aged 57); Krasnodar Krai, Soviet Union
- Military career
- Allegiance: Soviet Union
- Service years: 1918–1944
- Rank: Major General
- Unit: 18th Tank Corps
- Conflicts: World War II; Battle of Kursk; Battle of the Dnieper

Kuzma Grigorevich Trufanov (Russian: Кузьма Григорьевич Труфанов; 15 November 1901 — 30 December 1958) was a Russian Red Army major general during the Second World War.

Trufanov joined the Red Army in 1918, fighting in the Russian Civil War and the Polish–Soviet War. He became a cavalry officer and participated in the Battle of Lake Khasan in 1938. Before the German invasion of the Soviet Union Trufanov became commander of the 7th Mechanized Corps' motorcycle regiment. He was severely wounded in the corps' unsuccessful Lepel counterattack in July 1941 and received the Order of Lenin for his actions. After recovering, Trufanov became commander of a cavalry school. In March 1943 he became deputy commander of the 5th Guards Tank Army. During the Battle of Prokhorovka, part of the Battle of Kursk, Trufanov led the army's reserve in the counterattack at Prokhorovka. In September he was given command of the army's 18th Tank Corps. However, Trufanov did not command for long, as he was severely wounded during the Battle of the Dnieper in October. After a year of treatment in the hospital, Trufanov was discharged from the army in November 1944.
