= 2nd Tank Corps =

Tank corps of the Soviet military

- Active: April 1942 – September 1943
- Country: Soviet Union
- Branch: Red Army
- Type: Armored
- Role: Breakthrough and Exploitation in Deep Operations
- Size: Corps (120–200 tanks)
- Engagements: World War II: Battle of Voronezh (1942); Battle of Kursk; Battle of Prokhorovka; Operation Polkovodets Rumyantsev

Insignia
- Identification symbol: 2nd-Tank-Corps-Branch-Insig.png

The 2nd Tank Corps was a Red Army armoured formation that saw service during World War II on the Eastern Front. The unit had approximately the same size and combat power as a Wehrmacht Panzer Division, and less than a British Armoured Division had during World War II.

== History ==
The 2nd Tank Corps was formed in April 1942 in Gorky. Its command was accommodated in three chambers in Nizhny Novgorod Kremlin and its units were formed in winter camps around the city.

On 19 September 1943, it became the 8th Guards Tank Corps.

== Commanders ==
- Major General A. I. Lizyukov
- Colonel S. P. Maltsev
- Major General I. G. Lazarev
- Major General A. G. Kravchenko
- Major General A. M. Khasin
- Major General A. F. Popov
