= Pavel Rotmistrov =

Soviet military commander (1901–1982)

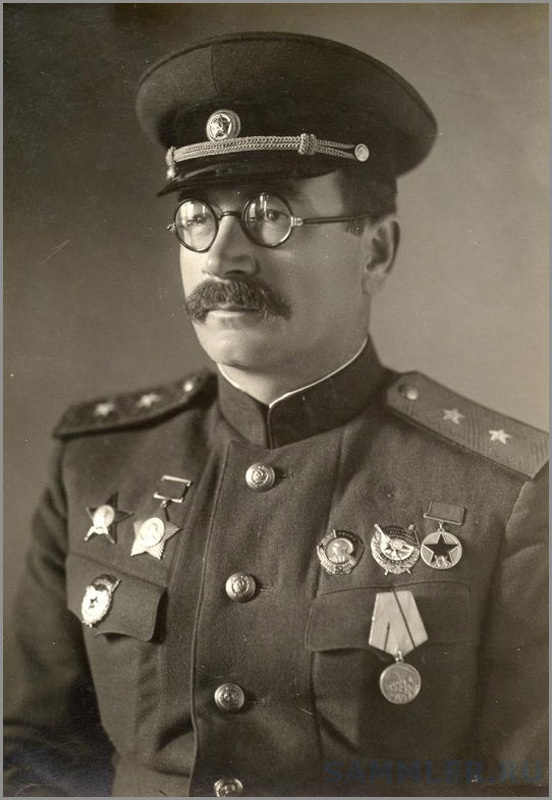
- Born: 6 July 1901; Skovorovo, Russian Empire
- Died: 6 April 1982 (aged 80); Moscow, Soviet Union
- Military career
- Allegiance: Soviet Union
- Service years: 1919–1968
- Rank: Chief marshal of the armored troops
- Commands: 3rd Guards Tank Corps; 5th Guards Tank Army
- Conflicts: Russian Civil War; Kronstadt rebellion; Polish–Soviet War; World War II; Winter War; Eastern Front; Operation Barbarossa; Battle of Moscow; Battle of Stalingrad; Operation Uranus; Belgorod–Kharkov offensive operation; Battle of Kursk; Battle of Prokhorovka; Operation Polkovodets Rumyantsev; Battle of the Lower Dnieper; Operation Bagration
- Awards: Hero of the Soviet Union
- Other work: Deputy Commander of the mechanized forces of the Group of Soviet Forces in Germany; Assistant Minister of Defense of the Soviet Union

Chief marshal of the armored troops Pavel Alexeyevich Rotmistrov (Russian: Павел Алексеевич Ротмистров; 6 July 1901 – 6 April 1982) was a Soviet military commander of armoured troops in the Red Army during and following World War II. He fought from the first days and was present in every major Soviet battle including Battle of Moscow, Battle of Stalingrad and for leading the 5th Guards Tank Army at the Battle of Prokhorovka at the Battle of Kursk. Rotmistrov became the first Marshal of the Soviet armoured troops.

== Pre-War ==
Rotmistrov joined the Red Army in 1919, and served during the Russian Civil War, during which he was involved in the suppression of the Kronstadt rebellion and in the Polish Soviet War. He commanded a platoon and later rifle company in 31st Rifle Regiment of 11th Rifle Division. In 1928 he entered Frunze Military Academy. From 1937 to 1940 he was an instructor at the Moscow Higher Military Academy. In May 1941 he became Chief of Staff of the 3rd Mechanised Corps.

== Second World War ==
Rotmistrov commanded his first tank battalion during the Soviet-Finnish War. He started the war against Germany with the 3rd Mechanised Corps, which was destroyed during Operation Barbarossa. He then commanded 8th Tank Brigade which was transferred to Kalinin Front during the Battle of Moscow. After several successful battles in the summer of 1942 he was sent to Stalingrad to be part of the 1st Guards Army. He commanded 5th Guards Tank Army in the Battle of Prokhorovka during the Battle of Kursk, and in Operation Bagration. The unit under his command, the 5th Guards Tank Army engaged in a brutal tank battle near Prokhorovka against the attacking Waffen SS divisions Leibstandarte SS Adolf Hitler, Das Reich and Totenkopf almost at a point-blank range of 100–200 meters. As the German advance was noticed, spearheaded by the three most elite Waffen SS divisions towards Prokhorovka advancing in force, Rotmistrov ordered a direct counterattack from the army that was prepared to go by radioing "Steel, Steel, Steel" against the Germans to get as close to them as possible to make up for the better guns the German tanks had. In the ensuing battle, a close-quarter open field tank battle ensued so that most shots from both sides were a direct hit. The distance between the forces was such that tanks were shooting each other from left and right one after another and close enough to ram the German tanks to disable their relatively powerful guns from turning.

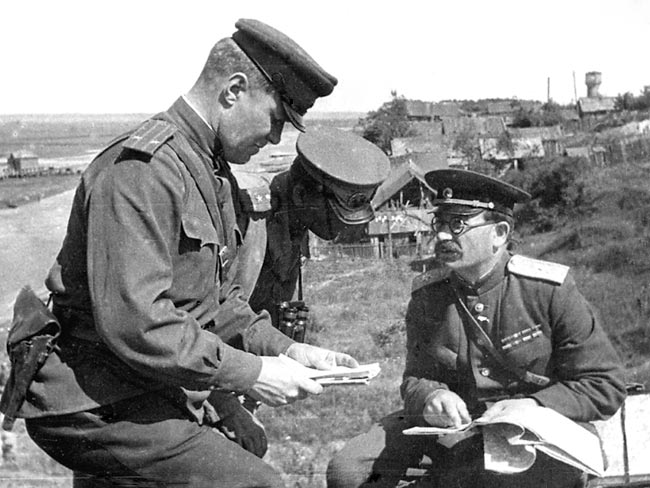
Pavel Rotmistrov giving commands to subordinate officers at Borissov (Belarus), 1944

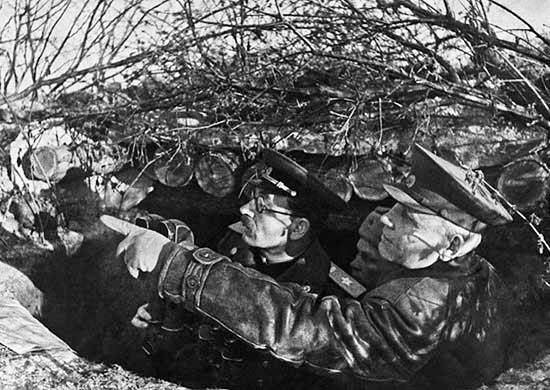
Pavel Rotmistrov and Ivan Konev at an observation post during the Korsun-Shevchenko offensive operation. Winter 1944.

As the battle ended, significant losses were reported from the 5th Guards Tank Army. He was removed from command following Bagration and became deputy head of armored troops at the General Staff. The manner in which he conducted the battle, including the heavy losses the 5th Guards Tank Army took was not unnoticed by Joseph Stalin, who planned to have Rotmistrov court-martialed and sacked for the heavy losses. This did not occur since Aleksandr Vasilevsky interceded. It is possible that the high losses incurred by the 5th Guards Tank Army at the Battle of Minsk led to his removal from command. It is notable that he never held an active unit command again. He was promoted to colonel-general in October 1943 and became the first Marshal of Armoured Troops in February 1944.

== Post-War ==
Following the war, he commanded the mechanized forces of the Group of Soviet Forces in Germany, and he became an assistant minister of defense. He became the first Chief Marshal of Armoured Troops on 28 April 1962.

== Awards and decorations ==
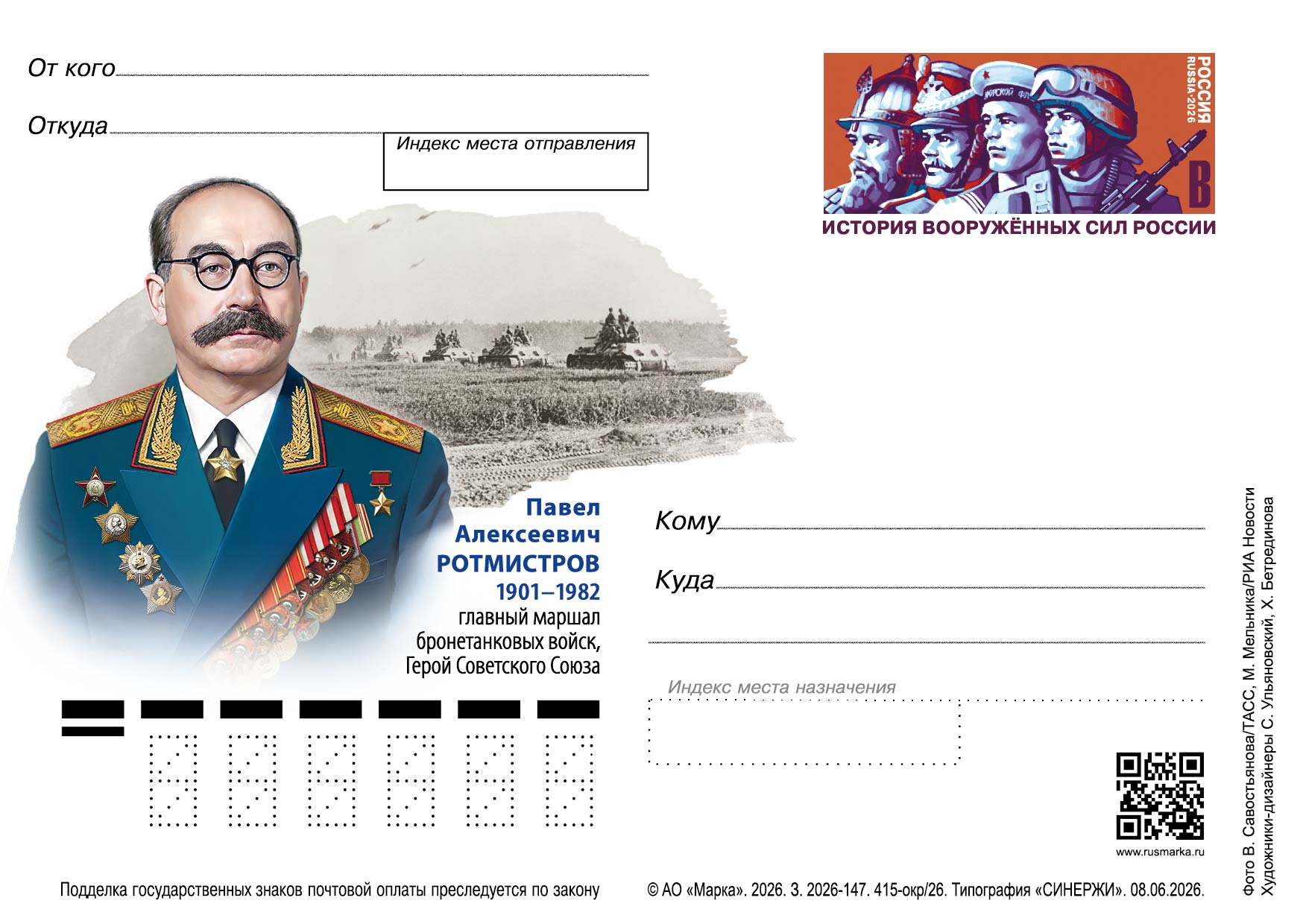
Rotmistrov on a 2026 postcard of Russia

Soviet Union

| Hero of the Soviet Union ("Gold Star» No. 10688, 7 May 1965) |
| Order of Lenin, seven times (5 May 1942, 27 July 1944, 21 February 1945, 22 June 1961, 7 May 1965, 3 July 1981) |
| Order of the October Revolution (22 June 1971) |
| Order of the Red Banner, four times (1921, 3 November 1944, 20 June 1949, 22 February 1968) |
| Order of Suvorov, 1st class (22 February 1944) |
| Order of Suvorov, 2nd class (9 January 1943) |
| Order of Kutuzov, 1st class (27 August 1943) |
| Order of the Red Star (3 July 1943) |
| Order for Service to the Homeland in the Armed Forces of the USSR, 3rd class (1975) |
| Medal "For the Defence of Stalingrad" (22 December 1942) |
| Medal "For the Defence of Moscow" (1 May 1944) |
| Medal "For the Victory over Germany in the Great Patriotic War 1941–1945" (9 May 1945) |
| Jubilee Medal "Twenty Years of Victory in the Great Patriotic War 1941-1945" (7 May 1965) |
| Jubilee Medal "Thirty Years of Victory in the Great Patriotic War 1941–1945" (25 April 1975) |
| Jubilee Medal "In Commemoration of the 100th Anniversary of the Birth of Vladimir Ilyich Lenin" (5 November 1969) |
| Jubilee Medal "XX Years of the Workers' and Peasants' Red Army" (22 February 1938) |
| Jubilee Medal "30 Years of the Soviet Army and Navy" (22 February 1948) |
| Jubilee Medal "40 Years of the Armed Forces of the USSR" (18 December 1957) |
| Jubilee Medal "50 Years of the Armed Forces of the USSR" (22 December 1967) |
| Jubilee Medal "60 Years of the Armed Forces of the USSR" (28 January 1978) |
| Medal "In Commemoration of the 800th Anniversary of Moscow" (20 September 1947) |

Foreign

| Silver Cross of the Virtuti Militari (Poland) |
| Medal "For Oder, Neisse and the Baltic" (Poland) |
| Medal "For Warsaw 1939-1945" (Poland) |
| Medal of Victory and Freedom 1945 (Poland) |
