= Kartashyovka =

Kartashyovka Карташёвка
- Selo
- Location within Belgorod Oblast Location within Russia
- Coordinates: 51°05′N 36°33′E
- Country: Russia
- Region: Belgorod Oblast
- District: Prokhorovsky District
- Time zone: UTC+3:00

Kartashyovka (Russian: Карташёвка) is a rural locality (a selo) in Prokhorovsky District, Belgorod Oblast, Russia. The population was 176 as of 2010.

== Geography ==
Kartashyovka is 18 km northwest of Prokhorovka (the district's administrative centre) by road. Suvorovo is the nearest rural locality.
