= 5th Guards Tank Army =

Soviet Army formation

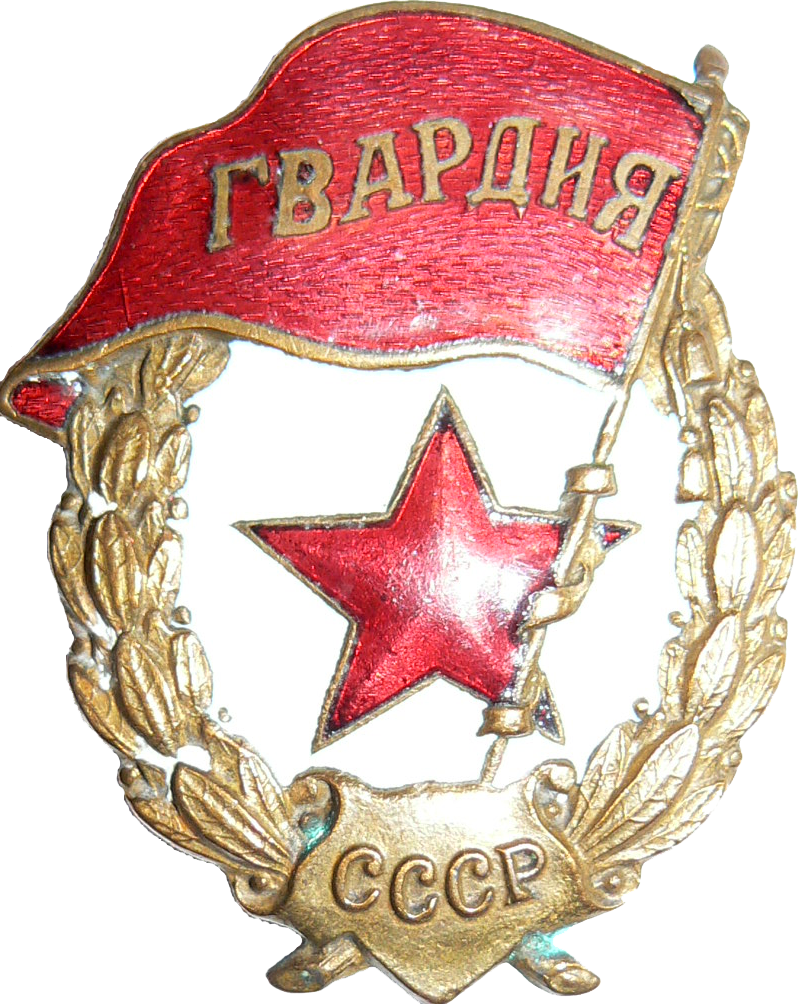
- Active: 1943–1992
- Country: Soviet Union
- Branch: Red Army / Soviet Army
- Type: Armored
- Garrison/HQ: Bobruisk (1946–1992)
- Engagements: World War II; Battle of Kursk; Battle of Korsun-Cherkassy; Operation Bagration
- Decorations: Order of the Red Banner

Commanders
- Notable commanders: Pavel Rotmistrov; Mikhail Panov; Mikhail Katukov; Semyon Kurkotkin; Mikhail Zaitsev

The 5th Guards Tank Army (Russian: 5-я гварде́йская та́нковая а́рмия) was a Soviet Guards armored formation which fought in many notable actions during World War II. The army was formed in February 1943. Until the aftermath of the Vilnius Offensive in July 1944, it was commanded by Pavel Rotmistrov.

Its organisation varied throughout its history, but in general included two or more Guards Tank Corps and one or more Guards Mechanised Corps. It was considered an elite formation. Under Red Army doctrine of deep operations, Tank Armies were primarily to be used for large-scale exploitation of major offensives. Once a breach in enemy lines had been made by other units (typically Shock Armies or combined-arms armies), the tank army would be inserted into the gap to drive deep into enemy territory, attacking rear areas and seizing major communications centers to disrupt enemy reactions. Tank armies were expected to penetrate up to several hundred kilometers into the enemy rear.

After the war, the 5th Guards Tank Army moved to the Belorussian Military District. It was downsized to division size in late 1946 and became a mechanized army in 1948. The designation "5th Guards Tank Army" was restored in 1957. The army was taken over by the Belarus Ground Forces in June 1992 and became an army corps two months later. The 5th Guards Army Corps was disbanded in 2001. Its headquarters became the headquarters of the Belarus Ground Forces.

== World War II ==
The 5th Guards Tank Army was formed on 25 February 1943 based on a Stavka order of 10 February 1943. It was part of the Reserve of the Supreme High Command (the Stavka Reserve). The army included the 3rd Guards and the 29th Tank Corps, the 5th Guards Mechanized Corps, the 994th Night Bomber Aviation Regiment, artillery and other smaller units.

=== Battle of Kursk ===
In 1943, it played a significant role in the Battle of Kursk, being one of the formations tasked with the counterattack at the Battle of Prokhorovka. Subordinated to the Steppe Front, at Kursk the Army controlled the 18th Tank Corps, 29th Tank Corps, 2nd Tank Corps, 5th Guards Mechanised Corps plus smaller units, with a total of approximately 850 tanks. Early in 1944, it took part in the reduction of the Korsun-Cherkassy Pocket.

=== Operation Bagration ===
In June 1944, the 5th Guards Tank Army was used as the main exploitation force during the Soviet summer offensive, Operation Bagration. The formation was committed to an attack along and parallel to the main Moscow–Minsk road, following initial breakthroughs by the rifle divisions of 11th Guards Army, and was instrumental in completing the encirclement and destruction of German forces at Minsk. It was then employed in the third phase of Operation Bagration. High casualties in this campaign, however, led to the unit's commander Lieutenant-General Pavel Rotmistrov being relieved of command and replaced with Vasily Volsky.

=== Baltic Offensive ===
Late in 1944, the 5th Guards Tank Army was committed against 3rd Panzer Army as part of the Baltic Offensive, pushing the German forces into a pocket at Memel. It was then moved south and took part in the East Prussian Operation as part of Konstantin Rokossovsky's 2nd Belorussian Front; driving to the coast at Elbing, it successfully cut off the Wehrmacht forces in East Prussia in what became known as the Heiligenbeil pocket.

However, by March 1945, the 5th Guards Tank Army was being drawn down, with the subordinate 10th Tank Corps moved first to direct subordination of the 3rd Belorussian Front and then the STAVKA Reserve by 1 April 1945. This left the 5th Guards Tank Army with a single tank corps, the 29th, under its control. This reduction in strength coincided with the hospitalization of the 5th GTA's commanding general, Vasily Volsky, for tuberculosis. Volsky did not return to the army (he died in February 1946) and Major General Maxim Sinenko took command from 16 March 1945 to the end of the war.

In early April 1945, the army moved to a position on the Baltic coast and attacked on 9 April 1945 to clear German defensive positions by the mouth of the Vistula River. For this operation, the army no longer controlled the 29th Tank Corps, but had attached the 98th Rifle Corps and the 1st Polish Tank Brigade. This operation continued until the end of the war.

After the war, Rotmistrov wrote a memoir and history of the unit, The Steel Guards.

== Cold War ==
In July 1945, the army was relocated to Slutsk, part of the Baranovichi Military District. In February 1946, it moved to Bobruisk, after the Baranovichi and Minsk Military Districts had been combined into the Belorussian Military District. The army moved to Belarus with the 8th Guards and 29th Tank Divisions, and the 8th Mechanized Division, all formed from the corps of the same numbers after the end of the war. There, the 8th Mechanized Division was transferred and the newly created 15th Guards and 12th Mechanized Divisions joined the army. The army was briefly redesignated the 5th Guards Mechanized Army on 12 June 1946, and was reduced to the mobilization 5th Guards Mechanized Division (or 5th Separate Guards Tank Division (mobilization)) on 31 October 1946, with its divisions reduced to regiments. The unit was expanded into the 5th Guards Mechanized Army on 28 October 1948 as Cold War tensions increased. In the early 1950s, the 22nd Mechanized Division replaced the 15th Guards. By 1955 the army numbered 1,219 tanks and self-propelled guns, including 161 IS-4, 893 T-54, sixteen T-34/85, 75 PT-76, and 74 ISU-122, 24 ZSU-57 self-propelled anti-aircraft guns, and 705 guns. From then until the late 1980s the army's composition remained virtually unchanged – only the mechanized divisions were redesignated in 1957.

On 20 May of that year, the army was redesignated as the 5th Guards Tank Army. The 22nd Mechanized became the 36th Tank Division, then the 193rd in 1965, while the 12th Mechanized Division became the 5th Heavy Tank Division and was disbanded in 1960. On 21 February 1974, the army was awarded the Order of the Red Banner. In August 1979, the 84th Motor Rifle Division (a mobilization unit) was attached to the army at Marina Gorka after transferring from the 28th Army; it was disbanded in 1987. Until the late 1980s, the army included three tank divisions – the 8th Guards at Marina Gorka, the 29th at Slutsk, and the 193rd at Bobruisk-25. Support units included the 302nd Anti-Aircraft Rocket Brigade at Marina Gorka, the 460th Rocket (formed 1988) and 306th Gun Artillery Brigades at Osipovichi, and the 56th Anti-Aircraft Rocket Brigade at Slutsk.

In 1990, as the Cold War drew to a close, the 8th Guards and 29th Tank Divisions were reduced to storage bases. To replace the 8th Guards, the 30th Guards Motor Rifle Division, withdrawn from the Central Group of Forces in Czechoslovakia, joined the army. By November of that year, according to CFE Treaty data, the army fielded 238 T-72 tanks, 381 infantry fighting vehicles, and 228 guns, mortars, and MLRS.

== Belorussian Army ==
In June 1992 the army was taken over by Belarus after the dissolution of the Soviet Union, and on 12 August 1992 renamed 5th Guards Army Corps.

The 5th Guards Army Corps was still active in September 2001, when the Belarus Minister of Defence, General Lieutenant Leonid Maltsev, congratulated the remaining Belarus Guards units on 60 years of existence. However, later in 2001, the headquarters of the Ground Forces of the Armed Forces of Belarus was established on its basis.

There is a memorial to the soldiers of the 5th Guards Tank Army at Znamianka, Kirovograd Oblast, in Ukraine.

== Commanders ==
The following officers commanded the army.

- Marshal of Tank Troops Pavel Rotmistrov (22 February 1943 – 8 August 1944)
- Colonel General Mikhail Solomatin (9 August 1944 – 18 August 1944)
- Colonel General Vasily Volsky (19 August 1944 – 16 March 1945)
- Lieutenant General Maxim Sinenko (16 March 1945 – January 1946)
- Colonel General Mikhail Solomatin (January-26 April 1946)
- Lieutenant General Pavel Poluboyarov (27 April 1946 – 23 March 1949)
- Lieutenant General Mikhail Panov (23 March 1949 – 17 September 1951)
- Colonel General Mikhail Katukov (17 September 1951 – 23 June 1955)
- Lieutenant General Pyotr Kalininchenko (23 June 1955 – 16 April 1958)
- Lieutenant General Vladimir Smirnov (13 May 1958 – 7 May 1960)
- Lieutenant General Semyon Kurkotkin (7 May 1960 – 28 January 1965)
- Lieutenant General Boris Likhachev (28 January 1965 – 13 November 1967)
- Lieutenant General Saltan Magometov (13 November 1967 – 2 December 1969)
- Lieutenant General Mikhail Zaitsev (2 December 1969 – 11 August 1972)
- Lieutenant General Valery Belikov (11 August 1972 – 20 May 1974)
- Lieutenant General Vitaly Saltykov (3 June 1974 – 5 November 1976)
- Lieutenant General Ivan Gashkov (5 November 1976 – July 1979)
- Lieutenant General Pyotr Ledyayev (July 1979 – 1982)
- Lieutenant General Vyacheslav Khaydorov (1982–1984)
- Lieutenant General Valery Fursin (1984–1987)
- Lieutenant General Anatoly Ushakov (1987–1989)
- Major General Valery Lagoshin (1989-2 May 1991)
- Lieutenant General Stanislav Rumyantsev (3 May 1991 – 12 September 1992)

== Notes ==
=== Bibliography ===
- Feskov, V.I.; Golikov, V.I.; Kalashnikov, K.A.; Slugin, S.A. (2013). Вооруженные силы СССР после Второй Мировой войны: от Красной Армии к Советской [The Armed Forces of the USSR after World War II: From the Red Army to the Soviet: Part 1 Land Forces] (in Russian). Tomsk: Scientific and Technical Literature Publishing. ISBN 9785895035306.
- Glantz, David M. 'Companion to Colossus Reborn' Univ. Press of Kansas, 2005.
