= Belgorod–Kharkov offensive operation =

German forces defeat by Red army in 1943

Belgorod-Kharkov offensive operation
- Part of the Eastern Front of World War II
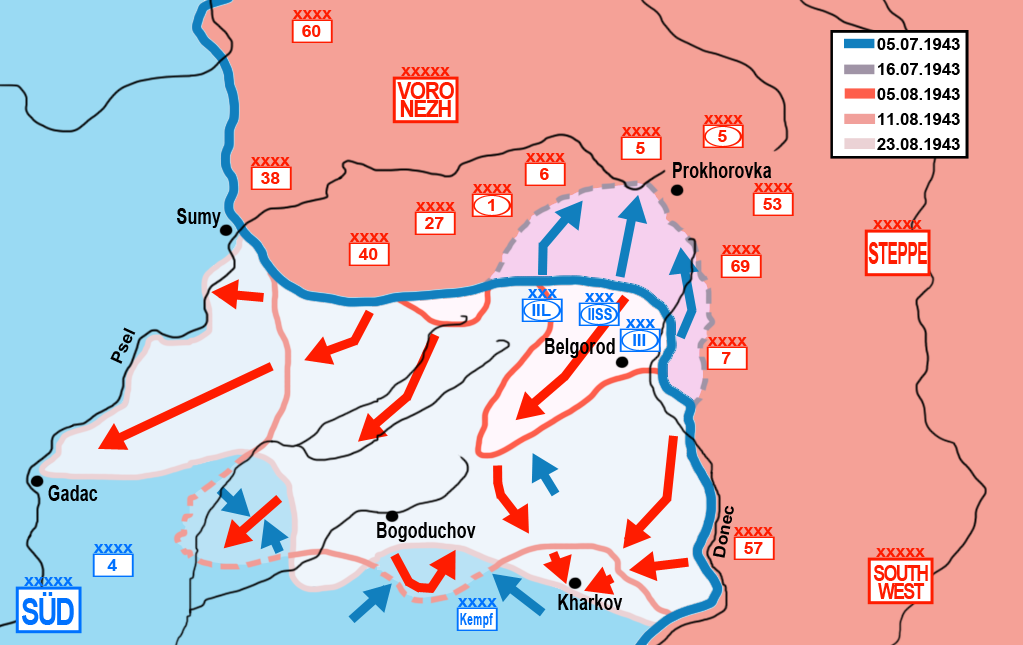
- Map of the offensive
Date	3–23 August 1943 (2 weeks and 6 days)
Location	Kharkov region, Ukrainian SSR, Soviet Union
Result	Soviet victory

Belligerents
Germany	Soviet Union

Commanders and leaders
Erich von Manstein; Hermann Hoth; Werner Kempf	Georgy Zhukov; Nikolai Vatutin; Ivan Konev

Strength
210,000 men 237 tanks and assault guns at the outset	1,144,000 men 2,418 tanks 13,633 guns and rocket launchers

Casualties and losses
25,068–26,289 8,933–10,154 killed or missing 16,135 wounded 240 tanks lost unknown guns	177,586–255,566 43,282–71,611 killed or missing 183,955 wounded 1,864 tanks lost 423 artillery guns 153 aircraft

The Belgorod–Kharkov strategic offensive operation, or simply Belgorod–Kharkov offensive operation, was a Soviet strategic summer offensive that aimed to liberate Belgorod and Kharkov, and destroy Nazi German forces of the 4th Panzer Army and Army Detachment Kempf. The operation was codenamed Operation General Rumyantsev (Russian: Полководец Румянцев), after the 18th-century Field Marshal Peter Rumyantsev and was conducted by the Voronezh and Steppe Fronts (army groups) in the southern sector of the Kursk Bulge. The battle was referred to as the Fourth Battle of Kharkov (German: Vierte Schlacht bei Charkow) by the Germans.

The operation began in the early hours of 3 August 1943, with the objective of following up the successful Soviet defensive effort in the Battle of Kursk. The offensive was directed against the German Army Group South's northern flank. By 23 August, the troops of the Voronezh and Steppe Fronts had finally liberated Kharkov from German occupation and it was the last time that Kharkov changed hands on the Eastern Front. The operation led to the retreat of the German forces in Ukraine behind the Dnieper River and set the stage for the Second Battle of Kiev in autumn 1943.

== Background ==
Operation Polkovodets Rumyantsev had been planned by Stavka to be the major Soviet summer offensive in 1943. However, due to heavy losses sustained during the Battle of Kursk in July, time was needed for the Soviet formations to recover and regroup. The operation commenced on 3 August, with the aim of defeating the 4th Panzer Army, Army Group Kempf, and the northern wing of Army Group South. It was also hoped that the German 1st Panzer Army and the newly reformed 6th Army would be trapped by an advance of the Red Army forces to the Azov Sea.

The Soviet forces included the Voronezh Front and the Steppe Front, which deployed about 1,144,000 men with 2,418 tanks and 13,633 guns and rocket launchers for the attack. Against this, the German army could field 210,000 men and 237 tanks and assault guns.

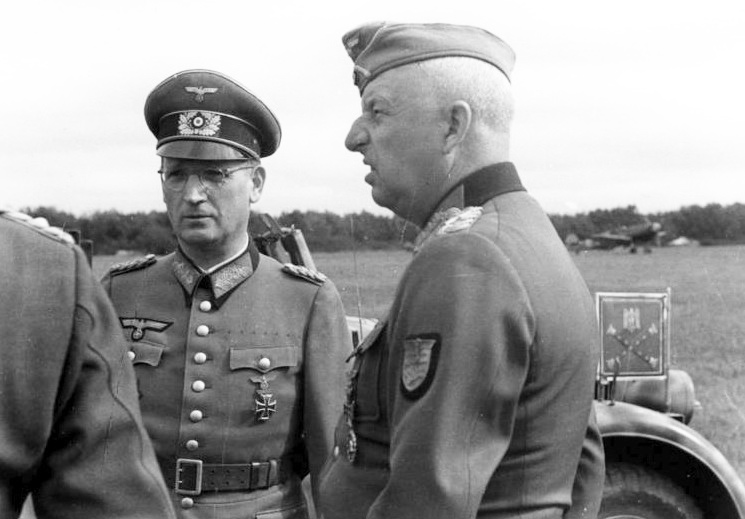
Erich von Manstein (right) and his chief of staff Hans Speidel

When the Soviet Southwestern Front and Southern Front launched diversionary attacks across the Donets and Mius Rivers, respectively, in an apparent attempt to cut off the German forces extended in the southern portion of the German Army Group South on 17 July, its commander General Erich von Manstein responded by moving the II SS Panzer Corps and XXIV Panzer Corps southward to blunt the Soviet offensive. As intended, these Soviet operations drew off German forces from the main thrust of the Soviet offensive, dissipating the German reserve in anticipation for their main drive.

The Soviet plan called for the 5th and 6th Guards Armies, and the 53rd Army, to attack on a 30-kilometer wide sector, supported by a heavy artillery concentration, and break through the five successive German defensive lines between Kursk and Kharkov. The former two armies had borne the brunt of the German attack in Operation Citadel. Supported by two additional mobile corps, the 1st Tank Army and the 5th Guards Tank Army, both mostly re-equipped after the end of Operation Citadel, would act as the front's mobile groups and develop the breakthrough by encircling Kharkov from the north and west. Mikhail Katukov's 1st Tank Army was to form the westward-facing outer encirclement line, while Pavel Rotmistrov's 5th Guards Tank Army would form the inner line, facing the city. A secondary attack to the west of the main breakthrough was to be conducted by the 27th and 40th Armies with the support of four separate tank corps. Meanwhile, to the east and southeast, the 69th and 7th Guards Armies, followed later by the Southwestern Front's 57th Army, were to join the attack.

== Offensive operation ==
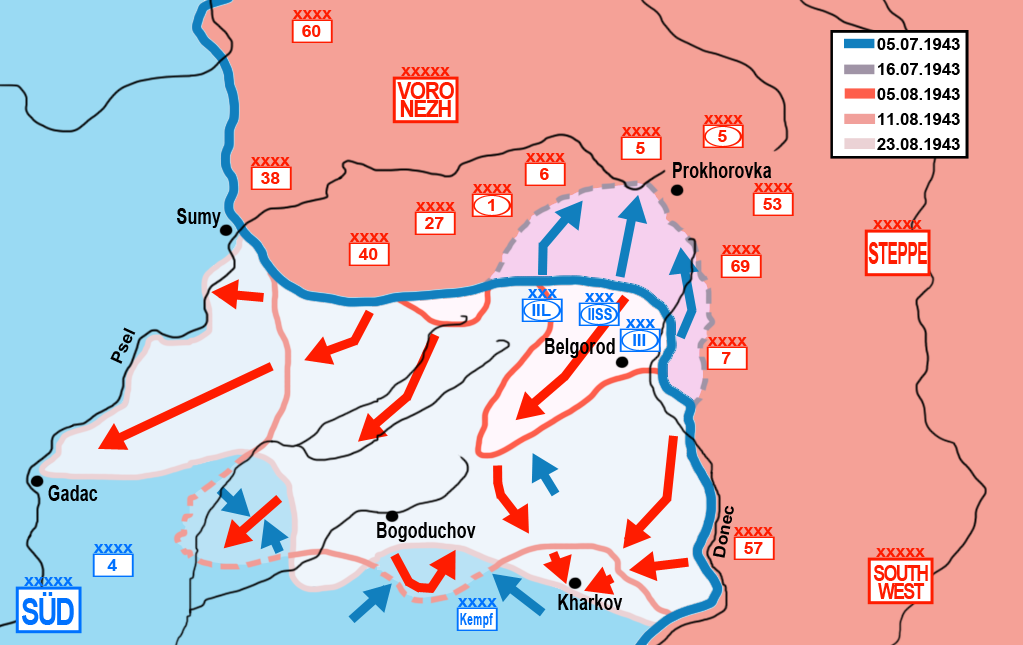
Operation Polkovodets Rumyantsev

The Soviet operation was executed in two primary axes: one in the Belgorod–Kharkov axis and another in the Belgorod–Bogodukhov axis. On 3 August, the offensive was begun with a heavy artillery barrage directed against the German defensive positions. Though the German defenders fought tenaciously, the two tank armies committed to the battle could not be held back. By 5 August the Soviets had penetrated the German defensive lines between Tomarovka and Belgorod at the boundary of the 4th Panzer Army and Army Detachment Kempf, advanced into the rear areas some 60 km, and liberated Belgorod from Raus's XI Corps. Delivering powerful blows from the north and east, the attackers overwhelmed the German defenders. By 7 August the Soviets had advanced to the Akhtyrka–Bogodukhov–Olshany–Zolochev line along the banks of the Merla River and formed a deep bulge in the front line.

German reserves were shifted south from the Orel sector and north from the Donbas region in an attempt to stem the tide and slow down the Soviet attacks. Success was limited to the Panzergrenadier Division Großdeutschland delaying the 40th Army by a day. Seven panzer and motorized divisions making up the III Panzer Corps, along with four infantry divisions, were assembled to counterattack into the flank of the advancing Soviet forces but were checked. After nine days the SS Division Das Reich and the SS Division Totenkopf arrived and initiated a counterattack against the two Soviet Armies near Bogodukhov, 30 km northwest of Kharkov. In the following armoured battles of firepower and maneuver, the SS divisions destroyed a great many Soviet tanks. To assist the Soviet 6th Guards Army and the 1st Tank Army, the 5th Guards Tank Army joined the battles. All three Soviet armies suffered heavily, and the tank armies lost more than 800 of their initial 1,112 tanks. These Soviet reinforcements stopped the German counterattack, but their further offensive plans were blunted.

With the Soviet advance around Bogodukhov stopped, the Germans now began to attempt to close the gap between Akhtyrka and Krasnokutsk. The counterattack started on 18 August, and on 20 August "Totenkopf" and "Großdeutschland" met behind the Soviet units. Parts of two Soviet armies and two tank corps were trapped, but the trapped units heavily outnumbered the German units. Many Soviet units were able to break out, while suffering heavy casualties. After this setback the Soviet troops focused on Kharkov and captured it after heavy fighting on 23 August.

== Liberation of Kharkov ==
Following its withdrawal from Belgorod on the night of 5/6 August 1943, the XI Army Corps under the command of General Erhard Raus now held defensive positions south of the city between the Donets and Lopan Rivers north of Kharkov. The XI Army Corps consisted of a Kampfgruppe (battlegroup) from the 167th Infantry Division, the 168th, 106th, 198th, 320th Infantry Divisions, and the 6th Panzer Division, which acted as was the corps reserve. This constituted a deep salient east into Soviet lines and was subject to outflanking attempts on the corps left flank; Soviet armoured units had already appeared 20 miles behind the corps front line. XI Army Corps now made a series of phased withdrawals toward Kharkov to prevent encirclement.

Only reaching the final defenses north of the city on 12 August 1943, following breakthroughs by the 57th and 69th Armies in several sectors of the front-line, the disintegration of the 168th Infantry Division and after an intervention by the corps reserve. When its attempts to force a breakthrough in the Bogodukhov-Olshany-Zolochev met with frustration along the Merla River, the Steppe Front directed its assaults towards Korotich, a sector held by SS Division Das Reich, to cut the Poltava-Kharkov rail link. Fierce fighting ensued, in which Korotich was captured by the 5th Guards Mechanised Corps and subsequently recaptured by the Das Reich infantry, then to remain under German control, but the 5th Guards Tank Army (Pavel Rotmistrov) cut the rail link finally on 22 August 1943.

The loss of this line of communication was a serious blow to the ability of the Army Detachment Kempf to defend its positions around the city. This meant critical delays of supplies and reinforcements, and the unit's position was becoming increasingly untenable. The way to Poltava now remained open, but Soviet General Nikolai Vatutin hesitated to push through while the Germans flanking the gap held firm. Instead, he turned his left flank armies, the 5th Guards Tank Army and the 5th Guards Army, against the western front of Army Group Kempf where the 2nd and 3rd SS Panzer Divisions fought to keep the front angled south-westward away from Kharkov. On the weaker east front of Army Group Kempf, the Soviet 57th Army cleared the right bank of the Donets between Chuguyev and Zmiyev.

These threats had led to a request by General Werner Kempf to abandon the city on 12 August 1943. Manstein did not object, but Adolf Hitler countered with an order that the city had to be held "under all circumstances". After a prediction that the order to hold Kharkov would produce "another Stalingrad", on 14 August 1943 Kempf was relieved by Manstein who appointed General Otto Wöhler in Kempf's place. A few days later, Army Group Kempf was renamed the 8th Army. Kharkov now constituted a deep German salient to the east, which prevented the Red Army from making use of this vital traffic and supply centre. Following boastful reports made by Soviet radio that Soviet troops had entered the city, when in fact it was still held by XI Army Corps, Joseph Stalin personally ordered its immediate capture.

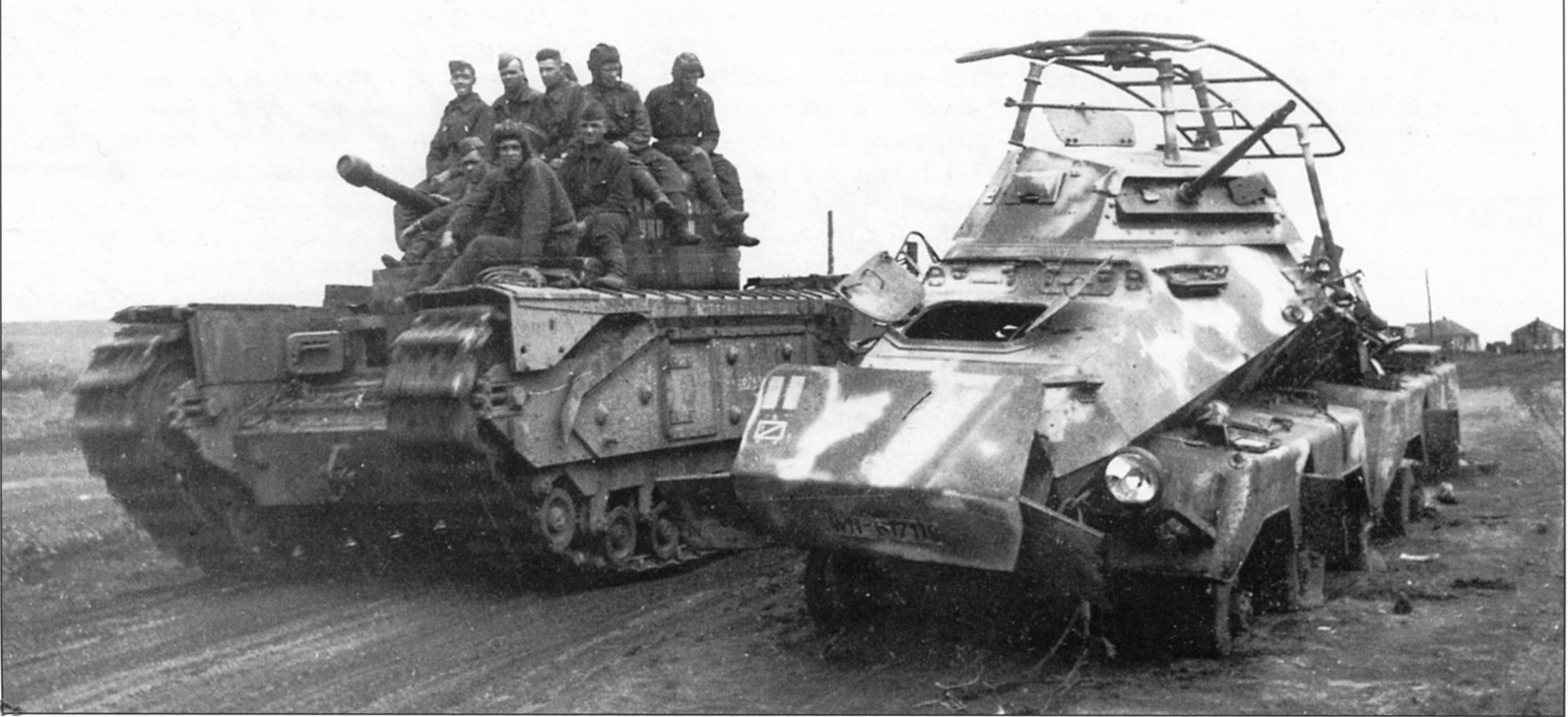
Soviet-manned Churchill Mk IV Tank during the battle in 1943

The German supply situation in Kharkov was now untenable; artillerymen, after firing their last rounds, were abandoning their guns to fight as infantry. The army's supply depot had five trainloads of spare tank tracks left over from Operation Citadel but very little else. The high consumption of ammunition in the last month and a half had cut into supplies put aside for the last two weeks of August and the first two weeks of September; until the turn of the month the army would have to get along with fifty percent of its daily average requirements in artillery and tank ammunition. XI Army Corps now had a combat strength of only 4,000 infantrymen, one man for every ten yards of front. Two days after taking command of 8th Army, Wöhler also asked Manstein for permission to abandon the city. Regardless of Hitler's demands, Wöhler and Manstein agreed that the city could not be held for long.

On 21 August 1943, Manstein gave his consent to abandon Kharkov. On 22 August 1943 the German troops began their retreat from the city, under pressure from the Red Army. The 57th and 69th Armies pushed in from three sides with the coming of daylight. The Soviets sensed that the Germans were evacuating Kharkov, due to the lessening of artillery fire and diminishing resistance in the front lines. Later in the day, thunderous explosions were heard as ammunition dumps were blown up. Large German columns were then observed leaving the city and the Soviet troops pushed into the largely destroyed city.

Moving out of Kharkov to the south, the German forces fought to hold open a corridor through which the 8th Army could withdraw. Soviet artillery and mortars shelled the corridor, and planes strafed and bombed the German columns. After dark, the 89th Guards and 107th Rifle Divisions broke into the interior of the city, driving the last German rearguard detachments before them. Enormous fires were set by the Germans as part of the scorched earth policy.

By 0200 on 23 August 1943, elements of the 183rd Rifle Division pushed into the city centre, reached Dzerzhinsky Square and met men from the 89th Rifle Division. The Soviet troops hoisted a red banner over the city once again. By 1100, Kharkov and its outskirts had been taken completely. The final battle for the city was over.

== Aftermath ==
By re-establishing a continuous front on Army Group South's left flank, the 4th Panzer Army and the 8th Army had, for the moment, blunted the Soviet thrust, but to the north and southeast fresh blows had already been dealt or were in the making. The Red Army, on the other hand, employed the rippling effect that marked their offensives: if thwarted in one place, they would quickly shift to others. Most importantly, the failure of the German offensive in the Battle of Kursk meant the Germans permanently lost the strategic initiative on the Eastern Front, although Hitler refused to acknowledge it. The defeat meant that, for the first time in the war, the Red Army had the full strategic initiative, and they used it well. Worse still, the large manpower losses of the Wehrmacht in July and August 1943 severely restricted Army Groups South and Centre's reactions to future Soviet thrusts during the winter of 1943 and in 1944, which was most evident in Operation Bagration during which the Red Army almost completely destroyed the German Army on the Eastern Front. Operations Polkovodets Rumyantsev, along with the concurrent Operation Kutuzov marked the first time in the war that the Germans were not able to defeat a major Soviet offensive during the summer and regain their lost ground and the strategic initiative.

Losses for the operation are difficult to establish due to large numbers of transfers and missing in action. Soviet casualties in the Belgorod–Kharkov sector during this operation are estimated to be 71,611 killed and 183,955 wounded; 1,864 tanks, 423 artillery guns, and 153 aircraft were lost. German personnel losses were at least 10,000 killed and missing and 20,000 wounded. German tank losses are estimated to be several times lower than Soviet tank losses.

== See also ==
- First Battle of Kharkov
- Second Battle of Kharkov
- Third Battle of Kharkov
