= 22nd Guards Rifle Division =

22nd Guards Rifle Division (March 17, 1942 – November 16, 1942) 22nd Guards Rifle Division (April 19, 1943 - 1946)
- Active: 1942–1946
- Country: Soviet Union
- Branch: Red Army
- Type: Division
- Role: Infantry
- Engagements: Battles of Rzhev; Battle of Smolensk (1943); Orsha Offensives (1943); Battle of Nevel (1943); Pskov-Ostrov Offensive; Baltic Offensive; Riga Offensive (1944); Courland Pocket
- Battle honours: Riga

Commanders
- Notable commanders: Maj. Gen. Karp Vasilyevich Sviridov; Col. Nikolai Olimpievich Ruz; Col. Grigorii Ivanovich Panishev; Col. Vasilii Ivanovich Morozov

The 22nd Guards Rifle Division was a division in the Soviet Armed Forces. The division was unique in being the only Guards rifle division formed twice during the Second World War. It was first formed from the 363rd Rifle Division in March 1942. Soon after forming it provided a command cadre for the second formation of the 53rd Army in Kalinin Front. Later, in the fall of that year, the division provided most of its personnel and equipment to form the new 2nd Guards Mechanized Corps, and was then disbanded. In April 1943, a new 22nd Guards was formed from the second formation of the 150th Rifle Division in the Moscow Military District, and went on to serve for the duration in 10th Guards Army. This formation first saw service in Operation Suvorov, the summer offensive of Western Front that liberated Smolensk in late September, and then fought through the autumn and winter in grinding battles towards the city of Orsha. During the summer offensive of 1944 it helped break the Panther Line in western Russia and then advanced into Latvia, winning a battle honor for its part in the liberation of Riga, before ending the war in Lithuania, helping to contain the German forces trapped in the Courland Pocket. It was disbanded shortly after the war.

== 1st Formation ==
The 363rd Rifle Division became the 22nd Guards on March 17, 1942, the same day its "sister" division, the 361st, became the 21st Guards Rifle Division, both in Kalinin Front. Its order of battle was as follows:

- 62nd Guards Rifle Regiment (from 1205th Rifle Regiment)
- 65th Guards Rifle Regiment (from 1207th Rifle Regiment)
- 67th Guards Rifle Regiment (from 1209th Rifle Regiment)
- 48th Guards Artillery Regiment (from 926th Artillery Regiment)
- 27th Guards Antitank Battalion
- 25th Guards Antiaircraft Battery
- 6th Guards Mortar Battalion
- 24th Guards Reconnaissance Company
- 17th Guards Sapper Battalion
- 30th Guards Signal Battalion
- 33rd Guards Medical/Sanitation Battalion
- 26th Guards Chemical Defense (Anti-gas) Company
- 34th Guards Motor Transport Company
- 18th Guards Field Bakery
- 19th Guards Divisional Veterinary Hospital
- 1437th Field Postal Station
- 736th Field Office of the State Bank

Col. Karp Vasilyevich Sviridov remained in command from the 363rd, and would hold this position throughout the first formation, being promoted to major general on October 1. It was part of Kalinin Front during its entire first formation, beginning in 30th Army before being moved to 11th Army. In April the division supplied the officers and men to form a new headquarters for the re-formed 53rd Army. Beginning on October 15 the 22nd Guards, over the course of the next four weeks, had most of its men and equipment used to create the 2nd Guards Mechanized Corps, and when this was completed on November 16, the division was disbanded.

== 2nd Formation ==
On April 19, 1943, a new 22nd Guards Rifle Division was formed, based on the second formation of the 150th Rifle Division, in accordance with a decree of the STAVKA dated April 16. At the time, the division was in the Reserve of the Supreme High Command in the Moscow Military District. Its order of battle was very similar to that of the first formation, with several exceptions as follow:

- 62nd Guards Rifle Regiment (from 469th Rifle Regiment)
- 65th Guards Rifle Regiment (from 647th Rifle Regiment)
- 67th Guards Rifle Regiment (from 756th Rifle Regiment)
- 48th Guards Artillery Regiment (from 328th Artillery Regiment)
- 432nd Antiaircraft Battery (until April 25, 1943)

The division did not include a mortar battalion. It inherited the "Siberian" (sometimes "Siberian Volunteer") honorific from the 150th, but not the "Stalin" title. It was under the command of Col. Nikolai Olimpievich Ruz from the day of its conversion. By June 1 the division was in the 10th Guards Army's 19th Guards Rifle Corps along with the 56th and 65th Guards Rifle Divisions. It would remain in this Army, mostly under command of this Corps, for the duration of the war.

== Operation Suvorov ==
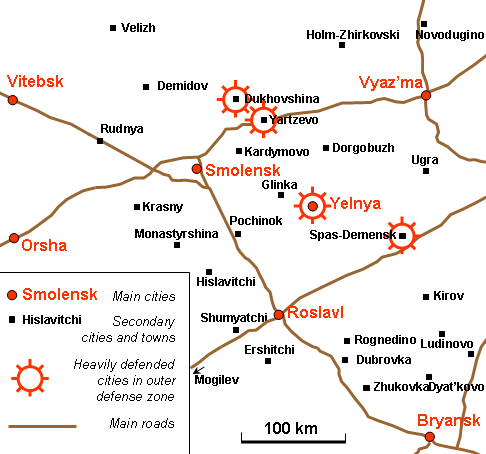
General layout of the Smolensk region during the battle.

The Front's main effort was made between Yelnya and Spas-Demensk by 10th Guards and 33rd Armies. The 10th Guards' 15th and 19th Guards Corps were deployed on a 10 km-wide sector between Mazovo and Sluzna; the 56th and 65th Guards Divisions were in the first echelon with the 22nd Guards in the second. Each division had about 8,000 personnel on strength. The 5th Mechanized Corps was assembled behind the Army, ready to exploit the expected breakthrough. The operational objective for the first day of the offensive was the town of Pavlinovo situated on the Smolensk - Spas-Demensk railway, 10 km to the south. The German defense in this sector was based on the Büffel-Stellung position, held by XII Army Corps. That Corps' 260th and 268th Infantry Divisions had both been reduced to just two infantry regiments and held very wide sectors, but the terrain was heavily wooded and dotted with numerous fortified villages. Furthermore, two key German positions at Gnezdilovo and nearby Hill 233.3 had not been identified by Soviet intelligence and so escaped the preparatory bombardment.

That bombardment began at 0440 hours and continued until 0630, consuming more than 50 percent of Western Front's available ammunition. Shortly after crossing the start line the 56th and 65th Guards ran into heavy resistance from the 499th Regiment of the 268th Infantry. That Division's artillery broke up the assault groups before they could make any progress while a pair of German assault guns picked off advancing T-34s of the supporting 119th Tank Regiment. However, here and there some small detachments found a way through. The 56th managed to carve out a 1 km-deep penetration near Kamenka but it was soon evident that 19th Guards Corps had been stopped cold. The 15th Guards Corps made somewhat greater progress against the portion of the 499th Regiment that it faced. By the early afternoon the commander of Western Front, Col. Gen. V. D. Sokolovsky, was already making command changes and committing additional forces. During the rest of the afternoon the 10th Guards Army's infantry gradually outflanked the remaining strongpoints of the 499th Regiment and once night fell the 268th Infantry was authorized to pull back 2–3 km to form a new line. Meanwhile, a battlegroup of the 2nd Panzer Division, de-training near Yelnya, was ordered to march to support that Division.

The offensive resumed at 0730 hours on August 8 after a 30-minute artillery preparation. The 65th Guards, now reinforced by the 22nd Guards and the 1st Assault Engineer-Sapper Brigade, remained stymied in front of Hill 233.3, held by a single German battalion. However the two German divisions were being drained by steady losses. A further effort by the two Guards divisions on August 9 was thrown back by a furious counterattack. The Hill was not finally taken until the evening of August 10 after a massive assault led by the reinforcing 29th Guards Rifle Division supported by the 23rd Tank Brigade. A few hours earlier the 56th Guards had captured the village of Delyagino, causing the German forces to retreat 2 km to the south. These gains unhinged the Büffel-Stellung and allowed 10th Guards Army to finally reach the Smolensk - Spas-Demensk railway; the XII Corps was now forced to trade space for time until Sokolovsky's offensive outran its logistical support. Western Front's artillery had already shot off almost all of its available ammunition.

On August 12 the 10th Guards Army made another major push and liberated Gnezdilovo. Despite German reinforcements by late afternoon XII Corps' front was crumbling and Soviet infantry and tanks were approaching Pavlinovo. Under the circumstances the Corps was ordered to evacuate Spas-Demensk overnight. By August 14 Sokolovsky brought the 21st Army into the 10th Guards Army's sector, allowing the latter to pull back for rest and rebuilding. While out of the line on August 17 Colonel Ruz was replaced in command by Col. Grigorii Ivanovich Panishev. On August 21 the STAVKA authorized a suspension of the offensive. German losses had been heavy, but the 10th Guards Army had also lost 30 percent casualties, although the 65th Guards had suffered the most.

=== The Liberation of Yelnya ===
The offensive was renewed on August 28, with the 10th Guards, 21st, 33rd and 68th Armies in the center of the Front making the main attack. The objective was to finally shatter the XII Army Corps and then push mobile groups through the gaps to seize Yelnya. At 0800 hours the Front began a 90-minute artillery preparation across a 25-km wide front southeast of that city. 10th Guards and 21st Armies attacked a German battlegroup around Terenino station, held by one infantry battalion and an engineer unit. German reserves were brought in and the battle see-sawed for about eight hours until the German battlegroup fell apart and began retreating to the Ugra River. In total the two Soviet armies advanced from 6 to 8 km. The next day the 10th Guards mopped up the German elements that had failed to make it over the Ugra and began pushing up the rail line toward Yelnaya. Despite intervention by the battlegroup of 2nd Panzer the 10th Guards pushed back the right flank of the 342nd Infantry Division with the 29th Guards Division and the 119th Tank Regiment in the lead. Yelnya was evacuated during the afternoon and was liberated on August 30.

From here it was only 75 km to Smolensk, but by September 3 the German 4th Army had patched up a tenuous new front west of Yelnya. General Sokolovsky continued local attacks through the first week of the month but his Western Front was again forced to a halt due to logistical shortages. He was authorized to pause the offensive for another week. During the night of September 14/15 Sokolovsky's center group of armies conducted aggressive probing all along the front of the German IX Army Corps which was holding a 40 km-wide line with five decimated divisions; known German positions were also pounded with artillery. At 0545 hours a 90-minute artillery preparation began, followed by an intense air bombardment. The ground attack began at 0715, south of the Smolensk - Yelnya railroad. At 1030 hours the 10th Guards Army struck the left flank of the 330th Infantry Division with a mass of infantry and tanks, pushing back two battalions. The Army, in cooperation with 21st Army, continued attacking into the afternoon, creating several small penetrations and advancing up to 3 km.

=== The Liberation of Smolensk ===
Overnight the 330th Infantry made minor withdrawals to straighten its front. On September 16 the 10th Guards Army, now led by 15th Guards Corps, failed to make any substantive gains. However it was clear by the end of the day that IX Corps was close to breaking and during the night it fell back to the next defensive line, which was mostly incomplete. Sokolovsky ordered a pursuit to approach Smolensk from the south with the 10th Guards and 68th Armies and most of his armor. The retreat of the 330th Infantry was covered by the Tiger tanks of heavy Panzer-Abteilung 505. Supply problems forced the Soviet armies to pause for a few days outside Smolensk before making the final push. On the morning of September 22 that push began and 68th Army made a clear breakthrough southeast of the city. Late on the 23rd German 4th Army signalled the evacuation of Smolensk. During the next day the Soviet forces probed the German defenses but did not begin their attacks until nightfall. By 0600 hours on September 25 most of Smolensk was liberated, although much of it was destroyed or damaged.

== Battles for Orsha ==
By October 2, 10th Guards Army had reached a line from Liady southwards along the Mereia River to the town of Baevo. Early on October 3 the Army launched an assault as part of Western Front's offensive on Orsha; 22nd Guards was in the first echelon of 19th Guards Corps with 65th Guards Rifle Division, prepared to attack across the river between Kiseli and Kovshichi, facing the boundary of 18th and 25th Panzer Grenadier Divisions. Fierce fighting developed for the crossing site at Kiseli, which was not overcome until 30th Guards Rifle Division finally took Liady on October 8 and 15th Guards Rifle Corps was able to commit 85th Guards Rifle Division from reserve to unhinge the river line. At this point the 19th Guards Corps finally crossed the river and joined the pursuit, which led to the eastern approaches to Dubrovno, 15 km east of Orsha, by the end of October 11. After a fast regrouping by 10th Guards Army the offensive was resumed the next day with the 22nd Guards leading its Corps on the left flank. Following an 85-minute artillery preparation the division stepped off, but almost immediately stalled due to the ineffectiveness of the artillery and armor. Ongoing assaults up to the 18th produced meager advances at considerable cost.

This was followed by another regrouping, which was recorded in the 22nd Guards divisional history:

"After turning its defensive sector over to 29th Guards Rifle Division, the division marched from Zverovichi through Krasnyi to Varechki on the night of 20 October, and concentrated west of Iurevka. At that time, our forces began an offensive along the Orsha axis. Our division was deployed in the corps' second echelon during the initial days of the offensive, but on 5 November it replaced units of 65th Guards Rifle Division and fought to penetrate the enemy's heavily fortified defensive belt along the approaches to Orsha."

This renewal of the offensive began early on October 21 after a two-hour-and-ten-minute artillery preparation which struck the first defensive line of the German 197th Infantry Division. The divisions of 31st Army in the first echelon punched through, advancing as much as 4 km deep, and were reinforced on the right the next day by 65th Guards. However, the advance that day was considerably less, in part due to heavy German artillery fire and an inability to reply due to shell shortages on the Soviet side. While the remainder of 10th Guards Army cleared German defenders from the bogs south of the Verkhita River, this was also at considerable cost, and a halt was called once again at the end of October 26. After replacing 65th Guards on November 5 (above), 22nd Guards continued intense fighting along the Orsha axis through most of the rest of the month.

"The Hitlerites launched 20 counterattacks against the division's units during just the three days from 14 through 16 November. The strongest counterattack struck 65th Regiment. Three ranks of up to 2,000 Hitlerites attacked the positions of the regiment, whose rifle companies at that time numbered 35 men each. At the critical moment, Guards Lieutenant Colonel M. A. Anikin, the regimental commander, made a singularly correct decision: to cover the enemy ranks with machine gun fire and then conduct a counterattack. Inspired by their commander and Guards Major Moskvin, his assistant for political affairs, the regiment rushed at the enemy, and the Germans, not able to withstand the hand-to-hand combat, ran back to their foxholes."

Despite these heroics the depleted Soviet divisions did not break through the German defenses, and finally went over to the defense before month's end.

== Baltic Campaign ==
On December 8, the STAVKA ordered that the 10th Guards Army be redeployed from Western Front to the 2nd Baltic Front, well to the north. It was intended to spearhead, along with the 3rd Guards Cavalry Corps, a new offensive northward from the Nevel salient towards Idritsa, beginning on January 10, 1944. In the event, 10th Guards required considerable replenishment of personnel, equipment and supplies and was not ready for that date. 19th and 7th Guards Rifle Corps shared a total of 10,500 personnel replacements during the move, which was finally completed on January 14.

As of July 1, prior to start of the summer campaign, the 22nd Guards was still in 19th Guards Corps of 10th Guards Army in 2nd Baltic Front. It was located just north of Novorzhev, facing the German Panther Line defenses. By one month later it had crossed the border into Latvia at Kārsava. On August 5 Guards Colonel Panishev left command of the division; he was replaced four days later by Col. Vasilii Ivanovich Morozov, who would hold this position until the end of the war.

Over the next six weeks the division made steady but unremarkable progress through eastern Latvia, reaching the vicinity of Lubāna by mid-September. By the first week in October it was on the approaches to Riga, southwest of Ogre. One week later the division received its only battle honor:

"RIGA"... 22nd Guards Rifle Division (Colonel Morozov, Vasilii Ivanovich)... The troops who participated in the liberation of Riga, by the order of the Supreme High Command of October 13, 1944, and a commendation in Moscow, are given a salute of 24 artillery salvoes from 324 guns.

According to Glantz, by the time of this battle, the 22nd was one of four Guards rifle divisions on this sector of the front that "were made up of Latvians." The division remained in Latvia and Lithuania for the duration. As of May 1, 1945, it was in the Kurland Group of Leningrad Front, helping to maintain the encirclement of the German forces in the Courland Pocket. For a Guards division, it held the rather meager title of 22nd Guards Rifle, Siberian, Riga Division (Russian: 22-я гвардейская стрелковая Сибирско-Рижская дивизия). Guards Colonel Morozov was promoted to major general on July 11.

Postwar, it was withdrawn to Võru in Estonia by October 1, 1945 as part of the 19th Guards Rifle Corps. It was disbanded there between 1 August 1946 and 1947.
