= 363rd Division =

363rd Division may refer to:

- 363rd Infantry Division, Wehrmacht, Germany, 1943–1944
- 363rd Volksgrenadier Division, Wehrmacht, Germany, 1944–1945
- 363rd Rifle Division, Soviet Union

== See also ==
- List of military divisions by number
- 363rd (disambiguation)
