= Aleksandr Maykov =

Soviet Army colonel

Aleksandr Glebovich Maykov
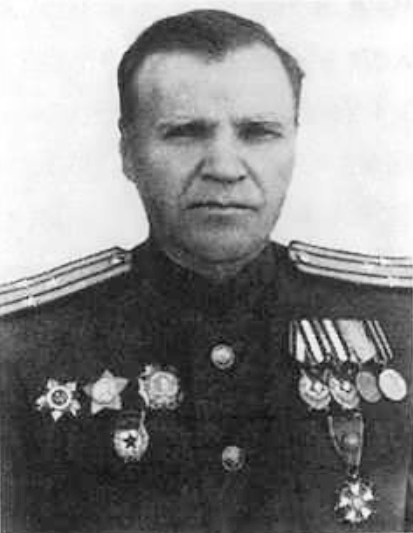
- Maykov in the late 1940s
- Born: 17 October 1902; Maykovo, Tomsk Governorate, Russian Empire
- Died: January 1977 (aged 74) Volgograd, Soviet Union
- Allegiance: Soviet Union
- Branch: Red Army
- Service years: 1924–1953
- Rank: Colonel
- Commands: 257th Rifle Division; 13th Separate Guards Rifle Brigade
- Conflicts: World War II
- Awards: Order of Lenin

Aleksandr Glebovich Maykov (Russian: Александр Глебович Майков; 17 October 1902 – January 1977) was a Soviet Army colonel who held divisional command during World War II. Maykov rose through a series of command positions in the prewar Red Army, and commanded replacement units in the first months after Germany invaded the Soviet Union. He commanded a battalion in the Battle of the Caucasus and was seriously wounded when his unit was wiped out in early August 1942. After recovering, Maykov served as a regimental commander and brigade deputy commander as the battle for the Caucasus continued. In mid-1943, he became deputy commander of the 257th Rifle Division, and succeeded to command the division in early 1944. Maykov led the 257th in the Crimean Offensive and the Soviet advance into the Baltic states, ending the war in the blockade of the Courland Pocket. Postwar, he served as a brigade deputy commander before retiring in the early 1950s.

== Early life and prewar service ==
A Russian, Aleksandr Glebovich Maykov was born on 17 October 1902 in the village of Maykovo, Nikolayevsky volost, Tomsky Uyezd, Tomsk Governorate. Conscripted into the Red Army on 1 May 1924, he was enrolled as a cadet in the regimental school of the 107th Rifle Regiment of the 36th Rifle Division, and after graduation in December served in the regiment as a squad commander and assistant platoon commander. Transferred to serve as a company starshina with the division's 106th Rifle Regiment on 10 October 1927, Maykov entered the Irkutsk Training Course for Infantry Commanders in August 1928. After completing the course in September 1929, Maykov was sent west to the 31st Rifle Division's 92nd Rifle Regiment in Stalingrad, where he served as a platoon and company commander. He became a member of the Communist Party in 1931.

Maykov was at the Vystrel course between 6 February and 31 March 1933. He returned to his unit, which was redesignated the 8th Separate Rifle Regiment on 21 January 1934 and relocated to the Soviet Far East, where it was assigned to the Suchan Fortified Region of the Pacific Fleet. With the regiment, Maykov served as a training company commander, acting battalion commander, and battalion chief of staff before returning to his previous position of training company commander. He entered the combined arms department of the Vystrel course on 29 November 1937. After graduation on 6 September 1938, he returned to the regiment to serve as commander of its training battalion. In December of that year, Maykov became chief of the school for junior command personnel of the 299th Mountain Rifle Regiment of the 4th Rifle Brigade of the 1st Separate Red Banner Army at Suchan after the 8th Regiment was expanded. In July 1939 Maykov rose to assistant commander of the regiment for combat units. In November 1940, he was transferred west to the Moscow Military District, becoming deputy commander for combat units of the 137th Rifle Division's 771st Rifle Regiment at Gorky.

== World War II ==
Five days after Germany invaded the Soviet Union, on 27 June 1941, Maykov, then a captain, was appointed commander of the 7th Reserve Rifle Regiment, a replacement unit at Gorky. Maykov was in the reserve of the district cadre department between August and October, before being appointed deputy commander of the 95th Reserve Rifle Regiment at Yefremov. In November, another reserve regiment was formed from this unit, after which both took part in the defense of the city. In early December, both regiments were evacuated to Cheboksary, and Maykov, then a major, was appointed commander of the 1st Separate Rifle Battalion of the 113th Separate Rifle Brigade, forming at Sarapul.

The brigade was sent to the North Caucasus in April 1942 and tasked with defending the coast in the region of Anapa. In early August, the brigade and its parent 1st Separate Rifle Corps were relocated by rail to positions near Armavir, assigned to the 9th Army of the Southern Front, to stop the advance of the German 13th Panzer and 16th Motorized Divisions and the 5th SS Panzer Division Wiking during the Battle of the Caucasus. Maykov's battalion was tasked with defending the stanitsa of Krasnaya Polyana, entering battle on 3 August. Communications with the brigade headquarters were immediately lost and its battalions fought on their own. In the bloody fighting, Maykov's battalion was forced to abandon the stanitsa and retreat to the city of Kropotkino. Maykov was seriously wounded on 4 August and evacuated to a hospital in Kutaisi. His battalion was almost entirely killed in three days of combat, and the brigade suffered heavy losses. The organizational disruption was such that Maykov was incorrectly reported missing.

After recovering, Maykov was appointed commander of the 276th Rifle Regiment of the 77th Azerbaijani Mountain Rifle Division in October. He led the regiment as the Battle of the Caucasus continued, with the division subordinated to the 58th Army of the Northern Group of Forces of the Transcaucasus Front. In February 1943, Maykov rose to deputy commander for combat units of the 62nd Separate Naval Rifle Brigade of the 56th Army of the North Caucasus Front's Black Sea Group of Forces. In this capacity he fought in the Krasnodar Offensive, during which the brigade advanced through flats towards the stanitsa of Chernoyerkovskaya and fought in the battles near Krymskaya. For his performance in the offensive, brigade commander Semyon Monakhov recommended Maykov for the Order of the Red Banner, which was awarded on 29 May. The recommendation read:

Lieutenant Colonel Comrade Maykov has served as brigade deputy commander for combat units since February 1943.

During the bitter battles with the German invaders, which the units of the brigade waged in the spring of this year in the regions of Chernoyerkovskaya and Svistelnikovo and the stanitsa of Krymskaya, Lieutenant Colonel Comrade Maykov, constantly with the operational units, displayed decisiveness and boldness, ensuring that all missions assigned to subordinates by the brigade commander were carried out.

He is a tactically competent commander, able to make decisions and carry them out in the most difficult situations of modern battle to secure success. Comrade Maykov in every way possible makes strict demands of unit commanders.

Under his direct leadership units of the brigade, breaking through sustained enemy resistance, took Chernoyerkovskaya, Svistelnikovo and other settlements on the Kuban.

He is deserving of a state award: the Order of the Red Banner.

In July, the 257th Rifle Division was formed from the 62nd Naval Rifle and 60th Rifle Brigades, and Maykov, by then a lieutenant colonel, continued to serve as deputy commander for combat units of the new division, and was promoted to colonel later in 1943. Assigned to the 56th Army, the division took defenses in the Krymskaya region on 8 July. In late August it was shifted to the 51st Army, taking part in the Donbass and Melitopol Offensives. In the battles near Melitopol, Maykov was wounded again on 17 October. On the night of 1–2 November, the division waded through the Sivash and took defenses on its southern bank, then fought to hold the bridgehead it seized. Maykov took command of the division in late March 1944, leading it through the rest of the war. The 257th took part in the Crimean Offensive between 8 and 11 April, breaking through the German defenses on the Sivash and liberating Sevastopol. Maykov's division was decorated with the Sivash honorific for its performance in the Sivash breakthrough and the Order of Suvorov, 2nd class for the liberation of Sevastopol. 10th Rifle Corps commander Konstantin Neverov recommended him for the Order of Kutuzov, 2nd class, which was upgraded to the Order of Suvorov, 2nd class and awarded on 16 May. The recommendation read:

Comrade Maykov, in the battles to hold the bridgehead in Crimea, and also during the breakthrough of the strongly fortified German defenses on the Urzhino axis, showed himself in battle to be a brave, decisive and fearless officer. After the seizure of a bridgehead in Crimea a solid defense was erected, the bridgehead expanded, and positions improved. Comrade Maykov made every effort to create a strong defense.

During the conduct of a local operation on 27 January 1944 to take Hill 17.4, two kilometers west of Urzhino, Krasnoperekopsky District, Comrade Maykov personally and the entire division showed high combat qualities – the height was taken by surprise, rapidly.

Based on the experience of the local operation Comrade Maykov prepared the division for the decisive offensive to break through the strongly fortified German defense.

Between 8 and 11 April 1944, during the offensive, bloody battles for Crimea, the division fulfilled its assigned missions: it destroyed the opposing enemy and reached positions in the Ishunsky District in cooperation with the 2nd Guards Army and pursued the enemy. On the most critical and weakest sectors of the fighting, Comrade Maykov displayed personal and rapid correction of shortcomings.

For the seizure and solid holding of a bridgehead in Crimea, for the accomplishment of the breakthrough of strong fortified German defenses in the division sector, that brought about the common defeat of the enemy in Crimea, he is deserving of the Order of Kutuzov, 2nd class.

After the end of the fighting in Crimea, the 257th and its parent 51st Army were withdrawn to the Reserve of the Supreme High Command, and relocated north to the 1st Baltic Front. Maykov led the division in the Šiauliai Offensive, the Baltic Offensive, and the Memel Offensive during the summer and fall of 1944. During these operations, the 257th took the towns of Biržai and Telšiai. For his performance in the summer and fall operations 1st Guards Rifle Corps commander Ivan Missan recommended Maykov for the Order of the Patriotic War, 1st class, in late September, which was awarded on 8 December. The recommendation read:

Comrade Maykov has been with the 1st Guards Rifle Corps since 26 August 1944. During this period the corps did not conduct active combat operations. The division under the command of Comrade Maykov held defenses, finely strengthening the engineering and anti-tank aspects of its line. He correctly distributed the division artillery and attached artillery and fully mined the tank-suitable approaches. Being with the 63rd Rifle Corps, he repulsed a series of enemy attacks and inflicted significant damage in personnel and equipment on him, in the period of the liberation of the Baltic alone 3,205 enemy soldiers and officers were killed...For skillful leadership of the regiments of the division and attached units, for successful repulse of enemy counterattacks and inflicting losses on him in personnel and equipment, for skillful organization of the defense of the frontline in engineering and anti-tank aspects, he is deserving of the state award of the Order of the Patriotic War, 1st class.

From 12 October, the 257th advanced along the Baltic Sea coast towards Libava, but was halted by German resistance and forced to go on the defensive on the approaches to the city. Maykov was hospitalized due to illness between November 1944 and February 1945. When he returned to command the division, the division was still holding its previous lines, assigned to the 4th Shock Army in the blockade of the Courland Pocket, where it remained for the rest of the war. For his performance in the blockade of the Courland Pocket, 92nd Rifle Corps commander Andrey Kuleshov recommended Maykov for the Order of Kutuzov, 2nd class in the final days of the war, but this was downgraded to the Order of Aleksandr Nevsky, awarded on 6 June 1945. The recommendation read:

In the position of division commander from March 1944.

The division was assigned to the corps on 5 February 1945. During the defensive battles of the division in the Baltic from October 1944, Colonel Maykov managed to organize the defense, impregnable to the enemy, despite the difficult terrain conditions of the Baltics.

The enemy repeatedly tried to break through to unite with his forces in East Prussia. Thanks to fine intelligence work the plans of the enemy were found out and suffered failure. The enemy suffered great losses in personnel and equipment. Colonel Maykov personally was brave and valiant, in difficult moments of the battle often appeared in forward lines, raising the personnel to feats.

For personal courage and organization of impregnable defenses with the infliction of heavy losses on the enemy, he is deserving of the Order of Kutuzov, 2nd class.

== Postwar ==
Postwar, Maykov continued to command the 257th Rifle Division. The division was disbanded at Tambov in December 1945, and, in April 1946, Maykov was appointed commander of the 88th Guards Rifle Regiment of the 33rd Guards Rifle Division of the Moscow Military District at Rzhev. He was soon transferred to serve as deputy commander of the 13th Separate Guards Rifle Brigade of the district in July. Maykov temporarily commanded the brigade between December 1946 and 5 May 1947. In January 1948, he was transferred to the North Caucasus Military District to serve as deputy commander of the 18th Separate Rifle Brigade, stationed in Stalingrad. Maykov was transferred to the reserve on 12 August 1953, retiring in Volgograd, where he died in January 1977.

== Awards ==
Maykov was a recipient of the following decorations:

- Order of Lenin
- Order of the Red Banner (2)
- Order of Suvorov, 2nd class
- Order of Aleksandr Nevsky
- Order of the Patriotic War, 1st class
- Officer of the Legion of Merit (United States) (1944)
