= 319th Rifle Division =

- Active: 1941–1946
- Country: Soviet Union
- Branch: Red Army
- Type: Infantry
- Size: Division
- Engagements: Battle of the Caucasus; Baltic Offensive; Riga Offensive; Vistula-Oder Offensive; Battle of Königsberg
- Decorations: Order of the Red Banner (3rd formation)
- Battle honours: Dvinsk (3rd formation)

Commanders
- Notable commanders: Col. Fyodor Andreevich Volkov; Kombrig Semyon Monakhov; Col. Nikolai Matveevich Uralsky; Col. Dmitry Arsentievich Dulov

The 319th Rifle Division was first formed in December 1941, as a standard Red Army rifle division, in the Moscow Military District, but after a month was redesignated as the 2nd formation of a pre-war division that had been destroyed and disbanded. Another 319th was formed in the summer of 1942 in the North Caucasus Military District while the German offensive was threatening the Soviet oilfields near Baku. This formation had a short and undistinguished career, seeing little combat, and was disbanded in December. A third and final 319th was formed in the autumn of 1943 in the northern part of the front. This unit gave very creditable service for the duration of the war, distinguishing itself in the fighting through the Baltic states, and completing its combat path in East Prussia. It continued to serve briefly into the postwar period.

== 1st Formation ==
The division began forming for the first time on December 19, 1941 at Balakhna, just north of Gorkiy, in the Moscow Military District. Col. Fyodor Andreevich Volkov took command on that date, remaining in command for the duration of the 1st formation. Its basic order of battle was as follows:

- 1336th Rifle Regiment
- 1341st Rifle Regiment
- 1344th Rifle Regiment
- 1014th Artillery Regiment

While still forming up the 319th was re-designated as the 2nd formation of the 145th Rifle Division on January 19, 1942.

== 2nd Formation ==
A new division began forming from late July to August 4, 1942 at Makhachkala in the North Caucasus Military District. On the latter date Semyon Monakhov, who still held the pre-war rank of Kombrig, was appointed as commander. At the time of its formation it was noted that about 70 percent of the division's personnel were of Caucasian nationalities. Its order of battle remained the same as that of the first formation.

The division was formed very fast, because the front lines were approaching Makhachkala on the coast of the Caspian Sea as it was being put together. It was assigned to the reserves of Transcaucasus Front by September 1, and less than a month later was in the 58th Army behind the defensive front along the Terek River.

"There are several indications that this division was even more poorly equipped, trained, and combat-ready than even the beat up divisions that had retreated into the Caucasus from the earlier disasters at Kharkov and Izyum. First, the original division commander was a Kombrig, an obsolete rank replaced by general's rank in 1940. Whenever someone shows up in the active army with one of these obsolete titles it usually means the officer is a reservist who hasn't seen active service since before 1940, or an officer released from the GULAG who is still carrying the rank he had before he was arrested. Neither indicates a division commander with recent positive experience or training!"

In fact, Kombrig Monakhov had been the Senior Deputy Inspector of Infantry in Odessa Military District at the outbreak of the war, and had since commanded the 421st and 388th Rifle Divisions.

On September 29, Lt. Gen. I.I. Maslennikov, commander of the Transcausasus Front's Northern Group of Forces, received orders for defense of the region from the STAVKA, including the following: "[Occupy] a defensive line along the Sulak River with 416th and 319th Rifle Divisions..." In late October, when the German forces had renewed their offensive, the division was still in second echelon, protecting the Makhachkala axis. On October 26, as the offensive gathered steam, the 319th was finally ordered into the front lines. On November 2, Kombrig Monakhov was replaced in command by Col. Nikolai Georgievich Selikhov. The division helped to bring the German drive to a halt just west of Ordzhonikidze on November 5, and even drive the panzer spearheads back, but at considerable cost. When 3rd Rifle Corps of 9th Army began a counteroffensive on November 13, its 275th and 319th had a combined total of only 8,000 men. On November 20, orders were received from the STAVKA to disband these two divisions, plus the 295th, and use their personnel, weapons and transport to fill out 2nd Guards Rifle Division.

== 3rd Formation ==
A third 319th Rifle Division began forming on the last day of September 1943, near Kholm in the Northwestern Front, under the command of Col. Nikolai Matveevich Uralsky. It was based on the men and equipment of the 32nd and 33rd Rifle Brigades.

=== 32nd Rifle Brigade ===
This brigade began forming in October 1941, in the Arkhangelsk Military District. It appears that no existing units were used as a cadre, because the brigade spent several extra months in the rear, unlike most of the 1941 rifle brigades. When it left for the front in February 1942, it was assigned to the 4th Guards Rifle Corps in 54th Army of Leningrad Front. The brigade's first fighting took place as part of the Lyuban Offensive Operation in March. The Army's report of March 21 stated:

"Attacking in the direction of Lyuban, the 32nd Rifle Brigade encountered swamps that it could not overcome in the winter. With an impenetrable marsh in their front, the enemy was not worried. However, Sergei Polikarpovich Ketiladze, the brigade commander, outwitted the Hitlerites. He led the soldiers in an envelopment and the brigade struck the enemy by surprise at first light on March 21. The Fascists were forced back, not even managing to withdraw their warehouses from Milaevka and Didvina. It was only 11 kilometres straight from Didvina to Lyuban. During the next three hours, the 32nd Brigade captured yet another village, Kordynei. This considerably eased the situation in the neighboring division, and it occupied the villages of Zenino and Dobroe."

Despite these successes, the Lyuban Operation was ultimately a failure, and the brigade was eventually forced to fall back to the line of the Volkhov River.

54th Army became part of Volkhov Front in June. In August, 4th Guards Corps was subordinated directly to the Front, and next took part in the Second Sinyavino Operation. The offensive was led by 8th Army, and as its penetration stalled the brigades of the Corps were fed in piecemeal to try, unsuccessfully, to revive the attack. By October 1 the remnants of the 32nd were back in Volkhov Front reserves, and then were reassigned to 2nd Reserve Army in the Reserve of the Supreme High Command for rebuilding. The brigade returned to the front in February 1943, briefly assigned to 53rd Army in Northwestern Front, before being moved to 22nd Army in the same Front, north of Vyasma. It was still in this Army in October when it became part of the cadre for the new 319th Rifle Division.

=== 33rd Rifle Brigade ===
This was a "sister" unit to the 32nd, and so shared most of its early history. The 32nd likely also shared the organization of the 33rd, which had several non-standard elements:

- 3 rifle battalions, each:
  - 3 rifle companies (9 LMGs in 3 rifle platoons)
  - 1 machine gun company (12 HMGs)
  - 1 mortar company (50mm and 82mm mortars)
- 1 mortar battalion (120mm mortars)
- 1 artillery battalion (8 45mm guns, 4 76mm cannon or 122mm howitzers)
- 1 tank battalion (9 medium, 3 light tanks)
- 1 antitank company (3 45mm guns, 40 antitank rifles)
- 1 reconnaissance company
- Signal, Supply and Chemical Defense companies

The artillery appears to be whatever was on hand in the Arkhangelsk District at the time. As for the tanks, when Soviet sources refer simply to "medium" or "light" this usually indicates Lend-Lease vehicles; in this time and place these would probably be British Matildas (medium) and Valentine (light) tanks.

The 33rd also fought with 4th Guards Rifle Corps in the Lyuban Operation and Second Sinyavino Operation. After suffering heavy losses in the latter the "sister" brigades were finally split up. The 33rd was sent to 3rd Reserve Army for rebuilding, and finally, in January 1943, all the way back to the training establishments of Moscow Military District. It returned to the front in February to the new 68th Army in Northwestern Front, then in the spring to 1st Shock Army in the same Front, near Staraya Russa. On October 1 it was moved to 22nd Army, still in Northwestern Front, to help form the cadre of the new 319th Rifle Division.

== Belorussian and Baltic Campaigns ==
The division's order of battle remained the same as the first two formations. The two rifle brigades were from different armies within the Front, but the 319th's divisional headquarters was formed in the 44th Rifle Corps of 22nd Army, before the brigades had been officially disbanded to provide the bulk of the troops for the new division. On October 10, most of the assets of this Front came under the headquarters of the disbanded Bryansk Front to become Baltic Front, renamed 2nd Baltic Front ten days later. The division would remain under these commands until late August 1944. Colonel Uralsky held his command until March 23, 1944. He was then succeeded over the next ten weeks by three other colonels, until on June 5 Col. Dmitrii Arsentevich Dulov took the reins, which he would hold for the duration of the war.

At the start of the Baltic Campaign in early July 1944, the 319th was holding a sector of the Alolya River, facing the German Panther Line defenses about 20km north of Pustoshka. On July 27, the division, while temporarily attached to 6th Guards Army, was recognized for its role in liberating the city of Dvinsk, and was given that name as an honorific:

"DVINSK" [DAUGAVPILS] - ...319th Rifle Division (Colonel Dulov, Dmitrii Arsentevich)... The troops who participated in the liberation of Daugavpils and Rezekne, by the order of the Supreme High Command of 27 July 1944 and a commendation in Moscow are given a salute of 20 artillery salvoes from 224 guns..

By August 1, the division was back with 22nd Army and had advanced north as far as Preiļi. Late that month the 319th, still in 44th Corps, was moved to 3rd Shock Army in 2nd Baltic Front, and in September to 2nd Guards Army in 1st Baltic Front. In early October it was east of Raseiniai in Lithuania at the start of the offensive that would result in the liberation of Riga and the formation of the Courland Pocket. In November the division was reassigned once again, now to 43rd Army, where it would remain for the duration.

== Into Germany ==
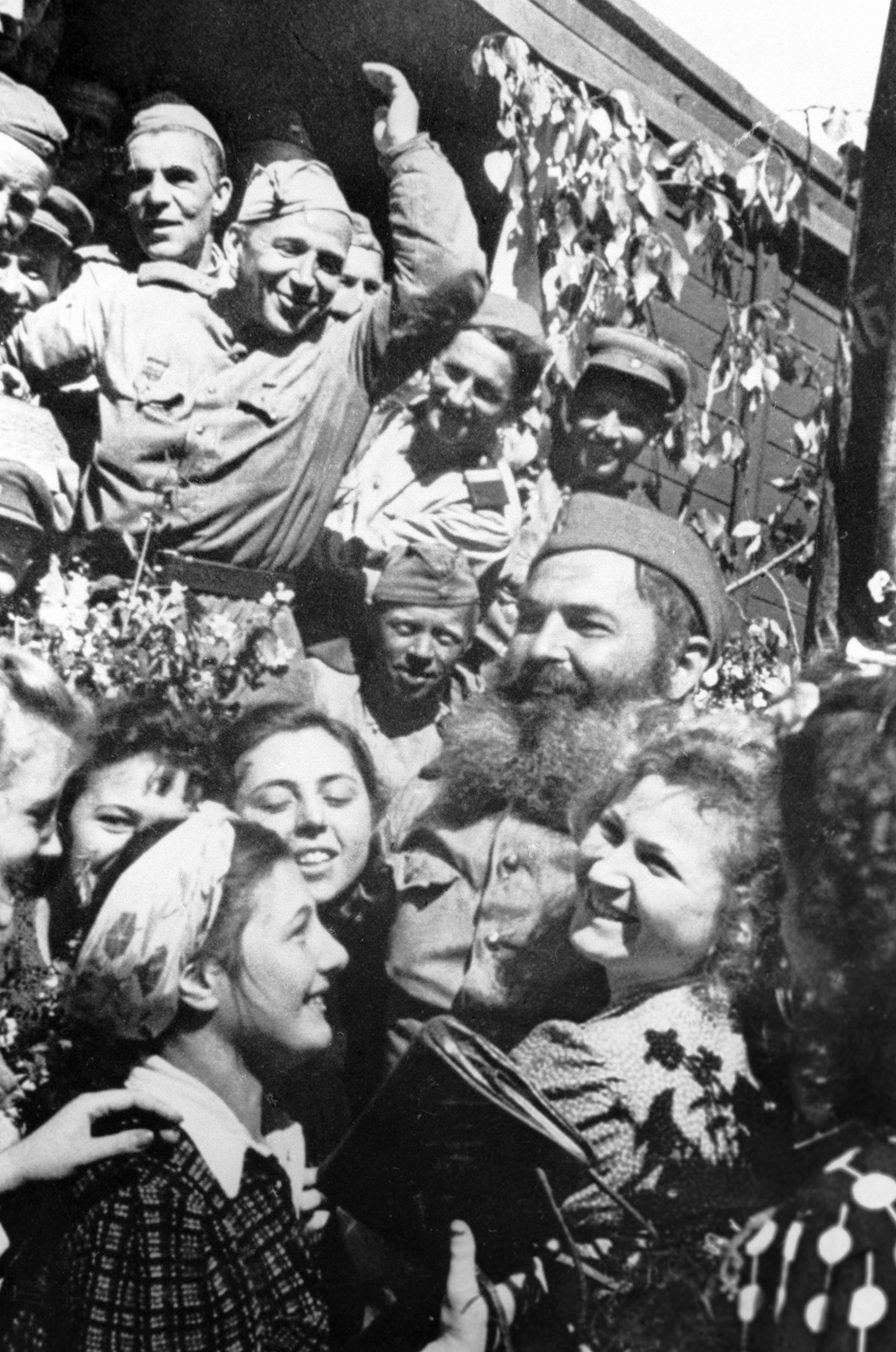
Former reconnaissance squad leader of the division's 434th Separate Destroyer Anti-Tank Battalion Private Aleksey Lisenkov being hugged after demobilization, Rzhevsky station, Moscow, July 1945

In early January, 43rd Army was on the left flank of 1st Baltic Front, near Memel. On January 19, 1945, 43rd Army became part of 3rd Belorussian Front and the 319th participated in the Vistula-Oder Offensive under these commands. By January 27 the 43rd was advancing along the south shore of the Kurisches Haff and had reached the outer defenses of Königsberg. From then until April 9 the division would be involved in the siege and eventual reduction of this fortified city. In the last month of the war the division was in 90th Rifle Corps, which formed the right flank of the 43rd Army in the final assault on Königsberg.

== Postwar ==
By the conclusion of hostilities, the division had been awarded the full title of 319th Rifle, Dvinsk, Red Banner Division (Russian: 319-я стрелковая Двинская Краснознамённая дивизия). The division became part of the Northern Group of Forces along with its corps, and was reorganized into the 21st Mechanized Division. The division was disbanded during August and September 1946, along with the corps headquarters.
