= 19th Guards Mechanized Brigade =

Belarusian Ground Forces formation

2nd Guards Mechanized Corps (1942–1945) 2nd Guards Mechanized Division (1945–1957) 19th Guards Tank Division (1957–1990s) 19th Guards Storage Base (?–2008) 19th Guards Mechanized Brigade (2008–present)
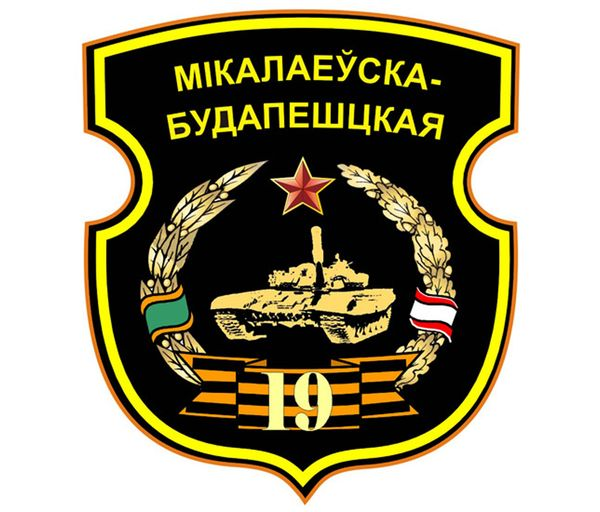
- Active: 1942–present
- Country: Soviet Union; Belarus
- Branch: Belarusian Ground Forces
- Type: Tank and Mechanized Infantry
- Role: Armored warfare
- Size: Division, Mechanized Corps, Brigade
- Garrison/HQ: Zaslonovo
- Engagements: World War II; Cold War

Commanders
- Notable commanders: Karp Sviridov

Key unit locations

The 19th Guards Mechanized Brigade is a formation of the Armed Forces of Belarus based in Zaslonovo, a few kilometers east of Lepiel. The brigade traces its history back to the 1942 formation of the 2nd Guards Mechanized Corps of the Soviet Army during World War II. Subsequent designations during the Cold War included 2nd Guards Mechanized Division and 19th Guards Tank Division. Following the Cold War, the 19th Guards Tank Division was relocated to Belarus and became part of their armed forces in 1992. Thereafter, the unit was reduced to a personnel and equipment cadre unit and titled the 19th Guards Base for Storage of Weapons and Equipment before being upgraded to a mechanized brigade in 2008.

== Second World War ==
Formed in the Tambov area on 15 October 1942 from elements of the 22nd Guards Rifle Division, the 2nd Guards Mechanized Corps was under the command of Major General Karp Sviridov and subordinated to the Southern Front and the 2nd Guards Army until late 1943, at which time the corps became a front-level asset and fought with the 2nd, 3rd, and 4th Ukrainian Fronts for the rest of the war. By the end of the war, the 2nd Guards Mechanized Corps commanded the 4th, 5th, and 6th Guards Mechanized Brigades, as well as the 37th Guards Tank Brigade. The corps fought at Stalingrad in 1942-43, at Melitopol in 1943, Odessa and Budapest in 1944, and Vienna in 1945. The 2nd Guards Mechanized Corps finished the war as part of the 6th Guards Tank Army in the area of Benešov, Czechoslovakia, on 9 May 1945.

== Cold War ==
The 2nd Guards Mechanized Corps, like all Soviet mechanized corps, was reorganized as a division in mid-late 1945, and was renamed the 2nd Guards Mechanized Division. The 2nd Guards Mechanized Division was part of the Southern Group of Forces based at Esztergom, Hungary. The division was part of the Soviet forces that crushed the Hungarian Revolution of 1956. On 15 December 1956, the division was reorganized as a tank division and renamed the 19th Guards Tank Division (Military Unit Number 16132). The 97th Motor Rifle Regiment transferred to the division from the 27th Mechanized Division on the same day. The division's 87th Guards Heavy Tank Regiment dropped the designation "Self-Propelled", also on the same day. The 67th Separate Tank Training Battalion was disbanded in 1960. In 1961 the 99th Separate Missile Battalion was activated. The 74th Separate Equipment Maintenance and Recovery Battalion was formed on 19 February 1962. The 87th Guards Heavy Tank Regiment became a regular tank regiment around this time. In 1968, the 55th Separate Sapper Battalion became an engineer-sapper battalion. The chemical defence company was upgraded to a battalion in 1972. The 1081st Separate Material Supply Battalion formed from the 690th Separate Motor Transport Battalion in 1980. The chemical defence battalion was once again downsized to a company in 1985. On 7 September 1987, the 99th Separate Missile Battalion became part of the 459th Missile Brigade. Among other veterans of the unit, Yuri Budanov served with the division in the late 1980s in Hungary.

The 87th Guards Tank Regiment, 99th Separate Guards Reconnaissance Battalion and 74th Separate Equipment Maintenance and Recovery Battalion disbanded in December 1989. They were replaced by the 130th Guards Tank Regiment, 56th Separate Reconnaissance Battalion and 77th Separate Equipment Maintenance and Recovery Battalion from the disbanded 13th Guards Tank Division. The division withdrew to Zaslonovo and became part of the 7th Tank Army.

== Post-Soviet service ==
Following the end of the Cold War, the unit was withdrawn to Zaslonovo in Belarus 1992 and then became part of the Armed Forces of Belarus. At some point following relocation, the division was reorganized and became a Base for Storage of Weapons and Equipment, a partial-strength mechanized infantry formation. "One of the equipment storage bases is the 19th, the former 19th Guards Tank Division at Zaslonovo in the Lepiel region. On October 1, 2003, the base was considerably strengthened. From other bases of storage of arms and techniques now we are distinguished favorably by new structure. Besides a battalion of protection, storage and service, motor-rifle and tank battalions were added."

In 2008, the base for storage of weapons and equipment was again upgraded into a brigade; 2012 reports suggest one-two established manoeuvre battalions.

== Sources ==
- V.I. Feskov et al., The Soviet Army in the period of the Cold War, Tomsk University Publishing House, 2004.
- Glantz, David, Colossus Reborn, University Press of Kansas, 2005.
- Poirier, Robert G., and Conner, Albert Z., The Red Army Order of Battle in the Great Patriotic War, Novato: Presidio Press, 1985.
- Ustinov, D. F. - Geschichte des Zweiten Welt Krieges (German translation of the Soviet official history, Volume 10), 1981
- https://web.archive.org/web/20130511201841/http://www8.brinkster.com/vad777/
