= 388th Rifle Division =

- Active: 1941–1946
- Country: Soviet Union
- Branch: Red Army
- Type: Division
- Role: Infantry
- Engagements: Siege of Sevastopol; Soviet invasion of Manchuria
- Battle honours: Harbin (2nd Formation)

Commanders
- Notable commanders: Aleksandr Dmitrievich Ovseenko; Kombrig Semyon Monakhov; Nikolai Aleksandrovich Shvarev; Nikolai Fedorovich Mulin

The 388th Rifle Division was raised in 1941 as an infantry division of the Red Army, and served twice during World War II in that role. The division followed a very similar combat path to that of the 386th Rifle Division in both of its formations. It was first formed on August 19, in the Transcaucasus Military District. From December 7 to 13, it was shipped from the Black Sea ports to Sevastopol, which was under siege by the German 11th Army.

The division arrived about a week before the second Axis assault on the fortress began and played an important role in the defense but suffered heavy casualties in the process. The battered unit remained in the fortress through the winter and spring until the final offensive, Operation Störfang, began on June 2, 1942. It continued the struggle, in much diminished strength, through to the final Axis victory and was finally stricken from the Red Army order of battle on August 5.

In the buildup to the Soviet invasion of Manchuria, a new 388th was formed in the Far Eastern Front in late 1944. The new division earned several distinctions as it fought its way into central Manchuria, including a battle honor, and continued to serve into the postwar era.

== 1st Formation ==
The 388th began forming on August 19, 1941, at Kutaisi in the Transcaucasus Military District. Its order of battle, based on the first wartime shtat (table of organization and equipment) for rifle divisions, was as follows:

- 773rd Rifle Regiment
- 778th Rifle Regiment
- 782nd Rifle Regiment
- 953rd Artillery Regiment
- 104th Antitank Battalion
- 181st Antiaircraft Battery (later 677th Antiaircraft Battalion)
- 675th Mortar Battalion
- 452nd Reconnaissance Company
- 671st Sapper Battalion
- 841st Signal Battalion
- 475th Medical/Sanitation Battalion
- 468th Chemical Protection (Anti-gas) Company
- 505th Motor Transport Company
- 240th Field Bakery
- 815th Divisional Veterinary Hospital
- 1448th Field Postal Station
- 719th Field Office of the State Bank

Col. Aleksandr Dmitrievich Ovseenko was assigned to command of the division on the day it formed, and he would remain in command until March 6, 1942. It continued forming under the military district headquarters into September and late that month was transferred to Transcaucasus Front. As of December 1 it was under command of the 46th Army. Beginning on December 7 it was shipped from several of the Transcaucasus Black Sea ports into Sevastopol to join the Soviet forces besieged there.

=== Siege of Sevastopol ===
On the night of December 7/8 the cruisers Krasnyi Kavkaz and Krasnyi Krym escorted a convoy of five transports carrying, among other men and supplies, 1,200 men of the 782nd Rifle Regiment, which had embarked at Poti. When its arrival was complete by December 15 the division added 11,197 personnel to the fortress garrison, along with artillery (18 76-millimeter regimental guns, 16 76-millimeter mountain guns, and eight 12-millimeter howitzers), 146 50-millimeter and 82-millimeter mortars, plus antitank guns. Personnel replacements and new weapons also arrived in this convoy, allowing the commander of Coastal Army, Maj. Gen. Ivan Petrov, to partly restore his existing forces in the front lines and retain the 388th as a central reserve, based at Inkerman.

The Eleventh Army launched its second assault on the fortress on December 17 with a short artillery barrage at 0610 hours to the surprise of the Soviet forces who were not expecting an attack during winter. While the assault struck all four of the Sevastopol defense sectors it soon became apparent that the main thrust was against Sectors III and IV, north and northeast of the port. The 40th Cavalry Division and the 773rd Rifle Regiment were sent to Sector IV, while the 778th moved to Sector III. The Sector IV commander, Maj. Gen. V. F. Vorobev, planned a counterattack before dawn on the 18th and had his coastal batteries and field artillery shell the German positions. However the Germans got their attack in first, hitting the 40th Cavalry and the 8th Naval Infantry Brigade. The 773rd was in an isolated position on the right flank of the 8th Brigade and came under attack around 0900 hours, first by aircraft and artillery and then by the 16th Infantry Regiment of 22nd Infantry Division, supported by assault guns, and was routed, falling back nearly 5 km and losing contact with the 241st Rifle Regiment of 95th Rifle Division on its right, which soon found itself surrounded. At dawn on December 19 the assault was resumed, particularly against Sector III, where the 778th Regiment held positions in the Kamyshly Ravine. The next day the Germans broke through at several points defended by the 40th Cavalry and the 773rd Regiment. At the end of the day General Petrov assigned the 778th and 782nd Regiments to Sector IV to bolster the 773rd.

The German attacks on December 21 were intended to complete the conquest of the fortress, but failed to do so. Again concentrating on sectors III and IV, they attacked Hill 192, overlooking the Kamyshly Ravine. This was contested by elements of the 778th and 782nd Regiments and the hill changed hands several times. The Germans had to bring in fresh troops and armor to finally recapture and hold the hill while the two regiments pulled back 1.5 km southwest of the village of Kamyshly. In this fighting the Soviet regiments suffered about 40 percent casualties. Overall, since December 17, the Sevastopol garrison had lost approximately 2,000 men killed and 6,000 wounded, while German casualties were also high. The next day the German 22nd, 24th and 132nd Infantry Divisions attacked on a 9 km front, driving a wedge between the 388th and the newly-arrived 79th Naval Rifle Brigade. A counterattack was launched towards Kamyshly and the gap was closed. Meanwhile, the 773rd Regiment, with the 40th Cavalry, maintained its positions north of the Belbek River in the face of heavy attacks. By this point General Petrov ordered the forces defending Sector IV to pull back to shorter lines. The 388th was moved back towards Inkerman to strengthen the defenses in the Black River valley. The German offensive resumed on December 24, but was concentrated mainly in the north. On December 26 the Soviet landings on the Kerch Peninsula began, diverting German forces from the siege, and the division saw little additional action before the German assault ended on December 31.

During the lull in operations during the winter and spring, on March 7, 1942, Kombrig Semyon Monakhov took over command of the division from Colonel Ovseenko. At about this time the overdue antiaircraft battalion of the division was lost at sea. During this period the 388th was concentrated in Defense Sector I, among landmarks familiar from the Crimean War. The First Turkish Redoubt on Canrobert Hill contained the command post of 1st Battalion, 782nd Regiment, which was shelled by German artillery on the night of May 23. Two days after this Kombrig Monakhov gave up his command; he would later command the 319th Rifle Division. His replacement, Col. Nikolai Aleksandrovich Shvarev, arrived from the 79th Naval Brigade on June 1, and would remain in command for the duration of the 1st formation.

The third and final assault began on June 7. In general the 388th was in reserve positions backing up the 109th Rifle Division, whose commander, Maj. Gen. P. G. Novikov, also led Defense Sector I. The 773rd and 778th Regiments were holding the area around the village of Kamary, while the 782nd had been redeployed to the Sapun Heights. On the first day part of the 782nd was attacked, but held. By June 10 German forces had driven a wedge into the Soviet lines in the area of the Mekenzievy Mountain railway station and the nearby barracks. The 778th was ordered north to take part in a counterattack that followed an artillery barrage at 0800 hours on June 11. What followed was savage fighting at about 50m range, but the Red Army forces were outnumbered two-to-one and unable to regain the ground.

On the same day the German XXX Army Corps began more active operations against Sector I. A two-battalion attack near Kamary gained a few hundred yards before being stopped by counterattacks from the 782nd Regiment. The village was held by two battalions of the 778th, which came under heavy artillery fire on June 12, causing significant losses, before being attacked from the east and south. General Novikov decided the regiment was in poor shape and ordered a relief-in-place overnight, but German troops detected the movement and the 778th didn't leave sufficient rearguards to cover the barbed wire and mines in front of the village. A surprise attack at 0430 hours on the 13th cleared the obstacle belts by 0700 while artillery fire disrupted the relief effort. Novikov's line was beginning to buckle. Late that afternoon the 401st Infantry Regiment was massed north of Kamary with armor support facing the veteran 602nd Rifle Regiment of 109th Division, which was soon overwhelmed and forced to fall back. This soon turned into a rout and by 1745 hours German forces reached the outskirts of Fort Kuppe, which contained the headquarters of both the 602nd and 782nd Regiments. By nightfall both the village and the fort had been captured and a huge salient had been driven into the center of Sector I's lines, while the flanks held firm. Over the next two days XXX Corps continued its advance, albeit at a slower pace, and on the 16th Novikov had no choice but to withdraw 1–1.5 km to a shorter line centered on Kadykovka. In the course of this fighting his forces lost about 6,000 men, including 1,800 captured, and the 388th was "virtually demolished". XXX Corps also incurred well over 5,000 casualties and went over to the defense on June 22.

On June 29 German troops landed on the south coast of Sevastopol Bay. In the area of the Suzdal Heights the remnants of the 9th Naval Rifle Brigade and the 388th and 109th Divisions held the last line east of the Chersonese. The division's remnants, the 773rd and 782nd Rifle Regiments and 953rd Artillery Regiment, took up positions to cover the last remaining airfield on June 30, holding their positions until finally surrendering on July 2. Colonel Shvarev was evacuated; he went on to command the 317th Rifle Division and the 20th Rifle Corps. On August 5 the 388th was finally stricken from the Red Army order of battle.

== 2nd Formation ==
After an absence of more than two years from the Red Army order of battle, much like the 384th Rifle Division, and the 386th, a new 388th was formed on November 22, 1944, as a separate rifle division of the 15th Army of the Far Eastern Front. It had an entirely different order of battle from the 1st formation:

- 499th Rifle Regiment
- 630th Rifle Regiment
- 632nd Rifle Regiment
- 869th Artillery Regiment
- 477th Self-Propelled Gun Battalion
- 430th Antitank Battalion
- 116th Reconnaissance Company
- 214th Sapper Battalion
- 1031st Signal Company
- 349th Medical/Sanitation Battalion
- 237th Chemical Protection (Anti-gas) Company
- 621st Motor Transport Company
- 601st Field Bakery
- 498th Divisional Veterinary Hospital
- 3154th Field Postal Station
- 1996th Field Office of the State Bank

Col. Nikolai Fedorovich Mulin was appointed to command on the day the division re-formed, and remained in command for the duration.

=== Soviet invasion of Manchuria ===
When this operation began on August 9, 1945, the 15th Army was assigned to 2nd Far Eastern Front. The Army had four rifle divisions under command, the 34th, 255th, 361st and 388th, and was operating on a front of more than 300 km, although its forces were concentrated in three limited sectors. The 388th was at Voskresenskoye, about 30 km east of Leninskoye, and was deployed to secure Japanese strongpoints on the south bank of the Amur River on the left flank of the 361st. These two divisions, plus the 34th, planned to unite at Chiamussu on the Songhua River.

At 0100 hours on August 9 reconnaissance and advanced detachment of all four divisions attacked without artillery preparation and secured major islands in the Amur. The 1st Battalion of the 630th Rifle Regiment, embarked in vessels of the 2nd Brigade of the Amur Flotilla, assaulted Japanese positions at Fuyuan, which were taken by 0730 hours. During the rest of the day, in the face of heavy rains and mud, the advance elements of 15th Army consolidated their positions on the islands and south bank while the main forces prepared for the main crossing operations. On August 10 the division secured Chienchingkou then moved southwest to join the 361st near Tungchiang. The two divisions then advanced south on the road to Fuchin, led by a forward detachment consisting of a rifle battalion mounted on tanks of the 171st Tank Brigade. Fuchin fell to the 361st on the 11th, after which the 171st Tanks led the Army's units towards Chiamussu. On August 16 the 632nd Regiment conducted an amphibious assault at this city. This force, in cooperation with the 1st and 2nd Brigades of the Amur Flotilla plus the tank brigade and the remainder of the two divisions, broke Japanese resistance, took the surrender of the Manchukuoan 7th Infantry Brigade and secured the city. The landing force of the 388th was officially recognized for its role in this victory.

After the fall of Chiamussu the forces of 15th Army pressed southward along the Songhua towards Sansing, while the 632nd Regiment remained embarked on the Amur Flotilla as an assault force. On August 19 Sansing was secured; by now news of the Japanese surrender was spreading and more prisoners were being processed. The Army's pursuit along the river until August 21 when a forward detachment aboard the Flotilla linked up with 1st Far Eastern Front at Harbin, after covering 700 km over 12 days. At the end of the campaign the division was recognized for its service with the battle honor "Harbin".
