= 257th Division =

257th Division may refer to:

- 257th Infantry Division, Wehrmacht, Germany
- 257th Rifle Division (July 1941 formation), Soviet Union
- 257th Rifle Division (November 1941 formation), Soviet Union
- 257th Rifle Division (July 1943 formation), Soviet Union

== See also ==
- List of military divisions by number
