= 1st Sevastopol Marine Regiment =

- Active: 1941–1942
- Disbanded: January 1942
- Country: Soviet Union
- Branch: Soviet Navy
- Type: Naval infantry
- Role: Coastal defense
- Size: Regiment
- Part of: Black Sea Fleet; Primorsky Army; 172nd Rifle Division
- Engagements: World War II

Commanders
- Notable commanders: Pavel Filippovich Gorpishchenko

The 1st Sevastopol Marine Regiment, also known as the 1st Sevastopol Naval Infantry Regiment, was an improvised naval infantry unit of the Soviet Armed Forces formed in the autumn of 1941 from sailors of the Black Sea Fleet. It fought during the early stages of the defense of Sevastopol in World War II. The regiment participated in repelling the first and second assaults on Sevastopol. In January 1942, it became the foundation for the formation of the 8th Naval Infantry Brigade of the Black Sea Fleet (second formation).

== Background ==
After the creation of the Odessa Defensive Region (ODR), the 1st and 2nd Black Sea Naval Infantry Regiments of the Odessa Naval Base were formed. In terms of personnel and armament, they were closer to battalions: one had 1,300 fighters, the other about 700. The 1st Black Sea Naval Infantry Regiment, commanded by Colonel Yakov Ivanovich Osipov, took up a defensive position on August 8, 1941, in the eastern sector near Hryhorivka, Buldynka, and Stara Dofinivka.

From September 3 to 10, 1941, the Odessa Rifle Division was formed, which later became the 421st Rifle Division. The 1st Naval Infantry Regiment became the 1330th Regiment, and the 26th NKVD Regiment became the 1331st Regiment. The division held the defense near Odessa between the Khadzhibey and Kuyalnik Estuaries.

In late November 1941, marines evacuated from Odessa became the foundation for the formation of the 109th Rifle Division. Its 381st Regiment was the former 1st Black Sea Naval Infantry Regiment, previously part of the disbanded 421st Rifle Division.

Since unit names in the Red Army were generally not used in the early war period, the 1st Black Sea Naval Infantry Regiment (1330th Regiment, later the 381st Regiment) and the 1st Sevastopol Marine Regiment are often confused in documents. However, there is no direct succession between them. Later, there was a similarly named 1st Marine Regiment of the Baltic Fleet.

The lineage of the 1st Sevastopol Marine Regiment is traced to the 1st Perekop Naval Infantry Detachment, or 1st Perekop Sailor Detachment (formed from the 1st Battalion of the 7th Naval Infantry Brigade commanded by Captain Georgy Filippovich Sonin). The survivors of this detachment became part of the 1st Battalion of the regiment.

== History ==
=== Formation ===
On November 9, 1941, the 1st Sevastopol Marine Regiment was formed within the Sevastopol Defensive Region (SDR). Its 1st Battalion was the 1st Perekop Naval Infantry Detachment. The 2nd Battalion consisted of a battalion from the Danube Military Flotilla and the 17th Machine Gun Company. The 3rd Battalion included personnel from the Black Sea Fleet Weaponry School and the Combined Training Battalion. The regiment's headquarters was formed from the disbanded 42nd Cavalry Division. The regiment's commander was Colonel Pavel Filippovich Gorpishchenko, former commander of the Weaponry School, and its commissar was Battalion Commissar P. A. Chapsky.

=== Under the Command of the 172nd Rifle Division ===
In battles on the Ishun defensive lines, the 172nd Rifle Division suffered heavy losses, with its regiments reduced to fewer than 300 men, and its artillery possessing only two 76-mm guns. The division had about 1,000 men upon reaching Sevastopol. However, additional reinforcements, including valuable specialists and part of the 1941 autumn draft, bolstered its ranks. The remnants of the division were reorganized into the 514th Rifle Regiment of two-battalion composition. The division was reinforced by the attachment of the 1st Sevastopol Marine Regiment (formed from the 1st Perekop Battalion, a battalion and the 17th Machine Gun Company of the Danube Flotilla, and a battalion from the Weaponry School) and the 2nd Black Sea Marine Regiment.

On November 10, 1941, the 31st Rifle Regiment was added to the division, which now defended an 18.5-kilometer sector of Sevastopol. During the second German assault in December 1941, the regiment played a key role in repelling the enemy.

On December 17, 1941, the enemy intensified attacks on the regiment's positions. The Germans managed to push back the 2nd Battalion (commanded by Captain A. G. Petrovsky, commissar Senior Political Instructor N. V. Rybakov) and partially captured their trenches. A hand-to-hand combat ensued, during which the commander was killed, and the commissar was severely wounded. The sector commander, Colonel N. A. Laskin, decided to restore the situation using the 7th Naval Infantry Brigade from his reserve. The brigade's battalions successfully counterattacked and regained lost positions.

In January 1942, after suffering significant losses, the regiment was reorganized.

=== Reformation into the 8th Naval Infantry Brigade ===
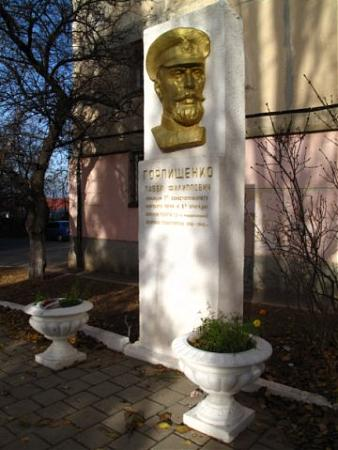
Monument to P. F. Gorpishchenko in Sevastopol, Gorpishchenko St., 47

After repelling the second assault on Sevastopol, Order No. 003 of the Black Sea Fleet Command on January 14, 1942, disbanded the almost entirely depleted 8th Naval Infantry Brigade (first formation). On January 29, 1942, Order No. 079 reformed the 8th Naval Infantry Brigade (second formation) based on the 1st Sevastopol Marine Regiment. Colonel P. F. Gorpishchenko became its new commander, and Battalion Commissar P. A. Chapsky became the commissar.

The regiment was in active service from November 9, 1941, to January 20, 1942.

== Legacy ==
The name of the regiment is inscribed on the Memorial of the 2nd Sector of Sevastopol's Defense. Architect: A. L. Sheffer. It was inaugurated on October 30, 1961.

The inscription reads: "2nd Sector of the Sevastopol Defensive Region, October 1941 – July 1942. Units that fought here: 172nd Rifle Division, 386th Rifle Division, 7th Naval Infantry Brigade, 1st Sevastopol Marine Regiment, 2nd Marine Regiment."
