= Galina Nikolaeva =

Russian writer (1911–1963)

Galina Nikolayeva
- Born: Galina Yevgenyevna Volyanskaya; February 18, 1911; Usmanka, Tomsky Uyezd, Tomsk Governorate, Russian Empire
- Died: October 18, 1963 (aged 52); Moscow, Soviet Union
- Awards: Stalin Prize; 2 Orders of the Red Banner of Labour

Galina Yevgenyevna Nikolayeva (Russian: Галина Евгеньевна Николаева; 18 February 1911 – 18 October 1963), maiden name Volyanskaya, was a Soviet writer. She was awarded the Stalin Prize in 1951 for her novel Harvest.

Harvest was translated and widely read in China, where it influenced China's socialist literature.
