= 18th Rifle Division =

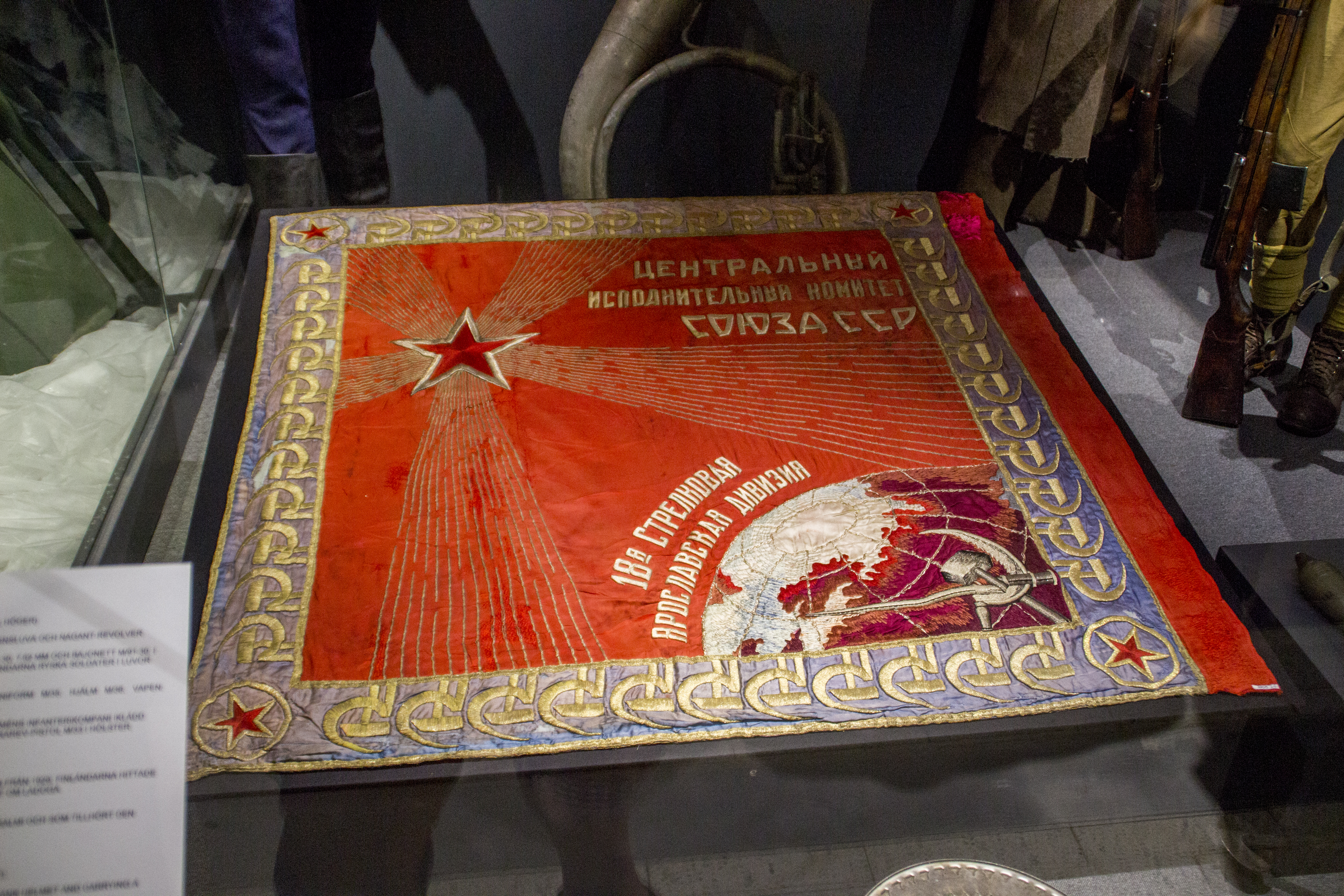
- Banner of the division
- Active: 1st Formation: 1918-1940 2nd Formation: 1940-1941; 3rd Formation: 1941-1942; 4th Formation: 1942-1946 5th Formation: 1955-1956
- Country: Soviet Union
- Allegiance: Red Army
- Type: Infantry
- Size: Division
- Engagements: Polish-Soviet War Winter War; World War II: Battle of Moscow; Battle of Stalingrad; Operation Iskra; Svir–Petrozavodsk Offensive; East Pomeranian Strategic Offensive Operation
- Decorations: Honorary Revolutionary Red Banner (1st formation); Order of the Red Banner (4th formation); Order of Suvorov (4th formation); Order of Kutuzov (4th formation)
- Battle honours: Mga (4th formation)

Commanders
- Notable commanders: Ieronim Uborevich

External image
- Карта боевого пути division

The 18th Rifle Division was an infantry division of the Soviet Union's Red Army during the Russian Civil War, Polish–Soviet War, Winter War and World War II. The division was formed a total of five times during this period.

== First Formation ==
The 18th Rifle Division was formed on 26 November 1918 at Arkhangelsk from troops from Archangel, Belsky and Kotlassky areas.

During the period from November 1918 to May 1921 the division was part of the 6th Army, 7th Army, 15th Army, 4th Army, Reserve Group of the Western Front, 3rd Army, 15th Army, 9th Army, and 11th Armies. It participated in the liberation of Archangel and Onega. In the spring of 1920 the division was part of the Western Front and took part in the invasion of Poland. After being defeated at the Battle of Warsaw the division retreated to East Prussia where it was briefly interned.

In November 1920 the division was assigned to the Caucasus Front where it participated in the battles with the white-green in the Kuban region and participated in the Erivan operation. In 1921 the division was located in Yaroslavl, Moscow Military District.

It was a territorial division after the end of the Russian Civil War until the late 1930s, when it was upgraded to cadre status and dispatched to Petrozavodsk, Leningrad Military District.

From 20 November 1939 to March 1940 the division was assigned to the 56th Rifle Corps, 8th Army (Soviet Union) during the Winter War, the division led the attack on Uomaa-Kitilä-Impilahti-Sortavala. The division was encircled near Lemetti and defeated. In early 1940 due to the loss of its banner and heavy losses the division was disbanded. The remains of the division were reassigned to the 71st Rifle Division.

Currently, the division banner as a trophy stored in museum collections in Finland.

=== Subordinate Units ===
The Russian Wikipedia article lists the following subordinate units:

- 97th Infantry Regiment
- 208th Infantry Regiment
- 316th Infantry Regiment
- 12th Howitzer Regiment
- 3rd Reconnaissance Battalion
- 381st Separate Tank Battalion

Armies of the Bear list the following subordinate units: This is likely the OB prior to the expansion of the Soviet Army and the reorganization of the regiments in early 1939

- 52nd Rifle Regiment
- 53rd Rifle Regiment
- 54th Rifle Regiment
- 18th Artillery Regiment

== Second Formation ==
It was established at Kazan on 15 August 1939 from the Ulyanovsk-based 86th Rifle Division as the 111th Rifle Division, and on 2 February 1940 (Russian Wiki), or April 1940 (Avanzini and Crofoot) was renamed as the 18th Rifle Division.

Until June 1941 was stationed in Kazan, from the middle of June 1941 to the beginning of the transfer of the western frontier. On 22 June 1941 the 208th Infantry Regiment and the majority of other regiments had arrived in the west. Still located in Kazan was the commander of the division, and all the rear units. The division was assigned to 61st Rifle Corps, 20th Army (Soviet Union). The division initially took up positions west of Orsha, but on 5 July was moved to south of Orsha taking up positions on the left bank of the Dnieper River covering the area from Orsha to near Shklow.

The corps ordered the division to push two battalions supported by antitank weapons to the Drut River 40–45 km from the main line of defense. These units were quickly cut off from the rest of the division by advancing German forces. The division fully entered battle on 9 July and by 11 July German forces had crossed the Dnieper River north of Shklow and quickly surrounded the division. The division received its order to withdraw on 18 July and on 19 July was in an encircled defensive position near Pishchikov. east of the Dnieper River. A small part of the division was able to break out of the ring on 23 July and joined the group led by General Boldin, which broke out of the encirclement on 15 August 1941.

For its actions defending the Dnieper River the division was awarded the Order of the Red Banner. The division was officially disbanded on 19 September 1941.

=== Subordinate Units ===
- 97th Rifle Regiment
- 208th Rifle Regiment
- 316th Rifle Regiment
- 3rd Artillery Regiment
- 12th Howitzer Artillery Regiment
- 64th Separate Antitank Artillery Battalion
- 356th Separate Antiaircraft Artillery Battalion
- 56th Reconnaissance Battalion
- 86th Sapper Battalion
- 97th Separate Signals Battalion
- 105th Medical Battalion
- 48th Decontamination Company
- 179th Auto-Transport Company (formally 72nd Auto-Transport Battalion)
- 24th Field Bakery
- 215th Field Postal Station
- 97th Field Cash Office of the State Bank

== Third Formation ==
It was reestablished in September 1941 from the 18th Division of the Moscow People's Militia. It then fought at the Battle of Moscow. Became 11th Guards Rifle Division in January 1942.

=== Subordinate Units ===
- 1306th Rifle Regiment (until 7 December 1941)
- 1308th Rifle Regiment (until 26 December 1941)
- 1310th Rifle Regiment (until 22 October 1941)
- 365th Rifle Division (from 24 October 1941) becomes 33rd Guards Rifle Regiment
- 518th Rifle Regiment (from 28 November 1941) becomes 40th Guards Rifle Regiment
- 282nd Rifle Regiment (from 13 December 1941) becomes 27th Guards Rifle Regiment (formally with the 19th Rifle Division)
- 978th Artillery Regiment becomes 30th Guards Artillery Regiment
- 702nd Separate Antiaircraft Artillery Battalion becomes 8th Guards Sep AA Artillery Battery (formally 146th Sep. AA Artillery Battery)
- 477th Reconnaissance Company becomes 9th Guards Reconnaissance Company
- 461st Sapper Battalion becomes 15th Guards Sapper Battalion
- 866th Separate Signals Battalion becomes 12th Sep. Signals Battalion
- 500th Medical Battalion becomes 381st Medical Battalion
- 344th Decontamination Company becomes 14th Guards Decontamination Company
- 312th Auto-Transport Company becomes 504th Auto-Transport Company (formally 17th Auto-Transport Company)
- 927th Field Postal Station
- 394th Field Cash Office of the State Bank

== Fourth Formation ==
Recreated in February 1942 at Ryazan in the Moscow Military District from a cadre of the 16th Sapper Brigade. Spent four months in the District and assigned to the 1st Reserve Army in STAVKA Reserves. The division was located under the Staling Front Reserves by 10 July and reassigned to the 4th Tank Army. The division participated in unsuccessful counterattack on 22 July 1942. From 3–12 August the division was involved in intense fighting in a small bend of the Don River north-west of Stalingrad. Sustaining heavy casualties on 15–16 August and making another unsuccessful counterattack on 17 August. Due to its significant losses the division was put in reserve on 23 September 1942.

After spending three months in the Moscow Military District rebuilding near Tambov the division was sent to the Volkhov Front before the end of the year and assigned to the 2nd Shock Army. In mid-January 1943 the division broke through the German encirclement, breaking the Siege of Leningrad and joining the forces of the Leningrad Front. The 18th Rifle Division is credited with capturing the first Tiger Tank.

The division would participate in the Svir-Petrozavodsk Offensive. In late September 1944 the division was assigned to the Soviet-Finish border southwest of Sortavala. The division was placed in the STAVKA reserves in mid-November 1944 assigned to the 19th Army's 132nd Rifle Corps.

Reassigned to the 2nd Belorussian Front along with its higher headquarters the division participated in the East Pomeranian Strategic Offensive Operation and fought at Danzig, Poland.

Major General Alexander Yakushov commanded the division from July 1945 to its disbandment. It was stationed on Bornholm after the end of the war with the corps, part of the 43rd Army in the Northern Group of Forces from June 1945, and was disbanded in June 1946 after the corps was withdrawn to Poland on 4 May 1946.

=== Subordinate Units ===
- 414th Rifle Regiment
- 419th Rifle Regiment
- 424th Rifle Regiment
- 1027th Artillery Regiment
- 7th Student Battalion
- 359th Separate Antitank Artillery Battalion
- 458th Separate Antiaircraft Artillery Battery (until 10 March 1943)
- 200th Machine Gun Battalion (from 14 December 1942 to 10 March 1943)
- 121st Reconnaissance Company
- 72nd Sapper Battalion
- 714th Separate Signals Battalion (formally 588th Sep. Signals Battalion, 140th Sep. Signals Company)
- 83rd Medical Battalion
- 26th Decontamination Company
- 526th Auto-Transport Company
- 370th Field Bakery
- 811th Veterinary Field Hospital
- 1826th Field Postal Station
- 1149th Field Cash Office of the State Bank

== 5th formation ==
In 1955, it was reformed from the 194th Rifle Division at Kirov in the Ural Military District with the 10th Rifle Corps. On 5 June 1956 it became the 43rd Mechanized Division. It was relocated to Chkalov (Orenburg). On 4 June 1957, the 43rd Mechanized Division became the 130th Motor Rifle Division at Chkalov. The division disbanded on 1 July 1959.

== Commanders ==
- A.N. Lengovsky - (26 Nov - 1 Dec 1918)
- J.P. Uborevich - (1 Dec 1918 - 29 Sep 1919)
- N.M. Bobrov - (30 Sep - 26 Nov 1919)
- Mikhail Filippovsky - (26 Nov - 23 Mar 1920)
- B.A. Burenin - (23 Mar - 25 Aug 1920)
- L.Y. Ugriumov - (10 Sep - 25 Dec 1920)
- A.G. Schirmacher - (25 Dec 1920 - 24 May 1921)
- Nikolai Klykov (March 1931 - March 1935)
- Mikhail Khozin (May 1935 - March 1937)
- Kombrig G.F. Kondrashov - (Mar 1939 - Mar 1940) Executed 29 Aug 1940.
- Colonel Alekseev (Mar 1940)
- Colonel Karp Sviridov - (Apr 1940 – 31 Aug 1941)
- Colonel P.K. Zhivalev - (26 Sep 1941 – 10 Nov 1941)
- Colonel P.N. Chernyshev - (11 Nov 1941 – 5 Jan 1942)
- Colonel I.F. Seregin - (28 Feb 1942 – 25 Aug 1942)
- Lieutenant Colonel P.D. Strebkov - (26 Aug 1942 – 20 Sep 1942)
- General-Major M.N. Ovchinnich - (21 Sep 1942 – 20 Nov 1943)
- General-Major M. Absalyamov - 21 Nov 1943 – 25 Aug 1944)
- Colonel P.V. Poluveshkin - (26 Aug 1944 – 11 May 1945)

== Sources ==
- Crofoot, Craig, Armies of the Bear, orbat.com, 2003
- Feskov, V.I.; Golikov, V.I.; Kalashnikov, K.A.; Slugin, S.A. (2013). Вооруженные силы СССР после Второй Мировой войны: от Красной Армии к Советской [The Armed Forces of the USSR after World War II: From the Red Army to the Soviet: Part 1 Land Forces] (in Russian). Tomsk: Scientific and Technical Literature Publishing. ISBN 9785895035306.
- Robert G. Poirier and Albert Z. Conner, The Red Army Order of Battle in the Great Patriotic War, Novato: Presidio Press, 1985. ISBN 0-89141-237-9.
- Sharp Charles, C., Soviet Order of Battle World War II, Vol. VIII, Red Legions, Soviet Rifle Division Formed Before June, 1941, George F. Nafziger, 1996.
- Sharp Charles, C., Soviet Order of Battle World War II, Vol. IX, Red Tide, Soviet Rifle Division Formed From Juneto December 1941, George F. Nafziger, 1996.
- Sharp Charles, C., Soviet Order of Battle World War II, Vol. X, Red Swarm, Soviet Rifle Division Formed From 1942 to 1946, George F. Nafziger, 1996.
- Tsapayev, D.A.; et al. (2014). Великая Отечественная: Комдивы. Военный биографический словарь [The Great Patriotic War: Division Commanders. Military Biographical Dictionary] (in Russian). Vol. 5. Moscow: Kuchkovo Pole. ISBN 978-5-9950-0457-8.
