= Maykovo, Tomsk Oblast =

Maykovo Майково
- Derevnya
- Interactive map of Maykovo
- Location of Maykovo Maykovo (Tomsk Oblast)
- Coordinates: 57°38′07″N 83°38′18″E
- Country: Russia
- Federal subject: Tomsk Oblast
- Administrative district: Molchanovsky District
- Founded: 1746

Population
  - Estimate (2021): 101 )
- Time zone: UTC+7 (MSK+4)
- Postal code: 636330
- OKTMO ID: 69640425121

Maykovo (Russian: Майково) is a derevnya in Molchanovsky District, Tomsk Oblast, Russia. The village is under the administration of the Molchanovsky Rural Settlement, and had a population of 101 according to the 2021 Russian census.

== History ==
According to local legend, the first resident of the village and its founder was Pimen Maykov, one of the original Russian settlers in Siberia. The village was founded in 1746 on the bank of the Nizhny Tatosh and Kaymas rivers, tributaries of the Ob river, and first named Nizhne-Maykovo. After Molchanovo, Mogochino and Ust-Chulyma, Maykovo was the fourth village established in the Molchanovsky District. The first settlers struggled in the taiga conditions to raise vegetable gardens and crops.

During World War I, when most able-bodied peasant men were mobilized into the army, many political exiles arrived in the village. Four to five political exiles resided with every family, and they outnumbered the locals. Among them were the Bolsheviks A. P. Dubelshtein, A. S. Basov, I. M. Dorofeyev, M. A. Veynberg, F. G. Bondarchuk, and T. V. Orlov, among others. The exiles tried to assist the locals in organizing a school and public creamery, but all their attempts were quickly stopped by the local authorities.

By 1920 Maykovo included 85 homesteads, whose inhabitants engaged in farming and fishing, and a creamery. That year, Soviet rule was established in the village, and a party cell began, numbering twelve Communists. In addition, a primary school was opened in an ordinary home funded by parents. Its first teacher was named Vashigor, although his full name is not mentioned in documents. Late that year, a typhus epidemic swept the village, in which 36 people died.

In 1922, the Maykovsky Selsoviet (rural council), with Maykovo as its center, was organized under Molchanovsky volost, which included the settlements of Konangino, Polyakovka, and Fyodorovka with a total population of 800. A Komsomol cell was established in Maykovo in January 1924.

According to the 1926 census, the village of Maykovo numbered 100 homesteads, with the majority of the population of 469 (242 women and 227 men) being Russian.

Historical population
Year	Pop.	±%
1926	469	—
2002	177	−62.3%
2008	178	+0.6%
2010	114	−36.0%
2012	138	+21.1%
2013	134	−2.9%
2014	131	−2.2%
2015	134	+2.3%
2021	101	−24.6%

During the 1930s, three kolkhozes were created on the territory of the Maykovo Selsoviet: Kulturny Zhivotnovod (Cultured Stockbreeder) at Maykovo, imeni XVIII partsyezda (Party Congress) at Konangino, and imeni Parizhskoy Kommuny (Paris Commune) at Fyodorovka. The chairman of the Maykovo kolkhoz was Grigory Dmitriyevich Kalichkin, and he was succeeded by Danchenko, S. Maykez, M. I. Shapkin and others. At the time a fir and commercial cooperative was opened in the village led by foreman M. P. Gorgovsky. In 1940 the cooperative produced 7.5 tons of fir oil. That summer a small fishing brigade was created to provide additional food to collective farmers engaged in field work. The kolkhoz also had an apiary with 70 beehives, and in some years the collective farmers received honey, up to 200 grams per workday.

The inhabitants of Maykovo did not escape the Great Purge. In 1937, selsoviet chairman K. M. Levitsky, I. S. Cherkashin and Litvinov were arrested. Dekulakization took place and a number of inhabitants were exiled. During World War II, 69 locals went to the front, of which 28 were killed. In the village women, old men, teenagers and children were left to work.

During the 1950s and 1960s, the village underwent several reorganizations, in which it was united and then split from other villages, as a result of which it began to decline.

== Notable people ==
- Aleksandr Maykov (1902–1977), army officer
