= 363rd Rifle Division =

363rd Rifle Division (August 1941 – March 17, 1942) 363rd Rifle Division (November 25, 1944 - 1946)
- Active: 1941–1946
- Country: Soviet Union
- Branch: Red Army
- Type: Division
- Role: Infantry
- Engagements: Battles of Rzhev; Sychyovka-Vyazma Offensive; Soviet invasion of Manchuria

Commanders
- Notable commanders: Col. Karp Sviridov; Col. Savva Dmitrievich Pechenenko

The 363rd Rifle Division formed in August 1941, as a standard Red Army rifle division, in the Sverdlovsk Oblast. It may be considered a "sister" division to the 361st Rifle Division. After forming, it was assigned to the 30th Army, and played a role in the near-encirclement of the German 9th Army around Rzhev in the winter counteroffensive of 1941-42. In recognition of its tactical successes it was reorganized as the 22nd Guards Rifle Division in March 1942. A new 363rd was formed in November 1944, in the far east of the USSR. It saw very limited action during the Soviet invasion of Manchuria in August 1945, primarily in a pursuit and exploitation role.

== 1st Formation ==
The division began forming in August 1941 in the Urals Military District in the Sverdlovsk Oblast. Its basic order of battle was as follows:

- 1205th Rifle Regiment
- 1207th Rifle Regiment
- 1209th Rifle Regiment
- 926th Artillery Regiment

Col. Karp Sviridov was not assigned to command of the division until September 25, but he would continue in command through the existence of this formation. It spent about three months in the Urals forming and training.

In December the division was assigned to the 30th Army, in Kalinin Front. Beginning on January 8, 1942, this Army took part in the Sychevka-Vyasma Offensive Operation, which was planned "to encircle, and then capture or destroy the enemy's entire Mozhaisk - Gzhatsk - Vyasma grouping", that is, what later became known as the Rzhev salient. 30th Army operated mostly north and northwest of Rzhev itself, and the 363rd advanced over 30km in early January, driving the German forces out of several villages and small towns in the area. The division was recognized for its achievements in this counteroffensive on March 17 when it became the 22nd Guards Rifle Division, the same day that the 361st became the 21st Guards.

== 2nd Formation ==
It was not until November 25, 1944, that a new 363rd was formed, this time in the 35th Army of the Far Eastern Front. It was under the command of Col. Savva Dmitrievich Pechenenko until at least September 3, 1945. Its order of battle was as follows:

- 395th Rifle Regiment
- 404th Rifle Regiment
- 488th Rifle Regiment
- 501st Artillery Regiment
- 187th Antitank Battalion
- 468th SU Battalion (13 SU-76s)
- 50th Sapper Battalion

The division spent its entire career in 35th Army. It is shown in the order of battle for January 1, is not present on February 1, but reappears as of March 1, remaining there until August. When the Soviet invasion of Manchuria began that month, 35th Army was in the 1st Far Eastern Front, attacking the Hutou Fortified Region. The 363rd played little role in attacking the fortifications, and it mostly served as a mobile pursuit force aided by its battalion of SU-76s.

Along with the 35th Army headquarters, it was disbanded in late September 1945 in accordance with the order that established the Primorsky Military District.
