= Mikhail Budenkov =

Soviet sniper (1919–1995)

- Михаил Иванович Буденков
- Born: 5 December 1919; Slavtsevo, RSFSR
- Died: 2 August 1995 (aged 75); Melenki, Vladimir Oblast, Russia
- Military career
- Allegiance: Soviet Union
- Branch: Red Army
- Service years: 1939–1945
- Rank: Senior lieutenant
- Conflicts: World War II
- Awards: Hero of the Soviet Union

Mikhail Ivanovich Budenkov (Russian: Михаил Иванович Буденков; 5 December 1919 – 2 August 1995) was a Soviet sniper in World War II. He was awarded the title Hero of the Soviet Union on 24 March 1945 for killing 413 Nazis. By the end of the war he had killed 437 Nazis, making him one of the best snipers of the war.

== Early life ==
Budenkov was born on 5 December 1919 to a Russian peasant family in Slavtsevo. After completing seven grades, he worked on a collective farm, then studied to become a ship mechanic. He worked on a ship that sailed on the Moscow Canal. He returned to his home village in 1939 to work as a tractor driver, but later that year he was drafted into the Red Army and stationed in Brest.

== World War II ==
As soon as the German invasion of the Soviet Union began, Budenkov fought on the frontlines as a sniper in the 84th Rifle Regiment. Initially, he was a part of the retreat towards Moscow, but in September 1942, he assumed command of a mortar crew and, in his spare time, began working as a sniper. In May 1942 he was wounded, but after he was released from the hospital in August 1942 he was assigned to the 59th Guards Rifle Regiment and was made commander of a mortar company. He hunted as a sniper in his free time, and killed 17 enemy soldiers this way before requesting a transfer to a rifle company in the same unit to fight as a sniper. He had killed over 200 enemy soldiers by mortar fire in the battles for Velikiye Luki.

He specialized as a sniper, but utilized a machine gun during an offensive. He was wounded again in June 1943, but recovered and returned to combat. By September 1943 he had killed 107 Nazis by sniper fire, and the end of December brought his kill count to 158. During a battle that month he replaced his company commander, leading an advance on a strategic height and holding it, repelling counterattacks and not retreating despite getting wounded again. By the end of the battle, only eight soldiers were left, all wounded. He later became the party organizer of his battalion, having become a member of the Communist Party in 1943. His accurate sniper fire killed enemy machine gun crews in the battles for the city of Madona, allowing the advance of Soviet troops.

His squad commander described him as a "born sniper", and on 25 March 1945 he was awarded the title Hero of the Soviet Union. He received his gold star on 19 May at a ceremony in the Kremlin, and on 24 June 1945 he marched in the famous Victory Day Parade on Red Square. (Note: This body count does not include the enemy soldiers he killed by mortar fire back when he was in command of the mortar company. Most sources say his final tally was 437 kills, but the numbers vary slightly among sources.)

Shortly before victory he was sent to a military-political school, but he did not graduate because he was demobilized in December 1945 with the rank of senior lieutenant.

== Later life ==
He worked as deputy director of the Lyakhovskaya Machine-Tractor Station, and in 1947 he graduated from party school in Vladimir and then in Ivanovo in 1951. He then moved to Melenki, where he worked at a flax mill. He died on 2 August 1995.

== Awards ==
- Hero of the Soviet Union (24 March 1945)
- Order of Lenin (24 March 1945)
- Order of the Red Banner (15 January 1945)
- Order of the Patriotic War 1st class (11 March 1985)
- Medal "For Courage" (11 March 1943)
