= 361st Rifle Division =

361st Rifle Division (August 1, 1941 – March 17, 1942) 361st Rifle Division (November 22, 1944 - 1946)
- Active: 1941–1946
- Country: Soviet Union
- Branch: Red Army
- Type: Division
- Role: Infantry
- Engagements: Battles of Rzhev; Sychyovka-Vyazma Offensive; Soviet invasion of Manchuria

Commanders
- Notable commanders: Col. Denis Vasilevich Mikhailov; Lt. Col. Arakel Karapetovich Oganezov

The 361st Rifle Division formed in August 1941, as a standard Red Army rifle division, at Ufa. It may be considered a "sister" division to the 363rd Rifle Division. After forming, it was assigned to the 39th Army, and played a major role in the near-encirclement of the German 9th Army around Rzhev in the winter counteroffensive of 1941-42. In recognition of its successes it was reorganized as the 21st Guards Rifle Division in March 1942. A new 361st was formed in November 1944, in the far east of the USSR. It saw action during the Soviet invasion of Manchuria in August 1945, staging several crossing operations of the Amur and Songhua Rivers during the first days of the offensive, in recognition of which one regiment was awarded the Order of the Red Banner.

== 1st Formation ==
The division began forming on August 1, 1941, in the Urals Military District at Ufa. Its basic order of battle was as follows:

- 1200th Rifle Regiment
- 1202nd Rifle Regiment
- 1204th Rifle Regiment
- 925th Artillery Regiment

Col. Denis Vasilevich Mikhailov was assigned to command of the division on the day it began forming, and he continued in command through the existence of this formation. While the division was not known officially as a Bashkiri national division, given that it was formed in the Bashkir ASSR in the southern Urals, it probably had a large percentage of Bashkirs in its ranks, which numbered about 11,500 by the end of September.

In November the division was assigned to the 39th Army, which was forming in the Arkhangelsk Military District. In the dying days of the German offensive on Moscow, the units of this Army were assigned to build defenses along the line of the Sheksna River. They later consolidated in the Torzhok area, and in late December the 39th was assigned to Kalinin Front. Beginning on January 8, 1942, this Army took part in the Sychevka-Vyasma Offensive Operation, which was planned "to encircle, and then capture or destroy the enemy's entire Mozhaisk - Gzhatsk - Vyasma grouping", that is, what later became known as the Rzhev salient. The 361st was one of the spearheads of this thrust behind the German lines, reaching a point almost 50km due south of Rzhev by January 15; only the Soviet cavalry units made a deeper advance during this period. The division was recognized for its achievements in this counteroffensive on March 17 when it became the 21st Guards Rifle Division.

== 2nd Formation ==
It was not until November 22, 1944, that a new 361st was formed, this time in the 15th Army of the Far Eastern Front; it was not officially "on the books" until December. It was under the command of Lt. Col. Arakel Karapetovich Oganezov until September 3, 1945. Its basic order of battle was as follows:

- 345th Rifle Regiment
- 355th Rifle Regiment
- 394th Rifle Regiment

Due to its planned role in the upcoming offensive against the Kwantung Army, the division may not have had an artillery regiment formed. Prior to the offensive, the division was deployed near Leninskoye. According to the plan, it would link up with the 34th and 388th Rifle Divisions at Chiamussu on the Songhua River following the crossings. When the offensive began on August 9, 1945, the 361st made an assault river crossing of the Amur (over 1,000 metres wide at this point) with support from the 1st Brigade of the Amur Flotilla of the Red Navy. The reconnaissance and advance detachment, attacking without artillery support and in a heavy rainstorm, secured Tartar Island early that day. On August 10, ships of the Flotilla with elements of the division embarked, approached Tungchiang. After a two-hour battle with a Japanese rearguard, the town was secured. It was then joined by the 388th. The two divisions, supported by the 171st Tank Brigade and a rifle battalion as a forward detachment, moved south on the road to Fuchin, with the Amur Flotilla providing artillery support. Fuchin fell in a coordinated assault, with Japanese and Manchukuan defenders either surrendering or fleeing south or east to the next fortified areas. These held out until August 13, when they surrendered. The 345th and 394th Rifle Regiments had been ordered to load a battalion each on board the ships for future landings to assist the ground forces. The advance southwest from Fuchin towards Chiamussu was difficult, owing to Japanese resistance, bad roads and bad weather. The resistance was broken in part by landings of the 394th Rifle Regiment near Huachuan on the east bank of the Songhua, 40km north of Chiamussu. Outflanked, the Japanese forces had no choice but to fall back to the city. For its role in these crossing operations, on September 14 the 394th Rifle Regiment was awarded the Order of the Red Banner.

The division was disbanded in early 1946, after being transferred to the Transbaikal-Amur Military District following the disbandment of the 15th Army headquarters.
