= 363rd =

363rd or 363d may refer to:

- 363d Expeditionary Operations Group, inactive United States Air Force unit
- 363d Bombardment Squadron or 19th Antisubmarine Squadron, inactive United States Air Force unit
- 363d Fighter Squadron or 164th Airlift Squadron, unit of the Ohio Air National Guard 179th Airlift Wing located at Mansfield Lahm Air National Guard Base, Ohio
- 363d Intelligence, Surveillance and Reconnaissance Wing 361st Intelligence, Surveillance and Reconnaissance Group
- 363rd Volksgrenadier Division (Wehrmacht), a volksgrenadier division of the Heer (German Army) during the Second World War

== See also ==
- 363 (number)
- 363, the year 363 (CCCLXIII) of the Julian calendar
- 363 BC
