= Semyon Monakhov =

Soviet Army major general

Semyon Filippovich Monakhov
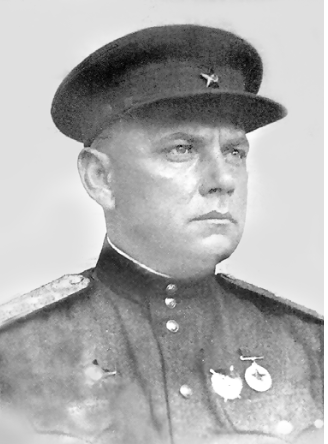
- Monakhov, c. 1945
- Born: 13 February 1900; Semyonovo, Moscow Governorate, Russian Empire
- Died: November 1959 (aged 59) Rostov-on-Don, Soviet Union
- Allegiance: Soviet Union
- Branch: Red Army
- Service years: 1918–1955
- Rank: Major general
- Commands: 80th Rifle Division; 135th Rifle Division; 388th Rifle Division; 319th Rifle Division; 257th Rifle Division
- Conflicts: Russian Civil War; Polish–Soviet War; World War II
- Awards: Order of Lenin

Semyon Filippovich Monakhov (Russian: Семен Филиппович Монахов; 13 February 1900 – November 1959) was a Soviet Army major general who held brigade and divisional commands during World War II.

A veteran of the Russian Civil War, Monakhov rose to senior posts in the interwar Red Army and commanded the Eastern Sector of the defense of Odessa in August 1941. He commanded the 388th Rifle Division in the Siege of Sevastopol before leading the 319th Rifle Division in the Battle of the Caucasus. Under investigation for accusations of cowardice between late 1942 and early 1943, Monakhov was acquitted and given command of the 257th Rifle Division in the summer of 1943. His tenure in command of the division proved brief as in September he was transferred to command a replacement unit, with which he spent the rest of the war. Postwar, Monakhov ended his career as a military adviser in the mid-1950s.

== Early life and Russian Civil War ==
Semyon Filippovich Monakhov was born on 13 February 1900 in the village of Semyonkovo, Ruzsky Uyezd, Moscow Governorate. During the Russian Civil War, he joined the Red Army on 15 October 1918, serving as a Red Army man in the 45th Workers' Reserve Regiment in Moscow. Sent to the 3rd Moscow Infantry Command Courses for command training, Monakhov departed with them to Uralsk in early March 1919, from where the courses were sent to the Eastern Front to fight against the White Ural Army in April.

After the White offensive in Siberia was defeated, the courses were transferred to Cherkassy and renamed the 11th Cherkassy Infantry Courses. With the courses, Monakhov took part in the elimination of the Ukrainian nationalist forces of the Green Ataman and Lopatin. That fall, the courses fought as part of the Kiev Cadet Brigade against the White Armed Forces of South Russia on the Southern Front, then were shifted to the Petrograd Front to confront the advance of the White Northwestern Army.

After the end of the fighting, the courses were transferred to Petrograd and renamed the 5th Petrograd Infantry Courses, then moved to Poltava in March 1920, being renamed the 29th Poltava Infantry Courses. Monakhov graduated from the courses on 1 October and was posted to the 7th Rifle Regiment of the 3rd Kiev Cadet Brigade as a machine gun platoon commander. In this position, he took part in the fighting near Kiev in the final stages of the Polish–Soviet War. After the end of hostilities in the latter, the brigade was dispatched to the Southern Front to take part in the operations against the White Army of Wrangel in Crimea and expanded into the 1st Consolidated Cadet Division. After the end of the fighting in Crimea, Monakhov took part in the suppression of Makhno's anarchists.

== Interwar period ==
The courses returned to Poltava and were renamed the 14th Poltava Infantry School in February 1921, with Monakhov appointed commander of a class year. In July 1921 he was sent to the Higher Rifle-Tactical School for Command Personnel for advanced training. After graduation, he commanded a separate company of the Forces of Special Purpose of the Ukrainian Military District from August 1922, and three months later was posted to the 68th Rifle Regiment of the 23rd Rifle Division. With the regiment, he served as an assistant platoon commander, platoon commander, company commander and assistant battalion commander.

Monakhov was transferred to serve as head of the military department of the Kharkov Geodesic Institute in October 1928, and in October 1931 became chief of the military training section of the Ukrainian Communist University. He returned to military schools in May 1933 as a tactics instructor of the Kharkov School for Red Starshinas. Monakhov was transferred to the headquarters of the Kharkov Military District in December 1937, serving as chief of the 2nd Department. In May 1939 he was appointed chief of a specialist group for special assignments directly responsible to the district Military Council. That month he rose to command the 80th Rifle Division, and in December shifted to command the 135th Rifle Division. Monakhov was transferred to the Odessa Military District headquarters in April 1940 to serve as chief of the Pre-Conscription and Basic Training Department. When the Red Army introduced general officer ranks on 4 June 1940, Monakhov was not recommended for major general and remained a kombrig. In September he became senior assistant inspector of the infantry, before being appointed chief of the district Combat Training Department in April 1941.

== World War II ==
After Germany invaded the Soviet Union, the Separate Coastal Army was formed in the district, and Monakhov appointed chief of its Combat Training Department in August. Being in this position, during the fighting on the approaches to Odessa in early August, he was picked to lead an improvised group scraped together from all available reserves, tasked with plugging the gap created by the retreat of the 30th Rifle Division in the region between the Kuyalnik and Tiligul estuaries, covering the eastern sector of the city defenses. The group was initially designated a Consolidated Detachment and was later renamed Group Monakhov. It included the 1st Naval Regiment, formed from the sailors of the Odessa Naval Base, the 26th Regiment of NKVD Border Guards, and the 54th Rifle Regiment of the 25th Rifle Division. As the group moved forward to the Tiligul estuary, the army command on 9 August ordered it to retreat to the Adzhalyk estuary and hold the line running through Koblevo, Vizirka, and Ilyinka. On 10 August Monakhov's detachment fought to the left of the 95th Rifle Division, on the line of Buyalyk, Pavlinka and Marinovka. The weakened 90th Rifle Regiment from the 95th Rifle Division and the remnants of the 11th Destroyer Battalion were transferred to Monakhov's detachment by the end of the day. These measures failed to prevent the army's right from being easily bypassed by the advancing Romanian troops. Monakhov's detachment was forced to retreat on the night of 11 August after its right was exposed by the retreat of Petrov's Cavalry Division, and consolidated on the line between Kuyalnik and Adzhalyk estuaries. Although Monakhov's group was weaker than the Western and Southern Sectors of the defense, its naturally strong position relying on the estuaries furthered its defense.

The Romanian offensive resumed on the morning of 22 August, striking towards Ilyinka on the right flank of the Eastern Sector. As the Romanian 15th Infantry Division attacked, the 1st Naval Regiment and 26th Regiment of NKVD Border Guards responded with their own attacks on the left flank of the sector. The 1st Naval Regiment was forced back to Shitsli, and Monakhov was forced to commit the 249th Convoy Battalion and 150th Signal Battalion to hold the village. At the same time Romanian attack on the right took one of the dominating heights over Ilyinka, forcing Monakhov to commit reinforcements in that sector. Fighting ranged for Ilyinka through the night and into 23 August, drawing in all of Monakhov's reserves.

As a result, when another Romanian attack struck at the junction of the 54th Rifle and 1st Naval Regiments on 23 August, it broke through and began to flank the 412th Coast Defense Battery. Monakhov reported to Odessa Defense Region commander Gavriil Zhukov about the critical situation in the region of the 412th Battery, but the defense region had no reserves left. Zhukov threw miners from replacement companies into battle, who, lacking rifles, fought with grenades, entrenching shovels and knives. They suffered heavy losses and on the next day another consolidated detachment gathered from the naval base, less than a third of its personnel armed with rifles, was dispatched to reinforce Monakhov. These desperate measures failed to restore the situation.

The Romanian advance continued on 24 August, pushing back Monakhov's overstretched troops, who began a general retreat along the entire Eastern Sector. The Romanian gains threatened a breakthrough to the port and city itself. To consolidate the defensive lines Zhukov made the decision to abandon Chebanka and blow up the guns of the 412th Battery, allowing Romanian artillery to move within range of the city. In the following days the Romanian troops continued to attack but were unable to break through.

After the 421st Rifle Division was formed drawing on reinforcements arriving by sea and the units of Group Monakhov transferred to the new division, Monakhov was shifted to the post of chief of the city defenses and garrison on 30 August, swapping positions with Colonel Grigory Kochenov, who was selected to command the new division. Zhukov rejected the suggestion of retaining Monakhov in command for the 421st. In October he was evacuated together with the army to Crimea and took part in the defense of Sevastopol. For his performance in the Defense of Odessa, Monakhov was awarded the Order of the Red Star on 10 February 1942.

From 7 March to 25 May Monakhov commanded the army's 388th Rifle Division, which took part in sustained fighting southeast of Sevastopol at Kadykovka and Kamara and fortified the defensive lines of the 1st Defense Sector of the city. Subsequently, he was appointed chief of the Combat Training Department of the North Caucasus Front.

In late July, Monakhov was sent to the North Caucasus Military District and on 4 August appointed commander of the new 319th Rifle Division, forming at Nalchik. The division was assigned to the Transcaucasus Front on 25 August, and on 12 September to the 58th Army of the front's Northern Group of Forces. The division was relocated by rail to the Grozny region from 23 September and took defenses east of the city. In the following months, Monakhov led the 319th in the Modzok–Malgobek and Nalchik–Ordzhonikidze Defensive Operations. In early November, accused of failure to carry out orders, Monakhov was relieved of command and prosecuted. He was imprisoned under NKVD investigation until February 1943, charged with displaying cowardice in a 5 November 1942 incident where he was accused of relocating the division command post to the rear of the corps command post without authorization and thus losing control of his units between 17:00 on 5 November and the morning of 6 November. The investigation found that Monakhov reported the change of his command post to 11th Guards Rifle Corps commander Ivan Rosly and 9th Army deputy commander Aleksey Selivanov, and unsuccessful operations were blamed on Monakhov's chief of staff. Monakhov was acquitted by the front Military Tribunal on 20 February.

Monakhov took command of the 62nd Naval Rifle Brigade on 10 March, and received the rank of major general on 31 March. In early July, in the region of the stanitsas of Sheptalskaya and Krymskaya, Monakhov's brigade and the 60th Rifle Brigade were combined to form the 257th Rifle Division, designated the 1st Rifle Division before 6 July. Monakhov was appointed commander of the new division, which was assigned to the 56th Army of the North Caucasus Front, defending positions in the Krymskaya region. From late July its units engaged in fighting in the Moldovanskaya region, tasked with diverting enemy forces to the Kuban sector of the front and not allowing their relocation to other sectors. The division was relocated to the region of the stanitsas of Dolzhansakya and Semeykino between 24 and 29 August and shifted to the 51st Army.

Several days later, Monakhov was appointed commander of the 28th Reserve Rifle Brigade, a replacement unit, on 2 September. The brigade was reorganized as the 28th Reserve Rifle Division in May 1944 and Monakhov continued to command it for the rest of the war.

== Postwar ==
After the end of the war, Monakhov's division was disbanded in October 1945 and he was placed at the disposal of the Don Military District Military Council to await further assignment. He was appointed chief of the district Combat and Physical Training Department in January 1946, and in March became chief of the Directorate and inspector of Combat and Physical Training of the North Caucasus Military District. After completing the Higher Academic Courses at the Voroshilov Higher Military Academy between May 1949 and July 1950, Monakhov was dispatched to serve as senior military adviser to the commander of a military district of the Czechoslovak People's Army. Returning to the Soviet Union, he was transferred to the reserve on 8 February 1955. Monakhov died in Rostov-on-Don in November 1959.

== Awards ==
Monakhov was a recipient of the following decorations:

- Order of Lenin
- Order of the Red Banner (3)
- Order of the Red Star
