= Karp Sviridov =

Soviet Army lieutenant general (1896–1967)

Karp Vasilyevich Sviridov
- Born: 24 May 1896; Chiganak, Makarovskoy volost, Balashovsky Uyezd, Saratov Governorate, Russian Empire
- Died: 4 February 1967 (aged 70); Kiev, Soviet Union
- Burial place: Baikove Cemetery
- Military career
- Allegiance: Russian Empire; Russian SFSR; Soviet Union
- Branch: Imperial Russian Army; Red Army (later Soviet Army)
- Service years: 1915–1918; 1918–1955
- Rank: Lieutenant general
- Commands: 18th Rifle Division (former 111th); 363rd Rifle Division; 22nd Guards Rifle Division (became 2nd Guards Mechanized Corps); 2nd Guards Mechanized Corps (became 2nd Guards Mechanized Division); 13th Rifle Corps; 1st Guards Rifle Corps
- Conflicts: World War I; Russian Civil War; World War II
- Awards: Hero of the Soviet Union; Order of Lenin (2); Order of the Red Banner (3); Order of Kutuzov, 1st class; Order of Suvorov, 2nd class

Karp Vasilyevich Sviridov (Russian: Карп Васильевич Свиридов; 24 May 1896 – 4 February 1967) was a Soviet Army lieutenant general and a Hero of the Soviet Union.

Drafted into the Imperial Russian Army during World War I, Sviridov briefly saw combat in 1917 and was demobilized in early 1918. Drafted into the Red Army during the Russian Civil War, he fought as a section commander on the Southern and Eastern Fronts, escaping from Volunteer Army captivity. Sviridov served in staff and command positions during the interwar period and by the beginning of Operation Barbarossa commanded the 18th Rifle Division.

His division was mostly destroyed in encirclement during the Battle of Smolensk, but Sviridov managed to break out and received command of the 363rd Rifle Division, which became the 22nd Guards Rifle Division in early 1942 for its actions in the Battles of Rzhev. In late 1942, the division was converted into the 2nd Guards Mechanized Corps, which Sviridov led for the rest of the war and the early postwar period. He was made a Hero of the Soviet Union for his leadership of the corps in the Siege of Budapest and the Vienna Offensive.

Postwar, Sviridov continued his military service, successively commanding two rifle corps and serving as deputy commander and assistant commander of several armies before retiring in 1955.

== Early life, World War I, and Russian Civil War ==
Sviridov was born on 24 May 1896, in Chiganak, Makarovskoy volost, Balashovsky Uyezd, Saratov Governorate, to a peasant family. During World War I, Sviridov was called up for military service in the Imperial Russian Army on 1 August 1915 and sent to a reserve rifle regiment in Zlatoust. After graduating from the regimental training detachment in October 1916, he served with it as a junior unter-ofitser and squad leader. Sent to the front with a marching company in April 1917, Sviridov fought with the 745th Novo-Alexandrovsk Infantry Regiment on the Western Dvina. Before his demobilization in April 1918, he was elected a member of the regimental committee.

During the Russian Civil War, on 15 September, Sviridov was drafted into the Red Army and assigned to the 2nd Rifle Regiment. As a Red Army man and section commander, he fought with the regiment on the Southern Front near Balashov. Near the khutor of Lukoyanovsky, Don Host Oblast, he was captured by the Volunteer Army in October 1918 and imprisoned. After escaping on 15 February 1919, Sviridov returned to the Red Army in March and joined the 8th Rifle Regiment of the 2nd Red Communards Brigade, forming in Samara. After the regiment was sent to the Ural Front, he served as section leader and assistant platoon commander in the fight against the Ural Cossacks. After the Ural Front was abolished in March 1920, Sviridov was transferred to work in the Revolutionary Tribunal of the Ural Fortified Region.

== Interwar period ==
From December, Sviridov studied at the 1st Moscow Machine Gun Courses, which became the 1st VTsIK Combined Military School. After graduating from the latter in November 1923, he was assigned to the 94th Red Banner Rifle Regiment of the 32nd Rifle Division in Saratov, successively serving as an assistant platoon commander and platoon commander, assistant rifle company commander, machine gun company commander, and head of the regimental school for the next several years. Transferred to the 34th Rifle Division in Syzran to serve as chief of staff of its 101st Rifle Regiment in March 1931, Sviridov became head of the 1st (operational) section of the staff of the 82nd Rifle Division in Perm in March 1932. Appointed commander of the 182nd Rifle Regiment of the 61st Rifle Division in Kamyshin in May 1933, he served as temporary head of the department of reservist training of the Volga Military District from December 1937, and from November 1938 was acting head of the 2nd staff department of the Volga Military District. Sviridov became assistant commander of the 86th Rifle Division in Kazan in February 1939, and in August was transferred to the Arkhangelsk Military District to command the 111th Rifle Division, which was renumbered as the 18th in February 1940. After entering the Higher Commanders' Improvement Courses at the Frunze Military Academy in October, he graduated in May 1941, returning to command of the 18th Division. The latter began relocating to Zhitomir in the Kiev Special Military District on 12 June.

== World War II ==
After Operation Barbarossa, the German invasion of the Soviet Union, began on 22 June, the trains carrying the division were rerouted to the Western Front in the Orsha area, where after unloading, it joined the 20th Army. Sviridov was appointed head of the Orsha Military Sector on the eastern bank of the Dnieper on 29 June. Entering battle with the German 18th Infantry Division on 6 July, the division repulsed German attempts to cross the river until 18 July. On 12 July, German troops broke through the defensive line in a neighboring sector and captured Smolensk four days later, surrounding part of the division. After making contact with the 19th Army headquarters, the division broke through and rejoined the army. Following the breakout, Sviridov was treated in a hospital for one and a half months, taking command of the 363rd Rifle Division, forming at Kamyshlov in the Ural Military District, during September. From 18 November, the 363rd was sent to the Kalinin Front to join the 30th Army, operating on the Rzhev direction during the Kalinin Defensive operation. During the same month, the division was transferred to the Western Front and fought in the Klin–Solnechnogorsk and Rzhev–Vyazma Offensives. For its "successful completion of command tasks" in the offensives, the division was renamed the 22nd Guards Rifle Division on 22 March 1942, while Sviridov received the Order of the Red Banner. The 22nd Guards was withdrawn to the Reserve of the Supreme High Command in April and May, then sent to the Northwestern Front's 53rd Army and fought with it until November against the German 16th Army holding the Demyansk bridgehead. Sviridov was promoted to major general on 1 October. By 6 November 1942, the division was relocated to Morshansk, where it reorganized as the 2nd Guards Mechanized Corps under his command.

The corps fought on the Stalingrad and Southern Front. In December, Sviridov "skillfully commanded" the corps during the attack against German forces around Kotelnikovo and Tormosin, then with other front units helped recapture Novocherkassk and Rostov-on-Don. He was promoted to lieutenant general on 7 June 1943. From August 1943, the corps fought in the Donbass, Melitopol, Bereznegovatoye–Snigeryovka, and Odessa Offensives, during which it recaptured Volnovakha, Kakhovka, and Berislav. For its "courage" in the recapture of Nikolayev, the corps received the name of the city as an honorific, and Sviridov was awarded the Order of Kutuzov, 1st class. The corps went on to fight in the advance into Hungary, Austria, and Czechoslovakia. In conjunction with the 46th Army of the 2nd Ukrainian Front, the corps helped capture Budapest, Tata, Nesmey, Győr, Vienna, and Brno. For its "courage" in the Siege of Budapest the 2nd Guards Mechanized received the name of the city as an honorific. For his "skillful organization and command of corps units and personal courage", Sviridov was made a Hero of the Soviet Union and awarded the Order of Lenin on 23 April 1945.

== Postwar ==
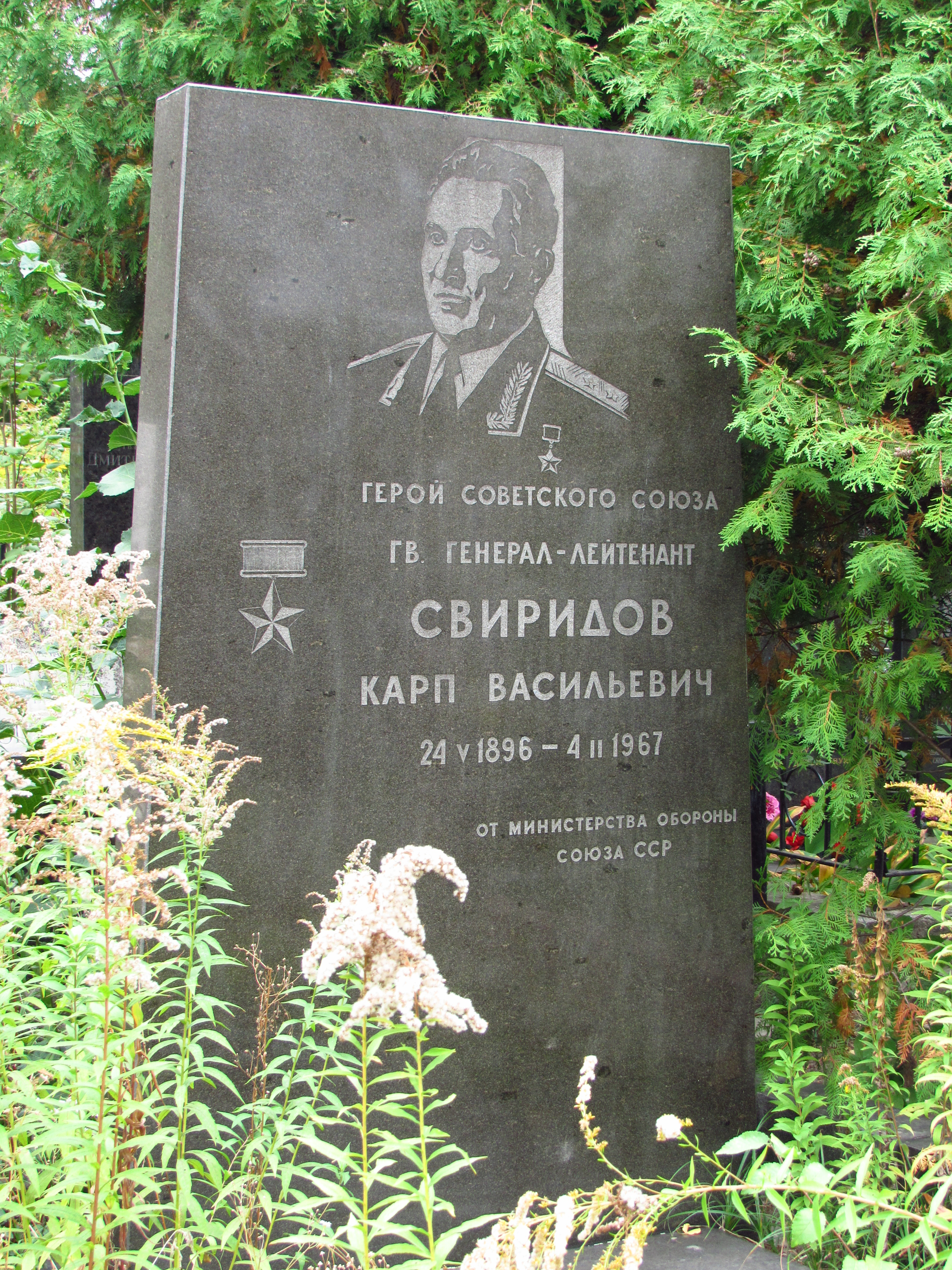
Sviridov's grave marker at the Baikove Cemetery

Sviridov continued in command of the corps, which became the 2nd Guards Mechanized Division of the Southern Group of Forces during November 1945, during the early postwar period. Entering Higher Academic Courses at the Voroshilov Higher Military Academy in March 1946, upon graduation a year later he was appointed assistant commander for personnel of the 2nd Guards Mechanized Army in the Group of Soviet Occupation Forces in Germany. From April 1949 he served as temporary deputy commander of the 5th Guards Mechanized Army in the Belorussian Military District at Bobruisk. From July of that year he commanded the 13th Rifle Corps of the Transcaucasian Military District, and in January 1951 transferred to the Moscow Military District to command the 1st Guards Rifle Corps. Placed at the disposal of the Main Personnel Directorate of the Soviet Army in October 1952, Sviridov was appointed assistant commander of the 6th Guards Mechanized Army in the Transbaikal Military District during January 1953; the position became assistant army commander and head of the army combat training department in November 1954. After retiring on 17 December 1955, Sviridov lived in Kiev, where he died on 4 February 1967, aged 70. He was buried in the city's Baikove Cemetery.

== Awards and honors ==
Sviridov received the following awards:

- Hero of the Soviet Union
- Order of Lenin (2)
- Order of the Red Banner (3)
- Order of Kutuzov, 1st class
- Order of Suvorov, 2nd class
- Medals
- Foreign orders
