= 257th Rifle Division (July 1943 formation) =

- Active: July 1943–December 1945
- Country: Soviet Union
- Branch: Red Army
- Type: Infantry
- Engagements: Donbass Offensive; Melitopol Offensive; Crimean Offensive; Šiauliai Offensive; Baltic Offensive; Memel Offensive; Courland Pocket
- Decorations: Order of the Red Banner; Order of Suvorov
- Honorifics: Sivash

Commanders
- Notable commanders: Aleksandr Maykov

The 257th Rifle Division (Russian: 257-я стрелковая дивизия) was an infantry division of the Red Army, the third unit to bear the designation during World War II.

== History ==
The 257th Rifle Division, the third unit to bear the designation during World War II, was formed in accordance with a 1 July 1943 order of the North Caucasus Front from the 62nd Red Banner Naval Rifle Brigade and 60th Red Banner Rifle Brigade. 62nd Naval Rifle Brigade commander Major General Semyon Monakhov continued to command the new division, and Lieutenant Colonel Aleksandr Maykov was appointed deputy commander. The new division inherited its Order of the Red Banner from both brigades. Before 6 July, the division was designated the 1st Rifle Division, and formed between 1 and 10 July in the region of the stanitsa of Sheptalskaya, six kilometers southeast of Krymskaya. Numbering 6,674 officers and men on the completion of its formation on 10 July, it was organized according to shtat (table of organization and equipment) No. 04/550. The division was almost 70 percent Russian and Ukrainian, and included over 4,000 personnel between the ages of 26 and 40. The 257th Rifle Division was assigned to the front's 56th Army on 8 July, taking up defenses in the region of the stanitsa of Krymskaya. From late July its units engaged in positional fighting in the Moldovanskaya region, tasked with diverting Axis forces to the Kuban sector of the front and not allowing their relocation to other sectors.

The division was relocated to the region of the stanitsas of Dolzhansakya and Semeykino between 24 and 29 August and shifted to the 51st Army. With the 51st Army, the 257th took part in the Donbass Offensive and the Melitopol Offensive. On the night of 1–2 November 1943, the units of the 257th forced a crossing of the Sivash, wading through it. The division took defenses on its southern bank, then fought to hold the bridgehead it captured. In late March 1944 Maykov, now a colonel, took command of the division, which he led for the rest of the war. The 257th fought in the Crimean Offensive, breaking through the German defenses on the Sivash and liberating Sevastopol. For distinguishing itself in the fighting to break through the German fortified defenses on the Perekop Isthmus and in the lake defile on the southern bank of the Sivash the division received the Sivash honorific on 24 April, and for its performance in the liberation of Sevastopol was awarded the Order of Suvorov, 2nd class on 24 May.

After the end of the fighting in Crimea, the division and its parent 51st Army were withdrawn to the Reserve of the Supreme High Command and shifted to the 1st Baltic Front. With the latter, the 257th took part in Operation Bagration, the Šiauliai offensive, the Baltic offensive, and the Memel Offensive. During these operations, the 257th took Biržai and Telšiai. From 12 October the division advanced along the Baltic Sea coast to Libava. On the approaches to the city they encountered sustained German resistance and went over to the defensive. Division commander Maykov was hospitalized due to illness between November 1944 and February 1945.

The 257th remained on the same line in February 1945, and was transferred to the 4th Shock Army. It ended the war blockading the Courland Pocket. Postwar, the division was disbanded at Tambov in December 1945.

== Commanders ==
- Major General Semyon Monakhov (3 July–25 August 1943)
- Major General Aleksandr Pykhtin (26 August–7 December 1943)
- Colonel Aleksandr Maykov (8 December 1943–30 October 1944)
- Colonel Fyodor Safronov (31 October 1944–9 January 1945)
- Colonel Aleksandr Maykov (10 January–December 1945)
