= 21st Guards Rifle Division =

21st Guards Rifle Division (March 17, 1942–1946)
- Active: 1942–1946
- Country: Soviet Union
- Branch: Red Army
- Type: Division
- Role: Infantry
- Engagements: Battles of Rzhev; Operation Seydlitz; Battle for Velikiye Luki; Battle of Nevel (1943); Baltic Offensive; Courland Pocket
- Battle honours: Nevel

Commanders
- Notable commanders: Maj. Gen. Denis Vasilevich Mikhailov; Maj. Gen. Ivan Ivanovich Artamonov; Col. Aleksandr Varfolomeevich Shunkov

The 21st Guards Rifle Division was an elite infantry division of the Red Army during World War II. It was formed from the 361st Rifle Division on March 17, 1942, in recognition of that division's successes in the attempt to encircle the German 9th Army in the Rzhev area during the Soviet winter counteroffensive of 1941–42. After being partially encircled itself in the spring of 1942, the division was withdrawn for rebuilding, and then played a major role in the Battle of Velikiye Luki in 1942–43. It distinguished itself in the battle for Nevel in October, 1943, for which it was awarded a battle honor. The division went on to complete a combat path through northwestern Russia and into the Baltic States, ending its war containing the German forces trapped in the Courland Peninsula.

== Formation ==
After conversion to a Guards division, its basic order of battle was as follows:

- 59th Guards Rifle Regiment (from 1200th Rifle Regiment)
- 64th Guards Rifle Regiment (from 1202nd Rifle Regiment)
- 69th Guards Rifle Regiment (from 1204th Rifle Regiment)
- 47th Guards Artillery Regiment (from 925th Artillery Regiment)

The division remained under the command of Colonel Denis Vasilevich Mikhailov. Following conversion it joined the rest of 39th Army (in Kalinin Front) in attempting to destroy the German forces in and around Olenino, with scant success. A further effort was planned for late May or early June, but this was not implemented, in part due to supply issues; 39th Army, in particular, was in a deep salient west of Sychevka and east of Belyi. On July 2 the German 9th Army began Operation Seydlitz, during which 39th Army's forces were either fully or partially encircled and forced to break out. 9th Army declared the operation completed on July 14, although individual and small groups of Soviet soldiers continued to make their way through the lines for weeks. Later that month the 21st Guards was withdrawn to the Moscow Military District for a complete rebuilding.

=== Battle of Velikiye Luki ===
The 21st Guards returned to the front in November, assigned to 3rd Shock Army in Kalinin Front. It was part of a major buildup of forces in this Army prior to its offensive to liberate the city of Velikiye Luki, which began on the night of November 24. The main attack southwest of the city was made by the 5th Guards Rifle Corps. On November 27, Colonel Mikhailov was promoted to major general. By the next day the division had advanced in the same direction and was holding positions on the Guards Corps' left flank. On the same day the German garrison of the city became encircled, while the German 20th Motorized and 291st Infantry Divisions began arriving on the 21st Guards' sector, intending to break through to their compatriots. The division, along with the adjacent 28th Rifle Division, launched a preemptive attack to hold these divisions in place and prevent them joining the main relief column. It remained holding these positions until the battle ended on January 17, 1943.

It was during this battle that Guards Sergeant Mikhail Ivanovich Budenkov began his career as a sniper. He had been released from hospital in August and was assigned to a mortar unit in the 59th Guards Rifle Regiment. He soon took up sniping in his "spare time", and during the battle he recorded 17 kills. At his own request, he was transferred to a rifle company of the same regiment to take up full-time sniper work, and by the end of the war his score had climbed to 437, putting him in the top ten of Soviet snipers. On March 24, 1945, Budenkov was awarded the Red Star of a Hero of the Soviet Union (Medal No. 7248).

== Battle of Nevel ==
In the buildup to this battle, Guards Sergeant Stepan Vasilevich Petrenko of the 59th Guards Rifle Regiment began working as a sniper. During this period he recorded 36 kills. He went on to officially score 422, also putting him in the top ten of Soviet snipers, and also trained 17 more snipers. He was awarded the Gold Star of a Hero of the Soviet Union on the same day as Budenkov, March 24, 1945 (Medal No. 7252).

As of October 1, the 21st Guards was still in 3rd Shock Army, in Kalinin Front. When the Nevel Offensive Operation began on October 6 the division was in the second echelon. The 54 tanks of the 78th Tank Brigade, plus the 59th Guards Rifle Regiment mounted on all available motorized transport, was prepared as a shock group. The attack began with a reconnaissance in force at 0500 hrs, followed by a ninety-minute artillery preparation, and then by bombing strikes from Soviet aircraft. When the 28th Rifle Division stepped off at 1000 hrs the German 2nd Luftwaffe Field Division, on the north flank of Army Group Center, was utterly routed, and the right flank of the German 263rd Infantry Division of Army Group North was also crushed by 1200 hrs. The shock group, joined by the 163rd Antitank and 827th Howitzer Artillery Regiments, exploited into the gap, and by day's end had liberated Nevel after an advance of 25 km, destroying several enemy garrisons en route, and capturing many warehouses, vehicles, and other equipment. This breakthrough also paved the way for similar advances by elements of 4th Shock Army to the south, while other forces of 3rd Shock, such as the 357th Rifle Division, were fed into the gap. In recognition of this victory the 21st Guards was awarded a battle honor:

"NEVEL – ...21st Guards Rifle Division (Maj. Gen. Mikhailov, Denis Vasilevich)... The troops that participated in the liberation of Nevel, by order of the Supreme Commander-in-Chief of October 7, 1943 and a proclamation of gratitude in Moscow, are given a salute of 12 artillery salvoes of 120 guns."

At the beginning of November the division was still in 3rd Shock, which was now part of 2nd Baltic Front. On November 2 it led, alongside the 46th Guards Rifle Division, a new offensive from the northern sector of the Nevel salient in the direction of the town of Pustoshka. The assault force rapidly smashed through the 16th Army's Group von Below before turning the right flank of the I Army Corps' 58th Infantry Division and pivoting to the north. By November 7 the Army's lead elements had penetrated more than 30 km deep on a front of 40 km, although the German forces lining the corridor to the east refused to withdraw even when deeply outflanked.

In early December the 21st Guards was subordinated to the 93rd Rifle Corps. On December 16 this Corps attacked in the Ust-Dolyssa region against the flank of the German corridor north of Nevel. The attack dented the defenses of the German 290th Infantry Division but failed to penetrate, and was soon called off. Before the end of the year the division joined the 100th Rifle Corps.

== Advance ==
In January, 1944, the 21st Guards was briefly assigned to the 7th Guards Rifle Corps in 10th Guards Army, before moving back to 100th Corps, which was now in the 22nd Army. In late May, 1944, General Mikhailov finally left command of the division to take over command of this Corps. He was replaced by Col. Ivan Ivanovich Artamonov, who was promoted to major general on July 29. The 21st Guards took part in the Baltic Offensive under these commands. General Artamonov left his command on October 24, and was succeeded by four more commanding officers through the duration of the war:

- Maj. Gen. Lazar Yefimovich Fishman (October 25 – November 17, 1944)
- Maj. Gen. Vasily Petrovich Fyodorov (November 18, 1944 – January 13, 1945)
- Col. Aleksandr Varfolomeevich Shunkov (January 14 – April 4, 1945)
- Col. Tikhon Savilevich Shumsky (April 5 – after May 9, 1945)

It remained in 100th Corps until February, 1945, when the Corps was withdrawn into reserve. The 21st Guards was then transferred to the 1st Shock Army, and it spent the rest of the war containing the German forces trapped in the Courland Pocket. It then had the official title of 21st Guards Rifle, Nevel Division (Russian: 21-я гвардейская стрелковая Невельская дивизия).

With the 23rd Guards Rifle Corps of the 11th Guards Army, the division was based at Kuldīga in Latvia from mid-1945. It was disbanded there in 1946.
