= 363 BC =

363 BC in various calendars
Gregorian calendar	363 BC; CCCLXIII BC
Ab urbe condita	391
Ancient Egypt era	XXX dynasty, 18
Pharaoh	Nectanebo I, 18
Ancient Greek Olympiad (summer)	104th Olympiad, year 2
Assyrian calendar	4388
Balinese saka calendar	N/A
Bengali calendar	−956 – −955
Berber calendar	588
Buddhist calendar	182
Burmese calendar	−1000
Byzantine calendar	5146–5147
Chinese calendar	丁巳年 (Fire Snake); 2335 or 2128 — to — 戊午年 (Earth Horse); 2336 or 2129
Coptic calendar	−646 – −645
Discordian calendar	804
Ethiopian calendar	−370 – −369
Hebrew calendar	3398–3399
- Hindu calendars
Vikram Samvat	−306 – −305
Shaka Samvat	N/A
Kali Yuga	2738–2739
Holocene calendar	9638
Iranian calendar	984 BP – 983 BP
Islamic calendar	1014 BH – 1013 BH
Javanese calendar	N/A
Julian calendar	N/A
Korean calendar	1971
Minguo calendar	2274 before ROC 民前2274年
Nanakshahi calendar	−1830
Thai solar calendar	180–181
Tibetan calendar	阴火蛇年 (female Fire-Snake) −236 or −617 or −1389 — to — 阳土马年 (male Earth-Horse) −235 or −616 or −1388

Year 363 BC was a year of the pre-Julian Roman calendar. At the time, it was known as the Year of the Consulship of Aventinensis and Mamercinus (or, less frequently, year 391 Ab urbe condita). The denomination 363 BC for this year has been used since the early medieval period, when the Anno Domini calendar era became the prevalent method in Europe for naming years.

== Events ==
=== By place ===
==== Egypt ====
- The Egyptian pharaoh Teos (or Tachos) succeeds his father Nectanebo I to the throne. Planning a great attack on Persia, he invites Sparta to help him.

==== Greece ====
- The Theban general, Epaminondas, makes a bold attempt to challenge Athens' naval empire. With a new Boeotian fleet, he sails to Byzantium, with the result that a number of cities in the Athenian Empire rebel against their now threatened masters.

== Births ==
- Barsine, mistress of Alexander the Great

== Deaths ==
- Nectanebo I, pharaoh of Egypt
- Marquess Gong of Han, ruler of the State of Han
