= Leninskoye, Amur Oblast =

Leninskoye Ленинское
- Selo
- Location within Amur Oblast Location within Russia
- Coordinates: 49°15′N 129°57′E
- Country: Russia
- Region: Amur Oblast
- District: Arkharinsky District
- Time zone: UTC+9:00

Leninskoye (Russian: Ле́нинское) is a rural locality (a selo) and the administrative center of Leninsky Selsoviet of Arkharinsky District, Amur Oblast, Russia. The population was 299 as of 2018. There are 9 streets.

== Geography ==
Leninskoye is located near the left bank of the Arkhara River, 30 km southwest of Arkhara (the district's administrative centre) by road. Volnoye is the nearest rural locality.
