= Tomsky Uyezd =

Tomsk uyezd Томский уезд
- Uyezd
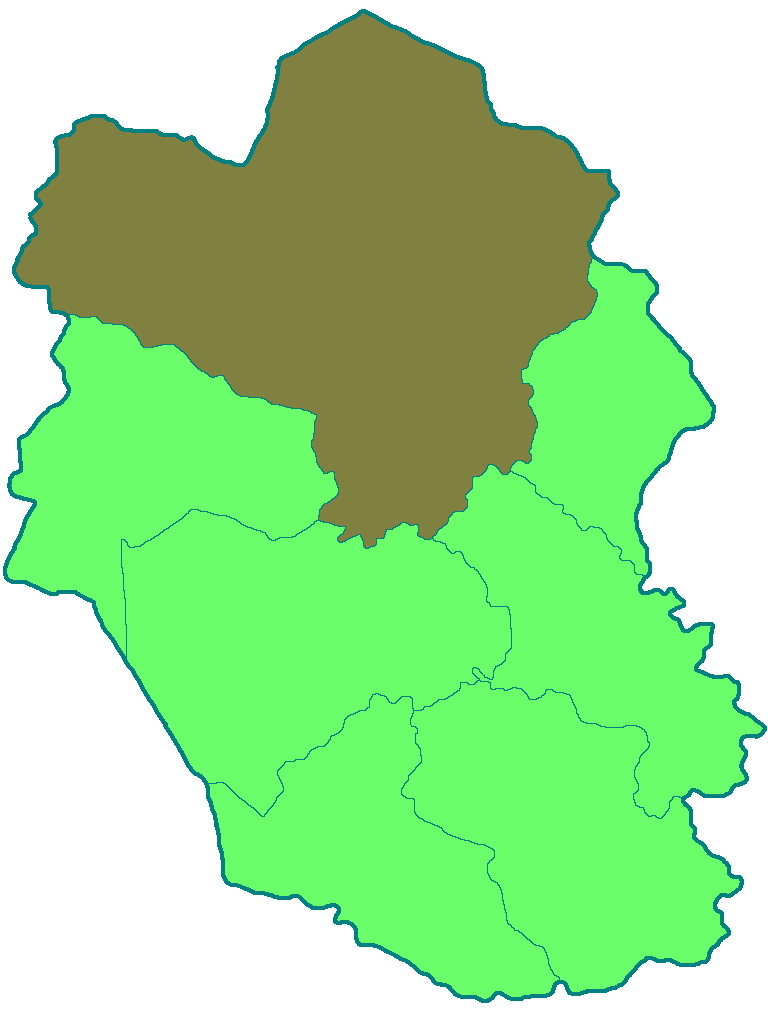
- Location in Tomsk Governorate
- Country: Russian Empire
- Viceroyalty: Tobolsk
- Governorate: Tomsk
- Established: 1629
- Abolished: 1925
- Administrative center: Tomsk

Population (1897)
  - Total: 277,135

Tomsky Uyezd (Russian: Томский уезд), known as Tomsk Okrug during some periods, was an administrative division (an uyezd) of Tomsk Governorate. Its administrative center was the city of Tomsk.

The uyezd existed until the abolition of the governorate in May 1925. Its territory became part of Tomsky Okrug of Siberian Krai. The former territory of the uyezd is now part of Tomsk Oblast, Novosibirsk Oblast and Kemerovo Oblast.

== History ==
- From 1604: Tomsky Uyezd of Tobolsk Razryad.
- From 1629 — Tomsky Uyezd of Tomsk Razryad.
- From 1708 — Tomsky Uyezd of Siberia Governorate.
- From 1719 — Tomsky Uyezd of Tobolsk Province of Siberia Governorate
- From 1764 — Tomsky Uyezd of Tobolsk Governorate.
- From 1779 — Tomsky Okrug of Kolyvanskaya oblast.
- From 1782 — Tomsky Uyezd of Tomsk Oblast, Tobolsk Viceroyalty.
- From 1796 — Tomsky Uyezd of Tomsk Oblast, Tobolsk Governorate.
- From 1804 — Tomsky Uyezd of Tomsk Governorate. The former Narymsky Uyezd, the northern part of the Tomsk region, was included in the Tomsky Uyezd. During the 19th and first half of the 20th centuries this part of Tomsky Uyezd was called Narymsky Krai.
- From 1822 – Tomsky Okrug of Tomsk Governorate.
- From 1898 — Tomsky Uyezd of Tomsk Governorate.
- From 1925 — Tomsky Okrug of Siberian Krai

== Administrative divisions ==
Tomsky Uyezd included 25 volosts in 1913:

- Babarykinskoye volost — village of Babarykinskoye,
- Bogoroskoye volost — village of Bogorodskoye,
- Bugrinskoye volost – village of Bugrinskoye
- Varyukhino volost — village of Varyukhino
- Yelgayskoye volost – village of Yelgayskoye
- Ishim volost - village of Ishim
- Kaylinskoye volost - village of Kaylinskoye
- Kamenka volost – village of Kamenka
- Ketsk volost – village of Ketsk
- Kozhevnikovskoye volsot
- Karpysak volost
- Nelyubino volost
- Nikolayevskoye volost
- Novo-Aleksandrovsky volost
- Novo-Kuskovskoye volost
- Oyash volost
- Parabelskoye volost
- Petropavlovskoye volost
- Semiluzhnoye volost – village of Semiluzhnoye
- Spasskoye volost
- Suzhdanskoye volost
- Tutalskoye volost – village of Tutalskoye
- Talovka volost – village of Talovka
- Urtam volost — village of Voronovo
- Chaus volost – village of Chaus

In 1920, the following volosts were included in Tomsky Uyezd: Arlyukskaya, Varyukhinskaya, Voznesenskaya, Yemelyanovskaya, Ishimskaya, Pachinskaya, Pashkovskaya, Polomoshinskaya, Poperechenskaya, Proskokovskaya, Romanovskaya, Suzhdenskaya, Talovskaya, Teleutskaya, Tutalskaya, Yaya-Petropavlovskaya
