= 421st Rifle Division =

421st Rifle Division (September 1, 1941 – November 13, 1941)
- Active: 1941
- Country: Soviet Union
- Branch: Red Army
- Type: Division
- Role: Infantry
- Engagements: Siege of Odessa (1941)

Commanders
- Notable commanders: Col. Grigorii Matveevich Kochenov

The 421st Rifle Division was raised in 1941 as an infantry division of the Red Army, and served briefly after the German invasion, Operation Barbarossa, in that role. The division was formed from assets of the Odessa Military District after its namesake city came under siege by a mainly-Romanian force, and it immediately became part of the Separate Coastal Army. It was one of several improvised Soviet formations that saw service in this fighting, and its order of battle changed considerably over the course of its short existence. Prior to the fall of Odessa on October 16 what remained of the division was evacuated to the Crimea. On November 13 it was disbanded to provide replacement troops and equipment for other units defending the fortress of Sevastopol. The 421st was never reformed.

== Formation ==
The 421st began forming on September 1, 1941 in Odessa in the Odessa Military District. Its order of battle, based on the last prewar shtat (table of organization and equipment) of April 5, 1941 for rifle divisions, was as follows:

- 1327th Rifle Regiment (from October 25)
- 1330th Rifle Regiment (until October 26; re-designated as 1331st)
- 3rd Naval Rifle Regiment (September 26 – October 15)
- 54th Rifle Regiment (until September 26)
- 983rd Artillery Regiment
- 134th Howitzer Artillery Regiment
- 705th Antiaircraft Battalion
- 480th Reconnaissance Company
- 688th Sapper Battalion (later 247th)
- 860th Signal Battalion (later 150th)
- 503rd Medical/Sanitation Battalion
- 484th Chemical Protection (Anti-gas) Company
- 513th Motor Transport Company
- 318th Field Bakery
- 1474th Field Postal Station
- 865th Field Office of the State Bank

It was formed on the basis of the Eastern Group of Forces of the Odessa Military District, including militia, border guards and reservists. From September 3 to September 10 it was designated as the Odessa Rifle Division, but then reverted to the 421st. Col. Grigorii Matveevich Kochenov was appointed to command on the day the division began forming and remained in that position until it was disbanded. It immediately came under command of the Separate Coastal Army.

== Service ==
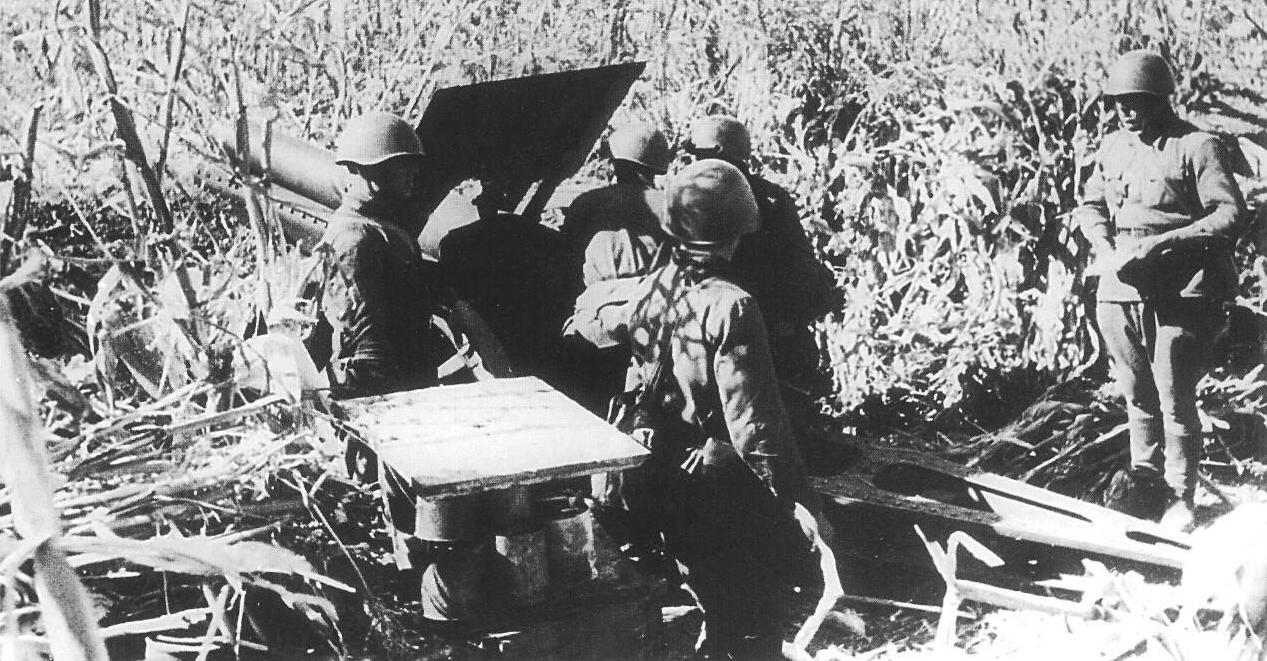
A Soviet gun crew during the siege.

The division was one of the mainstays of the Soviet defense of Odessa from the time it formed. In the Combat Composition of the Soviet Army for October 1 a "3rd Black Sea Regiment of Naval Infantry" is listed in the Coastal Army along with the 421st; it may be 3rd Naval Rifle Regiment listed above. The division was evacuated to the Crimea prior to the fall of Odessa on October 16, and by November 7 it was at Yalta on the Crimean coast, still in Separate Coastal Army. Six days later it was officially disbanded to reinforce other units defending Sevastopol, although the Combat Composition for December 1 lists a "1130th Rifle Regiment (421st Rifle Division)" in the Coastal Army. One author identifies the 1330th Rifle Regiment of 421st Infantry (sic) Division reaching Yalta on November 7 and continuing to serve in Sector 1 of the Sevastopol defenses at least until January, 1942.
