= 50th Rifle Division =

Soviet Union infantry division

- Active: 1936–1947
- Country: Soviet Union
- Branch: Red Army / Soviet Army
- Type: Infantry
- Size: Division
- Engagements: World War II; Invasion of Poland; Winter War; Eastern Front; Battle of Smolensk; Battle of Moscow; Battles of Rzhev; Dnieper-Carpathian Offensive; First Jassy–Kishinev Offensive; Second Jassy–Kishinev Offensive; Vistula-Oder Offensive; Berlin Offensive
- Decorations: Order of the Red Banner; Order of Suvorov; Order of Kutuzov
- Battle honours: Zaporizhia; Kirovograd

Commanders
- Notable commanders: Arkady Boreyko

The 50th Rifle Division was an infantry division of the Red Army from 1936 to 1946. The division took part in the Soviet invasion of Poland and the Winter War. After Germany launched Operation Barbarossa, the 50th fought in the Battle of Moscow, the Battles of Rzhev, the Donbass Strategic Offensive, the Dnieper–Carpathian Offensive, the First and Second Jassy–Kishinev Offensive, the Vistula–Oder Offensive and the Berlin Offensive.

== History ==
In May 1936, the division was formed from Construction Headquarters No. 27 as the Urovskaya Division of the Polotsk Fortified Region. It took part in the Soviet invasion of Poland in September 1939. On 17 September, it was part of the 3rd Army's 4th Rifle Corps. On 2 October, it was transferred to the 10th Rifle Corps of the same army.

The 50th Rifle Division then fought in the Winter War. On 28 December, it was stationed in the region near Lake Sukhodolskoye. On 18 January 1940, it was subordinated to the 13th Army. The division became part of the 30th Rifle Corps on 30 January. On 21 January, the division went to the front lines. From 1–2 February, it fought in the Pasuri village on the Karelian Isthmus. On 11 February, it again attacked Finnish positions at Pasuri. It broke through the Finnish positions at Salmenkayta due to its artillery support, which damaged the morale of the defenders. On 23 February, it was stationed near the Salmenkayta River. Between 1–7 April, the division was transported by train back to Belarus.

The division was then based in Lida and was part of the 21st Rifle Corps. In January 1941, it returned to Polotsk. On 22 June, Germany attacked the Soviet Union in Operation Barbarossa. According to the Western Front order of 24 June, the 21st Rifle Corps, including the division, became part of the 13th Army. It defended the line of the Viliya River northwest of Molodechno. The division received orders to advance on Ashmyany. However, divisional intelligence discovered that German armored and motorized forces were present in the town. The division was forced to retreat towards Molodechno under pressure from the German motorized troops. After the German capture of Minsk on 26 June, 13th Army was split into several groups. Molodechno was captured by German troops the next day. The 50th Rifle Division then retreated along the northern flank towards the Berezina River north of Barysaw. On the morning of 30 June, the division was in region of Lahoysk and Plyeshchanitsy. The remnants of the 64th Rifle Division and the 100th Rifle Division's 331st Rifle Regiment were attached to the division there. On 1 July, the division withdrew from Plyeshchanitsy. On 2 July, the division was attacked by German troops of the 20th Motorized Division advancing down the Logoysky road and was forced to retreat from Begoml. However, the division was able to hold the German advance for three days during fighting north of Barysaw. On 5 July, the division began the retreat to Syanno and was fighting near Vitebsk from 7 July. On 11 July, it was sent to Velizh to be rebuilt due to heavy losses. On 14 July, German troops attacked Velizh and the division had to retreat to the east.

On 23 July, remnants of the division were withdrawn from the fighting with the intention of reinforcing positions 12 kilometers east of Vyazma. The division became part of 19th Army's reserve on 2 August. On 6 August, the division was sent back into combat during the Battle of Smolensk. The division advanced 17 kilometers from Yartsevo and then held defensive positions on the line of Ryadnyi, Osipova and Chistaya. The division was still holding the positions on 3 October, southeast of Dukhovshchina, but on 4 October, it withdrew to the line of the Vop River and defend the east bank at Kurganova, Podylische and Ozerische, repulsing German attempts at crossing the river. On 5 October, army commander Ivan Konev ordered the division to move to Vyazma. Due to various motor transport delays, the division didn't arrive at Vyazma until 7 October. Upon its arrival, the division was ordered by Rokossovsky to defend the northern approaches to the city. Due to the German advance, the division was then forced to retreat to the east. It was able to escape being encircled in the Vyazma Pocket.

On 19 October, the division fought in the battle for Vereya but was immediately removed and transferred to the area of Dorokhovo and Shchalikovo, covering the Mozhaysk approaches. Having made a night march, the division arrived at the Shchalikovo area by the morning of 20 October and fought in combat with advancing German troops. By the evening of 20 October, the division moved across the Protva River near Alexino and Petrischeva. It then withdrew to Dorokhov, where it organized a defence. The division was assisted by the remnants of the 19th and 103rd Rifle Divisions. On 23 October, the division came under heavy attack along with the 22nd Tank Brigade and was forced to retreat eastwards. On 25 October, more than 800 personnel of the 230th Reserve Training Rifle Regiment, attached to the division, were killed in the village of Gorbovo. By 31 October, the division had stopped its retreat at Tuchkovo.

From 16 November to 11 December, it held the line at Polushkino, Hertz and Agafonov. On 2 December, it was involved in heavy fighting in the villages of Trioitskye, Kriushi and Vlasov. On 11 December, it went on the offensive, crossing the Moskva River on 13 December and capturing several villages. The division continued to advance and by 20 December had captured Krasotinom, Kozhin and the village of Kagonovich on the south bank of the Moskva. On 21 December, German troops launched a heavy counterattack and the division was forced to withdraw across the river.

On 11 January 1942, the division began a renewed offensive and recaptured Tuchkovo. On 12 January, it continued to advance in towards Mozhaisk and surrounded German troops in Beloborodova. On 13 January, it captured Dubrovka. Continuing to pursue the German troops from Dorokhovo, the division by 16 January was at the line of Kostino, Krasny Stan, Alexandrovo, Mikhailovsky, and Bugaylovo. By the morning of 17 January, the division had captured the village of Pervomaisk. On 19 January, the division, in conjunction with the 20th Tank Brigade, bunkered down in the area of Makarovo and Teterino. From then until April, it was fighting west of Gzhatsk, where the division met resistance from German troops and fought there until the beginning of 1943. At the beginning of 1943, the division was transferred to the line of the Siversky Donets, where the Voroshilovgrad Offensive had recently failed. The division took up positions at the bend of the Siversky Donets but upon arrival attacked and captured a bridgehead across the river at the village of Tatyanovka. However, the division was forced to retreat to the other bank and was relocated downstream to the Sidorovka area.

On 17 July, the division crossed the Donets during the Izyum-Barvenkovo Offensive and was able to capture a small bridgehead. The division participated in the Donbass Strategic Offensive from 13 August. It advanced through Pavlogradsky District. During the Zaporizhia Offensive, the division participated in the capture of Zaporizhia on 14 October. On 14 October 1943, the division was awarded the honorific "Zaporizhia" for its actions during the capture of the city. During the Aleksandriia–Znamenka Offensive during November and December, the division advanced to the area of Znamenka.

The division resumed the offensive on 5 January 1944 during the Kirovograd Offensive. By 7 January, it had captured Kirovograd and was awarded the honorific of that name two days later. From 9 to 12 January, it led the advance on Alt Danzig. Advancing on the right flank of the 9th Guards Airborne Division, the division began the drive on Pervomaisk during the Uman–Botoșani Offensive on 3 March. On 29 March, it received the Order of the Red Banner for its actions during the offensive. At the beginning of April, the division became part of the front reserve. By May, it had been transferred to the bridgehead on the Prut north of Iași. During May and June, it led the defence of the bridgehead at the key position of Ollarilor. On 19 August, the division began to advance and led fighting 13 kilometers north of Iași ("Jassy"). The division was one of the units fighting in the capture of Iași on 21 August. On 5 September, the division was placed in reserve and transferred to the Volodymyr-Volynskyi. From there it was sent to the area of Gmina Jeżowe, Rozvaduv and Rudnik.

The division became part of the 52nd Army's 73rd Rifle Corps from January 1945. On 17 January 1945, the division resumed the offensive in the Sandomierz–Silesian Offensive. It advanced toward Staszów, Radomsko, and Gmina Rychtal. On 25 January, it fought in the capture of Oleśnica and by the end of the month was at Breslau. The division fought in the siege of Breslau. On the night of 30 January, the division crossed the Oder 10 kilometers northwest of Breslau. From February onwards, it fought in the Lower Silesian Offensive. It received the Order of Suvorov 2nd class on 19 February 1945 for its actions. During fierce fighting at the end of March, it advanced to Bunzlau. It then fought in the Berlin Offensive from 16 April. On that day, it led the fighting for Gross Krausha, 9 kilometers north of Görlitz. In May, the division fought in the Prague Offensive. It advanced on Prague from the north through Mladá Boleslav. The division ended the war in Prague. It was still subordinated to the 52nd Army of the 1st Ukrainian Front at the end of the war. On 26 May, the division was awarded the Order of Kutuzov 2nd class.

Postwar, the division transferred to Sambir in the Carpathian Military District with the corps. The division was disbanded in 1947.

== Commanders ==
The following officers commanded the division:

- Kombrig Yury Novoselsky (8 August 1937–July 1938))
- Colonel Sergey Goryachev (19 October 1938 – November 1939)
- Major General Stepan Yeryomin (December 1939 – July 1940)
- Major General Vasily Yevdokimov (August 1940 – 1 August 1941; MIA)
- Colonel Arkady Boreyko (2 August 1941 – 16 October 1941)
- Colonel Sergey Iovlev (17–18 October 1941)
- Kombrig Muhammad Sakov Ahmed (19 October 1941 – 20 October 1942)
- Major General Nikita Lebedenko (21 October 1942 – 12 March 1942)
- Colonel Pyotr Berestov (13 March 1942 – 4 April 1942)
- Major General Nikita Lebedenko (5 April 1942 – 7 March 1944)
- Colonel Nikolai Ruban (8 March 1944 – 9 May 1945)
- Major General Vasily Vasilyev (1945–1946)

== Composition ==
The 50th Rifle Division included the following units:

- 2nd Rifle Regiment
- 49th Rifle Regiment
- 359th Rifle Regiment
- 202nd Light Artillery Regiment
- 257th Howitzer Artillery Regiment
- 480th Mortar Battalion (1 November 1941 – 20 October 1942)
- 89th Separate Antitank Battalion
- 6th Reconnaissance Battalion
- 68th Separate Sapper Battalion
- 81st Separate Communications Battalion (later 81st, then 1443rd Separate Communications Company)
- 614th (later 10th) Medical Battalion
- 107th Separate Chemical Defence Company
- 41st (later 130th) Trucking Company
- 125th (later 273rd) Field Bakery
- 51st Divisional Veterinary Hospital
- 883rd Field Post Office
- 320th Field Ticket Office of the State Bank
