= Gorbovo =

Gorbovo may refer to:

- Gorbovo, Babayevsky District, Vologda Oblast
- Gorbovo, Novlenskoye Rural Settlement, Vologodsky District, Vologda Oblast
- Gorbovo, Sosnovskoye Rural Settlement, Vologodsky District, Vologda Oblast
- Gorbovo, a village where 800 soldiers with the 50th Rifle Division (Soviet Union) died on 25 October 1941
