= Berestov =

Berestov may refer to:

- Berestov, Belarus, now known as Brest
- Dmitry Berestov (born 1980), Russian weightlifter
- Pyotr Berestov (1896–1961), Russian and Soviet army officer
- Valentin Berestov (1928—1998), Russian poet

== See also ==
- Berestove, a historical location in Kyiv, Ukraine
- Berestove, Bakhmut Raion, Donetsk Oblast, a village in Ukraine
- Berestove rural hromada, Berdiansk Raion, Zaporizhzhia Oblast, Ukraine
