= Teterino =

Teterino (Russian: Тетерино) is the name of several rural localities in Russia:

- Teterino, Kovrovsky District, Vladimir Oblast, a village in Malyginskoye Rural Settlement of Kovrovsky District, Vladimir Oblast
- Teterino, Sobinsky District, Vladimir Oblast, a village in Vorshinskoye Rural Settlement in Sobinsky District, Vladimir Oblast
- Teterino, Suzdalsky District, Vladimir Oblast, a village in Seletskoye Rural Settlement, Suzdalsky District, Vladimir Oblast
