= Mozginyh tenement house (Moscow) =

- Доходный дом Мозгиных
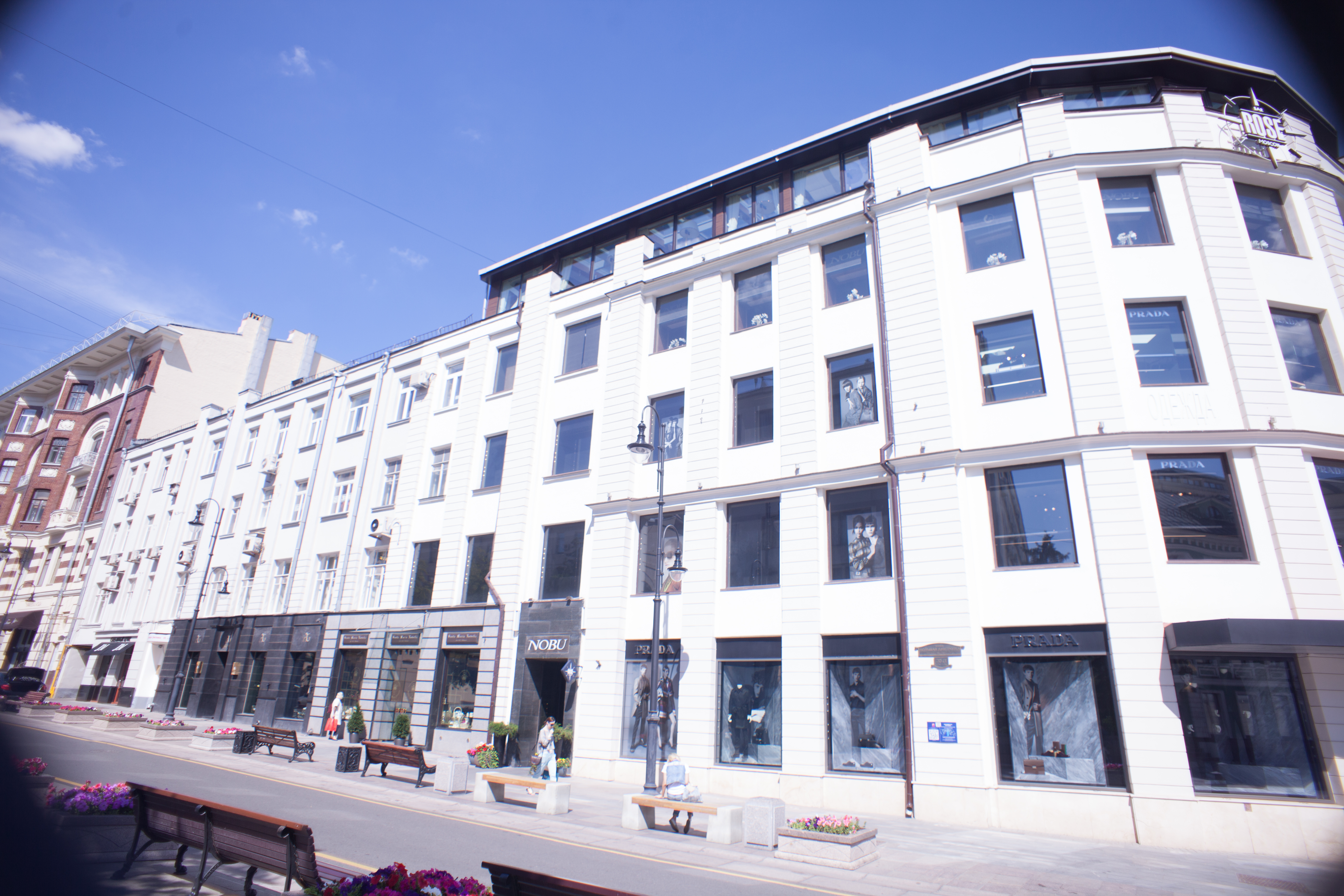
- Interactive map of Mozginyh tenement house
- Location: Building 1, 20/5 Bolshaya Dmitrovka Street, Moscow
- Coordinates: 55°45′46″N 37°36′49″E

The Mozginyh tenement house (Russian: Доходный дом Мозгиных) is a historic building in the center of Moscow (Bolshaya Dmitrovka Street, house 20/5, building 1), built in the early 20th century.

== History ==
The city estate on the corner of Bolshaya Dmitrovka and Stoleshnikov alley in the early 19th century belonged to ensign Kozhin. The main house overlooked Bolshaya Dmitrovka, and the outhouse was located on the side of the alley. M. Yu. Lermontov visited the estate of his university friend Tilicheev. In the middle of the 21st century, the owner of the estate was the provincial secretary Zasekin, he rented part of the premises for rent. In the late 1840s – early 1850s, there was a photographic studio of the Daguerreotype Institution of Peixis, one of the first in Moscow. It also housed the "Music Shop" P. Jurgenson and the office of the Russian Music Society, in which he received visitors N. Rubinshtein. In the house there were many famous musicians.

At the end of the 19th century, the property was owned by the merchant I. Savostyanov, in the 1900s he sold it to the merchant of the second guild P. Mozgin. With him in the mansion is located "Shop crafts." In 1911, in the courtyard of the site in neoclassical style, a five-storey apartment house was built (architect K. L. Rosenkampf, house 20/5, building 2). Before the revolution, this building housed the civil engineering office of P. P. Visnevsky, where the beginning architects were brothers Vesnina.

In 1914, the son of a merchant M. Mozgin decided to build a new profitable house in the corner part of the site. The construction was carried out according to the project of the architect N. A. Eikhenvald, but was interrupted due to the First World War. It was possible to build only part of the first floor. In the 1920s, the site with long construction was transferred to the publisher of the newspaper Pravda. To complete the building, the Pravdist Housing and Construction Cooperative, headed by the correspondent of Pravda, M. E. Koltsov, was organized. In 1925 the house was completed according to the new modest avant-garde project of the same architect N. A. Eichenwald. However, due to the similarity of the Pravdist housing complex and the Fat-bone housing complex, built around the same time, it can be assumed that Euchenwald was co-authored by the constructivist architect P. Kuchnistov.

In the house lived mainly writers and journalists: M. E. Koltsov, K. G. Paustovsky, R. I. Fraerman, E. B. Pasternak, Efim Zozulya, O. A. Gorchakov. On the ground floor during the Soviet era, a commissioned fur store operated with a stuffed wolf in the window.

In 2010, the attic space was reconstructed, and the interstitial vanes were trimmed under the roof.
