= Aranlı =

Aranlı (Aranly) may refer to:

- Aranlı, Bilasuvar, Azerbaijan
- Aranlı, Imishli, Azerbaijan
