= Godfrey Palmer =

Godfrey Palmer may refer to:

- Godfrey Palmer (politician) (1878–1933), English industrialist and Liberal Party politician.
- Godfrey Palmer (rugby union) (1900–1972), English rugby union player and Army officer

== See also ==
- Geoff Palmer (scientist) (1940–2025), born Godfrey Henry Oliver Palmer, Jamaican-British academic
