= Council of Labor and Defense Building =

Meeting place of the Russian State Duma

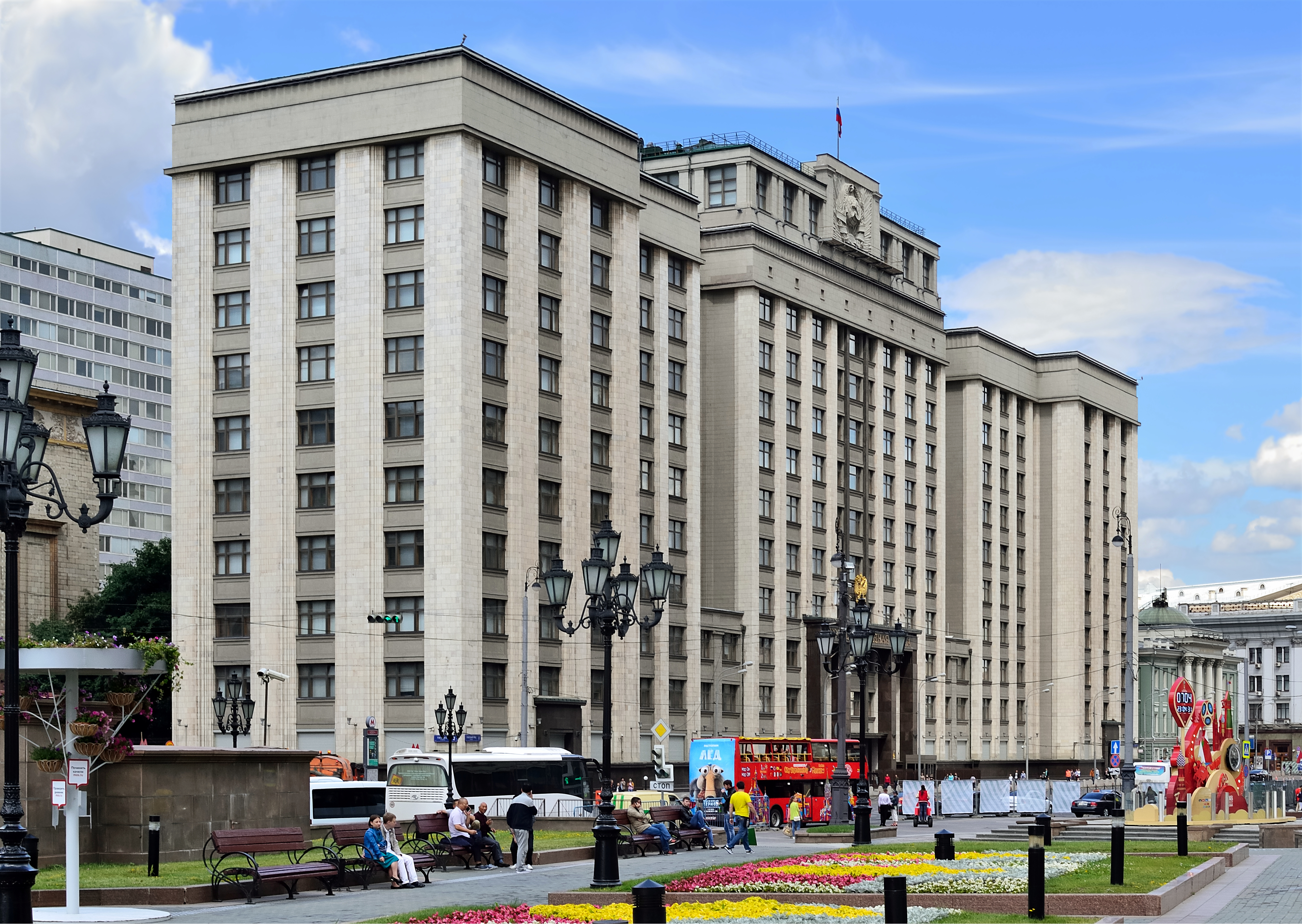
- Interactive map of the Council of Labor and Defense Building area

General information
- Location: Tverskoy District, Moscow, Russia, 1 Okhotny Ryad
- Coordinates: 55°45′28″N 37°36′57″E
- Current tenants: State Duma of the Russian Federation
- Construction started: 1932
- Opened: 1935; 91 years ago

Design and construction
- Architect: Arkady Langman

Website
- duma.gov.ru

The Council of Labor and Defense Building (Russian: Здание Совета труда и обороны, romanized: Zdaniye Soveta truda i oborony) is a state building located on Okhotny Ryad in central Moscow, Russia, 250 meters north of the Kremlin. Since 1994 it has served as the meeting place of the State Duma, the lower house of the Russian parliament. It is alternatively known as State Duma Building (Russian: Здание Государственной думы) or the Okhotny Ryad Building (Russian: здание на Охотном Ряду). It has a regional-level cultural heritage status.

== History ==
The idea of erecting a large representative building near the House of Unions arose in the mid-1920s. In 1926, a competition was held for the design of the building for the State Bank of the USSR, however, construction on this site was also abandoned and the old State Bank Building on Neglinnaya Street was reconstructed based on a design by Ivan Zholtovsky. In the early 1930s, simultaneously with the competition for the Mossoviet Hotel, a competition was announced for an Hotel Intourist project on the other side of the street, but soon this was abandoned and the Soviet authorities decided to build an office building for the Council of Labor and Defense on the site. (Note: Another Hotel Intourist was built on nearby Tverskaya Street in 1970; it was later demolished and became the Carlton Moscow.)

To clear a place for the building, the restored Church of Paraskeva Pyatnitsa and the Golitsyn Chambers of the 17th century were demolished over the objections of art critics, but the nearby Troyekurov Chambers survived. Without announcing a competition, the design was entrusted to the architect Arkady Yakovlevich Langman, who completed it with the participation of architects S. Sergiyevsky and N. Meziere. By that time, Langman already had experience in the construction of large structures in Moscow: the Dynamo Stadium (together with Lazar Cherikover) and the Dynamo Society House (together with Ivan Fomin).

Langman coordinated the height parameters of the building with the Mossoviet Hotel – nearly the same height of both buildings – which was supposed to conceal the large relief difference from Lubyanskaya to Manezhnaya Squares and create the illusion of straightness of the front street, running to the new architectural highlight of Moscow – the Palace of the Soviets. Nikita Khrushchev, then head of the city, recalled how the architects discussed the project with the future "owner" of the building Vyacheslav Molotov (chairman of the Labor and Defense Council). Ivan Zholtovsky said that the project was acceptable, but not expressive, and to prove his words, he turned the picture upside down: "Can it be built like this? It is possible, it will not lose anything aesthetically, and no one will notice."

The Council of Labor and Defense Building of was built in 1932–35, however, Langman's plan was not fully implemented. According to the initial project, the uniformly designed corps were supposed to form a square and to include the House of the Unions. Criticism from the chief architect of Moscow Sergey Chernyshyov forced to abandon these plans.

== Ownership ==
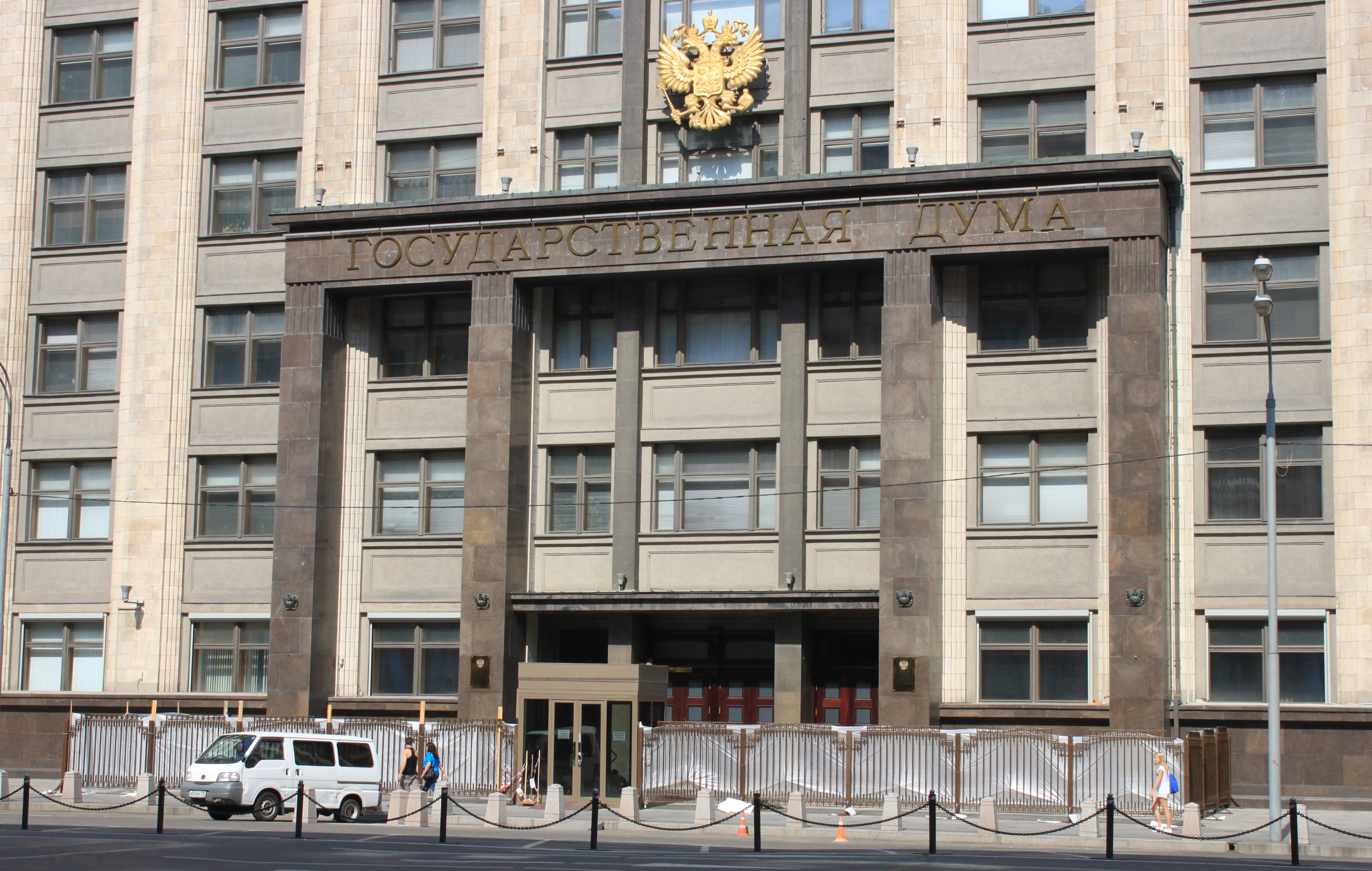
Entrance to the Council of Labor and Defense Building

In April 1937, two years after the completion of the building, the Council of Labor and Defense itself was dissolved. In a guide to Moscow that year, the building was listed as the House of the Council of People's Commissars of the USSR. Later, the building belonged to the Council of Ministers of the USSR, and finally to the State Planning Committee. Since 1994, the State Duma of the Russian Federation has been working in the building.

In the early 2010s businessman Mikhail Gutseriyev announced that after the construction of a new parliamentary center in Mnyovniki, the State Duma building would be demolished to build a hotel or a shopping center, but such plans have not come to fruition.

== Overview ==
The building plan is symmetrical. The long main and narrow side facades are decorated with high fluted pilasters. The main facade is dissected by two side and central projections. In the central risalit there is a flat entrance portico, which is close in proportion to the columnar portico of the House of the Unions standing nearby. On the front plane of the attic there is a state emblem of the Soviet Union, and on the roof there is a flagpole with the flag of Russia. Stylistically, the design of the Council of Labor and Defense Building combines both elements of constructivism, as well as monumentality and representativeness – features inherent to the Stalinist period of Soviet architecture to come.

By the commencement of the exterior ornamentation, deposits of the marble-like limestone from near Kolomna turned out to be exhausted, so slabs removed from the Cathedral of Christ the Savior, demolished in 1931, were used instead. The granular plaster covering the internal facade is made of stone chips, which were obtained by grinding marble facings of the large numbers of Moscow churches demolished in the 1930s. The same materials were used to decorate the Okhotny Ryad metro station being built at that time; one of its exits was originally planned to be placed inside the building. The three entrance arches are made of labradorite and Karelian granite.

== Gallery ==
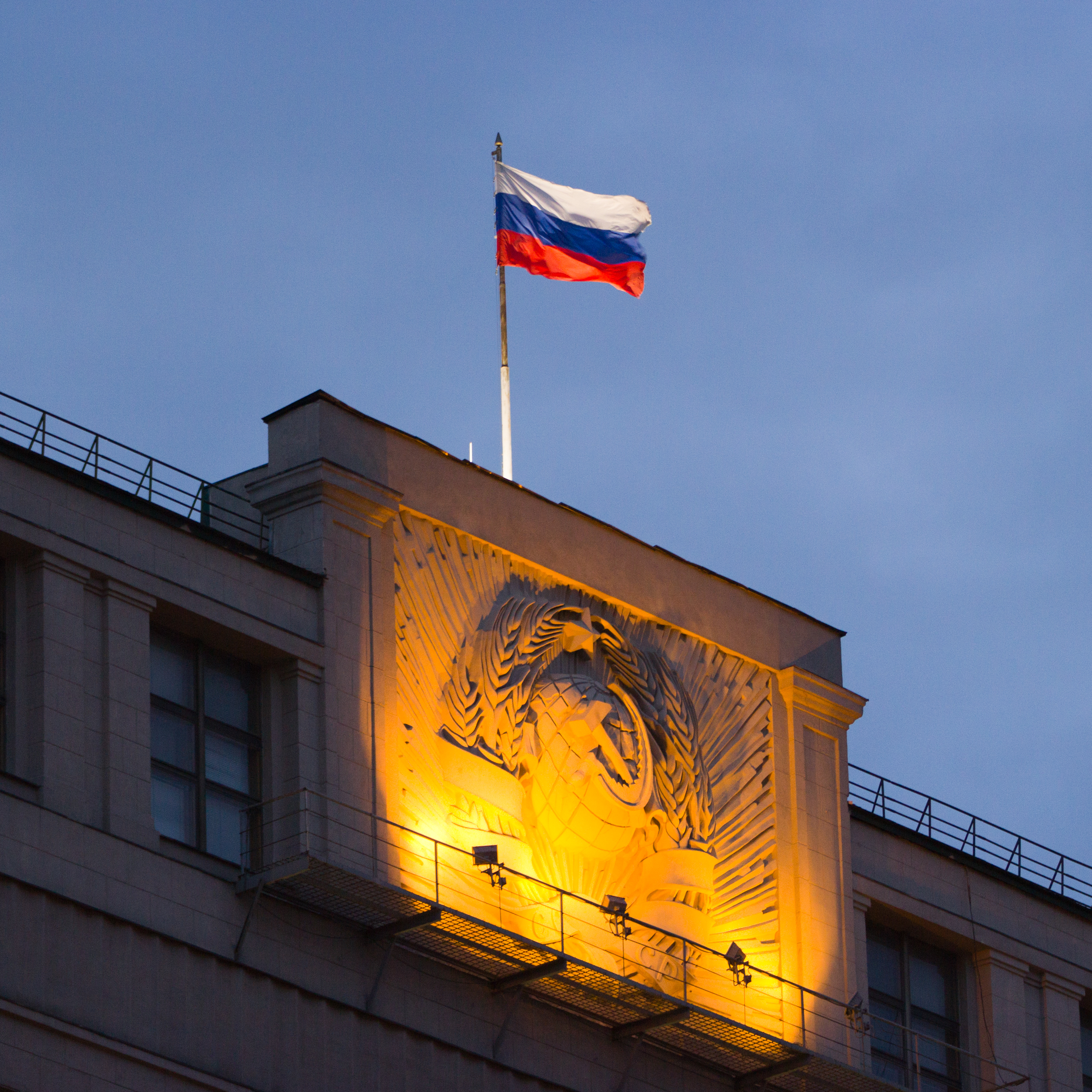
State emblem of the USSR and Russian national flag

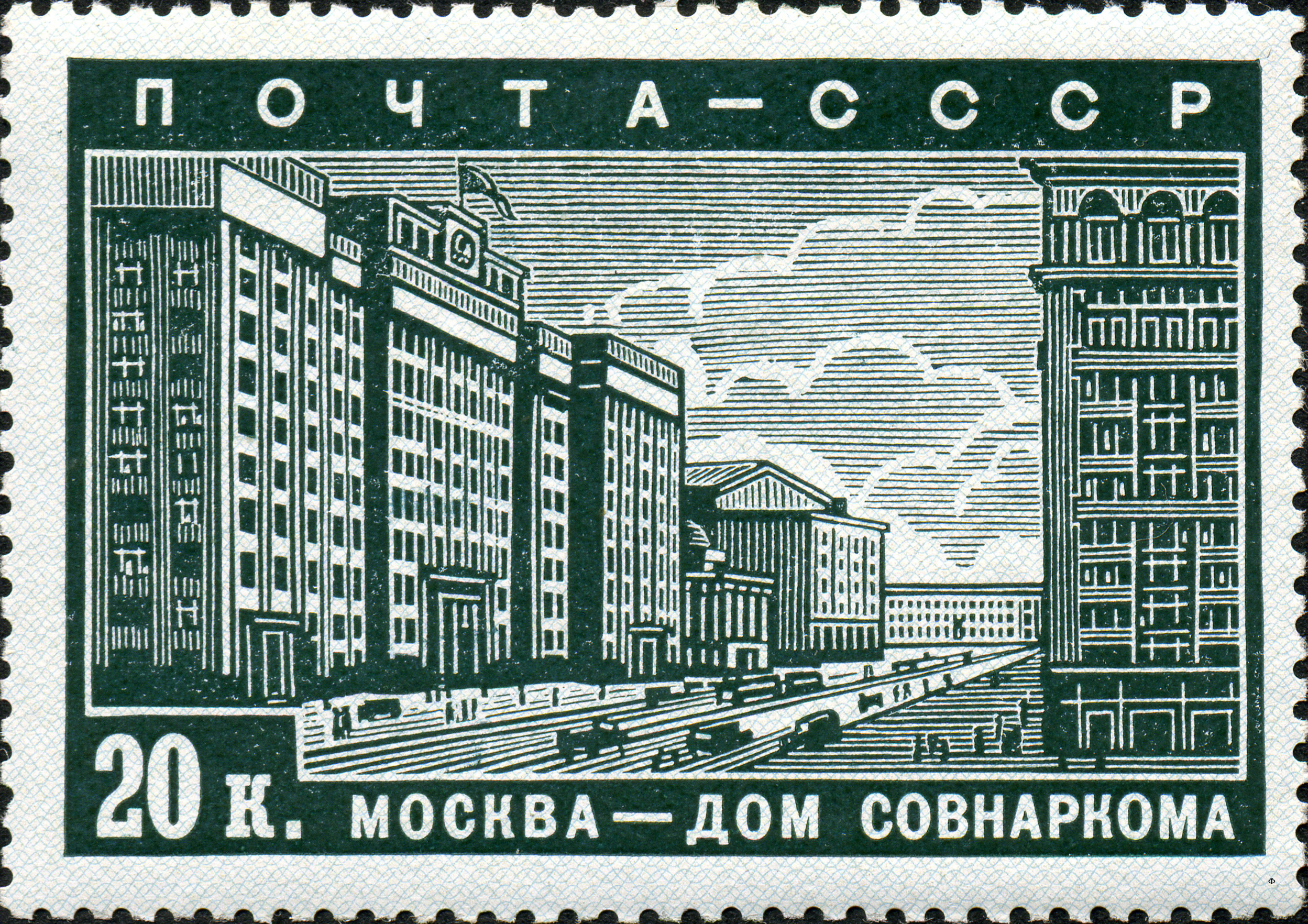
1939 Soviet stamp: "Sovnarkom building"

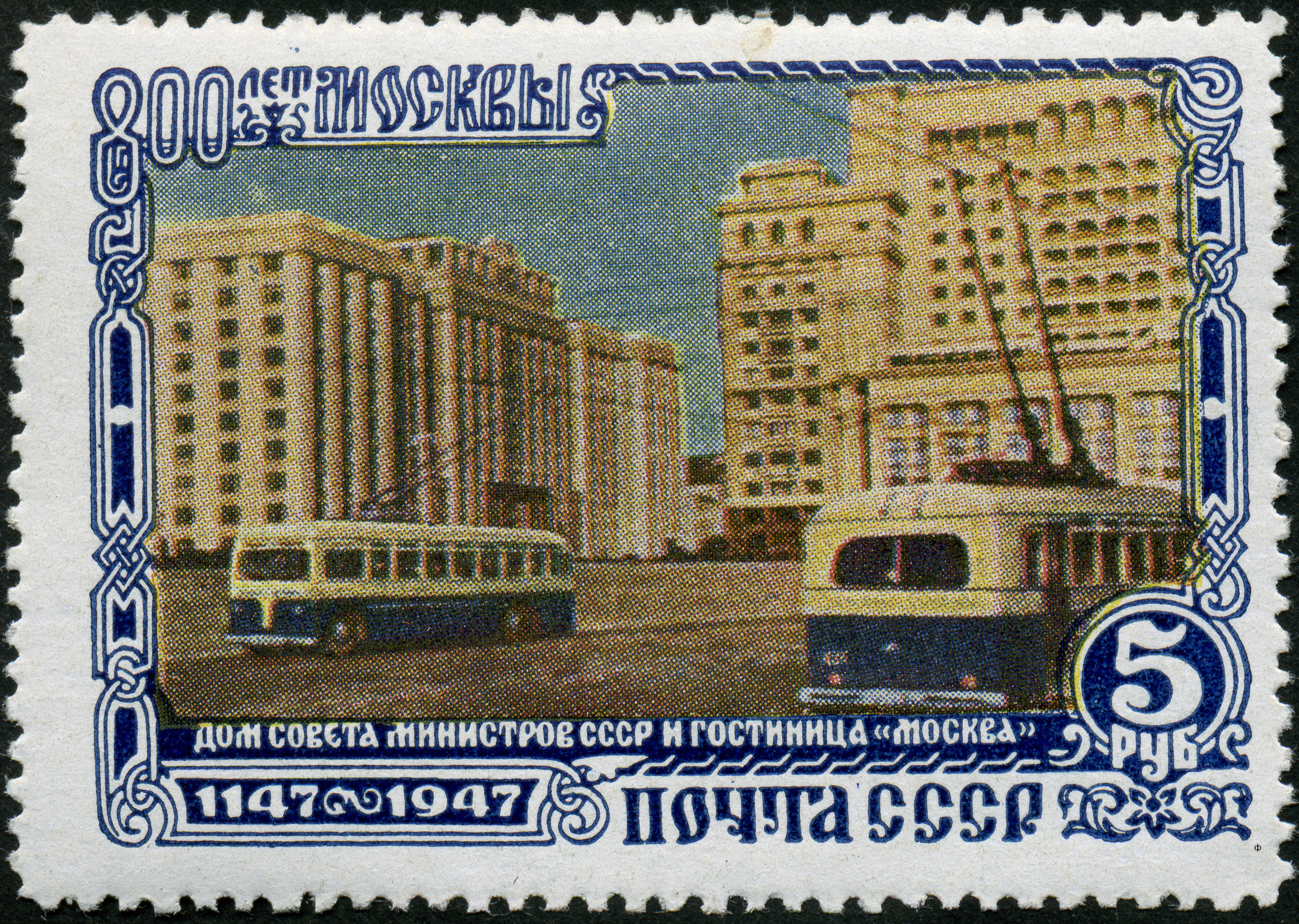
1947 Soviet stamp: "Council of Ministers house and Moskva Hotel"

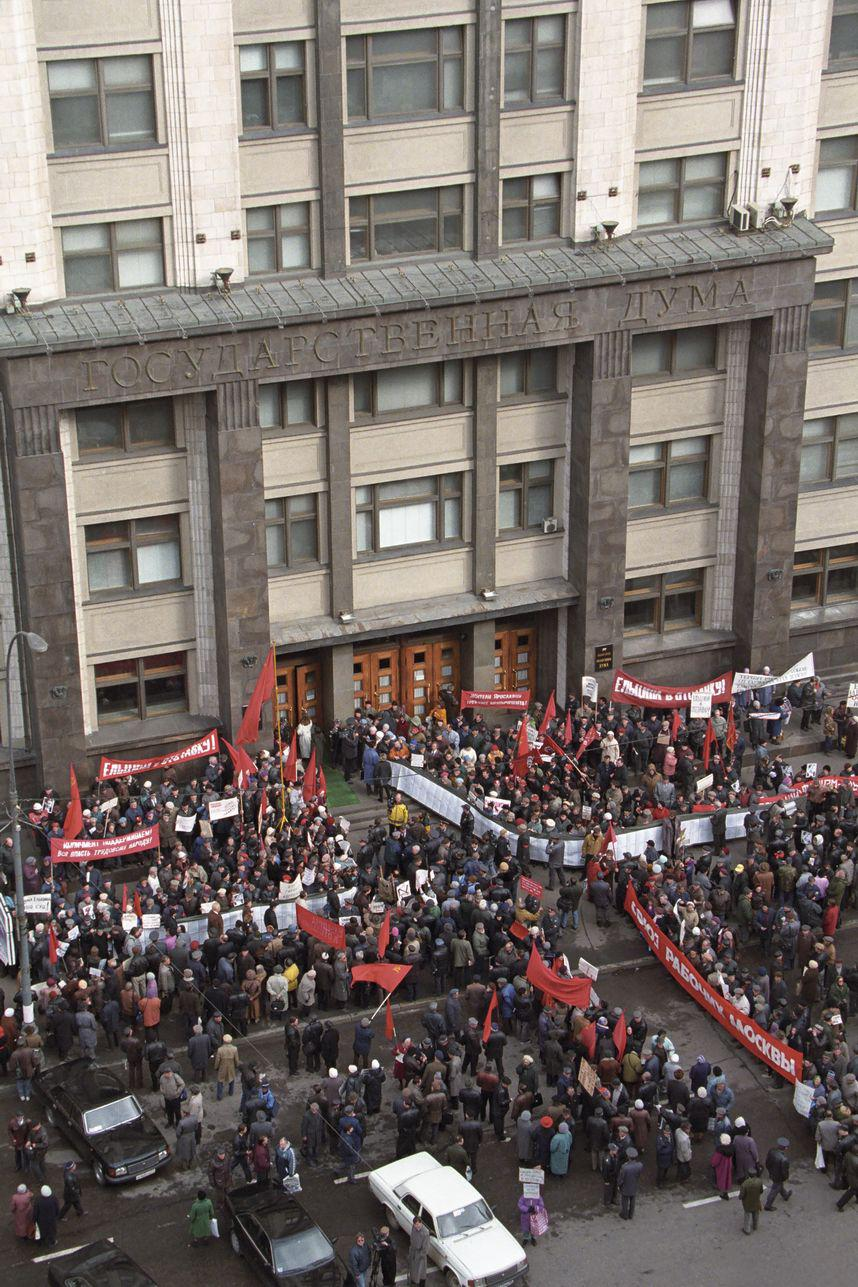
Demonstration for impeachment of Boris Yeltsin, May 1999

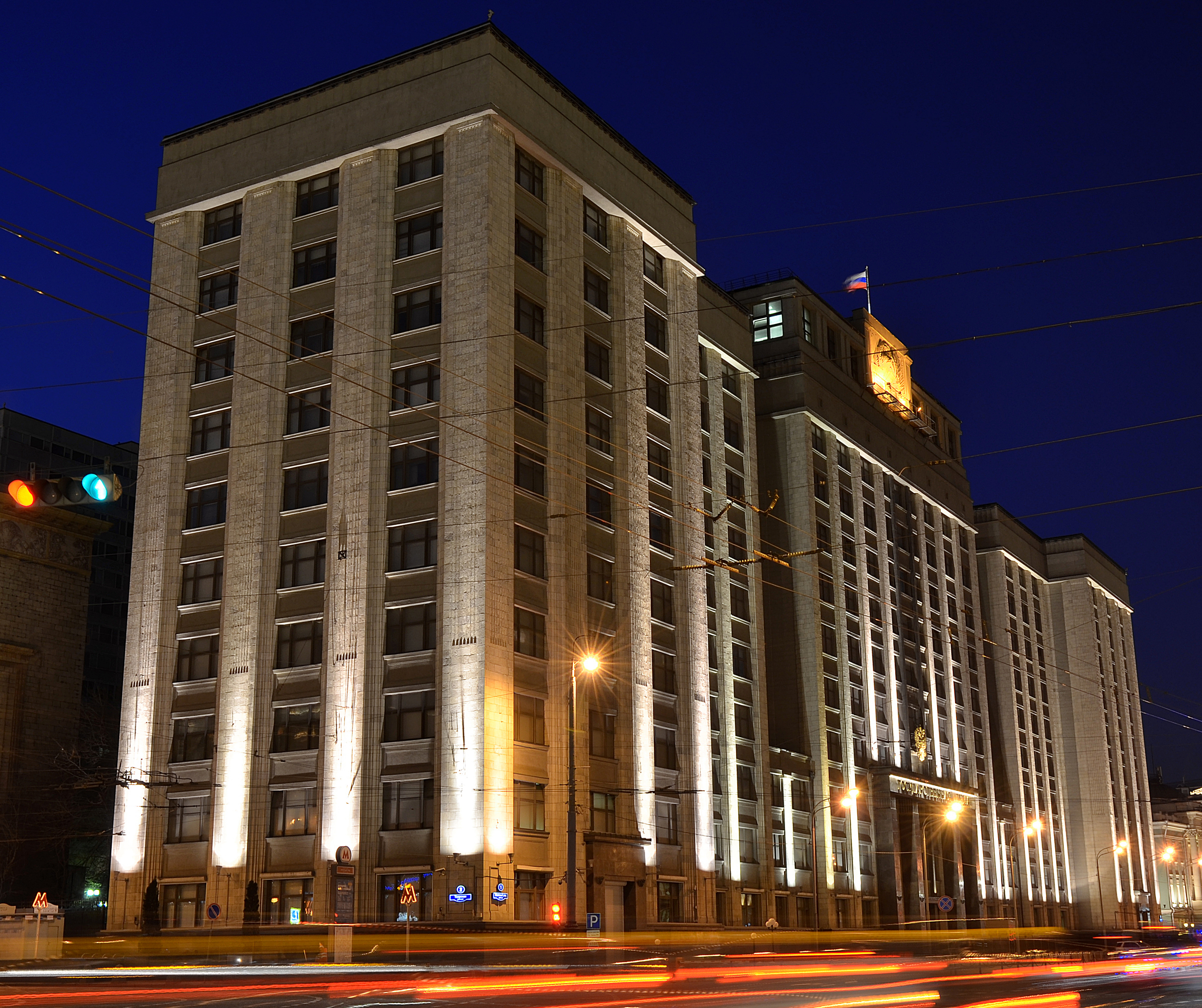
State Duma building at night
