= John Hogshaw =

British Army Brigadier (1896–1968)

Brigadier John Hogshaw CB MC
- Born: 1896
- Died: 1968 (aged 71−72)
- Military career
- Allegiance: United Kingdom
- Branch: British Army
- Service years: 1914–1949
- Rank: Brigadier
- Service number: 10334
- Unit: Royal Northumberland Fusiliers
- Commands: 10th Infantry Brigade; 4th Division; 203rd Infantry Brigade; 134th Infantry Brigade
- Conflicts: First World War; Second World War
- Awards: Companion of the Order of the Bath; Military Cross

Brigadier John Harold Hogshaw, CB, MC (1896–1968) was a British Army officer who briefly commanded the 4th Division during the Second World War.

== Military career ==
After graduating from the Royal Military College at Sandhurst, Hogshaw was commissioned into the Northumberland Fusiliers (later the Royal Northumberland Fusiliers) on 15 December 1914, over four months after the First World War began. He was awarded the Military Cross (MC) for his actions while serving with his regiment's 1st Battalion on the Western Front. The citation for the medal, appearing in The London Gazette in May 1916, reads as follows:

For conspicuous gallantry and ability in handling his machine guns. He got them over very difficult ground in the advance, and by his example and judgement kept his men together and his guns in action under very heavy shell fire.

Hogshaw also served in the Second World War: he became commander of the 10th Infantry Brigade in North Africa in June 1942 and briefly took over command of the 4th Division in North Africa on 22 August 1943 and remained in command until relieved on 4 September 1943. After returning to the 10th Brigade, he went on to command the 203rd Infantry Brigade in August 1944 and the 134th Infantry Brigade in September 1944. After the war he served as Commandant of the British sector in Vienna from December 1946 to November 1949.

Hogshaw was appointed a Companion of the Order of the Bath in the 1948 Birthday Honours.
