= Okhotny Ryad (street) =

Street in Moscow, Russia

Coordinates: 55°45′28″N 37°36′59″E

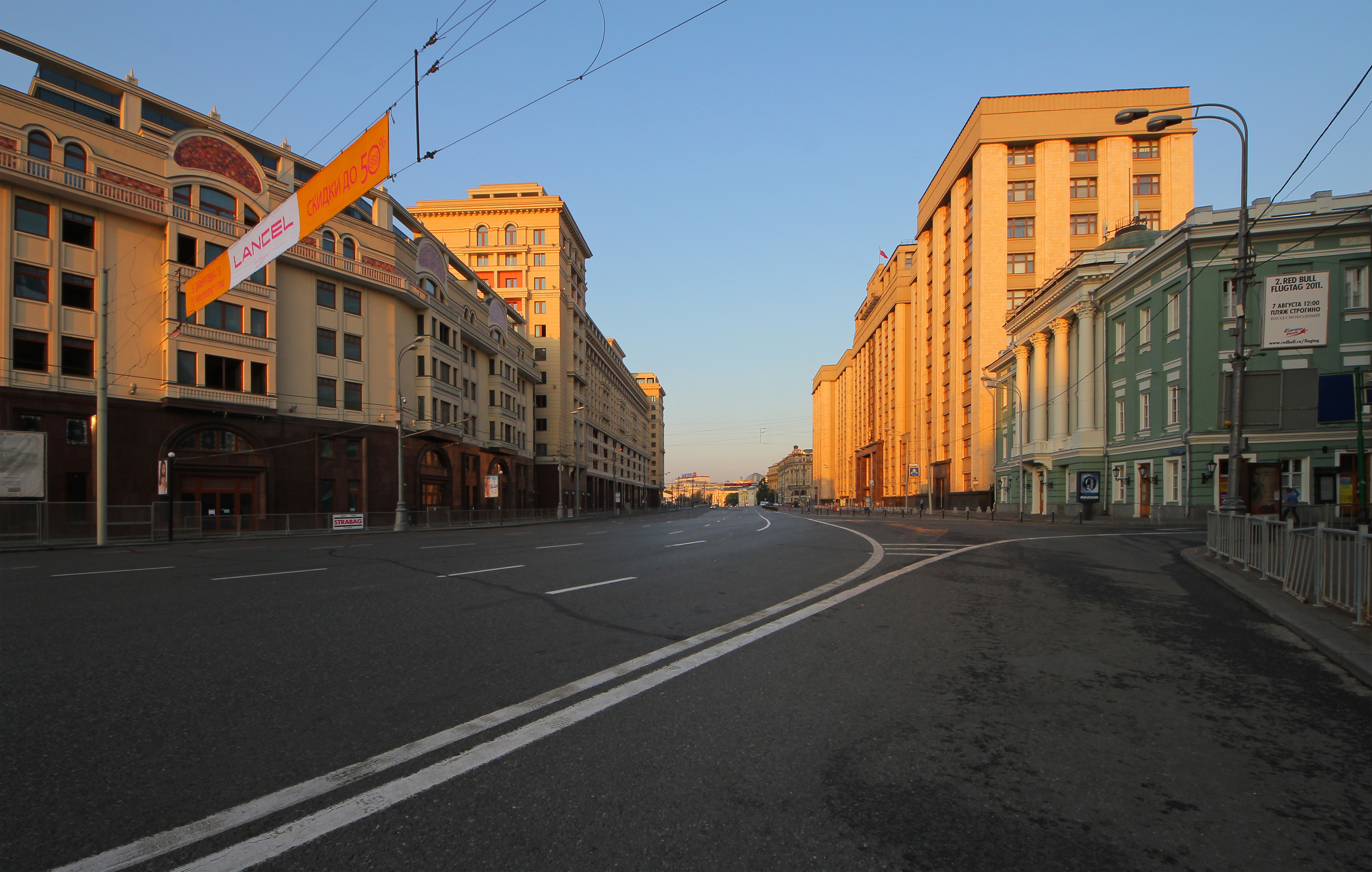
- View of Okhotny Ryad from Theatre Square
- Native name: Охотный Ряд (Russian)
- Length: 0.25 km (0.16 mi)
- Location: Moscow, Russia; Central Administrative Okrug; Tverskoy District
- Nearest metro station: Okhotny Ryad; Teatralnaya

Okhotny Ryad (Russian: Охотный Ряд) is a street located in Tverskoy District of Moscow. It runs from Manezhnaya Square to Theatre Square and it also lies between Georgievsky Lane and Nikolskaya Street. The numbering of houses is carried out from Manezhnaya Square.

== History ==
In the established and, by the 17th Century, traditional structure of the large Moscow market, Okhotny Ryad occupied a very modest place. It was used for trade in "game and live poultry [and] domestic and songbirds" (V. I. Dahl). In the 17th century, Okhotny Ryad was located on the left bank of the Neglinnaya River on the site of the current building of the Historical Museum. In 1708, in connection with the construction of bastions along the walls of the Kremlin and Kitay-Gorod by Peter I, all food rows (Kharchevoy, Obzhorny, Okhotny) were moved beyond the Neglinnaya River – from today's Manezhnaya Square to Teatralnaya Square, next to the Church of Paraskeva Pyatnitsa. After the fire of 1812, stone one-story trading premises with dozens of poultry slaughterhouses were built on the site of the burnt wooden shops. The premises of Okhotny Ryad itself were located opposite the Noble Assembly, but over time the entire Zaneglimensky Market came to be called Okhotny Ryad.

In the second half of the 19th – early 20th centuries, Okhotny Ryad began to symbolize the abundance, hospitality and satiety of Moscow, entering Russian proverbs. However, due to the participation of shopkeepers in attacks on intellectuals and Jews, the image of an Okhotny Ryad resident as a reactionary and pogromist was formed. Since the 1870s, the word "okhotny Ryad resident" has become synonymous with a dark force that suppresses everything progressive. The owners of butcher shops often became voluntary allies of the police during student unrest.

In 1883, a cast-iron chapel of St. Alexander Nevsky was built on Moiseyevskaya Square in memory of those who died in the Russo-Turkish War. Demolished in early November 1922, the chapel became the first Moscow religious building to be destroyed by the Soviet authorities.

In the 1920s, shops began to be torn down in Okhotny Ryad, and in the 1930s, trade was transferred to Tsvetnoy Boulevard, which marked the beginning of the Central Market. In 1928, the Church of Paraskeva Pyatnitsa was demolished, and a little later, the Golitsyn Chambers standing next to it. In 1935, Okhotny Ryad Street appeared on the site of Okhotny Ryad Square as a result of urban development changes. The first metro line in the Soviet Union also passed under it, and a station of the same name appeared.

== Notable buildings ==
Okhotny Ryad is the location of the Building of Council of Labor and Defense, which has housed the State Duma since 1994, having previously housed the Council of Labor and Defense, Council of People's Commissars of the Soviet Union, Council of Ministers of the Soviet Union and Gosplan. The House of the Unions is also located on the corner of Bolshaya Dmitrovka and Okhotny Ryad streets.
