= List of commandants of Vienna Sectors =

This article lists the military commandants of divided Vienna between 1945 and 1955. Following the end of World War II in Europe, the Allies divided Vienna into distinct, occupied sectors, each had its own military governor, often referred to as commandant. This practice ended officially with the Austrian State Treaty, which re-established Austrian independence in 1955, when the respective occupying/protective forces were withdrawn.

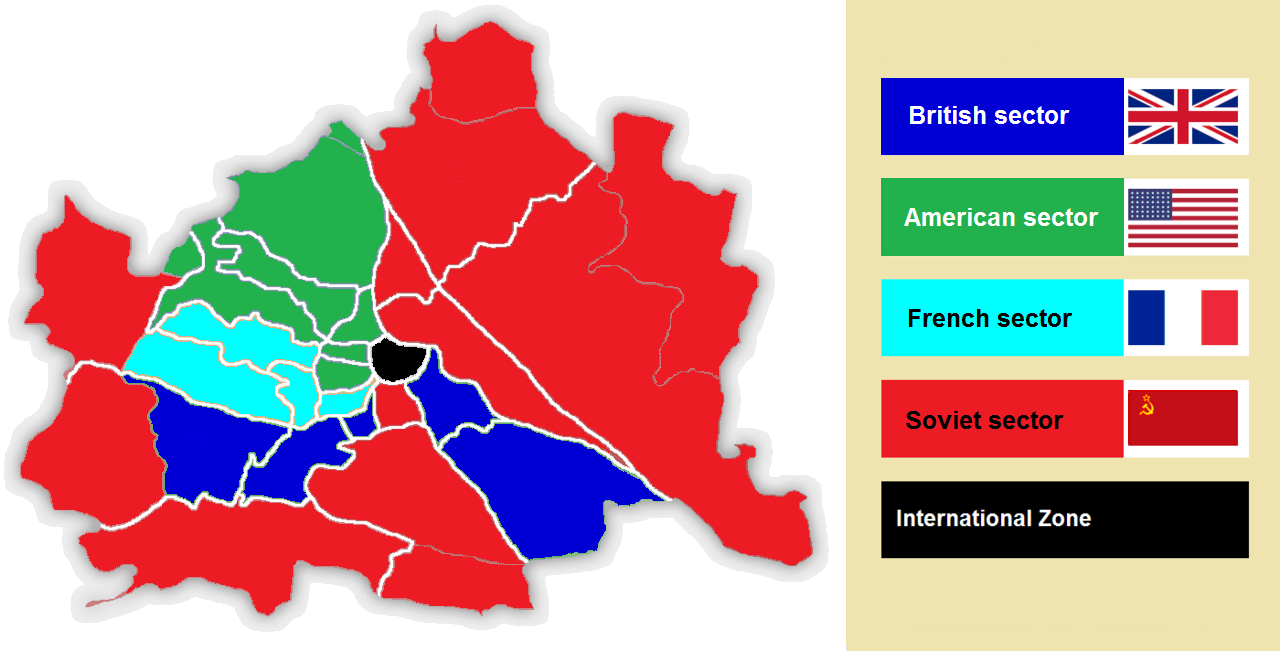
The occupied sectors of Vienna.

== Commandants ==
=== American sector ===
Commandant	In Office
Thomas Edward Lewis	July 1945 – December 1946
Holmes E. Dager	December 1946 – March 1947
Alexander Oscar Gorder	March 1947 – May 1948
Robert T. Frederick	May 1948 – November 1948
Ira P. Swift	December 1948 – January 1951
William Thrower Fitts, Jr.	February 1951 – April 1954
William Henry Nutter	May 1954 – September 1955

=== British sector ===
Commandant	In Office
Godfrey Vaughan Palmer	July 1945 – November 1945
Gerald Lloyd-Verney	November 1945 – May 1946
Stephen Berthold Gordon-Smith	June 1946 – December 1946
John Hogshaw	December 1946 – November 1949
Cyril Knowles	November 1949 – September 1952
Ernest Arthur Howard	October 1952 – September 1955

=== French sector ===
Commandant	In Office
Henri Noël du Payrat	July 1945 – February 1946
Henri Maurice Joppé	February 1946 – July 1949
Pierre Masson	July 1949 – March 1950
Robert Petetin	March 1950 – May 1951
Raoul Daviron	May 1951 – March 1953
Jacques Faure	April 1953 – November 1953
Pierre Olle-Laprune	December 1953 – September 1955

=== Soviet sector ===
Commandant	In Office
Aleksey Blagodatov	13 April 1945 – October 1945
Nikita Lebedenko	October 1945 – May 1948
Dmitry Abakumov	May 1948 – November 1949
Arkady Boreyko	November 1949 – July 1953
Nikolay Molotkov	July 1953 – September 1955

== See also ==
- Cold War
- Allied-occupied Austria
