= Vasily Yevdokimov =

Vasily Pavlovich Yevdokimov
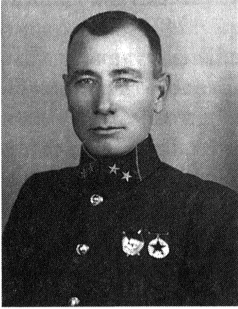
- Yevdokimov, 1940
- Born: 12 April 1898; Bezzubskova, Astrakhan Governorate, Russian Empire
- Died: missing July 1941 (aged 43) Byelorussian SSR, Soviet Union
- Allegiance: Russian SFSR; Soviet Union
- Branch: Red Army
- Service years: 1918–1941
- Rank: Major general
- Commands: 50th Rifle Division
- Conflicts: Russian Civil War; 1920 Ganja revolt; Invasion of Armenia; Invasion of Georgia; World War II; Winter War; Eastern Front (MIA)
- Awards: Order of the Red Banner

Vasily Pavlovich Yevdokimov (Russian: Василий Павлович Евдокимов; 12 April 1898–July 1941) was a Red Army major general.

Yevdokimov ended the Russian Civil War as a junior commander and served with cavalry units in Transcaucasia during the 1920s and early 1930s. He moved to infantry units in the mid-1930s and was decorated for his command of a regiment during the Winter War. Commanding the 50th Rifle Division in Belarus on the outbreak of Operation Barbarossa, he suffered a mental breakdown in early July and was replaced in command. Yevdokimov was escorted to the rear and left in a hospital; his further fate being unknown, he was officially declared missing.

== Early life and Russian Civil War ==
Yevdokimov was born to a Russian working-class family on 12 April 1898 in Bezzubskova, 90 kilometers (56 mi) from Astrakhan, and completed primary school. Drafted into the Red Army in June 1918 during the Russian Civil War, he became a Red Army man in the guard company at Yenotayevka, Astrakhan Governorate, transferring to the Astrakhan Guard Detachment in May 1919. Yevdokimov completed the Astrakhan Machine Gun Commanders' Course between August 1919 and April 1920, fighting in battles against the Armed Forces of South Russia with a detachment from the course. In December 1919 he was concussed in an action at Mikhaylovka.

After finishing the course, Yevdokimov became a platoon commander in the 180th Rifle Regiment of the 32nd Rifle Division before transferring to the 105th Cavalry Regiment of the 18th Cavalry Division of the 11th Army in July. With the latter, he fought in the suppression of the Ganja revolt. In November and December Yevdokimov commanded a platoon of the 1st Armenian Infantry Regiment in the invasion of Armenia, and in February and March 1921 participated in the invasion of Georgia, back with the 105th Cavalry Regiment.

== Interwar period ==
After the end of the war, Yevdokimov completed the Advanced Course for the Command Personnel of the Separate Red Banner Caucasus Army in Tiflis from December 1922 to June 1923, after which he was sent to the 2nd Separate Caucasian Cavalry Brigade of the army. In the following years, Yevdokimov successively served as a platoon commander in the 4th Cavalry Regiment of the brigade and as a machine gun squadron commander in its 2nd Cavalry Regiment. Having completed the Novocherkassk Cavalry Officers Improvement Course between October 1925 and September 1926, he was posted to the 65th Caucasian Cavalry Regiment of the brigade, with which he served as chief of the regimental school and as a squadron commander and commissar. Transferred to the 3rd Caucasian Rifle Division in February 1930, he served with the latter as commander and commissar of its separate cavalry squadron before becoming assistant commander for supply of the 12th Rifle Regiment of the division in June 1932.

Yevdokimov was transferred to the Volga Military District in June 1934, where he commanded the separate reconnaissance battalion of the 61st Rifle Division. Having completed the Intelligence Officers Improvement Course in Moscow between December of that year and November 1935, Yevdokimov rose to command the 182nd Rifle Regiment of the 51st Rifle Division in February 1938 and then its 526th Rifle Regiment from August 1939. Appointed chief of infantry of the 173rd Motor Rifle Division in January 1940, he fought in the Winter War with the division. By then a colonel, he took command of the 490th Motor Rifle Regiment on 10 March 1940, and for "personal heroism" displayed in the fulfillment of the unit objectives Yevdokimov was awarded the Order of the Red Banner. The latter and the Jubilee Medal "XX Years of the Workers' and Peasants' Red Army" were his only awards. He became a major general on 4 June when the Red Army introduced general officer ranks. In August he was appointed commander of the 50th Rifle Division, stationed in Belarus as part of the Western Special Military District.

== World War II ==
After Operation Barbarossa began on 22 June 1941, Yevdokimov's division was moved forward from the front reserve and assigned to the 13th Army on 24 June after the German breakthrough in the Molodechno region during the Battle of Białystok–Minsk. By 27 June his division was tasked with holding a defensive line along the Viliya River until reserves could come up. The 50th was the only organized division left in the region north of Minsk and conducted a fighting retreat to the Berezina in the following days. At the Berezina crossings, they came under air and tank attack on 5 and 6 July, suffering heavy losses.

These experiences resulted in Yevdokimov experiencing a mental breakdown, described in a letter to his widow by regimental commander Colonel Andrey Pavlyga as increasing illogicality in orders and conversations. Pavlyga continued that "within three or four days he [Yevdokimov] became violently insane, getting worse and worse every day." He wrote that Yevdokimov accused his subordinates of treason, brandished his pistol at them, and shot at but missed division chief of staff Colonel Aleksandr Pleshkov, while also wounding a Red Army man. Pavlyga disarmed Yevdokimov and Pleshkov assumed command of the division, detailing men to watch Yevdokimov. Pavlyga's regiment, with Yevdokimov, became separated from the rest of the division in the next several days. At some point between 15 and 18 July, Yevdokimov was left in a civilian hospital at a location between Tolochin and Senno, with Pavlyga writing that the former's behavior had "become unmanageable". Yevdokimov's further fate was unknown and he was officially declared as missing in July.
