= 331st Rifle Division =

331st Rifle Division (August 27, 1941 – July 15, 1945)
- Active: 1941–1945
- Country: Soviet Union
- Branch: Red Army
- Type: Infantry
- Size: Division
- Engagements: Battle of Moscow; Battles of Rzhev; Battle of Smolensk (1943); Orsha Offensives; Operation Bagration; Vistula-Oder Offensive; Battle of Königsberg; Prague Offensive
- Decorations: Order of the Red Banner (2); Order of Suvorov 2nd class
- Battle honours: Proletarian; Bryansk; Smolensk

Commanders
- Notable commanders: Maj. Gen. Fyodor Petrovich Korol; Maj. Gen. Pyotr Filippovich Berestov

The 331st Rifle Division was formed as an infantry division of the Red Army in the summer of 1941, based on a cadre of volunteer workers and reservists from the Bryansk Oblast, and so was known from the beginning as the 331st Bryansk Proletarian Rifle Division. It fought to defend Moscow during the last stages of the German invasion, and then went over to the offensive in early December. It spent much of the next twelve months in the same general area, west of the capital, taking part in the mostly futile battles against the German-held salient at Rzhev. On September 25, 1943, the division shared credit with several other units for the liberation of the city of Smolensk and was given its name as an honorific. The 331st had a highly distinguished career as a combat unit, ending its combat path in Czechoslovakia, advancing on Prague.

== Formation ==
The formation of the 331st Rifle Division began on August 27, 1941, in the Tambov Oblast of the Oryol Military District, under the command of Maj. Gen. Fyodor Petrovich Korol. Korol led the division until February 13, 1942. It was based on the first wartime shtat (table of organization and equipment) for rifle divisions. Its order of battle was:

- 1104th Rifle Regiment
- 1106th Rifle Regiment
- 1108th Rifle Regiment
- 896th Artillery Regiment
- 253rd Antitank Battalion (as of January 2, 1942)
- 298th Antiaircraft Battery (619th Antiaircraft Battalion as of April 20, 1943)
- 508th Mortar Battalion (until October 5, 1942)
- 394th Reconnaissance Company
- 509th (later 612th) Sapper Battalion
- 783rd Signal Battalion (later Company)
- 417th Medical/Sanitation Battalion
- 410th Chemical Protection (Anti-gas) Company
- 397th Motor Transport Company
- 186th Field Bakery
- 756th Divisional Veterinary Hospital
- 1411th Field Postal Station
- 773rd Field Office of the State Bank

October Revolution Anniversary Parade, Red Square, Moscow, Nov. 7, 1941

The division was moved to the Moscow Military District in October where it was assigned to the newly-forming 26th (Reserve) Army, under the Reserve of the Supreme High Command. Some elements of the division entered active service in a highly dramatic manner, by first marching through Red Square in the famous October Revolution anniversary parade on November 7, then straight on to the front lines just 10–15 km away, being assigned to the 20th Army of the Western Front.

== Combat service ==
The division played a vigorous role in the defense of Moscow. Maj. Gen. Leonid Mikhailovich Sandalov, former chief of staff of the 20th Army, inspected the 1106th Rifle Regiment on its arrival in Moscow and noted, "The warmly clothed and adequately equipped sub-units of the regiment made a good impression [on me]." As November moved into December, the 331st, fighting in the area of the Moscow-Volga canal, stopped the enemy advance at Lobnia Station, 25 km from Moscow.

=== Moscow counteroffensive ===
On December 2, as one of the harbingers of the wider counter-offensive that started a few days later, the division took part in a strong counter-attack from the area of Khlebnikovo towards Krasnaia Poliana. Backed by tanks and artillery, the attack made limited gains, but on the 6th it merged with the general offensive, broke into the village with the help of 28th Rifle Brigade, secured it, and took a German 210mm gun, which had been used to shell Moscow, as a trophy. In the next two days the division and the brigade advanced 4.5 km further and completely penetrated the German defenses, but the lack of skis and armor support limited the planned advance of 30 km to only about 10 – 12 km. Nevertheless, by December 20 the division had liberated the town of Volokolamsk.

Following this victory, 20th Army attempted to continue its advance, but had little success until, on December 23, the Army commander was ordered to concentrate on a narrow-front breakthrough near Volokolamsk station and to cease advancing on a broad front. By noon on January 2, 1942, the 331st had captured Khvorostinin, but failed to take Birkino, even with armor support. The latter was finally liberated on the 4th, and by the next day the division was fighting on the outskirts of Posadinki with elements of German 35th Infantry Division.

On January 7, 20th Army was ordered to regroup to carry on the offensive against gradually increasing resistance; by this time General Korol was in command of an ad hoc group which included his own division, along with 40th Rifle Brigade, 31st Tank Brigade, two artillery regiments and the 15th Guards Mortar Battalion. This group was ordered to "destroy the enemy in the area Zubovo - 137-km Station and by the end of the day reach the area Kuryanovo - Vysokovo." The attack was to be supported by a one-hour artillery preparation by a long-range artillery group. The regrouping was completed by January 9, although the 331st was still fighting for Posadinki over these two days. The new offensive began at 1030 hours. on January 10. The forward edge of the German defense was crushed fairly quickly, but only after persistent attacks. Beginning at 1400 the division, backed by 64th Rifle Brigade, waged an unsuccessful fight against two enemy battalions in a wooded stronghold east of Aksenovo. Over the next two days the Germans continued to hold out, while the 331st suffered significant losses until it finally took Aksenovo in the 13th. The next day German forces along the attack sector began falling back towards a defensive line near Gzhatsk. This withdrawal continued over the next ten days, with tired Soviet forces in slow pursuit. The division, "which disposed of an insignificant number of troops", was held back along the line of the Ruza River. Gzhatsk would not be liberated until March, 1943.

The 331st would remain in Western Front until the Front was disbanded. In early 1942 it was briefly transferred to the 5th Army, before returning to the 20th Army, where it remained until March, 1943. General Korol was briefly succeeded by Col. Gavriil Antonovich Kutalev in February, and then by Col. Aleksandr Emelyanovich Kletz in March. On April 10, Col. (later Major General) Pyotr Filippovich Berestov took command and he would hold it for the duration of the war.

=== Operation Mars ===
In the planning for Operation Mars in November, the division was given a leading role in the 20th Army's assault. Alongside the 247th Rifle Division, and supported by the 80th and 240th Tank Brigades, the 331st was tasked to cross the mostly-frozen Vazuza River between Trostino and Pechora, to take German strong points at Zevalovka and Prudy. On the second day, the second German defensive position would be taken. Following this the division would cross the railroad between Rzhev and Sychyovka, and reduce the German strong point at Khlepen. In the event, on November 25, the division successfully forced the river line and took Prudy, but was halted by heavy fire from Khlepen. The 247th had made greater progress and the rest of the 331st reinforced that bridgehead. Overnight, the front commander, General I.S. Konev, decided to try to pass a mobile reserve force through this scant lodgement to complete the breakthrough. The following day the two rifle divisions continued to struggle to expand the bridgehead, but with little success. The tanks and cavalry of the reserve managed to tear a hole in the defenses and get into the enemy rear, but the infantry found it impossible to follow. The gains made by the 331st over the following days were negligible. For most of the remainder of the operation the division held the left flank of its army, recovering from its losses. In the period from November 25 to December 18 the division lost 597 men killed, 1,445 wounded, and 106 missing-in-action, for a total of 2,148 casualties.

=== Smolensk and Orsha Offensives ===
In April 1943, the 331st was transferred to the 45th Rifle Corps in the 31st Army; it would remain in this army for the duration of the war. On June 19 the division was awarded its first Order of the Red Banner, remarkably early in the war for a regular rifle division. Colonel Berestov was promoted to Major General on September 1. During the third phase of Operation Suvorov at 2200 hours on September 24 the 31st Army, led by the 331st, 215th and 133rd Rifle Divisions, began an unusual night assault to break into Smolensk just as it was being evacuated by the bulk of the German forces, which blew up all three bridges across the Dniepr in the process. By 0600 hours on September 25 large parts of the city had been liberated. An advance guard, consisting of the 2nd Battalion of 1106th Rifle Regiment, commanded by Cpt. Prokofii Fyodorovich Klepach, crossed to the south bank of the river and hoisted the Red Banner from the roof of the Smolensk Hotel, one of the few major buildings that avoided German demolitions. Later that day the division was granted the following battle honor:

"SMOLENSK" - 331st Rifle Division (Major General Berestov, Pyotr Filippovich)... The troops who participated in the battles of Smolensk and Roslavl, by the order of the Supreme High Command of September 25, 1943, and a commendation in Moscow, are given a salute of 20 artillery salvoes from 224 guns.

Captain Klepach would further distinguish himself in the fighting for Borisov during Operation Bagration and would be made a Hero of the Soviet Union on March 24, 1945. Through the last years of the war the 331st was designated as an assault division, and eventually earned the moniker of being "the best in the 31st Army".

Following the victory at Smolensk, Western Front was ordered to continue the advance into Belarus with the immediate objective of Orsha. In the event, this goal would only be obtained after nine months of costly fighting. As of October 1 the 331st was serving in 71st Rifle Corps, and it would remain in this Corps for the duration of the war. 31st Army began its attack on October 3. The Army commander, Lt. Gen. V. A. Gluzdovskii, deployed his 71st Corps astride the Smolensk - Orsha highway and the railroad north of the Dniepr River, advancing against the defenses of 197th Infantry Division. 71st Corps had its three rifle divisions side-by-side in first echelon, and was supported by the 42nd Guards Tank Brigade. During three days of heavy fighting the Corps' assault stalled in front of strong defenses which had been reinforced by the 18th Panzer Grenadier Division. However, 36th Rifle Corps managed to unhinge the German defenses north of the highway, and by October 9 the 197th Infantry began falling back, reaching a line from Shcheki on the Verkhita River southward to Novaia on the Dniepr by the 11th. While the advance had been limited, at this point the right wing of Western Front had reached positions roughly 20 km east of Orsha.

A second offensive on Orsha began on October 12. 71st Corps had been regrouped between the highway and the Dniepr, with 42nd Guards Tanks still in support. The assault went in after an 85-minute artillery preparation, but over two days of fighting the 331st, along with the rest of its Army, was stalled without making any significant gains, while suffering serious losses. A third attempt began on October 21, with all three Corps of 31st Army conducting a frontal assault with massed infantry backed by scattered tanks, following an intense artillery preparation; in this effort the 331st was in the second echelon. While again suffering heavy casualties, the Soviet forces smashed the defenses of 197th Infantry Division, and by early evening had penetrated 4 km deep on a front 1 km wide towards the village of Kireevo on the rail line to Orsha, and to Ivanovshchina on the Dniepr. A further attempt to exploit with armor was halted by German artillery. The offensive stalled again the next day.

Another offensive began on November 14. The 331st, with the rest of 71st Corps, was located south of the highway, facing the 35th Panzer Grenadier Regiment of 25th Panzer Grenadier Division. This assault, which continued until the 19th, is mentioned in the 31st Army's history as follows:

"The 31st and 10th Guards Armies undertook yet another attempt to penetrate the enemy's defenses along this axis on 14 November, but unsuccessfully."

Further efforts were shut down until March 1944. General Gluzdovskii received orders to prepare a new offensive on February 27, which was to commence on March 1. Much of his Army was already in action at Babinavichy, so the only forces immediately available on the Orsha axis were the 331st and 88th Rifle Divisions; this left him little choice but to redeploy his 251st and 220th Rifle Divisions south to the rear of the 331st. Since this was the period of the rasputitsa this movement went slowly, and the attack did not begin until March 5. In the end the plan concentrated eight rifle divisions, one tank brigade and two tank regiments against the German 78th Assault Division, backed by roughly 35 tanks (including Tigers) and assault guns. After an artillery preparation of 50 minutes, the 331st, backed by the reinforcing 247th Rifle Division, managed to advance about 1 km and take a strongpoint at Lazyrshchiki, but that was the extent of the gains and the offensive collapsed by March 9, with losses of 1,898 men killed and 5,639 men wounded. During April the STAVKA launched an investigation into the operations, including all six Orsha offensives, of Western Front from October 12, 1943 to April 1, 1944, which reported on April 12. Among other findings it was noted that:

"In 331st and 251st Rifle Divisions, the scouts were repeatedly blown up by their own minefields because they were not shown where they were located."

This was just one of a long list of failures which led to General Gluzdovskii being relieved of command of 31st Army, and Army General V. D. Sokolovskii being removed from command of Western Front, which was then divided into two more manageably-sized Fronts.

== Operation Bagration ==
In April, the 31st Army became part of the 3rd Belorussian Front when Western Front was split up. As part of the regrouping prior to the summer offensive, 36th Rifle Corps was moved to the south bank of the Dniepr, and the 331st was redeployed to that Corps' former sector on the north bank. In the initial stages of Operation Bagration, the Front's immediate objective was, once again, the city of Orsha. The 331st had the direct support of the 959th SU Regiment (SU-76s) for its initial assault; this regiment had been assigned to support of 71st Corps since the beginning of June. In recognition of the 331st's role in the liberation of Orsha on June 27, it was awarded the Order of Suvorov, 2nd Class, on July 2. The division went on to assist in the liberation of Borisov. While two divisions of the 8th Guards Rifle Corps of the 11th Guards Army attacked from the west and north, the 331st drove into the south of the city and it was cleared of German forces by 0300 hrs. on July 1. In the following days it took part in the liberation of Minsk, before joining the general advance to the 1941 Soviet-German frontier. The division was awarded its second Order of the Red Banner on July 23 for the liberation of the Belorussian capital, while on July 3 the 1104th Rifle, 1106th Rifle, and 896th Artillery Regiments were all given the name of the city as a battle honor. In recognition of his successful command of the division in this operation, Major General Berestov would be awarded the Gold Star of the Hero of the Soviet Union on June 27, 1945.

== Into Germany ==
In August, the division received a team of 23 women snipers from the Higher Sniper's School in Moscow. The survivors of this team continued to serve in the division until it was disbanded, although some members were detached to other divisions as conditions warranted.

In the Vistula-Oder Offensive in January 1945, the 3rd Belorussian Front was tasked with driving into East Prussia from the east. The 31st Army was not on an assault sector, and in the first stages it was ordered to hold its positions stubbornly. By January 23–24, the 331st had joined in pursuit of the retreating German forces, and along with its corps helped capture the important road junction of Blenkheim, and the strongpoint of Treuburg on the approaches to Lötzen. However, in the first week of February, the German command had regrouped their 129th Infantry and 558th Grenadier Divisions as well as units of the 24th Panzer Division, which counterattacked in an attempt to encircle units of the 71st Rifle Corps; after several days fighting the attacks were beaten back and the advance resumed towards Kanditten.

Following this, the 31st Army drove towards the Baltic coast. The 331st captured the rail junction of Landsberg from the march, and Berestov ordered the division northward, unaware that it was coming into the path of a powerful German counterstrike to hold open a land link to the rest of Germany. Under pressure, the 331st fell back to the outskirts of Landsberg, and savage fighting ensued. Meanwhile, the German columns led by Waffen SS troops bypassed the town to the south and north, leaving the fighting elements of the division encircled for two days until they were relieved from outside. Meanwhile, the southern German column had rampaged through the mostly-defenseless rear elements of the division, destroying the medical-sanitation battalion, the motor pool, and other units; in total more than 300 men and women were killed and more wounded.

On April 5 the 1106th Rifle Regiment was awarded the Order of the Red Banner for its role in the fighting around Friedland, and the 1104th Rifle and 896th Artillery Regiments received the Order of Kutuzov, 3rd degree, for the same action. Beginning at noon the next day, following a powerful artillery preparation, the 3rd Belorussian Front, including the 331st, began its assault on the fortifications of Königsberg. By the end of the first day, the outer line of defenses had been penetrated, and 102 city blocks had been cleared, and on April 12, the garrison surrendered. Meanwhile, during all the fighting in East Prussia, the division had not been receiving any replacements, so by this time was operating with a far fewer troops than officially authorized, with "regiments" of about 400 infantry, backed by mortars, the artillery regiment, and air support. Upon finally reaching the Baltic several days later, thousands of German soldiers surrendered to just dozens of men of the 331st.

In late April, the division loaded onto troop trains for a trip to the Sudetenland of Czechoslovakia along with the rest of the 31st Army, which was transferring to the 1st Ukrainian Front for the final push to Prague. It disembarked in Saxony on the night of May 6. The army's role was as a flank guard on the left of the 1st Ukrainian Front, protecting the northern prong of the attack on the Czech capital. Advancing against little organized resistance, the 331st was on the outskirts of the town of Schlewitz when it got word of the German surrender.

When the shooting stopped, the men and women of the division had earned the title of the 331st Rifle, Proletarian, Bryansk-Smolensk, twice Order of the Red Banner, Order of Suvorov Division. (Russian: 331-я стрелковая Пролетарская Брянско-Смоленская дважды Краснознамённая ордена Суворова дивизия).

== Postwar ==
According to STAVKA Order No. 11096 of May 29, 1945, part 8, the 331st is listed as one of the rifle divisions to be "disbanded in place". It was disbanded at Friedeberg, Silesia, in accordance with the directive between July 10–15, 1945.
