= Fyodor Korol =

Soviet military commander (1894–1942)

- Native name: Фёдор Петрович Король
- Born: 23 November 1894; Afanasevka, Gadyachsky Uyezd, Poltava Governorate, Russian Empire
- Died: 29 September 1942 (aged 47) near Voronezh, Russian SFSR, USSR
- Buried: Vvedenskoye Cemetery, Moscow
- Allegiance: Russian Empire; Soviet Union
- Branch: Imperial Russian Army; Red Army
- Service years: 1916–1942
- Rank: Major general
- Commands: 331st Rifle Division; 111th Tank Brigade
- Conflicts: World War I; Russian Civil War; World War II; Battle of Moscow; Battle of Stalingrad †
- Awards: Order of the Red Banner

Fyodor Petrovich Korol (Russian: Фёдор Петрович Король; 23 November 1894 – 29 September 1942) was a Red Army major general. Korol was drafted into the Imperial Russian Army and became an officer. He fought in World War I and fought with the Red Army during the Russian Civil War. Korol became a tactics instructor during the interwar period, and became commander of the 331st Rifle Division after the German invasion of the Soviet Union. After leading the division in the Battle of Moscow, Korol became commander of the 111th Tank Brigade. He was killed leading the brigade in late September 1942 on the outskirts of Voronezh by a German bomb.

== Early life, World War I and Russian Civil War ==
Korol was born on 23 November 1894 in the village of Afanasevka near Poltava to a peasant family. In 1913 he graduated from the 4th class school in Romny and became a telegraph operator. Korol was drafted into the Imperial Russian Army on 15 July 1915. In the same year, he graduated from a training course at the Irkutsk non-commissioned officers school. Korol fought in World War I from 1916 with the ranks of second lieutenant, lieutenant, and staff captain. He was sent to the Riga front in early 1916 and served as a company commander there. In August 1917 Korol was wounded and sent to a field hospital for treatment. Korol fought with the Red Army during the Russian Civil War. He fought on the Southern Front of the Russian Civil War against the White Army of Anton Denikin and Pyotr Nikolayevich Wrangel. In 1920, he became a Communist Party of the Soviet Union member.

== Interwar ==
Korol became commander of a rifle regiment after the end of the war. He later became a teacher and from August 1931 was a tactics instructor at the Red Army Military-Technological Academy. From September 1932, Korol became a teacher at the Red Army Academy of Mechanization and Motorization. In 1938, he was promoted to Kombrig. In March 1938, he became a senior lecturer and director of the tactics department. Ivan Chernyakhovsky, Pavel Poluboyarov, and Mikhail Katukov were among his students. In June 1940, Korol became a major general when the rank was introduced.

== World War II ==
After the German invasion of the Soviet Union, Korol became deputy chief of armored forces on the Western Strategic Direction. He was later in the reserve of Western Front's military council. Korol soon became commander of the 331st Rifle Division, which became part of the 20th Army. The division fought in the Battle of Moscow near the Moscow-Volga Canal, where it stopped the German advance at Lobnia Station. On 2 and 4 December, the division counterattacked at Krasnaya Polyana, losing 20 percent of its soldiers and 30 percent of its attached tanks. On 6 December the division attacked Krasnaya Polyana along with the rest of the army, capturing the village in conjunction with the 28th Rifle Brigade. The division helped capture Volokolamsk on 20 December. In the spring of 1942 Korol took command of the newly formed 111th Tank Brigade of the 25th Tank Corps. On 1 September, Korol was appointed commander of 40th Army's armored and mechanized forces, but did not leave the brigade. The brigade fought with the 40th Army in the suburbs of Voronezh and Chuzhevka in late September. On 29 September Korol was killed by a bomb explosion during a German air raid. Korol's body was sent to Moscow and he was interred in the Vvedenskoye Cemetery. In December 2011 a larger monument was placed on Korol's grave.

== Personal life ==
Korol married Olga Nikolaevna and had at least one son.

== Notes ==
Citations
