= Nikita Lebedenko =

Soviet lieutenant general (1899–1956)

Nikita Fedotovich Lebedenko
- Lebedenko, c. 1945
- Born: 28 May 1899; Chaykovka, Kherson Governorate, Russian Empire
- Died: 16 June 1956 (aged 57); Moscow, Soviet Union
- Military career
- Allegiance: Russian SFSR; Soviet Union
- Branch: Red Guards; Red Army
- Service years: 1917–1919, 1919–1952
- Rank: Lieutenant general
- Commands: 91st Rifle Division; 50th Rifle Division; 33rd Guards Rifle Corps; 9th Guards Rifle Corps
- Conflicts: World War I; Russian Civil War; Polish–Soviet War; Winter War; World War II
- Awards: Hero of the Soviet Union; Order of Lenin (2); Order of the Red Banner (6)

Nikita Fedotovich Lebedenko (Russian: Ники́та Федо́тович Лебеде́нко; 28 May 1899 – 16 June 1956) was a Soviet Army lieutenant general and a Hero of the Soviet Union.

== Early life, World War I, and Russian Civil War ==
A Ukrainian, Nikita Fedotovich Lebedenko was born on 28 May 1899 in the village of Chaykovka, Ananyevsky Uyezd, Kherson Governorate. During World War I, Lebedenko was mobilized in the summer of 1917 for trench work in the area of Kartally on the Romanian Front and remained there until November, when he returned home. During the Russian Civil War, Lebedenko joined the Red Guard detachment of Tarasenko, fighting in the region of Tiraspol and Mayaki. The detachment was merged with the Red Army and was reorganized into the 1st Cavalry Battalion in May 1919 and renumbered as the 15th in June of that year. The unit joined the partisan detachment of Grigory Kotovsky in October and was named the 3rd Cavalry Battalion, then the 2nd Cavalry Regiment of the 45th Rifle Division.

As a platoon commander of the 3rd Squadron, Lebedenko distinguished himself in battle on 12 November near Snitkov, Podolian Governorate. Personally leading a counterattack, he managed to break and scatter White cavalry and infantry, preventing the capture of an artillery battery and taking 462 prisoners. For this action, he was awarded the Order of the Red Banner on 31 October 1920. In March 1920, the regiment was redesignated as the 98th Cavalry and became part of the 1st Brigade of the 17th Cavalry Division. With the regiment, Lebedenko led a platoon in the Polish–Soviet War near Olevsk, Novograd-Volynsky, and on the Teterev and Desna. From spring 1921 he temporarily commanded a squadron of the regiment, then designated the 54th Cavalry Regiment of the 3rd Brigade of the 9th Crimean Cavalry Division. It was renamed the 2nd Cavalry Regiment of the Separate G. I. Kotovsky Brigade of the 4th Cavalry Division in September. For distinguishing himself in the battle to destroy a large anti-Soviet force in the Zvizdal region, he was awarded a second Order of the Red Banner on 14 October 1921.

== Interwar period ==
After the end of the war, the regiment was redesignated as the 17th Cavalry Regiment of the 3rd Bessarabian Cavalry Division, and renumbered as the 14th in September 1924. Lebedenko completed the refresher course of the 2nd Cavalry Corps from December 1923 to November 1924, and on his return to the regiment continued to serve as an assistant squadron commander and assistant chief of the regimental school. In August 1925 he entered the Kiev Combined Military School, and upon graduation in August 1927 was appointed chief of the regimental school of the 40th Cavalry Regiment of the 7th Cavalry Division of the 3rd Cavalry Corps of the Belorussian Military District at Minsk. Lebedenko served as commander and commissar of the 41st Separate Reserve Cavalry Squadron from September 1929 and the 36th Separate Reserve Cavalry Squadron from August 1931.

Entering the Frunze Military Academy in September 1931, Lebedenko was appointed commander of the 108th Cavalry Regiment of the Buryat-Mongolian Cavalry Brigade of the Transbaikal Military District upon graduation in April 1936. He commanded the 5th Cavalry Brigade of the district from November 1937. In August 1939 he was appointed commander of the 91st Rifle Division, forming in the Siberian Military District. The division was reorganized as a motor rifle division on 5 January 1940 and sent to the Northwestern Front to fight in the Winter War. Arriving at Luga on 20 February, the 91st crossed the Gulf of Finland and on 29 February attacked Makslahti. The division was withdrawn to the front reserve on 1 March and from 9 March attacked towards Tammisuo as part of the 34th Rifle Corps. Then-Colonel Lebedenko was awarded a third Order of the Red Banner for his leadership of the division on 11 April. After the end of the war, the division was reorganized as a rifle division and returned to Achinsk in the Siberian Military District.

== World War II ==
After Operation Barbarossa began, the 91st joined the 24th Army, forming in the Siberian Military District and went to the front with the army on 15 July 1941. From 21 July it was part of the operational group of Stepan Kalinin on the Western Front, and from 26 July fought in fierce fighting while encircled in Dukhovshchinsky District of Smolensk Oblast. After breaking out of the encirclement, the division became part of the 19th Army and took defensive positions on the Vop 15 km from Yartsevo during the Battle of Smolensk. On 23 September then-Major General Lebedenko handed over command of the division to Colonel Ivan Alekseyevich Volkov, and took command of the 50th Rifle Division on 19 October. At this time, the division was engaged in heavy fighting near Vereya as part of the 19th Army, then retreated to the Protva on the line of Aleksino, Petrishchevo and further to Dorokhovo. Subsequently, the division as part of the 5th Army fought in heavy defensive battles in the Tuchkovo region. During the winter counteroffensive in the Battle of Moscow, the 50th fought in the capture of Tuchkovo and Dorokhovo, launching on offensive towards Mozhaysk and towards Gzhatsk.

Hospitalized for treatment of illness from 13 March to 4 April 1942, Lebedenko returned to command of the 50th after recovering. During this period, the division held defensive positions west of Gzhatsk. In August it transferred to the 33rd Army and successfully acted in the army offensive operation. In early February 1943 the division was shifted to the Southwestern Front and joined the 1st Guards Army, defending on the line of the Seversky Donets. From July, as part of the 33rd Rifle Corps, the division fought in the Izyum–Barvenkovo offensive, the Donbas strategic offensive, and the Battle of the Dnieper. One of the first units to enter Zaporozhye during the Zaporozhye offensive, the division received the name of the city as an honorific on 15 October. Subsequently, the 50th fought in attacks towards Kirovograd, the Kirovograd offensive, and the Uman–Botoșani offensive.

Lebedenko took command of the 33rd Guards Rifle Corps on 13 March 1944, leading it for the remainder of the war. As part of the 5th Guards Army, he led the corps in the final stages of the Uman–Botoșani offensive. In early May the corps and army were relocated to Romania, then from 26 June withdrawn to the Reserve of the Supreme High Command. The corps and army joined the 1st Ukrainian Front on 13 July and fought in the Lvov–Sandomierz offensive. In August, in the region of Baranów, Lebedenko, promoted to lieutenant general, "skillfully organized the repulse of an enemy tank corps counterattack, aimed at destroying the bridgehead on the Vistula. In the course of combat actions, he carried out clear and direct management of elements of the corps and with the attached reinforcements. Boldly applying battlefield maneuvers, he captured separate enemy strongpoints interfering with the advance of our troops in a timely manner." For his actions, Lebedenko was made a Hero of the Soviet Union and awarded the Order of Lenin on 23 September 1944. Subsequently, he commanded the corps in the Vistula–Oder offensive, the Sandomierz–Silesian offensive, the Lower Silesian offensive, the Upper Silesian offensive, and the Berlin Offensive, during which it captured Dębica, Stopnica, Częstochowa, Radomsko, Dresden, and others.

== Postwar ==
After the end of the war, Lebedenko continued to command the corps in the Central Group of Forces. From October 1945, he served as military commandant of the Soviet sector of Vienna. Placed at the disposal of the Commander-in-Chief of the Ground Forces in March 1948, Lebedenko was sent to complete the Higher Academic Course at the Voroshilov Higher Military Academy and upon graduation in April 1949 commanded the 9th Guards Rifle Corps in the Belorussian Military District. Hospitalized for treatment of illness in October 1951, Lebedenko retired on 24 May 1952. He died in Moscow on 16 June 1956.

== Awards ==
Lebedenko was a recipient of the following awards and decorations:

- Order of Lenin (2)
- Order of the Red Banner (6)
- Order of Bogdan Khmelnitsky, 1st class
- Order of Suvorov, 2nd class (2)
- Medals
- Foreign orders and medals
