= Godfrey Palmer (British Army officer) =

British Army officer and rugby union player

Brigadier Godfrey Palmer CBE TD
- Born: Godfrey Vaughan Palmer; 21 February 1900; Steyning, England
- Died: 28 April 1972 (aged 72); Chatham, England
- School: Seafield School
- Occupation: Army officer

Rugby union career
- Position: Wing
International career
| Years | Team | Apps | (Points) |
| 1928 | England | 3 | (6) |

Brigadier Godfrey Vaughan Palmer (21 February 1900 – 28 April 1972) was a British Army officer and England international rugby union player of the 1920s.

Palmer was the son of a Reverend and grew up in Sussex as one of four brothers, receiving his education at Seafield School in Bexhill-on-Sea. He attended the Royal Military College, Sandhurst, and after getting his commission into The Queen's Regiment served in Ireland during the Anglo-Irish War.

Having played rugby at Sandhurst, Palmer spent periods with Harlequins and Richmond, as well as in services rugby. He had been an England reserve on over a dozen occasions before gaining three caps as a wing three quarter in the 1928 Five Nations and contributed two tries in their win over France, en route to them achieving the grand slam.

Palmer took over as commander of the 5th Territorial Battalion in 1937 and was mentioned in dispatches while leading the battalion in France during World War II. In 1941, Palmer took over Chatham Garrison, then in 1943 and 1944 was 6 Base Sub-area commander in Italy. He was Brigadier General Staff, Supply and Relief, following the liberation of Greece, and was commander of the British sector of a divided Vienna in 1945. For his wartime service, Palmer was awarded the American Legion of Merit, CBE, Silver Medal of the Greek Red Cross and Territorial Decoration.

Retiring from the army in 1958, Palmer moved into the private sector and served on a variety of boards. He had a son, Alan, who served with The Queen's Royal Regiment and was killed in the Malayan Emergency.

== See also ==
- List of England national rugby union players
