= Polushkino =

Polushkino Полушкино
- Village
- Location within Perm Krai Location within Russia
- Coordinates: 57°32′N 57°45′E
- Country: Russia
- Region: Perm Krai
- District: Beryozovsky District
- Time zone: UTC+5:00

Polushkino (Russian: Полушкино) is a rural locality (a village) in Asovskoye Rural Settlement, Beryozovsky District, Perm Krai, Russia. The population was 198 as of 2010. There are 2 streets.

== Geography ==
Polushkino is located 33 km southeast of Beryozovka (the district's administrative centre) by road. Samokhino is the nearest rural locality.
