= Makarovo =

Makarovo Макарово
- Village
- Location within Bashkortostan Location within Russia
- Coordinates: 54°13′N 55°45′E
- Country: Russia
- Region: Bashkortostan
- District: Aurgazinsky District
- Time zone: UTC+5:00

Makarovo (Russian: Макарово) is a rural locality (a village) in Tukayevsky Selsoviet, Aurgazinsky District, Bashkortostan, Russia. The population was 9 as of 2010. There are 4 streets.

== Geography ==
Makarovo is located 33 km north of Tolbazy (the district's administrative centre) by road. Andreyevka is the nearest rural locality.
