= Gorbovo, Sosnovskoye Rural Settlement, Vologodsky District, Vologda Oblast =

Gorbovo Горбово
- Village
- Location within Vologda Oblast Location within Russia
- Coordinates: 59°09′N 39°38′E
- Country: Russia
- Region: Vologda Oblast
- District: Vologodsky District
- Time zone: UTC+3:00

Gorbovo (Russian: Горбово) is a rural locality (a village) in Sosnovskoye Rural Settlement, Vologodsky District, Vologda Oblast, Russia. The population was 8 as of 2002.

== Geography ==
The distance to Vologda is 24 km, to Sosnovka is 4.5 km. Stepanovo, Medvedevo, Soroshnevo, Molitvino, Ispravino are the nearest rural localities.
