= Teterino, Sobinsky District, Vladimir Oblast =

Teterino Тетерино
- Village
- Location within Vladimir Oblast Location within Russia
- Coordinates: 56°08′N 40°06′E
- Country: Russia
- Region: Vladimir Oblast
- District: Sobinsky District
- Time zone: UTC+3:00

Teterino (Russian: Тетерино) is a rural locality (a village) in Vorshinskoye Rural Settlement, Sobinsky District, Vladimir Oblast, Russia. The population was 6 as of 2010.

== Geography ==
Teterino is located on the Kolochka River, 33 km northeast of Sobinka (the district's administrative centre) by road. Buzakovo is the nearest rural locality.
