= Margarita Kozhina =

Russian linguist

- Margarita Kozhina
- Born: August 1, 1925; Kyshtym, Chelyabinskaya Oblast', USSR
- Died: August 11, 2012 (aged 87); Perm, Russia

Academic background
- Education: Molotov State University (1971)

Academic work
- Main interests: Linguistics
- Website: M. Kozhina

Margarita Nikolayevna Kozhina (Russian: Маргари́та Никола́евна Ко́жина, Russian pronunciation: [mɐrgɐˈritə nɪkɐˈlaɪvnə ˈkoʐɨnə]) (August 1, 1925 – August 11, 2012) was a Soviet and Russian linguist, Doctor of Philology, professor (1973), Honoured scientist of Russian Federation (1991), the founder of Perm school of functional stylistics, famous both within Russia and abroad, the founder of Russian language and stylistics department at Perm State University.

== Sources ==
- Page, dedicated to Margarita Kozhina, at Perm State National Research University's Official Website.
