= Pyotr Berestov =

Red Army officer (1896–1961)

Pyotr Filippovich Berestov
- Born: December 21, 1896; Berestovo, Syumsinsky District of Udmurtia, Russian Empire
- Died: November 26, 1961 (aged 64); Zaporizhia, Soviet Union
- Burial place: May Cemetery, Kiev
- Military career
- Allegiance: Russian Empire (1917–1918); USSR (1918–1955)
- Service years: 1917–1955
- Rank: Major General
- Commands: 402nd Rifle Regiment; 1st Moscow Peoples' Militia Regiment; 1281st Rifle Regiment; 601st Motor Rifle Regiment; 82nd Motor Rifle Division; 50th Rifle Division; 331st Rifle Division; 72nd Guards Rifle Division; 7th Separate Guards Rifle Brigade; 59th Guards Rifle Division; 43rd Guards Rifle Brigade; 113th Guards Rifle Division
- Conflicts: World War I; Russian Civil War; Polish–Soviet War; World War II
- Awards: Hero of the Soviet Union; Order of Lenin (2); Order of the Red Banner (4); Order of Suvorov, 2nd Class; Order of Kutuzov, 2nd Class; Order of Bogdan Khmelnitsky, 2nd class

Pyotr Filippovich Berestov (Russian: Пётр Фили́ппович Бе́рестов; December 21 [O.S. December 8] 1896, Berestovo – November 26, 1961, Zaporozhye) was a Red Army major general during the Second World War. Drafted into the Imperial Russian Army in 1917, Berestov participated in the Russian Revolution. He was drafted into the Red Army, fighting in the Russian Civil War and the Polish–Soviet War. He became a Red Army officer and served in several positions during the interwar period. Berestov was arrested and released during the Great Purge. He fought in the Winter War as a regimental commander. In the early days after the German invasion of the Soviet Union, he was given command of a People's Militia regiment, which was converted into a regular regiment. Berestov led the regiment in the early period of the Battle of Moscow and transferred to lead a regiment of the 82nd Motor Rifle Division. Berestov became the division's commander and in the spring of 1942 briefly led the 50th Rifle Division. In April, he took command of the 331st Rifle Division, which he led during the rest of the war. For his leadership, Berestov was awarded the title Hero of the Soviet Union in late June 1945. Postwar he commanded the 72nd Guards Rifle Division, which was downsized into a brigade, and the 43rd Guards Rifle Brigade, which became the 113th Guards Rifle Division. Berestov retired in 1955 and lived in Zaporizhia until his death in 1961.

== Early military career ==
Born into a large peasant family of Russian ethnicity in the aptly-named village of Berestovo, Berestov obtained an elementary and some secondary education before going to work at age 14 as a sawyer. In February, 1917, he was drafted into the Imperial Russian Army, just as the Russian Revolution was beginning. He was promoted to the rank of junior non-commissioned officer in the 165th Reserve Infantry Regiment at Simbirsk, and participated in revolutionary demonstrations both there and in Petrograd. In February, 1918, he was demobilized.

Berestov returned home, and worked his father's farm until he was drafted again in November, now into the 38th Rifle Regiment of the Red Army, in the town of Glazov. By 1920 he had taken part in fighting against the forces of A.V. Kolchak, done a course for infantry leaders at Kazan, and served as a machine-gun platoon commander in 4th Rifle Division's 12th Rifle Regiment in the war with Poland. During the war, Berestov became a company commander in August 1920.

== Interwar period ==
Berestov continued his service in the Red Army through the 1920s and '30s. In 1921 he graduated from a battalion commander course held at Vitebsk. In 1924 he graduated from the Higher School of Physical Education in Leningrad. Later that year he was in command of a battalion of the 4th Rifle Regiment. In November, 1930, he moved to a similar assignment the 54th Rifle Regiment of the 18th Rifle Division in Yaroslavl. Late the next year he got his first staff assignment in the same regiment, becoming a logistics officer.

During Stalin's Great Purge in 1937, Berestov fell afoul of the NKVD and was arrested. In the course of his interrogation he had all his front teeth smashed out, all of his toes were broken, and he also suffered a broken rib. In 1939 he was released and rehabilitated, having been vouched for by Gen. S.K. Timoshenko. After his release, in August, 1939, he became head of supply in the newly formed 168th Rifle Division. In December he took command of the 402nd Rifle Regiment in that same division. Wounded in late February, 1940, during the Winter War, he continued in command and was soon awarded his first of four Orders of the Red Banner. On 5 March he was promoted to Colonel. After the end of the war Berestov was sent to the Vystrel courses, from which he graduated in June 1941.

== Second World War ==
In the days after the German invasion, Berestov was appointed commander of the 1st Moscow Peoples' Militia Regiment, recruited from the Leninsky District. Berestov later became commander of the 60th Rifle Division's 1281st Rifle Regiment, leading it at Yelnya and Spas-Demensk. In November 1941, Berestov became commander of the 601st Motor Rifle Regiment. He later became commander of the 82nd Motor Rifle Division, defending the Minsk highway near Kubinka station during the Battle of Moscow. In 1942 he joined the Communist Party of the Soviet Union.

On Mar. 13, 1942, he was named as the commanding officer of 50th Rifle Division, a post he held for less than a month, before being reassigned to command of 331st Rifle Division, where he would continue for the duration. The 331st would compile an enviable record during the rest of the war, mostly as a division of 31st Army, where it became known as "the best of the 31st". On 27 June 1945, Berestov was awarded the title Hero of the Soviet Union for his leadership.

== Postwar service and later life ==
In his postwar service, Berestov moved to command of the 72nd Guards Rifle Division in the Central Group of Forces (Hungary) in July; this division was transferred to Kiev Military District in January, 1946. His next assignment, from May until the end of the year, was as commander of 7th Separate Guards Rifle Brigade. During the whole of 1947 he led the 59th Guards Rifle Division in Odessa Military District. In 1948 he upgraded his command skills at the Frunze Military Academy, graduating successfully. His last assignment was the command of the 43rd Guards Rifle Brigade in the Tauric Military District from December 1948. In October 1953, the brigade was upgraded into the 113th Guards Rifle Division. Berestov retired in December 1955. He lived and worked in the Ukrainian city of Zaporizhia until his death on Nov. 26, 1961. He was buried in the "May Cemetery" in Zaporizhia.

== Notes ==
Citations
