= Gorbovo, Novlenskoye Rural Settlement, Vologodsky District, Vologda Oblast =

Gorbovo Горбово
- Village
- Location within Vologda Oblast Location within Russia
- Coordinates: 59°37′N 39°13′E
- Country: Russia
- Region: Vologda Oblast
- District: Vologodsky District
- Time zone: UTC+3:00

Gorbovo (Russian: Горбово) is a rural locality (a village) in Novlenskoye Rural Settlement, Vologodsky District, Vologda Oblast, Russia. The population was 9 as of 2002.

== Geography ==
The distance to Vologda is 67 km, to Novlenskoye is 7 km. Pavlovo, Kryukovo, Bedrino, Yeremeyevo, Makarovo, Filyutino, Gorka-Ilyinskaya are the nearest rural localities.
