= Teterino, Kovrovsky District, Vladimir Oblast =

Teterino Тетерино
- Village
- Location within Vladimir Oblast Location within Russia
- Coordinates: 56°28′N 41°22′E
- Country: Russia
- Region: Vladimir Oblast
- District: Kovrovsky District
- Time zone: UTC+3:00

Teterino (Russian: Тетерино) is a rural locality (a village) in Malyginskoye Rural Settlement, Kovrovsky District, Vladimir Oblast, Russia. The population was 2 as of 2010.

== Geography ==
Teterino is located 21 km north of Kovrov (the district's administrative centre) by road. Babikovka is the nearest rural locality.
