= Kozhin =

Kozhin (Russian: Кожин) is a Russian masculine surname, its feminine counterpart is Kozhina. It may refer to:

- Alexander Kozhin (born 1990), Russian archer
- Margarita Kozhina (1925–2012), Russian linguist
- Simon Kozhin (born 1979), Russian artist
- Vasilisa Kozhina (c.1780–1840), Russian partisan during the 1812 war
- Vladimir Kozhin (disambiguation)
