= Alt Danzig =

German settlement in present-day Ukraine

Coordinates: 48°26′40″N 32°3′25″E

Alt Danzig was a German settlement in the southern Russian Empire, present-day Ukraine. Its name comes from Danzig, Gdańsk in present-day Poland. Alt, meaning "old", distinguishes this community from Neu Danzig, another German settlement in this area of the Russian Empire. The German colony Alt Danzig also known as Old Danzig, along with the existing local village of Karlovka (Russian: Карловка) were united in Krupskoe (Russian: Крупское) after the October Revolution in Russia.

== History ==
Catherine II of Russia wanted to stabilize the borderlands of the Russian Empire with an agricultural population. To do this she recruited in the Danzig area of Prussia. The immigration agent George von Trappe led the first of the Black Sea Settlers, which consisted of 50 families. He took them first by boat to Riga; they then travelled south to Kremenchuk by wagon. Here the party split and 29 families continued to Elizabethgrad (present-day Kropyvnytskyi in Ukraine). In 1787 they founded Alt Danzig about 15 km to the southwest on land granted to them by Prince Potemkin. By 1803 the settlement had lost 10 families that left due to the hardships involved in learning to farm (they were all previously artisans). This is when 10 new Pomeranian families arrived, whose knowledge of farming proved useful to the community. Several families from Munich arrived in 1841, followed by seven more from Rohrbach in 1842.

Originally Alt Danzig was called "Danzig" but when a daughter colony was established by several Danzig villagers near Mykolaiv, the older village was renamed Alt Danzig and the newer village, Neu Danzig.

== Geography ==
The land around Alt Danzig was high and rocky, making it subject to drought. The community planted a small forest on the side of the river that they owned. The land was suitable for growing grains and potatoes. A profitable water mill was in place by 1848. Cattle and sheep were also raised.

The average annual rainfall in the present-day region is about 475 mm (18.7 in). The 24-hour average temperature in July is 20.6 °C (69.1 °F) and in January it is −5 °C (23 °F).
