= Berestove rural hromada =

Berestove rural hromada Берестівська сільська громада
- Hromada
- Interactive map of Berestove rural hromada
- Country: Ukraine
- Oblast: Zaporizhzhia Oblast
- Raion: Berdiansk Raion

Area
  - Total: 498.7 km^{2} (192.5 sq mi)

Population (2020)
  - Total: 4,468
  - Density: 8.959/km^{2} (23.20/sq mi)
- Settlements: 11
- Villages: 11

Berestove rural hromada (Ukrainian: Берестівська сільська громада) is a hromada of Ukraine, located in Berdiansk Raion, Zaporizhzhia Oblast. Its administrative center is the village of Berestove.

It has an area of 498.7 square kilometres (192.5 mi^{2}) and a population of 4,468, as of 2020.

The hromada contains 11 settlements, which are all villages:

- Berestove
- Hlodove
- Dovbyne
- Kalaitanivka
- Malynivka
- Mykolaivka
- Novoivanivka
- Novosoldatske
- Radyvonivka
- Sachky
- Troitske

== See also ==
- List of hromadas of Ukraine
