= House of the Unions =

Historic building in Moscow, Russia

- Дом Союзов
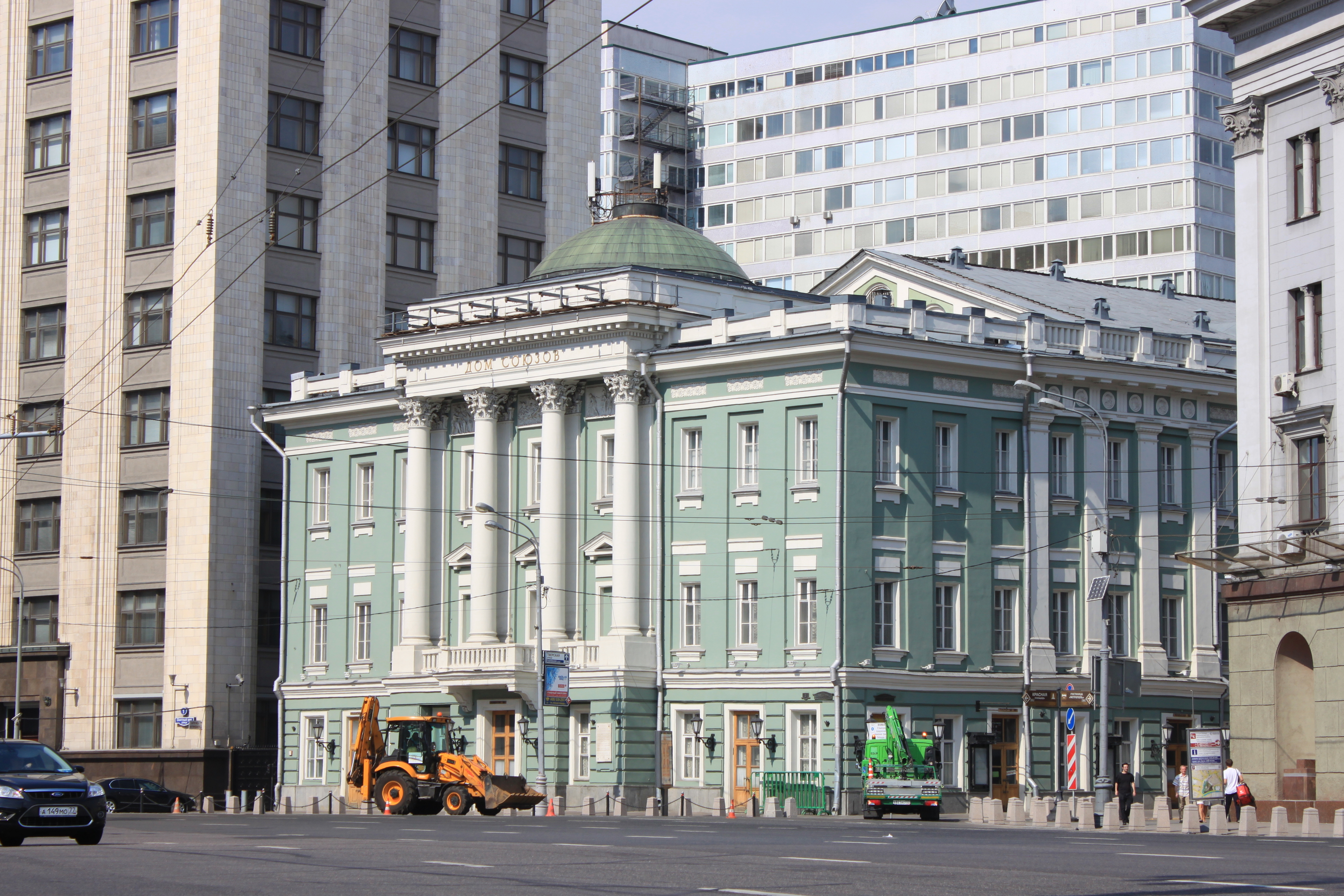
- The building in 2015

- Location within Moscow

General information
- Type: Public
- Architectural style: Classicism
- Location: 1 Bolshaya Dmitrovka Street, Moscow, Russia
- Coordinates: 55.7589°N 37.6164°E
- Completed: 1770s; 255 years ago
- Owner: Government of Moscow

Design and construction
- Architects: Matvey Kazakov, Aleksei Bakarov

The House of the Unions (Russian: Дом Союзов, romanized: Dom Soyuzov, also called Palace of the Unions) is a historic building in the Tverskoy District in central Moscow, Russia. It is situated on the corner of Bolshaya Dmitrovka and Okhotny Ryad streets.

== History ==
The first building on this location was constructed in the early 1770s, and originally belonged to Moscow Governor General Vasily Dolgorukov-Krymsky. In 1784 it was purchased by the Moscow Assembly of the Nobility (Благородное собрание) to serve as a ball venue for the Russian nobility.

=== Soviet era ===
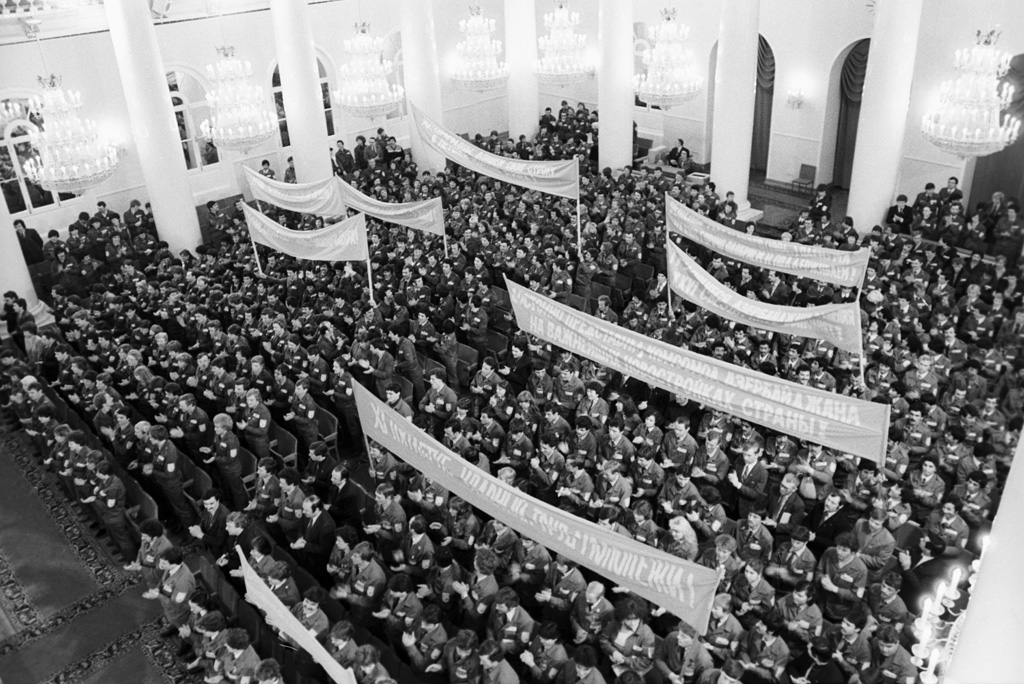
A ceremonial meeting dedicated to the departure of the All-Union Student Strike Force to the country's construction sites, 1974

After the October Revolution the building was assigned to the Moscow Council of Trade Unions, hence its current name.

During the Soviet era, it mostly served as a place for important state events, i.e. housing the Communist Party Congresses and conferences, and governmental award ceremonies, and also as a concert platform for classical and popular music performances, including those by Emil Gilels, Gennady Rozhdestvensky, Klavdiya Shulzhenko and Lev Leshchenko.

Its political significance extended to the state funeral services for high officials and leaders. Vladimir Lenin, Joseph Stalin, Leonid Brezhnev, Konstantin Chernenko, Yuri Andropov, and Mikhail Suslov all had a lying in state in the Pillar Hall prior to their interment in the Kremlin Wall Necropolis on Red Square. Mikhail Gorbachev, the last leader of the Soviet Union, also had a lying in state in the hall following his death in 2022; he was buried at the Novodevichy Cemetery in Moscow next to his wife Raisa, in accordance with his will.

The House of the Unions was also the venue of the notorious 1931 Menshevik Trial and the later Moscow Trials of Old Bolshevik Party leaders and top officials of the Soviet secret police staged in 1936, 1937, and 1938, as well the 1984–1985 World Chess Championship between Anatoly Karpov and Garry Kasparov.

== Architecture ==
=== Pillar Hall ===
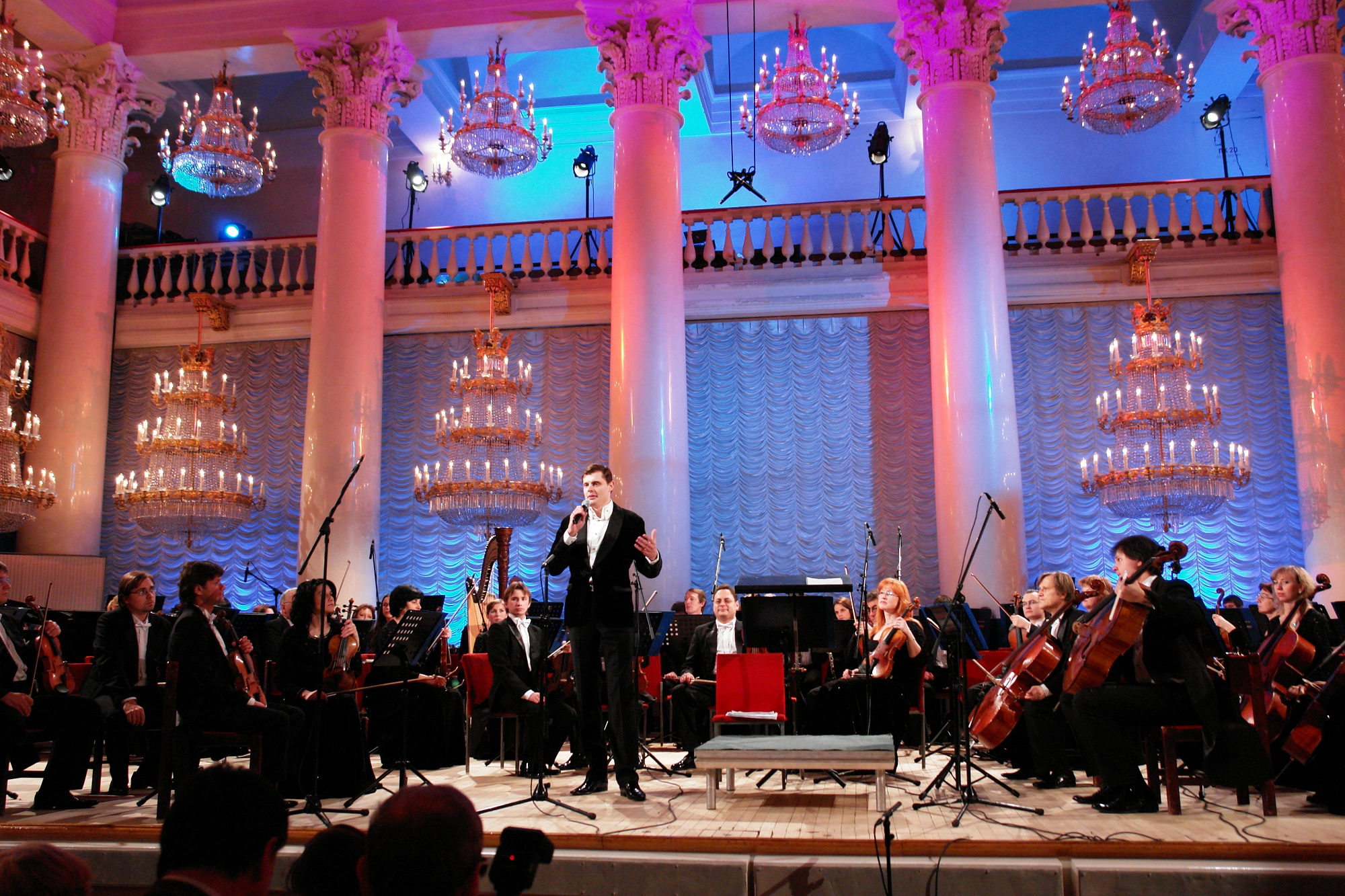
A concert in Kazakov's Pillar Hall

Between 1784 and 1787, the original building was redesigned and rebuilt by Russian architect Matvey Kazakov. In particular, Kazakov added the monumental Pillar Hall (Колонный зал, Kolonnyy zal) in place of the interior courtyard of the building. The hall was named after 28 internal Corinthian columns, all wood with white faux marble finish.

In 1860 Russian Musical Society began a tradition of symphony concerts in the Pillar Hall. Their organizer and conductor was Nikolai Rubinstein.

Today the building's appearance is still very close to Kazakov's original, despite numerous exterior alterations (the last of which was made in 1903-1908).

=== Other halls ===
In addition to the Pillar Hall, the building houses several other large rooms such as the October Hall, Hall No 1 (the Round Hall), Hall No 2 (the Banquet Hall), and numerous lobbies.
