= Bolshaya Dmitrovka Street =

Street in Moscow, Russia

Coordinates: 55°45′45″N 37°36′48″E

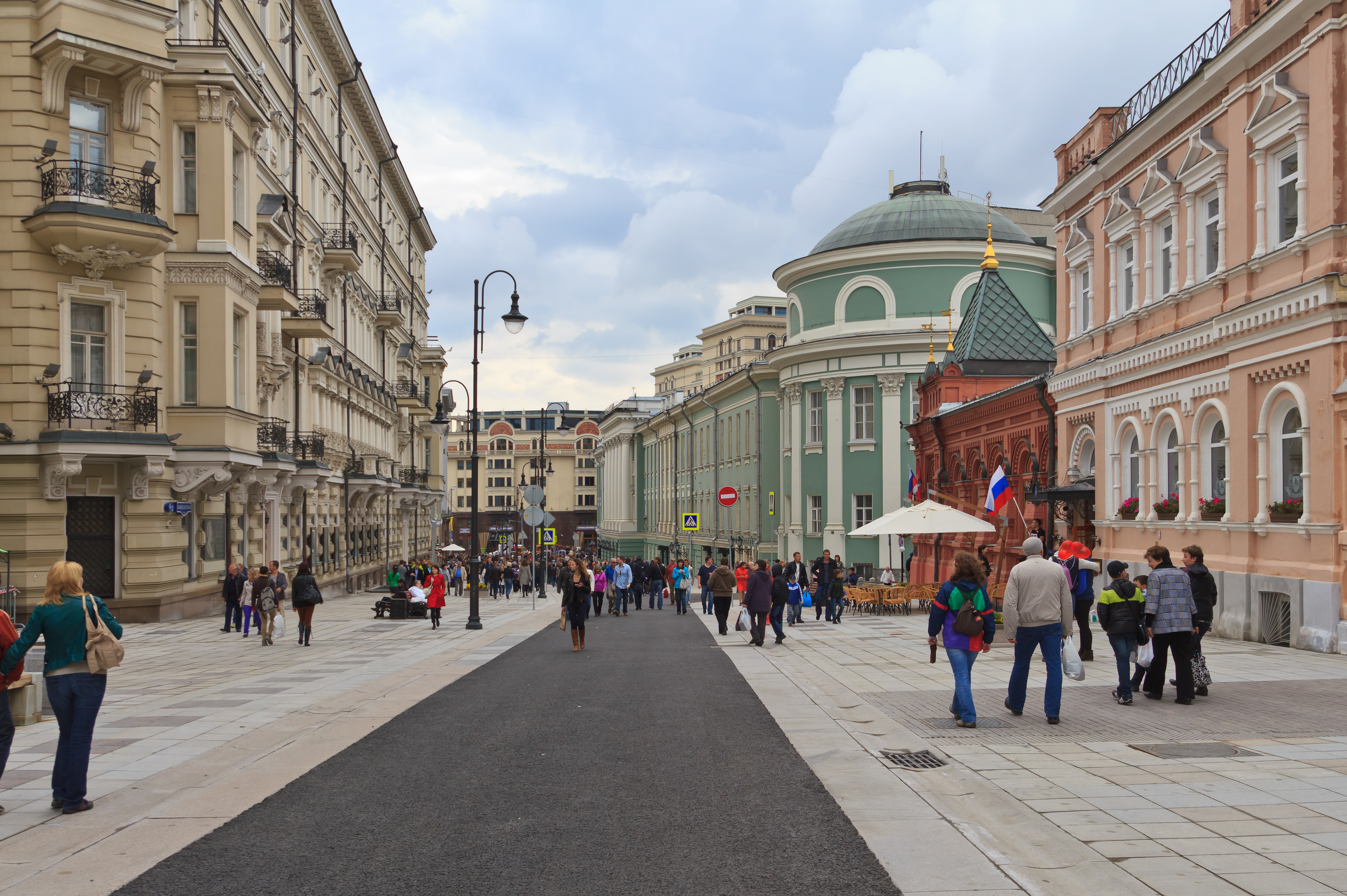
- Bolshaya Dmitrovka Street in 2013
- Native name: Улица Большая Дмитровка (Russian)
- Length: 1 km (0.62 mi)
- Location: Moscow, Russia; Central Administrative Okrug; Tverskoy District

Bolshaya Dmitrovka Street is a street located in Tverskoy District of Moscow. It runs from Okhotny Ryad to Strastnoy Boulevard. The numbering of houses is carried out from Okhotny Ryad.

== Etymology ==
The name has been known since the 14th century. The street is named in reference to the road leading to the city of Dmitrov.

== Notable buildings ==
The House of the Unions is located on the corner of Bolshaya Dmitrovka and Okhotny Ryad streets.
