= Valentin Berestov =

Russian poet and author

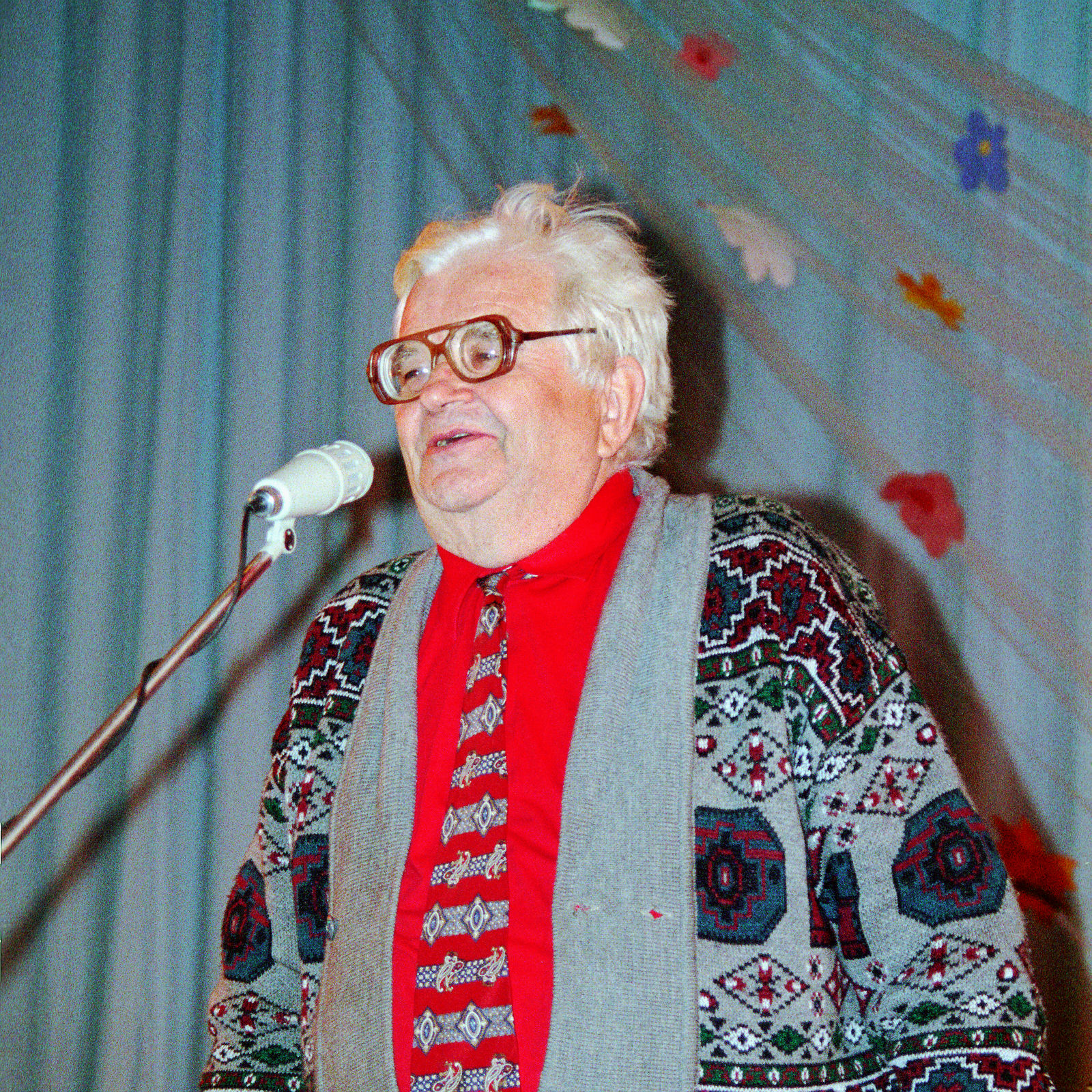
Valentin Berestov in 1996

Valentin Dmitrievich Berestov (Russian: Валенти́н Дми́триевич Бе́рестов; April 1, 1928, in Meshchovsk, Kaluga Oblast — April 15, 1998, in Moscow) was a Russian poet, lyricist, who wrote for both adults and children, translator, memoirist, Pushkin scholar, researcher.

== Biography ==
Valentin Berestov was born on April 1, 1928, in Meshchovsk, Kaluga Oblast. He learned to read at the age of four. In 1942, during World War II, Berestov’s family was evacuated to Tashkent. There, he was lucky to get acquainted with Nadezhda Mandelstam, who introduced him to Anna Akhmatova. Then there was a meeting with Korney Chukovsky, who played a big role in the fate of Valentin Berestov.

His first works were published in the Smena Magazine in 1946. The first collection of poetry 'Departure' and the first children's book for the About the car came out in 1957. Then the readers were acquainted with the collection of poems and tales of Happy Summer, Pictures in puddles, Smile and others.

He was a member of the Union of Soviet Writers. He signed the letter in defense of Yuli Daniel and Andrei Sinyavsky (1966).

In his later years, he wrote and produced children's stories with his wife, artist, and writer Tatyana Alexandrova.

Valentin Berestov is buried at Khovanskoye Cemetery.
