= Teterino, Suzdalsky District, Vladimir Oblast =

Teterino Тетерино
- Selo
- Location within Vladimir Oblast Location within Russia
- Coordinates: 56°34′N 40°30′E
- Country: Russia
- Region: Vladimir Oblast
- District: Suzdalsky District
- Time zone: UTC+3:00

Teterino (Russian: Тетерино) is a rural locality (a selo) in Seletskoye Rural Settlement, Suzdalsky District, Vladimir Oblast, Russia. The population was 35 as of 2010. There are 2 streets.

== Geography ==
Teterino is located 22 km north of Suzdal (the district's administrative centre) by road. Torchino is the nearest rural locality.
