= Aranlı, Bilasuvar =

Aranly
- Municipality
- Azerbaijani: Aranlı
- Location within Azerbaijan
- Coordinates: 39°30′41″N 48°33′54″E
- Country: Azerbaijan
- District: Bilasuvar

Population
  - Total: 539
- Time zone: UTC+4 (AZT)

Aranlı (Aranly, known as Tatyanovka until 1991) is a village and municipality in the Bilasuvar District of Azerbaijan. It has a population of 539.
