= 194th Rifle Division =

194th Motorized Division (September 30, 1939 – May 15, 1940) 194th Mountain Rifle Division (May 15, 1940 – August 26, 1941) 194th Rifle Division (August 26, 1941 - July 1946)
- Active: 1939–1946
- Country: Soviet Union
- Branch: Red Army
- Type: Infantry
- Role: Motorized Infantry; Mountain Infantry
- Size: Division
- Engagements: Winter War; Operation Typhoon; Battle of Moscow; Kaluga Offensive operation Battles of Rzhev; Sevsk-Truschevsk offensive Battle of Kursk; Operation Suvorov; Gomel-Rechitsa Offensive operation Parichi-Bobruisk Offensive operation Operation Bagration; Bobruysk offensive Minsk offensive Vistula–Oder offensive East Prussian offensive Heiligenbeil Pocket
- Decorations: Order of the Red Banner
- Battle honours: Rechytsa

Commanders
- Notable commanders: Col. Ivan Maksimovich Shutov; Col. Mikhail Aleksandrovich Siyazov; Maj. Gen. Pavel Andreevich Firsov; Col. Sergei Ivanovich Iovlev; Maj. Gen. Pavel Prokofevich Opyakin

The 194th Rifle Division was a Red Army division active from 1939 to 1946 under several designations. It was first formed as a motorized rifle division in the autumn of 1939, part of the first group of such divisions created by the Red Army. After brief service in the war against Finland it was moved to the Central Asian Military District where it was reorganized as a mountain rifle division. It was still in this configuration when the German invasion began on June 22, 1941, and it was soon moved into 49th Army of Reserve Front west of Moscow where it was again reorganized as a regular rifle division, based on the shtat (table of organization and equipment) of September 13, 1939, before seeing any combat. When the final German offensive on Moscow began the 194th was caught flat-footed in the process of being transferred by rail behind the front toward Bryansk. As a result its various subunits became separated as they were forced to disembark at several points along the route. Following this split, a lead group of about 4,500 men took part in the defense of Tula, eventually being incorporated into 50th Army's 258th Rifle Division, while the main body remained in 49th Army, defending in the area of Serpukhov. When the winter counteroffensive began on December 6 the first task assigned to 49th Army was to encircle and destroy the German forces between the Upa and Oka rivers. Subsequently, the 194th advanced on Medyn and Yukhnov before the offensive ground to a halt in early March. The division was on the fringes of the battles for Rzhev during the rest of 1942 but only saw action in battles of local significance. In early 1943 it was moved from Western Front to the new Central Front where it took part in the advance on Sevsk, mostly as part of 65th Army. It remained in this Army until after the battle of Kursk, when it was transferred to 48th Army, where it remained for the duration of the war. After advancing through eastern Ukraine the 194th entered eastern Belarus and spent the winter in battles around and west of Gomel, winning a battle honor in the process. In the wake of the German defeat in Operation Bagration the division was awarded the Order of the Red Banner for its part in the fighting for Slonim. It spent the winter along the Narew River, before taking part in the Vistula-Oder Offensive into Poland and East Prussia in January 1945, mostly as part of 53rd Rifle Corps. The division would be transferred in early February, along with its Army and Corps, to 3rd Belorussian Front, and all three of its rifle regiments would be decorated for their parts in the fighting in East Prussia. After the war the 194th was moved, with 53rd Corps, to the Kirov area, and in 1946 it was redesignated as the 40th Rifle Brigade.

== 194th Mountain Rifle Division ==
The 194th Motorized Division was originally formed in September and October of 1939 in the Siberian Military District. After serving briefly against Finland during December 1939 - March 1940, it was moved to the Central Asian Military District and began reorganizing as a mountain rifle division at Tashkent on May 15. As of June 22, 1941, its order of battle was as follows:

- 377th Mountain Rifle Regiment
- 405th Mountain Rifle Regiment
- 470th Mountain Rifle Regiment
- 616th Mountain Rifle Regiment
- 299th Artillery Regiment
- 389th Howitzer Artillery Regiment
- 279th Antitank Battalion
- 179th Antiaircraft Battalion
- 137th Cavalry Squadron
- 158th Sapper Battalion
- 114th Signal Battalion
- 34th Artillery Park Battalion
- 108th Medical/Sanitation Battalion
- 107th Motor Transport Battalion
- 107th Field Bakery
- 487th Field Postal Station
- 213th Field Office of the State Bank

The division was led by Col. Ivan Maksimovich Shutov, who had been in command since October 1940, and would remain in the post until it became a regular rifle division. It had the four rifle regiment structure (without rifle battalions) of mountain rifle divisions, but had several departures from the normal shtat, mostly in regards to the artillery. It appears that the conversion to rifle division standard was already underway.

At the start of Barbarossa the 194th was still located in the Central Asia District near Tashkent as part of the 58th Rifle Corps, which also contained the 68th and 83rd Mountain Rifle Divisions, but it had been detached from the Corps by July 1. It officially began mobilizing to wartime strength on June 23 (all the mountain divisions had about 8,800 personnel and 3,160 horses compared to full complement of 14,100 and 6,740 respectively). Already on June 28 it received orders to move to the front. From July 5 to 14 it moved by rail, first to Kubinka, then to Mozhaysk, where it joined the 49th Army of Reserve Front by July 19.

On August 1 the division was part of the 23rd Rifle Corps of 24th Army in Reserve Front. Some days later the 405th Mountain Rifle Regiment was detached, converted to a regular rifle regiment, and reassigned to the 7th Mechanized Division to convert that division to a standard rifle division. The 954th Rifle Regiment was added to the division to replace the 405th, and finally, on August 26 the 194th was officially redesignated as the 194th Rifle Division.

== 194th Rifle Division ==
Once reformed, the division had the following order of battle:

- 470th Rifle Regiment (from 470th Mountain Rifle Regiment)
- 616th Rifle Regiment (from 616th Mountain Rifle Regiment)
- 954th Rifle Regiment (later 405th)
- 299th Artillery Regiment
- 175th Antitank Battalion
- 137th Reconnaissance Company
- 158th Sapper Battalion
- 114th Signal Battalion (later 29th Signal Company)
- 108th Medical/Sanitation Battalion
- 304th Chemical Defense (Anti-gas) Company
- 401st Motor Transport Company
- 316th Field Bakery
- 385th Divisional Veterinary Hospital (later 705th)
- 487th Field Postal Station
- 213th Field Office of the State Bank

Col. Mikhail Aleksandrovich Siyazov immediately took over command of the division. This officer had been arrested on April 30, 1938 during the Great Purge, but released on April 8, 1940 and reinstated to the Red Army. In August of that year he had been appointed chief of staff of the 194th Mountain Division.

=== Operation Typhoon ===
During August the 194th returned to 49th Army, still in Reserve Front. At the beginning of October, when Operation Typhoon began, it was still under these commands, along with the 220th, 248th and 303rd Rifle Divisions plus the 29th and 31st Cavalry Divisions. The army was occupying a defensive line between Vyazma and Rzhev with its divisions spread along very wide sectors. As an example the 194th was deployed on the banks of the Dniepr from Shabrykino to Sopotov. Owing to the advance of 2nd Panzer Group to the south, which began on September 30, the Army received orders the next day to entrain for redeployment to this sector; the 194th was to begin loading at Semlyovo at 1800 hours on October 2. Meanwhile, the 140th Rifle Division of 32nd Army was to take over its sector. The previous day, Colonel Siyazov had left the division; he would be named commander of the 258th Rifle Division in November. He was replaced by NKVD Col. Pavel Andreevich Firsov, who had been serving as an instructor at the Frunze Military Academy. This officer would be promoted to the rank of major general on January 2, 1942.

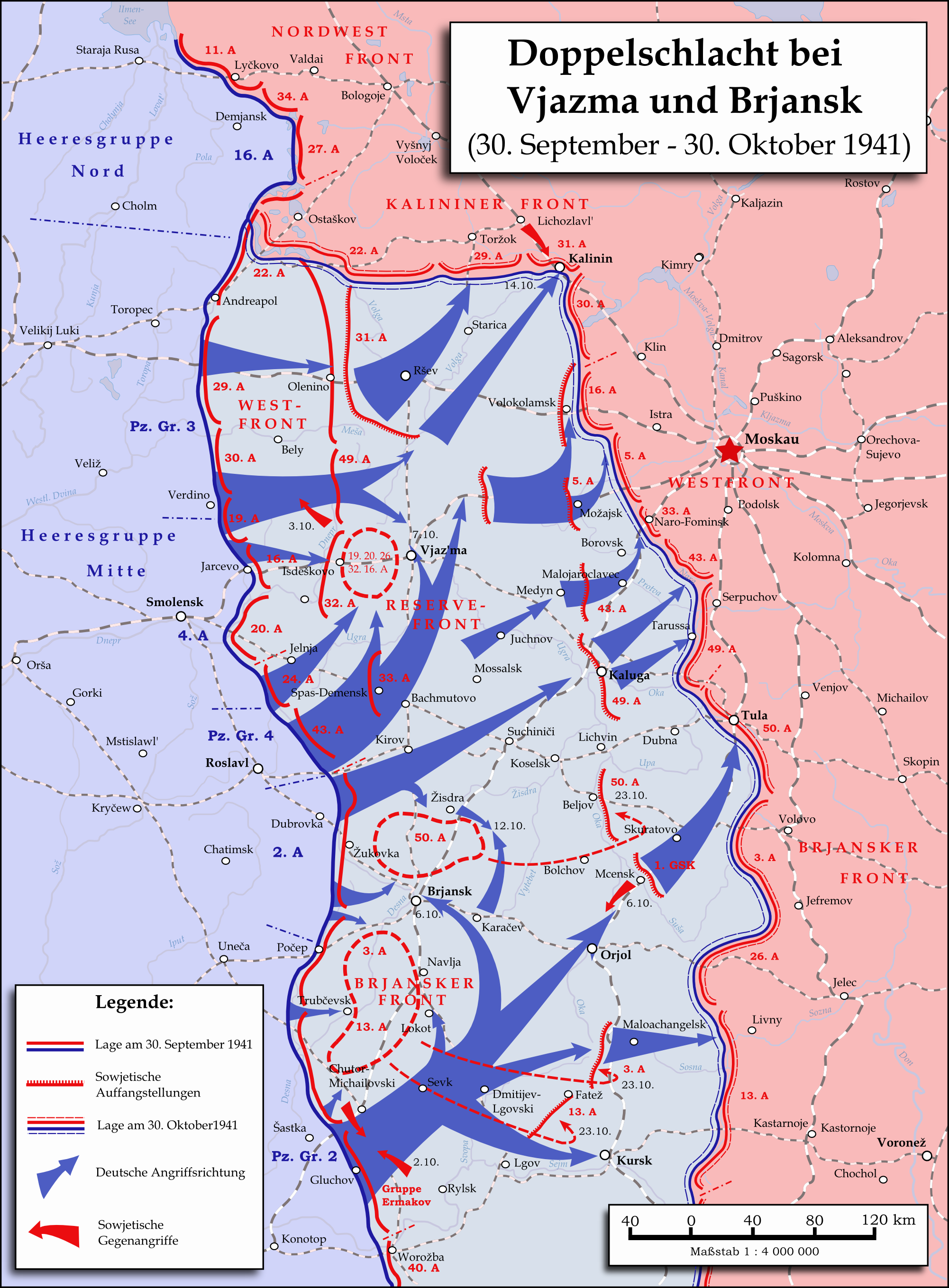
Operation Typhoon. Note positions of Reserve and Bryansk Fronts.

The redeployment plan, which had been prepared as a contingency, was entirely overtaken by events when 3rd Panzer Group began its own part of the offensive on the same day. The redeploying divisions were taken by surprise when German tanks of 6th Panzer Division seized two intact bridges over the Dniepr east of Kholm-Zhirkovskii on October 3. At 0530 that morning the entrained 194th and 303rd Divisions were ordered to concentrate in the Karachev area in the Bryansk Front sector.

2nd Panzer Group's 4th Panzer Division was well on its way to Oryol by midday, and Soviet communications with the city were lost by 1800 hours. Marshal B. M. Shaposhnikov of the STAVKA twice called the headquarters of Bryansk Front, but was only able to speak to the chief of staff, Maj. Gen. G. F. Zakharov; contact with the Front commander, Lt. Gen. A. I. Yeryomenko, had been lost 48 hours earlier. Zakharov asked Shaposhnikov for operational control over the 194th; the first two trains carrying lead elements of the division had arrived in Bryansk. Another 30 trains with the remainder of the personnel and equipment was due to arrive by October 6. Shaposhnikov, more concerned with finding Yeryomenko and putting him in touch with the overall situation, did not give a firm answer. With the fall of Oryol the commandants of railroad stations were given instructions to hasten the movements of the trains of several formations, including the 194th, toward Tula and Kaluga.

At 1835 hours on October 5 the acting commander of Bryansk Front, Lt. Gen. F. A. Yershakov, received approval from the STAVKA for his proposed plan of action. It included withdrawing 50th Army to the second defensive belt west of Bryansk, taking 3rd Army back 35-45km to the Desna River line, while 13th Army would pull back a total of 100-110km. The STAVKA indicated that:

...the general aim of the Front's operations is, first of all, to cut off the enemy that had broken through toward Oryol from their supply sources, and secondly, firmly to keep Bryansk and Karachev in our hands.

Despite the Front's difficult situation, Moscow could not manage to decide on the abandonment of the Bryansk area. The German plan was to encircle the Front with a double envelopment from the north and south. Units of the 108th Tank Division (20 tanks) and the largest part of the 194th were continuing to hold the Karachev area, with their front facing east. The two partial divisions were under command of Lt. Gen. M. A. Reyter, the Front's deputy commander for logistics. This part of the division consisted of the 405th Rifle Regiment, one battalion of the 470th Regiment, two battalions of the 299th Artillery Regiment, plus the anti-tank and anti-aircraft battalions.

Reyter reported on October 5 at 1525 hours that fighting was going on south of Karachev with German tanks and motorized infantry, consisting of up to 40 armored vehicles and two regiments with motorcyclists. The 108th Tanks had already lost four of its own vehicles. The German force was from the 18th Panzer Division and its commander had no intention of getting bogged down in protracted fighting. During the evening, German troops captured the eastern portion of the city; the 194th now took up a defense on the west bank of the Snezhet River, with its front facing east. The panzers continued their main attack to the north and by the end of October 6 had linked up with elements of German 2nd Army in an area southeast of Zhizdra. 18th Panzer also seized Bryansk with an attack from the east. Bryansk Front was now encircled from the rear.

With Yeryomenko still missing and Yershakov out of contact, the STAVKA ordered Maj. Gen. M. P. Petrov, commander of 50th Army, to take acting command. Shaposhnikov directed him, after "having smashed the enemy's Oryol grouping," to take up a line from Mtsensk to Ponyri to Lgov, covering the direction toward Tambov and Voronezh. Oryol fell on October 7. By now, Yeryomenko had turned up at the headquarters of 3rd Army and immediately retook his command, ordering his three Armies, plus Reyter's group, at 1400 hours, to reverse front and fight back through to much the same line given by Shaposhnikov. Group Reyter was to hold a line from Karachev to Naryshkino until October 10 before withdrawing toward Oryol and Zmiyovka, which was clearly no longer possible. Also, there were no practical means to deliver these orders to any but 3rd Army.

The main effort to break out of the encirclement did not begin until October 9, by which time Yeryomenko had extended his control to 13th Army as well. The group of the 194th that had been under Reyter managed to break through to Belyov and then further to Tula. Another group, which had detrained between Sukhinichi and Kozelsk and consisted of one battalion and a regimental gun battery of the 470th Regiment, the 114th Signal Battalion, and the rear units of 405th Regiment, linked up with it at Belyov on October 18. During November, both groups were attached to the 258th Rifle Division and fought under that command for 15 days.

The core of the division (616th Rifle Regiment, one battalion of the 470th, one battalion of 299th Artillery, reconnaissance, sappers and the rear services) was still under 49th Army in Reserve Front and operating on the Kaluga axis. On October 7 it was fighting in cooperation with 31st Cavalry Division, which had failed to occupy Sukhinichi and Kozelsk. These were both seized by German forces on October 8 and 9. Urgent measures had to be taken to form a new defensive front. Army Gen. G. K. Zhukov was taking over command of the Front, and reported to the STAVKA:

1. The enemy in a strength of 50 tanks and 2-3 infantry regiments throughout the day of 10 October attacked from the direction of Yukhnov and attempted to take Medyn.
... An assembly of tanks and 400 vehicles has been spotted 30 kilometres west of Kaluga. Both of these groupings will be struck with aviation on the morning of 11 October.
The 31st Cavalry Division, reinforced with an infantry detachment, will attack toward Kozelsk.

There was not enough strength to create a defense on the Oka River. The next day Zhukov moved to command of Western Front when Reserve Front was disbanded.

== Battle of Moscow ==
Kaluga was captured on October 12, after which 49th Army began withdrawing to the east and northeast. After conducting holding actions on intermediate lines, by October 23 the Army had concentrated; the 194th was on the right flank and had two regiments on the line from Stremilovo to Butyrki to Kalugino to Drakino, covering Serpukhov from the west. The third (incomplete) regiment was in reserve in the Proletarskii area. This sector was close to 35km wide and constituted a screen more than a line, leaving Serpukhov vulnerable. The sector also formed the boundary with 43rd Army to the north. A German breakthrough along this boundary could separate the two Armies and cut the Moscow road, which would threaten the Soviet forces around Tula.

Zhukov and the STAVKA appreciated this weakness in a timely manner. The 7th Guards and 415th Rifle Divisions were transferred to 49th Army from the Reserve of the Supreme High Command, to be followed by several rifle brigades. The Army's right flank and center faced the German 17th, 137th, 260th, and 52nd Infantry Divisions, but these were not particularly active during October 22-23, with small groups, supported by intensive artillery and mortar fire, attempting to cross the Oka in the Aleksin area. All of these were beaten back.

During the next two days the German grouping increased its pressure to push through the boundary, and expanded its crossing efforts to take in the town of Tarusa. While failing again at Aleksin, the attack at Tarusa, supported by aviation, pushed back the 60th Rifle Division and captured the town before continuing toward Serpukhov. This was countered by reinforcements and counterattacks, and during the remainder of October combat on the Army's front was largely positional. During November 1-10 the 194th continued to defend along the line Borovna–east of Kremyonki–Drakino, 10-15km west of Serpukhov.

=== Defense of Tula ===
Previously, on October 29, the roughly 4,500 personnel of the division in the Belyov area were attempting to cover Tula from the west. They were deployed along the line Pavshino–Bredikhino, but then moved forward to the Upa River. This strength was greater than that of most of the nominally complete divisions in 50th Army. Army Group Center was now planning to resume its offensive toward Tula. 2nd Panzer Army was to advance from the south on November 10, take it, and then move east with its main forces. XXXXIII Army Corps was to attack to the northeast, and help encircle the Tula group of forces between the Upa and Oka rivers. This effort was to be directed at the boundary between 43rd and 49th Armies.

To counter this, 50th Army was assigned a series of tasks. During the first stage the detached 194th grouping was to launch a counterblow from the area of Intyushevo and Khlynovo in the general direction of Mikhailkovo, some 2.5km southwest of Tula. This was to be carried out in conjunction with a similar blow by the 413th Rifle Division from the Volokhov area. The attack was to begin at dawn on November 7. Before this could begin there was an increase in German activity on the division's front during the period from November 2-6. On the afternoon of the first date an attack in greater than divisional strength attempted to turn the 194th's right flank, while at the same time frontal attacks tried to gain the eastern bank of the Upa at Pavshino and Voskresenskoe. These attacks were beaten back, but a rifle battalion and two guns were moved up to Ilino to secure the right flank. The next day the 413th arrived and consolidated on its assigned sector.

The counterblow began at dawn on November 7 following an overnight regrouping and a 30 minute artillery preparation. The main forces consisted of the 413th in coordination with the 32nd Tank Brigade, the 260th Rifle Division and the 290th Rifle Division. The 194th and the 258th provided cover for the regrouping. The offensive developed slowly due to active resistance; in addition the 32nd Tanks was late in arriving and its coordination with the 413th was poor. It continued the next day, but still did not yield the expected results.

On November 9, 50th Army was moved from the command of Bryansk Front to Western Front. The next day, 2nd Panzer Army launched its blow against the boundary of 49th and 50th Armies and broke through in the area of Spas-Kanino, advancing in the direction of Kleshnya and Sukhodol. The two Soviet armies were given orders to eliminate the breakthrough by joint flank attacks. This fighting began on the morning of November 12 and soon involved the 258th and the 31st Cavalry. While the breakthrough was not liquidated, the German force was prevented from reaching the Moscow–Tula road and was forced to go over to the defensive on several sectors. The next day the two divisions, plus the attached portion of the 194th, were assigned the task of eliminating German groupings in the Nikulinskie settlements and the White Woods. At 0400 hours on November 15 the village of Yesipovo was retaken, while the 194th fought for Glebovo. This battle continued the next day against strong resistance and counterattacks from the 31st Infantry Division. Not long after this the group of forces of the 194th was incorporated into the 258th.

=== Defense of Serpukhov ===
Meanwhile, west of Serpukhov, Army Group Center was putting together a group of forces with the goal of attacking toward that place as well as Lopasnya in a small-scale pincer action. This was met with a countermaneuver by 2nd Cavalry Corps and the 112th Tank Division. This led to a series of meeting engagements which foiled the German plan but at considerable cost, especially to the 112th's T-26 tanks. On November 28 the 49th Army commander, Lt. Gen. I. G. Zakharkin issued order no. 015, which laid out the Army's defensive posture for the expected last German effort to reach Moscow. The core 194th was to hold the line Borovna–Gurevo–Drakino and prevent a breakthrough by infantry and tanks in the directions of Kremyonki, Pavlovka, Shatovo, and Kalinovo, having prepared strongpoints near Borovna, Kremyonki and Drakino. Front-line defensive works were to be completed by December 1, with second-line works completed four days later. In the artillery plan the 299th Artillery Regiment was to be ready to support a rifle regiment of 60th Division on a crucial sector with no less than two battalions.

On the same day these orders were issued, large German forces, supported by air strikes, resumed the offensive along the 238th Rifle Division's sector. This fighting continued through November 30 without any appreciable German gains. These were reversed on December 1 and from then until December 5 the situation remained stalemated.

=== The Winter Counteroffensive ===
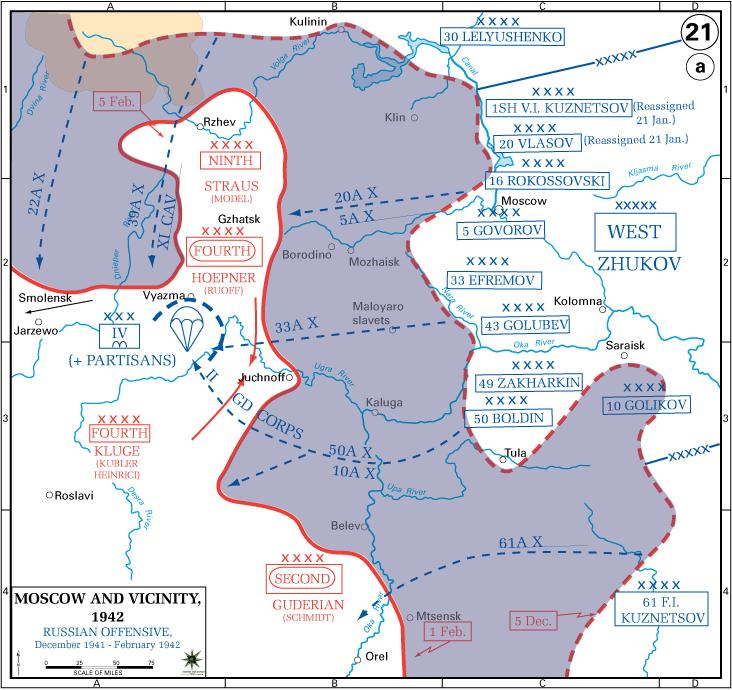
Moscow counteroffensive, December 1941 to February 1942. Note advance of 49th and 43rd Armies. Yukhnov is spelled "Juchnoff".

By now the German forces had exhausted their reserves and most of their supplies while also being increasingly affected by the severe cold. On December 6, the 49th Army had roughly 40,000 men, with 250 field guns, 100 antitank guns, 350 mortars and 40 tanks, making it one of the stronger armies in Western Front. On the same date, General Zhukov launched a counteroffensive against the German shock groups on the flanks. In the course of the first two weeks Zakharkin's troops advanced only slightly from their initial positions from the eastern bank of the Protva River and then along the Oka as far as Sotino, then through Nikulino to the boundary with 50th Army. The first task assigned to the 49th was to encircle and destroy the German grouping between the Oka and Upa Rivers in the Aleksin area. For this purpose two divisions and 20 tanks were transferred from 50th Army.

At the outset the 194th was holding a bridgehead over the Oka centered on Tarusa, facing the 260th Infantry Division, and largely remained on the defensive through December 16. At this point 49th Army went over to the general offensive, launching its main blow with the 194th and 133rd Rifle Divisions, plus four rifle brigades and two tank brigades, in the center. The tank brigades were directly attached to the two divisions, taking orders from the division commanders. The advance was to be in the direction of Saltykovo and Gostishchevo, with the Army's right wing forces launching a supporting attack. The offensive encountered resistance everywhere, particularly along the right flank. The 194th advanced and by noon on December 17 had occupied Novoselki and Yershovo and was fighting for Troitskoe, which had been made into a German strongpoint. This defense was overcome during the morning of December 19 and the division continued in the direction of Gostishchevo.

The defeated German forces along the Protva and Oka began to fall back, for the most part, to the Vysokinichi, Nedelnoe, and Kaluga areas. On December 19, General Zakharkin issued Order No. 018/op, which stated in part:

... the 49th Army, while tying down the enemy along the Burinovo-Maleeva (2km east of Vorontsovka) sector with part of its forces (415th and 5th Guards rifle divisions), is to continue the offensive with the remainder of its formations with the objective of eliminating the enemy's Vysokinichi and Aleksin groups...

The 194th was to operate in the direction of Gosteshevo and Novaya Slobodka, bypassing Vysokinichi from the south and by the end of the day was to take Nikonovo and Karpovo with its main body; meanwhile its forward detachment was to take Novaya Slobodka. In the event, after routing a large unit belonging to the 268th Infantry Division, late in the day and throughout December 20 the division was engaged in fighting for the fortified village of Ostrov, surrounding it from the north and south.

The battle for Ostrov (and Galchatovka, 1,000m to its south) continued into December 22. Zakharkin now adopted new guidelines for the offensive. 50th Army had reached Kaluga, which would be liberated on December 30. This gave him the opportunity to strike deeper with his left flank forces than previously planned, partially encircling the German Vysokinichi group, while the 194th and other center forces continued to carry out their previous missions. In addition, he again ordered that commanders at all levels avoid head-on attacks on fortified positions and seek to bypass them. Using such tactics the 60th Rifle Division captured Vysokinichi on the morning of December 27 following stubborn fighting. At the same time, the 194th, having crossed a wooded area to the south, was developing the offensive in the direction of Ivanovskoe, 3km to the west. Small covering detachments were operating in front of the division. After this, the Army was directed to attack in the direction of Detchino and Kondrovo and west, aiming for the German Myatlevo–Kondrovo–Yukhnov grouping, in cooperation with 50th and 43rd Armies. Throughout this period, both sides were slowed by heavy, drifting snow.

As the offensive continued into January, 1942 the 49th and 50th Armies were to continue in Yukhnov direction, which provided the shortest routes to Roslavl and Vyazma. Army Group Center attached great significance to retaining Yukhnov and had concentrated parts of eight divisions along a 75km front. By December 31 the 194th had overcome the German mine obstacles and covering detachments and reached the line Kanshino–Vasilchinovka; it would subsequently continue to attack to the west. On January 4, in cooperation with the 415th Division, it reached the line Afonasovo–Starosele, having captured those points. The next day, Zhukov subordinated the 194th to 43rd Army, where it operated on its left flank.

==== Medyn Operation ====
By January 5 it was clear that the most powerful German group facing the left flank of Western Front was the one in the Kondrovo–Yukhnov–Medyn area. If this could be rapidly defeated the road to Vyazma would be opened. According to Front directive No. 269 of January 9 this would be the objective of 43rd, 49th and 50th Armies, as well as 1st Guards Cavalry Corps. 43rd Army was specifically instructed to defeat the German forces in the Myatlevo–Voronki area no later than January 11 and then assist 49th Army with the destruction of those forces around Kondrovo. It would then attack in the general direction of Ugryumovo station, outflanking Gzhatsk from the west. For the operation the 194th would have the 18th Tank Brigade in support. Altogether, taking into account preceding losses, the five divisions and two tank brigades of the Army had roughly 15,000 riflemen, 400 machine guns, 100 mortars of all calibres, 50 artillery pieces, and up to 40 tanks. This worked out to about 600 rifles and proportionate numbers of arms per kilometre of front, quite small for a breakthrough of a fortified zone. However, the German XX Army Corps, with remnants of 29th Motorized and 10th Panzer Divisions, were demoralized to a significant degree, striving to simply win time to evacuate their rear echelons before continuing to retreat under cover of rearguards.

43rd Army's drive on Medyn began on January 10, jumping off from a line along the Luzha River. Almost immediately a gap began to develop to its north where the 33rd Army was fighting in the Vereya area. To address this, the 194th was force-marched all the way from the 43rd's left to fight flank to the area Aleksandrovka–Kolodesi–Sorochino. From here it was to move to the Shanskii Zovod to engage and destroy a number of small German groups along the Shanya River. This was to secure the flanks of both armies. While the division redeployed the remainder of the 43rd continued to advance on Medyn. The town was encircled on January 13 and overnight the garrison withdrew in small groups; some of these ran into the forward detachment of 5th Airborne Corps and were killed or captured, while others managed to escape toward Myatlevo.

==== Advance to Yukhnov ====
The Army commander, Maj. Gen. K. D. Golubev, issued his Order No. 50/op on January 15 which laid down the next tasks:

The 43rd Army, for the purpose of defeating the enemy's Yukhnov group, is to bypass the enemy's main centers of resistance along the Medyn'-Yukhnov highway on 16 January and through a flank attack is to support the 49th and 50th armies' units in destroying the enemy's Yukhnov group.

The 194th, which had reached the Shanskii Zavod and cleared it, received orders to attack to the southwest in the direction of Yukhnov, with the goal covering the maneuver toward Myatlevo. It began moving the same day. On January 16, overcoming insignificant resistance, one rifle regiment occupied Iznoski, another took Bekleshi, and the third Domantsevo. The next day, while pushing back small German groups, the regiments pushed on to Izvolsk, Tetevo, and Iznoski.

The attack continued on January 18-19. By 1500 hours on the latter date one regiment had captured Pupovka, another blockaded Khvoshchi, while the third was approaching Bolshoe Semyonovskoe. As it moved, General Firsov was forced to leave a rifle battalion each in Kuzovo and Izvolsk to guard against contingencies. It reached Yukhnov in a weakened state. On the same day Firsov was wounded and hospitalized. After his recovery about a month later he took command of the 49th Rifle Division before becoming deputy commander of 6th Army. He was leading the 26th Guards Rifle Corps on April 6, 1945, when he was made a Hero of the Soviet Union. He continued to command the Corps postwar and was promoted to the rank of lieutenant general. After serving as an instructor and in several staff positions he retired in October 1952. He died in Moscow on February 15, 1964. Col. Sergei Ivanovich Iovlev, another NKVD officer, took over the 194th on January 20. He had served in the Winter War, and had led the remnants of his 64th Rifle Division from near the frontier back to Soviet lines near Bely during Operation Barbarossa. He had commanded three other divisions, most recently the 1st Guards Motor Rifle Division, before being appointed to the 194th.

On January 20 the German forces began more serious efforts to break through the developing encirclement in the Yukhnov area. Large numbers attacked the division near Pupovka, while also pressing against the units of 50th Army southwest of Yukhnov. The German goal was to hang on to the Warsaw–Moscow highway and cover the flank being attacked by 43rd Army. The division was forced to abandon Pupovka and to organize a defense along the line from Prisele to Kunovka. Having a local superiority in forces, German troops were breaking out and falling back to the west in small groups. In order to complete the mission it was necessary to take Myatlevo as quickly as possible, and this was carried out by the 415th and 1st Guards Motor Divisions on January 29. These units immediately pursued along the Warsaw highway, but ran into strong resistance in the Voronki area, which effectively brought the Medyn-Myatlevo operation to a halt.

The fighting for Yukhnov continued through February, during which time both sides were severely depleted. The town was finally liberated on March 5, and roughly half of the defenders were killed or captured while breaking out of the encirclement. In late February the 194th returned to 49th Army, where it remained until October. Earlier in February the 33rd Army had been encircled near Yukhnov, and throughout March, in accordance with orders from the Front, the 43rd, 49th and 50th Armies fought to relieve the pocket but the general exhaustion of the Red Army after months of counterattacking, plus the onset of the spring rasputitsa, doomed these efforts to failure. In early April the 33rd was finally authorized to withdraw through forests under partisan control in the direction of Kirov, a distance of up to 180km. Only a few thousand men managed to filter out to friendly lines.

Although plans were made for 49th Army to take a role in the summer offensives around the Rzhev salient these proved abortive. The 194th spent the summer and fall holding its lines on the salient's southeastern shoulder, rebuilding from the winter battles. Colonel Iovlev was relieved on October 8 for "inaction and insufficiently demanding command" and appointed deputy commander of the 19th Rifle Division. Before taking up this post he was reassigned to take command of the Vadinsk Partisan Group behind German lines, and later led the 215th Rifle Division, being promoted to the rank of major general January 27, 1943. Col. Pavel Prokofevich Opyakin took over the 194th on October 10. He had been in command of the 99th Rifle Division shortly after the German invasion and had briefly been a PoW before escaping. He would remain in command into the postwar, being promoted to major general on September 13, 1944.

== Sevsk-Truschevsk Offensive ==
Later in October the division left 49th Army and came under direct command of the Front. In November it was reassigned to 5th Army, still in Western Front. At about the time Operation Mars was grinding to a halt the division was moved to the Front's 31st Army, which had suffered heavily in the offensive, but it arrived too late to take part in the fighting, which ended on December 18.

In January, 1943 it returned to the Front reserves. On February 5 the STAVKA issued a decree to create the new Central Front under command of Col. Gen. K. K. Rokossovskii as of February 15. The new Front was partly made up of forces of his disbanded Don Front that were freed up with the German surrender at Stalingrad, but it also incorporated forces from other Fronts, such as the 194th, that were currently undeployed. Rokossovskii in turn ordered that his Front's 2nd Tank Army concentrate in the Dolgoye region by February 12. This Army, to which the 194th was soon assigned, was to launch an offensive in the general direction of Sevsk and Unecha Station beginning on the morning of February 15, with the immediate objective of cutting the Bryansk–Gomel railway.

Despite strenuous efforts to ensure timely regrouping and concentration of Central Front's forces into their assembly areas and jumping-off positions for the offensive, persistent poor weather and deteriorating road conditions caused delay to February 25. The advance of Army Group South toward Kharkiv was an additional complication. The division was ordered to conduct a reconnaissance by fire along the Pervomaiskii and Polozovka (15km northeast of Dmitriev-Lgovskii) on the morning of February 23. This led to a heavy and complex five-day struggle for the German defense line covering that town, which also involved the 60th Rifle Division and the 16th Tank Corps.

On March 8, Rokossovskii issued revised instructions to his armies, including the 2nd Tank and 65th:

3. The forces of the 65th and 2nd Tank Armies will continue the offensive swiftly, with the intermediate missions - to destroy the enemy in the Dmitrovsk-Orlovskii, Lokot, Igritskoe, Ugreevichi, and Kuznetsovka region, and subsequently attack toward the northeast and north.

Upon arrival along the Gremuchee, Nikolaevskoe and Brasovo line the 194th was to be withdrawn into the Front reserve. On March 11 it was reported that the infantry formations of 2nd Tank had suffered up to 40 percent casualties in 15 days of offensive combat. By March 14 the division had reached just south of Litizh, but stalled there as German 2nd Army went over to the counteroffensive. It was able to hold its positions through the next 10 days its advance was over. Shortly after this the 194th was sent to Lt. Gen. P. I. Batov's 65th Army in the same Front.

== Into Ukraine and Belarus ==
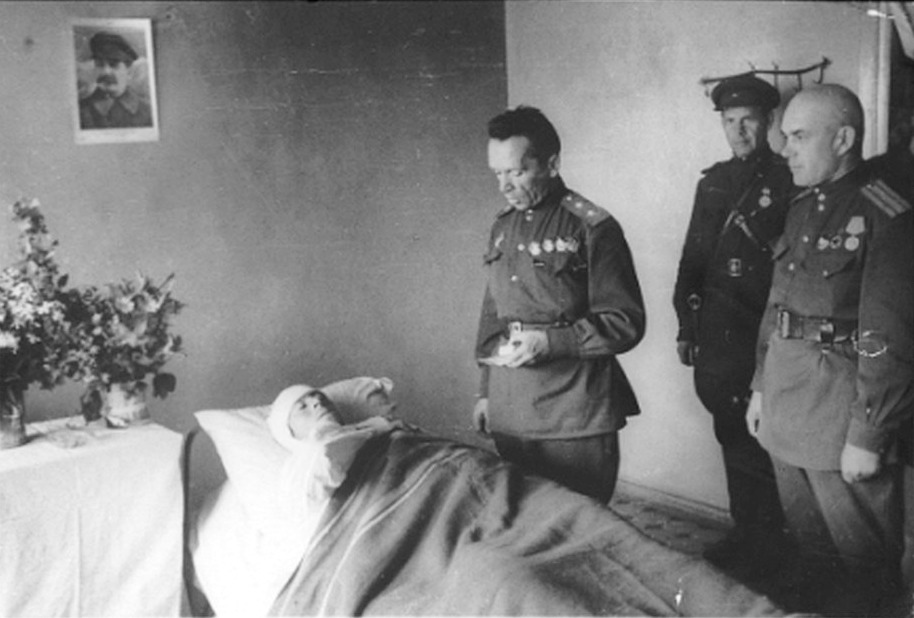
65th Army commander Pavel Batov awards the Order of the Red Banner to rifleman Red Army man Nikolay Golubyatnikov of the 616th Rifle Regiment in a hospital, 4 July 1943

At the outset of Operation Zitadelle the 65th Army was deployed on an 82km frontage along the western face of the Kursk salient between the 60th and 70th Armies of Central Front and facing the German XIII Army Corps of 2nd Army. In the German plan for the operation no attacks were to be made on this sector. 65th Army had nine rifle divisions, with six, including the 194th, in first echelon, and the remaining three in second echelon.

In the event the 65th Army did not join the summer offensive until Operation Kutuzov was nearly concluded and Operation Polkhovodets Rumyantsev was well underway. Central Front struck 2nd Army's center at Sevsk and east flank at Klintsy on August 26. By the beginning of September the 194th had been transferred to 48th Army in the same Front. It would remain in this Army for the duration of the war. The Front's forces quickly broke the German line with 60th Army in the lead. On September 2 the XIII Corps was ordered to fall back to the west and maintain contact with Army Group South, but instead was pushed south across the Seym River into the 4th Panzer Army sector, thereby opening a 30km wide gap between Army Groups South and Center. The following day, 2nd Army withdrew to the Desna River as General Rokossovskii paused to regroup. On September 9 the Front's forces forced this river south of Novhorod-Siverskyi and at Otsekin.

Central Front liberated Nizhyn on the Oster River on September 15, which finally triggered the OKH to order a full withdrawal to the Dniepr. Over the next five days the Front staged a two-pronged thrust northward on either side of Chernihiv which collapsed the flank of 2nd Army, allowing it to advance north toward Gomel.

=== Gomel-Rechitsa Offensive ===
48th Army, commanded by Lt. Gen. P. L. Romanenko, closed up to the German defenses at Gomel from the east and south on September 29-30. He arrayed his five divisions under direct Army command in an arc extending from Dobrush along the Iput River for some 25km to where it entered the Sozh River. The Army largely faced the XXXV Army Corps. During the first two weeks of October, Rokossovskii launched his first attempt to seize Gomel and advance on Rechytsa, but this was unsuccessful. For the second attempt he called for the formation of three shock groups on Central Front's right wing (48th, 65th and 61st Armies). These were to attack on October 15 in the direction of Babruysk and Minsk. The first of these included seven divisions from 48th Army and four from 65th Army. The 194th, along with the 102nd and 307th Rifle Divisions, were to regroup in order to act as the follow-up force. They were moved into a bridgehead over the Sozh south of Gomel as part of a large regrouping within the Front. In the event, this effort made little more progress than the first attempt.

On October 20, Central Front was redesignated as Belorussian Front. Rokossovskii planned for a renewed offensive to begin on November 10. Over the first ten days of the month the Front carried out another regrouping to continue the offensive and encircle and destroy the German Rechytsa-Gomel grouping. By this time the 194th had been assigned to 42nd Rifle Corps, which also included the 307th and 399th Rifle Divisions, and the Corps was moved to a bridgehead over the Dniepr south of Loyew. The Corps deployed in first echelon assault positions in the 5km-wide sector between the village of Bushatin and the Dniepr and were backed up by two other divisions in the Corps' second echelon.

In three days of fighting, beginning on November 10, the forces of 48th and 65th Armies managed to tear a gap 15km wide and from 8–12km deep in the German defenses, and were halfway to Rechytsa. Over the next four days, 42nd Corps helped drive XXXV Corps back into Rechytsa, and on November 18 the German forces evacuated the city, crossing to the east bank of the Dniepr under pressure from the Corps and 1st Guards Tank Corps to the north. The division was recognised for its part in this victory with an honorific:

RECHITSA - ...194th Rifle Division (Colonel Opyakin, Pavel Prokofevich)... By order of the Supreme High Command of 18 November 1943 and a commendation in Moscow, the troops who participated in the battles for the liberation of Rechitsa are given a salute of 12 artillery salvoes from 124 guns.

Army Group Center's southern defenses were in a state of crisis by this point, and 9th Army had been forced out of Gomel. As the German retreat continued, 42nd Corps also crossed the Dniepr and linked up with the rest of 48th Army. Along with a small group from 1st Guards Tanks the 48th joined the advance of 11th and 63rd Armies, which were pursuing the XXXV Corps as it withdrew from Gomel. By November 30 the combined armies had pushed the Corps westward and northwestward to the Klenovichi–Potapovka line, 25km southeast of Zhlobin.

=== Parichi-Bobruisk Offensive ===
With the fall of Gomel, Rokossovskii saw the next objectives of his center armies as Parichi and Babruysk to the northwest; the terrain along this route was excessively swampy but seen as easier to traverse in mid-winter. General Romanenko formed a shock group with his 42nd and 29th Rifle Corps with armor support and it was to launch its attack in the 15km-wide sector from Shatsilki on the Berezina southwest to Zherd Station on the Shatsilki–Kalinkavichy rail line, facing elements of XXXXI Panzer Corps. 42nd Corps' immediate objectives were the villages of Zareche and Sosnovka roughly 15km behind the front, so it attacked in a two-echelon formation to sustain its drive across the Zherdianka River and beyond.This required a regrouping in which the 194th provided cover for the 175th Rifle Division to move into first echelon and the 399th to move into second.

The first phase of the offensive began at dawn on January 16, 1944. From the beginning the 194th and 175th struggled to penetrate the German forward defenses, as related in its divisional history:

Once again included in 42nd Rifle Corp, 194th Rifle Division took part in combat operations along the Zherdianka River from 16 through 27 January. After a 35-minute artillery preparation, it attacked the enemy's positions in the Peshishche and Kun'ia sector with two of its regiments, but had no success. The 470th and 954th Rifle Regiments were not able to advance forward and went to ground, halted by a squall of Hitlerite fire. After being committed to combat from the second echelon, 616th Rifle Regiment also went to ground, failing to reach it assigned objectives. Only on the fourth day of the offensive did the division succeed in breaking through the enemy's defenses and capturing the enemy strongpoints at Peshishche, Kremen, Kun'ia, and Medved'.
During the battle for the village of Kun'ia, Major N. P. Volkov, a veteran of the division and the commander of 954th Rifle Regiment's 2nd Battalion, himself led his troops on the assault on the enemy's position.Struck by a hail of German bullets, the major fell, but, emulating the bravery of its commander, the battalion crushed the enemy and captured the village. Other subunits of the division exploited the battalion's success and, after overcoming the enemy resistance, captured the series of enemy strongpoints.
The 1st Battalion, 470th Rifle Regiment distinguished itself in the battle for Pecheshche... After withdrawing, the enemy managed to dig in along a new line extending along the Chirkovichi-Veliki Bor road. The enemy greeted the thinning ranks of the advancing troops with a hurricane of fire and fierce counterattacks, which, however, did not stop the advancing Soviet soldiers. Finally, the division smashed the enemy along that line and, continuing the offensive, cut the Iazvin-Sosnovka road and captured the village of Iazvin [15 kilometres northwest of Pechishche] by day's end on 26 January.

The advance of 42nd Corps was finally halted by the German 36th Infantry Division at Sosnovka and the large swath of swampy terrain that extended nearly 10km to its west. However, the 36th had given up considerable ground. The operation entered its second phase on February 2. By this time the 194th had left 42nd Corps and was operating under direct Army control. It, along with two other rifle divisions and the 161st Fortified Region, was assigned a largely defensive role on the right (north) wing of the Army; in fact, the division was so depleted it was operationally subordinated to the 161st for almost a full month. In four days of fighting the Army made minimal gains before Rokossovskii ordered it back to the defensive on February 6. On February 17 the STAVKA formed a 2nd Belorussian Front from Rokossovskii's left-flank armies and his front was redesignated as 1st Belorussian. Prior to a further renewal of the offensive on February 22, General Romanenko assigned the 194th, along with the 307th and 4th Rifle Divisions to the 25th Rifle Corps in a sector east of the Berezina River, but it was not part of the Army's shock group which attacked that day.

==== Mormal-Parichi Offensive ====
The Corps entered the fighting two days later, as recounted in the 194th's divisional history:

The offensive began on 24 February; however, in the beginning it did not achieve success. Only on the fourth day, 27 February, after it was reinforced by 270th Rifle Regiment and attacked toward Koravcha Dubrova, did the division decisively penetrate into the enemy's trenches, drive him from his occupied positions, and liberate the villages of Iskra, Zvezda, and Dedno [Ledno]...
During the ensuing 10 days, the division waged an intense battle with all three of its regiments for possession of Pleskovichi [Plesovichi, 23km north of Shatsilki], but in light of the enemy's significant superiority in manpower and artillery, we did not fully carry out our mission.

The Corps had attacked on a 10km-wide sector from Starina to south of Mormal against the defenses of XXXV Corps' 45th Infantry Division. The 194th, 307th and 4th Divisions were deployed from left to right. After taking the above-mentioned strongpoints and others they were to cut the Parichi–Zhlobin road. The 194th immediately became locked in the three-day struggle for Iskra, Zvezda, and Ledno, which was not broken until the assault was reinforced by 53rd Rifle Corps. These additional forces forced the 45th Infantry to begin falling back to intermediate defensive positions from 4-10km to the rear. The 194th pursued, advancing northward along the Ola River, north of Shatsilki, through Ola, 25km north of Shatsilki, toward Plesovichi and Korotkovichi. The offensive bogged down in a costly struggle for these strongpoints, which had been reinforced with battlegroups from 707th Security and 383rd Infantry Divisions. By the time Rokossovskii called a halt on February 29, Romanenko's shock group had advanced from 2-18km along 20km front. In a report to the STAVKA on March 4, Rokossovskii stated that he would go over to the defense for the entire period of the spring flooding, and asked for an allocation of 50,000 replacements for his 3rd and 48th Armies to bring their rifle divisions up to a strength of 7,000 personnel each, in preparation for a spring offensive.

== Operation Bagration ==
During March the 194th left 25th Corps and returned to direct Army control. The plans for a spring offensive gradually became preparation for a summer offensive. 48th Army was near the north flank of 1st Belorussian Front, facing the German 9th Army's strongholds at Rahachow and Zhlobin along the Dniepr, although the weight of its forces faced the latter. At the outset the 29th Rifle Corps had the 217th and 102nd Divisions under command, but was soon reinforced with the 194th and the 115th Fortified Region. Rokossovskii's objective in the first phase of the operation was the city of Babruysk which would be taken in a pincer movement by 3rd Army to the north and 65th Army to the south, with 48th Army applying pressure in the center. At this time the rifle divisions of the Front averaged about 7,200 personnel each.

=== Babruysk Offensive ===
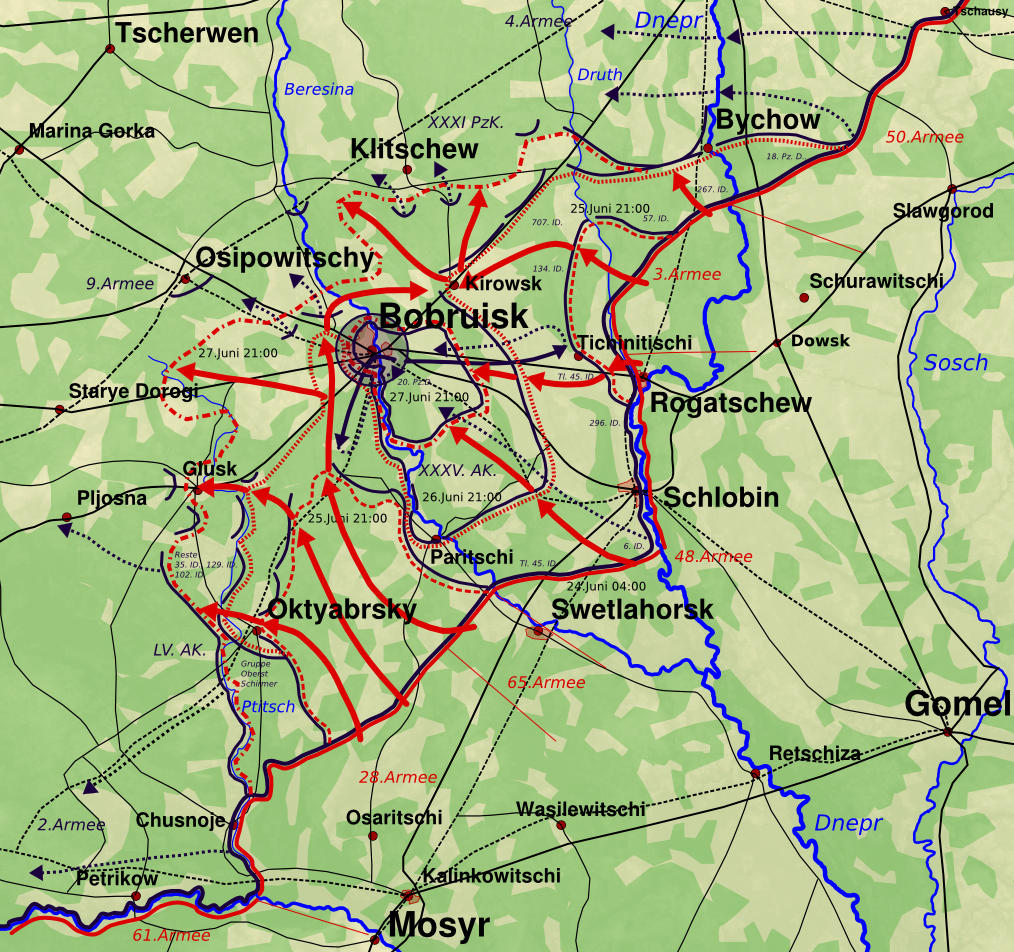
Development of the Babruysk Operation. Note that nearly all of 48th Army began north of Rahachow.

The offensive against German 9th Army opened with an artillery preparation beginning at 0200 hours on June 23. The four Corps of 48th Army, including the 29th, struck the 134th and 296th Infantry Divisions on a 20km-wide front. The 29th and 42nd Rifle Corps were expected to take Rahachow and territory to its north to assist the breakthrough of 3rd Army. On the second day at 0400 hours the two Corps unleashed another powerful artillery preparation lasting two hours against XXXV Corps at Rahachow. The terrain on the east bank of the Dniepr was mostly marshlands and the rain-swollen Drut River was difficult to bridge; despite these factors the Corps penetrated the first trench line after two hours and the second line was captured at 1130 before the German defense temporarily gelled. By evening two more trench lines had been penetrated and the leading elements were 5km west of Rahachow. The advancing infantry, with the aid of sappers, built corduroy roads for tanks and trucks. Once these were available Soviet armor and motorized infantry overwhelmed the 296th Infantry and broke into the rear. With the way clear the 9th Tank Corps began exploiting to the west, gaining 10km.

Meanwhile, the 9th Army still had three divisions holding a narrow bridgehead east of the Dniepr on both sides of Zhlobin that were facing encirclement and the Army commander, Gen. der Inf. H. Jordan, was demanding permission to withdraw them to create reserves. This was refused, but despite this some individual battalions and battlegroups were pulled out on June 25. As the situation deteriorated the 383rd Infantry was ordered to move out by truck at 0900 hours on June 26 toward Babruysk. This made little difference as the divisions were already effectively trapped. Zhlobin was cleared that evening.

Early on the morning of June 28, the 29th Corps was continuing to mop up German remnants in the forests between Zhlobin and the Berezina but in the afternoon began a crossing in the Polovets area to relieve elements of 65th Army south of Babruysk. However, reconnaissance by 356th Rifle Division discovered that the garrison had withdrawn to the city's center while a prisoner revealed that a breakout to the northwest was planned. By 1800 hours the Dniepr Flotilla had landed a party of the 217th Division in the eastern part of the city. The partially-successful breakout on June 29 considerably reduced German resistance in the city and it was cleared by 1000 hours. Within Babruysk alone the 9th Army lost 7,000 officers and men killed and 2,000 captured, 400 guns (100 in working order), 60 knocked-out tanks and assault guns, 500 other motor vehicles, plus six supply depots and 12 trainloads of supplies and equipment.

=== Minsk Offensive ===
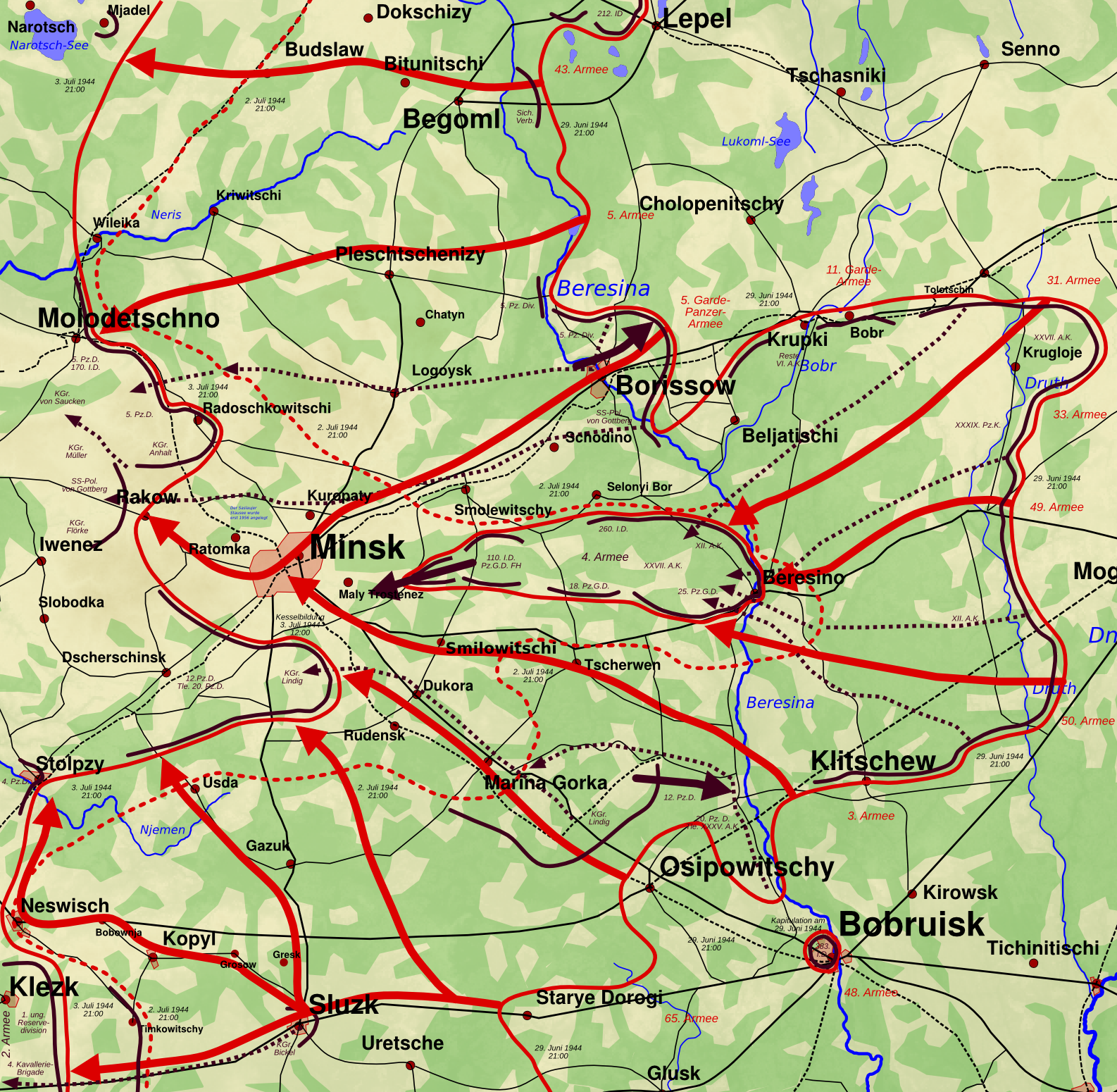
Minsk Offensive. Note initial position of 48th Army at Babruysk.

During June 29-30 the 48th Army regrouped its forces and created a pursuit grouping consisting of the 29th and 53rd Corps with the objective of liberating the Belarusian capital. Minsk was cleared on July 3, trapping most of what remained of German 9th and 4th Armies. As the exploitation continued, the city of Slonim was taken on July 10 and the Shchara River was crossed; in recognition of its part in these victories the 194th was awarded the Order of the Red Banner on July 25. In September the 48th Army was transferred to the 2nd Belorussian Front.

Corporal Georgii Vladimirovich Komarov had taken part in the assault crossing of the Shchara. A veteran of the Russian Civil War, and a member of the Communist Party of the Soviet Union since 1931, he had been drafted into the Red Army at Kuibyshev in February 1943. By this time he was serving as the Party organizer of the 5th Company of the 470th Rifle Regiment. On September 4, Komarov helped lead his company in a breakthrough of German defenses near the Narew River in the area of Grondy. He was seriously wounded, but refused to be evacuated, continuing to inspire his comrades through his personal example. He succumbed to his wounds on October 5, at the age of 48. On March 24, 1945, he was posthumously made a Hero of the Soviet Union.

== Into Poland and East Prussia ==
At the start of October the 194th was back under direct Army command but returned to 42nd Corps later in the month. During November it was moved again, now to 29th Corps. Prior to the start of the Vistula-Oder offensive it was again reassigned, now to 53rd Corps. At this time the Corps also commanded the 96th and 17th Rifle Divisions. In preparation for the offensive 48th Army was moved into the bridgehead over the Narew at Różan. It was tasked with launching the Front's main attack in conjunction with 2nd Shock Army on a 6km front with the immediate goal of reaching Mława. The Corps was deployed along the sector from the Army's right boundary line as far as the Orzyc River and had two divisions in the first echelon. The Corps had been reinforced with the 206th Light Artillery Brigade, 85th Heavy Howitzer Brigade (both of 15th Artillery Division), and the 479th Mortar Regiment.

On the first day of the offensive, January 14, the Army's forces advanced 3-6km against stubborn resistance and reached the approaches to Maków, which was taken the next day. A further gain of up to 10km was made on January 16, aided by clearing weather which allowed greater air support. While 48th Army covered another 16km the following day, the 8th Mechanized Corps, which was exploiting through the Army's breakthrough, captured the outer ring of the Mława fortified area. On the 17th the 5th Guards Tank Army deployed southwest of Maków and before long passed through the combat formations of 53rd Corps and attacked the 7th and 299th Infantry Divisions from the march. These divisions had been reinforced with 20 tanks and assault guns and put up stiff resistance before their positions were broken through. The next day 5th Guards Tanks completed the blockade of Mława and by the evening elements of 48th Army reached its outskirts. The German garrison, consisting of remnants of the 7th and 299th Divisions and the 30th Panzergrenadier Regiment, contested the major brick structures and a series of concrete pillboxes, but despite this units of 42nd Corps soon broke into the town. Heavy fighting continued overnight and by morning the garrison had been destroyed with its remnants taken prisoner while the 29th Corps stormed the important road junction and strongpoint of Przasnysz, allowing Marshal Rokossovskii to commit his 3rd Guards Cavalry Corps.

The 48th and 2nd Shock Armies now took up the pursuit northward toward the Frisches Haff, advancing as much as 30km and reaching a line from Działdowo to Bieżuń by day's end. On January 26 the 29th and 53rd Corps were fighting along the approaches to Guttstadt and had captured Wormditt while the 42nd Corps assisted 5th Guards Tanks in capturing the towns of Tolkemit and Mühlhausen, severing land communications to the Germans' East Prussian group of forces. 48th Army now turned its front to the northeast to securely close this group's escape route. German attacks to restore communications began almost immediately. By January 30 the escape attempts had been beaten off and 5th Guards Tanks began advancing, reaching the Passarge River and fighting for Frauenburg.

=== East Prussian Offensives ===
On February 11 the 48th Army was transferred to 3rd Belorussian Front, and at about the same time the 194th came back to 29th Corps, although in March it returned to 53rd Corps for the duration. This Front was responsible for eliminating the remaining German forces in East Prussia. By this time the Army's divisions, on average, did not exceed 3,500 personnel and it had only 85 tanks and self-propelled guns on strength. During late February and early March the Front prepared for a new offensive. 48th Army was to remain on the defensive against any further breakout attempts while the remainder of the Front advanced on Königsberg. It was to maintain a strong antitank defense in the direction of Braunsberg and also along the highway to Elbing. The offensive began at 1100 hours on March 13 following a 40-minute artillery preparation and the German defenses were broken into despite fierce resistance.

Braunsberg was captured on March 20 and two subunits of the 194th received rewards on April 26: the 616th and 954th Rifle Regiments were each awarded the Order of Kutuzov, 3rd Degree. On the same date the 470th Regiment received the same decoration for its part in the elimination of German forces that had been trapped in the Heiligenbeil Pocket. On March 25 the Army advanced up to 6km and captured the towns of Rossen and Runenberg. At this point it went over to the defensive and remained until the first days of May when it took part in attacks along the Baltic coast.

== Postwar ==
The men and women of the division ended the war with the full collective title of 194th Rifle, Rechitsa, Order of the Red Banner Division. (Russian: 194-я стрелковая Речицкая Краснознамённая дивизия.) In September the 48th Army was disbanded while its headquarters was repurposed as the headquarters of the Kazan Military District. 58th Corps was moved eastward where the division was stationed at Yoshkar-Ola before being moved to Kirov. In 1946 it was reformed as the 40th Rifle Brigade at Kirov in the Ural Military District as part of 10th Rifle Corps.

In December 1951 the 40th Rifle Brigade was expanded back into 194th Rifle Division, then redesignated as the 18th Rifle Division c. 1955

In June 1956 the 18th Rifle Division was reorganized as the 43rd Mechanised Division. Then reorganized as 130th Motor Rifle Division 1957-59 before disbanding for the final time.
