= Afanasy Gryaznov =

Soviet Army major general

Afanasy Sergeyevich Gryaznov
- Gryaznov in the 1950s or 1960s
- Born: 8 July 1899; Slastukha, Atkarsky Uyezd, Saratov Governorate, Russian Empire
- Died: 11 September 1969 (aged 70) Moscow, Soviet Union
- Allegiance: Russian SFSR; Soviet Union
- Branch: Red Army (later Soviet Army)
- Service years: 1919–1954
- Rank: Major general
- Commands: 64th Rifle Division (became 7th Guards Rifle Division); 1st Guards Rifle Corps; 14th Guards Rifle Division; 14th Rifle Corps; 15th Rifle Corps; 47th Rifle Corps; 99th Rifle Corps; 110th Rifle Corps; 82nd Rifle Corps
- Conflicts: Russian Civil War; World War II
- Awards: Order of Lenin; Order of the Red Banner (5); Order of Kutuzov, 2nd class

Afanasy Sergeyevich Gryaznov (Russian: Афанасий Сергеевич Грязнов; 8 July 1899 – 11 September 1969) was a Soviet Army major general.

Gryaznov joined the Red Army during the Russian Civil War and rose to junior command positions after its end. Holding command and staff positions in the Leningrad Military District during the 1920s and 1930s, he was studying at the Military Academy of the General Staff when Operation Barbarossa began. Gryaznov commanded the 64th Rifle Division (which became the 7th Guards) in the first months of the war and rose to lead the 1st Guards Rifle Corps in the Demyansk Offensive, but was relieved when the Soviet efforts in the latter failed. After commanding the 14th Guards Rifle Division from mid-1942, Gryaznov held a succession of corps commands during the rest of the war. His career ended in the early 1950s after serving as a professor at the Military Academy of the General Staff for several years.

== Early life and Russian Civil War ==
Gryaznov was born on 8 July 1899 in the village of Slastukha, Saratov Governorate. He worked as an apprentice mechanic and master's assistant in the rail depot at Petrovsk-Port station. After the Russian Revolution, he joined the depot worker's militia in October 1917, before returning to his homeland, where he joined the Red Guard volunteer detachment of Akifyev in February 1918 as an ordinary soldier. With the detachment, he fought in battles against the Czechoslovak Legion at Serdobsk and Penza. From July, with the Red Guard detachment of Kurgayev, he fought against the Don Army in the area of Povorino.

Gryaznov was hospitalized in his homeland between January and June 1919, and upon recovery in the latter month was sent to the Red Army, serving as a Red Army man in the separate plastun (foot) cavalry battalion of the Southern Army Group of the Eastern Front, which was merged into the Lower Ural Regiment of the 22nd Rifle Division. With the latter, he fought on the Uralsk front before his unit was shifted to the Southern Front in July. Sent to study at the Sanitary School of the sanitary (medical) units of the Southeastern Front in Saratov in September 1919, he became a nurse at the Alexandrovsky Military Hospital of the front in February 1920 upon the completion of his training. In July 1920 he was sent to study at the 1st Soviet Moscow Machine Gun Courses, which were renamed the 1st Soviet Combined Military School in 1921. That year, he participated in the suppression of the Kronstadt rebellion when the school sent a detachment to the front.

== Interwar period ==
Upon his graduation from the school in October 1922, Gryaznov was sent to serve as a platoon commander in the 2nd Militsiya Regiment of the Petrograd Separate Brigade, which in 1923 was renamed the Petrograd Militsiya Rifle Division. From March 1923 he served with the 59th Rifle Regiment of the 20th Rifle Division (formed from the Petrograd Division) as an assistant chief of weapons in a machine gun detachment and platoon commander. Gryaznov transferred to serve as a platoon commander in the Separate Kuzhenkovsky Guard Battalion of the Leningrad Military District in November 1924, and in January 1926 was again transferred, this time to the 33rd Rifle Regiment of the 11th Rifle Division. With the latter, he served as a platoon commander and assistant company commander, studying at the Leningrad Military-Political Courses from October 1927.

Gryaznov became a company political officer and company commander in the 10th Turkestan Rifle Regiment of the 4th Turkestan Rifle Division after completing the course in August 1928. He was sent to the Frunze Military Academy for advanced training in September 1931, and upon his graduation in May 1936 was appointed chief of staff of the 6th Caucasian Rifle Regiment of the 2nd Caucasian Rifle Division, stationed in the Kiev Military District. The regiment was soon renumbered as the 176th Rifle Regiment when the division became the 60th Rifle Division. In September 1937 he became an assistant section chief of the 1st department of the district staff, before entering the Military Academy of the General Staff in October 1938. In October 1939 Gryaznov was appointed chief of staff of the 67th Rifle Division (the former 20th) and with it participated in the occupation of the Baltic States. He returned to the academy in October 1940 to continue the second year of his studies there.

== World War II ==
After Operation Barbarossa began on 22 June 1941, Gryaznov was released from the academy and appointed officer for errands under the Western Front commander-in-chief, Marshal Semyon Timoshenko. He became commander of the 64th Rifle Division on 15 July, which he led as part of the 44th Rifle Corps in fighting near Yartsevo during the Battle of Smolensk. For its "courage in battle," the division became the 7th Guards Rifle Division, and Gryaznov commanded the latter in the Battle of Moscow as part of the 49th and 16th Armies of the front. Serving as commander of the 1st Guards Rifle Corps from 2 January 1942, he was promoted to major general eight days later. Gryaznov led the corps in the Demyansk Offensive against the German troops in the Demyansk Pocket as part of the Northwestern Front, but was relieved of command on 22 May 1942 after his corps failed to destroy the encircled forces.

After a month awaiting assignment, Gryaznov became commander of the 14th Guards Rifle Division on 23 June. Between August and October 1942 he led the division as part of the 63rd Army in the defensive phase of the Battle of Stalingrad. The division subsequently fought in Operation Uranus and Operation Little Saturn as part of the 21st Army and the 1st and 3rd Guards Armies of the Southwestern Front during late 1942 and early 1943. After serving temporarily commanding the 14th Rifle Corps from 24 December, Gryaznov was appointed commander of the 15th Rifle Corps on 15 January 1943. He led it as part of the 6th Army of the Southwestern Front in Operation Gallop, during which it captured Kupyansk and Balakleya. Injured in a car accident on 28 March, he was evacuated to a hospital in Moscow.

After recovering from his injuries, Gryaznov was appointed commander of the 47th Rifle Corps on 25 June 1943. He led it as part of the 40th Army of the Voronezh Front in the Battle of Kursk and the Belgorod–Kharkov Offensive. Hospitalized due to illness between 18 September and 9 November, Gryaznov was placed at the disposal of the Personnel Directorate after recovering. He became commander of the 99th Rifle Corps, part of the 21st Army in the Reserve of the Supreme High Command, on 20 December. In April, the corps was sent to the Leningrad Front with the army, and on the 15th of that month Gryaznov was transferred to command the 110th Rifle Corps, which he commanded for the rest of the war. The corps fought in the Vyborg–Petrozavodsk Offensive, the Baltic Offensive, and the blockade of the Courland Pocket. He was awarded the Order of Kutuzov, 2nd class, for his leadership of the corps in the Riga Offensive. In the recommendation for the award, his superior, 42nd Army commander Vladimir Sviridov, wrote that Gryaznov "fulfilled the assigned objectives with few casualties".

== Postwar ==
After the end of the war, Gryaznov continued to command the corps, which was relocated to the Odessa Military District in August 1945. In October he became commander of the 82nd Rifle Corps of the district, and in May 1946 was appointed a senior professor at the Voroshilov Higher Military Academy (the former Military Academy of the General Staff). This would be his last post, as he was transferred to the reserve on 11 January 1954. Gryaznov lived in Moscow, where he died on 11 September 1969.

== Awards and honors ==
Gryaznov was a recipient of the following awards and decorations:

- Order of Lenin
- Order of the Red Banner (5)
- Order of Kutuzov, 2nd class
