= Sergey Iovlev =

Sergey Ivanovich Iovlev
- Iovlev in 1948
- Born: 30 September 1899; Krestovskoye, Shadrinsky Uyezd, Perm Governorate, Russian Empire
- Died: May 1979 (aged 79) Kiev, Soviet Union
- Allegiance: Russian SFSR; Soviet Union
- Branch: Red Army; Soviet Border Troops
- Service years: 1918–1954
- Rank: Major general
- Commands: 64th Rifle Division; 50th Rifle Division; 133rd Rifle Division; 1st Guards Motor Rifle Division; 194th Rifle Division; 215th Rifle Division; 36th Rifle Corps; 59th NKVD Rifle Division
- Conflicts: Russian Civil War; World War II
- Awards: Order of Lenin (2); Order of the Red Banner (4); Order of Suvorov, 2nd class; Order of the Patriotic War, 1st class (3)

Sergey Ivanovich Iovlev (Russian: Сергей Иванович Иовлев; 30 September 1899 – May 1979) was a Red Army major general.

After rising to junior command positions during the Russian Civil War, Iovlev spent most of the 1920s and 1930s with the Soviet Border Troops. Decorated for his performance as a regimental commander during the Winter War, he commanded the 64th Rifle Division in Belarus when Operation Barbarossa began. Iovlev escaped from encirclement and commanded several divisions in the Battle of Moscow and after being relieved of command of the 194th Rifle Division in late 1942 was sent behind German lines to lead partisans. In early 1943 he became commander of the 215th Rifle Division, and in early 1944 was sent to complete a course. Ending the war as commander of an NKVD division in western Ukraine, Iovlev was chief of an NKVD school postwar before retiring in the early 1950s.

== Early life and Russian Civil War ==
Iovlev was born on 30 September 1899 in the village of Krestovskoye, Shadrinsky Uyezd, Perm Governorate. He studied at a higher primary school and then a teachers' seminary in Shadrinsk from 1912. He joined the Shadrinsk druzhina of the Red Army on 24 February 1918 during the Russian Civil War. Sent to the front near Samara with a detachment in May, he participated in fighting against the Czechoslovak Legion. Captured by the Czechs in battle in the vicinity in June, Iovlev spent three months in the Samara prison, then was transferred to the Totskoye camp. He escaped from the latter two weeks later and hid among the local peasants until the capture of Buguruslan by the Red Army. Sent to a hospital in Moscow for treatment, he was assigned to a march battalion on arrival.

From May 1919, Iovlev served as a Red Army man and platoon commander in the 104th Rifle Regiment of the 12th Rifle Division. He fought on the Southern Front with the unit against the Armed Forces of South Russia on the Don River, then in the Voronezh–Kastornoye and Donbass Operations. In the winter of 1919–1920 he fell ill with typhoid and was hospitalized. Sent to study at the one-year Military School of the Eastern Front at Samara in spring 1920, he served on the Turkestan Front in the fighting for Bukhara with a cadet detachment drawn from the school. After graduating from the school, Iovlev became chief of the administrative and mobilization directorate of the Revolutionary Military Council of the puppet Khorezm Soviet Republic in May 1921. Participating in the suppression of the Basmachi movement, he served as assistant chief of the operational section of the staff of the Samarkand Operational Group of Forces from August 1922.

== Interwar period ==
Studying at the Lenin Combined Military School in Tashkent from November 1922, Iovlev fought in the elimination of Basmachi in the Chatkal valley with a cadet detachment. Completing training at the school in August 1924, he was posted to Arkhangelsk to serve as a platoon leader in the regimental school of the 29th Rifle Regiment of the 10th Rifle Division. Transferred to the Border Troops in October 1925, Iovlev was appointed assistant commandant of a sector of the Petrozavodsk Border Detachment. He was sent to study at the Frunze Military Academy in October 1927 and upon graduation in May 1930 became a tactics instructor at the Higher Border School in Moscow. From October 1931, he served as a sector head in the OGPU personnel directorate.

Iovlev held a succession of positions with the OGPU and NKVD Troops through the 1930s, beginning with the 1st Belorussian NKVD Regiment at Minsk in May 1933. In August 1934 he became chief of staff of the 4th Border School in Saratov, then chief of the Magnitnaya Border Detachment in August 1936. Appointed chief of the combat training section of the staff of the North Caucasus NKVD District at Rostov-on-Don in February 1938, Iovlev served as assistant chief of the combat training department of the staff of the NKVD Border Troops in Moscow from May 1939.

== World War II ==
In December 1939, Iovlev became commander of the 97th Rifle Regiment of the 18th Rifle Division of the 15th Army of the Northwestern Front, fighting in the Winter War. For his "courage and heroism" in the exit from encirclement of the garrison of south Lemetti as part of the detachment of Kombrig Kozlov, he was awarded the Order of the Red Banner on 20 May 1940. He was appointed commander of the 64th Rifle Division of the Western Special Military District, stationed in Belarus, on 8 June.

After Operation Barbarossa began, Iovlev led the 64th in the Battle of Białystok–Minsk, defending the approaches to Minsk as part of the 13th Army. He was credited with "skilfully organizing" the anti-tank defenses of the division, which allowed the division to hold its positions for a week, although suffering heavy losses. Facing encirclement, the remnants of the division retreated towards the Berezina River and then Smolensk. Iovlev led a group northeast. They acted as partisans before reaching Soviet lines on 26 September in the area of Bely in the sector of the 29th Army.

For three weeks in October, Iovlev commanded the 133rd and 50th Rifle Divisions, then became commander of the OSNAZ detachment of the Western Front, disrupting the German rear. In December he was appointed commander of the 1st Guards Motor Rifle Division of the 33rd Army, leading it in the Soviet counteroffensive during the Battle of Moscow. In the latter, the division captured Naro-Fominsk. He was transferred to command the 194th Rifle Division on 20 January 1942, but was relieved in October for "inaction and insufficiently demanding command" and appointed deputy commander of the 19th Rifle Division. However, Iovlev never served in the latter position and instead in November was sent by the front behind German lines to command the Vadino Partisan Group.

Returning to the army, Iovlev, promoted to major general on 27 January 1943, was appointed commander of the 215th Rifle Division on 23 February. He led the division as part of the 36th Rifle Corps during the Smolensk–Roslavl Offensive, in which it recaptured Smolensk and crossed the Sozh River, receiving the name of Smolensk as an honorific in recognition of its actions. Iovlev's performance in the latter was evaluated by his superior as displaying initiative and personal bravery by leading from the front. He temporarily commanded the corps, defending positions in eastern Belarus, between 17 and 29 February 1944. Sent to study at the Voroshilov Higher Military Academy in April, he completed an accelerated course there on 29 December and in January 1945 was appointed commander of the 59th NKVD Rifle Division of the Lvov Military District.

== Postwar ==
After the end of the war, Iovlev became chief of the Sortavala NKVD Officer Improvement School in September 1945. He continued in that position for the rest of his career, and on 15 April 1954 was transferred to the reserve. Iovlev lived and worked in Kiev, where he died in May 1979.

== Awards and honors ==
Iovlev was a recipient of the following awards and decorations:

- Order of Lenin (2)
- Order of the Red Banner (4)
- Order of Suvorov, 2nd class
- Order of the Patriotic War, 1st class (3)
