= 1st Guards Special Rifle Corps =

Red Army blocking formation active briefly in 1941

The 1st Guards Special Rifle Corps (Russian: 1-й особый гвардейский стрелковый корпус 1-ĭ osobyĭ gvardyeĭskiĭ strelkovyĭ korpus) was a hastily formed Red Army corps active briefly in 1941, during the German advance on Moscow.

The Corps was created on 4 October 1941 by special request of the STAVKA supreme command, in an area of the city of Mtsensk (the Oryol Oblast). Initially its structure included the 6th Guards Rifle Division, 5th Airborne Corps, 4th Tank Brigade, 11th Tank Brigade, the Tula military school, several Border Guard Regiments, two artillery regiments, two rocket artillery battalions and the 6th reserve aviation group. Major General Dmitri Lelyushenko was appointed the commander of the corps. The corps was given several tasks: to destroy the nearby enemy, to break through into Oryol, to slow the progress of the German tank armies, and to block the way to Tula.

The Soviet government and STAVKA command highly valued the efforts and sacrifices of the 1st Guards Rifle Corps in the Oryol-Bryansk defensive operation, which took place from 4 to 18 October 1941. On 11 November the National Commissioner of Defense renamed the 4th Tank Brigade, which played a vital role in the battle of Mtsensk, the 1st Guards tank brigade. The Commander of the brigade, Colonel Mikhail Katukov, was eventually promoted to commander of the Soviet 1st Guards Tank Army, and was twice awarded the Hero of the Soviet Union award.

On 12 October 1941, by the order of STAVKA supreme command, the corps was transformed into the 26th Army. On 25 October 1941, its field HQ was disbanded, and its constituent formations were transferred to the 50th Army of the Bryansk Front.

== 2nd Formation ==
A new 1st Guards Rifle Corps was formed on 31 December 1941. Its first commander, Col. Afanasy Gryaznov, was appointed the same day; he would be promoted to major general ten days later. As of 1 February it was under the direct command of Northwestern Front, with the following units in its order of battle:

- 7th Guards Rifle Division
- 14th, 15th, 52nd Rifle Brigades
- 72nd Naval Rifle Brigade
- 203rd, 204th and 205th Ski Brigades
- 878th Corps Artillery Regiment (re-designated 37th Guards Artillery Regiment later that month, with 4 batteries of 4 122mm guns each.)

The Corps saw action around the Demyansk Pocket for most of 1942, with a number of rifle brigades under command, but also with 7th Guards Rifle and 37th Guards Artillery under command as well. In October the Corps headquarters went into the Reserve of the Supreme High Command, where it was assigned to the 1st Reserve Army, which later became the 2nd Guards Army. For the duration of the war it served as an administrative command, with no assigned support units.

== Sources and See also ==
- ru:1-й особый гвардейский стрелковый корпус
- http://rkkaww2.armchairgeneral.com/maps/1941W/Moscow41/1SGRC_Orel-Mtsensk_Oct3_11_41.jpg
- Main Personnel Directorate of the Ministry of Defense of the Soviet Union (1964). Командование корпусного и дивизионного звена советских вооруженных сил периода Великой Отечественной войны 1941 – 1945 гг [Commanders of Corps and Divisions in the Great Patriotic War, 1941–1945] (in Russian). Moscow: Frunze Military Academy. p. 42
