= Brasovo =

Brasovo Брасово
- Selo
- Location within Bryansk Oblast Location within Russia
- Coordinates: 52°35′N 34°36′E
- Country: Russia
- Region: Bryansk Oblast
- District: Brasovsky District
- Time zone: UTC+3:00

Brasovo (Russian: Бра́сово) is a rural locality (a selo) in Brasovsky District, Bryansk Oblast, Russia. The population was 1,363 as of 2018. There are 11 streets.

== Geography ==
Brasovo is located 4 km northeast of Lokot (the district's administrative centre) by road. Chistopolyansky and Lokot are the nearest rural localities.
