= Kremyonki, Kaluga Oblast =

Kremyonki Кремёнки
- Town
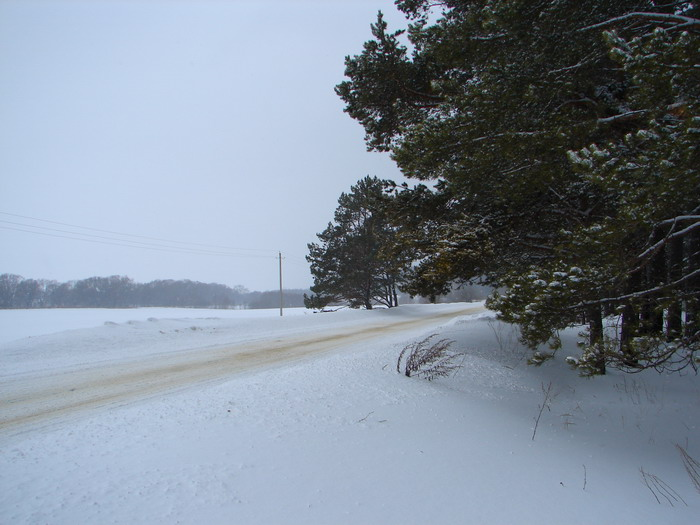
- Winter in Kremyonki

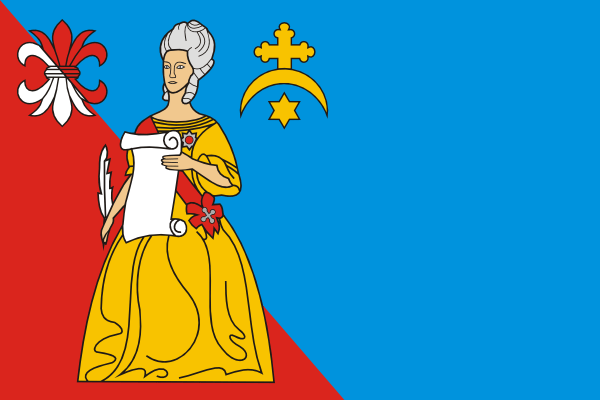
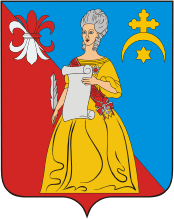
- Flag Coat of arms
- Interactive map of Kremyonki
- Location of Kremyonki Kremyonki (Kaluga Oblast)
- Coordinates: 54°53′N 37°07′E
- Country: Russia
- Federal subject: Kaluga Oblast
- Administrative district: Zhukovsky District
- Founded: 17th century
- Town status since: December 29, 2004
- Elevation: 130 m (430 ft)

Population (2010 Census)
  - Total: 11,582
  - Estimate (2023): 11,637 (+0.5%)

Municipal status
  - Municipal district: Zhukovsky Municipal District
  - Urban settlement: Kremyonki Urban Settlement
  - Capital of: Kremyonki Urban Settlement
- Time zone: UTC+3 (MSK)
- Postal code: 249185
- OKTMO ID: 29613160001
- Website: mo-kremenki.ru

Kremyonki (Russian: Кремёнки) is a town in Zhukovsky District of Kaluga Oblast, Russia. Population: 11,745 (2021 census); 11,582 (2010 census); 12,128 (2002 census);

== History ==
Town status was granted to Kremyonki on December 29, 2004.

== Administrative and municipal status ==
Within the framework of administrative divisions, Kremyonki is subordinated to Zhukovsky District. As a municipal division, the town of Kremyonki is incorporated within Zhukovsky Municipal District as Kremyonki Urban Settlement.
