= 64th Rifle Division (1925–1941) =

- Active: May 1925 – September 1941
- Country: Soviet Union
- Branch: Red Army
- Type: Infantry
- Engagements: World War II; Battle of Białystok–Minsk; Battle of Smolensk

Commanders
- Notable commanders: Sergey Iovlev; Afanasy Gryaznov

The 64th Rifle Division (Note: The 64th Rifle Division formed in 1925 was officially referred to as the 64th Rifle Division (1st formation) by the official list of Red Army units compiled postwar because it was the first of two unrelated units designated the 64th Rifle Division in existence between 1941 and 1945.) was an infantry division of the Red Army during the interwar period and World War II. The division suffered heavy losses in the Battle of Białystok–Minsk but with some troops escaping from encirclement, it was rebuilt in mid-July 1941. For its actions in the Battle of Smolensk it became the elite 7th Guards Rifle Division.

== Prewar service ==
The 64th Rifle Division was formed in May 1925 in Smolensk as a cadre-strength territorial unit from the 80th Rifle Regiment of the 27th Rifle Division. As a territorial unit, the division conducted annual training for thousands of locals in the next decade. By 1935, its headquarters, 190th Rifle Regiment, and 64th Artillery Regiment were at Smolensk, while the 191st Rifle Regiment was at Roslavl and the 192nd Rifle Regiment was at Orsha. The 190th was named for the Smolensk City Council and the 192nd had the honorific Orsha. The division was assigned to the 11th Rifle Corps of the Belorussian Military District together with the 29th Rifle Division, also a territorial unit. The division was switched to the cadre model in the late 1930s and during the expansion of the Red Army in August and September 1939 its rifle regiments of the division were expanded to form three new divisions: the 64th, 145th, and the 164th. The 64th remained at Smolensk, while the 145th was sent to Oryol, and the 164th remained at Orsha. During the Soviet invasion of Poland in September 1939, the division advanced into what was annexed as western Belarus with the second-echelon 10th Army. Although it was not with the 11th Rifle Corps or the invasion force on 17 September, it had returned to that unit by 2 October.

Colonel Sergey Iovlev, who had led a regiment in the Winter War, became division commander on 8 June 1940. In the spring of 1941, the division was organized along shtat 04/120 with more than 6,000 cadre personnel. It received 6,000 conscripts to bring it up to strength from 1 June, and was sent to the Dorogobuzh camp near Smolensk. The division became part of the 44th Rifle Corps of the Western Special Military District together with the 108th Rifle Division, and was ordered from the Smolensk and Vyazma area to the area of Minsk for exercises on 15 June. On 20 to 21 June the first units of the division unloaded at the station of Ratomka near Minsk.

== Battle of Smolensk ==
From the beginning of Operation Barbarossa, the 44th Rifle Corps became part of the 13th Army of the Western Front and was tasked with defending the northern sector of the Minsk Fortified Region. Between 25 and 28 August, the 64th Rifle Division fought in sustained battles, with the 159th Rifle Division fighting in the area of Zaslavl, the 30th Rifle Regiment in the area of Rogovo, and the 288th Rifle Regiment to the north. The division was encircled on 29 June and in the first ten days of July fought its way out to the east.

After breaking out of encirclement, the division was rebuilt in mid-July. Colonel Afanasy Gryaznov, who had been a staff officer at the Western Front headquarters, took command of the division on 15 July. Having completed rebuilding, the division conducted a forced march to the area of Yartsevo on 26 July to join the Battle of Smolensk. The division entered battle from the march on the night of 29–30 July despite being 20 percent incomplete. From 30 July to 6 August, the 64th fought against the German 7th, 239th and 364th Infantry Regiments on the line of Staro-Zavopye, Skrushevskiye, and the Vop river, where it stopped the German advance and manage to force a retreat to the west. The division was transferred from the 44th Rifle Corps to the direct control of the 16th Army on 16 August.

At 10:00 on 17 August the division went on the offensive in the general direction of Leskovki, and Nefedovshchina. The attack put the opposing German troops to flight, as they withdrew in disorder, abandoning weapons and ammunition. By the end of the day on 19 August, the German troops, bringing up reserves, established a new defensive line on the Tsarevich river. In these actions the division captured 18 guns, 540 shells, 30 machine guns, 250,000 rounds of ammunition, 2,000 mortar bombs, ten mortars, nine radios, 19 submachine guns, three vehicles, six bicycles and a few hundred rifles. Repeated German attacks against the 64th on 26 August were repulsed. Despite its small numbers, the division launched a counterattack against the German troops. Until 11 September the division fought in sustained battles as part of the 19th Army on the line of the Tsarevich.

The division was withdrawn to the front reserve on 12 September and concentrated in the area of Gorokhovka, south of Vadino station. On 17 September, being loaded onto troop trains at the stations of Izdeshkovo and Alfyorovo, the 64th was withdrawn to the reserve, to Voronezh. The division concentrated in Voronezh by the end of the day on 21 September. The division was converted into the 7th Guards Rifle Division on 26 September 1941.
