= 7th Guards Rifle Division =

- Active: 1941–1946
- Country: Soviet Union
- Branch: Red Army
- Type: Division
- Role: Infantry
- Engagements: World War II; Battle of Moscow; Demyansk Pocket; Operation Polyarnaya Zvezda; Baltic Offensive; Riga Offensive; Memel Offensive Operation; Courland Pocket
- Decorations: Order of the Red Banner
- Battle honours: Rezekne

Commanders
- Notable commanders: Col. Afanasy Gryaznov; Maj. Gen. Efim Vasilevich Bedin; Maj. Gen. Maksim Evseevich Kozyr; Maj. Gen. Mikhail Emmanulovich Moskalik

The 7th Guards Rifle Division was reformed as an elite infantry division of the Red Army in September 1941, based on the 1st formation of the 64th Rifle Division and served in that role until after the end of the Great Patriotic War. It was first assigned to Bryansk Front, then moved to Western Front where it took part in the early stages of the winter counteroffensive northwest of Moscow as part of 16th Army. On December 31 the 1st Guards Rifle Corps was formed for the second time and the 7th Guards was assigned to it as its core formation. It was then sent north to join Northwestern Front and became locked into the dismal fighting around Demyansk until that salient was finally evacuated by the German II Army Corps in February 1943. Through the rest of that year it participated in battles in the Staraya Russa region, mostly under command of 1st Shock Army, until in January 1944 it was transferred to the 7th Guards Rifle Corps of 10th Guards Army in the Nevel region. During operations in the Baltic states that summer and autumn the 7th Guards was awarded both a battle honor and the Order of the Red Banner. In March 1945 it joined the Courland Group of Forces of Leningrad Front on the Baltic coast containing the German forces encircled in northwest Latvia. Following the German surrender it was moved to Estonia where it was disbanded in 1946.

== Formation ==
The division was officially raised to Guards status on September 26, 1941, although its sub-units would not be redesignated until February 1942. Its order of battle, based on the first wartime shtat (table of organization and equipment) for rifle divisions, was eventually as follows:

- 14th Guards Rifle Regiment (from 30th Rifle Regiment)
- 20th Guards Rifle Regiment (from 159th Rifle Regiment)
- 26th Guards Rifle Regiment (from 288th Rifle Regiment)
- 25th Guards Artillery Regiment (from 163rd Light Artillery Regiment)
- 1st Guards Antitank Battalion
- 4th Guards Reconnaissance Company
- 12th Guards Sapper Battalion
- 6th Guards Signal Battalion (later 13th Guards Signal Company)
- 10th Guards Medical/Sanitation Battalion
- 11th Guards Chemical Defense (Anti-gas) Company
- 1st Guards Motor Transport Company (later 4th Guards Motor Transport Battalion)
- 3rd Guards Field Bakery
- 13th Guards Divisional Veterinary Hospital
- 9th Guards Economic Company (from December 10, 1943)
- 140th Field Postal Station
- 105th Field Office of the State Bank

Col. Afanasy Gryaznov, who had led the 64th Rifle Division since July 24, carried on in command. As of October 1 the division is listed as being at the disposal of Bryansk Front. It was positioned far enough to the east that it did not get swept up in the initial stages of Operation Typhoon. After falling back from the Kaluga region in late October, the division was transferred to the 49th Army in Western Front by the start of November.

== Battle of Moscow ==
At this time the STAVKA and the Front command were making every effort to hold the city of Serpukhov. By November 7 the 7th Guards had moved into the sector from Shatovo to Noviki to Dashkovka and was preparing a defense. It was joined on November 10 by the 415th Rifle Division from the Far East and together they secured the Army's right (north) flank. Until November 23 the division was engaged in stubborn fighting with the attacking German forces and on that date was defending the line from Gurevo to Drakino with one rifle regiment while the other two regiments were concentrating in the area of Shatovo, Ivankovo and Kalinovo, about 5 km south of Serpukhov. From that date it was boarding trains at the Podolsk station en route to Povarovo station, having been transferred to 16th Army. On November 25 its lead regiment occupied a defensive line from the woods east of Yesipovo and Zhukovo (8 km southeast of Solnechnogorsk) while the remaining units were concentrating, as they disembarked, in an area about 12 km southeast of the same city with the objective of occupying a defensive line from Shelepanovo to Terekhovo to Zhukovo, astride the Leningrad road.

During the following days the 7th Guards was involved in heavy fighting in the area south of Solnechnogorsk with the German 4th Panzer Group seeking to break out to the southeast. 16th Army faced the heaviest German attacks during November 29-30 as they attacked along the Kamenka-Ozeretskoe road, and along the Leningrad and Istra roads. By the end of November 30 the division, along with the 8th and 9th Guards and 18th Rifle Divisions, was waging a fierce struggle along part of the line from Lyalovo to Alabushevo to Barantsevo to Zhevnevo. During December 2-3 the German forces managed to take Kryukovo after heavy street fighting but were unable to break through 16th Army's lines. The 7th and 8th Guards continued to contest their hold there into the night of December 5 as the German forces began to go over to the defense.

=== Winter Counteroffensive ===
On the evening of December 6 Lt. Gen. Konstantin Rokossovsky, commander of 16th Army, reported to the Western Front command that the Army would go over to the attack at 1000 hours the next day and described his objectives (in part):

2. The 7th Guards Rifle Division is to attack with the objective of taking Lyalovo and by the end of the day to consolidate along the line Klushino - Lyalovo(excluding)-Chashnikovo (four km southwest of Lyalovo)(exclusively).

The German forces put up fierce resistance along the entire front and the division's attack was halted by defensive fire. Despite this the vastly overstretched 4th Panzer Group began to withdraw to the west. The division had more success on December 8, driving two battalions out of Lyalovo which then began to fall back toward Zhilino and Nikolskoe. The next day it was pulled back into the Army reserve in the area of Bolshie Rzhavki, and on December 14 it went into the Reserve of the Supreme High Command.

At the start of January 1942 the 7th Guards was still in the Reserve, but at the same time the 1st Guards Rifle Corps was being formed for the second time and Colonel Gryaznov was appointed to its command on January 5, being replaced in divisional command by Col. Efim Vasilevich Bedin. The division formed the major unit of the Corps, backed by the 14th, 15th and 52nd Rifle Brigades, 72nd Naval Rifle Brigade, 69th Tank Brigade and the 203rd, 204th and 205th Ski Battalions and was at the disposal of the command of Northwestern Front by February 1. During January the very successful Toropets–Kholm Offensive by Kalinin Front had deeply outflanked the German II Army Corps to the south of its positions around Demyansk, and Northwestern Front saw the opportunity to encircle and destroy that Corps. Both the 1st and 2nd Guards Rifle Corps were deployed to the region southeast of Lake Ilmen in order to complete the encirclement from the north.

== Battles for Demyansk ==
In the last days of January Northwestern Front's 11th Army created a 32km-wide gap in the German defenses down the Redya Valley. The lead elements of 1st Guards Rifle Corps arrived near Staraya Russa after an approach march of 110km over frozen marsh tracks from Valday. On February 2 the 14th and 15th Rifle Brigades, followed by 7th Guards, were ordered to seize a crossing over the Redya at Davidovo. At the same time the command of German 16th Army was scrambling to create several small battlegroups to control key road intersections. Battlegroup Leopold at Davidovo commanded about 900 men from a wide variety of sources, backed by artillery, antitank guns and mortars. On February 3 it repulsed the 15th Brigade with heavy losses. The more experienced 7th Guards soon came up, and 1st Guards Corps managed so slip ski troops behind the German river defenses. On February 5 the Corps launched a concentric attack that nearly overwhelmed Battlegroup Leopold; its survivors were forced to retreat westward. The Corps promptly advanced southeast and liberated the village of Ramushevo on the Lovat River on February 8. This cut the last road into Demyansk and II Corps was now completely dependent on airlift for supplies.

On February 20 Northwestern Front began a concentric attack with 1st Guards Corps and Group Ksenofontov (primarily the 154th Naval Rifle and 42nd Rifle Brigades of 3rd Shock Army) to complete the encirclement which occurred five days later when the two forces linked up near Zeluchye. Slow movement through the mostly trackless forests and swamps of the region would be characteristic of the remainder of the battles for the pocket. The Front now received orders to crush the encircled grouping within four to five days. 7th Guards, backed by several rifle brigades and ski battalions, began a series of violent attacks on Group Eicke at Zeluchye, which was based on about 4,000 men of the 3rd SS Division Totenkopf. These attacks inflicted about 60 percent casualties on the SS men, but also cost the Soviet forces very heavily. In the end the German forces held the western part of the pocket in late February by the thinnest of margins.

German plans for the relief of the pocket began almost at once and Operation Brückenschlag began at 0730 hours on March 21. By the end of the month the relief force was still 7km from Ramushevo and 20km from Group Eicke inside the pocket. The spring thaw turned the land to a quagmire and the German advance was reduced to a crawl; it wasn't until April 12 that their leading elements were able to spot Ramushevo in the distance. Two days later a breakout effort, Operation Fallreep began, using a force mostly based on the 32nd Infantry Division to batter a thin wedge through the 7th Guards' positions and advance towards the Lovat. It took another week of fighting for the relief force to capture Ramushevo and the breakout force to clear the east bank of the river, but the linkup was finally made late on April 21. A tenuous ground link less than 4km wide in places was soon established, but II Corps remained dependent in part on airlifted supplies.

In June the 1st Guards Corps, which now consisted of the 7th Guards and 391st Rifle Divisions, came under command of the 1st Shock Army which held the south side of the Ramushevo corridor. The Corps launched offensives in July, August and September in efforts to link up with 11th Army and cut the lifeline, but 7th Guards played little role in these. On September 27 the 16th Army launched Operation Michael in an attempt to drive back or even destroy the 1st Guards Corps in a salient it held south of the corridor. Supported by artillery and airstrikes the Germans surrounded and overwhelmed one regiment of the division within hours. After a six-day fight the east side of the salient was smashed in, and after a regrouping the west side was struck on October 7. With 1st Shock on the verge of a crushing defeat, the salient was evacuated. Later that month the 1st Guards Corps headquarters went into the Reserve of the Supreme High Command and the 7th Guards became a separate division under 1st Shock Army.

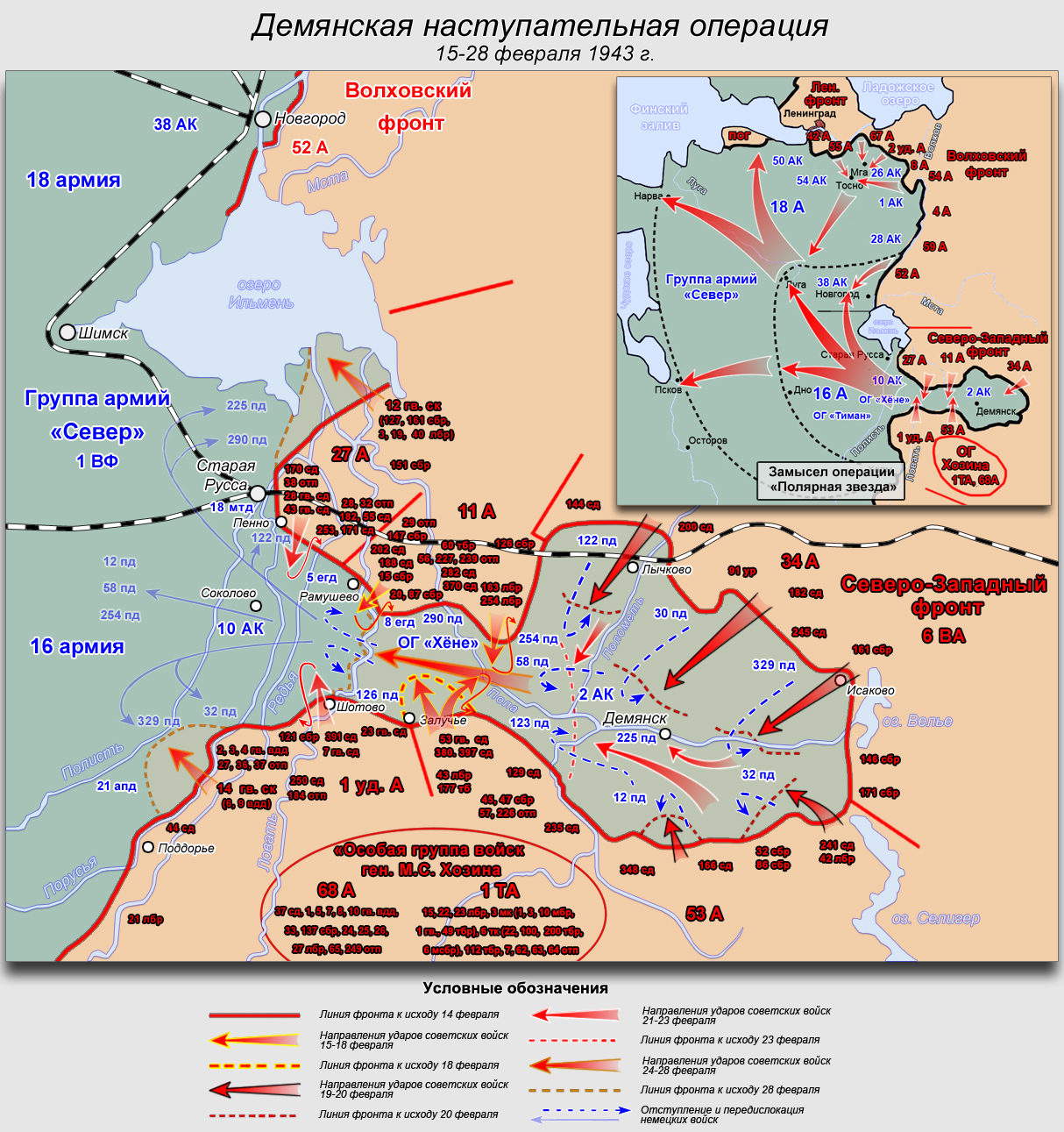
Soviet positions at Demyansk, spring 1943. The 7th Guards was in the 1st Shock Army sector south of the Ramushevo corridor

The Soviet forces around Demyansk were intended to play a role in the second Soviet winter offensive, which also included Operation Uranus and Operation Mars, if only to tie down German forces that could be more usefully employed elsewhere. Yet another attack on the corridor began on the night of November 23/24, this time focused on its eastern end, but the division played no major role in it. On November 27 Colonel Bedin was promoted to the rank of major general. Given that Demyansk had always been partially supplied by air, following the encirclement of the German 6th Army at Stalingrad those air assets were much more required to the south. Too late to make a difference, on January 31, 1943 Hitler authorized the evacuation of the salient.

Meanwhile on January 27 General Bedin handed his command to Maj. Gen. Nikolai Pavlovich Anisimov. Bedin would go on to command the 253rd Rifle Division and became a Hero of the Soviet Union in October during the Battle of the Dniepr. In the aftermath of Operation Iskra, which had restored land communications with Leningrad, Marshal Georgy Zhukov planned a further operation, Polyarnaya Zvezda, intended to completely end the siege of that city and destroy Army Group North. Northwestern Front's role in the offensive would once again be the elimination of the Demyansk pocket. At the same time the German command was planning its Operation Ziethen, the phased withdrawal from the salient. 1st Shock Army's part in the offensive was to begin on February 19. It was regrouped westward to attack the south side of the mouth of the corridor and was reinforced with four tank regiments, two artillery divisions, two Guards Mortar divisions, and two aviation corps. The 391st and 7th Guards formed a secondary shock group to launch an attack on a 5km sector from Shotovo to Viazki, with the objective of taking Ramushevo. In the event, nothing went as planned. In mid-month intense cold was replaced by continuous rain with reinforcements and supplies becoming bogged down. Ziethen began on February 17 and immediately began freeing up German troops to form reserves. 1st Shock's attack had to be postponed until February 26 by which time it was facing three German divisions instead of one. The assault troops managed to gain from 1 - 3km with great difficulty, and a further effort the next day was stopped in its tracks.

=== Operations in 1943 ===
On March 7 General Anisimov traded places with Maj. Gen. Maksim Evseevich Kozyr, commander of the 391st. In May the 7th Guards finally left 1st Shock and moved to the Front reserves where it joined the 14th Guards Rifle Corps. In a final change in command on May 15 Col. Mikhail Emmanulovich Moskalik took over from General Kozyr. Kozyr would go on to become a Hero of the Soviet Union as commander of the 232nd Rifle Division before being killed in action while serving as deputy commander of 50th Rifle Corps in April 1945. Moskalik would be promoted to major general on October 16. In July the 14th Guards Corps was briefly assigned to the 34th Army but by the beginning of September the division had been reassigned to the 12th Guards Rifle Corps and was back in the Northwestern Front reserves.

On November 19 Northwestern Front was disbanded and most of its forces, including 12th Guards Corps, came under command of 2nd Baltic Front. The 7th Guards would remain in this Front until March 1945. 12th Guards Corps was subordinated to 1st Shock Army, but in January 1944 the division was reassigned to the 7th Guards Rifle Corps of 10th Guards Army. This Army had been under command of 1st Baltic Front until its transfer, which covered a distance of 210km, began on December 8 and was completed on December 31, 1943. At this time the 7th Guards Corps was made up of three regular rifle divisions (207th, 208th and 312th) but when the Army went back into action on January 14 these had been replaced by the 7th, 21st and 119th Guards Rifle Divisions. The 7th Guards would remain under this Corps and Army command for the duration.

== Baltic Offensives ==
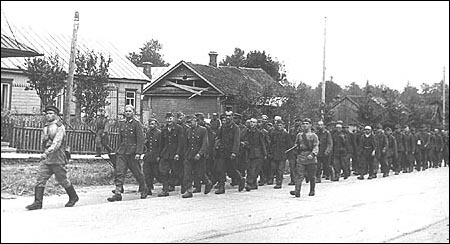
German POWs march through Rezekne, 1944

Near the end of June, as the destruction of Army Group Center was going on in Belarus, the 7th Guards was in the area of Novorzhev in western Russia, facing the defenses of the German Panther–Wotan line. During July it took part in the fighting that breached this line and later that month crossed the border into the Baltic states. Shortly thereafter the division was awarded a battle honor for its part in the conquering of Rezekne, Latvia:

"REZEKNE... 7th Guards Rifle Division (Major General Moskalik, Mikhail Emmanulovich)... The troops who participated in the liberation of Daugavpils and Rezekne, by the order of the Supreme High Command of July 27, 1944, and a commendation in Moscow, are given a salute of 20 artillery salvoes from 224 guns.

By the beginning of August, 10th Guards Army was redeployed somewhat northwards to the area of Kārsava, from where it advanced westward into Latvia over the next six weeks, reaching Lubāna by mid-September. By the start of October the 7th Guards was on the approaches to Riga, north of the Daugava River, and distinguished itself in the fighting for this city from October 13-15; in recognition, on November 3 it was awarded the Order of the Red Banner.

During this fighting two officers of the division were killed in action in circumstances that would be recognized by being made Heroes of the Soviet Union. Guards Cpt. Vladimir Vladimirovich Bogatkin was the commander of the 1st Guards Antitank Battalion and led his unit through August in aggressive direct support fire in attacking several towns in Latvia and providing protection against several German counterattacks. He was killed on August 30 and awarded the Gold Star on June 29, 1945. Guards Jr. Lt. Boris Alekseevich Lebedev commanded a rifle platoon of the 14th Guards Rifle Regiment. In the fighting for the village of Jaunpils near Tukums. He led his troops in suppressing seven German firing points, and on the night of September 26, in order to secure the advance of his men he used his body to block the embrasure of a bunker. He was awarded the Gold Star on March 24, 1945.

10th Guards moved to the Kurland Group in Leningrad Front in March, where it remained for the duration. Following the German surrender the division carried the full title: 7th Guards Rifle, Rezekne, Order of the Red Banner Division. (Russian: 7-я гвардейская стрелковая Режицкая Краснознаменная дивизия.) It was stationed at Pärnu still with the 7th Guards Corps of the 10th Guards Army before being disbanded in 1946.
