= 1st Guards Motor Rifle Division =

Motor rifle division of the Soviet military

1st Moscow Rifle Division (c. 1926–27 – 1940) 1st Moscow Motor Rifle Division (1940–1941) 1st Guards Moscow Motor Rifle Division (1941–1943) 1st Guards Moscow Rifle Division (1943–1957) 1st Guards Moscow Motor Rifle Division (1957–2002) 7th Independent Guards Motor Rifle Regiment (2002–Present)
- Active: 1926–Present
- Country: Soviet Union (1918–1920, 1926–1991); Russia (1991–2002)
- Branch: Red Army (1918–1920, 1926–1946); Soviet Army (1946-1992); Russian Ground Forces (1992–2002)
- Type: Mechanized infantry
- Size: Division
- Part of: 11th Guards Army (1945–1998)
- Engagements: World War II
- Decorations: Order of Lenin; Order of the Red Banner (2); Order of Suvorov 2nd class; Order of Kutuzov 2nd Class
- Battle honours: Moscow; Minsk

The 1st Guards Proletarian Moscow-Minsk Order of Lenin, twice Red Banner Orders of Suvorov (II) and Kutuzov (II) Motor Rifle Division (Russian: 1-я гвардейская мотострелковая Пролетарская Московско-Минская ордена Ленина, дважды Краснознаменная, орденов Суворова и Кутузова дивизия (2-е формирование)) was a division of the Red Army and Russian Ground Forces active from 1926 to 2002.

== History ==
=== Interwar period ===
The order forming the Moscow Proletarian Rifle Division was issued on 31 December 1926. The division was formed with three rifle brigades and a separate squadron with formation to be completed by 1 February 1927, from separate units of the Moscow garrison in the Moscow Military District. The Separate Moscow Rifle Regiment, formed in 1924, became the 1st Rifle Regiment. The training rifle battalion of the Vystrel course was reorganized into the 1st Battalion of the 2nd Rifle Regiment, the 1st Separate Local Rifle Battalion reorganized into the 1st Battalion of the 3rd Rifle Regiment, the 20th Separate Local Rifle Battalion became the 2nd Battalion of the 3rd Rifle Regiment, and the Separate Training Squadron at the Red Army Military Academy reorganized into the division's separate squadron.

Pavel Batov was a battalion and then regiment commander in the division in the late 1920s.

The division was numbered as the 1st Moscow Proletarian Rifle Division on 21 May 1936. In honor of its tenth anniversary and "successes in combat and political training" the division was awarded the Honorary Revolutionary Red Banner on 28 December, thus becoming the 1st Moscow Proletarian Red Banner Rifle Division. On 22 April 1938 the division was renamed the 1st Moscow Red Banner Rifle Division.

The division was expanded to form the new 115th and 126th Rifle Divisions on 7 September 1939, and the new 1st Moscow Red Banner Rifle Division was formed from its 6th Red Banner Rifle Regiment. The 1st Rifle Division was reorganized as the 1st Motorized Division on 7 December 1939.

=== World War II ===
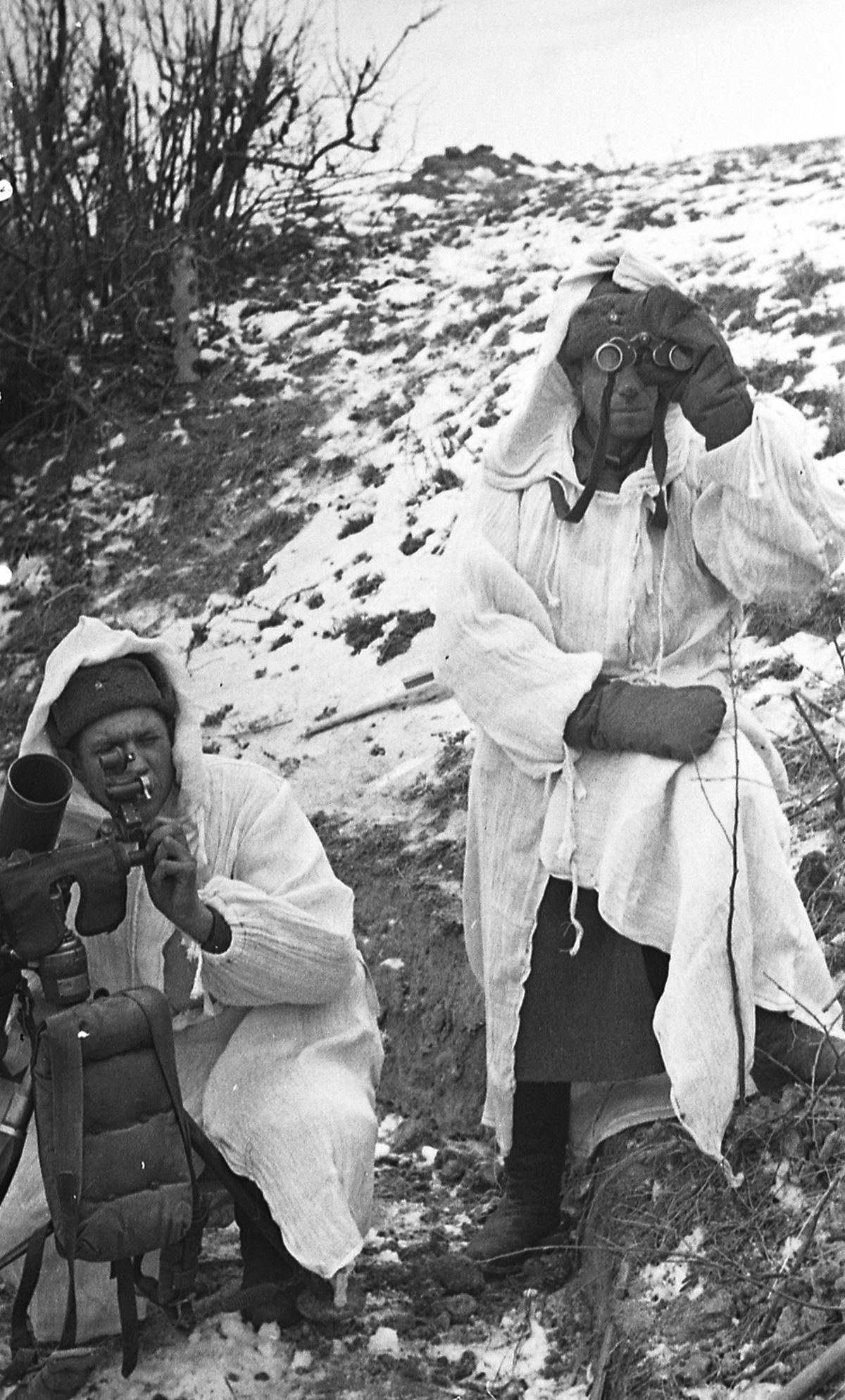
Mortarmen of the mortar company of the division's 175th Motor Rifle Regiment, November 1941. On the right, platoon commander Lieutenant Dmitry Mikhailovich Kiriltsev (killed 7 February 1942) conducts observation

It was re-raised from its single remaining regiment in September 1939 (second formation), and by January 1940 was re-formed as the 1st Moscow Motor Rifle Division. Training was complete 7 June 1940, and 1st Moscow Motor Rifle Division took part in Soviet occupation of the Baltic states since 15 June 1940, advancing from base in Polotsk and forward positions at Widze to Panevėžys 16 June 1940. After a month-long garrison duty in Panevėžys and 2-month long garrisoning of Daugavpils, the 1st Moscow Motor Rifle Division was returned to Russia. For the actions during Soviet occupation of the Baltic states, the 6th motorized rifle regiment was awarded Order of the Red Star 22 February 1941.

==== Eastern Front (World War II) ====
===== Before annihilation near Smolensk =====
- On 22 June 1941 it was part of the 7th Mechanised Corps, alongside the 14th and 18th tank divisions in the Moscow Military District, assigned to the 20th Army.
- 23 June 1941, the 1st Moscow Motor Rifle Division was replenished to the full strength of 10831 men. It was the first Soviet formation to use T-34 tanks, at Borisov, on June 30, 1941. Yartsevo in Sep 1941.
- 11 July 1941, after suffering heavy losses, the 1st Moscow Motor Rifle Division was moved to the reserve of 20th army and placed north of Orsha, and was completely encircled by the German forces 14 July 1941.
- 25 July 1941, the elements of 6th and 175th motor rifle regiments of 1st Moscow Motor Rifle Division break encirclement near Mogilev, but have suffered more losses in the heavy rearguard fighting by 30 July 1941. During that period, heavy personnel flow left few if any of the initial combatants.
- By 5 August 1941, remnants of the 1st Moscow Motor Rifle Division were wiped out after being encircled again in Smolensk region, in unclear circumstances.

===== After annihilation near Smolensk =====
5 August 1941, the 1st Moscow Motor Rifle Division was re-formed anew within 20th army, 18 August 1941 renamed "1st Tank Division" and on September 21, 1941, it was renamed the "1st Guards Moscow Motor Rifle Division". The division was renamed (again) as the "1st Guards Rifle Division", in January 1943.

- On 30 August 1941, the 1st Tank Division was participating in the Yelnya Offensive, forcing back 28th Jäger Division. Due heavy losses, the division was stopped advancing 10 September 1941 and was withdrawn to behind of Vop River.
- On 18 September 1941, the 1st Tank Division was withdrawn to Mozhaysk for replenishment and subordinated directly to Stavka.
- On 30 September 1941, the 1st Guards Moscow Motor Rifle Division was assigned to the 40th Army and sent to Sumy region. After initial advances, the 1st Guards Moscow Motor Rifle Division started to retreat 6 October 1941 as First Battle of Kharkov was being lost by Soviet forces. After losing Sumy 10 October 1941, the division was withdrawn to the reserve and sent back to Moscow.
- On 21 October 1941, the division was assigned to 33rd army and arrived to Naro-Fominsk. The 1st Guards Moscow Motor Rifle Division lost 70% of personnel in urban warfare before retreating from Naro-Fominsk on 25 October, and subsequent attempts to rettake Naro-Fominsk on 28 October failed. The division remained in the Naro-Fominsk area until end of November 1941.
- On 29 January 1942, the division liberated the village of Myatlevo along with the 415th Rifle Division during the winter counteroffensive in front of Moscow.
- In 1942, the 1st Guards Moscow Motor Rifle Division was participating in Battle of Rzhev.
- In July 1943, the 1st Guards Rifle Division was participating in Operation Kutuzov, in October 1943 - in Bryansk offensive, and in December 1943 - in Gorodok offensive.
- From January–July 1944, the 1st Guards Rifle Division advanced in the Vitebsk - Minsk direction with heavy fighting, and was awarded 'Minsk' honorific 13 July 1944.
- In November 1944, the division advanced into East Prussia in the Gusev area, and stormed Königsberg in April 1945.
- 21-26 April 1945, the 1st Guards Rifle Division concluded operations by storming Baltiysk as part of 11th Guards Army of the 3rd Belorussian Front.

== Post war ==
The division was stationed in Kaliningrad during the postwar period as part of the 11th Guards Army. It became the 1st Guards Moscow Motorised Rifle Division (again) in 1957. The 171st Guards Regiment became the 12th Guards Motorised Rifle Regiment in March 1959. The division was truncated virtually all the time (serving as a low-strength cadre formation).

For much of the 1990s the division was reduced to a strength of only 4,400 men, and in 2002 was reduced in size again to the 7th Separate Guards Motor Rifle Regiment, and, c. 2009-10 was reduced in size yet again and renamed as the 7th Independent "Proletarian Moscow-Minsk" Guards Motorized Rifle Regiment of the Baltic Fleet (Russian: отдельный гвардейский Пролетарский Московско-Минский ордена Ленина дважды Краснознаменный орденов Суворова и Кутузова мотостерлковый полк БФ).

== Commanders ==
The division had the following commanders:

- Georgy Mikhailovsky (26 December 1926–20 June 1930)
- Semyon Bely (acting, 20 June–1 July 1930)
- Grigory Kulik (1 July–11 October 1930)
- Nikolay Artemenko (15 October 1930–1 November 1931)
- Rafail Khmelnitsky (1 November 1931–4 November 1934)
- Aleksandr Kuksha (November–20 December 1934)
- Komdiv Leonid Petrovsky (17 December 1934 – June 1937, made komdiv 26 November 1935)
- Komdiv Vasily Morozov (4 June 1937–14 August 1939)
- Colonel Ivan Birichev (19 August 1939–17 June 1940, kombrig 4 November 1939, major general 4 June 1940)
- Major General Dmitry Lelyushenko (23 June 1940–10 March 1941)
- Colonel Yakov Kreizer (11 March–12 July 1941)
- Colonel Vladimir Gluzdovsky (15–27 July 1941)
- Major Dmitry Mikhailovsky (27 July–3 August 1941, acting)
- Major General Yakov Kreizer (3–29 August 1941, made major general 7 August)
- Colonel Aleksandr Lizyukov (29 August–30 November 1941)
- Colonel Timofey Novikov (30 November–15 December 1941)
- Colonel Dmitry Bakhmetyev (15–17 December 1941, acting)
- Colonel Sergey Iovlev (17 December 1941–17 January 1942)
- Colonel Timofey Novikov (17 January–15 February 1942, major general 20 January)
- Colonel Pavel Afonin (15–24 February 1942, acting)
- Colonel Vasily Revyakin (24 February–13 April 1942)
- Colonel Artemy Kholodny (13–20 April 1942)
- Lieutenant Colonel Vladimir Ratner (20 April–1 June 1942)
- Major General Vasily Revyakin (1 June–3 December 1942)
- Colonel Nikolay Kropotin (3 December 1942–17 February 1944, major general 29 January 1943)
- Colonel Pavel Palchikov (18 February–6 March 1944)
- Colonel Pavel Tolstikov (7 March–20 July 1944)
- Major General Aleksandr Pastrevich (21 July–3 August 1944)
- Lieutenant Colonel Sergey Portnov (4 August–10 September 1944)
- Colonel Pavel Tolstikov (11 September 1944–21 October 1947, major general 20 April 1945)
- Major General Vasily Shulga (10 June 1948–11 January 1951)
- Major General Vasily Belonogov (11 January–25 December 1951)
- Colonel Anatoly Bankuzov (25 December 1951–14 June 1956, major general 3 August 1953)
- Colonel Ivan Chasha (July 1956–19 May 1959, major general 27 August 1957)
- Colonel Anatoly Klyuyev (19 May 1959–23 August 1961, major general 9 May 1961)
- Colonel Nikolay Chigogidze (23 August 1961–November 1966, major general 13 April 1964)
- Colonel Ivan Kulikov (November 1966–June 1971, major general 23 February 1967)
- Colonel Fyodor Bondarenko (June 1971–19 November 1973)
- Colonel Albert Zlobin (19 November 1973–November 1976, major general 25 April 1975)
