= 215th Rifle Division =

WWII Red Army military unit

215th Motorized Division (11 March 1941 – 19 September 1941) 215th Rifle Division (May 1942 – 30 April 1955)
- Active: 1941–1956; 1941–1942 (48th Rifle Brigade); 1955–1956 (33rd Rifle Division)
- Country: Soviet Union
- Branch: Red Army / Soviet Army
- Type: Infantry
- Size: Division
- Engagements: World War II
- Decorations: Order of the Red Banner; Order of Suvorov, 2nd class; Order of Kutuzov, 2nd class
- Battle honours: Smolensk

Commanders
- Notable commanders: Andranik Ghazaryan

The 215th Rifle Division (Russian: 215-я стрелковая дивизия) was an infantry division of the Red Army during World War II that continued to serve in the Soviet Army during the early years of the Cold War. It was the successor to a motorized division of that same number that was destroyed during the Battle of Kiev in September 1941.

Formed as the 48th Rifle Brigade in late 1941, it fought in the Toropets–Kholm Offensive and was reorganized as the 215th Rifle Division in May 1942. The division fought in the Battles of Rzhev until March 1943 and in the Battle of Smolensk, receiving the name of Smolensk as an honorific for its participation in the capture of the city. Advancing into eastern Belorussia in late 1943, the division fought in a series of stalemated offensives before participating in Operation Bagration during mid-1944. Receiving the Order of the Red Banner for its actions in the capture of Vilnius, the 215th advanced into East Prussia in late 1944 and in early 1945 fought in the East Prussian Offensive. For its actions in the latter, the division received the Order of Suvorov, 2nd class. After the Samland Offensive, the division was railed from East Prussia to the Soviet Far East to participate in the Soviet invasion of Manchuria. The 215th received its final decoration, the Order of Kutuzov, 2nd class, for its actions in the latter. Postwar, it remained in the Soviet Far East and was briefly renumbered as the 33rd Rifle Division in 1955 before being disbanded a year later.

== 215th Motorized Division ==
This division began forming in March-April 1941 at Rivne in the Kiev Special Military District as part of the 22nd Mechanized Corps. It was based on the 15th Motorized Rifle Brigade. Col. Pavlin Andreevich Barabanov was appointed to command on March 11 and he would remain in this position until the division was disbanded. Once formed its order of battle was as follows:

- 707th Motorized Rifle Regiment
- 711th Motorized Rifle Regiment
- 133rd Tank Regiment
- 667th Artillery Regiment
- 41st Antitank Battalion
- 211th Antiaircraft Battalion
- 284th Reconnaissance Battalion
- 386th Light Engineering Battalion
- 585th Signal Battalion
- 213th Artillery Park Battalion
- 359th Medical/Sanitation Battalion
- 677th Motor Transport Battalion
- 158th Repair and Restoration Battalion
- 35th Regulatory Company
- 465th Chemical Defense (Anti-gas) Company
- 742nd Field Postal Station
- 557th Field Office of the State Bank

The 133rd fielded a total of 129 BT tanks, and the 677th was equipped with a total of 24 122mm howitzers, while the 211th had just four 37mm guns. Even by the time of the German invasion it was suffering crippling shortages of specialized personnel. The tank regiment and reconnaissance battalion were short about 70 percent of their required officers while the maintenance and supply echelons were missing almost 75 percent of their mechanics and technicians.

=== Battle of Brody ===
When Operation Barbarossa began on June 22 the 22nd Mechanized Corps (19th and 41st Tank Divisions, 215th Motorized Division, 23rd Motorcycle Regiment) was under command of the 5th Army of the redesignated Southwestern Front. The 215th was still positioned at Rivne with the 19th Tanks deployed somewhat to the northwest but the 41st Tanks was all the way forward to the frontier north of Volodymyr. The division went into action on June 23 after moving west along with 19th Tanks to link up with the 41st east of Svynaryn. The divisions were facing the 14th Panzer Division as it drove toward Lutsk. By the end of the day on June 27 the German division had captured that city as well as Rozhyshche despite the resistance of the now-depleted 22nd Mechanized. The fragility of the 215th was exposed by a report from 5th Army at this time that the division had "apparently only remnants" left. By July 1 it had been withdrawn with 19th Tanks to north of Klevan.

=== Battle of Kiev ===
Despite its difficulties a steady trickle of reinforcements and replacements kept a small cadre of the division in action with 22nd Mechanized. As of July 10 it was still under 5th Army's command, and was moving back to the fighting front to face Leibstandarte SS Adolf Hitler southwest of Volodarsk-Volynskyi before being driven back to the northeast over the following days. It continued its fighting withdrawal into the second week of August, pulling back past Malyn by the 11th. The division was officially redesignated as the 215th Rifle Division on August 22. At this time it had roughly 1,200 personnel still on strength with eight repaired T-37 tankettes and a dozen each of artillery pieces and mortars. The persistent resistance of 5th Army in the fastnesses of the eastern Pripyat marshes on the flanks of both Army Groups Center and South was influencing German strategy and was one reason for Hitler's decision to divert Panzer Group 2 southward to encircle Southwestern Front at and east of Kiev. At the start of this operation the 215th, which had been detached from 22nd Mechanized Corps, was positioned at Sorokoshichi on the Dniepr north of Kiev, very deep within the developing pocket. It had no chance to escape under circumstances and was officially written off on September 19.

== History ==
The division was formed in the Ural Military District during October 1941 as the 48th Separate Cadet Rifle Brigade, under the command of Colonel Andrey Kupriyanov from 25 October. After completing its formation, the brigade was sent to the Northwestern Front, joining the 4th Shock Army to fight in the Toropets–Kholm Offensive. After the army transferred to the Kalinin Front on 22 January, the 48th fought in defensive battles near Velizh.

During May 1942, the brigade was used to form the 215th Rifle Division near Ponizovye (30 kilometers from Troitsa) in the reserve of the Kalinin Front, with Kupriyanov continuing in command of the division. The 215th included the 618th, 707th, and 711th Rifle Regiments, the 667th Artillery Regiment, the 421st Anti-Tank Battalion, and the 421st Communications Company. A month after its first commander was appointed in mid-May, the division was assigned to the 58th Army. In the following month, it was transferred to the 22nd Army, creating a temporary defensive line from Yefremov Gora to Ponizovye and strengthening the forward portion of the main defensive line near Bukharin, Verkh-Goritsa, and Plyushchevo while defending positions near Nelidovo. The division became part of the 30th Army of the Western Front in mid-August, fighting to capture strongpoints on the left bank of the Volga, northwest of Rzhev. Crossing the Volga on 9 September, the 215th fought on the approaches to Rzhev but was stymied by German defenses. Kupriyanov, now a major general, was awarded the Order of the Red Banner for his leadership of the division in actions between August and October, in which it was credited with destroying up to two German infantry regiments and fifteen tanks.

When German forces began withdrawing from the Rzhev salient, the 30th Army advanced in pursuit from 2 March 1943. The division helped capture Rzhev on the next day and by 19 March it had reached the approaches to the road junction at the village of Novo-Lytkino. Kupriyanov was killed on 20 March in a German artillery bombardment that struck the village where his headquarters was located. He was replaced by Major General Sergey Iovlev. The 215th remained with the 30th Army until April, when it transferred to the 31st Army, with which it served until the end of 1943. With the 31st Army, the division advanced as part of the 36th Rifle Corps during the Smolensk–Roslavl Offensive, participating in the capture of Smolensk and the crossing of the Sozh River. For its actions in the capture of Smolensk, the division received the name of the city as an honorific on 25 September.

At the end of 1943, the 215th was transferred to the 33rd Army. Iolev was replaced by Major General Andranik Ghazaryan, a Hero of the Soviet Union, in early April. The division was transferred to the 39th Army of the Western Front (the 3rd Belorussian Front from 23 April) on 16 April, and in early May took up defensive position near Vitebsk. Just before the beginning of Operation Bagration in late June, the division became part of the 72nd Rifle Corps of the 5th Army. It fought in the Vitebsk–Orsha Offensive and the Vilnius Offensive during Operation Bagration, pursuing retreating German troops and crossing the Berezina River, capturing Borisov, Vilnius, and Kaunas. For its "exemplary fulfillment of command tasks" in the capture of Vilnius the 215th received the Order of the Red Banner on 25 July. By the end of the summer offensive in August, the average rifle company in the division was reduced to 70 men, about half strength.

The division was placed in the second echelon of the 72nd Rifle Corps between 3 September and 16 October, then fought in the Gumbinnen Offensive. It defended positions near Pillkallen between 28 October and 13 January 1945 before fighting in the East Prussian Offensive and the Insterburg–Königsberg Offensive. For its actions in the former, the division received the Order of Suvorov, 2nd class on 19 February. The process of attrition continued: by March 1945, after the East Prussian Offensive, the division fielded 2,873 officers and men. Between late March and early April, the 215th marched from Valitnik, 15 kilometers northwest of Königsberg to fight in the Samland Offensive. With the 5th Army, it was transferred to the Reserve of the Supreme High Command on 20 April and began relocating to the Soviet Far East for the Soviet invasion of Manchuria. The division began loading into rail cars on 22 April.

=== Soviet invasion of Manchuria ===
The 5th Army completed its move to the Far East by July, with the 215th part of the 72nd Rifle Corps together with the 63rd and 277th Rifle Divisions. The 215th fought in the Harbin–Jilin Operation during the latter with its corps and army, part of the 1st Far East Front. Breaking through Japanese border fortifications, the division pursued retreating Japanese troops and captured Dunhua. After the end of Japanese resistance, the division guarded the railway at Dunhua, Jiaohe, and Jilin, along with factories in the area. It was awarded the Order of Kutuzov, 2nd class, on 19 September for its actions in the capture of Jilin. Postwar, the 215th was stationed in Primorsky Krai with its corps and army; Ghazaryan remained in command until about October 1947. It was renumbered as the 33rd Rifle Division on 30 April 1955, stationed at Krasny Kut. It was disbanded there on 25 July 1956.
