= Slastukha =

Slastukha Сластуха
- Selo
- Interactive map of Slastukha
- Location within Saratov Oblast Location within Russia
- Coordinates: 51°57′03″N 44°32′36″E
- Country: Russia
- Federal subject: Saratov Oblast

Population
  - Estimate (2010): 650 )
- Time zone: UTC+4 (MSK+1)
- Postal code: 412132
- OKTMO ID: 63616464101

Slastukha (Russian: Сластуха) is a village in Yekaterinovsky District of Saratov Oblast, Russia. It is the administrative center of the Slastukhinskoye Rural Settlement.

== History ==
The village was founded in the 18th century. By the early 2000s, it included a school and a house of culture, among other buildings. It is the center of the Yekaterinovsky Agricultural Production Cooperative.

== Geography ==
Slastukha is located southeast of and on the left bank of the Atkara in the southeastern part of the district, 20 kilometres (12 mi) from the district center of Yekaterinovka. The Vyazovsky forest is located 2 kilometres (1.2 mi) east of the village.

== Demographics ==
According to the 2010 census, its population was 650, a decrease from the 671 recorded in the 2002 census. The gender makeup of the village was 49.5% male and 50.5% female.
