= 126th Rifle Division =

126th Rifle Division (August 14, 1939 – December 13, 1941) 126th Rifle Division (September 1, 1941 – 1946)
- Active: 1939–1946
- Country: Soviet Union
- Branch: Red Army (1939-46)
- Type: Infantry
- Size: Division
- Engagements: Soviet occupation of Latvia in 1940; Operation Barbarossa; Baltic operation Battle of Smolensk (1941); Battle of Moscow; Battle of Stalingrad; Operation Uranus; Operation Winter Storm; Battle of Rostov (1943); Mius-Front; Donbas strategic offensive (July 1943); Donbas strategic offensive (August 1943); Melitopol offensive Crimean offensive Baltic offensive Šiauliai offensive Operation Doppelkopf; East Prussian offensive Battle of Königsberg; Samland offensive
- Decorations: Order of the Red Banner (2); Order of Suvorov (all 2nd Formation)
- Battle honours: Gorlovka (2nd Formation)

Commanders
- Notable commanders: Komdiv Nikolai Aleksandrovich Sokolov; Maj. Gen. Mikhail Andreevich Kuznetsov; Col. Efim Vasilevich Bedin; Col. Vladimir Evseevich Sorokin; Col. Dmitrii Semyonovich Kuropatenko; Maj. Gen. Fyodor Nazarovich Parkhomenko; Maj. Gen. Aleksandr Ignatevich Kazartsev; Col. Aleksandr Ignatevich Kazakov; Col. Ivan Ivanovich Vasilenko; Col. Fyodor Andreevich Safronov

The 126th Rifle Division was first formed as an infantry division of the Red Army on August 14, 1939, in the Moscow Military District, based on the shtat (table of organization and equipment) of the following month. In June 1940 it made up part of the force that occupied Latvia. It remained in the occupied Baltic states, being assigned to 11th Army in Lithuania in early 1941. At the start of the German invasion it was in the vicinity of Kaunas and was struck on the opening day, suffering heavy losses, then forced to retreat to the east, soon being reassigned to Northwestern Front's 27th Army. Shortly after it was moved to 22nd Army of Western Front, and fought under those commands near Velikiye Luki and Toropets, escaping from encirclement in the process. After retreating past Andreapol the front stabilized and during September the 126th was substantially rebuilt, but lost much of its strength when it was again encircled in the early part of Operation Typhoon. After escaping it was reassigned to 16th Army, but in November it was decided to use its remaining assets to reinforce other units of the Army and on December 13 it was disbanded.

A new division named after Marshal K. E. Voroshilov began forming on September 1, 1941, in the Far Eastern Military District and in January 1942 it was redesignated as the new 126th. It remained in the Far East until May when it was moved west, eventually arriving south of Stalingrad as the German drive on the city was well underway. In early August it was assigned to 64th Army in Southeastern Front, battling against the 4th Panzer Army and gradually being pushed to the outskirts of the city while taking very heavy casualties. During September and October it fought positional battles in the Beketovka bridgehead south of the city while rebuilding its strength, now as part of Stalingrad Front, but in preparation for Operation Uranus it was shifted well to the south, joining 51st Army, which was facing the forces that were about to become Romanian 4th Army. The division successfully smashed through the Romanian positions on the first day of the offensive then advanced to the southwest, helping to form the outer encirclement front but soon coming under attack from 4th Panzer as it attempted to relieve the Stalingrad pocket. After the failure of Operation Winter Storm the division with its Army began a counteroffensive toward Rostov-on-Don as part of Southern Front. Once that city was liberated in mid-February 1943 the division advanced to the Mius River, where it encountered the defenses erected by Army Group South after first losing Rostov in December 1941. It was halted along this line and spent several months in a much-needed replenishment, during which it was reassigned to 5th Shock Army. Under this command it took part in both the abortive July offensive and the successful August offensive into the Donbas, and was awarded a battle honor. Returning to 51st Army it played a key role in the capture of Melitopol and was awarded its first Order of the Red Banner. Following this it advanced with the rest of the now-4th Ukrainian Front to the approaches to the Crimea, but stalled there during the winter of 1943/44, being reassigned to 2nd Guards Army in February. In April it took part in the offensive that pushed through the Isthmus of Perekop, winning the Order of Suvorov in the process, and then in the recapture of Sevastopol, for which it was awarded a second Order of the Red Banner. With the conclusion of this campaign it left 4th Ukrainian with its Army and was sent well to the north, joining 1st Baltic Front in July during its advance into the Baltic states. Two of its regiments distinguished themselves in the fighting around Šiauliai but also suffered heavy losses. In November it was transferred to 43rd Army, which itself was moved to 3rd Belorussian Front after the start of the invasion of East Prussia. In February 1945 it was briefly reassigned to 39th Army, but soon returned to the 43rd for the duration of the war. During early April it played a leading role in the storming of Königsberg, for which several of its subunits would receive decorations. With 43rd Army the 126th was reassigned to 2nd Belorussian Front in the last days of the war, and this became the Northern Group of Forces postwar. In December the division returned to the Crimea, where it was converted to a mechanized division in 1946. However, during further reorganizations over the following decades the "126th" number reappeared until the division was finally disbanded in 1996.

== 1st Formation ==
The division was formed at Moscow in the Moscow Military District on August 14, 1939, based on a cadre from the elite 1st Moscow Rifle Division's 2nd Rifle Regiment. Komdiv Nikolai Aleksandrovich Sokolov, who had been serving as deputy commander of the 68th Mountain Rifle Division, was given command within days but was moved to the 11th Rifle Division on February 4, 1940. The division saw several more changes of command until January 27, 1941, when Maj. Gen. Mikhail Andreevich Kuznetsov took over. In mid-June, 1940, it was part of the force that occupied Latvia. At the time of the German invasion on June 22, 1941, the division was under direct command of 11th Army. Its order of battle was as follows:

- 366th Rifle Regiment
- 539th Rifle Regiment (later 690th)
- 550th Rifle Regiment
- 358th Light Artillery Regiment (until October 30, 1941)
- 501st Howitzer Artillery Regiment (until October 25, 1941)
- 426th Howitzer Artillery Regiment (from October 10, 1941)
- 265th Antitank Battalion
- 286th Antiaircraft Battalion (later 240th)
- 198th Reconnaissance Battalion
- 175th Sapper Battalion
- 233rd Signal Battalion
- 222nd Medical/Sanitation Battalion (later 212th)
- 130th Chemical Defense (Anti-gas) Company
- 101st Motor Transport Company (later 230th Battalion)
- 195th Field Bakery
- 873rd Field Postal Station
- 139th Field Office of the State Bank

At this time it was near the left flank of the Baltic Special Military District with its main forces in the Žiežmariai area, tying in to the 128th Rifle Division on its left flank and the 188th Rifle Division on its right.

The District commander, Col. Gen. F. I. Kuznetsov, had disregarded the instructions of the NKO and General Staff to avoid any action that might be taken as a provocation. On June 15, alarmed by intelligence reports of the German buildup, issued orders to increase force readiness along the frontier. Without directly mentioning the buildup he stated, "Today, as never before, we must be fully combat ready. Many commanders do not understand this. But all must firmly and clearly understand that at any moment we must be ready to fulfill any combat mission." After receiving further intelligence two days later Kuznetsov ordered his forces to full military readiness on June 18. While his actions were brave in going against orders from the top and militarily correct, it's unlikely that they made any real difference when the war began.

At the outset of the invasion the division had a mixed regiment, consisting of 3rd Battalion, 550th Regiment, 2nd Battalion, 366th Regiment, and 3rd Battalion, 539th Regiment, plus part of the divisional artillery deployed forward to the frontier. The remainder was preparing for a march to woods near Prienai for field exercises. Before this could begin the mixed regiment was struck by the VI Army Corps and largely destroyed, while the XXXIX Motorized Corps forced a gap between the 126th and 128th. Jr. Sgt. Sergei Matsapoura, a gun layer in the 358th Artillery, recalled:

We soon found ourselves firing at the Fascist infantry from maximum range. As soon as a salvo of shells had been fired, the command came: "Stop! Record the settings." That morning, at Lieutenant Komarov's battery, I first heard a phrase that would be repeated time and again: "Spare the ammunition!" The border was west of us, but by noon we were firing in a southerly direction. I remember that because the midday sun shone straight into the barrel of my cannon. The fact that our battery had swung first south, and then southeast, meant only one thing: the Fascists had penetrated deep into Soviet territory.

By the evening, 11th Army had been largely encircled or scattered. While most remaining formations retreated to the north the 126th was forced off to the east of Kaunas, and by July 10 it had been reassigned to 27th Army along the Daugava River, near Dzisna, with less than 2,000 men remaining under command. Within this Army it was subordinated to the 29th Rifle Corps.

=== Battles for Nevel and Velikiye Luki ===
Vitebsk fell on July 11, and 29th Corps was soon transferred to Lt. Gen. F. A. Ershakov's 22nd Army of Western Front which was attempting to hold what remained of the Daugava line from the Polotsk Fortified Region east toward Haradok. The 126th was reported as fighting along a line from Ignatovko to Kulikovo. The Front commander, Marshal S. K. Timoshenko, issued orders late on July 12 for Ershakov to carry out a counterattack the following morning with two divisions and supporting artillery from the Haradok area south toward Vitebsk. This plan was stillborn when the LVII Motorized Corps, backed by the L and XXIII Army Corps drove the Army from its defenses along the Dvina northwest of Polotsk, cut it into two parts, enveloped its flanks and threatened both parts with encirclement. With only six divisions to defend a front 274 km wide Ershakov was soon in full retreat as the panzers drove northward toward Nevel.

Nevel was taken by LVII Motorized on the morning of July 16 which left 29th Corps and eight other divisions cut off and isolated between that town and Vitebsk. As the German commanders debated the size of the encircled forces and exactly how best to deal with them while also carrying out their other objectives, the divisions did their best to escape in the general direction of Velikiye Luki, aided by the difficult terrain in the region. On July 19 the 19th Panzer Division captured the city but overnight elements of 22nd Army attacked and overran the thin screen being held around Nevel by 14th Motorized Division, allowing the Army's encircled 62nd Rifle Corps to escape to the east. This pressure also forced 19th Panzer to abandon the city on July 21 and Ershakov triumphantly signalled the commander of 62nd Corps:

We have captured Velikiye Luki. 29th Rifle Corps (126th, 179th, and 214th Rifle Divisions) are attacking toward Nevel to destroy the enemy and support your withdrawal... An automobile [truck] column (50 vehicles) with ammunition, fuel, and food is being sent to you in the Zui region [35km south of Velikiye Luki]...

This overlooked victory was the first large city liberated by the Red Army. Ershakov now attempted to create a new defense line along the Lovat River although his 51st Rifle Corps had been reduced to remnants.

In the course of this fighting General Kuznetsov was organizing a counterattack near Velikiye Luki when he was severely wounded; he died of his wounds on August 6. At the time the division was entirely without organic artillery and was forced to attack without any preparation, suffering heavy casualties with no success. He was replaced on July 22 by Col. Efim Vasilevich Bedin, who had been in command of the 550th and then the 690th Rifle Regiments.

By August 21 German forces had regrouped to take back Velikiye Luki with the 19th and 20th Panzer and 256th and 102nd Infantry Divisions. Supply lines to 22nd Army were being disrupted the next day and at 1015 hours on August 24 Ershakov was forced to issue orders for his forces to break out in the direction of Toropets. In the plan for the breakout the 126th Rifle and 48th Tank Divisions were in the first echelon with the 179th and 214th in second, followed by what remained of 62nd Corps and the 170th Rifle Division as rearguard; the operation began at 2200 hours. The escaping force numbered from 15 to 20,000 men while another 25,000 of 22nd Army remained behind in small pockets south of Velikiye Luki and either fought to the death or surrendered over the following days.

=== Fall of Toropets ===
In a report from Ershakov's headquarters at 0200 hours on August 26 the XXXX Motorized Corps was said to be "attempting to fan out northeastward in the general direction of Toropets and Ostashkov with small reconnaissance groups" while the 126th and 48th Tanks were attempting to take up a defense on a line 35 km southwest of the former place. The deputy chief of staff of Western Front, Lt. Gen. G. K. Malandin, reported that as of the morning of August 28 that the 126th "has up to 3,100 men and appears better than the others, two 76mm guns and 17 machine guns", although he was apparently unaware of Kuznetsov's death. The gist of his overall message was that 22nd Army was unable to defend Toropets. Nevertheless, the remnants of 29th Corps were organized into a "Destroyer" Division to defend the Kudinovo and Shamarino sector, 35 km west-southwest of the town. The 126th was specifically assigned the line Novaya Derevnya–Staraya Toropa–Semyonovskoe.

On the same date the remnants of the Army were taken over by Maj. Gen. V. A. Yushkevich, who reported at 1700 hours that the 126th, supported by the 390th Howitzer Artillery Regiment and 179th Antitank Battalion, was defending Hill 199.2, Lake Zalikovskoe, and Zareche, while the commander of 29th Corps, Maj. Gen. A. G. Samokhin, was responsible for the sector from the lake to Toropets. The overall defense amounted to a series of company- and battalion-sized strongpoints in an arc some 8–10 km from the city. As an example of its fragility a "small enemy tank group" was reported as having penetrated at the boundary between the division and the assembling 186th Rifle Division. On August 29 the 20th Panzer Division pushed through and took Toropets. Meanwhile, the LVII Corps and XXXX Motorized advanced easily and split the defenses of 22nd Army, with both German corps continuing their advance on Andreapol and Zapadnaya Dvina on August 30. On the same day, Timoshenko sent a message to Stalin addressing the situation in the 22nd Army's sector. He stated that the 126th was fighting in the western and northeastern outskirts of Toropets, and the 48th Tanks, having lost all its vehicles, had been reorganized as a rifle division.

By August 31 the 126th and 186th had been formed into a composite group under command of Samokhin and had "passed through the Danskoe and Proskurino line [20km southwest to 20km south-southwest of Ardreapol] with its main forces at 1500 hours, while protecting its withdrawal with rearguard units along the Martisovo and Chernyshevo line." On September 1, Timoshenko again attempted to go over to the counteroffensive, aiming at Dukhovshchina with his main forces, but 22nd and 29th Armies were in no position to take part. Two days later, the 126th was reported as having been "assigned the mission to liquidate enemy forces penetrating in the Suvorovo region by combined operations with... 186th and 252nd RDs". A further report the next day stated:

126th and 186th RDs - repelled fierce enemy counterattacks at Ivanova Gora, with the town changing hands three times, but 186th Division recaptured the Ivanova Gora and Suvorovo region at 1200 hours on 4 September.

An operational summary from the Western Front at 2000 on September 5 indicated that the counteroffensive was effectively finished; the two divisions, along with a unit called Antosenko's Detachment, were said to have attacked for a second time from woods 2 km east of Suvorovo to Hill 236.2 to Frolovo to the Yaldy line (17–22 km south of Andreapol) with "unknown results". Following its victory over 22nd Army, XXXX Corps disappeared from the front lines by the first week of September. Timoshenko was so concerned about this potential threat he had his chief of staff, Lt. Gen. V. D. Sokolovskii, prepare a report which was sent to the STAVKA in the afternoon of September 10 which stated, in part:

There are four main groupings of enemy opposing the front. The first enemy grouping, which is operating at the boundary between 27th and 22nd Armies, consists of up to three divisions, one of which is pressing 256th RD back toward Peno.

On the same day, the 22nd Army was directed to create an Army reserve in the Peno region. During September 29 Corps was disbanded and the 126th came under direct Army command.

== Operation Typhoon ==
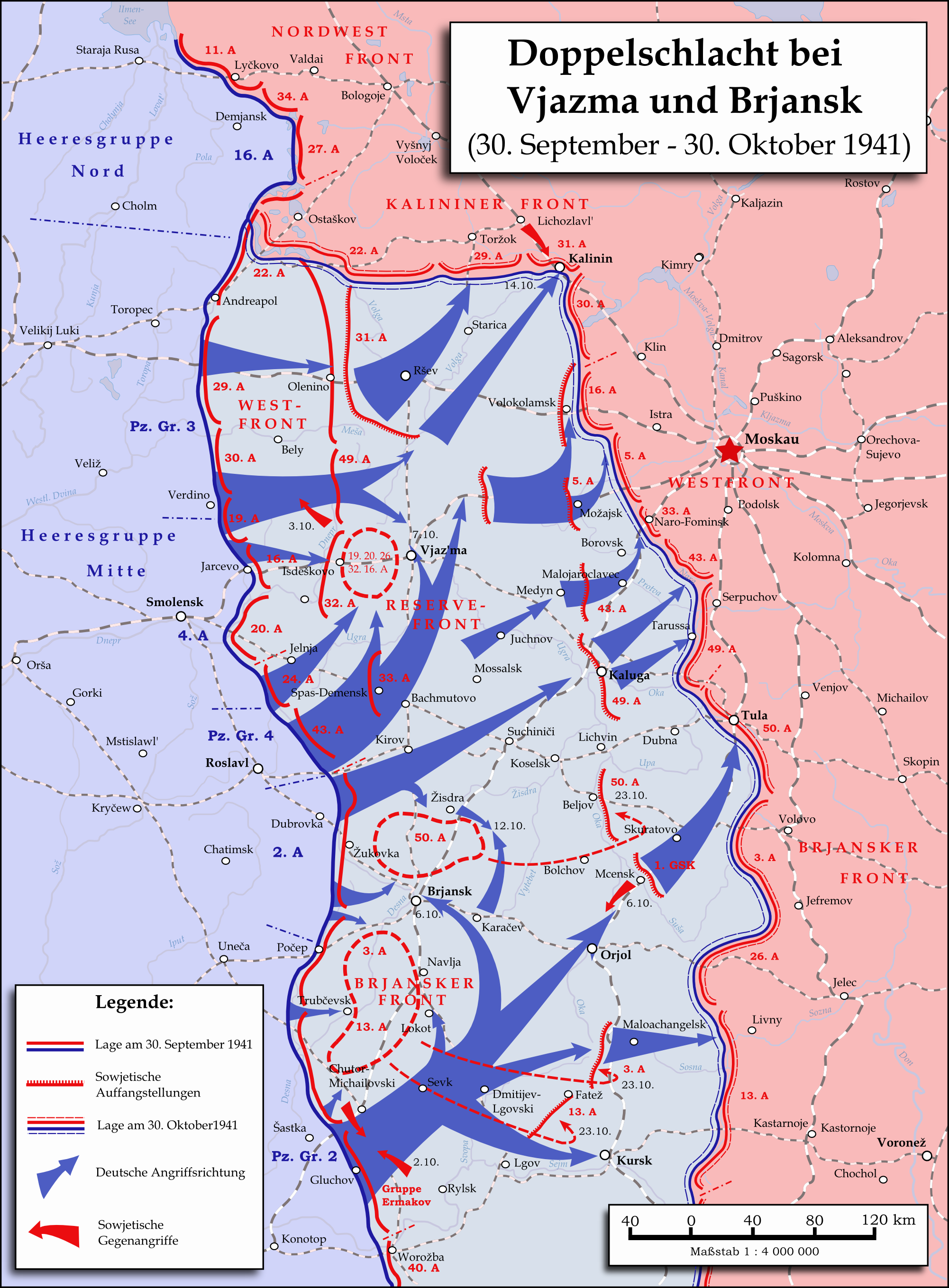
Operation Typhoon. Note positions of 22nd Army.

While the fighting shifted to other sectors during the rest of September the division had a chance to rebuild and by the start of October it was back to some 10,000 personnel. It was noted at this time that its personnel remained a mix of Uzbeks and Russians. 2nd Panzer Group began the new German offensive against Moscow on its sector on September 30 and this led to Western Front initiating a plan to reinforce its southern wing. The 126th was reassigned to 31st Army, and concentrated at its assigned entraining points by 2000 hours on October 4. By 0200 on October 5 no trains had arrived, in large part because the offensive had expanded to the north on October 2, and the lateral line behind the front was being systematically bombed. The division soon found itself surrounded with most of 22nd Army, but Colonel Bedin managed to link up with the Group under Lt. Gen. I. V. Boldin to lead a large number of his men out of the pocket into the forests north of Vyazma.

Near the end of the month the 690th Rifle Regiment was detached in order to reinforce the 316th Rifle Division near Volokolamsk, and as of October 29 the remainder of the division had fewer than 1,000 personnel on strength, plus two 120mm mortars, two 82mm mortars, four 76mm cannon, and a pair of 45mm antitank guns. On October 10 the 426th Howitzer Artillery Regiment had been added in another effort to rebuild, but this proved abortive, as the 358th Artillery Regiment left on October 30. On November 1 Bedin left and soon took command of the 7th Guards Rifle Division; he would be promoted to the rank of major general on November 27, 1942, be made a Hero of the Soviet Union in October 1943, and lead the 21st Rifle Corps from November 1943 until July 1944 when he was severely wounded. Col. Yakov Nikiforovich Vronskii took over the 126th, which was soon slated for disbandment.

The 501st Howitzer Artillery Regiment was detached on November 25 and the remaining manpower was used to reinforce various units in 16th Army. On December 13 the division was officially disbanded at Moscow.

== 2nd Formation ==
The Voroshilov Rifle Division began forming on September 1, 1941, in the 25th Army of the Far Eastern Military District. It would remain there over the following months, until January 1942 when it was redesignated as the new 126th, under command of 39th Rifle Corps. It was under command of Col. Vladimir Evseevich Sorokin, and once redesignated it had an order of battle eventually very similar to that of the 1st formation:

- 366th Rifle Regiment
- 550th Rifle Regiment
- 690th Rifle Regiment
- 358th Artillery Regiment
- 265th Antitank Battalion
- 168th Antiaircraft Battery (later 165th, until April 30, 1943)
- 191st Mortar Battalion (until December 14, 1942)
- 198th Reconnaissance Company (later 198th Battalion)
- 376th Sapper Battalion (later 175th)
- 233rd Signal Battalion (later 327th Company)
- 212th Medical/Sanitation Battalion
- 266th Chemical Defense (Anti-gas) Company
- 141st Motor Transport Company
- 280th Field Bakery
- 991st Divisional Veterinary Hospital
- 1728th Field Postal Station
- 139th Field Office of the State Bank (later 1120th)

After a lengthy period for forming up and training the division was loaded on the Trans-Siberian Railway for the west in May, eventually arriving in the 8th Reserve Army of the STAVKA Reserve by the end of June and no longer under Corps command. By now the German campaign toward Stalingrad was well underway, and the 4th Panzer Army was advancing on the city from the southwest through Abganerovo.

== Battle of Stalingrad ==
The division arrived in Stalingrad Front during July 11–14 on 18 trains and consolidated at Gumrak Station on July 26. 1st Reserve Army had been redesignated as 64th Army on July 10 and the 126th was assigned to it in the first days of August, about the time the Army came under command of Maj. Gen. M. S. Shumilov. Under the impact of the German threat, at 0530 hours on August 4 the STAVKA reorganized its defense, with Stalingrad Front being divided into Stalingrad and Southeastern Fronts, and the 126th being reassigned to 57th Army of the latter. The new Front would be led by Col. Gen. A. I. Yeryomenko, and its immediate mission was to stop further German movement toward Stalingrad from the south, as well as preventing an advance to the Volga. Four days later Stalin again adjusted his dispositions, and the division returned to Shumilov's command.

=== Battles for Abganerovo ===
The 14th Panzer Division had resumed its advance on August 5 with a thrust of 30–40 km from Aksai, reaching Abganerovo on the rail line from Stalingrad to Kotelnikovo. A Red Army General Staff report stated:

126th RD was fighting with an enemy force of up to a company of submachine gunners with 10 tanks, which had wedged into our defenses in the Abganerovo region (70 kilometres southwest of Stalingrad), on 5 August.

Yeryomenko built a second defense line along the Myshkova River, some 25–40 km to the north, after which Shumilov withdrew the units of his Army that were still holding along the Don River, deploying them around Abganerovo, directly in the path of the next German advance. August 6 saw the XXXXVIII Panzer Corps consolidating its position around that place while sending mobile groups northward toward Tinguta. As pressure grew on the 126th and its neighbouring 38th Rifle Division, both of which had minimal artillery support, Shumilov received permission to counterattack the panzer spearheads on August 9. He then reinforced his forces with three rifle divisions and the 13th Tank Corps, creating a credible counterforce. The attack struck the mobile spearheads of 14th Panzer and 29th Motorized Divisions; the 126th with 14 T-34s of 254th Tank Brigade hit the latter along the railway at 74 km Station from the west while it was also attacked from the north. These blows, including volleys from three Guards Mortar regiments at 74 km Station, took the German division by surprise and forced it to withdraw 10 km back to Abganerovo on August 10 with heavy losses. The 126th was reported as having "reached the northwestern outskirts of Abganerovo Station with its left wing by 1800 hours on 9 August." A report on August 10 stated that the division "was defending the line Hill 124.0–Svinnaia Balka–Hill 127.3–Kudomiasov Balka." The next day it was said to be

fighting fiercely with the enemy along the Kapkinskii (25 kilometres west of Abganerovo)–Hill 124.0 line. The division liquidated the enemy group penetrating in the vicinity of Katrusheva Balka and Zdaniaia Myshkova Balka regions by 1900 hours on 11 August. The remnants of the enemy have been thrown back from the forward edge of our units' defenses...

By this time 4th Panzer Army was no longer combat effective. The Abganerovo front stabilized on August 12 and stated quiet until the night of August 17/18 when renewed pressure persuaded Shumilov to withdraw his southern wing from its positions south of the Myshkova. 4th Panzer would need reinforcements before renewing its drive on Stalingrad.

=== Fighting on the Approaches ===
After a delay due to shortages of fuel and lubricants a strengthened XXXXVIII Corps, equipped with 180-200 tanks, set out at 0700 hours on August 20 to destroy 64th Army. Shumilov's force, with about 100 tanks, was deployed on a 120 km-wide front. The sector from Tinguta west to Vasilevka on the Myshkova was held by the 38th, 126th, and 204th Rifle Divisions, backed by the 29th and 138th Rifle Divisions and 154th Rifle Brigade in second echelon, plus 13th Tanks. Following a strong artillery preparation the 94th and 371st Infantry Divisions, supported by a battlegroup of 29th Motorized, advanced 4–5 km to the north, forcing the 204th and 126th to abandon their defenses at Abganerovo Station. As they fell back Shumilov reinforced them with the 29th and two brigades of 13th Tanks, allowing them to establish new defenses covering Yurkino Station. The German advance faltered late in the day due to heavy Soviet resistance.

Over the following ten days the German/Romanian forces ground forward at the junction between 64th and 57th Armies. By August 29 XXXXVIII Corps was again running out of steam but found a weak spot between Vasilevka and Abganerovo Station covered by the 126th. Even at this stage of the battle the division was missing some 80 percent of its authorized artillery. The panzers concentrated on a 15 km-wide sector, with flank protection from Romanian 2nd Infantry Division, and struck at dawn with a 4–1 advantage in infantry and total superiority in artillery and armor. The division was overwhelmed and the Axis force advanced nearly 20 km. In the confusion Colonel Sorokin was concussed and taken prisoner, and much of his command cadre was also lost. He spent most of his captivity at Hohenstein and Wülzburg, being liberated by US forces in April 1945. After a review of his case he was officially repressed in late 1948, but eventually rehabilitated 11 years later. He died in 1985 and was buried at his request in a mass grave with many of his soldiers near Volgograd. In a postwar letter Shumilov wrote to Sorokin:

... I consider myself guilty before the soldiers of the 126th Rifle Division. The division's soldiers fought heroically throughout the defense of Abganerovo. After the defeat of the Germans at Stalingrad, I did not recommend the division for promotion to Guards. I was sure the front would do it. But I didn't check. That's my guilt before the soldiers of the 126th Rifle Division...

Sorokin's deputy commander for logistics, Major Golova, took temporary command until the arrival of Col. Dmitrii Semyonovich Kuropatenko on September 3. The division had just 340 men remaining under arms. Kuropatenko had previously led the 404th and 157th Rifle Divisions.

The 6th Army and 4th Panzer Army began a renewed drive into the suburbs of Stalingrad on the same day. In the south the XXXXVIII Corps, including the 94th Infantry and Romanian 20th Infantry Division, was to attack eastward from Voroponovo Station and northeastward from Elkhi with the objective of reaching the Volga and seizing the city south of the Tsaritsa River. The initial assault by 14th Panzer and 29th Motorized west of Peschanka was repelled by 64th Army's right flank 29th, 204th, 157th and 126th. 14th Panzer attacked again at dawn on September 4 but was stalled short of Peschanka by the resistance of the 126th and 204th. These right flank divisions maintained their defense the following day although they were being worn down by the ongoing attacks; General Shumilov assembled a reserve in the Beketovka area which included the 10th Rifle Brigade.

The XXXXVIII Panzer Corps regrouped its forces on September 7 with the intention of redirecting its attack southeastward against 64th Army's right flank. Its assault resumed the next day, badly damaging the 244th Rifle Division and pressing the 126th and 204th and the reinforcing 138th Division and 133rd Tank Brigade back to new defenses southwest from the western outskirts of Peschanka. On September 9 the German forces drove southward west of Kuporosnoe, forcing the 138th, 204th and 157th Divisions to abandon Staro-Dubovka. The Soviet forces withdrew to the new defense line east and west of Gornaia Poliana, which was already manned by the 126th. During the day the remainder of 14th Panzer reinforced the assault of the 29th Motorized and while this was halted short of Kuporosnoe and the west bank of the Volga, the four rifle divisions were being rapidly eroded away.

Overnight on September 9/10 a battalion of the 29th Motorized reached the Volga south of Kuporosnoe but was thrown back in part by the 131st Rifle Division after it had been relieved at Gornaia Poliana. On September 12 the fighting for the Stalingrad suburbs reached its climax. 14th Panzer was now supported by the mixed German/Romanian IV Army Corps and probed the defenses of the 64th Army from the southwest outskirts of Kuporosnoe around to its boundary with 57th Army at Ivanovka. This position would become known as the Beketovka bridgehead.

==== Beketovka Bridgehead ====
In an NKVD report late that month the following case was reported:

Among those shot for spying, G. A. Pushkov, was a squad leader in 126th Rifle Division, who was taken prisoner by the Germans on 14 September on the outskirts... and... was recruited and received the mission of determining the locations of the large headquarters, the positions of multiple-rocket launcher sites, and the locations of the workers in the NKVD headquarters and Special Department in Stalingrad. Pushkov was detained today... and was shot after a preliminary investigation.

On October 17 Yeryomenko, now in command of Stalingrad Front, submitted a plan to the STAVKA for a further effort to break through to the encircled 62nd Army in the city, or at least to divert German forces from the battle there. The bridgehead faced the German 71st Infantry and 29th Motorized Divisions, plus part of the 371st Infantry Division, along a 9 km-wide front from south of Kuporosnoe to roughly 5 km west of Gornaya Polyana. According to the plan the Army's shock group was to penetrate the 371st and advance to the Tsaritsa River to link up with 13th Guards Rifle Division in the city center. While this was exceptionally ambitious, Yeryomenko more realistically expected to draw one infantry and one panzer division from the battle in the city.

The plan called for the shock group to be formed from the relatively fresh 93rd, 96th and 97th Rifle Brigades of 7th Rifle Corps and the 169th Rifle Division, all of which had been transferred to the Army, plus the 126th and 422nd Rifle Divisions, for a total of some 30,000 troops, backed by 80 tanks from four depleted brigades, 92 Guards mortars, and 243 guns. The force was deployed in two echelons, with the 93rd and 97th Brigades and 422nd Division, and two tank brigades in first, the 126th Division, 96th Brigade, and two tank brigades in second, and the 169th in general reserve to reinforce where and as needed. The first phase of the attack was to begin at dawn on October 23 and Yeryomenko estimated it would take 10 days to complete. In the event, due to difficulties in organization it did not kick off until 0900 hours on October 25; the 371st lost several hundred metres of ground in Kuporosnoe to the 422nd, plus as much as 2 km west of the town, but soon stabilized the situation, although fighting continued until November 1.

== Operation Uranus ==
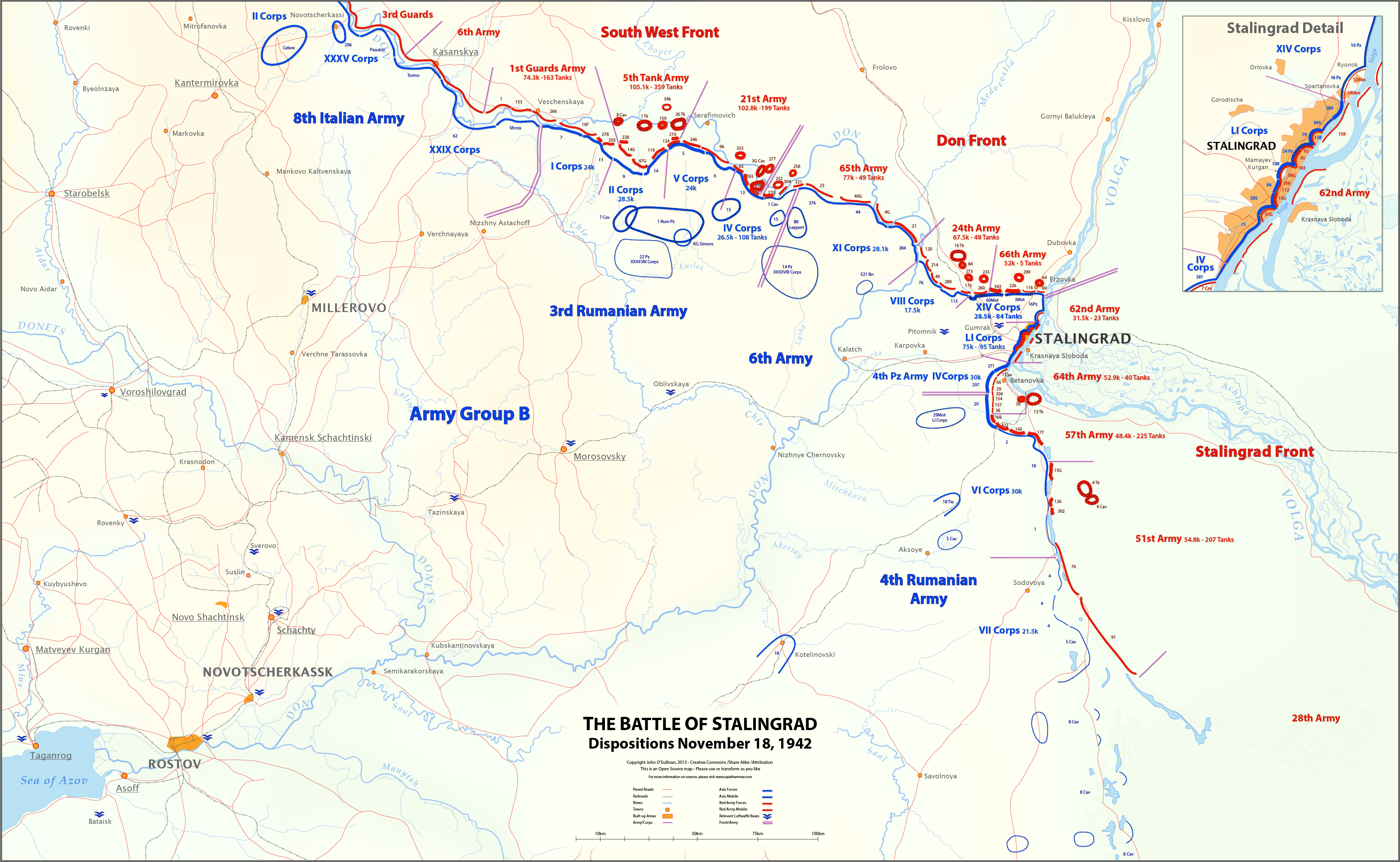
Preparations for Operation Uranus. Note positions of the 126th and 302nd Divisions in the lake region.

In preparation for the upcoming Soviet counteroffensive on November 10 the 126th was transferred to 51st Army, still in Stalingrad Front. The Army was under command of Maj. Gen. N. I. Trufanov and also contained the 15th Guards, 91st, and 302nd Rifle Divisions, plus 4th Mechanized Corps, 4th Cavalry Corps, and several other units. The Front's main attack would be carried out by 64th, 57th, and 51st Armies on a 65 km-wide front from Beketovka south to the lake region, which was mostly manned by Romanian forces of German IV Corps and Romanian VI Army Corps. The offensive punch was concentrated on three penetration sectors with a total width of 40 km. One such sector of 12 km between Lake Tsatsa and Lake Barmantsak would have the 126th and 302nd as the Army's main shock group. The Front's objective was to was to destroy Axis reserves and reach the area of Kalach after about 48 hours to link up with mobile elements of Southwestern Front to encircle 6th and 4th Panzer Armies in Stalingrad.

The orders for the 126th and 302nd were to:

Penetrate the enemy's tactical defenses at the junction between Romanian VI Army Corps' 18th and 1st Infantry Divisions and destroy the opposing enemy.
Commit the exploitation elements (4th Mechanized Corps and 4th Cavalry Corps) into the penetration at the end of the first day...
Subsequently, develop the offensive in cooperation with 57th Army to encircle the enemy west of the Volga and protect the shock group's left flank against enemy counterattack from the south and southwest.

15th Guards would conduct a secondary attack on the Army's right wing. The overall offensive would begin in phases, with Southwestern and Don Fronts attacking on November 19 and Stalingrad Front on November 20.

51st Army began its artillery preparation at 0730 hours under light fog, which limited observation and adjustment, and also prevented air support. Trufanov was joined at his observation post by N. S. Khrushchyov of the Front's Military Council, deputy Front commander Lt. Gen. M. M. Popov, and the commanders of the mobile Corps. In an effort to deceive the Romanian command as to the direction of the main attack the 15th Guards would step off at 0830 while the 126th and 302nd would do so 15 minutes later. The two divisions were supported by the 254th Tank Brigade when the attack began, facing strong resistance from several Romanian strong points manned by 1st Battalion, 93rd Regiment, and 1st and 2nd Battalions of 75th Regiment, 1st Infantry Division. At the last minute Trufanov ordered 4th Mechanized Corps to support the 302nd with its 55th Tank Regiment and the 126th with the 158th Tank Regiment, which was in direct violation of the regulations laid down for the use of tank and mechanized corps. With the tanks of 254th Brigade each division now had some 68 vehicles in direct support.

The most substantial resistance came at Hill 87.0, 7 km west of the forward edge of the Romanian front line. This was held by 1st Infantry's 2nd Battalion, 85th Regiment, along with, reportedly, a pair of batteries of 88mm anitaircraft guns with German crews. This position was on the boundary between the 126th and 302nd so both sent elements into the attack along with their direct support tanks in an effort to strike frontally and to encircle the hill. The fog lifted at 1000 hours and the Axis troops held another hour until the 55th and 158th Regiments arrived. After a 20-minute engagement the defenders began withdrawing to the west in disorder. Seeing this, General Popov contacted Yeryomenko and gained permission to commit the mobile Corps into the penetration. The 126th, with its supporting tanks, advanced westward up to 12 km by 1300, reaching the village of Bessilov. Due to traffic jams, mine clearing, and command inexperience, 4th Mechanized failed to cross its line of departure until this time, and would fall short of its first day objectives. Nevertheless, by nightfall the 1st, 2nd, and 18th Infantry Divisions had been decimated, with large numbers encircled and captured, and Romanian VI Corps was out of the battle, leaving 4th Mechanized and 4th Cavalry Corps a clear path into the Axis rear.

Operation Uranus. Note line reached by 51st Army.

The Army resumed the offensive at daybreak on November 21. The 126th marched into the area around Plodovitoe, which had been taken by 4th Mechanized, and began building an outer encirclement front with the 302nd and 4th Cavalry, which stretched from the Aksai area eastward some 60 km to Malye Derbety, 4 km south of Lake Barmantsak. 4th Cavalry seized Abganerovo in the morning, capturing 5,000 Romanians in the process. 81st Cavalry Division now moved southwest toward Aksai, while 61st Cavalry Division rode into the rear of Romanian 4th Infantry Division at Malye Derbety, which was holding up the advance of the 91st Division. Both cavalry divisions were expecting the 126th to catch up and reinforce them the next day, as the part of 4th Panzer Army that had escaped encirclement could be expected to counterattack toward the pocket.

During November 22 the two cavalry divisions continued their successful advances, while the 302nd mopped up Romanian forces from the west shore of Lake Barmantsak, then engaged the 4th Infantry near Tundutovo. To the south the 91st took up positions to the south of Lake Sarpa, anticipating the encirclement of the Romanian division in cooperation with the 61st Cavalry. Meanwhile, the 126th rounded up stragglers southwest of Lake Sarpa before moving to the west into the Verkhne-Tsaritsynskii area, 40 km southwest of Beketovka, where it relieved 4th Mechanized's 60th Mechanized Brigade. The next day the 4th Infantry and 5th Cavalry Divisions were defeated at Sadovoe by a converging attack from four separate units of 51st Army, while the 126th pushed ahead through Aksai to reinforce 81st Cavalry and strengthen the outer encirclement front. On the same day the encirclement 6th Army was completed when 4th Mechanized joined hands with Southwestern Front's 4th Tank Corps at Sovetsky.

Trufanov's forces continued pressing forward on November 24. The cavalry divisions advanced into the open spaces between Aksai and Sadovaia, which were 45 km apart. The 126th continued southward to Abganerovo, sending advance detachments to Tebektenerovo, Kapkinskii Station, Shelestov, and the Solianoi burial mound, 17 km southwest of Aksai, as the 302nd advanced on the left. By dusk the 4th Panzer Army's defenses were a shambles, with its few organized forces pulling back toward Kotelnikovo. However, early the next day the advance guard of an ad hoc unit called Battlegroup Pannwitz began arriving at that place. Totaling several thousand men, the battlegroup consisted of a volunteer Cossack cavalry brigade, rear service and replacement personnel of 4th Panzer, 18 tanks from repair workshops, and a motorized Romanian artillery battalion.

=== Battle for Kotelnikovo ===
4th Cavalry Corps had received orders to take Kotelnikovo by November 27, with the 126th advancing along the railway from Zhutovo between the two cavalry divisions. This would entail a march of 90–95 km by the three divisions in three days. Yeryomenko, unaware of the arrival of Group Pannwitz and the approach of 6th Panzer Division, believed that the seizing of Kotelnikovo would forestall any chance of the Axis forces creating a cohesive front. In fact, the town had already been chosen as the jumping-off point for the new Army Group Hoth's relief operation toward Stalingrad. During November 25 the 61st Cavalry encountered Group Pannwitz 45 km east of the town, as well as the 8th Romanian Cavalry Division. The 126th, still concentrating at Zhutovo, was well out of supporting range. After a fight that continued into the next morning the 61st was forced westward to Umantsevo with heavy losses and in considerable disorder. Despite this setback Trufanov reorganized his forces overnight to resume the advance on Kotelnikovo. 81st Cavalry pushed southwest another 35 km to the lower Aksai River, while Kuropatenko's regiments fanned out to the south, southwest, and west by the end of November 26. Further east the 302nd remained more concentrated, with one regiment at Abganerovo as a reserve.

The 81st Cavalry, accompanied by some 35 tanks of 85th Tank Brigade,:

... together with 4th Separate Antitank Battalion, penetrated into the western and northwestern outskirts of Kotel'nikovo and across the railroad in a surprise raid at first light on 27 November. The enemy was seized with panic but not for long. The slow tempo of the movement into the city gave the enemy an opportunity to assemble subunits and tanks of various types located in Kotel'nikovo and launch a counterattack during the second half of the day. This succeeded in enveloping the left flank of the cavalry units, striking them from the rear, and forcing them to retreat.

In fact, the 81st attempted to take the town just as the lead elements of 6th Panzer arrived from France and began unloading. Meanwhile, the 126th attempted to catch up with the cavalry, taking the towns of Krugliakov and Kovalevka on the Aksai from a Romanian regiment-sized force with 10 tanks, and also captured the railroad bridge northeast of the former place by 1000 hours. It then moved south toward Nebykov on the routes to Kotelnikovo. By the evening the 4th Cavalry Corps and its three supporting rifle divisions were spread over a front in excess of 100 km and highly vulnerable to a fresh panzer division.

Trufanov ordered his forces to continue their advance, but at a more cautious pace. During the first days of December Lt. Gen. E. Raus, commander of 6th Panzer, remained puzzled as to why the Soviet command was allowing him to concentrate at Kotelnikovo. In fact, 51st Army was weaker than he understood, and the Red Air Force was required elsewhere. At dusk on November 30 the Army was preparing defensive positions, with the 126th digging in on a 20 km front from Nebykovo to Hills 141 and 172, 25 km southwest of Aksai. During the first 10 days of December Raus built Kotelnikovo into a fortified "bridgehead" for the upcoming offensive while 51st Army carried out reconnaissance and put its forces in order. In addition, on December 3–4, as 4th Cavalry Corps fought for the village of Pokhlebin, 6th Panzer committed a group of 45-50 tanks in a counterblow that cost most of the Army, including the division, losses in personnel and weapons.

As a result of this setback Colonel Kuropatenko was relieved of his command "for poor battle organization and loss of control", and replaced by Col. Veniamin Semyonovich Romanov. Kuropatenko would later lead the 315th, 71st Guards, and 9th Guards Rifle Divisions and would be promoted to major general on September 1, 1943. The 126th advanced some 10 km on December 5, bring it up to supporting range of the 302nd, but farther east a 10 km-wide gap remained between it and the 91st Division on its left. The situation remained largely unchanged over the next six days.

=== Operation Winter Storm ===
The attempt to relieve 6th Army would be led by Field Marshal E. von Manstein, with a strike force mostly consisting of LVII Panzer Corps (initially 6th and 23rd Panzer Divisions), which would push off from Kotelnikovo on December 12. 6th Panzer was lightly screened by 18th Romanian Infantry and hit the 81st Cavalry and 85th Tanks in wedge formation. The defenders were driven off to the north in disorder, with 10 of 14 tanks knocked out. Meanwhile, 23rd Panzer attacked in the Nebykov area. The village was taken at 1335 hours and some 3,000 men of the 302nd were reported as fleeing to the northeast; the divisional headquarters was captured and some 250 officers and men were captured. The right wing of the 126th was also struck and forced back to the east into new defenses from Darganov to Sharnutovskii. The rest of the division faced Romanian 5th and 8th Cavalry and Group Pannwitz. Overall it had been a black day for 51st Army.

6th Panzer continued its advance overnight, taking a bridgehead over the Aksai and reaching the hamlet of Verkhne-Kumskii by noon. Meanwhile, several Soviet forces converged on LVII Panzer, including the 126th, plus the reinforcing 4th and 13th Mechanized Corps and 87th Rifle Division. This led to sustained fighting in this area during December 13–18. On the first day the 13th Mechanized, in cooperation with the remnants of the 126th and 302nd, engaged in a duel with 23rd Panzer. In the afternoon a force of some 30 German tanks with motorized infantry in support attacked the 62nd Mechanized Brigade and its supporting 126th near Ternovyi Sovkhoz. The brigade's 2nd Battalion repulsed the effort, reportedly knocking out eight tanks and killing 250 infantry. 23rd Panzer was unable to find any weak spot and failed to advance through the day.

==== Battle for Verkhne-Kumskii ====
During December 14 Soviet forces continued to converge on Verkhne-Kumskii, engaging 6th Panzer. Meanwhile, 23rd Panzer formed a pair of battlegroups to attack 13th Mechanized and its supporting units. The right wing group, based on the 201st Panzer Regiment and 1st Battalion, 128th Panzer-Grenadier Regiment, struck the defenses of 62nd Mechanized and part of the 126th, forcing them out of the village of Samokhin and back to new defenses 1.5–2 km to the north. The left wing group attacked the 302nd and the 17th Mechanized Brigade, forcing a crossing of the Aksai. By day's end the Soviet grouping was facing encirclement and Trufanov authorized a full withdrawal across the river, which took place overnight and into the next day. The climax of the battle for Verkhne-Kumskii took place on December 15 as 4th Mechanized retook the village and forced 6th Panzer back to the Aksai. 23rd Panzer pursued the 13th Mechanized, 126th and 302nd, forcing another bridgehead at Shestakov and bringing it to a line with 6th Panzer, which, in principle, would allow the two divisions to jointly attack north to the Myshkova, but the latter would first have to retake Verkhne-Kumskii.

General Raus intended to make a concentrated attack with over 100 tanks against 4th Mechanized on December 16, but General H. Hoth overruled this decision as too bold. 23rd Panzer had planned to cooperate with 6th Panzer, but its 201st Regiment was forced to defend its bridgehead at Krugliakov which was under attack from the 302nd, part of the 13th Mechanized, and the 20th Tank Destroyer Brigade. The bridgehead was held and another forced at Kovalevka, but the northward drive was stalled. The next day the combined Soviet force, now with part of the 126th, continued to hold the panzers on the entire sector from Krugliakov to Zhutov 2 to the southeast. By now the 17th Panzer Division was finally arriving from across the Don as Hoth gave orders for a renewed effort toward the Myshkova. This began at dawn on December 18 and made several gains but 6th Panzer was still shut out of Verkhne-Kumskii. By now the 2nd Guards Army was arriving along the Myshkova and had taken command of the 4th and 13th Mechanized. The battle had moved past the 126th, which was simply screened by the Romanian Group Popescu. As of December 22 the division was on a sector from 2 km west of Aksai to Kurgan Nugra. The next day 6th Panzer was ordered to begin moving west to the rescue of Italian 8th Army, and Winter Storm was effectively at an end.

== Advance on Rostov ==
As of January 1, 1943, the 51st Army, with four rifle divisions (126th, 302nd, 91st, 87th), had been transferred to Southern Front, in preparation for a new offensive toward Rostov-on-Don. On December 31 the LVII Panzer Corps began to withdraw from the positions it had taken during Winter Storm. The 126th was along the Sal River, 70–80 km northeast of Zimovniki, with its forward detachment 15 km ahead. It and the 91st were facing a defensive screen of the 23rd Panzer. Trufanov's report late on January 5 stated in part:

126th RD, after completing a march, concentrated at Ostrovianskii, Bol'shevik, and Chapaev, at 0900 hours. At 1700 hours a battalion of enemy infantry with 20 tanks attacked two of 550th RR's companies at Andrianov, which suffered losses and withdrew 3 kilometres south of Andrianov and Chapaev... The enemy withdrew 3 kilometres south of Andrianov and Chapaev...

This would prove the harbinger of a complex battle between 3rd Guards Mechanized Corps (former 4th Mechanized), the supporting 126th and 91st, plus lead elements of 28th Army, and the 23rd Panzer plus at least one battalion of Germania Regiment of 5th SS Panzergrenadier Division "Wiking". Due to maintenance difficulties and severe winter weather 3rd Guards Mechanized rarely had more than 10 operational tanks by this time. Despite this, Yeryomenko and Trufanov planned a deep envelopment of the German force, which its commander had anticipated, based on air reconnaissance. As the Soviet forces moved southeast of Orlovskaya 23rd Panzer went over to the attack. After striking the 550th Regiment with Battlegroup Bachmann the 23rd's Battlegroup von Heydebreck forced the 366th Regiment back about 1,000m to stronger positions. Beginning at about 0700 hours on January 6 the two German forces got into a three-hour battle with 3rd Guards Mechanized and 6th Guards Tank Brigade which led to the recapture of Stavropol, but a battalion of the 550th was able to drive von Heydebreck out of Andrianov. At day's end the 126th was reported as defending as follows:

366th RR - one rifle battalion on Hill 109.5 to the barn; 550th RR - from the barn to Chapaev; 690th RR (minus one battalion) - in Zakavkaskaia with one company in Kamyshev and two companies with 366th RR on Hill 109.5. Division headquarters - Cherkesskaya [12km southeast of Andrianov].

This indicates that the 550th had abandoned Andrianov for better positions. Late on January 7 Colonel Romanov died, possibly by poison, and was replaced by Col. Konstantin Vasilevich Sychyov, who had been serving as deputy commander since November.

Despite heavy snow that began at 1800 hours the rifle forces of 3rd Guards Mechanized, with the 126th and 91st, began an overnight attack. At 2300 the 366th Regiment struck 23rd Panzer's armored halftrack battalion in Nizhnyi-Zundov and took the village Four hours later the panzer division's headquarters was informed that a column of Soviet infantry, mounted on 70 light horse carts, and a few motor vehicles (in fact the 550th Regiment) had bypassed the strongpoints guarding Kurmoiarskii and advanced another 10 km to the west, taking Orlovskaya, which was on the Kuberle–Proletarskaya rail line. Although the 366th was forced out of Nizhnyi-Zundov by 0500, the 91st surrounded Veselyi and captured it, forcing 23rd Panzer to organize a counterattack on January 8.

23rd Panzer was now organized into two battle groups and a panzer detachment of 10-20 tanks. The Soviet mobile forces were still suffering severe fuel shortages, which greatly lessened their numerical advantage. The counterattack hit the 126th as it was trying to retake Nizhnyi-Zundov and Verkhne-Zundov at 1400 hours. The 550th was reported as having enveloped the latter place from the southwest by 0800 while also moving on Kurmoiarskii, while the 690th had reached Andianov from Kamyshev. By the end of the day the situation was set for 51st Army's left wing and 28th Army's right wing to make a concentrated attack toward Orlovskaya and Proletarskaya despite the fact that the 550th Regiment had been encircled and forced out of the former by Germania late in the day, losing more than 800 men killed or captured. In a report from Trufanov's headquarters late on January 10 the 366th Regiment was at Nizhnyi-Zundov while the 690th had taken Verkhne-Zundov, with one company at Andrianov facing Germania.

January 11 saw the division taking Kurmoiarskii and advancing toward Bystrianskii as German forces pulled back toward Orlovskaya. Two days later Trufanov's headquarters issued a report that made clear the debilitating effect of this back-and-forth fighting:

126th RD has 200 active bayonets [riflemen and sappers], 16 76mm guns, 10 45mm guns, 9 82mm mortars, 10 120mm mortars, and 2 DShKs. The division went on the defense with its main forces at Kurmoiarskii at 0600 hours, while leaving a forward detachment in positions 3-4 kilometres east of Luganskii, with its front facing toward the west.

By January 15 it had reached Gundarov and Shelgakov, now facing elements of two regiments of 5th SS. By now it was clear that if the remaining German forces in the Caucasus region, particularly 1st Panzer Army, were to escape through Rostov, 4th Panzer would have to hold the line of the Manych River and Bataysk for at least 10 more days. In addition, Operation Little Saturn had begun on January 13 and was soon threatening Rostov from the north.

The immediate objective for 51st Army was to finally take Proletarskaya and the nearby crossing sites over the Manych. By late on January 16 the 126th was reported as having begun its advance on the place at 1100 hours, reaching Novyi Stan, 5 km to its northeast, at 1500. The next day the Army continued to close up to the town, with the division taking strong artillery fire. For January 19 it was ordered, along with a brigade of 3rd Guards Mechanized, to encircle and take it from three directions, with the remainder of the Corps attacking from the south. The division ended the day 3 km of the town's northern outskirts, after briefly entering it and engaging in street fighting. The next day the combined Soviet force made a more determined effort, which was met by an equally determined 5th SS, but Trufanov had committed his reserve 91st Division across the river to the northwest of Proletarskaya. Its forward detachment was soon at Sladkyi, 10 km west of the river, threatening to cut the overextended German communications. 5th SS was authorized to abandon the town that evening.

=== Over the Manych ===
Late on January 21 the 126th was reported as fighting along a line from Boroksula to Volovoi Baz, 6–8 km west of the Manych, with Sychyov's headquarters at Proletarskaya. 5th SS had retreated out of contact in order to take up a new defense line between Voensovet and Tselina. By late on January 23 the division's status was reported as follows:

126th RD - reached [the following] positions by 1300 hours: Marker 107.2, the eastern outskirts of Khleborodnaia, the road leading from north to south, and Plodorodnoe. 550th RR occupied Marker 107.2. 366th RR, while on the approaches to Khleborodnaia, met with enemy fire from Khleborodnaia, and was counterattacked from the northwest by up to two companies of enemy infantry and 3 tanks at 1500 hours. The regiment conducted a fighting withdrawal to 4 kilometres east of Khleborodnaia. 690th RR, while approaching the road east of Plodorodnaia, was counterattacked from the direction of Mikhailovskaia by one and one-half company of motorized infantry with 2 tanks. The regiment withdrew fighting to Blagodatnaia.

Despite these setbacks, and the consequent casualties, Trufanov ordered the division to take Frunze and Tsvetnoi by the end of January 24.

During that day the division took Khleborodnaia and Plodorodnaia, captured Kars at 1100 hours, and three more villages by dusk, for a total advance 20 km, hampered more by thawing temperatures than German opposition. Trufanov moved it into second echelon, behind the 91st, for January 25. The supply situation was such that the division was reported as having no motor fuel or lubricants available at all. The next day the 126th took Malo-Kuznetsov No. 1, Kagalnichek, and Pishvanov by 0900 hours, but this triggered a reaction from 23rd Panzer's Battlegroup Löw, which counterattacked at the latter place with 10 tanks and motorized infantry. This forced the 690th Regiment to retreat, although roughly half the panzers were knocked out. Two rifle brigades of 28th Army arrived in the afternoon and brought the remaining panzers to a halt. Sychyov was now ordered to concentrate his remaining troops in the area of the 1st Cavalry Army Konnyi Zavod (stud farm) to serve as the Army's reserve during a brief rest and refit. It was clear by this time that Southern Front would not succeed in cutting off 1st Panzer Army before it escaped through Rostov.

This reprieve was short lived, as on January 28 the 126th and 302nd attacked 17th Panzer at Bolshaya and Malaya Talovaya without success. The battle continued the next day with the division on the southern approaches to the former place when at 0900 hours it was counterattacked with 11 tanks and motorized infantry, forcing a withdrawal of some 150m. At 1500 the 690th Regiment was struck at the motor tractor station and pushed back to the southwestern slope of Hill 109.9. The 126th and 17th Panzer faced off again on January 30; at noon three tanks advanced on Hill 109.9 but came under fire from the 358th Artillery Regiment and retreated to the village. By 2000 the division had occupied Bolshaya Talovaya as 17th Panzer withdrew. Late the next day 51st Army stated that the division had forced a small German group from Srednyi Khoruli before concentrating there and carrying out reconnaissance toward Rakovo-Tavricheskii. On February 1 it captured that place, as the Front noted that "the division has suffered great losses and is putting itself in order."

Overnight on February 2/3 both 17th and 23rd Panzer Divisions departed the front. In its weakened state Trufanov's forces could not mount a pursuit; the 126th had no more than 500 "bayonets" at this point and was again under orders to rest and refit. He intended the division to again support 3rd Guards Mechanized in upcoming operations. By February 5 it was concentrated at Zhukovo-Tatarskii.

=== Liberation of Rostov ===
On February 6 the STAVKA ordered 51st Army to wheel northwestward toward Olginskaya and Aksaiskaya. During the day the 550th Regiment took Kamyshevakha while by day's end one regiment was at Pervomaiskii and the other two were in Krasnoarmiesskii. Olginskaya was defended by a regiment of the 111th Infantry Division supported by 10-12 tanks. For February 8 the 126th was to attack toward Olginskaya-Rakovka, 9 km north of Aksaiskaya. This accomplished nothing, and the division was ordered to advance on Aksaiskaya the next day with several other units against 16th Motorized Division. It got into the town with the 87th Division and took the railway station before increasing artillery fire and counterattacks pushed it largely south of the Don east of the bridge. In the Army's summary for February 12 the division was reported as having two regiments on the island south of the town and one right of the bridge. Sychyov was directed to relieve the 87th and defend the combined line. 51st Army was now expected to reorient to the north and strengthen the Front's right wing. During February 13 the 126th and the 76th Fortified Region defended against artillery, mortar, and machine gun fire, which they returned. 16th Motorized evacuated Aksaiskaya late in the day.

At 1500 hours on February 14 German forces abandoned Rostov and Aksaiskaya. Coincidentally, on the same day General Trufanov was replaced in command of 51st Army by Lt. Gen. G. F. Zakharov. The 126th had mopped up Aksaiskaya by 0300 before advancing on Bolshie Saly, which it was directed to capture by midnight. As the German withdrawal continued the division took that place and continued the next day to Vtoraya Balka. For January 16 Sychyov was ordered to reach the Buzinov region. At this time it and the 87th were the only combat-effective divisions in the Army.

=== To the Mius ===
23rd Panzer was pulling back to the prepared Green Line from Krym north to the Tuzlov River and the two Soviet divisions were hard pressed to keep pace. The German division was already sending units back to the Mius-Front to reinforce the forces already there, as a breakthrough by 4th Guards Mechanized Corps was threatening this line and putting Manstein's strategy in jeopardy. On February 16 captured Kuzminskii at 1300 hours and was fighting for Massalonovka by 1500. Early on February 17 the 4th Guards Mechanized took Matveyev Kurgan, but it was unsupported. Zakharov was ordered to push the 126th and 87th forward as quickly as possible and they moved into positions just vacated by 23rd Panzer, but this still placed them 30–35 km southwest of the Kurgan.

The Front's report for February 17 stated that:

... after overcoming enemy resistance and capturing Novoselovka and Krasnosel'e, was fighting for Blagodat' at 0300 hours. The division reached the Murkovka Balka region [5-10km east of the Mius River] at 1600 hours, where any further advance was halted by heavy enemy mortar and machine gun fire from Riasnoi.

The division was ordered to take Riazhenaya and Petro-Georgievsk overnight. The report for February 18 gave the dispositions of the division as: the 366th Regiment 1.5 km north of Marker 67.9; 550th Regiment at "KAM"; and 690th Regiment also at Marker 67.9. At 0900 the division had taken three burial mounds southeast of Denisovskii and was in combat with German troops occupying Panchenka, 9 km south of Matveyev Kurgan. By the end of the next day the 126th and 87th were moving forward to the aid of 3rd Guards Mechanized in the Riazhenaya region and also take over their own sector south of the Kurgan, where the 79th Infantry Division was holding out. However, overnight and into the afternoon both divisions came under artillery and mortar fire and air attacks before being counterattacked at 1620 hours by "6 tanks and several vehicles with infantry" in the southeast outskirts of Denisovskii. This was driven off by the combined artillery of the two divisions, with one tank and several vehicles destroyed. During the day the 126th claimed one Ju 88 shot down, while losing 17 men killed and 31 wounded.

By now the 33rd Guards Rifle Division was in possession of Matveyev Kurgan, but no forces of 51st or 2nd Guards Army were in a position to come to its assistance. During February 20, as 2nd Guards attempted to remedy the situation, the 126th fully occupied Riazhenaya and engaged nearby German forces with artillery fire. By the next day it became clear that the Soviet offensive was at an end. The 126th and 87th were stalled short of Hill 105.7 and Stepanovskii. The Army reported that the 126th held a shallow bridgehead on the west bank of the Mius, but all further progress was "halted by strong enemy artillery and machine gun fire." On February 22 even this meagre holding was lost in hand-to-hand fighting. The lines would crystallize here for several months. On March 4 Colonel Sychyov was concussed and wounded in the leg; after recovery he would take command of the 130th Rifle Division for most of the remainder of the war. He was replaced by Col. Aleksandr Ignatevich Kazartsev, who had commanded the 87th from its formation until he was hospitalized due to illness in January. He would be promoted to the rank of major general on September 15, 1943, and would be made a Hero of the Soviet Union on November 1. Later in March the divisional returns showed some 3,500 personnel on strength. As the division rebuilt it was noted in May that its personnel were 75 percent Uzbek, Tatar, and Kazakh.

== Into Ukraine ==
During April the 126th was reassigned to 5th Shock Army, still in Southern Front. As the German summer offensive at Kursk passed its climax the STAVKA saw an opportunity to crack the Mius-Front, but after a great deal of costly back-and-forth fighting finally suspended the effort on July 27, although German counterattacks would continue until August 2.

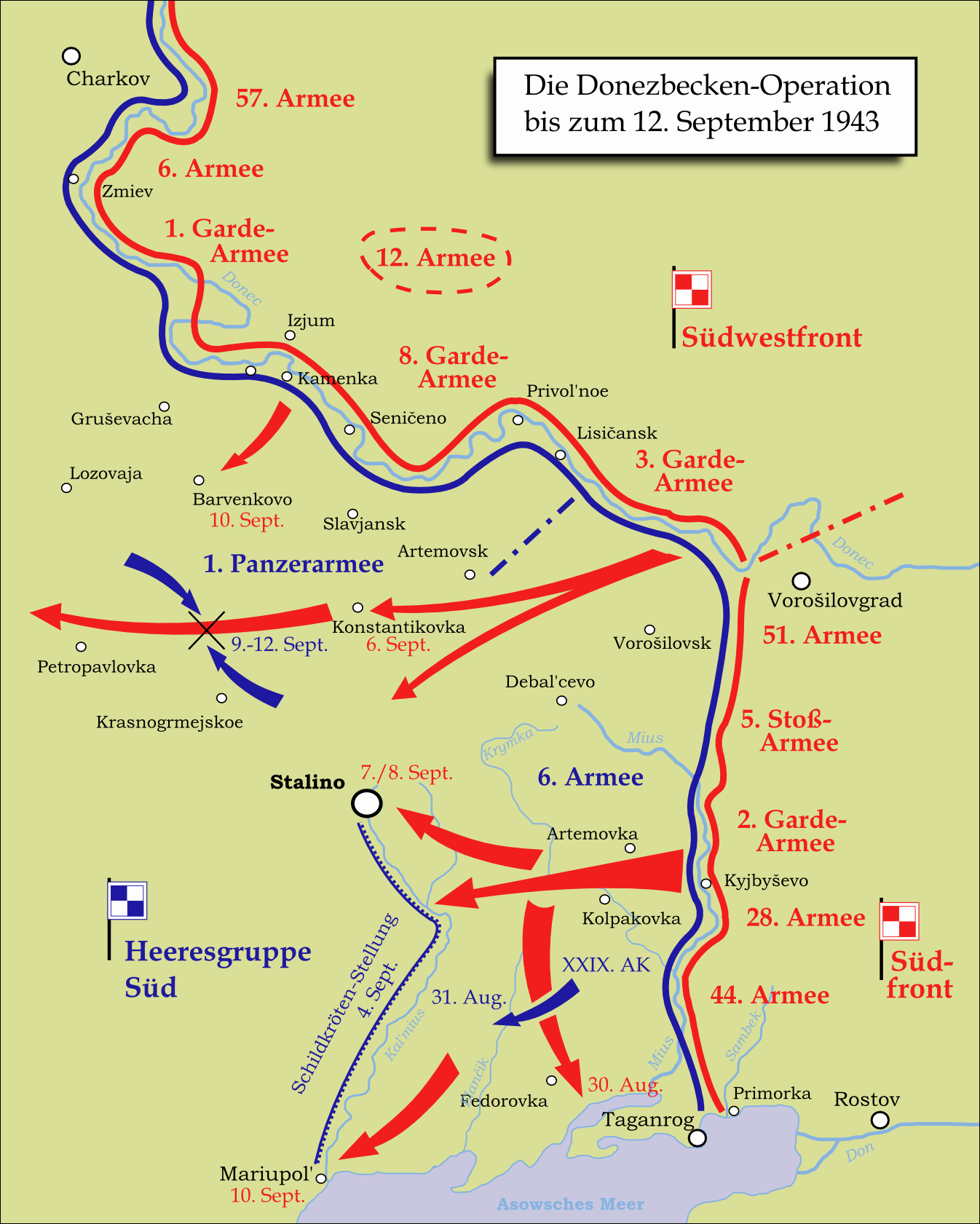
Donbas Operation, August 13 - September 12, 1943

A renewed offensive began on August 13 and although Southwestern Front to the north was initially unable to penetrate the front of 1st Panzer Army south of Izium, Southern Front broke through 6th Army beginning on August 18. 5th Shock Army, with an overwhelming concentration, especially of artillery, on a narrow front, penetrated 7 km behind the front through a 3 km-wide gap. Under the light of a full moon the Army spread out north and south behind the 6th Army's front. German efforts to close the gap on August 20 made some initial progress but failed due to a strong Soviet reaction. By August 23 1st Panzer Army was also in trouble with its army corps south of Izium reduced to a combat strength of just 5,800 men and unable to hold a continuous line. On August 31 Manstein was finally authorized to withdraw both Armies to the Kalmius River, effectively beginning the race to the Dniepr. By this time the 126th had joined the 87th in 55th Rifle Corps, still in 5th Shock. As this drive continued on September 4 the city of Horlivka was captured, and the division received a battle honor:

GORLOVKA... 126th Rifle Division (Col. Kazartsev, Aleksandr Ignatevich)... The troops who participated in the liberation of the Donbas, during which they captured Gorlovka and other cities, by the order of the Supreme High Command of 8 September 1943, and a commendation in Moscow, are given a salute of 20 artillery salvoes from 224 guns.

=== Lower Dniepr Offensive ===
Later that month the division returned to 51st Army, now as part of 10th Rifle Corps. During the rest of September Southern Front, with 51st near its left (southern), forced the 6th Army back through the Donbas towards the southernmost part of the Panther–Wotan line from Zaporozhe to Melitopol. On October 9 the Front (renamed 4th Ukrainian on October 20) renewed its offensive on both sides of the latter city. The Army forced its way into the southern part of Melitopol on October 12, but it was not until October 23 that the city was finally cleared. On the same date the 126th was awarded its first Order of the Red Banner. By this time the division was under 54th Rifle Corps, and it would remain under this command well into the postwar. Two days later the 51st and 28th Armies pushed south and southwest of the city, splitting 6th Army into two parts. Two German and two Romanian divisions were south of the breakthrough, a force too weak to defend the Isthmus of Perekop effectively, especially as the Romanians were beginning to panic. On October 27 the 13th Panzer Division drove into the gap from the north but did not have the strength to close it. The 51st and 28th now advanced rapidly toward Perekop and Kherson. While 6th Army's southern group abandoned its heavy equipment as it fell back over the Dniepr, the northern group formed a bridgehead south of Nikopol, from where Hitler intended to reopen communications with the Crimea.

== Into the Crimea ==
On October 28 Hitler forbade any Axis evacuation of the Crimea. Elements of the 336th Infantry Division happened to close to the north shore of the peninsula and Gen. E. Jaenecke, commander of 17th Army, agreed to establish a few blocking positions, although he was convinced that the Crimea was untenable. The old Tatar Wall near Perekop was again fortified. 51st Army, now under command of Lt. Gen. Ya. G. Kreizer, was tasked with breaking through at Perekop, and it appeared to 4th Ukrainian Front that the peninsula could be taken off the march, given its predominance in tanks, artillery, and infantry. The vanguard of 19th Tank Corps arrived within sight of Perekop on the morning of November 1 and soon forced a breakthrough of the Tatar Wall, not stopping until reaching the outskirts of Armiansk. Meanwhile, 10th Rifle Corps found a crossing site over the Syvash. Despite these early successes the lodgements were contained, and the Front was left pounding against the Axis defenses throughout the winter. In February 1944 the 126th, with 54th Corps, was transferred to 2nd Guards Army.

=== Battle for Sevastopol ===
As spring broke the Front commander, Army Gen. F. I. Tolbukhin, and Yeryomenko, now leading the Coastal Army near Kerch, met with Stalin to plan a new offensive into Crimea. General Zakharov, now in command of 2nd Guards, would mount a deliberate drive against the Perekop, while 51st Army broke out from the Syvash bridgehead. Zakharov had spent months in training on breaching operations, and in digging approach trenches, bringing no-man's land down to just 150-200m in places. The German defense consisted of three lines owing to the narrowness of the front.

Tolbukhin began on April 7 with a massive attack by 8th Air Army against Luftwaffe bases and German ground targets. The artillery preparation began the next morning at 0800 hours and lasted 2.5 hours, interspersed with additional air attacks. The ground attacks began at 1030. Zakharov introduced novel tactics, leading with the 13th Guards Rifle Corps rather than a mass attack by the entire Army. 13th Guards was supported on its flanks by the 126th and the 87th Guards Rifle Division. Smoke shells were used for cover, with flamethrowing tanks and self-propelled guns in support. Despite losses the Guards Corps had torn a large gap in the line that was beyond repair, and Zakharov sent more troops into the breach. While no true breakthrough was made, there were very few German reserves available.

On April 9 Armiansk was taken, and while the 50th Infantry Division still maintained an notional front line across the peninsula it was crumbling on the western end. Zakharov maintained the pressure with artillery and infantry until it finally broke at about 1600 hours. The 63rd Rifle Corps overran the Romanian 19th Infantry Division as well and in the late afternoon a task force of Soviet armor began heading south. Jaenecke activated Plan Adler for the evacuation of Crimea at 1900 without reference to the OKH and ordered his V Army Corps to pull back from Kerch toward Sevastopol. Zakharov increased the pressure by ordering the 387th Rifle Division of 54th Corps to make an amphibious landing behind German lines. Before dawn on April 10, 512 troops of the 2nd Battalion of the 1271st Rifle Regiment were landed on the coast. Even without heavy weapons the battalion held off counterattacks by a company of infantry and several assault guns. This landing was the final straw to convince the Germans to abandon their remaining positions on the Perekop and start a retreat to their second line at Ishun, which was already untenable and soon fell, giving the Soviet forces complete access to the Crimea. For its role in forcing the defenses of the Perekop, on April 24 the 126th would be awarded the Order of Suvorov, 2nd Degree.

Hitler refused to authorize the full evacuation, but gave Jaenecke permission to remove wounded and non-essential rear-area personnel. Based on the Soviet defense in 1941-42 he believed Sevastopol could be held for many months, despite the disrepair of the fortifications. On April 13 Simferopol and Yevpatoria were taken, and V Corps was forced to evacuate to Balaklava by sea or trek through the Yaila Mountains, arriving in eastern Sevastopol on April 16. 2nd Guards Army attacked on April 23 and captured ground on Mekenzievy Mountain. Tolbukhin kept up the pressure with and attack on May 1 by the Army against the German defenses on the south side of the Belbek River. At this point 17th Army had only 64,000 personnel remaining, while 4th Ukrainian numbered some 400,000. The final offensive began at 0930 hours on May 5 with a 2-hour artillery preparation. The 336th Infantry was able to hold against attacks by five rifle divisions for the next two days. On the morning of May 7 2nd Guards advanced to the shore of Severnaya Bay. After the failure of German counterattacks across the front, at 2300 on May 8 Hitler grudgingly agreed to evacuate. Coastal Army was ordered to liquidate the last German forces in the Chersonese, a battle that continued until May 13. On May 24 the 126th would be awarded a rare second Order of the Red Banner for its part in taking Sevastopol.

The Crimea was an obvious strategic dead end, and plans were quickly put in motion for redeployment of most of 4th Ukrainian Front. On May 19 the 126th was moved to the Reserve of the Supreme High Command and began moving north. On June 10 General Kazartsev left the division, soon taking command of the 72nd Rifle Corps; postwar he would join the Air Defense Forces and reach the rank of colonel general in 1958 before his retirement in 1961. Col. Aleksandr Ignatevich Kazakov, his deputy commander, now took command of the 126th. On July 8 the division, along with most of 2nd Guards Army, was assigned to 1st Baltic Front, which was advancing toward Lithuania. 54th Corps now comprised the 126th, 263rd, and 346th Rifle Divisions.

== Baltic Offensives ==
Operation Bagration, the Soviet summer offensive in Belarus, had begun on June 22, and by early July 1 Baltic was advancing into the "Baltic Gap" that had developed between Army Group Center and Army Group North. 2nd Guards was concentrating in the vicinity of Varapayeva. By July 22 a favorable situation had come about for 1st Baltic and 3rd Belorussian Fronts to develop the offensive toward Daugavpils, Panevėžys, and Šiauliai. The German grouping in and around Daugavpils was facing encirclement, and chose to attack the forces of 1st Baltic between there and Šiauliai in an effort to escape. Despite this, 51st Army was successful in taking Panevėžys the same day. Under the circumstances, with 43rd Army resisting successfully, on July 24 the commander of 1st Baltic Front, Army Gen. I. K. Bagramyan, chose to continue advancing with his remaining forces in an effort to cut off not just the Daugavpils grouping, but all of Army Group North, from its communications with East Prussia.

The Front's situation improved further on July 25 as 2nd Guards and 51st Armies advanced along the Panevėžys–Šiauliai axis without serious opposition and were threatening to reach the Gulf of Riga. On July 27 the German Daugavpils grouping began a hurried retreat to the northwest, and the city fell to 4th Shock Army. The next day the 43rd and 51st Armies opened the Šiauliai–Riga operational axis, but their forces were scattered along a 206 km-wide frontage. On the morning of July 31 the 3rd Guards Mechanized Corps took the town of Tukums and cut the remaining road from Germany to Army Group North. At this time the 126th was in the vicinity of Radviliškis. German efforts to reopen these communications began immediately, leading to a major operation codenamed Operation Doppelkopf in mid-August, when the division was stationed at Kuršėnai. The commander of 43rd Army, Lt. Gen. A. P. Beloborodov, wrote in his memoirs:

Ultimately, the enemy succeeded in pushing back the 51st Army somewhat and penetrating a 50-kilometer corridor from Riga to the southwest, along the Baltic coast. Seeking to expand this corridor, the Nazis continued their advance. Throughout the second half of August and the first half of September, they conducted massive tank attacks, particularly persistent on the left flank of the 1st Baltic Front. The enemy suffered enormous losses but was unable to achieve any significant results.

The 126th also suffered heavy losses in this attack. In its aftermath it was back near Radviliškis by mid-September, and remained there into the first week of October. Colonel Kazakov was removed from command on October 14 after being found responsible for the high casualties during Doppelkopf; he was replaced by Col. Ivan Ivanovich Vasilenko. On October 31, for their roles in the defensive and offensive fighting around Šiauliai the 366th Rifle Regiment was awarded the Order of Suvorov, 3rd Degree, while the 690th Regiment received the Order of Kutuzov, 3rd Degree. During November the 54th Corps (126th, 263rd Divisions) was transferred to 43rd Army, which was now largely concerned with the siege of Memel.

== Into East Prussia ==
The Vistula-Oder offensive, as well as the offensive into East Prussia, began on January 13. On the night of January 18/19 54th Corps was transferred to 39th Army, which was under 3rd Belorussian Front. Tilsit finally fell during the latter half of January 19 after a short battle. Immediately following this the 43rd Army as a whole was transferred to 3rd Belorussian, and 54th Corps rejoined it. Colonel Vasilenko left the division on January 20 and was replaced by Col. Fyodor Andreevich Safronov, who had previously commanded the 257th Rifle Division. This officer would lead the division until he died of illness on October 10, 1945.

The Front now began a pursuit of the defeated German IX Army Corps with its right wing Armies; the German remnants were attempting to retreat behind the Alle and Deime Rivers. By the end of January 22 the 43rd Army had made a fighting advance of 23 km and the 54th Corps' main force had reached Kelladen while other elements of the Army were on the east shore of the Kurisches Haff. The German forces were hurriedly fortifying the approaches to Labiau and were trying to organize a defense along the east bank of the Deime, which was the last line of defense before Königsberg.

Combat operations continued overnight on January 22/23. At dawn the 43rd Army attacked Labiau following a short artillery preparation. The defenders, employing heavy machine gun and mortar fire, initially stopped the 103rd Rifle Corps' units at the river, but eventually its 115th Rifle Division and 54th Corps' 263rd forced a crossing and outflanked the town from north and south, while the 319th Rifle Division broke in from the east. Labiau, with most of its garrison, was in Soviet hands by the end of the day and the Army was directed to continue its advance to the west. By the end of January 26 it had reached a line from Postnikken to Zelweten. From here it developed its attack along the seacoast, pursuing the remnants of two German infantry divisions and reaching the line Stombeck–Norgenen while 54th Corps repelled four counterattacks by tanks and infantry. With Königsberg cut off the Front now focused on eliminating the German forces southwest of the city in the Preußisch Eylau–Landsberg–Bartenstein area, but this did not directly involve the 43rd Army. During February the 54th Corps was transferred to 39th Army, which became part of the Zemland Group of Forces effective February 24.

=== Battles for Königsberg and Samland ===
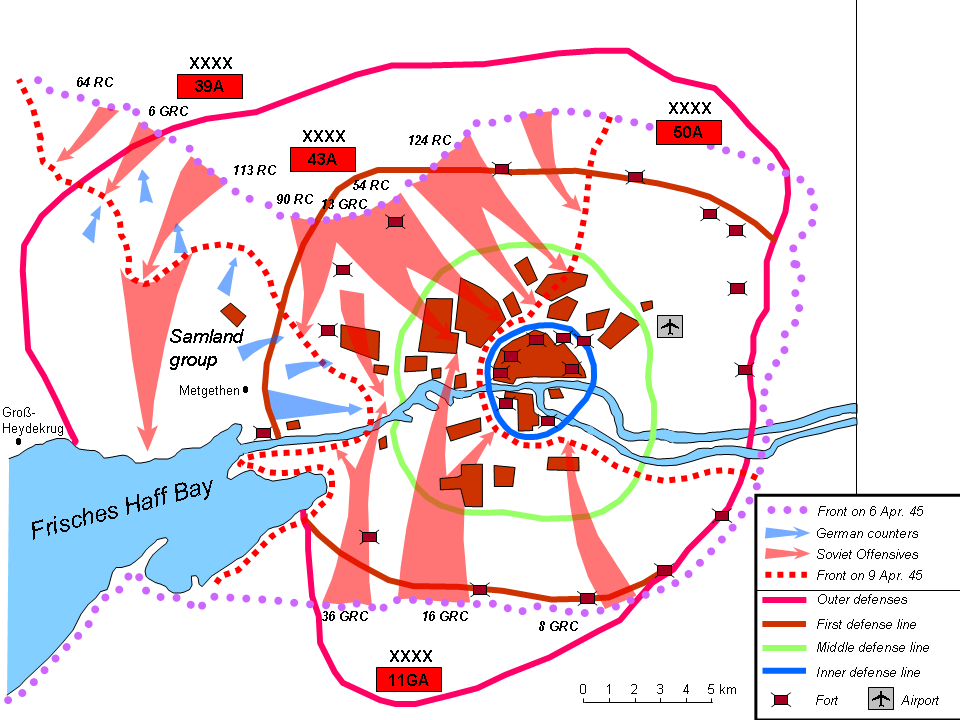
Battle Of Königsberg. Note positions of 43rd Army.

By the beginning of April the 54th Corps had returned to 43rd Army, which was also part of the Zemland Group. This Group was disbanded on April 3 and the Army reverted to direct command of 3rd Belorussian Front. The Army was deployed northwest of Königsberg on an attack frontage about 3 km wide from Katzenblick to Amalienhof with 54th Corps on the left flank. It faced elements of the 561st Infantry Division.

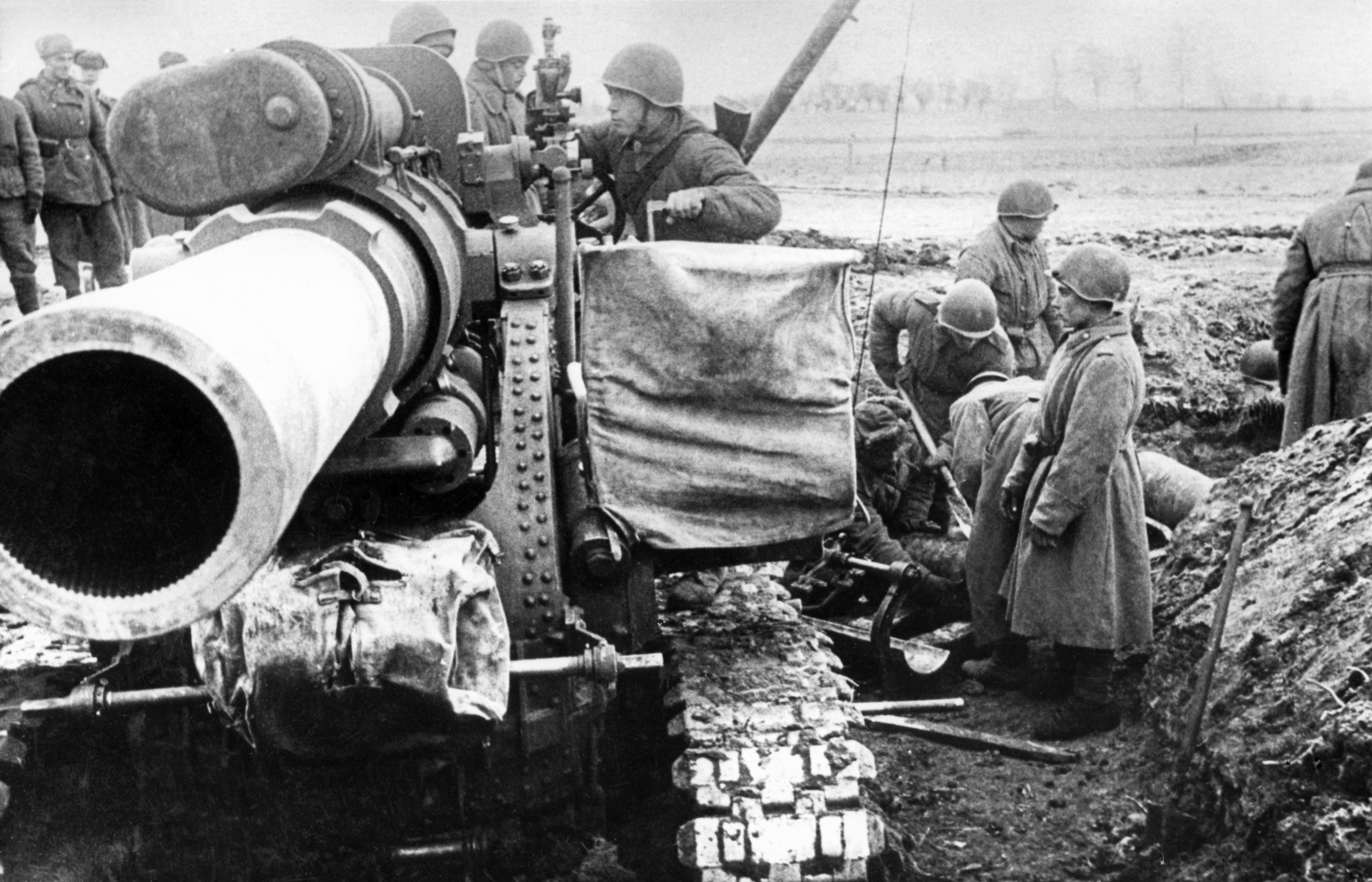
280mm mortar and crew in East Prussia, 1945

In preparation, Colonel Safronov organized several special assault groups. As one example, that of the 2nd Battalion of the 550th Regiment consisted of two rifle companies; one combined heavy machine gun/mortar company; an antitank battery with six 45mm pieces; the divisional 265th Antitank Battalion with an additional 18 pieces; two sections of the 175th Sapper Battalion; the separate 266th Flamethrower Company; two 280mm mortars and two ISU-122 assault guns. Following four days of fire reconnaissance and destruction of fixed defenses by artillery and aviation, the assault began with an artillery preparation at 1030 hours on April 6; the infantry and armor began moving forward at noon. During the day the Army advanced 3 km and cleared 20 city blocks. As the weather cleared the next day the Red Air Forces intensified its bombardment and the infantry was reinforced with artillery firing over open sights. 43rd Army captured one permanent fort and seized another 20 blocks. The advance continued on April 8 and in the afternoon 43rd Army linked up with 11th Guards Army in the Amalienau area while 54th Corps assisted units of 50th Army in capturing the Palfe area. Near the end of the next day the German garrison capitulated.

Following this victory the 43rd Army was given a role in clearing the German forces from the Sambia Peninsula. It was assigned an attack frontage of 7–8 km and was to advance in the direction of Nepleken. The operation began at 0800 hours on April 13 following a one-hour artillery preparation and on the first day the Army gained 5 km and took 1,500 prisoners. The next day it advanced along the north shore of the Frisches Haff, and took the strongpoint of Großheidekrug. On April 17 it captured the town of Fischhausen in cooperation with 39th Army and the peninsula was effectively cleared. Shortly after the 43rd was transferred to 2nd Belorussian Front and ended the war under that command.

== Postwar ==
At the time of the German surrender the men and women of the division shared the full title of 126th Rifle, Gorlovka, twice Order of the Red Banner, Order of Suvorov Division. (Russian: 126-я стрелковая Горловская дважды Краснознамённая ордена Суворова дивизия.) On May 17, in recognition for their roles in the taking of Königsberg, the 550th Rifle and 358th Artillery Regiments both received the Order of Kutuzov, 3rd Degree, while the 233rd Signal Battalion was awarded the Order of the Red Star. According to STAVKA Order No. 11097 of May 29, part 2, it was assigned with its Corps and Army to the Northern Group of Forces.

On December 25 it began loading onto trains with the rest of 54th Corps for transfer back to the Crimea, where it came under the Taurida Military District and was based at Simferopol. During 1946 it was redesignated and reequipped as the 28th Mechanized Division, which in turn was redesignated as the 101st Motorized Rifle Division in 1957. On November 17, 1964, it became the 126th Motor Rifle Division (military unit 19756).

In March 1967, due to the departure of the headquarters of the 45th Army Corps, the division was transferred to the 32nd Army Corps of the Odessa Military District. It comprised the 257th Tank Regiment (Perevalne) (which became 126th Tank Battalion around 1990), the 361st Motor Rifle Regiment (Yevpatoria), the 98th and 100th Motor Rifle Regiments (both Simferopol), the 816th Artillery Regiment, and the 1096th Anti-Aircraft Rocket Regiment (Mezhgorye, Crimea).

"The division was maintained as a Not Ready Division – Low-Strength Cadre." (Holm)

On December 1, 1989, the division was transferred to the Red Banner Black Sea Fleet and reformed into the 283rd Gorlovka Twice Red Banner Order of Suvorov Coastal Defense Division. The transfer was accompanied by an increase in the division's arsenal. On January 3, 1990, the division's number 126 was restored. The division finally disbanded at the insistence of the government of Ukraine in 1996.

In 2014 the Russian Government reformed the 126th Coastal Defence Brigade, which inherited the lineage of the division. After the beginning of the 2022 Russian invasion of Ukraine, the unit became the 126th Guards Coastal Defence Brigade. It was raised to Russian Guards status without a change in unit number.
