= Chervlyonoye =

Chervlyonoye Червлёное
- Selo
- Location within Volgograd Oblast Location within Russia
- Coordinates: 48°26′N 44°22′E
- Country: Russia
- Region: Volgograd Oblast
- District: Svetloyarsky District
- Time zone: UTC+4:00

Chervlyonoye (Russian: Червлёное) is a rural locality (a selo) in Svetloyarsky District, Volgograd Oblast, Russia. The population was 2,314 as of 2010. There are 23 streets.

== Geography ==
Chervlyonoye is located 37 km west of Svetly Yar (the district's administrative centre) by road. Kanalnaya is the nearest rural locality.
