= Lugovoy, Volgograd Oblast =

Lugovoy Луговой
- Settlement
- Location within Volgograd Oblast Location within Russia
- Coordinates: 48°13′N 44°29′E
- Country: Russia
- Region: Volgograd Oblast
- District: Svetloyarsky District
- Time zone: UTC+4:00

Lugovoy (Russian: Луговой) is a rural locality (a settlement) in Svetloyarsky District, Volgograd Oblast, Russia. The population was 467 as of 2010. There are 8 streets.

== Geography ==
Lugovoy is located 49 km southwest of Svetly Yar (the district's administrative centre) by road. Privolzhsky is the nearest rural locality.
