= Novosad (disambiguation) =

Novosad is a village and municipality in Košice Region, Slovakia.

Novosad may also refer to:

- Novosad, Volgograd Oblast, Russia
- Novosad Island, Antarctica
- Novosad (surname)
