= Barbashi =

Barbashi Барбаши
- Khutor
- Location within Volgograd Oblast Location within Russia
- Coordinates: 48°30′N 44°44′E
- Country: Russia
- Region: Volgograd Oblast
- District: Svetloyarsky District
- Time zone: UTC+4:00

Barbashi (Russian: Барбаши) is a rural locality (a khutor) in Svetloyarsky District, Volgograd Oblast, Russia. The population was 33 as of 2010.

== Geography ==
Barbashi is located 94 km northwest of Svetly Yar (the district's administrative centre) by road. Svetly Yar is the nearest rural locality.
