= Prudovy =

Prudovy Прудовый
- Settlement
- Location within Volgograd Oblast Location within Russia
- Coordinates: 48°19′N 44°16′E
- Country: Russia
- Region: Volgograd Oblast
- District: Svetloyarsky District
- Time zone: UTC+4:00

Prudovy (Russian: Прудовый) is a rural locality (a settlement) in Svetloyarsky District, Volgograd Oblast, Russia. The population was 329 as of 2010. There are 9 streets.

== Geography ==
Prudovy is located 53 km southwest of Svetly Yar (the district's administrative centre) by road. Kanalnaya is the nearest rural locality.
