= Krasnoflotsky =

Krasnoflotsky Краснофлотский
- Settlement
- Location within Volgograd Oblast Location within Russia
- Coordinates: 48°28′N 44°43′E
- Country: Russia
- Region: Volgograd Oblast
- District: Svetloyarsky District
- Time zone: UTC+4:00

Krasnoflotsky (Russian: Краснофлотский) is a rural locality (a settlement) in Svetloyarsky District, Volgograd Oblast, Russia. The population was 225 as of 2010. There are 3 streets.

== Geography ==
Krasnoflotsky is located 36 km south of Svetly Yar (the district's administrative centre) by road. Trudolyubiye is the nearest rural locality.
