= Trudolyubiye =

Trudolyubiye Трудолюбие
- Selo
- Location within Volgograd Oblast Location within Russia
- Coordinates: 48°14′N 44°50′E
- Country: Russia
- Region: Volgograd Oblast
- District: Svetloyarsky District
- Time zone: UTC+4:00

Trudolyubiye (Russian: Трудолюбие) is a rural locality (a selo) in Svetloyarsky District, Volgograd Oblast, Russia. The population was 85 as of 2010. There are 7 streets.

== Geography ==
Trudolyubiye is located 33 km south of Svetly Yar (the district's administrative centre) by road. Khonch Nur is the nearest rural locality.
