= Dubovy Ovrag =

Dubovy Ovrag Дубовый Овраг
- Selo
- Location within Volgograd Oblast Location within Russia
- Coordinates: 48°20′N 44°37′E
- Country: Russia
- Region: Volgograd Oblast
- District: Svetloyarsky District
- Time zone: UTC+4:00

Dubovy Ovrag (Russian: Дубовый Овраг) is a rural locality (a selo) in Svetloyarsky District, Volgograd Oblast, Russia. The population was 2,091 as of 2010. There are 12 streets.

== Geography ==
Dubovy Ovrag is located 29 km southwest of Svetly Yar (the district's administrative centre) by road. Bolshiye Chapurniki is the nearest rural locality.
