= Malye Chapurniki =

Malye Chapurniki Малые Чапурники
- Selo
- Location within Volgograd Oblast Location within Russia
- Coordinates: 48°26′N 44°34′E
- Country: Russia
- Region: Volgograd Oblast
- District: Svetloyarsky District
- Time zone: UTC+4:00

Malye Chapurniki (Russian: Малые Чапурники) is a rural locality (a selo) in Svetloyarsky District, Volgograd Oblast, Russia. The population was 805 as of 2010. There are 4 streets.

== Geography ==
Malye Chapurniki is located 19 km west of Svetly Yar (the district's administrative centre) by road. Bolshiye Chapurniki is the nearest rural locality.
