= Krasnopartizansky, Volgograd Oblast =

Krasnopartizansky Краснопартизанский
- Settlement
- Location within Volgograd Oblast Location within Russia
- Coordinates: 48°09′N 44°15′E
- Country: Russia
- Region: Volgograd Oblast
- District: Svetloyarsky District
- Time zone: UTC+4:00

Krasnopartizansky (Russian: Краснопартизанский) is a rural locality (a settlement) in Svetloyarsky District, Volgograd Oblast, Russia. The population was 97 as of 2010. There are 7 streets.

== Geography ==
Krasnopartizansky is located 70 km southwest of Svetly Yar (the district's administrative centre) by road. Abganerovo is the nearest rural locality.
