= Krasnopartizansky (rural locality) =

Krasnopartizansky (Russian: Краснопартиза́нский; masculine), Krasnopartizanskaya (Краснопартиза́нская; feminine), or Krasnopartizanskoye (Краснопартиза́нское; neuter) is the name of several rural localities in Russia:

- Krasnopartizansky, Chechen Republic, a settlement in Alkhan-Yurtovskaya Rural Administration of Urus-Martanovsky District of the Chechen Republic
- Krasnopartizansky, Rostov Oblast, a settlement in Krasnopartizanskoye Rural Settlement of Remontnensky District of Rostov Oblast
- Krasnopartizansky, Ryazan Oblast, a settlement in Vysokopolyansky Rural Okrug of Pitelinsky District of Ryazan Oblast
- Krasnopartizansky, Volgograd Oblast, a settlement in Privolzhsky Selsoviet of Svetloyarsky District of Volgograd Oblast
- Krasnopartizanskoye, a selo in Pavlovsky Stanitsa Okrug of Pavlovsky District of Krasnodar Krai
