= Tinguta =

Tinguta Тингута
- Station
- Location within Volgograd Oblast Location within Russia
- Coordinates: 48°17′N 44°16′E
- Country: Russia
- Region: Volgograd Oblast
- District: Svetloyarsky District
- Time zone: UTC+4:00

Tinguta (Russian: Тингута) is a rural locality (a station) in Svetloyarsky District, Volgograd Oblast, Russia. According to the 2010 census, the population was only 10 people.

== Geography ==
Tinguta is located 55 km southwest of Svetly Yar (the district's administrative centre) by road. Prudovy is the nearest rural locality.
