= Novosad, Volgograd Oblast =

Novosad Новосад
- Settlement
- Location within Volgograd Oblast Location within Russia
- Coordinates: 48°14′N 44°36′E
- Country: Russia
- Region: Volgograd Oblast
- District: Svetloyarsky District
- Time zone: UTC+4:00

Novosad (Russian: Новосад) is a rural locality (a settlement) in Svetloyarsky District, Volgograd Oblast, Russia. The population was 508 as of 2010.

== Geography ==
Novosad is located 43 km southwest of Svetly Yar (the district's administrative centre) by road. Privolzhsky is the nearest rural locality.
