= Krasnopartizansky =

Krasnopartizansky (masculine), Krasnopartizanskaya (feminine), or Krasnopartizanskoye (neuter) may refer to:

- Krasnopartizansky District, a district in Saratov Oblast, Russia
- Krasnopartizansky (rural locality) (Krasnopartizanskaya, Krasnopartizanskoye), name of several rural localities in Russia
