= Abganerovo, Svetloyarsky District, Volgograd Oblast =

Abganerovo Абганерово
- Settlement
- Location within Volgograd Oblast Location within Russia
- Coordinates: 48°08′N 44°06′E
- Country: Russia
- Region: Volgograd Oblast
- District: Svetloyarsky District
- Time zone: [[UTC+3:00]]

Abganerovo (Russian: Абганерово) is a rural locality (a village) in Privolnenskoye Rural Settlement of Svetloyarsky District, Volgograd Oblast, Russia. The population was 850 as of 2010. There are 12 streets.

== Geography ==
The village is located on the watershed of the basins of the Myshkova and Gniloy Aksay rivers, 84 km southwest of Svetly Yar (the district's administrative centre) by road. Privolny is the nearest rural locality.
