= Novosad (surname) =

Novosad is a surname. Notable people with the surname include:

- Anastasiya Novosad (born 1993), Ukrainian skier
- Austin Novosad (born 2004), American football player
- Hanna Novosad (born 1990), Ukrainian politician
- Lubomír Novosad, Slovak volleyball player
- Lukáš Novosad (born 1976), Czech canoeist
- Petr Novosad (born 1975), Czech footballer
