= Zhutovo 1-ye =

Zhutovo 1-ye Жутово 1-е
- Khutor
- Location within Volgograd Oblast Location within Russia
- Coordinates: 47°57′N 43°46′E
- Country: Russia
- Region: Volgograd Oblast
- District: Oktyabrsky District
- Time zone: UTC+4:00

Zhutovo 1-ye (Russian: Жутово 1-е) is a rural locality (a khutor) and the administrative center of Kovalyovskoye Rural Settlement, Oktyabrsky District, Volgograd Oblast, Russia. The population was 566 as of 2010. There are 7 streets.

== Geography ==
Zhutovo 1-ye is located in steppe, on Yergeni, on the right bank of the Aksay River, 17 km east of Oktyabrsky (the district's administrative centre) by road. Kovalevka is the nearest rural locality.
