= Gornaya Polyana =

Gornaya Polyana Горная Поляна
- Settlement
- Location within Volgograd Oblast Location within Russia
- Coordinates: 48°29′N 45°07′E
- Country: Russia
- Region: Volgograd Oblast
- District: Leninsky District
- Time zone: UTC+4:00

Gornaya Polyana (Russian: Горная Поляна) is a rural locality (a settlement) in Pokrovskoye Rural Settlement, Leninsky District, Volgograd Oblast, Russia. The population was 80 as of 2010. There are 4 streets.

== Geography ==
The village is located on Caspian Depression, 71 km from Volgograd, 29 km from Leninsk, 8.3 km from Pokrovka.
