= Nebykov =

Nebykov Небыков
- Khutor
- Location within Volgograd Oblast Location within Russia
- Coordinates: 47°47′N 43°31′E
- Country: Russia
- Region: Volgograd Oblast
- District: Kotelnikovsky District
- Time zone: UTC+4:00

Nebykov (Russian: Небыков) is a rural locality (a khutor) in Chilekovskoye Rural Settlement, Kotelnikovsky District, Volgograd Oblast, Russia. The population was 133 as of 2010. There are 2 streets.

== Geography ==
Nebykov is located 47 km northeast of Kotelnikovo (the district's administrative centre) by road. Chilekovo is the nearest rural locality.
