= Petr Novosad =

Czech footballer

Personal information
- Date of birth: 19 November 1975 (age 50)
- Place of birth: Czechoslovakia
- Height: 1.71 m (5 ft 7 in)
- Position: Midfielder

Youth career
- Vsetín

Senior career*
Years	Team	Apps	(Gls)
1996–2004	Zlín	166	(13)
2002	→ Sigma Olomouc (loan)	6	(0)
2005	Kujawiak Włocławek	5	(0)
2005–2007	Hlučín	9	(0)
2007	Vsetín		
- * Club domestic league appearances and goals

Petr Novosad (born 19 November 1975) is a Czech former professional footballer who played as a midfielder.
