= Svetly Yar, Svetloyarsky District, Volgograd Oblast =

Svetly Yar Светлый Яр
- Work settlement
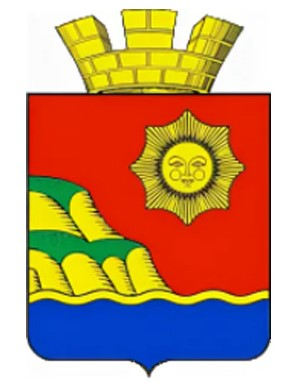
- Coat of arms
- Interactive map of Svetly Yar
- Location of Svetly Yar Svetly Yar (Volgograd Oblast)
- Coordinates: 48°29′N 44°47′E
- Country: Russia
- Federal subject: Volgograd Oblast
- Administrative district: Svetloyarsky District
- Founded: 1793
- Elevation: 18 m (59 ft)

Population (2010 Census)
  - Total: 12,537
  - Estimate (1 January 2024): 10,790 (−13.9%)

Administrative status
  - Subordinated to
  - Capital of: Svetloyarsky District
- Time zone: UTC+3 (MSK)
- Postal codes: 404170, 404171
- OKTMO ID: 18649151051

Svetly Yar (Russian: Све́тлый Яр) is an urban locality (a work settlement) and the administrative center of Svetloyarsky District in Volgograd Oblast, Russia, located on the Volga River. Population: 12,537 (2010 census); 13,102 (2002 census); 11,307 (1989 Soviet census).
