= Svetloyarsky District =

Svetloyarsky District Светлоярский район (Russian)
- District
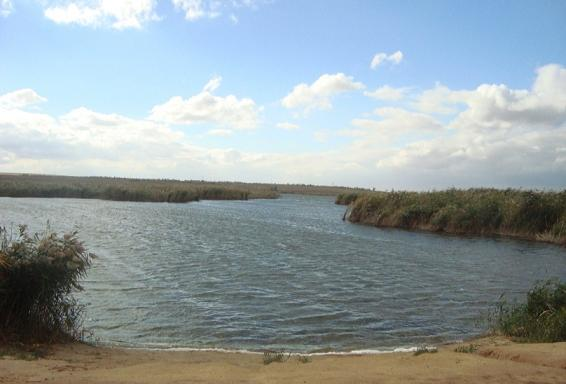
- Lake Sarpa in Svetloyarsky District

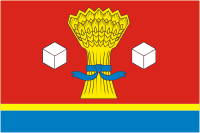
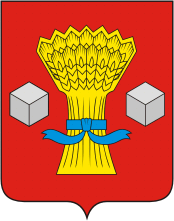
- Flag Coat of arms
- Location of Svetloyarsky District in Volgograd Oblast
- Coordinates: 48°28′N 44°47′E
- Country: Russia
- Federal subject: Volgograd Oblast
- Established: 23 June 1928
- Administrative center: Svetly Yar

Area
  - Total: 3,390 km^{2} (1,310 sq mi)

Population (2010 Census)
  - Total: 38,355
  - Density: 11.3/km^{2} (29.3/sq mi)
  - Urban: 32.7%
  - Rural: 67.3%

Administrative structure
  - Administrative divisions: 1 Urban-type settlements, 9 Selsoviets
  - Inhabited localities: 1 urban-type settlements, 28 rural localities

Municipal structure
  - Municipally incorporated as: Svetloyarsky Municipal District
  - Municipal divisions: 1 urban settlements, 9 rural settlements
- Time zone: UTC+3 (MSK)
- OKTMO ID: 18649000
- Website: http://www.svyar.ru/

Svetloyarsky District (Russian: Светлоя́рский райо́н) is an administrative district (raion), one of the thirty-three in Volgograd Oblast, Russia. As a municipal division, it is incorporated as Svetloyarsky Municipal District. The area of the district is 3,390 square kilometers (1,310 sq mi). Its administrative center is the urban locality (a work settlement) of Svetly Yar. Population: 38,355 (2010 census); 39,384 (2002 Census); 35,483 (1989 Soviet census). The population of Svetly Yar accounts for 32.7% of the district's total population.

== Geography ==
The district is located in the southeast of the oblast, in the area of the Volga Upland and the Yergeni hills.
